= 2025 in British radio =

This is a list of events taking place in 2025 relating to radio in the United Kingdom.

== Events ==
=== January ===
- 1 January
  - BBC Radio 2 counts down listeners' 40 top Elvis Presley songs in Your Ultimate Elvis Song, with "Suspicious Minds" voted as their favourite.
  - To celebrate the 100th anniversary of The Shipping Forecast, BBC Radio 4 recreates old versions of the broadcast read by a number of famous people, including Ruth Jones (in character as Nessa from Gavin and Stacey), Dame Ellen MacArthur and Eddie Grundy.
  - Jazz FM airs a day of programmes dedicated to bandleader Quincy Jones under the title Q Year's Day.
- 3 January – Technical problems disrupt Jo Good's Late Night Jo programme on BBC Local Radio, preventing the majority of the show from being networked. The show is broadcast for 20 minutes throughout the network before the problems lead to dead air being heard on the majority of stations. While BBC Radio London, albeit with some further minor interruptions, continues to take the show, the rest of the network switches to BBC Radio 5 Live.
- 4 January
  - Ian Shepherd joins Central Radio to present weekend breakfast.
  - Former Key 103 presenter Jonathan Miles joins Happy Radio UK to present a weekly show on Saturday evenings.
- 4–5 January – Adil Ray presents the second and third of his three festive programmes for Smooth Radio.
- 6 January
  - Aaron Paul begins presenting breakfast on BBC Radio London from Mondays to Thursdays; Riz Lateef continues with the show on Fridays.
  - Kirsty Gallacher joins the Gold network to present Gold Radio Drive on weekdays.
- 7 January – A power outage at Frisk Radio forces the breakfast show presenters Andy and Steph to present their content using a mobile phone.
- 9 January
  - Lauren Laverne announces she is stepping down as presenter of BBC Radio 6 Music's breakfast show; Nick Grimshaw will take over the show, while Laverne will move to presenting mid-mornings.
  - Global Radio announces that local and regional programming on Smooth Radio, Capital and Heart in England will end, with all three channels airing a nationwide schedule for England.
  - Bauer Media Audio UK announces it is acquiring Clear Channel Europe.
- 10 January – Bauer Media Audio UK reaches a deal to acquire Star Radio in Cambridgeshire and rebrand the station as Hits Radio.
- 11 January – Rod Liddle joins Times Radio to present Saturday mornings.
- 12 January – Mel Giedroyc joins Magic Radio to present a Sunday morning show.
- 13 January – Nemone temporarily takes over as presenter of BBC 6 Music Breakfast until Nick Grimshaw begins presenting the show in February.
- 17 January –
  - Happy Radio UK becomes the official radio partner of Manchester's AO Arena.
  - Appearing on Heart Breakfast, presenter Jamie Theakston announces that he is "cancer free" and will return to the programme from Monday 20 January.
- 18 January – Pianist and educator Nikki Yeoh joins Jazz FM to present a Saturday evening show from 10pm–12am, while regular presenter Chris Phillips moves to the earlier shot of 6pm–9pm, replacing Sarah Ward who retired from broadcasting at the end of 2024.
- 21 January – Ofcom finds Big City Radio CIC in breach of its Key Commitments over the music policy at BRMB, which it says does not represent the area's community sufficiently. In response, Big City Radio CIC says it has broadened BRMB's music output, but hopes to launch another service on DAB when it has the funds to do so.
- 25 January – Gaby Roslin joins Magic Radio to present a Saturday mid-morning show.
- 27 January –
  - The Scott Mills Breakfast Show debuts on BBC Radio 2, while Trevor Nelson begins presenting weekday mid-afternoons.
  - Gok Wan joins Magic Breakfast to co-present alongside Harriet Scott.
  - BBC Radio Wales confirms that Wynne Evans will be taking a break from his show following controversy over a remark he made during the Strictly Come Dancing tour earlier in the month.
- 29 January –
  - The BBC World Service announces it is cutting 130 jobs as part of £6m of cost-cutting measures during the next financial year.
  - Frisk Radio announces plans to expand its coverage from north east England to north west England from April.

=== February ===
- 3 February –
  - Kate McCann becomes weekday co-presenter of the breakfast show on Times Radio, alongside Stig Abell.
  - Joe McGrath takes over as BBC Radio Manchester's breakfast presenter, succeeding Anna Jameson.
  - Radio News Hub launches a worldwide hourly news service, delivering news to radio stations in their native languages.
  - Greatest Hits Radio Scotland's breakfast show, Ewen and Cat at Breakfast, is given a breach from Ofcom over a live interview with comedian Ford Kiernan on 10 September 2024 in which he used offensive words.
- 4 February – Talksport is announced as the official partner of the 2025 British & Irish Lions tour to Australia.
- 6 February – RAJAR listening figures for the final quarter of 2024 indicate a 23% increase in the number of listeners to Times Radio compared to the same period in 2023, with 604,000 average weekly listeners, while GB News Radio, the simulcast of the television channel, saw a 23% decline over the same period, with 468,000 weekly listeners. Talk Radio saw a 13% decline to 504,000.
- 7 February – Dan Draper, Alice Hopkins and Cloe Lee are confirmed as the next three presenters to present Radio 1's Friday Early Breakfast on a monthly basis, with Draper fronting the show in February, Hopkins in March and Lee in April.
- 8 February – Jermaine Jenas returns to radio as a football commentator for Talksport; it is his first radio appearance since he was sacked by the BBC over complaints about his workplace conduct.
- 10 February –
  - BBC Local Radio's The Late Show begins a week of live broadcasts from pubs around the UK named The Queen Victoria.
  - The national Hits Radio breakfast show airs on stations in the north east while the local breakfast presenters take a week's break.
- 11 February –
  - BBC Asian Network confirms some schedule changes as it prepares to move operations to Birmingham, with Bobby Friction moving from weekdays to weekends, and Amber Sandhu heaving the station.
  - Wise Buddah Productions produce a new jingles package for BBC Radio 2, including for The Scott Mills Breakfast Show featuring the House Gospel Choir.
- 12 February – Bauer Media announces it is selling its stake in media platform Octave to News UK, ending the two companies' year-long joint venture.
- 14 February – DH One rebrands as 100% Whatever Westcountry.
- 15 February –
  - Kay Wright is appointed Head of BBC Midlands, overseeing radio, television and online content in the East and West Midlands areas.
  - Anne Marie McAleese presents her final edition of BBC Radio Ulster's Your Place And Mine, which she has presented since 1991.
- 17 February –
  - Ofcom grants Talksport permission to switch off seven of its 18 mediumwave transmitters, reducing its AM coverage from 92% to 88% of the UK population.
  - Lyca Gold confirms that Sarita Sabharwal is to present a regular weekend show starting later in February.
  - BBC Radio Scotland presenter Janice Forsyth announces she is stepping down from presenting after being diagnosed with early onset Alzheimer's disease.
- 18 February –
  - BBC Radio 2 announces a new spring schedule, which includes a new Saturday afternoon show for Zoe Ball from May and moving Pick of the Pops from Saturday afternoons to early Sunday evenings, also in May. Rob Beckett will also leave his Sunday afternoon show in April, while Richie Anderson will present a new Sunday overnight show from April.
  - Erewash Sound has improved its signal output after securing a £5,500 grant for new transmitting equipment.
- 19 February – Absolute Radio Country hires Nashville radio presenter Kelly Sutton to present The Nashville Show, airing from Sunday to Thursday evenings.
- 21 February – Heart and Capital stations in England broadcast local and regional programming for the final time.
- 23 February – Musician Darius Rucker joins Absolute Radio Country to present the first of four two-hour programmes in which he shares his favourite music, as well as stories from his career.
- 24 February –
  - Heart, Capital and Smooth go entirely national throughout England after losing their final regional programmes. JK and Kelly Brook present a national Heart Drive on weekdays, while Will Manning presents a national Capital Drive and Jenni Falconer presents a national Smooth Breakfast. The current level of local opt-outs will be retained. Scotland and Wales will retain their non-networked programming.
  - Smooth Radio makes a few schedule changes, which includes Darren Parks presenting The Smooth Sanctuary on weekday evenings.
  - XS Manchester relaunches as Radio X 90s.
  - Rob Ellis joins Radio X 90s to present weekday mid mornings.
  - Capital and Capital Dance launch their spring schedules for 2025.
  - Stephanie Hirst joins Greatest Hits Radio 60s to present a weekday lunchtime show.
  - BBC Local Radio launches its 2025 Make a Difference Awards, with the awards covering the whole of the UK for the first time.
- 25 February –
  - A new BBC audio website and app will replace BBC Sounds for users outside the UK later in 2025, with listeners overseas only able to access the BBC World Service and BBC Radio 4 once the changes take place.
  - The BBC Board apologises for what it describes as "missed opportunities" to tackle "bullying and misogynistic behaviour" by former BBC Radio 1 DJ Tim Westwood.
  - BBC Radio 1 joins forces with radio stations from four other countries in Europe for Europe's Biggest Gig.
- 27 February – Charlotte Moore announces her departure as BBC Chief Content Officer; she will leave the post later in the year.
- 28 February – At 1pm, Global completes its withdrawal from broadcasting on AM when it switches off its last remaining MW transmitter, in North Wales and Cheshire which had carried Smooth Radio North Wales and Cheshire.

=== March ===
- 1 March –
  - Adil Ray joins Smooth Radio to present Saturday mid mornings following his guest appearance over the New Year. His show is followed by Tina Hobley, who adds Saturday afternoons to her Sunday afternoon slot.
  - Olly Murs co-presents a Saturday morning show for Heart alongside Mark Wright as part of the station's new spring schedule; the schedule changes also see Vicky Pattinson join Heart to present a Saturday afternoon show.
- 2 March – Dave Lee Travis joins Heritage Chart Radio to present a show on Sunday mornings.
- 3 March – Bauer Media Audio UK rebrands Star Radio in Cambridgeshire as Hits Radio.
- 5 March – Ellie Davis is appointed as Deputy Content Manager at Virgin Radio.
- 7 March – House Party Radio is added to DAB in north Birmingham.
- 8 March – Nation Radio South becomes available on DAB in Sussex.
- 10 March –
  - The BBC announces that Anna Foster will join Radio 4's Today programme from April.
  - Sky News signs a new deal with Independent Radio News to continue providing news and sport content to commercial radio in the UK.
- 14 March – BBC Radio 5 Live has agreed a deal to provide exclusive coverage of Formula 1 during 2025, 2026 and 2027.
- 17 March – Summaya Mughal takes over as breakfast presenter at BBC Radio Nottingham while regular presenter Verity Crowley is on maternity leave.
- 18 March – Tindle Group announces is intention to acquire South East Radio in Ireland.
- 19 March – The Rayo app's Skip Track feature, allowing premium subscribers to skip up to six tracks an hour on live radio, is to be discontinued, its owners have confirmed.
- 20 March – Bauer announces plans to network a single breakfast show across its Hits Radio network from 9 June, with further details to follow.
- 21 March –
  - BBC Radio 1 presenter Jamie Laing raises more than £2m for Comic Relief after completing his Comic Relief Ultra Marathon Man challenge of running five marathons in five days.
  - BBC Radio Wales DJ Aleighcia Scott reaches number one in the iTunes Reggae Chart with her first Welsh-language single, "Dod o'r Galon".
  - Pippa Taylor announces her departure as producer of Radio X's The Chris Moyles Show to take up the role of senior executive producer at Heart.
- 24 March – BBC Radio 4 expands its weekday broadcast hours and now begins broadcasting 20 minutes earlier, at 05:00 with a news bulletin replacing News Briefing. Yesterday In Parliament returns to Radio 4, airing at 05:04, and the Shipping Forecast moves to 05:34. Weekend programmes continue to start at 05:30.
- 25 March – Capital Breakfast presenter Chris Stark returns to the show following treatment for testicular cancer.
- 27 March – Nation Radio South expands its DAB coverage to cover Somerset.
- 28 March –
  - The BBC has "decided to rule out" placing adverts in some of its podcasts for UK listeners.
  - Ofcom revokes Saltito Media Limited's small-scale DAB licence award for the Isles of Scilly after it failed to set a launch date for the service.
  - Lisa Aziz and Martin Stanford announce their intention to leave their respective breakfast and mid-morning shows at LBC News, which they have presented since the station was launched in 2019.
- 31 March –
  - Absolute Radio, Kiss, Kisstory and Magic Radio transfer to the DAB+ format, allowing the stations to begin broadcasting via DAB in stereo.
  - Kiss Fresh is rebranded as Kiss Xtra.
  - Virgin Radio Anthems rebrands as Virgin Radio Legends.
  - Edge Radio Group officially opens its new headquarters in Edinburgh's Charlotte Square.

=== April ===
- 2 April – Ofcom finds Radio Winchcombe in breach of its rules following an incident in which the track "Homesick" by Noah Kahan and Sam Fender, which includes an instance of the F word, was played at 5pm during a weekend show.
- 3 April – BBC Local Radio and BBC Sport extend their partnership with the England and Wales Cricket Board for another four years.
- 7 April – LBC News announces a new weekday schedule, which sees Vanessa Baffoe join to present weekday breakfast, James Hanson presenting weekday evenings and Charlotte Lynch presenting weekday late nights.
- 8 April – Times Radio notches up its one billionth view on its YouTube channel.
- 10 April – Ofcom provisionally rejects the BBC's plans to launch a Radio 2 spin-off station due to the potential impact on commercial stations such as Boom Radio. Plans to expand the hours of Radio 5 Sports Extra are also rejected on the grounds the BBC had not sufficiently proved the station would appeal to its target audience. Three other stations – BBC Radio 1 Dance, BBC Radio 1 Anthems and BBC Radio 3 Unwind – are given the go-ahead. Phil Riley, co-founder of Boom Radio, welcomes Ofcom's decision to reject the Radio 2 spin-off.
- 17 April – The BBC announces a delay to its plans to geoblock the BBC Sounds app outside the UK.
- 18 April – Laura McGhie joins BBC Radio 5 Live to present overnights on Fridays, Saturdays and Sundays from Glasgow, sharing the overnight slot with Dotun Adebayo, who will continue to broadcast from London on the other days of the week.
- 21 April – Natalie Cassidy presents a one-off show for Virgin Radio UK.
- 22 April –
  - Ed James joins BBC Radio WM to present weekday mid-mornings.
  - Robyn Richford joins Capital Scotland Breakfast to co-present alongside Fat Brestovci.
- 24 April – Planet Rock have hired Steve Priestly to present Chilled Rock on Sunday evenings.
- 25 April – Zoe Ball presents Elaine Paige: 60 Years in Showbusiness, a world exclusive concert honouring the career of Elaine Paige on Radio 2.
- 28 April –
  - Ellie Taylor makes her Radio 2 debut by presenting the first of two drivetime shows standing in for Sara Cox.
  - BBC Asian Network is scheduled to complete its move to Birmingham.
  - Will Best joins Hits Breakfast as a co-presenter alongside Fleur East and James Barr.
- 30 April – Global have hired Christine Amanpour, the Chief International Anchor at CNN, for a new multi-podcast partnership.

=== May ===
- 2 May – Minah Shannon, a contestant on series three of The Traitors, joins BBC Radio 1's Friday Early Breakfast to co-present alongside Nat O'Leary during May.
- 5 May –
  - Angel Radio expands its coverage by joining DAB in Surrey and South London.
  - Jonny Gould joins Fix Radio as their sports editor, and will provide hourly sports bulletins during weekdays.
  - Smooth Radio listeners vote "Careless Whisper" by George Michael number one in the Smooth Radio All Time Top 500 for the seventh year in a row.
- 6 May – Broadcaster James Whale reveals that he has made the decision to stop receiving treatment for stage four kidney cancer.
- 7 May – Talksport have hired Eddie Jones, the former head coach of the England and Australian rugby teams, to join its team providing coverage of the 2025 British and Irish Lions tour.
- 14 May – RAJAR figures for the first quarter of 2025 are published, and indicate Heart to be the UK's most listened to radio network, with 13.4 million listeners, compared to 13.1 million for BBC Radio 2.
- 16 May – Two new services, BBC Radio 5 Sports Extra 2 and BBC Radio 5 Sports Extra 3, appear on BBC Sounds as streaming services to supplement BBC Radio 5 Sports Extra.
- 19 May – Ofcom rules that a programme on Times Radio presented by Alexis Conran on 29 June 2024, during the 2024 election campaign, that featured a candidate listing local investments in his constituency breached the broadcasting rules because it amounted to a constituency report.
- 20 May – Radiocentre urges Ofcom to require the BBC's planned new DAB+ stations to have hourly news bulletins.
- 21 May – STV announce plans to launch a Scottish radio station aimed at people aged 35–54.
- 23–25 May – BBC Radio 1's Big Weekend takes place at Sefton Park, Liverpool.
- 24 May – Mercia Sound returns to the airwaves for one night to celebrate the 45th anniversary of its launch, with Radio Plus, which operates from Mercia's former studios in Hertford Place, Coventry, hosting a takeover event that includes an evening of programmes, and former Mercia presenters.
- 27 May – Victoria Easton Riley is appointed as Head of Audio and Events at BBC Scotland.
- 28 May – Community station Somer Valley FM receives The King's Award for Voluntary Service in recognition of its contribution to community broadcasting.
- 29 May – Ofcom launches a consultation process on a request from the BBC to reduce its news and current affairs commitments on BBC Radio Foyle and the BBC Asian Network.
- 30 May – Radio presenter Wynne Evans announces he is leaving BBC Radio Wales after the BBC did not renew his contract.

=== June ===
- 1 June –
  - Due to what is described as "human error", BBC Radio 2 repeats the 25 May edition of Elaine Paige on Sunday rather than playing the latest edition. The edition is subsequently made available on BBC Sounds.
  - Boom Radio pays tribute to presenter John Peters, who died on 24 May, with an unaired edition of his show, The Vintage Chart, recorded shortly before his death.
  - Virgin Radio Pride UK returns for a fifth year, and will be on air until 31 August.
- 2 June –
  - Sophie Habboo stands in for Vick Hope on BBC Radio 1's Going Home while Hope is on maternity leave. She will co-present the show alongside Jamie Laing until 18 June.
  - Punjab Radio expands its DAB coverage to Derby, Royal Leamington Spa, Nottingham, Wolverhampton, Shropshire, Telford and Coventry.
  - Boom Light launches on DAB+ in several major UK cities, with Pete Murray announcing the switch-on at 10am. Fran Godfrey and Don Black also join the station.
- 4 June – BBC Radio 5 Live is briefly taken off air following a fire alarm at Westminster during the middle of a broadcast.
- 5 June –
  - Times Radio announces that Jo Coburn and Stephen Sackur will join to present The Times at One alongside Andrew Neil, Trevor Phillips and Daniel Finkelstein.
  - BBC Radio Scotland presenter Bryan Burnett announces he will be taking a break from his programme to undergo cancer treatment.
- 6 June – Eleven Hits Radio local breakfast shows across England and Wales air for the final time as Bauer prepares to transmit a single breakfast show for the entire network.
- 9 June –
  - Bauer begins networking a single breakfast show across its Hits Radio network in England and Wales.
  - Hits Radio North East breakfast presenters Steve and Karen begin a nationwide breakfast show on Hits Radio 90s.
  - Magic Classical has a weekday schedule revamp, with Tim Smith joining to present mid mornings, and Fran Godfrey presenting evening from Sunday to Thursday.
  - South Wales radio personalities Leigh Jones and Claire Scott join 102.1 Swansea Bay Radio to present the breakfast show.
- 13 June – Among those from the world of broadcasting to be recognised in the 2025 Birthday Honours are Elaine Paige who receives a damehood, Martha Kearney who receives a CBE and Claudia Winkleman who receives an MBE.
- 14 June – Broadcaster Shereen Nanjiani presents her final Saturday morning show for BBC Radio Scotland after 17 years.
- 16 June –
  - Former BBC Radio Wales presenter Wynne Evans launches his own daily online radio show, and says the first programme had 40,000 listeners.
  - Alex Duffy joins Nation Radio to present breakfast in Yorkshire and North Lincolnshire. Alex had been the breakfast show host on Hits Radio East Yorkshire & North Lincolnshire until Bauer ended the local breakfast shows on 6 June.
- 24 June –
  - Prince William makes a surprise appearance on Scott Mills's breakfast show via voicemail, inviting Mills to attend the Earthshot Prize in Brazil in November.
  - Greatest Hits Radio changes its name to GHR in the Republic of Ireland after an Irish High Court injunction prevents them from using their full name following a case brought by Dublin's Classic Hits Radio.
- 26 June –
  - Greatest Hits Radio announces that it will have a single breakfast show across the mainland UK from late July, presented by Simon Ross. The announcement comes after Ween Cameron and Cat Harvey, GHR's breakfast presenters in Scotland, confirm they will be leaving the network.
  - Kiss begins a year-long sponsorship deal with Mars Wrigley.
- 30 June –
  - The Radio Teleswitch Service, which uses a radio signal to communicate with some older electricity meters, enabling them to switch between peak and off-peak settings, and is transmitted by the BBC on 198 kHz long wave alongside BBC Radio 4, begins being turned off.
  - BBC Radio Derby has appointed Becky Measures as its new breakfast show presenter, replacing Andy Twigge, who moves to a regionally networked mid-morning show.

=== July ===
- 1 July –
  - Both BBC Radio 2 and Greatest Hits Radio are forced to reschedule their mid-morning programming after Vernon Kay and Ken Bruce are delayed by train disruption following signal failures on the West Coast Main Line.
  - Smooth jazz and soul station Diamond Groove joins DAB in North Yorkshire and Somerset.
- 2 July – Ofcom's final decision on extra BBC DAB services is released, with BBC Radio 1 Dance, BBC Radio 1 Anthems and BBC Radio 3 Unwind given the go-ahead, but proposals for a Radio 2 spin-off and extending the hours of BBC Radio 5 Sports Extra both rejected.
- 4 July –
  - Capital Dance Party Malta is scheduled to take place at the island's Tortuga Beach.
  - Ofcom gives Nation Radio Wales permission to switch off two of its FM signals in Ceredigion.
- 7 July –
  - Neil Fox joins Nation 90s to present weekday drivetime. Nation also announces that Tony Dibdin and Emma Saint will co-present weekday breakfast on Nation Radio London.
  - The Radio Today website reports that the pop-up station Virgin Radio Britpop is playing Oasis songs for 90 minutes each evening during the band's Oasis Live '25 Tour when they are playing a gig. The tour finishes on 12 August.
- 13 July –
  - Paul Gambaccini presents Live Aid – The Fans Story on BBC Radio 2 to coincide with the 40th anniversary of the Live Aid concert.
  - Greatest Hits Radio airs the entire ten hour Live Aid concert in real time, beginning at 12 noon as the concert did in 1985.
- 14 July – Ofcom fines the former operator of Salaam BCR £3,500 after ruling that two broadcasts on the station in October 2024 included antisemitic hate speech.
- 16 July – Former Radio Caroline presenter Steve Kent joins South Devon Radio to present weekday mid-mornings.
- 18 July – Talk broadcasts a conversation recorded by James Whale with Nigel Farage which was recorded at Whale's home the previous weekend. It airs at 10am on YouTube and 10pm on Talk.
- 21 July –
  - BBC Sounds will no longer be available to listeners based outside the UK, although it will still be available to UK citizens travelling overseas, who can access it for one month. International listeners will also continue to be able to hear BBC national and local radio stations through direct links to the stations' websites.
  - Global have acquired their first non-UK radio station after buying Monaco-based English language station Riviera Radio.
  - Ruairidh Mac, Lomond Radio's youngest presenter, marks his 200th show with a special edition of the station's Kids Edition.
- 21–24 July – BBC Radio, television and online provides coverage of the 2025 Royal Welsh Show, with radio coverage provided by BBC Radio 4 and BBC Radio Wales.
- 22 July – CMAT's new single, "Euro-Country", receives its debut airplay on BBC Radio 1. The station faces allegations the song was edited after the first 45 seconds, featuring Irish language lyrics, are not broadcast. Radio 1 later says it did not edit the song.
- 29 July – Ofcom approves River Radio's request to take on the 107.9FM licence used by the former community station Bangor FM, enabling River Radio Bangor to launch a replacement service.
- 30 July – Publication of Ofcom's latest Media Nations report. It reports a fall in commercial radio revenue to £651 million in 2024, down from £667 million in 2023, and an 8% growth in podcast advertising to £90 million in 2024.
- 31 July –
  - RAJAR publishes its data for radio listening during the second quarter of 2025, indicating that commercial radio has reached its highest percentage of regular listeners. The figures show 55.7% of listeners (roughly 39.5 million) tuning in to commercial radio, compared to 42.1% (31.1 million) regularly tuning in to the BBC.
  - Ofcom approves the BBC's request to reduce its news and current affairs quotas for BBC Radio Foyle and BBC Asian Network.
  - Nation Broadcasting will surrenders its FM licence for Ceredigion following Ofcom requiring Nation to reintroduce local programming. Nation had been using the three frequencies in the licensing area to relay Nation Radio Wales. Nation Radio continues to be available in the area via DAB.

=== August ===
- 1 August – Time 107.5 is acquired by Nation Broadcasting and, at 2pm, is rebranded as Nation Radio London.
- 4 August –
  - Launch of Welsh Coast Radio, the successor to SA Radio Live and Radio Tircoed.
  - LNER announces that its Routes podcast will return for a second series in September, with Jenni Falconer taking over as presenter.
- 6 August – BBC Radio Wales announces that Bronwen Lewis will succeed Wynne Evans as weekday midmorning presenter, with her new show beginning in September.
- 7 August –
  - Return of Radio 1's Residency in the Thursday 11pm–1am slot. Featured DJs will be SG Lewis in August, KETTAMA in September, Oppidan in October, and Taylah Elaine in November.
  - BBC Local Radio dedicates a day of programming to farming, with BBC Farmwatch.
- 7–8 August – Ken Bruce presents his Greatest Hits Radio show from the Edinburgh Festival Fringe.
- 11 August – Heart Scotland relaunches its weekday breakfast show with Des Clarke, Adele Cunningham and Grado.
- 13 August – The BBC apologises after Dr Krish Kandiah, a contributor to the Radio 4 Today programme's Thought for the Day slot accused Robert Jenrick, the Shadow Secretary of State for Justice, of "xenophobia".
- 14 August – Bryan Burnett is scheduled to return to his BBC Radio Scotland evening show following treatment for cancer.
- 18 August –
  - Jason Horton takes on the role of interim Chief Operating Officer, Nations at the BBC, stepping into the role while Sarah Calcott undertakes a twelve-month external attachment.
  - Ofcom finds Absolute Radio in breach of the Broadcasting Code over a breakfast show competition in March that it says was conducted unfairly.
  - Ofcom finds Boom Rock in breach of the Broadcasting Code after it played "Spaceman in Tulsa", a track by Counting Crows that contains several expletives, at 6.35pm on 30 May, when Ofcom felt children could be listening. Boom Radio counters that children would be unlikely to be in the station's audience.
- 22 August – Absolute Radio listeners vote Pulp's 1995 hit "Common People" the Ultimate Britpop Anthem.
- 25 August – Classic FM listeners vote Howard Shore’s film score to The Lord of the Rings trilogy number one in the Classic FM Movie Music Hall of Fame 2025.
- 26 August –
  - Lucy Horobin joins Magic Radio to present weekday drivetime alongside Tom Price while Kat Shoob takes maternity leave.
  - Your Harrogate co-founder Nick Hancock, who presents the station's breakfast show, announces his departure after five years.
- 27 August –
  - BBC Radio 1 announces its autumn presenter line-up for Friday Early Breakfast and Radio 1's Life Hacks. For Friday Early Breakfast they will be Beth Wallace (September), Jack Remmington (October) and Ash Holme (October). Radio 1's Life Hacks will have different co-presenters while Shanequa Paris is on maternity leave. Charley Marlowe will co-present with Lauren Layfield in September and Lina Nielsen in October. Both will also co-present The Official Chart: First Look on Sundays at 6pm.
  - Nick Hancock joins YO1 Radio as Programme Director and weekday breakfast show presenter.

=== September ===
- 1 September –
  - Jaz Singh begins presenting a weekday afternoon show on BBC Asian Network.
  - Radio Chelmsford, Radio Southend and Radio Harlow are relaunched as a single station titled Essex Breeze.
  - Rachael Burke-Davies and Wingman (Nigel Clucas) join Happy Radio to present weekday drivetime.
  - Launch of Magic Christmas, 115 days before 25 December.
- 3 September – Melvyn Bragg stands down as presenter of Radio 4's In Our Time after 26 years with the discussion programme.
- 4 September –
  - Talksport secures a new three-year deal with WSL Football to hold exclusive radio rights until 2028.
  - British broadcaster Malissa Whitehouse wins the 2025 International Singer-Songwriters Association Award for Outstanding Achievement in Radio Broadcasting.
- 5 September –
  - BBC Radio Bristol is temporarily taken off air following a power outage.
  - The 2025 Bauer Media Awards are held at the Roundhouse in Camden, coinciding with a celebration for Bauer Media Group's 150th anniversary.
- 5–7 September – Radio 2 in the Park takes place at Hylands Park in Chelmsford, with Bryan Adams and Def Leppard headlining.
- 10 September –
  - Ofcom opens the final round of applications for small-scale DAB licences.
  - STV announces that its new radio station will be called STV Radio, but a launch date is yet to be confirmed.
- 11 September –
  - Launch of BBC Radio 1 Dance, BBC Radio 1 Anthems and BBC Radio 3 Unwind on DAB+.
  - Ofcom rules that Wiltshire based Castledown FM breached election broadcasting rules by allowing a candidate to present shows in April 2025 while a candidate in the 2025 Wiltshire Council election.
- 14 September –
  - Greatest Hits Radio's Superstars series returns, beginning with a special programme featuring the music of David Bowie.
  - Launch of Make a Difference, a networked BBC Local Radio programme highlighting positive stories in local communities, which replaces a number of locally broadcast Sunday afternoon music programmes. Stations will opt out of the programme to broadcast local sport commentaries.
- 16 September – Conservative Party leader Kemi Badenoch begins presenting a monthly phone-in on LBC.
- 19 September – Pete Murray celebrates his 100th birthday by presenting an edition of the Boom Top Five at 11am on Boom Radio.
- 20 September – Actor Colson Smith joins BBC Local Radio in Yorkshire to present a weekly Saturday show on BBC Radio Sheffield, BBC Radio York and BBC Radio Leeds.
- 26 September – BBC Radio 1 takes part in Europe's Biggest Dance Show 2025.
- 29 September –
  - Small-scale DAB licences are awarded for Banbury and Bicester, Enniskillen, Rugby and Daventry, Stockton-on-Tees, the Western Isles, Weston-super-Mare, and Worcester.
  - Heart Christmas and Smooth Christmas return to DAB.

=== October ===
- 1 October –
  - Lincs Sound, which launched online on 30 June, becomes available on DAB to mark Lincolnshire Day.
  - Christmas Radio returns to DAB in Portsmouth, as well as online.
- 3 October –
  - Taylor Swift appears on a number of UK radio stations to promote the launch of her latest album, The Life of a Showgirl.
  - BBC Radio Ulster wins four gold awards at the 2025 Irish Music Rights Organisation Awards.
- 6 October –
  - Ofcom finds Birmingham's BRMB in breach of its broadcasting licence for not airing enough content that reflects the ethnic communities in the Aston area. BRMB says its output reflects the diversity of the community it serves.
  - Ofcom finds Belfast station Juice FM in breach of the Key Commitments part of its licence for failing to produce the require amount of LGBT-themed programming.
- 7 October –
  - Ofcom finds West Somerset Radio in breach of its licence after being off air since May 2024.
  - Following a trial at Birmingham Crown Court, Peter Windsor, who sent the television and radio presenter Myleene Klass items including handcuffs, a gun and a police uniform, is convicted of stalking her, along with Classic FM presenter Katie Breathwick.
- 9 October – Former Radio 1 DJ Tim Westwood is charged with four counts of rape, nine counts of indecent assault, and two counts of sexual assault, relating to alleged offences against seven women between 1983 and 2016. He is due to appear at Westminster Magistrates’ Court on 11 November.
- 10 October – Global Radio's 2025 Make Some Noise Campaign raises £4.8m for charity.
- 14 October –
  - The Audio Always comedy podcast Help I Sexted My Boss joins Global Player and will appear there a day ahead of other outlets.
  - BBC Radio 3 show Round Midnight is named Jazz Media Award winner at the 2025 Parliamentary Jazz Awards.
- 15 October –
  - The BBC asks Ofcom to remove the requirement to report how many hours of live commentary are provided for each sport on BBC Radio 5 Live.
  - The BBC also asks Ofcom to change its quota for locally produced programming for BBC Local Radio.
- 16 October – Ofcom launches a consultation proposing new rules to guarantee access to UK radio via voice assistant platforms such as Alexa, Siri and Google Assistant.
- 17 October – Voiceover artist and performer Elisa Canas joins BBC Radio to present a Saturday Breakfast show on BBC Radio Jersey and BBC Radio Guernsey.
- 19 October – BBC Radio Scotland presenter Kaye Adams is taken off air following an internal complaint about her behaviour. Her morning programme will be presented by Connie McLaughlin when it returns on Monday 20 October.
- 20 October – Ofcom introduces new guidance for broadcasters on how politicians can appear as presenters in programmes that include news content.
- 21 October –
  - Heart 80s breakfast presenter Simon Beale reveals that he is recovering at home following a heart attack three weeks earlier.
  - The Radio Today website reports that QVC has become the official sponsor of Mellow Magic in order to support midlife wellbeing.
- 22 October – Global Media & Entertainment launches dedicated video podcast and sports entertainment divisions.
- 29 October – Global Media & Entertainment is named Team GB's Official Audio and Outdoor Partner ahead of the 2026 Winter Olympics.
- 31 October –
  - STV Radio announces that Jane McCarry, Micky Gavin and Jodie McCluskey will join its presenting team for its launch in 2026.
  - Greatest Hits Radio listeners have voted Bohemian Rhapsody by Queen the greatest hit of the 1970s, 1980s and 1990s for the seventh consecutive year.

=== November ===
- 4 November – Global founder Ashley Tabor-King is presented with the 2025 Music Industry Trusts Award in recognition of his impact on British broadcasting and music.
- 5 November – Chloe Straw confirms she will stand down as chief executive officer of AudioUK at the end of the year.
- 5 and 8 November – Pet Classics returns to Classic FM to coincide with Bonfire Night, playing classical music to help calm pets and their owners. The 5 November edition is presented by Dan Walker and the 8 November edition by Charlotte Hawkins.
- 7 November – BCfm and Ujima Radio launch the Civil Unrest Broadcast and Response Protocol for Local and Community Radio, a new national guide to help community stations respond safely and responsibly during times of civil unrest.
- 8 November – Josie Gibson returns to Magic Radio to present a festive Saturday evening show in the run up to Christmas.
- 11 November – Small-scale DAB licences are awarded for Lancaster, North Somerset, Oban, Taunton, and West Oxfordshire.
- 12 November –
  - Talk Radio confirms that Mike Graham will not return to the station following an internal investigation into what it described as a "vile and abhorrent" Facebook post.
  - The Radio Today website reports that north Wales's Drift Radio has launched on DAB+ to celebrate its fifth anniversary.
- 13 November – It is announced that Ezra Collective drummer and bandleader Femi Koleoso will join BBC Radio 6 Music as a regular presenter from 2 January 2026.
- 14 November –
  - BBC Radio 2 presenter Sara Cox completes her five-day, 135-mile Great Northern Marathon Challenge, raising more than £7.6m for Children in Need.
  - Commercial station Derby ONE launches online at 8am, with plans to become available on DAB.
- 17 November – Harrogate Hospital Radio is awarded £18,000 by the National Lottery Community Fund to help improve its broadcasting facilities.
- 18 November – BBC Radio 1's Big Weekend 2026 will be held in Sunderland from 22 to 24 May, it is announced.
- 19 November – Dorset community station Air107.2 announces it will close at the end of November due to funding issues.
- 21 November – Jo Lloyd, formerly of Smooth Radio and Century Radio, joins Dune Radio to present a new Saturday programme.
- 24 November –
  - BBC Radio 4 announces its festive guest presenters for the Today programme, with the list including former prime minister Theresa May and actress Cate Blanchett.
  - Launch of Radio Scotland Breakfast, replacing Good Morning Scotland on BBC Radio Scotland. The programme is presented by Martin Geissler and Laura Maciver.
- 25 November – Lyca Radio expands its DAB coverage to parts of the Midlands, with the station now available in Coventry, Derbyshire, Wolverhampton and Shropshire.
- 26 November – Madness play an exclusive Radio 2 in Concert gig at the BBC Radio Theatre in London for broadcast on Radio 2 on 11 December.
- 27 November –
  - Air107.2, scheduled to close on 30 November, is saved from going off air with the return of founder Carl Greenham as its managing director.
  - BBC Radio 2 announces the launch of a new programme, Tony Blackburn's Sounds of Soul, which will air on Saturday lunchtimes from January 2026.
- 28 November – Richard Maddock is appointed as Head of BBC Radio 5 Live.
- 29 November – BBC Radio Scotland sports broadcaster Kenny Macintyre announces that he has been diagnosed with prostate cancer during an edition of the station's Off the Ball programme.

=== December ===
- 1 December – Radio Scotland Breakfast is taken off-air for two hours following a fire at BBC Scotland's headquarters. Music, then a simulcast of BBC Radio 5 Live, airs from 6.30am to 8.35am.
- 2 December – Virgin Radio releases its Christmas schedule, with programmes including a three-hour show presented by Alan Carr on 20 December, and Tony Mortimer presenting on Christmas Day. Evening shows on Christmas Eve, Christmas Day and Boxing Day will be presented by John Power, Richard Ashcroft and Pete Doherty respectively.
- 3 December – BBC Radio 4 announces that Misha Glenny will succeed Melvyn Bragg as presenter of In Our Time when the series returns in January 2026.
- 4 December – Fix Radio announces that Daryl Robinson will join the station to present a Saturday morning programme from 17 January 2026.
- 5 December –
  - Radio News Hub appoints Lisa Darvill as its Newsroom Manager.
  - BBC Radio 1 presenter Greg James presents the Radio 1 Breakfast show from the Scilly Isles as part of Greg's Rogue Promises.
- 6 December – Alan Brazil joins Virgin Radio to present a four-hour Saturday evening show in which tells stories from his careers in broadcasting and sport, and plays some of his favourite music.
- 6 and 7 December – Capital's Jingle Bell Ball is held at The O2 Arena in London, with headlining acts including Ed Sheeran on 6 December and Kylie Minogue on 7 December.
- 8 December – STV Radio announces that its breakfast show will be sponsored by CR Smith when it launches in early 2026.
- 9 December –
  - KISS announces that Tyler West and Chloe Burrows will take over the KISS Breakfast Show in early 2026.
  - Plans are announced for the launch of Magna Radio and Magna Mix, two local stations for Lincolnshire, on DAB in 2026.
- 10 December –
  - Ofcom awards four more small-scale DAB multiplex licences for Ely and March, Market Harborough, Wakefield and Castleford, and Wellingborough.
  - Happy Radio UK is confirmed as the official radio partner for the new Greater Manchester Wellbeing Series.
- 11 December –
  - Global unveils the winners of its inaugural Global Player Awards, recognising the artists and podcasters most listened to across its radio network and on Global Player.
  - Affinity Radio North East officially opens new broadcast studios in Pelaw.
- 13 December – Zoe Ball announces she is leaving her Saturday afternoon show on BBC Radio 2 and will present her final edition on 20 December. The show will then be presented by Emma Willis.
- 15 December –
  - BBC Radio Cymru confirms that author Manon Steffan Ros will present its weekly arts programme on Sunday afternoons from the end of January.
  - Milton Keynes-based Horizon Radio is resolved of a breach of broadcasting by Ofcom over a 26-minute interruption of its pre-recorded evening show on 9 October during which the F-word was played on repeat. The incident is found to have been out of their control as it involved a third-party streaming service with which Horizon was involved in a dispute. Horizon made multiple attempts to contact the service during the incident, and have since moved their streaming services in house.
- 16 December – PRS for Music has paid out a record £274.9m in royalties during 2025, including £13.5m generated from radio play, shared between 51,500 members.
- 17 December – Comedian Josh James joins Fix Radio as drivetime presenter, and will begin presenting the show from 12 January 2026. Present hosts Rich and Trev will move to Saturdays as part of changes to the weekend schedule.
- 18 December – STV Radio confirms it will launch on Wednesday 7 January 2026, with Ewen Cameron and Cat Harvey presenting the weekday breakfast show.
- 22 December –
  - BBC Radio Manchester stages a carol concert at the Trafford Centre with a choir made up entirely of women named Carol and Carole.
  - Nation Radio Yorkshire announces it will begin daytime local programming from Monday 5 January 2026.
- 23 December – BBC1Xtra presenter Nick Bright announces he is leaving the station after 15 years.
- 24 December – BBC Sounds has recorded more than 2.5 billion plays of radio, music and podcasts during 2025.
- 25 December –
  - Greg James presents his first live Christmas Day edition of The Radio 1 Breakfast Show.
  - Radio Caroline broadcasts live from MV Ross Revenge for the first time since the ship last operated offshore.
  - Fred Dinenage broadcasts a special Christmas Day programme on Nation Radio South.
  - Radio Exe gives over some of its schedule to students from the University of Exeter.
- 30 December – 2026 New Year Honours: Among those in the world of broadcasting to be recognised in the New Year Honours are John Pickford, who receives an MBE for his services to radio and local news, Charlotte Moore and Gabby Logan, who both receive OBEs for their services to radio and television.
- 31 December – Former Prime Minister Theresa May guest edits an edition of Radio 4's Today programme, which includes an appearance by Queen Camilla for a discussion about violence against women.

== Station debuts ==
=== Terrestrial ===
- 20 February – Virgin Radio Britpop, a pop-up station playing hits from the Britpop era and available on DAB in London.
- 31 March –
  - Greatest Hits Radio 70s
  - Greatest Hits Radio 80s
  - Hits Radio 90s
  - Hits Radio 00s
- 18 April – Dorset Coast Radio
- 15 May – Radio X Oasis, a pop-up station to celebrate the Oasis Live '25 Tour.
- 4 July – Edge 3, a country station available in Edinburgh.
- 1 September – Essex Breeze, an amalgamation of three stations, Radio Chelmsford, Radio Southend and Radio Harlow.
- 11 September – BBC Radio 1 Dance, BBC Radio 1 Anthems and BBC Radio 3 Unwind.
- September – Pure Dance, relaunched after closing in 2006.
- 1 October – Lomond Christmas
- 30 October – Channel Christmas (on air until 27 December).
- 1 November –
  - Lomond Country
  - Virgin Radio Christmas (on air from 1 November until 27 December)
  - Your Christmas.
- 5 November –
  - Sunrise Hits
  - Sunrise Retro

=== Online ===
- 13 February – Bridget Jones Radio, a pop-up station launched by Bauer to coincide with the release of the film Bridget Jones: Mad About the Boy, on Rayo.
- 17 February – PRIDE FM, an online station supporting the UK's LGBTQ+ community.
- March – CRFM West
- 19 May – Laser Hot Hits
- 30 June – Lincs Sound
- 11 August – Zen Essentials 1, an audio streaming service playing meditation music by day and pure white noise overnight, on Amazon Alexa.
- 7 September – Barnsley Essentials.
- 31 October – Soundtrack Radio, a station dedicated to soundtracks from Atlantic Screen Group.
- 1 November – Calming Pet Sounds, a week-long pop-up station from Magic Classical aimed at calming pets during the week of Bonfire Night.
- 15 November – Derby ONE.
- 3 December – Pulse Mix Radio.
- 26 December – Corby Retro Rewind.

== Small-scale multiplex switch-ons ==
- 25 February – South Hertfordshire
- 28 March – Poole, Purbeck and Wimborne

== Closing this year ==
Date	Channel	Launched
14 January	Halton Community Radio	2008
4 March	Tone FM	2013
1 August	Time 107.5	1998
30 November	Coast Radio	2024

== Programme debuts ==
- 10 January – Together with Gareth Malone, an eight-part series introducing new listeners to classical music, on Classic FM.
- 11 January – Next Level with DanTDM, a weekly series presented by YouTuber DanTDM looking at video game soundtracks on Classic FM.
- 27 January – The Scott Mills Breakfast Show on BBC Radio 2.
- 2 March – Sunday Roast, weekly show presented by Olivia Attwood and Pete Wicks, on KISS.
- 10 March – The King's Music Room on Apple Music.
- 14 March – Trust Me, It's a Classic, a five-part series presented by Alexander Dragonetti, on Classic FM.
- 18 March – Home Front with Russell Quirk, a 12-part series on the subject of property, from Radio News Hub. (programme details announced on this date)
- 25 March – What's Up Docs?, a new health and wellbeing programme and podcast presented by Chris and Xand van Tulleken, on BBC Radio 4 and BBC Sounds.
- 6 April – NLive Radio Politics Show on NLive Radio.
- 18 April – The Royal Albert Hall of Fame with Anna Lapwood, a series celebrating the Royal Albert Hall, on Classic FM.
- 22 May – The Matt Forde Focus Group, a political comedy presented by Matt Forde, on BBC Radio 4.
- 29 June – The Wandsworth Way, a 40-part soap opera, on Riverside Radio.
- 18 August – The Mash Up with Eryn Cooper, a show presented by broadcaster Eryn Cooper, on CountryLine Radio.
- 25 August – Steve Wright – A Celebration on BBC Radio 2.
- 14 September – Make a Difference, a Sunday afternoon programme highlighting positive stories from local communities, on BBC Local Radio
- 21 September – 70 Years of ITV, a programme celebrating ITV's 70th anniversary with Jenny Hanley and Trevor McDonald, on Boom Radio.
- 29 October – Asian Network Trending, a programme covering the most talked about topics in the British Asian community, on BBC Asian Network.
- 1 November – Sounds of Cinema with Edith Bowman on BBC Radio 3.
- 24 November – Radio Scotland Breakfast with Martin Geissler and Laura Maciver on BBC Radio Scotland.

== Podcast debuts ==
- 13 January – James O'Brien Daily, featuring highlights from his LBC phone-in, on Global Player.
- 23 January – Winning Isn't Everything, a comedy podcast hosted by Strictly Come Dancing champions Chris McCausland and Dianne Buswell.
- 18 February – Oops, I Peed My Pants – Breaking the Silence on Female Incontinence & Pelvic Health.
- 13 March – Frequency Funhouse, a podcast about local radio.
- 17 March – Bloomin' Legends, a history podcast presented by Johnny Vaughan and Gavin Woods, on Global Player.
- 20 May – You About? with Roman Kemp and Tom Grennan, on BBC Sounds.
- 21 May –
  - Dermot Murnaghan's Legends of News from Radio News Hub.
  - Meeting..., presented by Matt Foister.
- 27 May – Real Women Talk Health, a six-part podcast about women's health issues presented by Sherrie Eugene-Hart, from BCfm.
- 31 May – Capital Breakfast: After the Show, Show!, with Jordan North, Chris Stark and Siân Welby, on Global Player.
- 5 June – Future Tense with Richard Ayoade and Warwick Davis from Audible.
- 26 June – Help! My Child's Anxious, a parenting podcast presented by Vanessa Feltz and Saskia Joss, on Global Player.
- July – Tradeswomen Together with Hattie & Steph, a fortnightly podcast focusing on women in the trades presented by Hattie Hasan and Steph Leese, from Fix Radio.
- 29 August – Big John At Breakfast – FRIDAYS!, a podcast presented by the former weekday presenters on Hallam FM.
- 30 September – The State of It, a weekly political podcast with Patrick Maguire, Gabriel Pogrund, Steven Swinford and Caroline Wheeler, from The Times and The Sunday Times.
- 8 October – Borderland – UK or United Ireland?, a podcast presented by Ian Paisley Jr and Michelle Gildernew.
- 23 October – See What's Possible, a seven-part podcast presented by Myleene Klass in association with Boots Opticians.
- 27 October – The STV Radio Football Show on STV Radio.

== Continuing radio programmes ==
These programmes are still running as of 2025. They are listed by the year they were first broadcast.

=== 1940s ===
- Desert Island Discs (started 1942)
- Woman's Hour (started 1946)
- A Book at Bedtime (started 1949)

=== 1950s ===
- The Archers (started 1950)
- Pick of the Pops (started 1955)
- The Today Programme (started 1957)

=== 1960s ===
- Farming Today (started 1960)
- In Touch (started 1961)
- The World at One (started 1965)
- The Official Chart (started 1967)
- Just a Minute (started 1967)
- The Living World (started 1968)

=== 1970s ===
- PM (started 1970)
- Start the Week (started 1970)
- You and Yours (started 1970)
- I'm Sorry I Haven't a Clue (started 1972)
- Good Morning Scotland (started 1973)
- Newsbeat (started 1973)
- File on 4 (started 1977)
- Money Box (started 1977)
- The News Quiz (started 1977)
- Feedback (started 1979)
- The Food Programme (started 1979)
- Science in Action (started 1979)

=== 1980s ===
- In Business (started 1983)
- Sounds of the 60s (started 1983)
- Loose Ends (started 1986)

=== 1990s ===
- The Moral Maze (started 1990)
- Essential Selection (started 1991)
- Night Waves (started 1992)
- Essential Mix (started 1993)
- Up All Night (started 1994)
- Wake Up to Money (started 1994)
- Private Passions (started 1995)
- In Our Time (started 1998)
- PopMaster (started 1998)
- The Now Show (started 1998)

=== 2000s ===
- BBC Radio 2 Folk Awards (started 2000)
- Big John @ Breakfast (started 2000)
- Sounds of the 70s (2000–2008, resumed 2009)
- Dead Ringers (2000–2007, resumed 2014)
- A Kist o Wurds (started 2002)
- Fighting Talk (started 2003)
- Jeremy Vine (started 2003)
- The Chris Moyles Show (2004–2012, resumed 2015)
- Elaine Paige on Sunday (started 2004)
- The Bottom Line (started 2006)
- The Unbelievable Truth (started 2006)
- Radcliffe & Maconie (started 2007)
- The Media Show (started 2008)
- Newsjack (started 2009)

=== 2010s ===
- The Third Degree (started 2011)
- BBC Radio 1's Dance Anthems (started 2012)
- Sounds of the 80s (started 2013)
- Question Time Extra Time (started 2013)
- The Show What You Wrote (started 2013)
- Inside Science (started 2013)
- Friday Sports Panel (started 2014)
- Stumped (started 2015)
- You, Me and the Big C (started 2018)
- Radio 1's Party Anthems (started 2019)

=== 2020s ===
- Frank Skinner's Poetry Podcast (started 2020)
- Newscast (started 2020)
- Sounds of the 90s (started 2020)
- Life Changes (started 2021)
- Romesh Ranganathan: For The Love of Hip Hop (started 2021)
- The News Agents (started 2022)
- Ten to the Top (started 2023)
- Love Songs with Michael Ball (started 2024)
- Radio 2's The Week-est Link (started 2024)

== Ending this year ==
- 2 January – Trevor Nelson's Rhythm Nation (2019–2025)
- 15 February – Your Place And Mine (1991–2025)

== Deaths ==
- 28 January – Andy Ball, reporter and presenter (BBC Radio Merseyside). (death reported on this date)
- 25 February – Henry Kelly, 78, reporter and presenter (BBC Radio 4, LBC, Classic FM)
- 26 February – Tim Jibson, 76, radio presenter (BBC Radio Humberside, Viking FM) and businessman (owner of KCFM). (death reported on this date)
- 2 March – Bill Dare, 64, radio and television comedy writer.
- 22 March – Andy Peebles, 76, radio DJ (BBC Radio 1), television presenter (Top of the Pops) and cricket commentator.
- 17 April – Colin Berry, 79, British radio disc jockey, presenter and newsreader (BBC Radio 2).
- 23 April – Ian Hickling, 85, radio consultant, engineer and owner of Transplan UK. (death reported on this date)
- 24 May – John Peters, 75, British radio presenter (Radio Trent, Boom Radio).
- 27 June – Simon Marlow, broadcaster and station manager, (BFBS).
- 21 July – Charlie Partridge, former managing director of BBC Radio Lincolnshire.
- 22 July – Lynda Shahwan, 53, producer and presenter (BBC Radio Wales), car accident.
- 25 July – Gerry Kersey, 86, broadcaster (BBC Radio Sheffield, Hallam FM).
- 30 July – Doug Wood, 69, radio presenter (Signal 1).
- 4 August – James Whale, 74, radio presenter (Talksport, LBC, talkRADIO).
- 6 August – Juliet Ace, 87, Welsh-born scriptwriter.
- 11 September – Chris Hill, 80, British disc jockey.
- 25 October – Tom Edwards, 80, British radio presenter (Radio City, Radio Caroline, BBC Radio 1), cancer.
- 20 November – Chris King, 67, presenter (Humber Wave Radio). (death announced on this day)
- 30 November – Brian Hayes, 87, Australian-born British broadcaster.
- 17 December – Sir Humphrey Burton, 94, British television (Aquarius) and radio presenter.
- 26 December – Stewart Francis, 74, British radio executive and broadcaster (LBC, Independent Local Radio), cancer.

== See also ==
- 2025 in the United Kingdom
- 2025 in British music
- 2025 in British television
- List of British films of 2025
