= Kiss Dance =

Coordinates: 51.51598°N 0.13844°W

- The station's logo since April 2026.
- London; United Kingdom
- Broadcast area: National (online) various areas of UK (DAB+)
- Frequencies: DAB/DAB+ Online

Programming
- Format: House, Drum'N'Bass & Garage
- Network: Kiss Network

Ownership
- Owner: Bauer Media Audio UK
- Sister stations: Kiss; Kiss Xtra; Kisstory

History
- First air date: 15 August 2019

Links
- Website: hellorayo.co.uk/kiss-dance/

Kiss Dance (stylised as KISS Dance or KISS DANCE) is a British digital radio station owned and operated by Bauer as part of the Kiss Network.

As of December 2025, according to RAJAR, the station has a weekly audience of 86,000.

The station was launched in August 2019 in conjunction with the launch of several other online-only sister stations to Bauer's Kiss Network and Absolute Radio Network.

In December 2021, the station launched on the Bauer North Cumbria DAB Multiplex, along with several other Bauer owned brands, including CFM, Scala Radio and sister stations Kiss Garage and Kiss Bliss.

== History ==
The station was launched on 15 August 2019 along with several new sister stations for the Kiss and Absolute Radio Networks. Its output is non-stop dance music. Like its online-only sister stations, it has no programming.

Kiss Dance was initially stylised as "KISS DNCE" during its launch; however, shortly afterwards, it was switched to the more conventional spelling.

=== Cumbria DAB expansion ===
From December 2021, Kiss Dance, along with several other Bauer brands, launched on the new North Cumbria 11B DAB Multiplex owned and operated by Bauer Digital Radio.

=== Transition to full-fledged radio station ===
In September 2024, the station received presenter airtime, predominantly re-aired dance shows from the main Kiss station. Between December 2024 and January 2025, several Kiss specialist presenters moved to Kiss Dance permanently, including Leftwing:Kody and TCTS.

In April 2026, every Kiss specialist DJ (with the exception of DJ Hix) moved to Kiss Dance permanently, including DJ Q, Mark Knight, Majestic and Anton Powers. Along with this move, several new presenters were given shows on the station: Rio Fredrika, Talina and Flo. These changes went along with a rebranding campaign.

In summer 2026, the DAB+ availability of Kiss Dance, along with Kiss Xtra, Absolute Radio 00s, and Hits Radio Pride, was expanded to multiple additional areas, generally by converting existing Bauer capacity to the DAB+ format.
