= Q Radio =

Former UK radio station run by Q magazine

- United Kingdom

Programming
- Format: Rock, Alternative rock

Ownership
- Owner: Bauer Verlagsgruppe

History
- First air date: 2 June 2008
- Last air date: 7 May 2013

Links
- Website: www.qthemusic.com/qradio

Q Radio was a British digital radio station broadcasting online, on DAB and DTV across the UK. The station launched in 2008 as an alternative to the UK's rock and alternative stations, with a strong relationship with Q magazine. The station formed part of the Bauer Passion Portfolio. Coinciding with the launch of Kiss spin-off stations Kisstory and Kiss Fresh, Q Radio closed in 2013.

== History ==
After running for several years as an online digital jukebox, former controller of BBC 6 Music and Capital Radio, and Top of the Pops executive producer Ric Blaxill was recruited to form a full station.

Q Radio launched on DAB in London on 2 June 2008 with a full schedule including Samanthi (formerly of XFM and BBC2's "Desi DNA") and comedian and 2008 If.comeddies nominee Russell Kane. Co-founder of Acid Jazz records Eddie Piller also presented a weekly show and musician Billy Bragg presented a monthly programme.

The station launched with a Coldplay interview with Samanthi on QPM, where Chris Martin revealed that the band planned to release sessions with Kylie Minogue. Other guests in interview and sessions between June 2008 to March 2009 included Lily Allen, Kim Deal, Jane Birkin, Pete Shelley, The Futureheads, The Young Knives, White Lies, Ladyhawke and We Are Scientists. The first song played live on the station was Rocks by Primal Scream.

The station relaunched in April 2009 with a new playlist and all-new line-up. It moved to Kerrang! Radio's headquarters in Birmingham, West Midlands and was run by Kerrang! Radio's programming team. The playlist itself was managed by James Walshe and Loz Guest, both of whom also ran the playlist at Kerrang! Radio.

In May 2009, the station was removed from Virgin Media and Sky, along with The Hits Radio, Heat Radio, Smash Hits Radio and Kerrang! Radio.

In May 2010, it was taken off DAB. Although cost of carriage on DAB was suspected, the reason given by Bauer Media was: "At this stage of its development, it has become clear that Q Radio is best served by having national coverage on Freeview and online."

Coinciding with the launch of Kiss spin-off stations Kisstory and KissFresh, Q Radio closed on 7 May 2013.

== Former presenters ==
- Samanthi
- Russell Kane
- Eddie Piller
- The Broken Hearts
- Billy Bragg
- David Quantick
- Mark Somers
- Lynsey Hooper
- Adam Catterall
- Phil Marriott
- Allan Lake
- Dave Everly
- Ted Kessler
- Jim Coulson
- Dan Morfitt
- Simon Hill
- Craig Pilling
- Luke Wilkins
- Amy Jones
- Emma Scott
- Stuart Cable
- Henry Evans
- James Everton
- Matt Stocks
- Simon James
- Pete Allison
- Jake Thomson
- Paul Rees
- Danielle Perry
- Alex James
- Vicky Warham
- Andy Westcott
- Matthew Rudd
- Louis Chadwick
- Dan Black
- Phil MacKenzie
- Kevin Hingley
- Loz Guest
- Pete Bailey
- Michelle Owen
- Jon Jackson

== See also ==
- List of radio stations in the United Kingdom
- Bauer Radio
