= Kiss Xtra =

Coordinates: 51.51598°N 0.13844°W

- The station's logo since 2026.
- United Kingdom
- Frequency: DAB/DAB+

Programming
- Format: Hip-hop & R&B
- Network: Kiss Network

Ownership
- Owner: Bauer Media Audio UK
- Sister stations: Kiss; Kisstory; Absolute Radio; Greatest Hits Radio; Heat Radio; Hits Radio; Jazz FM; Kerrang! Radio; Magic; Planet Rock

History
- First air date: 7 May 2013
- Former names: KISS Fresh

Links
- Webcast: Rayo
- Website: KISS Xtra

Kiss Xtra (stylised in all uppercase, formerly Kiss Fresh), is a British digital radio station owned and operated by Bauer Media Audio UK as part of the Kiss Network.

As of February 2026, the station has a weekly audience of 284,000 listeners, according to RAJAR.

== History ==
Initially provided over Freeview (replacing Smash Hits Radio) and online, the station was made available via digital radio in the London area, alongside sister station Kisstory, from 12 December 2014.

The DAB availability of Kiss Fresh extended beyond London from 1 May 2016, with the station being made available in some (but not all) of the areas previously served by Kisstory on local DAB, this capacity having been released following the migration of Kisstory to Sound Digital.

=== National DAB expansion ===
From 10 July 2017, Kiss Fresh itself expanded to national DAB availability, joining the lineup of services on Digital One alongside the parent Kiss FM UK service; as part of the move the Kiss Fresh schedule and playlist was revised to better differentiate Kiss Fresh from its sibling. On 6 November 2017 it was removed from Digital One and replaced by pop-up station Magic Christmas, and subsequently Absolute Radio 90s used the slot during 2018: a reshuffle of DAB capacity in February 2019 ahead of the launch of Scala Radio ultimately put Kisstory in this slot on D1. Kiss Fresh reverted to transmitting solely on local-level DAB, remaining nationally available via Freeview.

=== Reduction in DAB carriage and loss of Freeview slot ===
Most DAB carriage of Kiss Fresh ended at the end of March 2019 when the local-tier DAB slots were largely turned over to the new Country Hits Radio. (In Northern Ireland, where Bauer already operated Downtown Country, the Kiss Fresh slot went to Greatest Hits Radio). Kiss Fresh continued to broadcast nationally via Freeview and online.

In March 2024 it was announced that Kiss Fresh, and other Bauer-owned stations including Kiss and Kisstory, would be removed from the Freeview TV platform from 2 April 2024; this followed the exit of Kiss and other Bauer services from the satellite and cable TV platforms in late 2023.

Kiss Fresh is available on DAB+ in London and Cumbria, as well as via Bauer's streaming app, Rayo.

=== Rebrand to Kiss Xtra ===
On 10 March 2025, station owners Bauer announced that Kiss Fresh would rebrand as Kiss Xtra from 31 March 2025, relaunching it that day at 8am.

In summer 2026, the DAB+ availability of Kiss Xtra, along with Kiss Dance, Absolute Radio 00s, and Hits Radio Pride, was expanded to multiple additional areas, generally by converting existing Bauer capacity to the DAB+ format.

== Programming ==
Programming is produced and broadcast from Bauer's London headquarters at The Lantern.

== Technical ==
Kiss Xtra broadcasts on DAB+.

== Logo history ==
The station's logo from 2013 to 2015.

The station's logo from 2015 to 2025.

The station's logo from 2025 to 2026.
