= Magic Classical =

UK digital radio station

Coordinates: 51.5122°N 0.1369°W

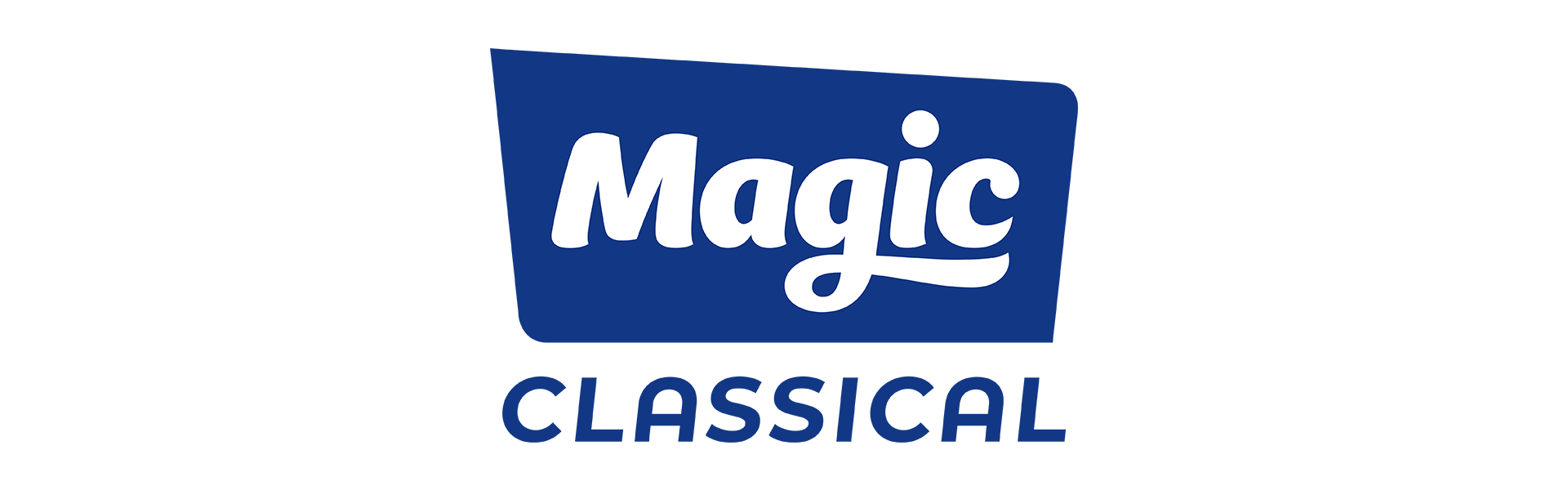
- London; United Kingdom
- Broadcast area: United Kingdom
- Frequency: DAB: 11A Sound Digital

Programming
- Format: Classical

Ownership
- Owner: Bauer Media Audio UK
- Sister stations: Absolute Radio; Greatest Hits Radio; Heat Radio; Hits Radio; Jazz FM; Kerrang Radio; Kiss; Magic Radio; Planet Rock

History
- First air date: 4 March 2019
- Former names: Scala Radio

Links
- Webcast: Rayo
- Website: Magic Classical

Magic Classical (formerly Scala Radio) is a British digital radio station owned and operated by Bauer Media Audio UK. The station was launched in March 2019 as Scala Radio and broadcasts nationally on DAB Digital Radio, via smart speaker, app, and online. The station was the first national classical music service to launch on terrestrial radio in the UK since Classic FM in 1992.

The station's playlist features 70% popular classics and 30% new and "surprising" music. Scala also aimed to produce more speech content – or more "storytelling" – than Classic FM or BBC Radio 3.

== History ==
On 22 December 2018, following the demise of his BBC Radio 2 drivetime show – which had been co-hosted with Jo Whiley since May 2018 – Simon Mayo revealed that "...the new radio show will be announced in January. It will be startling."

A month later, on 21 January 2019, Bauer Radio announced plans to launch a new national classical music service under the name Scala Radio from March, with Mayo having signed up to be one of the lead presenters of the new station. More information about presenters and their shows was confirmed in February 2019.

Scala Radio launched at 10am on 4 March 2019, with Simon Mayo hosting the first live programme. The first track played was the prélude to Carmen Suite No. 1 by Georges Bizet.

Advance weekly listings for Scala Radio were published from launch in Radio Times and the Bauer-owned Total TV Guide. The Radio Times removed listings for BBC Radio 1Xtra and details of news and weather bulletins on Radios 1 and 2 to make space for the new station.

The station launched on Sky on 1 May 2019 on channel 0216 (later moved to channel 0151). It was removed on 14 December 2022, and was replaced by sister station Greatest Hits Radio on the platform.

Changes made to the programming schedule from 2 March 2024 resulted in a presenter-less format for most weekday slots, in response to falling listening figures; however, the weekday breakfast show continued to be presented by Charles Nove. The changes also led to the loss of Mark Kermode, Luci Holland, Richard Allinson, Sam Hughes, and Mark Forrest as presenters.

On 16 September 2024, the station was rebranded to Magic Classical, as part of Bauer Media Audio's "Magic"-branded stations.

Schedule changes on 9 June 2025 saw the return of weekday daytime and evening presenters – Tim Smith and Fran Godfrey (both formerly at Radio 2), and Jo Cochrane (from Forth 1 and Magic Soul) – while Tony Minvielle joined from sister station Jazz FM for a Friday-night programme.

== Presenters ==
The presenters on Magic Classical include a range of radio and television personalities, some of whom have previously presented on other Bauer stations, as well as with competitor stations such as Classic FM. The current presenters with regular shows are:

- YolanDa Brown
- Hannah Cox
- Charles Nove
- Jack Pepper
- Darren Redick
- Ayanna Witter-Johnson
- Tim Smith
- Jo Cochrane
- Fran Godfrey
- Tony Minvielle
- Sonali Shah

=== Former presenters ===
- Gemma Cairney
- DJ Spoony
- Goldie
- Sister Bliss
- William Orbit
- Chris Rogers
- Anthea Turner
- Midge Ure
- Jamie Crick
- Angellica Bell
- Danielle Perry
- Mark Kermode
- Alexis Ffrench
- Luci Holland
- Mark Forrest
- Sam Hughes
- Richard Allinson
- Penny Smith
- Simon Mayo

== Audience ==
According to RAJAR data, the station has a weekly reach of 219,000 people as of October 2024.

== Activities ==
=== Album of the Week ===
Magic Classical recommends an album weekly as their Album of the Week, and conducts relevant give-away activities.
