= Magic (UK radio station) =

Adult contemporary radio station in London

Coordinates: 51°30′43.53″N 0°8′12.99″W

Magic Radio
- Magic Radio's logo since 2025.
- London; England
- Broadcast area: United Kingdom
- Frequencies: FM: 105.4 MHz (London); 106.5 MHz (Bristol); DAB+: 11D (England/Wales/N. Ireland); 12A (Scotland); 12C (London)
- RDS: MAGIC

Programming
- Format: AC/MOR

Ownership
- Owner: Bauer Media Audio UK
- Sister stations: Absolute Radio; Greatest Hits Radio; Heat Radio; Hits Radio; Jazz FM; Kerrang Radio; Kiss; Planet Rock

History
- First air date: 9 July 1990
- Former names: Melody FM (1990–1998)

Links
- Webcast: Rayo
- Website: Magic

Magic Radio is a British digital radio station owned and operated by Bauer Media Audio UK. The station is available on 105.4 FM in London, 106.5 FM in Bristol and across the UK on DAB Digital Radio, via Bauer's Rayo platform, and on Smart speakers. It plays "adult contemporary" such as Elton John, Madonna, Ed Sheeran, Whitney Houston, UB40, Simply Red, and more.

It had previously been a part of a network of Magic stations broadcast on FM in London and on MW across northern England and began broadcasting across the UK via the Digital One multiplex in January 2015. On 5 January 2015, Magic Radio launched nationally on DAB and all other Magic stations were dissolved to form the Bauer City 2 network.

According to RAJAR, the station broadcast to an average weekly audience of 2.4 million during the July to August 2025 quarter, with the Magic Radio network of stations reaching an average weekly audience of 3.5 million during the same period.

== History ==
The Magic name was first used in 1990 when Leeds station Radio Aire launched an oldies station called Magic 828 on its MW frequency. Seven years later, the Magic brand was rolled out on MW across Yorkshire and north east England and the stations adopted a soft adult contemporary music format.

In 1998, easy music station Melody FM, which had also launched in 1990, was purchased by media group Emap from Hanson plc for a reported £25 million and rebranded to Magic that December and the change saw Emap introduce automation for the first time - weekday afternoons were split with a 'non-stop music hour', first sponsored by the now defunct energy company Calortex, and later by the Emap-owned Red magazine. Magic was criticised for automating a further eleven hours of its daily output (7pm-6am) given the reach and size of the station.

In an attempt to cut costs, Magic began networking its mid-morning show, hosted by Richard Skinner, and automated overnight output with the eight other Magic stations in the North of England in January 2002. Audience figures fell on all nine stations in the twelve months that followed, some arguing a lack of local content had driven listeners to tune away. Networking was ended in January 2003, although the eight 'northern' Magic stations continued to share a mid-morning show, hosted by Mark Thorburn, and were subsequently networked again, with the exception of local breakfast shows, following a repositioning of the northern Magic group in mid-2006. These stations were later rebranded into the Bauer City 2 network in 2015.

The end of networking heralded a programming shift; Magic adopting its 'more music, less talk' ethos. Former Capital FM head and radio consultant Richard Park was brought in to increase the station's audience share. In September 2003, Magic saw its first major revamp: live programming replaced automated output in the evening, and Independent Radio News-employed personnel staffed the station's daytime news output, removing shared presenting/newsreading responsibilities, a legacy from Melody FM. IRN retained the contract to supply Magic's news bulletins until 2015, when the service was brought in-house.

Later years saw a reliance on weekend celebrity-hosted content and large cash prizes to entice listeners - the award of £110,600 to Nicola Diss, the winner of the popular Magic Mystery Voices contest on 12 January 2006 was the largest cash prize given away on UK radio since 1999, a sum surpassed just a few months later by the prize collected by listener Dawn Muggleton in the Smooth Secret Song competition on London rival 102.2 Smooth FM, scooping £118,454 on 19 April 2006. However, Magic regained the honour on 30 March 2007 with listener Maria Crosskey winning £168,600 in a six-month-long Mystery Voices contest, although she was later disqualified (see 'Mystery Voices' below).

In 2008, Emap sold its radio stations, including Magic, to Bauer Media Group.

Magic, along with urban/dance station Kiss, rock music station Absolute Radio and a number of other radio brands, broadcasts from Bauer Radio's headquarters at The Lantern in Euston. It had previously broadcast from studios on Winsley Street (Mappin House), and, from September 2014 to March 2024, Golden Square in Soho.

On 2 April 2024, Magic ceased transmitting on the Freeview digital television platform after 21 years, as it and other Bauer stations completed their withdrawal from linear TV platforms, having dropped satellite transmission in late 2023.

On 27 December 2024, Magic rebranded to Magic Radio dropping the strapline "More Of The Songs You Love" and changing it to "The Best Variety from the 80s to Now". Magic Radio refreshed their jingles which are now branded as "Magic Radio" instead of "Magic". The station also changed its format, moving from soft adult contemporary to adult contemporary, playing more music from the 2010s and 2020s, retaining the usual 80s, 90s & 00s music.

On 31 March 2025, Magic Radio switched to DAB+ across the UK. The change means that listeners can now hear the station in stereo.

The same day also saw Magic Radio launch in Bristol on 106.5FM, at 12:07am.

On 16 May 2025, Magic Radio completed its refresh by launching a new logo.

== Sister stations ==
=== Magic Chilled ===
Launched March 2016 and plays "fresh laid-back hits", predominantly pop and R&B from the 90s to today (which ended up as the slogan for the station: Pop + R&B: 90's-Now);the format originated as an evening programme strand on Heat Radio (as 'heat Chilled') but moved under the Magic brand to be launched as a full-time station, and as a permanent part of the network. Magic Chilled was Bauer's first DAB+ station. It was originally broadcast on the national Sound Digital multiplex, moved to local tier DAB, in capacity previously used by Absolute Radio 90s, in early 2019 as part of the reorganisation of space for the launch of Scala Radio, then reverted to broadcast on Sound Digital in DAB+ in October 2023, following the conversion of stations including Scala and Mellow Magic to DAB+. In London, Magic Chilled continued to be broadcast in DAB+ at the same bitrate as before but in stereo

At 7PM (UK) on Monday 16 September 2024, Magic Chilled was formally rebranded and relaunched across all platforms under the new name of Hits Radio Chilled, with the new slogan "Laid-Back Hits & Throwbacks". This tied in to the Hits Radio slogan "The Biggest Hits, The Biggest Throwbacks". This followed an announcement in July, and weeks of jingles being rebranded to the Hits Radio jingle and voices informing people of the change. This move, one of a few shake-ups in the Bauer UK radio portfolio, transferred the station to the Hits Radio Network, another of Bauer Media UK's radio brands and networks. Cian Ducrot presented the first show under the new name, and with his song "All For You" being the first track on the new station.

=== Mellow Magic ===
Mellow Magic is a digital-only service of timeless relaxing classics, launched in March 2016 along with Magic Chilled. It continues to broadcast as part of the Sound Digital national multiplex jointly owned by Bauer. The Mellow Magic station was built on the successful Magic night-time programming strand of the same name. Fran Godfrey has hosted the breakfast show on Mellow Magic, since the station's official launch; the station previously simulcast the Mellow Magic programmes of the main Magic station, but this ceased when Magic temporarily flipped to a Christmas music format. in autumn 2023; shortly afterward, Mellow Magic switched its digital radio broadcast from mono DAB to stereo DAB+ but ultimately remained active as a permanent part of the network.

On 28 February 2025, Fran Godfrey is stepping down on breakfast but she will be staying on Mellow Magic doing Sunday Afternoons from 12pm until 4pm. The replacement will be Jen Thomas.

On 3 March 2025, Mellow Magic has refreshed their jingles matching Magic Radio's jingles.

On 9 May 2025, Mellow Magic is dropping the strapline "Timeless Relaxing Classics" and changing it to "Best Variety of Relaxing Classics."

On 16 May 2025, Mellow Magic has redone their logo to complete their refresh.

On 19 January 2026, Jen Thomas is stepping down from her position on Mellow Magic Breakfast, She will be moving to Magic Musicals Afternoons & Virgin Radio UK on Saturday & Sunday from 2am to 6am. Claire Sturgess will be taking over her role from 2 February 2026.

=== Magic Soul ===
This was originally a temporary pop-up service, branded as Magic Soul Summer, which launched in the summer of 2016 largely taking over the capacity previously occupied by the temporary Magic ABBA station; the soul service ultimately remained active as a permanent part of the network, truncating its name to Magic Soul from Autumn 2016 onwards. The station broadcast on local DAB until moving to broadcast in stereo DAB+ in October 2023 along with Magic Chilled, Mellow Magic and Magic at the Musicals.

On 17 March 2025, Magic Soul has refreshed their jingles matching Magic Radio's jingles.

On 8 May 2025, Magic Soul is dropping the strapline "The best of Soul and Motown." and changing it to "Best Variety of Soul and Motown."

On 16 May 2025, Magic Soul has redone their logo to complete their refresh.

=== Magic Musicals ===
Launched on DAB+ in London on 21 November 2019; the station has since been rolled out to several other areas, chiefly on selected Bauer-owned multiplexes, in standard DAB, moving to broadcast nationally on stereo DAB+ in October 2023, but ultimately remained active as a permanent part of the network. It plays show-tunes and soundtracks.

On 24 March 2025, Magic at the Musicals refreshed their jingles to match Magic Radio's jingles.

On 7 May 2025, Magic at the Musicals rebranded to Magic Musicals dropping the strapline "The Greatest Musicals of All Time" and changing it to "Best Variety of Stage and Screen". Magic at the Musicals refreshed their jingles which is now branded as "Magic Musicals" instead of "Magic at the Musicals".

On 16 May 2025, Magic Musicals has redone their logo to complete their refresh.

On 5 May 2026, Jen Thomas is presenting the Magic Musicals Breakfast, after 7 years of no breakfast show since its launch.

=== Pop-ups ===
==== Magic ABBA ====
Following the migration of other Bauer services (including Kisstory and Heat Radio) to SDL, some of the vacated space at local level was used during the spring of 2016 for a short-term pop-up, playing ABBA songs (and versions thereof) and related content. It ran as a commercial partnership with Mamma Mia!: the Musical.

==== Magic Workout ====
An online-only sibling, Magic Workout has been made available as one of a suite of streaming-only Bauer services. The temporary service formed part of Magic's partnership with breast cancer charity Walk The Walk's Moonwalk event. A similar service, Cool FM Workout, was launched by Bauer in partnership with the Belfast City Marathon in 2021.

==== Magic Christmas / Magic 100% Christmas ====
In late 2017, a slot on the Digital One multiplex which had been occupied since the summer by Kiss Fresh was temporarily used by a Christmas music station under the Magic Christmas banner; it was one of two festive stations available on D1 that year, with Heart Extra making its annual switch to Heart Extra Christmas around the same time. (During 2018, this capacity was used by Absolute Radio 90s, and since February 2019 the space has been occupied by Kisstory). In December 2018 and 2019, the main Magic station flipped to an all-Christmas playlist, and so a discrete Christmas station was not provided.

Magic 100% Christmas was launched online in August 2020, several months earlier than previous Christmas music stations in order to, according to Bauer, help lift the mood of the nation in the COVID-19 pandemic. Unlike the earlier Magic Christmas, this service did not broadcast on DAB.

On 1 September 2025, Magic Christmas was launched on DAB and online, 115 days before 25 December.

On 17 September 2026, Magic Christmas launches on DAB once again for 100 days before 25 December.

==== Bond 24/7 ====
Bond 24/7 was a pop-up station which ran from 29 September to 6 October 2021. It was launched to mark the release of the 25th film in the James Bond series No Time to Die and would play music from the James Bond films.

=== Television ===
==== Magic TV ====
There was also a complementary Magic-branded music television channel available on the Sky, Freesat and Virgin Media digital TV platforms in the UK, operating as part of The Box Plus Network. The channel played classic and contemporary melodic pop hits.

== Main presenters ==
- Anna Richardson
- Dan Morrissey
- Gaby Roslin
- Gok Wan
- Harriet Scott
- Jo Russell
- Kat Shoob
- Lemar Obika
- Lynn Parsons
- Mel Giedroyc
- Miri Green
- Neev Spencer
- Nick Snaith
- Nicki Chapman
- Paul Hayes
- Rich Clarke
- Sonali Shah
- Tom Price

== Cover presenters ==
- Lucy Horobin
- Joanna Page
