= Q (magazine) =

British music magazine and online publication

- Special commemorative issue (September 2020)
- Categories: Music magazine
- Frequency: Monthly
- Circulation: 44,050 (ABC Jul – Dec 2015); Print and digital editions.
- Publisher: Bauer Media Group
- First issue: October 1986
- Final issue: July 2020
- Country: United Kingdom
- Based in: London
- Language: English
- Website: qthemusic.com
- ISSN: 0955-4955

Q was a British popular music magazine. It was founded in 1986 by broadcast journalists Mark Ellen and David Hepworth, who were presenters of the BBC television music series The Old Grey Whistle Test. Q was published in print in the UK from 1986 until July 2020. In 2023, it was revived as an online publication, which ran until May 2024.

== History ==
Q was originally published by the EMAP media group and set itself apart from much of the other music press with monthly production and higher standards of photography and printing. In the early years, the magazine was sub-titled "The modern guide to music and more". Originally it was to be called Cue (as in the sense of cueing a record, ready to play), but the name was changed so that it would not be mistaken for a snooker magazine. Another reason, cited in Q's 200th edition, is that a single-letter title would be more prominent on newsstands.

In January 2008, EMAP sold its consumer magazine titles, including Q, to the Bauer Media Group. Bauer put the title up for sale in 2020, alongside Car Mechanic, Modern Classics, Your Horse, and Sea Angler. Publication ceased in July 2020 as Kelsey Media decided to buy a number of non-music titles from Bauer (Sea Angler, Car Mechanics and Your Horse), making the 28 July 2020 issue (Q415) the last to be published. The end of the print version of Q was blamed both on lower circulation and advertising revenue caused by the COVID-19 pandemic, as well as being "a symptom of an expert-free internet age."

After the sale of the brand to Empire Media Group, Q was soft launched as an online publication in November 2023, posting new content along with articles from their archive. It was officially relaunched in January 2024, with a new editorial team spearheaded by US Editor Andrew Barker in Los Angeles and Oxford-based UK and Europe Editor, Dominic Utton. In May 2024 the magazine ceased operations. Six full-time journalists were laid off.

== Original print magazine ==
First issue of Q (October 1986)

The magazine had an extensive review section, featuring new releases, reissues, compilations, film and live concert reviews, as well as radio and television reviews. Each review included a rating from one to five stars. While its content was non-free they hosted an archive of all of their magazine covers.

Much of the magazine was devoted to interviews with popular music artists. According to Alexis Petridis of The Guardian, it was originally set up after the success of "rock’s old stagers" at Live Aid, which co-founders Mark Ellen and David Hepworth had co-presented, to focus on long-established acts that appealed to an older music market, such as Paul McCartney, Rod Stewart, Paul Simon, Elton John, Genesis, and Eric Clapton. It also compiled lists, ranging from "The 100 Greatest Albums" to "The 100 Richest Stars in Rock", with a special edition magazine called "The 150 Greatest Rock Lists Ever" published in July 2004. Q also produced a number of special editions devoted to a single act/artist like U2 or Nirvana, but these magazines stopped in 2018, with its sister magazine, Mojo (also owned by Bauer) continuing to produce specials devoted to artists like Bob Dylan.

Promotional gifts were given away, such as cover-mounted CDs or books. The January 2006 issue included a free copy of "The Greatest Rock and Pop Miscellany … Ever!", modelled on Schott's Original Miscellany. Each issue of Q had a different message on the spine. Some readers tried to work out what the message had to do with the contents of the magazine. This practice (known as the "spine line") has since become commonplace among British lifestyle magazines, including Q's sister publication Empire and the football monthly FourFourTwo.

In February 2012, Andrew Harrison was recruited as editor, replacing Paul Rees during a difficult period when on-line publishing had led to a 17% decline in the magazine's circulation in the first half of 2012. It had fallen to 64,596 units; a reduction in volume described by The Guardian as "the worst performance of any music magazine in the period". Directly reporting to Publishing Director Rimi Atwal of Bauer Media Group, Harrison's brief said to "refocus" and revive the magazine and to that end he took on a number of new journalists launching the magazine's iPad edition, but decided against a rebranding. Under his tenure, Q was named "Magazine of the Year" at the 2012 "Record of the Day" awards. He left just 14 months later, according to the Guardian, "as print music magazines continue to endure torrid times" and even free titles were failing to compete against blogs and platforms dependent on online advertising.

In July 2020, Bauer published a Special Collector's Issue of the magazine (Q414), which it had intended to be the last edition before deciding to attempt to sell the publication to another media group. This issue was more of a 'throwback' publication, similar to what Mojo had been doing, and featured articles and acts from 34 years of Q magazine. With other firms, such as Long Live Vinyl's owner Anthem Publishing, ending the publication of a number of monthly music magazine titles, a buyer could not be found for the title, with editor Ted Kessler announcing that issue Q415 would be the last, on 20 July 2020.

== Notable articles ==
In the early days of publication, the magazine's format was much closer in tone to that of Rolling Stone (though with some of the characteristic humour of former Smash Hits staff shining through), with Tom Hibbert's "Who The Hell..." feature (including interviews with people like Jeffrey Archer, Robert Maxwell, Ronnie Biggs and Bernard Manning) and film reviews. After EMAP started to publish a new magazine called Empire in 1989 (the idea being that Empire would be 'Q with films'), the movie reviews migrated to the new publication, with Q becoming a magazine focused on music (one found for sale alongside Select and Vox in various magazine racks).

In the 1990s, former NME staff writers, such as Andrew Collins, Danny Kelly, Stuart Maconie, and Charles Shaar Murray joined Paul Du Noyer and Adrian Deevoy at Q. Music coverage in IPC's 'inkie' indie weekly was becoming more serious after Melody Maker closed down and so writers like Maconie felt more at home at a publication that would still run tongue-in-cheek articles such as "40 Celebs About Whom We Only Know One Thing" and "Do I Have To Wear This, Boss?" (Du Noyer's feature about every band having a member who looks out of place in the line-up).

In 2006, Q published a readers' survey, "The 100 Greatest Songs Ever", which was topped by Oasis' "Live Forever". In the April 2007 issue, Q published an article listing "The 100 Greatest Singers", which was topped by Elvis Presley. Lady Gaga posed topless in a shoot for the April 2010 issue of the magazine, which was banned by stores in the United States due to the singer revealing too much of her breasts.

== Other Q brands ==
After a few years as a radio jukebox, Q Radio launched in June 2008 as a full-service radio station with a complete roster. Shows and presenters include Drivetime with Danielle Perry and Q the 80s with Matthew Rudd. The station was transmitted on the digital television networks in the UK and online. Coldplay were involved with the launch of the station by giving an exclusive interview on Q's flagship programme QPM on the launch day. It was based in Birmingham alongside the now-closed Kerrang! 105.2 after moving from London in 2009. The station was closed in mid-2013 after owners Bauer Media decided to use the station's bandwidth on various platforms (DAB, Digital TV) to launch Kisstory, a spinoff of their Kiss brand. There was a Q TV television channel in the UK, which launched on 2 October 2000 and closed on 3 July 2012.

Q held a yearly awards ceremony called the Q Awards from 1990 until 2019. The Q Awards came to an end along with the publication itself.

== Criticism ==
In the early years, before the magazine's shift in demographic, Q was sneered at as "uncool and lacking edge", with Steven Wells from NME calling it "the magazine that says 'Hey kids, it's alright to like Dire Straits'".

During "the Battle of Britpop" in the mid-1990s, Q was one of many music magazines to retract its original, five-star review for Blur's The Great Escape, due to Oasis's (What's The Story) Morning Glory? - to which Q originally gave a three-star review - being more commercially successful among the contemporary British public; unlike other music magazines, Q was the sole one to apologise for its original review.

According to the global business magazine Campaign in 2008, Q had been criticised for "playing it safe" with its album reviews and cover mounts. In a 2001 interview in Classic Rock, Marillion singer Steve Hogarth criticised Q's refusal to cover the band, despite the magazine publishing several positive reviews and hailing Afraid of Sunlight as "near genius". Hogarth further criticised the magazine's tendency to put bands with lower-ranking or bad reviews in the magazine's articles and covers to enhance sales, questioning why the magazine won't "stop pretending that it's all about music and admit it's really about money?"

In 2005, after winning the Q Legend award at the Q Awards, New Order bassist Peter Hook referred to the magazine as "two-faced cunts who give us bad reviews".
