= Richard Allinson =

British radio personality (born 1958)

Richard John McNeill Allinson (born 12 October 1958) is an English broadcaster with Greatest Hits Radio and Greatest Hits Radio 60s is Creative Director of Magnum Opus Broadcasting. Between 1997 and 2014 he was a disc jockey for BBC Radio 2.

== Early career ==
Allinson was born in Lichfield, Staffordshire. He attended Tudor Grange Grammar School for Boys in Solihull. He started his broadcasting with a 3-year stint at Bailrigg FM, known at that time as University Radio Bailrigg (URB), whilst studying for a BA Hons in Economics at Lancaster University. He was firstly Treasurer and then became President of URB. He rejected a career in the legal profession and, in August 1980, took up broadcasting on London's Capital Radio, presenting their Chart Show. He also presented the Early Breakfast show for some of this period. Following on from Capital's Chart Show, in 1984 he took over the late-night 10 pm – midnight slot. In 1987 he took over the weekday 2 – 4:30 pm slot, followed by the weekday Early Breakfast show 4 – 6:30 am in 1990. In addition to this, in around 1994 he worked alongside Julia Carling on the satellite music television channel VH1, where they hosted a live show together.

== Radio 2 ==
Allinson joined BBC Radio 2 in 1997, presenting the Monday–Thursday late night show from 10:30 pm to midnight, which included a mix of music and guests.

In early 1999, Allinson took over the weekday drivetime show from 5 pm to 7 pm whilst regular presenter Johnnie Walker was off air due to health-related issues. He presented the programme for several months, with Lynn Parsons taking over the late show; in December 1999, Allinson returned to the late night show.

In addition to his late night show, in 2000, Allinson also took over a Saturday afternoon show from 3:30 to 6:30 pm, where he introduced the 'Radio Wall of Sound'. This was where listeners could ring in, listen to a selection of snippets of tunes until they liked one particularly, for it to play as quickly as they'd shouted 'play' or made some other noise dictated by the host after the caller had been probed about their life. They were rewarded with a CD album of their choice.

Allinson stepped down from the late night slot in June 2004, so he could concentrate on fronting Radio 2's 'Live & Exclusive' series and 'Sold on Song' projects. With record producer Steve Levine he formed Magnum Opus Broadcasting to "create programming and content we wanted to hear – but could not find – on the radio. Alongside this, he still continued with his Saturday afternoon show, which was cut down to 2 hours in September 2004 and went out from 4 to 6 pm every Saturday.

It was also during this period that he became the main stand-in for many weekday presenters when taking their holidays, such as Chris Evans, Simon Mayo, Paul O'Grady, Terry Wogan, Ken Bruce, Sarah Kennedy and Steve Wright.

His Saturday show eventually ended in September 2005, but he still continued to stand in for weekday presenters on Radio 2 as well as create and present documentaries and specialist shows for the network, such as The Record Producers, which is usually broadcast from 7 to 8 pm on Bank Holiday Mondays. On Sunday 24 August 2008 Allinson hosted London 2012 Party Live on BBC Radio 2 from The Mall outside Buckingham Palace in London which included the 2008 Beijing Olympics handover musical celebrations.

== BBC Local Radio ==
From 8 January 2006 until 24 February 2007, Allinson presented a regular weekly show on BBC Radio Oxford on Sunday mornings from 9 am to 12 noon. The show included a mix of music, guests, competitions and a look at headlines from the Sunday papers. From January 2007, he presented the two-hour live show Allinson's Albums between 12 and 2 pm every Saturday on BBC Radio Oxford, and from 4 March 2007 was repeated on Sundays from 5 to 7 pm. The show was also broadcast on BBC Radio York on Saturday lunchtimes from 1 to 3 pm, and on BBC Radio Cumbria each Wednesday evening, repeated on Sunday afternoons; the last edition of this was broadcast on 6 January 2013.

== Other work ==
Allinson has been heard on the various BFBS (British Forces) radio networks since 1980, first on Most Wanted for BFBS Radio 1, where he played mostly new music with a cutting edge, later moving to BFBS UK and others, and moved to BFBS Radio 2 in 2003 presenting in a style which the public have grown accustomed to with his shows on BBC Radio 2. From October 2006 he took over a daily show for the network, going out Mondays-Fridays from 9 to 11 am UK time, which he presented until March 2008. Richard has also been known to present shows on the BBC World Service. Allinson acted as the stadium announcer at the Concert for Diana on 1 July 2007.

== Return to Radio 2 ==
From 2009, Allinson returned to BBC Radio 2 on a regular basis, presenting the weekend overnight slots, replacing Pete Mitchell and Mo Dutta's slots. The show went out on Friday nights/Saturday mornings and Saturday nights/Sunday mornings from 3 to 6 am and was produced by production company Somethin' Else. He also presented an occasional series called The Record Producers, which went out on Bank Holiday Mondays. In October 2014 his weekend show was cancelled due to budget cuts at Radio 2. He hasn't done any cover work for Radio 2 since moving to Magic Radio.

== Magic Radio ==
From 27 October 2014 to 9 April 2021 Allinson presented the weekday drivetime show, before taking on weekend evenings on Magic Radio. He presented his last show for Magic in March 2022.

== Greatest Hits Radio and Scala ==
He joined Greatest Hits Radio on 26 February 2022, and has taken over Janice Long's Saturday afternoon slot from 1- 5pm. In addition to that, he took over the Monday to Thursday evening show from 7 – 10pm on Scala Radio. On 22 May 2023, Allinson moved to Scala Radio's drivetime slot at 4 – 7pm. This ended in March 2024 as the station opted for a less presenter approach in the afternoons.

Following on from the departure of Mark Goodier from Greatest Hits Radio, since May 2024, Allinson can be heard hosting the Saturday and Sunday mid morning slot from 9am-1pm. Richard also occasionally covers the Ken Bruce show.

In addition to this, on 16th September 2024, Since the Greatest Hits Radio 60s launch, Allinson can also be heard presenting the 6 - 10am breakfast show every Monday to Friday.

== Radio credits ==
- Capital London Chart Show, Sundays, 1980–1984
- Capital London Late Show, weekdays 10 pm – midnight, 1984–1987
- Capital London Afternoon Show, weekdays 2 – 4:30 pm, 1987–1990
- Capital London Early Breakfast Show, weekdays 5 – 7 am, 1990–1997
- BBC Radio 2 Late Nights, Monday–Thursday 10:30 pm – midnight, March 1997 – June 2004
- BBC Radio 2 Saturday Afternoons, 3:30 – 6:30 pm, April 2000 – September 2004; 4 – 6pm September 2004 – September 2005
- BBC Radio 2 Record Producers, (alongside Steve Levine) Bank Holiday Mondays 7 – 8 pm, 2006–2012
- BBC Radio 2 Record Producers, ( alongside Steve Levine ) New Years Day 6 – 7 pm, 2007
- BBC Radio Oxford Sunday Mornings, 9 am – midday, January 2006 – February 2007
- BBC Radio Oxford Allinson's Albums, Saturdays midday – 2 pm, January 2007 – May 2009
- BBC Radio York Allinson's Albums, Saturdays 1 – 3 pm, May 2007–2013
- BBC Radio Cumbria Allinson's Albums Sundays, June 2008 – May 2009; Wednesdays and Sundays, June 2009 – January 2013
- BBC Radio 2 Weekend Overnights Friday night/Saturday morning and Saturday night/Sunday morning, 3 – 6 am, 2009 – 2014
- Magic Radio Weekday Drivetime, 5 – 8 pm Monday–Friday, 2014 – 2021
- Magic Radio Weekend Evenings, 7 – 10 pm Friday–Sunday, 2021 – March 2022
- Greatest Hits Radio Saturday Afternoons, 1 – 5 pm Saturday, February 2022 – April 2024
- Scala Radio Monday to Thursday Evenings, 7 – 10 pm, April 2022 – May 2023
- Scala Radio Monday to Friday Afternoons, 4 – 7 pm, May 2023 – March 2024
- Greatest Hits Radio Saturday–Sunday 9 am – 1 pm, May 2024 – present
- Greatest Hits Radio 60s Monday–Friday 6 am – 10 am, September 2024 – present
