= Danielle Perry =

British DJ

- Born: 4 June 1980 (age 46); Bournemouth, England, United Kingdom
- Presenting career
- Station: Absolute Radio (2015–present)
- Time slot: Monday to Thursday: 7–10pm; Sunday: 8pm – midnight
- Country: United Kingdom

Danielle Perry (born 4 June 1980) is an English radio presenter and musician.

Perry studied for her BA (Hons) Music degree at Southampton University. After graduating, she started doing her apprenticeship making the tea at various local radio stations on the south coast of England.

== Radio ==
After a few years fronting shows on Power and Ocean FM for GCap Media, Perry moved to The Coast (CanWest Media) where she met triple Sony award-winning presenters Simon James and Hill. It was not long before Perry was invited up to Kerrang! Radio to join them on the breakfast show, which went on to win a bronze Sony Radio Award. Following success on the breakfast show, Perry was promoted to the daytime presenter at West Midlands station Kerrang! Radio — Perry achieved huge results in this role, on occasions the biggest audience figures on the station.

From 22 April 2013 until 21 April 2015, Perry worked for XFM London to present the weekday evening show 7-10pm (7-9pm on Thursdays).

She used to voice and front the flagship programme for digital station Q which was partnered with the magazine, hosting live sessions, interviewing guests and curating specialist playlists for Q NOW — a new-music programme which aired every Friday afternoon. In 2012 Perry presented and produced a Muse special for the station, which was then chosen to be included in the first-ever edition of Q Magazine on the iPad.

It was announced on 28 May 2015 that Perry would front a new show on Absolute Radio on weekdays between 4pm and 6pm. The show started in July 2015. She now presents weeknights 7pm to 10pm and Sundays 8pm-12am. Perry also presents a weekday 1pm to 4pm show on Absolute Radio 90s.

From 24 April 2023, Perry replaced Deb Grant and commenced presenting a show from 10am to 2pm on Jazz FM. From 6 January 2024 she also replaced Angellica Bell as presenter of the Saturday morning show on Scala Radio, broadcasting from 10am to 1pm.

Perry is a part of the judging panel at the AIM Awards and contributes to the BBC Sound of Poll each year.

== Independent presenting ==
During 2012, Perry also fronted a programme for Folded Wing and the British Council called The Selector.

"...Selector is such an important platform for British music...it showcases the wide and diverse sound of the UK around the world."

Perry also fronted an independent production for Q Radio, a Bjork special and an AIM Awards 2012 programme. She produces and presents every show herself.

== Musician career ==
Perry is also a musician and often plays with a band at various venues around the UK, including the Isle of Wight Festival, Camden Crawl, The Great Escape Festival, and Lovebox, among others. She plays a 1966 Fender Rhodes and a Korg SV1-88 as well as harmonium and piano. In 2014, she went on tour with Jim Jones Revue, and has opened up for Band of Skulls, Drenge, and Wet Nuns, among others.

== Miss Perry Presents ==
Miss Perry Presents is a live music night that Perry programmes and produces.

"With radio being so playlisted these days, I felt it important to use my lucky position within the industry to promote and support music I felt really strongly about."

These nights are held in Birmingham, at various venues. From The Hare and Hounds, Kings Heath, to The Institute, she has been honoured to host the likes of Anna Calvi, Savages, Dry The River, Band of Skulls, First Aid Kit, Pulled Apart By Horses, We Are Augustines, and Dan Sartain.

== Personal life ==
Perry lives in Brighton with her husband and daughter.
