= Smash Hits Radio =

United Kingdom
- Frequency: Freeview: 712

Programming
- Format: Contemporary hit radio

Ownership
- Owner: Bauer Radio
- Sister stations: The Hits Radio; Q Radio; Kiss; Heat Radio; Magic; Absolute Radio; Kerrang! Radio; Planet Rock

History
- First air date: 2002
- Last air date: 2013

Links
- Webcast: radioplayer.smashhits.net
- Website: smashhits.net

Smash Hits Radio was a UK-based digital radio station owned and operated by Bauer Radio based in Manchester. It was available throughout the UK on Freeview channel 712. The format was based on the now defunct Smash Hits Magazine. It was a Contemporary hit radio format. The station opened in 2002 and continued to play a 'non-stop' music format without presenters or DJs, with only one minute of adverts every half an hour. The station formed part of the Bauer Passion Portfolio. The longest-serving DJ was presenter Natalie Brown, who had been involved from 10 April 2003 until the final day on air.

In 2007 and 2008, Smash Hits Radio was removed from DAB radio in several areas during the introduction of Traffic Radio.

In May 2009 Smash Hits Radio was removed from Virgin Media and Sky, along with The Hits Radio, Heat Radio, Q Radio and Kerrang Radio.

It remained available through Freeview until 5 August 2013, when it was replaced by KissFresh, at the same time the station ceased broadcasting online.
