= Pete Allison =

British journalist (born 1991)

- Born: 12 April 1991 (age 34); Redditch, England
- Occupations: Broadcast journalist, presenter

Pete Allison is a broadcast journalist and presenter, currently at Newsbeat on BBC Radio 1, BBC Radio 1Xtra and BBC Asian Network.

== Early career ==
Allison joined Nottingham Trent University's student radio station, Fly FM, in 2009 and was nominated for Best Newcomer at the 2010 Student Radio Awards. He was shortlisted in The Hits Radio's Stars of 2011 talent search and later joined the station. Later that year, he was twice nominated at the 2011 Student Radio Awards. He went on to win Gold for Best Male Presenter and Bronze for Best Entertainment Programme. He then joined Q Radio's weekend schedule and began covering weekend overnights across the Bauer network on stations including Key 103, Radio City and Hallam FM.

== Capital ==
At the end of 2011, Allison made his debut on Capital Birmingham. Soon after, he joined Capital Yorkshire to host weekend breakfast. He also appeared on Capital Manchester.

== BBC Radio 1 ==
As a result of winning Best Male Presenter, he had the opportunity to cover early breakfast on BBC Radio 1 in June 2012. After nine months at Capital Yorkshire, he joined Radio 1 to deputise on early breakfast in March 2013. He became the regular cover presenter for the slot.

== Absolute Radio ==
In November 2013, Allison joined Absolute Radio to present weekend overnights, before moving to weekday overnights and Saturday evenings. He was also heard on Absolute Radio 90s and Absolute Radio 00s. In recognition of his work at Absolute Radio and Radio 1, he was named in The ReelWorld Radio Academy 30 Under 30.

== Return to Capital ==
In October 2014, Allison joined Capital Yorkshire to present Drivetime. In 2018, he completed five half-marathons in five days between Yorkshire stadiums raising almost £11,000 for Global's Make Some Noise. He left in April 2019.

== BBC Radio Leeds ==
In June 2019, Allison joined BBC Radio Leeds presenting shows across the schedule.

== BBC Newsbeat ==
In October 2022, he joined Newsbeat as a journalist on Radio 1, Radio 1Xtra and Asian Network.
