= Heat Radio =

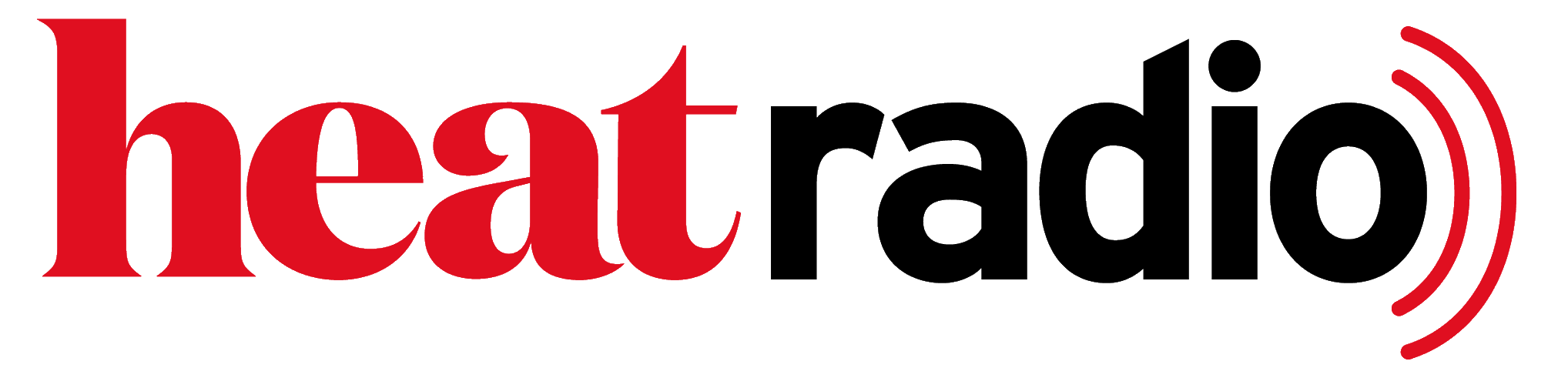
- London; United Kingdom
- Broadcast area: United Kingdom
- Frequencies: DAB+: 11A (SDL National); 11B (Inverness and Tayside); 11C (Glasgow); 12D (Edinburgh); Online

Programming
- Format: Hot AC

Ownership
- Owner: Bauer Media Audio UK
- Sister stations: Absolute Radio; Greatest Hits Radio; Hits Radio; Jazz FM; Kerrang! Radio; Kiss; Magic; Planet Rock

History
- First air date: 30 September 2003

Links
- Webcast: Rayo
- Website: Heat Radio

Heat Radio is a British digital radio station, owned and operated by Bauer Media Audio UK. It originally launched in 2003, related to the Heat magazine. Heat Radio currently broadcasts on DAB+ and Rayo nationwide.

As of December 2024, the station has a weekly audience of 614,000 listeners according to RAJAR.

== History ==
Heat Radio launched on 30 September 2003 as a non-stop music station broadcasting from London, where it was located alongside the sister magazine. In 2007, the station re-launched with presenters and showbiz news throughout the day.

In 2009, Heat moved to Bauer Radio's studios in Castlefield, Manchester, as part of a cost-cutting programme, to be based alongside sister radio stations Key 103 and The Hits Radio, where music and entertainment news output would be sourced. That same year, the station, along with The Hits Radio, Smash Hits Radio, Q Radio and Kerrang Radio, were removed from Sky, Virgin Media and UPC Ireland, due to cost-cutting measures with Bauer Radio, BSkyB and Liberty Global.

In January 2015, heat moved back to London be based with Bauer's other national brands at One Golden Square.

In early 2016, the station, along with Kisstory, migrated from being provided on local DAB multiplexes to instead being transmitted over the Sound Digital national multiplex, in which Bauer is a shareholder. Some of the local capacity previously used by Heat and Kisstory was reallocated to KissFresh.

The station has been appearing in Heat magazine, with regular adverts, shared content and joint campaigns like a recent promotion with Channel 4's Hollyoaks, and ITV2's The Only Way Is Essex.

In its early years, Heat generally broadcast at 64 kbit/s in mono on DAB. Following the 2007 relaunch, the service was boosted to 112 kbit/s in stereo where possible (in London, Smash Hits Radio moved to the former Heat capacity to allow the prior SH slot to be used as part of the extended Heat). More recently, the Heat service switched back to mono, generally at 80 kbit/s, and this bitrate carried over when heat migrated to SDL National.

On 1 February 2019, Heat Radio became an online only non-stop music station as it was removed from the Sound Digital national multiplex but remained on Freeview until June 2020 when it was replaced by Greatest Hits Radio. On 27 July 2020, it returned to be broadcast via DAB via local radio in Inverness.

On 3 April 2023, following the conversion of Clyde 2, Forth 2 and Tay 2 to the Greatest Hits Radio brand, Heat Radio was added to the local DAB multiplexes for Glasgow, Edinburgh and Dundee/Perth in place of the previously provided Greatest Hits Radio UK.

On 26 September 2023, it was announced that Heat would return over Autumn 2023 to SDL nationally on DAB+ with seven other stations. Eleven months later, as part of a wider reshuffle of Bauer's digital capacity, which included the launch of Greatest Hits Radio 60s and Kisstory R&B on SDL, Heat was moved to broadcast as a DAB+ station solely in London.

== See also ==
- Heat (magazine)
- Heat (TV channel)
