= Melody 105.4 FM =

Former radio station in London

Melody Radio/Melody FM

England
- Broadcast area: London
- Frequency: 104.9/105.4 MHz

Programming
- Format: Easy Listening

Ownership
- Owner: Hanson plc (1990–1998); Emap plc (1998)

History
- First air date: 9 July 1990
- Last air date: December 1998

Melody Radio was an Independent Local Radio station, broadcast to Greater London between 1990 and 1998, when it was purchased by media group Emap and rebranded as Magic 105.4.

== History ==
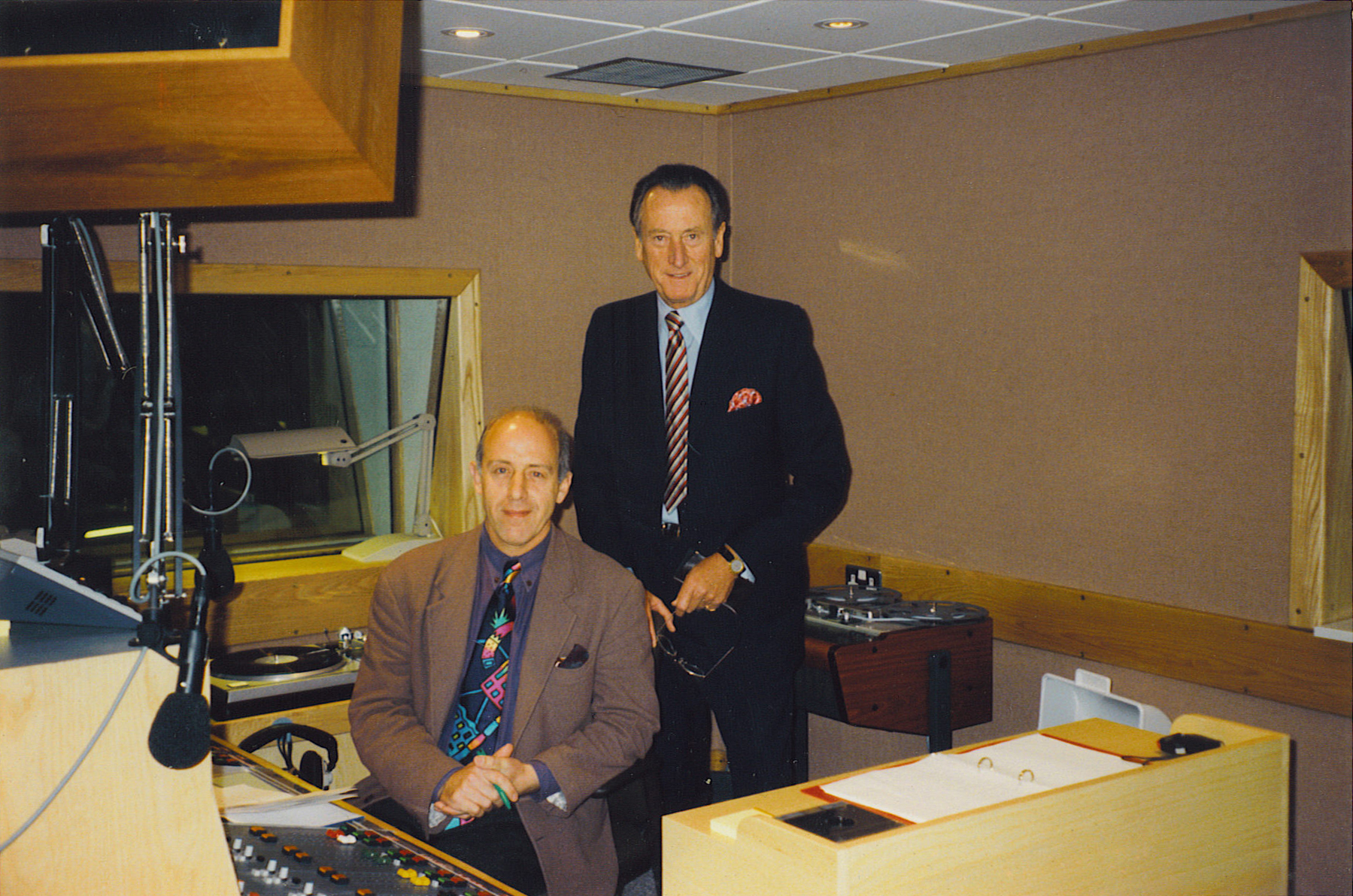
Breakfast presenter Bill Bingham (seated) with Melody Radio owner Lord Hanson on launch day

Melody Radio launched on 9 July 1990 on 104.9 FM in Greater London with Tony Bennett's Strike Up The Band, as part of the Independent Broadcasting Authority's creation of seven capital-wide services at the time. Broadcasting from studios in Knightsbridge, the station was owned by Lord Hanson, chairman of Hanson plc, who created Melody as a service he himself would wish to listen to, allegedly inspired by 'easy listening' formats that had become popular on the West Coast of the United States. Hanson was particularly keen on keeping speech to an absolute minimum; however, after the first few days of transmission, a large number of listener enquiries as to the identity of featured music persuaded him to slightly relax restrictions on presenter content.

In its early years, the music predominantly catered for those aged 50 and over; Frank Sinatra, who recorded a launch message for the station, and Annunzio Mantovani prime examples of the artists featured. Launch presenters included Bill Bingham, Steve Crozier, Dave Gillbee, Greg Bance and Peter Dickson, who spent four years as breakfast show presenter. The station achieved listening figures of over a million within its first six months of transmission. Other presenters included Gary Whitford, Allan King, for a brief period David Jacobs, Tony Myatt and Jonathan Izard.

In 1996, the station changed frequencies, moving to 105.4 FM, having received numerous complaints from listeners in South West London of interference from BBC Southern Counties Radio. The 104.9 frequency was, after technical corrections, reallocated to Xfm.

In its later years, Melody FM adopted a soft adult contemporary sound, aimed at a slightly younger audience, and newly marketed as 'London's relaxation station', the slogan which accompanied a television advertising campaign featuring Enya's Orinoco Flow. The Radio Authority permitted the sale of Melody FM to Emap in June 1998, who rebranded the station as Magic 105.4 in December that year, as part of the company's newly created network of soft adult contemporary music stations, following the acquisition of several AM services in the north of England.

== Other ==
Melody Radio launched with the slogan 'At last – radio without the speakers'.

One of Melody Radio's distinctive features was its lack of pre-produced station identification. Presenters also acted as the station's newsreaders, and the inclusion of regular financial bulletins was precipitated by Hanson's own interest in business affairs.

Long-running programmes included a nightly Saga-sponsored Classic Hour and Melody Showtime, a tribute to songs from musical theatre, later replaced by Nice And Easy, which featured many of the artists that had formed Melody's core playlist in 1990.

Later Melody FM presenters including David Hamilton, Tony Myatt and David Allan all joined Saga's network of radio stations following the Emap takeover.
