= Kisstory =

UK radio station

Coordinates: 51.51598°N 0.13844°W

- London; United Kingdom
- Frequencies: DAB+: 11D (UK); 12A (Scotland)

Programming
- Format: Rhythmic Hot AC
- Network: Kiss Network

Ownership
- Owner: Bauer Media Audio UK
- Sister stations: Kiss; Kiss Xtra; Absolute Radio; Greatest Hits Radio; Heat Radio; Hits Radio; Jazz FM; Kerrang! Radio; Magic; Planet Rock

History
- First air date: 7 May 2013

Links
- Webcast: Rayo
- Website: KISSTORY

Kisstory is a British digital radio station owned and operated by Bauer Media Audio UK as part of the Kiss Network. Playing "old skool and anthems", it is a sister station to Kiss.

As of February 2026, the station has a weekly audience of 1.715 million listeners, according to RAJAR.

== History ==
Kisstory is also a radio programme on Kiss that first aired and was presented by Streetboy on 28 Jan 2002. On 7 May 2013 Kisstory was expanded into a full-time station in response to positive feedback from listeners and at the expense of Q Radio. At the same time Kiss Fresh, a then brand-new station playing "non-stop new beats including Hip-Hop, R&B, EDM, House and Garage", was given its own station.

== DAB availability ==
Initially, Kisstory was available over Freeview and online, but was unavailable via DAB radio receivers. In 2014, Bauer announced plans to roll out the Kisstory station over DAB digital radio to London and other areas.

Kisstory began DAB rollout in London on 12 December 2014 with the addition of the service (and sister station KissFresh) to the Greater London I multiplex.

The DAB service of Kisstory was rolled out to more areas of the country at the start of 2015, replacing Absolute Radio 60s in some areas (including Bauer's owned digital multiplexes in northern England) and added in new space on others; this formed part of a wider reshuffle of Bauer's digital offering, which also included the withdrawal of Kerrang! Radio from areas outside London, and the launch of Magic 105.4 FM as a national station over Digital One. Following the expanded rollout, the Kisstory station was available in areas including London, Birmingham, Cambridge, Dundee and Perth, Edinburgh, Glasgow, Humberside, Central Lancashire, Leeds, Liverpool, Kent, Northern Ireland, Nottingham, South Yorkshire, Stoke-on-Trent, Sussex, Swansea, Teesside and Tyne and Wear.

From 29 February 2016 the Kisstory station was made available in DAB more-widely across the UK with the launch of the second national commercial DAB multiplex, Sound Digital. Some of the local-level DAB slots vacated by Kisstory were taken over by sister station Kiss Fresh, principally in those areas where Bauer operated or co-operated the local DAB ensemble.

On 11 February 2019, Kisstory migrated from SDL to the more-widely available Digital One multiplex, taking up the space vacated by Absolute Radio 90s moving in the other direction a week prior.

== Technical ==
Kisstory broadcasts nationally via DAB on the 11D Digital One multiplex. It also broadcasts in Scotland on channel 12A.

== Programming ==
Kisstory programming is produced and broadcast from Bauer's London headquarters at The Lantern.

== Norway ==
In February 2016, Kisstory was launched in Norway. This variant (which does not have any presenters or DJs) is managed by local teams and is broadcast alongside KISS on DAB+ at 48kbit/s.

== KISSTORY R&B ==
On 7 August 2024, Bauer Media Group UK announced the creation of a sister station to KISSTORY. KISSTORY R&B launched on Monday 16 September 2024. The station will take listeners on "a deeper dive into the defining R&B cuts of the Old Skool & Anthems genre playing songs from Usher, Destiny’s Child, Craig David and Mary J Blige and more."

As of March 2026, the station is hosted by Kiss presenters Esi and Ace, who present their own respective shows, and Kisstory presenter DJ Matchstick, who presents his own in-the-mix show every Saturday. KISSTORY R&B is available on Bauer's radio streaming app, Rayo, and their website.

== Logo history ==
The station's logo from its launch date until April 2026
