= Fran Godfrey =

British newsreader

Frances Helen Godfrey is a radio presenter and former BBC Radio 2 newsreader, known for her appearances on Wake Up to Wogan, a long-running breakfast show in the United Kingdom. Godfrey began contributing to Wake Up to Wogan in 1993 and made her final appearance on the show on 9 May 2008.

== Early life ==
Born in Hampstead, London, Godfrey left England at the age of two to live in Southern Rhodesia (now Zimbabwe), returning four years later with her parents and two brothers to live for a short time near Oxford, before moving to Highcliffe in Dorset. She was educated at the Convent of the Cross, and the Polytechnic of Central London.

== Career ==
After university, Godfrey worked in secretarial roles for several years in London and Bournemouth.

In 1980 she approached the independent local radio station in Bournemouth – 2CR – and accepted a job as a Technical Operator. Godfrey then became Assistant to the Commercial Producer, which involved creative writing and producing. In 1984, Godfrey began presenting, and in time presented every type of programme on the station.

She joined the BBC network in September 1990, but rose to prominence becoming part of the team for Wake Up to Wogan in 1993. Godfrey was associated with the programme for many years as one of several newsreaders who would appear on a rotation basis; her contemporaries in this respect being Alan Dedicoat and John Marsh. She moved from presenting the early morning news in the late 2000s, but continued to present bulletins for Radio 2 until she left the station in 2014.

In September 2012 it was announced that Godfrey would take voluntary redundancy along with her colleague, Fenella Fudge at the end of the year. Her decision came about as the BBC made budget cuts as part of its Delivering Quality First initiative. As part of the programme the broadcaster would reduce the number of its continuity announcers and merge the news teams for separate networks, but returned to the BBC after her voluntary redundancy leave.

In March 2016 Godfrey joined new Bauer Radio digital station Mellow Magic as its breakfast show presenter and remained presenter until she left on 28 February 2025. She will stay at the station hosting a Sunday afternoon show from 9 March.

On 2 June 2025 Godfrey began broadcasting a lunchtime show on Boom Light from Mondays to Thursdays. This coincided with the launch of Boom Light on DAB+ in various UK cities. From 9 June she also joined Magic Classical to present an evening show from Sundays to Thursdays.

During her time with Wake up to Wogan Godfrey received many emails on air, including poetry which often began "I've fallen in love with Fran Godfrey", and tales of her "Cupboard under the stairs"; once again quoting Sir Terry Wogan:

Fran's lavish penthouse has been the scene of many an unsavoury tale: honest artisans imprisoned for weeks in the cupboard under her stairs, lured there on the pretext of urgent plumbing, grouting, or rendering...

Godfrey is a past President of Hospital Radio Bedside, a radio station that broadcasts to hospitals in Bournemouth, Poole, Christchurch and Wimborne, UK.

== Personal life ==
Godfrey is a practising Roman Catholic, and attended St James's, Spanish Place in London's Marylebone for many years, where she worked in the church's office as an assistant to the then rector, Monsignor Frederick Miles, typing out the Missal and Lectionary in large print when his eyesight began to fail as a result of macular degeneration. In 2020, she spoke to the Catholic Herald about her friendship with Miles, who she first met upon moving to London and knew for 22 years, describing him as "an extraordinary priest, and the best friend anyone could ever have". Her birthday is 29 June.
