= Kerrang! Radio =

British digital radio station

Coordinates: 52.482325°N 1.905423°W

- London; United Kingdom
- Broadcast area: United Kingdom
- Frequencies: DAB: 11A (SDL National); 11B (Bradford and Huddersfield); DAB: 11B (Tayside); DAB: 12D (Stoke and Stafford)

Programming
- Format: Rock music
- Network: Kerrang! Network

Ownership
- Owner: Bauer Media Audio UK
- Sister stations: Absolute Radio Classic Rock; Kerrang! Radio Unleashed; Klassic Kerrang! Radio; Planet Rock

History
- First air date: 2002 (digital); 10 June 2004 (FM)
- Last air date: 14 June 2013 (FM)
- Former names: Kerrang! 105.2 (2004–2013)
- Former frequencies: 87.7 MHz; 105.2 MHz

Links
- Webcast: Rayo
- Website: Kerrang! Radio

Kerrang! Radio is a British specialist rock music radio station related to Kerrang! magazine, broadcast nationally on DAB and online. Launched in 2002, it is owned and operated by Bauer Media and forms part of the Kerrang! Network, which also includes the heavy metal-focused Kerrang! Rock Unleashed and classic rock-focused Klassic Kerrang! Radio.

As of March 2025, the station has a weekly audience of 445,000 listeners according to RAJAR.

== History ==
=== Initial launch: 2002/2003 ===
Launched as a digital station on Freeview in 2002, expanded to London from 2003. It was also known as Kerrang! 105.2 FM in the West Midlands from 2004 to 2013 when its studios in Lionel Street, Birmingham, 105.2 was turned over to Planet Rock (which was then replaced by Absolute Radio from 2015) in June 2013. It was London only until May 2018 to make way for Hits Radio.

In July 2002, ahead of the Radio Authority's advertisement for a new regional FM franchise for the West Midlands, Kerrang! magazine launched an FM radio station in Birmingham on a short-term restricted service licence at a frequency of 87.7 FM. The station was broadcast from the grounds of Birmingham City Football Club and was initially on air for one month only.

Kerrang! Radio as a permanent service first launched in late 2002 as a largely automated rock music service delivered over the Freeview platform, as one of a suite of stations its parent company (then Emap) added to the then-new Freeview TV system, the others including fellow digital jukebox stations Smash Hits Radio, Q Radio and Heat Radio, and relays of London stations Kiss 100 and Magic 105.4 FM. This new Kerrang! Radio was also streamed online, and served as a sibling to Kerrang! TV which launched around the same time: these stations being connected with the Kerrang! print magazine in name, ownership and style.

This digital 'jukebox' version of Kerrang! was subsequently rolled out to DAB digital radio, beginning with transmission in London from 1 November 2003. The DAB service was extended to other areas from 2004, joining Emap-owned multiplexes in northern England (largely replacing The Hits Radio) and also made available on the regional multiplexes for the West Midlands and central Scotland.

=== FM radio station: 2004–2013 ===
Kerrang! Radio first went on air in June 2004, following Kerrang!'s successful bid for the West Midlands regional FM franchise the previous October. The station was based at new dedicated studios located in Lionel Street, Birmingham, officially opened by Black Sabbath's guitarist Tony Iommi. Broadcasting on the new 105.2 FM Midlands frequency, Kerrang! Radio replaced the prior digital Kerrang! Radio on DAB, TV platforms and online. The new station's format mixed modern and classic rock with speech content targeted at a young adult rock audience. In the FM era the station ran a somewhat more mainstream, adult-rock tone of daytime output than the magazine, featuring more indie and alternative rock than the magazine, which traditionally focused on heavier rock genres. The night shows were conversely very much fuelled by the traditional Kerrang! Magazine sound, with a wider and less mainstream style, playing a mix of punk and metal bands.

In October 2007, as part of a major overhaul of Kerrang! Radio's program schedule and line-up of hosts, former Big Brother UK contestant Kate Lawler was taken on as co-presenter of the "Morning After" breakfast show, alongside Tim Shaw. Another new appointment at this time was Nick Margerrison, who became one of the regular presenters of the "Night Before" late night show.

By 2009, the station had changed the style of music it played in order to appeal to a wider audience, and radio industry listening figures published in March of that year revealed that the station was broadcasting to 374,000 people across the West Midlands. Kerrang! Radio won a Gold Award in the Station of the Year category at the 2009 Sony Radio Academy Awards.

==== Rock Dog ====
March 2013 saw Kerrang! partner with Guide Dogs charity to have a black Labrador canine, dubbed Rock Dog host a radio show on Sundays. The radio programmer at the time reported "People seem to be having trouble believing us, but it really is a dog. Like, an actual dog. It's a programme for people who love rock music. And dogs". Clips of the show are archived on the internet. Rock Dog continued through May 2013, after which changes in the station eliminated the show.

=== Return to digital-only platforms ===
On 23 May 2013, Bauer Media announced that the output of older-skewing DAB rock station Planet Rock (which they had acquired three months earlier) would become available on FM in the West Midlands, taking over Kerrang! Radio's 105.2 FM broadcast frequency. Kerrang! Radio transmitted its final FM broadcast just three weeks later, on 14 June, and the station's studios in Birmingham city centre were permanently closed. A reduced Kerrang! service would continue, with some of the same DJs, as a young-focused rock service through the local DAB platform, digital TV and online, but all programming on both stations would come from Bauer's London premises. The digital footprint of Kerrang! was largely unchanged, though this was not universal and omitted some areas of the UK. In August 2013, the closure of the regional MXR digital radio multiplex for the West Midlands saw Kerrang! among several stations rolled down to the Birmingham-area local multiplex, meaning that the station disappeared from DAB in some parts of the region.

On 12 December 2014, carriage of Kerrang! Radio on DAB outside London ceased, with the station turning over almost all its transmission areas to Absolute Radio 90s; this was in preparation for the removal of Absolute 90s from Digital One in favour of Magic 105.4 FM in January 2015. Kerrang! remained available in London by moving to the slot previously home to Absolute Radio 00s. Kerrang! continues to broadcast nationally via Freeview and online platforms as before. The reduction in Kerrang!'s DAB footprint saw the station become unavailable to radio listeners in Birmingham, in the former FM licence area.

Following the departure of breakfast presenter Kate Lawler to Virgin Radio UK in early 2016, a schedule reshuffle promoted Jake Thomson to breakfast, with his prior daytime show taken over by former In:Demand host Alex James.

In July 2017, Sophie Kostrowski joined the station to host the weekday breakfast show, as the replacement for Jake Thomson who moved to the weekend breakfast show on classic-dance music station Kisstory.

In December 2017, the UK's biggest club night Propaganda began broadcasting their own radio show on Kerrang! every Saturday night from 7pm to 10pm, presented by resident DJ Gabby Sanderson.

On 23 May 2018, the London DAB transmission of Kerrang! Radio ceased with the station removed, along with Absolute Radio 70s, to make way for Bauer's new contemporary hit radio station Hits Radio. Kerrang! continues to broadcast nationally over Freeview and online and on the Dundee DAB area.

On 23 March 2021, Kerrang! returned to Stoke & Stafford and Bradford & Huddersfield DAB.

In September 2023, it was announced that Kerrang! Radio would be made available on Sound Digital as a DAB+ station from October, making it available nationally via over-the-air radio for the first time. This was followed in March 2024 by the announcement that Kerrang!, along with most other Bauer-owned stations, would be withdrawn from the Freeview TV service as of 2 April (Absolute Radio remaining on the platform until May), ending Kerrang! Radio's transmission on television guides after a run of over 21 years.

== Subsidiary stations ==
=== Klassic Kerrang! Radio ===
This online only station was launched in August 2019, and focuses on classic rock music from the last 20 years.

=== Kerrang! Radio Unleashed ===
This online only station was launched in August 2019, and focuses on heavy metal music.

== Kerrang! Radio Premium ==
Kerrang! Radio was among the initial suite of Bauer stations to launch a premium paid subscription online audio platform in spring 2021; the previously free Kerrang! Radio Unleashed and Klassic Kerrang! Radio joined the paid-for lineup in 2022.
