= Bauer Media Audio UK =

UK-based radio division of the Bauer Media Group

- Formerly: Emap Radio; Bauer Radio
- Type: Subsidiary
- Industry: Media
- Founded: 2008
- Headquarters: Peterborough, England
- Area served: United Kingdom
- Key people: Simon Myciunka (CEO)
- Brands: Absolute Radio; Greatest Hits Radio; Jazz FM; Hits Radio; KISS; Planet Rock; Magic; Kerrang! Radio; Heat Radio
- Owner: Bauer Media Group UK
- Parent: Bauer Media Group
- Website: www.bauermedia.co.uk

Bauer Media Audio UK is a UK-based radio division of Bauer Media Group owning brands; Absolute Radio, Greatest Hits Radio, Jazz FM, Hits Radio, KISS, Planet Rock, Magic, Kerrang! Radio and Heat Radio.

== History ==
In early 2008, German magazine publisher Bauer bought the radio division of British company Emap, which had been established as East Midland Allied Press in 1947. Consequently, Emap Radio Limited was renamed to Bauer Radio Limited.

Emap's assets included national stations Kiss, Kerrang! and Magic, and local stations under the Big City Network brand in England, Scotland and Northern Ireland. These included 22 local FM stations in Scotland which Emap had bought from Scottish Radio Holdings in 2005.

In April 2011, Bauer Radio announced it would be restructuring its radio portfolio into two divisions. Stations linked to geographic areas would come under the Bauer Place brand, while national stations such as Kiss, Kerrang and The Hits would come under Bauer Passion. The Big City Network identity was dropped as part of the restructuring.

In April 2013, Bauer announced it would merge its two North East England stations, Metro Radio and TFM. The stations broadcast shared programming from Newcastle and Manchester while carrying separate branding, news bulletins and advertising.

In September 2014, Bauer announced it would be restructuring its radio portfolio as from January 2015. Magic AM in England was dropped in favour of the stations reverting to their heritage station names. The stations then formed part of the new 'City 2' network serving both Scotland and Northern England. A 'City 3' network on DAB, replacing The Hits Radio in most areas, launched on 19 January 2015. As part of this restructuring, the Place and Passion network banners introduced in 2011 were replaced by the Bauer City and Bauer National divisions. The 'City 3' network was withdrawn in favour of reverting to the networked The Hits service from September 2017.

At the beginning of March 2016, Bauer moved two of its stations, Planet Rock and Absolute 80s, from Digital One onto the Sound Digital multiplex, reducing the availability of these stations (areas including East Anglia, the South West, parts of Kent, Cumbria, and large areas of Wales and Scotland had no Sound Digital network transmitters). The issue was reported in local media in some areas. Planet Rock and Absolute 80s on D1 began broadcasting just a retune message loop from 18 April, and the switch-off occurred on 30 April.

On 6 May 2016, Bauer announced it had bought Midlands radio group Orion Media for an undisclosed amount, reportedly between £40 and £50 million. It was subsequently confirmed that Orion's stations Free Radio (West Midlands) and Gem (East Midlands) would become part of the Bauer City portfolio, with Gem introducing a version of the City sonic logo device to its presentation from August 2016.

On 16 August 2018, Bauer announced that it had bought Jazz FM for an undisclosed sum.

In February and March 2019, Bauer purchased Lincs FM Group, Celador and the local stations owned by Wireless Group, and the following month Bauer purchased the ten FM stations owned by UKRD, together with UKRD's 50% share in First Radio Sales Limited. In August of that year, the Competition and Markets Authority (CMA) began an investigation into these purchases, which found that a substantial lessening of competition had occurred in the marketplace for advertising. The CMA considered enforcing a partial divestment by Bauer, but in March 2020 instead made a 'behavioural remedy' ruling which accepted Bauer's proposal to pass a certain amount of advertising business to competing stations for a period of ten years.

== Radio brands ==
=== Networks ===
==== Absolute ====
This comprises seven decade-themed services and dedicated classic-rock and country stations. The network is aimed at 35- to 54-year-olds.

- Absolute Radio
- Absolute Radio 70s
- Absolute Radio 80s
- Absolute Radio 90s
- Absolute Radio 00s
- Absolute Radio 10s
- Absolute Radio Classic Rock
- Absolute Radio Country

The brand, combined with other Bauer brands, has additional stations available online with a single premium subscription:

- Absolute Radio 50s
- Absolute Radio 60s
- Absolute Radio 20s
- Absolute Radio Acoustic
- Absolute Radio Calm
- Absolute Radio Chilled
- Absolute Radio Classic Country
- Absolute Radio Forgotten 80s
- Absolute Radio Movies
- Absolute Radio Rock'N'Roll Football 24/7
- Absolute Radio Women of Country
- Absolute Radio Women of Rock
- Absolute Radio Workout
- Andy Bush's Indie Disco 24/7
- Haven't Heard It For Ages
- Through The Decades

Seasonal:

- Absolute Radio Halloween
- Absolute Radio Christmas Party
- Absolute Radio Summer

Former:

- Absolute Radio Sisters

==== Hits Radio Brand ====
- Greatest Hits Radio, a Classic hits radio network of 44 radio stations, available on local FM and DAB, with a national DAB station.
- Greatest Hits Radio 60s
- Greatest Hits Radio 70s
- Greatest Hits Radio 80s
- Hits Radio, a Contemporary hit radio network of 25 radio stations, available on local FM and DAB, with a national DAB station. Until April 2024, most stations operated as their heritage radio brands, such as Radio City or Free Radio, with a mix of local and networked programming, but from April 2024 only the Scottish stations such as Clyde 1 have retained their heritage names.
- Hits Radio Pride, launched in 2020, playing music for the LGBTQ+ community.
- Hits Radio Chilled, (formerly Magic Chilled)
- Hits Radio 90s
- Hits Radio 00s

The brand, combined with other Bauer brands, has additional stations available online with a single premium subscription:

- Good Times Anthems
- Greatest Hits Grooves
- Greatest Hits of the 90s
- Greatest Hits Radio Love
- Greatest Hits Radio's Top 500
- Simon Mayo's Album Tracks

Seasonal:

- Greatest Hits Radio Christmas

Pop-Up:

- Hits Radio Live

Former:

- Ken Bruce's Secret 60s
- Rewinds Greatest 80s Hits

==== Jazz FM ====
- Jazz FM, DAB service available nationally playing jazz, blues and soul, based from London, acquired by Bauer in 2018.

From 7 May 2021, the brand, combined with other Bauer brands, has additional stations available online with a single premium subscription:

Current:

- Dinner Jazz
- Jazz FM Presents Soul
- Jazz FM Presents The Blues
- Jazz FM's Greatest
- Jazz Funk Party
- Love Supreme
- Players Lounge
- Relax with Jazz
- Robbie Vincent's Music Garden Party (originally called Rhythm - The Beat Goes On)

Seasonal:

- Jazz FM Christmas

Former:

- Clare Teal's Big Band and Swing
- After Hours
- Avant Garde
- Best Live Jazz Performances
- Big Band and Swing'
- Big Easy
- Carnival
- Crossroads
- Headliners
- Jazz DNA
- Move On Up - Funk and Soul
- New Heat
- Piano Jazz
- Smooth and Soulful Jazz
- Summertime
- Vocal Expression

==== Kerrang! ====
A network similar to Absolute, dedicated to rock music.

From 7 May 2021, the brand, combined with other Bauer brands, has additional stations available online with a single premium subscription:

Current:

- Alt Rock 00s
- Alt Rock 10s
- Alt Rock 80s
- Alt Rock 90s
- Alt Rock Workday
- Doomed!
- Download 20 Bands
- Everything Emo
- Full Metal Racket
- Kerrang Radio Gaming
- Kerrang! Radio Unleashed
- Klassic Kerrang! Radio
- Nu Metal
- Pop Punk Anthems
- Skate Rock
- The Moshpit

Former:

- Alt New Rock
- Alt Rock Anthems
- Alt Rock Party
- Alt Rock Workout
- Fresh Blood
- Goth Rock Party
- Grunge Garden
- Non Stop Headliners
- Pop Punk Ruuules!
- PWR Up Live
- Rebel Rebel
- US Rocks

==== KISS ====
The KISS network is aimed at a young 15-34 audience and predominantly plays contemporary pop music during the day with late-night specialist content on weekends.

- KISS; Available on London 1 DAB in the Greater London area and on the Digital One DAB multiplex across the UK.
- DAB stations:
  - Kisstory; DAB station, playing "old-skool" urban and dance, aimed at a more mature 25-50 age range.
  - Kiss Xtra; DAB station, dedicated to black music and culture (namely hip-hop and afrobeats).

From 7 May 2021, KISS, alongside various other Bauer brands, was given several subscription-only internet audio streams:

Current:

- Kiss Afrobeats
- Kiss Bliss, station playing slow paced and acoustic music relating to the Kiss brand.
- Kiss Dance, playing the latest dance music.
- Kiss Garage, dedicated to the UK garage scene.
- Kiss Drum and Bass
- Kiss Ibiza 30
- Kiss in the Mix
- Kiss R&B
- Kisstory 00's
- Kisstory 80's
- Kisstory 90's
- Kisstory Hip Hop
- Kisstory R&B
- Kisstory Slow Jams
- Kisstory Trance
- Kiss Workout

Seasonal:

- Kiss Super Summer Anthems
- Kissmas Office Party

Former:

- Kiss Running Trax
- Kiss Ibiza

==== Magic ====
- Magic, melodic adult-contemporary music service aimed at 25 to 54 year olds, available on DAB nationally and on FM in London and Bristol.
- Magic Mellow (also known as Mellow Magic), melodic classic hits and love songs.
- Magic Soul, a mix of soul, funk, Motown and R&B music.
- Magic Musicals, DAB+ station playing show tunes.
- Magic Classical, (formerly Scala Radio)
- Magic 100% Christmas, a format flip for the main Magic station from late November to Boxing Day, playing Christmas music.

The brand, combined with other Bauer brands, has additional stations available online with a single premium subscription:

Current:

- In The Park - Classical
- Magic at the Movies
- Magic Boybands
- Magic Girl Power
- Magic Power Ballads
- Magic Slow Dance
- Magic Soul Floor Fillers
- Mindfulness Music
- Movie Blockbusters
- Peaceful Piano
- The Jukebox
- The Study Space

Seasonal:

- Eurosong Radio (Pop-up for Eurovision)
- Christmas Crackers (September - December)
- Christmas Carols (November - December)
- Christmas Crooners (November - December)
- Magic Classical Christmas (November - December)

==== Planet Rock ====
- Planet Rock, DAB radio station, which plays primarily classic rock music.

From 7 May 2021, the brand, combined with other Bauer brands, has additional stations available online with a single premium subscription:.

Current:

- 20 Years of Download
- Acoustic Amps Off
- Bloodstock Radio (18+)
- Blues Power
- Chilled Rock
- Classic 70s Rock
- Classic 80s Rock
- Classic 90s Rock
- Greatest Guitar Solos
- Hair Metal Heroes
- In Concert
- Joe Elliott - This Is How I Roll
- Planet Rockstock 10
- Power Anthems
- Rock Ballads
- Stateside
- The Prog Lab
- UK Rocks
- Workday Rocks

Seasonal:

- Summer Rocks

Former:

- Americana
- Classic 00s Rock
- Classic 10s Rock
- Driving Songs
- Main Stage Live
- New Rock
- Party Rock
- Rock Your Workout (temporarily renamed Bloodstock Radio during the 2021 Bloodstock Open Air)
- The Blues Bar

=== Stand alone ===
==== National/ part-national ====
- Heat Radio, contemporary pop, co-branded with Bauer's Heat magazine. Online and Local DAB.

==== Local ====
- Downtown Radio, Hot AC station on DAB in Belfast and FM/DAB in the rest of Northern Ireland, part of Hits Radio for advertising purposes.
- Downtown Country, dedicated digital country music station on DAB in Northern Ireland.
- Cool FM, CHR station on FM in Belfast and DAB across Northern Ireland, part of Hits Radio for advertising purposes.
- Cool Old Skool, dedicated digital retro dance music-only station on DAB in Northern Ireland.

=== Former ===
- Mojo Radio, classic rock, early pop, blues and soul; broadcast on digital TV and online; ceased broadcasting in 2008.
- Q Radio, rock, alternative rock; broadcast nationally on Freeview and online; closed on 7 May 2013; replaced by Kisstory.
- Radio City Talk, a talk format station which provided rock and sport to Merseyside and the North West. It closed in May 2020 due to no longer having financial viability. It was a sister station to Radio City and Greatest Hits Radio Liverpool & The North West.
- Smash Hits Radio, contemporary pop hits; following its removal from DAB it continued over Freeview, until being withdrawn to release a slot for Kiss Fresh.
- 3C, country music station, based in Glasgow, acquired as part of SRH takeover, broadcast on DAB in various areas and Freeview nationally; closed 2007; replaced on Freeview by a relay of Clyde 1 for a time.
- Radio Plymouth, local station based in Plymouth. Acquired by Bauer in 2020, and merged into Greatest Hits Radio.
- Wave 105, based in Hampshire, acquired as part of SRH takeover. Covered part of the south coast and neighbouring counties; played the latest hits. Merged into Greatest Hits Radio South in 2024.
- Scala Radio, classical music national station broadcast digitally (Sound Digital and online) from 4 March 2019. Relaunched as Magic Classical on 16 September 2024.

== DAB multiplexes ==
Bauer is a partner in one of the UK's national commercial multiplexes, operates twelve wholly owned local DAB multiplexes, and jointly owns a further three with Global Radio; the firm was also formerly a minority partner (of Wireless Group) for local services in three further areas. Bauer operates the following DAB multiplexes:

=== Sound Digital ===
Bauer has a 30% holding in Sound Digital, operator of the second national commercial DAB multiplex to launch in the UK; this began transmissions in spring 2016 and several Bauer stations broadcast on it, some transferred from other multiplexes. The other partners are Wireless Group (30%) and Arqiva (40%).

=== Bauer Digital Radio ===
Bauer's wholly owned digital multiplexes are primarily located in areas where the firm operates local FM stations; the original group of Bauer (formerly Emap) DAB multiplexes are located in the following areas:

- Central Lancashire – Bauer Central Lancashire
- Humberside – Bauer Humberside
- Leeds – Bauer Leeds
- Liverpool – Bauer Liverpool
- North Cumbria - Bauer North Cumbria
- South Yorkshire – Bauer South Yorkshire
- Teesside – Bauer Teesside
- Tyne and Wear – Bauer Tyne & Wear

=== Score Digital ===
As part of Emap's takeover of Scottish Radio Holdings, the firm gained control of Score Digital, the DAB multiplex operator owned by SRH. Competition guidelines required the merged firm to divest of one of the multiplexes obtained in this deal, and so the Ayr multiplex formerly run by Score was sold on to Arqiva. The remaining Score multiplexes have since been relabelled as Bauer multiplexes.

The ex-Score DAB multiplexes are located in:

- Dundee – Score Dundee
- Edinburgh – Score Edinburgh
- Glasgow – Score Glasgow
- Inverness – Score Inverness
- Northern Ireland – Score Northern Ireland

=== Bauer DAB ===
The Wireless Group and Emap entered into a venture to run the following three DAB multiplexes. These multiplexes were initially branded as TWG-Emap multiplexes; following the sale of TWG to UTV (creating UTV Radio), the multiplexes were relabelled as UTV-Emap, and following the sale of Emap's radio assets to Bauer, the blocks were renamed again as UTV-Bauer. Bauer owned 30 per cent of the UTV-Bauer venture, but sold its stake in November 2013. Now wholly owned by Bauer Radio following the sale of the Wireless local stations in 2019.

- Stoke-on-Trent – Stoke & Stafford
- Swansea – Swansea SW Wales
- West Yorkshire – Bradford & Huddersfield

=== CE Digital ===
Bauer and Global Radio jointly own CE Digital Ltd, each holding 50% of the venture. The CE operation was established by Emap in partnership with the Capital Radio Group, which through mergers subsequently became part of GCap Media and later Global Radio. The 'CE' multiplexes take their name from the initials of Capital and Emap, and have not been renamed despite the identity changes of both operators.

CE Digital operate the following DAB multiplexes:

- Birmingham – CE Birmingham
- London – CE London (also known as Greater London I)
- Manchester – CE Manchester

== Radio City 2 balloons ==
In 2008 Radio City 2 started annually releasing hundreds of balloons (with messages attached) from the roof of the Radio City Tower "in memory of loved ones that we miss at Christmas time." This practice continued on an annual basis until December 2016. It ended because the helium-filled balloons caused widespread litter and were dangerous for animals to eat. On 22 December 2016, Radio City 2 and presenter Pete Price were contacted by numerous scuba divers and members of the public urging them to cancel the planned mass balloon release at midnight on 22 December. The balloon release went ahead. Two diving journalists contacted Radio City 2's owner, Bauer Media Group, asking for the practice to be stopped. Bauer Media confirmed that no company within the Group would conduct a balloon release in the future. An exception to this was made by Key 103 on 24 May 2017, two days after the Manchester Arena bombing, in memory of the 22 victims.

== Rayo ==
In March 2023, Bauer announced that all its radio stations and audio content across Europe would be available in one place, named Rayo. Rayo offers an app and a website, replacing its existing radio station apps and the Planet Radio website. In August 2023, the Amazon Alexa "skill" for listening to the radio stations offered through Planet Radio was changed to instead play through Rayo.
