= 2023 in British radio =

This is a list of events taking place in 2023 relating to radio in the United Kingdom.

== Events ==
=== January ===
- 1 January –
  - BBC Radio 2 dedicates five hours of New Year's Day programming to Take That, including a two-hour countdown of their top hits.
  - Damian Lewis presents a two hour programme, A Blues and Swing Special, on Jazz FM.
  - Charlie Higson returns to Scala Radio for a second series of Charlie Higson and Friends.
- 2 January –
  - Former Blue Peter presenter Lindsey Russell takes over as presenter of the weekday Early Breakfast show at Heart.
  - Adil Ray presents a one-off show for Jazz FM on New Year Bank Holiday Monday.
  - The Community Media Association undergoes a rebrand for its 40th anniversary.
- 3 January –
  - CassKidd joins BBC Radio 1Xtra to present a Tuesday evening show previously hosted by Jamz Supernova.
  - Sonny Jay begins presenting the weekday late night show on Capital.
  - Former Jack FM presenter Trevor Marshall joins Get Radio Oxfordshire to present weekday drivetime.
  - The Radio Today website reports that during V2 Radio's six-week toy appeal leading up to Christmas 2022, listeners donated more than 2,400 toys for local charities and organisations in West Sussex.
- 4 January –
  - Bauer Radio confirms all of Absolute Radio's mediumwave transmitters will be switched off by the end of January, making it exclusively a digital station. The switch-off is expected to take place on 23 January.
  - The Asian Network Takeover returns for a new series, with a new presenter each month.
- 5 January – Figures released by BBC Sounds show there were 57.7 million listens to its content between 20 December and 2 January.
- 6 January –
  - Ofcom begins awarding the fourth tranche of its small-scale DAB licences, beginning with those for Glenrothes and Kirkcaldy, Ludlow, and Newport and Chepstow.
  - Shaun Keaveny begins a four-week presenting stint on The Radio 2 Rock Show, standing in for regular presenter Johnnie Walker.
  - Radio News Hub have been acquired by Markettiers4DC, a broadcasting PR agency.
- 7 January –
  - Former Capital presenter Rob Howard begins presenting weekend Early Breakfast at Heart.
  - Trevor Marshall and Rich Smith begin presenting weekend breakfast for Get Radio Oxfordshire.
- 8 January – Andrew Marr joins Classic FM to present a Sunday morning programme in which he selects some of his favourite pieces of classical music alongside newer releases.
- 9 January –
  - Phil Williams and OJ Borg confirm Williams is taking over Borg's Sunday night into Monday morning show on Radio 2, with Borg continuing to present four nights a week.
  - Five folk songs about modern folk heroes by artists such as Chris Difford and Thea Gilmore have been created as part of Radio 2's 21st Century Folk project.
  - BBC Asian Network confirms that Nikita Kanda will be its new regular breakfast show presenter, Kanda having presented the programme for the past six months.
  - Ricky Wilson of Kaiser Chiefs joins Virgin Radio to present the weekday drivetime show.
  - Sam Thompson begins presenting Hits Radio's weekday evening show, Hits UK.
  - Hits Radio presenter Jordon Lee takes over weekday early breakfast on Kiss, but continues with his breakfast show on Hits Radio Pride and afternoons on Heat radio.
  - Gaydio becomes available on DAB in a further seven UK cities – Glasgow, Edinburgh, Cardiff, Birmingham, Bristol, Leeds and Sheffield.
  - Rock FM is found to be in breach of Ofcom regulations following the broadcast of a pre-recorded voice note from a listener on the 19 October 2022 edition of its breakfast show in which the word "cunt" was heard at the end of the recording. The piece had not been vetted before broadcast.
- 10 January –
  - It is confirmed that Bob Shennan, the former Controller of BBC Radio 2, BBC Radio 5 Live, BBC 6 Music and the BBC Asian Network is to leave the broadcaster after 36 years.
  - Lauren Mahon and Steve Bland, presenters of the podcast You, Me and the Big C, have said they are ready to step down from their roles, but hope that the podcast will continue without them.
  - Victoria Quinn leaves Q Radio to become breakfast show presenter at Downtown Country.
- 11 January –
  - Bauer Media Audio UK have appointed Lucie Cave to the newly created role of Chief Creative Officer for Podcasts and Commercial Content.
  - Ofcom is reported to be considering a request by community station Cross Counties Radio for it to be allowed to change the number of hours of original content it must provide from 161 hours per week to 70.
  - Sports journalist Martin Samuel joins Talksport as a contributor to the breakfast show, and to co-present a weekly programme on Thursday evenings.
- 13 January –
  - Sam Jackson is appointed as Controller of BBC Radio 3, effective from April 2023.
  - Ofcom revokes the small-scale DAB licence it awarded to Like DAB Limited for the Scilly Isles after Like DAB said it would not be able to launch the service by the deadline given to it by Ofcom.
  - BBC Sports broadcaster Jennie Gow announces she has suffered a stroke, affecting her speech.
- 14 January – Emperor Rosko joins Radio Caroline to present a series of monthly breakfast shows.
- 17 January – Ken Bruce announces on his Radio 2 show that he will be leaving the network at the end of March. Shortly afterwards, Greatest Hits Radio confirms he will join in April, replacing Mark Goodier on their mid-morning show, and taking the PopMaster quiz with him.
- 18 January –
  - Following feedback, the BBC have made some changes to their proposals for BBC Local Radio, including those relating to the networking of shows and the pairing of stations. But plans to cut the number of local BBC Introducing programmes from 32 to 11 are met with concern from musicians and those from the music industry who fear it could a negative effect on new acts trying to break through on to the scene.
  - Regency Radio have hired Tommy Boyd to present a show on Sunday nights, with a start date to be confirmed.
  - Fun Kids launches a subscription service titled Fun Kids Podcast+.
- 19 January – Members of the National Union of Journalists are to hold a consultative ballot on whether to strike over the proposed changes announced for BBC Local Radio.
- 20 January –
  - At midnight Absolute Radio stops broadcasting on MW. Consequently, Absolute Radio is now a digital-only station.
  - Jack FM teams up with comedian Dom Joly for the last gig of his nationwide tour by sponsoring a show at Oxford's New Theatre.
  - Dance station Juice FM, launched in December 2022, announces plans to join DAB in North Wales and West Cheshire.
- 23 January –
  - Used car marketplace company cinch takes over as sponsor of The Chris Evans Breakfast Show on Virgin Radio, succeeding Sky as the programme's sponsors with a three year sponsorship deal.
  - Former GB News reporter and presenter Rosie Wright joins Times Radio to present Weekday Early Breakfast.
  - Shaun Tilley joins Liverpool Live to present the drivetime show from 4.00pm.
  - The Radio Today website reports that Josh Tate may have become the UK's youngest newsreader after joining Radio Exe at the age of 16.
  - Steve McGoldrick has been appointed as the new Head of Marketing at Radiocentre.
- 24 January –
  - Bristol's Ujima Radio submits a request to Ofcom to change its Key Commitments by broadcasting less non-English output.
  - Ofcom have found Leicester-based Radio2Funky and Takeover Radio, as well as Cumbernauld FM, in breach of their commitments after receiving complaints they were not producing enough original output.
  - BFBS launches its second series of BFBS Esports Live, presented by OJ Borg.
- 25 January –
  - City University of London announces the launch of the UK's first MA degree in podcasting, along with a Centre of Podcasting Excellence, with the first students scheduled to begin their studies in September 2023.
  - Smooth Radio undergoes a "brand refresh", with a new logo and strapline. "Your relaxing music mix" is replaced by "Always the best music".
  - Made in Manchester announces a partnership with Workerbee to generate new content ideas for radio and television.
  - 45 Radio announces that it has hired former Radio 1 presenter Bruno Brookes to present Bruno's Mega Hits on Saturdays and Sundays from midday.
  - Josh Tate, believed to be the UK's youngest newsreader, appears on Matt Chorley's show on Times Radio, where he is invited to read the midday headlines.
- 27 January –
  - BBC Arabic radio service closes down.
  - Ofcom initiates proceedings to revoke Bauer Radio's mediumwave licence following its decision to close the national AM feed of Absolute Radio, and consequently ending its licence eight years ahead of schedule. Ofcom also considers financial penalties against Bauer after it confirmed the decision the previous day.
  - Frisk Radio have hired David Alley, a former presenter on Heart Bedford and Chiltern FM, to present their weekday drivetime show.
- 30 January –
  - BBC Radio 2 begins its 2023 Radio 2 Piano Room feature, which runs until 24 February, and sees different artists performing with the BBC Concert Orchestra at the Maida Vale Studios. The performances are broadcast live on Ken Bruce's mid-morning show.
  - The Radio Academy holds its inaugural "Last Mondays" event in Central London, a monthly gathering for members of the audio industry featuring guest speakers.
  - Listeners to Greatest Hits Radio have voted "Mr. Blue Sky" the top Feel Good Anthem following a poll of songs that make listeners feel good.
  - Technology company Aiir announce the launch of Aiir Scheduler, a cloud-based music scheduler for radio stations to create and manage playlists via a web browser.
- 31 January – Members of the National Union of Journalists have voted to take industrial action over planned changes to BBC Local Radio.
- January – Signal 1's Stafford and Congleton transmitters switch to broadcasting Greatest Hits Radio, with Signal 1 continuing to broadcast to Stoke-on-Trent.

=== February ===
- 1 February –
  - BBC Radio Bristol presenter Laura Rawlings is appointed as presenter of The Radio Academy Podcast for the next six months, covering for regular presenter Roisin Hastie while she is on maternity leave.
  - Dee Ford, Managing Director of Bauer Media Audio UK, announces plans to leave the role after 35 years with the company.
- 2 February – BBC Radio WM announces that its new building in Digbeth, Birmingham, will be known as "The Tea Factory". It will also be home to BBC Radio 1's Newsbeat, Radio 4's The Archers and BBC Asian Network News.
- 3 February –
  - The BBC confirms the latest plans to merge its BBC Music Introducing shows, with 20 shows spread across 39 BBC Local Radio stations, airing twice a week, and some shows merging with those of neighbouring stations.
  - Former Secretary of State for Culture Nadine Dorries begins presenting a weekly Friday evening show, Friday Night with Nadine, for Talkradio and TalkTV. Her first guest is the former Prime Minister Boris Johnson.
  - It is reported that Pierre Petrou has resigns as London Greek Radio's chief programming and content manager.
  - The BBC confirms it has hired Erewash Sound Drive presenter Lewis Allsopp as a studio director for Radio 4 and the World Service at Broadcasting House.
- 5 February – Radio 2 airs Happy Birthday Tony Blackburn: 80 Poptastic Years to celebrate Tony Blackburn's 80th birthday on 29 January.
- 6 February –
  - Bauer Radio launches an ad-free subscription services for Magic Radio and Greatest Hits Radio, enabling listeners to hear additional stations without commercials, and skip live content.
  - Iain Lee announces he is leaving Jack FM, and that he is retiring from broadcasting.
- 7 February –
  - Lucy Frazer replaces Michelle Donelan as Culture Secretary following a cabinet reshuffle.
  - Nielsen has reported a weekly audience of 211,000 tradespeople for Fix Radio.
- 8 February – Ofcom awards a further five small-scale DAB licences in Inverclyde, Newry, Northampton, Southampton and Wolverhampton.
- 9 February –
  - Perminder Khatkar and Victoria Easton-Riley are announced as having been elected to the Radio Academy Board of Trustees.
  - Bauer announces the launch of its digital audio advertising network, audioXi, in Portugal.
- 10 February – Rick Houghton joins Chesterfield F.C.'s online station, 1866 Sport, to present the weekday drivetime show.
- 11 February –
  - Emma Scott, formerly of Heart and Kerrang!, joins North Derbyshire Radio to present a weekend lunchtime show.
  - Radio Today reports that Radio Essentials has launched on DAB in Sheffield, having been on air online since October 2022.
- 13 February –
  - Owain Wyn Evans begins presenting the Radio 2 Early Breakfast Show from Cardiff.
  - A report published by Radiocentre indicates that commercial radio in the UK received a collective advertising revenue of £740m during 2022, an increase from £718.7m in 2021.
  - Radio News Hub becomes an official partner with the Radio Academy.
  - The Disasters Emergency Committee launches a radio appeal following the 2023 Turkey–Syria earthquake voiced by Michael Palin.
  - Great British Radio extends its coverage to Edinburgh and Cardiff after launching on DAB+ in those cities.
- 14 February –
  - Ofcom revokes the mediumwave licence from Absolute Radio following Bauer's decision to cease broadcasting on its AM frequency.
  - Capital London presenter Ant Payne apologises for comments he made on his drivetime show the previous day after suggesting it was the appropriate time to book a cheap flight to Turkey.
- 15 February – Magic Breakfast launches an interactive holiday promotion with its sponsor, On the Beach.
- 17 February –
  - The LGBTQ-themed radio station, Gaydio, broadcast a minute's silence at 11.00am in collaboration with other UK LGBTQ stations to remember 16-year-old Brianna Ghey, who was stabbed to death on 11 February. The silence is preceded by a feature introduced by transgender presenter Stephanie Hirst in which she reflects on the discrimination and violence often experienced by trans people, as well as paying tribute to Ghey.
  - Ofcom launches a consultation process after Talksport submits a request to turn off four of its 22 AM transmitters, reducing its mediumwave output from 93% to 89.9% of the population.
  - Kerrang! Radio fan Hope Lynes has been given her own show on the station, airing every Saturday from 2pm.
  - Local Radio Support enters into its first agency partnership, with Manning Gottlieb OMD.
- 19 February – She Scores, a series focusing on female composers, returns to Scala Radio for a third series.
- 20 February –
  - Ofcom finds Bauer in breach of its regulations over its 2022 Make Me a Winner competition after a promotion on Kiss failed to mention all of the terms and conditions, notably that entrants to the competition on a particular day would still be valid for the rest of the time it was running. The Make Me a Winner competition took place between April and July 2022.
  - Creed III actor, producer and director Michael B. Jordan teams up with KISS and the Rio Ferdinand Foundation for their #notboxed campaign, which is designed to help inspire young people.
- 21 February – BBC Radio 1Xtra announces that weekday afternoon presenter Reece Parkinson is to leave the network as part of a schedule shake-up. Saturday afternoon presenter Lady Leshurr is also being replaced.
- 24 February –
  - Radio 2 confirms Vernon Kay will present the mid-morning show, taking over in May. Gary Davies will present the show on a temporary basis after Ken Bruce leaves in March.
  - Steve Allen announces he has left LBC after 44 years in broadcasting.
  - Carolyn Quinn, presenter of Radio 4's Westminster Hour and PM programmes, announces she is leaving the BBC after 36 years with the broadcaster. She has also presented her final regular edition of PM.
  - Dasha Zakarets, a Ukrainian refugee who came to England at the start of the war, reads the opening minutes of the 8am bulletin on Greatest Hits Radio York and North Yorkshire to mark the first anniversary of the Russian invasion of Ukraine.
- 26 February –
  - Edward Adoo presents his final Sunday night show on BBC Three Counties Radio after seven and a half years, having decided a few weeks earlier to leave the station ahead of planned schedule changes.
  - Radio Today reports that Ofcom's Community Radio Fund has made 17 awards to local community stations.
- 27 February –
  - Lomond Radio celebrates the 10th birthday of its youngest presenter, Ruairidh Mac, who presents Lomond Radio Kids Edition each Monday evening.
  - Alton Andrews, a presenter on the original Red Rose Radio, is to join the newly-launched digital Red Rose Radio to present a Saturday morning show.
- 28 February –
  - Members of the National Union of Journalists working for the BBC regional service in England vote to take strike action over planned cuts to BBC Local Radio. A 24-hour strike is scheduled for 15 March to coincide with Budget Day.
  - Nation Broadcasting sells its share in Bailiwick Broadcasting, operator of the DAB multiplex covering the Channel Islands, to Tindle CI Broadcasting.

=== March ===
- 1 March –
  - Nation Broadcasting launches Nation New on DAB in Tynemouth and South Shield, a radio station playing nothing but new music by new artists.
  - Bauer announces plans to replace Kiss with Greatest Hits Radio on its FM frequencies in Cambridge, Peterborough and Suffolk, subject to Ofcom approval.
- 2 March –
  - Kenny Allstar is announced as the new presenter of the Radio 1 Rap Show, replacing Tiffany Calver, who is leaving the programme after four years.
  - Small-scale DAB licenses are awarded to Higher Rhythm Limited in Doncaster, PlymDab in Plymouth, and Mid Yorkshire DAB Limited in Wakefield.
  - Tindle Media Group acquires a 10% stake in Podcast Radio in order to help with its international expansion plans.
- 3 March – Ken Bruce presents his final mid-morning show on Radio 2 having been on the station since 1985 and on the slot since 1998.
- 4 March –
  - Former BBC Radio 5 Live presenter Sam Walker, and Pete Price, previously of Radio City, join Happy Radio to present shows. Walker presents a weekend lunchtime show, while Price presents Guilty Pleasures on Saturday evenings.
  - Student radio stations in the south of England get together for a 24-hour broadcast in aid of FareShare, the Journey of a Lifetime Trust, Mind, Stonewall, the Teenage Cancer Trust and UNICEF UK. The broadcast raises £600 for the charities.
  - Andrew Collins presents his final edition of Saturday Night at the Movies for Classic FM, having announced the previous day his intention to leave after seven years.
- 5 March – Nominations for BBC Local Radio's Make a Difference Awards close, with over 11,000 nominations later confirmed as having been received.
- 6 March –
  - Gary Davies temporarily takes over the BBC Radio 2 mid-morning show. He also launches a replacement for the PopMaster quiz called Ten to the Top.
  - RB1 Radio is rebranded as Rotherham Radio.
  - Ofcom finds 15 community radio stations breached their broadcasting conditions in February 2023, with issues ranging from studio output to not meeting their key commitments.
- 7 March – Radio News Hub announces it will make a free two-hour live programme available providing budget coverage on Budget Day (15 March). The programme will include coverage of the budget speech, as well as analysis from a panel of experts.
- 8 March –
  - Pierre Petrou, the former Head of Programming at London Greek Radio, is appointed as Operations Manager for Radio Maria England.
  - Ceri Hurford-Jones, the former Managing Director of Spire FM, joins Salisbury Radio as their Creative Adventures Manager.
- 9 March –
  - Mae Muller is chosen to represent the UK at the 2023 Eurovision Song Contest with her song "I Wrote a Song". The announcement is made on The Radio 2 Breakfast Show by presenter Zoe Ball.
  - Presenter Pat Sharp is reported to have left Greatest Hits Radio "with immediate effect" after making an inappropriate remark about a woman's breasts while compering an awards event.
  - Virgin Radio 80s Plus announces the launch of a Saturday night guest slot presented by a star from the 1980s, beginning with Clare Grogan, who will present the slot for four weeks. She is followed by Matt Goss in April and Carol Decker in May.
  - The National Union of Journalists announces plans to hold a strike ballot among staff at BBC Radio Foyle following a management decision to implement schedule changes, which include replacing the two hour morning programme with a 30 minute version.
- 11 March –
  - 5 Live Sport and Fighting Talk are pulled from the day's schedule on BBC Radio 5 Live after presenters Mark Chapman and Dion Dublin (5 Live Sport) and Colin Murray (Fighting Talk) join other sports BBC sports presenters in refusing to appear on air after the BBC took Gary Lineker off Match of the Day over controversial comments he made about the UK government's Illegal Migration Bill.
  - Emil Franchi begins presenting weekend early breakfast on Absolute Radio.
  - Jonathan Ross succeeds Andrew Collins as presenter of Classic FM's Saturday Night at the Movies.
- 12 March – At 8am, Radio Winchcombe becomes available in the Bishops Cleeve area on 106.9FM.
- 13 March –
  - Mark Chapman returns to Radio 5 Live for Monday Night Club after the Gary Lineker controversy is resolved. The BBC will initiate an independent review into social media guidance for its presenters.
  - Matt Richardson succeeds Iain Lee as presenter of Jack FM breakfast.
  - Emil Franchi begins presenting weekday afternoons on Absolute Radio 00s.
- 15 March –
  - At 11am, members of the National Union of Journalists begin a 24-hour strike on BBC Local Radio, requiring a syndicated programme to air in some areas.
  - Tynemouth-based station Frisk Radio announces plans to join DAB in Middlesbrough and Redcar.
  - BBC Radio 1Xtra announces schedule changes to come into effect from June, including a show presented by Tiffany Calver on Friday nights.
- 16 March –
  - Ofcom gives Bristol-based Ujima Radio permission to change its key commitments to its audience, changing the station to one serving African and Caribbean listeners in the city's St Paul's area.
  - Heart 00s announces that Rachel Stevens is joining the station on a temporary basis as a stand-in presenter, covering Ashley Roberts' Saturday afternoon show while Roberts is on holiday.
  - Nation Broadcasting have signed Phil Hoyles of Greatest Hits Radio to present Drive on Radio Pembrokeshire, Radio Carmarthenshire and Bridge FM Radio.
- 17 March – The nominations for the 12 categories in the 2023 Global Awards are announced.
- 20 March –
  - Bauer launches a regional Greatest Hits Radio service for Cambridge, Peterborough and Suffolk on DAB ahead of proposed changes to its FM frequencies in the area.
  - Community station Heartland FM announces it is scaling back its operation because of falling revenue and increased operating costs.
  - Former KL.FM 96.7 presenter Kelvin Scott joines KL1 Radio in Norfolk to present the breakfast show.
- 21 March –
  - BBC Radio 5 Live have hired Gordon Smart to present a weekly news and current affairs programme on Sunday evenings from Glasgow.
  - At 8pm, Times Radio airs a leadership debate from Edinburgh and featuring the three candidates in the Scottish National Party leadership election.
- 22 March –
  - Paul O'Grady announces that he is to join Boom Radio to present a weekly show.
  - David Prever announces he is leaving his position as presenter of the breakfast show on BBC Radio Oxford to take up the role of Head of Programming at Radio News Hub.
- 23 March – Ofcom sets out the conditions of the new BBC Operating Licence, which comes into effect from 1 April. In a letter to Clare Sumner, Director of Policy at the BBC, Ofcom also expresses its concerns about upcoming changes to BBC Local Radio, in particular plans for programme sharing, which it feels will struggle to remain relevant to listeners.
- 24 March –
  - Online LGBTQ+ station GlitterBeam launches on DAB in Blackpool.
  - The annual BPG Awards are held in London, where the prestigious BPG Jury Prize is awarded to multiple winners, the first time this has happened. The prize is awarded to eight BBC Local Radio presenters for questioning Liz Truss during her time as prime minister, something the organisation's chair, Grant Tucker, describes as "game-changing for Liz Truss and her doomed government". The winners are Rima Ahmed of BBC Radio Leeds, James Hanson of BBC Radio Bristol, Graham Liver of BBC Radio Lancashire, Anna Cookson of BBC Radio Kent, John Acres of BBC Radio Stoke, Chris Goreham of BBC Radio Norfolk, Sarah Julian of BBC Radio Nottingham, and Amy Oakden of BBC Radio Tees.
- 24–25 March – The BBC Radio 6 Music Festival returns to Manchester for 2023, the venue of the very first event in 2014; Manchester will be the festival's permanent home.
- 25 March –
  - Rev. Richard Coles co-presents BBC Radio 4's Saturday Live for the last time after 12 years as a regular presenter, as a result of its production moving as from the following week from London to BBC Cymru Wales New Broadcasting House in Cardiff; the programme will also be reduced from 90 to 60 minutes.
  - The 2023 National Hospital Radio Awards are held in Bolton.
  - The UK Community Radio Network holds a regional networking event at the University of Northampton.
- 27 March –
  - Radio 2 announces a partnership with BBC Children's and Education to launch Let it Grow, a project inspired by the BBC One television series Wild Isles and that includes special programmes and playlists.
  - Radioplayer announces a deal with Renault Europe to develop the Radioplayer for Renault streaming app.
- 28 March – Paul Miller, who presents the BBC Local Radio Late Show in the south of England, confirms he plans to leave the BBC later in the year after 23 years with the broadcaster.
- 29 March – The UK government publishes a draft Media Bill that gives local commercial radio greater power over changing its music output and broadcasting content from outside its area. The bill also requires an increase in local news output.
- 31 March –
  - Members of the National Union of Journalists working for BBC Local Radio announce a second strike in protest at planned cuts to the service, to be staged on 4 May to coincide with the local elections.
  - The winners of the 2023 Global Awards are announced. Winners include the company's own podcast, The News Agents, which wins the award for Best Podcast.

=== April ===
- 2 April –
  - Bronwen Lewis, a former contestant on The Voice UK, joins BBC Radio Wales to present a weekly Sunday morning show.
  - Magic Radio broadcasts the 2023 Olivier Awards, which includes a live acceptance speech from Richard Hawley containing nine expletives. The station subsequently apologises for broadcasting the speech.
  - Local English language programming is broadcast on Greatest Hits Radio South Wales for the final time. Bauer management told the industry news website RadioToday that the separate content for South Wales was "no longer viable going forwards". The station retains its late-night Welsh-language programme, airing from Sunday to Thursday nights.
- 3 April –
  - Ken Bruce joins Greatest Hits Radio to present the mid-morning show from 10.00am to 1.00pm. PopMaster, the UK's most popular radio quiz, also moves to Greatest Hits Radio. To make way for Bruce's show, the morning edition of the Top Ten at 10 is moved to 9am and renamed the Top Ten Till Ken. The first track played on Bruce's new show is "Come Together" by The Beatles.
  - Bauer Radio rebrands Clyde 2, Forth 2, MFR 2, Northsound 2, Tay 2, West Sound in Ayrshire, and West Sound in Dumfries & Galloway, and Radio Borders as Greatest Hits Radio, bringing its Scottish stations under the Greatest Hits banner alongside those in England and Wales.
  - CFM and Radio Borders are rebranded as Greatest Hits Radio.
  - Bauer replaces Lincs FM with Greatest Hits Radio Lincolnshire on 102.2FM, 96.7FM and 97.6FM, while Lincs FM continues to air on DAB.
  - Schedule changes at BBC Radio 1Xtra see Keylee Golding take over as presenter of the weekday afternoon show and Remi Bungz presenting weekday drivetime. Golding's afternoon show is the first on the network to move outside London and is presented from Birmingham.
  - An edition of Radio 4's Front Row plays part of what is believed to be the earliest complete recording of a concert by The Beatles. The tape was recorded by a pupil at Stowe School on 4 April 1963.
- 4 April –
  - Ben Chapman is appointed CEO of BFBS, replacing Simon Bucks.
  - The charity MV Ross Revenge – Home of Radio Caroline launches a crowdfunding appeal to raise £125,000 for essential repairs to the MV Ross Revenge.
- 5 April – Nielsen reports that Fix Radio has a weekly audience of 295,109 who listen for an average of 22.9 hours.
- 6 April –
  - More4 have commissioned a six-part television version of PopMaster which will be presented by Ken Bruce.
  - Classic FM drivetime presenter John Brunning announces he is leaving the programme after ten years but will continue to present on the network.
  - LBC political editor Theo Usherwood announces he is stepping down from the role for personal reasons.
- 7 April –
  - Tim Smith presents the first of two Easter specials on Jazz FM; his second show airs on 10 April.
  - BBC Radio Wales broadcasts a tribute to presenter Nicola Heywood-Thomas, who died the previous day, as part of its Radio Wales Arts Show.
- 8 April –
  - Mark Goodier begins presenting weekend mid-mornings on Greatest Hits Radio, replacing Pat Sharp.
  - David Jensen returns to Jazz FM for a third series of David Jensen's Jazz.
- 9 April – As a tribute to Paul O'Grady, Boom Radio reruns the two-hour programme he presented for the station in December 2022, complete with festive elements. Prior to his death he had been scheduled to present an Easter special for Boom.
- 10 April –
  - Niall Horan presents a Make a Difference Awards special for BBC Local Radio.
  - Steve Wright presents Your Ultimate Queen Song on Radio 2, a countdown of listeners' favourite Queen tracks to celebrate the 50th anniversary of the release of their first album.
  - Podnews, a daily podcast newsletter run by James Cridland, has acquired Podcast Business Journal, also a daily podcast newsletter, from Streamline Publishing Inc.
  - Classic FM listeners have voted Sergei Rachmaninoff's "Piano Concerto No. 2" their favourite piece of classical music following a Top 300 countdown of pieces of classical music over the Easter holiday.
- 11 April – Geraint Lloyd joins MônFM Community Radio to present an evening show.
- 12 April –
  - The Isle of Man's Communications and Utilities Regulatory Authority grants Manx Radio a three year licence to test and trial DAB.
  - It is reported that DJ and radio presenter Tim Westwood has been questioned twice under police caution over alleged sex offences.
- 13 April –
  - BBC Radio Devon presenter David Fitzgerald is taken ill half an hour into his show. The show is then presented by Michael Chequer, with Fitzgerald off air while he recovers from a heart issue.
  - The Radio Today website reports on the launch of the talkSPORT Fan Network, whereby football podcasts will be brought under the umbrella of this title.
- 14 April – BBC Radio Devon presenter David Sheppard announces his intention to leave his late night show after 20 years following the BBC's decision to merge its local radio content.
- 15 April – Johnnie Walker sits in for Tony Blackburn on Sounds of the 60s after Blackburn is told to take a break by his doctor following the recurrence of a chest infection.
- 16 April – Paul Gambaccini presents Tony Blackburn's Golden Hour in Blackburn's absence.
- 17 April –
  - Schedule changes at Classic FM see Margherita Taylor replacing John Brunning as drivetime presenter, and Ritula Shah joining from Radio 4 to present Calm Classics on weekday nights from 10pm.
  - Times Radio partners with BFBS to air Jane Garvey and Fi Glover's weekday afternoon programme on BFBS Radio 2.
- 19 April –
  - Radio 2 confirms that Rylan Clark and Scott Mills will present its coverage of the 2023 Eurovision Song Contest.
  - Jazz FM is announced as the official media partner of Birmingham's Mostly Jazz Funk and Soul Festival 2023, which takes place from 7–9 July.
  - 10 Downing Street hosts a "Champions of local media" event featuring people from various UK radio stations.
- 20 April – Gfm, a community radio station in Glastonbury, Wells and Street, is awarded £106,367 of National Lottery Funding to upgrade studios and to develop outreach and training programmes.
- 21 April –
  - Tony Blackburn announces that he will be unable to present his radio shows for "a few weeks" as his chest infection requires further treatment. The news comes on the same day that it is announced Blackburn will be honoured at the 2023 Audio and Radio Industry Awards with the Pioneer Award.
  - Gaynor Martin, a music programmer for Global Radio, leaves the company after 25 years in the radio industry.
- 22 April – Author and journalist Clare Foges joins LBC to present a show on Saturdays from 4–7pm.
- 24 April –
  - Radio 2 listeners have voted "Space Man" by Sam Ryder their favourite Eurovision song. The countdown, presented by Steve Wright, is made available through BBC Sounds and will air on Radio 2 on 13 May.
  - Danielle Perry joins Jazz FM to present weekday mid mornings, replacing Deb Grant.
  - Former Sky News presenter Colin Brazier joins LBC to present weeknights from 10pm–1am.
  - Radio News Hub announces it will be providing free coverage of the Coronation of Charles III on 6 May, with Martin Kelner hired to present the coverage.
  - David Burns announces he is leaving BBC Radio Humberside after 12 years after being told he is no longer needed.
- 25 April – Members of the National Union of Journalists at BBC Radio Foyle announce they have "withdrawn confidence" in BBC Northern Ireland management over recent changes in the service.
- 26 April –
  - Figures released by PRS for Music show it collected £964m in 2022, an increase of 22.9% (£179.4m) compared to 2021.
  - BBC Radio 1 confirms plans to hold a programme of outreach activities focussed on mental health for young people across Dundee ahead of the Radio 1 Big Weekend in May.
  - Tyler West begins a 24-hour KISSTORY Rave for Cash for Kids to raise money for charity.
  - Yeovil station Radio Ninesprings has teamed up with Doctor James Main, a local songwriting dental surgeon, to record Our Charley, a song to mark the Coronation of Charles III. The song is performed by Doc Montgomery.
  - The Community Media Association announces it will campaign for community stations to be awarded longer licences after 80% of respondents to a community radio survey say longer 12-year licences would benefit the sector rather than the current five-year licence period.
- 27 April –
  - The BBC Local Radio strikes planned by members of the National Union of Journalists for 4 May are called off following talks between the NUJ and the BBC. NUJ members will now be balloted on a new pay offer.
  - BBC Radio Nottingham daytime presenter Mark Dennison announces he is leaving the BBC after 13 years.
- 28 April –
  - Heart listener Margaret Coetzer wins £1m in the live final of a competition run by Heart Breakfast presenters Amanda Holden and Jamie Theakston. The final is held at Global Radio's headquarters in London.
  - Caroline Martin announces plans to leave her syndicated late night show on BBC Local Radio, citing the uncertainty over planned changes to the network.

=== May ===
- 1 May –
  - Comedian Andrew Ryan joins Q Radio Breakfast to co-present with Declan Wilson and Amy McGuckin.
  - Lucy Thomas joins Bauer Media as their new Chief Financial and Operating Officer.
- 2 May –
  - The BBC World Service launches an emergency radio service for Sudan on the BBC News Arabic service; it is broadcast from London and will contain news and information for those trapped in the Sudan conflict.
  - Paul Quinn is named as BBC Radio Merseyside's alternative Scouse commentator for the Eurovision Song Contest.
  - Chris Ward is appointed Operational Director at Bauer Media Audio UK.
  - Den Siegertsz confirms he is leaving BBC Radio Stoke after 27 years.
  - At its annual meeting in Birmingham, Terry Lee is appointed as the new chair of the Community Media Association, succeeding Dom Chambers.
- 3 May – The final on-air conversation between Dame Deborah James and BBC radio presenter Tony Livesey is voted the favourite radio moment of the year at the annual Audio and Radio Industry Awards.
- 5 May –
  - Nation Broadcasting and Star Radio have raised objections to Bauer's plans to rebrand KISS to Greatest Hits Radio in the East of England, expressing concerns that doing so will narrow the range of radio services available in the area.
  - Nation Radio rebrands itself as CoroNation Radio for the duration of the coronation weekend.
- 8 May – Marie Lennon presents her final show on BBC Radio Wiltshire, having decided to leave the BBC because of the changes taking place in BBC Local Radio.
- 9 May –
  - Ofcom finds Lyca Media to be in breach of its obligations after it failed to broadcast any local news on Time 105.7 during the period in which the station's content was monitored by the regulator.
  - Lymm Radio is rebranded as Cheshire's MIX 56 to reflect the station's larger broadcast area along the A56 and M56 corridor.
  - Pure discontinues its Flow software.
  - Tony Blackburn confirms he will return to Radio 2 from Saturday 13 May.
- 11 May –
  - Jonathan Cowap presents his final programme for BBC Radio York after 34 years with the BBC, his departure prompted by planned changes in BBC Local Radio.
  - BBC Radio 2 presenter Scott Mills makes a cameo appearance in Channel 4's Hollyoaks.
  - BBC Chief Content Officer Charlotte Moore confirms a raft of new programmes for BBC Radio 4 and BBC Sounds, including a new podcast presented by Kirsty Young.
- 12 May –
  - Radio 2's Zoe Ball Breakfast Show is broadcast from Liverpool ahead of the Eurovision Song Contest, with 100 listeners invited to join Ball and her team.
  - Rylan Clark makes a guest appearance in a Eurovision special of The Archers in which he stops at the village of Ambridge to judge a Eurovision Variety Show.
- 13 May –
  - BBC Radio 2 airs Ultimate UK Eurovision Song, a countdown of UK entries in the Eurovision Song Contest, and presented by Steve Wright.
  - Hits Radio Pride briefly rebrands as Radio EuroPride for the Eurovision Song Contest.
- 14 May –
  - "Magic at the Musicals" returns to the Royal Albert Hall with Jason Manford and Ruthie Henshall presenting.
  - Mark Goodier presents a countdown of the top 20 most popular ABBA hits for Greatest Hits Radio.
- 15 May –
  - Vernon Kay joins Radio 2 as mid-morning presenter, replacing Ken Bruce. His first track is U2's "Beautiful Day".
  - Further departures are announced from BBC Local Radio. BBC Radio Lincolnshire afternoon presenter Melvyn Prior announces he is leaving the station after 32 years, while BBC Radio Gloucestershire daytime presenter Anna King announces her departure after 37 years at the BBC.
  - Boots have signed a sponsorship deal with Heart to sponsor Heart Breakfast until 2025.
  - Churnet Sound, launched online in 2021, begins broadcasting on DAB in Staffordshire.
- 17 May – BBC Radio Tees breakfast presenter Neil Green leaves the BBC after 21 years amid the changes happening to BBC Local Radio. The programme is presented by Amy Oakden the following day.
- 18 May –
  - RAJAR listening figures for the first quarter of 2023 are released. Among the highlights are Boom Radio, which has doubled its year-on-year audience to 635,000.
  - Global Radio have signed a deal with ITV to show highlights of the Capital Summertime Ball and Capital Jingle Bell Ball.
- 19 May –
  - Members of the National Union of Journalists at BBC Radio Foyle are scheduled to begin a 24-hour strike over planned changes to the service.
  - Fix Radio have signed a deal with TradePoint to sponsor the station's breakfast show, The Bold Builders Breakfast Show.
- 21 May – Sam Thompson succeeds Sarah-Jane Crawford as presenter of The Hits Chart on Hits Radio.
- 22 May –
  - Scala Radio launches a new schedule, which includes Penny Smith moving to mornings, and new shows from Ayanna Witter-Johnson and YolanDa Brown.
  - BBC Radio Gloucestershire breakfast show presenter Mark Cummings becomes the latest long-standing presenter to announce their departure from BBC Local Radio as a result of planned changes to the network.
  - Lyca Radio announces that its breakfast show will come live from Dubai and Abu Dhabi to coincide with the 2023 International Indian Film Academy Awards.
- 23 May – Ronnie Wood of The Rolling Stones joins the campaign to keep BBC Local Radio local.
- 24 May –
  - Virgin Radio confirms that Nick Grimshaw will cover the breakfast show for Chris Evans while Evans takes a break during the summer half-term week.
  - An audio feed of Sky News is added to the TuneIn service.
- 25 May –
  - Tim Wheeler presents his final show for BBC Radio Northampton after 14 years with the station.
  - Silk Radio celebrates its 25th anniversary by expanding its reach on DAB.
- 26 May –
  - The BBC secures exclusive UK audio rights to provide coverage of the 2023 Rugby World Cup, starting on 8 September.
  - Herdle White, the BBC's longest-serving Afro-Caribbean presenter, presents his final edition of The Reggae and Soca Show with Herdle White on BBC Radio Leicester, having decided to retire after more than 50 years on air.
  - Hits Radio's Hits Live returns to Liverpool's M&S Bank Arena. The event is presented by Fleur East and Sam Thompson, with performances from artists including Tom Grennan, Ella Henderson and Mae Muller.
- 26–28 May – Radio 1's Big Weekend 2023 takes place at Camperdown Park in Dundee.
- 28 May – Steve Barker presents his final programme for BBC Radio Lancashire after 45 years with the broadcaster; his alternative music show, On the Wire, has aired since September 1984.
- 29 May – Details of the switch-off of BBC Radio 4 Longwave are announced, with its programming moving to other BBC platforms, and the complete close of the service expected to occur during the second quarter of 2024.
- 30 May – Georgy Jamieson announces her departure from BBC Radio Suffolk after a decade with the broadcaster, with her final show scheduled to be at the end of July.
- 31 May – George Smith presents his final programme for BBC Radio York; he also announces his departure from BBC Radio Lincolnshire and BBC Introducing.

=== June ===
- 1 June –
  - Bauer Media is fined £25,000 by Ofcom for turning off Absolute Radio's mediumwave frequency.
  - Ofcom tells some DAB licence holders they will no longer need to provide extra services in order to have their licences renewed.
  - David Burns presents his final show on BBC Radio Humberside after 12 years of broadcasting.
- 5 June –
  - Schedule changes are made at BBC Radio 6 Music that see Gideon Coe and Marc Riley having their hours reduced to make way for new evening programming. Deb Grant also joins the network.
  - Coronation Street actress Brooke Vincent begins co-presenting the weekday evening show on Hits Radio, covering for Gemma Atkinson while she is on maternity leave.
- 6 June – A group of 26 MPs representing constituencies in Yorkshire write to the BBC Director-General, Tim Davie, to express their concerns about the proposed cuts to BBC Local Radio.
- 7 June –
  - Members of the National Union of Journalists at BBC Local Radio begin a 48-hour strike over proposed changes to the service. Journalists and musicians also stage a protest against the cuts, held outside Broadcasting House in London.
  - An Ofcom investigation into Middlesbrough-based Community Voice FM finds it failed to meet its speech obligations for the second time in under a year.
- 8 June –
  - BBC Radio Wales announces a refresh of its schedule from late June, including a new breakfast show presented by Dot Davies and James Williams.
  - At 10am, Ryan Millns begins a 24-hour broadcast of his breakfast show on Ashdown Radio in aid of St Wilfrid's Hospice in Eastbourne.
- 9 June –
  - BBC Radio 4 airs the 20,000th episode of The Archers.
  - Stuart Thomas, the BBC's Head of the Midlands, announces his departure form the BBC after more than 14 years.
  - Debut of The Tiffany Calver Show on BBC Radio 1Xtra, a two-hour show featuring party starter selections.
- 10 June – Kisstory hosts one of its summer outdoor day parties at Norwich's Earlham Park.
- 11 June – The 2023 Capital Summertime Ball is held at Wembley Stadium. The event includes a surprise appearance from Kylie Minogue.
- 13 June – BBC Radio Solent have hired Fred Dinenage to present a Saturday afternoon programme throughout the summer.
- 16 June –
  - Retrocadia Limited is fined £400 by Ofcom after its community station, Shoreline FM, failed to meet its Key Commitments.
  - Among those from the world of broadcasting to be recognised in the 2023 Birthday Honours is Ken Bruce, who becomes an MBE.
- 17 June – The second of Kisstory's summer outdoor day parties takes place in Bristol.
- 20 June –
  - Pat Sissons announces he is stepping down from his weekday mid-morning show on BBC Radio Solent; he will be succeeded by Lou Hammond from 10 July.
  - Sports presenter Roddy Forsyth announces his departure from BBC Radio 5 Live following a diagnosis of Parkinson's disease.
- 21 June – Adele Roberts announces her departure from Radio 1 after eight years, having already presented her final show in May. The departure of Gemma Bradley, presenter of BBC Radio 1 Introducing, is also announced. Sam & Danni are replacing Roberts, while Jess Iszatt is replacing Bradley.
- 25 June –
  - University Radio York switches off its AM frequency after 55 years on air, having made the decision to move to FM.
  - Catherine Bott presents her final Sunday show on Classic FM after 10 years with the network, and following her announcement two days earlier that she intended to take a break from presenting.
- 26 June – Aradhna Tayal Leach is appointed Managing Director of the Radio Academy, taking up the post with immediate effect.
- 27 June –
  - Professor Dame Elan Closs Stephens takes up the role of Acting Chair of the BBC following the departure of Richard Sharp.
  - Global Radio announce a deal with HSBC to make the bank the lead sponsor of its The News Agents podcast.
- 29 June –
  - Gareth Lewis, the drivetime presenter on BBC Radio Wales, is appointed Political Editor at BBC Cymru Wales.
  - Arqiva appoints Nicola Phillips as their Chief Legal Officer, replacing Katrina Dick.
- 30 June –
  - Global Radio switches off more of its AM frequencies for the Gold network, leaving the station as a digital only service apart from in London and Manchester. Smooth Radio's AM frequencies in Dorset, Essex, Gloucestershire, Norfolk, Suffolk, Wiltshire and Plymouth are also switched off.
  - British radio presenter Anita Anand meets Canadian Defence Minister Anita Anand during an edition of Radio 4's PM programme. The two discuss how they have often been mistaken for each other.

=== July ===
- 1 July – Simon Myciunka succeeds Dee Ford as CEO of Bauer Media Audio UK.
- 2 July – Former BBC News presenter Joanna Gosling joins Classic FM to present a Sunday afternoon show.
- 3 July –
  - BBC Radio 1 introduces a summer schedule that sees its flagship Radio 1 Breakfast with Greg James start and finish 30 minutes later, from 7.30am to 11.00am.
  - Sandgrounder Radio is rebranded as Dune Radio.
  - Cheryl Baker launches a weekday show on Great British Radio.
  - Ofcom rules that Inspiration FM failed to take care of the emotional welfare and dignity of those under the age of majority after a song containing an expletive was played during a Saturday morning children's programme. "Let Go" by Central Cee was played at 10.48am on 14 January 2023.
- 5 July –
  - Ofcom finds London Greek Radio in breach of its obligations on news broadcasting after it did not broadcast enough local news content during a week-long period in September 2022 when Ofcom was listening to the station following a listener complaint on the matter.
  - Bauer Media Audio UK appoints Richard Burnham as its Events Director.
  - Greatest Hits Radio has produced Back to the Start, an hour-long programme presented by Ken Bruce in which he looks at hospital radio. The programme is released to mark the 75th anniversary of the National Health Service, and is available free to hospital radio stations.
- 6 July –
  - Classic FM confirms it will switch from broadcasting on DAB to DAB+ in January 2024 in order to improve the sound quality of its output.
  - Jeremy Sallis confirms he is leaving BBC Radio Cambridge after 21 years, citing the upcoming changes to BBC Local Radio as the reason for his departure.
- 7 July – The 2023 Young Audio Awards are held, with Radio 1 presenter Jordan North and Kiss presenter Tyler West presenting. A pre-show livestream is presented by Radio 1's Emma-Louise.
- 8 July –
  - BBC Sport presenter Jennie Gow returns to BBC Radio 5 Live's Formula 1 coverage for the first time since her stroke in December 2022, interviewing Lewis Hamilton at the 2023 British Grand Prix.
  - Global Radio launches its "Play Capital" ad campaign on television, social media and outdoors, and featuring artists including Ed Sheeran, Tom Grennan, Dua Lipa and Leigh-Anne Pinnock.
- 9 July – Frisk Radio have created their own cloud-based software system for use by its presenters and staff.
- 11 July – Ofcom gives Bauer Media the go-ahead to change KISS Radio to Greatest Hits Radio on three of its four FM frequencies in the East of England. Kiss will continue on FM in Norwich.
- 14 July – The Hold The Front Page website reports that Global Media are planning a number of changes to their news operation, which includes the closure of regional hubs and the loss of 40 jobs.
- 15 July – BBC Radio Gloucestershire weekend presenter Faye Hatcher announces she has presented her last programme for the station after 23 years with the BBC.
- 16 July – Gordon Smart joins BBC Radio 5 Live to present a Sunday evening show.
- 17 July –
  - Bauer Media announces plans to acquire the JACK FM licences in Oxfordshire, something that will lead to the 106.4FM, 106.8FM and 107.9FM frequencies being rebranded as JACK Media Oxfordshire will retain the rights to the JACK FM brand. JACK FM and JACK 3 Chill currently broadcast on FM in the area.
  - Former BBC Radio Devon presenter Laura James launches a new breakfast show on The Voice.
  - Ofcom issues advice to community radio stations about sticking to their broadcasting obligations after four stations – Drystone Radio, Devonair Gold, Nova Radio North East and Meridian FM – are all found to have broken the broadcasting code in recent months.
- 18 July – Ofcom launches an investigation into Greatest Hits Radio's reporting of a petition urging that criminals to be required to appear in court for sentencing hearings. The Face the Family petition was promoted by several Bauer stations, and was the lead story during Ken Bruce's show on 13 April 2023. Ofcom will examine whether Greatest Hits Radio's reporting of the story was impartial and accurate.
- 19 July – Pippa Quelch hosts her final show on BBC Radio Devon after 30 years on air.
- 21 July – Radio 1 falls silent for five minutes at midday after Greg James fails to complete the 100 hour Radio 1 Giant DJ Hunt during which he had to find 30 presenters who were hiding from him.
- 24 July –
  - Anneka Rice joins Scala Radio to cover Sam Hughes's afternoon show while Hughes is away for the week.
  - Hits Radio announces a partnership with Disney+ for its Summer Staycation feature, with the first event taking place at Weston-Super-Mare on 28 July, and will see Cian Ducrot deliver an acoustic studio performance.
- 26 July – James Hanson, formerly of BBC Radio Bristol, joins Times Radio to present various shows, beginning as a stand-in presenter for Rosie Wright on the early breakfast show.
- 27 July –
  - Steve Lamacq and Jo Whiley present a special edition of 6 Music Evening Session celebrating the 30th anniversary of Britpop.
  - Jeremy Sallis hosts his final show on BBC Radio Cambridgeshire after 21 years of broadcasting.
- 28 July – Talksport presents the Talksport Trophy, a live five-a-side match between Alan Brazil's Breakfast Team and Adrian Durham's talkSPORT All Stars.
- 29 July –
  - On Radio 1, Arielle Free and Charlie Hedges have an on-air disagreement over Hedges' choice of music while broadcasting live from Ibiza. Free is subsequently taken off air while the incident is investigated.
  - The third Kisstory summer outdoor day party of 2023 is held at Blackheath in London.
  - Harry Whittaker presents his last show for BBC Radio York.
- 31 July –
  - Global renews its advertising contract with ITV.
  - Clyde 1 begins livestreaming its Superscoreboard programme via YouTube and Twitter.

=== August ===
- August – BBC Hip Hop 50 airs on radio, iPlayer and BBC Sounds to celebrate 50 years of hip hop.
- 1 August –
  - LBC appoints Sun chief political correspondent Natasha Clark as its political editor; she will take up the role in September.
  - Absolute Radio adds the new station Forgotten 80s to its subscription service.
  - Bauer signs a deal with Audible to promote its content.
- 3 August –
  - RAJAR figures for the second quarter of 2023 indicate that Radio 2 lost a million listeners following the departure of Ken Bruce, while Greatest Hits Radio increased its listenership, with Bruce attracting three million listeners to his new mid-morning show, around 1.23 million more than when Mark Goodier presented in the same timeslot. The figures also show Boom Radio's listenership continues to grow, with an average weekly audience of 641,000, compared to 336,000 listeners during the same quarter of 2022, meaning the station had virtually doubled its audience in a year.
  - Chris Milligan announces his departure from BBC Three Counties Radio to join Sky to take on a new position.
  - Paul Franks presents his final show on BBC Radio WM after 44 years with the broadcaster.
- 4 August – Greatest Hits Radio launches an online music livestream titled "Ken Bruce's Secret 60s".
- 7 August –
  - Former BBC Radio York presenter Jonathan Cowap joins YO1 Radio to host the mid-morning show which will begin from Monday 4 September.
  - The BBC confirms that Richard Latto's Stereo Underground will continue on BBC Radio Solent, despite the majority of similar music shows on the BBC Local network being axed. From 2 September the show will air as an opt-out from networked evening programming.
- 9 August – Paul Salt announces he is leaving the BBC Radio Merseyside breakfast show after two and a half years, but that he will continue on the station with an evening sports programme. His co-presenters, Leanne Harper and Jenny-Lee Summers, will also leave breakfast, but continue elsewhere on BBC Radio Merseyside.
- 10 August –
  - Radio 2 announces that Steve Wright will succeed Paul Gambaccini as presenter of Pick of the Pops, with Gambaccini moving to a new Sunday evening show.
  - A shake-up of presenting roles at Talksport will see Jeff Stelling join to co-present the breakfast show on Mondays and Tuesdays from December.
  - The Radio Today website reports that Global have relaunched the Galaxy brand on their Global Player app with a playlist titled "Galaxy of Stars".
- 11 August –
  - Bauer have signed a deal with Samsung to become the sponsors of the Magic Radio Breakfast Show.
  - Sean Dunderdale presents his final breakfast show at BBC Radio Lincolnshire after three and a half years.
  - Capital XTRA presents a day of special programming to celebrate 50 years of hip hop, including their breakfast show being co-presented by rapper 50 Cent.
  - Actor Vicky McClure and film producer Jonny Owen announce their marriage live on a late night BBC Radio Wales presented by Owen's daughter, Katie Owen, having attended their wedding earlier in the day.
- 13 August –
  - Helen Skelton announces she is leaving her Sunday morning BBC Radio 5 Live show so she can spend more time with her children.
  - Former Forth 1 presenters Alison Craig and John Wood join Edinburgh's Edge Radio to present a Sunday morning show on Edge2.
- 14 August –
  - Global confirms the switch off of its 1548KHz London frequency used by Gold at the end of the month.
  - Scott Dalton begins presenting the breakfast show at BBC Radio Lincolnshire.
- 15 August –
  - Talksport announce a partnership with Amazon Alexa to create an advertising campaign for the new football season.
  - Gateway 97.8 receives the Princess Royal Training Award, the second time it has been given the award.
  - Stephen Bumfrey presents his final programme for BBC Radio Norfolk after 20 years with the station and 43 years with the BBC.
- 17 August –
  - Ofcom has given Birmingham's Big City Radio approval to rebrand as BRMB, bringing the BRMB name back to the city more than a decade after the original BRMB station was rebranded as Free Radio Birmingham.
  - Comedian Tom Binns, creator of the fictional hospital radio presenter Ivan Brackenberry, is sentenced to 10 months imprisonment, suspended for 15 months, after admitting charges relating to 35,000 indecent images of children found on his computer at Derby Crown Court.
- 18 August – BBC Radio Ulster presenter Stephen Nolan apologises on air following a report in The Irish News that he shared an explicit image with BBC colleagues.
- 21 August –
  - Chris Evans tells listeners to his Virgin Radio breakfast show that he has been diagnosed with skin cancer and urges people to get themselves checked for the disease.
  - Radio 2 listeners have chosen "Can't Get You Out of My Head" as their favourite Kylie Minogue song in a Top 40 countdown compiled for a show, Your Ultimate Kylie Song, to air on Monday 28 August.
- 22 August –
  - Capital presents an intimate concert with Leigh-Anne Pinnock at London's Pergola on the Wharf.
  - Radio Caroline launches on Freeview channel 277 via the radio portal, and is available throughout England.
- 25 August – The first Christmas radio station of 2023 goes on air, 122 days before Christmas Day, with the launch of Radio Exe spin-off Radio ExeMas on DAB in Devon.
- 27 August – Bob Brolly presents what turns out to be his final Sunday afternoon show on BBC Local Radio in the West Midlands. During the programme he voices his anger at being asked to "audition" to continue presenting with the BBC. Within days he is informed that he has been taken off air.
- 28 August –
  - My Radio 1 Roadshow at 50 debuts on BBC Sounds to celebrate the 50th anniversary of the first Radio 1 Roadshow.
  - Smooth Radio counts down its 2023 Smooth Icons chart.
  - Scala Radio presents its All Movies Monday during which Charles Nove counts down the top ten most famous film scores recorded at Abbey Road Studios as voted for by listeners.
  - Capital XTRA counts down listeners' top 50 hip hop tracks, with "Gangsta's Paradise" by Coolio featuring L.V. voted as their favourite.
- 29 August –
  - Poole's Hot Radio is found to be in breach of Ofcom's Key Commitment requirements for not broadcasting enough local news or specialist content.
  - Former BBC Radio Stoke presenter Den Siegertsz announces he is joining Churnet Sound Radio to present a new weekly show.
- 30 August –
  - The BBC releases details of some of its networked programming for local radio in the south and east of England, which begins in September.
  - Ofcom finds Leicester community station Radio2Funky to be in breach of its Key Commitment requirements for not broadcasting enough speech content.
- 31 August – Gordon McNamee, one of the founders of the original Kiss FM, is to receive a stone on the Music Walk of Fame located in Camden High Street.

=== September ===
- 1 September –
  - BBC Radio 6 Music presenter Steve Lamacq announces he is scaling back the number of weekday shows he presents after 18 years as presenter of the teatime show. He will take a break from October, before returning in January 2024 to present the show on Mondays, with Huw Stephens presenting the show from Tuesdays to Fridays.
  - The Radio Today website reports that Fun Kids is leaving the national Sound Digital multiplex after seven years, and will instead join a series of local multiplexes.
- 2 September –
  - Rick Edwards succeeds Colin Murray as presenter of BBC Radio 5 Live's Fighting Talk as it returns for a new series.
  - BBC Sounds introduces weekend editions of its Newscast podcast, with presenters Laura Kuenssberg and Paddy O'Connell.
- 4 September –
  - Networked programming begins in the South and East regions of BBC Local Radio, with reports that the first week is beset with technical problems.
  - Greatest Hits Radio launches local radio services for Kent and Northern Ireland.
  - Hits Radio extends its networked drivetime programme to Hits Radio Bristol and Hits Radio South Coast, with local programming on those stations moving to mid-mornings.
  - Big City Radio rebrands its FM and DAB output as BRMB, with Big City Radio continuing online.
  - Phil Munns begins presenting BBC Radio Merseyside breakfast from Mondays to Thursdays.
- 5 September – BBC Radio London reporter Anna O'Neill witnesses an attempted robbery while reporting live from Oxford Street.
- 8 September – Lisa Marrey begins presenting the Friday edition of BBC Radio Merseyside's breakfast show.
- 9 September –
  - From 6pm, BBC 6 Music airs 14 hours of programming dedicated to Northern Soul to celebrate the 50th anniversary of Wigan Casino.
  - Paul McKenna joins Boom Radio to present a one-off show in which he plays his favourite tracks from the 1960s.
- 11 September –
  - Vicky Pattison joins Heart North East to present weekday drivetime alongside Adam Lawrance.
  - Former Kingdom FM presenter Dave Mac joins K107FM to present weekday afternoons.
  - An online advert asking for a new BBC Radio Solent drivetime presenter is removed following negative criticism from listeners, many who pointed out the station had just sacked a number of presenters as part of the BBC Local Radio shake-up.
  - Ofcom finds Stoke Mandeville Hospital Radio in breach of its licence following a complaint about the use of racially discriminatory language on one of its shows broadcast in April.
- 12 September –
  - The BBC announces that Ben Ansell, Professor of Comparative Democratic Institutions at Nuffield College, University of Oxford, will deliver the 2023 Reith Lectures.
  - It is reported that Classic FM presenter Joanna Gosling is to join the family law firm Irwin Mitchell as a senior associate and mediator, helping couple to resolve disputes without going to court. She will continue to present her show on Classic FM.
- 13 September – Jazz FM confirms that the annual Jazz FM Awards will return in Spring 2024, moving back to spring following disruption during the COVID-19 pandemic.
- 14 September – As part of a general schedule shake up, News UK announce a new weekday breakfast show for TalkTV and TalkRadio presented by Jeremy Kyle and Nicola Thorp, with a start date to be confirmed.
- 15 September – The Radio Today website reports that two radio stations in Devon – East Devon Radio and DevonAiR – have started to use AI to read local news bulletins.
- 16 September –
  - Leigh Francis joins Virgin Radio to present Saturday afternoons until 16 December.
  - Fiona Sadler joins Rotherham Radio to present Party Anthems each Saturday evening.
- 17 September – Kylie Minogue headlines the Radio 2 in the Park concert in Leicester.
- 18 September – Petroc Trelawny begins presenting a week of BBC Radio 3 Breakfast programmes from Northern Ireland.
- 19 September – Great British Radio signs Harry Redknapp to give football tips on its Friday morning breakfast show during the 2023–24 season.
- 20 September –
  - Chris Evans tells his listeners he is free of skin cancer eight weeks after his diagnosis with the disease.
  - Northampton's Revolution Radio is fined £400 by Ofcom for a second breach of its licence conditions.
  - Details of shared schedules for BBC Local Radio in Yorkshire are published, but not start date is given for the changes.
- 21 September –
  - A woman who worked in a Los Angeles building shared by the BBC alleges that Russell Brand exposed himself to her in 2008 then joked about the moment on his radio show minutes later.
  - LIVE, the voice of the UK's live music industry, appoints Steve Lamacq as its new Chair.
- 25 September –
  - Regional programme sharing begins on BBC Local Radio in the west, with BBC Radio Bristol, BBC Radio Somerset, BBC Radio Gloucestershire and BBC Radio Wiltshire sharing content.
  - Podcast Radio launches in the United States with stations in Florida, the Carolinas and Detroit.
- 26 September –
  - Bauer announces that it is switching its stations which broadcast on the Sound Digital multiplex to the DAB+ format to make way for the national launch seven more stations – Absolute Radio Country, Absolute Classic Rock, Kerrang!, heat, Magic Chilled, Magic Soul, and Magic at the Musicals. The changes will happen later in the autumn.
  - Vivian Mohr is appointed as President of Bauer Media Audio UK, replacing Richard Dawkins.
- 29 September –
  - BBC Radio 3 announces that Elle Osili-Wood is to become the new presenter of its Sound of Gaming, replacing Louise Blain.
  - BBC Radio Nottingham presenter Andy Whittaker announces he is leaving the station after three decades with the BBC.
  - Global switches off of its 1548KHz London frequency used by Gold. Consequently, the only remaining AM outlet for Gold is in Manchester.
- 30 September –
  - The BBC submits a Public Interest Test with Ofcom over proposals to extend the Welsh language output on BBC Radio Cymru 2.
  - Victory Online in Portsmouth hires Alan Dedicoat to present a weekly Sunday morning programme.
- September – The 2023 Make a Difference Awards are held at a series of events in conjunction with BBC Local Radio.

=== October ===
- 1 October –
  - Global launches The News Agents spin-off podcast, The News Agents Investigates, presented by Lewis Goodall.
  - Bob Brolly joins BRMB to present Bob Brolly's Irish Show on Sunday afternoons.
- 2 October –
  - Gem 106's FM frequency switches over to Greatest Hits Radio while Gem continues to broadcast on DAB.
  - Ian Danter joins Planet Rock to present the weekly Monday Night Rocks.
- 3 October – Jen Thomas joins Planet Rock to present a late night show from Tuesdays to Fridays.
- 5 October –
  - Comedian Steffen Peddie presents his final late show for BBC Radio Newcastle and BBC Radio Tees after six years on the air.
  - BRMB announces plans to hire a number of former BBC Local Radio presenters, including Jimmy Franks, once the BRMB's "flying eye" traffic reporter who later worked at BBC Radio WM, who joins initially to present a show on Saturday lunchtimes, and Ryan Kennedy, a former Beacon Radio breakfast presenter who later worked for BBC Radio Shropshire, who will join the weekend presenting team. Birmingham actor Andre Stewart Daniel is also joining to present a soul vibes and R&B show on Friday and Saturday evenings.
  - Radio Today reports that community station Heartland FM has been saved from closure following a merger with Radio Earn.
- 6 October –
  - Malcolm Boyden presents his final mid-morning show for BBC Hereford & Worcester as a result of changes being implemented to BBC Local Radio.
  - Details of shared afternoon programming for BBC Local Radio in the West Midlands are published; from late October/early November individual stations will continue to have local presenters from 6am to 2pm, with shared programming beginning at 2pm.
  - Small-scale DAB multiplex operator UK DAB Networks is reported to have started proceedings for Voluntary Liquidation.
  - Global's Make Some Noise returns for its tenth appeal, and raises over £3million, taking the collective total raised by the event to £34m.
  - A blue plaque is unveiled in London's Gough Square at the site of Communications House, the headquarters of LBC and IRN from 1973 to 1990, to mark the 50th anniversary of commercial radio in the United Kingdom.
- 7 October – Rebecca May, the former presenter of BBC Introducing on BBC Radio Cambridge, joins Cambridge 105 to present a similar programme.
- 8 October –
  - The first edition of the England-wide networked BBC Local Radio late night show is broadcast. Becky Want presents Late Night Becky from Sunday to Thursday, while Jo Good hosts Fridays and Saturdays.
  - Boom Radio presents a day of special programming to celebrate 50 years of commercial radio in the UK, including a show presented by Michael Aspel, who presented the morning show on Capital Radio from 1974 to 1984.
  - Ray Clark presents his final programme on BBC Essex.
  - Mary Mandefield joins Hits Radio to present Sunday Breakfast.
- 9 October –
  - Schedule changes at Magic Radio include new drivetime presenters, with Tom Price and Kat Shoob taking over the show from Simon Phillips, while Neev Spencer joins to present afternoons.
  - Regional programme sharing begins on BBC Local Radio in the West Midlands.
  - Josef Hollywood joins Capital Liverpool to present weekday drivetime.
  - BBC Radio Cornwall presenter Tiffany Truscott announces she is presenting her final week of the station's evening show after five years on air, and will move to working as a producer for BBC Sounds.
  - Absolute Radio presenter Matt Forde announces he is taking time off from his show to undergo surgery for a spinal tumour.
- 10 October –
  - Details of networked programming for BBC Local Radio in East Yorkshire and Lincolnshire are published.
  - It is reported that Boom Radio has been added to the DAB multiplex in the Channel Islands.
- 12 October –
  - BBC 1Xtra announces plans to launch a second show produced from Birmingham, with DJ Day Day presenting weekday mid-mornings from 22 January 2024.
  - Yorkshire's Your Harrogate Radio agrees a deal to acquire online station Rombalds Radio, which covers Skipton, Ilkley and Keighley.
  - Radio Caroline hires Ray Clark, a BBC Essex presenter whose Sunday night show was broadcast across East Anglia. On Radio Caroline he will present in the same slot.
- 13 October – Singer Lemar joins Magic for seven weeks to present a Friday evening show.
- 14 October – Angellica Bell joins Magic to present Saturday breakfast, while Nicole Appleton joins to present a weekend afternoon show from 4pm to 7pm.
- 15 October – Jo Whiley presents a special edition of Sunday Night is Music Night titled Doctor Who@60: A Musical Celebration on BBC Radio 2.
- 17 October –
  - Ofcom concludes investigations into Salaam Radio in Peterborough, Academy FM 107.8 in Thanet and Ribble FM in Clitheroe, and finds Salaam Radio and Academy FM to have breached its rules.
  - Ofcom appoints Cristina Nicolotti Squires as its Group Director for Broadcasting and Media.
- 21 October – Steve Wright takes over as presenter of Radio 2's Pick of the Pops, succeeding Paul Gambaccini.
- 22 October – Paul Gambaccini begins presenting a new Sunday evening programme on Radio 2.
- 23 October –
  - Simon Phillips joins Jazz FM to take on the weekday drivetime show following the death of previous presenter Jamie Crick.
  - Bauer introduces Hits Radio programming to Lincs FM except for its breakfast show, which remains a local programme.
- 24 October – Justin Kings, a former news editor at Capital and the BBC, is appointed as the new Head of the EBU Academy, replacing Nathalie Labourdette.
- 25 October –
  - Networked scheduling details are released for BBC Local Radio in the South East of England.
  - Ofcom finds two community station in breach of their licences after failing to provide recordings following complaints. Islands FM had content missing from the period appertaining to the complaint, while Heata FM provided recordings for the wrong week.
- 26 October – The RAJAR figures for the third quarter of 2023 are released, showing an average of 49.5 million people listening each week, which equates to 88% of the adult population. They include figures for Radio 2 and Greatest Hits Radio following Ken Bruce's departure from the former, with Bruce attracting 3.7 million weekly listeners to his new show. Vernon Kay, who took over from Bruce, achieves a weekly audience of 6.9 million, 1.7 million less than Bruce did during his time at Radio 2. Kay's show remains Radio 2's most popular programme though.
- 30 October – Bauer launches Greatest Hits Radio and Hits Radio in Oxfordshire, replacing Jack FM.
- 31 October –
  - BBC presenter Jason Rosam confirms his BBC Radio London early breakfast show from 5am to 7am, which is shared on BBC Local Radio between 5am and 6am, will end on 5 January 2024.
  - Sam Lavery and Sarah Devine are to join Capital Dance to present shows on Friday and Saturday evenings.
  - To celebrate Halloween, an AI version of regular Hits Radio Breakfast co-presenter Fleur East joins the show to interact with the on air team and listeners.

=== November ===
- 2 November – Happy Radio have signed former Emmerdale actor Liam Fox to present The Saturday Sports Roundup on Saturday afternoons.
- 6 November –
  - Molly Sutton joins Hits Radio Pride to present weekday afternoons.
  - TalkRadio launches a new schedule which sees some of its presenters moving to different slots, including Julia Hartley-Brewer and Mike Graham.
- 7 November –
  - The King's Speech includes plans for the Media Bill during the next parliamentary session. The bill proposes major deregulation of commercial radio and support for radio stations on smart speakers.
  - Richard Knight is appointed Director of Audio by BBC Studios.
- 8 November –
  - Ofcom revokes the DAB licence award given to Wigan & St Helens Community Media CIC, saying it has reasonable grounds to believe the service cannot be launched within the 18 months designated for it to be launched.
  - Carol Vorderman confirms she is to leave her weekly Saturday morning show on BBC Radio Wales after breaching the BBC's impartiality rules by posting content critical of the UK government on X.
  - The Media Bill receives its first reading in the House of Commons.
- 9 November – Duncan Barkes joines More Radio Retro to present The Nightshift from Sundays to Thursdays.
- 10 November – BBC Sounds has updated its skill to enable Amazon Alexa users to listen on multiple speakers, its Head of Product confirms.
- 11 November – It is announced that GHR's remaining medium wave transmissions, in Scotland and northern England, will cease by the end of the year with the station continuing on DAB in the affected areas. The AM relay of Downtown Radio in Northern Ireland will also be switched off by the end of 2023.
- 12 November – Dotun Adebayo launches an England-wide Sunday evening programme on BBC Local Radio, which is presented from London. The programme is broadcast on all of the BBC's local radio stations.
- 13 November – Owen Warner joins Hits Radio to present Sam Thompson's weekday evening show.
- 14 November –
  - Academy fm Thanet, The Eye and Sittingbourne Community Radio are honoured with the King's Award for Voluntary Service.
  - Radio Marsden stages a night of stand up comedy at the Harlequin Theatre in Redhill in aid of the hospital broadcasting service.
  - Members of the National Union of Journalists vote to end their dispute over changes to BBC Local Radio, with 70% of the 55% turnout accepting a deal with BBC management.
- 16 November –
  - Bauer Media confirms that Lancashire's Rock FM and Liverpool's Radio City will have a joint breakfast show from January 2024, with Rock FM's Joel Ross and Radio City's Leanne Campbell presenting.
  - Virgin Radio confirm that Ryan Tubridy will present a weekday mid morning show from January 2024, with the programme also simulcasting on Dublin's Q102 in Ireland.
- 20 November – Andy Diprose, former Head of News at Chiltern Radio, is appointed News Editor of Bournemouth One ahead of its launch on 1 January 2024.
- 21 November – Global's Make Some Noise Night raises £11.1m for charity.
- 23 November –
  - Radio 2 broadcasts a Radio 2 in Concert performance by Take That, recorded at the BBC Radio Theatre.
  - BBC Radio 4 announces its list of guest presenters for the Today programme over the festive season; they include singer Ellie Goulding, television presenter James May and author Hanif Kureishi.
- 24 November – Ofcom opens a consultation after Middlesbrough's Community Voice FM submits a request to change its key commitments.
- 26 November –
  - Penny Smith and Alfie Boe compere Scala Radio Presents: Classics at Christmas at The London Palladium.
  - A number of radio stations in South Wales join together for a 60-hour appeal to raise £350,000 for the Tŷ Hafan children's hospice.
  - Craig Kingham, a producer on The Big Top 40 and its predecessors, produces his final edition of the programme, after almost 24 years and 1,200 number one singles.
- 27 November – Magic Radio changes its playlist to 100% Christmas songs until midnight on Boxing Day.
- 28 November –
  - The Radio Today website reports that Bauer Media is to remove all of its radio stations from Sky, Virgin Media and Freesat by 13 December.
  - Clint Boon confirms he is leaving XS Manchester's drivetime show after seven years. He will be replaced by Hywel Evans from January 2024.
- 30 November – Bauer Media Group launches a new brand and corporate logo.

=== December ===
- 1 December –
  - Downtown Radio switches its playlist to entirely Christmas songs for the rest of the lead up to Christmas.
  - Andrew Peach announces he is leaving BBC Radio Berkshire after 31 years.
- 2 December –
  - Claudia Winkleman announces she will leave her BBC Radio 2 Saturday morning show in March 2024. Romesh Ranganathan will take over the slot.
  - Boom Radio says it will play the uncensored version of "Fairytale of New York" after 91% of listeners who contributed to a poll said they would not be offended by it.
- 3 December – Steve Wright presents a one-off show with Peter Kay on Radio 2.
- 4 December –
  - Great British Radio is scheduled to launch nationwide on the Sound Digital platform, but does not appear, and on 21 December the station announces it has ceased trading, and will end broadcasting from midnight.
  - Jeff Stelling joins talkSPORT breakfast to co-present the show on Mondays and Tuesdays.
- 6 December – Samir Shah is appointed as the new chairman of the BBC.
- 7 December –
  - Radio 2 traffic reporter Sally Boazman is the 2023 recipient of the Special Contribution to Motoring Award from the Guild of Motor Writers.
  - Fix Radio have launched a poll to ask listeners if they want the station to play Christmas hits, with votes closing on 15 December.
- 8 December –
  - Ofcom revokes the small-scale DAB licence for Harrogate and Wetherby after the company awarded the licence said the project was no longer viable.
  - Launch of Jokes on BBC Sounds, a podcast feed containing both new and archive comedy from Radio 4. The feed kicks off with Nora Meadows' Week of Wellness, a comedy about a therapist and her clients.
  - KMFM have received 13,800 toys for their Give a Gift campaign for unwell and disadvantaged children in Kent.
  - Basildon-based Gateway 97.8 receives money from the National Lottery Community Fund to work with young people.
- 9 December – Former BBC Radio Merseyside presenter Frankie Connor joins Liverpool Live Radio to present a Saturday afternoon show.
- 10 December – Hits Radio presenter Sam Thompson wins the 23rd series of I'm A Celebrity...Get Me Out Of Here!.
- 11 December – Bauer shuts down all of its remaining MW Greatest Hits Radio transmissions.
- 12 December – Clara Amfo announces she is leaving her Future Sounds show on Radio 1, with Jack Saunders replacing her on the evening show from April 2024.
- 13 December –
  - Virgin Radio confirms that mid-morning presenter Eddy Temple-Morris will move to drivetime on Virgin Radio Anthems in 2024 to make way for the arrival of Ryan Tubridy.
  - TuneIn and CountryLine Radio have signed a deal with The Big 615, a station owned by country singer Garth Brooks, and will rebrand as CountryLine Radio: The Big 615 in January 2024.
  - Bauer removes all of its radio stations, including Greatest Hits Radio, from the Sky and Virgin Media platforms.
- 15 December –
  - Tim Lihoreau announces he is standing down as presenter of Classic FM's More Music Breakfast from January 2024, but will continue to present on the network.
  - BFBS unveils its Christmas schedule, which includes a special programme presented by Dom Joly.
- 17 December – Tony Blackburn presents his final Soul on Sunday show for BBC Radio London, having decided to leave the station after four decades.
- 18 December –
  - Speaking on BBC Radio 4's The Today Podcast, television presenter Dame Esther Rantzen, who has been diagnosed with stage four lung cancer, reveals that she has joined the Dignitas organisation and plans to "buzz off to Zurich" if her treatment does not work. Her comments reopen the debate about assisted dying in the United Kingdom.
  - Ofcom finds Blackpool's Coastal Radio DAB in breach of its regulations for an incident on 13 August when it played the track "Drivers Licence" by Olivia Rodrigo, a song containing explicit lyrics, shortly after 1pm.
  - Bauer places the offices of Stoke-on-Trent's Signal 1 on the market for £600,000, having taken the decision to move the station's broadcasting team to Birmingham.
- 21 December –
  - Lyca Group buys Asian Sound Radio in Lancashire and Greater Manchester.
  - Heart overnight presenter Simon Beale confirms he will replace Roberto as presenter of the breakfast show on Heart 80s from January 2024.
- 24 December – Dean Martin returns to Dragon Radio to present the first of two programmes over the festive period, with his second airing on New Year's Eve.
- 25 December – Julian Clary presents a musical tribute to Paul O'Grady on Boom Radio. Angela Rippon also presents a show on the station.
- 26 December –
  - BBC Local Radio airs Make a Difference – Keeping the Faith at Christmas, a special programme in which Kylie Minogue thanks BBC Make a Difference Award winners for the acts of selflessness and bravery that won the awards. The programme also features Rick Astley and James Blunt.
  - Chris Tarrant returns to Boom Radio to present his first Christmas show.
- 28 December – Figures released by the BBC show there were two billion plays of music, podcasts and radio stations on BBC Sounds during 2023.
- 29 December – Those from the world of radio to be recognised in the 2024 New Year Honours include Ashley Tabor-King (CBE), Steve Wright (MBE), James Whale (MBE), Jeff Stelling (MBE) and Tony Blackburn (OBE).
- 30 December – Angellica Bell announces her departure from her Saturday morning show on Scala Radio so she can focus on her show on Magic Radio.

== Station debuts ==
=== Terrestrial ===
- 13 February – Capital Chill
- 16 February – Radio X Classic Rock
- 21 February – BASINGSTOKE NOW
- 1 March – Nation New
- 29 April – Base Radio
- 8 May – Sunrise Smooth
- 12 June – Cat Xtra
- 26 June – Bro Radio
- 25 August – Radio ExeMas
- 4 September –
  - Amber Radio (relaunch)
  - BRMB (relaunch)
- 29 September – City Sound Radio
- 20 October – ALL FM 96.9
- 1 November – Sound Radio Liverpool

=== Online ===
- 19 January – Jonny Gould's Jewish State Podcast Radio
- 10 February – Absolute Radio Kevin
- 2 May – Eurosong Radio (a pop-up online station from Bauer)
- June – Suffolk Sound
- 22 September – Greatest Hits Grooves
- 1 October – The VIP Lounge Online (relaunch)
- 10 November – Virgin Radio Celebrates Diwali (pop-up station for Diwali)

== Small-scale multiplex switch-ons ==
- 19 March – Leicester
- 11 April – Wolverhampton
- 4 August – South Durham
- 6 October – High Peak
- 1 November – Liverpool
- 20 November – Stirling and Falkirk

== Programme debuts ==
- Dance Britannia, a six part series charting the history of British dance music presented by Sister Bliss on Kisstory.
- January – Uplifting Classics with Dr Alex George, a six week series on Classic FM
- 22 January – Zhenya Shkil (Ukrainian language programme) on Radio Bath
- 23 January – Buried, a ten-part series investigating the secret dumping of a million tons of waste in Northern Ireland, on BBC Radio 4
- 3 February – Friday Night with Nadine on Talkradio
- 13 February – The Radio 2 Early Breakfast Show with Owain Wyn Evans on BBC Radio 2
- 26 February –
  - Jazz, Blues and Soul with Duncan Barkes on Regency Radio
  - The Kanneh-Mason Family Takeover, a six-part series presented by the Kanneh-Mason family on Classic FM
- 6 March – 10 to the Top on BBC Radio 2
- 28 March – The Listening Party with Tim Burgess, a six-part weekly show on Absolute Radio
- 28 April – Badger and the Blitz on Fun Kids
- 31 May – Fukushima, a seven-part drama about the 2011 Fukushima nuclear disaster on BBC World Service (available on BBC Sounds from 15 May)
- 3 June – Let's Do the Time warp Again: The Rocky Horror Story, presented by Ore Oduba on BBC Radio 2.
- 9 June – The Tiffany Calver Show on BBC Radio 1Xtra
- 18 June – The Nation Network Chart with Dr Fox on Nation Broadcasting stations
- 3 July – Overtime with Wes Stakes and Leanne Dundas on Fix Radio
- 8 August – File on Four: Jon Holmes, Generation Shame, a programme about forced adoption presented by Jon Holmes on BBC Radio 4
- 19 August – Jazz on Screen with Tim Smith, a three-part series celebrating jazz found on film and television series soundtracks, on Jazz FM
- 3 September – Music Lessons with YolanDa Brown on Scala Radio
- 29 October – The Story of UK Soul, an eight part series presented by Simon Phillips on Jazz FM
- 26 December – 12 Drummers Drumming with John Thomson on Absolute Radio

== Podcast debuts ==
- 21 February – The Fast and the Curious (Formula 1 podcast presented by Greg James, Betty Glover and Christian Hewgill)
- 20 June – The News Agents USA, weekly podcast presented by Jon Sopel and Emily Maitlis for Global Radio
- 21 June – The Two Matts, podcast with Matthew d'Ancona and Matt Kelly, from The New European.
- 28 July – Your Next Podcast, presented by Lauren Layfield of Capital Radio
- 19 August – Swipe Your Sign, a black, queer dating podcast from BBC 1Xtra on BBC Sounds
- 28 August – Era: Kylie Minogue from BBC Radio 2 and on BBC Sounds
- 11 September – X-Posure Daily with John Kennedy, Global's first on demand podcast, on Global Player
- 26 September – They Don't Teach This At School with Myleene Klass on Global Player
- 1 October – The News Agents Investigates, a weekly podcast presented by Lewis Goodall for Global Radio
- 8 October – The Conflict: Israel-Gaza War on BBC Sounds presented by Lyse Doucet
- 16 October – Shaun Keaveny's Daily Grind on Global Player
- 21 October – Many Capital Returns presented by David Symonds on Global Player
- 23 October – Reel Talk with Jonathan and Honey Ross on Global Player
- 17 November – One Direction: A Fan's Story with Maddie Grace Jepson on BBC Sounds
- 8 December – Jokes, new and archive comedy content from Radio 4, on BBC Sounds

== Changes of network affiliation ==
Show	Moved from	Moved to
Ken Bruce's show and PopMaster	BBC Radio 2	Greatest Hits Radio

== Continuing radio programmes ==
=== 1940s ===
- Desert Island Discs (1942–Present)
- Woman's Hour (1946–Present)
- A Book at Bedtime (1949–Present)

=== 1950s ===
- The Archers (1950–Present)
- Pick of the Pops (1955–Present)
- The Today Programme (1957–Present)

=== 1960s ===
- Farming Today (1960–Present)
- In Touch (1961–Present)
- The World at One (1965–Present)
- The Official Chart (1967–Present)
- Just a Minute (1967–Present)
- The Living World (1968–Present)

=== 1970s ===
- PM (1970–Present)
- Start the Week (1970–Present)
- You and Yours (1970–Present)
- I'm Sorry I Haven't a Clue (1972–Present)
- Good Morning Scotland (1973–Present)
- Newsbeat (1973–Present)
- File on 4 (1977–Present)
- Money Box (1977–Present)
- The News Quiz (1977–Present)
- Feedback (1979–Present)
- The Food Programme (1979–Present)
- Science in Action (1979–Present)

=== 1980s ===
- In Business (1983–Present)
- Sounds of the 60s (1983–Present)
- Loose Ends (1986–Present)

=== 1990s ===
- The Moral Maze (1990–Present)
- Essential Selection (1991–Present)
- Night Waves (1992–Present)
- Essential Mix (1993–Present)
- Up All Night (1994–Present)
- Wake Up to Money (1994–Present)
- Private Passions (1995–Present)
- In Our Time (1998–Present)
- Material World (1998–Present)
- PopMaster (1998–Present)
- The Now Show (1998–Present)

=== 2000s ===
- BBC Radio 2 Folk Awards (2000–Present)
- Big John @ Breakfast (2000–Present)
- Sounds of the 70s (2000–2008, 2009–Present)
- Dead Ringers (2000–2007, 2014–Present)
- A Kist o Wurds (2002–Present)
- Fighting Talk (2003–Present)
- Jeremy Vine (2003–Present)
- The Chris Moyles Show (2004–2012, 2015–Present)
- Elaine Paige on Sunday (2004–Present)
- The Bottom Line (2006–Present)
- The Unbelievable Truth (2006–Present)
- Radcliffe & Maconie (2007–Present)
- The Media Show (2008–Present)
- Newsjack (2009–Present)

=== 2010s ===
- The Third Degree (2011–Present)
- BBC Radio 1's Dance Anthems (2012–Present)
- Sounds of the 80s (2013–Present)
- Question Time Extra Time (2013–Present)
- The Show What You Wrote (2013–Present)
- Friday Sports Panel (2014–Present)
- Stumped (2015–Present)
- You, Me and the Big C (2018–present)
- Radio 1's Party Anthems (2019–present)

=== 2020s ===
- Frank Skinner's Poetry Podcast (2020–Present)
- Newscast (2020–Present)
- Sounds of the 90s (2020–present)
- Life Changes (2021–present)
- Romesh Ranganathan: For The Love of Hip Hop (2021–present)
- The News Agents (2022–Present)
- Ten to the Top (2023–Present)

== Closing this year ==
- 21 December – Great British Radio (2021–2023)

== Deaths ==
- 4 January – Aled Glynne Davies, 65, broadcaster and former editor of BBC Radio Cymru (went missing on 31 December 2022, body found on date)
- 24 January – Phil Dawson, 77, founder and director of Fantasy Radio, and breakfast show presenter (death reported on date)
- 13 February – Denis McNeill, Q Radio Belfast presenter
- February – Paul Easton, 69, radio programme producer (reported on 20 February)
- 19 February – Dickie Davies, 94, inaugural sports commentator of Classic FM
- 23 February – John Motson, 77, football commentator (BBC Sport)
- 28 March
  - Paul O'Grady, 67, radio DJ and entertainer (Paul O'Grady on the Wireless on BBC Radio 2)
  - Sophie Shardlow, 57, editor of BBC Radio Nottingham and BBC Radio Leicester
- 6 April – Nicola Heywood-Thomas, 67, broadcaster (BBC Radio Wales)
- 7 April – Gareth Richards, 43, comedian and radio presenter (Absolute Radio)
- 22 April – Len Goodman, 78, ballroom dancer and presenter (Boom Radio)
- 30 April – Elizabeth Scott, Duchess of Buccleuch (1954–2023), wife of Richard Scott, 10th Duke of Buccleuch, and broadcaster (BBC Radio 4 (Kaleidoscope), BBC Radio Solway)
- 20 May – Mike Carey, 87, broadcaster (BBC Radio Derby)
- June – Barry Bethell, 80, broadcaster (BBC Radio Kent, KMFM, Invicta) (reported on 20 June)
- June –
  - Avtar Singh Lit, 73, founder of Sunrise Radio (Reported on 27 June)
  - Tim Blackmore, 78, radio executive (Reported on 29 June)
- 4 July – Nicholas Tresilian, 85, radio executive
- 11 July – Michael Bakewell, 92, radio and television producer and scriptwriter
- 14 July – Tony Butler, 88, sports broadcaster (BRMB, BBC Radio WM, Gold)
- 16 August – Michael Parkinson, 88, broadcaster (Desert Island Discs on BBC Radio 4, Parkinson's Sunday Supplement on BBC Radio 2)
- 29 August – Jamie Crick, 57, broadcaster (Classic FM, Jazz FM, Scala Radio)
- 13 September – Maddy Anholt, 35, comedian actor and author
- September – Brian Savin, 77, radio presenter and executive (BRMB, Saga 105.7FM) (reported on 23 September)
- 4 October – Robin Rumboll, 84, radio executive and Jersey politician who founded Channel 103
- 6 October – George Andrews, 64, sports broadcaster (BBC Radio Stoke, Signal Radio)
- October – Martin Campbell, radio journalist, manager and commentator (Radio Trent, BRMB, GWR, Allied Radio, Talk Radio) (Reported on 24 October)
- 23 October – David McGealy, 74, Managing Director of Oldham Community Radio
- 29 October – Trevor Hill, 98, British radio and television producer (Children's Hour, Round Britain Quiz, Sooty), director and writer.
- 11 November – Helen Place, presenter, newsreader and journalist (BBC Radio 5 Live, BBC Radio York)
- 15 November – John Rea, broadcaster (Huntingdon Community Radio)
- 27 November – Bobi MacLennan, 61, presenter (Moray Firth Radio, Scot FM)
- 28 November – Ernie Almond, 80, broadcaster (BBC Three Counties Radio)
- 1 December – John Burley, 78, chairman of Island FM (reported on this date)
- 6 December – Russell Hargreaves, 45, sports presenter (Talksport) (reported on this date)
- 21 December – Oliver Emanuel, 43, English playwright and radio dramatist. (death announced on this date)
- 22 December – Ian Pepperell, 53, actor (The Archers)

== See also ==
- 2023 in the United Kingdom
- 2023 in British music
- 2023 in British television
- List of British films of 2023
