= 2026 in British radio =

This is a list of events taking place in 2026 relating to radio in the United Kingdom.

== Events ==
=== January ===
- 1 January –
  - BBC Radio 4 celebrates the 75th anniversary of The Archers with a day of programmes and drama dedicated to the rural soap. It includes a re-enactment of the opening scene of the first episode broadcast on 1 January 1951, the original episode having been lost.
  - Radio X listeners have voted the Wolf Alice single "The Sofa" as their Record of the Year for 2025 in the station's annual poll of music for the year.
- 2 January – Tiffany Calver presents her final edition of BBC Radio 1Xtra's The Rap Show after seven years as its host.
- 6 January –
  - Launch of STV Radio (Scotland), with Ewen Cameron and Cat Harvey presenting the weekday breakfast show.
  - Bauer Media adds local news, weather and travel to Hits Radio UK in Scotland.
- 12 January – Comedian Josh James joins Fix Radio as drivetime presenter. Previous hosts Rich and Trev move to Saturdays as part of changes to the weekend schedule.
- 15 January – Amol Rajan announces he is leaving his role as presenter of BBC Radio 4's The Today Programme to start his own company.
- 17 January – Daryl Robinson joins Fix Radio to present a Saturday morning programme.
- 19 January – Magic Radio hires Claire Sturgess to present the breakfast show on Mellow Magic, and announces that current presenter Jen Thomas will move to afternoons on Magic Musicals.
- 23 January – Cheshire's Mix 56 partners with Cadent Gas to promote its programme of community engagement across Cheshire.
- 24 January – Jazz FM presenter Helen Mayhew announces her retirement from broadcasting, with her final show airing on 30 January.
- 26 January –
  - BBC Radio 5 Live appoints Steffan Powell as permanent Breakfast co-presenter on Fridays and Sundays, and Rima Ahmed as co-presenter on Fridays.
  - Magic unveils a new weekend schedule, which includes Rich Clarke presenting Saturday Breakfast.
- 29 January – It is announced that Alun Thomas has been hired by BBC Radio Cymru to present Post Prynhawn from Tuesdays to Fridays.
- 31 January – BBC Radio 2 repeats its 2022 programme Wogan: In His Own Words to mark the 10th anniversary of Sir Terry Wogan's death.

=== February ===
- 2 February – The Radio 2 Piano Room returns throughout February, beginning with Pulp on 2 February and ending with Jessie J on 26 February.
- 3 February – BBC Radio 6 Music announces plans to launch a streaming service on BBC Sounds dedicated to indie music from the 1980s to the 2010s.
- 4 February – Times Radio confirms a schedule refresh beginning later in February, which includes the addition of Jane Mulkerrins on Saturday afternoons and Ryan Tubridy on Sunday afternoons. They will replace Chloe Tilley and Alexis Conran.
- 5 February – Release of the RAJAR figures for the final quarter of 2025, which indicate that 50 million people in the UK are listening to radio on a weekly basis.
- 9 February –
  - Ofcom finds LBC in breach of its rules after broadcaster James O'Brien failed to properly contextualise an email from a listener during a discussion about the Gaza war in July 2025.
  - Ofcom finds talkRADIO in breach of its regulations after a caller used the C-word during a mid-morning programme in September 2025.
- 10 February – Bauer Media Audio UK secures a three-month sponsorship deal with PG Tips for the brand to sponsor PopMaster on Greatest Hits Radio from the end of February.
- 12 February – The UK government begins a review of radio broadcasting beyond 2030 should the decision be made to switch off FM transmissions.
- 16 February – Comedian Bobby Davro officially reopens the Gateway 97.8 studios in Basildon.
- 18 February – The Prince of Wales joins an edition of BBC Radio 1's Life Hacks for a discussion on mental health and male suicide.
- 20 February – The winners of the 2026 Radio 1 Dance Awards are announced.
- 23 February –
  - BBC Radio Cymru 2 launches Diwrnod Gorau Erioed, four weeks of competitions with a different prize available each week, ranging from live events to sporting fixtures and television finals. It is the station's biggest ever competition.
  - Central FM moves into new studios in Bridge of Allan.
- 24 February –
  - Ofcom finds KCC Live in breach of its licence after being continuously off-air since December 2024.
  - Pierre Petrou steps down as operations manager of Radio Maria England after a three-year expansion which has seen the station broadcasting in 17 areas of the UK.
- 25 February – Ofcom confirms plans for new mandatory regulations to require local analogue stations to produce a certain amount of local news coverage on weekdays.
- 28 February – Having been off the station since October, BBC Radio Scotland confirms that Kaye Adams will not be returning to her morning show on the network.

=== March ===
- 1 March –
  - Robert Robertson, lead singer of Tide Lines, presents a programme about Scottish music for STV Radio.
  - Absolute Radio launches a season of monthly artist residencies, starting with Clint Boon in March. Future residencies will be KT Tunstall in April, Felix White in May, Sergio Pizzorno in June and Ricky Wilson in July.
  - Hospital Radio Glamorgan becomes available on DAB in Cardiff and the Vale of Glamorgan.
- 2 March –
  - Data released by Radiocentre indicates that commercial radio advertising generated £747m during 2025.
  - Greenwich Media CIC acquires the assets of Made in Kent Radio, which closed in December 2025, and will relaunch it in April 2026.
- 7 March – Stephanie Hirst joins Greatest Hits Radio to present Spinnin' the Decades, a show she has previously presented on Greatest Hits Radio 60s.
- 8 March –
  - Katherine Jenkins presents a special programme to mark International Women's Day on Classic FM.
  - Heart Musicals broadcasts live backstage from the 2026 WhatsOnStage Awards.
  - The Monarchs Blues Band, a band with members from North Wales and Cheshire, are announced as the winners of One More Dream, a competition run by Boom Radio to give a band, group or artist another shot at fame.
- 9 March –
  - Nation Radio launches regional programming for Somerset.
  - Lorna Bailey takes over as weekday breakfast show presenter on BBC CWR.
- 12 March –
  - Liza Tarbuck confirms she is leaving her Radio 2 Saturday evening show, having last been on air on 17 January.
  - It is announced that The Archers will celebrate its 75th anniversary with a live stage tour hosted by comedian and fan Angela Barnes.
- 17 March – Nation Radio announces its presenter line up for Devon and Cornwall ahead of a DAB launch in the area.
- 19 March –
  - Lucy Bacon is appointed Deputy Managing Editor of Classic FM.
  - BBC 1Xtra announces that Sian Anderson will join in September to present weekday afternoons, taking over from Kaylee Golding.
- 20 March – Greg James raises £4m for Comic Relief after completing a tandem cycling challenge.
- 22 March – As part of BBC Radio 4 Extra's listener request weekend, an interview that Iain Mann recorded with Kenny Everett for BBC Radio Merseyside in February 1976 receives its first national broadcast.
- 23 March –
  - Peterborough's Salaam Radio is fined £400 by Ofcom for failing to meet its licence Key Commitments in June 2024.
  - Craig Hunter is appointed as Managing Director of the newly launched Global Studios.
- 24 March – Radio 2 newsreader Harvey Cook announces his departure from the network.
- 25 March –
  - Former Google executive Matt Brittin is appointed as the next Director-General of the BBC, succeeding Tim Davie, and will take up the post from May.
  - Gary Davies stands in for Scott Mills on his Radio 2 breakfast show.
- 28 March – Musician Dave Stewart joins presenter Elliot Moss alongside entrepreneur and investor Dominic Joseph for the first in a two-part special edition of Jazz FM's business series, Jazz Shapers, with the second part airing on 4 April.
- 30 March
  - Scott Mills is dismissed from BBC Radio 2 following complaints about his "personal conduct".
  - Nation Radio extends its coverage to DAB on Devon and Cornwall.
- 31 March –
  - The BBC begins the process of ending transmissions of BBC Radio 5 Live on MW when it closes its transmitter in Bexhill-on-Sea.
  - BBC Radio Guernsey and BBC Radio Jersey stop broadcasting on MW.

=== April ===
- 1 April – Nation Broadcasting acquires Radio Exe.
- 2 April –
  - Rebecca Keating is named as the new editor of BBC Radio 4's The Today Programme.
  - Boom Rock is made available on DAB in London.
  - Ofcom gives Glow Radio permission to broaden its key commitments so it can extend its programming beyond a target audience of those aged under 40.
- 4 April –
  - Times Radio provides coverage of the 2026 Boat Race after securing a three-year exclusive radio broadcasting rights deal to cover the event a few weeks earlier.
  - Paul Burnett joins 80s Heaven to present two weekly shows on Saturdays and Mondays.
- 5 April – So Solid Crew member Lisa Maffia joins Capital XTRA to present Sunday afternoons.
- 6 April –
  - The Armed Man: A Mass for Peace by Sir Karl Jenkins is voted the most popular work in the Classic FM Hall of Fame 2026.
  - Radio X completes its countdown of listeners top 500 British tracks, with the 1994 Oasis track "Live Forever" at number one.
- 9 April –
  - Ofcom awards small-scale DAB licences for Ballymena, Barnsley, Lincoln, South West Fife and South West Sussex.
  - Nation Radio is to move its streaming services to a new platform as part of a deal with Arqiva.
  - Frisk Radio secures a deal with Flamingo Land to sponsor its weekday breakfast show.
- 10 April –
  - Former Hits Radio presenter Leanne Campbell will join BBC Radio Merseyside to present Friday mid-mornings.
  - Jenny Powell succeeds Martin Kemp as presenter of the Greatest Hits Radio Mix Tape show.
- 12 April – Bauer unveils new branding logos for Kiss as it seeks to target the rise in digital media.
- 13 April – Marvin Humes joins Hits Radio to present weekday mid-afternoons.
- 14 April – Boom Radio announces plans for a pop-up station devoted to the music and events of 1966 and titled Boom 66 to air on 30 July to coincide with the England national football team's victory at the 1966 FIFA World Cup final.
- 15 April – The BBC confirms that Radio 4’s longwave broadcasts will be closing "later this year". Approximately two months notice will be given prior to the broadcasts being switched off.
- 16 April – The 2026 Jazz FM Awards will take place at Koko in London.
- 17 April –
  - Denise van Outen co-presents a one-off Gaydio Big Breakfast alongside Dave Cooper.
  - Rio Fredrika joins Kiss to present Friday and Saturday evenings.
  - Maxxwave takes over the High Peak small-scale DAB multiplex from High Peak One Digital Ltd after the latter experienced financial pressures, allowing the multiplex to stay on air.
- 20 April – Launch of the Official Radio 1 Dance Chart, presented by Arielle Free on Radio 1 Dance, and part of a schedule refresh for the station.
- 23 April –
  - The BBC announces that Sara Cox will take over as presenter of The Radio 2 Breakfast Show from the summer, with a presenter to replace her on the drivetime show to be confirmed at a later date.
  - BBC Radio 2 presenter Bob Harris says his prostate cancer has spread to his spine, but that he is "now on the pathway to recovery".
- 24 April –
  - BBC Radio 1 warns listeners against buying tickets for its Big Weekend from ticket touts.
  - Ofcom gives the go-ahead for BBC Radio 6 Music to introduce a streaming service, having concluded that doing so would not harm competition.
  - The Wales Community Radio Network has produced a special election programme ahead of the 2026 Senedd election.
  - BFBS secures a new ten year agreement with the Ministry of Defence to continue providing radio, news and entertainment to British forces around the world.
- 25 April –
  - BBC Radio 1Xtra stages its first club night with the 1Xtra Takeover at EartH Hall in Hackney.
- 29 April – Following the Dismissal of Scott Mills, The BBC reschedules the first Radio 2 in the Park to be conducted in Scotland, which is to be held in Stirling, from 7–9 August to 11–13 September to avoid it clashing with local events.
- 30 April – Bauer Media stages its 2026 Cash for Kids Day, which includes a UK-wide music quiz presented by Ant & Dec. Guinness World Records later confirms the broadcast set a new record for the largest number of participants in an online music quiz.

=== May ===
- 1 May – Niall Gray takes over Friday and Saturday evenings on Hits Radio, replacing Owen Warner.
- 3 May – The Radio Today website reports that the BBC Radio Car is to be discontinued as an on-demand service, but will remain available for occasional events.
- 4 May –
  - Kirsten O'Brien joins BBC Radio 2 as the afternoon traffic reporter, having presented shows for BBC Radio Berkshire for eight years.
  - Smooth Radio listeners vote George Michael's "Careless Whisper" number one in the station's All Time Top 500.
- 12 May – Paul and Nicola Chadbourne take control of Mansfield 103.2 FM.
- 14 May –
  - Publication of the RAJAR figures for the first quarter of 2026. Commercial radio accounts for 54.3% of all radio listening, compared to 43.4% for the BBC, a difference of 7.91 million listeners. Listening via smart speakers also accounts for 20% of radio listening.
  - 1970 Eurovision Song Contest winner Dana presents a Eurovision special on Boom Radio ahead of this year's final.
- 15 May – Matthew Biggs makes his final appearance on Gardeners' Question Time, ahead of his death on 21 May, after 30 years with the programme.
- 17 May – A scheduling error leads to Radio 2 listeners hearing the wrong second hour of Elaine Paige on Sunday when the second half of the previous week's show is repeated. The BBC later updates the BBC Sounds version of the show with the correct edition, and apologises to its listeners.
- 18 May – Global announces a partnership deal with McLaren Racing.
- 19 May – Radio Caroline issues an apology after accidentally broadcasting a message announcing the death of King Charles III. A studio error is blamed for the mistake.
- 22 May – Prince William joins Heart Breakfast live from the Isles of Scilly.
- 22–24 May – BBC Radio 1's Big Weekend takes place in Herrington Country Park, Sunderland. Acts include Fatboy Slim and Sonny Fodera (22 May), Zara Larsson, Louis Tomlinson and Lola Young (23 May), and Olivia Dean, Niall Horan and Kehlani (24 May).
- 25 May – Sandie Shaw presents a two-hour special for Spring Bank Holiday Monday on Boom Radio.
- 26 May - Heart officially confirms the return of its Make Me A Millionaire competition, with the contest running on the network's spinoff stations for the first time.
- 28 May –
  - talkSPORT secures a deal with MotoGP and TNT Sports for the radio rights to MotoGP events across Europe over the summer.
  - Michelle McManus presents her final weekday afternoon show for BBC Radio Scotland following a schedule change. Grant Stott will present the show from Mondays to Thursdays from the following week, with Arlene Stuart presenting on Fridays.
- 29 May – Alexander Armstrong presents his final weekday morning show on Classic FM, having been the host of this slot for the past six years. He remains at the station to present a new Friday night programme called Classical Spotlight.

=== June ===
- 1 June –
  - Bethany Dawson joins LBC as Political Correspondent, providing maternity cover for Aggie Chambre.
  - Aled Jones begins presenting weekday mid-mornings on Classic FM as part of a schedule refresh for the station.
  - James Hall joins KISS to present evenings from Mondays to Thursdays.
- 4 June –
  - Bob Harris announces he is stepping down from his presenting duties with BBC Radio 2 after 56 years on air, due to ongoing health issues. Shaun Keaveny replaces him on Sounds of the 70s.
  - It is reported that Ofcom is to run tests on whether AI can be used to analyse news content.
- 6 June –
  - Capital's annual Summertime Ball event will take place at Wembley Stadium.
  - Kéllé Bryan joins Magic Soul to present a Saturday morning show.
- 8 June –
  - Lemar begins presenting weekday lunchtimes on Magic Soul, in addition to his Sunday morning programme.
  - Russ Williams takes over the weekday drivetime show on Track Radio while regular presenter Mark Pougatch is away covering the 2026 FIFA World Cup.
- 10 June – Holland & Barrett is announced as the new partner of Capital Breakfast.
- 12 June –
  - Sir Ian Cheshire is appointed Chair of Ofcom.
  - Sara Cox presents her final drivetime show for Radio 2 before taking a break ahead of taking over the breakfast show later in the year. The show will be covered by Mark Goodier, Ellie Taylor and Alex Jones before a new permanent presenter is announced.
- 13 June – Among those from the world of broadcasting to be recognised in the 2026 Birthday Honours are Carl Cox (OBE), Cerys Matthews (OBE), George Bowie (MBE), Judge Jules (MBE), and Anneka Rice (MBE).
- 15 June – Former BBC Radio 1 newsreader Rod McKenzie joins 80s Heaven to present weekly shows on Monday and Friday afternoons.
- 16 June – Radio 2 Breakfast Show newsreader Tina Daheley announces she is leaving the programme after seven years.
- 18 June – BBC Radio 2 confirms that Ellie Brennan and Matt Carter will join Sara Cox on her new breakfast show, with Brennan providing travel updates and Carter reading the news.
- 26 June –
  - BBC Radio 2 and BBC 1Xtra presenter Trevor Nelson announces he is taking a break from broadcasting due to "health issues".
  - Heart listener Joy Haythorne becomes the winner of the station's Make Me a Millionaire.
- 27 June –
  - At 1am, at the end of the day's broadcasting for the 26th, BBC Radio 4 stops broadcasting on long wave and a retune loop then begins playing on 198 kHz, continuing until its permanent switch-off on 30 June.
  - A campaign to preserve the Droitwich Transmitting Station begins as the transmitter is expected to stop all radio transmissions in the next year or so when the two services it still transmits – BBC Radio 5 Live and TalkSport – are expected to end their MW broadcasts.
- 29 June – Clara Amfo covers Trevor Nelson's BBC Radio 2 afternoon show, while Melvin Odoom covers The Good Groove.
- 30 June – At just after 12noon, 198 kHz long wave falls silent, having broadcast a retune loop for BBC Radio 4 for the previous 83 hours.

=== July ===
- 3 July –
  - Sam Darlaston joins BBC Radio 1 to present Friday Early Breakfast throughout July.
  - Presenter Jo Good returns to her late night BBC Local Radio show two weeks after she was involved in the Bedford train collision.
- 4 July –
  - BBC Radio 2 airs the programme Graham and Madonna a week after its debut on BBC One.
  - Lyca Radio provides exclusive coverage of Hariharan's concert at the Royal Festival Hall.
- 5 July – Chris McCausland joins Absolute Radio to present a weekly Sunday morning show alongside fellow comedian Jon Long.
- 6 July –
  - Sara Cox presents her first breakfast show on Radio 2.
  - DJ Spoony covers Trevor Nelson's BBC Radio 2 afternoon show.
  - Rob Howard joins Hits Radio to present a weekday evening show.
  - Sparky (real name Mark Colerangle) takes over the BBC Radio Nottingham breakfast show as its new presenter.
  - James O'Brien's programme on LBC is covered by a selection of MPs while he is on holiday. The line up is Angela Rayner (6 July), Wes Streeting (7 July), Jess Phillips (8 July), Robert Jenrick (9 July) and Karl Turner (10 July).
- 8 July – Emma Bunton presents a special evening show to celebrate the Spice Girls on the 30th anniversary of the release of their first single, "Wannabe".
- 9 July – Sophie, Duchess of Edinburgh makes a surprise cameo appearance on Radio 4's The Archers.
- 11 July – Sounds of the 80s and Sounds of the 90s on BBC Radio 2 move to earlier times of 6pm and 8pm respectively.
- 15 July – Radio 1 announces that Rickie Haywood-Williams and Melvin Odoom will both leave the station after 7 years, with Jeremiah Asiamah replacing them on the mid-morning Live Lounge slot from September. Other changes include Charley Marlowe co-hosting Radio 1's Group Chat from Fridays to Sundays with Vicky Hawkesworth, replacing Nat O'Leary, and The Official Chart: First Look becoming a stand-alone programme on Sundays, hosted by Lauren Layfield live from Birmingham. Danny Mylo and Rosie Madison will take over the early breakfast show from Dean McCullough, Emil Franchi will replace James Cusack on weekend breakfast and GK Barry will join to present a series of Radio 1 shows. Radio 1's Life Hacks will be co-hosted by Shanequa Paris and Ore Olukoga on Sunday evenings. The station's weekend early breakfast show will be presented by rising radio DJs as Swarzy leaves the station.
- 19 July – talkSPORT secures the radio broadcasting rights to coverage of the 2026 Commonwealth Games, the first commercial station in the UK to secure broadcasting rights to a Commonwealth Games event.
- 20 July – Steve and Karen begin presenting breakfast on Hits Radio 90s and Hits Radio 00s.
- 28 July – Naga Munchetty announces she is leaving BBC Breakfast to take up a presenting role on BBC Radio 5 Live Breakfast, starting in January 2027.
- 30 July –
  - It is announced that Charlie Tee will join BBC Radio 1 Dance to present afternoons as part of a schedule refresh later in the year.
  - Boom Radio launches the one-day pop-up station Boom 66 to celebrate the 60th anniversary of England's 1966 World Cup final victory over West Germany. As well as being available online, Boom 66 is also aired on small-scale DAB multiplexes in the West of England.
- 31 July –
  - Two more of BBC Radio 5 Live's MW transmitters, covering Redruth and Folkestone, closed.
  - The Radio Imaging Library (TRIL), a European radio imaging library, is launched in the UK through a partnership between TM Studios and Dutch audio company Capital of Media.

=== August ===
- 2 August – Rob Underwood joins Lincs Sound to present Sunday evenings.
- 3 August – The BBC confirms that Tony Livesey has left BBC Radio 5 Live after 16 years.
- 5 August – Lucy Horobin joins BBC Radio Berkshire to present weekday mid-mornings.
- 6 August –
  - A group of 18 media organisations is urging the government to reject BBC proposals to introduce advertising on its podcasts and audio content in the UK.
  - RAJAR figures for the second quarter of 2026 indicate that commercial radio had a weekly audience of 40.2 million, compared to 30.9 million for the BBC. The figures represent a gradual increase for commercial stations and a gradual decline for the BBC.
  - Charmaine Frankis becomes the new presenter of Voices of Africa on Voice FM 103.9, succeeding Victoria Ugwoeme, who launched the programme as Southampton's first show dedicated to African music in 2022.
- 10 August –
  - Ofcom finds that Radio Caroline breached its rules after accidentally broadcasting a message announcing the death of King Charles III on 19 May.
  - NLive Radio, which has been funded by the University of Northampton since going on air, launches a fundraising appeal as it prepares to become an independent community organisation.
- 11 August –
  - It is confirmed that Riverside Radio will provide coverage of AFC Wimbledon games throughout the 2026–27 football season.
  - Ouse Valley Radio, which was off air for six weeks following the demolition of its transmission building, resumes broadcasting on 104FM after relocating its transmitter to a new site.
- 13 August – Grampian Hospital Radio celebrates receiving The King's Award for Voluntary Service.
- 14 August – Gateway 97.8 is recognised with The Princess Royal Training Award for the third time.
- 20 August –
  - BBC Radio 2 presenter Trevor Nelson reveals he stepped away from broadcasting earlier in the year to undergo surgery for a brain tumour, which he says has gone "incredibly well".
  - Radio Caroline welcomes back Stevie Gordon, who last broadcast on the station in 1980, as the MV Mi Amigo began sinking while he was on air.
  - It is announced that BBC Local Radio will provide live coverage of every English Football League match throughout the 2026–27 season.
- 26 August – Launch of the Radio Scotland Sessions, a monthly live music strand on the BBC Radio Scotland afternoon show.
- 28 August – Clyde 1 broadcasts live from its new studios at 100 Queen Street, Glasgow, for the very first time, having left its previous studios at Clydebank the same day.

=== September ===
- 1 September –
  - Lyca Radio expands to provide full DAB coverage in Birmingham.
  - Nation Broadcasting acquires More Radio and Isle of Wight Radio to increase its coverage in the south of England.
- 3 September – It is announced that actress and singer Samantha Barks will join Heart Musicals to present a Saturday afternoon show.
- 7 September –
  - Zoe Ball joins Greatest Hits Radio to present weekday afternoons, taking on the show previously presented by Kate Thornton. A twelve month sponsorship deal with BT Group is announced on the day of its launch.
  - Launch of The Big Welsh Breakfast on Nation Radio Wales, presented by Phil Hoyles and Angela Jay.
  - Charlie Hedges and Jeremiah Asiamah begin presenting the Live Lounge on Radio 1. Early breakfast on the station also relaunches with Danny Mylo and Rosie Madison.
  - Trevor Nelson begins a phased return to his radio shows, starting with his Radio 2 afternoon show for two days, then increasing a day each week until Monday 28 September, when he will begin a full week of presenting. He will also return to his BBC Radio 1Xtra show from 13 September.
- 8 September – Ofcom finds Staffordshire community station Vibe 1 in breach of its regulations after it failed to supply requested recordings of its programming.
- 9 September – After securing a licence to join DAB in Wakefield, Rhubarb Radio launches a fundraising appeal to secure equipment to facilitate the move.
- 10 September –
  - Jo Whiley presents a special edition of her Radio 2 show live from Stirling Tolbooth, in partnership with BBC Introducing.
  - Waitrose announce a 12-week sponsorship of "Something for the Weekend", an hour-long feature of Zoe Ball's Friday afternoon show on Greatest Hits Radio.
  - Lyca Radio announces plans to expand into West Yorkshire by launching on DAB in Leeds, Bradford and Huddersfield.
- 11–13 September – Radio 2 in the Park takes place at City Park, Stirling, having been rescheduled from between 7 and 9 August due to concerns about the potential impact on other events.
- 14 September – Mansfield 103.2 rebrands as Mansfield Radio.
- 18 September – Paul Oakenfold begins a 12-week residency on Virgin Radio with a Friday evening show.
- 22 September –
  - Heart Breakfast presenters Jamie Theakston and Amanda Holden announce Heart Christmas Live at the Royal Albert Hall in December.
  - Roy Noble announces he will step down from his BBC Radio Wales Sunday show in March 2027.
- 23 September – Global Radio announces plans for the launch of Radio Plus, a premium service that will allow listeners to hear ad free versions of their radio stations.
- 24 September –
  - BBC Local Radio proposes the merger of further programming, including a joint weekday late show produced with BBC Radio 5 Live that could begin from April 2027.
  - Boom Radio CEO Phil Riley confirms that Boom Rock will close at the end of September as the broadcaster invests £1m in an advertising campaign for its main station.
- 25 September –
  - BBC Director-General Matt Brittin says that some BBC radio and television channels may have to close as the broadcaster seeks to make £500m in savings.
  - Europe's Biggest Dance Show 2026 airs on BBC Radio 1 and other networks across Europe.
  - Heart Christmas returns for 2026.
- 26 September – BBC Radio 2 presenter Owain Wyn Evans announces plans to cycle through all four Home Nations to raise money for Children in Need.
- 28 September – It is announced that Angela Scanlon will present the Radio 2 Drivetime Show from November.
- 30 September –
  - BBC Radio 5 Live switches off its mediumwave transmitters in Exeter and Brighton.
  - It is reported that Eddy Temple-Morris has left Virgin Radio following the end of his show on Virgin Radio Legends.

=== October ===
- 1 October – Angel Radio increases its coverage by launching on a further 15 DAB multiplexes. The expansion is made possible following two significant legacies.
- 4 October –
  - BBC Radio 6 Music airs a newly revised version of the Pet Shop Boys' A Man from the Future, a work concerning Alan Turing, as part of Stuart Maconie's Freak Zone.
  - Kaye Adams and Shereen Nanjiani guest present Sunday Brunch on STV Radio.
  - Steve Jones joins Radio X to present a Sunday morning show.
- 7 October – BBC Radio 2 apologises after a production error led to presenter Melvin Odoom playing a tribute to musician George Benson after Radio 2's 11pm news on 5 October reported the death of composer George Fenton.
- 9 October – Global's radio stations have raised £4,576,707 for small charities across the UK in the thirteenth annual Make Some Noise appeal.
- 12–16 October – BBC Radio 4 airs a season of programmes under the banner "Winnie the Pooh at 100" to celebrate 100th anniversary of the A. A. Milne character, with programmes introduced by Queen Camilla.
- 13 October – Plans for a new recording studio for The Archers are shelved by the BBC as part of cost-cutting measures.
- 16 October –
  - Global launches Classic FM Christmas.
  - Horizon Radio wins Ofcom approval to change how it describes its Milton Keynes community audience.
- 20 October –
  - It is announced that BBC Radio 4 Extra will close as a linear services in Spring 2027, and become an online service as the BBC makes £500m of savings.
  - It is announced that Graham Torrington will join Broadland Radio to present The Evening Retreat from 7pm–10pm from Sundays to Thursdays.
- 26 October – It is reported that Communicorp are in the process of acquiring Radio Essex.

=== November ===
- 3 November –
  - Rhuanedd Richards is confirmed as Director of BBC Nations.
  - LBC and The News Agents team present coverage of the 2026 United States elections.
- 6 November – BBC 1Xtra launches the first dedicated rap chart, with the programme presented by Kenny Allstar.
- 7 November – Jodie Bryant presents Weekend Early Breakfast on Radio 1.
- 9 November – The News Agents podcast is added to Global's Plus service, with extra content available for paying listeners.
- 14 November – King Charles III appears as a guest on Sir Elton John's radio show, The Rocket Hour, in an edition recorded to mark the monarch's 78th birthday.
- 19 November –
  - Julia Hartley-Brewer presents her final programme on Talk Radio after fronting the mid-morning show since 2016.
  - Sound Digital is expanding its national DAB network with 32 additional transmitter sites, bringing its 30 radio services to more than 1.1 million extra households as well as improving reception across more than 950 miles of motorway, trunk and A roads in England, Scotland and Wales. Sound Digital says 18 of the new sites are already on air, with the remaining 14 to be added by Easter 2027.
- 20 November – Hits Radio Live 2026 will take place in Birmingham.
- 23 November – Alex Phillips succeeds Julia Hartley-Brewer as Talk Radio's mid-morning presenter from Mondays to Thursdays.
- Late November – The broadcasting of BBC Local Radio on MW will end when the final five stations still available on that waveband – BBC Radio Norfolk, BBC Radio Gloucestershire, BBC Radio Cumbria, BBC Radio Derby and BBC Radio Somerset – stop broadcasting on medium wave.

=== December ===
- 5 December – Luke Carr takes over Weekend Early Breakfast on Radio 1 as part of the rotating presenter slot.

== Station debuts ==
=== Terrestrial ===
- 6 January – STV Radio
- 9 March – Virgin Radio 90s
- 4 May – Track Radio
- 29 May – Devote Radio
- 1 June –
  - Rock and Goal
  - Westminster Waves
- 17 August – Isle of Wight Tourist Radio
- 1 September – Huddle Radio
- 4 October – Radio Wyvern Gold
- 15 October – Rewind Radio Retro
- November – GB Music Radio

=== Online ===
- 31 January – 80s Heaven
- 17 May – Comedy UK
- 22 July – BBC Radio 6 Indie Forever
- 16 October – Classic FM Christmas

== Small-scale multiplex switch-ons ==
- 2 February – Bournemouth and Boscombe
- 3 February – Ayrshire and West Renfrewshire
- 14 February – Chelmsford
- 4 March – East Devon
- 20 March – Halifax
- 18 April – Isle of Wight
- 3 May – Craven, Wharfedale and the Worth Valley
- 16 July – Walsall
- August – Lanarkshire

== Closing this year ==
Date	Channel
31 March	BBC Radio Guernsey on MW.
31 March	BBC Radio Jersey on MW.
12 May	Ocean City Radio
31 May	Wigan One
27 June	BBC Radio 4 on LW.
21 July	Heartland FM
September	Boom Rock

== Programme debuts ==
- 1 January – Tony Blackburn's Sounds of Soul on BBC Radio 2.
- 6 February – Classical Love Themes with Dawn O'Porter, a four-part series looking at love through classical music, on Classic FM.
- 12 February – Catholic Celebs, a monthly series presented by Edward Adoo, on Radio Maria England.
- 3–5 April – Totally Outrageous with Tom Allen, a three-part series in which Tom Allen explores the larger than life figures in classical music, on Classic FM.
- 4 April – Key Changes: Radio 3's Essential History of Classical Music, a weekly series exploring turning points in classical music history, presented by Gillian Moore, on BBC Radio 3.
- 25 April–1 August – The World Cup of TV Sports Themes debuts as part of Saturday Breakfast with Dermot O' Leary on BBC Radio 2.
- 6 May – Malcolm's Musicals and Movies, a programme focussed on stage and screen music presented by Malcolm Prince, on Boom Radio.
- 5 July – The Chris McCausland Show on Absolute Radio.
- 6 July – The Sara Cox Breakfast Show on BBC Radio 2.

== Podcast debuts ==
- 4 February – Moving Minds, a mental health podcast with Gemma Oaten, from Hull Trains.
- 12 February – The Interface, a weekly technology podcast presented by Germain, Karen Hao and Nicky Woolf, on BBC Sounds.
- 13 February – Life Without, a ten-part series presented by Alan Davies, on BBC Radio 4.
- 16 February – Up to Speed, a twice-weekly Formula One podcast presented by Will Buxton, Naomi Schiff, David Coulthard and Jolie Sharpe, from Global Player.
- 3 March – Don't Say a Word, a weekly podcast presented by Nicky Campbell that investigates how language, cultural norms and public expectations are changing, on BBC Sounds.
- 4 March – Matt and Mollie's Novel Idea, a whodunit podcast presented by Matt Edmondson and Mollie King, on BBC Sounds.
- 23 April – Why Are You More Successful Than Me?, a weekly podcast presented by Richard Bacon looking at what drives success.
- 1 May – Learn Cornish, a 12-part weekly series presented by Danni Diston, on BBC Sounds.
- 11 June –
  - The Andrew Neil Report, a weekly current affairs podcast presented by Andrew Neil, from News UK.
  - The Prenup with Molly Rainford and Tyler West, a relationship podcast, from Bauer Media Audio UK.
- 1 September – The Early Cancer Diagnosis Podcast, a four-part series to help people recognise the early signs of cancer and seek help, presented by Laura Rawlings and Patrick Hart, from BCfm.
- 11 September – Tackling the Trades with Marlie Packer and Steph Leese, a fortnightly podcast exploring experiences of tradeswomen, from Fix Radio.

== Continuing radio programmes ==
These programmes are still running as of 2026. They are listed by the year they were first broadcast.

=== 1940s ===
- Desert Island Discs (started 1942)
- Woman's Hour (started 1946)
- A Book at Bedtime (started 1949)

=== 1950s ===
- The Archers (started 1950)
- Pick of the Pops (started 1955)
- The Today Programme (started 1957)

=== 1960s ===
- Farming Today (started 1960)
- In Touch (started 1961)
- The World at One (started 1965)
- The Official Chart (started 1967)
- Just a Minute (started 1967)
- The Living World (started 1968)

=== 1970s ===
- PM (started 1970)
- Start the Week (started 1970)
- You and Yours (started 1970)
- I'm Sorry I Haven't a Clue (started 1972)
- Newsbeat (started 1973)
- File on 4 (started 1977)
- Money Box (started 1977)
- The News Quiz (started 1977)
- Feedback (started 1979)
- The Food Programme (started 1979)
- Science in Action (started 1979)

=== 1980s ===
- In Business (started 1983)
- Sounds of the 60s (started 1983)
- Loose Ends (started 1986)

=== 1990s ===
- The Moral Maze (started 1990)
- Essential Selection (started 1991)
- Night Waves (started 1992)
- Essential Mix (started 1993)
- Up All Night (started 1994)
- Wake Up to Money (started 1994)
- Private Passions (started 1995)
- In Our Time (started 1998)
- PopMaster (started 1998)
- The Now Show (started 1998)

=== 2000s ===
- BBC Radio 2 Folk Awards (started 2000)
- Sounds of the 70s (2000–2008, resumed 2009)
- Dead Ringers (2000–2007, resumed 2014)
- A Kist o Wurds (started 2002)
- Fighting Talk (started 2003)
- Jeremy Vine (started 2003)
- The Chris Moyles Show (2004–2012, resumed 2015)
- Elaine Paige on Sunday (started 2004)
- The Bottom Line (started 2006)
- The Unbelievable Truth (started 2006)
- Radcliffe & Maconie (started 2007)
- The Media Show (started 2008)
- Newsjack (started 2009)

=== 2010s ===
- The Third Degree (started 2011)
- BBC Radio 1's Dance Anthems (started 2012)
- Sounds of the 80s (started 2013)
- Question Time Extra Time (started 2013)
- The Show What You Wrote (started 2013)
- Inside Science (started 2013)
- Friday Sports Panel (started 2014)
- Stumped (started 2015)
- You, Me and the Big C (started 2018)
- Radio 1's Party Anthems (started 2019)

=== 2020s ===
- Frank Skinner's Poetry Podcast (started 2020)
- Newscast (started 2020)
- Sounds of the 90s (started 2020)
- Life Changes (started 2021)
- Romesh Ranganathan: For The Love of Hip Hop (started 2021)
- The News Agents (started 2022)
- Ten to the Top (started 2023)
- Love Songs with Michael Ball (started 2024)
- Radio 2's The Week-est Link (started 2024)
- BBC Local Radio's The Late Show (started 2025)
- Tony Blackburn's Sounds of Soul (started 2026)
- The World Cup of TV Sports Themes (started 2026)

== Ending this year ==
- 28 February –
  - America's Greatest Hits (2020–2026)
  - The Kaye Adams Morning Show
- 24 March – The Scott Mills Breakfast Show (2025–2026)

== Deaths ==
- 2 January – Jenny Collins, 83, broadcaster and producer (BBC Radio Merseyside). (death announced on this date)
- 25 January – Sir Mark Tully, 90, BBC India correspondent.
- 27 January – Nigel Ogden, 71, theatre organist.
- 3 February – Richard Nankivell, 75, presenter (BFBS, BBC Radio Cumbria). (death announced on this date)
- 6 February – Phil Taylor, radio presenter (BBC Radio Jersey). (death announced on this date)
- 12 March – Dame Jenni Murray, 75, English journalist and broadcaster (Woman's Hour).
- 19 March – Dave Jamieson, 76, broadcaster (Radio Clyde, Radio Tees, BRMB, Mercia Sound, Boom Radio). (death announced on this date)
- 30 March – James Stannage, 76, British radio talk show host, cancer.
- 16 April – Andy Kershaw, 66, English broadcaster and radio DJ (BBC Radio 1), cancer.
- 21 May
  - Matthew Biggs, 65, British radio personality (Gardeners' Question Time), bowel cancer.
  - Judith Chalmers, 90, English broadcast presenter.
- 23 May – Emma Britton, radio presenter (BBC Radio Somerset, BBC Radio Bristol). (death announced on this date)
- 13 June – Roger Cook, 83, journalist and presenter (The World At One, The World This Weekend, Checkpoint), cancer.
- 21 June – Andrew Evans, 57, journalist and producer (BBC Radio Leeds).
- 8 July – Bonnie Tyler, 75, Welsh singer.
- 9 July – Patricia Greene, 95, actress (The Archers).
- 18 July – Edward Stourton, 68, BBC radio news presenter, prostate cancer.
- 25 July – Bill Oddie, 85, comedy writer-performer, songwriter and birder (I'm Sorry, I'll Read That Again).
- 21 September - Clive Roslin, 92, English broadcaster (LBC, BBC Radio 4).
- 26 September – Tony Currie, 74, Scottish broadcaster (Radio Clyde), tonsil cancer.
- 25 October – Steve Roberts, 75, radio presenter and sports commentator (BBC Radio Merseyside). (death reported on this date)

== See also ==
- 2026 in the United Kingdom
- 2026 in British music
- 2026 in British television
- List of British films of 2026
