= Nicola Heywood-Thomas =

Welsh broadcaster (1955–2023)

- Born: Nicola Anne Heywood-Thomas; 17 May 1955; Cardigan, Ceredigion, Wales
- Died: 6 April 2023 (aged 67); Cardiff, Wales
- Occupation: Newsreader
- Years active: 1984–2023
- Notable credit(s): HTV Wales News; BBC Wales Today
- Spouse: Grahame Lloyd (m. 1986)
- Children: 3

Nicola Anne Heywood-Thomas (17 May 1955 – 6 April 2023) was a Welsh broadcaster and television news journalist, who worked both for BBC Radio Wales and HTV, where she spent 18 years as a news presenter.

She was born in Cardigan but grew up in Manchester and Durham, County Durham, England.

Heywood-Thomas joined BBC Radio Wales straight from university, and later presented the station's arts programme, Radio Wales Arts Show, for 25 years. She was also a sub-editor, presenter and reporter for BBC Wales Today, although she is better remembered for her time with HTV. She was the recipient of a BAFTA Cymru Award. She made her final radio appearance in February 2023, and was undergoing chemotherapy at the time of her death. Heywood-Thomas died on 6 April 2023, at the age of 67. She was survived by her three children.
