= Matthew Biggs =

British radio presenter and gardener (1960–2026)

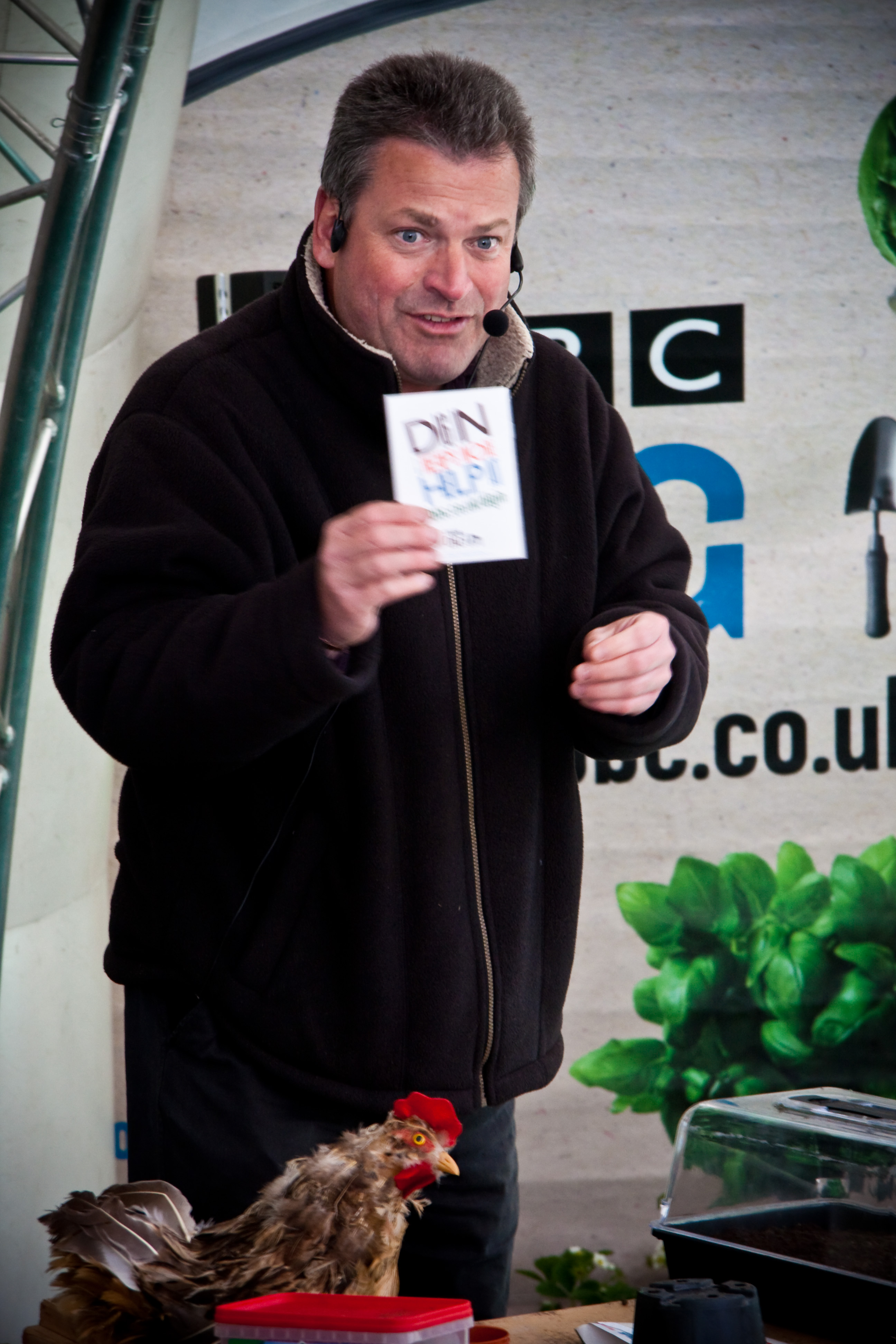
Biggs in 2010

Matthew John Biggs VMH (2 June 1960 – 21 May 2026) was a British radio personality and gardener, best known for his appearances on the long running BBC Radio 4 programme Gardeners' Question Time. He was a professional gardener for over 25 years, after studying at Pershore College of Horticulture and the Royal Botanic Gardens, Kew.

== Life and career ==
Matthew John Biggs was born in Leicester, England on 2 June 1960.

His first appearance on television was on Channel 4's Garden Club. He directed the long-running Grass Roots programme for ITV. Biggs was a contributor to BBC Gardeners' World magazine and blogged on Matthew Biggs Gardening Diary.

Biggs lived in Flamstead, Hertfordshire, and was a member of the Christadelphian Church.

In May 2026, Biggs was awarded the Victoria Medal of Honour (VMH), the highest honour bestowed by the Royal Horticultural Society.

Biggs died from bowel cancer on 21 May 2026, aged 65. An emotional special episode of GQT, A Tribute to Matthew Biggs has colleagues and admirers celebrating their friend’s achievements.
