= James Cridland =

Radio and podcast industry commentator

James Cridland is an Australian-based radio and podcast industry commentator, consultant and writer. He is the founder and editor of Podnews, a daily podcast industry newsletter, and works in radio broadcasting, digital audio strategy, podcasting, and hybrid radio technologies.

Cridland began working in radio in 1989 and has held roles in broadcasting, digital media, and technology strategy. He worked for Virgin Radio in the United Kingdom, where he led digital initiatives including the launch of a mobile streaming application for the station and the development of podcasting projects. During his tenure, Virgin Radio's digital team received two Webby Awards in 2005.

In 2007, Cridland joined the British Broadcasting Corporation (BBC), where he worked on the corporation's digital audio services. He was involved in projects to improve the quality of the BBC's online radio streams and contributed to the redevelopment of programme websites for television and radio.

Cridland was a founding participant in the development of RadioDNS, an open standard that links broadcast radio with internet-delivered content. He has also contributed to the Podcasting 2.0 initiative, including work on the podcast location tag specification.

Following his BBC career, Cridland worked as an independent consultant and advisor for broadcasters, technology companies and media organisations in Europe, North America, Asia and Australia. His clients and advisory roles have included Pure, Frontier Silicon, talkSPORT, the Australian Broadcasting Corporation, podcast hosting company Captivate , The Podcast Show London and Eurowaves.

In 2017, Cridland founded Podnews, a daily newsletter covering developments in the podcast industry.

== Honours and awards ==
- International Impact Award, The Podcast Academy (2025), inaugural recipient.
- Podcast Hall of Fame inductee (2026).
- Honorary Life Member, Student Radio Association.
- Associate Member, International Academy of Digital Arts and Sciences.
- Two Webby Awards (2005) as part of Virgin Radio's digital team.
