= Clare Foges =

Speechwriter to David Cameron

Clare Foges OBE is a columnist for The Times, and a weekend presenter on LBC radio. She is an author of children's books. She worked as a speechwriter for David Cameron 2010-15 in Downing Street. She previously worked full time on Boris Johnson 2008, mayoral campaign and initially joined his administration. In 2006, she worked for Sir John Hayes MP at his office in Westminster. She has a Masters degree in Poetry and has experience of running a business, selling her own clothing and jewellery designs.

== Early life ==
In the mid-2000s, Foges responded to an advertisement seeking an ice cream seller. Subsequently, for a period, she divided her time between serving ice cream from a van in Guildford for four days a week, and working at the Westminster office of MP John Hayes for the remaining three days. After discontinuing her role as an ice cream vendor, she began to work on Boris Johnson's campaign to become Mayor of London. Later, she served in his administration at City Hall.

In 2008, she became a member of David Cameron's team as a speechwriter.

== Personal life ==
Foges is married to Sean and they have four children.

== Publications ==
Foges has written several books for children.

#	Title	Author	Illustrator	Publication year	Publisher	Edition	Available Formats	Language
1	Veg Patch Party	Clare Foges	Al Murphy	2020	Faber and Faber, London	Main	eBook, print book	English
2	Kitchen Disco	Clare Foges	Al Murphy	2017	Faber and Faber Limited, London		Print book, eBook	English
3	Bathroom Boogie	Clare Foges	Al Murphy	2017	Faber & Faber, London		Print book	English
