= Aiir =

American Technology Company

- Logo used from 2015 to present.
- Formerly: G Media
- Company type: Privately held company
- Industry: Software
- Founded: Sheffield, United Kingdom (2003)
- Founders: Ricki Lee and Gav Richards
- Headquarters: New York City, United States of America
- Area served: Global
- Services: Websites, Mobile Apps, Content Management Systems, SMS Solutions, Radioplayer, Alexa Skills
- Owner: Ricki Lee and Gav Richards
- Website: aiir.com

Aiir is a technology company headquartered in New York City, that provides online services and products to broadcast radio stations.

Founded in the United Kingdom, Aiir operates services for radio stations worldwide including website content management and hosting, mobile applications for iOS and Android, and studio interaction. Companies using their platform include Celador, Wireless Group Bauer Radio, Lincs FM Group, Jazz FM, and Quidem.

The company was founded in 2003 by Ricki Lee and Gav Richards, both former radio professionals.

In 2009, Aiir became the preferred provider to Independent Radio News in delivering its digital content to UK radio stations. During 2010 and early 2011 the company also played part in the launch of the UK Radioplayer and developed the first independent radio station player console for Juice 107.2 in Brighton. In 2013 they were commissioned to produce the 3rd iteration of the Radioplayer product, which is now in use worldwide.

In 2015, the company and platform rebranded from G Media to Aiir.

It was announced on April 27, 2016 that the company had signed a deal with Premiere Networks for the US and international distribution.

The company previously had offices in Sheffield, UK, and in New York City, US, but since January 2017 has considered itself a distributed company; all employees are remote workers.

In December 2020, the company announced Showhost, a new app for helping to prepare radio shows and podcasts. It is their first product not directly marketed at radio stations.

On November 1, 2022, it was announced the company was merging with broadcast automation software company PlayoutONE.

On June 24, 2024, it was announced the company had acquired audio AI tool RadioNewsAI.
