= Cross Counties Radio =

Radio station in England

Cross Counties Radio is a registered trademark and a radio station broadcasting from Magna Park, Lutterworth in Leicestershire, England. The radio station is licensed by Ofcom to broadcast on 92 FM (Magna Park, Lutterworth and the surrounding towns and villages) and 95.4 FM (Blaby and the surrounding towns and villages) on the VHF waveband. The 92 FM transmitter officially launched on 31 August 2020 and the 95.4 FM relay officially launched on 1 April 2022. Both transmitters carry the same audio source which is also simulcast online on Cross Counties Radio One which is available on smart speakers, Tunein radio, smart phone and the radio stations website www.crosscountiesradio.co.uk

However the radio station was originally broadcast from Sketchley Grange, Burbage on 87.7 FM on 6 June 1996. A second trial broadcast licence issued by the Radio Authority commenced on 27 November 1996 from Nuneaton on 106.0 FM. The transmitter was located on the roof of the George Eliot Hospital, linked to the studio on Newtown Road by UHF. A third trial broadcast issued by the Radio Authority took place in 1999 on 107.4 FM from the same studio and transmitter site previously used. The station has since been operational via various platforms including the internet where the radio stations operator (The Sunflower Community Radio Association) which manages Cross Counties Radio Limited has three other on-line radio stations with the same format of local and national news, but performs different music aimed at an audience that require a more relaxed mix of music (Cross Counties Radio 2) or a station totally dedicated to performing royalty free and unsigned music (Cross Counties Radio 3).

The radio station's VHF transmitter broadcasting on 92 FM is on the top of the tallest building at Magna Park, Lutterworth, next to the point where the counties of Leicestershire, Northamptonshire and Warwickshire meet.

Content broadcast by the station mixes local content broadcast live from studios at Magna Park, Lutterworth and also contains music with news from Sky News Radio at the top of the hour.
