= PopMaster =

UK radio quiz

PopMaster (briefly known as Celebrity PopMaster from 2007 to 2008) is a popular music radio quiz in the United Kingdom. Between February 1998 and March 2023, the quiz was part of the weekday morning Ken Bruce Show on BBC Radio 2; since April 2023, it has aired on Greatest Hits Radio. The questions were originally devised by radio producer and music collector Phil "The Collector" Swern, but are now written by Neil Myners and Simon Bray.

== Structure ==
Two contestants play against each other for the chance to win a prize. Until May 2022, the prize was a DAB digital radio but this changed to either Bluetooth headphones or a smart speaker from June 2022. Each contestant is asked ten questions based on popular music from the 1950s through to the present day. Correct answers to the questions are worth three points, other than for the third, sixth and ninth "bonus" questions on a topic chosen by the contestant, from two options offered by the host prior to the start of the quiz. The bonus questions involve listening to a brief piece of music and, if answered correctly, are worth six points. There is, therefore, a maximum total of 39 points on offer.

If a contestant has scored no points prior to their final three-point question, Bruce will sometimes help them with the question if required. However, during one December 2021 edition when Scott Mills was sitting in for Bruce, a contestant failed to answer a single question correctly and scored no points. Also, in a June 2021 edition, the first contestant answered only one question correctly leaving Bruce unable to help the second contestant score as they also failed to answer any questions correctly.

The winning contestant then goes on to play "Three-in-Ten". In this part of the quiz, they have ten seconds to name three UK Singles Chart hits for a particular artist or group named by Bruce. If successful, they win the main prize; if not, they win a PopMaster board game (previously a pair of Bluetooth headphones). However, if a contestant scores 39 points in the main quiz, they automatically win a smart speaker and the losing contestant plays the Three-in-Ten instead. Should both contestants score the same number of points, and the score is less than the maximum, a tie-break is used to decide who will play Three-in-Ten.

A "One Year Out" t-shirt is given to the losing contestant; it is so named because when answering "Name the Year" type questions, contestants are very often just one year out, causing Bruce to exclaim "One year out!". These t-shirts are often heard to be accepted by contestants as a desirable consolation.

When Bruce was on holiday, PopMaster continued with stand-in presenters; these have included Alex Lester, Stuart Maconie, Michael Ball, Claudia Winkleman, Simon Mayo, Richard Allinson, Aled Jones, Zoe Ball, Fearne Cotton, Sara Cox, Trevor Nelson, Gary Davies, Jo Whiley, Scott Mills and DJ Spoony on Radio 2, with Mark Goodier and Richard Allinson on Greatest Hits Radio.

On occasions when Ken was unable to get to the studio on time, a substitute host would play in a pre-recorded edition of Celebrity PopMaster – editions were played with Tony Hadley on 11 June 2025 and Rob Brydon on 1 July 2025.

=== Champions League PopMaster ===
At the end of the year, the best contestants (those who score 39 points, or 36 points and also win the "Three-in-Ten") return for Champions League PopMaster; the structure of which is different to the standard quiz. The contestants start with their original score from their first appearance and then proceed to answer ten questions, which are worth their ordinal values – i.e. question one is worth one point, question two is worth two points and so on. The contestants still choose a bonus subject, but this is only worth its value in the order of the questions. The score is then added to their original score and the two highest-scoring contestants return for a final to determine the year's champion.

As of the quiz's move to Greatest Hits Radio, all Champions League PopMaster contestants also receive the "One Year Out" t-shirt and a PopMaster board game (and, as of 2024, a PopMaster quiz book); the two finalists receive a commemorative trophy, with the overall champion also receiving a year's worth of concert tickets.

== Suspension and celebrity version ==
Despite never having been implicated, PopMaster was suspended for one day on 19 July 2007, in line with the BBC's blanket ban on television and radio competitions following several phone-in scandals. The following day, PopMaster returned without prizes or public entry, with the contestants consisting of celebrities and BBC staff. Between 20 July 2007 and 18 January 2008, when the quiz was played with celebrity contestants, no prizes were awarded and Three-in-Ten was not held.

It was rumoured that members of the public would be able to play again before Christmas 2007, though this did not happen. On 30 December 2007, it was announced that the quiz would be one of the first BBC phone-in competitions to return in January 2008; it recommenced on 21 January. New background music, with dramatic, orchestral and guitar-based jingles for the quiz, were introduced on the same day. The contestant application procedure reverted to the original write-in method, but now prospective contestants are invited on the day. Due to concerns over the spread of COVID-19, potential contestants have applied by email since 2020.

On 28 May 2010, Bruce hosted a special Eurovision Song Contest celebrity edition of the quiz, live from Oslo, Norway. Eurovision commentator for BBC Three, Paddy O'Connell, took on the author of The Eurovision Song Contest – The Official History, John Kennedy O'Connor, to answer questions on the contest, with O'Connor winning. On 25 May 2012, a second Eurovision celebrity edition of the quiz was hosted live from Baku, Azerbaijan; the BBC's Moscow correspondent, Steve Rosenberg, narrowly lost to O'Connor.

A third Eurovision Popmaster was held live on 17 May 2013 from Malmö, Sweden, on the eve of the 2013 contest. Bruce competed against Paddy O'Connell, with John Kennedy O'Connor chairing the quiz.

On Bank Holiday Monday, 25 May 2020, Bruce hosted an All-Day tournament of the quiz between 7:30am and 5:30pm, where celebrities played against members of the public. There were eight heats, two semi-finals and a grand final. For this version, contestants could pick up the normal 39 points, with an extra five being awarded for successfully completing the Three-in-Ten round. Wlodziu Kula-Przezwanski won the contest. This format returned again on 31 May 2021; Jenny Ryan from The Chase was crowned the winner.

On 28 May 2021, in the lead-up to the broadcast of a documentary about the quiz called One Year Out: The PopMaster Story, the first ever contestants from February 1998 returned to play a rematch.

== PopMaster TV ==
Shortly after moving to Greatest Hits Radio, it was announced in April 2023 that a televised version of PopMaster, titled PopMaster TV, had been commissioned by Channel 4 to air on its More4 channel. A six-episode series aired from 26 June 2023, with the grand final on 3 July 2023, featuring winners from each of the daily episodes broadcast the week before.

Bruce reprised his role as presenter, and two players played the regular PopMaster game at the end of the hour, after three other contestants had been knocked out in previous rounds, all devised for the TV series. The series was produced by 12 Yard and was recorded at BBC Pacific Quay, Glasgow.

The second series premiered on 13 May 2024 and started with two celebrity specials; the series continued with regular episodes from 20 May 2024.

In October 2024, PopMaster TV was recommissioned for two more series.

The third series premiered on 17 December 2024, with a celebrity DJ special, followed by a celebrity special on 7 January 2025. The regular series began on 14 January and ran for eight heats, with the grand final on 11 March 2025.

The fourth series premiered on 23 June 2025 and ran for eight heats, with the grand final on 3 July 2025.

In March 2026, PopMaster TV was again recommissioned for two more series.

The fifth series premiered on 17 August 2026, with a celebrity special. The regular series began on 18 August 2026.

Grand final winners:

- Series 1 – Vicky Richardson
- Series 2 – Kuresh Hosseini
- Series 3 – David Tiplady
- Series 4 – David Gill
- Series 5 – Frankie Fanko

== Online ==
An interactive version of PopMaster was launched on 1 March 2010. The game could be played on the Radio 2 web and mobile sites until 3 March 2023. The game featured text, image, sound and video questions; scores are determined by how quickly the player answers correctly. A voiceover from Ken Bruce features throughout the game and players can also challenge friends to beat their high scores; the maximum score possible is 39.

From 29 October 2018 until the quiz moved to Greatest Hits Radio, PopMaster was available as a podcast on BBC Sounds for thirty days after the original broadcast.

== Miscellaneous ==
PopMaster was parodied by comedian and BBC Radio 6 Music presenter Jon Holmes on his weekend show in the game Ken Bruce Master. The game is described thus: "On PopMaster, listeners have to answer questions about pop stars; on Ken Bruce Master, pop stars have to answer questions about Ken Bruce." Very surreal questions then follow, in the style of Chuck Norris facts. Many pop and rock stars have played the game for "no prizes whatsoever due to current compliance guidelines." At Christmas 2007, Ken Bruce himself participated and lost.

The format of PopMaster is similar to that of David Hamilton's Music Game, which ran on his Radio 2 show in the late 1970s and early to mid-1980s. In the late 1980s, the station largely moved away from pop music, so there was no such quiz on the station for some time.

BBC Radio 2 replaced PopMaster with a new daily quiz called Ten to the Top launched at the start of Gary Davies' interim period covering the morning show and continuing with Vernon Kay as its permanent host. While the winner gets the same top prize as in PopMaster, the runner up gets a Radio 2 mug.
