= Jo Good =

British broadcaster

Jo Good (born 28 November 1978) is a British broadcaster.

== Career ==
A radio 'anorak' since her early teens, Jo joined the radio industry straight out of school, aged 17. At this point she moved from Alnwick, Northumberland, to Manchester. Working first as a travel reporter, then a broadcast journalist, she started presenting solo shows at 20. She worked in the media industry for a decade before joining BBC 6 Music. Among her previous work is presenting on the music channel MTV, where she hosted The Dancefloor Chart. She has also presented the afternoon show on XFM. In summer 2012 she completed a degree in English literature at the University of Salford.

She left Radio X in 2017.

== Personal life ==
Jo Good lives in Manchester with her partner and two rescue dogs.
