= Heartland FM =

Community owned radio station in Pitlochry, Scotland

- Crieff, Scotland; Scotland
- Broadcast area: Perthshire
- Frequencies: 97.5 MHz (Pitlochry & Aberfeldy); 107.3 MHz (Crieff)

History
- First air date: 14 March 1992
- Last air date: 26 July 2026

Links
- Website: https://www.heartlandfm.co.uk

Heartland FM was a community owned radio station based in Crieff, broadcasting to the Perthshire area.

One of the longest serving community owned radio stations in Scotland, Heartland FM launched in 1992. The station covered the Perthshire area, with a focus on local programming, by drawing on members of the community to present programmes and provide technical backup. The station operated with a charitable status, governed by a board of trustees, and funded by a hybrid of grant and advertisement money.

In 2024, Heartland FM re-launched and extended its service to cover the whole of rural Perthshire for the first time. The station then served the towns, villages and hamlets of the area on 97.5 and 107.3 FM. 97.5 FM continues to serve the residents of Pitlochry, Aberfeldy and Highland Perthshire as it has for over 30 years. 107.3 FM introduced Heartland FM to a new audience with Crieff, Auchterarder and Lowland Perthshire served by a terrestrial local radio service on FM for the very first time.

== History ==
Heartland FM started broadcasting in 1992, when it was set up to serve the Highland Perthshire area which, at that time, did not have access to FM quality broadcasts, and only limited analogue television. Broadcasting on a part-time basis from the outset, the station later ran a full schedule every day of the week.

Since 2019, the station developed as part of a larger multimedia platform, which also supported IRIS, a digital community magazine; and a website which provides a daily news service.

In March 2023, Heartland FM scaled back its broadcast service due to financial issues, with paid station manager Alistair Smith exiting and the station returning to a purely volunteer-run operation.

In October 2023, Heartland FM announced its merger with a neighbouring station, Crieff-based Radio Earn, with the station's FM signal extending into the lowland Perthshire region for the first time.

Heartland FM announced its closure in July 2026, citing "a long journey trying to find a feasible business model." It subsequently surrendered its licence to Ofcom that month.

== Programming ==
Heartland FM broadcast a range of programming throughout the day and week, with a breakfast programme every morning, as well as afternoon and drive time slots. Among the daytime programming, the station also featured a range of specialist shows, focusing on country music, rock and roll, traditional Scottish music and Scottish political news.

== Awards ==
Heartland FM has been the recipient of numerous awards and nominations, including Best Radio Station 2012 at the Scottish New Music Awards.

The station also won the silver award for Community Show of the Year in 2019, and was nominated for Arts & Creative Radio of the Year in 2020, at the Community Radio Awards.

In 2021, Heartland FM won the silver award for Station of the Year at the Community Radio Awards, as well as the bronze award for Live Event or Outside Broadcast of the Year, in recognition of their coverage of the 2021 Scottish Parliament election. Journalist Ashleigh Keenan-Bryce won the gold award for Best Newcomer to Radio, while presenter Katherine Lilley won the silver award for Best Female Presenter.

In 2024, Heartland FM's Head of Production Lewis Ness was included in The Radio Academy '30 Under 30'. The list showcases 30 people under the age of 30 who have shown exceptional tenacity, talent and a proven trajectory in radio and audio.
