= The Show What You Wrote =

- Genre: Comedy show, entertainment
- Country of origin: United Kingdom
- Language(s): English
- Home station: BBC Radio 4
- Original release: 2013

The Show What You Wrote is a BBC Radio 4 comedy sketch show made entirely from material sent in by the show's listeners.

== See also ==
- You Wrote It, You Watch It
