= Timeline of Absolute Radio =

A timeline of notable events relating to Absolute Radio and its spin-off stations, and its predecessor Virgin 1215/Virgin Radio.

== Virgin Radio ==
=== 1990s ===
1990

- The Broadcasting Act 1990 paves the way for the launch of Independent National Radio (INR) stations in the United Kingdom. The Radio Authority is mandated to award three licences, awarding each licence to the highest cash bidder, providing that the applicant meets criteria set down in the Broadcasting Act.

1991

- October – The second Independent National Radio licence is advertised. It will broadcast on MW, using the 1197 kHz and 1215 kHz frequencies, which will be relinquished by BBC Radio 3.

1992

- 29 February – BBC Radio 3 stops broadcasting on 1197 kHz and 1215 kHz MW.
- April – The Radio Authority awards the second Independent National Radio licence to Independent Music Radio, a consortium jointly owned by TV-am and Virgin Communications. There had been four other applicants for the licence.

1993

- Ahead of its launch on MW, Virgin campaigns to broadcast nationally on FM and spends 1993 lobbying to broadcast on BBC Radio 4's FM frequencies.
- March – TV-am sells its stake in Virgin Radio to Apax Partners, JP Morgan Investment Corporation and Sir David Frost.
- 30 April – The station launches as Virgin 1215 at 12.15 pm on 30 April 1993. Richard Branson is the first voice to be heard, live from the Virgin Megastore in Manchester, with Richard Skinner the first voice back in the London studios. The first song to be played is a cover version of the Steppenwolf song Born to be Wild, recorded by Australian group INXS.
- 2 May – As part of its launch schedule, the first edition of Virgin 1215' album chart show is broadcast, airing at 4pm on Sundays, in direct competition with the charts shows broadcast on both BBC Radio 1 and commercial radio.
- July – Jonathan Coleman becomes Russ Williams breakfast show co-host. Also, Kevin Greening moves from weekend slots to the weekday afternoon show.
- December – Kevin Greening becomes the first presenter to leave Virgin 1215.
- Summer – Virgin 1215 begins broadcasting in stereo on the Astra 1A satellite on an audio sub-carrier of the Sky News channel.

1994

- January – Gary Davies joins the station to present the Sunday morning Classic Tracks show. Also Graham Dene moves to weekday afternoons and Gary King joins to take on weekend breakfast.
- Having been unsuccessful at trying to obtain BBC Radio 4's FM frequencies, the station tries to persuade The Radio Authority to allocate the recently available 105–108 MHz part of the FM waveband to a fourth INR licence as part of a renewed bid to broadcast nationally on FM.
- 29 June – Following its failure to persuade The Radio Authority to use 105–108 MHz FM for a new commercial national station, Virgin Radio applies for one of the new licenses to broadcast to London.
- 8 October – Virgin Radio is awarded one of the new London-wide FM licences.

1995

- 10 April – Virgin Radio starts broadcasting on FM in London. The station is a full simulcast of the national service apart from a 45-minute weekday early evening programme, presented initially by Rowland Rivron.
- April – To coincide with the launch of Virgin London, the national station is renamed as Virgin Radio.
- 3 December – Following a brief sabbatical, Gary Davies returns to take over the Sunday late show.

1996

- 7 March – Virgin Radio launches its first website.
- 15 March – Alan Freeman joins the station to present a new Friday night rock show.
- 3 August – Lynn Parsons joins the station to present the weekend early evening show.
- October – Richard Skinner, who presented the first show, leaves the station. Graham Dene replaces Richard as the presenter of the weekday morning show.

1997

- May – It is announced that Capital Radio has agreed to acquire Virgin Radio in an £87 million deal. Capital's plans included moving Virgin Radio from 1 Golden Square to Capital's Leicester Square building and splitting programming between the AM and FM services. The Radio Authority approved the acquisition, but Nigel Griffiths, the Consumer Affairs Minister, referred the takeover to the Monopolies and Mergers Commission (MMC). The MMC report into the takeover would not be issued until January 1998, and would recommend that the deal could only go ahead if Capital Gold was sold or Virgin's London FM licence was left out of the deal. The delay in approval of the Capital acquisition ultimately leads to the deal not going through.
- 26 September – Alan Freeman presents his final rock show for Virgin Radio.
- 13 October – Chris Evans rejoins the station to take over the breakfast show from Russ Williams who moves to Drivetime before being transferred to the mid-morning show in early 1998.
- 9 December – Chris Evans's media production company, Ginger Media Group, buys Virgin Radio from Richard Branson for £85m. Branson had planned to sell the station to Capital Radio, but Evans, who had not wanted to work for the station, launched a rival bid.

1998

- August – Virgin Radio launches a new Saturday afternoon football show called Rock 'n' Roll Football.
- 5 October – Virgin Radio starts simulcasts of the breakfast show on Sky One each morning for an hour between 7.30 and 8.30 am. When a track was played on the radio, viewers see the track's video at the same time.
- Lynn Parsons leaves.

1999

- January – Gary Davies takes over the weeknight late show.
- 7 February – Danny Baker joins the station to present a Saturday morning show. He replaces Jonathan Ross.
- 15 November – Virgin Radio starts broadcasting on DAB digital radio following the launch of the UK's first national commercial multiplex Digital One.
- 17 December – Britain's first million pounds prize is given away, on a segment of Chris Evans's Virgin breakfast show called Someone's Going to be a Millionaire (a reference to ITV's Who Wants to Be a Millionaire?, which at the time has not had a million pound winner).

=== 2000s ===
2000

- March – Scottish Media Group (now STV Group plc) buys Virgin Radio for £225 million. The Scottish Media Group, which owned Scottish Television and the Herald newspaper, fought off other bidders including Clear Channel, NRJ and Guardian Media. Evans personally made £75 million out of the sale.
- April – Leona Graham joins.
- 26 June – The Groove launches. Virgin Radio Classic Rock also launches in 2000.
- October – Clive Warren joins to present the Sunday afternoon show.
- 14 December – Gary Davies leaves and in the new year Clive Warren replaces him as presenter of the weeknight late show.
- Danny Baker leaves.

2001

- 28 June – Chris Evans is dismissed for repeatedly failing to arrive at work. Evans is replaced Steve Penk.
- 1 July – Virgin Radio stops broadcasting via Sky's analogue satellite service.

2002

- 28 January – Less than a month after joining the station, Daryl Denham takes over the breakfast show from Steve Penk.
- 1 July – Jeremy Kyle joins the station to present a weeknight show called Jezza's Virgin Confessions. He is the permanent replacement for Clive Warren who had left the station at the start of 2002.

2003

- 6 January – Pete and Geoff take over the breakfast show. They replace Daryl Denham who moves to the Drivetime show.

2004

- Richard Skinner rejoins the station to present for Virgin Radio Classic Rock. He also provides holiday cover on the main station.
- Soul, Motown and disco spin-off station The Groove is renamed Virgin Radio Groove.
- June – Jeremy Kyle and Daryl Denham leave.

2005

- 5 September – Virgin Xtreme launches. The station plays modern rock music.
- December – Richard Skinner leaves Virgin Radio Classic Rock when the station dispenses with live programming.
- 16 December – Pete and Geoff present the breakfast show for the final time.

2006

- 3 January – Geoff Lloyd launches The Geoff Show. It runs Monday to Thursday late evenings.
- 23 January – Former XFM presenter Christian O'Connell joins to present The Christian O'Connell Breakfast Show.
- 13 June – SMG plc signs a deal with YooMedia to make Virgin Radio available on Freeview.
- 15 June – Virgin Radio Party Classics launches. The station was a full-time spin-off of Suggs' Party Classics show.
- 13 October – Virgin Radio Party Classics closes.

2007

- 3 August – Tony Hadley replaces Suggs as host of Virgin Radio's Party Classics show.
- 30 November – Less than a year after taking over the afternoon show, Suggs leaves the station. He is replaced by Drive presenter Neil Francis with Nick Jackson moving from weekends to take over Drivetime.

2008

- 6 January – Iain Lee and JK and Joel join the station to present weekend shows.
- 4 April – Virgin Radio Groove stops broadcasting.
- 30 May – SMG sells Virgin Radio to TIML Golden Square Limited, a subsidiary of The Times Group for £53.2 million with £15 million set aside for rebranding. As part of the deal, Absolute Radio International, which operates two FM licences in Oxford, will manage the station.
- 1 September – The station's new owners announce that Virgin Radio will be rebranded as Absolute Radio at the end of the month.
- 25 September – The final edition of The Geoff Show is broadcast. JK and Joel also leave at around the same time.

== Absolute Radio ==
=== 2000s ===
2008

- 29 September – At 7:45 am Virgin Radio is relaunched as Absolute Radio and sister station Virgin Classic Rock is renamed Absolute Classic Rock.

2009

- March – Frank Skinner joins the station to host the Saturday breakfast show. The programme has initially only been planned to last 12 weeks but was extended due to its popularity. The show is still running with both Emily Dean and Alun Cochrane.
- 1 October – Absolute Xtreme closes and a 'user-controlled' station called Dabbl launches.
- 12 November – Iain Lee replaces Ben Jones as presenter of the weeknight late show. Consequently Sunday Night Show ends.
- 4 December – Absolute Radio 80s launches although DAB carriage is restricted to a part-time slot in London.

=== 2010s ===
2010

- 14 May – Absolute Radio 80s launches on the Digital One multiplex.
- 21 June – Absolute Radio 90s launches. It uses the part-time London slot previously occupied by Absolute 80s.
- 16 July – Absolute Radio Extra launches as an opt-out service from Absolute Radio. It broadcasts on Saturday afternoons to provide football coverage following the station's acquisition of rights to some Premier League football matches.
- August – Absolute 90s launches on the Digital One multiplex, initially as a two-month test. Two months later the carriage agreement was made permanent.
- 25 August – dabbl closes.
- 10 December – Absolute Radio 00s launches.

2011

- 29 July – Ben Jones leaves after a decade at Virgin Radio/Absolute Radio.
- 18 October – Iain Lee leaves.
- 1 November Frank Skinner's Saturday morning show starts to be simulcast across the decades-only stations and Absolute Classic Rock with different music played on each station between the links.
- 22 November – Absolute Radio 60s launches.
- 29 November – Absolute Radio 70s launches. The first show is presented by Richard Skinner, who had launched Virgin 1215 18 years earlier.

2012

- 13 August – To celebrate Team GB's Olympic success at London 2012 Absolute Radio's breakfast show host Christian O'Connell plays Spandau Ballet's 1983 hit Gold 29 times between 6.00am and 10.30am, matching the number of gold medals won by Britain's athletes.

2013

- 23 April – The Radio Today website reports that Absolute Radio has removed Absolute Radio 60s and Absolute Classic Rock from several DAB platforms in England and Wales, but the stations continue to broadcast in London and online.
- 29 July – Bauer Media Group announces that it intends to purchase Absolute from current owner, The Times Group for an amount believed to be between £20m-£25m, pending regulatory approval of the sale.
- 23 December – The deal for Bauer to buy Absolute Radio is cleared by the Office of Fair Trading.
- Absolute Radio acquires rights to broadcast the American football's National Football League. The station only held the rights for a single season.

2014

- No events.

2015

- 5 January – Absolute Radio changes from broadcasting in stereo to mono to make way for Magic on the Digital One multiplex. Also, Absolute 90s is removed from the Digital One multiplex.
- 9 February – Absolute 70s starts broadcasting on free-to-air satellite.
- 2 April – Absolute 80s announces that it will begin airing classic charts from the 1980s in the 4.00–7.00pm Sunday slot vacated by Radio 1. The show, hosted by Martyn Lee, will begin in May.
- 28 April – Russ Williams announces that he will be leaving his mid-morning show on Absolute Radio after presenting the programme for 20 years.
- July – Danielle Perry joins the station to present the weekday mid-afternoon show.
- 7 September – Absolute Radio starts broadcasting on FM in the West Midlands, replacing Planet Rock.

2016

- 29 February – Absolute 80s moves from Digital One to the newly launched Sound Digital multiplex although it continued to broadcast on Digital One until the end of April 2016.
- May – One of the station's original presenters Russ Williams leaves at the end of the 2015/16 football season. He had ended his 23 years at the station presenting the Saturday afternoon programme Rock and Roll Football which ends following Absolute Radio's decision to drop its coverage of Premier League football.

2017

- 18 January – Absolute Radio presenters Geoff Lloyd and Annabel Port leave the station. They leave in April.
- 2 October – Dave Berry joins the station to present the weekday drive time show.

2018

- 29 January – Absolute 90s returns to the Digital One multiplex.
- May – Bauer announces that it will switch off a number of Absolute Radio's filler transmitters and reduce power at five of its main transmitters. This will reduce the station's reach on MW from 90% to 85%.
- 18 May – Christian O'Connell presents the breakfast show for the final time.
- 21 May – Pete Donaldson replaces Dave Berry as presenter of the weekday "Hometime" show. Dave is to become the new breakfast show presenter.
- 23 May – Absolute 70s ends radio transmission and becomes an on-line station. It had previously been available on DAB in London and on free-to-air satellite.
- 4 June – Dave Berry takes over the breakfast show.
- 24 September – Andy Bush and Richie Firth replace Pete Donaldson as presenters of the Hometime show.
- 23 October – Launch of Jack Radio on DAB, a station from the Absolute Radio team and the first radio station to have a playlist made up entirely of female artists. Jack will also feature female sports and material from female stand-up comedians.
- 17 December – Absolute Radio stops broadcasting on FM in the West Midlands. The frequency will be transferred to Greatest Hits Radio.

2019

- 7 January – Absolute Classic Rock starts broadcasting on MW in Birmingham, Wolverhampton and Shropshire.
- 18 November – Absolute Radio 10s launches. Unlike the other decades-only stations, Absolute 10s operates exclusively online.
- 22 December – Pete Donaldson leaves.

=== 2020s ===
2020

- 24 February – Absolute Radio 20s launches and also operates exclusively online.
- 8 May – A one-off pop up station called Absolute Radio 40s broadcasts on 1215 MW and online to mark the 75th anniversary of VE Day. The service was also made available over DAB+ in London, replaced the following day by Absolute Radio 00s.
- 18 October – Skunk Anansie singer Skin joins the station to present "The Skin Show", which airs Sunday nights 10pm-12am.

2021

- 26 April –
  - Ahead of the cessation of Absolute Radio on FM in London, Absolute Radio (London feed) is removed from the CE London DAB multiplex. It is replaced by Absolute Radio 10s.
  - Absolute Radio 70s is reinstated to the Switch London DAB, converting to a stereo DAB+ service on 28 April.
- 17 May –
  - Following permission from Ofcom, Absolute Radio is removed from 105.8 FM in London and is replaced by Greatest Hits Radio. Absolute Radio, and its predecessor Virgin Radio, had been available on FM in London since 1995.
  - Country Hits Radio becomes part of the Absolute Radio Network when it is rebranded as Absolute Radio Country.
- 11 June – Absolute Radio launches the pop-up station Absolute Radio Noel to celebrate the release of the Noel Gallagher's High Flying Birds compilation album Back the Way We Came. The station is on air until 18 June.
- 6 September – Absolute Radio broadcasts its first scripted comedy series, Rockanory. Short episodes were broadcast Monday to Thursday at 11pm for the next six weeks.
- 29 September – Absolute Radio launches a week-long pop-up station Bond 24/7 to mark the release of the 25th film in the James Bond series No Time to Die and plays music from the James Bond films.

2022

- 14 July – Bauer Media launches a subscription service for Absolute Radio called Absolute Radio Premium which allows listeners to access commercial free content for a monthly fee. Five stations are launched. Two are Absolute Radio spin-offs – Absolute Radio Acoustic and Absolute Radio Classic Country – with the other three based on programmes and segments on the main station – Andy Bush's Indie Disco 24/7, Through The Decades and Haven't Heard It For Ages.
- 12 August – Absolute Radio 60s dedicates a day of programming to pirate radio stations on the anniversary of the Marine Broadcasting Offences Act 1967 which made them illegal.
- 14 November – Launch of Absolute Radio Terrace Anthems, Absolute Radio Movies and Absolute Radio 50s on Absolute Radio Premium.

2023

- 20 January – Absolute Radio stops broadcasting on AM. Consequently, Absolute Radio becomes a digital-only station. A retune loop is active from midnight on this day.
- 10 February – Launch of Absolute Radio Kevin, a station showcasing debut hits from the past and present.
- 14 February – Ofcom revokes the mediumwave licence from Absolute Radio following Bauer's decision to cease broadcasting on its AM frequency.
- 1 June – Bauer Media is fined £25,000 by Ofcom for turning off Absolute Radio's mediumwave frequency.
- 1 August – Absolute Radio adds the new station Forgotten 80s to its subscription service.
- 16 October – Absolute 80s and Absolute 90s move to the DAB+ format, broadcasting in stereo. This gives Bauer the space on the semi-national SDL multiplex to carry more stations, and these include Absolute Country and Absolute Classic Rock.
- 12 December – Absolute Radio and Absolute Radio 80s were removed from Freesat.
- 13 December – Absolute Radio, Absolute Radio 80s, Absolute Radio 90s and Absolute Radio Classic Rock were removed from Sky (all four stations) and Virgin Media (all except Absolute Radio 90s), along with every other radio station owned by Bauer Media. Bauer stations will continue to be available on Freeview.

2024

- 23 March – Frank Skinner announces he is leaving Absolute Radio after 15 years, and after his contract was not renewed.
- 13 August – Absolute Radio have signed up comedian Jon Richardson to present a Saturday morning show from September.

2025

- 31 March – Absolute Radio will begin broadcasting via DAB+, and in stereo.
