= Timeline of digital radio in the United Kingdom =

This is a list of notable events in the timeline of digital radio in the United Kingdom.

== 1990s ==
- 1990
  - The BBC begins experimental transmissions of the DAB Eureka 147 standard from the Crystal Palace transmitting station.
- 1995
  - 27 September – The BBC begins regular Digital Audio Broadcasting from five transmitters around London including Crystal Palace, Reigate Hill, Alexandra Palace, Guildford and Bluebell Hill using an innovative technique to automatically synchronise all of the transmitters - all previous networks had used manual timing compensation.The launch date was coordinated with the launch of the Swedish DAB service in Stockholm.
- 1996
  - The Broadcasting Act of 1996 allows the introduction of national, regional and local commercial ensembles in the United Kingdom.
- 1997
  - The first in-car DAB radios go on sale, at a cost of around £800.
- 1998
  - 24 March – The Radio Authority advertises the first national commercial DAB multiplex. The Authority stipulates that the three analogue Independent National Radio stations will have a guaranteed berth on the multiplex. The licence is awarded to the sole applicant, GWR Group and NTL Broadcast, to operate as Digital One.
  - 1 October – Sky Digital launches and the new service carries a range of audio channels, including a number of radio stations. However rival digital television platform OnDigital does not carry any radio services when it launches a few weeks later.
- 1999
  - 10 May – The Radio Authority licenses the first local DAB multiplex. It for the Birmingham ensemble and is licensed to CE Digital. Each local multiplex operator has to carry the area's BBC Local Radio station. However, the same guarantee is not given for the area's analogue commercial stations. The Birmingham ensemble licence award is followed by awards for licences in Manchester, Greater London, Glasgow and South Yorkshire.
  - 15 November – Britain's first national commercial DAB digital radio multiplex, Digital One, goes on air to England, and parts of Scotland and Wales. The stations carried at launch include the three national commercial AM/FM services – Classic FM, Virgin Radio (now Absolute) and Talk Radio UK (now Talksport) – along with two new digital-first stations – fresh pop service Core and adult classic rock station Planet Rock, both then under the ownership of Classic FM's then parent (and Digital One shareholder) GWR Group. Digital One would extend its station lineup and transmission area over subsequent years, and became available to Northern Ireland from 2013 (following the completion of digital television switchover in the UK and Republic of Ireland the prior autumn).

== 2000s ==
- 2000
  - 2 May – Oneword begins broadcasting on Digital One.
  - 26 June – The Groove begins broadcasting.
  - 1 August – ITN News Radio launches on the Digital One multiplex.
  - 16 October – PrimeTime Radio begins broadcasting on Digital One. It provides a music service aimed at the over 50s.
  - The first hi-fi DAB tuners go on sale, at a cost of around £2,000.
  - 14 November – BBC Parliament's audio feed on the BBC's national multiplex is closed down.
- 2001
  - Digital News Network launches to provide rolling news for the regional DAB multiplexes then licensed in England and Wales.
- 2002
  - 2 February – BBC Radio 5 Live Sports Extra is launched. It is the first of five digital only radio stations that the BBC will launch in 2002.
  - 11 March – BBC 6 Music is launched.
  - 16 August – BBC Radio 1Xtra launches.
  - 28 October – BBC Asian Network launches on DAB as a national station.
  - 30 October – Digital terrestrial television service Freeview launches. The BBC stations carried are its five digital stations plus BBC Radio 5 Live and the BBC World Service. Five commercial stations - Smash Hits, Kerrang! and Kiss, oneword and 102.2 Jazz FM - also appear on Freeview on this day. Previous DTT operator ITV Digital had never carried radio stations.
  - 15 December – BBC 7 is launched.
  - Unknown – Smash Hits Radio begins broadcasting.
  - The cost of digital radios falls below £100 for the first time following the launch of Pure Digital's Evoke series of radios.
- 2003
  - 1 January – A station named The Hits, carrying the audio of the Box Plus Network television channel of the same name, appears on DAB in London.
  - 14 February – BBC Radio 1, Radio 2, Radio 3 and Radio 4 FM start broadcasting on Freeview. They broadcast on multiplex A as there is not enough room for them on multiplex B, on which the other BBC stations are carried.
  - 1 April – The Hits on DAB switches away from the TV audio and becomes a dedicated radio stream, playing contemporary pop hits.
  - 1 July – The rolling news service on Digital One, provided by ITN, stops broadcasting.
  - 6 December – Bloomberg stops broadcasting on Digital One.
- 2004
  - April – The Hits is removed from Emap's local DAB multiplexes in favour of Kerrang! Radio.
  - 1 May – KMFM Extra begins broadcasting across Kent.
- 2005
  - Chill begins broadcasting.
- 2006
  - 2 June – Primetime Radio closes after six years on air.
  - 10 July – Yorkshire Radio begins broadcasting.
  - August – Digital News Network is absorbed into LBC by the then sole owner Chrysalis and LBC is now heard on the MXR regional multiplexes. The service is reduced and moved from its Birmingham home and into Chrysalis London. Regional news bulletins on DAB continue until the end of 2008.
  - December – Ofcom begins advertising local DAB multiplexes as many areas of the UK still did not have a local multiplex, with the first to cover Hertfordshire, Bedfordshire and Buckinghamshire. These are the first new multiplexes to be offered since Ofcom took over as regulator of radio in the UK at the end of 2003 and ten further areas were advertised during 2007. However these multiplexes did not launch until the early 2010s.
  - 25 December – theJazz begins broadcasting on Digital One.
- 2007
  - January – The Channel 4 Radio brand is launched by Channel 4.
  - 27 March – Country music station 3C closes after eight years on air.
- 2008
  - 11 January –
    - Birdsong Radio launches on the Digital One platform following the closure of Oneword. The station features recording of birdsong, a device first employed in 1992 as a test transmission for Classic FM.
    - Another of the original Digital One stations, Core Radio, stops broadcasting.
  - 12 January – The Forces Station BFBS begins a trial period of broadcasting nationwide across the UK on DAB from midnight. The trial ran until 23:59 on 31 March 2008, and audience research carried out during this time concluded that it was successful. BFBS subsequently returned to DAB Digital Radio on a permanent basis.
  - 31 March – Following its decision to exit digital broadcasting, GCap closes theJazz and Capital Life. To compensate, for the next few months, two hours of jazz music are broadcast each night on Classic FM.
  - 4 April – Virgin Radio Groove closes after eight years on air.
  - 6 May – Freesat launches and carries all the BBC's national and regional digital radio stations as well as BBC London 94.9 from day one.
  - 11 October – The closure of Channel 4 Radio is announced.
- 2009
  - 1 June – Birdsong Radio, a digital radio station broadcast from 2008 as a filler on the Digital One platform following the closure of Oneword, goes off air with the launch of Amazing Radio.
  - 21 September – Premier Christian Radio launches on Digital One.
  - 4 December – Absolute 80s launches.

== 2010s ==
- 2010
  - 24 May – Absolute 80s launches on Digital One, broadcasting in mono.
  - 21 June – Absolute Radio 90s launches.
  - 12 July – NME Radio stops broadcasting on Digital One.
  - 16 July – Absolute Radio Extra begins broadcasting. It is a part time station broadcasting on Saturday afternoons as an alternative to football commentary.
  - 10 December – Absolute Radio 00s begins broadcasting.
- 2011
  - 1 November – GMG Radio launches a dedicated station playing nothing but Christmas music, under the brand "Smooth Christmas". The station had no news or advertisements but did promote Smooth Radio and broadcast until 27 December 2011.
  - 22 November – Absolute Radio 60s launches, followed one week later by the launch of Absolute Radio 70s.
  - 23 December – GMG Radio confirms plans to launch a station dedicated to music from the 1970s on trial basis and four days later Smooth 70s replaces Smooth Christmas on the Digital One platform.
- 2012
  - 15 May – Amazing Radio leaves the DAB multiplex after a contractual dispute with Digital One owners Arqiva, but continues to broadcast online.
  - 25 June – KMFM Extra closes and is replaced on DAB by the new-countywide KMFM.
  - 27 July-12 August – The 2012 Summer Olympics take place and BBC Radio 5 Live operates a temporary station – 5 Live Olympics Extra – to provide additional coverage of the Games.
  - 25 September – It is announced that the MXR multiplexes will close between July and September 2013 after the shareholders Global Radio &and Arqiva decided not to renew the licences. Digital Radio UK stated that the released frequencies of the closed regional multiplexes will be reused for local DAB coverage roll-out.
  - 30 October – Smooth Radio confirms that Smooth Christmas will return, airing on the Digital One multiplex in the lead up to the festive season, giving the brand three stations on the platform. It launches two days later.
  - 27 December – Kiss 100 launches on the Digital One national DAB multiplex.
- 2013
  - 3 January – It is reported that Gaydar Radio owner QSoft Consulting will leave the radio business and hand its DAB licences to Manchester community station Gaydio.
  - 10 January – Radio Today reports that test transmissions for DAB+ are under way in the Brighton area.
  - 6 February – Bauer Media buys the digital station Planet Rock for a sum estimated to be between £1m and £2m.
  - 25 March – NME Radio closes after five years on air.
  - 27 April – Country music station Chris Country launches.
  - 7 May – Kisstory and KissFresh begin broadcasting and sister station Q Radio closes down after five years on air.
  - 26 July – Digital radio is switched on in Northern Ireland allowing a further 1.4 million listeners to hear stations such as Smooth 70s, Absolute Radio 90s and Jazz FM.
  - 30 July – Yorkshire Radio closes after seven years on air.
  - August – Smash Hits Radio closes after eleven years on air.
  - 27 August – The MXR regional digital radio multiplex for the West Midlands is switched off after 12 years on air.
  - 6 October – Smooth 70s stops broadcasting to make way for the launch on Digital One by Capital Xtra.
- 2014
  - 1 January – Jazz FM stops broadcasting on the Digital One multiplex, but continues to be available on DAB in London, online and through satellite television. Its Digital One slot is temporarily taken over by the return of Birdsong Radio, with plans for a permanent replacement in February.
  - May – The BBC broadcasts a pop-up digital radio service BBC Radio 2 Eurovision to extend the BBC's coverage of the Eurovision Song Contest. Returned in 2015 to provide coverage of the 2015 contest.
  - 15 November – Smooth Christmas returns to DAB in preparation for the launch of a new station with the Smooth brand.
  - 12 December – Kisstory and KissFresh start broadcasting on DAB for the first time when the appear on the Greater London I DAB multiplex. The stations had launched in May 2013 on Freeview
  - 27 December – Launch of Smooth Extra on DAB.
- 2015
  - 5 January –
    - Magic launches nationally on Digital One, while all Magic Network AM stations in the north of England are rebranded as Bauer City 2.
    - Absolute Radio changes from broadcasting in stereo to mono to make way for Magic on DAB.
  - January – Kisstory launches on many more local multiplexes across the UK.
  - 19 January – The Hits is split into a network of fresh-hits DAB stations in Bauer's heritage areas - Bauer City 3 - with split localised news, branding and advertising, and shared programme content. This programming also remains available nationally on Freeview under The Hits Radio name. The Hits is removed from DAB in London and Birmingham, the Birmingham space going to Kisstory (then to KissFresh after Kisstory's move to Sound Digital in 2016).
  - 3 February – Ofcom announces that two bids have been received for the second national digital multiplex.
  - 5–8 March – BBC Radio 2 launches its second pop-up station – BBC Radio 2 Country to cover the annual C2C: Country to Country festival. The station returned to cover the 2016 and 2017 event.
  - 27 March – The Sound Digital consortium, which includes UTV Media, wins the licence to launch the Digital Two network in 2016. UTV Media will launch four new stations on the platform.
  - 29 June – The last of the five regional multiplexes in England and wales - Yorkshire - closes down. The previous four regional multiplexes had closed in 2013. The regional multiplex covering Central Scotland continues to operate.
  - 31 July – The first of ten multiplexes trialling small-scale DAB multiplexes launches in Brighton. Initially a nine-month trial, the multiplexes extended to March 2020 by Ofcom at the request of the Department of Culture, Media and Sport.
  - 21 September – XFM is relaunched as a national digital station called Radio X on 21 September.
- 2016
  - 26 January – An error by the GPS Ground Station when attempting to remove SVN23 from the GPS constellation caused approximately half of the operational GPS satellites to broadcast the incorrect time for a period of almost 24 hours. Although the error was small, only 13.7μs, this resulted in the timing of individual DAB transmitters designed to operate as part of a Single Frequency Network (SFN) repeatedly shifting as they moved their timing source between correct and incorrect GPS satellites. In most cases, this resulted in a less than 20 seconds of lost reception once every 15 minutes whilst the transmitter and receiver resynchronized, however some areas were more affected due to systems designed to detect a failure of GPS shutting the transmitter down in order to prevent wider network interference.
  - 29 February –
    - The UK's second national commercial multiplex starts broadcasting. However, only 73% of the UK's population is able to receive it. Two of the stations - Fun Kids and Jazz FM broadcast via the newer DAB+ format.
    - Absolute 80s and Planet Rock switch from Digital One to the new multiplex although they continue to broadcast on Digital One until the end of April.
    - Heart Extra launches on Digital One.
    - Jazz FM is made available nationally as a digital station again after leaving the national DAB multiplex at the end of 2013.
  - 15 March – Mellow Magic and Talksport 2 begin broadcasting on the Sound Digital multiplex. They are joined on the multiplex on 21 March by Talkradio, on the 27th by Premier Praise, on the 28th by Magic Chilled and on the 30th by Virgin Radio.
  - April – BBC Radio 2 broadcasts its third pop-up station – BBC Radio 2 50s.
  - 1 May – Following the transfer of Kisstory to the semi-national Sound Digital multiplex, KissFresh takes over some of the local slots vacated by Kisstory.
  - Spring – Magic broadcasts a temporary pop-up service called Magic ABBA, run as a commercial partnership with Mamma Mia!: the Musical It is replaced by Magic Summer Soul. Initially intended as another short-term pop-up, the station becomes permanent in the autumn and is renamed Magic Soul.
  - 9 September – UnionJack launches on the Sound Digital multiplex.
- 2017
  - 19 January – The Armed Forces radio station BFBS announces it will cease broadcasting on the Digital One platform from March because of the cost of transmitting content through DAB.
  - 14 March – Heart 80s begins broadcasting on Digital One.
  - March – The small-scale Brighton multiplex becomes the UK's first multiplex to only broadcast via the newer DAB+ format.
  - 10 July – KissFresh launches nationally on the Digital One multiplex. Its schedule and playlist is refreshed to differentiate it from the main Kiss station.
  - 29 August – Awesome Radio stops broadcasting on the Sound Digital multiplex.
  - 1 September – The Bauer City 3 network is disbanded, and The Hits as a single national service returns to DAB in its place.
  - 18 September – The fourth roll-out of 164 new transmitters of the BBC National DAB multiplex is completed. The programme, which had run for the past two years, increased the reach from 93% to more than 97% of the UK's population.
  - 28-30 September – As part of Radio 1's 50th birthday celebrations, the BBC operates a three-day pop-up station Radio 1 Vintage celebrating the station's presenters.
- 2018
  - 24 January – BFBS returns to semi-national DAB broadcasting when it launches on the Sound Digital multiplex.
  - 15 May – Sound Digital announces that it will add 19 transmitters to its network. They will launch in the South West, East Anglia, Wales and North of Scotland and will increase Sound Digital's coverage by nearly 4 million new listeners in more than 1.6m new households.
  - 22 December – Virgin Radio Anthems and Virgin Radio Chilled launch on the Sound Digital multiplex.
- 2019
  - 11 February – Kisstory transfers from the Sound Digital multiplex to the Digital One multiplex.
  - 4 March – Launch, on Sound Digital, of classical music station Scala Radio.
  - April–June – Ofcom advertises four more local DAB multiplexes - Channel Islands, Morecambe Bay, north and west Cumbria and south west Scotland.
  - 10 June – Gold starts broadcasting nationally for the first time when it launches on Digital One.
  - 21 June – Global launches another Heart spin-off station on Digital One, Heart Dance.
  - 28 August-3 September – Global launches five more stations on DAB – Heart 90s (28 Aug), Heart 70s (30 Aug), Capital XTRA Reloaded (2 September), Smooth Country and Smooth Chill. Apart from Smooth Chill, all launch on the Digital One multiplex and broadcast via the newer DAB+ format.
  - 28 October – Global relaunches LBC London News as a national 24-hour rolling news channel called LBC News.

== 2020s ==
- 2020
  - 12 March – Global closes the national digital stations Heart Extra and Smooth Extra, replacing these on Digital One with Heart UK and Smooth UK, which share all programming content with the London stations. Capital UK on Digital One switches to DAB+ at the same time.
  - March – The ten licenses trialling small-scale DAB multiplexes are extended again, this time until December 2021.
  - 8 April – Smooth Chill launches on Digital One.
  - 29 June – Times Radio launches on Sound Digital.
  - 11 December – Union JACK Rock and Union JACK Dance launch on Sound Digital. They replace JACK Radio on the multiplex.
- 2021
  - 12 March – Boom Radio becomes available nationally on the Sound Digital multiplex, having initially launched on some local DAB platforms and online.
  - 1 August - Digital radio broadcasts roll out in the crown dependencies of the Channel Islands following the launch of a local DAB multiplex for the Channel Islands. All stations broadcast on DAB+, and this is the first local multiplex whose entire station line-up is only broadcast in the DAB+ standard.
  - 29 November – The first permanent small-scale DAB multiplex launches, covering Tynemouth and North Shields.
  - 21 December – GB News Radio appears on the Digital One platform ahead of a planned launch of 4 January 2022. The service will be a simulcast of the GB News TV channel.
- 2022
  - 24 February – Union JACK Radio, Union JACK Dance and Union JACK Rock disappear from the national SDL DAB multiplex at midnight.
  - 3 May – Fix Radio begins broadcasting nationwide after launching on the SDL Mutliplex.
  - 20 May – Heart 00s launches, broadcasting on Digital One. To make room for the new station Global removes Capital Xtra Reloaded from the national multiplex.
- 2023
  - 13 February – Capital Chill launches on the Sound Digital multiplex, and becomes the fifth Capital-branded station.
  - 16 February – Radio X Classic Rock launches on the Sound Digital multiplex.
  - September – Fun Kids is to leave the national Sound Digital multiplex after seven years, and will instead join a series of local multiplexes.
  - 26 September – Bauer announces that it is switching its stations which broadcast on the Sound Digital multiplex to the DAB+ format to make way for the launch seven more stations - - Absolute Radio Country, Absolute Classic Rock, Kerrang!, heat, Magic Chilled, Magic Soul, and Magic at the Musicals. The changes will happen later in the autumn.
- 2024
  - 2 January - Classic FM switches from DAB to DAB+.
  - 8 January – Smooth Relax, launches. The station occupies the space on Digital One which had become available following the conversion of Classic FM to DAB+.
  - 7 February – The BBC announces plans to launch four new radio stations on DAB+, including a Radio 2 spin-off playing music from the 1950s, 60s and 70s, and a Radio 1 spin-off playing music from the past two decades.
  - 8 February – Nearly 15 years after launching on DAB, Classic FM finally becomes available via digital radio in the Channel Islands. LBC also launches in the Channel islands at the same time.
  - 12 September – Global launches Smooth 80s and Capital Anthems on the Sound Digital multiplex.
- 2025
  - 31 March –
    - Bauer launches four decade-specific spin-off stations - Greatest Hits Radio 70s, Greatest Hits Radio 80s, Hits Radio 90s and Hits Radio 00s. All four will launch on the Digital One multiplex.
    - Absolute Radio, Kiss, Kisstory and Magic Radio transfer to the DAB+ format, allowing the stations to begin broadcasting via DAB in stereo.
    - Kiss Fresh is rebranded as Kiss Xtra.
  - 11 September – Launch of BBC Radio 1 Dance, BBC Radio 1 Anthems and BBC Radio 3 Unwind on DAB+.
- 2026
  - 6 January – STV Radio launches on DAB and DAB+ in areas across Scotland, and nationwide on STV Player and smart speaker.
  - 2 April – Boom Rock is made available on DAB in London.

== See also ==
- Timeline of independent radio in the United Kingdom
