= Timeline of Bauer Media Audio UK =

A timeline of notable events relating to Bauer Media Audio UK, a British media company established as a division of German company Bauer Media Group in 2008.

== 2000s ==
- 2008
  - 29 January – Bauer completes its purchase of Emap's radio, television and consumer media businesses for £1.14bn.
- 2009
  - No events.

== 2010s ==
- 2010
  - No events.
- 2011
  - No events.
- 2012
  - No events.
- 2013
  - 6 February – Bauer Media buys the digital station Planet Rock for a sum estimated to be between £1m and £2m.
  - 15 April – Bauer increases networking on its Yorkshire Magic stations with a networked breakfast show coming from Magic 828 in Leeds.
  - 1 July – Bauer's Scottish MW stations start to receive a networked breakfast show from Glasgow presented by Robin Galloway. Consequently, there is now no local programming on any of these stations.
  - 29 July – Bauer Media Group announces that it intends to purchase Absolute Radio from The Times Group for an amount believed to be between £20m and £25m, pending regulatory approval.
- 2014
  - No events.
- 2015
  - 5 January –
    - Magic London launches nationally on Digital One, while the Magic AM network stations in the north of England are rebranded as Bauer City 2.
    - Absolute Radio changes from broadcasting in stereo to mono to make way for Magic on DAB.
  - 31 March – Ofcom launches an investigation into Bauer Media and Absolute Radio for an alleged breach of its regulations, but no details of the incident are to be released until the investigation is complete.
  - 7 December – Following permission from the regulator, Bauer swaps Radio City 2's format and frequencies with that of Radio City Talk. This gives City Network 2 its first berth on FM in England.
- 2016
  - 15 March – Mellow Magic begins broadcasting on the Sound Digital multiplex and is joined by another Magic spin-off, Magic Chilled on the 28th.
  - 6 May – Orion Media announces that they have been bought by Bauer for an undisclosed fee, reportedly between £40 and £50 million. This gives Bauer the West Midlands network of Free Radio stations and East Midlands regional station Gem 106.
- 2017
  - 3 January – Bauer Radio's Cash for Kids appeal raises £15.5 million for charity.
- 2018
  - 3 April – Aberdeen station Northsound 2 stops broadcasting on MW. The station continues to broadcast on DAB and online. It becomes the first commercial radio station in Scotland – and the first of Bauer's local stations – to cease analogue broadcasting.
  - 18 April – Bauer Radio announces that, on 4 June, its Manchester station Key 103 will be rebranded and relaunched as Hits Radio, a CHR-led music station aimed at 25–44 year olds. The station will be merged with The Hits to provide a single national service across the UK on DAB, Freeview and online. In Manchester, Hits Radio will continue to provide local news and information, traffic bulletins and advertising. Hits Radio will also produce and broadcast off-peak programming for Bauer's network of CHR local stations which will continue to air local programming at peak times.
  - 25 May – Ahead of the launch of Hits Radio on 4 June, the name Key 103 disappears from the Manchester airwaves.
  - 4 June – Following the renaming of Key 103 to Hits Radio, Key 2 is renamed Key Radio.
  - 16 August – Bauer Radio purchases Jazz FM.
- 2019
  - 7 January –
    - Greatest Hits Radio replaces the Bauer City 2 branding. Individual station identities in Northern England are dropped and are rebranded to GHR with Scotland unaffected. The new network extends to the West Midlands although GHR West Midlands continues to air a weekday three-hour local show.
    - Free Radio 80s closes and is replaced on MW by Absolute Classic Rock or GHR West Midlands.
  - 5 February – it is announced that Bauer has acquired over thirty further stations to its network by way of the purchase of Lincs FM Group and Celador Radio. Several of the purchased stations, including KCFM in East Yorkshire, are sold on to Nation Broadcasting due to overlap with existing Bauer assets (in KCFM's case, Viking FM.)
  - 8 February – The Wireless Group sells its network of local radio stations in England and Wales to Bauer Media.
  - 4 March – Launch of classical music station Scala Radio.
  - 5 March – Bauer purchases the ten FM stations owned by UKRD. The deal includes the purchase of three local DAB multiplexes.
  - 5 April – Bauer launches Country Hits Radio which is broadcast on a number of local DAB multiplexes.
  - 2 September – Bauer begins to network its Hits Radio Manchester weekday drivetime show on all but one of its Hits Radio stations in England, leaving only the weekday breakfast show as a local show, following the removal in July of the one remaining local weekend programme.
  - 18 November – Absolute Radio launches its sixth decades-only station, Absolute Radio 10s which, unlike its sister stations, operates exclusively online.
  - 21 November – Bauer launches Magic at the Musicals on DAB+ in and around London. Presenters include Ruthie Henshall and Jonathan Bailey.

== 2020s ==
- 2020
  - 24 February – Absolute Radio 20s launches.
  - 14 April – Bauer Radio takes full control of Celador Radio, Lincs FM Group, Wireless Group local stations and UKRD Group.
  - 1 May – Bauer Radio takes 100% share in First Radio Sales.
  - 27 May – Bauer announces that the majority of the stations it acquired from UKRD, Lincs, Wireless and Celador will be joining the Greatest Hits Radio network from September, clustered to provide regional programming outside of network hours. Four of the acquired stations will join the Hits Radio network, retaining local names and a daily breakfast show, and three stations – Lincs FM, Pirate FM and SAM FM Bristol – will continue as largely standalone stations.
  - 31 May – Liverpool speech station Radio City Talk closes.
  - 30 June – Bauer switches off the MW transmitters which had been carrying Absolute Classic Rock since the start of 2019. Consequently, Bauer is no longer broadcasting on MW in the West Midlands.
  - 20 July – Pulse 1, Signal 1, The Wave 96.4 and Fire Radio become part of the Hits Radio network with all programming, apart from weekday breakfast, networked. All four stations retain their station name.
  - 28 August – Bauer launches Hits Radio Pride, aimed at the LGBTQ+ community. This is the first time that a major radio broadcaster in the United Kingdom has launched a station that is targeted to the LGBTQ+ community.
  - 31 August – Bauer closes Leeds station Radio Aire after 39 years on air. Its frequency is, from the following day, used to carry Greatest Hits Radio.
  - 1 September – The majority of the stations that Bauer Media acquired the previous year from UKRD – Lincs FM Group, Wireless Group and Celador Radio – join Greatest Hits Radio, clustered to provide regional programming outside of network hours, consisting of three hours each weekday teatime. All of the affected stations lose their individual station names.
  - 29 September – Bauer Radio launches a campaign to support The Prince's Trust, spearheaded by Magic Radio.
  - 10 November – Ofcom approves two regional changes for Bauer Radio licences, allowing it to switch two licences to different regions.
  - 16 November – Following Bauer's purchase of The Revolution, the east Manchester station is closed and its frequency transferred to Greatest Hits Radio, thereby giving Greatest Hits Radio Manchester its first berth on FM.
- 2021
  - 24 February – Bauer Media enters into an agreement to buy Communicorp, the Ireland-based company that owns brands including Today FM and Newstalk. The agreement is subject to approval from the regulator, and excludes Communicorp's UK radio stations which are operated under the Global name.
  - 2 March – Bauer Media receives Ofcom approval to network all programming between CFM and other Bauer stations in the north west.
  - 7 March – Ofcom gives Bauer Radio approval to add its newly acquired Plymouth licence to its South West Approved Area of radio stations.
  - 31 March – Following the death of Sarah Everard, Bauer Radio streams a special panel show titled We Need to Talk About Women's Safety simultaneously across its stations at 8pm.
  - 26 April – Bauer switches off its medium wave frequencies in Lancashire, Greater Manchester, Leeds and Humberside, following the launch of Greatest Hits Radio on FM in those areas.
  - 4 May – Bauer Radio announces plans to launch premium online subscription services to complement Scala Radio, Jazz FM, Planet Rock and Kerrang! Radio, with an extra 20 stations available ad-free and with extra content.
  - 17 May
    - Country Hits Radio is renamed as Absolute Radio Country and made part of the Absolute Radio Network.
    - Greatest Hits Radio launches on FM in London, on the frequency that carried Absolute Radio. Bauer is able to make the change following permission from Ofcom to swap Absolute Radio with Greatest Hits Radio.
    - Bauer Radio is granted regulatory approval to purchase Communicorp, with the deal completing on 31 May.
  - 1 June – Bauer Media announces the completion of its acquisition of Communicorp.
  - 17 June – Bauer purchases Stockport-based Imagine FM and announces it will add the three licences it purchases to the Greatest Hits Radio network, further expanding GHR's coverage of the Greater Manchester environs and into north Derbyshire (where GHR already occupies the former Peak FM). The switch takes place on 1 September 2021.
  - 25 September – Bauer Radio becomes Bauer Media Audio UK.
- 2022
  - 16 February – The online output of Bauer Radio's stations goes down for around half an hour just before 8am because of an internal update to their streaming service.
  - 27 May –
    - Bauer Media announce plans to launch a subscription service for Absolute Radio and KISS, allowing listeners to access commercial-free content for a monthly fee.
    - The RadioToday website reports that Bauer Radio is refurbishing the studios of Wave 105 near Southampton in preparation for it to become the company's South Broadcast Centre.
  - 14 July – Bauer Media launches a subscription service for Absolute Radio and KISS, allowing listeners to access commercial free content for a monthly fee as well as brand spin-off stations, such as Absolute Radio Acoustic and Absolute Radio Classic Country.
  - 19 September –
    - Greatest Hits Radio is removed from frequencies in Southern England, Suffolk and East Yorkshire, while Hits Radio disappears in Hampshire. This occurs due to Nation Broadcasting ending its franchising agreement with Bauer Media.
    - Wave 105's Poole transmitter relays Greatest Hits Radio Dorset, with Wave 105 remaining on its main transmitter.
  - 24 October – Bauer Media moves Radio Borders from Galashiels to the new Edinburgh headquarters. News, sport and weather, as well as Greg and Lynsey at Breakfast will continue to broadcast to the Radio Borders area.
  - 14 November – Launch of Absolute Radio Terrace Anthems, Absolute Radio Movies and Absolute Radio 50s on Absolute Radio Premium.
- 2023
  - 23 January – Absolute Radio stops broadcasting on AM. Consequently, Absolute Radio will become a digital-only station.
  - 14 February – Ofcom revokes the mediumwave licence from Absolute Radio following Bauer's decision to cease broadcasting on its AM frequency.
  - 20 March – Bauer launches a regional Greatest Hits Radio service for Cambridge, Peterborough and Suffolk on DAB ahead of proposed changes to its FM frequencies in the area.
  - 3 April –
    - Clyde 2, Forth 2, MFR 2, Tay 2, Westsound (Ayrshire and Dumfries & Galloway) and Radio Borders rebrand as Greatest Hits Radio.
    - Bauer replaces Lincs FM with Greatest Hits Radio Lincolnshire on 102.2FM, 96.7FM and 97.6FM, while Lincs FM continues to air on DAB.
  - 1 June – Bauer Media is fined £25,000 by Ofcom for turning off Absolute Radio's mediumwave frequency.
  - 1 July – Simon Myciunka succeeds Dee Ford as CEO of Bauer Media Audio UK.
  - 11 July – Ofcom gives Bauer Media permission to change KISS Radio to Greatest Hits Radio on three of its four FM frequencies in the East of England. Kiss will continue on FM in Norwich.
  - 17 July – Bauer Media announces plans to acquire the Jack FM licences in Oxfordshire, something that will lead to the 106.4FM, 106.8FM and 107.9FM frequencies being rebranded, possibly as Hits Radio and Greatest Hits Radio, following the acquisition, subject to regluatory approval.
  - 1 August – Bauer signs a deal with Audible to promote its content.
  - 11 August – Bauer signs a deal with Samsung to become the sponsors of the Magic Radio Breakfast Show.
  - 4 September –
    - Greatest Hits Radio launches local radio services for Kent and Northern Ireland.
    - Hits Radio extends its networked drivetime programme to Hits Radio Bristol and Hits Radio South Coast, with local programming on those stations moving to mid-mornings.
  - 26 September –
    - Bauer announces that it is switching its stations which broadcast on the Sound Digital multiplex to the DAB+ format to make way for the national launch seven more stations – Absolute Radio Country, Absolute Classic Rock, Kerrang!, heat, Magic Chilled, Magic Soul, and Magic at the Musicals. The changes will happen later in the autumn.
    - Vivian Mohr is appointed as President of Bauer Media Audio UK, replacing Richard Dawkins.
  - 2 October – Gem 106's FM frequency switches over to Greatest Hits Radio while Gem continues to broadcast on DAB.
  - 23 October – Bauer introduces Hits Radio programming to Lincs FM with the single exception being its breakfast show, which remains a local programme.
  - 30 October – Bauer launches Greatest Hits Radio and Hits Radio in Oxfordshire, replacing Jack FM.
  - 28 November – The Radio Today website reports that Bauer Media is to remove all of its radio stations from Sky, Virgin Media and Freesat TV platforms by 13 December.
  - 30 November – Bauer Media Group launches a new brand and corporate logo.
  - 11 December – Bauer shuts down all of its remaining MW Greatest Hits Radio transmissions.
  - 13 December – Bauer removes all of its radio stations, including Greatest Hits Radio, from the Sky and Virgin Media TV platforms.
  - 18 December – Bauer places the offices of Stoke-on-Trent's Signal 1 on the market for £600,000, having taken the decision to move the station's broadcasting team to Birmingham.
- 2024
  - January –
    - The final local programming on Lancashire's Rock FM and Liverpool's Radio City ends when the two stations' breakfast shows merge.
    - Bauer drops local news bulletins from its Salisbury frequencies of Greatest Hits Radio South, on the grounds that they sound "jarring and parochial" alongside networked programming. They are replaced with regional bulletins from Wave 105.
  - 20 February – GB News announces it has ended its radio advertising and sponsorship contract with Bauer Media, and that it is launching its own advertising sales operation.
  - 27 February – Bauer announces plans to rebrand Wave 105 as Greatest Hits Radio South Coast and Pirate FM as Greatest Hits Radio Cornwall.
  - March – Salisbury-specific bulletins on the Salisbury frequencies of Greatest Hits Radio South on weekdays are reinstated.
  - 2 April – Bauer removes its radio stations from Freeview TV platform.
  - 17 April – Bauer stations Free Radio, Pirate FM, Gem Radio, Hallam FM, Lincs FM, Metro Radio, Pulse 1, Radio City, Rock FM, Signal 1, TFM, Viking FM and The Wave rebrand to Hits Radio. The stations continue to have local breakfast output, but will have networked programming at other times. Local news, advertising and traffic updates will also continue to air.
  - 16 May – Bauer Media Audio UK's new headquarters at The Lantern near London's Euston Station is officially opened.
  - 24 June – Bauer launches Rayo, a new audio platform that enables online listeners to stream 50 Bauer stations.
  - 16 September –
    - Scala Radio rebrands to Magic Classical and Magic Chilled becomes Hits Radio Chilled.
    - West FM is rebranded as Clyde 1 Ayrshire.
    - Launch of Greatest Hits Radio 60s.
  - 22 September – After 34 years, Kiss 100 stops broadcasting on FM due to it being replaced by Hits Radio.
  - 27 September – Bauer ends its local Greatest Hits Radio programming for Cumbria as its offices in Carlisle are closed. The local programme is replaced by a regionally networked programme, airing from Liverpool.
  - 31 October – All non-networked programming on Greatest Hits Radio ends today following Bauer's decision to fully network the station.
- 2025
  - 3 March – Following its acquisition in January of Star Radio in Cambridgeshire, the station is rebranded and relaunched as Hits Radio.
  - 31 March –
    - Bauer launch four decade-specific spin-off stations - Greatest Hits Radio 70s, Greatest Hits Radio 80s, Hits Radio 90s and Hits Radio 00s. All four will launch on the Digital One multiplex.
    - Absolute Radio, Kiss, Kisstory and Magic Radio transfer to the DAB+ format, allowing the stations to begin broadcasting via DAB in stereo.
    - Kiss Fresh is rebranded as Kiss Xtra.
  - 6 June – Eleven Hits Radio local breakfast shows across England and Wales air for the final time as Bauer prepares to transmit a single breakfast show for the entire network. This means that Bauer no longer broadcasts any local programming in England and Wales.
  - 9 June – Bauer begins networking a single breakfast show across its Hits Radio network in England and Wales.
- 2026
  - 12 April – Bauer unveils new branding logos for Kiss as it seeks to target the rise in digital media.

== See also ==
- Timeline of Global Radio
