= Absolute Xtreme =

British digital radio station

- United Kingdom
- Frequencies: DAB: London; Freesat (Ch. 726); Sky Digital (Ch. 0200); Virgin Media (Ch. 951)

Programming
- Format: New alternative music

Ownership
- Owner: TIML Radio Limited
- Sister stations: Absolute Radio; Absolute Classic Rock; Absolute Radio 60s; Absolute Radio 70s; Absolute Radio 80s; Absolute Radio 90s; Absolute Radio 00s; Absolute Radio Extra

History
- First air date: 5 September 2005
- Last air date: 1 October 2009
- Former names: Virgin Radio Xtreme

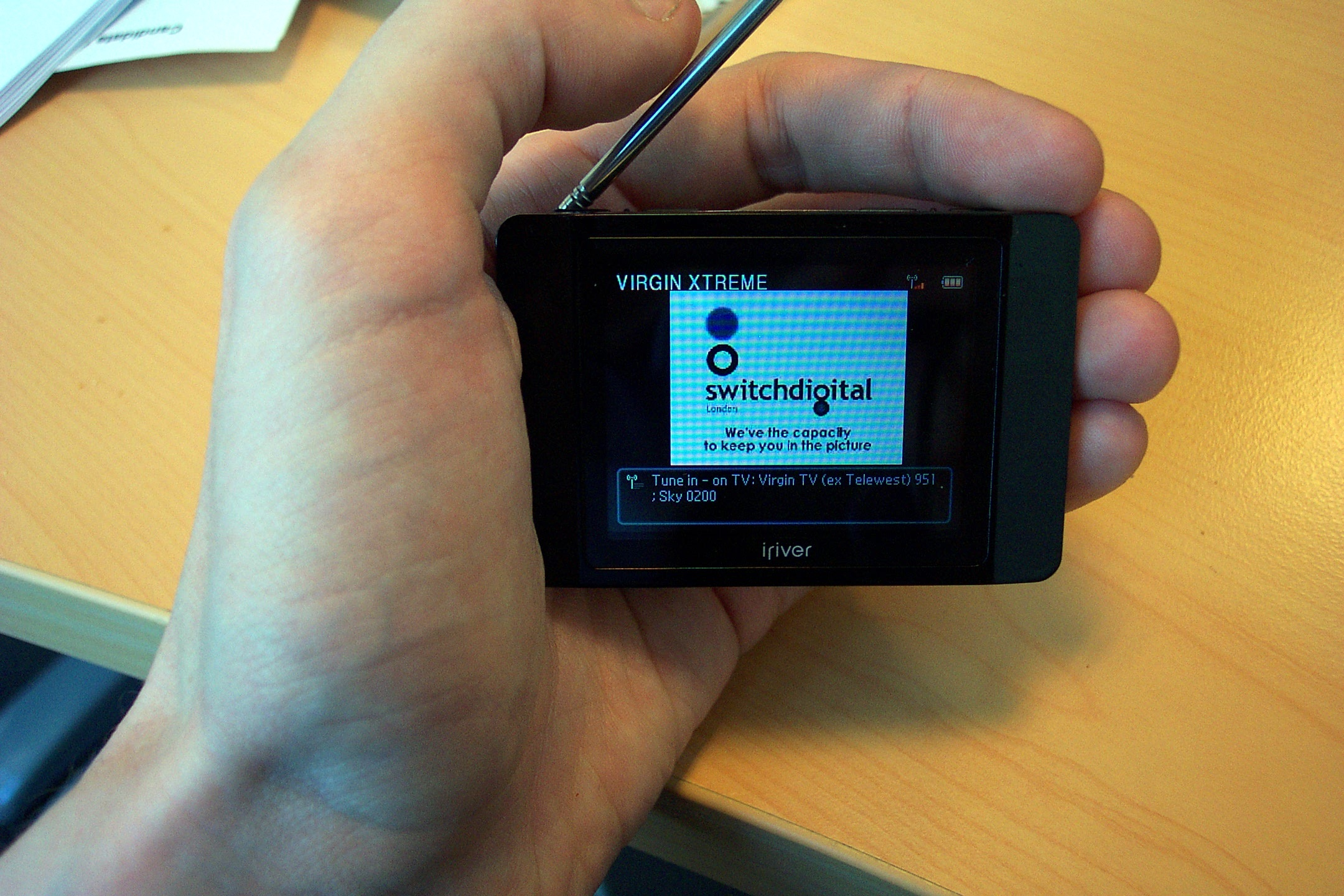
Virgin Xtreme on DAB

Absolute Xtreme was a digital radio station broadcasting in the United Kingdom, which played new alternative music.

== History ==
Virgin Radio Xtreme, as it was initially branded, launched at 12.15am on 5 September 2005 by then Virgin Radio DJ, Steve Harris. Its music policy aimed at playing modern rock for a youth audience.

Since the departure (to rival station Xfm London) of Steve Harris at the end of 2006, the channel played non-stop music 24 hours a day. The station had carried shows which included The Edge with Steve Harris, "Hippies for an Hour" (an acoustic music show), and The Xtreme Mix with "Silent" Dave Lambert.

Originally part of the Virgin Radio network of stations, it was wholly owned by STV Group plc, until 30 May 2008 when Virgin Radio was purchased by the TIML Golden Square Ltd, a subsidiary of the Times of India group, for £53.2 million.

As a result of the sale of the Virgin Radio stations and the rebranding of Virgin Radio to Absolute Radio, on 1 September 2008, it was announced that Virgin Radio Xtreme would be rebranded as Absolute Xtreme on 29 September 2008.

In October 2009, it was announced that Absolute Xtreme would be replaced on DAB and digital TV by an all-1980s music station, Absolute Radio 80s, with listeners seeking alternative music redirected to new user-controlled station dabbl, which itself closed in 2010.

== Former DJs ==
- Steve Harris
- David "Silent Dave" Lambert

== Tuning In ==
- DAB Digital Radio in London on the Switch Multiplex
- Freesat Channel 726
- Sky Digital Channel 0200
- Virgin Media Channel 951
