= Dabbl =

Programming
- Format: New and live music

Ownership
- Owner: TIML Radio Limited
- Sister stations: Absolute Radio; Absolute Classic Rock; Absolute Radio 60s; Absolute Radio 70s; Absolute 80s; Absolute Radio 90s; Absolute Radio 00s; Absolute Radio Extra

History
- First air date: 1 October 2009
- Last air date: 25 August 2010
- Former names: CTRL

Dabbl was a user-controlled radio station broadcast on the Internet and on DAB Digital Radio in Cardiff 24 hours a day and in London from 7pm to 6am daily. Its content was chosen by members of Absolute Radio's website VIP Service, who select songs which are then voted for. Songs with the most votes are then broadcast. It operated from 1 October 2009 until 25 August 2010.

== CTRL ==
Dabbl first appeared on DAB in London under the name "CTRL", however this was just broadcasting the "Absolute Radio" launch clock sound.

== Availability ==
The station was previously available on the multiplexes in London on the Switch multiplex between 7 pm and 6 am, and in Cardiff and online 24 hours a day. In Bristol & Bath, Southend & Chelmsford, Swindon, Reading & Basingstoke, it was replaced by the more popular Absolute 90s in June 2010.
