= Virgin Radio Groove (2000) =

United Kingdom
- Frequencies: DAB: London; Sky

Ownership
- Owner: Scottish Media Group (2000–2008); TIML Radio Limited (2008)
- Sister stations: Virgin Radio; Virgin Radio Classic Rock; Virgin Radio Xtreme

History
- First air date: 26 June 2000
- Last air date: 4 April 2008
- Former call signs: The Groove (2000–2004)

Links
- Website: www.virginradiogroove.co.uk

A sister station to Virgin Radio, Virgin Radio Groove is a former radio station that broadcast worldwide on the internet and in London on DAB digital radio. The station was launched as The Groove on 26 June 2000, and was renamed Virgin Radio Groove in 2004. It officially closed on 31 December 2007; however, it continued to broadcast until 4 April 2008.

It played motown, soul and disco music and the first song played on The Groove was "ABC" by the Jackson 5.

As well as being broadcast online, Virgin Radio Groove broadcast on DAB in London and selected digital television networks (Sky and Virgin Media). On 5 September 2005, the station was temporarily replaced by Virgin Radio Xtreme on DAB in London, but returned in early 2006, as a part-time service, daily from 7.00pm to 6.00am.

== Closure ==
Virgin Radio Groove was due to close down at the end of 2007. This came after it was revealed that plans to launch Virgin Radio Viva, which would have been on the new Channel 4 platform and aimed at 15 to 29-year-old women, had been scrapped.

== Revival ==
At the end of 2019, Wireless Group, which had taken up the Virgin Radio brand in the UK from 2016, revived the name Virgin Radio Groove as a new digital station.
