= Absolute Radio Network =

British digital radio network

- Country: United Kingdom
- Broadcast area: United Kingdom
- Headquarters: London

Coverage
- Stations: Absolute Radio; Absolute Radio 60s; Absolute Radio 70s; Absolute Radio 80s; Absolute Radio 90s; Absolute Radio 00s; Absolute Radio 10s; Absolute Radio 20s; Absolute Radio Country; Absolute Radio Classic Rock

Links
- Webcast: Rayo
- Website: Absolute Radio Network

The Absolute Radio Network is a network of ten radio stations owned and operated by Bauer Radio. Bauer purchased the TIML Radio Limited network of stations in 2013. Most of the Absolute Radio stations are decade-themed services, alongside the flagship station and classic rock and country-formatted stations. The network is aimed at 35 to 54 year olds.

According to RAJAR, the network broadcasts to a combined weekly audience of 5.4 million with a listening share of 3.5% as of March 2024.

== Network programming ==
Beginning in 2008, the Absolute Radio Network stations (with the exception of 20s) utilise a 'split playlist' solution developed at Absolute Radio to syndicate the presenter links of the weekday Dave Berry Breakfast Show and, since 23 September 2019, Hometime with Bush and Richie from the main Absolute Radio station, with their music tracks replaced by those relevant to each station, chosen by the network database to match the required length, mood and tempo.

Weekend morning programmes, The Frank Skinner Show (Saturday) and The Jason Manford Show (Sunday) are broadcast on a one-hour time delay (airing from 8am on Absolute Radio and from 9am on the digital siblings), again with music tracks replaced by relevant music for each service - with the exception of Absolute Radio Country which does not share weekend morning programming.

Some thematic shows from the core Absolute Radio are simulcast onto a relevant sibling: 80s Greatest Hits on Friday evening is simulcast on Absolute 80s, Classic Rock Party on Saturday evenings is relayed on Absolute Classic Rock, and the first two hours of Andy Bush's Indie Disco on Saturday evening are transmitted on both Absolute Radio and Absolute Radio 90s, continuing on the 90s station only for a further two hours thereafter.

At other times, the digital stations broadcast their own dedicated programming, or non-stop music.

== Current stations ==
=== Absolute Radio ===
The core station, established as one of three Independent National Radio franchises, began broadcasting in April 1993. It broadcast on AM radio from launch to late January 2023, and since 1999, broadcasts on national DAB. Initially branded Virgin Radio, the station was renamed Absolute Radio in 2008.

=== Absolute Classic Rock ===
This station, playing classic rock music from the 1960s to the 1990s, was established as online back-to-back music service Virgin Classic in 2000, capitalising on the popularity of classic rock music within the general Virgin Radio schedule. The station was relaunched as a presenter-led service under the name Virgin Radio Classic Rock in 2004, and launched onto DAB in London (replacing Liquid). The station was subsequently made available on Virgin Media, Sky and, from 2008, Freesat. As part of the 2008 rebrand of Virgin Radio to Absolute Radio, Virgin Radio Classic Rock was renamed Absolute Classic Rock. The availability of Absolute Classic Rock was extended in late 2010 when the service was rolled out to a number of other DAB multiplexes, mainly in the north of England where it replaced Global Radio-owned Gold on several Bauer Media-owned DAB platforms. (Global later reintroduced Gold to these areas in January 2011 by withdrawing their own rival classic rock service The Arrow from MXR North East and three local multiplexes in Yorkshire, and putting Gold in its place.)

=== Absolute Radio Country ===
In May 2021, the newly rebranded Country Hits Radio joined the Absolute Radio Network as Absolute Radio Country, opening with "Jolene" by Dolly Parton as voted by its listeners to be the first song played.

=== Music from the 20th century ===
==== Absolute Radio 60s ====
In October 2011, Absolute announced the imminent launch of two new stations to complete their series of decade-themed services. The first of these, Absolute Radio 60s, covers a range of 1960s music, stretching from British pop/rock bands of the era such as The Beatles and The Rolling Stones to soul and Motown tracks. The 60s service began broadcasting from 22 November 2011 on various DAB multiplexes around the country and online. A holding website went live at absoluteradio60s.co.uk following the announcement, with basic information including the proposed station schedule. It was later revealed that Absolute Radio 60s would broadcast on various DAB multiplexes on which Absolute Classic Rock currently broadcasts, with Classic Rock reducing its broadcast capacity on each multiplex to release space for the 60s service.

==== Absolute Radio 70s ====
Absolute Radio 70s launched on Tuesday 29 November 2011. This station plays a broad mix of music from the era, ranging from rock and punk, to glam and soul. Announced on the same day as the 60s service, but launching a week later, Absolute Radio 70s launched on DAB initially in London only, but will also be available nationally and globally online. A website holding page was opened at absoluteradio70s.co.uk in line with the announcement of the station, which carries station information and an indicative schedule. Absolute Radio 70s shares the DAB slot currently used by Absolute Radio 00s, with 00s cutting its broadcast capacity (and switching to broadcast in mono) to release space for the 70s service.

==== Absolute Radio 80s ====
This station, dedicated to playing classic hits from the 1980s, launched on 4 December 2009 in place of Absolute Xtreme, initially taking Xtreme's London DAB slot alongside its national Sky, Freesat and Virgin Media positions. It also broadcasts online. Described as being aimed at "reluctant adults" who want to reconnect with the tunes of their youth, Absolute Radio 80s plays a range of pop and rock hits from the decade and bills itself as "the UK's only 1980s radio station" (other all-80s music services are available online, but these do not have the DAB/digital TV broadcast platforms which Absolute Radio 80s does). In May 2010, Absolute Radio 80s moved onto the national Digital One DAB platform; its London slot was used to launch Absolute Radio 90s the following month.

==== Absolute Radio 90s ====
Absolute 90s launched on 21 June 2010 on DAB, initially taking the London slot vacated by Absolute Radio 80s moving to Digital One, and then subsequently replacing dabbl in Essex, Wiltshire, Bristol, Berkshire and Bath. Shortly after launch, the 90s service became available on Digital One, sharing a broadcast slot with Absolute Radio Extra, for what was initially billed as a five-week trial run; however, the trial continued beyond this, and in November 2010 it was confirmed that 90s would remain available nationally on a regular basis. The station is also available on Sky, with Absolute having leased back channel 0203 from WRN; like Absolute's other stations, the 90s service is available online and via mobile smartphones. As the name suggests, the station plays music from the 1990s, following a similar format to the Absolute Radio 80s service. As with Absolute Radio 80s, the Dave Berry breakfast programme is simulcast on the digital station, as is relevant 90s programming from the main Absolute Radio.

=== Music from the 21st century (2000s) ===
==== Absolute Radio 00s ====
A third "decade" station launched in December 2010. The service will initially be run on a trial basis until January 2011 but could be extended thereafter. As with the 80s and 90s stations, the new service will broadcast a range of music from the relevant decade and will feature shows hosted by Absolute DJs. The station will broadcast on DAB in London, online and via smartphone apps. The announcement of Absolute Radio 00s was accompanied by the news that Absolute Radio 90s would remain on the Digital One national platform on a regular basis following its trial run; the London DAB slot previously taken by Absolute Radio 90s was reallocated to the 00s service. Absolute Radio 00s is not currently available via digital TV.

==== Absolute Radio 10s ====
The eighth station in the Absolute Radio network began broadcasting at 10am on Monday 18 November 2019, and operated solely online until being made available as a DAB+ service in London from 26 April 2021. Like the other Absolute decades, the station will air the main Absolute Radio Breakfast and Hometime shows with decade-relevant music inserted, and the weekend Frank Skinner and Jason Manford programmes. A launch special, presented by Absolute DJ Jay Lawrence, played the station's first track, "Pompeii" by Bastille.

==== Absolute Radio 20s ====
The ninth station in the Absolute Radio network began broadcasting at 10am on Monday 24 February 2020, and operates solely online. The first song played was "Instant History" by Biffy Clyro.

=== Pop-up stations ===
==== Absolute Radio 40s ====
Absolute Radio 40s was a pop-up station on 8 May 2020, the 75th anniversary of VE Day. The station used the 1215 AM frequency to play songs from The Andrews Sisters, Vera Lynn, Billie Holiday, Judy Garland, Glenn Miller, Bing Crosby, Doris Day and Gracie Fields for 24 hours with Dave Berry, Leona Graham and Claire Sturgess presenting shows, which included archive footage and reminisces from VE Day veterans. Absolute Radio 40s was also found online and on DAB.

==== Absolute Radio Noel ====
Absolute Radio Noel was a pop-up station that ran from 11 June to 18 June 2021. It was launched to mark ten years since Noel Gallagher launched his post-Oasis band Noel Gallagher's High Flying Birds. It also coincided with the release of the band's best of album Back the Way We Came: Vol. 1 (2011–2021). The station featured an interview with Gallagher alongside performances, archive content, a ‘Through The Decades’ playlist chosen by Gallagher and a playback of the album.

=== Absolute Radio You ===
==== Absolute Radio Sisters ====
This pop-up was the winning idea of the 2024 Absolute Radio You competition, with the pitch coming from Scottish sisters Rachael and Emma Hare. The service, whose strapline was ‘Where Sibling Rivalry Matters’, played a mixture of music from the 1990s and 2000s, and aired from 12 to 22 February 2024. This pop-up follows Absolute Radio Natalie in 2022 and Absolute Radio Kevin.

==== Absolute Radio Kevin ====
This pop-up was the winning idea of the 2023 Absolute Radio You competition, proposed by Kevin McIlmurray from Ewell, Surrey as Absolute Radio Debut. The station was on air between 10 February and 20 February 2023, and played debut singles by various artists from the 1950s onwards, as well as tracks from debut albums.

==== Absolute Radio Natalie ====
The first winner of the Absolute Radio You competition was Natalie Cole who proposed a service ‘Where sing-alongs matter’. The station was on air in February 2022 and played show tunes from the stage and Disney films, mixed with upbeat pop tracks and boyband ballads.

== Former stations ==
Various stations have been operated as subsidiaries of Virgin Radio and/or Absolute Radio over time but are no longer provided. These include:

=== Absolute Radio Extra ===
Established in 2010, Absolute Radio Extra enabled Absolute to carry its FA Premier League football coverage on DAB. During match coverage, the analogue frequencies of Absolute were split, with the London 105.8 FM service carrying scores-and-music show "Rock 'n Roll Football", and the national 1215 AM service carrying match coverage. On DAB, the main Absolute service carried "Rock 'n Roll Football", with Extra carrying match coverage. Extra was also used for coverage of music festivals and events (such as V Festival) in addition to the coverage available on the main station. Absolute Radio Extra has subsequently ceased operation: the core Absolute service on DAB continues to relay the shared programming output of the national AM/London FM service.

=== Absolute Xtreme ===
This station played new, independent and alternative music; it grew from Virgin Radio's new/underground music programming of the time (such as "Razor Cuts" and "The Edge"); presenter of "The Edge", Steve Harris, was the principal voice on the station at its launch. The station was launched by station manager Lali Parikh on 5 September 2005, with the first content on air being a special launch announcement broadcast at 12.15 am that morning (a reference to the parent station's 1215AM frequency). Xtreme took over the digital TV and Switch London DAB slots previously held by Virgin Radio Groove, though Groove continued as an online station (and would later return to DAB and TV). Programming largely consisted of back-to-back music (with pre-recorded song introductions from Steve Harris), though Harris also hosted a live three-hour version of "The Edge" for the station on Friday nights. Following Harris' departure from Virgin (he joined Xfm London), the live show was axed and a new set of song introductions recorded by various Virgin Radio DJs were brought in. Xtreme survived the Absolute relaunch of October 2008, becoming Absolute Xtreme, but 4 December 2009 saw the station come off air, replaced on London's DAB platform and digital TV by Absolute Radio 80s. Listeners seeking alternative music were advised to switch to dabbl, though that service was not available on digital TV and was only on DAB in London in the evenings.

=== dabbl ===
Established in 2009 by the "One Golden Square Labs" research and development team within Absolute Radio, dabbl was an experimental user-controlled radio service. The dabbl platform operated 24 hours a day online at dabbl.co.uk – its first DAB outlet was in the nights-only (7pm to 6 am) slot on DRG London previously vacated by Virgin Radio Groove, though the 24-hour dabbl was subsequently made available on local DAB platforms in the Essex and Bristol/Bath/Wiltshire areas. The technology used allowed the station to be "interactive" – members of Absolute Radio's "VIP" online user community selected and voted for music to be played on the service. The music recordings played included a number of live session tracks and concert recordings. At the time of the closure of Absolute Xtreme, its listeners were advised to retune to dabbl for alternative music service. Following the initial experiment, dabbl ceased to broadcast as a radio station in summer 2010; its DAB slot outside London was taken up by Absolute Radio 90s. However, the technology which powered dabbl may be used in other ways in the future.

=== Liquid ===
Initially produced as a London showcase for Liquid FM, Virgin Radio's bid for the East Midlands FM licence, Liquid was a station playing indie-pop, alternative hits and Britpop. It launched on DAB in London in 2000 as part of the initial line-up of DRG London. Programmes were non-stop music during the day, but some specialist programmes were broadcast during evenings and weekends, predominantly presented by back-office Virgin Radio staff. Liquid closed in 2004; the previously online-only Virgin Radio Classic Rock (now Absolute Classic Rock) took its place on DAB.

=== Virgin 105.8 ===
Essentially, this service was a relay onto the Sky Digital platform (channel 0203) of the 105.8 FM Virgin Radio service available on FM in London. Programme content was the same as the MW service (already available on Sky 0107), with the split news, travel and advertising content of the London service. The relay began in June 2006 but was later stopped, with the slot on 0203 signed over to WRN, who operated it as "Ignition Radio" until the team at One Golden Square re-acquired the slot to provide Absolute Radio 90s. Ironically, the FM and MW services of Absolute Radio do now provide some split programme content (primarily football commentary) and had done in the past, but did not do so during the period that 105.8 was available in its own right on Sky.

=== Virgin Radio Groove ===
This station played Motown, soul and disco music. Originally named The Groove when launched to Switch London's DAB platform in 2000, the station was relabelled The Virgin Radio Groove in 2004 as part of moves to introduce the Virgin brand to the subsidiary stations (the change took place at around the time Liquid was replaced by Virgin Radio Classic Rock). Groove and Classic Rock were subsequently also made available via satellite TV. In September 2005, Virgin Radio Xtreme launched and took over the London DAB and digital TV platforms previously carrying Groove. However, Groove continued as an online-only service. In 2006, Groove returned to London's DAB offering, though this was in a mono, evenings-only slot on DRG London. Then, in June 2006, Groove returned to Sky's line-up 24 hours a day as part of an expansion of Virgin Radio's presence on the platform. In late 2007, ahead of the sale of Virgin Radio to TIML, it was announced that Virgin Radio Groove would be closed at the end of 2007. The official closure date was given as 31 December 2007, though an automated placeholder service continued until April 2008. Sky channel 0202 was taken on by WRN and subsequently leased to Jazz FM (UK), whilst the 7pm-6am DAB slot would later be used by dabbl.

=== Virgin Radio Party Classics ===
Launched on 15 June 2006, Virgin Radio Party Classics played party pop music. The radio station was based on Suggs' Virgin Party Classics show which was successfully running on the main Virgin Radio at the time. The service was similar to a previous online-only party music station that Virgin Radio had run in the early 2000s (known initially as "Virgin Radio Wheels of Steel" and, following John Revell's departure, "Virgin Radio Party!") Party Classics as a station was not available on DAB due to a lack of available slots in London; the service broadcast on the Sky Digital platform and online. Party Classics was added on Sky 0204 as part of a block of Virgin-operated stations added to the Sky radio guide. Programming on the Party Classics station consisted of simulcasts of the main station's party shows, and back-to-back music at other times. The Party Classics station closed down on Friday 13 October 2006. Its broadcast capacity on satellite was used to relocate the main Virgin Radio service (broadcast on 0107) as a cost-saving measure to reduce the number of satellite transponders Virgin Radio broadcast on. Party music continued on Virgin Radio for a time, but Absolute now broadcasts 80s, 90s and classic rock themed shows in weekend evening slots (these shows are largely simulcast on the relevant current digital channels).

=== Virgin Radio Viva (never launched) ===
Virgin Radio Viva was included as a station proposal when Channel 4 unveiled their 4 Digital Group bid for the proposed second national commercial DAB multiplex. Virgin Radio Viva would have been an upbeat melodic station aimed at 15- to 29-year-old women. However, Virgin Radio's then-owners SMG plc subsequently withdrew from the bid portfolio, as part of a scaling-back of the Virgin Radio operation in preparation for the sale of the station assets to TIML; this also led to the closure of Virgin Radio Groove as a non-core station in the portfolio. 4 Digital Group stated that they would seek a replacement service provider to take over the vacated slot. Although 4 Digital Group won the contract from Ofcom and were licensed to operate the DAB multiplex, Channel 4 later withdrew from the proposal on financial grounds, amid concern about future funding shortfalls as digital TV switchover approached; the proposed 4 Digital multiplex and its other new stations (such as Pure4 and Closer) ultimately never launched.
