= Absolute Radio 00s =

Coordinates: 51.512248°N 0.136937°W

- London; United Kingdom
- Frequencies: DAB: various DAB+: 12C (London)
- Branding: Absolute Radio Noughties

Programming
- Format: 2000s rock/pop
- Network: Absolute Radio Network

Ownership
- Owner: Bauer Radio
- Sister stations: Absolute Radio; Absolute Radio 60s; Absolute Radio 70s; Absolute Radio 80s; Absolute Radio 90s; Absolute Radio 10s; Absolute Radio 20s; Absolute Radio Classic Rock; Absolute Radio Country

History
- First air date: 10 December 2010

Links
- Webcast: Rayo
- Website: Absolute Radio 00s

Absolute Radio 00s is a national digital radio station owned and operated by Bauer as part of the Absolute Radio Network. It broadcasts locally on Bauer's Inverness DAB Multiplex. It broadcasts nationally via smart speaker streaming and online web streaming.

Absolute Radio 00s launched on 10 December 2010 on the Switch London DAB multiplex, replacing Absolute Radio 90s, which moved permanently to the national Digital One multiplex following a trial period.

In December 2014, Absolute 00s was withdrawn from DAB in London, as part of wider alterations, but simultaneously was made available, on a placeholder basis, on DAB in Inverness.

On 8 May 2020, the transmission of Absolute Radio 00s was temporarily suspended for 24 hours to allow the online capacity to be used for the one-day pop-up station Absolute Radio 40s, marking the 75th anniversary of VE Day, which also took over the AM frequencies of Absolute Radio for the day. The 40s pop-up was also added to the CE Digital London 1 multiplex as a DAB+ service.

== Simulcasts ==
As with Absolute's other digital spin-offs, Absolute Radio 00s simulcasts the Dave Berry breakfast show from the parent Absolute Radio station. In a change to how the breakfast show is simulcast, as with the other sister stations, Absolute Radio 00s now only features music from the 2000s during the breakfast show. As a promotion for the new station, during December 2010 Christian O'Connell would present an additional hour (10 am to 11 am) on the 00s station after the end of his main show.

From 23 September 2019, Absolute Radio's sibling stations, including 00s, began to syndicate the weekday afternoon drivetime show (then Hometime with Bush and Richie) from the main station; as at breakfast, a split playlist system will allow relevant music to be played on each station.

== Transmissions ==
The service is available, as of December 2014, on digital radio in Inverness, via the local DAB multiplex (Block 11B: 218.640 MHz) from the Mount Eagle transmitter.

Prior to December 2014, the station was available via digital radio to the Greater London area via the Switch London platform (12A - 223.936 MHz) via the following transmitter sites (transmitter power in brackets):

- Crystal Palace (2.10 kW)
- Bluebell Hill (2.00 kW)
- Reigate (1.51 kW)
- Guildford (1.00 kW)
- Zouches Farm (0.35 kW)
- Hemel Hempstead (0.25 kW)
- Otford (0.17 kW)
- Alexandra Palace (0.10 kW)
- Arkley (0.10 kW)
- Mount Vernon (0.10 kW)
- Stoke D'Aberdon (0.01 kW)
- Shooter's Hill - Thamesmead (0.01 kW)

The London DAB slot occupied by Absolute Radio 00s was initially occupied by The Groove (later Virgin Radio Groove), then by Virgin Radio Xtreme from September 2005; this was renamed Absolute Xtreme in 2008 and closed in 2009, replaced by Absolute Radio 80s; when the 80s service moved to Digital One, Absolute Radio 90s took the slot, and when the 90s service also went national, Absolute Radio 00s was launched.

In 2011 it was confirmed by Ofcom that to accommodate the launch of new sister station Absolute Radio 70s, the reduction of the broadcast bitrate of Absolute Radio 00s would be permitted, resulting in the station moving from stereo to mono broadcasts.

In December 2014, Absolute Radio 00s was removed from Switch London as part of a wider raft of changes to Bauer's DAB offerings. Absolute Radio 00s continues to be available nationally online as previously.

On 9 May 2020, a DAB+ broadcast of Absolute Radio 00s was made available to the London area over the CE London digital multiplex - the space for this was created the previous day (for the Absolute Radio 40s pop-up) by reducing the bandwidth allocated to the relay of Absolute Radio on the multiplex. From 28 April 2021, the broadcast of AR 00s on CE London switched from stereo DAB+ to a mono DAB service, using the capacity freed up by the removal of Absolute Radio from the multiplex two days prior. After three years in mono, AR 00s reverted to stereo DAB+ in April 2024 as part of measures to relocate Hits Radio London to the CE multiplex; this was followed in September 2024 by the addition of Absolute Radio 00s and Absolute Radio 10s to DAB in a number of areas around the UK, in many cases replacing other Bauer stations (chiefly, but not exclusively, those simulcast on Sound Digital in the DAB+ format).
