= Absolute Radio Country =

British country radio station

United Kingdom
- Broadcast area: United Kingdom
- Frequencies: DAB+: 11A Sound Digital (UK); Online: Planet Radio

Programming
- Format: Country
- Network: Absolute Radio Network

Ownership
- Owner: Bauer Radio
- Sister stations: Absolute Radio; Absolute Radio Classic Rock; Absolute Radio 60s Absolute Radio 70s Absolute Radio 80s Absolute Radio 90s Absolute Radio 00s Absolute Radio 10s Absolute Radio 20s

History
- First air date: 5 April 2019 (as Country Hits Radio); 17 May 2021 (as Absolute Radio Country)

Links
- Webcast: Rayo
- Website: Absolute Radio Country

Absolute Radio Country is a British digital radio station, and is owned and operated by Bauer Radio. It is available via DAB across the UK, online, on Smart Speaker and via the Rayo as part of the Absolute Radio Network.

== History ==
The station originally launched as Country Hits Radio on 5 April 2019 and was positioned as the UK's first national country music radio station. The station is focused on modern country music and is aimed at listeners of 25–44. RAJAR for Early 2020 puts the station on an average of 257k listeners per week. Absolute Radio Country is available on DAB in London, Birmingham, Manchester, Liverpool, Leeds, South Yorkshire, North Yorkshire, Lancashire, East Yorkshire, Tyne & Wear, Teesside, Glasgow, Edinburgh, Tayside, Inverness and Ayr. In 2021, it was also made available on digital radio in Bristol and Bournemouth.

In February 2021 Bauer revealed that the station would be renamed as Absolute Radio Country and made part of the Absolute Radio Network - the transition took place on 17 May 2021, in tandem with other changes to the availability of Absolute's digital stations. The first song to be played after the launch was "Jolene" by Dolly Parton, which was chosen by listeners via social media.

In June 2022, a sister station called Absolute Radio Classic Country was added to Bauer's Absolute Radio Premium subscription streaming package.

On 16 October 2023, Absolute Radio Country began broadcasting nationally on DAB+, broadcasting in stereo.

== Programming ==
Absolute Radio Country programming primarily comes from their studios in London as part of the Absolute Radio Network. From Sunday - Thursday from 7pm - 10pm, the station takes programming from Nashville country station WKDF.

Country music artists have also been guest hosts on the station, including Maddie & Tae, Tenille Townes, Elvie Shane, Sam Palladio, Brothers Osborne and Charles Esten.

== Presenters ==
- Dave Berry
- Ben Earle
- Baylen Leonard
- Lou Nash
- Jennie Longdon
- Kelly Sutton
- Andy Bush
- Richie Firth
- Elise Evans

== See also ==
- Downtown Radio
- Absolute Radio
- Absolute Radio Network
