= Absolute Radio 60s =

- London; United Kingdom
- Branding: Absolute Radio 60s

Programming
- Format: 1960s rock/pop
- Network: Absolute Radio Network

Ownership
- Owner: Bauer Radio
- Sister stations: Absolute Radio; Absolute Radio 70s; Absolute Radio 80s; Absolute Radio 90s; Absolute Radio 00s; Absolute Radio 10s; Absolute Radio 20s; Absolute Radio Classic Rock; Absolute Radio Country

History
- First air date: 22 November 2011

Links
- Webcast: Rayo
- Website: absoluteradio60s.co.uk

Absolute Radio 60s was a national Digital radio station in the United Kingdom owned and operated by Bauer as part of the Absolute Radio Network. It broadcasts locally on Bauer's 11B Inverness DAB Multiplex. It broadcasts nationally via Smart Speaker streaming and online web streaming. Its output is non-stop classic 1960s hits, followed by hits of the 1950s played alongside.

== History ==
Details of Absolute Radio's plan to extend its decade-themed radio stations were released in October 2010, following the success of Absolute Radio 80s and Absolute Radio 90s, the former of which was ranked eleventh in terms of listener numbers. Two new stations were announced on the same day, 18 October, Absolute Radio 60s and Absolute Radio 70s, both of which would be dedicated to the music of their respective decades. A holding website went live at absoluteradio60s.co.uk following the announcement, with basic information including the proposed station schedule. It was later revealed that Absolute Radio 60s would share some of the DAB multiplexes used by Absolute Classic Rock, with the latter reducing its broadcast capacity on each multiplex to make space available for Absolute Radio 60s. The 60s service began broadcasting from 22 November 2011 on various DAB multiplexes around the country and online. Absolute Radio 70s launched a week later. Upon its launch the station was more widely available than its 70s counterpart, airing on DAB in London, the north and west of England, and Scotland.

On 23 April 2013, the Radio Today website reported that Absolute Radio had removed Absolute Radio 60s and Absolute Classic Rock from several DAB platforms in England and Wales, but the stations continued to broadcast in London and online.

On 18 September 2014, it was reported that Absolute Radio 60s would be removed from London and the few other remaining local DAB multiplexes but would be added to Inverness DAB. The space freed up by this move was to allow Bauer to increase the coverage of its Kisstory station. This final reconfiguration of Absolute Radio 60s occurred on 5 January 2015.

In late 2020, following Bauer's acquisition of local FM and DAB services in Bradford, Swansea and Stoke-on-Trent from Wireless Group, Absolute Radio 60s and Absolute Radio 70s were added to local DAB in Stoke.

In July 2024, Kiss Fresh replaced Absolute Radio 60s in Inverness. Then, in September of that year, as part of wider changes to the Bauer station portfolio - including the launch of a new national 1960s music station, Greatest Hits Radio 60s on Sound Digital - Absolute Radio 60s and 70s were removed from the Stoke-on-Trent DAB multiplex lineup, replaced by Absolute Radio 00s and Absolute Radio 10s, and Absolute Radio 60s was made available on the Bauer-run multiplex for North Cumbria as a DAB+ station (this became the only remaining carriage of Absolute's 60s station over-the-air following its removal from Stoke and Inverness.).

In March 2025, Absolute Radio's 'listening guide' page was updated to state that Absolute Radio 60s would migrate from 31 March to be exclusively available via Bauer's 'Premium' subscription radio streaming package, (it is likely that this will see the station withdrawn from DAB+, as Bauer's Premium.) Absolute's other premium stations and Greatest Hits Radio 60s still remains available without subscription.

== Format ==
Although a separate entity, Absolute Radio 60s takes a limited amount of programming from the main Absolute Radio station, chiefly The Christian O'Connell Breakfast Show and the weekend programmes The Frank Skinner Show and Jason Manford. From 23 September 2019, weekday afternoon drivetime show Hometime with Bush and Richie has also been syndicated. The weekday shows are simulcast live, with weekend shows broadcast on a delay; all replace the music played with 1960s tracks using a split playlist system. Outside of these programmes, the station no longer has any regularly presented shows. Absolute 60s plays a broad mix of music from the decade, although it tends to be geared towards the genre of music heard on Absolute Radio. Tracks typically to be heard on the station include those from the Beatles, the Rolling Stones, the Velvet Underground and Motown. However, other bands and artists who enjoyed success during the 1960s, such as The Searchers and Cliff Richard are not included on the playlist. During an interview prior to the station's launch, Pete Mitchell, who would be presenting on Absolute Radio 60s, stressed that the station would not adopt a "gold" format, but would instead play tracks by those who had had an influence on the musicians of the present day. According to The Guardian the Absolute Radio 60s aim is to combine "the "swinging 60s" with "the sound of young America"."

== Cliff Richard ==
During the launch of Absolute 60s, it was announced that Cliff Richard would not be played on the station, according to presenter Pete Michell, because he "doesn't fit the cool sound of the swinging sixties we're trying to create on the new station" and he's not one of the 'timeless acts of the decade that remain relevant today.'

In response to this, Richard said the station "is lying to themselves and the public." He also stated that he sold more singles than The Beatles, and started five years before them as well.

On 16 November 2011, Geoff Lloyd (an original Absolute Radio drive presenter) posted a video on YouTube to explain this more systematically. He said that the music of The Rolling Stones, The Beatles and Motown "still resonates today" and when new bands are created today, "they're listening to those records and getting inspired", but that doesn't happen for Richard because "he has no artistic integrity or credibility" and he's just "a singer who sings other's materials."

== Absolute Radio Pirates ==
This was a day of programming on Absolute Radio 60s to coincide with anniversary of the offshore pirate radio stations being banned in the 1960s with the introduction of the Marine Broadcasting Offences Act 1967. Absolute Radio Pirates was a one-off broadcast on 12 August 2022, with original pirate presenters Tony Blackburn and Johnnie Walker joining Absolute's Leona Graham and Shaun Keaveny, plus radio historian David Lloyd. In addition, Absolute Radio Pirates repeated Tommy Vance’s Fabulous 40 from 6 August 1967 alongside other archive clips featuring Kenny Everett and The Beatles.

== See also ==
- Boom Radio – another station featuring Johnnie Walker and Tony Blackburn on a themed day to mark the anniversary of the Marine Broadcasting (Offences) Act 1967
- Sounds of the 60s – Tony Blackburn's weekly BBC Radio 2 programme
