= TIML Radio Limited =

TIML Radio Limited, was a wholly owned subsidiary of The Times Group, (who are the publishers of The Times of India and The Economic Times) were the owners of British radio stations Absolute Radio, Absolute 80s, Absolute 90s and Absolute Classic Rock prior to the groups sale to Bauer Media in 2013.
