= Virgin Radio Groove =

United Kingdom
- Frequencies: DAB+: Switch London; DAB: Switch Scotland

Programming
- Format: Rhythmic adult contemporary

Ownership
- Owner: Wireless Group
- Sister stations: Virgin Radio UK; Virgin Radio Anthems; Virgin Radio Chilled

History
- First air date: 21 January 2020
- Last air date: 1 June 2022

Links
- Website: www.virginradio.co.uk/groove

Virgin Radio Groove was a digital radio station in the UK, broadcasting on DAB and online and is a sister station to Virgin Radio UK.

== History ==
The original Virgin Radio Groove operated between 2000 and 2008, playing motown, soul and disco music. At the end of 2019, Wireless Group, which had taken up the Virgin Radio brand in the UK from 2016, revived the Virgin Radio Groove name as a new digital station, broadcasting upbeat music to London in DAB+ and central Scotland as a stereo standard DAB. The station replaced regional variants of Talksport on the Switchdigital multiplexes owned by Wireless. Like the existing Virgin Radio UK spin-offs – Virgin Radio Chilled and Virgin Radio Anthems – the station simulcasts the Chris Evans Breakfast Show, with its own programming at other times. Virgin Radio Groove officially began on 21 January 2020, with a 'takeover' stunt on the main station, the date chosen as it was the first anniversary of the launch of the Chris Evans Breakfast Show.

Presenters at launch included Bam.

The last day on air for the station was 1 June 2022.
