= Absolute Radio 10s =

Coordinates: 51.512248°N 0.136937°W

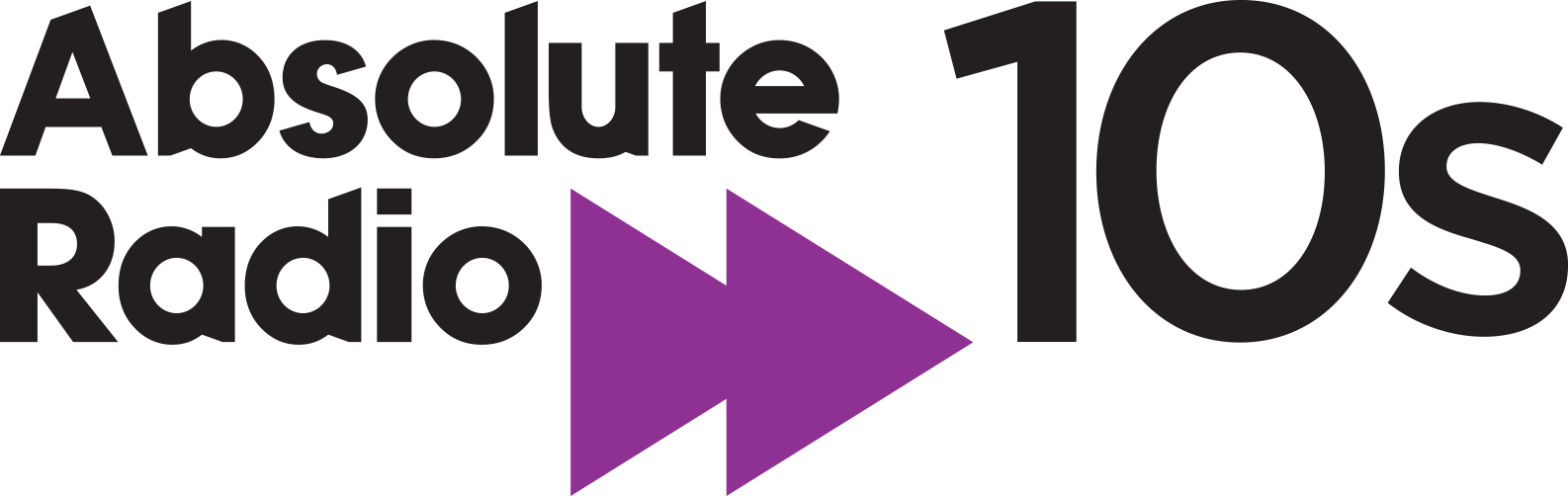

London; United Kingdom
- Frequencies: Online; Bauer Rayo App; DAB+: 12C (CE London); DAB: various
- Branding: Absolute Radio 10s

Programming
- Format: 2010s rock/pop
- Network: Absolute Radio Network

Ownership
- Owner: Bauer Radio
- Sister stations: Absolute Radio; Absolute Radio 60s; Absolute Radio 70s; Absolute Radio 80s; Absolute Radio 90s; Absolute Radio 00s; Absolute Radio 20s; Absolute Radio Classic Rock; Absolute Radio Country

History
- First air date: 18 November 2019

Links
- Webcast: Rayo
- Website: absoluteradio10s.co.uk

Absolute Radio 10s is a spin-off service from Absolute Radio. The station is a rolling music service which airs music from the period 2010–2019. It launched at 10.00am on 18 November 2019. It is the sixth decades themed station to be launched by Absolute's parent company, Bauer Radio, but unlike most of its sister stations, it launched exclusively online at launch.

Following an announcement that the service was to be made available in the DAB+ format in the London area from May 2021, Absolute Radio 10s began broadcasting in DAB+ on the CE London digital multiplex (co-owned by Bauer and Global) on 26 April 2021; at the same time the London feed of Absolute Radio was removed from CE (in preparation for the switch of the 105.8 FM frequency it relayed to Greatest Hits Radio in May).

In autumn 2024, alongside other changes to the Bauer portfolio, Absolute Radio 10s and Absolute Radio 00s were rolled out more widely on DAB, through their addition to various local-area digital radio multiplexes, largely in place of other existing Bauer stations.
