= Planet Rock (radio station) =

Coordinates: 51.512248°N 0.136937°W

- London; United Kingdom
- Frequency: DAB: 11A Sound Digital 12A (Switch London)

Programming
- Format: Classic/heavy rock

Ownership
- Owner: Bauer Media Audio UK
- Sister stations: Absolute Radio Classic Rock; Kerrang! Radio

History
- First air date: 15 November 1999; 26 years ago
- Former frequencies: 105.2 FM (West Midlands only)

Links
- Webcast: Rayo
- Website: Planet Rock

Planet Rock is a British digital radio station and network owned and operated by Bauer Media Audio UK. The station broadcasts classic rock music.

As of December 2024, the station has a weekly audience of 956,000 listeners according to RAJAR.

== Overview ==
The station was established in 1999, initially run by the GWR Group as part of the launch lineup of Digital One stations. Ahead of GCap's purchase by Global, the station was sold to Malcolm Bluemel's 'Rock Show' consortium in 2008, and from there was sold on to become part of Bauer Radio’s portfolio of brands in 2013.

Planet Rock is a digital-only service, transmitting on the DAB network (and through digital TV and online platforms). It is available nationally Online, and to some locations via DAB.

On 1 March 2016, Planet Rock ceased on national DAB, transferring to the part-national Sound Digital multiplex, losing transmission in Devon, Cornwall, parts of Scotland, Wales, East Anglia and other areas of the UK. Some of these areas regained access to the station with the introduction of additional transmitters to the SDL network in autumn 2018.

== History ==
Planet Rock was founded in 1999 as the only classic rock radio station in the UK at that time.

On 11 February 2008, the previous owner GCap Media (now Global Radio), announced that the station would close by 31 March 2008, along with sister station theJazz, unless a buyer was found. According to a statement by former presenter Fish, this was not due to the profitability of Planet Rock itself, which had been reported to be good, but rather to GCap's overall financial state. The station's relative popularity on digital radio brought controversy to the closure threat. Although theJazz ceased broadcasting on schedule, a campaign by listeners meant that a number of buyers expressed interest in Planet Rock, including a consortium publicly headed by Queen guitarist Brian May.

On 4 June 2008, the station was sold to a consortium led by Malcolm Bluemel and supported by Tony Iommi, Ian Anderson, Gary Moore, and Fish. There was no break in transmission and the programming remained unchanged.

On 25 September 2012, it was reported that Malcolm Bluemel was looking for a buyer for the station.

On 6 February 2013, the station was sold to Bauer Media for a deal worth between £1 million and £2 million.

On 23 May 2013, Bauer Media announced that the output of Planet Rock would become available on FM in the West Midlands on the frequency used by Kerrang! Radio in Birmingham from 14 June 2013. All programming now comes from London with the Birmingham studios closed and Kerrang! continuing in a different form on digital platforms.

From 8 am on 7 September 2015, the 105.2 FM frequency was taken over by Absolute Radio.

From 1 March 2016, Planet Rock moved from the Digital One DAB multiplex to the Sound Digital DAB multiplex. Devon, Cornwall, parts of Scotland and Wales and some other areas could not receive Planet Rock on the new multiplex. In late 2017/early 2018, new transmitters started at Pontop Pike and Ely, which widened the listening area of stations broadcasting via the Sound Digital ensemble. On 16 October 2023, Planet Rock converted to the DAB+ format, along with several other Bauer stations on SDL; this allowed Planet Rock to broadcast in stereo on digital radio again after a decade in mono, and freed up capacity which allowed sibling stations including Absolute Classic Rock and Kerrang! Radio to join the national lineup. A mono broadcast of Planet Rock was added to local DAB in certain areas at the same time, for the benefit of users of older receivers not compatible with DAB+.

It promotes and runs its own events, notably 'Rockstock', an indoor rock festival. In 2017, Planet Rock launched its own magazine, also called Planet Rock, as a replacement for Kerrang! in Bauer's portfolio of music magazines. The magazine was edited by Paul Brannigan and was published once every two months until 2020, when it was decided that a number of titles (such as Q) would be sold on to other publishers, with Planet Rock magazine closing so the brand could be kept by Bauer for the radio station.

On 13 December 2023, Planet Rock was removed from Freesat, Sky and Virgin Media TV platform, along with every other radio station owned by Bauer Media on either of the three platforms, including Absolute Radio, Absolute Radio 80s, Absolute Radio 90s, Absolute Radio Classic Rock, Hits Radio, Greatest Hits Radio, Kiss, Magic and Jazz FM.

== Notable presenters ==
Since 2006 Planet Rock has featured a number of rock star presenters, who have either fronted limited-run series or hosted long running weekly or monthly shows.

The syndicated Alice Cooper radio show was edited in the UK for a breakfast audience as the Breakfast With Alice Cooper show, which ran in the 6 – 9 am slot until 17 January 2011 when his show became Nights With Alice Cooper. With the cessation of the syndicated Alice Cooper programme in September 2023, Planet Rock replaced it with UK-produced shows hosted by Ian Danter and Jen Thomas.

Presenters include Def Leppard singer Joe Elliott, who has presented a weekly Saturday evening show at 5 pm since June 2010; Thunder singer Danny Bowes presents a weekly show every Sunday from 10 am - 12 pm; Duff McKagan of Guns N' Roses and Susan Holmes McKagan, who present a weekly show on Saturdays at 7 pm; and former Little Angels and current Wayward Sons frontman Toby Jepson on Sunday afternoons from 5 - 7 pm.

Other presenters who have hosted shows on Planet Rock include: Rick Wakeman hosted a Saturday morning show for five years until December 2010; Gary Moore hosted the Blues Power series in 2008; Black Sabbath's Tony Iommi presented two series of Black Sunday for the station; Jethro Tull singer Ian Anderson presented a series called Under The Influence; Roxy Music guitarist Phil Manzanera presented two series for the station in 2007 and 2009 which looked at influential guitar players and guitar playing styles; Former Marillion frontman Fish hosted two series of Fish On Fridays; Thin Lizzy guitarist Scott Gorham hosted one series which aired in 2010; Europe singer Joey Tempest hosted a series on Sunday evenings until early 2011; Francis Rossi of Status Quo hosted a thirteen-part series until June 2011; Al Murray hosted on Sunday mornings until 2015; and the Hairy Bikers' Hairy Rock Show ran on Sundays from 2015 - 2020.
