= CE Digital =

British DAB multiplex operator

CE Digital is an operator of three digital radio ensembles in England.

CE Digital is a joint venture between Bauer Media Group and Global Media & Entertainment, and was originally a joint venture between Capital Radio and Emap Radio.

The company was originally formed as a joint venture between British media conglomerates Capital Radio plc (later Global) and Emap Radio (later Bauer Radio).

== Licences ==
Area	Award date	Frequency	Services commenced
Birmingham	6 May 1999	11C (223.352 MHz)	31 May 2000
Manchester	3 June 1999	12C (227.360 MHz)	31 May 2000
London	2 September 1999	12C (227.360 MHz)	31 May 2000

== See also ==
- DRG London
- Switch London
