= Absolute Radio 20s =

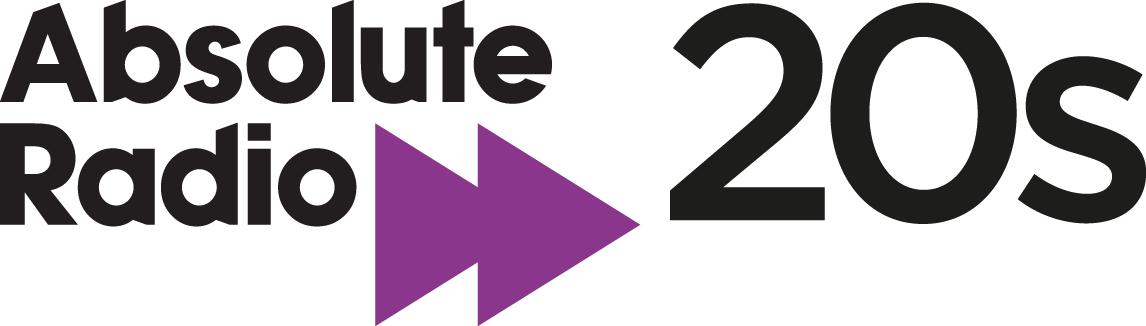

Carlisle; United Kingdom
- Frequencies: DAB+: 11B (North Cumbria); Bauer PlanetRadio App

Programming
- Format: Contemporary rock/pop

Ownership
- Owner: Bauer Radio
- Sister stations: Absolute Radio; Absolute Radio 60s; Absolute Radio 70s; Absolute Radio 80s; Absolute Radio 90s; Absolute Radio 00s; Absolute Radio 10s; Absolute Radio Classic Rock; Absolute Radio Country

History
- First air date: 24 February 2020

Links
- Webcast: Planet Radio
- Website: planetradio.co.uk/absolute-radio-20s/

Absolute Radio 20s is a spin-off UK-based radio station from Absolute Radio. It launched at 10.00am on 24 February 2020 and operated solely online until being made available as a DAB+ service, alongside multiple other Bauer-run stations, on the new local digital multiplex for Cumbria in December 2021. It is the seventh decades themed station to be launched by Absolute's owner, Bauer Radio.

The station plays rock and alternative music from both emerging and established artists and groups and has the strapline of "new music matters." The first song to be played on the station was "Instant History" by Biffy Clyro. Presenters include Danielle Perry and Jay Lawrence.
