= Absolute Radio 90s =

Coordinates: 51.512248°N 0.136937°W

London; United Kingdom
- Frequency: DAB+: 11A Sound Digital (UK)
- Branding: Absolute 90s

Programming
- Format: 1990s rock/pop
- Network: Absolute Radio Network

Ownership
- Owner: Bauer Radio
- Sister stations: Absolute Radio; Absolute Radio 60s; Absolute Radio 70s; Absolute Radio 80s; Absolute Radio 00s; Absolute Radio 10s; Absolute Radio 20s; Absolute Radio Classic Rock; Absolute Radio Country

History
- First air date: 21 June 2010

Links
- Webcast: Rayo
- Website: www.absoluteradio90s.co.uk

Absolute Radio 90s is a semi-national digital radio station owned and operated by Bauer as part of the Absolute Radio Network. Its output is non-stop 1990s hits.

The station launched on DAB in London in June 2010 and on the Digital One platform on 25 August 2010 and was initially available for one month as a "test". However, the availability of the station nationally continued beyond the end of September, and after a strong opening RAJAR figure, it was confirmed that the 90s service would continue to be available on Digital One. It remained on that multiplex until January 2015, when its slot was given over to Magic. Ahead of this change Absolute 90s began appearing on a number of local DAB ensembles from 12 December 2014, replacing Kerrang! Radio in many cases. Absolute 90s continues to broadcast nationally via satellite TV and online, and on 29 January 2018 the station went nationwide on DAB.

== Background ==
The station was announced in May 2010 when Absolute Radio 80s launched on the Digital One national multiplex.

== Launch ==
The service was launched on 21 June 2010 by Christian O'Connell at 10 am with the Oasis song "Roll With It" the first song played on the station. It was then followed by a 90s mixtape.

Like its other digital spin-offs, Absolute Radio 90s also carries the Dave Berry breakfast show from Absolute Radio. During the 2013 season, Absolute Radio 90s was the UK's broadcaster of NFL (American football) games, taking over in that capacity from BBC Radio 5 Live Sports Extra. (Absolute Radio abandoned NFL broadcasts in 2014.)

== Availability ==
The service, which took over the slots previously used by Absolute Radio 80s, was available in London on the Switch Digital multiplex. The station replaced dabbl in Bristol, Essex, London, Newbury, Reading, Swindon and Cardiff. The service is also available on Sky (channel 0203).

Absolute Radio 90s launched on the Digital One platform in August 2010, initially as a test due to run until 30 September 2010. This used the broadcast capacity of Absolute Radio Extra during that station's downtime. The trial was subsequently extended, and in November 2010 it was confirmed that the station would remain on Digital One, sharing with Extra as before, on a permanent basis, and that a new station, Absolute Radio 00s ("Noughties") would launch on DAB in London in December (in the former 90s slot). As a result of its national launch Absolute Radio 90s has now also been removed from the other local DAB multiplexes it broadcast on (Absolute Classic Rock took over the slot on the Cardiff local multiplex).

As a result of sharing its Digital One slot with Absolute Radio Extra, Absolute Radio 90s was off-air on DAB between 1:30 pm and 6:30 pm on Saturdays. However, the digital TV and internet broadcasts of the 90s station were uninterrupted and continuous throughout this period. Following the closure of Absolute Radio Extra, Absolute Radio 90s regained a full uninterrupted service on all platforms.

At the end of 2017, Absolute Radio 90s resumed transmitting nationally on Digital One, taking the place of temporary station Magic Christmas, and so during 2018 had dual illumination on local and national tier. In February 2019, as part of the reorganisation of DAB capacity required ahead of the launch of Scala Radio, Absolute Radio 90s began transmitting on SDL National (taking the place of Heat Radio) with its other slots vacated, the Digital One slot going to Kisstory and local-tier slots to Magic Chilled, both of which in turn gave up their SDL capacity to Scala.

On 16 October 2023, Absolute Radio 90s switched to DAB+ broadcasting in stereo.

On 13 December 2023, Absolute Radio 90s was removed from Sky, along with every other radio station owned by Bauer Media on the TV platform, including Absolute Radio, Absolute Radio 80s, Absolute Radio Classic Rock, Hits Radio, Greatest Hits Radio, Kiss, Magic, Jazz FM and Planet Rock.
