= Radio Today (website) =

British radio industry news

Radio Today is a UK-based website providing news, features, photos and reviews related to the radio industry in the United Kingdom. RadioToday.co.uk was founded by Roy Martin, and receives in excess of 3,500 unique visitors each day. In addition, the site has a database of over 10,000 subscribers who receive daily and weekly emails.

In September 2007, the site became an associate sponsor of the European Radio Awards, giving its name to the event's Best Internet Radio award. In November 2011, Radio Today published a preview edition of Radio Today: The Magazine, with plans to launch it as a monthly magazine from 2012. The edition was distributed to delegates at the 2011 Radio Festival.
