= Absolute Radio 70s =

- London; United Kingdom
- Frequencies: DAB: 11B Bauer Tayside; 12A Switch London; 12D Bauer Stoke And Stafford
- Branding: Absolute 70s

Programming
- Format: 1970s rock/pop
- Network: Absolute Radio Network

Ownership
- Owner: Bauer Radio
- Sister stations: Absolute Radio; Absolute Radio 60s; Absolute Radio 80s; Absolute Radio 90s; Absolute Radio 00s; Absolute Radio 10s; Absolute Radio 20s; Absolute Radio Classic Rock; Absolute Radio Country

History
- First air date: 29 November 2011

Links
- Webcast: Rayo
- Website: absoluteradio70s.co.uk

Absolute Radio 70s is a national Digital radio station owned and operated by Bauer as part of the Absolute Radio Network. It broadcasts locally to parts of the UK on DAB radio multiplexes. It broadcasts nationally via Smart Speaker and online web streaming. Its output is non-stop 1970s hits.

== History ==
Details of Absolute Radio's plan to extend their decade-themed radio stations were released in October 2010, and following the success of Absolute Radio 80s and Absolute Radio 90s, the former of which was ranked eleventh in terms of listener numbers. Two new stations were announced, Absolute Radio 60s and Absolute Radio 70s, both of which would be dedicated to the music of their respective decades. Initially the 70s station would be available on DAB in London only, but would be accessible nationally and internationally through an online service. A website holding page was opened at absoluteradio70s.co.uk in line with the announcement of the station, which carries station information and an indicative schedule. The 60s service went on air on 22 November 2011, with Absolute Radio 70s launching a week later on 29 November.

Absolute Radio 70s shares the DAB slot currently used by Absolute Radio 00s, with 00s cutting its broadcast capacity (and switching to broadcast in mono) to release space for the 70s service.

At the time of its launch Absolute Radio 70s branded itself as "The UK's only 70s radio station", but was joined on DAB within a few weeks by Smooth 70s, a similarly themed station from GMG Radio which was launched nationally on DAB on 27 December 2011. However, in spite of its competitor, Absolute 70s continued to style itself as the UK's only 1970s-themed radio station. Smooth 70s subsequently ceased transmission on 6 October 2013, and its national frequency was taken over by Capital XTRA. Six years later, Global resumed transmission of a national 70s music service with the launch of Heart 70s, which is now Absolute 70s' chief competitor (other stations, such as Pirate 70s have existed in the interim, but generally to a smaller broadcast area - in Pirate's case, Cornwall).

== Format ==
Although a separate entity, Absolute Radio 70s takes a limited amount of programming from the main Absolute Radio station, chiefly The Dave Berry Breakfast Show and The Frank Skinner Show. Hometime with Bush and Richie was added to the schedule of Absolute's digital stations from 23 September 2019. The station itself was originally fronted by former Radio 1 presenter Richard Skinner, who presented an afternoon programme. Following the station's 2018 downgrading, there were no presenters outside of shows shared with Absolute Radio and some specials; in summer 2019, former Gold breakfast presenter Tony Dibbin joined Bauer to present a weekday daytime show on Absolute Radio 70s, which became the only presented programme exclusive to the 70s station.

Absolute 70s plays a broad mix of music from the 1970s, ranging from rock and punk to glam and soul. Artists and groups typically heard on the station include David Bowie, Kate Bush, Elton John and Blondie.

== Distribution ==
The station's DAB transmission was originally solely to London, in contrast to the wider distribution of its siblings, and the 70s station was not affected by the December 2014/January 2015 changes which impacted many of Absolute's other digital transmissions including those of Absolute Radio 60s.

Absolute Radio 70s has been made available more widely through online transmission via Absolute's website and apps, where it appears alongside the other Absolute network stations.

The 70s service was made available nationally via digital satellite television from 9 February 2015, when the station took over a Sky guide slot previously occupied by Insight Radio; it joins Absolute's 80s, 90s and Classic Rock stations on the Sky lineup. Although Absolute Radio 70s was not guide-listed on Freesat, it could be manually tuned into by Freesat boxes. The station was removed from Sky on 4 June 2018, and was replaced by Hits Radio.

May 2018 also saw the station, and Kerrang! Radio, removed from London DAB to release space for the addition of Hits Radio; the stations were kept active by relocating to Bauer's Tayside DAB multiplex - a similar 'placeholder' move had shifted DAB transmission of Absolute's 60s and 00s stations to Inverness as part of the 2014/15 reshuffle (00s having previously been broadcast in London alongside the 70s service.)

In early 2021 it was announced that, as part of wider alterations to the Absolute Radio Network's distribution, including Absolute Radio's withdrawal from FM in London and the relaunch of Country Hits Radio as Absolute Radio Country, that Absolute Radio 70s would, along with Absolute Radio 10s, be made available to listeners in London in the DAB+ format from May of that year. On 26 April 2021, a broadcast of AR70s began, in mono using the DAB standard, on the Switch London multiplex from which it had been removed three years prior, with Hits Radio London reducing its bitrate to accommodate the addition - this effectively partly reverses the change made in 2018, when space previously used by AR70s went towards the addition of Hits. In the early hours of 28 April 2021, the mono service was replaced by a stereo DAB+ transmission.

== See also ==
- 1970s nostalgia
