= Sound Digital =

National commercial digital radio multiplex in the United Kingdom

- Licensed area: United Kingdom
- Frequency: 11A (216.928 MHz)
- Air date: 29 February 2016
- Owner: Arqiva (40%); Bauer Media Group (30%); News Broadcasting (30%)

Sound Digital, also known as SDL National, is a semi-national commercial digital radio multiplex in the United Kingdom, owned by Arqiva, Bauer Media Group and News Broadcasting. The multiplex covers 73% of the population from a total of 45 transmitters.

== History ==
Following the collapse of the winning 4 Digital Group bid for the second national ensemble in 2008, the capacity was re-advertised in 2014. Two bids were received, Sound Digital and Listen2Digital, a consortium run by Orion Media and Babcock International Group. On 27 March 2015, Sound Digital were selected as the winner.

Between award and launch, Premier Praise and Panjab Radio, a Listen2Digital station, joined the line up along with DAB+ stations Fun Kids and Magic Chilled. Also, BMR and UCB Inspirational were rebranded Awesome Radio and UCB2 respectively and TalkBusiness was replaced by Listen2Digital station Share Radio.

Test transmission commenced in February 2016, which consisted of Sound Waves and Sound Waves+ for DAB and DAB+ respectively. An official launch took place on 29 February, with the majority of stations launching on this date and the remainder following over the next month.

On 15 May 2018, Sound Digital announced the planned introduction of additional 19 transmitters – to improve coverage in the South West, East Anglia, Wales and North of Scotland – increasing the multiplex's coverage to 83%, adding nearly 4 million new listeners in more than 1.6m new households.

In September 2023 Bauer announced that Mellow Magic, Planet Rock, Scala Radio, Absolute 80s and Absolute 90s would transition to DAB+ from that October, freeing up capacity for the addition of Absolute Radio Country, Absolute Classic Rock, Magic Chilled, Magic Soul, Magic at the Musicals, Heat Radio and Kerrang! Radio to the Sound Digital lineup.

Sound Digital is expanding its national DAB network with 32 additional transmitter sites, bringing its 30 radio services to more than 1.1 million extra households as well as improving reception across more than 950 miles of motorway, trunk and A roads in England, Scotland and Wales. Sound Digital says that this will be completed by Easter 2027.

== Stations carried ==
=== DAB ===
Service	Service ID	Bit rate	Audio channels	Description	DAB launch date
Fix Radio	CDDA	64 kbit/s	Mono LSF	Station for the building trade	3 May 2022
Premier Christian Radio	CCD8	64 kbit/s	Mono LSF	Christian music and speech	27 March 2016
Premier Praise!	CDD8	64 kbit/s	Mono LSF	Sister station to Premier Christian Radio	27 March 2016
Sunrise Radio	C9D8	56 kbit/s	Mono	Asian music and speech programmes	29 February 2016
Times Radio	C0D8	64 kbit/s	Mono	News and culture	29 June 2020
Virgin Radio UK	C3D8	80 kbit/s	Mono	Rock/pop music	30 March 2016

=== DAB+ ===
Service	Service ID	Bit rate	Audio channels	Description	DAB+ launch date
Absolute Radio 80s	C8D8	32 kbit/s	Stereo HE-AAC v2	80s music	16 October 2023
Absolute Radio 90s	CAC2	32 kbit/s	Stereo HE-AAC v2	90s music	16 October 2023
Absolute Radio Classic Rock	C7C9	32 kbit/s	Stereo HE-AAC v2	Classic rock music	16 October 2023
Absolute Radio Country	CCE7	32 kbit/s	Stereo HE-AAC v2	Country music	16 October 2023
Boom Radio UK	C5EF	24 kbit/s	Mono HE-AAC v1	Pop music	13 March 2021
BFBS UK	C5E0	24 kbit/s	Stereo HE-AAC v2	Armed forces radio	24 January 2018
Capital Anthems	CAFC	32 kbit/s	Stereo HE-AAC v2	Contemporary hit radio	12 September 2024
Capital Xtra Reloaded	CCE9	40 kbit/s	Stereo HE-AAC v2	Non-stop old skool	24 October 2022
Greatest Hits Radio 60s	CFFA	32 kbit/s	Stereo HE-AAC v2	1960s music	16 September 2024
Hits Radio Chilled	CEE6	32 kbit/s	Stereo HE-AAC v2	"Laid-back" pop and R&B from 90s to now	16 October 2023
Jazz FM	CAD7	32 kbit/s	Stereo HE-AAC v2	Jazz music	29 February 2016
Kerrang! Radio	C6CF	32 kbit/s	Stereo HE-AAC v2	Rock music	16 October 2023
Kisstory R&B	CFF9	32 kbit/s	Stereo HE-AAC v2	Rhythm and blues	16 September 2024
Magic at the Musicals	CAEA	32 kbit/s	Stereo HE-AAC v2	Showtunes and soundtracks	16 October 2023
Magic Classical	CDE6	32 kbit/s	Stereo HE-AAC v2	Classical	16 October 2023
Magic Soul	C3D9	32 kbit/s	Stereo HE-AAC v2	Soul, funk and disco	16 October 2023
Mellow Magic	C5D8	32 kbit/s	Stereo HE-AAC v2	Relaxing and melodic music	16 October 2023
Planet Rock	C7D8	32 kbit/s	Stereo HE-AAC v2	Classic rock radio	16 October 2023
Radio X Classic Rock	C5F6	32 kbit/s	Stereo HE-AAC v2	Classic Rock music	16 February 2023
Smooth 80s	CAFB	32 kbit/s	Stereo HE-AAC v2	1980s music	12 September 2024
Talkradio	CAEB	32 kbit/s	Stereo HE-AAC v2	Talk Radio (Right-Wing News)	9 June 2020
TalkSport 2	C1D8	32 kbit/s	Stereo HE-AAC v2	Specialist shows, documentaries, and live sport commentary	9 June 2020
Virgin Chilled	C836	32 kbit/s	Stereo HE-AAC v2	Chilled Pop Music	22 December 2018
Virgin Legends	C736	32 kbit/s	Stereo HE-AAC v2	Classic Rock/Pop Music	22 December 2018

== Former services ==
Services previously carried on the multiplex include:

- Awesome Radio - never fully launched, promo barker ran from launch of SDL until removal in August 2017
- Capital (Taylor's Version) - temporary station during summer 2024 to coincide with the Eras Tour
- Capital Chill - added 13 February 2023, removed 12 September 2024 to make way for Capital Anthems
- Fun Kids - removed 31 August 2023. However the station continues to broadcast on local DAB multiplexes in selected areas of the UK.
- Heat Radio - removed February 2019; re-added as a DAB+ station along with other Bauer stations 16 October 2023; removed again 16 September 2024 to make way for Kisstory R&B
- JACK Radio - replaced by Union JACK Dance in December 2020
- Kisstory - moved to Digital One in February 2019
- Love Sport - removed late 2020
- Panjab Radio - moved to local DAB in December 2019
- Share Radio - moved to online-only service May 2017
- UCB2 - moved to Digital One as a DAB+ service in March 2022
- Union JACK - launched on 9 September 2016, removed on 24 February 2022
- Union JACK Dance - launched on 10 December 2020, removed on 24 February 2022
- Union JACK Rock - launched on 10 December 2020, removed on 24 February 2022

== See also ==
- BBC National DAB
- Digital One
