= Dave Berry (presenter) =

British TV and radio presenter

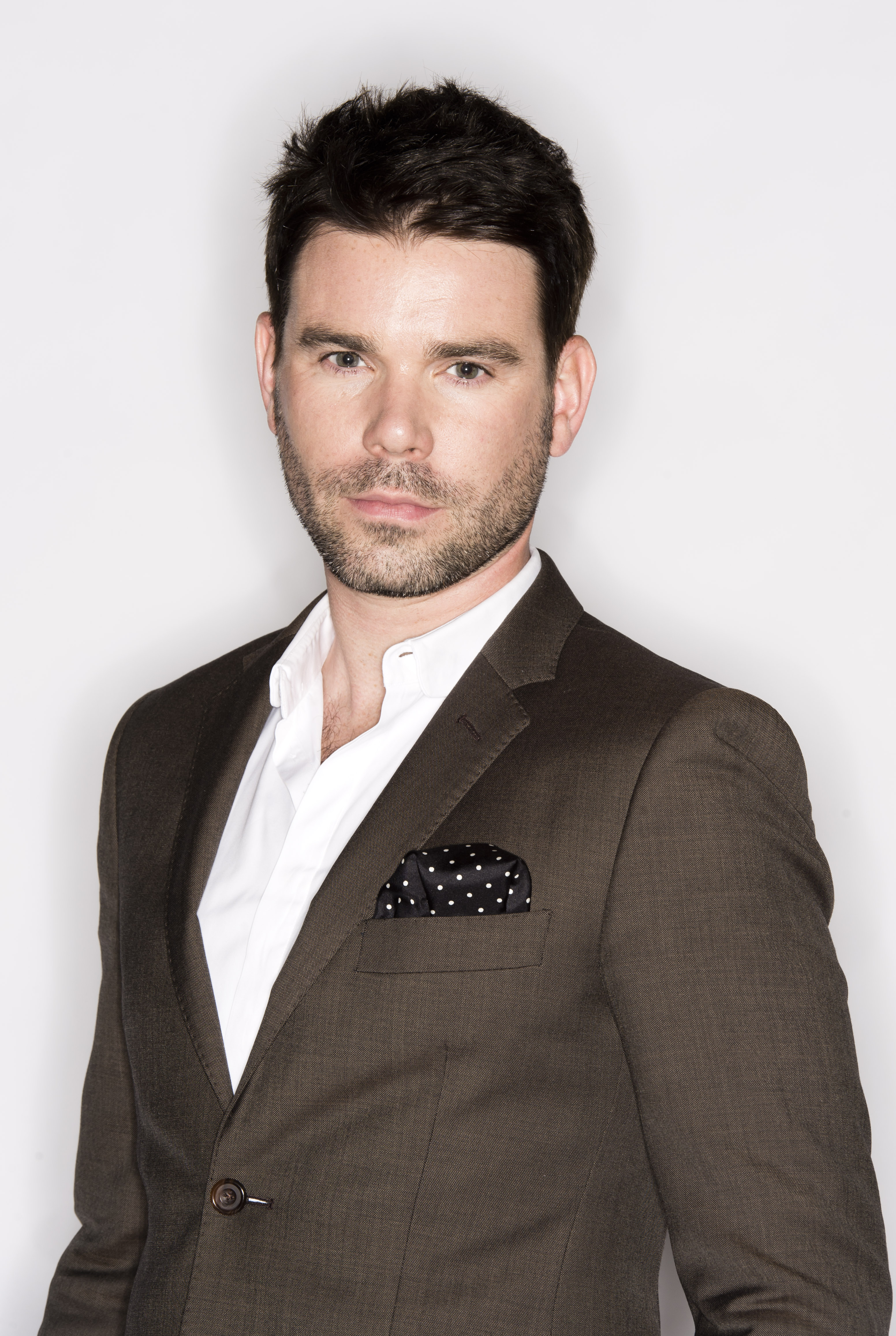
- Born: David Robert Berry; 14 September 1978 (age 48); Lewisham, London, England
- Occupations: Radio DJ, TV presenter
- Years active: Late 1990s–present
- Employer: Absolute Radio
- Spouse: Sarah-Jane Davies (m. 2018)
- Children: 1

David Robert Berry (born 14 September 1978 in Lewisham, London) is a British TV and radio presenter. Berry currently hosts the Absolute Radio Breakfast Show, every weekday from 6am. He previously presented The Capital Breakfast Show from 2012 until 2017, alongside Lisa Snowdon, George Shelley and Lilah Parsons.

== Career ==
=== Tailoring ===
Berry began work in 'The Observatory', a South London vintage clothes shop. He joined a modelling agency where he participated in campaigns for Ted Baker, French Connection, Toni & Guy and Burton. In 2009 he co-founded 'October House', a tailoring brand making bespoke suits from British fabrics. Clients include David Gandy, Scott Parker, Miles Kane, Mark Cavendish, Jamie Scallion and Johnny Harris. Berry reportedly wore a three piece suit while presenting the Capital Breakfast Show.

=== Television ===
In 2001, Dave Berry started presenting Nickelodeon's music chart show "N-List" alongside Kelle Bryan. From 2008 until 2014, Berry presented episodes of The Hot Desk on ITV2. He co-presented the 2012 series Beat TV on ITV2 alongside Laura Whitmore and Darren McMullen. Since 2013, Berry has been a regular panellist on Keith Lemon's Through the Keyhole on ITV. He has also been a regular reporter on Holly Willoughby's Surprise Surprise.

Berry presented Soccer Aid: Extra Time in 2010 and again in 2012.

He presented the show Takeaway My Takeaway on Channel 4. He has been nominated for a Rose D'Or Award, Broadcast Award and a BAFTA award.

=== Radio ===
Berry's radio career began on Capital Radio in 2007 where he presented the Saturday afternoon show. Soon after, he was employed by alternative indie rock station XFM whose previous presenters include Ricky Gervais, Stephen Merchant, Simon Pegg, Jimmy Carr and Russell Brand. He hosted the Dave Berry Saturday Show for 12 weeks, the drivetime show for almost two years, and the XFM Breakfast Show which achieved some of XFM's highest RAJAR figures.

On 15 April 2011 he left XFM to present the weekend breakfast show on Capital Radio (now known as Capital London).

On 25 December 2011, he presented his final weekend Capital London, after the announcement that he would replace Johnny Vaughan on Capital Breakfast (London) on 3 January 2012. He hosted the Capital Breakfast (London) show every weekday morning from 6am - 10am with a national broadcast across the Capital network on Saturdays.

Berry has won the Radio Academy Gold Award for Breakfast Show of the Year and is a two-time winner of the TRIC Award for Best Radio/ Digital Radio Programme.

In April 2017, Berry left Capital and subsequently has been replaced on the Capital Breakfast (London) show by Roman Kemp. He began presenting 4-7pm on Absolute Radio from 2 October 2017 with his co-host Matt Dyson. Berry also presented a 7-10pm show on Absolute Radio's sister station Absolute Radio 90s every Monday-Thursday. In March 2018, it was confirmed that Berry would replace Christian O'Connell as the host of the Absolute Radio Breakfast Show. Berry began presenting the Absolute Radio Breakfast Show on 4 June 2018 where he was joined by Dyson and the show's newsreaders Glenn Moore and Emma Jones. As of October 2019, The Dave Berry Breakfast Show had 2.2 million listeners, a record for the station.

Berry continues to host the flagship Dave Berry Breakfast Show every weekday morning from 6am across the Absolute Radio network, with the broadcast now streaming via Bauer Media's updated Rayo audio platform. The show's on-air lineup has seen significant updates; long-term travel presenter Emma Jones departed the program in late 2025, and award-winning broadcaster Rich Williams subsequently joined the morning team alongside Berry, Matt Dyson, and Andrea Fox.

=== Podcasts ===
Berry's show on Absolute Radio is also released daily as a podcast under the title The Dave Berry Breakfast Show.

In 2019, Berry launched the podcast Dave Berry's DadPod for Bauer Media Group, discussing the topic of parenthood with guests including John Thomson, Rob Beckett and Emma Willis. The first series of 6 episodes premiered in October 2019, and was selected as a UK Pick of the Month by Spotify.

Berry has also appeared regularly on the Empire podcast.

=== Journalism ===
Berry regularly contributes to The Guardian, and contributed to HuffPost in July 2012 and again in 2016-2017. He has also contributed to The Daily Telegraph, Q, and Empire.

== Personal life ==
Berry married charity Communications and Marketing Consultant Sarah-Jane Davies in March 2018. He was engaged to Sugababes singer Heidi Range, but the engagement was called off. In 2012 he was appointed ambassador for the Charlton Athletic Community Trust. He is ambassador for YouCan Youth Cancer Support which operates in London, Kent and the south east, and Balls To Cancer - a Midland's based charity raising awareness for male cancer.

He stated in The Guardian that a disastrous, bleeding tattoo at 17 was a 'moment that changed me'.

On 28 August 2018, Berry announced on his Absolute Radio breakfast show that he and Davies were expecting their first child. Their daughter Evangeline was born in December 2018.
