= Absolute Radio 80s =

Coordinates: 51.512248°N 0.136937°W

- London; United Kingdom
- Frequency: DAB+: 11A Sound Digital (UK)
- Branding: Absolute 80s

Programming
- Format: 1980s rock/pop
- Network: Absolute Radio Network

Ownership
- Owner: Bauer Radio
- Sister stations: Absolute Radio; Absolute Radio 60s; Absolute Radio 70s; Absolute Radio 90s; Absolute Radio 00s; Absolute Radio 10s; Absolute Radio 20s; Absolute Radio Classic Rock; Absolute Radio Country

History
- First air date: 6 December 2009

Links
- Webcast: Rayo
- Website: www.absolute80s.com

Absolute Radio 80s (known on-air as Absolute 80s) is a national digital radio station, owned and operated by Bauer as part of the Absolute Radio Network. Its main output is non-stop 1980s hits.

== History ==
Absolute Radio 80s launched at 7.00 pm on 4 December 2009, replacing Absolute Xtreme.

The marketing plan for Absolute 80s started with targeted sampling at 80s events such as Madness, Pet Shop Boys and Depeche Mode at the O2 Arena, Erasure at the NEC Birmingham and Simple Minds at the Wembley Arena. The first track to play on the station was "(You Gotta) Fight for Your Right (To Party!)" by the Beastie Boys.

On 14 May 2010, Absolute 80s began broadcasting in mono at 64 kbit/s on Digital One national DAB digital radio.

On 29 February 2016, the station switched to the newly launched Sound Digital multiplex (an "upgrade" to 80 kbit/s in mono) although it continued to broadcast on Digital One until the end of April 2016.

On 16 October 2023, Absolute 80s switched to DAB+ broadcasting in stereo.

On 12 December 2023, Absolute Radio 80s was removed from Freesat, followed by Sky and Virgin Media on 13 December, along with every other radio station owned by Bauer Media on either of the three TV platforms.

== Presenters ==
The station's presenters include Leona Graham, Sarah Champion, Richie Firth and Chris Martin.

Absolute 80s also simulcasts Absolute Radio's breakfast (Dave Berry) and drivetime shows, using a split playlist system which allows relevant music to be played on each Absolute station.

Former presenters include ex-Spandau Ballet lead singer Tony Hadley, who presented a Saturday evening 80s Party show until December 2019.
