= News Broadcasting =

Radio broadcasting company

News UK Broadcasting Limited
- Trade name: News Broadcasting
- Formerly: UTV Media, Wireless Group Limited
- Company type: Subsidiary
- Industry: Broadcasting
- Founded: 1959; 67 years ago (UTV); 1998; 28 years ago (The Wireless Group, previously TalkCo)
- Headquarters: Belfast, Northern Ireland, UK
- Area served: Most of UK
- Key people: Scott Taunton (Chief Executive)
- Parent: News UK & Ireland Ltd.
- Website: www.news.co.uk/latest-news/welcome-to-news-broadcasting/

News UK Broadcasting Limited, trading as News Broadcasting (formerly Wireless Group Limited and UTV Media plc), is a radio and digital broadcasting network with headquarters in Belfast, Northern Ireland. It currently operates five stations in Ireland and 18 in the United Kingdom. The company was formerly known as UTV Media, owned by UTV Television. Its television broadcasting services were sold to ITV plc in February 2016 and its radio, sales services and websites were spun off into a new company, Wireless, later purchased by News Corp.

In June 2016, Rupert Murdoch's News Corp reached an agreement to buy the company. The sale was completed in September 2016. Prior to the acquisition, Wireless Group was a constituent of the FTSE SmallCap Index.

== History ==
=== Background ===
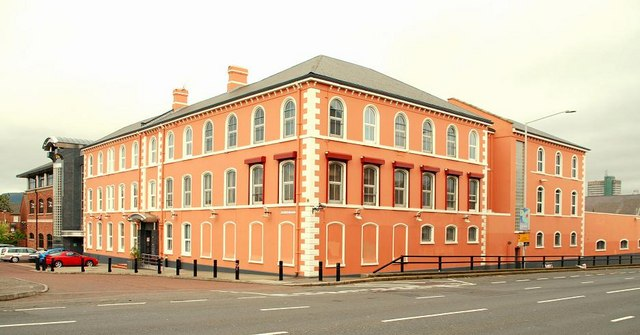
The former Wireless Group headquarters at Havelock House. The company relocated to City Quays 2 in 2018.

UTV Limited (originally Ulster Television plc), which began in 1959 as an ITV franchise holder in Northern Ireland, purchased ISP Direct Net Access in March 2000 for £4.4m, rebranding it as UTV Internet and later UTV Connect. The service expanded into telephone market under UTV Talk in August 2004 and also provided broadband and fibre optic packages for Northern Ireland, the Republic and the rest of the UK. The service was sold to Rainbow Communications and Vodafone Ireland in 2014.

The company also set up an online car dealership UTV Drive, created in partnership with Abbey Insurance, which was sold in 2014.

Further expansion took place with the move into radio, starting in Cork with 96FM and C103 in 2001. Further acquisitions were undertaken over the next decade, with the largest investment being the purchase of The Wireless Group in 2005 for £97m, boosting its radio portfolio with additional local stations, digital radio multiplexes and national station Talksport. In 2005, the group also launched its first station, U105, which broadcasts to the Belfast area, and purchased Juice FM in Liverpool.

With the expansion, turnover increased, with 2005 being up 46% on 2004, pre-tax profits rising by 12%, and employment up by 500 people to more than double the figure in the previous year. In 2006, total sales were £113.6m of which the radio division accounted for 54%, television 37% and 9% from new media. 48% of operating profits were earned in the radio side of the business, with 47% derived from television and 5% from new media.

=== Reorganisation of UTV and proposed mergers ===
Following shareholder approval, Ulster Television plc changed its name to UTV plc in June 2006. Then, on 16 August 2007, a re-organisation of the group was proposed, with the existing UTV plc, holding the ITV franchise only, becoming a wholly owned subsidiary of new holding company, UTV Media plc, and the remaining businesses transferred to the new holding company. The change was approved at an extraordinary general meeting on 19 September and came into effect on 15 October 2007, with shareholders receiving a 1:1 exchange of stock from the old to new company. The company, established on 1 June 2007 as Beechgrove Trading Limited, changed its name to UTV Media Limited on 13 August 2007, and to UTV Media plc on 21 August 2007.

In August and September 2006, the company made two merger proposals to STV Group plc, operator of the northern and central Scottish ITV franchises as STV. The latter proposal would have given SMG shareholders 52% of the merged company. On 20 September 2006, the plans were abandoned after SMG rejected the offer as unacceptable. However, on 10 January 2007, the two companies announced that they had agreed a merger, with SMG shareholders to receive 46% of the merged company and UTV 54%. After the details were expected to be finalised before the end of January, the deal was put on hold and then called off by SMG on 28 February 2007.

=== UTV Ireland and further radio expansion ===
In January 2015, the company launched UTV Ireland, carrying many of ITV's programming including Coronation Street and Emmerdale, which had been previously broadcast in Ireland by TV3. The station produces some home-grown programming, including the twice-nightly national news programme Ireland Live.

On 27 March 2015, it was confirmed that Sound Digital, which was 30% owned by the company, had been successful in its bid for the second national digital radio multiplex in the UK, which would be launched in 2016. As part of the bid, the company would expand its Talksport station with new sister stations Talksport 2 and Talkradio, as well as running a relaunched Virgin Radio UK. The multiplex was launched on 29 February 2016, with the new stations launching over the following month less talkBUSINESS, which was replaced by Share Radio on the multiplex.

=== Sale of UTV to ITV plc ===
The Wireless Group logo until 2023, It continued to be used for its Irish operations until 2025.

On 19 October 2015, it was announced that ITV plc would acquire UTV's ITV franchise and UTV Ireland for £100 million, subject to regulatory approval. UTV retained its radio operations, but was required to rename itself after including the UTV brand in the sale.

The sale to ITV plc was completed on 29 February 2016, when the company also rebranded as Wireless Group plc. On 30 June 2016 Rupert Murdoch's News Corp announced an agreement to purchase the company for all-cash worth between $220–296 million. The sale was completed on 26 September 2016.

=== Financial results ===
In May 2019, it was reported that Wireless Radio (ROI) Ltd last year recorded pre-tax losses of €2.23m and this followed pre-tax losses of €4.33m for the preceding 18 months.

In March 2025, Wireless Ireland and its sales house UrbanMedia rebranded to Onic with the company launching 10 new digital radio services on DAB+ across the Leinster area and online.

== Operations ==
The company splits its operations into three divisions, Radio GB, Onic and Digital.

=== Radio GB ===
Formed from the original Wireless Group purchase, the division has its origins from Talk Radio, the owner of the station of the same name, later renamed Talksport in 2000. A consortium including MVI, News International, Radio Investments and LMC Radio, headed by chief executive Kelvin MacKenzie, under the name TalkCo, purchased the group in 1998 for £15.5m and was subsequently renamed The Wireless Group in 1999. The company expanded when it purchased The Radio Partnership in 1999, gaining control of its nine local commercial stations and becoming the fifth largest radio company in the UK.

The Wireless Group was a founding member of Switchdigital, a network of DAB multiplexes which, as of 2025, includes the regional ensemble for Central Scotland and local ensembles in London and Aberdeen.

On 8 February 2019, it was announced that the local stations would be sold to Bauer Radio.

National

- talkSPORT
- talkSPORT 2
- talkRADIO
- Times Radio (jointly with The Times and The Sunday Times)
- Virgin Radio UK

DAB multiplexes

- Sound Digital (with Bauer Radio and Arqiva)

=== Onic ===
Onic, formerly known as Wireless Ireland, is responsible for operating its radio stations in Ireland with its headquarters in Dublin and regional offices in Cork, Limerick, Drogheda, Galway and Waterford.

Local stations

- Dublin's Q102 : Dublin
- FM104 : Dublin
- Cork's 96FM : Cork
- C103 : Cork
- Live95 : Limerick
- LMFM : Drogheda
- U105 : Belfast

=== Other divisions ===
The company published a free, London-based men's magazine called Sport until 2017.

Wireless Group owned the digital agency Zesty until Zesty was acquired by Granite Digital in 2025.
