= Absolute Radio Classic Rock =

Coordinates: 51.51225°N 0.13694°W

Absolute Classic Rock
- London; United Kingdom
- Broadcast area: United Kingdom
- Frequencies: DAB+: 11A Sound Digital (UK); DAB: 11B Arqiva Ayr; DAB: 11C CE Digital Birmingham; DAB: 11B Bradford and Huddersfield; DAB: 12D Arqiva Coventry; DAB: 12D Bauer Edinburgh; DAB: 11C Bauer Glasgow; DAB: 10D Bauer Humberside; DAB: 11B Bauer Inverness; DAB: 12A Bauer Lancashire; DAB: 12D Bauer Leeds; DAB: 10C Bauer Liverpool; DAB: 11B DRG London; DAB: 11B North Cumbria; DAB: 12D Bauer Northern Ireland; DAB: 11C Bauer Sheffield; DAB: 12A Swansea; DAB: 11B Bauer Teesside; DAB: 11C Bauer Tyne and Wear
- Branding: Absolute Classic Rock

Programming
- Format: Classic rock
- Network: Absolute Radio Network

Ownership
- Owner: Bauer Radio
- Sister stations: Absolute Radio; Absolute Radio 60s; Absolute Radio 70s; Absolute Radio 80s; Absolute Radio 90s; Absolute Radio 00s; Absolute Radio 10s; Absolute Radio 20s; Absolute Radio Country

History
- First air date: 4 December 2000
- Former frequencies: 990 MW; 1017 MW; 1152 MW

Links
- Webcast: Rayo
- Website: www.absoluteclassicrock.co.uk

Absolute Classic Rock is a national digital radio station owned and operated by Bauer as part of the Absolute Radio Network. Its music output is non-stop classic rock hits.

Formerly known as Virgin Radio Classic Rock, it originally was an internet-only radio station, and launched in 2000 under the name Virgin Classic by Lee Roberts, SMG Radio Director. On DAB Digital Radio in London, the station launched at 12:15pm with Richard Skinner introducing Steppenwolf's "Born to Be Wild". The launch time, presenter, and song (though not the artist) were identical to its parent station Virgin Radio.

On 1 September 2008 it was announced that Virgin Radio Classic Rock would be rebranded as Absolute Classic Rock on 29 September 2008.

The station was removed from Freesat channel 725 on 8 December 2011 because of "economic realities". On 13 December 2023, Absolute Radio Classic Rock was removed from Sky and Virgin Media, along with every other radio station owned by Bauer Media on either TV platform, including Absolute Radio, Absolute Radio 80s, Absolute Radio 90s, Hits Radio, Greatest Hits Radio, Kiss, Magic, Jazz FM and Planet Rock.

== DAB expansion ==
On 10 December 2010 Absolute Classic Rock expanded on DAB from London, taking over from Global Radio owned Gold on DAB in the North of England where there were 10 million potential new listeners on DAB in Newcastle, Sunderland, Darlington, Middlesbrough, Leeds, Hull, Scunthorpe, Grimsby, York, Huddersfield, Doncaster, Harrogate, Bradford, Sheffield, Blackburn, Preston, Blackpool, Bolton, Lancaster, Liverpool, Chester, Wrexham (North Wales) and Warrington.

On 20 December 2010 Absolute Classic Rock launched on DAB to a potential new 3 million new listeners in Ayr, Bath, Cardiff, Coventry and Exeter.

In 2011 it was confirmed by Ofcom that to accommodate the launch of new sister station Absolute Radio 60s, the reduction of the broadcast bitrate of Absolute Classic Rock would be permitted on the various multiplexes on which it broadcasts.

On 16 October 2023, Absolute Radio Classic Rock began broadcasting nationally on DAB+, broadcasting in stereo.

=== West Midlands changes ===
On 7 January 2019, Bauer closed Free Radio 80s and replaced it with Greatest Hits Radio West Midlands. It launched the station on its 105.2 FM frequency which covers Birmingham and the Black Country and Bauer chose to allocate its AM frequencies which cover that area to Absolute Classic Rock. This was the first time that the station had been available on analogue radio. Transmissions on 990 and 1017 kHz ceased on 30 April 2020, with the service remaining on 1152 kHz until 30 June 2020, when that also ceased.

== Former presenters ==
Former presenters include Richard Skinner, Tommy Vance, Gordon Loncaster and Alice Cooper.
