= Switchdigital =

British DAB multiplex operator

Switchdigital is an operator of DAB ensembles in the United Kingdom. It was founded in 1998 by the Wireless Group, Virgin Radio and Clear Channel International and is owned by News Broadcasting. As of October 2000, it was 55% owned by Wireless Group, 20% owned by Capital Radio and Clear Channel International each and 5% owned by Carphone Warehouse.

== Multiplexes ==
=== Aberdeen ===
Switchdigital was one of two applicants for the licence to broadcast in the Aberdeen area along with Scottish Radio Holdings-owned Score Digital, ultimately being granted the licence on 6 April 2001. The multiplex started broadcasting on 3 December of that year.

=== Central Scotland ===
On 6 October 2000, Switchdigital was granted the licence to broadcast in the Central Scotland area covering the Central Belt – including Edinburgh, Glasgow and Stirling – having been the only candidate for the regional multiplex. It started broadcasting on 5 July 2001 and is the last regional DAB multiplex in the UK following the cessation of MXR's Yorkshire ensemble in June 2015.

=== London ===
Switchdigital operates one of three London-wide multiplexes alongside CE Digital and DRG London. While its initial application for a licence to broadcast in the area was unsuccessful, it was ultimately successful in a subsequent bid on 7 April 2000. It started broadcasting on 26 June of that year.

== Other applications ==
The company applied for the licence to broadcast in Tayside on 18 May 2001, which was ultimately awarded to Score Digital on 6 September of that year.

== See also ==
- CE Digital
- DRG London
