= C3 =

C3, C-3, C03, C.III or similar may refer to:

== Science, technology, and transportation ==
=== Inorganic chemistry ===
- C_{3}, the chemical symbol for:
  - Tricarbon
  - Cyclopropatriene

=== Life and biology ===
==== Biochemistry ====
- C_{3} carbon fixation in plants
- C3-convertase, an enzyme
- Complement component 3, a protein of the innate immune system
- Apolipoprotein C3, a human very low density lipoprotein
- ATC code C03 Diuretics, a subgroup of the Anatomical Therapeutic Chemical Classification System
- Castavinol C3, a natural phenolic compound found in red wines
- Cytochrome-c3 hydrogenase, an enzyme

==== Other uses in life and biology ====
- Haplogroup C-M217, called C3 in older publications
- In human anatomy, C3 may refer to:
  - Cervical vertebra 3, one of the cervical vertebrae of the vertebral column
  - Cervical spinal nerve 3
- Clinical Cell Culture, a medical technology company
- C03, Malignant neoplasm of gum ICD-10 code
- C3 Collaborating for Health, a health-promotion NGO
- C3, an EEG electrode site according to the 10-20 system
- Chromosome 3

=== Computing and electronics ===
- C3.ai, an AI company founded by Thomas Siebel
- Chaos Communication Congress, the biggest annual hacker event in Europe
- Chrysler Comprehensive Compensation System, important in the development of Extreme Programming
- C3, a programming language based on the C language
- Hexadecimal number C3 (decimal 195)
- VIA C3, a computer processor
- Argus C3, a 35mm rangefinder camera
- Nokia C3 (disambiguation), various Nokia cellphones

=== Outer space ===
- Caldwell 3 (NGC 4236), a barred spiral galaxy in Draco
- C_{3}, characteristic energy, in astrodynamics, a measure of the rocket energy for an interplanetary mission that requires attaining an orbital velocity above escape velocity
- Delfi-C3, a Dutch CubeSat satellite
- Saturn C-3, a 1960 rocket in the Saturn C series
- Cluster 3, also known as Samba, an ESA satellite

=== Military technology ===
==== Warplanes ====
- Ford Trimotor, US miltary designation C-3
- Several German World War I and World War II armed reconnaissance aircraft:
  - AEG C.III
  - AGO C.III, a reconnaissance biplane of World War I
  - Albatros C.III
  - DFW C.III, a DFW aircraft
- NAG C.III, an engine powering the Gotha G.IV aircraft
- C-3, a U.S. military transport version of the Martin 4-0-4

==== Submarines ====
- HMS C3, a 1906 British C-class submarine
- Spanish submarine C-3, a 1928 Spanish Navy C-class submarine
- Type C3 submarine (disambiguation), two classes of Imperial Japanese Navy submarines
- USS C-3, a 1909 US Navy C-class submarine

==== Other military technology ====
- Command, control, and communications
- C-3 (plastic explosive), related to C4
- C3 Howitzer, a lengthened variant of the M101, used by the Canadian Armed Forces
- Type C3-class ship, a type of merchant cargo ships of US Maritime Commission "C" design
- USS Baltimore (C-3), an 1888 protected cruiser of the US Navy

=== Civilian vehicles ===
==== Cars ====
- Chevrolet Corvette (C3), the third production design of the Chevrolet Corvette, produced 1967–1982
- Citroën C3, French supermini, produced since 2002
- Cowin C3, subcompact sedan, manufactured by Chinese automaker Kaiyi Auto, 2014–2020
- Nimrod NRA/C3, a 1983 Group C racing car never achieved

==== Trains ====
- Bavarian C III, a German steam locomotive model, built 1868–1879
- Bavarian C III (Ostbahn), an 1867 German steam locomotive model
- LB&SCR C3 class, a British LB&SCR locomotive, built 1906
- C3 (railcar), a bi-level railcar built 1997–1999 by Kawasaki Railcar for the non-electrified branches of the Long Island Rail Road

==== Other civilian vehicles ====
- Aeronca C-3, an American airplane
- Cierva C.3, a 1921 Spanish experimental autogyro
- Yamaha C3, a 2007 liquid cooled 49cc four-stroke motor scooter

== Arts and media ==
=== Broadcasting ===
- C-3 (TV channel) or Community 3, a children's channel launched 1977 on the QUBE cable system that later became Nickelodeon
- C3, a class in FM radio broadcasting in North America
- C3 (Live + 3), Nielsen ratings that include recorded programs watched three days later

=== Music ===
- Hammond C3 organ
- High C in music (c3 in European notation)
- Low C in music (C3 in American notation)
- Tha Carter III, 2008 album by rapper Lil Wayne
- C3 (Base Ball Bear album), 2020, Japanese rock
- C3 Presents, an American producer and promoter of international music events, founded 2007

=== Video games ===
- C3 Racing: Car Constructors Championship or Max Power Racing, 1998, developed by Eutechnyx and published by Infogrames Multimedia for the PlayStation
- Creatures 3, 1999, artificial life game developed by Creature Labs and published by Mindscape and Linux Game Publishing for desktop operating systems
- Crysis 3, 2013, first-person shooter developed by Crytek and published by Electronic Arts for various platforms

=== Other uses in arts and media ===
- C^{3} (novel series), C Cube (Japanese: シーキューブ), or Cube×Cursed×Curious, a 2011 Japanese light novel series and anime by Hazuki Minase
- C3 Entertainment, formerly Comedy III Productions, an American entertainment and licensing company, founded 1959
- C3 (production company), founded by Richard H. Frank c. 1995, in affiliation with Comcast

== Sport ==
- C3 (classification), a para-cycling classification
- C3, the UEFA Europa League in football
- Tippmann C-3, a pump-action paintball marker that uses propane gas

== Other businesses and organizations ==
- C3, a New Zealand logistics company owned by Linx Cargo Care Group
- C-III Capital Partners, an asset management and commercial real estate services company
- Garda Crime and Security Branch (CSB), domestic security agency of Ireland's national police, previously known as "C3"
- C3 Church Global, a worldwide Pentecostal denomination
- Championing Community Children, a Philippine charitable organization abbreviated as C3

== Law ==
- C3, the code for permission to use specific land or premises for dwellings in town and country planning in the United Kingdom
- C3 policing ("Counter Criminal Continuum") or the Avghani model, a methodology being employed by police to combat gangs in Massachusetts, created by Michael M. Cutone c. 2009
- C-3 visa, a type of American non-immigrant visa for governmental officials and associated people

== People ==
- Charles Keating III (born 1955), American former swimmer and real estate executive
- Charles III (born 1948), King of the United Kingdom and 14 other Commonwealth realms since 2022

== Transport routes ==
- Circumferential Road 3 or C-3, an arterial road of Manila, Philippines
- London Buses route C3, a Transport for London contracted bus route
- Two different ring expressways in Japan that are numbered C3:
  - Tokyo Gaikan Expressway in Tokyo, Saitama and Chiba Prefectures
  - Tōkai-Kanjō Expressway in Aichi, Gifu and Mie Prefectures

== Other uses ==
- C3, a standard paper size defined in ISO 216

== See also ==
- C2 (disambiguation)
- C4 (disambiguation)
- CCC (disambiguation)
- 3C (disambiguation)
- C30 (disambiguation)
- C3:0, the lipid numbering of propionic acid
- Stella Women's Academy, High School Division Class C^{3}, abbreviated C^{3}-Bu, a 2010s manga series written by Ikoma and illustrated by Tomomoka Midori, centered around Yura Yamato and the C^{3} Club
- Collaborative Climate Community Data and Processing Grid (C3-Grid), a project that participated in the D-Grid Initiative
- C_{3}-Benzenes
- c^{3} Aquarii, the Bayer designation of binary star system 89 Aqr
- C^{3} Centauri, a suspected astrometric binary star system
- C3 Sicilian, the Alapin Variation of the Sicilian Defence, an opening in chess
- C3-R, a name for the medical procedure of corneal cross-linking
- C-3PO or See-Threepio, a humanoid robot Star Wars character
- Alternative-complement-pathway C3/C5 convertase
- ru:СЗ
