= Beverly Malone =

American nurse

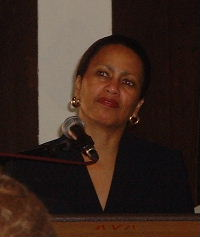
- Beverly Malone in 2003

Chief executive officer of the National League for Nursing
- In office February 2007 – incumbent

General Secretary of the Royal College of Nursing
- In office June 2001 – December 2006
- Preceded by: Christine Hancock
- Succeeded by: Peter Carter

Deputy assistant secretary for health
- In office 1999–2001

President of the American Nurses Association
- In office 1996–2000

Personal details
- Born: 1948 (age 77–78)
- Children: 2
- Education: University of Cincinnati (BSN, PhD); Rutgers University in Newark (MSN)

Beverly Louise Malone (born 1948) is the chief executive officer of the National League for Nursing in the United States. Prior to assuming this position in February 2007 she served as general secretary of the Royal College of Nursing in the United Kingdom for six years.

== Early life ==
Malone is the eldest of seven siblings. Her mother worked as a tax auditor for the Internal Revenue Service and her father was a train engineer. She was raised in Elizabethtown, in rural Kentucky, in the segregated deep south of the United States by her great-grandmother.

== University education and nursing/academic career (1970–1996) ==
Malone obtained a bachelor's degree in nursing from the University of Cincinnati in 1970. From 1970 she worked as a nurse in Newark and Irvington (both New Jersey), obtaining a master's degree in adult psychiatric nursing from Rutgers University in Newark in 1972. In 1972 she was appointed Instructor of Psychiatric Nursing at Wayne State University in Michigan. From 1973 she was a specialist nurse, professor and administrator at University Hospital, Cincinnati. She obtained her PhD in clinical psychology from University of Cincinnati in 1981 and was then Assistant Administrator of the Medical Centre. In 1986 Malone was made dean of the School of Nursing at North Carolina Agricultural and Technical State University, a historically black university. She became Vice Chancellor in 1994. In North Carolina, she also served on a number of public bodies (including the Governor's Task Force on Nursing Shortage, the North Carolina Commission on Health Services, and the Board of Directors of the Adolescent Pregnancy Prevention Program).

== President of the American Nurses Association (1996–2000) ==
In 1996 Malone was elected President of the American Nurses Association (ANA), an organization representing 180,000 nurses throughout the United States and based in Washington. She was the second African-American to hold this position. She served two terms lasting to 2000. President Bill Clinton appointed her as a member of the US delegation to the World Health Assembly, the governing body of the World Health Organization in 1998 and 1999. She was later to be appointed to a similar position by Prime Minister Tony Blair, in 2006.

During her presidency, Malone served on President Bill Clinton's Advisory Commission on Consumer Protection and Quality in the Health Care Industry and in March 1998 she was appointed to the Health Care Quality Measurement and Reporting Committee. She also represented U.S. nurses in the Congress of Nurse Representatives of the International Council of Nurses. and served on the board of directors of the National Patient Safety Partnership, a collaboration with the Department of Veterans Affairs, the American Medical Association and other national health care organizations.14484

== Deputy assistant secretary for health (1999–2001) ==
From 2000 she was appointed by Bill Clinton to the post of deputy assistant secretary for health within the United States Department of Health and Human Services, the highest position that a nurse had ever held in the US government.

== General Secretary of the Royal College of Nursing (2001–2006) ==
"How could the RCN want an American, an African American to run the most prestigious professional nursing trade union in the world?"

— Beverly Malone, writing of her feelings when she was offered the post

In 2001 Malone moved to the United Kingdom when she was appointed to the post of General Secretary of the Royal College of Nursing (RCN), the largest professional union of nursing staff in the world, succeeding Christine Hancock. This was somewhat surprising; as she later wrote "How could the RCN want an American, an African American to run the most prestigious professional nursing trade union in the world? [Malone, 2007] Clinton is said to have smoothed the way politically by "having a word" with Tony Blair and Gordon Brown She was to remain in this post until January 2007.

She was also a member of the Higher Education Funding Council for England (HEFCE) and represented the RCN at the European Federation of Nurses Associations (EFN), the Commonwealth Nurses Federation, and the International Council of Nurses (together with the RCN president).

She was at first the subject of considerable media attention and some controversy, partly because of the novelty of an American holding such a political post in Britain, but also because of her generous remuneration package. There was also criticism of her mother, Dorothy Black, receiving free eye surgery under the National Health Service soon after her arrival in spite of having paid no British taxes or insurance contributions. Officials stated that her mother not been given preferential treatment and, as a resident or dependent relative of a resident, was entitled to the same free healthcare as anyone else. She was also criticized for attending a Labour Party event as a guest, because of the traditional party-political neutrality of her employer.

In 2003 she became a member of the steering committee of the NHS Modernisation Agency. In 2006, Tony Blair appointed her as a member of the UK delegation to the World Health Assembly. She had previously represented the United States in a similar role in 1998 and 1999.

In an interview with the Guardian newspaper before returning to the United States, while criticizing job cuts and cost cutting in the British National Health Service, she spoke favorably of the system, calling it "a treasure" and praising a system where healthcare is a right rather than a privilege. Though treated somewhat roughly by the British media, she welcomed the greater "visibility" of the nursing profession in Britain, compared with the United States.

== Chief Executive Officer of the National League for Nursing (2007–present) ==
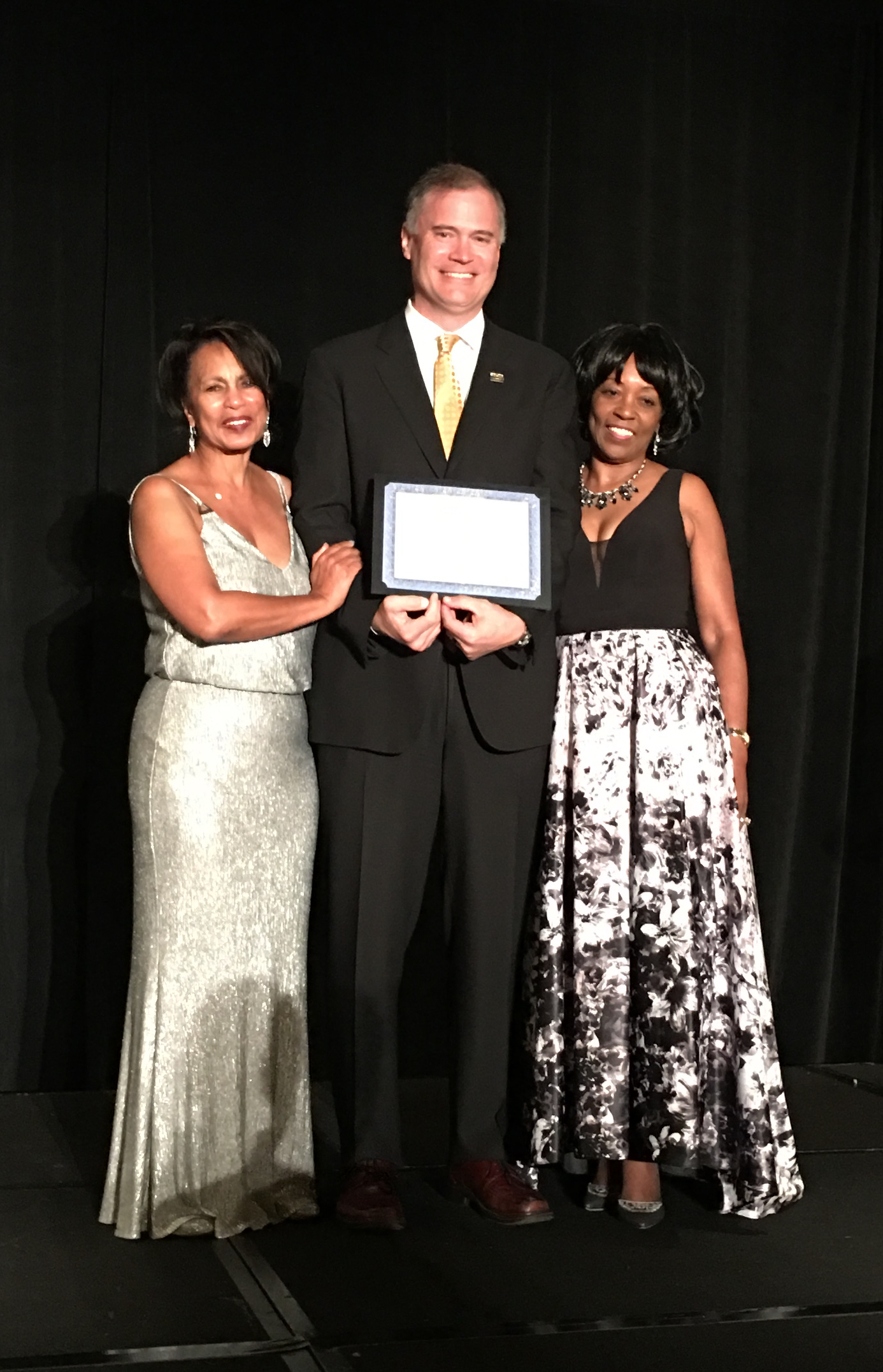
Beverly Malone (left) in her role as NLN CEO and G. Rumay Alexander (right) in her role as NLN President formally recognizing Daniel Oerther (center) for his contributions to nursing education at an awards ceremony in 2018

From February 2007 Malone was appointed chief executive officer of the National League for Nursing (NLN), which has a membership of over 40,000, and she has held this post to the present.

She also represented U.S. nurses in the Congress of Nurse Representatives of the International Council of Nurses.

In 2009, she testified during the Congressional budget hearings. She also served on the Institute of Medicine's Forum on the Future of Nursing Education.

== Interests and priorities ==
Malone has been particularly involved in minority health issues, racial and ethnic health disparities, and other issues of race and cultural diversity.

== Personal life ==
Malone is divorced and has two children, Tosha and Jelani, and four grandchildren. She is a member of the Baptist church and is religious.

== Recognition and awards ==
Malone has received numerous honors and awards, including the:

- Chi Eta Phi sorority's Mabel Keaton Staupers Award
- Honorary Doctor of science degree from Indiana University in Indianapolis
- Honorary D\\he University (DUniv) from the University of Stirling (2005)
- Anthony J Janetti award for extraordinary contributions to healthcare
- Distinguished Alumnus Award for outstanding contribution to nursing and society
- Excellence in Nursing Education Award from North Carolina League for Nursing
- Golden Key National Honor Society's Honorary Member Award
- Fellow of the American Academy of Nursing
- Ebony Magazine named Dr. Malone one of the "100-Plus Influential Black Americans and Organization Leaders" in the United States.
- In 2010 she was ranked 29th most powerful person in healthcare.
- In 2013, she received the Loretta Ford CARE Lifetime Achievement Award.
- In 2016, Dr. Malone was ranked #39 on the Modern Healthcare list of 100 Most Influential People in Healthcare.
- In 2020, Dr. Malone was presented with the American Academy of Nursing Living Legend Award.

== Publications ==
Malone is a member of the editorial boards of

- the Journal of Black Psychology
- the Journal of Professional Nursing.

=== Works ===
- Malone, Beverly (2005). Succeeding As a Nurse: The Experts Share Their Secrets. Health Press Limited. ISBN 9781903734698.
- Dreachslin, J.L.; Gilbert, J.; Malone, Beverly (2012). Diversity and Cultural Competence in Health Care: A Systems Approach. Wiley. ISBN 9781118282168.
