= Country radio =

Radio station that plays country music

Country radio refers to radio stations that play country music. Most country radio stations are commercial radio stations. Most country radio stations usually play only music which has been officially released to country radio by record labels. The largest owners of country music stations in the United States include iHeartMedia, Cumulus Media, Audacy, and Townsquare Media. There are more radio stations in the United States specializing in country music (about 2,100 stations) than any other format, out of a total of about 15,000 radio stations in the US. Country radio stations are very influential in the country music industry, compared to other genres of music. Until 2012, only country radio stations were counted in the Billboard Hot Country Songs chart's airplay component, and from 1990 to 2012, country radio was the sole arbiter of a song's position on that chart; the same magazine's Country Airplay chart remains limited solely to country radio stations.

== Country Formats ==
Country radio stations come in a wide variety of formats.

The most common is Mainstream Country, which follows the basic format of contemporary hit radio in that the current top 40 hits on the country record charts serve as the core playlist, with select recurrents from the past 15 years rounding out the format.

Hot Country stations focus almost exclusively on top 40 country hits, with occasional acoustic pop hits from outside the country genre.

Adult Country formats follow a pattern similar to the adult contemporary music format: a few hits, while mostly focused on songs in recurrent rotation from the past 30 years and maintaining a sound similar to that of mainstream country outlets.

Classic Country stations, increasingly rare in their original form, play only older music; much like other "classic" formats such as oldies/classic hits and classic rock, the eras from which classic country has drawn its music has slowly drifted in real time.

Traditional Country uses classic country as its base while maintaining some current or recurrent hits that fit the classic country sound.

Americana is a loosely defined country radio format that is less focused on hits and thus more willing to play bluegrass, alt-country and regional acts whose commercial performance would not warrant being played on a mainstream country station; Americana stations do not always self-identify as country.

In terms of driving the mainstream popularity of hit country songs within the music industry, "country radio" typically encompasses only mainstream country and hot country stations.

== United Kingdom ==
There have been a number of attempts to provide country radio in the UK marketplace, though not all have been successful. In contrast to other English-speaking nations such as Canada, Australia and the United States, country has typically been less popular as a genre in the UK (particularly in England; the Celtic realms of Northern Ireland and Scotland have been somewhat more receptive, as the country genre has extensive roots in Celtic folk music) and attempts at all-country radio there have been more sporadic.

Country 1035 went on air in September 1994 as London's first full-time country music station. The AM station was never hugely successful financially, and passed through several owners, becoming RTL Country, Ritz Country and then Mean Country, eventually ending up with Avtar Lit, who relaunched the station as easy listening/country hybrid Easy Radio London in 2002. The following year, the AM frequency became Asian talk station Kismat Radio, with the Easy service continuing on DAB only until ceasing altogether in 2008.

Radio Clyde launched digital country music service 3C on DAB in various areas (though never London) in the early 00s, with national carriage on the Freeview digital TV service subsequently added. Following the acquisition of Clyde parent SRH by the Emap group (now Bauer Radio) in 2005, 3C was shut down in March 2007, Clyde 1 taking its place on Freeview to see out the final year of the contract.

Chris Country, playing US and UK country music, launched online in 2013, and since 2016 has been gathering carriage on DAB, mostly on small-scale multiplexes though also on some full local muxes including in London. In some areas Chris Country uses, or has switched to, the DAB+ broadcast standard. Chris Country was sold to the owners of the CountryLine app in 2020, with the radio station rebranded to CountryLine Radio on 7th March 2022.

In spring 2015, Bauer returned to country for the first time since the closure of 3C when their Northern Ireland station Downtown Radio, off the back of their successful weekly country strand, launched a digital service, Downtown Country, via DAB across NI (and UK-wide online). In February 2020, Downtown removed country music shows from its FM and principal DAB frequencies, moving these shows to broadcast solely on AM and Downtown Country.

In March 2019, Global launched an online country music stream under the Smooth Radio brand, with the commencement of Smooth Country on the Smooth website and Global Player app. The service was not carried on terrestrial radio platforms until being relaunched as a DAB radio service in a number of locations on 3 September 2019.

On 5 April 2019, Bauer Radio launched Country Hits Radio, a new digital country music station, on DAB radio in several areas (largely replacing KissFresh) and nationally online. The Saturdays' Una Healy is among the presenters, with Baylen Leonard - who joined from Chris Country - launching the new station at 10am on 5 April. It appears that the station will coexist with the existing Northern Ireland-focused Downtown Country operation, with Greatest Hits Radio replacing KissFresh on DAB in NI. Country Hits Radio transitioned to sit within Bauer's Absolute Radio Network as Absolute Radio Country in May 2021.

On the 1st May 2021 Nashville Worldwide radio launched. Initially just available through the website, the station is now available on Alexa, multiple radio streaming apps and it has its own Android app. The station owner Chad J Country has a vision of taking radio back to how it used to be, where DJ's played the music they love and connect with the audience. The station plays a wide range of independent artists as well as the bigger well known acts. Nashville Worldwide broadcasts to the UK, United States and Canada.
