= Dorothy Cornelius =

American registered nurse

Dorothy Alice Cornelius (March 9, 1918–1992) was an American registered nurse from Ohio who served in executive and in leadership positions in nursing. Cornelius was the only person to be president of the American Nurses Association, the International Council of Nurses, and the American Journal of Nursing Company.

== Early life and education ==
Dorothy Alice Cornelius was born on March 9, 1918, in Johnstown, Pennsylvania. Cornelius earned a diploma in nursing from the Conemaugh Valley Memorial Hospital School of Nursing in Johnstown, PA in 1939. She obtained a Bachelor of Science in nursing from the University of Pittsburgh School of Nursing in 1942.

== Career ==
=== Early career ===
After graduation, Cornelius worked as a public health nurse in Pittsburgh, Pennsylvania, as director of the Tuberculosis Hospital of Pittsburgh. She worked for the American Red Cross in Johnstown and Cleveland, Ohio, as chief nurse of the blood donation program. During World War Two, Cornelius served in the United States Navy Corp of Nurse, Lieutenant Junior Grade.

=== Ohio Nurses Association ===
Cornelius held leadership positions in Ohio where she served as the executive director of the Ohio Nurses Association and the editor of the Ohio Nurses Review from 1957 to 1983. She was appointed to the Governor's Commission on Aging in Ohio in 1961 and chaired the Ohio Women's Defense Council in 1963, and the Girls Industrial School.

=== American Nurses Association ===
In 1960, Cornelius was appointed to the American Nurses Association's Committee on Economic and General Welfare. She was elected the first vice-president of the American Nurses Association in 1964. During this period, Cornelius was also the chairwomen of the American Nurses Association's Finance, Retirement, and Employee Relations Committees. Cornelius took on the position of president of the American Nurses Association in 1968.

Cornelius worked to professionalize nursing and for mandatory licensure of nurses.

=== International Council of Nurses ===
In 1973, Cornelius was elected president of the International Council of Nurses.

=== United States Federal Committees ===
Cornelius was appointed to national committees by United States Presidents Dwight D. Eisenhower, John F. Kennedy, Lyndon B. Johnson, and Richard Nixon.

== Political office ==
In 1963 Cornelius was the first women to run for city council in her hometown, Reynoldsburg, Ohio. She held other local positions including ward chairwomen and membership on the Reynoldsburg Planning and Zoning Commission.

== Recognition ==
Cornelius was named one of Ohio's Top Ten Women in 1963. She received commendations from the governors of Ohio and Pennsylvania, and the Ohio Senate and House of Representatives. Other awards include the American Red Cross National Award for distinguished service, Fellow of the American Academy of Nursing in 1977. Cornelius was inducted in to the Ohio Women's Hall of Fame in 1981, the American Nursing Association Hall of Fame in 1996 and the Ohio Veterans Hall of Fame in 1997. Cornelius was honored as an Ohio State University Local Legend in 2008.

The Ohio Nurses Association headquarters building was named after Cornelius in 1977.

== Death and legacy ==
Cornelius retired in 1983 because of declining health. She died in 1992.

The Mid-Ohio District Nurses Association established the Dorothy Alice Cornelius Nursing Scholarship Fund to "honor the professionalism and ideals" of Cornelius.
