= 3C =

3C may refer to:

In astronomy:

- 3C, the Third Cambridge Catalogue of Radio Sources, an astronomical reference series

In business:

- 3C Records
- 3C (radio station), a defunct digital radio station
- 3C (trade association), an American trade association.
- Three-cent piece
- Long March 3C, a 2008 Chinese orbital rocket
- Team 3C Casalinghi Jet Androni Giocattoli, a defunct Italian professional cycling team
- 3C, the former IATA code for defunct American airline RegionsAir
- The IATA code for Air Chathams

In computing:

- Three Cs (Compulsory, Capacity, and Conflict), three categories of CPU cache misses
- An abbreviation used in Taiwan to refer to "computer, communication, and consumer electronics" as a collective product category
- Computer Control Company, Inc., a pioneering minicomputer company (1953–1966)
- Agile model: 3C (Card, Conversation, Confirmation)

In genetics:

- Alpha-tubulin 3C, a human gene
- 3C, or Chromosome conformation capture, a technique used in molecular biology

Substituted amphetamines (3C (psychedelics) analogues):

- 3C-G (Ganesha) with homologues
- 3C-BZ
- 3C-P
- 3C-E

In places:

- Stalag III-C, a German Army World War II POW camp for Allied soldiers near Alt-Drewitz

In internet memes:

- Three Chefs

== See also ==
- C3 (disambiguation)
- List of pages with prefix 3C
