= American Edge Project =

U.S. tech advocacy organization, connected to Facebook

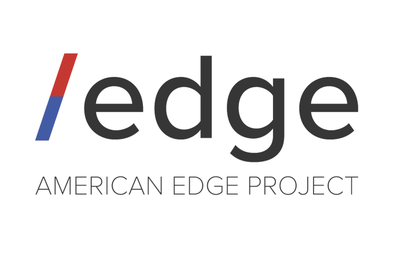
- Established: 2019
- Head: Doug Kelly
- Location: Vienna, Virginia
- Website: americanedgeproject.org

The American Edge Project is a policy advocacy group that promotes the interests of the technology industry, with a special emphasis on anti-trust issues. Its primary activities include advertising campaigns and writing op-eds. It has been criticized for its relationship with Meta, not disclosing its donors, and allegedly misleading advocacy.

== History and mission ==
The group was formed in December 2019 by Facebook and other technology organizations to promote the interests of the technology interest through advertising and public advocacy; according to The Washington Post its purpose is "to convince policymakers that Silicon Valley is essential to the U.S. economy and the future of free speech". It funds advertising campaigns and policy research.

In its own words, the American Edge Project was founded to “tell the story about the positive impact technology and innovation have on America's economy and businesses, particularly small ones, and how they enhance freedom of expression and our nation's overall security."

The organization was formed during a period of increased scrutiny of large technology companies by American lawmakers amid concerns over antitrust, privacy, security, and content moderation issues. According to the Washington Post the intent was to "create the appearance of opposition by grass-roots groups to antitrust regulation". The Benton Institute for Broadband & Society said the purpose of American Edge is "to burnish the image of US tech companies as they face intensifying regulatory scrutiny".

== Advocacy ==
=== Artificial intelligence ===
AEP ran an ad during the Trump-Biden presidential debate in 2024. The ad featured Sarah Haggard, the founder of Tribute. It encourages policymakers to take action to ensure American leadership in AI while noting the threat from foreign competitors.

=== Antitrust law ===
The group launched advertising campaigns addressing antitrust in the technology industry in 2020, continuing into 2021. It spent $5 million on advertising in 2020 and $10 million in 2021. According to CNBC, the House and Senate were at the time of the ad campaigns considering antitrust, data privacy, and other reform measures which would affect online technology platforms, almost none of which ultimately made it to a vote in either legislative body. According to the Wall Street Journal, spending by groups supporting the legislation over the same period was under $200,000. Governing magazine called the ads "among the most cynical" of those created at the time by various tech-industry lobbying groups.

The Brookings Institution characterized the ads as "misleading" and "emotional but fact-free", describing one ad featuring a small business owner saying, “I don't understand why some in Congress want to take away the technology we use every day."

In 2021, the Committee on the Judiciary in the House of Representatives approved numerous changes to antitrust laws relevant to technology firms. The proposed rules would have required large technology firms to create capabilities for users to transfer their data to alternative platforms and services, shifted the burden of proof in certain antitrust cases away from the government and onto tech firms, stopped large platforms from running other businesses with conflicts of interest, and prohibited them from using their market power to create advantages for themselves. Similar legislation was introduced in the Senate called the American Innovation and Choice Online Act. This legislation focused mainly on self-preferencing by market-dominant technology companies. This bill was approved by the Senate Committee on the Judiciary in January 2022. None of this legislation became law.

The group also paid for the placement of op-ed columns in local newspapers throughout the country signed by representatives of local business groups; according to the Washington Post the objective was to create the impression of a grass-roots reaction to the proposed legislation.

== Leadership ==
Doug Kelly is the first CEO of the American Edge Project. Kelly is a native of rural Michigan and worked as technology director for the Democratic National Committee. In 2007, he became executive director of the Ohio Democratic Party. In 2011, he become CEO of a major chapter of the Make-A-Wish Foundation.

=== Advisory board ===
Multiple former politicians and government employees have joined the organization as advisors or board members.

- Chris Carney
- Saxby Chambliss
- Kent Conrad
- Joseph Dunford
- Heidi Heitkamp
- Susana Martinez
- Michael Morell
- Loretta Sanchez
- Bradley Smith
- Frances Townsend
- Greg Walden

== Members ==
The group is part of a "supportive coalition" that includes Bear Hill Advisors, the Center for Individual Freedom, NetChoice, Connected Commerce Council, the National Black Chamber of Commerce and the National Small Business Association.

== Corporate form ==
The organization was incorporated as a non-profit in Virginia and in April 2020 registered a connected foundation. The Washington Post said the organizational structure "allows it to navigate a thicket of tax laws in such a way that it can raise money, and blitz the airwaves with ads, without the obligation of disclosing all of its donors".

== Funding ==
Facebook was a major donor early on, donating $4 million between late 2019 and early 2020 and another $34 million between late 2020 and early 2021. According to the Tech Transparency Project, Facebook was possibly the group's "sole funder".

In June 2020, ten advocacy groups, including Center for Humane Technology, End Citizens United, Let America Vote, MapLight, Public Citizen, and the National Association of Social Workers called on Mark Zuckerberg, CEO of Facebook, to shut the organization down. The organization has been characterized as a front group and a dark money group.

== See also ==
- Chamber of Progress
- Computer and Communications Industry Association
