= Effie J. Taylor =

Canadian nurse (1874–1970)

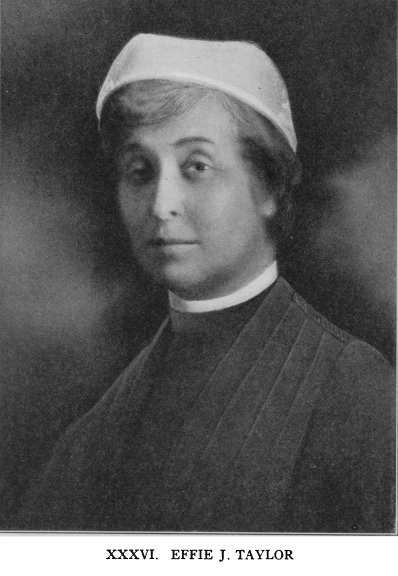

President of the International Council of Nurses
- In office 1937–1947
- Preceded by: Alicia Still
- Succeeded by: Gerda Hojer

Personal details
- Born: April 18, 1874 Hamilton, Ontario, Canada
- Died: May 20, 1970 (aged 96) Hamilton, Ontario, Canada

Euphemia Jane "Effie" Taylor (April 18, 1874 — May 20, 1970) was a Canadian nurse who became the president of the International Council of Nurses from 1937 to 1947.

== Early life and education ==
Taylor was born on April 18, 1874, in Hamilton, Ontario. In Hamilton, Taylor went to the Hamilton Collegiate Institute and Wesleyan Ladies College. She continued her education in the United States with a diploma in nursing at Johns Hopkins Hospital and a Bachelor of Science from Columbia University. Taylor was also honored by Yale University with a Master of Arts and Keuka College with a Doctor of humane letters.

== Career ==
Upon graduating from Johns Hopkins, Taylor remained at the hospital and began teaching in 1909. While at Johns Hopkins, she went to become an assistant matron in 1912 and a nursing director at The Henry Phipps Psychiatric Clinic until 1920.

Taylor left Johns Hopkins in 1922 to work at Yale University. When she arrived at Yale, Taylor was selected to become a superintendent at the Yale–New Haven Hospital while teaching. As a professor, she introduced a nursing course on mental illness and the inclusion of patient focused treatment into nursing programs at Yale. From 1934 to 1944, Taylor was the dean at the Yale School of Nursing.

Outside of university teaching, Taylor was named the president of the International Council of Nurses in 1937 and remained for a ten-year term.

== Death ==
Taylor died on May 20, 1970, in Hamilton, Ontario.

== Awards and honours ==
In 1959, Taylor was awarded the Florence Nightingale Medal. In 1986, Taylor was posthumously inducted into the American Nurses Association Hall of Fame.
