= IWP =

IWP may refer to:

== Education ==
- The Institute of World Politics, Washington DC, US
- International Writing Program, Iowa, US

== Government and politics ==
- International Workers Party, an American psychoanalytic-Marxist group (founded 1974)
- Internationalist Workers Party (Fourth International), an American Trotskyist group (founded 1980)
- Interview Waiver Program, for United States visa applicants
