= Emily (TV series) =

- Genre: Children's television series
- Created by: Domitille de Pressensé
- Directed by: Raymond Burlet
- Theme music composer: Philippe Noël
- Country of origin: France
- No. of seasons: 3
- No. of episodes: 49

Production
- Executive producer: Jacques Vercruyssen
- Running time: 5 minutes
- Production company: Kid Cartoons

Original release
- Network: Antenne 2
- Release: 1979 – 1979

Emily (Émilie in the original) is a cartoon series broadcast on Antenne 2's Récré A2 block in 1979. The cartoon follows the adventures of Emily, a little girl who wears only red. It is based on the Émilie book series, written and illustrated by Domitille de Pressensé.

== Characters ==
Emily has a pet hedgehog named Humphrey (Arthur in the French version). Other characters include Emily's cousins Alexander and Nicholas, her English friend Gregory, her friend Chloe, her little sister Pat (Elise in France), her big brother Stephen and his friends William and Sydney.

== Plot ==
The episodes show Emily facing her fears (fear of the dark, bed-wetting, and the hospital), managing relationships (jealousy of her sister), as well as playing and having fun (playing hide-and-seek, going to the circus).

== Release ==
Emily was broadcast in the United States as part of Nickelodeon's preschool series Pinwheel beginning in 1981. A new CGI Émilie series was released in 2012, consisting of 52 episodes.

== Links and references ==
- IMDB entry on Émilie
