= Nina Gage =

American nursing administrator (1883-1946)

Nina Gage, c. 1925

Nina Diadamia Gage (June 9, 1883 – October 18, 1946) was an American nurse who was a leading teacher of modern nursing in China, and ran a nursing school in Hunan province. She was president of the International Council of Nurses from 1925 to 1929. After returning from China to the US in 1927 she held various senior nursing posts in nursing education.

== Early life and education ==
Nina Diadamia Gage was born in Brooklyn on June 9, 1883 and grew up in New York. In 1905, she graduated from Wellesley College where she was a member of the missionary committee. She then went to the Roosevelt Hospital School of Nursing in New York, became a fully qualified registered nurse in 1908, and gained some experience as a night supervisor there. Her older brother Brownell (later Rev. Brownell Gage) and his wife Helen Howe Gage (who later qualified as a doctor) had been at the Yale-in-China mission in Changsha, Hunan since about 1904. She went there in 1909 and began work as a dispensary nurse.

== Career ==
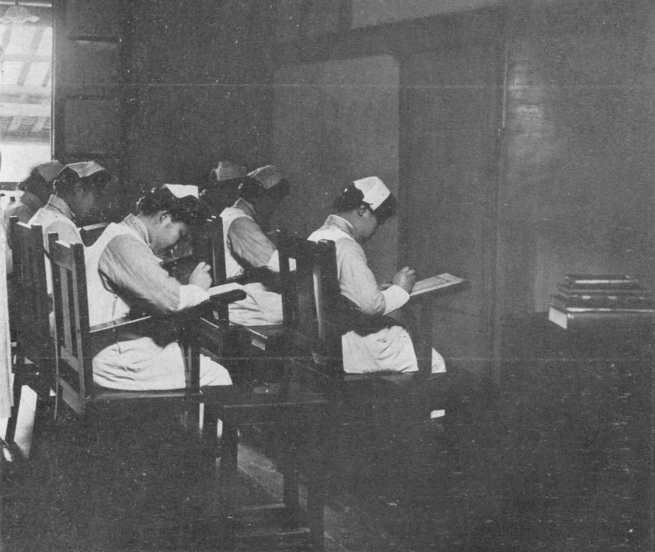
Students at Hsiang-Ya School of Nursing c. 1917, taking examination in bacteriology.

In 1912, she became the first president of the Nurses Association of China, and after a two-year term went on to be chairman of its education committee. She played a leading role in establishing a school of nursing at the missionary-founded Hsiang-Ya (Xiangya) Hospital. By 1919, she was Dean of the school. She wrote several articles about her experiences for readers of the American Journal of Nursing, sometimes illustrating them with photographs.

Her time in China was interrupted by World War I. Gage returned to the USA to join the faculty of the "Vassar Training Camp" which offered an intensive short course in 1918 for women students wishing to help with wartime nursing. Her work in Changsha then continued until about 1927 when political upheaval made it impossible for her to stay. There were other breaks from her service in China. In 1922, she was described as an "alumna" of Teachers College, and she received an MA from the associated university, Columbia University, in 1925.

She was elected president of the International Council of Nurses (ICN), representing China, for a four-year period while attending its 1925 conference in Helsingfors (Helsinki) where she presented a paper on adapting the nursing curriculum to local needs. This was praised in the American Journal of Nursing as showing Gage's "breadth and generosity of mind". She was introduced to the nurses as "the first dean" of a school of nursing anywhere in the world and the announcement of her presidency was enthusiastically applauded: a high point in her career.

In 1927, she went to Geneva, as ICN president, for a mid-term conference. At the end of her presidency she was responsible for the 1929 ICN Congress in Montreal where nurses from China were involved in planning and organising the event. Back in the US she became educational director and director of the nursing department of the Willard Parker Hospital in 1927, and was executive secretary of the National League for Nursing Education from 1928 to 1931. In 1931, she was appointed director of the new Nurses Training School at the Hampton Institute, a historically black institution.

She moved to Newport Hospital, Rhode Island in 1935 and stayed eight years as director of its school of nursing. While there she published a textbook on Communicable diseases (1939) to add to A general history of nursing (1933), her many articles in nursing journals and various nursing texts she had translated into Chinese. In 1943, she moved to be director at Protestant Hospital, in Nashville, Tennessee and retired in 1945. She died on October 18, 1946. In 1949 Gage Hall at the Newport Hospital was named in her honour.
