= Annette Kennedy =

Past President of the International Council of Nurses

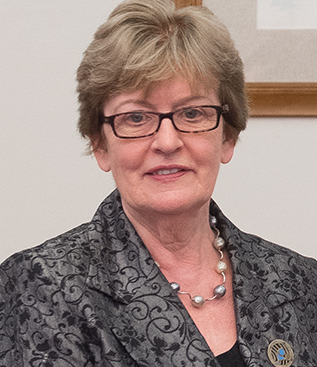
- Occupation: nursing

Annette Kennedy is an Irish nurse and nursing leader. She was President of the International Council of Nurses from 2017 to 2021. She was awarded a WHO Director-General’s Global Health Leaders Award in 2021, and has received honorary degrees from the University of Toronto and Dublin City University. Women in Global Health and WHO named Kennedy as one of more than 100 most influential nurse leaders in 2020.

== Biography ==
Annette Kennedy is an Irish nurse and nursing leader. She completed her BA in Nursing Studies and followed it up with an MSc in Public Sector Analysis. Kennedy was given an Honorary Fellowship from the Royal College of Surgeons in Ireland.

For 19 years, from 1994 through 2012, she worked as the director of the Irish Nurses and Midwives Organisation. She founded their Education, Research and Resource Centre. Kennedy was President of the European Federation of Nurses. She was elected vice-president of the International Council of Nurses and held the position for four years before going on to become 28th President of the International Council of Nurses in 2017. Kennedy also worked as a Commissioner for the WHO Independent High –Level Commission on non-communicable diseases for two years from 2017.

Kennedy was on the board of the Nursing Now Challenge, a global campaign established in 2018 to improve health by raising the status and profile of nursing.

Kennedy received a Global Health Leaders Award from the WHO Director-General in 2021 for her “outstanding and passionate leadership of the global nursing community”. During the presentation, Tedros commented that Kennedy’s “leadership, partnership, and dedication have played a crucial role in strengthening nursing over the past years”.

Kennedy was awarded an Honorary Doctor of Laws by the University of Toronto in 2022 for “her dedicated and influential leadership in the nursing profession, and for championing equity and inclusivity, human rights and universal health care”. Kennedy delivered the Verna Huffman Splane Lecture at the University of Toronto in 2022.

She has also received an honorary degree from Dublin City University in 2021. Women in Global Health and WHO named Kennedy as one of more than 100 most influential nurse leaders in 2020.
