= TextGrid =

German research group

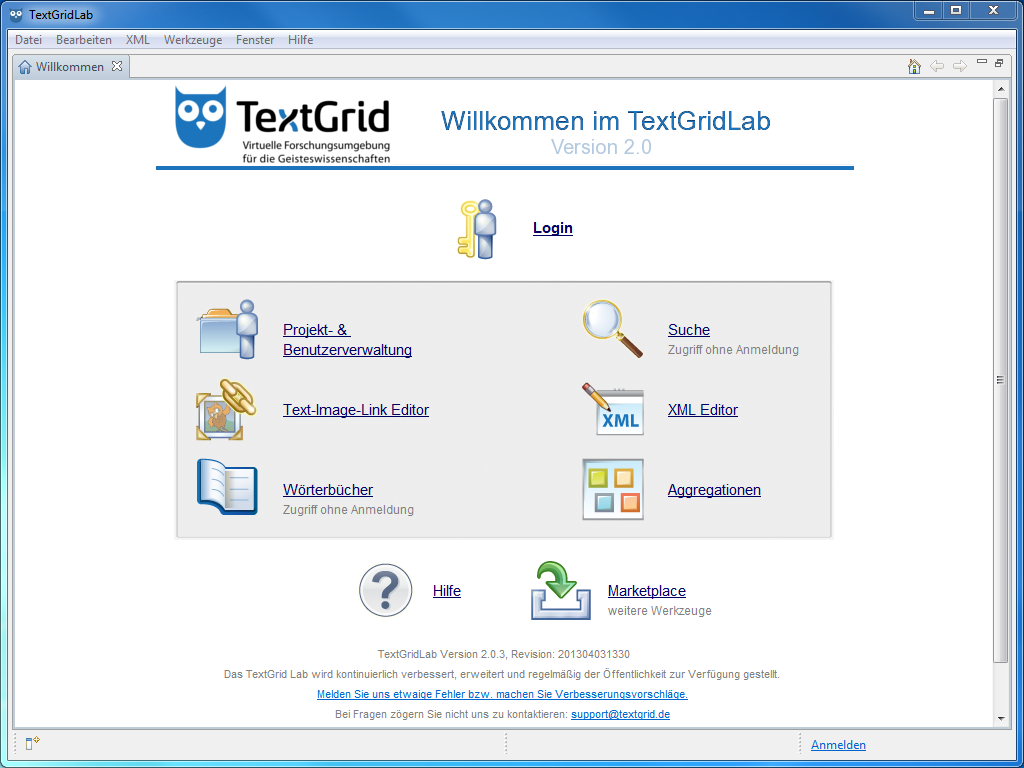
- TextGridLab 2.0.3 on Windows 7
- Developer: TextGrid
- Release: 2011
- Stable release: 2.0.3 / April 11, 2013; 13 years ago
- Written in: Java
- Operating system: Windows, macOS, Linux
- Licence: LGPL 3
- Website: textgrid.de/en

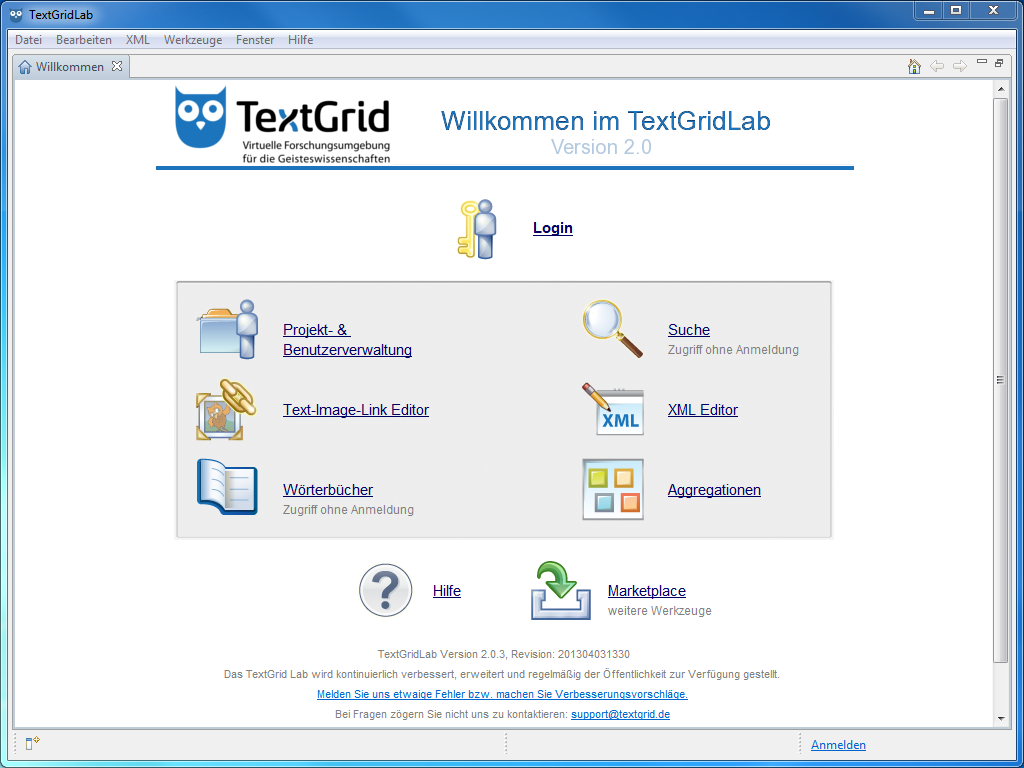
TextGridLab 2.0.3 on Windows 7

TextGrid is a research group with the goal of supporting access to and the exchange of information in the humanities and social sciences with the help of modern information technology (the grid).

The project is funded by the Federal Ministry of Education and Research (Germany). TextGrid is one project within the D-Grid initiative and part of WissGrid.

== Project phases ==
The TextGrid project started in February 2006. During the first phase of the project the development of the software begun. In consequence an infrastructure for the virtual research environment was built. During the second project phase (June 2009 to May 2012) a productive version of the software was created and the user base was broadened. Meanwhile, the project reached its third funding phase (June 2012 to May 2015) entitled "TextGrid - Virtual Research Environment for the Humanities". The objective within this phase is the transformation of the project for the continuous operation in financial, legal and technical terms.

The following partner institutions are participating during the third funding phase of TextGrid:

- Berlin-Brandenburg Academy of Sciences and Humanities, Berlin
- DAASI International GmbH, Tübingen
- University of Applied Sciences Worms, Faculty of Computer Sciences
- University of Göttingen, Göttingen State and University Library (project management)
- Gesellschaft für wissenschaftliche Datenverarbeitung mbH Göttingen
- Institut für Deutsche Sprache, Mannheim
- University of Würzburg
- Max Planck Institute for the History of Science, Berlin
- Technische Universität Berlin
- Technische Universität Darmstadt, Department for Literary Studies

== Software ==
Scholars from humanities and cultural studies can do their research on text-based data jointly or alone by using the TextGrid software. This environment consists of two main components:

- The TextGrid Repository is long-term storage of subject specific contents where digital research data can be stored. This is to guarantee the long-term availability and access to data and also to provide cooperation for the scholars.
- The TextGrid Laboratory is the client software of the virtual research environment and combines diverse services and tools within the interface that can be used intuitively. The TextGridLab can be extended and therefore be used by scholars from diverse fields of research and interest. The software is available for all prevalent operation systems.

== Further services ==
User of TextGrid are able to contact the developers of the software and further involved persons. For this purpose there are different open mailing-lists available. Furthermore, user meetings are arranged on a regular basis and training courses and workshops are offered.

== User projects ==
Meanwhile, a number of user cases and edition projects which are working with TextGrid are established. More information on these projects and their experiences with TextGrid can be found on the TextGrid Homepage.

== Literature ==
- TextGrid. In: Heike Neuroth, Martina Kerzel, Wolfgang Gentzsch (Hrsg.): Die D-Grid Initiative. Universitätsverlag Göttingen, Göttingen 2007, ISBN 978-3-940344-01-4, S. 64–66 ().
- Heike Neuroth, Felix Lohmeier, Kathleen Marie Smith: TextGrid. Virtual Research Environment for the Humanities. In: The International Journal of Digital Curation. 6, Nr. 2, 2011, ISSN 1746-8256, S. 222–231 ().
