= Brad Williams (puppeteer) =

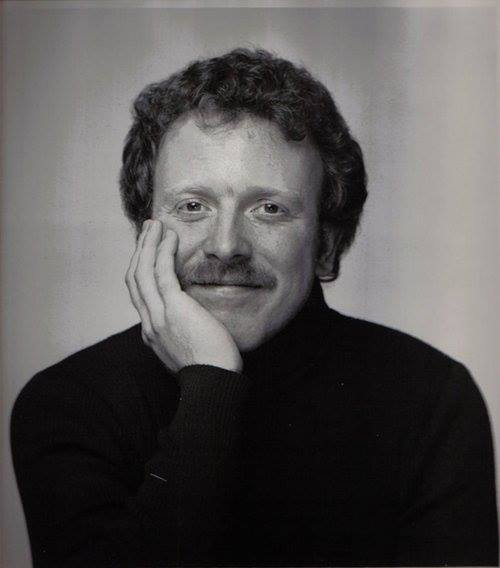
- Williams in 1987
- Born: January 8, 1951; White Plains, New York, U.S.
- Died: October 17, 1993 (aged 42); Grand Rapids, Michigan, U.S.
- Education: Hope College, University of Connecticut
- Occupations: Puppeteer, designer, teacher
- Years active: 1972–1993
- Known for: Pinwheel
- Board member of: Pandemonium Puppet Company; Union Internationale de la Marionnette; Association for Theatre in Higher Education; Screen Actors Guild

Bradford Cody "Brad" Williams (January 8, 1951 – October 17, 1993) was an American puppeteer, designer and teacher. He died from injuries sustained in a car accident at the age of 42.

He is named as one of the puppet artists whose legacy inspired the Eugene O'Neill Theater Center's National Puppetry Conference, an annual celebration of contemporary puppet theatre.

== Early life ==
Bradford Cody Williams was born to Robert Cody "Bob" Williams and Patricia Packard Williams on January 8, 1951 in White Plains, New York.

== Career ==
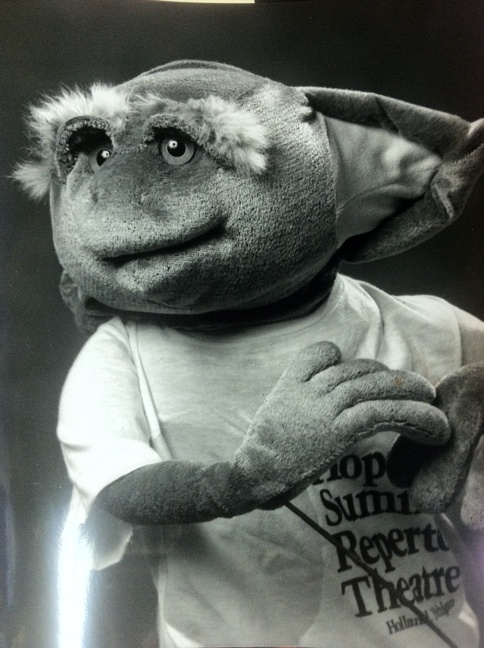
Zabar, Brad's alter ego rod puppet, was part of the acting company at Hope Summer Repertory Theatre in the summer of 1988

Williams grew up watching the Kukla, Fran and Ollie show and, after working with its creator Burr Tillstrom on the 25 year retrospective show, he enrolled at University of Connecticut and gained a Master of Fine Arts degree in puppet arts.

Williams co-founded Pandemonium Puppet Companyin Storrs, Connecticut. He was hired by Warner Communications creating and performing characters for the children's television program Pinwheel. He was the main actor of the television program Hocus Focus and also appears on the show credits as a graphic artist. He has also been described as a master calligrapher and logo designer, having created the logo for the 1989 Puppeteers of America Festival. He toured extensively with live puppet shows – often with his personal hand and rod puppet Zabar, an extraterrestrial found wandering the streets of the Upper West Side.

== Death ==
Williams was involved in an automobile accident on October 17, 1993, in Grand Rapids, Michigan. He was rushed to Butterworth Hospital, where he later died due to complications from his injuries, aged 42. He is survived by his mother, his sister Lorma Williams Freestone, his brother-in-law Kenneth Dale Freestone, and his nieces and nephews Aubrey Freestone Garcia and her husband, Manny Garcia; Cody Scott Freestone and his wife, Amber Emery, and Robert Schrader and Wayne Schrader. Williams' father died at his home on July 11, 2011 at the age of 89.

== Exhibitions ==
His work was featured in a 1996 exhibition called Puppetronics at Stamford Museum and Nature Centre, with puppets displayed including his Rex and Rita Readasaurus characters, which were created for Barbara Bush's American literacy program. Williams' contribution to the field of puppetry was also recognized in a 1997 exhibition at the University of Connecticut's Ballard Institute and Museum of Puppetry.

== Teaching and volunteer work ==
Williams' obituary in The New York Times noted his teaching and volunteer work, which included artist in residence roles at Ithaca College and the National Technical Institute for the Deaf. He received a certificate of appreciation from the City of New York for his work in the pediatrics ward at Memorial Sloan-Kettering Cancer Center.
