= Interview Waiver Program =

United States visa policy

The Interview Waiver Program (IWP), also called the Visa Interview Waiver Program, is a program managed by the U.S. Department of State's Bureau of Consular Affairs under which, under some circumstances, interview requirements can be waived for some nonimmigrant visa applicants. The program has basis in the guidelines provided in the Foreign Affairs Manual 9 FAM 403.5. As of December 2023, some of the previously present clauses of the Interview Waiver Program were retired, and all remaining clauses now have no set expiration date.

Applicants qualifying for interview waivers generally need to submit their passport along with various documentation to the US embassy or consulate processing their case. In some jurisdictions, the location that applicants submit the passport and documentation is called a "dropbox" location, and the terms "dropbox" or "dropbox appointment" may be used instead of "interview waiver" in some contexts.

== Guidance for the Interview Waiver Program provided in the Foreign Affairs Manual (as of 2024) ==
According to the Foreign Affairs Manual (FAM), 9 FAM 403.5-4, a consular officer may choose to waive an interview for a visa applicant if any of the below conditions apply. Some of the content of the FAM is not available to the public. The guidance offers considerable leeway for consulates and consular officers regarding whether to grant interview waivers; it only provides a set of necessary conditions that must be satisfied in order to grant an interview waiver. In particular, even if a visa application is initially made via document drop-off as the criteria for an interview waiver appear to be satisfied, the consulate may, at its discretion, or based on criteria (including criteria redacted in the public version) issue a 221(g) quasi-refusal and call the applicant in for a visa interview.

=== Background regarding "time of application" versus time of adjudication ===
Some of the provisions for the Interview Waiver Program refer to relative time since expiration of a previous visa (48 months for some of the cases below). The "time of application" that is used for these relative time calculations is the time that the visa application is submitted with payment of visa fee. This is clarified in 9 FAM 403.2-3 Definition of "Making a Visa Application", which is also referenced in 9 FAM 403.2-3(b)(iii) as part of the explanation for how to interpret the 48-month time limit.

a. For an NIV applicant, "making a visa application" requires the applicant to complete three components:

(1) Complete and submit a Form DS-160 for formal adjudication by a consular officer, signed electronically by clicking the box designated "Sign Application" in the certification section of the application;

(2) Pay the required application fee (also known as the MRV application fee) or provide evidence of prior payment of the application processing fee, unless the applicant is exempt from paying the MRV fee (see 9 FAM 403.4-3); and

(3) Provide all required biometric data. Biometric data is not complete until a photograph has been submitted and fingerprints, if required, have been collected. Fingerprints that have been collected by a locally employed staff member or collected off-site by a contractor meet this standard, even if they have not yet been verified by a cleared American.

b. Applicants who have submitted a photograph and who have ten fingerprints on file from a previous application have provided all required biometric data. Applicants who have two fingerprints on file from a previous application, and who have been ten-printed by a contractor for verification via IDENT, have supplied the required biometric information.

The scheduling of the appointment for the visa interview or document drop-off (the latter in case of an interview waiver) may be done later, within a prescribed time limit, and the actual appointment itself may be even later. For instance, in the case of India, the visa appointment or document drop-off appointment must be scheduled within 365 days of the visa application and fee payment, though the date it is scheduled for may be farther out than 365 days. In particular, the time of visa interview or document drop-off and time of subsequent adjudication steps need not fall within the 48-month time limit, in order for the interview waiver criteria to be satisfied.

=== Interview waiver based on age (9 FAM 403.5-2) ===
If none of the grounds mandating an in-person interview apply, a waiver may be given to applicants who satisfy either of the following two conditions:

- under 14 years of age; or
- over 79 years of age

Interview waivers based on age were largely phased out beginning on October 1, 2025, pursuant to an update issued by the Department of State on September 18 of that year.

=== Interview waiver for diplomats or officials (9 FAM 403.5-4(A)(1)(a)(1)) ===
Interviews may be waived for any of the following visa types, all of which bear some relations to government officials or diplomats:

- A-1 visa for ambassadors, ministers, diplomats, consular officers, and their immediate family members
- A-2 visa for government officials, employees, their immediate families, their technical and support staff
- C-3 visa for government officials and their families (the C-3 visa for attendants, servants, and employees is not eligible for an interview waiver)
- G-1 visa for designated principal resident representatives of foreign governments and their staff and immediate family members
- G-2 visa (similar to G-1 except that there is no work authorization)
- G-3 visa (identical to G-2 visa)
- G-4 visa
- NATO-1 visa
- NATO-2 visa
- NATO-3 visa
- NATO-4 visa
- NATO-5 visa
- NATO-6 visa
- TECRO E-1 visa

=== Interview waiver for diplomats or officials (9 FAM 403.5-4(A)(1)(a)(2)) ===
Interviews may be waived for any applicant for a diplomatic or official visa as described in 22 CFR 41.26 or 22 CFR 41.27 respectively.

=== Interview waiver for renewals (within 48 months after expiry) (9 FAM 403.5-4(A)(1)(a)(3)) ===
Interview waivers can be used if all these conditions hold:

- The applicant is renewing a nonimmigrant visa of the same classification within 48 months of the expiry of the previous visa. Both the visa classification and the category of applicant within that visa class (principal or derivative) should match up. The 48 months applies to the time the visa application is made; the adjudication may happen a little later.
- The applicant is applying in the consular district of their normal residence, unless otherwise prescribed in regulations that require an applicant to apply for a visa in the country of which such applicant is a national.
- In the case of F, M, and J applicants, the applicant's SEVIS record must indicate an "initial" or "active" status.

=== Interview waiver for H-2A and H-2B applicants (9 FAM 403.5-4(A)(1)(a)(4)) ===
Any of the below cases is eligible for an interview waiver:

- First-time H-2 applicants with no associated derogatory information
- First-time H-2 applicants with potential derogatory information that the officer can exclude as not rising to the level of an ineligibility without requiring the applicant appear for an interview
- Applicants for an H-2 NIV submitted within 48 months of the expiration of a previous NIV in any classification

=== Interview waiver for applicants with a prior nonimmigrant visa in another classification (9 FAM 403.5-4(A)(1)(a)(4)) ===
The exact criteria that need to be satisfied for eligibility for this interview waiver case have been redacted from the public version of the Foreign Affairs Manual.

=== Interview waiver by the Deputy Assistant Secretary for Visa Services (9 FAM 403.5-4(A)(1)(b)) ===
The Deputy Assistant Secretary for Visa Services may waive the interview requirement in individual cases after determining that such a waiver is necessary due to unusual or emergent circumstances. Visa officers reviewing a case may escalate such cases for attention by contacting the VO/F post liaison.

=== Interview waiver by the Secretary of State (9 FAM 403.5-4(A)(1)(b)) ===
The Secretary of State may waive the interview requirement in individual cases after determining that such a waiver is in the national interest of the United States. Visa officers reviewing a case may escalate such cases for attention by contacting the VO/F post liaison.

== Process ==
=== Stage in the visa application process where the interview waiver option becomes available ===
The Interview Waiver Program works as follows. Applicants apply for a visa by filling in Form DS-160 online on the Department of State's Consular Electronic Application Center website, just as they would for a visa application with an interview. After submitting Form DS-160, the applicant may then use the Form DS-160 confirmation number to apply for a nonimmigrant visa at the consulate. As of 2023, the website through which nonimmigrant visa applications for US consulates can be done electronically is ustraveldocs.com (or an embassy/consulate-specific site that it redirects the user to). The visa application process on this site includes a bunch of questions for the applicant, and based on the applicant's answers to the questions, the application informs the applicant whether they may be eligible for an interview waiver.

=== Applicant flexibility regarding the interview waiver ===
If an applicant qualifies for the interview waiver and also qualifies for an expedited interview, the applicant can choose either to schedule an interview or to exercise the interview waiver. If the applicant qualifies for the interview waiver and does not qualify for an expedited interview, the applicant must exercise the interview waiver.^{: relevant content is from 16:46 to 17:10}

The criteria to qualify for an expedited interview can vary based on the country the applicant is applying from; for instance, in India, as of October 2023, any of these could qualify an applicant for an expedited interview: medical needs, funeral/death, urgent business travel, students or exchange visitors, and ESTA denied. On the other hand, the criteria for requesting expedited appointments are narrower and more stringent in Pakistan.

=== Document drop-off (dropbox) (appointment may be needed in some jurisdictions) ===
Applicants who qualify for and select the interview waiver need to drop off their passport(s) and other supporting documents at a suitable drop-off location (called dropbox in some jurisdictions). Jurisdictions may differ in terms of whether an appointment is needed for document drop-off. For instance, in India, appointments became mandatory for document drop-off starting September 1, 2019.

For embassies/consulates and visa classes where an appointment is needed for the document drop-off, the appointment wait time in calendar days should be available on the visa appointment wait times page. Appointment wait times for a given embassy/consulate and visa class can be different between the interview case and the interview waiver (i.e., document drop-off / dropbox) case, with the wait times for the interview waiver case generally being shorter than for the interview case.

=== Waiting period between drop-off and receiving the passport ===
After the document drop-off, and until the applicant receives the passport back, the applicant must continue to stay within the country that he or she applied from, and should be prepared to attend a visa interview at the embassy or consulate that the original application was made to. It is generally not possible for the applicant to withdraw the passport at any time during the process, or to request expedited processing of the application. The wait time could range from a few days to several weeks; for instance, in India, the guidance to applicants is to allow "up to three weeks" for the process. Visa Grader reports, based on anonymized user submissions, a wide range 14 days and upward for approved visa applications.

== History ==
=== Rollout from 2011 to 2016 under the Obama administration ===
The Interview Waiver Program was rolled out gradually starting around 2011 under the administration of then-United States President Barack Obama. The rollout was incremental along two dimensions: the set of embassies and consulates where it is available, and the criteria for which an interview waiver is provided.

The IWP became available in India in March 2012 and was expanded in November 2012 to cover more categories.

The Interview Waiver Program became permanent in January 2014.

In a prepared statement at a hearing at the United States Senate Subcommittee on Tourism, Competitiveness, and Innovation on June 26, 2014, the U.S. Department of State Acting Assistant Secretary for Consular Affairs Michele Thoren Bond talked about the department's efforts to continue expanding the Interview Waiver Program to more applicants and use cases through better fraud detection techniques. One of the examples she gave was making citizens of Visa Waiver Program member countries eligible for the IWP when applying for other nonimmigrant visas. The statement also said that the Department of State looked forward to working with the United States Congress to pass legislation that would enable the Department of State and U.S. Department of Homeland Security to expand the program further.

=== Suspension by Donald Trump after becoming United States President in January 2017 ===
An executive order by Donald Trump on January 27, 2017, issued a week after Donald Trump assumed the office of President of the United States, asked for an immediate suspension of the Interview Waiver Program, pending review for compliance with Section 222 of the INA, 8 U.S.C. 1222, which requires that all individuals seeking a nonimmigrant visa undergo an in-person interview, subject to specific statutory exceptions. Dara Lind of Vox referred to the suspension of the IWP as the only concrete change to the visa screening process in Trump's executive order.

At around the same time as the executive order, Trump fired many key executives of the U.S. Department of State, including Michele Thoren Bond, who had delivered the statement about IWP in June 2014. Her prepared statement in the hearing on travel facilitation was also removed from the website of the Department of State's Bureau of Consular Affairs; however, a copy remains on the website of the United States Senate Committee on Commerce, Science, and Transportation.

=== Reinstatement in limited form in July 2017; further developments under the Trump administration ===
In July 2017, the Foreign Affairs Manual 9 FAM 403.5 was updated with new guidance on the criteria for interview waivers; the new criteria were significantly more restrictive than the criteria prior to Trump's executive order. Specifically, interview waivers were still possible based on age (less than 14 years or more than 79 years), diplomatic nature of visa, and visa expiration within the last 12 months. However, the previously allowed interview waivers for visas expired between 12 and 48 months prior were no longer allowed.

On May 14, 2019, the Interview Waiver Program was suspended for all visa renewals in Nigeria (waivers for diplomatic visas would still be allowed); this suspension happened one month after news that the Trump administration has been considering new immigration measures to impose visa restrictions on countries whose citizens have a track record of overstaying beyond the validity of their short-term US visas.

=== Return to Obama-era state under the Biden administration; further expansion ===
The COVID-19 pandemic led to partial shutdowns and reductions in hours at many US embassies and consulates, reducing the number of available visa appointments. As a result, the administration of President Joe Biden, upon coming to power on January 20, 2021, received feedback to return the Interview Waiver Program to its Obama-era state, specifically, by allowing for interview waivers in the case of renewals for visas that had expired within the past 48 months (4 years) rather than just within the past 12 months (1 year).

In March 2021, the Biden administration incorporated the feedback and temporarily expanded the Interview Waiver Program to cover visa renewals for visas that had expired within the past 48 months (4 years) rather than just within the past 12 months (1 year); the Foreign Affairs Manual 9 FAM 403.5 was updated to reflect this. The increase to 48 months was only effective till December 31, 2021. A special temporary set of interview waiver criteria for H-2 applicants, also available only till December 31, 2021, was introduced. The change was implemented by several U.S. embassies and consulates shortly thereafter. There were minor modifications to the language through 2021.

In early 2022, the Interview Waiver Program was extended and expanded, with the sunset date being removed entirely for the ability to use an interview waiver for visa renewals within 48 months of expiry (the previous sunset date was December 31, 2021), and the sunset date for the temporary H-2 provisions being extended to December 31, 2022 (from December 31, 2021). In addition, two new cases were made eligible for the interview waiver: applicants for some visa categories who had previously issued any type of visa (until December 31, 2022), and some first-time applicants, specifically those from Visa Waiver Program countries who satisfied some criteria. The expansion to first-time applicants from Visa Waiver Program countries had been mentioned in the June 2014 prepared statement by Michele Thoren Bond in the hearing on travel facilitation as an example of a potential future expansion of the Interview Waiver Program.

In December 2022, the temporary cases of the Interview Waiver Program, that were originally set to expire on December 31, 2022, were extended to December 31, 2023. Explicit exclusion of Nigeria from eligibility for some interview waiver categories was also removed around this time.

In December 2023, the H-2 case of the Interview Waiver Program (9 FAM 403.5-4(A)(1)(a)(4)), that had previously been scheduled to expire on December 31, 2023, was extended indefinitely. Other cases that had no previously set expiration dates also continued. However, the case involving applicants for an H-1, H-3, H-4, non-blanket L, O, P, or Q NIV in any classification who had previously been issued any type of visa (with no 48-month limit), that had originally been set to sunset on December 31, 2023, was sunset as planned and not extended. After these updates, there were no longer any categories for the Interview Waiver Program with explicitly stated expiration dates, though it was stated that the program would be reviewed annually.
