= Alice Girard =

American-born Canadian nurse (1907–1999)

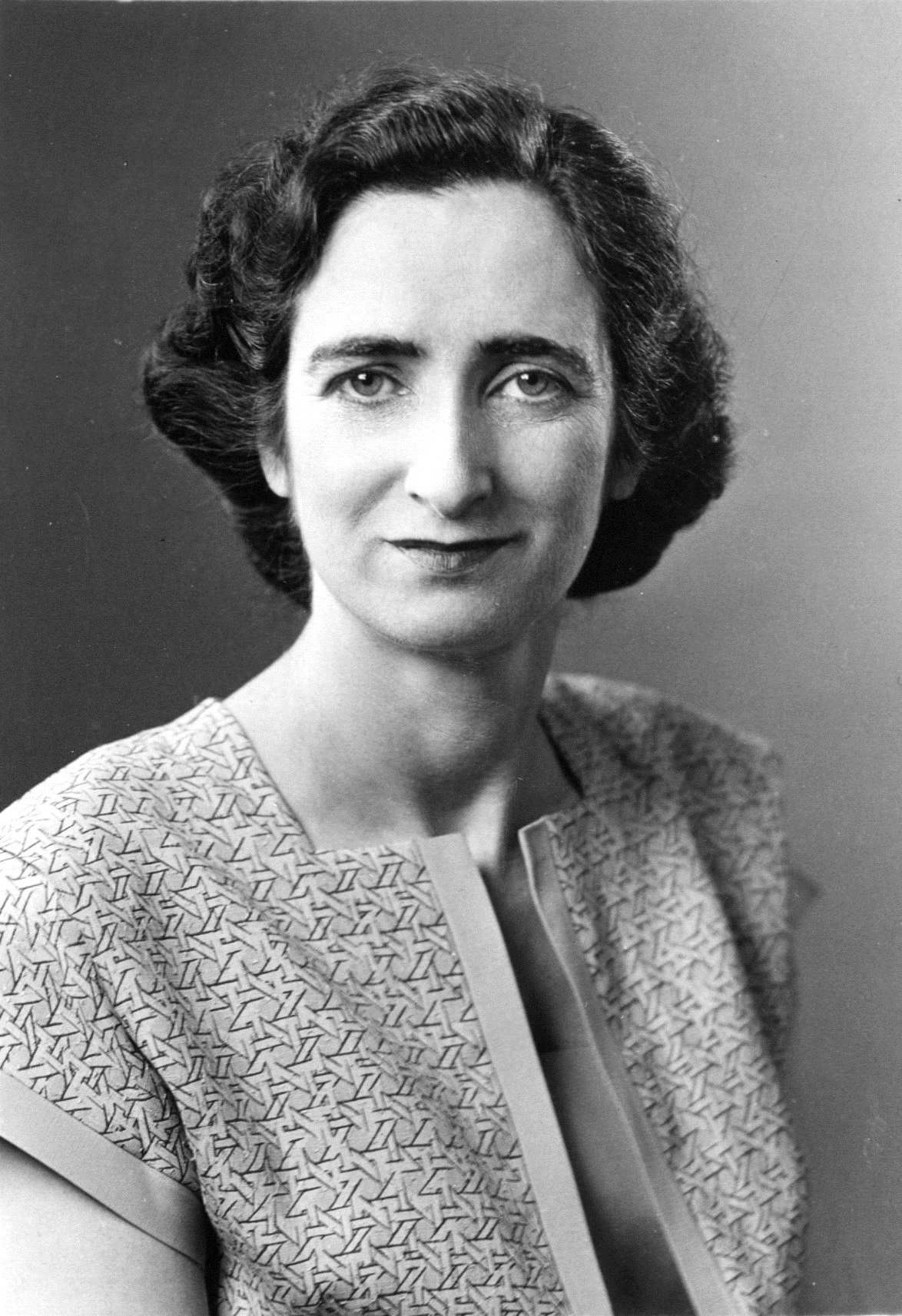
Girard in the 1940s

Alice Girard (1907 – January 1, 1999) was an American-born Quebecoise nurse who was made a Chevalier of the National Order of Quebec for 1994. She was a seventh child born in Connecticut to a family that originated in Quebec. They returned to Quebec when she was 11 and she decided to pursue a career rather than marriage, the two things being seen as somewhat mutually exclusive at that time. She rose to be the first French-speaking President of the Canadian Nurses Association and the first Canadian to head the International Council of Nurses. She also taught and in 1962 she became the first woman to be dean at the University of Montreal.

== Honours ==
- Honorary degrees from universities of Toronto (1968) and Montreal (1975).
- Centennial Medal and the Florence Nightingale Medal
- Commander of the Order of St. John (1977)
- Dame Commander of the Order of Saint Lazarus (1980)
- Member of the Club of the Rector of the University of Montreal (1992)
- Governor General's Award in Commemoration of the Persons Case (1994)
- Officer of the Order of Canada (1995)
- Knight of the National Order of Quebec
