= Form DS-160 =

Part of forms to fill for nonimmigrants before entering US

Form DS-160 is a form of the U.S. Department of State that needs to be filled in by all nonimmigrant visa applicants to the United States as part of their nonimmigrant visa application process. The form supersedes and replaces several other forms such as DS-156, DS-157, DS-158, and DS-3032, that were previously used for some kinds of nonimmigrant visa applications, so that now all nonimmigrant visa applications must use Form DS-160, though the older paper-based Form DS-156 may be used instead in some exceptional circumstances. The majority of nonimmigrant visa applicants do not need to complete any other Department of State form as part of the application process, though some E visa applicants may need to complete an additional form (DS-156E). A U.S. Department of State estimate from August 2022 is that 11,095,302 people (annually) fill Form DS-160 or Form DS-156 (and since DS-156 is filled only in exceptional cases, the majority of these would be Form DS-160) and that filling the form takes an average of 90 minutes per person.

== Filling and submission of the form ==
The DS-160 must be filled and submitted electronically via the website of the Consular Electronic Application Center (CEAC), a part of the U.S. Department of State. The applicant must sign the electronic DS-160 himself or herself, and vouch for the correctness of all entered data, even if others helped prepare the form. The online form allows for retrieval and editing of an existing application based on the application number as well as some applicant details, so that the whole application does not need to be filled in one session. Applications that were closed before those initial details were entered are not retrievable and a new application must be started. Unsubmitted applications are deleted after 30 consecutive days of inactivity (not 30 days after initial creation, but only if there is a gap of 30 days since the last update).

There is no fee for submitting a DS-160. Once submitted, a DS-160 application cannot be edited; however, if the submitted DS-160 has errors, a new DS-160 can be started with corrected information, and the application ID for the new DS-160 can be used for the visa application.

== Significance for visa interview ==
=== Inclusion of application ID ===
Embassies and consulates, or the online systems that they use for booking visa appointments, will generally ask for the DS-160 number as part of the process of booking an appointment for a visa interview (or document drop-off via the Interview Waiver Program). The DS-160 confirmation page (not the full application, just the confirmation page), with a scannable barcode, is one of the documents that the applicant is expected to carry to the visa interview or document drop-off location.

While the advice offered by the U.S. Department of State is to submit the DS-160 before booking the visa appointment, it may be possible to submit an application for a visa interview (or document drop-off) with the application ID of a DS-160 that has not yet been submitted, and make sure to submit the DS-160 prior to the actual interview and then carry the DS-160 confirmation printout to the interview.

If the DS-160 whose application ID was included when booking the interview is problematic (for instance, the applicant notices some mistakes, or the applicant fails to submit or loses access to the DS-160) it may be possible (depending on the embassy or consulate, as well as other information specific to the application) to fill in a new DS-160 and request the embassy or consulate to change the DS-160 application ID associated with the visa application before the actual interview.

=== Use in adjudication process ===
The DS-160 is one of the few documents that are always reviewed by consular officers as part of the adjudication process for visas. Most other documents are not directly reviewed by the consular officers, hence the DS-160 has been considered one of the most important documents to fill carefully. raising the relative importance of the DS-160. Ways that the DS-160 could be significant for the adjudication process include:

- Inconsistencies between data entered in the DS-160 and the applicant's answers in the interview process may raise red flags.
- Information that the consular officer can access through electronic systems, that the applicant should have filled in the DS-160 but did not fill in the DS-160, may raise red flags. For instance, if the applicant claims in the DS-160 to have never been refused a U.S. visa, but the Consular Consolidated Database shows a past refusal, this is a red flag that may lead to refusal if the applicant is not able to explain it.
- Incomplete work or educational history could raise red flags, that the applicant may need to clarify in the interview process.
- Inconsistencies in key biographical information (name, date of birth) between the DS-160 and passport could cause delays in adjudication.

== History ==
=== Introduction of Form DS-160 as an electronic alternative to Form DS-156 (that required paper signature) ===
Until 2007, several forms were used for nonimmigrant visa applications, including DS–156 (Nonimmigrant Visa Application), DS–156E (Nonimmigrant Treaty Trader Investor Application), DS–156K (Nonimmigrant Fiancé Application), DS–157 (Nonimmigrant Supplemental Visa Application), DS–158 (Contact Information and Work History Application), and DS–3052 (Nonimmigrant V Visa Application). In November 2007, the U.S. Department of State's Bureau of Consular Affairs submitted a 60-day notice of proposed information collection, seeking comments from the public, for consolidating nonimmigrant visa applications into a single Form DS-160 that was to be submitted electronically. The notice was published in the Federal Register in December 2007. The notice estimated that 12.3 million respondents would fill the Form DS-160 and the average time taken to prepare a response would be 75 minutes.

On April 22, 2008, a final rule was promulgated by the U.S. Department of State offering the completely electronic Form DS-160 as a (voluntary for now) alternative to Form DS-156, though Form DS-156 would continue to be available for cases where it was needed. Form DS-156, although available electronically, needed to be signed manually, but the Form DS-160 could be signed electronically as well. This final rule was published in the Federal Register on April 29, 2008.

=== Deprecation of paper-based Form DS-156 ===
Over time, the use of the paper-based Form DS-156 reduced significantly, and by 2017 it was limited only to exceptional cases.

A 60-day notice of proposed information collection in May 2017 listed the following cases where a paper-based Form DS-156 may be used:

- An applicant has an urgent medical or humanitarian travel need and the consular officer has received explicit permission from the Visa Office to accept form DS–156.
- The applicant is a student exchange visitor who must leave immediately to arrive on time for his/her course and the consular officer has explicit permission from the Visa Office to accept form DS–156.
- The applicant is a diplomatic or official traveler with urgent government business and form DS–160 has been unavailable for more than four hours.
- Form DS–160 has been unavailable for more than three days and the consular officer receives explicit permission from the Visa Office.

A 60-day notice of proposed information collection in June 2022 listed the following cases where the paper-based Form DS-156 may be used instead of the electronic Form DS-160; this includes the last three of the four allowed cases in the 2017 notice:

- Respondent is a student or exchange visitor who must leave immediately to arrive on time for his/her course and the consular officer has explicit permission from the Visa Office to accept form DS–156.
- Respondent is a diplomatic or official traveler with urgent government business and form DS–160 has been unavailable for more than four hours.
- Form DS–160 has been unavailable for more than three days and the officer receives explicit permission from the Visa Office.

A final rule in 2023 stated that "the Form DS-156 is the paper-based nonimmigrant visa application and can only be used in limited circumstances."

=== Changes to DS-160 questions and form structure ===
Around June 2011, an updated Form DS-160 was released, providing more clarity that the applicant must self-sign the form, and also clarifying the wording of a few questions and making other form changes.

In March 2018, a 60-day notice of proposed information collection was published, describing proposed changes to Form DS-160. The changes included the addition of questions related to social media handles as well as telephone numbers used within the past five years. A later notice would identify the impetus for this data collection as the Memorandum for the Secretary of State, the Attorney General, the Secretary of Homeland Security published in March 2017 under the presidency of Donald Trump. These questions, originally part of Form DS-5535, were merged into Form DS-160 by 2021.

In February 2021, a 30-day notice of proposed information collection proposed collecting more information from "a subset of visa applicants worldwide" (again pursuant to the Memorandum for the Secretary of State, the Attorney General, the Secretary of Homeland Security published in March 2017 under the presidency of Donald Trump) including:

- Travel history during the last 15 years
- Address history during the last 15 years
- Employment history during the last 15 years
- All passport numbers and country of issuance held by the applicant
- Names and dates of birth for all siblings
- Name and dates of birth for all children
- Names and dates of birth for all current and former spouses, or civil or domestic partners.
