= C3 Collaborating for Health =

C3 Collaborating for Health is a global, not-for-profit non-governmental organisation, based in London, that exists to find solutions to fight the epidemic of non-communicable diseases (NCDs).

== The C3 approach ==
C3’s focus is on the main risk factors – tobacco use, physical inactivity, and poor diet (including the harmful use of alcohol) – which between them cause the majority of many of the major NCDs – cardiovascular disease (heart disease and stroke), type 2 diabetes, chronic lung disease and cancers.

== C3's work ==
The United Nations Political Declaration on NCDs (September 2011) calls for a 'whole of society' approach to tackling NCDs. To this end, C3 works with a range of organisations that affect public health and prevention of NCDs, including health professionals and local community leaders, businesses, NGOs, researchers, planners and young people.

- Health professionals and local communities: Health professionals, local health advocates and researchers are well placed to use their knowledge and evidence to change attitudes and promote health and wellbeing throughout communities.
- Working with businesses: Businesses can develop their core activities to provide a wider range of healthy options for consumers and employee, creating an environment in which it is easier to make healthy choices.
- Workplace health: The workplace offers opportunities to help the working-age population – and, through them, their families and wider communities – to live healthier lives.
- Bringing together the many people and organisations that can influence health - e.g. through regular International Breakfast Seminars.
- Raising awareness of issues such as the 'early origins of health' (the first 1,000 days of life).

== Publications ==
C3 has produced a number of reports (e.g. on the benefits of physical activity for health) and also raises awareness of the importance of tackling NCDs and the risk factors through other media, e.g.:

- letters on cycling in The Times and walking in The Economist;
- journal articles, e.g. in Globalization and Health, Nursing Education Today, and the Nursing Standard.

== Further information ==
C3 was founded in 2009 by Christine Hancock, former general secretary of the Royal College of Nursing and past president of the International Council of Nurses. C3 is a registered charity (no. 1135930) and a company limited by guarantee (no. 6941278), registered in England and Wales.
