= Peter Carter (nurse) =

British nurse (born 1949)

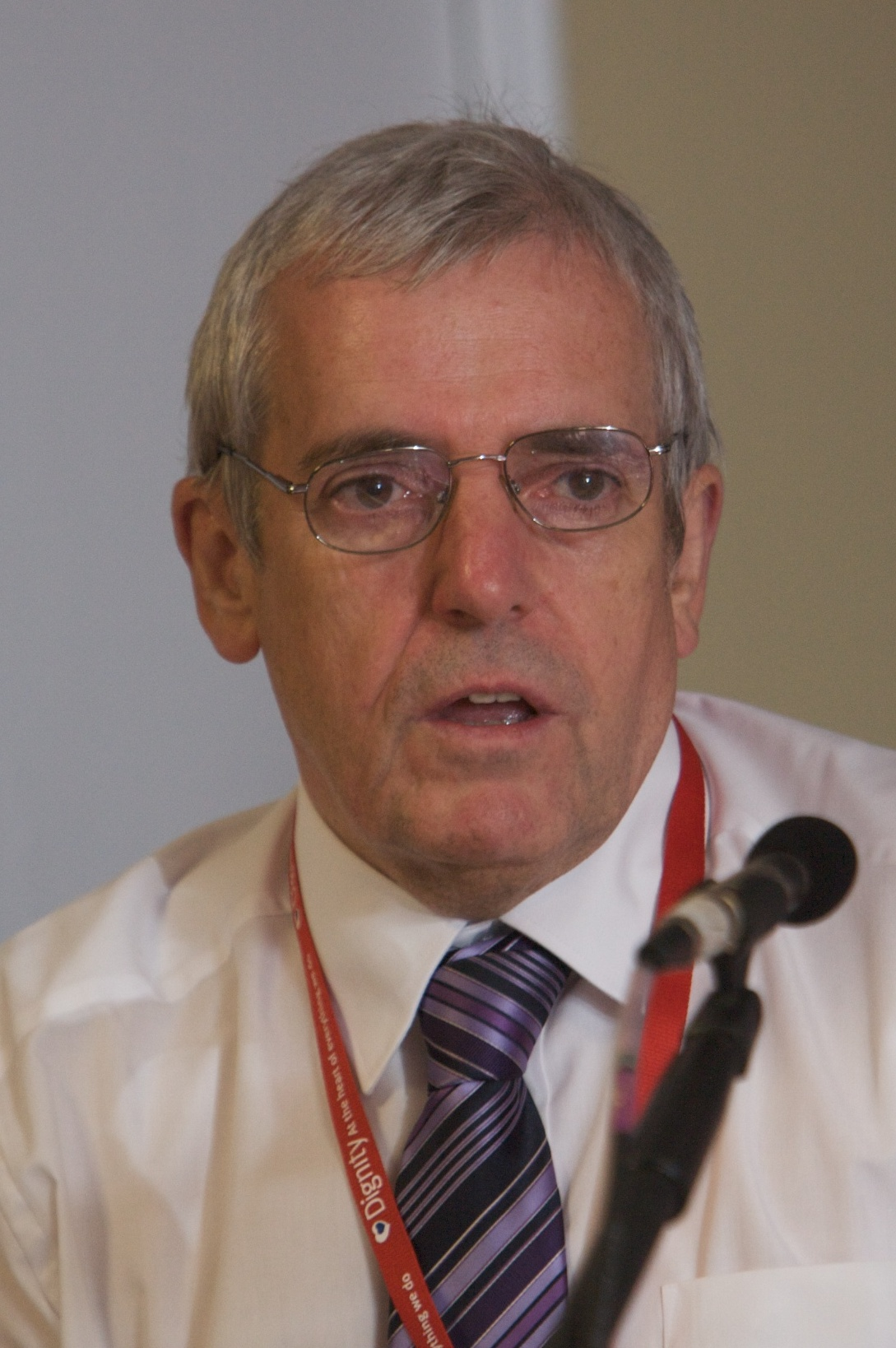
Peter Carter in September 2009

Peter Carter, OBE (born 1949) is an independent healthcare consultant and a former General Secretary of the Royal College of Nursing. He is a Fellow of the Royal College of Nursing, and Hon fellow of the Royal College of General Practitioners and an Ad Eundem of the Royal College of Surgeons of Ireland.

== Career ==
Peter Carter trained for three years as a psychiatric nurse at Hill End Hospital in St Albans, undertaking further training in family therapy and crisis intervention.

Carter is also a general nurse and trained at St Albans City Hospital and the Institute of Urology in London, and held clinical and managerial posts in Hertfordshire, Bedfordshire and London.

He started his managerial education at the Chartered Institute of Personnel and Development, and got an MBA and PhD from the University of Birmingham. He spent almost twelve years as the Chief Executive of the Central and North West London Mental Health NHS Trust, and in January 2007 became general secretary and Chief Executive for the Royal College of Nursing (RCN). He sat on the Prime Minister's independent commission that published the Front Line Care (Report) in 2010.

In July 2013, Carter was awarded an honorary doctorate by Edge Hill University. He was appointed OBE for services to the National Health Service (NHS) in the 2006 New Year's Honours list. In 2011 he was awarded the inaugural Presidents medal of the Royal College of Psychiatrists.

He is visiting professor at Anglia Ruskin University, Canterbury Christchurch University, Chester University and King's College London, and vice president of the Institute of Customer Service.

== Royal College of Nursing ==
Carter succeeded Beverly Malone as general secretary of the Royal College of Nursing in January 2007. After becoming the general secretary and chief executive of the RCN, Peter Carter restructured his top team and re-focused the organisation to address outstanding issues and the ongoing reforms of the NHS. Under his leadership, the RCN established itself as a leading voice on nursing and health in the UK political arena. He was said by the Health Service Journal to be the 28th most powerful person in the English NHS in December 2013.

The RCN won awards under his leadership as an exemplar employer – obtaining a Gold award from Investors in People and, since 2010, being in the Sunday Times Best 100 Not for Profit Organisations. At the time of his leaving the RCN in 2015, the RCN membership had reached its highest-ever membership of over 430,000.

Carter was awarded Fellowship of the Royal College of Nursing in 2020.

== Interim appointments ==
On 9 November 2016, the Medway NHS Foundation Trust announced Carter had been appointed interim chair, whilst a new chair was appointed on a permanent basis. In October 2017 he was appointed to the same role at East Kent Hospitals University NHS Foundation Trust and served until March 2018. He has also served as interim chair of North Middlesex NHS University Trust.
