= Charlie's Climbing Tree =

Swedish animated television series

- Screenplay by: Olof Landström, Peter Cohen
- Composer: Jojje Wadenius
- Country of origin: Sweden
- Original language: Swedish

Production
- Producer: Peter Cohen
- Production company: POJ-filmproduktion

Original release
- Network: Sveriges Radio-TV
- Release: 25 December 1975 (Sweden) – 1976 (Sweden)

Charlie's Climbing Tree (Swedish: Kalles klätterträd, translated as Kalle's climbing tree in English) is a Swedish animated television series, lasting from 1975 until 1976. Created by Olof Landström and Peter Cohen, produced by POJ-filmproduktion. The show's theme music is performed by Jojje Wadenius and narration done by Toivo Pawlo. The programme was recorded in a total of twelve sections of about eight minutes, and the first broadcast on Sveriges Television on 25 December 1975. The programme is one of the best known Swedish children's programmes of the 1970s, partly because of the theme song. It was dubbed into an English-language adaptation and aired on ITV in the United Kingdom and Nickelodeon in the United States during the early to mid-1980s as part of Pinwheel in the United States. Graeme Garden provided the narration.

== See also ==
- Den vita stenen
- Fem myror är fler än fyra elefanter
- Julkalendern
- Pojken med guldbyxorna
- Trazan & Banarne
