= Pinwheel (TV series) =

American children's television series

- Genre: Preschool; Educational
- Created by: Vivian Horner
- Starring: Franci Anderson; Caroline Cox Loveheart; George James; Dale Engle; Arline Miyazaki; Betty Rozek; Lindanell Rivera
- Voices of: Brad Williams; Jim Jinkins; Craig Marin; Olga Felgemacher
- Opening theme: "Welcome to Pinwheel House" (1977–1979) "Pinwheel Theme" (1979−1984)
- Ending theme: "Goodbye from Pinwheel House" (1977–1979) "Pinwheel Theme" (1979−1984)
- Composer: George James
- Country of origin: United States
- Original language: English
- No. of seasons: 5
- No. of episodes: 260

Production
- Executive producers: Vivian Horner; Lois Fortune
- Producer: Sandy Kavanaugh
- Production locations: Columbus, Ohio (1977–79); New York City (1979–84)
- Running time: 60 minutes

Original release
- Network: C-3 (1977–79); Nickelodeon (1979–88); Nick Jr. (1988–90)
- Release: December 1, 1977 – July 31, 1984

Related
- Eureeka's Castle

Pinwheel is an American educational children's television series. It is the first series to have been broadcast on the then-rebranded Nickelodeon, and then the first on its Nick Jr. block as reruns until 1990. The target audience is preschoolers aged 2 to 5. It was created by Vivian Horner, an educator who spent her earlier career at the Children's Television Workshop, the company behind PBS's Sesame Street. The show was geared to the "short attention span of preschoolers", with each episode divided into short, self-contained segments including songs, skits, and animations from all over the world.

The series is set in a boarding house called Pinwheel House, which is powered by a pinwheel on the roof. The house's residents are a mix of live-action humans and puppets. Most songs are in the style of a wind-up music box.

Pinwheel premiered on December 1, 1977, on Channel C-3 of QUBE's local cable system in Columbus, Ohio. In April 1979, Channel C-3 expanded into a national television network, now rebranded Nickelodeon. Pinwheel continued to air on the network until 1990, and exclusively during the new Nick Jr. block starting in 1988. It was gradually phased out in favor of another preschool series, Eureeka's Castle.

After Paramount Skydance Corporation merged with Warner Bros. Discovery to form Skydance Corporation on October 6, 2026, the series is currently owned by Skydance TV since the Warner-Amex Cable days.

== History ==
Pinwheel was created by Vivian Horner and produced by Sandy Kavanaugh, two educators who had previously worked at the Children's Television Workshop. The show was created for QUBE, a local cable system tested in Columbus, Ohio. QUBE's developers wanted to offer a series for preschoolers, so they hired Horner and Kavanaugh based on their past experience in preschool television. Starting in December 1, 1977, Pinwheel was shown on Channel C-3, one of the experimental channels offered to QUBE subscribers. The channel was cited as "the world's first TV channel geared strictly to preschoolers".

In 1979, Pinwheel was expanded into a national network rebranded Nickelodeon (now part of Paramount). Pinwheel was reformatted as a series of hour-long episodes shown in three- to five-hour blocks, a format which eventually became the standard for Nickelodeon's Nick Jr. block. A total of 260 Pinwheel episodes were produced from 1977 to 1984. For international distribution, Nickelodeon edited Pinwheel into a package of half-hour episodes. It aired in Canada on Superchannel (from 1983 to 1988) and TVOntario (from 1990 to 1993). The series was also broadcast in the UK on the now-defunct children's cable and satellite television network The Children's Channel from 1985-1987. It was shown in a few Asiatic countries, including Channel 5 in Singapore, TV1 and TV2 in Malaysia, and ATV World in Hong Kong as part of their afternoon children's programming block Tube Time.

On January 4, 1988, Nickelodeon introduced the Nick Jr. block, a weekday morning block for preschoolers, to its schedule. Pinwheel is the first series that aired as part of the block. Pinwheel continued to air as an essential of Nick Jr. until its last rerun on July 6, 1990. Another puppet series for preschoolers, Eureeka's Castle, was made to replace it. In an article titled "Nickelodeon's New Lineup for Preschoolers", the Los Angeles Times called Eureeka's Castle a successor series to Pinwheel.

== Premise ==
Pinwheel is set in and around a large Victorian-style boarding house, dubbed "Pinwheel House", which is powered by a pinwheel on one of the peaks. Live-action characters interact with puppets, discussing several concepts familiar to children's programming such as sharing, being considerate, the environment, and colors. All of the characters live and work in different areas in and around the house. The Ohio-filmed episodes relied heavily on songs mostly performed by Jake. A package of children's shorts from Coe Film Associates was shown as inserts between the show's actual puppet and human segments.

Pinwheel underwent several changes when it moved to nationwide television in 1979. Taping of Pinwheel moved to Matrix Studios in New York City, where the set was rebuilt. Arline Miyazaki, Betty Rozek, and Dale Engel joined the cast as Kim, Sal, and Smitty. Craig Marin and Olga Felgemacher created new puppet characters. A collection of short films by Coe Film Associates became inserts for other earliest Nickelodeon shows, including Hocus Focus and By the Way.

== Characters ==
=== Humans ===
The characters are ordered by the first-season credits, with later cast members added at the end.

- Franci (Franci Anderson) - a storyteller who likes to write and perform in plays. She keeps a terrarium that houses a group of small alien marionettes dubbed "The Wonkles", and liked to sketch pictures as she tells stories. She only appeared in the first season.
- Coco (Caroline Cox Loveheart from 1977 to 1979, Lindanell Rivera from 1979 to 1984) - a Parisian mime who never speaks and has a knack for fixing things. She often hosts her own segments, performing magic tricks and mime routines while an off-screen narrator describes her actions.
- Jake (George James) - a boarder who enjoys music. He collects unusual sounds in small boxes and opens them up whenever he needs musical inspiration. He keeps a wide variety of musical instruments in his room, and he shows them unconventionally on a coatrack.
- Smitty (Dale Engle) and Sal (Betty Rozek) - an elderly couple who run a local newspaper called The Daily Noodle. One of Smitty's long-running obsessions is to capture a photograph of the elusive Admiral Bird for the front page of the Daily Noodle, though he constantly misses his chance.
- Kim (Arline Miyazaki) - Aurelia's niece, who is the resident artist of Pinwheel House. She is commonly seen wearing a painter's smock and carrying a painting palette. In addition to painting, she sometimes makes sculptures.

=== Puppets ===
- Aurelia (Brad Williams) - a bohemian-style character who is the owner and mother figure of Pinwheel House. She has a ginger bob, olive green eyes, fuchsia lips and wears colorful headscarves and large hoop earrings. She is friendly and happy-go-lucky, but firm and sometimes full of herself. She works as a fortune teller and has a dial-tone crystal ball that works like a telephone.
- Ebenezer T. Squint (Brad Williams) - a green-skinned inventor and part-time magician who talks in a whiny voice. He lives in a basement storage room where he makes machines and conspires to be featured in Smitty's newspaper. He pretends to be antisocial, but he secretly enjoys being included in the house activities. In his words, he liked to play as "the villain" and cause trouble for no good reason. He has collections of dust and pests.
- Luigi O'Brien (Brad Williams) - an Italo-British produce vendor who runs a small food stand in the backyard of the boarding house. He has a happy-go-lucky, relaxed attitude and is often a source of advice. All of his produce items talk, sing, and have individual personalities, but they are only known by their respective fruit and vegetable names (Pear, Tomato, etc.).
- Plus and Minus (Brad Williams and Jim Jinkins) - Aurelia's twin nephews who live in the attic room. The color schemes for the twins were the exact opposite, with Plus having black hair and orange skin and Minus with white hair and purple skin. Minus is very upbeat and energized, while Plus is more thoughtful and easily not to courage. A recurring sketch is Plus's attempt to board a spaceship to the moon, and Minus distracting him and causing him to miss the take-off. Their favorite game is "Gotcha Last," a combination of tag and hide-and-seek.
- Molly the Mole (Olga Felgemacher) - an elderly mole who lives in a tree in the backyard and often introduces animated shorts in the form of telling stories. She is sometimes visited by another mole named Leo.
- The Admiral Bird (Craig Marin) - a bright red bird marionette who is known for being elusive and hard to catch. He often drops from the sky with a strange, echoing call. It is Smitty's dream to capture a picture of the Admiral Bird for his newspaper, but he never succeeds. The Admiral Bird enjoys teasing Smitty.
- Silas the Snail (Craig Marin) - an elderly snail who is constantly on his way to an annual snail gathering. He never makes it further than the back garden due to snails being so slow. He extolls the values of slowing down and enjoying life, telling people that "half the fun is getting there."
- The Hobo Bugs (Craig Marin and Olga Felgemacher) - a sibling pair of marionettes named Herbert and Lulu. They like to dance and play on the hedges in the backyard, and they often visit Luigi's produce stand to ask for special items, such as an impossible pair of custom sandals that Luigi somehow manages to produce. They also love to play with Ebenezer, who typically tells them to leave him alone in a grouchy manner, even though he really enjoys their company.
- The Wonkles (Franci Anderson) - a group of extraterrestrial marionettes from the planet Zintar who live in Franci's garden terrarium. Three of them are bird-like: Tika (yellow-and-pink), Gorkle (blue), and Woofle (red). A fourth Wonkle, an abstract-looking green creature named Sorbin, also visits occasionally. They were retired from the show along with Franci and Spiderbelle in 1979.
- Spiderbelle (Franci Anderson) - a purple spider marionette who wears a bonnet. She was retired from the show along with Franci and the Wonkles in 1979.

== List of shorts ==
Nickelodeon secured the rights to several international short segments (usually acquired from Coe Film Associates), including those that were already wrote in English, such as the Franco-British children's show The Magic Roundabout. Pinwheel became a showcase for these acquisitions and featured a wide variety of both cel-animated and stop-motion animation shorts or cartoons from different countries.

- The Adventures of the Mole
- The Adventures of Mr. Rossi
- Alfie Atkins
- Balthazar le Mille-pattes
- Bod
- Brumme og Co.
- Bernard and Barney (Brundibáři)
- Bunny in the Suitcase
- Chapi Chapo
- Charlie's Climbing Tree
- Crystal Tipps and Alistair
- Curious George
- Emily
- Hattytown Tales
- Indendørslege
- Jim & Jam
- King Rollo
- Lille P.'s verden
- Lilliput Put
- Madeline (UPA short)
- The Magic Carousel
- Mixometric
- Die Sendung mit der Maus mouse spots
- Die Abenteuer der Maus auf dem Mars
- Musti
- The Naughty Owlet
- Paddington
- Peelie and Poolie
- Piggeldy and Frederick
- The Pilis
- Professor Balthazar
- Sally (O parádivé Sally)
- Schnoodle
- Simon in the Land of Chalk Drawings
- Unser Sandmännchen
- Vad är det som låter?

== Reception ==
The New York Times wrote that Pinwheel had "attracted praise from critics", and The Chicago Tribune called the show a "highly acclaimed Nickelodeon cable series for preschoolers". Writing for The New York Times in 1982, Alexis Greene commended Pinwheel for catering specifically to preschoolers and called the show "a colorful, well-written mix of songs and skits, puppets and 'real people'".
