= C3 Centauri =

Star in the constellation Centaurus

C^{3} Centauri
Observation data Epoch J2000.0 Equinox ICRS
- Constellation: Centaurus
- Right ascension: 11^{h} 37^{m} 33.98833^{s}
- Declination: −47° 44′ 50.2343″
- Apparent magnitude (V): +5.46

Characteristics
- Spectral type: K2 III
- B−V color index: +1.23±0.01

Astrometry
Radial velocity (R_{v})	−0.18±0.40 km/s
Proper motion (μ)	RA: −68.956 mas/yr Dec.: +16.362 mas/yr
Parallax (π)	9.5467±0.1227 mas
Distance	342 ± 4 ly (105 ± 1 pc)
Absolute magnitude (M_{V})	+0.30

Details
Mass	2.16 M_{☉}
Radius	15.85+0.30 −0.44 R_{☉}
Luminosity	95.8±1.5 L_{☉}
Surface gravity (log g)	2.12 cgs
Temperature	4,535+174 −43 K
Metallicity [Fe/H]	0.10 dex
Rotational velocity (v sin i)	>1.0 km/s

Other designations
- C^{3} Cen, CD−47°6997, HD 101067, HIP 56700, HR 4476, SAO 222917

Database references
SIMBAD	data

C^{3} Centauri is a suspected astrometric binary star system in the southern constellation of Centaurus. It has an orange hue and is dimly visible to the naked eye with an apparent visual magnitude of +5.46. The distance to this object is approximately 342 light years based on parallax. It is a member of the Hyades Stream of co-moving stars.

The visible component of this system is an aging giant star with a stellar classification of K2 III, which indicates it has exhausted the supply of hydrogen at its core then cooled and expanded off the main sequence. At present it has 2.16 times the Sun's mass and with nearly sixteen times the girth of the Sun. It is radiating 96 times the luminosity of the Sun from its swollen photosphere at an effective temperature of 4,535 K.
