= Christine Hancock =

British college secretary

Christine Hancock (born 12 February 1943) was the General Secretary of the Royal College of Nursing from 1989 to 2001.

She attended Orpington Girls Grammar School (now Newstead Wood School), and then began her nursing career at King's College Hospital in London. After various clinical nursing posts she became a ward sister or head nurse at the National Heart Hospital in London in a cardiac and coronary care unit doing advanced research.

She graduated from the London School of Economics and also worked as a midwife and a mental health nurse. A career in nursing management led to her becoming Chief Executive of the NHS in Waltham Forest in north-east London. In 1989 she began a twelve-year period as General Secretary/Chief Executive of the Royal College of Nursing www.rcn.org.uk She was elected unopposed as the 24th President of the International Council of Nurses in 2001. In 2009, she established C3 Collaborating for Health, a London-based charity with a global vision of stemming the epidemic of chronic disease through prevention. She was a governor of De Montfort University in Leicester from 2006 to 2015 and from 2007 to 2017 was a Trustee of the House of St Barnabas, a London charity helping homeless people get work. www.hosb.org.uk
