= D-Grid =

The D-Grid Initiative (German Grid Initiative) was a government project to fund computer infrastructure for education and research (e-Science) in Germany. It uses the term grid computing. D-Grid started September 1, 2005 with six community projects and an integration project (DGI) as well as several partner projects.

== Integration project ==
The D-Grid integration project intended to integrate community projects. The D-Grid integration project acted as a service provider for the science community in Germany. The project office is located at the Institute for Scientific Computing (IWR) at Forschungszentrum Karlsruhe. The resources to ensure a sustainable Grid infrastructure are provided by four work packages:

1. D-Grid Base-Software: The major task of this work package is to provide several different middleware packages. These are the Globus Toolkit, UNICORE, LCG/gLite, GridSphere and the Grid Application Toolkit (GAT). The community projects linked together in the D-Grid integration project are supported during the installation, operation and if needed and possible the customisation of the Base-Software.
2. Deployment and operation of the D-Grid infrastructure: Work package 2 builds up a Core-D-Grid. It was used as a prototype to test the operational functionality of the system. This work package also deals with monitoring, accounting and billing.
3. Networks and Security: The network infrastructure in D-Grid is based on the DFN Wissenschaftsnetz X-WiN. Work package 3 will provide extensions to the existing network infrastructure according to the needs of Grid middleware used in D-Grid. Further tasks are to build an AA-Infrastructure in D-Grid, develop firewall concepts for Grid environments and set up Grid specific CERT services.
4. D-Grid project office: The work package is responsible for the integration of community projects into one common D-Grid platform. Work package 4 also deals with sustainability.

== Communities ==
Six community projects participated in the D-Grid Initiative:

=== AstroGrid-D ===
AstroGrid-D, also referred to as the German Astronomy Community Grid (GACG), is a joint research project of thirteen astronomical institutes and grid-oriented computer science groups, supported by supercomputing centers. The main objective of AstroGrid-D is the integration of German research facilities into a unified nationwide research infrastructure in the field of astronomy. The goal is to improve the efficiency and usability of hardware and software resources including computer clusters, astronomical data archives, and observational facilities such as robotic telescopes. AstroGrid-D supports the standards of the International Virtual Observatory Alliance (IVOA) and cooperates closely with international projects on grid development.

AstroGrid-D is managed by the Astrophysical Institute Potsdam (AIP).

=== C3-Grid ===
At the Collaborative Climate Community Data and Processing Grid (C3-Grid) scientific researchers are trying to understand the earth system including their subsystems like oceans, atmosphere and biosphere. For the last decades, the amount of data has increased enormously in the field of climate research. On the one hand, due to rapid rise in computing power scientists are now able to use models with higher resolution and perform long term simulations. The scientists are able to couple models for the mentioned subsystems in complex cumulative simulations producing petabytes of output which is collected in distributed data archives. On the other hand, monitoring the earth with satellites results in a second huge data stream for climate research. Up to now, no uniform access to these distributed data is available what creates a bottleneck for the scientific research. The C3-Grid proposes to link these distributed data archives.

The management of C3-Grid has the Alfred Wegener Institute for Polar and Marine Research (AWI) in Bremerhaven. (For further information www.c3grid.de)

=== GDI-Grid ===
The GDI-Grid ("Geodateninfrastrukturen-Grid" - "Spatial Data Infrastructure Grid") project focuses on solutions for efficient integration and processing of geodata based on GIS and SDI technologies. The project will integrate GDI and Grid technologies in a working GDI-Grid infrastructure and thus demonstrate the complementarity of both fields of science. Distributed geospatial data—currently accessed via standardized GIS and SDI services—will build the basis for this endeavour. This data basis can be put to more use by processing it and merging it with other data, creating standards-based, multi-functional generic SDI services.

The project focuses on data, models, services and workflows for spatial data infrastructures. Services for integration, processing and management of spatial data are to be developed and implemented within the D-Grid infrastructure. A proof of concept will be given using a number of representative scenarios such as emergency routing for disaster management, flood simulation and sound propagation simulation.

The project is managed by the Leibniz University Hannover at the Leibniz University IT Services (LUIS).

=== HEP-Grid ===
The HEP-Grid Project focused on High Energy Physics, Nuclear as well as Astroparticle Physics. The main task of HEP-Grid is to optimize the data analysis using distributed computing and storage resources. The project developments are extensions to the grid middleware from the Enabling Grids for E-scienceE project of the European Grid Infrastructure and Large Hadron Collider (LHC) Computing Grid (LCG) project. They provide significant improvements for data analysis of experiments currently taking data and for those planned at the proposed International Linear Collider (ILC).

For the HEP-Grid Deutsches Elektronen Synchrotron (DESY), "German Electron Synchrotron") in Hamburg collaborates with eight German research facilities and universities and a set of associate partners.

=== InGrid ===
InGrid is a community project in the field of Grid computing in engineering sciences. InGrid aims to enable engineering projects for grid-based applications and allow for the common, efficient use of common compute and software resources. Grid technologies were promised to combine with competences in modeling, simulation and optimization.

Five typical applications (foundry technologies, metal forming technologies, groundwater flow and transport, turbine simulation and fluid-structure interaction) are considered as showcases to cover the three central areas of computationally intensive engineering applications, that are coupled multi-scale problems, coupled multi-discipline problems, and distributed simulation-based optimization. In particular adaptive and scalable process models and grid based runtime environments for these tasks are developed.

The support of virtual prototyping and the optimization of scientific engineering operational sequences is an emphasis of the project. The project management for InGrid is provided by the High Performance Computing Center (Höchstleistungsrechenzentrum) Stuttgart (HLRS) of the University of Stuttgart.

=== MediGRID ===
The joint project MediGRID unifies research institutes in medicine, biomedical informatics and life sciences into a consortium. Partners are from industry, healthcare and research facilities.

The main goal of MediGRID is the development of agGrid middleware integration platform enabling eScience services for biomedical life science. The project formed four modules (middleware, ontology, resource fusion and eScience), and developed a grid infrastructure for biomedical users. The user communities are represented in three research modules for biomedical informatics, image processing and clinical research.

=== SuGI ===
SuGI - Sustainable Grid Infrastructure - is a gap project of the German Grid Initiative. Its major task is to disseminate the knowledge of grid technology and to enhance its use. Thus, SuGI addresses all academic computing centers as well as enterprises, which still have not adopted grid technology. They will be supported in providing grid resources and services.

Experiences in the D-Grid projects will be made available to these institutions. Thus, SuGI offers own training courses; attends to external courses, create video and audio recordings and provide these online to the D-Grid communities via a scaling training infrastructure SuGI-Portal. SuGI claimed to develop training systems for grid middleware, simplify installation and servicing procedures, and work on the development and evaluation of legal and organizational structures.

=== TextGrid ===
While grid technologies were developed for the natural and the life sciences, there are opportunities for deploying Grid computing and e-Science concepts in other areas as well. TextGrid is a grid project in the humanities, and uses the buzzword "e-Humanities".

TextGrid promised to create a grid-based infrastructure for the collaborative editing, annotation, analysis and publication of specialist texts for researchers in philology, linguistics, and related fields. In addition to providing a comprehensive toolset, the project establishes an open platform for other projects to plug into the TextGrid.

=== ValueGrids ===
ValueGrids developed service level management in service value networks. This was supposed to enable providers of Software-as-a-Service solutions to utilize grid infrastructures and leverage the German national grid infrastructure.

The ValueGrids project partners are: SAP AG (Coordinator), Conemis AG, IBM Deutschland Research & Development GmbH, University of Freiburg and the Karlsruhe Institute of Technology.

== Partner projects ==
Several partner projects are involved in D-Grid.

=== WISENT ===
The e-Science project WISENT (Wissensnetz Energiemeteorologie) promised to optimize cooperation of scientific organizations in energy meteorology employing grid technologies. The main focus of research is the influence of weather and climate on transformation, transport, and utilisation of energy.

== Funding ==
More than 100 German research facilities were funded with about 20 billion Euros for 3 years by the German Federal Ministry of Education and Research.
