= NHS Modernisation Agency =

The NHS Modernisation Agency was an executive agency of the Department of Health in the United Kingdom. It was established in April 2001 to support the National Health Service in England, and its partner organisations, in the task of modernising services and improving experiences and outcomes for patients. Its functions were incorporated into the NHS Institute for Innovation and Improvement in 2006 or 2007, rendering it a defunct organisation.
