= CountryLine Radio =

Coordinates: 53°28′24″N 2°17′58″W

- United Kingdom
- Broadcast area: Manchester, Liverpool, Cambridge, Portsmouth, Norwich, Suffolk, Glasgow, Greater London

Programming
- Format: Country music

Ownership
- Owner: Countryline Media Limited

History
- First air date: 27 April 2013

Links
- Website: http://www.countryline.radio

CountryLine Radio is a UK-based radio station playing country music. Founded by Chris Stevens, it launched as Chris Country on 27 April 2013. The station is now owned by CountryLine, having purchased the station from Chris Stevens and Nation Broadcasting in March 2020 and its owners rebranded the station on 7 March 2022 to CountryLine Radio.

On 13 December 2023, it was announced that TuneIn and CountryLine Radio have signed a deal with The Big 615, a station owned by country singer Garth Brooks, and will rebrand as CountryLine Radio: The Big 615 in January 2024.

As of December 2023, the station broadcasts to a weekly audience of 36,000, according to RAJAR.

== DAB availability ==
CountryLine Radio is currently available in several areas of the UK. The station's first carriage agreements were on three of Ofcom's trial of small-scale DAB multiplexes - Manchester, Portsmouth and Cambridge. On 11 March 2016 the station launched on the London 2 DAB multiplex. A month later the station launched on the North East Wales DAB multiplex. Today the station can now also be heard on eight multiplexes.

== Programming ==
Much of the station's output is automated although recently the station introduced more presenter-led shows. Chris Stevens, the station founder, hosts the breakfast show and John Collins presents drivetime. Other presenters include Miles Myers-Cough Harris. The station also broadcasts country countdown programmes from America, including Bob Kingsley's Country Top 40, and other syndicated shows Nashville Access and Tim Rogers Classic Country. CountryLine Radio also broadcasts hourly news summaries from Radio News Hub.

== Chris Country Weekly ==
The station produces a weekly 3-hour syndicated show for commercial & community radio stations. It's presented by the station manager Chris Stevens and distributed via his company Devaweb. It plays the very best in current and classic country music, the same as that of the 24/7 radio station. Occasionally, there are special star guests from the country music scene that appear on the program and sometimes even perform acoustic live sessions.

== See also ==
- Country 1035, a 1994-2002 London based country music station
- 3C (radio), a station that broadcast country music across the UK on DAB radio until 2007.
