= Cytochrome-c3 hydrogenase =

Class of enzymes

cytochrome-c3 hydrogenase

Identifiers
- EC no.: 1.12.2.1
- CAS no.: 9027-05-8

Databases
- IntEnz: IntEnz view
- BRENDA: BRENDA entry
- ExPASy: NiceZyme view
- KEGG: KEGG entry
- MetaCyc: metabolic pathway
- PRIAM: profile
- PDB structures: RCSB PDB PDBe PDBsum
- Gene Ontology: AmiGO / QuickGO
Search
- PMC: articles
- PubMed: articles
- NCBI: proteins

In enzymology, a cytochrome-c3 hydrogenase (EC 1.12.2.1) is an enzyme that catalyzes the chemical reaction

2 H_{2} + ferricytochrome c_{3} $\rightleftharpoons$ 4 H^{+} + ferrocytochrome c_{3}

Thus, the two substrates of this enzyme are H_{2} and ferricytochrome c3, whereas its two products are H^{+} and ferrocytochrome c3.

This enzyme belongs to the family of oxidoreductases, specifically those acting on hydrogen as donor with a cytochrome as acceptor. The systematic name of this enzyme class is hydrogen:ferricytochrome-c3 oxidoreductase. Other names in common use include H2:ferricytochrome c3 oxidoreductase, cytochrome c3 reductase, cytochrome hydrogenase, and hydrogenase [ambiguous]. It has 3 cofactors: iron, Nickel, and Iron-sulfur.

== Structural studies ==
As of late 2007, 19 structures have been solved for this class of enzymes, with PDB accession codes 1FRV, 1H2R, 1UBH, 1UBJ, 1UBK, 1UBL, 1UBM, 1UBO, 1UBR, 1UBT, 1UBU, 1WUH, 1WUI, 1WUJ, 1WUK, 1WUL, 1YQ9, 1YQW, and 1YRQ.
