= 3C (radio station) =

Scotland
- Broadcast area: United Kingdom
- Frequencies: Before closure: DAB, Freeview, Online

Programming
- Format: Contemporary

Ownership
- Owner: EMAP Radio

History
- Call sign meaning: Continuous Cool Country

Links
- Website: www.3cdigital.com

3C was a United Kingdom radio station, based in Clydebank, Dunbartonshire, Scotland and was provided by Radio Clyde, owned by Scottish Radio Holdings, later bought by EMAP Radio. It played country music.

Its sister stations were Clyde 1 and Clyde 2.

On 26 March 2007, the station told listeners that it was closing at the next day, stating that

"It is the result of a brand review undertaken by our parent company, which operates a large number of radio stations and other media interests."

At 5pm on 27 March 2007, they played their final song (Tennessee by The Wreckers) and began re-broadcasting Clyde 1 on Freeview to see out the final year of the five-year contract.

== Successors ==
Bauer Radio launched Downtown Country in April 2015 as a sister service to Downtown Radio in Northern Ireland. The station is available on the Northern Ireland DAB multiplex. In 2019 Bauer launched a new contemporary country music station, Country Hits Radio, on DAB in various locations following a similar "contemporary country" format as 3C did.

Other country stations have also been made available to digital listeners. Chris Country launched on DAB radio in 2016 broadcasting to several regions including London and Manchester using newer DAB+ technology. Global launched Smooth Country in 2019, initially as an online stream through Global Player before expanding to a broadcast DAB station that September.

== See also ==
- 3C (disambiguation)
