= C30 =

C30 may refer to:

== Vehicles ==
Aircraft

- Caspar C 30, a German reconnaissance aircraft
- Cierva C.30, a Spanish autogyro
- Curtiss C-30 Condor, an American military transport aircraft
- Siren C.30 Edelweiss, a French sailplane

Automobiles

- Great Wall Voleex C30, a Chinese subcompact
- Nissan Laurel C30, a Japanese sedan
- Sauber C30, a Swiss Formula One car
- Volvo C30, a Swedish hatchback

Rail transport

- New South Wales C30 class locomotive, an Australian steam locomotive
- SL C30, a subway train of the Stockholm metro

Ships

- Brazilian landing ship Ceará (C30), a Thomaston-class landing ship of the Brazilian Navy
- HMS C30, a C-class submarine of the Royal Navy
- HMS Ceylon (C30), a Fiji-class light cruiser of the Royal Navy

== Other uses ==
- C30 road (Namibia)
- AMD C-30, a mobile processor
- Caldwell 30, a spiral galaxy
- King's Gambit, a chess opening
- Protecting Children from Internet Predators Act, an Act of the Parliament of Canada introduced as Bill C-30
- C30, a compact audio cassette
- C30 endopeptidase, also called 3C-like protease
