= Type C3 submarine =

Type C3 submarine may refer to:

- I-52-class submarine, also called Type C3 submarine or Type C Modified submarine (Junsen Hei-gata-kai), the first class submarine of the Imperial Japanese Navy
- Ha-7-class submarine, also called Type C3 submarine (C3-gata), the third class submarine of the Imperial Japanese Navy

== See also ==
- C-class submarine
