= C-3 (TV channel) =

Community 3 (C-3)
- Country: United States
- Broadcast area: Nationwide
- Headquarters: Columbus, Ohio, U.S.

Programming
- Picture format: 480i (SDTV)

Ownership
- Owner: Warner Communications
- Parent: Warner Cable Communications

History
- Launched: December 1, 1977; 48 years ago
- Closed: April 1, 1979; 47 years ago
- Replaced by: Nickelodeon

Community 3 (shortened to C-3) was a cable television network that was launched on December 1, 1977 as a part of QUBE, an experimental cable system created by Warner Communications. The only show C-3 carried was Pinwheel, a children's television show created by Vivian Horner. On April 1, 1979, C-3 was relaunched and expanded as Nickelodeon. Pinwheel continued airing on Nickelodeon until 1984.

On air and on guides during the time, C-3 was branded with the Pinwheel name and logo.

== History ==
Its history dates back to December 1, 1977, when Warner Cable Communications (later known as Time Warner Cable) launched the first 2-way interactive cable system, QUBE, in Columbus, Ohio. C-3 carried Pinwheel daily from 7:00 a.m. to 9:00 p.m. Eastern Time, and the channel was labelled "Pinwheel" on remote controllers, as it was the only program broadcast.

It was originally a preschool channel until 1979. Pinwheel became successful enough for Horner to expand her idea into a full channel on national television over a year later.

== Closure of the network ==
On April 1, 1979, C-3 was closed and replaced by Nickelodeon. After C-3 closed down, Nickelodeon was officially launched on April 1, 1979 (as the first-ever children's network) on Warner Cable franchises across the country. (The launch date, coincidentally, was Vivian Horner's birthday.) Initial programming on Nickelodeon included Pinwheel, Video Comic Book, America Goes Bananaz, Nickel Flicks, and By The Way, all of which originated at the QUBE studios in Columbus. For its first few years, Pinwheel was the network's flagship series, and it was played for three to five hours a day in a block format.
