= Alternative-complement-pathway C3/C5 convertase =

Identifiers
- EC no.: 3.4.21.47
- CAS no.: 80295-67-6

Databases
- IntEnz: IntEnz view
- BRENDA: BRENDA entry
- ExPASy: NiceZyme view
- KEGG: KEGG entry
- MetaCyc: metabolic pathway
- PRIAM: profile
- PDB structures: RCSB PDB PDBe PDBsum
Search
- PMC: articles
- PubMed: articles
- NCBI: proteins

Alternative-complement-pathway C3/C5 convertase (EC 3.4.21.47, complement component C3/C5 convertase (alternative), proenzyme factor B, properdin factor B, C3 proactivator, glycine-rich beta-glycoprotein, heat-labile factor, C3 convertase, C3b,Bb,CVF,Bb,C5 convertase, (C3b)n,Bb, complement C 3(C 5) convertase (amplification), alternative complement pathway C3(C5) convertase, C5 convertase, CVF,Bb, (CVF)-dependent glycine-rich-beta-glucoprotein, cobra venom factor-dependent C3 convertase) is an enzyme. This enzyme catalyses the following chemical reaction

Cleavage of Arg-Ser bond in complement component C3 alpha-chain to yield C3a and C3b, and Arg- bond in complement component C5 alpha-chain to yield C5a and C5b

This enzyme is a bimolecular complex of complement fragment Bb with either C3b or cobra venom factor.

== See also ==
- Alternative complement pathway
