= Gerda Höjer =

Swedish nurse and politician

- Born: 23 July 1893
- Died: 20 June 1974 (aged 80)
- Occupations: Nurse; Politician

Gerda Höjer (23 July 1893 - 20 June 1974), was a Swedish nurse and politician for the Liberal People's Party.

Gerda Höjer was a nurse and the president of the Swedish Association of Nurses from 1945 to 1960.

She was a member of the second chamber of the Riksdag (1949-1960). She was focused on social issues, particularly health and medical care policy.

She was awarded the Florence Nightingale Medal by the International Committee of the Red Cross after World War II. She was the President of the International Council of Nurses in 1947.

== Sources ==
- «Det blåser kallt», Omvårdnadsmagasinet, Svensk sjuksköterskeförening.
- «Gerda Höjer», Nationalencyklopedin.
- Harnesk, Paul (red.): Vem är Vem? Stor-Stockholm 1962, Stockholm: Bokörlaget Vem er vem, 1962, s. 618–19.
