= Tuberculosis Hospital of Pittsburgh =

- U.S. National Register of Historic Places
- U.S. Historic district
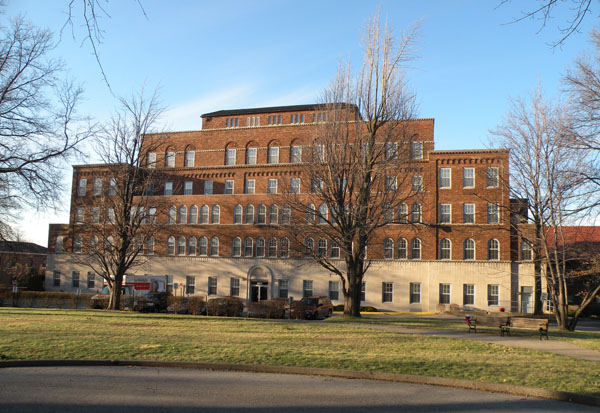
- Building D

- Location within Pittsburgh Location within Pennsylvania Location within the United States
- Location: 2851 Bedford Ave., Pittsburgh, Pennsylvania
- Coordinates: 40°27′12″N 79°58′8″W
- Area: 4.9 acres (2.0 ha)
- Architect: Mellon E. P.; Ingham, Boyd & Pratt
- Architectural style: Renaissance, Vernacular, Institutional
- NRHP reference No.: 93000073
- Added to NRHP: February 25, 1993

The Tuberculosis Hospital of Pittsburgh in the Hill District neighborhood of Pittsburgh, Pennsylvania, United States, is a complex of eight buildings, with the first building completed in 1912. It was listed on the National Register of Historic Places in 1993.
