= Nokia C3 =

Nokia C3 may refer to:

- Nokia C3-00, a 2010 feature phone with a QWERTY keyboard
- Nokia C3 Touch and Type or C3-01, a 2010 feature phone
- Nokia C3 (2020), an Android smartphone released in 2020
