= International Council of Nurses =

Federation of national nurses associations

ICN
- International Council of Nurses
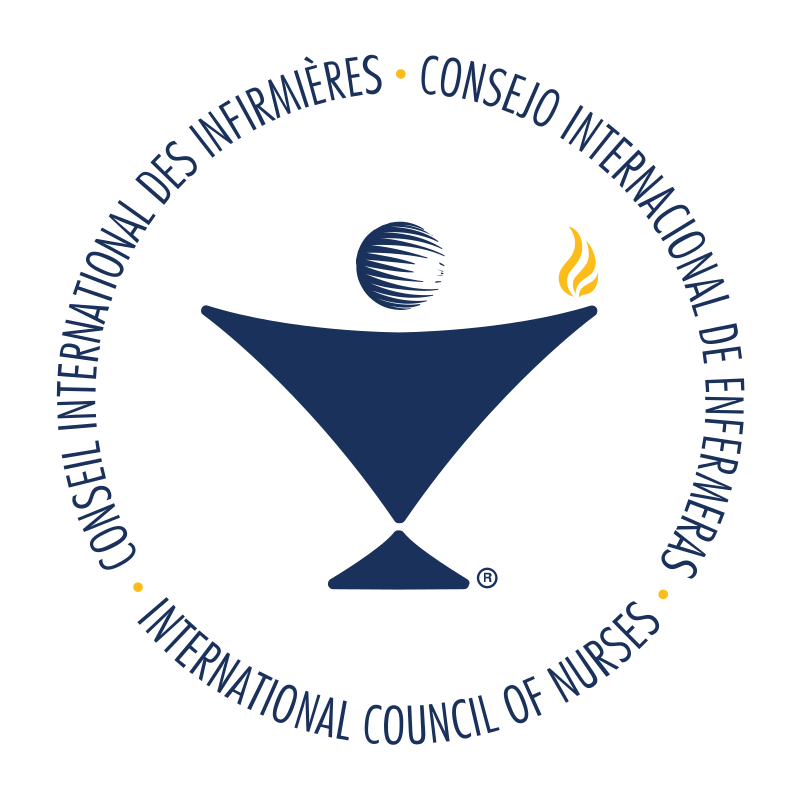
- Founded: 1899
- Headquarters: Geneva, Switzerland
- Location: International
- Members: 141
- Key people: Dr. Jose Luis Cobos Serrano, President & Howard Catton, CEO
- Website: www.icn.ch

The International Council of Nurses (ICN) is a federation of more than 140 national nurses associations. It was founded in 1899 and was the first international organization for health care professionals. It is headquartered in Geneva, Switzerland.

The organization's goals are to represent nursing worldwide, advance the nursing profession, promote the wellbeing of nurses, and advocate for health in all policies.

== History and organization ==
ICN was first proposed in 1899 at the Congress of the International Council of Women by Mrs Bedford Fenwick at a day devoted to consideration of nursing questions. The aim was to create a network of national nursing associations, with the objective of raising the standards of nurse education and professional ethics for the public good. A provisional committee was formed of nurses from Great Britain, the United States, Canada, New Zealand, Australia, South Africa, the Netherlands and Denmark. The first constitution and officials were elected in 1900: Mrs Bedford Fenwick (Great Britain) president, Miss Lavinia Dock (United States) honorary treasurer and Miss M Agnes Snively (Canada) honorary treasurer. In 1901, at the first International Congress of Nurses (held at the Pan-American Exposition ) ICN adopted a resolution in favor of nurse registration. The second ICN Congress was held in 1904 in Berlin by which time Great Britain, the United States and Germany had national nursing organizations affiliated to ICN.

Daisy Bridges was the General Secretary of the ICN until she retired in 1961. She later published A history of the International Council of Nurses 1899-1964 : the first 65 years in 1967 which she compiled during her retirement.

== Governance ==
ICN is governed by a Council of National Representatives (CNR). The CNR is the governing body of the ICN and sets policy, admits members, selects a board of directors, and sets dues. At its July 2025 meeting in Helsinki, Finland, there were 140 National Representatives (one for each member organization). National Representatives are selected by each member association. The CNR meets every two years.

Between meetings of the CNR, ICN is governed by a 12-member board of directors. Members of the board include the ICN president, 3 vice-presidents and 8 members elected on the basis of proportional representation from ICN's geographic areas. Members are term-limited to two consecutive four-year terms of office. The board meets at least once a year, although it usually meets three to four times a year.

ICN has four officers. They include a president and three vice presidents. The officers function as an executive committee for the board, and as the board's budget and finance committee. The president is elected by the CNR. The president serves a four-year term of office, and is limited to one term in office. The vice presidents are elected from among the board members. The highest vote-getter is the First Vice President, the second-highest vote-getter the Second Vice President and the third-highest vote-getter the Third Vice President.

Day-to-day operations of ICN are overseen by a chief executive officer (CEO) who works in close collaboration with the ICN President. Notable former chief executives include Daisy Bridges, Christiane Reimann, Judith Oulton, and David Benton. The current CEO is Howard Catton.

== Conferences and projects ==
ICN hosts a Congress every two years in conjunction with the meeting of the CNR. The congress hosts a large number of professional practice workshops, poster sessions, luncheons, speaking events and plenary sessions.

ICN Congresses:

- 1st Congress 1901 Buffalo, USA
- 2nd Congress 1904 Berlin, Germany
- (Interim Conference 1907 Paris, France)
- 3rd Congress 1909 London, U.K.
- 4th Congress 1912 Cologne, Germany
- 5th Congress 1925 Helsinki, Finland
- 6th Congress 1929 Montreal, Canada
- 7th Congress 1933 Paris/Brussels, France/Belgium
- 8th Congress 1937 London, U.K.
- 9th Congress 1947 Atlanta City, U.S.A
- (50th anniversary conference 1949 Stockholm, Sweden)
- 10th Congress 1953 Rio de Janeiro, Brazil
- 11th Congress 1957 Rome, Italy
- 12th Congress 1961 Melbourne, Australia
- 13th Congress 1965 Frankfurt, Germany
- 14th Congress 1969 Montreal, Canada
- 15th Congress 1973 Mexico City, Mexico
- 16th Congress 1977 Tokyo, Japan
- 17th Congress 1981 Los Angeles, USA
- 18th Congress 1985 Tel-Aviv, Israel
- 19th Congress 1989 Seoul, Korea
- 20th Congress 1993 Madrid, Spain
- 21st Congress 1997 Vancouver, Canada
- (ICN’s Centennial Anniversary Conference 1999 London, U.K)
- 22nd Congress 2001 Copenhagen, Denmark
- (1st ICN Conference 2003 Geneva, Switzerland)
- 23rd Congress 2005 Taipei, Taiwan
- (2nd ICN Conference 2007 Yokohama, Japan)
- 24th Congress 2009 Durban, South Africa
- (3rd ICN Conference 2011 La Valette, Malta)
- 25th Congress 2013 Melbourne, Australia
- (4th Conference 2015 Seoul, Republic of Korea)
- 26th Congress 2017 Barcelona, Spain
- 27th Congress 2019 Singapore
- 28th Congress 2021 Virtual (originally Abu Dhabi, UAE)
- 29th Congress 2023 Montreal, Canada
- 30th Congress 2025 Helsinki, Finland
- 31st Congress 2027 Taipei

ICN hosts other conferences on an as-needed basis. Recent conferences have covered topics such as regulation of the profession of nurses, socio-economic welfare issues, leadership issues and advanced practice issues.

ICN sponsors International Nurses' Day every May 12 (the anniversary of Florence Nightingale's birthday).

Official Journal of ICN: International Nursing Review (INR). This is a highly respected, scientific journal with an impact factor and a readership in around 135 countries. It has been published since 1953, when it replaced an earlier ICN publication. The journal's Editor in Chief is Prof. Parveen Ali, who is supported by Associate Editors, Dr. Mona Gamal Mohamed, Prof. Dr. Filip Haegdorens, Prof. John Unsworth, Dr. Brigitte Woo and Ahtisham Younas. INR is a major voice of ICN, and a peer-reviewed journal that focuses predominantly on nursing policy and health policy issues of relevance to nursing. It is published online in English, and also translated into Spanish and Chinese. INR was admitted in to the prestigious Nursing Journal Hall of Fame in 2016 by the International Academy of Nurse Editors (INANE).

== Presidents of ICN ==
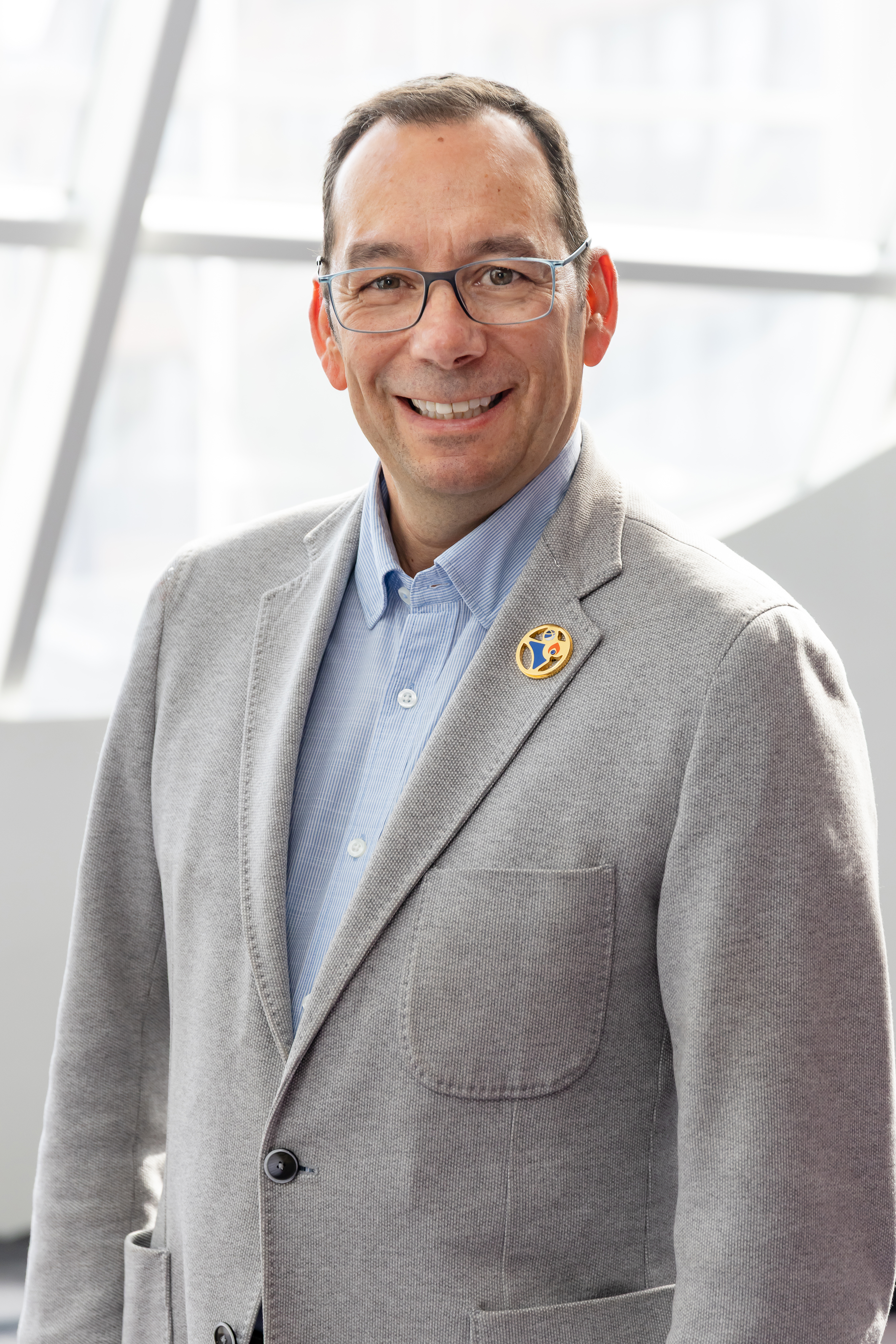
Jose Luis Cobos Serrano

Country represented in brackets.

- 1899 - 1904 Ethel Bedford Fenwick (UK)
- 1904 - 1909 Susan McGahey (Australia)
- 1909 - 1912 Agnes Karll (Germany)
- 1912 - 1915 Annie Warburton Goodrich (USA)
- 1915 - 1922 Henny Tscherning (Denmark)
- 1922 - 1925 Sophie Mannerheim (Finland)
- 1925 - 1929 Nina Gage (China)
- 1929 - 1933 Leonie Chaptal (France)
- 1933 - 1937 Alicia Still (UK)
- 1937 - 1947 Effie J. Taylor (USA)
- 1947 - 1953 Gerda Höjer (Sweden)
- 1953 - 1957 Marie Bihet (Belgium)
- 1957 - 1961 Agnes Ohlson (USA)
- 1961 - 1965 Alice Clamageran (France)
- 1965 - 1969 Alice Girard (Canada)
- 1969 - 1973 Margarethe Kruse (Denmark)
- 1973 - 1977 Dorothy Cornelius (USA)
- 1977 - 1981 Olive Anstey (Australia)
- 1981 - 1985 Eunice Muringo Kiereini (Kenya)
- 1985 - 1989 Nelly Garzón Alarcón (Colombia)
- 1989 - 1993 Mo-Im Kim (South Korea)
- 1993 - 1997 Margretta Styles (USA)
- 1997 - 2001 Kirsten Stallknecht (Denmark)
- 2001 - 2005 Christine Hancock (UK)
- 2005 - 2009 Hiroko Minami (Japan)
- 2009 - 2013 Rosemary Bryant (Australia)
- 2013 - 2017 Judith Shamian (Canada)
- 2017 - 2021 Annette Kennedy (Ireland)
- 2021 - 2025 Pamela Cipriano (USA)
- 2025 - 2029 Jose Luis Cobos Serrano (Spain)

== See also ==
- List of nursing organizations
