= C-3 visa =

The C-3 visa is a non-immigrant visa which allows governmental officials and their families, attendants, servants and employees to travel to United States for the purpose of transiting through the country. The maximum duration of stay is 29 days.

To qualify, the applicant must possess the ticket necessary to reach their destination and the funds necessary to complete transit. Since there is no dependent visa class, each member of a group must apply separately for a C-3 visa. Individuals who are younger than 13 or older than 80 are usually not required to attend an interview with US consular officers, although this may be required at their discretion.
