= 3C (trade association) =

Small business advocacy organization

3C, also styled the Connected Commerce Council, is a Washington, DC–based small business advocacy organization. It receives significant funding from large tech firms such as Google and Amazon.

== History ==
3C was founded in 2018 by Jake Ward to “promote small businesses’ success through the adoption of essential digital technologies and tools.” Prior to starting 3C, Ward was the co-founder and CEO of Application Developers Alliance, an advocacy organization for software developers. Ward also serves as the CEO of Data Protocol, a developer education platform. 3C raised about $1.6 million in 2018. In addition to current support from Google and Amazon, 3C has also received funding from Facebook, now known as Meta. 3C has purchased large numbers of ads on Facebook for several years.

According to its website, 3C’s mission is to “[advance] the interests, education and engagement of small businesses powered by digital technology.” 3C provides training services, connects members with resources, and advocates on behalf of its members and the small business community at large on the state, federal, and international level. As of December 2021, 3C represents 15,000 small businesses in the U.S. and Europe. 3C does not charge its members for services or information.

3C has received criticism from the Campaign for Accountability, which called the organization a “front group for the nation’s largest technology companies.” 3C's technology partners include Amazon and Google.

== Research ==
3C has released several studies in partnership with Google and other partners, including:

- The Digitally Empowered report, which found that about 70% of small businesses found digital tools useful during the COVID-19 pandemic, with 31% of participants saying they would have to reduce their operations or shut down entirely without access to online services for businesses;
- The Digitally Driven report, which found that businesses that adopted online tools aggressively at the start of the pandemic would earn four times as much revenue as businesses that did not adopt digital tools. In 2021, 3C released a follow-up report to Digitally Driven entitled Digitally Driven: 2021, which identified a “growing gap between small businesses who are embracing and adopting digital tools at a high rate and those who remain uncertain and less digitally advanced.” 3C has leveraged these studies in the organization's broader advocacy work, including letter-writing campaigns to state governors advocating for preserved access to digital tools;
- The Digital Safety Net report, which estimated that small businesses gain $145 billion in revenue from online marketplaces.

== Advocacy ==
3C works on various policy issues, including privacy, trade, data and advertising restrictions, competition, and digital security.

In May 2020, 3C and 80 Kentucky small business owners presented Governor Andy Beshear and other state policymakers with a letter calling to preserve access to essential digital tools. The letter cited excessive regulation of digital platforms as a threat to small businesses.

In June 2020, 3C published another letter to Colorado Governor Jared Polis, signed by 150 Colorado small business owners, stressing the importance of protecting access to digital tools. 3C has organized similar efforts to the governors of Nevada, New York, North Carolina, Pennsylvania, Texas, and Utah.

In 2021, 3C spoke out against S. 2992, H.R. 3816, and H.R. 3825, stating that antitrust legislation against tech companies would result in “collateral damage” in the way of affordable digital tools utilized by small businesses.

== COVID-19 ==
In response to the COVID-19 pandemic, 3C provided free training and educational resources to small businesses. 3C also launched a series of policy seminars and a funding tool to help small businesses locate funds such as PPP loans at the local, state, and federal level.

== Education ==
3C partners with various organizations to provide training to members and the small business community at large. Ongoing educational offerings include training with tech partners, including the “Grow with Google series,” and 3C University, 3C's proprietary online training platform for small businesses.
