= List of radio stations in the United Kingdom =

This is a list of radio stations in the United Kingdom, the Isle of Man and the Channel Islands.

For stations on small-scale digital multiplexes, these are maintained at List of DAB multiplexes in the United Kingdom.

== National analogue and digital stations ==
This list does not include stations which broadcast on numerous local digital multiplexes to achieve near-national coverage.

DAB frequencies:

- 11A – radio stations operated under the Sound Digital multiplex
- 11D / 12A – radio stations operated under the Digital One multiplex (12A in Scotland and 11D in England, Wales and Northern Ireland)
- 12B – radio stations operated under the BBC National DAB multiplex

=== DAB ===
Name	Format	Owner or parent company	FM	AM	DAB	Freeview	Freesat	Sky	Virgin
BBC Radio 1	New and contemporary hit music	BBC	97.1, 97.7–99.8		12B	700	700	0101	901
BBC Radio 1Xtra	Black contemporary music	BBC			12B	701	701	0124	907
BBC Radio 2	Classic and adult contemporary music	BBC	88.1–90.2		12B	702	702	0102	902
BBC Radio 3	Classical music, drama and culture	BBC	90.3–92.4, 92.6		12B	703	703	0103	903
BBC Radio 4	Spoken-word programming, including news and documentaries	BBC	92.5–96.1, 103.5–104.9		12B	704	704	0104	904
BBC Radio 4 Extra	Archival programming, including comedy and drama	BBC			12B	708	708	0123	910
BBC Radio 5 Live	Live news, sport and discussion	BBC		693; 909; 990	12B	705	705	0105	905
BBC Radio 5 Sports Extra	Extended live coverage of sporting fixtures	BBC			12B	706	706	0127	908
BBC Radio 6 Music	Alternative music	BBC			12B	707	707	0118	909
BBC Asian Network	Music and news for British Asian community	BBC		1458 (Birmingham); 828 (Wolverhampton); 837 (Leicestershire); 1449 (Peterborough)	12B	709	709	0117	912
BBC World Service	International news and features	BBC			12B	710	711	0113	906
Fix Radio	Music and programming for tradespeople	Fix Radio Ltd			11A				
LBC	News, talk and phone-ins	Global	97.3 (Greater London)		11D / 12A; Also on local DAB+: 12A (Channel Islands)	732	734	0121	919
Premier Christian Radio	Christian religious station	Premier Christian Media Trust		1305 (North and South London); 1413 (East and West London); 1566 (Guildford)	11A	725			
Premier Praise	Christian religious station	Premier Christian Media Trust			11A				
Talksport	Sport and phone-ins	News Broadcasting		1053; 1071; 1089; 1107	11D / 12A; Also on local DAB / DAB+: 11C (Aberdeen and Aberdeenshire); 11D (Central Scotland); 12A (Channel Islands – DAB+)	723	731	0107	927
Times Radio	News and current affairs	News Broadcasting			11A; Also on local DAB / DAB+: 11C (Aberdeen and Aberdeenshire); 12A (Channel Islands – DAB+)			0142	
Virgin Radio UK	Adult-orientated pop / rock music	News Broadcasting			11A; Also on local DAB / DAB+: 11C (Aberdeen and Aberdeenshire); 12A (Channel Islands – DAB+)		736	0137	

=== DAB+ ===
Name	Format	Owner or parent company	FM	AM	DAB+	Freeview	Freesat	Sky	Virgin
Absolute Radio	Rock music	Bauer Media Group			11D / 12A; Also on local DAB+: 12C (Greater London)				
Absolute Radio 80s	1980s rock / pop music	Bauer Media Group			11A; Also on local DAB+: 11B (Cumbria and Inverness); 12D (Northern Ireland)				
Absolute Radio 90s	1990s rock / pop music	Bauer Media Group			11A; Also on local DAB+: 11B (Cumbria and Inverness)				
Absolute Classic Rock	Classic rock music	Bauer Media Group			11A; Also on local DAB+: 11B (Cumbria and Inverness); 12D (Northern Ireland)				
Absolute Radio Country	Country music	Bauer Media Group			11A; Also on local DAB+: 11B (Cumbria and Inverness)				
BBC Radio 1 Anthems	Classic hit music from 2000s to present	BBC			12B				
BBC Radio 1 Dance	Electronic dance music	BBC			12B				
BBC Radio 3 Unwind	Relaxing classical music	BBC			12B				
BFBS UK	Music station for UK Forces	British Forces Broadcasting Service			11A		786	0136	
Boom Radio	Music station for over 55s	Boom Radio Ltd			11A; Also on local DAB+: 12A (Channel Islands); Also on small-scale DAB+				
Capital Anthems	Classic pop hits	Global			11A				
Capital Dance	Current dance music	Global			11D / 12A				
Capital UK	Contemporary hit music	Global	See England, Scotland and Wales lists for local FM network		11D / 12A; Capital UK's network feed also on local DAB / DAB+: 12A (Lincolnshire); 12A (Channel Islands – DAB+); See England, Scotland and Wales lists for local DAB network	724	719	0108	958
Capital Xtra	Hip-hop and R&B	Global	96.9 (South London); 107.1 (North London)		11D / 12A		720	0112	959
Capital Xtra Reloaded	Classic hip-hop and R&B	Global			11A				
Classic FM	Classical music	Global	99.9–101.1, 101.3–101.9		11D / 12A; Also on local DAB+: 12A (Channel Islands)	731	721	0106	922
GB News Radio (Audio relay of GB News television channel)	News channel	All Perspectives Ltd.			11D / 12A; Also on local DAB+: 12A (Channel Islands)				
Gold Radio	Oldies	Global			11D / 12A; Also on local DAB+: 12A (Channel Islands); 12C (Greater London)		722	0119	923
Greatest Hits Radio 60s	1960s music	Bauer Media Group			11A; Also on local DAB+: 11B (Cumbria and Inverness)				
Greatest Hits Radio 70s	1970s music	Bauer Media Group			11D / 12A				
Greatest Hits Radio 80s	1980s music	Bauer Media Group			11D / 12A				
Heart 70s	1970s music	Global			11D / 12A				
Heart 80s	1980s music	Global			11D / 12A			0110	921
Heart 90s	1990s music	Global			11D / 12A			0138	
Heart 00s	2000s music	Global			11D / 12A				
Heart Dance	Classic dance music	Global			11D / 12A			0128	
Heart UK	Hot adult contemporary	Global	See England, Scotland and Wales lists for local FM network		11D / 12A; Heart UK's network feed also on local DAB / DAB+: 12A (Lincolnshire); 12A (Channel Islands – DAB+); See England, Scotland and Wales lists for local DAB network	728	733	0109	918
Heart Xmas (on-air until late December)	Christmas music	Global			11D / 12A				
Hits Radio 90s	1990s music	Bauer Media Group			11D / 12A				
Hits Radio 00s	2000s music	Bauer Media Group			11D / 12A				
Hits Radio Chilled	Soft adult contemporary	Bauer Media Group			11A; Also on local DAB+: 11B (Cumbria and Inverness)				
Jazz FM	Jazz and soul music	Bauer Media Group			11A; Also on local DAB+: 11B (Cumbria and Inverness)				
Kerrang! Radio	Modern rock music	Bauer Media Group			11A; Also on local DAB+: 11B (Cumbria and Inverness); 12D (Northern Ireland)				
Kiss	Pop hits with partial specialist programming	Bauer Media Group			11D / 12A; Also on local DAB+: 12C (Greater London)				
Kisstory	"Old skool" dance and hip-hop	Bauer Media Group			11D / 12A				
Kisstory R&B	Classic R&B music	Bauer Media Group			11A; Also on local DAB+: 11B (Cumbria and Inverness)				
LBC News	Rolling news	Global			11D / 12A; Also on local DAB+: 11B (Greater London)			0141	
Magic Christmas (on-air until late December)	Christmas music	Bauer Media Group			11D / 12A				
Magic Classical	Classical music	Bauer Media Group			11A; Also on local DAB+: 11B (Cumbria and Inverness)				
Magic Musicals	Songs from musical theatre	Bauer Media Group			11A; Also on local DAB+: 11B (Cumbria and Inverness)				
Magic Radio	Adult contemporary	Bauer Media Group	105.4 (Greater London); 106.5 (Bristol)		11D / 12A; Also on local DAB+: 12C (Greater London)				
Magic Soul	Classic soul	Bauer Media Group			11A; Also on local DAB+: 11B (Cumbria and Inverness)				
Mellow Magic	Mellow and calm music	Bauer Media Group			11A; Also on local DAB+: 11B (Cumbria and Inverness)				
Planet Rock	Classic and heavy rock	Bauer Media Group			11A; Also on local DAB / DAB+: 10C (Flintshire, Merseyside and West Cheshire); 10D (Humberside); 11B (Bradford, Dundee, Halifax, Huddersfield, Perth and Teesside); 11B (Cumbria and Inverness – DAB+); 11C (Glasgow, Northumberland, South Yorkshire and Tyne and Wear); 12A (Carmarthenshire, Lancashire, Neath Port Talbot and Swansea); 12D (Fife, Leeds, Lothian and Stoke-on-Trent); 12D (Northern Ireland – DAB+)				
Smooth 80s	1980s adult contemporary	Global			11A				
Smooth Chill	Chill-out music	Global			11D / 12A				
Smooth Relax	Soft pop	Global			11D / 12A				
Smooth UK	Soft adult contemporary	Global	See England and Scotland lists for local FM network		11D / 12A; Smooth UK's network feed also on local DAB / DAB+: 10C (North Yorkshire); 11C (South Yorkshire); 12A (Lincolnshire); 12A (Channel Islands – DAB+); 12D (Leeds); See England, Scotland and Wales lists for local DAB network	718	732	0122	916
Sunrise Radio	Asian music and speech	Sunrise Radio London Ltd		963 (East London); 972 (West London)	11A				
Talk	Talk and phone-ins	News Broadcasting			11A				
Talksport 2	Sports programming and commentaries	News Broadcasting			11A; Also on local DAB: 11C (Aberdeen and Aberdeenshire)				
UCB 1	Christian religious station	United Christian Broadcasters			11D / 12A; Also on local DAB+: 12A (Channel Islands)				
UCB 2	Christian religious station	United Christian Broadcasters			11D / 12A; Also on local DAB+: 12A (Channel Islands)				
Virgin Radio Chilled	Soft adult contemporary and acoustic music	News Broadcasting			11A				
Virgin Radio Legends	Guitar-based classics	News Broadcasting			11A				
Radio X	Modern rock music	Global	104.9 (Greater London); 97.7 (Greater Manchester)		11D / 12A; Also on local DAB+: 12A (Channel Islands)		723	0111	960
Radio X Classic Rock	Classic rock music	Global			11A				

== Semi-national digital stations ==
Stations which are available nationally on satellite, or broadcast on more than one local digital multiplex to achieve near-national coverage:

Name	Format	DAB	DAB+	AM	Sky
Absolute Radio 70s	1970s rock / pop music		11B (Bradford, Halifax and Huddersfield); 12A (Carmarthenshire, Neath Port Talbot and Swansea); 12D (Stoke-on-Trent)		
Absolute Radio 00s	2000s rock / pop music	12A (Lancashire)	10B (Derbyshire, Norfolk, Oxfordshire, Somerset and Sussex); 10C (Flintshire, Gloucestershire, Merseyside, Northamptonshire, North Devon, North Yorkshire, Suffolk, Surrey and West Cheshire); 10D (Bath, Bedfordshire, Buckinghamshire, Hertfordshire, Humberside and West Wiltshire); 11B (Bath, Black Country, Bradford, Bristol, Cornwall, Cumbria, Dorset, Dundee, Halifax, Huddersfield, Inverness, Leicestershire, Perth, Shropshire and Teesside); 11C (Aberdeen, Aberdeenshire, Birmingham, Cambridgeshire, East Devon, Exeter, Glasgow, Kent, Northumberland, South Hampshire, South Yorkshire, Swindon, Torbay and Tyne and Wear); 12A (Carmarthenshire, Herefordshire, Lincolnshire, Neath Port Talbot, Swansea and Worcestershire); 12C (Greater London, Greater Manchester, Nottinghamshire and South East Wales); 12D (Berkshire, Coventry, Essex, Fife, Leeds, Lothian, Northern Ireland, North Hampshire, Peterborough, Plymouth, Stoke-on-Trent and Warwickshire)		
Absolute Radio 10s	2010s rock / pop music	12A (Lancashire)	10C (Flintshire, Gloucestershire, Merseyside and West Cheshire); 10D (Humberside); 11B (Bradford, Cumbria, Dundee, Halifax, Huddersfield, Inverness, Perth and Teesside); 11C (Birmingham, Glasgow, Northumberland, South Yorkshire and Tyne and Wear); 12A (Carmarthenshire, Neath Port Talbot and Swansea); 12C (Greater London and Greater Manchester); 12D (Fife, Leeds, Lothian, Northern Ireland and Stoke-on-Trent)		
Centreforce	Dance music		12A (Greater London); 10D (North East Wales and West Cheshire); Also on small-scale DAB+		
Classic FM Calm	Soft classical music		10B (Derbyshire, Norfolk, Oxfordshire and Sussex); 10C (Northamptonshire and North Devon); 10D (Bath, Bedfordshire, Buckinghamshire, Hertfordshire, Humberside and West Wiltshire); 11B (Bath, Bristol, Cornwall, Dorset, Greater London and Leicestershire); 11C (Birmingham, Cambridgeshire, East Devon, Exeter, Kent, South Hampshire, Swindon and Torbay); 12C (Greater Manchester, Nottinghamshire and South East Wales); 12D (Berkshire, Coventry, Essex, North Hampshire, Peterborough, Plymouth and Warwickshire)		
Fun Kids	Children's		10B (Somerset); 10C (Gloucestershire, North Yorkshire, South London, Suffolk and Surrey); 10D (North East Wales and West Cheshire); 11B (Morecambe Bay); 12A (Herefordshire, Lincolnshire and Worcestershire); Also on small-scale DAB+		
Fun Kids Junior	Children's		10C (South London and Surrey); 10D (North East Wales and West Cheshire)		
Heat Radio	Hot adult contemporary	12A (Lancashire)	10C (Flintshire, Merseyside and West Cheshire); 10D (Humberside); 11B (Bradford, Cumbria, Dundee, Halifax, Huddersfield, Perth and Teesside); 11C (Birmingham, Glasgow, Northumberland, South Yorkshire and Tyne and Wear); 12A (Carmarthenshire, Neath Port Talbot and Swansea); 12C (Greater London and Greater Manchester); 12D (Fife, Leeds, Lothian and Stoke-on-Trent)		
Hits Radio Pride	Hit music aimed at LGBTQ+ people	12A (Lancashire)	10B (Derbyshire, Norfolk, Oxfordshire, Somerset and Sussex); 10C (Flintshire, Gloucestershire, Merseyside, Northamptonshire, North Devon, North Yorkshire, Suffolk, Surrey and West Cheshire); 10D (Bath, Bedfordshire, Buckinghamshire, Hertfordshire, Humberside and West Wiltshire); 11B (Bath, Black Country, Bradford, Bristol, Cornwall, Cumbria, Dorset, Dundee, Halifax, Huddersfield, Inverness, Leicestershire, Perth, Shropshire and Teesside); 11C (Birmingham, Cambridgeshire, East Devon, Exeter, Glasgow, Kent, Northumberland, South Hampshire, South Yorkshire, Swindon, Torbay and Tyne and Wear); 12A (Carmarthenshire, Herefordshire, Lincolnshire, Neath Port Talbot, Swansea and Worcestershire); 12C (Greater London, Greater Manchester, Nottinghamshire and South East Wales); 12D (Berkshire, Coventry, Essex, Fife, Leeds, Lothian, Northern Ireland, North Hampshire, Peterborough, Plymouth, Stoke-on-Trent and Warwickshire)		
Kiss Dance	Dance music	12A (Lancashire)	10B (Derbyshire, Norfolk, Oxfordshire, Somerset and Sussex); 10C (Flintshire, Gloucestershire, Merseyside, Northamptonshire, North Devon, North Yorkshire, Suffolk, Surrey and West Cheshire); 10D (Bath, Bedfordshire, Buckinghamshire, Hertfordshire, Humberside and West Wiltshire); 11B (Ayrshire, Bath, Black Country, Bradford, Bristol, Cornwall, Cumbria, Dorset, Dundee, Halifax, Huddersfield, Inverness, Leicestershire, Perth, Shropshire and Teesside); 11C (Aberdeen, Aberdeenshire, Birmingham, Cambridgeshire, East Devon, Exeter, Glasgow, Kent, Northumberland, South Hampshire, South Yorkshire, Swindon, Torbay and Tyne and Wear); 12A (Carmarthenshire, Herefordshire, Lincolnshire, Neath Port Talbot, Swansea and Worcestershire); 12C (Greater London, Greater Manchester, Nottinghamshire and South East Wales); 12D (Berkshire, Coventry, Essex, Fife, Leeds, Lothian, Northern Ireland, North Hampshire, Peterborough, Plymouth, Stoke-on-Trent and Warwickshire)		
Kiss Xtra	Hip-hop and R&B	12A (Lancashire)	10B (Derbyshire, Norfolk, Oxfordshire, Somerset and Sussex); 10C (Flintshire, Merseyside, Northamptonshire, North Devon, North Yorkshire, Suffolk, Surrey and West Cheshire); 10D (Bath, Bedfordshire, Buckinghamshire, Hertfordshire, Humberside and West Wiltshire); 11B (Bath, Black Country, Bradford, Bristol, Cornwall, Cumbria, Dorset, Dundee, Halifax, Huddersfield, Inverness, Leicestershire, Perth, Shropshire and Teesside); 11C (Birmingham, Cambridgeshire, East Devon, Exeter, Glasgow, Kent, Northumberland, South Hampshire, South Yorkshire, Swindon, Torbay and Tyne and Wear); 12A (Carmarthenshire, Herefordshire, Lincolnshire, Neath Port Talbot, Swansea and Worcestershire); 12C (Greater London, Greater Manchester, Nottinghamshire and South East Wales); 12D (Berkshire, Coventry, Essex, Fife, Leeds, Lothian, Northern Ireland, North Hampshire, Peterborough, Plymouth, Stoke-on-Trent and Warwickshire)		
Radio Maria UK	Catholic religious station	Small-scale DAB	11C (Aberdeen and Aberdeenshire); 11D (Central Scotland); 12A (Greater London); Also on small-scale DAB+		
Nation 60s	1960s music		12A (Greater London); 12D (Mid and West Wales); Also on small-scale DAB+		
Nation 70s	1970s music		10C (Suffolk); 10D / 12D (North West Wales); 12A (Greater London); 12C (South East Wales); 12D (Mid and West Wales); Also on small-scale DAB+		
Nation 80s	1980s music		10B (Derbyshire, Norfolk, Oxfordshire and Sussex); 10C (Northamptonshire, North Devon and Suffolk); 10D (Bath, Bedfordshire, Buckinghamshire, Hertfordshire, North East Wales, West Cheshire and West Wiltshire); 10D / 12D (North West Wales); 11B (Ayrshire, Bath, Black Country, Bristol, Cornwall, Dorset, Morecambe Bay and Shropshire); 11C (Cambridgeshire, East Devon, Exeter, Kent, South Hampshire, Swindon and Torbay); 11D (Central Scotland); 12A (Greater London); 12C (Nottinghamshire and South East Wales); 12D (Berkshire, Coventry, Essex, Mid and West Wales, North Hampshire, Peterborough, Plymouth and Warwickshire); Also on small-scale DAB+		
Nation 90s	1990s music		10B (Derbyshire); 10C (North Devon and Suffolk); 10D (Bath, Bedfordshire, Buckinghamshire, Hertfordshire, North East Wales, West Cheshire and West Wiltshire); 10D / 12D (North West Wales); 11B (Bath, Black Country, Bristol, Cornwall, Dorset, Morecambe Bay and Shropshire); 11C (East Devon, Exeter, Kent, South Hampshire, Swindon and Torbay); 12A (Greater London); 12C (Nottinghamshire and South East Wales); 12D (Berkshire, Coventry, Essex, Mid and West Wales, North Hampshire, Plymouth and Warwickshire); Also on small-scale DAB+		
Panjab Radio	Punjabi programming	10B (Derbyshire); 11B (Black Country and Shropshire); 12D (Coventry and Warwickshire)	11B (Greater London); Also on small-scale DAB+	558 (Greater London)	0125
Smooth Country	Country music		10B (Derbyshire, Norfolk, Oxfordshire and Sussex); 10C (Northamptonshire and North Devon); 10D (Bath, Bedfordshire, Buckinghamshire, Hertfordshire, Humberside and West Wiltshire); 11B (Bath, Bristol, Cornwall, Dorset and Leicestershire); 11C (Birmingham, Cambridgeshire, East Devon, Exeter, Kent, South Hampshire, Swindon and Torbay); 12C (Greater London, Greater Manchester, Nottinghamshire and South East Wales); 12D (Berkshire, Coventry, Essex, North Hampshire, Peterborough, Plymouth and Warwickshire)		
Virgin Radio 80s	1980s music		11B (Ayrshire); 11D (Central Scotland); 12A (Greater London)		
Virgin Radio 90s	1990s music		11B (Ayrshire); 11D (Central Scotland); 12A (Greater London)		

== Local and regional analogue and digital stations ==
=== BBC Local Radio ===
Local radio stations from the BBC in England and the Channel Islands:

Name	Licence area	FM	AM	DAB	DAB+	Freeview (regional)	Notes
BBC Radio Berkshire	Berkshire, North Hampshire and South Oxfordshire	104.4 (Reading and Wokingham); 104.1 (West Berkshire and North Hampshire); 95.4 (Windsor); 94.6 (Henley-on-Thames and Marlow)		12D		711	
BBC Radio Bristol	Bristol, Bath, North Somerset and South Gloucestershire	94.9 (Bristol and South Gloucestershire); 103.6 (Weston-super-Mare and North Somerset); 104.6 (Bath)		11B		711	
BBC Radio Cambridgeshire	Cambridgeshire	96.0 (Cambridge, East and South Cambridgeshire); 95.7 (Fenland District, Huntingdonshire and Peterborough)		11C (Cambridgeshire); 12D (Peterborough)		714	
BBC Radio Cornwall	Cornwall and the Isles of Scilly	95.2 (East Cornwall); 96.0 (Isles of Scilly); 103.9 (West Cornwall)		11B		713	
BBC Radio Cumbria	Cumbria and Morecambe Bay	95.6 (North Cumbria); 95.2 (Kendal); 96.1 (Morecambe Bay); 104.1 (Keswick and Whitehaven); 104.2 (Windermere)	756 (North Cumbria); 837 (South Cumbria)		11B	713	
BBC CWR	Coventry and Warwickshire	94.8 (Coventry, Borough of Rugby and North Warwickshire); 103.7 (Stratford-on-Avon District and Warwick District); 104.0 (Nuneaton)		12D		711	
BBC Radio Derby	Derbyshire, East Staffordshire and Lichfield District	104.5 (Derby, South Derbyshire, East Staffordshire and Lichfield District); 95.3 (Bakewell and Matlock); 96.0 (Buxton)	1116	10B		717	
BBC Radio Devon	Devon and East Cornwall	95.7 (Plymouth); 94.8 (North Devon); 95.8 (Exeter); 96.0 (Okehampton); 103.4 (Dartmoor and East Cornwall); 104.3 (Torbay)		12D (Plymouth); 10C (North Devon); 11C (East Devon, Exeter and Torbay)		712	
BBC Essex	Essex	103.5 (City of Chelmsford, Borough of Brentwood, Braintree District, City of Colchester, Maldon District, Tendring District and Uttlesford); 95.3 (Borough of Basildon, Borough of Castle Point, Rochford District, Southend-on-Sea and Thurrock)		12D		716	
BBC Radio Gloucestershire	Gloucestershire	104.7 (Gloucester, Borough of Tewkesbury, Cheltenham and Newent); 95.0 (Stroud); 95.8 (Cirencester)	1413	10C		716	
BBC Radio Guernsey	Bailiwick of Guernsey	93.2 (Guernsey and Sark); 99.0 (Alderney)			12A	713	BBC Radio Guernsey Xtra on DAB+ used as a broadcast opt-out for live coverage of the States of Guernsey
BBC Hereford & Worcester	Herefordshire and Worcestershire	94.7 (Herefordshire); 104.0 (Worcestershire); 104.4 (Redditch and Hopwood); 104.6 (Kidderminster)		12A		712	
BBC Radio Humberside	East Riding of Yorkshire and North Lincolnshire	95.9		10D		713	
BBC Radio Jersey	Jersey	88.8			12A	711	BBC Radio Jersey Xtra on DAB+ used as a broadcast opt-out for live coverage of the States of Jersey
BBC Radio Kent	Kent and Southend-on-Sea	96.7 (North, West Kent and Southend-on-Sea); 97.6 (Folkestone); 104.2 (East Kent)		11C		711	
BBC Radio Lancashire	Lancashire	95.5 (East and Central Lancashire); 103.9 (South, West and Central Lancashire); 104.5 (North Lancashire)		12A		712	
BBC Radio Leeds	West Yorkshire	92.4; 95.3 (West Halifax, Otley and Ilkley); 102.7 (Keighley); 103.9 (Leeds)		12D (Leeds); 11B (Bradford, Halifax and Huddersfield)		711	
BBC Radio Leicester	Leicestershire and Rutland	104.9		11B		713	
BBC Radio Lincolnshire	Lincolnshire	94.9; 104.7 (Grantham)		12A		714	
BBC Radio London	Greater London, Luton and South West Essex	94.9		12A		713	Also on Sky 0129 (London only), Freesat 718 and Virgin 937
BBC Radio Manchester	Greater Manchester and North Cheshire	95.1; 104.6 (Saddleworth and Tameside)		12C		711	
BBC Radio Merseyside	Merseyside, West Cheshire, West Lancashire and Flintshire	95.8		10C		714	
BBC Radio Newcastle	Tyne and Wear, Northumberland and Durham	95.4 (Tyne and Wear, Durham and South Northumberland); 96.0 (North Northumberland); 103.7 (Tyne Valley); 104.4 (Newcastle upon Tyne and Gateshead)		11C		711	
BBC Radio Norfolk	Norfolk	95.1 (East Norfolk); 95.6 (North Norfolk); 104.4 (West Norfolk)	873 (West Norfolk)	10B	Small-scale DAB+	711	
BBC Radio Northampton	Northamptonshire	104.2 (West Northamptonshire); 103.6 (North Northamptonshire)		10C		716	
BBC Radio Nottingham	Nottinghamshire	103.8 (South Nottinghamshire); 95.5 (Central Nottinghamshire); 95.1 (Newark-on-Trent)		12C		712	
BBC Radio Oxford	Oxfordshire	95.2		10B		714	
BBC Radio Sheffield	South Yorkshire, North Derbyshire and North Nottinghamshire	104.1 (South Yorkshire and North Nottinghamshire); 88.6 (Sheffield); 94.7 (Chesterfield)		11C		716	
BBC Radio Shropshire	Shropshire and the Black Country	96.0 (Shropshire); 90.0 (Church Stretton); 95.0 (Ludlow); 104.1 (Clun)		11B		713	
BBC Radio Solent	Hampshire, East Dorset and the Isle of Wight	96.1		11C (South Hampshire and the Isle of Wight)		714	
BBC Radio Solent (Dorset)	Dorset	103.8 (Dorchester and Weymouth)		11B		715	Opt-out Dorset breakfast programme broadcast every weekday from 0700-0900
BBC Radio Somerset	Somerset	95.5	1566	10B		714	
BBC Radio Stoke	North Staffordshire and South Cheshire	94.6 (Stoke-on-Trent, North Staffordshire and South Cheshire); 104.1 (Stafford)		12D		715	
BBC Radio Suffolk	Suffolk	95.5 (Lowestoft); 95.9 (East Suffolk); 103.9 (South Suffolk); 104.6 (West Suffolk)		10C		712	
BBC Radio Surrey	Surrey, North East Hampshire and North Sussex	104.0 (Reigate, Redhill and Crawley); 104.6 (Guildford)		10C		714	
BBC Radio Sussex	Sussex	95.0 (Newhaven, Peacehaven and Seaford); 95.1 (Horsham); 95.3 (Brighton and Hove, Shoreham-by-Sea and Worthing); 104.5 (East Sussex and Haywards Heath); 104.8 (West Sussex)		10B		712	
BBC Radio Tees	Tees Valley, County Durham and North Yorkshire	95.0; 95.8 (Whitby)		11B		714	
BBC Three Counties Radio	Bedfordshire, Buckinghamshire and Hertfordshire	90.4 (East Hertfordshire); 92.1 (South Hertfordshire); 94.7 (Aylesbury); 95.5 (Bedfordshire and North Hertfordshire); 98.0 (High Wycombe); 103.8 (East Buckinghamshire, South Bedfordshire and West Hertfordshire); 104.5 (City of Milton Keynes)		10D		712	
BBC Radio Wiltshire	Wiltshire	103.5 (South Wiltshire); 103.6 (Swindon); 104.3 (West Wiltshire); 104.9 (Marlborough)		11C (Swindon); 10D (West Wiltshire and Bath)	Small-scale DAB+	713	
BBC Radio WM	West Midlands	95.6		11C (Birmingham); 11B (Black Country and Shropshire)		714	
BBC Radio York	North Yorkshire	103.7 (York, Malton and Pocklington); 95.5 (Scarborough and Filey); 104.3 (Thirsk, Northallerton and Ripon)		10C		712	

=== BBC Nations Radio ===
BBC radio stations from Scotland, Wales and Northern Ireland, broadcast in their respective areas via analogue and digital radio, Freeview and across the UK on satellite and cable television and BBC Sounds:

Name	Licence area	FM	AM	DAB	DAB+	Freesat	Sky	Virgin	Freeview (regional)	Notes
BBC Radio Scotland	Scotland and North Cumbria	92.5–94.3, 94.5–94.7	810	11C (Glasgow, Aberdeen and Aberdeenshire); 11B (Ayrshire, Dundee, Inverness and Perth); 12D (Lothian and Fife)		712	0114	930	711	Regional news bulletins broadcast every weekday at 0630, 0730, 0830, 1230, 1630 and 1730 in the following areas: Dumfries and Galloway; Highlands and Islands; North East Scotland; Scottish Borders
BBC Radio Shetland	Shetland Islands	92.7								Opt-out service from BBC Radio Scotland, which broadcasts local programming every weekday from 1730-1800 and every Friday from 1800-1900
BBC Radio Orkney	Orkney Islands	93.7								Opt-out service from BBC Radio Scotland, which broadcasts local programming every weekday from 0730-0800 and every Friday from 1800-1900
BBC Radio nan Gàidheal	Scotland	103.5–103.7, 103.9–104.7, 104.9		11B (Inverness, Ayrshire, Dundee and Perth); 11C (Aberdeen and Aberdeenshire); 11D (Central Scotland)		713	0126	934	712	Programming in Scottish Gaelic Over 90 hours a week of programming in Scots Gaelic with programming from BBC Radio Scotland relayed at other times
BBC Radio Wales	Wales and West Cheshire	90.2–92.3, 93.9, 94.6–96.1, 103.9	882 (South Wales)	12C (South East Wales); 10D (North East Wales and West Cheshire); 10D / 12D (North West Wales); 12A (Carmarthenshire, Neath Port Talbot and Swansea); 12D (Mid and West Wales)	Small-scale DAB+	714	0115	931	711	
BBC Radio Cymru	Wales, Cheshire and Merseyside	92.4–95.0, 95.7, 96.1, 96.8, 103.5–104.9		12C (South East Wales); 10D (North East Wales and West Cheshire); 10D / 12D (North West Wales); 12A (Carmarthenshire, Neath Port Talbot and Swansea); 12D (Mid and West Wales)	Small-scale DAB+	715	0129 (Wales); 0130 (Rest of UK)	936	712	Programming in Welsh
BBC Radio Cymru 2	Wales and West Cheshire			12C (South East Wales); 10D (North East Wales and West Cheshire); 10D / 12D (North West Wales); 12A (Carmarthenshire, Neath Port Talbot and Swansea); 12D (Mid and West Wales)	Small-scale DAB+	718 (Wales); 735 (Rest of UK)	0130 (Wales); 0139 (Rest of UK)	913	713	Programming in Welsh Opt-out service from BBC Radio Cymru with up to 60 hours per week of music-based programming
BBC Radio Ulster	Northern Ireland	92.7–95.4		12D		716	0116	932	711	Around 5 hours of programming per week in Irish and Ulster Scots
BBC Radio Foyle	Derry	93.1		12D		717	0129 (NI); 0140 (Rest of UK)	933	712	Opt-out service from BBC Radio Ulster with 25 hours per week of local programming including on weekdays from 0800-0900 and from 1300-1600

=== Commercial radio ===
==== England ====
England's radio stations adhere to the statistical regions of East Midlands, East, Greater London, North East, North West, South East, South West, West Midlands and Yorkshire and the Humber.

Name	Licence area	FM	AM	DAB	DAB+
Adventist World Radio	Greater London				12A
Athavan Radio	Greater London				11B; Also on small-scale DAB+
Bloomberg Radio	Greater London			11B	
Boom Light	Greater London				12A; Also on small-scale DAB+
BritAsia Radio	South London and Surrey				10C; Also on small-scale DAB+
Broadland Radio	Norfolk				10B
Capital Chill	England				10B (Norfolk); 10C (Northamptonshire and North Devon); 11B (Greater London and Leicestershire); 11C (Cambridgeshire, East Devon, Exeter, Kent, Swindon and Torbay); 12C (Nottinghamshire); 12D (Berkshire, Essex, North Hampshire, Peterborough and Plymouth)
Capital Liverpool	Merseyside, West Cheshire and Flintshire	107.6 (Liverpool)		10C	
Capital London	Greater London	95.8		12C	
Capital Manchester and Lancashire	Greater Manchester	102.0		12C	
Capital Manchester and Lancashire	Lancashire	99.8 (Burnley and Pendle); 102.8 (Chorley); 106.5 (Preston and Leyland); 107.0 (Blackburn, Accrington and Darwen)		12A	
Capital Mid-Counties	Coventry and Warwickshire	96.2 (Coventry); 102.0 (Stratford-upon-Avon); 107.1 (Rugby); 107.3 (Leamington Spa and Warwick)		12D	
Capital Mid-Counties	North Oxfordshire	107.6 (Banbury and Brackley)			
Capital Mid-Counties	South East Staffordshire	101.6 (Lichfield and Tamworth); 102.4 (Burton upon Trent and Swadlincote)			
Capital Midlands	Birmingham, Black Country and Shropshire	102.2 (Birmingham)		11C (Birmingham); 11B (Black Country and Shropshire)	
Capital Midlands	Derbyshire	102.8 (Derby)		10B	
Capital Midlands	Leicestershire	105.4 (Leicestershire and Rutland)		11B	
Capital Midlands	Nottinghamshire	96.2 (Nottingham); 96.5 (Mansfield)		12C	
Capital North East	Teesside	106.4		11B	
Capital North East	Tyne and Wear and Northumberland	105.3 (Newcastle upon Tyne); 105.6 (Fenham); 105.8 (Hexham)		11C	
Capital South	Brighton and Sussex	107.2 (Brighton and Hove)		10B	
Capital South	South Coast	103.2 (Southampton)		11C (South Hampshire); 11B (Dorset)	
Capital Yorkshire	East Riding of Yorkshire	105.8		10D (Humberside)	
Capital Yorkshire	North, South and West Yorkshire	105.1 (South and West Yorkshire); 105.6 (Bradford, Rotherham and Sheffield)		12D (Leeds); 10C (North Yorkshire); 11B (Bradford, Halifax and Huddersfield); 11C (South Yorkshire)	
Capital Xtra	London	96.9 (South London); 107.1 (North London)			
Chester's Dee Radio	West Cheshire and North East Wales	106.3 (Chester)		10D	
Cheshire's Silk Radio	East Cheshire	106.9			Small-scale DAB+
Classic FM Christmas (on-air until late December)	Greater London				11B
Classic FM Movies	Greater London				12C
Colourful Radio	Greater London				12A
CountryLine Radio	Greater London				12A
Darbar Sahib Radio	South London and Surrey				10C; Also on small-scale DAB+
Energy Radio	South London and Surrey				10C
Radio Essex	Essex	105.1 (Southend-on-Sea); 107.7 (Chelmsford)		12D	
Radio Exe	Devon	107.3 (Exeter)			11C (East Devon, Exeter and Torbay); 10C (North Devon); Also on small-scale DAB+
Fosse 107	North West and South West Leicestershire	107.9 (Hinckley and Nuneaton); 107.0 (Loughborough)			
Fresh Soundz Radio	South London and Surrey				10C; Also on small-scale DAB+
GB Music Radio	Greater London				12A; Also on small-scale DAB+
GenX Radio	Suffolk				10C
Get Radio	Oxfordshire			10B	
Gold Radio	Greater London				12C
Greatest Hits Radio Bucks, Beds and Herts	Buckinghamshire, Bedfordshire and Hertfordshire	96.2 (Aylesbury)			10D
Greatest Hits Radio East	Cambridgeshire	105.6 (Cambridge)			11C
Greatest Hits Radio East	Essex	100.2 (North East Essex)			12D
Greatest Hits Radio East	Norfolk and North Suffolk	99.9 (Norwich); 96.2 (Fakenham and North East Norfolk); 97.4 (Great Yarmouth and Southwold); 103.2 (Cromer, North West Norfolk and Sheringham); 103.4 (Great Yarmouth and Lowestoft)			10B
Greatest Hits Radio East	Suffolk	106.4			10C
Greatest Hits Radio East	West Norfolk	96.7		Small-scale DAB	
Greatest Hits Radio East Yorkshire	East Riding of Yorkshire and North Lincolnshire			10D	
Greatest Hits Radio Harrogate & the Yorkshire Dales	Harrogate and the Yorkshire Dales	97.2 (Harrogate); 107.1 (Ilkley, Pateley Bridge and Skipton); 107.8 (Craven District)			
Greatest Hits Radio Kent	Kent				11C
Greatest Hits Radio Lincolnshire	Lincolnshire	102.2; 96.4 (Grimsby); 96.7 (Grantham); 97.6 (Scunthorpe)			12A
Greatest Hits Radio London	Greater London	105.8		12C	
Greatest Hits Radio Midlands	Birmingham and the West Midlands	105.2		11C (Birmingham)	
Greatest Hits Radio Midlands	Black Country and Shropshire	106.5 (Shrewsbury); 107.1 (Oswestry); 107.2 (Kidderminster); 107.4 (Telford); 107.7 (Wolverhampton)			11B
Greatest Hits Radio Midlands	Coventry and Warwickshire				12D
Greatest Hits Radio Midlands	East Midlands	106.0; 96.7 (Ashbourne, Derbyshire); 101.8 (Wirksworth and Uttoxeter); 103.3 (Hope Valley and Whaley Bridge); 106.4 (Buxton and Glossop); 106.6 (Chapel-en-le-Frith)			10B (Derbyshire); 11B (Leicestershire); 12C (Nottinghamshire)
Greatest Hits Radio Midlands	Herefordshire and Worcestershire				12A
Greatest Hits Radio Midlands	North Derbyshire	102.0 (Bakewell and Matlock); 107.4 (Chesterfield)			Small-scale DAB+
Greatest Hits Radio Midlands	Staffordshire and Cheshire	96.4 (Congleton); 96.9 (Stafford)		12D (Stoke-on-Trent)	
Greatest Hits Radio Northamptonshire	Northamptonshire				10C
Greatest Hits Radio North East	County Durham, Northumberland and Tyne and Wear			11C	
Greatest Hits Radio North West	Cumbria and South West Scotland	96.4 (North Cumbria and South West Scotland); 102.2 (Workington); 102.5 (Penrith); 103.4 (Whitehaven)		11B (Cumbria)	
Greatest Hits Radio North West	Lancashire	96.5 (Blackpool)		12A	
Greatest Hits Radio North West	Liverpool and the North West	105.9 (Merseyside, West Cheshire and Flintshire); 107.2 (Warrington, Widnes and Runcorn)		10C (Merseyside, West Cheshire and Flintshire)	
Greatest Hits Radio North West	Manchester and the North West	96.2 (Oldham); 102.4 (Wigan, Skelmersdale and St Helens); 104.9 (Stockport); 107.4 (Bolton and Bury)		12C (Greater Manchester)	
Greatest Hits Radio Peterborough	Peterborough, Rutland and Stamford	107.7 (Peterborough); 97.4 (Stamford); 107.2 (Rutland)			12D
Greatest Hits Radio South	Berkshire and North Hampshire	105.6 (Newbury); 106.4 (Andover); 107.0 (Reading); 107.4 (Hungerford); 107.6 (Basingstoke)			12D
Greatest Hits Radio South	Dorset	96.0 (West Dorset); 96.6 (Blandford Forum); 97.2 (Dorchester and Weymouth); 97.4 (Shaftesbury); 105.8 (Poole)			11B
Greatest Hits Radio South	Oxfordshire	106.8 (Oxford); 106.4 (Bicester, Wallingford, Wantage and Witney)			10B
Greatest Hits Radio South	Salisbury	102.0 (South Wiltshire)		Small-scale DAB	
Greatest Hits Radio South	South Hampshire and the Isle of Wight	105.2			11C
Greatest Hits Radio South	Surrey and East Hampshire	96.4 (Guildford); 97.1 (Haslemere); 101.6 (Four Marks and Hindhead); 101.8 (Petersfield); 102.0 (Alton and Bordon)			10C (Surrey)
Greatest Hits Radio South	Sussex	96.6 (Chichester and Bognor Regis); 102.3 (Littlehampton and Arundel); 106.6 (North West Sussex)			10B
Greatest Hits Radio South West	Bristol and Bath	107.2 (Bristol)			11B
Greatest Hits Radio South West	Cornwall	102.2 (East Cornwall); 102.8 (West Cornwall)			11B
Greatest Hits Radio South West	Devon	105.5 (Torbay)			10C (North Devon); 11C (East Devon, Exeter and Torbay)
Greatest Hits Radio South West	Gloucestershire	107.5 (Cheltenham and Tewkesbury)			10C
Greatest Hits Radio South West	Plymouth	106.7			12D
Greatest Hits Radio South West	Somerset	100.8 (Porlock); 102.4 (Minehead); 105.6 (Yeovil); 106.6 (Chard and Ilminster); 107.4 (Bridgwater); 107.7 (Weston-super-Mare)			10B
Greatest Hits Radio South West	Swindon	107.7			11C
Greatest Hits Radio South West	Wiltshire	107.5 (Warminster); 107.9 (Bath)			10D (West Wiltshire and Bath)
Greatest Hits Radio South Yorkshire	South Yorkshire	96.1 (Rotherham); 97.1 (Penistone); 102.0 (Barnsley); 107.1 (Doncaster); 107.9 (North Nottinghamshire)		11C	
Greatest Hits Radio Teesside	Teesside			11B	
Greatest Hits Radio West Yorkshire	West Yorkshire	96.3 (Leeds); 106.8 (Wakefield)		11B (Bradford, Halifax and Huddersfield); 12D (Leeds)	
Greatest Hits Radio York and North Yorkshire	North Yorkshire	104.7 (York); 102.3 (Thirsk); 103.5 (Northallerton and Bedale)			10C
Greatest Hits Radio Yorkshire Coast	Scarborough, Bridlington and Whitby	96.2 (Scarborough); 102.4 (Bridlington); 103.1 (Whitby)			
Happy Radio UK	West Cheshire and North East Wales				10D; Also on small-scale DAB+
Heart 10s	England				10B (Derbyshire, Norfolk, Oxfordshire and Sussex); 10C (Northamptonshire and North Devon); 10D (Bath, Bedfordshire, Buckinghamshire, Hertfordshire, Humberside and West Wiltshire); 11B (Bath, Bristol, Cornwall, Greater London and Leicestershire); 11C (Birmingham, Cambridgeshire, East Devon, Exeter, Kent, Swindon and Torbay); 12C (Nottinghamshire); 12D (Berkshire, Essex, North Hampshire, Peterborough and Plymouth)
Heart Derbyshire	Derbyshire				10B
Heart East	Buckinghamshire, Bedfordshire and Hertfordshire	97.6; 96.9 (Bedfordshire); 103.3 (Milton Keynes)		10D	
Heart East	Cambridgeshire	103.0 (Cambridge); 97.4 (Newmarket and Haverhill)		11C	
Heart East	Essex	96.1 (Colchester); 96.3 (Basildon, Canvey Island and Wickford); 97.5 (Southend-on-Sea); 102.6 (Chelmsford and Maldon); 101.7 (Harlow, West Essex and East Hertfordshire)		12D	
Heart East	Norfolk	102.4 (East Norfolk)		10B	
Heart East	Northamptonshire	96.6		10C	
Heart East	Peterborough	102.7		12D	
Heart East	Suffolk	96.4 (Bury St Edmunds); 97.1 (Ipswich)		10C	
Heart Hertfordshire	Hertfordshire	106.9 (Hertford, Hitchin and Letchworth); 96.6 (Dacorum, St Albans, Three Rivers District and Watford); 106.7 (Stevenage)			Small-scale DAB+
Heart Leicestershire	Leicestershire				11B
Heart London	Greater London	106.2		12C	
Heart North East	Teesside	100.7		11B	
Heart North East	Tyne and Wear and Northumberland	101.8 (Tyne and Wear); 96.2 (Fenham); 101.2 (Hexham and Sunderland)		11C	
Heart North West	North West England	105.4		12C (Greater Manchester); 10C (Merseyside, West Cheshire and Flintshire); 12A (Lancashire)	
Heart North West	North Lancashire and Cumbria	96.9 (Morecambe Bay); 102.3 (Windermere); 103.2 (Kendal)		11B (Morecambe Bay)	
Heart Nottinghamshire	Nottinghamshire				12C
Heart South	Berkshire and North Hampshire	102.9 (Berkshire); 97.0 (Reading); 103.4 (Henley-on-Thames)		12D	
Heart South	Crawley and Surrey	102.7 (Crawley and Reigate); 97.5 (Horsham)		10C (Surrey)	
Heart South	Dorset	102.3 (Bournemouth)		11B	
Heart South	Hampshire	96.7 (Southampton and Winchester); 97.5 (Portsmouth)		11C (South Hampshire)	
Heart South	Kent	95.9 (Thanet District); 96.1 (Ashford); 97.0 (Dover and Folkestone); 102.8 (East Kent); 103.1 (Maidstone and Medway)		11C	
Heart South	Oxfordshire	102.6 (Oxfordshire and Swindon); 97.4 (Banbury and Brackley)		10B	
Heart South	Sussex	96.9 (Newhaven and Seaford); 102.0 (Hastings); 102.4 (East Sussex); 103.5 (Brighton and Worthing)		10B	
Heart West	Bath	103.0		10D (Bath and West Wiltshire)	
Heart West	Bristol	96.3		11B (Bristol and Bath)	
Heart West	Cornwall	105.1 (East Cornwall); 107.0 (West Cornwall)		11B	
Heart West	Devon	96.2 (North Devon); 96.4 (Torbay); 96.6 (Tavistock); 97.0 (Exeter and Plymouth); 97.3 (Ilfracombe); 100.5 (Totnes); 100.8 (Dartmouth); 101.2 (South Hams); 101.9 (Ivybridge); 103.0 (East Devon)		10C (North Devon); 11C (East Devon, Exeter and Torbay); 12D (Plymouth)	
Heart West	Gloucestershire	102.4 (Gloucester and Cheltenham); 103.0 (Stroud)		10C	
Heart West	Somerset	102.6; 96.5 (Taunton); 97.1 (Yeovil); 103.0 (Weston-super-Mare)		10B	
Heart West	Wiltshire	102.2 (West Wiltshire); 96.5 (Marlborough); 97.2 (Swindon, Cirencester and West Oxfordshire)		10D (West Wiltshire and Bath); 11C (Swindon)	
Heart West Midlands	West Midlands	100.7		11C (Birmingham); 11B (Black Country and Shropshire); 12D (Coventry and Warwickshire)	
Heart Yorkshire	Yorkshire	106.2 (South and West Yorkshire); 107.6 (Bradford); 107.7 (Sheffield and Rotherham)		12D (Leeds); 11B (Bradford, Halifax and Huddersfield); 11C (South Yorkshire)	
Heart Love	England				10B (Derbyshire, Norfolk, Oxfordshire and Sussex); 10C (Northamptonshire and North Devon); 10D (Bath, Bedfordshire, Buckinghamshire, Hertfordshire, Humberside and West Wiltshire); 11B (Bath, Bristol, Cornwall, Greater London and Leicestershire); 11C (Cambridgeshire, East Devon, Exeter, Kent, Swindon and Torbay); 12C (Nottinghamshire); 12D (Berkshire, Essex, North Hampshire, Peterborough and Plymouth)
Heart Musicals	England				10B (Norfolk); 10C (North Devon); 11B (Greater London and Leicestershire); 11C (Cambridgeshire, East Devon, Exeter, Kent, Swindon and Torbay); 12C (Nottinghamshire); 12D (Berkshire, North Hampshire, Peterborough and Plymouth)
Hits Radio Berkshire & North Hampshire	Berkshire and North Hampshire				12D
Hits Radio Birmingham	Birmingham	96.4		11C	
Hits Radio Black Country & Shropshire	Black Country and Shropshire	97.2 (Black Country); 103.1 (Shropshire)			11B
Hits Radio Bucks, Beds & Herts	Buckinghamshire, Bedfordshire and Hertfordshire				10D
Hits Radio Cambridgeshire	Cambridgeshire	100.7 (Cambridge); 107.1 (Ely); 107.3 (Saffron Walden); 107.9 (Haverhill, Suffolk)			11C
Hits Radio Cornwall	Cornwall				11B
Hits Radio Coventry & Warwickshire	Coventry and Warwickshire	97.0 (Coventry); 102.9 (Leamington Spa and Warwick)			12D
Hits Radio Cumbria	Cumbria			11B	
Hits Radio Devon	Devon				10C (North Devon); 11C (East Devon, Exeter and Torbay); 12D (Plymouth)
Hits Radio Dorset	Dorset	107.6 (Bournemouth, Christchurch and Poole)			11B
Hits Radio East Midlands	East Midlands				10B (Derbyshire); 11B (Leicestershire); 12C (Nottinghamshire)
Hits Radio East Yorkshire & North Lincolnshire	East Riding of Yorkshire and North Lincolnshire	96.9		10D	
Hits Radio Essex	Essex				12D
Hits Radio Gloucestershire	Gloucestershire				10C
Hits Radio Herefordshire & Worcestershire	Herefordshire and Worcestershire	97.6 (Herefordshire); 102.8 (Worcestershire); 96.7 (Kidderminster)			12A
Hits Radio Kent	Kent				11C
Hits Radio Lancashire	Lancashire	97.4		12A	
Hits Radio Lincolnshire	Lincolnshire				12A
Hits Radio Liverpool	Merseyside, West Cheshire and Flintshire	96.7		10C	
Hits Radio London	Greater London	100.0		12C	
Hits Radio Manchester	Greater Manchester	103.0		12C	
Hits Radio Norfolk	Norfolk	106.1		Small-scale DAB	10B
Hits Radio Northamptonshire	Northamptonshire				10C
Hits Radio North East	County Durham, Northumberland and Tyne and Wear	97.1 (Newcastle upon Tyne); 102.6 (Alnwick); 103.0 (Fenham); 103.2 (Hexham)		11C	
Hits Radio North Yorkshire	North Yorkshire				10C
Hits Radio Oxfordshire	Oxfordshire	107.9 (Oxford)			10B
Hits Radio Peterborough, Stamford & Rutland	Peterborough, Stamford and Rutland				12D
Hits Radio South Coast	South Hampshire and the Isle of Wight				11C
Hits Radio South Yorkshire	South Yorkshire	97.4 (Sheffield); 102.9 (Barnsley and Rotherham); 103.4 (Doncaster)		11C	
Hits Radio Staffordshire & Cheshire	Staffordshire and South Cheshire	102.6 (Stoke-on-Trent)		12D	
Hits Radio Suffolk	Suffolk				10C
Hits Radio Surrey & East Hampshire	Surrey and East Hampshire				10C
Hits Radio Sussex	Sussex				10B
Hits Radio Swindon	Swindon, West Wiltshire and Bath				11C (Swindon); 10D (West Wiltshire and Bath)
Hits Radio Teesside	Teesside	96.6		11B	
Hits Radio West of England	West of England and South Wales	101.0; 97.2 (Bristol)			10B (Somerset); 11B (Bath and Bristol)
Hits Radio West Yorkshire	West Yorkshire	97.5 (Bradford); 102.5 (Halifax and Huddersfield)		11B (Bradford, Halifax and Huddersfield); 12D (Leeds)	
In Demand Decades	West Cheshire and North East Wales				10D
In Demand Radio	West Cheshire and North East Wales				10D
Isle of Wight Radio	Isle of Wight and South Hampshire	107.0 (Isle of Wight); 102.0 (Cowes and Ryde)			11C
Radio Jackie	South West London and North Surrey	107.8			
Kiss	Greater London				12C
KMFM	Kent	96.2 (Tonbridge); 96.4 (Folkestone and Hythe); 100.4 (Medway); 101.6 (Sevenoaks); 105.6 (Maidstone); 106.0 (Canterbury); 106.8 (Dover); 107.2 (Thanet District); 107.6 (Ashford); 107.9 (Medway)		11C	
LBC	Greater London	97.3			
LBC News	Greater London				11B
Liberty Radio	South London and Surrey				10C; Also on small-scale DAB+
Lincs Sound	Lincolnshire				12A
London Greek Radio	North London	103.3			Small-scale DAB+
Love 80s	West Cheshire and North East Wales				10D; Also on small-scale DAB+
Lyca Gold	Greater London		1035		11B
Lyca Radio	Greater London		1458		11B
Lyca Radio	Greater Manchester, East Lancashire and West Yorkshire		1377 (Manchester); 963 (East Lancashire)	12C (Greater Manchester)	11B (Bradford, Halifax and Huddersfield); 12D (Leeds)
Lyca Radio	Midlands			11B (Leicestershire)	10B (Derbyshire); 11B (Black Country and Shropshire); 11C (Birmingham); 12D (Coventry and Warwickshire)
Magic Radio	Greater London and Bristol	105.4 (Greater London); 106.5 (Bristol)			12C (Greater London)
Magna Mix	Lincolnshire				12A; Also on small-scale DAB+
Magna Radio	Lincolnshire				12A; Also on small-scale DAB+
Mansfield Radio	Mansfield	103.2			
Matryoshka Radio	Greater London				11B; Also on small-scale DAB+
Mi-Soul	Greater London				12A; Also on small-scale DAB+
More Radio	Sussex	106.4 (Haywards Heath); 106.8 (Lewes); 107.5 (Eastbourne); 107.7 (Worthing); 107.8 (Hastings)			10B
Nation Easy Radio	Southampton, Portsmouth and Winchester	107.8 (Southampton); 107.4 (Portsmouth); 107.2 (Winchester)			11B (Dorset); 11C (South Hampshire); 12D (Berkshire and North Hampshire); Also on small-scale DAB+
Nation Radio London	Greater London and West Essex	107.5 (East London and West Essex)			12A
Nation Radio North East	North East England	103.4 (Sunderland); 102.6 (Richmond); 102.8 (Durham); 103.2 (Darlington); 106.8 (Brusselton)			Small-scale DAB+
Nation Radio South	Dorset and South East England	106.0 (South Hampshire and the Isle of Wight); 106.6 (Bournemouth, Poole and Winchester)			10B (Sussex); 11B (Dorset); 11C (South Hampshire); 12D (North Hampshire and Berkshire); Also on small-scale DAB+
Nation Radio Suffolk	Suffolk	102.0 (Ipswich)			10C
Nation Radio Westcountry	South West England				10B (Somerset); 10C (North Devon); 11B (Cornwall); 11C (East Devon, Exeter and Torbay); 12D (Plymouth)
Nation Radio Yorkshire	Yorkshire and Lincolnshire	99.8 (Kingston upon Hull)			10C (North Yorkshire); 12A (Lincolnshire)
Panjab Radio	England		558 (Greater London)	10B (Derbyshire); 11B (Black Country and Shropshire); 12D (Coventry and Warwickshire)	11B (Greater London); Also on small-scale DAB+
Point Blank Radio	South London and Surrey				10C
Polish Radio London	South London and Surrey				10C; Also on small-scale DAB+
Premier Christian Radio	London and Surrey		1305 (North and South London); 1413 (East and West London); 1566 (Guildford)		
Premier Gospel	Greater London				11B; Also on small-scale DAB+
Rewind Radio	Cornwall			11B	
Rewind Radio Retro	Cornwall				11B
Sabras Radio	Leicestershire	91.0 (Leicester); 102.1 (Loughborough)	1260	11B	Small-scale DAB+
Sami Swoi Radio	South London and Surrey				10C; Also on small-scale DAB+
Sanskar Radio	Leicestershire			11B	Small-scale DAB+
Smooth 70s	England				10B (Derbyshire, Norfolk, Oxfordshire and Sussex); 10C (Northamptonshire and North Devon); 10D (Bath, Bedfordshire, Buckinghamshire, Hertfordshire, Humberside and West Wiltshire); 11B (Bath, Bristol, Cornwall, Greater London and Leicestershire); 11C (Cambridgeshire, East Devon, Exeter, Kent, Swindon and Torbay); 12C (Nottinghamshire); 12D (Berkshire, Essex, North Hampshire, Peterborough and Plymouth)
Smooth Bristol and Bath	Bristol and Bath				11B
Smooth Devon	Devon and Cornwall				10C (North Devon); 11C (East Devon, Exeter and Torbay); 12D (Plymouth); 11B (Cornwall)
Smooth Dorset	Dorset				11B
Smooth East Midlands	Derbyshire			10B	
Smooth East Midlands	East Midlands	106.6; 101.4 (Derby)		12C (Nottinghamshire); 11B (Leicestershire)	
Smooth East Midlands	Northamptonshire and Peterborough	97.2 (Wellingborough); 106.8 (Peterborough); 107.4 (Corby and Kettering)			
Smooth Essex	Essex				12D
Smooth Hampshire	Hampshire				11C (South Hampshire)
Smooth Herts, Beds and Bucks	Hertfordshire, Bedfordshire and Buckinghamshire				10D
Smooth Kent	Kent				11C
Smooth Lake District	Lake District	100.1 (Kendal); 100.8 (Ambleside and Windermere); 101.4 (Keswick)		11B (Morecambe Bay)	
Smooth London	Greater London	102.2		12C	
Smooth Norfolk	Norfolk				10B
Smooth North East	Northumberland and Tyne and Wear	97.5; 96.4 (Hexham); 107.5 (Newcastle upon Tyne)		11C	
Smooth North East	Teesside	107.7		11B	
Smooth North West	North West England	100.4		12C (Greater Manchester); 10C (Merseyside, West Cheshire and Flintshire); 12A (Lancashire)	
Smooth Suffolk	Suffolk			10C	
Smooth Sussex	Sussex				10B
Smooth Thames Valley	Thames Valley				10B (Oxfordshire); 12D (Berkshire and North Hampshire)
Smooth West Midlands	West Midlands	105.7		11C (Birmingham); 11B (Black Country and Shropshire); 12D (Coventry and Warwickshire)	
Smooth Wiltshire	Wiltshire				10D (West Wiltshire and Bath); 11C (Swindon)
Smooth Christmas (on-air until late December)	Greater London				11B
Smooth Soul	England				10B (Norfolk); 10C (Northamptonshire and North Devon); 11B (Greater London and Leicestershire); 11C (Cambridgeshire, East Devon, Exeter, Kent, Swindon and Torbay); 12C (Nottinghamshire); 12D (Berkshire, Essex, North Hampshire, Peterborough and Plymouth)
Sout al Khaleej	Greater London			11B	
Subjam	Bedfordshire, Buckinghamshire and Hertfordshire				10D; Also on small-scale DAB+
Sunrise Hits	Greater London				12A
Sunrise Radio	London		963 (East London); 972 (West London)		
Sunrise Radio (Yorkshire)	West Yorkshire	103.2 (Bradford); 100.6 (Halifax and Keighley)			Small-scale DAB+
Sunrise Retro	Greater London				12A
Sunshine Radio (Herefordshire and Monmouthshire)	Herefordshire and Monmouthshire	106.2 (Hereford); 107.0 (Monmouth); 107.8 (Abergavenny)		10C (Gloucestershire); 12A (Herefordshire and Worcestershire)	
Sunshine Radio (Ludlow)	Ludlow	105.9 (Ludlow); 107.8 (Cleehill)			Small-scale DAB+
TFS Radio	Surrey and South London				10C
This is the Coast	North Yorkshire, East Riding of Yorkshire and Lincolnshire				10C (North Yorkshire); 12A (East Riding of Yorkshire and Lincolnshire)
Track Radio	Greater London				12A
V2 Radio	Sussex and South Hampshire			10B (Sussex); 11C (South Hampshire)	Small-scale DAB+
Virgin Radio Christmas (on-air until late December)	Greater London				12A
Voice of Islam Radio	Greater London			11B; Also on small-scale DAB	Small-scale DAB+
Radio X	Greater London and Greater Manchester	104.9 (Greater London); 97.7 (Greater Manchester); National station with local advertising			
Radio X 90s	England	106.1 (Greater Manchester)			10B (Derbyshire, Norfolk, Oxfordshire and Sussex); 10C (North Devon); 10D (Bath, Bedfordshire, Buckinghamshire, Hertfordshire, Humberside and West Wiltshire); 11B (Bath, Bristol, Cornwall, Greater London and Leicestershire); 11C (Cambridgeshire, East Devon, Exeter, Kent, Swindon and Torbay); 12C (Nottinghamshire); 12D (Berkshire, Essex, North Hampshire, Peterborough and Plymouth); Also on small-scale DAB+
Radio X 00s	Greater London, Cambridgeshire and Peterborough				11B (Greater London); 11C (Cambridgeshire); 12D (Peterborough)
Radio X Chilled	England				10B (Norfolk); 10C (North Devon); 11B (Greater London and Leicestershire); 11C (Cambridgeshire, East Devon, Exeter, Kent, Swindon and Torbay); 12C (Nottinghamshire); 12D (Berkshire, Essex, North Hampshire, Peterborough and Plymouth)
Radio XL	West Midlands		1296		Small-scale DAB+
YorkMix Radio	North Yorkshire				10C
Your Harrogate	North Yorkshire				10C

==== Former English stations ====
This list details radio stations which have lost their licence to broadcast or have closed down due to financial issues.

Name	Licence area	FM	AM	DAB	Date closed
Abbey FM	Barrow-in-Furness	107.3			30 January 2009 – Station put into administration
Airport Information Radio	Heathrow Airport and Gatwick Airport		1584		11 February 1992 – Closed after just over one year on-air
Buzz FM	Birmingham	102.4			1 January 1995 – Lost licence and was replaced by Choice FM 102.2
Centre Radio	Leicestershire	97.1	1260		6 October 1983 – Ceased trading due to financial issues
Channel Travel Radio	Kent channel ports	107.6			28 September 2000
Radio City Talk	Merseyside, Cheshire and North Wales		1548	10C	31 May 2020 – Closed due to low listening figures
DevonAir Radio	Exeter and Torquay	97.0; 96.4	666; 954		1 January 1995 – Lost licence and was replaced by Gemini Radio
Dune FM	Southport	107.9			9 August 2012 – Station received winding-up order and transmitter was seized by Ofcom
Fen Radio 107.5	Wisbech	107.5			31 July 2008
Mersey 106.7	Liverpool	106.7			1 April 2009 – Licence revoked by Ofcom
Mix 107	High Wycombe	107.4; 107.7			1 July 2009
Oak FM	North West and South West Leicestershire	107.0 (Loughborough); 107.9 (Hinckley)			28 July 2016 – Closed due to station owner going into liquidation
Pennine FM	Huddersfield	107.9			5 April 2010
South London Radio	Lewisham	107.3			3 April 2009
Star 107.9	Stroud	107.9			29 September 2006
Sunrise Radio East Midlands	Leicestershire		1260		7 September 1995 – Lost licence and was replaced by Sabras Radio
Sunset 102	Manchester	102.0			October 1993 – Station went into liquidation
Sunshine 1530	Worcestershire		1530		6 April 2010 – Closed following problem with transfer of broadcast licence
Time 106.6	East Berkshire, South Buckinghamshire, North Surrey and West London	106.6			15 October 2015
Time 106.8	Thamesmead	106.8			3 April 2009
Time 107.5	East London and West Essex	107.5			1 August 2025 – Replaced on FM by Nation Radio London
Radio Victory	Portsmouth	95.0	1170		28 June 1986 – Lost licence and was replaced by Ocean Sound
WNK	North London	103.3			Easter 1993 – Broadcast hours were reallocated to London Greek Radio
Yorkshire Radio	Yorkshire			12C	30 July 2013

==== Scotland ====
Local and regional analogue and digital stations: Scotland
Name	Licence area	FM	DAB	DAB+
Argyll FM	Kintyre, Islay and Jura	106.5 (Campbeltown); 107.1 (Machrihanish); 107.7 (South Knapdale)		
Capital Scotland	Glasgow	106.1	11C	
Capital Scotland	Edinburgh, Lothian and Fife	105.7	12D	
Central FM	Stirling, Falkirk and Clackmannanshire	103.1		Small-scale DAB+
Clyde 1	Glasgow and West Central Scotland	102.5; 97.0 (Vale of Leven); 102.3 (Rothesay); 103.3 (Firth of Clyde)	11C	
Clyde 1 Ayrshire	Ayrshire	96.7; 97.5 (Girvan); 106.7 (Rothesay)	11B	
Forth 1	Edinburgh, Lothian and Fife	97.3; 97.6; 102.2 (Penicuik)	12D	
Go Radio (Glasgow)	Central Scotland		11D	
Greatest Hits Radio Ayrshire	Ayrshire			11B
Greatest Hits Radio Dumfries & Galloway	Dumfries and Galloway	97.0 (Dumfries); 96.5 (Stranraer); 103.0 (Kirkcudbright)		
Greatest Hits Radio Edinburgh, Lothians & Fife	Edinburgh, Lothian, Fife and Falkirk		12D	
Greatest Hits Radio Glasgow & the West	Glasgow and West Central Scotland		11C	
Greatest Hits Radio North East Scotland	Aberdeen and Aberdeenshire			11C
Greatest Hits Radio North Scotland	Inverness			11B
Greatest Hits Radio Scottish Borders & North Northumberland	Scottish Borders and North Northumberland	96.8 (Selkirk); 102.3 (Berwick-upon-Tweed); 103.1 (Peebles); 103.4 (Eyemouth)		
Greatest Hits Radio Tayside & Fife	Dundee and Perth		11B	
Heart Scotland	East Scotland	101.1 (Edinburgh); 103.3 (Penicuik)	12D (Lothian and Fife)	
Heart Scotland	West Scotland	100.3 (Glasgow); 100.0 (Alexandria and Dunbartonshire); 101.1 (Rosneath)	11C (Glasgow)	
Hits Radio Ayrshire	Ayrshire			11B
Hits Radio Edinburgh	Lothian and Fife		12D	
Hits Radio Glasgow	Glasgow		11C	
Hits Radio North East Scotland	Aberdeen and Aberdeenshire			11C
Hits Radio North Scotland	Inverness			11B
Hits Radio Tayside	Dundee and Perth		11B	
Isles FM	Isle of Lewis	103.0		
MFR	Inverness, Moray and Caithness	97.4 (Inverness); 96.6 (Speyside); 102.5 (Caithness); 102.8 (Keith); 96.7 (Wick and Fraserburgh)	11B (Inverness)	
Nation Radio Scotland	Ayrshire and Central Scotland	96.3 (Glasgow)		11B (Ayrshire); 11D (Central Scotland)
Radio North Angus	Arbroath and Carnoustie	96.6 (Arbroath); 107.5 (Carnoustie); 105.9 (Monifieth); 87.7 (Brechin, Forfar and Montrose – LPFM)	11B (via Shared Access Channel on Mon-Fri 0730-1200, Sat 0730-1800, Sun 1200-1800)	
Northsound 1	Aberdeen and Aberdeenshire	96.9 (East Aberdeenshire); 97.6 (Aberdeen); 103.0 (Peterhead)	11C	
Now Ayrshire Radio	Ayrshire		11B	Small-scale DAB+
Original 106	Aberdeen and Aberdeenshire	106.8 (Aberdeen and East Aberdeenshire); 106.3 (North Aberdeen and Peterhead)	11C	
Original 106	Dundee and Perth	102.0 (Dundee); 106.6 (Perth)		
Original 106	Fife	105.4 (St Andrews); 106.3 (East Neuk); 95.2 (West Fife); 96.1 (Central and East Fife); 96.6 (Kirkcaldy)	11D (Central Scotland)	
Original 106 Gold	Aberdeen and Aberdeenshire		11C	
Rock.scot				8B (Coast DAB, Inverclyde and the Clyde Coast); 9B (Àir a Tuath, North Ayrshire); 9B (Sior Lannraig, Lanarkshire)
SIBC	Shetland	96.2; 102.2 (Lerwick)		
Radio Skye	Isle of Skye and Loch Alsh	102.7; 106.2 (Portree and Sleat); 107.2 (Staffin)		
Smooth Scotland	Central Scotland	105.2	11C (Glasgow); 12D (Lothian and Fife)	
STV Radio	Scotland		11B (Ayrshire); 11C (Aberdeen and Aberdeenshire); 11D (Central Scotland)	11B (Dundee, Inverness and Perth)
Talksport Scotland	Scotland		11C (Aberdeen and Aberdeenshire); 11D (Central Scotland)	
Tay FM	Tayside and North Fife	96.4 (Perth); 102.8 (Dundee)	11B	
Radio Wester Ross	Gairloch and Loch Ewe	106.0 (Gairloch); 106.6 (Loch Ewe); 102.2 (Ullapool); 101.8 (Shieldaig); 96.8 (North West Scotland)		

==== Former Scottish stations ====
Name	Licence area	FM	DAB	Date closed
Coast Radio	Aberdeen and Aberdeenshire	101.2 (Peterhead and Fraserburgh)	11C	30 November 2025
Heartland FM	Perthshire	97.5 (Pitlochry); 107.3 (Crieff)		26 July 2026
L107	Lanarkshire	107.9; 107.5 (Cumbernauld)		11 November 2010
NECR	Aberdeen and Aberdeenshire	102.1 (Inverurie); 103.2 (Colpy); 97.1 (Turriff and Braemar); 102.6 (Kildrummy); 106.4 (Strathdon); 101.9 (Ballater)	11C	15 August 2018
River FM	Livingston, West Lothian	103.4; 107.7		29 January 2007
talk 107	Edinburgh	107.0	11D (Central Scotland)	23 December 2008
Waves Radio	Aberdeen and Aberdeenshire	101.2 (Peterhead and Fraserburgh)	11C	May 2023 – Closed due to financial issues
XFM Scotland	Paisley, Renfrewshire	96.3	11D (Central Scotland); 11B (Ayrshire)	13 September 2015 – Station closed and licence returned after Ofcom refused request by Global to network 24/7 from London

==== Wales ====
Name	Licence area	FM	DAB	DAB+
Bayside Radio	Colwyn Bay			10D / 12D (North West Wales)
Bridge FM	Bridgend County Borough	106.3		12C (South East Wales)
Capital Anglesey & Gwynedd	Anglesey and Gwynedd	103.0	10D / 12D (North West Wales)	
Capital North West and North Wales	North Wales Coast	96.3 (Llandudno)	10D / 12D (North West Wales)	
Capital North West and North Wales	Wrexham, North East Wales, Chester, Shropshire and Wirral	103.4 (Wrexham, Shropshire and West Cheshire); 97.1 (Flintshire and Wirral)	10D (North East Wales and West Cheshire)	
Capital South Wales	South East Wales	103.2 (Cardiff); 97.4 (Newport)	12C	
Radio Carmarthenshire	Carmarthenshire	97.1; 97.5 (Carmarthen and Llanelli)		12D (Mid and West Wales)
Dragon Radio	Wales and West Cheshire			10D (North East Wales and West Cheshire); 10D / 12D (North West Wales); 12C (South East Wales); 12D (Mid and West Wales); Also on small-scale DAB+
Fun Kids Soundtracks	North East Wales and West Cheshire			10D
Greatest Hits Radio North Wales	North West Wales			10D / 12D
Greatest Hits Radio South Wales	South Wales		12A (Swansea, Carmarthenshire and Neath Port Talbot)	12C (South East Wales)
Heart North and Mid Wales	North Wales, Mid Wales and West Cheshire	88.0 (Wrexham, Chester, Market Drayton, parts of Merseyside and Oswestry); 102.8 (Welshpool); 105.7 (Llandudno); 106.0 (Newtown, Powys); 106.9 (Denbigh, Rhyl and Ruthin); 107.2 (Gwynedd); 107.3 (Prestatyn); 107.7 (Ceredigion)		10D (North East Wales and West Cheshire)
Heart South Wales	South and West Wales	105.4 (Cardiff, Bridgend and the Vale of Glamorgan); 102.3 (Pontypridd); 105.2 (Abergavenny and Carmarthenshire); 105.7 (Pembrokeshire); 105.9 (Newport, Aberdare and Merthyr Tydfil); 106.0 (Carmarthen and Swansea); 106.1 (Ebbw Vale and Tredegar); 106.2 (Fishguard); 107.3 (Bargoed and Blackwood)	12A (Carmarthenshire, Neath Port Talbot and Swansea); 12C (South East Wales)	12D (Mid and West Wales)
Hits Radio North Wales	North West Wales			10D / 12D
Hits Radio South Wales	South Wales	96.4 (Swansea, Neath Port Talbot and South Carmarthenshire)	12A (Swansea, Carmarthenshire and Neath Port Talbot)	12C (South East Wales)
Marcher Vibe	North East Wales and West Cheshire			10D
Nation Radio Wales	Wales and West Cheshire	102.9 (Carmarthenshire); 106.8 (South East Wales); 107.1 (Pembrokeshire); 107.3 (Swansea)		10D (North East Wales and West Cheshire); 10D / 12D (North West Wales); 12C (South East Wales); 12D (Mid and West Wales); Also on small-scale DAB+
Radio Pembrokeshire	Pembrokeshire	102.5		12D (Mid and West Wales)
Smooth Wales	North Wales		10D / 12D (North West Wales)	
Smooth Wales	South Wales			12C (South East Wales)
Sunshine Radio	Monmouthshire	See England listings		
Swansea Bay Radio	Swansea, Neath Port Talbot and South Carmarthenshire	102.1		12D (Mid and West Wales)

==== Former Welsh stations ====
Name	Licence area	FM	AM	Date closed
Radio Ceredigion	Ceredigion	96.6 (South East Ceredigion); 97.4 (Cardigan Town); 103.3 (Aberystwyth, North, Mid and West Ceredigion)		31 May 2019 – Networked as Nation Radio Wales
Radio Hafren	Mid Wales and the Borders	102.1	756	11 February 2015
Valleys Radio	South Wales Valleys		999; 1116	30 April 2009

==== Northern Ireland ====
Name	Licence area	FM	DAB	DAB+
Cool FM	Northern Ireland	97.4 (Greater Belfast)	12D	
Cool Old Skool	Northern Ireland			12D
Downtown Country	Northern Ireland		12D	
Downtown Radio	Northern Ireland	96.4 (Limavady); 96.6 (Enniskillen and Omagh); 97.1 (Larne); 102.3 (Ballymena); 102.4 (Derry); 103.1 (South Newry); 103.4 (Belfast and Newcastle)	12D	
Greatest Hits Radio Northern Ireland	Northern Ireland			12D
Hits Radio Northern Ireland	Northern Ireland			12D
Q Belfast 96.7 / 102.5	Belfast	96.7 (Greater Belfast); 102.5 (Ards and North Down)	12D	
Q Mid Antrim 107	Ballymena	107.0; 107.6 (Larne)		
Q Mid Ulster 106	Mid Ulster	106.0; 106.3; 107.2		
Q Newry and Mourne 100.5	Newry and Mourne	100.5; 101.1 (Kilkeel)		
Q North Coast 97.2	Coleraine	97.2; 97.6 (Ballycastle)		
Q North West 102.9	Derry	102.9		
Q Tyrone and Fermanagh 101.2	Omagh and Enniskillen	101.2; 102.1 (Enniskillen)		
U105	Northern Ireland	105.8 (Greater Belfast)	12D	

==== Former Northern Irish stations ====
Name	Licence area	AM	Date closed
Goldbeat 828	Cookstown	828	22 May 1999 – Radio Authority revoked the licence
Heartbeat 1521	Craigavon	1521	22 May 1999 – Radio Authority revoked the licence

==== The Channel Islands and the Isle of Man ====
Although the Channel Islands and the Isle of Man are not part of the UK, they are served by the UK's national radio stations. Additionally services in the Channel Islands are licensed by the UK's regulator, Ofcom. Services in the Isle of Man are not licensed by a UK regulator but rather by the Broadcasting Act 1990 of Tynwald.

Name	Licence area	FM	AM	DAB+
3FM	Isle of Man	104.2 (Port St Mary and Ramsey); 105.0 (South and East Isle of Man); 106.2 (Peel and West Isle of Man); 106.6 (Central Isle of Man)		
Bailiwick Radio	Channel Islands			12A
Channel 103	Jersey	103.7		12A
Energy FM	Isle of Man	91.2 (Central Isle of Man); 93.4 (North Isle of Man); 98.4 (Ramsey); 98.6 (South and East Isle of Man); 102.4 (Peel); 105.2 (Maughold and Port Erin)		Small-scale DAB+
Island FM	Guernsey, Alderney and Sark	104.7 (Guernsey); 93.7 (Alderney)		12A
Manx Radio	Isle of Man	89.0 (Central Isle of Man); 89.5 (Peel and Ramsey); 97.2 (South and East Isle of Man); 103.7 (North Isle of Man)	1368	Small-scale DAB+ Manx Radio FM and Manx Radio AM DAB+ channels
Soleil Radio	Channel Islands	107.7 (St Helier)		12A; Also on small-scale DAB+

== Community radio stations ==
Name	Licence area	FM	AM	DAB	DAB+	First air date
1BTN	Brighton	101.4			Small-scale DAB+	14 April 2017
Radio2Funky	Leicester	95.0			Small-scale DAB+	April 2020
3TFM	Saltcoats	103.1				18 April 2008
10Radio	Wiveliscombe	105.3				2 March 2008
100% Whatever Westcountry	Weston-super-Mare	100.5			10B (Somerset); Also on small-scale DAB+	1 June 2021
Abbey104	Sherborne	104.7				16 February 2013
Academy FM (Thanet)	Thanet District	107.8			Small-scale DAB+	5 April 2010
AHBS Community Radio	Ashford, Kent	107.1			Small-scale DAB+	26 December 1971
AIR 107.2	Weymouth and Portland	107.2				11 May 2011
Akash Radio	Leeds		1323		Small-scale DAB+	2015
Alfred Radio	Shaftesbury	107.3				14 February 2022
Alive Radio	Dumfries	107.3				1 September 2009
ALL FM	South, Central and East Manchester	96.9			Small-scale DAB+	22 May 2000
Amber Sound FM	Amber Valley	107.2 (Ripley, Derbyshire); 98.4 (Belper)				4 October 2008
Ambur Radio	Walsall	99.4			Small-scale DAB+	1 August 2009
Andover Radio	Andover, Hampshire	95.9				22 April 2018
Angel Radio	South Hampshire and West Sussex	94.8 (Chichester); 98.6 (Portsmouth and Havant)		11C (South Hampshire and Kent); 10C (Surrey); 11B (Dorset); Also on small-scale DAB	10B (Somerset); 12A (Channel Islands); Also on small-scale DAB+	February 2002
Angel Radio Isle of Wight	Newport, Isle of Wight	91.5			Small-scale DAB+	24 March 2007
Apple FM	Taunton	97.3				11 May 2013
Ashdown Radio	Crowborough and Uckfield	94.7 (Crowborough); 105.0 (Uckfield)				7 July 2003
Radio Asian Fever	Leeds	107.3				1 March 2007
Asian Star Radio	Slough	101.6			Small-scale DAB+	April 2007
Awaz FM	Glasgow	107.2			Small-scale DAB+	29 April 2002
Awaaz FM	Southampton	99.8				August 2017
B Radio	Reading, Berkshire	95.6				August 2021
Radio Bath	Bath and West Wiltshire				10D	2019
BCB 106.6fm	Bradford	106.6				1 March 2002
BCfm	Bristol	93.2		Small-scale DAB		26 March 2007
The Beat London	Harlesden	103.6			Small-scale DAB+	16 April 2007
Belfast 89FM	Belfast	89.3			Small-scale DAB+	30 June 2015
Beverley FM	Beverley	107.8				20 January 2015
Beyond Radio	Lancaster	103.5 (Lancaster and Morecambe); 107.5 (Carnforth)			11B (Morecambe Bay)	30 July 2016
BFBS Gurkha Radio	Various army camps	90.8 (Dover); 101.4 (Leconfield); 101.5 (Blandford Forum); 104.4 (Holywood, County Down); 105.4 (Shorncliffe); 106.8 (Woodbridge, Suffolk)	1134 (Bramcote, Bulford, Catterick and Sandhurst); 1278 (Shorncliffe, Stafford and Tidworth); 1287 (Aldershot, Brecon, Hullavington, Innsworth, Maidstone and Warminster)		Small-scale DAB+	2000
BFBS Northern Ireland	Aldergrove and Antrim	106.5				5 March 2008
BFBS Northern Ireland	Ballykinler	107.5				5 March 2008
BFBS Northern Ireland	Holywood, County Down	101.0				5 March 2008
BFBS Northern Ireland	Lisburn	100.6			Small-scale DAB+	8 May 2006
BFBS Radio	Aldershot	102.5				11 December 2006
BFBS Radio	Blandford Forum	89.3				23 August 2012
BFBS Radio	Brize Norton	106.1			Small-scale DAB+	October 2018
BFBS Radio	Catterick, North Yorkshire	106.9; 87.7 (Leconfield)				11 May 2006
BFBS Radio	Colchester	107.0			Small-scale DAB+	2 May 2006
BFBS Radio	Salisbury Plain	106.8			Small-scale DAB+	11 December 2006
BFBS Radio	Scotland	87.7 (Inverness); 94.0 (Glencorse); 98.5 (Edinburgh)			Small-scale DAB+	14 August 2006
BGfm 97.3	Blaenau Gwent	97.3				18 October 2007
BigglesFM	Biggleswade	104.8				22 April 2011
Bishop FM	Bishop Auckland	105.9			Small-scale DAB+	31 October 2009
Black Cat Radio	St Neots	102.5			Small-scale DAB+	17 April 2017
Black Country Radio	Black Country	92.2 (Dudley); 102.5 (Stourbridge)			Small-scale DAB+	1 January 2008
Black Diamond FM	East and Central Midlothian	107.1; 107.8				21 May 2007
Blast 106	Belfast	106.4			Small-scale DAB+	8 July 2009
Blast 106 (Causeway Coast)	Coleraine	106.4				October 2020
Blyth Valley Radio	Southwold	105.0				4 July 2009
96.5 Bolton FM	Bolton	96.5			Small-scale DAB+	20 June 2009
Bradford Asian Radio	Bradford		1413		Small-scale DAB+	July 2016
Bradley Stoke Radio	Bradley Stoke	103.4		Small-scale DAB	Small-scale DAB+	13 September 2013
Branch FM	Dewsbury	101.8				May 2007
BRFM 95.6 FM	Isle of Sheppey	95.6			Small-scale DAB+	30 October 2006
BRMB	Birmingham	89.1		Small-scale DAB	Small-scale DAB+	1 November 2005
Bro Radio	Vale of Glamorgan	98.1 (Barry); 98.4; 100.2 (Llantwit Major); 106.1			Small-scale DAB+	31 March 2009
Bute Island Radio	Rothesay	96.5				15 July 2009
Radio Cabin	Herne Bay	94.6				8 April 2017
Caithness FM	Caithness	106.5				January 2020
Cambridge 105	Cambridge	105.0		Small-scale DAB	Small-scale DAB+	19 July 2010
Cam FM	Cambridge	97.2				2 October 2010
CamGlen Radio	Cambuslang and Rutherglen	107.9				19 March 2015
Canalside Community Radio	North East Cheshire	102.8			Small-scale DAB+	4 December 2008
Cando FM	Barrow-in-Furness and Ulverston	106.3 (Barrow-in-Furness); 107.3 (Ulverston)		Small-scale DAB		November 2015
Radio Cardiff	Cardiff	98.7			Small-scale DAB+	8 October 2007
Radio Caroline	Suffolk, Kent and North Essex		648		Small-scale DAB+	22 December 2017
Caroline Coastal	Maldon District	94.7 (Maldon); 104.7 (Burnham-on-Crouch and Southminster)				19 October 2020
Castledown Radio	Tidworth	104.7; 107.6				4 November 2006
The Cat	Crewe and Nantwich	107.9			Small-scale DAB+	14 February 2015
CCR 104.4	Chelmsford	104.4				18 March 2017
Celtic Music Radio	Glasgow	95.0		Small-scale DAB	Small-scale DAB+	16 January 2008
CHAOS Radio	St Austell	105.6				28 January 2008
CHBN Radio	Truro	100.8				August 2014
Chiltern Voice FM	Amersham and Chesham	107.4				27 November 2021
Coast & County Radio	Scarborough and Whitby	97.4; 105.5; 106.7			10C (North Yorkshire); Also on small-scale DAB+	9 November 2016
Coast FM	Penzance	96.5; 97.2				30 August 2014
Corby Radio	Corby	96.3; 96.4			Small-scale DAB+	5 December 2009
CPR FM	Romney Marsh	95.1; 100.2			Small-scale DAB+	May 2021
Crescent Radio	Rochdale	97.0			Small-scale DAB+	12 September 2006
CRFM	Carlisle	102.7				15 April 2024
Cross Counties Radio	Lutterworth	92.0; 95.4				31 August 2020
Cross Rhythms	Stoke-on-Trent and Newcastle-under-Lyme	101.8 (Stoke-on-Trent); 96.6 (Newcastle-under-Lyme)			Small-scale DAB+	28 February 2002
Cross Rhythms	Plymouth	96.3				29 March 2007
Croydon FM	Croydon	97.8; 99.4			Small-scale DAB+	11 September 2021
Crystal FM	Penicuik	107.4				1 December 2013
CVFM	Middlesbrough	104.5			Small-scale DAB+	10 August 2009
Dales Radio	Yorkshire Dales	103.0; 104.9	936			11 January 2016
Radio Dawn 107.6FM	Nottingham	107.6			Small-scale DAB+	28 March 2006
Dean Radio	Cinderford	105.6; 95.7 (Lydney)				24 August 2018
Deveron FM	Banff, Aberdeenshire	105.3; 105.9; 107.4				24 September 2001
DevonAir Radio	Exmouth, Ottery St Mary, Sidmouth, Cranbrook and Exeter	106.4 (Exmouth); 106.1 (Ottery St Mary); 95.0 (Sidmouth); 94.6 (Cranbrook)			Small-scale DAB+	11 September 2006
Digital City Radio	Southend-on-Sea	103.7			Small-scale DAB+	1 April 2016
Diverse FM	Luton	102.8			Small-scale DAB+	April 2007
Dover Community Radio (DCR FM)	Dover	104.9			Small-scale DAB+	1 May 2022
Down Community Radio	Downpatrick	105.0				30 March 2006
Drive 105	Derry	105.3			Small-scale DAB+	27 January 2009
Drystone Radio	South Craven	102.0; 103.5			Small-scale DAB+	16 January 2009
Dunoon Community Radio	Dunoon	97.4				1 December 2009
East Coast FM	East Lothian	107.6				27 April 2013
EAVA FM	Leicester	102.5		Small-scale DAB		5 December 2008
Eden FM	Penrith, Cumbria	107.5				July 2014
Endeavour FM	Boston, Lincolnshire	107.0				22 August 2016
Erewash Sound	Ilkeston and Long Eaton	96.8; 103.5				6 March 2010
Express FM	Portsmouth	93.7			Small-scale DAB+	13 March 2006
103 The Eye	Melton Mowbray	103.0			Small-scale DAB+	1 November 2005
Raidió Fáilte	Belfast	107.1				15 September 2006
Fantasy Radio	Devizes	97.0			Small-scale DAB+	29 February 2012
Radio Faza	Nottingham	97.1			Small-scale DAB+	25 March 2002
Felixstowe Radio	Felixstowe	107.5				5 September 2009
Fiesta FM	Southampton	95.0			Small-scale DAB+	17 September 2018
First FM	Oxford	105.1				14 February 2014
Flex FM	South West London	101.4			Small-scale DAB+	1 July 2018
Radio Folkestone	Folkestone	105.9				31 March 2011
Forest FM	East Dorset	92.3 (Verwood); 98.9 (Ferndown)			Small-scale DAB+	4 July 2006
FromeFM	Frome	96.6				16 June 2012
Fuse FM Ballymoney	Ballymoney	107.5				6 July 2015
Future Radio	Norwich	107.8		Small-scale DAB	Small-scale DAB+	6 August 2007
Gateway 97.8	Basildon	97.8			Small-scale DAB+	28 August 2010
Gaydio	Greater London, Manchester and Brighton	88.4 (Manchester); 97.8 (Brighton)			11B (Greater London); Also on small-scale DAB+	18 June 2010
Glastonbury FM	Glastonbury	107.1				30 April 2009
Gloucester FM (GFM)	Gloucester	96.6				21 July 2006
GLOW Radio	Farnborough, Hampshire	106.5				May 2021
Great Driffield Radio	Driffield	95.2; 107.2				2 December 2018
GTFM	Pontypridd	95.7; 107.9; 100.2 (Mountain Ash, Rhondda Cynon Taf); 107.1 (Aberdare)			Small-scale DAB+	24 May 2002
Gulshan Radio	Wolverhampton and Dudley	106.9			Small-scale DAB+	11 February 2016
Hailsham FM	Hailsham	95.9				26 May 2018
Halton Community Radio	Runcorn	92.3				8 August 2008
Harborough FM (HFM)	Market Harborough	102.3				10 February 2007
Harbour Radio	Great Yarmouth	107.4				30 August 2017
Radio Hartlepool	Hartlepool and Redcar	102.4				14 October 2008
Hayes FM	Hayes, Hillingdon	91.8				1 September 2007
Heritage Radio	Manchester	90.6			Small-scale DAB+	5 June 2016
Hillz FM	Coventry, Nuneaton and Bedworth	98.6				1 June 2009
HitMix Radio	Newcastle-under-Lyme	107.5				28 November 2015
Home Radio	Glasgow, East Dunbartonshire and North Lanarkshire	100.8				4 May 2023
Hope FM	Bournemouth, Christchurch and Poole	90.1			Small-scale DAB+	1 May 2007
Horizon Radio	Northampton and Milton Keynes	104.7 (Northampton); 105.5 (Milton Keynes)			Small-scale DAB+	12 June 2021
Hot Radio	Dorset	102.8 (Poole)		Small-scale DAB	Small-scale DAB+	8 November 2008
Hull's 107FM	East Hull	107.4				6 February 2015
Humber Wave Radio	Kingston upon Hull	106.9			Small-scale DAB+	26 March 2007
Radio Ikhlas	Normanton, Derby	107.8				8 September 2006
In2beats	Bedford	106.5		Small-scale DAB		23 April 2011
Insanity Radio 103.2FM	Egham	103.2				8 March 2012
Inspiration FM	Northampton	107.8			Small-scale DAB+	24 July 2010
Inspire FM	Luton	105.1			Small-scale DAB+	10 August 2010
Ipswich Community Radio	Ipswich	105.7				15 August 2007
Irvine Beat FM	Irvine, North Ayrshire	107.2				12 August 2013
Islands FM	Isles of Scilly	107.9				3 September 2007
IÚR FM	Newry	101.4				10 October 2007
Jorvik Radio	York	94.8			Small-scale DAB+	4 November 2019
Juice Radio	Preston, Lancashire	103.2			Small-scale DAB+	6 October 2008
K107FM	Kirkcaldy	107.0				March 2014
Kane FM	Guildford	103.7				28 October 2011
KCC Live	Knowsley, Merseyside	99.8				1 December 2003
Keith Community Radio	Keith and Moray	107.7 – evening opt-out of MFR				January 2013
Kemet Radio	Nottingham	97.5				25 January 2007
Kennet Radio	Newbury, Berkshire	106.7				March 2018
Koast Radio	Ashington	106.6			Small-scale DAB+	December 2015
Kohinoor Radio FM	Leicester	97.3		Small-scale DAB	Small-scale DAB+	23 December 2008
Radio LaB 97.1FM	Luton	97.1				May 1997
LCR FM 103.6	Lincoln	103.6				19 April 2010
LDC Radio	Leeds	97.8			Small-scale DAB+	17 June 2020
Legacy 90.1 FM	Moss Side	90.1			Small-scale DAB+	1 October 2009
Leicester Community Radio	Leicester	94.1				2015
Radio Leyland	Leyland, Lancashire	104.8				1 April 2019
Link FM	Sheffield	96.7			Small-scale DAB+	February 2016
Lionheart Radio	Alnwick	107.3			Small-scale DAB+	30 March 2007
Maritime Radio	Greenwich	96.5			Small-scale DAB+	20 April 2019
Marlow FM	Marlow, Buckinghamshire	97.5				11 May 2011
Mearns FM	Stonehaven and South Aberdeenshire	105.1 (Portlethen); 105.7 (Stonehaven); 106.2 (Inverbervie); 107.3 (Laurencekirk)			Small-scale DAB+	6 June 2009
107 Meridian FM	East Grinstead	107.0				1 March 2010
Mid Sussex Radio	Burgess Hill	103.8				27 October 2018
Mix 92.6	St Albans	92.6			Small-scale DAB+	7 July 2007
MKFM	Milton Keynes	95.0 (Wolverton); 102.1 (Bletchley); 106.3 (Milton Keynes)			10D (Bedfordshire, Buckinghamshire and Hertfordshire)	7 September 2015
Môn FM	Anglesey and Gwynedd	96.8; 102.5				12 July 2014
Moorlands Radio	Staffordshire Moorlands	103.7; 97.3			Small-scale DAB+	7 November 2009
Nagrecha Radio	London Borough of Newham	92.0			Small-scale DAB+	19 March 2007
Nevis Radio	Fort William	96.6; 97.0; 102.3; 102.4; 103.3				1 August 1994 (On-air from 1994 as a commercial station until switching to a community licence in 2013)
Radio Newark	Newark-on-Trent	107.8			Small-scale DAB+	2 May 2015
Radio Ninesprings	Yeovil and South Somerset	104.5 (Yeovil and parts of West Dorset); 103.3 (Wincanton); 107.6 (Chard and Crewkerne)		Small-scale DAB		1 October 2018
NLive Radio	Northampton	106.9			Small-scale DAB+	1 October 2016
Nomad Radio	Hammersmith and Fulham	92.2				1 November 2019
North Manchester FM	North Manchester	106.6				6 July 2009
Nova FM	Newport, Shropshire	97.5				1 August 2015
Nova Radio North East	Newcastle upon Tyne	102.5			Small-scale DAB+	8 June 2007
Oldham Community Radio	Oldham	99.7			Small-scale DAB+	17 March 2007
Ouse Valley Radio	Huntingdon	104.0			Small-scale DAB+	23 April 2011
Outreach Gold	Hampshire		1557 (Borough of Eastleigh)		Small-scale DAB+	6 March 2026
Outreach Radio	Hampshire	102.5 (South Hampshire)			Small-scale DAB+	2020
Radio Panj	Coventry, Shirley and Solihull	99.6	1521	Small-scale DAB		December 2016
Park Radio	Diss, Eye, Harleston and Bungay	105.2 (Harleston and Bungay); 107.6 (Diss and Eye)				26 November 2017
Pendle Community Radio	Nelson, Lancashire	103.1				28 August 2007
Penistone FM	Penistone	95.7; 97.7				6 June 2009
Peterborough Community Radio (PCR FM)	Peterborough	103.2			Small-scale DAB+	14 April 2017
Phoenix FM	Brentwood, Essex	98.0			Small-scale DAB+	23 March 2007
Phoenix Radio	Halifax, West Yorkshire	96.7			Small-scale DAB+	10 December 2007
Phonic FM	Exeter	106.8			Small-scale DAB+	15 February 2008
Platform B	Brighton	105.5			Small-scale DAB+	1 October 2018
Radio Plus	Coventry, Nuneaton and Bedworth	101.5			Small-scale DAB+	20 December 2010
Pride Radio	Newcastle upon Tyne	89.2			Small-scale DAB+	9 July 2018
Pulse 98.4	Barrhead	98.4				28 July 2009
Quality Radio	Paisley, Renfrewshire	107.5			Small-scale DAB+	1 February 2019
QUAY-FM	Alderney, Channel Islands	107.1			12A (Channel Islands)	12 February 2015
Raaj FM	Sandwell and City of Birmingham	91.3				31 January 2009
Rainbow Radio	South London	92.4			Small-scale DAB+	August 2022
Radio Ramadhan 365	Glasgow	87.7				May 2019
Red Kite Radio	Thame and Haddenham	107.2				18 June 2017
Redroad FM	South Rotherham	102.4				27 March 2010
Reprezent	South London	107.3			Small-scale DAB+	18 March 2011
Resonance FM	London	104.4			Small-scale DAB+	1 May 2002
Radio Reverb	Brighton	97.2			Small-scale DAB+	26 March 2007
Revive FM	Newham	94.0				19 July 2019
Rhondda Radio	Treorchy	106.1; 97.5 (Ferndale, Rhondda Cynon Taf)			Small-scale DAB+	29 July 2018
Ribble FM	Clitheroe	106.7				25 July 2016
Rinse FM	London	106.8; 101.4			Small-scale DAB+	7 February 2011
Riviera FM	Torbay	107.9				1 April 2020
RNIB Connect Radio	Glasgow	101.0; Also on Freeview 730				30 March 2007
Rossendale Radio	Haslingden and Rawtenstall	104.7				22 December 2018
RWSfm 103.3	Bury St Edmunds	103.3				13 August 2010
Salaam Radio	Peterborough	106.2				30 June 2016
Salford City Radio	Salford	94.4				30 September 2007
Radio Saltire	East Lothian	106.7; 107.2			Small-scale DAB+	10 October 2011
Radio Sangam	Huddersfield	107.9; 94.7			Small-scale DAB+	8 May 2016
Seahaven FM	Seaford, Newhaven, Peacehaven and Eastbourne	96.3 (Seaford); 95.6 (Eastbourne)			Small-scale DAB+	9 January 2011
Seaside FM	Holderness	105.3; 103.5; 104.4				5 October 2007
Sedgemoor FM	Bridgwater	104.2				9 June 2013
Radio Seerah	Leicester		1575		Small-scale DAB+	1 February 2019
Select Radio	South London	94.4			Small-scale DAB+	3 December 2021
106.9 SFM	Sittingbourne	106.9			Small-scale DAB+	26 July 2012
Sheffield Live!	Sheffield	93.2			Small-scale DAB+	29 October 2007
Sheppey FM 92.2	Isle of Sheppey	92.2			Small-scale DAB+	18 April 2017
Shine 879	Essex				12D; Also on small-scale DAB+	26 February 2022
shmuFM	Aberdeen	99.8			Small-scale DAB+	17 March 2005
Sine FM	Doncaster	102.6			Small-scale DAB+	26 September 2009
Somer Valley FM	Midsomer Norton and Radstock	97.5		Small-scale DAB		12 January 2009
Soundart Radio	Totnes	102.5				17 December 2008
Sound Radio	Rhyl, Abergele and Prestatyn	103.1				8 February 2021
Source FM	Falmouth, Cornwall	96.1				28 February 2009
Spark Sunderland	Sunderland	107.0				26 October 2009
Speysound Radio	Badenoch and Strathspey	107.1				4 December 2009
Spice FM	Newcastle upon Tyne	98.8			Small-scale DAB+	8 August 2008
Sunny Govan Radio	Govan	103.5				28 March 2007
Sunshine 104.9	Belfast	104.9			Small-scale DAB+	January 2019
Susy Radio	Redhill and Reigate	103.4				15 July 2012
Swindon 105.5	Swindon	105.5			Small-scale DAB+	15 March 2008
Switch Radio	Birmingham	107.5			Small-scale DAB+	30 April 2010
Takeover Radio	Sutton-in-Ashfield	106.9				1 March 2010
Tameside Radio	Tameside	103.6				30 September 2007
Radio Tamworth	Tamworth, Staffordshire	106.8				31 October 2009
TD1 Radio	Galashiels	106.5				30 March 2015
Tempo FM	Wetherby	107.4		Small-scale DAB		11 September 2006
Thornbury Radio	South Gloucestershire	105.1; 107.5			Small-scale DAB+	21 June 2021
TMCR	North East Doncaster	95.3; 107.5			Small-scale DAB+	14 December 2009
Radio Tyneside	Newcastle upon Tyne	93.6			Small-scale DAB+	5 July 2018
Ujima Radio	Bristol	98.0		Small-scale DAB		4 July 2008
Unity 101	Southampton	101.1			Small-scale DAB+	8 December 2005
Unity FM	Birmingham	93.5			Small-scale DAB+	2 August 2006
Unity Radio	Manchester	92.8				Summer 2010
UWS Radio	Ayrshire			11B		2001
Vectis Radio	Newport, Isle of Wight	104.6			Small-scale DAB+	4 November 2017
Vibe 1	Stafford	107.3				25 April 2015
Vibe 107.6	Watford	107.6			Small-scale DAB+	8 August 2011
Vixen 101	Market Weighton	101.8; 103.1				10 January 2009
The Voice	North Devon, East Devon, Exeter and Torbay	106.1 (Barnstaple); 107.8 (Bideford and Ilfracombe)			10C (North Devon); 11C (East Devon, Exeter and Torbay)	2 April 2012
The Voice 2	North Devon, East Devon, Exeter and Torbay				10C (North Devon); 11C (East Devon, Exeter and Torbay)	9 April 2024
Voice FM	Southampton	103.9			Small-scale DAB+	1 September 2011
Warminster Community Radio (WCR)	Warminster	105.5			Small-scale DAB+	1 April 2012
WCR FM	Wolverhampton	101.8			Small-scale DAB+	30 March 2007
Welsh Coast Radio	Swansea	106.5			Small-scale DAB+	1 December 2008
West Kent Radio	West Kent	95.5 (Tonbridge); 106.7 (Royal Tunbridge Wells); 107.2 (Bidborough)			Small-scale DAB+	15 October 2021
Westside Radio	Hanwell	89.6			Small-scale DAB+	13 September 2007
West Somerset Radio	Minehead	104.4				22 October 2018
Radio Wimborne	Wimborne	94.6			Small-scale DAB+	16 October 2021
Radio Winchcombe	Winchcombe and Bishop's Cleeve	107.1 (Winchcombe and Cheltenham); 106.9 (Tewkesbury and Bishop's Cleeve)				18 May 2012
Winchester Radio	Winchester	94.7			Small-scale DAB+	24 March 2019
Wrexham City Radio	Wrexham	105.0			Small-scale DAB+	April 2025
WRFM	West Oxfordshire	90.2 (Charlbury, Witney and Woodstock); 99.9 (Witney); 105.3 (Eynsham and Oxford); 107.1 (Faringdon); 107.4 (Chipping Norton)		Small-scale DAB	Small-scale DAB+	16 June 2017
Wycombe Sound	High Wycombe	106.6				31 October 2016
Wythenshawe FM	Wythenshawe	97.2			Small-scale DAB+	6 May 2002
Radio Wyvern	Herefordshire and Worcestershire	106.7 (Worcester)		12A		13 January 2008
YO1 Radio	North Yorkshire	102.8 (York); 90.0 (Selby)			10C; Also on small-scale DAB+	27 August 2018
Zack FM	Forest Heath	105.3			Small-scale DAB+	22 June 2009
Zetland FM	Redcar	105.0			Small-scale DAB+	31 August 2015

== Former community radio stations ==
The following stations have closed down and returned their licences to Ofcom:

Name	Licence area	FM	AM	DAB	Date closed
An Radio	Uist	105.2			February 2019
Bangor FM	Bangor, County Down	107.9			27 June 2024
Betar Bangla	East London		1503		March 2020
BFBS Ballykinler	Ballykinler	107.5			4 August 2014 (due to closure of Abercorn Barracks)
Radio BGWS	Farnborough, Hampshire		1179		May 2019
Radio Blackburn 102.2 FM	Blackburn	102.2			2024
Boundary Sound	Newark-on-Trent	102.6			23 June 2011
Brecks FM	Watton, Norfolk	106.9			3 December 2017
Brick FM	St Boswells	103.0			December 2017
Buchan Radio	Peterhead	107.9			24 October 2022
Burngreave Community Radio	Burngreave	103.1			September 2011
Calon FM	Wrexham	105.0			September 2024
Carillon Wellbeing Radio	West Leicestershire		1476		31 March 2024
98.8 Castle FM	Leith and North Edinburgh	98.8			February 2016
Chelmsford Calling	Chelmsford	104.4			February 2007
Cheshire FM	Mid Cheshire	92.5			27 January 2012
Chorley FM	Chorley	102.8			1 August 2019
Cross Rhythms Teesside	Stockton-on-Tees	107.1			April 2019
Diversity FM	Lancaster, Lancashire	103.5			1 April 2012
Féile FM	Belfast	103.2			25 March 2011
Forest of Dean Radio	Cinderford		1521; 1503 (Newent)		31 December 2009
Radio Glan Clwyd	Bodelwyddan		1287		February 2019
Gravity FM	Grantham	97.2			March 2022
Hermitage FM	Coalville and Ashby-de-la-Zouch	99.2			31 March 2024
The Hub	Mid Cornwall	106.1 (Truro); 106.4 (St Mawes and Mevagissey)			28 October 2016
Iman FM	North East Sheffield and South West Rotherham	103.1			4 July 2017
Indigo FM	Kirkby Lonsdale	106.6			January 2015
Radio Jcom	Leeds		1386		November 2016
Leisure FM	Pattiswick	107.4			June 2022
Link FM	Harold Hill	92.2			28 June 2010
Lisburn's 98FM	Lisburn	98.8			June 2024
New Style Radio	Birmingham	98.7			2022
Oban FM	Oban	103.3			7 July 2024
ON FM	Hammersmith	101.4			January 2013
OX105 FM	Oxford	105.1			2 October 2013
The Park	Lymington	97.9			8 June 2012
Point FM	Rhyl	103.1			14 July 2017
Pulse	Cheddar, Somerset	104.4			July 2016
Purbeck Coast FM	Swanage	101.2			15 February 2024
Revival FM	Cumbernauld	100.8; 93.0 (Glasgow)			2025
Saint FM	Burnham-on-Crouch	94.7			April 2018
Radio Sandwell	Sandwell	106.9			November 2011
Shine FM	Banbridge	102.4			28 August 2015
Siren FM	Lincoln	107.3			30 June 2024
Skyline Gold Radio	South Hampshire	102.5			6 September 2024
Sound Radio	East London		1503		June 2007
Stroud FM	Stroud	107.9			12 February 2014
Radio Sunlight	Medway	106.6			19 February 2016
The Superstation Orkney	Orkney	105.4			16 November 2014
Takeover Radio	Leicester	103.2			2022
Radio Teesdale	Barnard Castle	105.5; 102.1 (Romaldkirk)			July 2016
TGR Sound	Bexleyheath	103.7			22 June 2008
Tone FM	Taunton	107.8			2025
Tulip Radio	Spalding, Lincolnshire	107.5			30 January 2017
Ummah FM	Reading, Berkshire	95.6			July 2016
Vibe FM	Enniskillen	105.3			October 2009
Voice of Africa Radio	Stratford, London	94.0			March 2016
Voice Radio	Caerphilly			11C (Cardiff and Newport)	20 July 2011
Wayland Radio	Wayland, Norfolk	107.3			27 August 2011
West Wolds Radio	Pocklington	103.1			30 September 2016
Radio Wirral	Wirral	92.1		10D	2021
XS	Neath and Port Talbot	97.4 (Neath); 107.9 (Port Talbot)			13 December 2011

== Restricted service licence stations ==
Temporary restricted service licence (RSL) stations are licensed by Ofcom and broadcast for up to 28 days. RSLs are used for a number of purposes including coverage of events and festivals, trial broadcasts by groups aiming to launch a full-time service, student radio and training projects and religious festivals including the Sikh festival Vaisakhi, the Muslim month of Ramadan, Jehovah's Witness conventions and Christian events such as Easter and Christmas.

The following list is a small selection of regular RSL stations which have been set up to cover various festivals and events across the UK:

Name	Licence area	Typical air dates	FM
Radio Airbourne	Eastbourne	August	87.7 – Live coverage of Eastbourne International Airshow
Radio Badminton	Badminton House	May	87.9 – Live coverage of Badminton Horse Trials
Radio Brands	Brands Hatch	Spring	88.3 – Coverage of Brands Hatch motor racing events
BSB Radio	Various race circuits	Spring / Summer	87.7 – Coverage of British Superbike Championship
Cheltenham Radio	Cheltenham Racecourse	March	87.7 – Coverage of Cheltenham Racecourse horse racing events
Radio Cosford	RAF Cosford	June	87.9 – Live coverage of Cosford Air Show
Cowes Radio	Cowes	August	87.7 – Live coverage of Cowes Week
Open Golf Radio	Varies	July	87.7 – Coverage of the Open Golf Championship
Radio Ramadan	Up to 29 local RSLs across the UK	During period of Ramadan and Eid	87.7
Radio Silverstone	Silverstone Circuit	July	87.7 – Live coverage of the British Grand Prix
Radio Wimbledon	Wimbledon, London	June / July	87.7 – Live coverage of Wimbledon Tennis Championships with Centre Court commentary on 96.3 FM and Number One court commentary on 97.8 FM
Radio WOMAD	Malmesbury	July	87.7 – Live coverage of the WOMAD music festival
Worthy FM	Glastonbury	June	87.7 – Live coverage of the Glastonbury Festival

== Student radio stations ==
Most universities plus a number of colleges operate student radio stations with the vast majority only available online. The Student Radio Association represents around 65 student stations.

The following stations are available via an FM community licence or via LPFM transmitters:

Name	Licence area	FM
Bailrigg FM	Lancaster University	95.3 – LPFM
Cam FM	University of Cambridge and Anglia Ruskin University	See community radio listings
Fresh FM	Petroc, Barnstaple	87.7 – LPFM
Insanity Radio 103.2FM	Royal Holloway, University of London	See community radio listings
Radio LaB 97.1FM	University of Bedfordshire	See community radio listings
Source FM	Falmouth University	See community radio listings
Spark Sunderland	University of Sunderland	See community radio listings
University Radio York	University of York	88.3 – LPFM

== Hospital radio stations ==
Typically available within the grounds of a single hospital, these stations broadcast to bedside units and occasionally public areas of the hospital. Hospital radio is free of charge on bedside entertainment systems operated by Hospedia and Premier Bedside and an increasing number of stations are available online.

Around 200 stations are supported by the Hospital Broadcasting Association (HBA).

The following stations are available via LPAM or LPFM transmitters or as Ofcom licensed community stations:

Name	Licence area	FM	AM	DAB	DAB+
AHBS Community Radio	William Harvey Hospital, Ashford, Kent	See community radio listings			
Anker Radio	George Eliot Hospital, Nuneaton	88.9 – LPFM	1386 – LPAM		
Apple FM	Musgrove Park Hospital, Taunton	See community radio listings			
Radio BGM	Prince Philip Hospital, Llanelli	94.9 – LPFM			
BHR 107.3	Basildon University Hospital	107.3 – LPFM			
Bridge FM Hospital Radio	Ninewells Hospital and Royal Victoria Hospital, Dundee	87.7 – LPFM		11B (Mon-Fri 1200-1400, Sun-Thu 1800-0000)	
Radio Bronglais	Bronglais Hospital, Aberystwyth	87.8 – LPFM			
Radio Cavell	Royal Oldham Hospital		1350 – LPAM		
CHBN Radio	Royal Cornwall Hospital, Truro	See community radio listings			
Chichester Hospital Radio	St Richard's Hospital, Chichester		1431 – LPAM		
Radio City 1386AM	Singleton Hospital, Swansea		1386 – LPAM		
Classic Hits Forest Radio	St Margaret's Hospital, Epping	99.3 – LPFM			Small-scale DAB+
Radio Clatterbridge	Clatterbridge Hospital, Wirral		1386 – LPAM		
Harrogate Hospital Radio	Harrogate District Hospital	95.3 – LPFM		Small-scale DAB	
Hospital Radio Medway	Medway Maritime Hospital, Gillingham, Kent	97.0 – LPFM			
Mid Downs Radio	Princess Royal Hospital, Haywards Heath		1350 – LPAM		
Radio Mount Vernon	Mount Vernon Hospital, Northolt	95.1 – LPFM			
Hospital Radio Plymouth	Derriford Hospital, Plymouth	107.3 – LPFM			Small-scale DAB+
Radio Redhill	East Surrey Hospital, Redhill, Surrey	100.4 – LPFM	1431 – LPAM		
Stoke Mandeville Hospital Radio	Stoke Mandeville Hospital	101.8 – LPFM			
Torbay Hospital Radio	Torbay Hospital, Torquay	95.9 – LPFM			
Radio Tyneside	Freeman Hospital and Royal Victoria Infirmary, Newcastle upon Tyne and Queen Elizabeth Hospital, Gateshead	See community radio listings			

== Television radio stations ==
Stations which are broadcast to the UK via satellite, cable and digital terrestrial television:

Name	Format	Sky	Freesat	Virgin	Freeview
EWTN Radio	Catholic religious station	0135			
RTÉ Radio 1	News, current affairs, sport and music	0131	750	917	
RTÉ 2fm	Pop music	0132	751		
RTÉ Raidió na Gaeltachta	Irish-language programming	0134	753		729 (Northern Ireland)
RTÉ Lyric FM	Classical music and jazz	0133	752		
WRN Europe	Programming from international broadcasters	0120	728	920	

== LPAM and LPFM stations ==
Name	Licence area	LPFM	LPAM	DAB+
Acacia Radio	Kirkby-in-Ashfield		1287	
BFBS Gurkha Radio	Various army camps	90.8 (Dover); 101.4 (Leconfield); 101.5 (Blandford Forum); 104.4 (Holywood, County Down); 105.4 (Shorncliffe); 106.8 (Woodbridge, Suffolk)	1134 (Bramcote, Bulford, Catterick and Sandhurst); 1278 (Shorncliffe, Stafford and Tidworth); 1287 (Aldershot, Brecon, Hullavington, Innsworth, Maidstone and Warminster)	Small-scale DAB+
Brill Oldies Radio	Brill, Buckinghamshire	104.7		
Radio Mi Amigo	Harwich		1575	
Nitro FM	Santa Pod Raceway, Northamptonshire	96.2 (motor sport meetings only)		
Scout Radio	Gilwell Park, London	99.6		

== Frequencies ==
To conserve space in the listings, the waveband has not been listed after each frequency, but they are easy to tell apart.

- Whole numbers always refer to a kHz (AM) frequency – i.e. 999 = 999 kHz.
- Decimal numbers always refer to a MHz (FM) frequency – i.e. 96.2 = 96.2 MHz.
- A number and letter combination refers to a DAB channel – i.e. 12C = frequency block 12C on 227.360 MHz.

== See also ==
- Radio in the United Kingdom
- Digital radio in the United Kingdom
- Radio in the Republic of Ireland
- List of Celtic-language media
- List of DAB multiplexes in the United Kingdom
