= Beyond Radio =

- Lancaster and Morecambe; England
- Broadcast area: North West Lancashire
- Frequency: FM: 103.5, 107.5 MHz (North Lancashire)

Programming
- Format: Community Radio

Ownership
- Owner: Proper Community Media (Lancaster) Ltd.

History
- First air date: 30 July 2016

Technical information
- Transmitter coordinates: 54.0453°N 2.7820°W

Links
- Website: beyondradio.co.uk

Beyond Radio is a local radio station based in Lancaster, Lancashire, England. The parent company (Proper Community Media (Lancaster) Ltd.) was awarded a Community Radio broadcast license by Ofcom in 2014 and launched at 10:35 am on Saturday 30 July 2016; the time 10:35 was chosen to reflect the station's FM frequency. Following an online social media poll the first track played was 'The Boys Are Back in Town' by Thin Lizzy.

== History ==
Beyond Radio replaced the former community radio station Diversity FM which ceased broadcasting in April 2012. It was founded in May 2012 and streamed an online service before going live on FM in 2016.

The station serves a potential audience of around 140,000 people in and around the district.

On 12 September 2020, an additional transmitter for Carnforth on 107.5 MHz FM was turned on.

In March 2021 the station announced that they had received a five year license extension from regulator Ofcom that means the station will be authorised to broadcast under current license conditions until at least July 2026.

== Studio ==
The studios are located in the Bowerham/Scotforth area of Lancaster in a former disused bowling pavilion. The building was in a state of disrepair and was renovated by members of the station's board and volunteer group to bring the building back to life. Now the building houses two broadcast studios, a production area and a live room with recording facilities.

== Activities ==
The station is run by a team of volunteers who present programmes, maintain the studios and help run events amongst other things.

One of the station's aims is to build community in the Lancaster and Morecambe District. In 2018 it formed an alliance with local Facebook group 'Lancaster Past and Present' in order to enhance its coverage of local events and information.

== Transmission ==
The station broadcasts at 100 W ERP on the frequency of 103.5 MHz FM from the top of the Ashton Memorial (SD 488 613) at a height of 40 m AGL. There is an FM relay transmitter in Carnforth on 107.5 MHz with an ERP of 20 W.
