= Lionheart Radio =

Coordinates: 55.41386°N 1.70807°W

- Alnwick; England
- Broadcast area: Northumberland
- Frequency: 107.3 MHz

Programming
- Format: AC / CHR / Dance (with a community focus)

Ownership
- Owner: Alnwick Community Development Trust (Licence Holder) // Lionheart Radio and Media CIC (Operator)

History
- First air date: 30 March 2007

Links
- Website: www.lionheartradio.com

Lionheart Radio is a community radio station in the north east of England which broadcasts to Northumberland from Fenkle Street in Alnwick. It conducted three and a half months of successful restricted service licence (RSL) broadcasts and was awarded a community licence by Ofcom (the Office of Communications) in November 2005.

The first 28-day restricted service licence broadcast was in June 2003, and was the first broadcast of its kind in the Alnwick district. It was founded and coordinated in partnership by Peter Duddy, and district councillor Kevin Thompson. The project is volunteer-based and the programme content is locally oriented using local producers and interviewees and discussing local issues daily.

In 2004 Lionheart Radio came under the wing of Alnwick Community Development Trust, which was founded in 2000 to identify and develop projects to meet the various needs of the local community in Alnwick, in order to benefit from the Trust's charitable status.

The project team at Lionheart Radio proposed to Ofcom that a new community interest company be permitted to take over the day-to-day running of the station. This was successfully created as Lionheart Radio and Media CIC in early 2007.

Lionheart Radio began studio installation in February 2007 and started test transmissions on 30 March 2007, with a formal launch in June 2007. It started as a volunteer presenter on the first RSL in 2003.

Lionheart Radio exists to offer locals of all ages the opportunity of getting involved in radio, and give people the chance to make a difference to the town of Alnwick.

== See also ==
- Ofcom
- List of radio stations in the United Kingdom
