= Fuse FM Ballymoney =

Radio station in Ulster, Northern Ireland

Coordinates: 55°04′06″N 6°31′03″W

fUSe FM Ballymoney (For Ulster Scots Enthusiasts) is the first Ulster Scots community radio station in the UK and is currently run under the Ullans Speakers Association. Broadcasting on FM 107.5, online and via the TuneIn app from their studio based in Ballymoney, Co. Antrim, Northern Ireland, within the Fuse Centre.

== History ==
In 2007 a small group of individuals formed a group known back then as the ‘North Antrim Events and Media’ group. One of the first projects undertaken by the group was a new concept proposed by the Ulster Scots Agency, an Ulster-Scots radio station, to be known as fUSe fm (For Ulster-Scots Enthusiast's).

The group's 1st broadcast was very basic, broadcasting out of Ballymoney Orange hall. Back at this stage all the music was played off CD's with no modern technologies running the stations broadcast. One of the driving features behind the station was that the programing was broadcast by local folk speaking in Ulster-Scots and the listener's ability to text the station and presenters directly for all their song requests and shout outs, a feature which still exists today.

The group quickly realised their broadcast was popular and made plans to repeat its success the following year with another two short RLS last 4 weeks each again supported by the Ulster Scots Agency.

At the same time another group was being formed called the ‘Ullans Speakers Association’ who planned to open a language and cultural centre in the town. With funding, yet again from the Ulster Scots Agency, the Ullans Speakers Association opened the Ullans Centre in Victoria Street. Within this centre a new comfortable purpose build broadcast studio was constructed on the first floor which allowed fUSe fm now to have a permanent base along with a change in name from North Antrim Events and Media to fUSe fm Ballymoney.

New up to date equipment was purchased allowing the station more independence and the ability to train while the station was not broadcasting which saw fUSe fm becoming more and more professional with each new broadcast. The new studio also gave the group the ability to broadcast the station online reaching even more listeners not just around Northern Ireland, or indeed the Uk but right across the world with messages of support being received from America on several occasions. fUSe fm was also able to broadcast to local lads who were on tours of duty in Iraq and Afghanistan which various regiments, allowing them to hear a taste of home in the middle of these war zones.

2012 brought bigger challenges and new opportunities to the station in the form of an invitation to apply for a full-time Community Radio licence. Part of this process saw the transition of the Ullans Speakers Association from a simple organisation to a private limited company and registered NI charity, of which fUSe fm become a part of in order to hold a community radio licence.

By this time the centre had outgrown their premises and in October 2013 made the move to a bigger place situated at the bottom of the town. The studio was built just in time for our now annual Christmas broadcast, with a modern station in mind and to a high quality making it future proof for the upcoming full-time station. fUSe fm continued in 2014 with two further short RSL at both summer and Christmas while at the same time working towards putting measures in place to start broadcasting full-time. The OFCOM licence award had been for 5 years, but the group had 2 of these years to launch. Unfortunately several issues put the launch date behind launching, this has been mostly due to a dispute regarding the frequency between OFCOM and the Irish regulators, something totally out of the group's hands. fUSe fm had hoped to launch 1 June but this date had to be proposed and a new date set.

Thankfully the station received formal clearance in May 2015 and with the new antenna now installed and commissioning by OFCOM, fUSe fm Ballymoney set a new launch date for 6 July at 9am, kicking off with the popular Breakfast Show on their new frequency 107.5 fm.

== Key Commitments ==
Licence No: CR100061

STATION NAME	fUSe FM
COMMUNITY TO BE SERVED	The Ulster Scots population and wider community of Ballymoney and surrounding areas
LICENCE AREA	Ballymoney and surrounding areas of North Antrim, Northern Ireland
FREQUENCY	107.5fm

=== Character Of Service ===
fUSe FM provides a broadcasting service reflecting the traditions, language and culture of Ulster Scots. The station provides a truly local radio service for the Ulster Scots community and the wider population of Ballymoney and the surrounding areas, providing entertainment, education and information for the community, from the community.

=== Programming ===
•fUSe FM features the voices of local people from the Ballymoney and wider Ulster Scots community in the North Antrim area of Northern Ireland.

•fUSe FM has a diverse range of speech based programming including programming to facilitate the promotion and showcasing of the local Ulster Scots talent.

•Speech content includes local news, ‘What’s on’ information, documentary and local history programmes, interviews, phone in discussions, studio debates, community messages and input from listeners by text and email. Speech based programming includes interviews for example with local Ulster Scots personalities, Ulster Scots artists/musicians, and local Ballymoney people/community groups; features such as Ulster Scots storytelling and poetry, and the promotion of local community events and wider Ulster Scots events across Northern Ireland.

•Music forms a large part of the output, with Ulster Scots music and specialist music programmes for example jazz, blues, charts, 80s-00s, country, classic rock, soul and classical music. Live broadcasts will occasionally feature output from local music venues and Ulster Scots festivals.

•Daytime programmes are mostly live and locally produced, with some automation during off peak times and overnight. Some specialist music programmes and local events may be pre-recorded.

•Studio location: this is in the proposed coverage area.

=== Social Gain and Other Commitments ===
•fUSe FM provides a platform for dialogue and discussion.

•As well as an outlet for Ulster Scots cultural, linguistic and artistic Scots expression, fUSe FM provides an outlet for the Ulster Scots community to promote their work and educate those in the area about Ulster Scots culture and traditions.

• Through links with jobcentres, schools, colleges and businesses, employment opportunities are publicised on a regular basis.

=== Participation in Service ===
•The fUSe FM directors and management committee ensure the station's open door policy is implemented for those wishing to be involved with the station.

•The management committee engages with the various Ulster Scots groups and wider community/voluntary sector to encourage active engagement

•Audience engagement is at the core of daily and weekly scheduling – with time given to audience interactivity and audience participation including a cross section of the local community taking into account age, gender, culture etc.

•The community as a whole is encouraged to take part in fUSe FM for example as programme contributors, programme makers, presenters or in some other capacity on a voluntary basis. Volunteering opportunities are a key part of the service.

=== Access to Facilities and Training ===
•fUSe FM's facilities may be used by groups wishing to acquire the necessary skills to communicate effectively through radio. Broadcast training courses are provided to members of the local community, and are promoted on air and through the station website.

•fUSe FM operates a work experience scheme four times a year

=== Accountability ===
•The station's Management Committee and associated audience advisory panel/sub-committee (made up of members of the public) are mechanisms to ensure accountability to the target community.

•Comments and opinions are welcomed through a variety of avenues, including by phone, email, the station website and through a local steering group/sub-committee established to gather opinion. Feedback from the community is considered by station management in the first instance, and then referred to the Board.

•Annual surveys involving a representative sample of listeners ask for feedback regarding the station's performance, the results of which are published on the station's website and mentioned on air.

•The station has in place complaints and grievance procedures which are available on the station's website.
