= Matryoshka Radio =

Russian-language radio station in the UK

Matryoshka Radio London
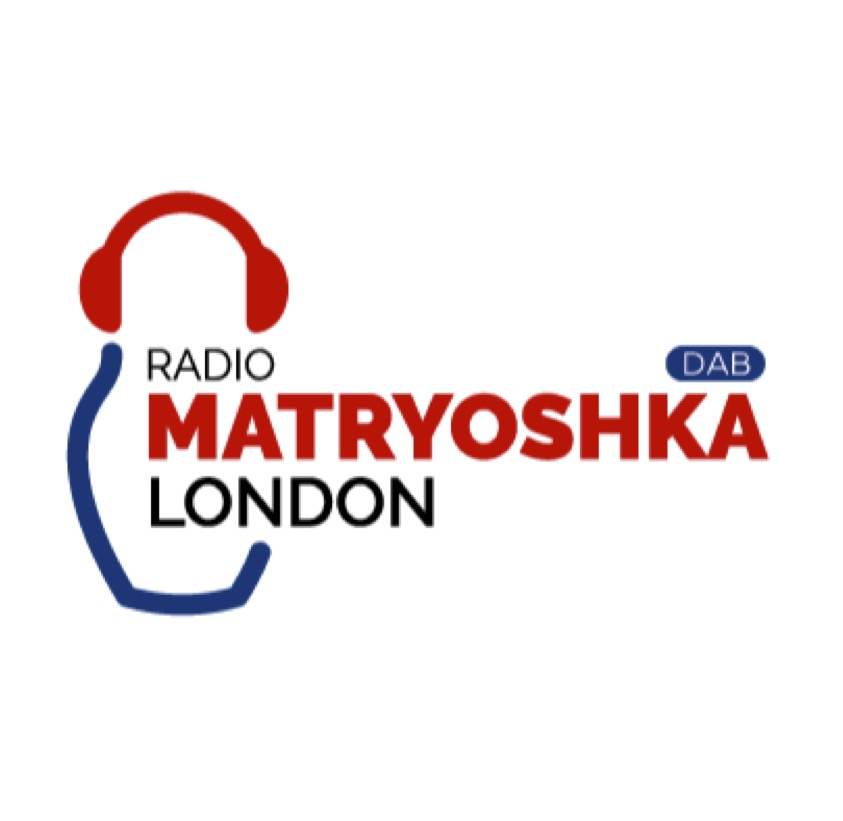
- London; England
- Broadcast area: Greater London
- Frequency: DAB: 11B

Programming
- Language: Russian

History
- First air date: 27 November 2015

Links
- Website: matryoshka.fm

Matryoshka Radio London is an independent commercial music radio station. On air 24/7, Matryoshka Radio London is the first Russian language radio station to have secured a British broadcasting licence. It has been broadcasting on digital audio broadcasting (DAB) in London since 27 November 2015.

Matryoshka's logo represents a stylised matryoshka doll sporting headphones and the name of the station, Matryoshka Radio London, as well as the technology it broadcasts in, DAB.
