= Stroud FM =

- England
- Broadcast area: Stroud, Gloucestershire.
- Frequency: 107.9 MHz FM

Programming
- Format: Local News, Talk, Music, Sport

Ownership
- Owner: Independent not-for-profit constituted group

History
- First air date: 24 March 2008
- Last air date: 12 February 2014

Stroud FM was a community radio station based in Stroud, Gloucestershire, which broadcast from March 2008 to February 2014 on 107.9 FM and online via its website.

It was launched on 24 March 2008, having produced live radio covering the Stroud Fringe Festival many years before. The station ran as a not-for profit organisation.

In March 2010, Labour MP David Drew officially opened a new second studio at the station.

In June 2011, the station launched a 'listen again' podcast service. In September 2011 the station announced it was close to closure because of financial issues. Local donations subsequently allowed it to stay on the site.

Plans were formed at the start of 2013 to increase the broadcasting range of the station by developing a new location for a transmitter.

On 12 February 2014, it was announced by their newly elected board that the station could no longer broadcast due to a lack of funding.
