= Vibe 1 =

- Stafford, Staffordshire; United Kingdom
- Frequency: 107.3 MHz
- RDS: Vibe 1

Programming
- Format: Community radio

History
- Founded: 2001
- First air date: 25 April 2015
- Former names: XL FM; Stafford FM

Technical information
- ERP: 25 watts

Links
- Website: www.vibe1.uk

Vibe 1 is a local community radio station serving Mid Staffordshire. It broadcasts on 107.3 FM to Stafford, Stone, Eccleshall, Penkridge and online. The station was one of two to apply in 2014 for an FM community radio licence to cover Stafford, and on 3 October 2014 they were awarded the licence to broadcast from 24 April 2015.

== History ==
=== 2011–2012 ===
Stafford FM emerged as a community station in 2011, launching online, based in studios on Marston Road, Stafford. While at the Marston Road studios, the station held three RSL licences, using a transmitter at Hopton . This was in an attempt to gain a community radio licence for the town.

=== XL FM ===
As a result of having to leave the studio building in December 2012, Stafford FM went off air for a time, until, on Sunday 3 February 2013, the station re-launched as XL FM. This was branded under a re-structuring, and the station promised a variety of shows and a wide range of music. However, it was announced on 19 August 2013 that the station would revert to its original name.

=== Stafford FM ===
On 25 April 2015, Stafford FM launched on 107.3 FM

=== Vibe 1 ===
On 22 April 2024, the station rebranded to Vibe 1, to embrace the wider Mid Staffordshire areas of Stone, Eccleshall, Gnosall and Penkridge, and the growing digital market.
