= Radio LaB 97.1FM =

Student radio station in Bedfordshire, England

Coordinates: 51.87777°N 0.41138°W

- Luton; England
- Broadcast area: Bedfordshire

Programming
- Language: English
- Affiliations: University of Bedfordshire

History
- First air date: May 1997
- Former names: Luton FM (1997-2010)

Links
- Webcast: https://radio.canstream.co.uk:9043/live.mp3
- Website: radiolab.beds.ac.uk

Radio LaB 97.1FM, formerly Luton FM, is a student radio station, managed, produced and presented by students at the Luton town centre campus of the University of Bedfordshire in Luton, Bedfordshire (formerly known as the University of Luton). Radio LaB stands for Radio Luton and Bedfordshire. It is now a full-time radio station with a community licence.

== History ==
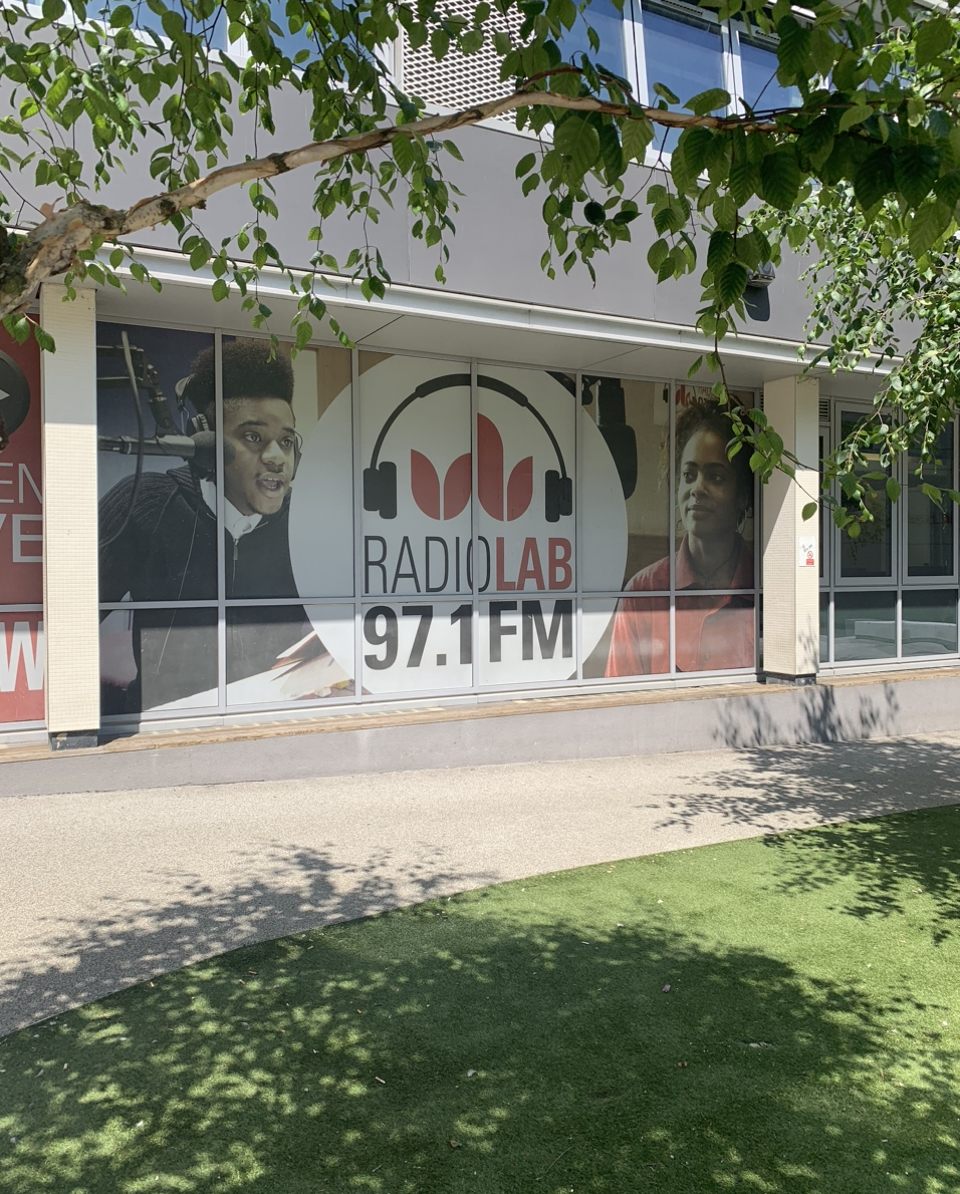
Outside of station

Radio LaB started its initial broadcast in May 1997. It was founded by Janey Gordon.

When the station started, it was called Luton FM. Each year throughout May, the station broadcasts on 87.9FM from a transmitter in Farley Hill, Luton. The studio and production area were based in the School of Media, Art and Design within the Luton campus of the University of Bedfordshire. Luton FM also broadcasts on the internet from the station's website.

In 2001, the station was broadcast online for the first time, and started the careers of many radio professionals of today.

The Luton FM website in 2003 became a major tool in promoting the station as it was the second year that the station was streamed online for the duration of its 28-day restricted service licence (RSL). In September 2004, Luton FM broadcast online for the first time outside its usual May remit.

In 2008, Luton FM changed its name and relaunched LaB Radio (Luton and Bedfordshire Radio), incorporating Luton and Bedfordshire. In 2009, the station changed its name to Radio LaB and underwent a major rebranding. Due to the station's success this year, 2009 was the last year of the station's twelve-year stretch as an RSL station, as Ofcom awarded the station a five-year full-time community licence starting in January 2010.

In 2010, the station name was changed to Radio LaB, and it broadcast on the internet. Since then, the station has held a community licence and broadcasts to Luton and across Bedfordshire. In 2011, after the new Campus Centre was completed, the studio was moved to a new studio in the Student Centre at the Luton campus of the University of Bedfordshire. Radio LaB now broadcasts from here 24/7.

In October 2014, Ofcom granted Radio LaB a five-year community radio licence extension, allowing the station to continue to broadcast on 97.1FM until April 2020. In March 2020, this was further extended by Ofcom until April 2025.

In September 2023, the station applied for the small-scale DAB licence to broadcast in Luton. Ofcom awarded the licence in June 2024.

== Personnel ==
Final-year students manage the station, and their final university grade is based on their performance in organising, promoting, and running Radio LaB. However, the final responsibility for running the station rests with Radio LaB Coordinator Terry Lee, who is the overall licensee for Radio LaB.

== Alumni ==
Past Luton FM managers/presenters include:

- Melvin Odoom and Rickie Haywood Williams, the award-winning morning presenters of Kiss 100 London

== Recognition ==
Radio LaB won Community Radio Awards in 2017, 2019, and 2020 (twice).

== See also ==
- Three Counties Radio
