= Bute Island Radio =

Coordinates: 55°50′11″N 5°3′11″W

- Rothesay; Scotland
- Broadcast area: Isle of Bute
- Frequency: 96.5 MHz
- RDS: BUTE96.5

Programming
- Format: Community info & mixed music

Ownership
- Owner: Bute Community Media Limited

History
- First air date: 15 July 2009 (as Bute FM); 16 March 2015 (as Bute Island Radio)

Links
- Website: www.buteislandradio.com

Bute Island Radio (formerly Bute FM) is a Community Radio station for the Isle of Bute, broadcasting in stereo on 96.5 FM and simultaneously broadcasting online via a live internet stream.

For almost 100 hours per week the station broadcasts programmes produced by volunteer presenters, with the remaining airtime (broadcasting) occupied by an automated music playout system. The station operates on a not-for-profit basis for the benefit of the community, and is dependent on advertising, local fundraising and donations for its continued existence.

== Programming ==
Bute FM broadcasts a wide range of musical styles, including pop, blues, jazz, country, rock and heavy metal; with music from every decade since the 1950s. The programme schedule includes daily breakfast, mid-morning and lunchtime shows each weekday, with a range of individual music and specialist programmes in the afternoons and evenings.

== History ==
Bute FM launched at noon on 15 July 2009, with the first song played on the new station's opening programme being "I Want to See the Bright Lights Tonight" by Richard and Linda Thompson, hosted by former Buteman reporter Mike Blair. In October 2009, Bute FM also launched an online "Listen live" streaming service, accessible from a button on its homepage, and is now also in the Reciva database for Internet radios. Over time, a "bitter feud" developed, leading to the August 2010 "sacking" of director and breakfast show presenter Mike Blair, followed by 12 other volunteers.

Subsequently, several "claims" were made in the national press and complaints were made to regulator Ofcom. In November, Ofcom said it was still minded to find the station in breach of its licence because of the late appearance of the committee and in December 2010 Ofcom ruled that Bute Community Media were in breach of their licence for not being accountable to their target community. BCM had never created a Community Focus Group, and the Steering Group had never had members who were not also directors of the company despite this having been "agreed with the licensee before the station [started] broadcasting" when Mike Blair was a director.

It was reported on Thursday 26 September 2013 that Bute FM had entered into merger discussions with a Bute-based internet-only radio station, whose members "decided not to proceed" because they "did not feel...[it] was possible in the current circumstances". Within 24 hours, Alan Donald had his "appointment as a Director of Bute Community Media Limited...terminated with immediate effect" according to the station's managing director.

On 24 April 2014, Bute FM announced via their Facebook page that they had attained their Ofcom Broadcast License for five more years, giving Bute FM on-air status until July 2019.

On 16 March 2015, Bute FM and the online station "Radio Bute" announced a merger, creating Bute Island Radio, which broadcasts on FM and online.
