= Radio Teesdale =

Coordinates: 54.5535°N 1.92226°W

Barnard Castle, County Durham, England; England
- Broadcast area: Teesdale
- Frequencies: 102.1 and 105.5 MHz

Ownership
- Owner: Teesdale Community Broadcasting Limited

Radio Teesdale was a community radio station in Barnard Castle, County Durham, serving the Teesdale area of England and owned and operated by Teesdale Community Broadcasting Limited, a not-for-profit community group.

Radio Teesdale could be heard on FM radio on the frequencies 102.1 and 105.5 MHz in the Teesdale area.
