= Point FM =

Rhyl; Wales
- Broadcast area: Rhyl, Prestatyn, St Asaph and surrounding areas
- Frequency: 103.1 MHz

Programming
- Format: Community: music and talk

Ownership
- Owner: Radio Elwy Point FM Ltd

History
- First air date: 27 March 2010
- Last air date: 14 July 2017

Point FM was a community radio station serving northern Denbighshire and eastern parts of Conwy County Borough in North Wales. Owned and operated by Radio Elwy Ltd, the station broadcast locally on 103.1 FM and online.

Point FM's programming largely consisted of music and talk output alongside local news features and information, specialist music output, sports coverage and live event outside broadcasts with automated music during non-programming hours. Apart from national news bulletins produced by Sky News Radio, most of the station's output was produced and presented locally.

After being awarded an FM community licence by OFCOM in 2008, the station was initially based at the Morville Hotel on Rhyl's East Parade before moving to temporary studios at Ffirth Beach in Prestatyn, and in July 2012, permanent studios and offices on Wellington Road in West Rhyl.

== Demise ==
In March 2017, it was reported that Point FM was facing a winding-up petition by PPL for non-payment of licence fees to play music on-air and an unresolved small claims judgement.

In July 2017, the High Court ruled in favour of PPL and Point FM was placed into compulsory liquidation. The station ceased broadcasting shortly after the winding up order was issued. In October 2017, OFCOM announced that the station had surrendered its FM licence.

The regulator advertised a new FM community licence for the Vale of Clwyd, Kinmel Bay and Abergele areas in December 2018. Four applications were received, although only three were considered.

In December 2019, OFCOM awarded the FM licence to Sound Radio, based in Towyn. The station, which launched online during the autumn of 2017, began broadcasting on 103.1 FM at 7am on Monday 8 February 2021.
