= Radio Tamworth =

England
- Broadcast area: Tamworth
- Frequencies: 106.9 FM (2005–2009), 106.8 FM (2009–present)

Programming
- Format: Community Radio

Ownership
- Owner: Tamworth Radio Broadcasting CIC

History
- First air date: 31 October 2009

Links
- Website: www.radiotamworth.com

Radio Tamworth is a community radio station, broadcasting to Tamworth, Staffordshire. The station is based at Tamworth Youth Centre, and is run entirely by volunteers.

The station can be heard on 106.8 FM in Tamworth, and online through its website.

== History ==
TCR fm was set up in 2005 and first broadcast in the summer of that year on a 28-day Restricted Service Licence (RSL) on the frequency of 106.9 FM from Saturday 30 July until Friday 26 August. The group then went on to host another RSL in the summer of 2007.

After completing the RSL in 2007, the directors at the time, Daniel Hoult and Martin Summers, went on to apply for a 5-year Community Radio Licence which they were awarded by OFCOM in May 2008. TCR fm started broadcasting on this licence on 31 October 2009, with a start time of 5pm, on a new frequency of 106.8 FM.

In December 2010, Ofcom found TCR fm in breach of its licence commitment to produce 12 hours of live programming per day. The station struggled to fulfil the hours due to volunteer availability with live hours varying with an uneven spread. In April 2011, with the agreement of Ofcom, the station was granted a change to the licence commitment to reflect the nature of the service, and the availability of volunteers.

== Rebrand to Radio Tamworth ==
TCR fm announced on 19 October 2017 that it was going to close on Sunday 22 October, due to a lack of available funding and number of voluntary presenters. However, it was announced a couple of days later on 23 October that the station had avoided closure and "A brand new sound is coming to 106.8 FM with a fresh team bringing an exciting sound for community radio in Tamworth". Radio Tamworth launched on 1 December 2017.
