= Waves Radio =

Former radio station in Peterhead

Coordinates: 57.5134°N 1.8087°W

- Peterhead; Scotland
- Broadcast area: Aberdeenshire
- Frequency: 101.2 MHz

Programming
- Format: Current and classic hits

Ownership
- Owner: Waves Radio Limited

History
- First air date: 6 December 1997
- Last air date: April 2023

Links
- Website: Waves Radio at the Wayback Machine (archived 24 August 2022)

Waves Radio was an Independent Local Radio station based in Peterhead, Scotland, with coverage across Peterhead and Fraserburgh on 101.2 FM.

== History ==
Waves Radio was born in 1990 after its founder and owner, known as Kenny King, applied to the then Radio Authority for a Restricted Service Licence. The station, in the early years, was known as Waves AM, broadcasting from a studio at the Lido beach area in Peterhead, during the town's annual Scottish Week celebrations.

Following the success of the initial broadcasts the station returned every summer, with the introduction of additional broadcasts made over the Christmas periods in 1994 and 1995. The station ceased broadcasting in July 1996 and was unable to transmit over the festive period due to the announcement of the full-time licence. After gaining a full-time licence, Waves Radio launched on 6 December 1997, from studios at Blackhouse Circle and transmitter at Mormond Hill.

In early summer 2021, the station's existing management announced plans to retire and a new consortium gained control of the station. The takeover was short lived, with the previous management returning in August 2021. A further takeover bid concluded later on the same year, with a group headed by Preston-based businessman Neil Stafford gaining control of the station.

In April 2023, it was announced that the station had ceased broadcasting on DAB, with online streaming following suit. Companies House reported that accounts for the year to end 30 June 2022 were overdue.

=== Coast Radio ===
In April 2024, Ofcom announced that the license had been transferred to WBC Media CIC and would operate under the name Coast Radio. Coast Radio started broadcasting at 10:12 am on 26 May 2024.

On 27 November 2025 the station announced that it would cease broadcasting at midnight on Sunday, 30 November 2025.

== Programming ==
Local programming was produced and broadcast from Waves Radio's studios from 6am-10am most days, with syndicated programming including Totally 80s, Totally 90s and The World Chart.

The station's local presenters included Glenn Moir, Duncan McKay and Kevin Murdoch.

== News and sport ==
National bulletins were formerly provided by Sky News Radio, supplemented with local bulletins at 8.30am, 12.30pm and 5.30pm
