= AHBS Community Radio =

Coordinates: 51°8′30″N 0°54′49″E

AHBS Ashford Hospital Broadcasting Service
England
- Broadcast area: Ashford, Kent
- Frequency: 107.1 MHz

History
- First air date: 26 December 1971

Links
- Website: www.ahbs.org.uk

AHBS Hospital Radio is a hospital radio station serving the town of Ashford, Kent which launched on 26 December 1971.

The station broadcasts 24 hours a day around the wards of the William Harvey Hospital and on 107.1 FM Radio Ashford. The station is funded entirely by grants, donations and subscriptions.

== Broadcasting ==
The existing hospital station and studios are based at the William Harvey Hospital in Kennington.

The main output of AHBS is the Live Request Show daily with a regular line-up of presenters.

== History ==
AHBS (Ashford Hospital Broadcasting Service) has been broadcasting hospital radio to Ashford's hospitals since 1971. Radio Ashford Limited applied for a licence to operate a community station for Ashford, and were granted the new community station licence by OFCOM in May 2009 which includes some of the AHBS programmes.

The AHBS volunteers produced the Weekend Breakfast Show up until October 2017 when it was transferred to Radio Ashford to broadcast the show instead with the same frequency.
