= Iman FM =

Sheffield; England
- Frequency: 103.1 MHz
- RDS: IMAN_FM_

Programming
- Format: Religious

Ownership
- Owner: Iman Media UK Ltd

History
- First air date: September 2014
- Last air date: 4 July 2017

Technical information
- Transmitter coordinates: 53.4162°N 1.4282°W

Iman FM (103.1 MHz) was a British community radio station based in Sheffield, South Yorkshire. Broadcast from a transmitter site at Wincobank, to the east of the city of Sheffield, its programming was primarily religious in nature and focused on the Muslim community. It was the first community radio station in the United Kingdom to have its broadcasting licence revoked after broadcasting a number of lectures by radical cleric and al-Qaeda extremist Anwar al-Awlaki.

== History ==
Iman FM launched in September 2014, using the Sheffield-based FM frequency previously occupied by Burngreave Community Radio, a local station which broadcast between 2008 and 2011. It was operated by a religious group, Institute of Media, Arts and Naats.

=== Anwar al-Awlaki incident ===
The station came to the attention of media regulator Ofcom in July 2017 after a listener complained of hearing several hours of lectures by Anwar al-Awlaki during the month of Ramadan, leading Ofcom to take the unusual step of suspending the station's licence to broadcast for a period of three weeks from 4 July 2017, pending investigation.

Ofcom's subsequent investigation revealed that Iman FM had broadcast over 25 hours of material featuring al-Awlaki, in place of the station's usual morning programming during Ramadan. The regulator found that the broadcast content included "a direct call to action to members of the Muslim community to prepare for and carry out violent action against non-Muslim people" and "statements clearly condoning and encouraging acts of crime, terrorism or violent behaviour".

Responding to Ofcom, the operators of Iman FM said that they were unaware of the background of al-Awlaki, that they had obtained the "freely available" lectures from YouTube to replace scheduled morning programming, that they believed the content consisted of uncontroversial historical descriptions of the life of the Prophet Muhammad, and that monitoring of output had not been performed as management were "probably catching up on sleep" during early mornings in the month of Ramadan. After being made aware, Iman FM said that they had removed the lectures from broadcast immediately and transmitted an on-air apology.

As a result of the investigation, on 26 July 2017, the station's licence, which had not been reinstated following its temporary suspension, was permanently revoked, with Ofcom stating that Iman Media UK Ltd was "unfit to hold a licence". As of April 2023, the 103.1 MHz frequency in the Sheffield area remains unoccupied.
