= Hull's 107FM =

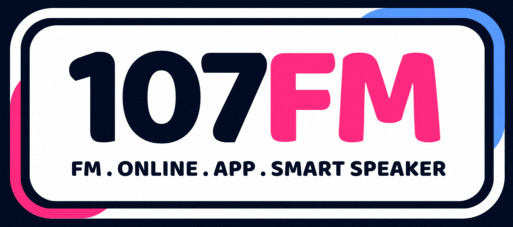
- Hull; England
- Frequency: 107.4 MHz
- RDS: -107FM-

Ownership
- Owner: HK Media & Training Ltd

History
- First air date: 6 February 2015
- Former names: Hull Kingston Radio (2015–2022)

Links
- Website: 107fm.co.uk

Hull's 107FM is a community radio station broadcasting to Kingston upon Hull, England.

== History ==
The station originally launched in 2015 as Hull Kingston Radio broadcasting from the West Stand of Craven Park rugby stadium. It was founded by Pete Mills who modelled the station after the former local station KCFM before its takeover by Lincs FM Group. It was not, however, connected to the Hull Kingston Rovers club.

In 2017, the station moved to a larger premises on Preston Road. It moved again in 2021 to new studios at One Business Village, Emily Street.

It relaunched as Hull's 107FM on 8 August 2022.

== Programming ==
David Burns hosts a show on the station, having joined in 2023 after his stint at BBC Radio Humberside. Andy Comfort, also formerly of BBC Radio Humberside, began his show in February 2025.
