= Diversity FM =

England
- Broadcast area: Lancaster
- Frequency: 103.5 MHz

Programming
- Format: Community

Ownership
- Owner: YMCA

History
- First air date: 9 October 2007
- Last air date: 27 April 2012

Links
- Website: No longer active

Diversity FM was a community radio station based in Lancaster, north Lancashire, which covered the Lancaster and Morecambe district. It broadcast a mixture of live and pre-recorded shows and music 24/7 on 103.5FM and via the Internet.

It launched at 11am on 9 October 2007 with the first song 'I'm on my Way' from the musical 'Paint Your Wagon'.

At the start of September 2011 Diversity FM launched a new website and started to play announcements on air that a change was happening on 3 October 2011 ahead of a brief re-brand and relaunch before its eventual closure.

In early March it was reported that Diversity FM was to close down at the end of the month due to problems with funding. At midnight on 31 March 2012, Diversity FM was to cease its live broadcasting. The presenters (a large group of the volunteers involved with the station at the time and some previous members) were unable to decide what to play as the last 'official' song and the broadcast was extended due to the presenters not wanting to end. Eventually, the last song was chosen and played at twenty nine minutes past midnight (00:29) on 1 April 2012, the song 'September' by Earth Wind and Fire marked the end of the station's live broadcasting and the station went into automation (or 'Non-Stop Diversity' as it was branded). On 27 April 2012 the transmitter was turned off. The last song (which just happened to be 'I Try' by Macy Gray) was followed by the last piece of audio heard on 103.5FM: a clip of Edmund Blackadder and Queen Elizabeth from the popular TV show 'Blackadder' reciting the end of a ransom note that read "hope you're not too miffed... byeeeeee". This was followed by the last post and a final jingle.
