= Community Radio Awards =

British awards

The Community Radio Awards are an accolade bestowed upon creatives in the community sector of broadcast radio in the United Kingdom. The awards showcase the work of community radio volunteers.

== History ==
The Community Radio Awards were founded in 2016 by Rebecca Steers.

The 2016 awards ceremony was held in Birmingham

The 2017 awards ceremony was held on 23 September in Bristol following a process involving over 350 entries in 16 categories from 70 community stations.

The 2018 ceremony was held on 15 September in Sheffield, with 360 entries considered from 77 stations in 18 categories.

The 2019 ceremony was held in Barry, Wales in October, receiving more than 425 entries.

Due to the COVID-19 pandemic, the 2020 ceremony was held online on December 7, receiving 460 entries for consideration from 90 stations.

The 2021 ceremony was held on 23 October in Coventry following the inaugural national Community Radio Conference by the UK Community Radio Network

== Nominations and winners ==
=== 2024 ===
Community Radio Award winners:

- Special Award: 2024 General Election Coverage
  - Gold: Wycombe Sound General Election Coverage 2024
  - Silver: Vote24 Radio Programme – NLive Radio
  - Bronze: General Election History for the Isle of Wight – Vectis Radio
- Newcomer of the Year - Sponsored by The Radio Hub
  - Gold: Paul "Babz" Plumb – Sheppey FM 92.2
  - Silver: Joshua Jones – Academy fm Thanet
  - Bronze: Olivia Giovanna Goodman – Radio Cardiff
- Sage Person of the Year
  - Gold: Tony Gillham – Black Cat Radio
  - Silver: Ronald Leleux – Vectis Radio
  - Bronze: Catriona Maclean – Radio Skye
- Young Person of the Year - Sponsored by The Radio Hub
  - Gold: Olly Hilton – BFBS Catterick
  - Silver: Theo Oakley – Radio Folkestone
  - Bronze: Luke McNamara – Radio Woking
- Volunteer of the Year - Sponsored by Wales Community Radio Network
  - Gold: Robin Zhang – Radio Cardiff
  - Silver: Josh Holmes-Bright – Caroline Coastal FM
  - Bronze: Dave Dallard – Erewash Sound
- Sports Show of the Year
  - Gold: Richard Wyeth – BFBS Aldershot
  - Silver: Live Local Sports Commentary – Mix 92.6
  - Bronze: The Rapha Report – Radio Skye
- Arts & Creative Radio of the Year - Sponsored by Devaweb
  - Gold: A Christmas Carol – Cambridge 105 Radio
  - Silver: Together – Warminster Community Radio
  - Bronze: Unplugged with Ashlee – Switch Radio
- News, Journalism & Factual Storytelling of the Year - Sponsored by RadioToday
  - Gold: The Agony and The Ecstacy – Saving Oldham Coliseum – Oldham Community Radio
  - Silver: Hayley Hammond – BFBS Brize Norton
  - Bronze: Natasha Reneaux – BFBS Aldershot
- Specialist Content Show of the Year - Sponsored by PRS for Music
  - Gold: Hooray 4 Musicals – A Christmas Carol – Maritime Radio
  - Silver: A 'Sky Tonight' Special Report – HCR104fm
  - Bronze: Martin Lunn – The Astronomy Show – Drystone Radio
- Specialist Music Show of the Year - Sponsored by PPL
  - Gold: Crossover Country – Radio Skye
  - Silver: The Indie Club – Spark
  - Bronze: Currently Country – K107FM
- Entertainment Show of the Year - Sponsored by CopMedia
  - Gold: Hayley Hammond – BFBS Brize Norton
  - Silver: Ryan Galpin – BFBS Salisbury Plain
  - Bronze: Lunchtime with Tristan B – BCfm
- Live Event or Outside Broadcast of the Year
  - Gold: St Neots Festival – Black Cat Radio
  - Silver: Bro Radio's Community Awards – Bro Radio
  - Bronze: Radio LaB at Radio 1's Big Weekend – Radio LaB 97.1FM
- Female Presenter of the Year
  - Gold: Steffi Callister – Cambridge 105 Radio
  - Silver: Suzy Lee – Radio Skye
  - Bronze: Amy Gray – Cambridge 105 Radio
- Male Presenter of the Year
  - Gold: Stephen Higgs – Switch Radio
  - Silver: Ryan Galpin – BFBS Salisbury Plain
  - Bronze: Luke Wallwork – Liverpool Community Radio
- Community Show of the Year
  - Gold: Rhondda Heritage Hour – Rhondda Radio
  - Silver: In Conversation with Indiraa – Nu Sound Radio 92FM
  - Bronze: Ampthill Past Memories – Radio LaB 97.1FM
- Community Impact Project of the Year
  - Gold: YouthSPACE – Radio Skye
  - Silver: The 4PS Radio Vectis Radio Training School is 10 years old – Vectis Radio
  - Bronze: River Radio Toy Appeal – River Radio
- Station of the Year
  - Gold: ALL FM
  - Silver: Academy fm Thanet
  - Bronze: Vectis Radio

=== 2023 ===
Community Radio Award winners:

- Special Category: HM Queen Elizabeth II – Her life, Her reign, and her passing
  - Gold: Northampton remembers and celebrates HM Queen Elizabeth II - NLive Radio
  - Silver: The Queen In Birmingham - Switch Radio
  - Bronze:Her Majesty Queen Elizabeth II Has Died - Cambridge 105 Radio
- Special Category: Coronation of King Charles III
  - Gold:Coronation of the King - BFBS Aldershot
  - Silver:The Coronation Ceilidh Special Broadcast - Radio Skye
  - Bronze:The Day the King Came - Bolton FM
- Newcomer of the Year
  - Gold:Ian Campfield - Gateway 97.8
  - Silver:Jenny Jefferies - Black Cat Radio
  - Bronze:Phil Norris - Vectis Radio
- Sage Person of the Year (Over 60)
  - Gold:Sam Hinks - Radio Skye
  - Silver:Paul James - Academy FM Thanet
  - Bronze:Norman Ross - Quality Radio
- Young Person of the Year (under 25)
  - Gold:Josh Holmes-Bright - Caroline Community Radio
  - Silver: Daisy Barker - Chelmsford Community Radio
  - Bronze:Dafydd Furnham - Bro Radio
- Volunteer of the Year
  - Gold:Maggie Currie - Vectis Radio
  - Silver:Steven Weighill - Sheppey FM 92.2
  - Bronze:Brian Dobson - Black Cat Radio
- Sports Show of the Year
  - Gold:Saturday Sports Show: Non-League Day Special - Black Country Radio
  - Silver:Varsity 2023: Bedfordshire vs Northampton - Radio LaB 97.1FM
  - Bronze:The Local Sports Mix - Mix 92.6
- Arts & Creative Radio of the Year
  - Gold:Frankenstein the Pantomime - Chelmsford Community Radio
  - Silver:The Art of Listening - Resonance FM
  - Bronze:The Space Folk Horror Lounge Mummer's Play - Frome FM
- News, Journalism & Factual Storytelling of the Year
  - Gold:The Host - Ukraine 1 Year On - Hope FM
  - Silver:Trinity Theatre Seniors - West Kent Radio
  - Bronze:Forced Out - BFBS Aldershot
- Specialist Content Show of the Year
  - Gold:A Space to Speak Your Mind – SourceFM
  - Silver:Your Voice - Black Cat Radio
  - Bronze:The Parents' Show - Mix 92.6
- Specialist Music Show of the Year
  - Gold:Baker's Dozen Radio Show - Ipswich Community Radio
  - Silver:Friday Night Trad - Radio Skye
  - Bronze:Currently Country - K107fm
- Entertainment Show of the Year
  - Gold:Gemma-Leigh James - BFBS Brize Norton
  - Silver:Glenn Jones - Cambridge 105 Radio
  - Bronze:Tom & Matty's Monthly Montage - Maritime Radio
- Live Event or Outside Broadcast of the Year
  - Gold:Carols for Christmas – SourceFM
  - Silver:Varsity 2023: Bedfordshire vs Northampton - Radio LaB 97.1FM
  - Bronze:Mix 92.6 at The National League Play Off Final - Mix 92.6
- Female Presenter of the Year
  - Gold:Priya Matharu - Switch Radio
  - Silver:Dr Audrey Tang - NLive Radio
  - Bronze:Gemma-Leigh James - BFBS Brize Norton
- Male Presenter of the Year
  - Gold:Ste Greenall - Black Cat Radio
  - Silver:Patrick Foster - Academy FM Thanet
  - Bronze:Neil Kefford - Academy FM Thanet
- Community Show of the Year
  - Gold:Sophie Preece - Switch Radio
  - Silver:The Erskine Veterans Radio Show - Quality Radio
  - Bronze:A Space to Speak Your Mind - SourceFM
- Community Impact Project of the Year
  - Gold:Rehabilitation into Education - Sheppey FM 92.2
  - Silver:The 4Ps Radio Training School for Young People - Vectis Radio
  - Bronze:Food For Thought - The Voice FM
- Station of the Year
  - Gold:Sheppey FM 92.2
  - Silver:Vectis Radio
  - Bronze:Ujima Radio

=== 2021 ===
Community Radio Awards 2021:

- Community Development Project of the Year
  - Bronze Business Watch – Academy FM Thanet
  - Silver A Space to Speak your Mind – SourceFM
  - Gold The 4PS Radio Training School – Vectis Radio
- Station of the Year
  - Bronze Sheppey FM
  - Silver Heartland FM
  - Gold Pride Radio
- Female Presenter of the Year
  - Bronze Amelia Slaughter – Marlow FM
  - Silver Katherine Liley – Heartland FM
  - Gold Suzie "Sparkles" Stevens – LCR FM
- Male Presenter of the Year
  - Bronze Ste Greenall – Black Cat Radio
  - Silver Kev Lawrence – PCR103.2FM
  - Gold Lewis Bowden – BFBS Catterick
- Community Show of the Year
  - Bronze A Space to Speak your Mind – SourceFM
  - Silver The Kev Lawrence Breakfast Show – PCR103.2FM
  - Gold Christmas Day Radio Festival of Carols and Readings – Black Country Radio
- Live Event or Outside Broadcast of the Year
  - Bronze Scottish Parliamentary Elections 2021 – Heartland FM
  - Silver The Marlow Christmas Drive-In – Marlow FM
  - Gold The Falmouth Remembrance Service – SourceFM
- Entertainment Show of the Year
  - Bronze Lewis Bowden's Afternoon Show – BFBS Catterick
  - Silver Natasha Reneaux Entertainment Show – BFBS Aldershot
  - Gold Switch Radio's Christmas Crackers – Switch Radio
- Speech & Journalism of the Year
  - Bronze One Voice Radio Series: Chinese life in Britain – allfm
  - Silver Dad raises funds for MIND, in memory of his son – Black Cat Radio
  - Gold Down on the Farm – Spark Sunderland
- Arts & Creative Radio of the Year
  - Bronze Camelot – Chelmsford Community Radio
  - Silver The Spooky Hour, by The Saturday Writers and Jonathan Pagden – Wycombe Sound
  - Gold Beginning Of The End – Radio LaB 97.1FM
- Specialist Music Show of the Year
  - Bronze Around the World – Lisburn's 98FM
  - Silver The Rock Shop with Michelle Livings – Marlow FM
  - Gold Dance Revolution Chart of the Year 2020 – Spark Sunderland
- Sports Show of the Year
  - Bronze K107 Saturday Sports Show – K107FM
  - Silver Sports+ – Purbeck Coast FM
  - Gold Daily Life with Rajani – Awaz FM
- Volunteer of the Year
  - Bronze Kevin Ridgeon – Andover Radio
  - Silver Andy Rankine – Drystone Radio
  - Gold Nigel Dallard – Winchester Radio
- Young Person of the Year (under 25)
  - Bronze Aimee Cordwell – Sheppey FM
  - Silver Yanis Kerampran – Ipswich Community Radio
  - Gold Lewis Allsopp – Erewash Sound
- Sage Person of the Year (over 60)
  - Bronze Susie Mathis – Wythenshawe FM
  - Silver Moz Walsh – allfm
  - Gold Kelvin Currie – Vectis Radio
- Newcomer (new to radio in last 12 months)
  - Bronze Flight Sergeant James Bruce – BFBS Brize Norton
  - Silver Amelia Salmons – Erewash Sound
  - Gold Ashleigh Kennan-Bryce – Heartland FM
- Innovation of the Year
  - Bronze A Space to Speak your Mind – SourceFM
  - Silver Short Breaks in Lockdown – The 4Ps Radio Training School – Vectis Radio
  - Gold 12 Communities One Bristol – BCfm Radio – Bristol Community FM
- Podcast of the Year
  - Bronze 12 Communities One Bristol – BCfm Radio – Bristol Community FM
  - Silver Rough Diamonds: True Colours – DWS AUDIO
  - Gold The Alfred Daily Podcast – This is Alfred
- Digital or RSL Station of The Year
  - Bronze Ocean Youth Radio
  - Silver Petersfield's Shine Radio – Petersfield's Shine Radio
  - Gold Radio Wanno – HMP Wandsworth – Radio Wanno – HMP Wandsworth
- Covid and Community Response
  - Bronze Coronavirus Update – Gateway 97.8
  - Silver Covid Response – BFBS Aldershot
  - Gold Hidden Heroes, Marlow's Quiet Night In, and more – Marlow FM

=== 2020 ===
Community Radio Awards 2020:

- Community Development Project of the Year
  - The #Lovebus – Andover Radio
  - Occupy The Airwaves: 2020 – Phonic FM
  - The Radio Plus Community Advent Calendar 2019 – Radio Plus
  - A Space to Speak Your Mind – Source FM
  - The Vectis Radio 4Ps Radio Training School – Vectis Radio
- Station of the Year
  - Bro Radio
  - Express FM
  - Môn FM
  - Pride Radio
  - Raidió Fáilte
- Female Presenter of the Year
  - Fiona McNeill – Dunoon Community Radio
  - Gemma-Leigh James (Gemza) – Marlow FM
  - Priya Matharu – Switch Radio
  - Pippa Sawyer – Wycombe Sound
  - Julie Donaldson – Zetland FM
- Male Presenter of the Year
  - Luis Wyatt – Andover Radio
  - Chris Kaye – BFBS Catterick
  - Tom Lamb – Erewash Sound
  - Lee Roe – Ribble FM
  - Rob L'Esperance – Wycombe Sound
- Community Show of the Year
  - Radio: Impact! – Cambridge 105 Radio
  - VE Day Party – Gateway 97.8
  - Trevor Blackman Now – Maritime Radio
  - The For Women By Women Show – Vectis Radio
  - The Vectis Radio 4Ps Training School Documentary – Vectis Radio
- Live Event or Outside Broadcast of the Year
  - Virtual Strawberry Fair – Cambridge 105 Radio
  - Memories Bus – Gateway 97.8
  - Northern Pride Festival 2019 – Pride Radio
  - Day trip for elderly people – Radio Verulam
  - Surrey Fire And Rescue Service Open Day – Susy Radio
- Entertainment Show of the Year
  - Coffee and Tea – Gateway 97.8
  - Drive with Emma Millen – Spark
  - Vibe Breakfast – Vibe 107.6 FM
  - Morning Plus with Ollie Darvill – Erewash Sound
  - Amelia Slaughter – Marlow FM
- Speech & Journalism of the Year
  - When a community rallies round – after the radio station broke the story – Black Cat Radio
  - Community rallies round as cemetery memorial is vandalised – Black Cat Radio
  - Basildon Question Time – Gateway 97.8
  - Meet The Smugglers – Radio LaB 97.1FM
  - He's Just A Cleaner – Spark
- Arts & Creative Radio of the Year
  - Virtual Strawberry Fair – Cambridge 105 Radio
  - The Luncarty Lockdown – Heartland FM
  - A Fete Worse Than Death – Somer Valley FM
  - David Jay's Remembrance Sunday programme – Susy Radio
  - Mulch – A Tale of Allotment Folk (Soap Opera) – Warminster Community Radio
- Specialist Music Show of the Year
  - Country In My Veins – Ali Donowho – Alive Radio
  - It's Showtime with Ryan & Jodana – Bro Radio
  - Community Keyboards with Ian Wolstenholme – Oldham Community Radio
  - The Vintage Show with Liz Catlow – Ribble FM
  - Priya Matharu – Switch Radio
- Sports Show of the Year
  - Richard Wyeth – Sports Show – BFBS Aldershot
  - Bro Radio's Saturday Sport – Bro Radio
  - NLive Sports Show – NLive Radio
  - Verulam Sport – Radio Verulam
  - Switch Radio Sport – Switch Radio
- Volunteer of the Year
  - Kevin Rennie – Alive Radio
  - Stephen Spencer – Ipswich Community Radio
  - Alex Airnes – K107fm
  - Steve Fox – Red Kite Radio
  - Kelvin Currie – Vectis Radio
- Young Person of the Year (under 25)
  - Luis Wyatt – Andover Radio
  - Johnny Jenkins – Gateway 97.8
  - Yanis Kerampran – Ipswich Community Radio
  - Lucy Ashburner – Marlow FM
  - Jake Hunter – Radio Ninesprings
- Sage Person (Over 60)
  - Moz Walsh – ALLFM
  - Liz Mullen – BFBS Colchester
  - Tony Barnfield – Cambridge 105 Radio
  - Rob Bayly – Somer Valley FM
  - Paul Blitz – Winchester Radio
- Newcomer (new to radio in last 12 months)
  - Claire Hamilton – Drystone Radio
  - Angie B – Marlow FM
  - Kate Walker – Red Kite Radio
  - Isabel Ellis – Ribble FM
  - Benjy Potter – Vibe 107.6 FM
- Innovation Award
  - Live under lockdown! – Cambridge 105 Radio
  - We created the board game, called 'Our Time and Place...Halifax' – Phoenix Fm
  - COBS – A Complete Outside Broadcast System – Radio Verulam
  - Switch Radio's News Hub – Switch Radio
  - The Vectis Radio 4ps Vectis Radio Training School – Vectis Radio
- Podcast
  - RAINBOW DADS – Stories of Gay and Bi Dads – Chelmsford Community Radio
  - Primrose and Terry: in the shed – Radio LaB 97.1FM
  - FEM2020 – Spark
  - LockDown Reflections – Ujima Radio
  - Kids in Quarantine Podcast – Chelmsford Community Radio
- Digital or RSL Station Of The Year
  - Maidstone Radio
  - Ocean Youth
  - Radio Ysbyty Gwynedd
  - Riverside Radio
  - Swansbrook Radio
- Special Coverage: 2019 General Elections Coverage
  - Election Coverage 2019 #BrumVotes – Switch Radio
  - All Out Election – Gateway 97.8
  - The South West Wiltshire Interviews – Warminster Community Radio
  - General Election Coverage – Wycombe Sound
  - General Election Hustings – Bro Radio

=== 2019 ===
- Podcast of the Year
  - Gold: Rich Seams – New Writing North
  - Silver: ArtsWatch – Riverside Radio
  - Bronze: Speak Up Sunderland – Solo Arts CIC
- Innovation of the Year
  - Gold: Pride Community Network – Pride Radio
  - Silver: Not so much a website, more a community hub – Radio Verulam
  - Bronze The Local Radio Marketing Group – Wycombe Sound
- Newcomer of the Year (new to radio in last 12 months)
  - Gold: Jenna Myles – FromeFM
  - Silver: Sam Sethi – Marlow FM
  - Bronze Lewis Allsopp – Erewash Sound
- Sage Person (Over 60)
  - Gold: Geoff Selby – Bro Radio
  - Silver: Kelvin Currie – Vectis Radio
  - Bronze Sue Rodwell Smith – HCR FM
- Young Person of the Year (under 25)
  - Gold: Emma Snow – Erewash Sound
  - Silver: Kane McMahon – Bro Radio
  - Bronze Haashim Siddique – Asian Star Radio, Slough
- Volunteer of the Year
  - Gold: Kate Gregory – Speysound Radio
  - Silver: Chas Large – Red Kite Radio
  - Bronze Luke Davis – Wycombe Sound 106.6fm
- Sports Show of the Year
  - Gold: MônFM Sport – MônFM
  - Silver: Verulam Sports – Radio Verulam
  - Bronze The Terrace Radio Show – Radio Cardiff
- Specialist Music Show of the Year
  - Gold: The Roots Collective – Wycombe Sound
  - Silver: It's Showtime with Ryan & Jodana – Bro Radio
  - Bronze Alex Krupa's Country Show – Andover Radio
- Arts & Creative Radio of the Year
  - Gold: Maritime Radio Launch: A Love Song to Greenwich & Woolwich – Maritime Radio
  - Silver: Where I Was Born, Where I Was Raised – Spark Sunderland
  - Bronze "The UK's most creative independent radio station" – Resonance FM
- Speech & Journalism of the Year
  - Gold: Autism & It's Possibilities – Radio LaB 97.1FM
  - Silver: Talking Men – The Alex Skeel Interview – Cambridge 105 Radio
  - Bronze Second Chance: Disclosing Your Past – Swindon 105.5
- Entertainment Show of the Year
  - Gold: Desi Beats Show with Desi Diva Deepa – Asian Star Radio
  - Silver: Robbie James – Express FM
  - Bronze The Dylan Taylor Breakfast Show – 107 Endeavour FM
- Live Event or Outside Broadcast of the Year
  - Gold: Source FM Christmas Party 2018 – Source FM
  - Silver: Source FM's Parklive – Source FM
  - Bronze Start of the Great North Run 2018 – Radio Tyneside
- Female Presenter of the Year
  - Gold: Jo Thoenes – BFBS Brize Norton
  - Silver: Gemma-Leigh James – Marlow FM
  - Bronze Fiona McNeill – Dunoon Community Radio
- Male Presenter of the Year
  - Gold: Sam Day – Future Radio
  - Silver: Rob L'Esperance – Wycombe Sound 106.6fm
  - Bronze Chris Kaye – BFBS Catterick
- Community Show of the Year
  - Gold: Julie Donaldson's Morning Mix – Zetland FM
  - Silver: The Health and Wellbeing Hour – Heartland FM
  - Bronze The Vale This Week – Bro Radio
- Community Development Project of the Year
  - Gold: Chapel St Primary School takes over – ALL FM
  - Silver: Cash 4 Calendars Campaign – Spark Sunderland
  - Bronze The 4Ps Project – Vectis Radio
- Digital or RSL Station Of The Year
  - Gold: Radio Wanno
  - Silver: Ocean Youth Radio
  - Bronze Thre3-6ix Radio & Scout Radio
- Station of the Year
  - Gold: ALL FM
  - Silver: Wycombe Sound
  - Bronze Spark Sunderland

=== 2018 ===
- Station of the Year
  - Gold: Raidió Fáilte
  - Silver: Spark Sunderland
  - Bronze: ALL FM
- Community Development Project of the Year
  - Gold: The METS Training programme - Somer Valley FM
  - Silver: Mental Health Community Project - Sheppey FM
  - Bronze: The 4Ps Project - Vectis Radio
- Female Presenter of the Year
  - Gold: Julie Donaldson - Zetland FM
  - Silver: Philippa Sawyer - Wycombe Sound
  - Bronze: Emma Snow - Erewash Sound
- Male Presenter of the Year
  - Gold: Mark Jarvis - Erewash Sound
  - Silver: Rob L'Esperance - Wycombe Sound
  - Bronze: Simon Wilson - Voice FM
- Community Show of the Year
  - Gold: Pol.ON – The Polish Show - East Coast FM
  - Silver: Tameside Today - Tameside Radio
  - Bronze: The One Love Breakfast Show - BCfm
- Live Event or Outside Broadcast of the Year
  - Gold: Local Radio Day 2018 - Wycombe Sound
  - Silver: General Election 2017 - Chelmsford Community Radio
  - Bronze: 'Spirit of Wildfire' – A Festival for Radio - 107 Meridian FM
- Entertainment Show of the Year
  - Gold: The Rob L'Esperance Jukebox - Wycombe Sound
  - Silver: Emma Snow - Erewash Sound
  - Gold: Drivetime with Ryan and Beth - Spark Sunderland
- Speech and Journalism of the Year
  - Gold: The Parents' Show - Radio Verulam
  - Silver: Opening of the Herne Centre - Radio Cabin
  - Bronze: Dear Reader with Jessica Stone - CSR
- Sports Show of the Year
  - Gold: Tuesday Night Sport - Wycombe Sound
  - Silver: OB's Saturday Sport Show - Radio Cardiff
  - Bronze: Live Commentary – FA Cup – Birmingham Senior Cup - Black Country Radio
- Volunteer of the Year
  - Gold: Oliver Downing - KCC Live
  - Silver: Oliver Wilkinson - Drystone Radio
  - Bronze: Alex Farrell - Radio Tamworth
- Young Person of the Year
  - Gold: Jeannie Nicolas - Erewash Sound
  - Silver: Liam Gates - Wycombe Sound
  - Bronze: James O'Malley - Tameside Radio
- Sage Person of the Year
  - Gold: Chris Moore - Endeavour FM
  - Silver: Roz Johnson - Wythenshawe Community Radio
  - Bronze: Bill Prentice - Black Diamond FM
- Newcomer of the Year
  - Gold: Jane Steele - Drystone Radio
  - Silver: Abbie Clive - Sheppey FM
  - Bronze: Mimi Harker OBE - Wycombe Sound
- Innovation of the Year
  - Gold: 'Get On' - Science Education & Community Radio - Academy FM Folkestone
  - Silver: Halifax The Halifax Jigsaw Project - Phoenix FM
  - Bronze: The Chorley FM '100 Club' - Chorley FM
- Podcast of the Year
  - Gold: National Prison Radio Double Bubble
- Digital/RSL Station of the Year
  - Gold: Wandsworth Radio

=== 2017 ===
- Station of the Year
  - ALL FM
  - Raidió Fáilte
  - Ribble FM
  - Somer Valley FM
  - Wycombe Sound 106.6FM
- Community Development Project of the Year
  - Radio Sheung Lok – ALL FM
  - Mackem Craic – Spark FM
  - A Present from the Past – Phoenix FM Halifax
  - Alright Mate I'm Listening (Male Mental Health Project) – Ribble FM
  - Global Sunderland – Spark FM
- Female Presenter of the Year
  - Laura Perry – CSRfm
  - Fiona Jessica Wilson (aka FJ) – Ipswich Community Radio
  - Louise Croombs – Tameside Radio
  - Philippa Sawyer – Wycombe Sound 106.6FM
  - Julie Donaldson – Zetland FM
- Male Presenter of the Year
  - Mark Jarvis – Erewash Sound
  - Rory Auskerry – Pure 107.8FM
  - Lee Roe – Ribble FM
  - Mark Blackman – Wirral Radio
  - Rob L'Esperance – Wycombe Sound 106.6FM
- Community Show of the Year
  - The Midweek Sportsbar – BCFM Radio
  - Summer Saturday – Cambridge 105
  - Kinlochlovin Drivetime – Nevis Radio
  - Farming Friday – Ribble FM
  - Mid-Morning – Wycombe Sound 106.6FM
- Live Event or Outside Broadcast of the Year
  - Les James Challenge Cup Final 2017 – 107.5 Switch Radio
  - BCfm Election night 2017 – 1BCfm Radio
  - Tour de Yorkshire – Drystone Radio
  - Failsworth Carnival – Oldham Community Radio 99.7fm
  - Radio Verulam brings LIVE FA Cup coverage to St Albans – Radio Verulam
- Entertainment Show of the Year
  - Old Gits and Hits – BCFM Bristol
  - The Kieran Poole Sessions – Miskin Radio
  - The Week in Geek – The biggest Geek radio show in the UK – Spark FM
  - Drivetime with Ryan and Beth – Spark FM
  - Breakfast with Louise – Tameside Radio
- Speech and Journalism Radio of the Year
  - Sapana Budha 'Nepal: after the Earthquake' – Radio LaB 97.1FM
  - Newsburst – Sheppey FM 92.2
  - Spark Reports – Spark FM
  - Rough Sleep – Tameside Radio
  - The Late Show with Joe Shennan – Wycombe Sound 106.6FM
- Arts and Creative Radio of the Year
  - Folkestone Life, A Sound Art Project – Academy FM (Folkestone)
  - Dear Reader – CSRfm
  - Huntsford – Huntingdon Community Radio (HCR104fm)
  - Lincoln Voices – Lincoln City Radio
  - The Second Coming – Warminster Community Radio
- Specialist Music Show of the Year
  - The Urban LP – CSRfm
  - The Vintage Show – Ribble FM
  - The Richard Harris Folk and Blues Show – Somer Valley FM
  - Dance Revolution – Spark FM
  - Showstoppers – Zetland FM
- Sports Show of the Year
  - The Wycombe Sound Saturday Sports Show – Wycombe Sound 106.6FM
  - The Saturday Scoreboard – Switch Radio
  - Sportsbyte – Spark FM
  - Radio Verulam FA Cup coverage St Albans v Carlisle United – Radio Verulam
  - OB's Saturday Sport Show – Radio Cardiff
- Volunteer of the Year
  - Ian Robertson – East Coast fm
  - John Weller – Nevis Radio
  - Arthur Chorley – Oldham Community Radio 99.7fm
  - Gary Tottingham – Radio LaB
  - Jack Bee – Sheppey 92.2 FM
- Young Person of the Year
  - Lila Bellamy – 107 Meridian FM
  - Jake Peach – CSRfm
  - Mark Jarvis – Erewash Sound
  - Rachel Price – Forces Radio BFBS Northern Ireland
  - Lewis Baxter – Ribble FM
- Sage Person of the Year
  - Hugh Taylor – Alive Radio
  - Manjulika Singh – Awaz FM
  - Trish Napier – Canalside Radio
  - Harry Haward – Resonance FM
  - Keith Green – Warminster Community Radio
- Newcomer of the Year
  - Katy Ashman – Abbey 104
  - Samantha Howard – Academy FM Folkestone
  - Mark Jarvis – Erewash Sound
  - Emma Snow – Erewash Sound
  - Lee Roe – Ribble FM
- Innovation Award
  - The One Pound SoundHound Round – East Coast 107.6FM
  - 300 Club Lottery – Oldham Community Radio 99.7fm
  - Building an Audience using Facebook Live – Spark FM
  - Mackem Craic – Spark FM
  - Raspberry Pi Uplink Solution – Wycombe Sound 106.6FM
- Podcast
  - Apex – Cam FM
  - Talking Men – Cambridge 105
  - Fair Frome Food Bank training podcast – Frome FM
  - Shadow – Insanity Radio
  - Radio Wanno – Radio Wanno (HMP Wandsworth)

=== 2016 ===
- Station of the Year: Ujima Radio
- Female Presenter of the Year: Primrose Granville - Ujima Radio
- Male Presenter of the Year: Ben Ellis - Switch Radio

== Honours ==
In 2021 the awards launched an Honours programme to honour those who have provided outstanding or exceptional service to Community Radio.

Those who have received honours are:

Audrey Hall for her decades of presenting and producing radio, and for community activity in support of and to increase representation of the black community in Greater Manchester, with most recently being part of the team at AllFM.

Danny Lawrence for his 20 plus years’ service to community radio, at various stations across the country, including the last 15 years at Gateway 97.8, for his services representing and supporting the sector with roles at the CMA, for founding the Radio Hub, and also in the last year supporting stations to give out thousands of free radios to those experiencing loneliness and isolation.

Graham Laycock for over 50 years of commitment to Community radio and his outstanding dedication to Brooklands Radio and the volunteers within it.

Nathan Spackman for his significant impact in the development of Bro Radio in Wales, especially illustrated by the station winning station of the year at last year’s awards, but also his continued work at developing and representing the sector, locally in Wales as the founding co chair of the Welsh community radio network and co-founder of the UK Community Radio Network

Soo Williams for her work at Ofcom being instrumental in facilitating the creation of community radio in its current form, and for overseeing its implementation until her retirement last year.

Tony Smith for his dedication over the last 20 plus years launching and running Angel Radio, who support an older audience.
