= Wycombe Sound =

Local radio station in High Wycombe, England

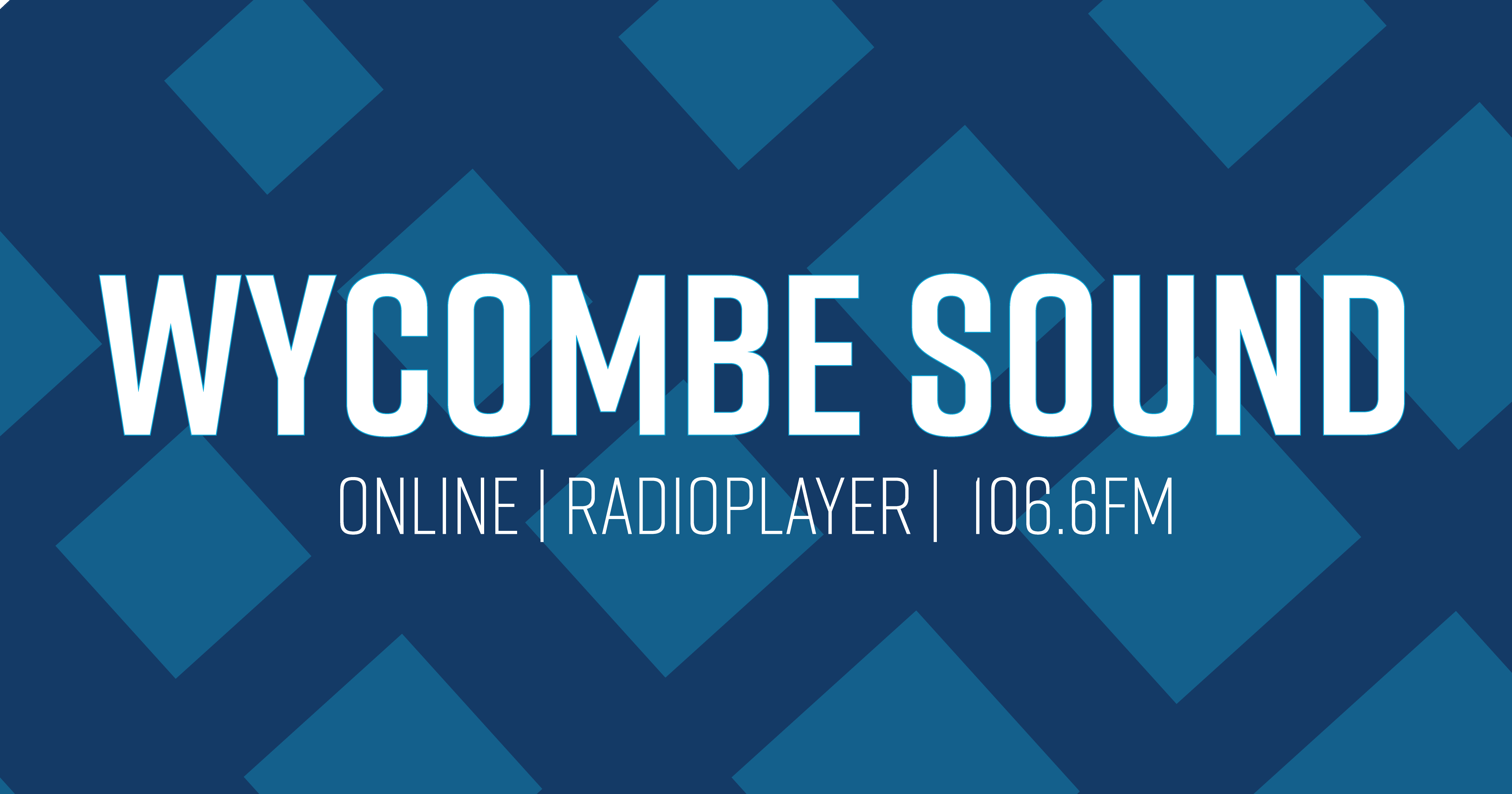

England
- Broadcast area: High Wycombe
- Frequency: 106.6 FM

Ownership
- Owner: Wycombe Community Radio Community Interest Company

History
- First air date: RSL 1: 9 December 2013 - 5 January 2014; RSL 2: 27 November 2014 - 24 December 2014; RSL 3: 19 November 2015 - 16 December 2015; Community Radio licence live from 31 October 2016.

Links
- Website: Official Wycombe Sound Site

Wycombe Sound is a local FM radio station that broadcasts to areas around High Wycombe in the United Kingdom. Areas of reception include High Wycombe, West Wycombe, Hazlemere and Downley. The station is run by Wycombe Community Radio which is a Community Interest Company and the day-to-day presenters and supporting staff are all volunteers.

In August 2017, Wycombe Sound 106.6fm was shortlisted in 7 categories of the Community Radio Awards: Station of the Year, Community Programme, Sports Programme, Speech & Journalism, Best Male Presenter, Best Female Presenter and Innovation. It won the Station Of The Year Award.

In January 2020, Wycombe Sound was nominated in the 2020 Audio and Radio Industry Awards in the John Myers Award for Best Local Radio Station

== RSL 1 ==
After receiving confirmation of their Restricted Service Licence on 6 November 2013, Wycombe Sound began their first 4-week RSL broadcast from the Octagon shopping area of Eden, High Wycombe on 9 December 2013 with The Mayor of High Wycombe opening the station live on the breakfast show. Over the four weeks a whole range of shows were broadcast including multiple local debate shows, local sport shows, breakfast and drivetime shows. Highlights of these and other shows can be heard on the Wycombe Sound Mixcloud page.

== RSL 2 ==
Wycombe Sound revealed on their Twitter that they would be returning for another 4 week RSL (Restricted Service Licence) starting on 27 November till 24 December. Wycombe Sound revealed on 10 October that they have been given 87.9 FM for their second pilot, a frequency previously used for another local radio station during RSLs, Blink FM. Wycombe Sound will be located in BidCo's new Enterprise HQ located in the center of High Wycombe. Once again a whole range of shows were broadcast with The Mayor of High Wycombe, Eric Knowles, Colin Baker and many of the local businesses and personalities joining in over the 4 week period. Dj Sparky B also known as Seb took part in Challenge Seb which can be viewed on Wycombe Sounds YouTube page.

== RSL 3 ==
Wycombe Sound return for another 4 week RSL in 2015 it was announced on Wycombe Sounds Twitter account on 2 July. Once again broadcasting on 87.9 FM and on their website but new for the third RSL it was announced that they would also be on their own mobile app for iOS and Android devices. Also, it was revealed that they would be broadcasting from their own permanent studios in the center of High Wycombe with a large space for bands and artists to perform in called The Blue Room also the team were developing a radio kitchen for food programs in the future. Many of the shows from the previous RSLs returned or had been updated with new presenters, program name or new features. The Mayor of High Wycombe once again opened the station on the first day. A brand new radio drama set in High Wycombe was launched called Made In Wycombe which was written especially for Wycombe Sound, it has a cast of 12 and a production crew trained by BBC and ITV. After finishing on 19 December the online and app stream was left on to broadcast music and best bits from over the last 3 RSLs and the occasional special live show.

== Full Community Licence ==
Wycombe Sound was granted a full 5 year Community Licence in April 2016 and launched on 106.6 FM at 7:00am on Monday 31 October 2016.

== Awards ==
| Year | Nominee / work | Award | Result |
|---|---|---|---|
| 2017 | The Saturday Sport Show | Community Radio Awards: Sports Show of the Year | Bronze |
| 2017 | Mid Mornings | Community Radio Awards: Community Show of the Year | Bronze |
| 2017 | Raspberry Pi Uplink Solution | Community Radio Awards: Innovation Award | Silver |
| 2017 | The Late Show with Joe Shennan | Community Radio Awards: Speech and Journalism of the Year | Silver |
| 2017 | Philippa Sawyer | Community Radio Awards: Female Presenter of the Year | Silver |
| 2017 | Rob L'Esperance | Community Radio Awards: Male Presenter of the Year | Silver |
| 2017 | Wycombe Sound | Community Radio Awards: Station of the Year | Gold |
| 2018 | Mimi Harker | Community Radio Awards: Newcomer of the Year | Bronze |
| 2018 | Liam Gates | Community Radio Awards: Young Person of the Year | Silver |
| 2018 | Philippa Sawyer | Community Radio Awards: Female Presenter of the Year | Silver |
| 2018 | Rob L'Esperance | Community Radio Awards: Male Presenter of the Year | Silver |
| 2018 | Tuesday Night Sport Show | Community Radio Awards: Sports Show of the Year | Gold |
| 2018 | The Rob L'Esperance Jukebox | Community Radio Awards: Entertainment Show of the Year | Gold |
| 2018 | Local Radio Day 2018 Coverage | Community Radio Awards: Live Event or Outside Broadcast | Gold |
| 2019 | Local Radio Marketing Group | Community Radio Awards: Innovation Award | Bronze |
| 2019 | Rob L’Esperance | Community Radio Awards: Male Presenter of the Year | Silver |
| 2019 | Luke Davis | Community Radio Awards: Volunteer of the Year | Silver |
| 2019 | Wycombe Sound | Community Radio Awards: Station of the Year | Silver |
| 2019 | The Roots Collective | Community Radio Awards: Volunteer of the Year | Gold |
| 2020 | Wycombe Sound | ARIAS: John Myers Award for Best Local Radio Station | Nominated |
| 2023 | Wycombe Sound | ARIAS: Community Station of the Year | Nominated |
