= 107.0 FM =

FM radio frequency

The following radio stations broadcast on FM frequency 107.0 MHz:

== Belgium ==
- Radio Contact in Eupen

== China ==
- CNR The Voice of China in Kunming and Zhoushan

== Indonesia ==
- Be 107 FM in Batam and Singapore

== Malaysia ==
- Suria in Seremban, Negeri Sembilan

== United Kingdom ==
- 107 Meridian FM in East Grinstead
- Capital Manchester and Lancashire in Blackburn
- Fosse 107 in Loughborough
- Greatest Hits Radio Berkshire & North Hampshire in Reading
- Heart West in West Cornwall
- Isle of Wight Radio
- Q Radio in County Antrim
- Spark in Sunderland
- Sunshine Radio in Monmouth

== Uganda ==
- Salt FM 107.0 in Kampala
