= 96.8 FM =

FM radio frequency

The following radio stations broadcast on FM frequency 96.8 MHz:

== Africa ==
GABz Fm In Botswana

== Cyprus ==
- Radio Sfera at Nicosia

== China ==
- GRT Music Radio in Meizhou

== Greece ==
- Rythmos FM at Drama, Macedonia
- Minore Kallonis 96.8 at Kalloni, Lesvos Prefecture
- Velvet 96.8 at Thessaloniki
- ERA 3 in Pilio; Volos

== Latvia ==
- EHR SuperHits in Riga

== Nepal ==
- Radio Lumbini at Lumbini

== Netherlands ==
- NPO 3FM at IJsselstein

== New Zealand ==
- George FM at Queenstown

== North Macedonia ==
- Radio Fortuna at Skopje

== Singapore ==
- Oli 96.8FM

== Russia ==
- Vesti FM (VGTRK) rebroadcasting in Novorossiysk

== Spain ==
- Radio Brian - Gran Canaria

== United Kingdom ==
- BBC Radio Cymru at Cardiff
- Erewash Sound at Erewash
- Greatest Hits Radio Scottish Borders & North Northumberland at Selkirk
- Mon FM at Anglesey & Gwynedd
- Radio Wester Ross

== Zanzibar ==
- Zenji FM
