= CUR =

A cur is a type of dog.

CUR may refer to:

- The IAAF code for Curaçao
- The IATA code for Hato International Airport, Curaçao
- Cambridge University Radio
- CUR, file format for cursor images from Microsoft, practically identical to ICO (icon image file format)
- The Greater scaup was historically known in southern England as the Cur
- The French gastronomic critic Curnonsky
- IOC sport code for curling at the Winter Olympics
