= Blink FM =

Former radio station in Wycombe, England

High Wycombe; England
- Broadcast area: Buckinghamshire
- Frequency: FM: 87.9 MHz

Programming
- Language: English
- Format: Online Contemporary hit radio and Talk

Ownership
- Owner: Wycombe Youth Action (WYA)

History
- First air date: FM RSL Broadcasts - August 2002; Online Broadcasting - August 2010
- Last air date: FM RSL Broadcasts - August 2010; Online Broadcasting - June 2016

Technical information
- Transmitter coordinates: 51.6284°N 0.7517°W

Links
- Website: Official Blink FM Website (Archived Copy)

Blink FM (Blink for short) was a local FM and Online radio station run by Wycombe Youth Action which used to broadcast to areas of South Buckinghamshire in the United Kingdom and online through their website - areas of FM broadcast reception included High Wycombe, Hazlemere, Downley, Beaconsfield, Penn and the northern area of Marlow.

== History ==
=== FM RSL broadcasts ===
From 2002 to 2010 (inclusive) the station used to broadcast under a Restricted Service Licence (RSL) on 87.9 FM every August 1–28. Since the last RSL in August 2010, the frequency has also been used by local radio station Wycombe Sound for a few of their RSLs, where older members from the Blink team often went to continue their radio career.

=== Online broadcasting ===
When the station stopped FM broadcasting, it moved to online broadcasting through their website. This broadcast was intermittently available from August 2010 when the last RSL broadcast ended until 2012. In late August 2012, volunteers at the station made the online broadcast available 24/7 through the Blink FM website. However, since Wycombe Youth Action moved building in early 2016, the station no longer broadcasts online and now appears to have become an abandoned project.

=== Live events ===
In 2015, the volunteer team also held two separate and popular music events live, coined Blink Live and Blink Live 2, to raise money to buy new equipment for the station. The money raised was given to Wycombe Youth Action who managed the radio station, its equipment and volunteers.

== Broadcast information ==
Blink FM's studio was based in High Wycombe, last based at the Apollo Center, also the home of Wycombe Youth Action.

The team used high quality mixing desks and microphones to present the show live, aided by Myriad studio playlist software to cue the music. When a volunteer presenter (often part of Wycombe Youth Action) wasn't live, studio software broadcast an automatically generated playlist 24/7.

During the FM broadcasts, radios in the local area around Blink could tune it to 87.9 FM to listen to the station live. An online broadcast was also available for some of the station's history, available via their website.
