= 104.0 FM =

FM radio frequency

The following radio stations broadcast on FM frequency 104.0 MHz:

== United Kingdom ==
- BBC CWR in Nuneaton
- BBC Hereford and Worcester in Kings Norton and Worcester
- BBC Radio Surrey in Crawley, Redhill and Reigate
- Ouse Valley Radio in Huntingdon
