= GLOSS FM =

Coordinates: 51.6091°N 2.5259°W

- Thornbury, Gloucestershire; England
- Broadcast area: Thornbury South Gloucestershire, UK

Programming
- Format: Music, Local Community interest

Ownership
- Owner: Thornbury Media CIC

History
- First air date: 19 November 2005
- Last air date: 2011

Links
- Website: www.glossfm.co.uk

GLOSS FM was an online community radio station in the United Kingdom, broadcasting to Thornbury and District, South Gloucestershire. Its strapline is "Your Local Station". It originally started broadcasting to the South Gloucestershire area on 19 April 2010. It was an extension of Thornbury FM, a smaller station broadcasting to just Thornbury which had started on 19 November 2005. In November 2009, the station relocated its transmitter which increased its coverage area. After an open competition GLOSS FM was chosen as the station's new name in order to be more relevant to all listeners. GLOSS FM legally broadcast under the terms of Ofcom's restricted service licence regime until the spring of 2011. This restricted the station to a maximum of two 28-day broadcasts per year in addition to its webcasts which were broadcast continually. In this year the station closed after an unsuccessful licence bid for a permanent FM frequency which was rejected by Ofcom due to "no suitable FM frequency available" in the area - an assertion which they have since indicated is not correct. After a 6-year break and several attempts to restart it, the station re-launched on 29 July 2017. The station rebranded to Thornbury Radio in November 2021.

== About the station ==
GLOSS FM is owned by Thornbury Media CIC, a community interest company, which is similar to a UK limited company except that a profit may not be extracted and all assets are locked within the company for use in the interests of the local community. GLOSS FM's aim is to be "Your Local Station" For Thornbury and district, South Gloucestershire, providing a community focus for Thornbury and District. This target area is smaller than the original GLOSS FM target area which also encompassed Yate - mainly due to the strong community identity of Thornbury and the fact that its population is increasing.

== Programming ==
GLOSS FM provides a range of programmes including news, sport, interviews, and music. It broadcasts 24 hours a day on the internet at www.GLOSSFM.co.uk.

== Technical ==
=== FM transmission (restricted service licence) ===
The past restricted service licence (RSL) transmissions on 87.7 MHz FM were with a comparatively low power of 25 watts ERP. The transmission site was moved in the Summer of 2009 from a low site in Thornbury town centre to a high site overlooking the Severn Vale and across to the Cotswold Way. The resulting coverage area was approximately doubled with this move, meaning that the station covered a potential audience of over 100,000 people in South Gloucestershire from Bradley Stoke in the south, to Berkeley in the north, and from Yate in the East to Chepstow in Wales. These temporary transmissions ceased in 2011 when Ofcom decided there was "no suitable FM frequency available" for permanent broadcasts.

The station re-started discussions with Ofcom in January 2017 about securing a permanent FM frequency. Most of their original technical issues have been cleared, but some remaining regulatory hurdles remain, and the issue is being escalated to the highest levels in Ofcom and Government.

It is hoped in 2018 an alternative route to radio broadcasting will become available through Ofcom's "Small Scale DAB" initiative. This should give an affordable route for small stations to broadcast on DAB which is currently dominated by Arqiva and is excessively expensive.

=== Webstream ===
GLOSS FM streams its output continuously on the Internet. The website has a listen now feature with advanced functionality including album art display, now playing, just played and song voting.
