= Chaine FM =

- Larne; Northern Ireland
- Frequency: 106.3 MHz

Programming
- Format: Restricted Service Licence

Ownership
- Owner: Larne Community Media Ltd.

History
- First air date: December 2007
- Last air date: December 2013

Links
- Website: www.chainefm.com

Chaine FM was an FM community radio station, based in Larne in Northern Ireland, that operated on an intermittent basis from 2007 until 2013. Operating as a "Christmas radio station" only, it broadcast seasonally from December 2007. After broadcasting in November and December 2010, the station did not broadcast during Christmas 2011 before returning in December 2012. It subsequently broadcast for the last time from 30 November to 24 December 2013. In June 2013, Ofcom granted the station a full-time Community Radio licence. However, in early 2015, Chaine FM's owner was reported to have "abandoned" its plans to operate a full-time station and returned this license to Ofcom. The station owner, Larne Community Media, was wound up in November 2015.

== History ==
Chaine FM evolved from Radio Moyle, a hospital radio station which began operating in 1986, broadcasting to the wards of Moyle Hospital in Larne.

Chaine FM was initially run by a non-for-profit community group, Chaine Music. The station applied for a Restricted Service Licence (RSL) in 2007, and rented accommodation in the Murryfield Shopping Centre in Larne town centre. From 2008 to 2013, the station operated from the former Radio Moyle studio at Moyle Hospital. In 2011, Chaine Music was disbanded and a new operating company, Larne Community Media Ltd, was formed.

In 2013, Chaine FM applied for a RSL licence from Ofcom and broadcast from 30 November 2013 until 24 December 2013. The operators of the station, Larne Community Media, gained an Ofcom Community Radio Licence in June 2013, and the station's operators were "looking for a launch" of a full-time station in early 2015.

However, in January 2015, Larne Community Media announced that it was not pursuing plans for a full-time community radio service, and the licence was returned to Ofcom. Later in 2015, the operating company announced that it was "winding up" owing to "resourcing and viability issues".
