= Riverside Radio =

Local radio station in London, England

Coordinates: 51.474°N 0.152°W

- England
- Broadcast area: South West London
- Frequency: 9A (South London DAB)

History
- First air date: 12 January 2015 (online as Wandsworth Radio); 1 August 2020 (DAB)

Links
- Webcast: play.riversideradio.com
- Website: www.riversideradio.com

Riverside Radio is a local radio station based in Battersea, London, which broadcasts local news, sports, music and specialist shows for the community of South West London online and on DAB.

== History ==
In May 2013 BBC Radio London presenter Jason Rosam held a public meeting at Battersea Arts Centre to encourage people to help him set up a radio station for the London Borough of Wandsworth. In 2014, a Crowdfunding campaign was launched with the aim of raising £3,000 for studio equipment and software.

Wandsworth Radio went live on 12 January 2015 with Martin Harris and Samantha Baines presenting the live launch show. The station was officially opened by Mayor of Wandsworth, Cllr Stuart Thom, the Battersea MP at the time Jane Ellison and founder Jason Rosam. Since launching the station became an important feature in the local community with the outside broadcast team will often presenting at local events across the borough. On its first anniversary in January 2016, the station launched a project to celebrate the diversity of Wandsworth by highlighting residents who were born outside of the UK to mark the first anniversary broadcasting.

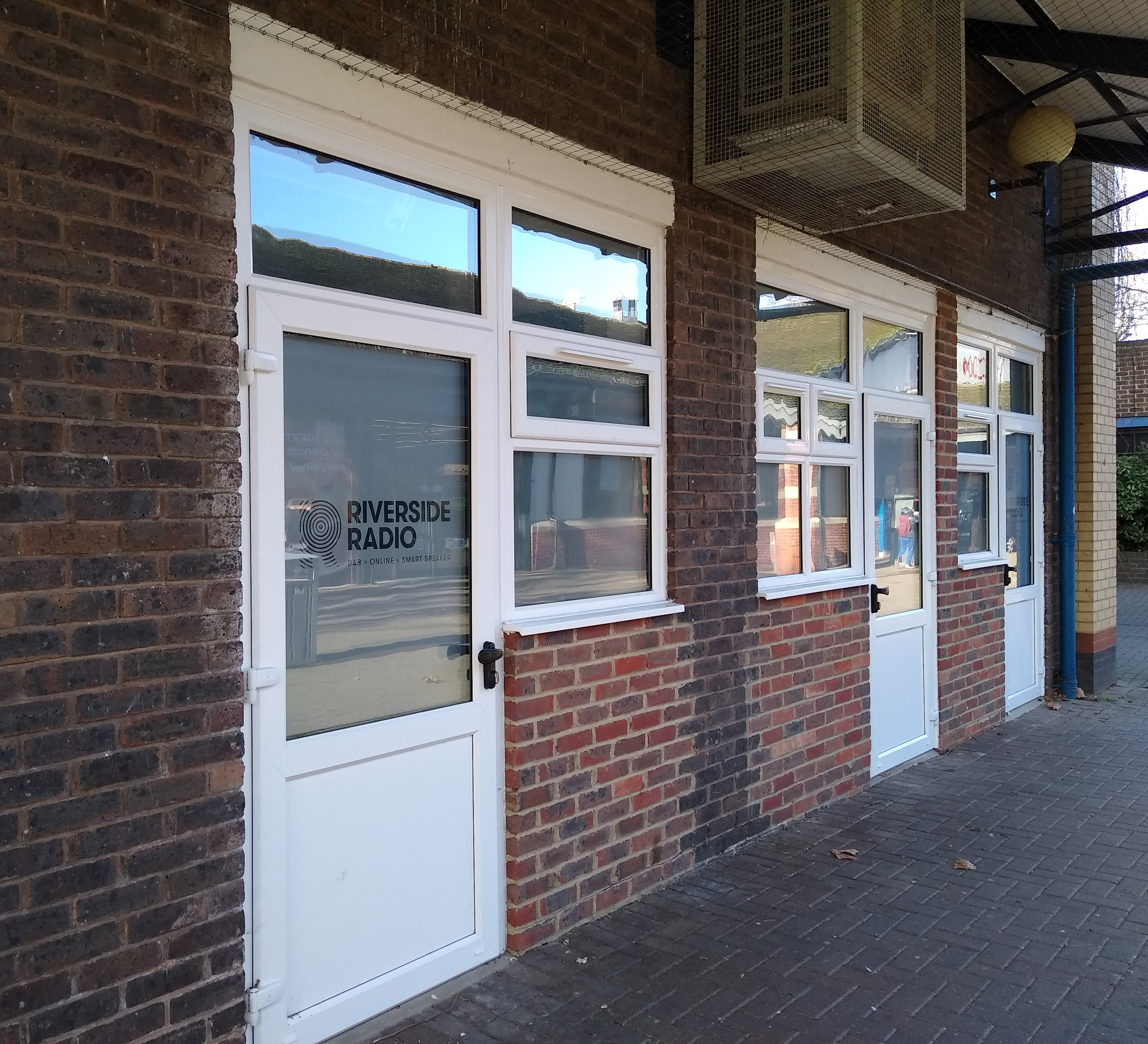
Riverside Radio studios

In October 2016, Wandsworth Radio applied to the regulator Ofcom for a community radio licence to broadcast on FM across the borough, however, this was turned down due to not being able to find a suitable FM frequency. In August 2017, Wandsworth Radio opened new purpose built studios at the Doddington and Rollo Business Centre in Battersea. On September 15, 2018 Wandsworth Radio was crowned the 'Digital/RSL Station of the Year' at the Community Radio Awards.

On 7 April 2019, the station re-branded as Riverside Radio to serve the boroughs of Wandsworth, Lambeth, Merton and Richmond with the slogan Switch on SW London.

On 1 August 2020, Riverside commenced broadcasting on DAB. On 1 November 2025, Riverside joined the South of the River DAB multiplex.

On 11 August 2026, it was announced that Riverside Radio would provide coverage of AFC Wimbledon's games throughout the 2026–27 football season.
