= Deep Sea Scouts =

- Owner: The Scout Association
- Country: United Kingdom
- Founded: 1928
- Website http://www.deepseascouts.org.uk

The Deep Sea Scouts (DSS) is a National Scout Active Support Unit of The Scout Association with the aim of connecting Scouting to the sea. It was originally formed in 1928 as an organisation enabling young people serving on British ships to participate in Scouting activities.

As Scouting matured in the early 20th century, along with its initial members, demands were made for additions to the organisation which would enable a continuing participation within the Scout Movement, and the Deep Sea Scouts were one such addition.

The decline in British shipping numbers, both naval and merchant, in the late 20th century was reflected in a reduction in DSS membership. Following a review, the DSS became a National Scout Fellowship in 1991 and was known as the Deep Sea Scout Fellowship. A subsequent national review of Scout Fellowships resulted in the creation of Scout Active Support, and the DSS was renamed back to Deep Sea Scouts in 2010.

== Original aims and purpose ==
As Baden-Powell, the founder of Scouting, noted in a letter to the fledgling group, "Damn rules! I want a jolly brotherhood through which I can get in touch with pals of my own or other ships or at ports of call — especially those pals who have the same Scouty ideas as I have ...". This was the purpose of the Deep Sea Scouts.

The original aims of the Deep Sea Scouts were:

- To enable Scouts afloat to get in touch with their brother/sister Scouts in ports throughout the world.
- To afford them the opportunity for continuing their Scouting activities in their sea-going profession.
- To provide an opportunity to hike and camp as Scouts, when on leave at home or abroad.
- To be of service to all, as the opportunity offers, particularly by instructing Cubs or Scouts, when in ports of call.

== Original eligibility for membership ==
Any member of The Scout Association was eligible for membership of the Deep Sea Scouts if they were serving in any of the following organisations:

- Royal Navy and Royal Naval Reserve
- Merchant Navy
- Royal Marines
- Royal National Lifeboat Institution
- Deep Sea Fishermen
- Deep Sea Rigs
- Deep Sea Yacht Crews
- Sail Training Ships

== Fellowship ==
Due to the decrease in shipping and the reductions in the Royal Navy, the numbers of Deep Sea Scouts fell quite dramatically, and it was decided that the organisation should become a Scout Fellowship. The Deep Sea Scout Fellowship (DSSF) was officially formed on 5 April 1991.

The DSSF maintained the same aims and entry requirements of its predecessor, but also allowed direct relatives of eligible members to join as long as they were active within the Scout Association.

== National Scout Active Support Unit ==
Following a review of all Scout Fellowships in the UK, the DSSF became a National Scout Active Support Unit with the aim of providing active support to the delivery of the programme for the youth sections of The Scout Association, whilst maintaining its international links and adult community activities worldwide.

== See also ==
Sea Scouts
