= 107 Meridian FM =

Coordinates: 51.13366°N 0.01423°W

East Grinstead; England
- Broadcast area: East Grinstead, Forest Row, Lingfield, Crawley Down, Felbridge
- Frequency: FM: 107.0 MHz

Programming
- Format: Community

History
- First air date: December 2006 (Restricted); March 2010 (Full-time)

Links
- Website: meridianfm.com

107 Meridian FM is a community radio station broadcasting to the West Sussex town of East Grinstead and its surrounding area.

== History ==
The station, a non-profit organisation, is run by around 100 unpaid volunteers and made its first 28-day restricted service licence broadcast in December 2006, followed by a couple more in May and December 2007.

Originally limited to two restricted service licence broadcasts each year, Meridian FM was awarded a full-time community radio licence by Ofcom in July 2009. The station then continued to stream over the internet via its website, whilst raising funds for the additional equipment needed for broadcast.

In February 2010, Ofcom inspected and approved the studios and transmission equipment, and 107 Meridian FM started officially broadcasting over 107Mhz FM on 1 March 2010 at 7am GMT. The station also broadcasts globally online.

In early 2015, Ofcom approved the renewal of 107 Meridian FM's broadcast licence until 2020. In early 2020, the broadcast licence was renewed until 2025. The studios were originally located in East Court Mansion together with the East Grinstead Town Council offices, but moved to the Jubilee Community Centre in Charlwoods Road in January 2010.

The station takes its name from the Greenwich Prime Meridian which runs through East Grinstead. It is unconnected with television broadcaster ITV Meridian.

The station is funded by membership fees, donations, advertising and sponsorship from local and national businesses.

== Awards ==
In 2016, The Business Show won a Bronze Award for Community Radio Show of the Year at the Community Radio Awards.

In 2017, Lila Bellamy won a Bronze Award for Young Person of the Year at the Community Radio Awards.

In 2018, the Spirit of Wildfire - A Festival for Radio show won a Bronze Award for Live Event or Outside Broadcast of the Year at the Community Radio Awards.

In 2018, 2019, 2020 & 2021, Leader's American Pie was runner-up Best Radio Show voted for by the readers of Americana UK.

== News ==
Meridian FM features an hourly national news bulletin, provided by Radio NewsHub, local news and weather, travel updates and local events guides.
