= Ujima Radio =

Radio station in Bristol, England

- Bristol; England
- Broadcast area: St Pauls
- Frequencies: FM: 98.0 MHz; DAB online

Ownership
- Owner: Ujima Radio CIC

History
- First air date: 2008

Links
- Webcast: Ujima Radio player
- Website: www.ujimaradio.com

Ujima Radio broadcasts on 98.0 FM across the City of Bristol within a 3 mile (5 Kilometre) radius of St Pauls.

== Change of ownership and commitments ==
Launched in 2008, Ujima Radio changed ownership in 2010 to Ujima CIC with a new management structure, after its parent company CEED went into receivership.

In 2013, Ujima Radio revised its commitment to Ofcom.

== Programming ==
The station provides a range of programmes designed specifically to meet the needs of the African-Caribbean community in the specified areas of Bristol. A broad spectrum of appeal ensures community support and participation. This includes news, arts and cultural programmes made by the community for the community. Plus training in radio production and media skills to support people living in areas of high deprivation, many of whom have been excluded from school and are Not in Education, Employment or Training.

Ujima Radio and BCFM joined forces in 2013 to launch the One Love Breakfast Show, a joint venture which broadcasts across both stations during weekdays, and in the same year was awarded ‘The Best Idea Into Action Award’ from VOSCUR.

Ujima Radio programming overview
——	Monday	Tuesday	Wednesday	Thursday	Friday	Saturday	Sunday
00:00 — 01:00			Nat Lee House Show		Velvet Magnetic (Velvet After Dark)	Gemmski (Soundsystem Culture)	DJ Xcel (Legends in the Mix)
01:00 — 02:00			Nat Lee House Show		Velvet Magnetic (Velvet After Dark)	Gemmski (Soundsystem Culture)	
02:00 — 03:00							
03:00 — 04:00							
04:00 — 05:00							
05:00 — 06:00							
06:00 — 07:00							
07:00 — 08:00							
08:00 — 09:00					The Rise Up Breakfast Show with Donald Mack		
09:00 — 10:00					The Rise Up Breakfast Show with Donald Mack		
10:00 — 11:00							
11:00 — 12:00							
12:00 — 13:00							
13:00 — 14:00							
14:00 — 15:00							
15:00 — 16:00							
16:00 — 17:00					The Word	True Definition	Muzikology
17:00 — 18:00					The Word	True Definition	Muzikology
18:00 — 19:00							
19:00 — 20:00							
20:00 — 21:00							
21:00 — 22:00							
22:00 — 23:00							
23:00 — 00:00							

As of 13 March 2026

== Awards ==
Year	Award	Ref(s)
2015	National Diversity Awards - Race, Faith & Religion	
2016	Community Radio Awards - Station of the Year	

Ujima Radio has also reached the shortlist for the Community Development Project of the Year section in the 2018 Community Radio Awards.

== Change of premises ==
Ujima Radio first opened its doors at Ujima House on Wilder Street in St Pauls, Bristol in 2008. After CEED went into receivership, Ujima Radio moved to The Station on Silver Street, Broadmead.
