= Scout Radio =

- Owner: The Scout Association
- Country: United Kingdom
- Founded: 2009
- Website https://scout.radio

Scout Radio is a National Scout Active Support Unit (NASU) of The Scout Association with the aim of supporting broadcast radio within scouting. It was initially formed in 2009 following the founding Manager Rebecca Steers and the founding members running Wings FM at the WINGS Jamboree, and received formal status as an NASU in 2012.

Since then the team has oprated numerous event radio stations, mainly for Jamborees under the Jam FM brand, be a source for news and interviews for senior members of Scouting, and provide resources to enable scouts to do radio to earn badges.

In August 2021, Ofcom granted Scout Radio a limited FM licence to broadcast fulltime from Gilwell Park from September of that year.
