= Erewash Sound =

Coordinates: 52.988764°N 1.306043°W

- England
- Broadcast area: Borough of Erewash, Derbyshire
- Frequencies: 96.8 & 103.5FM

Programming
- Format: Adult Contemporary

Ownership
- Owner: Erewash Sound CIC

History
- First air date: 6 March 2010

Links
- Webcast: Listen Live
- Website: ErewashSound.com

Erewash Sound is a community radio station broadcasting to the borough of Erewash in Derbyshire, including Ilkeston, West Hallam, Long Eaton, Borrowash and surrounding areas.

Following a short-term RSL broadcast in the summer of 2005, the station has broadcast via the Internet since 2007. In April 2008, the station was awarded a five-year community licence by OFCOM and launched on 96.8 FM on 6 March 2010 where it remains.

The station is run by local volunteers from across the borough and broadcasts from studios within the Media Centre on the site of the former Ormiston Ilkeston Enterprise Academy in Cotmanhay.

== History ==
The founding members of Erewash Sound first came together in 1997 and were involved in delivering six short-term 28-day RSL broadcasts as Pride FM in Derby between 1997 and 2002. In late 2004, the station brand Erewash Sound was launched and a 28-day RSL broadcast, supported by the area's local councillors and MP, took place in the summer of 2005. Following the success and popularity of the RSL broadcast, plans were made to apply for a full-time community radio licence as soon as the opportunity arose. In the meantime, the station began broadcasting via the Internet from January 2007 with its "At The Weekend" service dedicated to providing local news, sport and information alongside presenter-led music shows.

In October 2007, OFCOM invited applications for community licences from stations across the East Midlands. The Erewash Sound application was submitted and was accepted in April 2008, with OFCOM granting the station a five-year licence to broadcast to the borough of Erewash on FM.

The station continued with its online service until February 2010 before launching its full-time service online and on 96.8FM on Saturday 6 March 2010 at 9am. A launch day party was held for the station at Ilkeston Co-op in Ilkeston town centre with popular local-born actor Robert Lindsay as special guest.

The station commemorated its first anniversary of broadcasting on FM by returning to the Co-op Store in Ilkeston on Saturday 5 March 2011 for a special celebratory event.

On Monday 12 October 2020, the station launched on a second frequency, 103.5FM as well as 96.8FM with the new slogan, "Love Music – Love Erewash"

At 8am on Sunday 25 February 2024, presenter Richard Dawson began a 50-hour broadcasting marathon to raise awareness of the impact of preventing isolation through community and belonging, and £1,000 for two local charities. He finished the broadcast 52 hours later at 12pm on 27 February. By the following week, £2,000 had been raised for charity.

== Studios ==
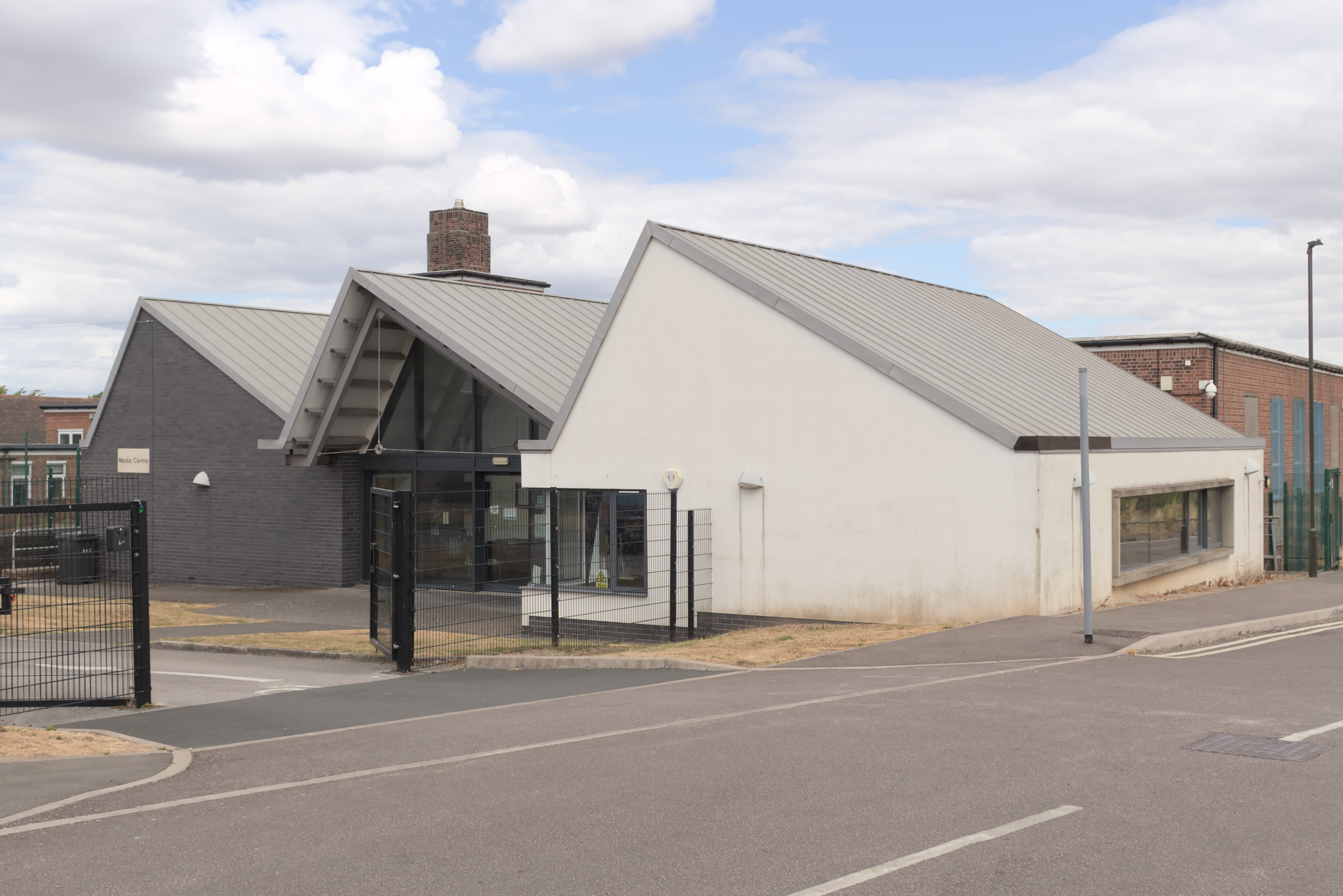
The Media Centre, August 2026

The Erewash Sound studios are based within the Media Centre of what was most recently the Ormiston Ilkeston Enterprise Academy in Cotmanhay, Ilkeston. From the station's FM launch in March 2010, the studio was sited in the former Headmaster's Study in B Block at the college. The station moved into its new specially built studio complex within the college's new Media Centre in January 2011 and the first show from the new studio was broadcast at 7am on Monday 31 January 2011. A new state of the art training studio was built within the existing complex and was officially opened in September 2018.

== Programming ==
Erewash Sound is committed to providing news and information of direct interest to its local audience. Local and national news is provided on the hour with additional dedicated local news weekdays at peak time and a sports bulletin each Sunday morning. Each of the station's mainstream shows also features details of local community events and initiatives plus general conversation on the local issues affecting people in the borough.

The station's music policy offers a wide variety of music to suit all tastes from the 1950s to present day. In addition, the station schedule also includes a specialist music show each evening incorporating alternative 80s, rock, 60s and 70s gold, local artists, youth programming, 90s, soul and disco, party, retro and even a weekly quiz show amongst mainstream music programming.

The station signed former Capital FM East Midlands Breakfast Show presenters, Dean "Dino" Weatherbed, Pete Allen and Anna Tyler to host Sunday evenings on the station from 30 August 2020 which ran until early 2021.

== Awards ==
Erewash Sound has been successful in recent years at the Community Radio Awards. Presenters at the station won four awards, from six nominations, in the 2018 awards with awards for presenters Mark Jarvis, Emma Snow and Jeannie Nicolas. The station was a winner again at the 2019 awards in two categories, with Emma Snow winning the Gold award for Best Young Presenter and Lewis Allsopp collecting bronze in the Newcomer of the Year category.

In December 2020, Tom Lamb won a bronze award in the 'Male Presenter of the Year' category at that year's Community Radio Awards.

In addition, the station as a whole was named 'Best Local Commercial Radio Station' in the East Midlands in the Midlands Enterprise Awards 2019.

Further recognition came in January 2020 when the radio station was declared 'Local Commercial Radio Station of the Year' in the CorporateLiveWire Innovation & Excellence Awards, then in October 2020, presenter David Allen was honoured with a Mayor of Erewash award for his contribution to society which also acknowledged his championing of the local theatre and arts scene both directly and on-air.
