= Scout Active Support =

- Scout Active Support logo
- Owner: The Scout Association
- Age range: 18+
- Country: United Kingdom
- Founded: June 1948
- Membership: 13,124 (Jan 2019)

Scout Active Support was a section of The Scout Association in the United Kingdom that provides support to delivering the youth programme of the Scouts. This support was carried out by Scout Active Support Units, which could be based at every level of the association with 35 national units (as of January 2020) and over 1,400 other units at county, district and group levels. The section has since closed in 2024 following transformation of the Scouts' volunteer experience which brought a number of changes to organisational structure nationally.

The section was first formed in 1948 as the B-P Guild of Old Scouts but was known as the Scout Fellowship between 1976 and 2009 when the current name of Scout Active Support was chosen to more accurately reflect the aims of the section as it was changed to make them more proactive and flexible.

The support offered by Scout Active Support Units varied depending on their focus and specialism but generally focused on either programme delivery to young people, such as through instruction in scout skills, bushcraft, adventurous activities, event delivery and faith exploration or on the development of Scouting through events and administrative help.

== History ==
=== B-P Guild: 1947–1976 ===
Forty years after the first Scout camp on Brownsea Island in 1907, the International Scout Conference held in France in August 1947 recommended the creation of associations for Old Scouts by each national Scout associations with a target for this to be achieved by the following year when the 40th anniversary of the official start of the movement (as considered at the time) was to be celebrated. Three months later in November, a British Old Scouts Conference was held at Gilwell Park which planned out the creation of the new organisation, with a membership made up of old Scouts at group and district level and distinct and separate from the training sections within the Boy Scouts at the time. The new B-P Guild of Old Scouts was launched in June 1948.

Five years later in October 1953, a review was made of the organisation as the Guild was not as involved with the Boy Scouts Association as originally hoped which led to the guild being split into its own separate organisation with their own constitution, elected council and committee. As part of the split, £1,000 was gifted by the Boy Scouts to the new Guild which was repaid two years later. The Scouts and the new Guild would share each others publications, liaise at all levels, share responsibility for recruiting within the Scouts and their leaders. The Scouts would urge all former Scouts to join the guild and in return each Guild branch would perform services to local Scouts as much as they were able. It coincided with the creation of the International Scout and Guide Fellowship, of which the Guild was a founder member adopting their badge in June 1957.

The Guild was renamed the B-P Scout Guild in May 1955 as it moved to admit members who had not been Scouts which was achieved in June 1958. At this time, the Guild were also given their own camp site at Gilwell Park, Ferryman field, and built their own chalet on the site which stood from 1961 to 1995.

As they were not a part of the association at the time, the B-P Scout Guild were not subject to any changes as a result of The Chief Scout's Advance Party Report, although a Scout Supporters Association was recommended to be established in every district that would include all adults involved with Scouting in that area and which would include guild members. This recommendation was approved in principle but would require further research. The guild would re-join the newly renamed Scout Association in April 1971.

=== Scout Fellowship: 1976–2009 ===
In May 1974 the role of the B-P Scout Guild was examined as part of a wider report into the future of adult support in Scouting. This resulted in the creation of the Scout Fellowship in October 1976 which replaced the Guild, service teams and other supporting organisations with a new district level grouping. As Fellowship began to grow it brought in other elements of the movement such as the Deep Sea Scouts in April 1991.

As part of a wider review of the entire Scout movement in the late 1990s a number of changes to the Scout Fellowship occurred in 1999. A 1998 National Conference led to the development of a new plan and a motto for the group: 'providing active support' which was solidified the following year when the Scout Fellowship was made a full part of The Scout Association and integrated under the auspices of Adult Support. This move meant that the Fellowship, now a part of the World Organization of the Scout Movement, is no longer a member of the International Scout and Guide Fellowship. It gained a new sectional logo along with the wider Scout rebranding of 2002.

=== Scout Active Support: 2009–2024 ===
In September 2009 the Scout Fellowship was renamed as 'Scout Active Support', following a three year review that revealed some aspects of Scout Fellowship were working while other aspects were more confused by other members which resulted in the name change to make it clearer what the purpose of the section was. Following the rebrand, Scout Active Support was promoted as a flexible way for people to volunteer with the Scouts without the full-time commitment needed to be a regular leader.

=== Following transformation: 2024-present ===
As of the Scout Association's transformation project, which introduced a number of changes to the volunteer experience, Scout Active Support Units will not continue in their current form. Instead, sub-teams will be used to organise volunteers under the new team structure. Those in, for example, a SASU specialising in hillwalking, could join a programme sub-team for hillwalking. New sub-teams could also be created to accommodate SASU volunteers.

== Organisation ==
Scout Active Support was open to all adults over 18 years of age, including leaders with other sections and members of the Scout Network, subject to satisfactory checks under the Scout Association Child Protection Policy. Scout Active Support members could choose whether to become full or associate members of the Scout Association and wear Scout uniform that is identical to other adult members with the addition of an identifying badge. There was no requirement that members have been involved in the movement before joining and in recent years Scout Active Support have been promoted as a flexible way in which to volunteer with the movement for those who are unable or unwilling to commit to more regular voluntary work.

Scout Active Support Units could be run at a local level by Scout groups, districts and counties or equivalent with a Scout Active Support Manager in charge and an annually reviewed service agreement in place to specify the activities of the unit. The minimum standards of a unit is deliberately limited to having leadership in place and that the unit provided an active support service to Scouting in some fashion. These local units were also overseen by the relevant local manager, such as Group Scout Leaders or Commissioners, who supported it to ensure it met its objectives. Some local units included the term 'Scout Active Support Unit' in their name while others call their unit by another name and only include their identification as a Scout Active Support Unit on letterheads or formal communications.

A small number of units which operate nationally can apply to be a National Scout Active Support Unit which operated in the same way as a local unit with the Deputy UK Commissioner for Programme (Support) taking the place of the local manager, with the Assistant UK Commissioner for Programme (Scout Active Support) co-ordinating the registration of these groups with headquarters and agreeing the three-yearly service agreement. Aside from this, these units had a manager in similar fashion to local units.

== National Scout Active Support Units ==
National Scout Active Support Units were groups of volunteers who have formed an Active Support Unit registered directly with the Scout Association and include special interest, activity centre, faith-based and international organisations.

=== Special Interest ===
The majority of groups were broad in membership and instead focused on providing support for a particular activity or supporting large events.

- Admiral Lord Nelson - supports Sea Scouts and in particular runs the four main events for Royal Navy affiliated Sea Scout groups: a swimming gala, summer camp, soccer tournament and Explorer Scout camp.
- Amateur Radio SASU - runs amateur radio and communications activities including supporting Jamboree on the Air.
- Brownsea Island SASU - operates a trading post and museum at Brownsea Island Scout camp.
- Bushscout UK SASU - co-ordinates bushcraft instructors and trains volunteers in practical skills.
- Deep Sea Scouts — aims to connect Scouting to the sea and originally had an aim of connecting Scouts on ships around the world such as those in the Merchant Navy or Royal Navy.
- Duke of Edinburgh's Award Training - co-ordinates the trainers for the DofE award scheme to advertise and promote the award to Scouts.
- FLAGS SASU - provides active support to those associated with Scouting regarding lesbian, gay, bisexual and transgender issues
- National Caving SASU - co-ordinates and promotes caving.
- National Scout Fellowship Security Team — provides security for Scouting and Guiding events
- Nationwide Scout Communications Team SASU - providing Radio Communications and Telephones for Scout Events, Jamborees and International Camps.
- Queen's Scout Working Party SASU — a group for Queen's Scouts that assists with the running of major national Scout Association events.
- SCAFELL— Scout Climbing Activities Active Support Unit SASU - supports climbing related activities and training.
- Scout 4x4 - The national team for providing 4x4 activities to UK Scouts.
- Scout and Guide Graduate Association - provides activities for those who have been members of both movements.
- Scout Content SASU - produces content for marketing and communications as well as training other volunteers in these skills and supports big events.
- Scout Radio SASU - The national team for all things broadcast radio within Scouting in the UK including event based radio stations, or support & guidance to those running them.
- Scout Tech SASU — providing internet and technology services at events
- ScoutMed SASU — provides on site first aid and medical services at Scouting and Guiding events
- Supporting Assessors SASU - supports activity and nights away assessors through workshops.
- UK Programme Support - delivers information and programme support at large events and leader training.

=== Adventure Centre ===
These units provide support to the national Scout Adventures centres.

- 2nd Gilwell Park SASU — a service team to support Gilwell Park
- Scout Adventures Downe SASU — supports Downe Scout Adventure Centre on the border of Kent and Greater London.
- Scout Adventures Great Tower SASU - supports Great Tower Scout Adventure Centre in Cumbria.
- Scout Adventures Hawkhirst SASU - supports Hawkhirst Scout Adventure Centre in Northumberland.
- Scout Adventures Youlbury SASU - provides support to Youlbury Scout Adventure Centre in Oxfordshire.

=== Faith ===
These organisations promote and support Scouting and Guiding within their faith.

- Anglican Fellowship in Scouting and Guiding SASU - supporting leaders in Scouting and Guiding and the clergy.
- Association of Methodist Scouters and Guiders - supporting members in the Methodist church.
- Muslim Scout Fellowship SASU - aims to support and bring Scouting to the Muslim communities of the UK.
- National Catholic Scout Fellowship SASU - supporting members of Scouting in the Catholic Church.
- National Jewish Scout Fellowship (currently inactive) - supports Jewish members of Scouting, organises event and social gatherings and provides the Scout Association with feedback from a Jewish perspective.
- United Reformed Church Guide and Scout Fellowship is a national fellowship in the United Kingdom that works with members of Guide and Scout groups who are affiliated with the United Reformed Church, as well as members of the United Reformed Church who have an interest in Guiding or Scouting. It hosts camps for both Guides and Scouts, and has previously organised a national Fellowship of United Reformed Youth camp. It aims to provide leaders of all Scouting/Guiding Sections with resources to engage with the Faiths And Beliefs side of the programme and produces a magazine, "Linkline".

=== International ===
These organisations support members interested in Scouting around the world. Some are considered Special Interest Groups by the International Scout Support Unit.

- Arab Region SASU
- Asia-Pacific Scout Region SASU
- Boy Scouts of America Camps
- East and West Africa Scout Region SASU
- Eric Frank Trust
- Eurasian Scout Support
- Friends of Scouting Europe
- Interamerican Scout Region SASU
- International Scout Support Unit
- Kandersteg International Scout Centre SASU
- Scout Expedition Team
- Scout and Guide Fellowship UK
- Scouts Against Malaria

== See also ==
- Scout Network
- International Scout and Guide Fellowship
- Trefoil Guild, equivalent section in Girlguiding
- Scout Adventures (The Scout Association)
