= BCfm =

BCfm - Bristol Community FM

Bristol; England
- Broadcast area: Bristol
- Frequency: 93.2fm

Ownership
- Owner: Bristol Community Fm Ltd

History
- First air date: 26 March 2007

Links
- Webcast: BCFM player
- Website: http://www.bcfmradio.com

BCfm or Bristol Community FM is a community radio station broadcasting to the City of Bristol in the United Kingdom on 93.2 FM. BCfm started broadcasting on 26 March 2007. This followed many years of community development and radio projects in Bristol, such as radio19 (the New Deal for Communities), Commonwealth fm and B200fm (Celebration of Brunel's life). During the summer period of 2009, BCFM used funding provided by the Youth Opportunities Fund to build a brand new studio to cater to the growing number of presenters working at the station. Studio 2, also known as "Blue Studio," was built next to the current Studio 1 and allows live presenting from either studio with both having the ability to pre-record shows.

BCfm broadcasts in nine different languages and aims to represent the whole of Bristol and Bristol life. A significant amount of local music is played. Broadcasts are webcasts, and several of podcasts are available on the website. Broadcasts to the local Somali, Polish and Spanish-speaking communities also feature. In addition, BCfm programming is carried by BBC Radio Bristol overnight at weekends.

== Programming ==
Ujima Radio and BCFM joined forces in 2013 to launch the One Love Breakfast Show, a joint venture which broadcasts across both stations during weekdays, and in the same year was awarded ‘The Best Idea Into Action Award’ from VOSCUR.

== Awards ==
Radio Station Awards

Year	Award
2010	Best Small Station in the South West (Nations & Regions Awards)
2013	The Best Idea Into Action Award (VOSCUR)
2013	Improving People's Lives Award (BME Community Award)
2014	Best Small Station in the South West (Nations & Regions Awards)
2014	Best Small Station in the South West (Nations & Regions Awards)
