= Marlow FM =

Radio station in Buckinghamshire, England

Coordinates: 51°33′53″N 0°45′41″W

Marlow FM 97.5 is a community radio station serving Marlow, Buckinghamshire in the United Kingdom. Marlow FM broadcasts on a Community Radio licence and has done so since May 11, 2011, while the station previously broadcast as a webcast for four years and trialled a Restricted Service Licence before being licensed to use FM in 2007 and again in 2009. The station may be heard online and by tuning to 97.5 FM in the Marlow area.

== Management ==
The station is run by MarlowFM Ltd, a not-for-profit private limited company, with a directors board consisting of seven directors and an Operations Group who collectively oversee the day-to-day management of the station. Marlow FM has in excess of 140 volunteers who help maintain the station's output.

== Broadcast times and material ==
Marlow FM broadcasts over 90 hours of live or recorded-live shows weekly. Its team present shows from 7:00 am to 11:00 pm, Monday to Friday, with music playing automatically overnight. Regular shows are the breakfast, mid-morning, lunch time and drive time shows, and the station also produces specialist programs which play alternative, Americana, blues, classic rock, country, dance, drum and bass, folk, indie, jazz, pop, R&B, rock and roll, soul, trance, underground and world genres. It also has a Health and Wellbeing show as well as talk slots about Marlow's past, present and future.

After drivetime (5–7 pm), a number of specialist shows are broadcast.
