= Drystone Radio =

Radio station in Cowling, North Yorkshire, England

- Broadcast from Cowling.; England
- Broadcast area: Craven & Wharfedale
- Frequencies: 103.5 FM (Craven) & 102 FM (Wharfedale) DAB+ (Bradford area)

Programming
- Format: Community

History
- First air date: 16 January 2009

Links
- Webcast: Stereo 128kbps
- Website: www.drystoneradio.com

Drystone Radio, operating online and on frequencies of 103.5 FM (formerly 106.9 FM) and 102.0 FM, is a not-for-profit community radio station operating from Cowling, North Yorkshire to listeners across Craven, Wharfedale and parts of the southern Yorkshire Dales.

== Purpose ==
Drystone Radio operates to provide media access to local music, news, issues and interests. The radio's mission statement includes mention of its community involvement, and social inclusion, diversity, and skills development.

== History ==
Drystone Radio was founded by David Adams, and initially broadcast over the internet on his website. Drystone Radio became incorporated 1 October 1998 and registered as a charity 29 June 2007. Ofcom awarded the station a five-year licence in 2007, and in January 2009 the station began broadcasting to South Craven and the Yorkshire Dales on 106.9 FM.

In March 2012, Drystone Radio revised its schedule to include regular weekday programming including Breakfast, Mid-day and Drivetime shows. Schedules have been updated to take specialist shows into the evenings and weekends.

The main broadcast studio underwent a complete refurbishment during the summer of 2012, and played host to an ITV film crew for the second time as they filmed for an episode of The Dales, due for broadcast early in 2013. The station attracted national attention on the first occasion as they filmed Crazy Daisy, who was hailed as the UK's youngest radio presenter when her career was launched at Drystone Radio at the age of nine.

=== 2014 frequency change ===
In January 2014 the station implemented its plans to change frequency to 103.5 FM. The frequency change was completed 30 January 2014, coinciding with the introduction of new imaging and a new website for the station. Ofcom noted that the change of frequency was authorised to resolve interference issues.

Drystone Radio attended the Silsden Gala in 2013.

As of April 2016, Drystone's licence runs to 15 January 2019.

In 2017 Drystone won the Gold award for best outside broadcast at the Community Radio Awards for live coverage of the Tour de Yorkshire cycle race.

=== 2020 license extension ===
In the summer of 2020, following a power increase on the Sutton-in-Craven transmitter and subsequent improvement to the robustness to the service in Craven on 103.5 FM, Drystone Radio was awarded an extension to its license to serve the neighbouring district of Ilkley. This license extension was awarded by OFCOM and the station aired on 102 FM across the Wharfedale Valley on Saturday 7 November 2020 with a special set of programmes for launch day. The extension to serve the neighbouring districts in West Yorkshire also brought opportunities to broadcast from a new studio in the Ilkley’s Clarke Foley Centre, with some specialist programmes, features and interviews being broadcast from the centre’s studio.

== Awards ==
In 2018 Drystone Radio reached the shortlist for the Community Radio's Awards Station of the Year, as well as entries in the Volunteer of the Year and Newcomer categories.

In 2017 Drystone Radio received Gold award for Outside Broadcast of the Year at the Community Radio Awards.

In 2016 Drystone Radio received A Gold award for Station Sound and Marketing at the Community Radio Awards.
