= NLive Radio =

Northampton local radio station

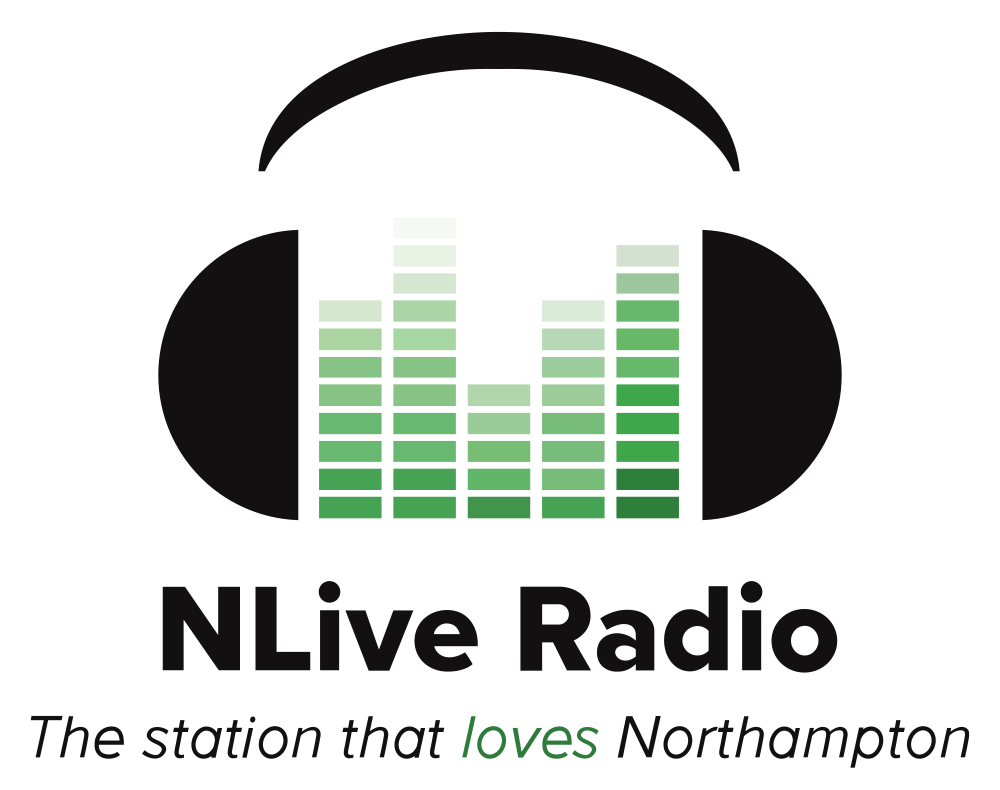
- England
- Broadcast area: Northampton
- Frequencies: 106.9; DAB: 9A (Rugby+Daventry)

Programming
- Format: Local / Community Radio

Ownership
- Owner: University of Northampton

History
- First air date: 1 November 2016
- Former names: NNBC

Technical information
- Licensing authority: Ofcom
- Transmitter coordinates: 52°14′11″N 0°54′21″W

Links
- Webcast: via RadioFeeds.co.uk
- Website: NLiveRadio.com

NLive Radio is a local community radio station for Northampton, in the United Kingdom. It was originally founded as NNBC. The station is owned by the University of Northampton, and is operated with editorial independence with the aims to serve the town of Northampton.

== History ==
In October 2016, the station launched on-air as a joint project between the community of Northampton and the University of Northampton, with the aim to provide a local radio service for everyone across Northampton, as well as help the university with its aim to serve its local community and be part of the cultural fabric of the town.

In September 2019, the station announced that Rebecca Steers had become the Station Manager with a vision to grow and develop the station.

In December 2019, the station released a version of Do They Know It's Christmas? in aid of the KidsAid charity. It also hosted political coverage of the results of the 2019 United Kingdom general election.

In March 2020, teenage-presenter Will Oelrich was nominated for a 'BBC Sounds Rising Talent 16-18' Young Audio award.

In July 2020, the station distributed free radio sets to vulnerable residents.

In June 2021, it was announced that the station had been successful in its application to extend its license by 5 years the station also released an updated logo with a new strapline of "The station that loves Northampton".

== Transmitter ==
When the station launched as NNBC, the transmitter was based at the University of Northampton Park campus, but was then moved to the University Innovation Centre in 2018, when the station relaunched as NLive.

The transmitter is currently on the roof of The Mounts fire station in Northampton.

The station also broadcasts on the Rugby and Daventry SSDAB service
