= Mayor of High Wycombe =

The High Wycombe Mayoralty is unique in that the mayor and officers are traditionally weighed every year.

The Mayor of High Wycombe, a town in Buckinghamshire, England, is chosen each year at the annual meeting of the charter trustees. The charter trustees of the town of High Wycombe are councillors elected for town wards, who have a ceremonial role as charter trustees in addition to their district council responsibilities.

Annually, one of the charter trustees is nominated by their peers to be mayor of the town.

The office of mayor is apolitical and the person represents the town at many civic and ceremonial events, both in the town and at other functions outside the town/district.

== Tolling out and weighing-in ==
Connected with the election of a new mayor in High Wycombe are the customs of 'tolling out' and 'weighing-in'.

The former, which ceased with the Municipal Corporations Act 1835 arose from the behaviour of Mr. Henry Shepard in 1678 who was reported as being drunk and misbehaving himself.

It was decreed that the great bell should be rung out in testimony of his misdemeanours. So according to this ancient custom the old mayor was tolled out by tolling the great bell on the morning of the new mayor's election. The party then proceeded in state to church, and afterwards a drummer who continued to drum the old mayor out preceded the procession, although this tradition was lost at some point and only reintroduced in 1999. This was followed by the weighing-in ceremony, which took place in the bar Iron Warehouse in White Hart Street.

The weighing process is recorded and the result compared to the weight at the end of the mayoral year. For each of the mayor and corporation, if there has been a weight gain in that year, the person is considered to have been gaining that weight at the taxpayers' expense; they would be jeered and booed, historically accompanied with thrown tomatoes and rotten fruit.
