= Môn FM =

Radio station in Llangefni, Wales

MônFM
- Llangefni; Wales
- Broadcast area: Anglesey and North Gwynedd
- Frequencies: 96.8, 102.1 & 102.5 FM MHz, Online

Programming
- Languages: Welsh; English
- Format: Community: music and talk

Ownership
- Owner: Gwy-Môn Media Ltd

History
- First air date: 12 July 2014

Links
- Website: MônFM

MônFM is a bilingual community radio station serving Anglesey (Welsh: Ynys Môn) and northern Gwynedd.

The station is owned and operated by Gwy-Môn Media and broadcasts on 96.8, 102.1 and 102.5 FM and online from studios in Llangefni town centre.

== Overview ==
MônFM broadcasts around 100 hours a week of locally-oriented programming in English and Welsh, including music and talk output, local news & current affairs, sport, specialist music shows and events coverage.

Most of MônFM's programming is produced and presented locally by volunteers, except for national news bulletins produced by Sky News Radio in London 24 hours a day.

The station's FM signal also extends to cover large parts of north Gwynedd. In recent years, MônFM's editorial content has been expanded beyond its primary Anglesey TSA (target service area) to provide ample coverage of the mainland county. In 2021, the station's official TSA was expanded to include northern Gwynedd.

== History ==
Following an RSL transmission on 87.9 FM for the Llangefni area in March 2012, the station continued to produce online output before being granted a full-time licence in August 2013, allowing MônFM to broadcast across most of the island via a transmitter at Gwalchmai. Full-time broadcasting on 102.5 FM and online began at 8a.m. on Saturday 12 July 2014.

In March 2019, the broadcast regulator OFCOM extended the station's FM licence for a further five years. A further five-year licence renewal followed in May 2024.

In August 2019, OFCOM granted permission for MônFM to expand its FM coverage area by building two new transmitters at Penmynydd and Nebo. The station began broadcasting on 96.8 FM from the Penmynydd transmitter, targeting eastern Anglesey and north Gwynedd, on 6 May 2021.

On 25 May 2021, MônFM opened its third FM transmitter at Nebo, near Amlwch, serving north Anglesey on 102.5 FM. As a result, the Gwalchmai transmitter, serving west Anglesey, moved its frequency to 102.1 FM.

In October 2019, the station won a Gold award for its live sports programme, MônFM Sport, at the annual Community Radio Awards. The following year, MônFM picked up Bronze in the Station of the Year category.

In October 2025, the station won its second Community Radio Awards Gold for live coverage of the annual Gŵyl Cefni festival in Llangefni.
