= Andover Radio =

Coordinates: 51.2054°N 1.4779°W

- Andover; England
- Broadcast area: Andover and surrounding villages
- Frequency: FM: 95.9 MHz

Programming
- Language: English
- Format: Community Radio
- Affiliations: Local Radio Alliance

History
- First air date: 22 April 2018

Links
- Webcast: www.loveandover.com/player
- Website: www.loveandover.com

Andover Radio is a community radio station in Andover, Hampshire in the United Kingdom. It broadcasts on 95.9 FM and online. The station was awarded a five-year licence to broadcast from Ofcom in 2016. The radio station launched with the financial support of local businesses, private investment and the local borough council. The station first aired on 22 April 2018, opened by Chris Britton, guitarist of Andover's notable rock band The Trans.
