= Thistle TV =

Defunct television channel in Lanarkshire, United Kingdom

- Country: United Kingdom
- Broadcast area: Lanarkshire

Programming
- Language: English

Ownership
- Owner: Thistle Television Ltd

History
- Launched: 11 April 1999
- Replaced: Lanarkshire TV
- Closed: 17 May 2005 (6 years, 36 days)

Availability (at time of closure)

Terrestrial
- Black Hill transmitting station: Channel 48

Thistle TV was a locally broadcast commercial television station for Lanarkshire, Scotland, which launched as "Lanarkshire TV", and operated from April 1999 until May 2005.

== Lanarkshire TV ==
Lanarkshire TV (LTV) was set up with a £2,000, four-year licence from the ITC and was the model for up to 60 other local television stations that were expected to start transmitting in subsequent years. The channel began broadcasting on 11 April 1999.

Ahead of its launch, managing director John MacKenzie told The Herald newspaper: "LTV will cover both local and national issues which directly or indirectly affect the people of Lanarkshire."

The station broadcast from the former Hartwood Hospital near Shotts, which had previously been used as a mental health facility. Because of that link, the channel was often dubbed "Loony TV".

Broadcasting on Channel 67 from its own transmitter near Hartwood, it was on 24 hours a day, offering local news, chat shows and weather and travel bulletins. It also broadcast a mixture of locally produced programmes and newer films. It also aired content such as a talent show called "Talented Lanarkshire", a quiz programme called Remote Control, which was once broadcast from Lanark Grammar School, and a local constable appealing for witnesses in a small-scale version of Crimewatch. Tall Tales had a puppet called "Bookworm" reading to the under-fives. And the nature slot, Animal Magic, saw a camera crew dispatched to the zoo. The cookery programme amounted to a visit to a local restaurant, where the chef of the house cooks a meal. The station was the first to cater to a strictly local audience and hoped to be a model for other similar services. In November 1999, it signed an agreement with TMH, which represented advertising on local television stations in the UK at the time, joining TV12 in the Isle of Wight and C9TV in Northern Ireland.

=== Financial problems ===
Less than a year after launch, it was reported in March 2000 that the station was nearing closure because of financial problems. The failure to pay any of its 32 staff since Christmas Eve 1999, prompted Shereen Tulloch, the breakfast show anchor, to leave suddenly. Her colleagues said she left "to become a weather girl in London" but, whatever the reason, it spelt the end of Good Morning Lanarkshire. Since the beginning of March 2000, LTV broadcasts began at 4pm. At the same time, it moved from Hartwood to a building at Newhouse Industrial Estate, close to the premises of the newly-founded CLAN FM. Its relocation didn't help recovering its fortunes and its signal.

Despite heavy criticism from newspapers, the ITC heaped praise on the station. Speaking to the Independent newspaper, one ITC staff member commented:

"The problem is that the management was overambitious at the beginning, trying to broadcast from 8am till midnight, with 90 per cent of the output home produced. But there is still a lot of commitment to make this work."

By December 2001, the company shut down.

== Thistle TV ==
Thistle TV replaced Lanarkshire TV in 2003, beginning its test transmissions on 12 October, this time on channel 48. The station covered 650,000 potential viewers. It launched on 7 November with programming from 12pm to midnight. Programming was mainly local, but also had the possibility of exchanging with other local television stations. The new service was broadcast to a wider catchment area, extending southwards from Airdrie to include much of East Kilbride, Hamilton, Motherwell, Wishaw, Larkhall, Strathaven and rural areas of South Lanarkshire, and interspersed its local material with simulcasts of Sky News and the QVC shopping channel. However, it failed to attract enough investors or advertisers and stopped broadcasting in May 2005, under the grounds that its signal was too weak to justify its operations.

== Programmes ==
In 2004, Thistle TV produced three programmes:

- High Volume was the station's irregular music show, used as a platform for local talents.
- Serious About Films... was a short film programme hosted by Eddie Harrison, where viewers sent in their submissions.
- Hot Stuff was presented by Marrion Forrest and was dedicated to the week's new film and music releases.

In addition to these programmes (some of which were broadcast on an irregular basis), the station relayed Sky News and QVC, as well as its current affairs programmes Lanarkshire Live and Talk Now, classic films (mostly in the public domain) including some Charlie Chaplin titles and The Three Stooges shorts.
