= YouthBank UK =

YB UK official logo, adapted by many local YouthBanks.

YouthBank UK (YB UK) was a national grant scheme in the United Kingdom, providing small 'Opportunity' grants from £250 to £5,000 from the Youth Opportunity Fund (YOF) and Larger grants from £5,000 to £25,000 from the Youth Capital Fund (YCF) grants for young people to help individuals and groups fund projects to help the community. Both YB UK and local groups are led and run completely by young people usually with a Youth bank project manager as part of a County Council, helping them learn new skills, meet their needs and aid their communities. YB UK puts the money in the hands of young people, and is run at both a local area and national level by groups of young people, but adults can help as supporters, facilitators and advisors. YB UK is a registered charity, registered charity number, 1113047.

YouthBank UK went into the administration process in 2011 due to financial difficulty.

YouthBank Scotland has continued with the support of Youthlink Scotland to support the network of YouthBanks in Scotland. YouthBank Ireland has also continued to move forward, however had started to move away from YouthBank UK before it went into administration.

== Background and history ==
In 1999, five organisations, British Youth Council, Changemakers, the Community Foundation Network, the National Youth Agency and The Prince's Trust, who becameYB UK's consortium partners, set up seven pilot YouthBanks, in Bristol, Bradford, Highlands and Islands of Scotland, Northern Ireland, Northumberland, Tyne and Wear and Wales. In September 2001, YB UK was successful in securing a million pound, grant from the Community Fund, to develop a Central Development Unit to expand the pilot YB UK projects.

YB UK received major grants from Comic Relief, the Football Foundation, the Department for Education and Skills and Skills National Voluntary Youth Organisation and the Big Lottery Fund's Young People Fund Grants to Organisation programme.

== Local YouthBanks ==
After the seven projects received funding via the Community Fund, a Central Development Unit was established to help increase the number of local YouthBanks all around the UK. Youth groups from anywhere in the country can now apply to become a YouthBank for their area. Once a group becomes a YouthBank, they decide how applications are designed and assessed, and decide who receives the grants.

== List of local YouthBanks ==
Below is a list of areas that have a functioning YouthBank, according to the official website.

England

- East Brighton
- Camden
- Harlow
- Peterborough
- Tower Hamlets
- Norfolk
- Buckinghamshire
- Bristol
- Somerset
- Exeter
- Leicestershire
- Nottinghamshire
- Heywood
- Old Trafford
- Sefton
- Salford
- Bradford
- Keighley
- Stockton-on-Tees
- Northumberland Tyne and Wear
- Allerdale
- North East Lincolnshire
- Bath and North East Somerset
- East Sussex

Wales

- Pembrokeshire
- Rhyl

Northern Ireland

- Craigavon
- Foyle
- Ballymena
- Newtownabbey
- St. Gabriels School
- Girls Model School

Scotland

- Dumfries and Galloway
- Scottish Borders
- Tranent
- North Glasgow
- Drumchapel
- Greater Easterhouse
- Helensburgh
- Stirling
- Inverness
- Ross and Cromarty
- Nairnshire
- Moray
- Fraserburgh
- Sutherland
- Caithness
- Shetland
- North Ayrshire
- East Fife
