= Ipswich Community Radio =

Ipswich; England
- Frequency: 105.7 FM
- RDS: ICR

Programming
- Format: Community radio

History
- First air date: 2007

Links
- Website: www.icrfm.com

Ipswich Community Radio (ICR FM) is a community radio station in Ipswich, Suffolk. It was awarded a full-time FM licence in 2006, and began broadcasting on 105.7 FM in 2007.

The basic format of the station is to provide an output that is not in the mainstream and give people open opportunities to be on air through training courses. Content includes alternative music genres, speech and other locally sourced programmes.

Ipswich Community Radio broadcasts its live content from studios and transmitters in the town. From 2012 until 2023 the studio was in Turret Lane in Ipswich and the FM transmitter located in the Chantry area.

In 2023, the studios were relocated to Tower Street in Ipswich.

In 2015, the station was added to the RadioPlayer platform.

In 2016, the station went through a lot of major changes including the move of the transmitter after 2015 building work at Chantry High School meant a reduction in coverage. April 2016, this was rectified and the full service on FM is now restored. The station has now noticeably moved to icrfm.com on the web too.

In late 2016, the station launched ICR XMAS, a 24-hour Christmas music station, and then in 2017 launched online station ICR Flip.

In early 2025, the FM transmitter was relocated to a much higher location to the East of the town, and Ofcom (after consultation with RDI (Netherlands) and BIPT (Belgium)) authorised a power increase - the station can now be received on FM across East Suffolk and as well as its existing coverage areas of Ipswich, Babergh, Mid Suffolk and parts of North Essex.
