= Cam FM =

Student-run radio station at the University of Cambridge and Anglia Ruskin University

Coordinates: 52.2127°N 0.1034°E

CAM FM

Cambridge; England
- Broadcast area: University of Cambridge & Anglia Ruskin University
- Frequency: 97.2 MHz

Programming
- Format: Variety

Ownership
- Owner: Cambridge and Anglia Ruskin Student Radio Ltd

History
- First air date: February 1979
- Former names: Cambridge University Radio; CUR1350

Links
- Webcast: stream.camfm.co.uk/camfm www.camfm.co.uk/player
- Website: www.camfm.co.uk

Cam FM (formerly known as Cambridge University Radio and later CUR1350) is a student-run radio station at the University of Cambridge and Anglia Ruskin University. The station broadcasts online and has an FM frequency of 97.2 MHz. The station opened studios at Anglia Ruskin University and Fitzwilliam College and started broadcasting in 2012 from these locations after having spent its first 32 years located in Churchill College. Cam FM once held the world record for the longest team broadcast marathon, at 76 hours, and following the significant technical overhaul as a result of the two new studios in 2012, provided the first-ever broadcast media coverage of the Oxford vs Cambridge Women's Boat Race from Dorney Lake, as well as live outside broadcasts from Newmarket Races and the Varsity Ski Trip.

In March 2009, Cam FM was awarded an FM Community Licence by the UK Broadcasting Regulator Ofcom. The station, then known as CUR1350, took on its current name and launched its FM service on 2 October 2010. The station is a wholly owned subsidiary of Cambridge and Anglia Ruskin Student Radio Ltd, which is also the FM licence holder.

Cam FM disaffiliated from the Student Radio Association in 2015, despite once winning Best Station at the Association's Student Radio Awards 2007 as CUR1350. However, Cam FM rejoined the Student Radio Association in 2019.

Cam FM is managed by a committee of annually elected students and alumni of the University of Cambridge and Anglia Ruskin University. It is transmitted from Cambridge University Library on West Road.

== History ==
In early 1979, Simon Cooper, Ellie Buchanan, and David Clouter at the student-run Cambridge University Broadcasting Society founded a radio station which was granted permission to install induction loops around the Cambridge colleges of Churchill and later New Hall, allowing residents to listen to Cambridge University Radio (as it was then known) over a short-range, mono, mediumwave broadcast. The station subsequently became CUR945.

Despite successfully applying for a number of short-term FM licences, CUR was unable to continuously broadcast to the university community, and so it struggled to achieve widespread popularity.

The explosive growth of the Internet, along with many colleges installing high-speed Ethernet connections in student rooms, prompted the station to launch a simultaneous webcast in 1998. This allowed students from throughout the University to listen whenever they were near a computer. In 2004, the Internet audio webcasts were upgraded, and in 2005, an enhanced online player was launched.

Additionally, in 2002, the station successfully applied for a long-term, low-powered AM licence. Broadcasting on 1350 kHz, the station was then known as CUR1350.

In 2006, CUR1350 launched a project to install a cable service to multiple sites across the University of Cambridge and Anglia Ruskin. Dubbed "CURintheBAR", the station was distributed via the universities' LAN network to receiving units positioned in student bars and cafes, where it was relayed over loudspeakers.

In March 2009, the station was granted an FM Community Radio License by the UK regulator Ofcom to become the only FM radio station targeting members of Cambridge University and Anglia Ruskin University. Regular programmes began on the new frequency of 97.2 FM in October 2010; the station is now rebranded as Cam FM.

Cam FM is financially self-sufficient via on-air and online advertising and a yearly membership fee. Profits are invested back into the station to improve the service for listeners and the experience for station members. The station receives no funding from either the university or any student union.

== Current broadcasts ==
Currently, Cam FM broadcasts continuously, with an automated playout system filling the intervals between live broadcasts. During term time, much of the station's output is live between the hours of 8 am and 1 am. Programmes are produced and presented by undergraduate and postgraduate students and alumni at both the University of Cambridge and the Cambridge campus of Anglia Ruskin University. A majority of programmes are specialist music shows (e.g. drum and bass, indie rock, UK garage), though others are aimed at a wider audience (e.g. their breakfast show, theatre/film review show, or local news coverage).

Most of the technology used by Cam FM is developed in-house, such as their automated playout system, computerized playout systems and audio routing in the studio, enabling the station to be built to specification.

== Awards ==
Sports coverage earned the station a silver award in the 2003 Student Radio Awards for their annual coverage of the May Bumps. In 2004, the station won four awards:

- Val Mellon, who would be later heard on the national DAB station Core until it ceased broadcast in 2008, won a gold award for Best Entertainment Show, as well as a bronze award for Best Female Presenter.
- A further gold award was presented to the station for Technical Achievement in recognition of the station's platform-independent webcast system.
- A silver award was given to the station for Best Sports Programming for their live coverage of the annual Oxford vs Cambridge rugby union Varsity match.

In 2005, CUR1350 was nominated for four awards. These were:

- Technical Achievement - the station was nominated for its wireless internet link coverage of May Bumps 2005,
- Sports Broadcasting - Ed Bolton for The Sports Show, including interviews with Chris Eubank,
- Specialist Music - Samuel Green for "Kol Cambridge", the UK's then-only broadcast radio show dedicated to Israeli and Jewish Music - this show continues to the present day, now in the form of a podcast independent of Cam FM,
- Student Radio Station of the Year

In 2007, CUR1350 was nominated for an all-time company record of nine Student Radio Awards, making it the most nominated station of 2007:

- Best Technical Innovation
- Three for Best Entertainment Programme - Charles Lyon's "Weekend Breakfast", Jaine Sykes' "Rock Paper Scissors", and Ella Belsham & Alex-James Painter's "Morning Glory"),
- Best Specialist Music Programme - Tobias Bown's "Volume 11",
- Newcomer of the Year - Jaine Sykes,
- Two for Best Female Presenter - Katherine Godfrey and Jaine Sykes,
- Student Radio Station of the Year

Of these, CUR1350 won Bronze in the Best Entertainment Programme category with Charles Lyons' "Weekend Breakfast", Gold for Katherine Godfrey in the Best Female Presenter category, and Gold in Station of the Year.

In 2008, CUR1350 was nominated for:

- Student Radio Station of the Year,
- Best Specialist Music Programme - Sandy Mill,
- Best Outside Broadcast - The 2008 May Bumps,
- Best Student Radio Chart Show - Charles Lyon

Of these, the station won Gold in the Best Chart Show category. Best Student Radio Chart Show was also a new category as of this year.

In 2009, CUR1350 received two nominations at the Student Radio Awards. These were for:

- Best Student Radio Chart Show - Tobias Bown and Simon Ruggles
- Best Outside Broadcast/Live Event - The 2009 May Bumps.

In 2012, now known as Cam FM, the station was nominated at the Student Radio Awards for:

- Best Outside Broadcast/Live Event - the 2012 May Bumps,
- Best Speech - "The Fo' Show"
- Student Radio Station of the Year.

Of these, the station won gold in the Best Outside Broadcast/Live Event category.

The Kevin Greening Award is named in honour of the late BBC Radio One presenter whose career in radio started at CUR1350, as it was then known.

== Alumni ==
Several of the station's members have subsequently achieved considerable success in the wider world of radio & television broadcasting. Notable examples include:

- Kevin Greening, a presenter on BBC Radio 1 throughout the latter half of the 1990s, went on to present on 102.2 Smooth FM, which broadcasts across Greater London, until his untimely death aged 44 in December 2007.
- Matthew Price is now the BBC's Europe Correspondent, having previously been BBC's New York Correspondent and Middle East Correspondent.
- Spencer Kelly is the presenter of the BBC TV programme Click Online and was formerly a presenter on Ocean FM broadcasting across Portsmouth and Southampton.
- Rebecca Steers is the Station Manager of NLive Radio in Northampton, the Founder and Chair of the UK National Community Radio Awards, and the Founder and Manager of Scout Radio.

The station once held annual alumni days, on which former members were invited back to once again produce and present shows for listeners within the University.
