= Spark Sunderland =

Community radio station in Sunderland

- Sunderland; England
- Frequency: 107.0 MHz

Programming
- Language: English
- Format: Community radio

Ownership
- Owner: University of Sunderland

History
- First air date: 27 October 2009

Links
- Website: www.sparksunderland.com

Spark (formerly 107 Spark FM and Spark FM) is a community radio station serving 15- to 30-year-olds in the Sunderland area. Spark carries a variety of content catering for both mainstream and niche musical audiences, specialising in chart hits and new music throughout the day, and specialist programming after 7 p.m. The radio station broadcasts on 107.0FM and online via the station's website. The official launch of Spark took place at the new £12 million CitySpace building in the centre of the city of Sunderland.

== History ==
The station began broadcasting in November 1997 as Radio Utopia a two-week short term broadcast under the (then) Radio Authority's Restricted Service Licence (RSL) scheme. The station was part of a regional arts festival called "Visions of Utopia" and the station reflected the scheme and carried various programmes tied-in with the scheme, such as "The Quakies" a programme produced by children from the former pit village of Quaking Houses in County Durham. Radio broadcasting predated this by several years, with student programming on the community radio station Wear FM, which closed in 1995 and is now the more commercial station Sun FM. The station was low powered but still proved valuable as a training ground for new broadcasters. Programmes were broadcast from studios in the Forster Building, formerly used by Wear FM, with a transmitter on the roof.

The station was rebranded the following November as "107 Utopia FM" and developed a more formatted sound and joined the "Student Broadcast Network" (SBN) bringing news, national programmes and a 24-hour service to the station. Utopia returned in September 1999 for the first ever freshers broadcast and again proved its value for students and volunteers. The station largely draws volunteers from the University's large undergraduate media courses but has also been part of wider community radio programmes with projects in County Durham, Washington and Sunderland.

During the following years Utopia broadcast more frequently, getting up to broadcasts twice a year. In 2002, Utopia began broadcasting on the 102.4FM frequency. In 2003, the station began to use new studios in the £11m Media Centre at the St. Peter's Campus, when media teaching moved there that year. The old studios have now been demolished and the building is now used to teach courses run by the University's School of Education and Lifelong Learning. The move also facilitated the recording of sessions in The Media Centre's new radio and television studios.

The station applied for a Community Radio Licence from OFCOM in the 2nd licensing round and was awarded a licence in 2007. The station took on the new name of Spark when it launched in 2009. The name is a reflection of the University logo, which they call a 'spark' in homage to the shipyards that were central to the growth of Sunderland.

Volunteers from the station have not only succeeded in gaining recognition in the annual student radio awards in the UK but also awards from the New York Festivals. Station alumni are now found working for BBC and Commercial stations across the UK.

Volunteers at the station are known internally and across the student radio network and media network as "Sparkies".

== Community licence and rebrand ==
When the UK media regulator Ofcom announced a plan to issue Community Radio licences, work began at the station to apply for a Full Time licence. This application was made in early in 2007. In September 2007, Ofcom awarded Utopia FM a full-time 5 year Community Radio licence.

It was announced in June 2009 that Utopia FM would be changing its name to 107 Spark FM to signal the change in licence and the broadening of the audience.

In 2012, Spark was awarded 'Best North East Radio Station' in the Radio Academy's 'Nations & Regional Awards'.

In late 2013, the '107' branding was removed for the station and the station was simply known as 'Spark' or 'Spark FM'.

In 2015, the station was updated with a refreshed logo, a slogan change to 'Where Sunderland Lives', new on-air imaging provided by Reelworld and a brand new website.

As of 2016, the station is now referred to as 'Spark' only on air, dropping the 'fm' suffix.

== Programming, music and output ==
The majority of Spark's programming is broadcast live from its studio at the David Puttnam Media Centre at St.Peters Campus of University of Sunderland. Spark broadcasts at least eight hours of original programming each weekday, while overnights are non-stop music. Daytime shows feature a mix of playlist music, interviews, discussions and news reporting.

Spark play a mix of hit music and emerging music. Genres range from Chart Hits, Indie/Alternative, Dance, Urban/R&B. During the evening, 7pm-11pm Spark have a number of specialist music shows, such as 'The Takedown', focusing on different genres.

The station airs hourly national IRN news updates during daytime hours.

== Awards ==
Year	Awards	Category	Result
2010	Radio Academy North East	Best Station	Gold
2010	The Charles Parker Prize	Best Student Audio Feature	Silver
2011	Radio Academy North East	Best Station	Gold
2011	The Charles Parker Prize	Best Student Audio Feature	Bronze
2011	I Love Student Radio Awards	Volunteer of the Year	Gold
2011	I Love Student Radio Awards	Station Manager of the Year	Gold
2011	I Love Student Radio Awards	Community Spirit	Gold
2011	Student Radio Awards	Best Marketing & Station Sound	Nominated
2011	Student Radio Awards	Best Newcomer	Nominated
2011	Student Radio Awards	Best Female	Nominated
2011	Student Radio Awards	Best Speech	Gold
2011	Student Radio Awards	Best Specialist	Bronze
2011	Student Radio Awards	Best Interview	Silver
2012	Radio Academy North East	Best Station	Gold
2012	New York Festivals Radio Awards	Best Station	Silver
2012	I Love Student Radio Awards	Volunteer of the Year	Gold
2012	I Love Student Radio Awards	Charity Champion	Gold
2012	Student Radio Awards	Best Student Radio Station	Bronze
2012	Student Radio Awards	Best Male	Gold
2012	Student Radio Awards	Best Newcomer	Nominated
2012	Student Radio Awards	Best Marketing & Station Sound	Bronze
2012	Student Radio Awards	Best Entertainment Programming	Gold
2012	Student Radio Awards	Best Entertainment Programming	Nominated
2012	Student Radio Awards	Best Specialist Music Programming	Gold
2012	Student Radio Awards	Best Interview	Gold
2012	Student Radio Awards	Best Interview	Gold
2012	Student Radio Awards	Best Interview	Silver
2012	Student Radio Awards	Best Interview	Nominated
2012	Student Radio Awards	Best Live Event or Outside Broadcast	Nominated
2013	I Love Student Radio Awards	Community Spirit	Gold
2013	Student Radio Awards	Best Speech Programming	Nominated
2013	Student Radio Awards	Best Newcomer	Bronze
2013	Student Radio Awards	Best Female	Silver
2013	Student Radio Awards	Best Male	Bronze
2014	The Charles Parker Prize	Best Student Audio Feature	Bronze
2014	The Charles Parker Prize	Best Student Audio Feature	Silver
2014	I Love Student Radio Awards	Volunteer of the Year	Highly Commended
2014	I Love Student Radio Awards	Volunteer of the Year	Highly Commended
2014	I Love Student Radio Awards	Volunteer of the Year	Gold
2014	Student Radio Awards	Best Male	Nominated
2014	Student Radio Awards	Best Female	Nominated
2014	Student Radio Awards	Best Speech	Nominated
2014	Student Radio Awards	Best Student Radio Station	Bronze
2015	The Charles Parker Prize	Best Student Audio Feature	Silver
2015	New York Festivals Radio Awards	Best Student Drama Programme	Gold
2015	New York Festivals Radio Awards	Best Student Radio Station	Bronze
2015	I Love Student Radio Awards	Volunteer of the Year	Gold
2015	I Love Student Radio Awards	Volunteer of the Year	Highly Commended
2015	Student Radio Awards	Best Female	Nominated
2015	Student Radio Awards	Best Female	Nominated
2015	Student Radio Awards	Best Speech Programming	Nominated
2015	Student Radio Awards	Best Speech Programming	Nominated
2015	Student Radio Awards	Best Speech Programming	Bronze
2015	Student Radio Awards	Best Speech Programming	Gold
2015	Student Radio Awards	Best Multiplatform Initiative	Bronze
2015	Student Radio Awards	Best Student Radio Station	Bronze
2016	The Charles Parker Prize	Best Student Audio Feature	Bronze
2016	New York Festivals Radio Awards	Best Student Documentary	Nominated
2016	New York Festivals Radio Awards	Best Student Station	Gold
2016	I Love Student Radio Awards	Volunteer of the Year	Gold
2016	I Love Student Radio Awards	Best Training Initiative	Highly Commended
2016	Community Radio Awards	Innovation Award of the Year	Silver
2016	Community Radio Awards	Young Person of the Year	Nominated
2016	Community Radio Awards	Sports Show of the Year	Silver
2016	Community Radio Awards	Specialist Music Show of the Year	Silver
2016	Community Radio Awards	Arts & Creative Radio of the Year	Gold
2016	Community Radio Awards	Speech & Journalism of the Year	Bronze
2016	Community Radio Awards	Speech & Journalism of the Year	Nominated
2016	Community Radio Awards	Entertainment Show of the Year	Nominated
2016	Community Radio Awards	Entertainment Show of the Year	Silver
2016	Community Radio Awards	Male Presenter of the Year	Bronze
2016	Student Radio Awards	Best Speech Programming	Silver
2017	New York Festivals Radio Awards	Best Student Station	Nominated
2017	I Love Student Radio Awards	Hero of the Moment	Silver
2017	I Love Student Radio Awards	Student Radio Team of the Year	Silver
2017	Community Radio Awards	Speech and Journalism Radio of the Year	Nominated
2017	Community Radio Awards	Community Development Project of the Year	Nominated
2017	Community Radio Awards	Community Development Project of the Year	Gold
2017	Community Radio Awards	Innovation Award	Gold
2017	Community Radio Awards	Sports Show of the Year	Gold
2017	Community Radio Awards	Specialist Music Show of the Year	Silver
2017	Community Radio Awards	Entertainment Show of the Year	Bronze
2017	Community Radio Awards	Entertainment Show of the Year	Silver
2017	Student Radio Awards	Best Male Presenter	Silver
2017	Student Radio Awards	Best Female Presenter	Nominated
2017	Student Radio Awards	Best Speech Programming	Gold
2018	The Charles Parker Prize	Best Student Audio Feature	Silver
2018	New York Festivals Radio Awards	Best Student Documentary	Gold
2018	I Love Student Radio Awards	Hero of the Moment	Nominated
2018	I Love Student Radio Awards	Hero of the Moment	Nominated
2018	I Love Student Radio Awards	Team of the Year	Nominated
2018	I Love Student Radio Awards	Best Audience Initiative	Nominated
2018	I Love Student Radio Awards	Best Training Initiative	Nominated
2018	I Love Student Radio Awards	Outstanding Contribution	Nominated
2018	I Love Student Radio Awards	Outstanding Contribution	Nominated
2018	I Love Student Radio Awards	Committee Member of the Year	Highly Commended
2018	I Love Student Radio Awards	Region of the Year	Highly Commended
2018	I Love Student Radio Awards	Best Outreach Project	Highly Commended
2018	Community Radio Awards	Sports Show of the Year	Nominated
2018	Community Radio Awards	Specialist Music Show of the Year	Gold
2018	Community Radio Awards	Arts & Creative Radio of the Year	Nominated
2018	Community Radio Awards	Entertainment Show of the Year	Bronze
2018	Community Radio Awards	Community Show of the Year	Nominated
2018	Community Radio Awards	Station of the Year	Silver
2018	Student Radio Awards	Best Male	Nominated
2018	Student Radio Awards	Best Entertainment Programme	Nominated
2018	Student Radio Awards	Best Specialist Music Programming	Silver
2018	Student Radio Awards	Best Journalistic Programming	Nominated
2018	Student Radio Awards	Best Speech Programming	Gold
2018	Student Radio Awards	Best Interview	Nominated
2018	Student Radio Awards	Best Interview	Gold
2019	The Charles Parker Prize	Best Student Audio Feature	Nominated
2019	The Charles Parker Prize	Best Student Audio Feature	Nominated
2019	New York Festivals Radio Awards	Best Student Drama Program	Nominated
2019	I Love Student Radio Awards	Region of the Year	Gold
2019	I Love Student Radio Awards	Best Outreach Project	Highly Commended
2019	Community Radio Awards	Specialist Music Show of the Year	Nominated
2019	Community Radio Awards	Arts & Creative Radio of the Year	Silver
2019	Community Radio Awards	Arts & Creative Radio of the Year	Nominated
2019	Community Radio Awards	Station of the Year	Bronze
2019	Community Radio Awards	Community Development Project of the Year	Silver
2019	Student Radio Awards	Best Student Radio Station	Nominated
2019	Student Radio Awards	Best Male	Bronze
2019	Student Radio Awards	Best Male	Silver
2019	Student Radio Awards	Best Speech Programming	Bronze
2019	Student Radio Awards	Best Speech Programming	Nominated
2020	The Charles Parker Prize	Best Student Audio Feature	Nominated
2020	The Charles Parker Prize	Best Student Audio Feature	Prizewinner
2020	New York Festivals Radio Awards	Best Student Documentary	Bronze
2020	I Love Student Radio Awards	Most Committed Committee Member	Nominated
2020	I Love Student Radio Awards	Outstanding Contribution	Highly Commended
2020	I Love Student Radio Awards	Moment of the Year	Nominated
2020	I Love Student Radio Awards	Spirit of Student Radio	Gold
2020	I Love Student Radio Awards	Hero of the Moment	Nominated
2020	Community Radio Awards	Podcast of the Year	Bronze
2020	Community Radio Awards	Speech & Journalism of the Year	Bronze
2020	Community Radio Awards	Entertainment Show of the Year	Nominated
2020	Student Radio Awards	Best Event or Outside Broadcast	Bronze
2020	Student Radio Awards	Best Podcast	Silver
2020	Student Radio Awards	Best Interview	Silver
2020	Student Radio Awards	Best Producer	Nominated
2020	Student Radio Awards	Best Journalistic Programming	Nominated
2020	Student Radio Awards	Best Speech Show/Presenter	Nominated
2020	Student Radio Awards	Best Music Show/Presenter	Gold
2020	Student Radio Awards	Best Entertainment Show/Presenter	Bronze
2021	The Charles Parker Prize	Best Student Audio Feature	Nominated
2021	The Charles Parker Prize	Best Student Audio Feature	Prizewinner
2021	The Charles Parker Prize	Best Student Audio Feature	Prizewinner
2021	Amplify Awards	Team of the Year	Silver
2021	Community Radio Awards	Specialist Music Show of the Year	Gold
2021	Community Radio Awards	Speech & Journalism of the Year	Gold
2021	Student Radio Awards	Best Student Radio Station	Nominated
2021	Student Radio Awards	Best Presenter	Nominated
2021	Student Radio Awards	Best Newcomer	Gold
2021	Student Radio Awards	Best Producer	Nominated
2021	Student Radio Awards	Best Producer	Nominated
2021	Student Radio Awards	Best Station Branding	Nominated
2021	Student Radio Awards	Best Speech Programming	Nominated
2021	Student Radio Awards	Best Specialist Music Programming	Nominated
2021	Student Radio Awards	Best Entertainment Programming	Nominated
2022	The Charles Parker Prize	Best Student Audio Feature	Nominated
2022	The Charles Parker Prize	Best Student Audio Feature	Prizewinner
2022	New York Festivals Radio Awards	Best Student Documentary	Nominated
2022	New York Festivals Radio Awards	Best Student Drama Program	Bronze
2022	Amplify Awards	Best Student Media Collaboration	Gold
2022	Amplify Awards	The Student Radio Amplify Award	Silver
2022	Amplify Awards	Best Contribution to the Region	Silver
2022	Amplify Awards	Outstanding Contribution	Bronze
2022	Amplify Awards	Student Radio Moment of the Year	Nominated
2022	Amplify Awards	Most Improved Station	Nominated
2022	Amplify Awards	Team of the Year	Nominated
2022	Amplify Awards	Hero of the Moment	Nominated
2022	Amplify Awards	Hero of the Moment	Nominated
2022	Amplify Awards	Hero of the Moment	Gold
2022	Amplify Awards	Best Training Initiative	Silver
2022	Amplify Awards	Best Promotional Initiative	Nominated
2022	Amplify Awards	Best Outreach Project	Nominated
2022	Amplify Awards	Best Outreach Project	Nominated
2022	Amplify Awards	The Coronavirus Resilience Award	Bronze
2022	Community Radio Awards	Young Person of the Year (under 25)	Gold
2022	Community Radio Awards	Arts & Creative Radio of the Year	Silver
2022	Community Radio Awards	Arts & Creative Radio of the Year	Gold
2022	Community Radio Awards	Station of the Year	Nominated
2022	Student Radio Awards	Best Specialist Music Programming	Bronze
2022	Student Radio Awards	Best Entertainment Programming	Nominated
2022	Student Radio Awards	Best Event Programming	Silver
2022	Student Radio Awards	Best Radio Station	Gold
2022	Student Radio Awards	Best Journalistic Programming	Nominated
2022	Student Radio Awards	The Diversity, Equality & Inclusivity Award	Nominated
2022	Student Radio Awards	The Diversity, Equality & Inclusivity Award	Bronze
2022	Student Radio Awards	Best Speech Programming	Silver
2022	Student Radio Awards	Best Speech Programming	Nominated
2022	Student Radio Awards	Best Podcast Programming	Nominated
2022	Student Radio Awards	Best Producer	Nominated
2022	Student Radio Awards	Best Presenter	Nominated
2022	Student Radio Awards	Best Presenter	Bronze
2022	Student Radio Awards	Best Presenter	Gold
2022	Student Radio Awards	Best Newcomer	Silver
2022	Student Radio Awards	Best Newcomer	Gold
2023	New York Festivals Radio Awards	Best Student Documentary	Silver
2023	New York Festivals Radio Awards	Best Student Documentary	Nominated
2023	Amplify Awards	Hero of the Moment	Gold
2023	Amplify Awards	Best Training Initiative	Nominated
2023	Amplify Awards	Best Promotional Initiative	Bronze
2023	Amplify Awards	Most Committed Committee Member	Nominated
2023	Amplify Awards	Team of the Year	Nominated
2023	Amplify Awards	Team of the Year	Nominated
2023	Amplify Awards	The Amplify Award	Bronze
2023	The Charles Parker Prize	Best Student Audio Feature	Prizewinner
2023	The Charles Parker Prize	Best Student Audio Feature	Prizewinner

== Notable alumni ==
A number of Spark volunteers have graduated from the University of Sunderland and gone on to work for local, regional or national radio stations as well as TV stations and print media.

- Jordan North (2009–2011): Capital Breakfast on Capital (via Capital Manchester, Rock FM & BBC Radio 1)
