= Huntingdon Community Radio =

Cambridgeshire, England community radio station

Coordinates: 52.329098°N 0.180999°W

- Huntingdon; England
- Broadcast area: Huntingdonshire
- Frequency: 104.0 MHz
- RDS: HCR 104FM
- Branding: The Sound of Huntingdonshire

Programming
- Format: Community radio
- Affiliations: The Hunts Post (local newspaper)

Ownership
- Owner: HCRFM Huntingdon Community Radio (Media) Limited

History
- First air date: 23 April 2011

Links
- Website: www.ousevalleyradio.com

Huntingdon Community Radio is a community radio station operating from studios in Huntingdonshire, Cambridgeshire, England. It was awarded a broadcast licence by Ofcom in 2009, and has been broadcasting on 104 FM across Huntingdonshire and online since April 2011.

== History ==
HCR started life in 1995 when a group of volunteers opened a temporary studio above Bookmakers Braybrook Racing in Huntingdon. Obtaining a Restricted Service Licence, HCR initially went on air for three weeks. Following the initial broadcast, a partnership was established with the community college in St Neots, Cambridgeshire. The purpose of the partnership was to allow sixth form students to practice and develop an interest in broadcast media. This partnership, along with purpose-built studios, remained extant for several years before the station moved to new studios at RAF Wyton.

The volunteer committee lobbied Ofcom for the allocation of a full-time community licence for Huntingdon. Following a successful bid, HCR was awarded a full-time licence in 2009.

Following the award of the licence, the station became known as HCR104fm, using the previous name as a byline. It went on air permanently in May 2011.

The station has national news each hour from SKY and local news in association with The Hunts Post each day. The station is funded through a mix of grants, advertising and sponsorship.

== Programming ==
Programming on the station runs 24 hours a day. Each weekday evening at 7pm, the station airs a community-based interview show, Over to You.

A radio soap opera, Huntsford, aired on the station in 2010 before being relaunched in 2017.
