= Downley =

Village in Buckinghamshire, England

Coordinates: 51.649°N 0.776°W

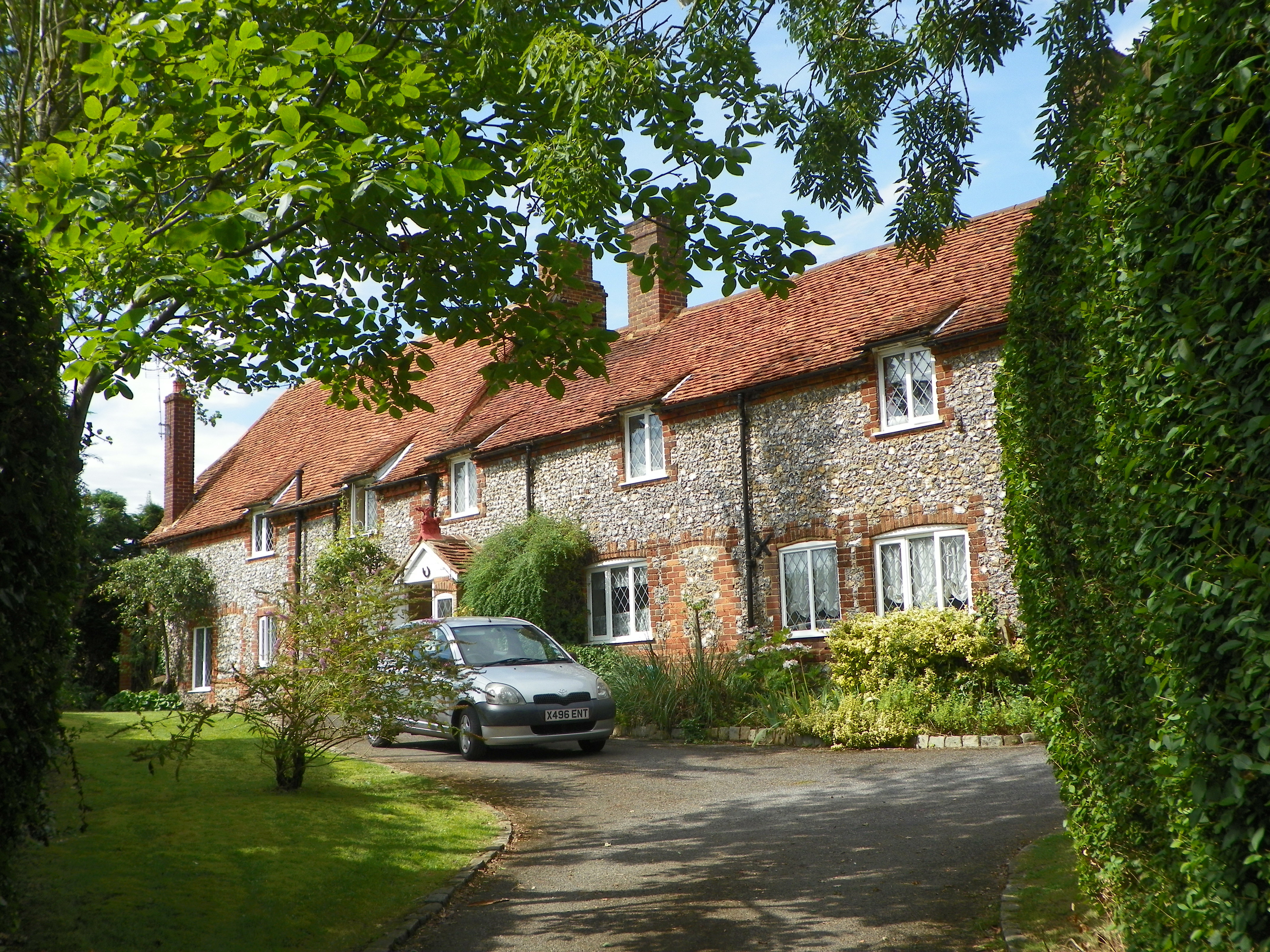
- Blacksmiths Cottage, Downley, 2012

- Location within Buckinghamshire
- Population: 2,244; 5,278 (2011 Census)
- OS grid reference: SU845955
- Unitary authority: Buckinghamshire
- Ceremonial county: Buckinghamshire
- Region: South East
- Country: England
- Sovereign state: United Kingdom
- Post town: High Wycombe
- Postcode district: HP13
- Dialling code: 01494
- Police: Thames Valley
- Fire: Buckinghamshire
- Ambulance: South Central
- UK Parliament: Wycombe
- Website: Downley Parish Council

Downley is a village and civil parish in Buckinghamshire, England, which was included in Wycombe district before its abolition. It is high in the Chiltern Hills, overlooking the town of High Wycombe, although today it is almost indistinguishable from the urban spread of the latter town.

The central part of the parish is the common, this extends over about 56 acres (23 ha). It is part of the Chilterns Area of Outstanding Natural Beauty. Downley was originally within the 1890s civil parish of West Wycombe, however, in the 1930s West Wycombe village was incorporated into the Borough of High Wycombe and the remainder of the original civil West Wycombe Parish, which included Downley, became known as West Wycombe Rural Detached Parish. Due to Local Government reorganisation in the 1980s West Wycombe Rural Detached Parish was split into two civil Parishes, one of which was Downley Parish, the other being Piddington & Wheeler End. Downley was once three hamlets, Downley was the largest, with Littleworth and Plummer's Green on its south side. Both of these have now been incorporated into Downley as a whole, but there are still names such as Littleworth Road and Plomer Hill. Plomer is a derivative from Plummer.

Downley was extensively built up in the 1950s-1960s and is still changing now, with the parish boundary being extended.

The Memorial Hall, also known as the Village Hall, in the High Street was built in 1923 and is still in use. The old School, built in the 1870s is also still in use. There were also furniture making factories in the village as well as home workshops; a practice which was common in the Chilterns as High Wycombe and surrounding towns were large producers of furniture, in particular chairs from the Industrial Revolution onwards.

Downley was once home to several farms, the largest of these stopped working in the 1990s but can be plainly seen from commonside with its huge barns and unusual listed farm house.

== Toponym ==
The toponym "Downley" is derived from the Old English words dun ("wood") or down ("hill") and lea ("clearing"). This indicates that the Anglo-Saxons found this area of the Chilterns to be wooded and that Downley was a clearing.

== The Common ==
One of the few Chiltern commons that has remained open in the area, rather than become wooded. The common was once part of an Anglo-Saxon tithing, or group of ten dwellings.

Something else that makes this common unusual is the way it has been changed by its industrial past. The biggest change in its landscape is the excavation of clay, chalk and flint from all over the common, this has left behind pits, called dells, some very large and deep. The reason the clay was extracted is slightly vague but is most likely for making bricks and tiles. The smaller pits that are round, usually made on a boundary ditch are saw pits. These are identifiable as the spoil heap is on the downward slope.

Also noticeable, mainly in the woods are ancient parish boundaries. These once separated the land between Hughenden and West Wycombe parishes.

During World War II the Army used the common to test and repair Churchill tanks. The tracks are still visible, but are hard to make out, on the common today. Downley Common was used as a golf course for a short while, hence the name of Golf Link Cottages and the Bricklayers Arms once being called the Golf Links.

At the top of the common next to the cricket pavilion there is a small but distinct Blacksmiths Forge. This was still in use up until the early 1990s. Downley is also home to the rare starfruit flower which has been known to grow on Mannings Pond.

The welfare of the common is maintained by the Downley Common Preservation Society.

Downley Common also plays host to a number of sports clubs, mainly Downley Cricket Club and Downley Albion Football Club.

== History ==
The oldest house in the village, Blacksmiths Cottage is situated on the top end of the common, dates from the 12th or 13th century. The oldest pub in Downley is The Le De (not Lady) Spencers Arms at the very top of the common. It's known to the locals as the Lee Dee, The Shed or the Top Pub. The building dates from the 17th century and was once a bakery. It is believed to have been a watering hole for drovers who passed through from Wales on their way to London.

West Wycombe estate still leaves its mark on Downley life, there is a large, regular shoot, mostly held on Saturdays during hunting season. This is managed by Cookshall Farm, which is in the parish at the very top end.

== Folklore and events ==
Downley has a few interesting road names, such as "Bug Alley" which is now Moor Lane, Coffin Lane which is at the end of Moor Lane and leads to Hughenden Church. Kiln Pond Lane, where apparently a horse and cart reputedly ran into the Kiln Pond.

Downley traditions include the Guy Fawkes Night torch parade, where literally hundreds of people march up the common with tin can torches and throw then into the bonfire. Also there are two Village fetes, one being Downley day and the other being the Jolities which is the older. Downley also claims a strong sporting heritage. With well established cricket and football teams who use the cricket pitch and newly gained space next to Mannings field.

== Schools ==
The Downley School (or TDS) is a combined school in Downley with 'Inadequate' (Ofsted), which teaches pupils from ages 4–11 (Years 1–6 in the British educational system).

== Football Club ==
Downley has several local football teams ranging from junior side Downley Dynamos all the way up to the oldest club in the village, Downley Albion Football Club formed in 1885. Both the Dynamos and Albion play home games at Downley Common and share the sports pavilion which is also used by the local cricket team.
