= Restricted service licence =

British limited time low power radio or television broadcasting permit

A restricted service licence (often called an RSL) is a type of broadcast licence typically granted to radio stations and television stations broadcasting within the United Kingdom to serve a local community or a special event. Licences are granted by the broadcasting authority Ofcom (formerly the Radio Authority and the Independent Television Commission, respectively). The first licenses were granted by the Home Office.

== History ==
In 1972, the Independent Broadcasting Authority was created and given responsibility for regulating independent television and radio services in the UK.

Over time, the demand for local services increased, and finally prompted an act of Parliament, the Broadcasting Act 1990, to deregulate the respective industries and facilitate new long-term and short-term broadcast licences. The act led to the establishment of two licensing authorities: the Radio Authority to license new radio services and monitor existing licences, and the Independent Television Commission, to license new short-term television services.

While the Broadcasting Act 1990 proved successful, licensing procedures remained restrictive compared to those in other countries.

In 2004, the Radio Authority and ITC were folded into the Office of Communications (Ofcom). Today Ofcom handles all licensing for frequencies used by television and radio services.

Until May 2015 short-range broadcasts and wireless links, and other programme makers frequencies were licensed by JFMG (Joint Frequency Management Group), owned by Arqiva. In May 2015 Ofcom made the decision to end the contract with Arqiva and to in-source the existing services.

== Radio ==
Short-term RSLs are typically broadcast on low-power FM (1 W–25 W) or AM (1 W) and can generally last a maximum of 28 consecutive days and can only be applied for twice in twelve months with four complete months separating the two broadcast periods (and only once in twelve months inside Greater London) by the same applicant/group.

They are generally used for special events, sporting events, religious festivals, student radio, hospital radio or to trial a radio project in preparation for an application for a permanent licence. Long-term RSLs (typically broadcast on low-power AM, but more recently in remote areas on low-power FM as well) are used for radio stations broadcasting to closed areas of private land such as university campuses and hospitals. They can be compared with the low-power broadcasting movement in the United States. Channel Travel Radio broadcast a travel news service using a Long-term RSL licence along part of the M20 motorway in East Kent. The service operated on 107.6MHz from 1995 to 2000.

A number of stations that ran RSL broadcasts in the 1990s and early 2000s subsequently went on to run full-time radio stations. The first FM RSL licence was issued on 5th July 1988 to Radio Thamesmead (south-east London) for the Thamesmead Town show on the weekend of 23–24 July 1988. The licence fee was £700 for the transmission on 104.3MHz at 1W ERP. The station later obtained a full-time licence operating as RTM Radio.

=== Radio stations broadcasting under a restricted service licence ===
Some example stations broadcast with RSLs (with more than a single appearance)

- Worthy FM (Glastonbury Festival)
- 103 The Eye, previously TWCFM, awarded the first full-time community radio licence in UK 1 November 2005 for Melton Mowbray by Ofcom
- Radio Caroline, former offshore "pirate" radio station now available on medium wave, DAB, satellite and Internet radio
- Phoenix FM, community radio station in Brentwood which broadcast 12 RSLs before being awarded a full-time licence by Ofcom
- Don FM, London pirate radio station
- Blink FM, a youth radio station operating at selected times annually in south Buckinghamshire
- Takeover Radio, children's radio service in Leicester
- XFM (London)
- KMFM Maidstone, previously CTR 105.6 and 20/20FM
- Huntingdon Community Radio (Huntingdon), now awarded a full-time licence by Ofcom and known as HCRfm
- Waves FM, previously Waves AM. Broadcasting from Peterhead, in the North East of Scotland
- GLOSS FM, previously Thornbury FM. Broadcasts to South Gloucestershire, England.
- Moorlands Radio, broadcasts now on 103.7 FM to the Staffordshire Moorlands
- BigglesFM (Biggleswade), now awarded a full-time licence by Ofcom
- Chaine FM, Christmas radio station, broadcasting each December in Larne, Northern Ireland

== Television ==
RSLs were also issued to television stations and other organisations which wished to cover a very small area. These licences (also known as restricted television service licences or RTS licences) restrict power, and hence range, but not operating hours. These licences are valid for four years, and must be competed for on renewal.

The first local TV station to go on the air in the UK with an analogue RSL licence was TV12 on the Isle of Wight. It commenced broadcasting in October 1998 from the main ITV/BBC transmitter at Rowridge. TV12's studios were initially at the Medina Centre in Newport – later moving to retail premises in the town centre and finally a factory unit on the outskirts of the town. Initially a staff of more than 25 made hundreds of hours of local programmes – most of which were filmed on location in and around the island.

Later local TV licences were awarded for stations in Belfast, Bristol, Cardiff, Carlisle, Coleraine, Derry, Dundee, Edinburgh, Fawley, Glasgow, Hertford, Lanarkshire, Leicester, Limavady, Manchester, Northampton, Norwich, Oxford, Portsmouth, Reading, Southampton, Swansea, Taunton, Teesside, Ware, Wellington, and York.

In light of the national switch-over from analogue to digital TV the television regulator, Ofcom, extended several analogue Local TV licences until local digital switchover became due in each respective area. This process was complete in October 2012. Meanwhile, in February 2009 bids were invited for auctions for the first local digital multiplex licences to be offered in the UK – the first two of which were awarded shortly thereafter. However the awarding of additional licences was halted in favour of a network of local broadcasters.

=== Channels licensed under RTSs ===
- C9TV – Coleraine, Derry, Limavady – ceased broadcasting in 2008
- MATV – Leicester – ceased broadcasting on analogue terrestrial television in 2009
- NvTv – Belfast – ceased broadcasting on 23 October 2012, granted a local digital TV licence
- Six TV Oxford – Oxford – ceased broadcasting in April 2009
- Six TV Portsmouth – Portsmouth – never launched
- Six TV Reading – Reading – never launched
- Six TV Southampton – Fawley, Southampton – ceased broadcasting in April 2009
- TV Norwich – Norwich

Note that not all of these services may currently be broadcasting. Some of these stations also broadcast on other platforms such as cable and satellite.

==== Former channels licensed under RTSs ====
- TV Local Bristol – Bristol – ceased broadcasting in 2002
- Capital TV – Cardiff – ceased broadcasting in 2009
- Carlisle TV – Carlisle – trialled but never launched
- Channel M – Manchester – ceased broadcasting on analogue terrestrial television on 2 December 2009, granted a local digital multiplex licence
- Channel Six Dundee – Dundee – ceased broadcasting in 2002
- Edinburgh Television – Edinburgh – ceased broadcasting in 2003
- Herts TV – Hertford and Ware – ceased broadcasting in 2002
- Lanarkshire TV – Lanarkshire – ceased broadcasting in 2001
- Northants TV – Northampton – ceased broadcasting in 2004
- Portsmouth TV – Portsmouth – ceased broadcasting on 19 March 2004
- Solent TV – Isle of Wight – ceased broadcasting on 24 May 2007
- Southampton TV – Southampton – ceased broadcasting on 19 March 2004
- Taunton TV – Taunton and Wellington – ceased broadcasting in 2002
- Teesside – Teesside – never launched
- Thistle TV – Lanarkshire – ceased broadcasting on 17 May 2005
- TV12 – Isle of Wight – ceased broadcasting in 2002

== Disqualifications ==
The following are automatically disqualified from holding a restricted service licence:

- county, district or borough councils
- The Welsh Parliament
- The BBC
- advertising agencies
- anyone with a conviction for pirate broadcasting is barred from applying for five years (however, a number of pirate stations have successfully applied for Restricted Service Licences)
- Anyone with an unspent conviction is barred from applying for ten years from date of conviction (Murder and life sentences are never spent, as are prison sentences over four years)
- undischarged bankrupts
- political parties, trade unions, lobby groups and certain religious organisations
- anyone barred from being a company director

== See also ==
- Low-power broadcasting – the United States version of legal British stations broadcasting with a Restricted Service Licence
- Community television in Australia – a similar Australian television concept
- Community channel – a Canadian equivalent to British RSL and American LPTV stations
