= List of DAB multiplexes in the United Kingdom =

This is a list of DAB multiplexes in the United Kingdom, the Isle of Man and the Channel Islands.

== National multiplexes ==
Name	Operator	Channel	On-air date
BBC National DAB	BBC	12B	27 September 1995
Digital One	Arqiva	11D (England, Wales, Northern Ireland); 12A (Scotland)	15 November 1999
Sound Digital	Arqiva, Bauer, News Broadcasting	11A	29 February 2016

== Regional multiplexes ==
Licence area	Operator	Channel	Licence award date	On-air date
Central Scotland	Switchdigital	11D	6 October 2000	5 July 2001

=== Former ===
Licence area	Operator	Channel	Licence award date	On-air date	Closure date
North East England	MXR	12C	15 December 2000	30 July 2001	29 July 2013
South Wales and the Severn Estuary	MXR	12C	23 January 2001	30 July 2001	29 July 2013
West Midlands	MXR	12A	9 February 2001	28 August 2001	27 August 2013
North West England	MXR	12C	9 March 2001	25 September 2001	24 September 2013
Yorkshire	MXR	12A	28 November 2002	30 June 2003	29 June 2015

== Local multiplexes ==
Broadcast area	Operator	Channel	Licence award date	On-air date
Aberdeen	Switchdigital	11C	6 April 2001	3 December 2001
Ayr	Now Digital	11B		26 April 2002
Berkshire and North Hampshire	Now Digital	12D		31 July 2004
Birmingham	CE Digital	11C	6 May 1999	31 May 2000
Bournemouth	Now Digital	11B		1 August 2002
Bradford and Huddersfield	Bauer	11B		30 November 2002
Bristol	Now Digital	11B	June 2000	31 January 2001
Cambridge	Now Digital	11C		30 September 2004
Ceredigion	MuxCo	9C		February 2025
Channel Islands	Tindle Radio	12A		1 August 2021
Cornwall	Now Digital	11B		1 November 2004
Coventry	Now Digital	12D		31 January 2001
Derbyshire	Now Digital	10B		23 July 2014
Edinburgh	Bauer	12D	10 March 2000	31 October 2000
Essex	Now Digital	12D		20 May 2002
Exeter and Torbay	Now Digital	10C (Note: 11C until February 2012)		31 October 2002
Glasgow	Bauer	11C	3 September 1999	31 May 2000
Gloucestershire	MuxCo	10C		18 October 2013
Herefordshire and Worcestershire	MuxCo	12A		6 December 2013
Hertfordshire, Bedfordshire and Buckinghamshire	Now Digital	10D		14 February 2013
Humberside	Bauer	10D (Note: 11B until 1 September 2016)		30 November 2001
Inverness	Bauer	11B	15 December 2001	22 August 2003
Isle of Man (Note: Operating on a trial basis for a three-year period)	Manx Radio	11C		2 May 2023
Kent	Now Digital	11C		30 April 2004
Lancashire	Bauer	12A		1 September 2001
Leeds	Bauer	12D		31 May 2001
Leicestershire	Now Digital	11B	February 2002	30 November 2002
Lincolnshire and Humberside	MuxCo	12A		1 October 2015
Liverpool	Bauer	10C (Note: 11B until April 2016)		21 February 2001
London 1	CE Digital	12C	2 September 1999	31 May 2000
London 2	Switchdigital	12A	7 April 2000	26 June 2000
London 3	DRG London	11B		25 February 2002
Manchester	CE Digital	12C (Note: 11C until May 2016)	3 June 1999	31 May 2000
Mid and West Wales	MuxCo	12D		30 August 2013
Morecambe Bay	MuxCo	11B	18 December 2019	1 December 2021
Norfolk	Now Digital	10B (Note: 11B until 9 September 2015)		31 March 2003
North Cumbria	Bauer	11B	18 December 2019	1 December 2021
North Wales	MuxCo	10D (North West Wales); 12D (Colwyn Bay)		12 December 2014
North Yorkshire	MuxCo	10C		17 December 2014
Northamptonshire	Now Digital	10C		28 March 2013
Northern Ireland	Bauer	12D		24 September 2001
Nottinghamshire	Now Digital	12C		30 April 2004
Oxfordshire	Now Digital	10B		21 December 2012
Peterborough	Now Digital	12D		30 November 2002
Plymouth	Now Digital	12D (Note: 12A until November 2015)		1 November 2004
Sheffield	Bauer	11C	6 September 1999	26 October 2000
Somerset	MuxCo	10B		26 September 2014
South East Wales	Now Digital	12C (Note: 11C until 30 July 2013)		31 October 2000
South Hampshire	Now Digital	11C		17 February 2003
Stoke and Stafford	Bauer	12D		30 April 2004
Suffolk	MuxCo	10C	10 August 2015	7 October 2016
Surrey and North Sussex	MuxCo	10C		12 December 2013
Sussex	Now Digital	10B (Note: 11B until December 2015)		30 January 2004
Swansea	Bauer	12A		31 January 2004
Swindon	Now Digital	11C		6 February 2003
Tayside	Bauer	11B	6 September 2001	9 October 2002
Teesside	Bauer	11B		29 June 2001
Tyne and Wear	Bauer	11C		15 November 2000
West Wiltshire	Now Digital	10D (Note: 12D until October 2015)		6 February 2003
Wolverhampton, Shrewsbury and Telford	Now Digital	11B	December 1999	31 January 2001
Wrexham, Chester and Liverpool	MuxCo	10D		19 April 2013

== Small-scale DAB multiplexes ==
Permanent small-scale multiplexes licensed by Ofcom:

Licence area	Multiplex operator	Channel	Licence award date	On-air date	Stations
Aberdeen	Station House Media Unit	9C		15 January 2024	DAB+: shmuFM; Mearns FM; North East Radio Scotland
Alnwick and Morpeth	Northumberland Community Digital CIC	8B	September 2023	18 February 2025	
Ashford and Dungeness	Ashford DAB Limited	9C	June 2024	1 January 2026	
Barrow-in-Furness	Furness Broadcast Media CIC	9C	March 2025	26 September 2026	
Basingstoke	Basingstoke DAB Ltd	8B		30 November 2022 (Note: Off-air between November 2023 and December 2024 due to the collapse of the original operator, UK DAB Networks)	DAB+: Basingstoke Community Radio; Hospital Radio Basingstoke; Outreach Dance; Outreach Radio
Bath and Midsomer Norton	Bath Digital Radio CIC	8A	June 2023	28 November 2024	
Bedford	In2DAB Ltd	9C		10 February 2024	DAB: Bedford Radio; In2beats; DAB+: Angel Radio; Black Cat Radio; Diverse FM; Harpur Radio
Belfast & Lisburn	Lagan SSDAB Ltd	9A		23 January 2024	DAB+: Belfast 89FM; DanceLand; DanceLand Anthems; Eirewave; Like COUNTRY; Like ONE; Like POP; Like RETRO; Energy 106; Radio Lisburn Live
Blackburn, Burnley and Darwen	BBD Digital Ltd	8A		24 October 2023	DAB+: Central Radio NW; Drystone Radio; Red Rose Radio; Radio Sangam; Spice Digital; Sunrise Radio Gold; Sunrise Radio
Blackpool	Fun Coast Digital CIC	8B		23 August 2022	DAB+: 45 Radio; Blackpool Community Radio; Central Radio NW; Coastal Radio; Dune Radio; Fylde Coast Radio; GlitterBeam Radio; Happy Radio UK; House Party Radio; Juice Radio; Red Rose Radio
Bolton & Bury	Bolton Bury DAB Radio Ltd	10B		23 October 2023	DAB+: Atlantic 252; 96.5 Bolton FM; Cosoro Radio; Gaydio; Happy Radio UK; Panacea Radio; Roch Valley Radio
Boston, Spalding and Skegness	East Lincolnshire Broadcasting CIC	8B	June 2023	6 December 2024	—N/a
Bournemouth and Boscombe	BH Community DAB Limited	8B	October 2024	14 January 2026	
Bradford	Bradford Digital Media Ltd	8B		11 July 2022	DAB+: Akash Radio; Allstar Radio; Radio Apni Awaz; BritAsia Radio; Cosoro Radio; Culture City Radio; Dance Asia Radio; Drystone Radio; Great Yorkshire Radio; LDC Radio; Marefa Radio; My Greek Radio; Panjab Radio; Sunrise Radio Gold; Sunrise Radio; Voice of Islam Radio
Brighton	Brighton and Hove Digital Radio CIC	7D (Note: 9A during the trial period)	June 2024	28 December 2025 (Note: Originally on-air as a trial multiplex since 2015)	DAB+: 1BTN; 80s Rhythm; Angel Radio; Atmosphere Radio; CodeSouth.FM; Flex FM; Fresh Soundz; Gaydio; GlitterBeam; Mi-Soul; Passion Radio; Radio Caroline; Radio Reverb; Regency Radio; Resonance Extra; Select Radio; Slack City; Solar Radio; Southdown Radio; Starpoint Radio; University Radio Falmer
Cambridge	Cambridge Digital Radio Ltd	9C (Note: 7D during the trial period)		29 March 2022	DAB: Angel Radio; Cambridge 105; DAB+: Arena Radio; Radio Caroline; Future Radio; GlitterBeam; HCR FM; Laser 558; News Radio UK; Resonance Extra; Radio Xtra; Zack FM
Canterbury	Canterbury DAB CIC	7D	June 2024	22 January 2026	
Cardiff	Cardiff DAB Ltd	10D		27 October 2022	DAB+: Aspen Waite Radio; Bro Radio; Radio Cardiff; DanceLand; Easy Radio; Gaydio; News Radio UK; Rookwood Sound; Voice of Islam Radio; XL:UK Radio
Chelmsford	Chelmsford Digital Radio Limited	7D	June 2024	19 December 2025	
Cheshire East	Cheshire East DAB Ltd	11C		31 October 2023	DAB+: Cheshire's Mix 56; Cheshire's Silk Radio; Cosoro Radio; Happy Radio UK; Panacea Radio; Skylab Radio
Cheshire Mid	Niocast Digital Ltd (Note: Originally Cheshire Radio Ltd)	9C		12 October 2023	DAB+: Cosoro Radio; Strawberry Radio
Clevedon, Avonmouth and Filton	Severnside Digital Radio CIC	10D		14 November 2022	DAB: BCfm; Bradley Stoke Radio; Ujima Radio; DAB+: Decadance Radio; Fun Kids; Gaydio; Hub Radio; Kool FM; Select Radio; SWU.FM
Colchester	Essex DAB Limited	9A	June 2024	8 October 2025	
Congleton & Leek	Moorlands DAB Ltd	9A		1 May 2023	DAB+: Blue Sky Radio; Cheshire's Silk Radio; Churnet Sound; Happy Radio UK; Moorlands Radio; Timeless Radio; Skylab Radio
Coventry	Coventry Community Digital Radio CIC	9B		15 December 2022	DAB: Radio Panj; Panjab Radio; Vanny Radio; Voice of Islam Radio; DAB+: All Hits & Giggles; Blue Dot Radio; BritAsia Radio; Darbar Sahib Radio; GlitterBeam Radio; Radio Plus; Radio XL
Corby and Kettering	Kettering and Corby Broadcasting Company Limited	9B	April 2025	1 May 2026	
Crewe & Nantwich	South Cheshire DAB Ltd	7D		15 May 2023	DAB+: Blue Sky Radio; The Cat; Cheshire's Silk Radio
Darlington and Bishop Auckland	Durham Digital Ltd	9B		29 June 2023	DAB+: Aycliffe Radio; Bishop FM; Dance Revolution; Durham On Air; Frisk Radio; Nation Radio North East; Prince Bishops Hospital Radio; Together Radio
Derry	Foyle DAB Ltd	11C		2 August 2022	DAB+: Drive 105; Eirewave; Podcast Radio; River Radio; Voice of Islam Radio
Doncaster	Higher Rhythm Ltd	8A		19 August 2024	
Dudley & Stourbridge	DigiMux Ltd	8A		29 October 2022	DAB+: Black Country Radio; Black Country Xtra; BritAsia Radio; Darbar Sahib Radio; Gaydio; Gorgeous Radio; Skylab Radio; Switch Radio
East Bristol and Keynsham	Bristol Digital Radio CIC	9B (Note: 9A during the trial period)		10 November 2022	DAB: BCfm; Bradley Stoke Radio; Somer Valley FM; Ujima Radio; DAB+: BASE Radio; Decadance Radio; Fun Kids; Gaydio; Hub Radio; Kool FM; KTCR; Radio Maria England; Select Radio; SWU.FM
East Devon	ExeDAB Limited	9C	April 2025	2 March 2026	
Edinburgh	Edinburgh DAB Ltd	9B		4 July 2022	DAB+: 45 Radio; Awaz FM; BFBS Scotland; Celtic Music Radio; Chief Radio; Clarinet Easy; Fun Kids; Gaydio; Heartsong Live; London One Radio; Nation 80s; Quality Radio; Radio Saltire; Sami Swoi Radio; Voice of Islam Radio
Exeter	ExeDAB Ltd	9A		9 November 2022	DAB+: DevonAir Radio; Devoncast Radio; Diamond Groove UK; Radio Exe; Flashback; Phonic FM; South Devon Radio; Zest 60s
Glasgow	Glasgow DAB Ltd	10B		9 August 2022	DAB+: Awaz FM; Beat 106 Scotland; BritAsia Radio; BFBS Scotland; Celtic Music Radio; DanceLand; DanceLand Anthems; Darbar Sahib Radio; Gaydio; Heartsong Live; Jambo Radio; Like COUNTRY; Like ONE; Like POP; Like RETRO; Lomond Radio; Nation 70s; Nation 80s; Nation 90s; Panacea Radio; Quality Radio; Voice of Islam Radio
Glossop & Buxton	High Peak One Digital Ltd	8B		2 October 2023	DAB+: Greatest Hits Radio Midlands; High Peak 1; Like COUNTRY; Like ONE; Like POP; Like RETRO; North Derbyshire Radio
Halifax	Halifax DAB Limited	9C	December 2024	19 March 2026	
Harlow	Xtra DAB Limited	8B	June 2024	7 January 2026	
Hastings	Hastings Digital Radio CIC	7D	June 2024	13 January 2026	DAB+: 60s; Angel Gold; Angel Radio; Hastings Rock; Radio Caroline; Regency Radio; Seahaven FM; Visitor Radio
Huddersfield	Huddersfield DAB Limited	8A	December 2024	27 May 2026	
Hull	Hull DAB Ltd	9B		15 April 2024	DAB+: DanceLand; DanceLand Anthems; Diamond Groove UK; Great Yorkshire Radio; Humber Wave Radio; Like COUNTRY; Like ONE; Like POP; Like RETRO; Nation 80s; Nation 90s; Pop Hits
Huntingdon	Huntingdon Digital Limited	9A	May 2025	9 October 2026	
Inverclyde	Coast DAB Ltd	8B		1 August 2024	
Isle of Wight	Wight Digital Radio CIC	9A	October 2024	15 April 2026	
King's Lynn	North Norfolk Digital Ltd	9C		31 October 2022	DAB: Greatest Hits Radio East; DAB+: BBC Radio Norfolk; Cambridge 105; Radio Caroline; Future Radio; KL1 Radio; Radio Maria; Radio West Norfolk
Leeds	Leeds Digital Media Ltd	9A		25 October 2022	DAB+: Akash Radio; Allstar Radio; Radio Apni Awaz; Culture City Radio; Dance Asia Radio; Gaydio; LDC Radio; Marefa Radio; Mighty Radio Leeds; My Greek Radio; Rangoli Radio; Radio Sangam; Sunrise Radio Gold; Sunrise Radio; Voice Of Islam Radio
Leicester	Leicester Digital Partnership CIC	9B		8 March 2023	DAB: Radio2Funky; EAVA FM; Fun Kids; Kohinoor Radio FM; Leicester Community Radio; Nishaan Radio; Soar Sound; Radio Seerah; DAB+: BritAsia Radio; Darbar Sahib Radio
Liverpool	Liverpool DAB Ltd	7D		18 October 2023	DAB+: Atlantic 252; Radio Africana; Cosoro Radio; Dune Radio; Flame CCR; Gaydio; House Party Radio; Panacea Radio; Radio Maria England
Loughborough	Maxxwave Ltd	8A	July 2025	14 August 2025	
Ludlow	Murfin Media Digital Ltd	9B		11 March 2024	DAB+: Sunshine Radio
Luton	University of Bedfordshire	7D	June 2024	13 January 2026	DAB+: Diverse FM; Radio Caroline
Maidstone, Tonbridge and Tunbridge Wells	West Kent DAB Limited	8B	June 2024	14 January 2026	
Manchester and Salford	Manchester DAB CIC (Note: The trial was operated by Niocast Digital, who lost the bid for the permanent licence)	7D (Note: 10B during the trial period)		5 June 2023	DAB+: Radio Africana; ALL FM; Atlantic 252; The Buzz MCR; BritAsia Radio; Cheesy FM; Cosoro Radio; Gaydio; Happy Radio UK; Heritage Radio; Juice Radio; LMR Manchester; Love 80s MCR; Panacea Radio; R360 Radio; Radio X 90s; Reform Radio; Slack City Radio; Sunrise Radio; Unity Radio; Voice of Islam
Margate, Dover and Folkestone	Kent Coast DAB Limited	9B	June 2024	14 January 2026	
Merthyr Tydfil and Rhondda Cynon Taf	GTFM (South Wales) Ltd	9A	September 2023	12 March 2025	
Middlesbrough & Redcar	Erimux Ltd	8A		27 October 2023	DAB+: CVFM; Dance Asia Radio; Frisk Radio; Nation Radio North East; The Red; Zetland FM
Milton Keynes	MK Digital Media Ltd	9B		19 April 2024	DAB+: Akash Radio; Asian Community Radio MK; Horizon Radio; Rainbow Radio; Sunrise Radio
Newcastle & Gateshead	Tyneside Community Digital CIC	8A		1 July 2022	DAB+: 45 Radio; COG Grand Radio; Dance Revolution; Durham On Air; Frisk Radio; Gaydio; Halo Radio; Nation Radio North East; News Radio UK; Panjab Radio; Pride Radio; Spice FM; Together Radio; Radio Tyneside
Newport and Chepstow	Gwent Digital Broadcasting Ltd	9B		4 July 2024	DAB+: DanceLand; DanceLand Anthems; Gwent Radio; Like COUNTRY; Like ONE; Like POP; Like RETRO; Newport City Radio
Newry	UlsterMux Ltd	9C		15 July 2024	
North Ayrshire	North Ayrshire Broadcasting Ltd	9B	February 2025	24 January 2026	
North Birmingham	Switch Radio	9A		8 April 2022	DAB+: 45 Radio; Black Country Radio; Blue Dot Radio; BritAsia Radio; BRMB; Radio Caroline; Radio Central; Club Asia Radio; Cosoro Radio; Darbar Sahib Radio; Delite Radio; Fun Kids; Gaydio; Hope FM; Like ONE; London Greek Radio; Omega Radio; Panjab Radio; Raja Radio; Sabras Radio; Scratch Radio; Switch Radio; Unity FM; Voice of Islam Radio; Radio XL
North Buckinghamshire	Bucks DAB Ltd	8A	May 2023	12 June 2024	
North Pembrokeshire	West Wales DAB	8A	May 2023	24 October 2024	
North East London and South West Essex	East London and Essex Digital CIC	8A	June 2024	16 December 2025	DAB+: All Hit Radio; BritAsia Radio; Cyndicut Radio; Eruption Radio; Fresh Soundz; Phoenix FM; Pure FM; Gateway 97.8; WaveUp Radio
North London	U.DAB	9A	June 2024	8 December 2025	DAB+: Angel Radio; Asian Star Radio; The Beat London; Radio Caroline; Delite Radio; Desi Radio; Fun Kids, Greekbeat Radio; House FM; Kool FM; Liberty Radio; London Greek Radio; Nagrecha Radio; Polish Radio London; Radio Caroline; Rainbow Radio; Resonance Extra; Rinse FM; Ruach Radio; Select Radio; Shine 879; Soho Radio; Solar Radio; Starpoint Radio
Northampton	Northampton DAB CIC	7D		2 August 2024	DAB+: Embrace Radio; Inspiration FM; NLive Radio; Revolution Radio
Norwich	Future Digital Norfolk Ltd	9C (Note: 9A during the trial period)		10 October 2022	DAB: Angel Radio; Future Radio; DAB+: Cambridge 105; Radio Caroline; Cosoro Radio; News Radio UK; Laser 558; The Music Machine 1; The Music Machine 2; Resonance Extra; Select Radio; Skylab Radio; Slack City Radio; Solar Radio; Style Radio; Weather 24/7; Zack FM
Nottingham	Nottingham DAB Ltd	7D		26 January 2024	DAB: Omega Radio; DAB+: Boom Light; Boom Rock; BritAsia Radio; Fresh Soundz; Fun Kids; Radio Newark; 103 The Eye
Oldham and Rochdale	East Manchester DAB Ltd	9B		7 November 2023	DAB+: Atlantic 252; The Buzz MCR; Crescent Radio; Heritage Radio; Mom's Spaghetti; Oldham Community Radio; Roch Valley Radio
Oxford	OxDAB Ltd	8A		17 April 2024	DAB: WRFM; DAB+: BFBS Brize Norton; Diamond Groove UK; WRFM
Paisley and West Glasgow	Ross Inc Ltd	7D	February 2025	5 December 2025	
Peterborough	Hereward Digital Radio Ltd	7D		5 August 2024	
Petersfield	Provincial DAB Limited	8A	June 2024	10 January 2026	
Plymouth	PlymDAB Ltd	9C		8 November 2023	DAB+: Devoncast Radio; Radio Exe; Flashback; Hospital Radio Plymouth; Ocean City Radio; Phonic FM
Poole, Purbeck and Wimborne	Wide Digital Limited	9C	October 2024	20 March 2025	
Portadown and Craigavon	ABC Community SSDAB Limited	8A	March 2025	25 September 2026	
Portsmouth	Solent Wireless	8B (Note: 7D during the trial period)	June 2024	29 May 2025	DAB: Express FM; DAB+: 60s; 80s Rhythm; Angel Radio; Atmosphere Radio; BFBS Portsmouth; Birdsong; Radio Caroline; Easy Radio Portsmouth; Flash; Fun Kids; Gaydio; Nation 70s; Nation 80s; Nation 90s; Outreach Dance; Outreach Radio; Passion Radio; Pompey Sound; Slack City Radio; Starpoint Radio; Victory; Voice FM
Preston & Chorley	Preston DAB Ltd	9A		31 August 2023	DAB+: Central Radio NW; Dune Radio; Happy Radio UK; Juice Radio; Red Rose Radio
Ringwood, Verwood and Fordingbridge	Forest Community Radio Ltd	7D	July 2025	14 August 2026	DAB+: Bournemouth One; Forest FM; Hot Radio; Hot Gold; News Radio UK; Radio Caroline; Salisbury Radio
Rugby and Daventry	Maxxwave Limited	9A		8 December 2025	
Rutland and Stamford	Creativity Media Services Ltd	9C		15 April 2024	DAB: Embrace Radio; DAB+: Massive Hits; Rutland & Stamford Sound
Salisbury	Muxcast One Ltd (Nation Radio / BFBS)	8A		28 March 2022	DAB: Greatest Hits Radio South; Nation Radio South Coast; DAB+: Angel Radio; Aspen Waite Radio; BBC Radio Wiltshire; BFBS Salisbury; Boom Light; Easy Radio; Nation 60s; Nation 00s; Nation Dance; Nation Love; Nation Rocks; Outreach Dance; Outreach Radio; Salisbury Radio; Xtra Hot
Sheffield & Rotherham	Shefcast Digital Ltd	9C		11 August 2022	DAB+: 45 Radio; Radio Essentials; Gaydio; GlitterBeam Radio; Link FM; Rother Radio; Rotherham Radio; Radio Sangam; Sheffield Live
Sittingbourne and Medway Towns	Medway and Swale DAB Limited	9A	June 2024	7 January 2026	
South Birmingham	South Birmingham Digital Radio Ltd	9C		14 December 2022	DAB+: Ambur Radio; Radio Apni Awaz; Big City Radio; Blue Dot Radio; BritAsia Radio; BRMB; Brumside Radio; Club Asia Radio; Darbar Sahib Radio; Fun Kids; Gaydio; Gulshan Radio; Radio Maria England; Nation Radio UK; Fun Kids; Sabras Radio; Sanskar Radio; Switch Radio; Unity FM; Voice of Islam Radio; Radio XL
South Craven, Wharfedale and Worth Valley	Aire Wharfe DAB Limited	9B	December 2024	1 May 2026	
South Gloucestershire	South Glos Digital	9A		16 September 2024	
South Hertfordshire	South Herts DAB	9C	June 2024	20 January 2025	
South East London and North West Kent	GreenDAB Ltd	9C	June 2024	19 January 2026	DAB+: All Hit Radio; East London Radio; Fresh Soundz; BritAsia Radio; CPR FM; GlitterBeam; Select Radio; Solar Radio
South London	South of the River Digital Limited	9A	June 2024	13 October 2025	DAB+: Cosoro Radio; Croydon Radio; Culture City Radio; Flex FM; London Music Radio; Persian Mix Radio; Riverside Radio; Select Radio; Subjam; Westside Radio
South Pembrokeshire	Pure West Radio	9A	May 2023	24 October 2024	
Southampton	Southampton Digital Radio Ltd	9B		1 August 2024	DAB+: Awaaz Radio; Fiesta FM UK; Outreach Dance; Outreach Radio; Voice FM Music
Southend & South East Essex	City DAB	9C	June 2024	16 December 2024	DAB+: Actual Radio; All Hit Radio; Atomix.UK; Cyndicut Radio; Digital City Radio; Essex Hits; Gateway 97.8; Phoenix FM
Stirling & Falkirk	Central FM	9C		1 November 2023	DAB+: Central FM; Edge 1; Edge 2; Forth Valley Radio; Radio Royal
Stockport	Stockport Community SSDAB Ltd	8A		29 August 2023	DAB+: Atlantic 252; Buzz MCR; Cheshire's Mix 56; DanceLand; DanceLand Anthems; Darbar Sahib Radio; Fun Kids; Gaydio; Happy Radio UK; Heritage Radio; Like COUNTRY; Like ONE; Like POP; Like RETRO; Radio Maria England; Nifty Radio UK; Panacea Radio; Pie Radio; R360 Radio; Skylab Radio; Strawberry Radio; Voice of Islam Radio; Wythenshawe FM
Stoke & Newcastle-under-Lyme	Alternative Broadcast Company	8A		3 July 2023	DAB+: 6 Towns Radio; Blue Sky Radio; Radio Caroline; Churnet Sound; Cross Rhythms; Moorlands Radio
Sunderland	Muxcast 6 Limited	7D	December 2024	23 May 2026	
Swansea	Swansea Digital Broadcasting Limited	7D	March 2025	24 September 2026	
Swindon & Marlborough	Community Radio Swindon Ltd	8B		15 March 2024	DAB+: Funky Corner Radio; Swindon 105.5
Telford and Shrewsbury	Maxxwave Ltd	9C	May 2026	26 June 2026	
Torbay	TorDAB Ltd	8B		9 November 2023	DAB+: DevonAir Radio; Devoncast Radio; Radio Exe; Flashback; Ocean Youth; South Devon Radio
Tynemouth & South Shields	Redarmy Group Ltd	9B		1 December 2021	DAB+: The Cat; Cross Rhythms; Dance Revolution; Durham On Air; Frisk Radio; Nation 80s; Nation Hits; Nation Classic Hits; Nation Radio North East; Nation Xmas; Pride Radio; Radio Shields; Spice FM; Radio Tyneside
Walsall	Walsall DAB Limited	9B	May 2025	22 October 2025	
Warminster, Devizes and Trowbridge	West Wiltshire DAB CIC	9C	October 2024	16 April 2026	
Warrington, Widnes & Runcorn	Warrington, Widnes & Runcorn DAB Ltd	8B		17 August 2023	DAB+: Radio Africana; Cheshire's Mix 56; Cosoro Radio; Happy Radio UK; House Party Radio; Panacea Radio; Radio Warrington
West London	City West Digital CIC	8B	June 2024	15 October 2025	Akash Radio; Backstage Radio; Brooklands Radio; Desi Radio; Flex FM; London Music Radio; Persian Mix Radio; Westside Radio
Wetherby	Wetherby Community Radio Limited	9C	May 2025	14 December 2025	
Wigan	Wigan and St Helens DAB Limited	9C	December 2024	19 May 2026	
Winchester	Winchester DAB Ltd	9C		29 September 2022 (Note: Off-air between November 2023 and February 2024 due to the collapse of the original operator, UK DAB Networks)	DAB+: Awaaz Radio; Outreach Classic; Outreach Dance; Outreach Radio; Voice FM; Winchester Radio
Wolverhampton	Wolverhampton DAB Ltd	7D		1 April 2023	DAB: Omega Radio; Panjab Radio; DAB+: Ambur Radio; Blue Dot Radio; BritAsia Radio; Darbar Sahib Radio; Gorgeous Radio; Skylab Radio; Unity FM; WCR FM; Radio XL
Wrexham	Wrexham DAB Ltd	9B		11 November 2023	DAB+: DanceLand; DanceLand Anthems; Like COUNTRY; Like ONE; Like POP; Like RETRO; Nation 60s; Nation 70s; Nation 90s; Wrexham Premier Radio
Yeovil	Radio Ninesprings	9A	May 2025	29 October 2026	
York	York Digital Radio CIC	8B		10 April 2024	DAB+: Diamond Groove UK; University Radio York; YO1 Radio; York Hospital Radio

=== Trial multiplexes ===
Small-scale multiplexes were initially licensed by Ofcom for a trial period allowing a "more affordable way for smaller stations to broadcast on DAB digital radio". The Aldershot and Woking trial was discontinued in November 2025 while the others have received full licences:

Licence area	Multiplex operator	Channel	On-air date	Closure date	Stations
Aldershot & Woking	BFBS Aldershot	8A	19 October 2015	14 November 2025	DAB: Angel Radio; BFBS Aldershot; BFBS Gurkha Radio; Radio Caroline; Radio Woking; DAB+: B Radio; Brooklands Radio; Care Radio; Outreach Dance; Outreach Radio; V2 Radio

=== Future multiplexes ===
Licence area	Multiplex operator	Channel	Licence granted
Ards Peninsula	East Antrim Community SSDAB Limited	8B	July 2025
Armagh	NIDAB Limited	9B	March 2026
Ayr, Troon and Irvine	Muxcast 9 Ltd	9A	February 2025
Ballymena	NIDAB Limited	8B	April 2026
Banbury and Bicester	Maxxwave Limited	9C	September 2025
Barnsley	Barnsley Community Media CIC	9B	April 2026
Bridgwater	Sedgemoor FM CIC	7D	July 2025
Burton upon Trent	Maxxwave Limited	8B	June 2026
Carlisle and Penrith	Cumbria Digital Limited	7D	April 2025
Cheltenham and Tewkesbury	TLRC (Radio Investments) Limited	9C	June 2026
Chester	Niocast Digital Ltd	8A	May 2026
Chippenham and Malmesbury	North Wiltshire DAB Ltd	7D	May 2026
Coleraine	NIDAB Ltd	9C	May 2026
Cookstown and Dungannon	NIDAB Ltd	7D	June 2026
Cumbernauld and Coatbridge	Tower DAB Ltd	8A	February 2025
Derby	Derby DAB Limited	9C	March 2026
Ely and March	Fen Radio Limited	12A	December 2025
Enniskillen	Ulstermux Limited	9C	September 2025
Exmouth and Dawlish	Exmouth DAB Ltd	TBA	July 2025
Guildford and Woking	Woking, Aldershot, and Guildford SSDAB Limited	7D	March 2026
Lanarkshire	Lanarkshire DAB Ltd	9B	February 2025
Lancaster	North Lancashire DAB Limited	7D	November 2025
Leamington Spa and Stratford-upon-Avon	Maxxwave Limited	8A	June 2026
Lincoln	Maxxwave Limited	9B	April 2026
Market Harborough	Creativity Media Services Limited	7D	December 2025
Newbury	Kennet DAB Ltd	8A	May 2026
North Somerset	Bath Digital Radio CIC	9A	November 2025
Nuneaton and Hinckley	Maxxwave Limited	7D	May 2025
Oban	Caledonia TX Limited	9A	November 2025
Reading	Local Radio Limited	9C	June 2024
Skye and Lochalsh	Craoladh Digiteach Ionadail Limited	9B	June 2026
South Hams	Stellaria Media Limited	7D	June 2026
South West Fife	C.I. Broadcasting Limited	7D	April 2026
South West Sussex	West Sussex Digital Radio Limited	9C	April 2026
Stockton-on-Tees	RedArmy Group Limited	TBA	September 2025
Taunton	Taunton TX Limited	8A	November 2025
Ullapool	Craoladh Digiteach Iondail Ltd	9A	May 2026
Wakefield and Castleford	Mid Yorkshire DAB Limited	7D	December 2025
Wellingborough	Steers Media Limited	8B	December 2025
West Oxfordshire	WOXDAB CIC	TBA	November 2025
Western Isles	Craoladh Digiteach Ionadail Limited	9C	September 2025
Weston-super-Mare	North Somerset Digital Radio Limited	9C	September 2025
Weymouth, Dorchester and Bridport	Wide Digital Limited	9C	March 2026
Worcester	Murfin Media (Digital) Limited	7D	September 2025

== See also ==
- List of radio stations in the United Kingdom
- Digital radio in the United Kingdom
