= 89.6 FM =

FM radio frequency

The following radio stations broadcast on FM frequency 89.6 MHz:

== Indonesia ==
- PM2FGM / Publica FM in Jakarta
- PM3FAE / Visi FM in Medan
- XBT FM (PM2___) in West Lombok

== Bangladesh ==
- Dhaka Radio Today 89.6

== Greece ==
- Ioannina Radio DeeJay 89.6

== China ==
- CNR The Voice of China in Yunfu

== Lithuania ==
- Radiocentras in Vilnius

== Malaysia ==
- IKIMfm di Kuantan, Pahang

== New Zealand ==
- The Hits, Wanganui

== United Kingdom ==
- Westside 89.6FM, Hanwell, Greater London

== India ==
- 89.6 FM Sikar-Shahar Ki Dharkan, Sikar, Rajasthan, India
