= 106.8 FM =

FM radio frequency

This is a list of notable radio stations that broadcast on FM frequency 106.8 MHz:

== China (mainland) ==
- CNR Music Radio in Guilin
- CNR The Voice of China in Mudanjiang
- TJTRS Tianjin Traffic Radio

== Hong Kong ==
- RTHK Radio 3

== Ireland ==
- Sunshine 106.8 in Dublin

== Lithuania ==
- M-1

== Malaysia ==
- Gegar in Kuala Terengganu, Terengganu

== New Zealand ==
- George FM (Taranaki frequency)

== Russia ==
- Europa Plus (Kazan frequency)

== United Kingdom ==
- More Radio Mid-Sussex (Lewes frequency)
- Nation Radio North East (Durham frequency)
- Farnborough Airshow Radio
- Greatest Hits Radio Oxfordshire (Oxford frequency)
- Smooth East Midlands (Peterborough frequency)
- KMFM Shepway and White Cliffs Country (Dover frequency)
- Nation Radio Wales (South East Wales frequency)
- Original 106 (Aberdeen)
- Phonic FM
- Greatest Hits Radio West Yorkshire (Wakefield frequency)
- Rinse FM
- Time 106.8 (closed April 2009)
