= Digital switchover in the United Kingdom =

Digital switchover in the United Kingdom may refer to:

- Digital terrestrial television in the United Kingdom § Digital switchover, completed
- Digital radio in the United Kingdom § Analogue switch-over, future
