= London One Radio =

Radio station in the United Kingdom

London One Radio is an independent, commercial, online radio station in the United Kingdom that serves London's Italian community. Established in 2014 by journalist Filippo Baglini as the UK's first Italian-language radio station, it produces programming both in English and Italian, and plays both British and Italian music. It is based at Tottenham Hale. Notable programmes on the station include Football Talks, launched in January 2021 and presented by FIFA agent Giulio Tedeschi. In April 2021 it was reported that London One Radio's listenership had increased by 41% during the COVID-19 pandemic.

On 25 July 2022, the station joined small-scale DAB in Edinburgh to serve the Italian community, with plans for several events in the city.
