= Radio Exe =

Coordinates: 50.699°N 3.525°W

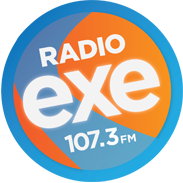
- Exeter; England
- Broadcast area: Devon and west Dorset
- Frequencies: FM: 107.3 MHz; DAB
- Branding: Radio Exe

Programming
- Language: English
- Format: Adult contemporary

Ownership
- Owner: Nation Broadcasting

History
- First air date: 18 February 2008 (as Exeter FM); 10 January 2012 (as Radio Exe)
- Former names: Exeter FM (2008–2012)

Links
- Webcast: Radio Exe Devon; Radio Exe Plymouth; Radio Exe Flashback; Devoncast Radio; Ignite Radio
- Website: www.radioexe.co.uk

Radio Exe (formerly Exeter FM) is an Independent Local Radio station based in Exeter, Devon, England, which broadcasts across Devon and West Dorset.

As of August 2026, the station broadcasts to a weekly audience of 53,000, according to RAJAR.

== Presenters ==
Presenters include Matt Rogers, Neil Walker, Ashley Jeary, Dean Brame, Jamie Taylor, Brad Hardware, Matt Rogan and Saira Franklin.

== History ==
Exeter FM launched on 18 February 2008 as part of the London-based Sunrise Radio Group.

In June 2011, the station was taken over by Exe Broadcasting Ltd, a new company owned by local broadcaster Paul Nero. The station relaunched as Radio Exe on Tuesday 10 January 2012 at 7:55 am, when breakfast presenter Ben Clark played the first song on air, which was The River of Dreams by Billy Joel. In August 2016, Devon Radio Ltd, owned fully by Celador Radio, sold their 40% share in Radio Exe. This also led to the resignation of Paul Smith, a director of the station who was also the chairman of Celador, resulting in the station becoming 100% locally controlled and owned.

In 2020, during the COVID-19 pandemic, the station launched an emergency fundraising drive to keep the station local due to a lack of advertising revenue and other factors. The fundraiser was successful with £45,919 raised.

=== Digital radio ===
Radio Exe broadcasts its primary DAB service on the NOWdigital local digital multiplex serving south and north Devon; added in 2017, the move brought the station's output to listeners across much of the county, including those areas of North Devon which the multiplex had been expanded to cover in 2012.

On 4 March 2022, Radio Exe launched on the Plymouth DAB multiplex. This move expanded its coverage to encompass the whole of West Devon.

In 2020, Ofcom advertised a smallscale local DAB multiplex for Exeter (as part of a range of new such multiplexes being commissioned across the country). The Exeter licence was won by ExeDAB, a consortium of Radio Exe, Exeter community station Phonic FM and Torbay community service Riviera FM. This multiplex began broadcasting in November 2022.

In 2022, Ofcom advertised a similar multiplex for Torbay. TorDAB, a consortium of Radio Exe, online station South Devon Radio and newspaper publisher Clear Sky Publishing competed for the franchise against a rival consortium including Riviera FM, Like Media and UK DAB Networks Ltd, a firm which manages several other of the smallscale licences around the UK. In January 2023 TorDAB was awarded the licence.

In March 2023 a smallscale multiplex to serve Plymouth was awarded to PlymDAB Ltd, a firm backed by Radio Exe in partnership with Exeter Community Radio Ltd, Hospital Radio Plymouth and Westward Media Ltd - this was chosen by Ofcom in preference to a rival bid (Plymouth DAB Ltd) whose backers included Like Media and UK DAB Networks, with Riviera FM a minority stakeholder.

The PlymDAB and TorDAB multiplexes both went live in early November 2023.

On 22 August 2023 Radio Exe launched a spin-off DAB+ and Internet service, Radio Exemas, which carries exclusively festive music. It is believed to be the first station in the English-speaking world to adopt a full-time Christmas format for the 2023 holiday season. Initially intended to last only through Epiphany, Radio Exemas remained live into early March 2024, when it was replaced with the Devoncast until Radio Exemas was reactivated in August 2024. Radio Exemas did not return for 2025.

== Purchase by Nation Broadcasting ==
In April 2026, Radio Exe was purchased by Nation Broadcasting, who are known for their Nation Radio network, which was also launched in Devon in April. This marks the end of Radio Exe being a fully locally owned and controlled station.

Since the end of May 2026, the Radio Exe website now redirects to Nation Player and has the same design as all the other Nation Broadcasting-owned stations. Radio Exe's branding remains unchanged, and the station's day-to-day operations and programming continue to be overseen by Programme Manager and Drivetime presenter Ashley Jeary, who has been with the station since its launch in 2012. Radio Exemas was merged into Nation Xmas and is now offered year-round under the latter brand.
