= Sunrise Radio (Yorkshire) =

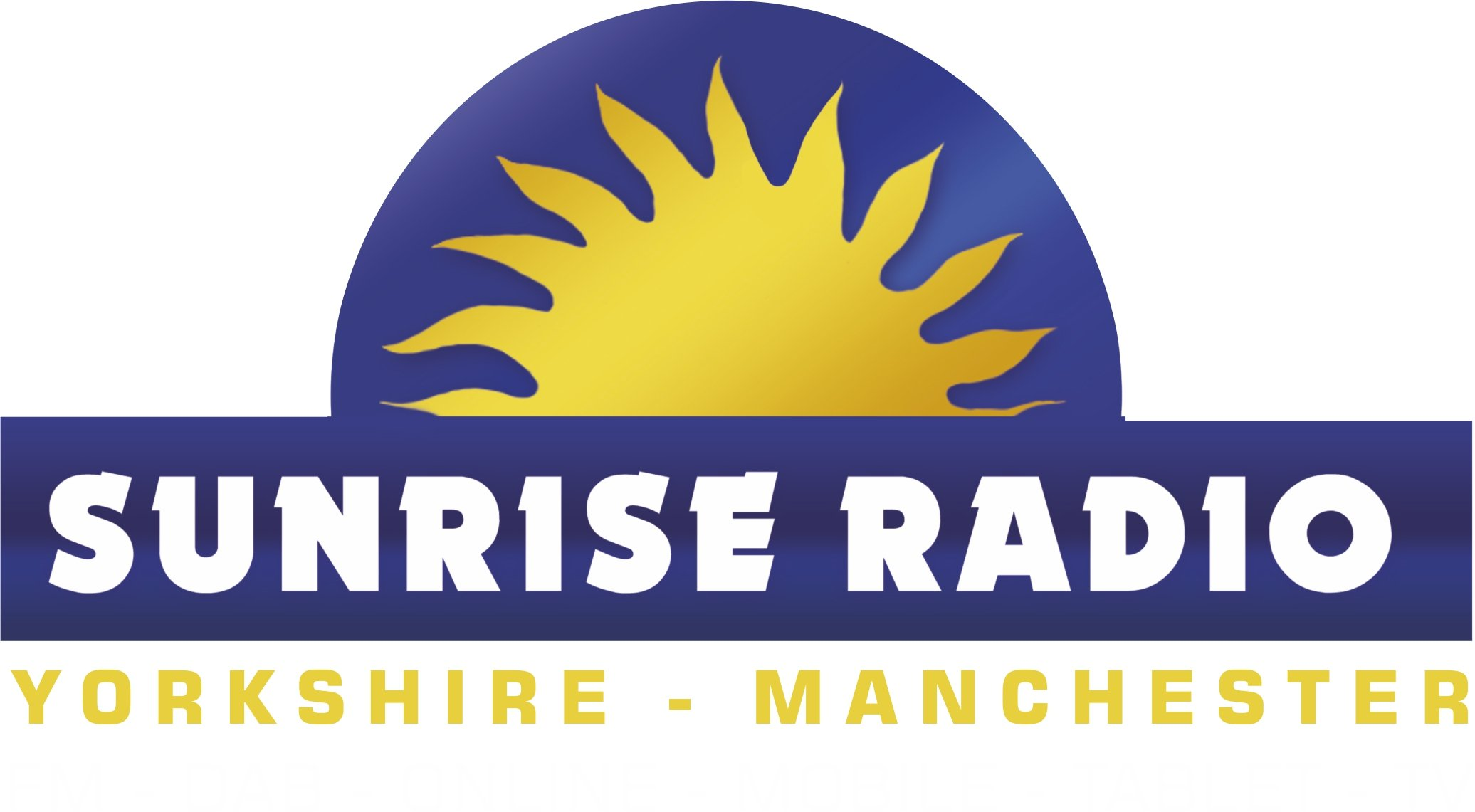
- Bradford; England
- Broadcast area: West Yorkshire and parts of northern and central England
- Frequencies: FM: 100.6 MHz and 103.2 MHz; DAB+: Bradford, Leeds, Halifax, Manchester, East Lancashire, Milton Keynes, parts of the Aire and Wharfe valleys and West London

Programming
- Languages: English, Hindi, Punjabi and Urdu
- Format: Asian music and community programming

Ownership
- Owner: Bradford City Radio Ltd
- Sister stations: Sunrise Radio Gold

History
- First air date: 9 December 1989; 36 years ago

Technical information
- Transmitter coordinates: 53.8329°N 1.7521°W

Links
- Webcast: www.sunriseradio.fm
- Website: www.sunriseradio.fm

Sunrise Radio, also known as Sunrise Radio Yorkshire, is a British commercial Asian radio station based in Bradford, West Yorkshire. It is owned and operated by Bradford City Radio Ltd and broadcasts Asian music, news, entertainment and community programming. The station began broadcasting on 9 December 1989 and is available on FM, DAB+, online, through mobile applications and on compatible smart-speaker and television platforms.

== History ==
Sunrise Radio was launched as Bradford City Radio in December 1989. It was established to provide music, news and community programming for the diverse communities of Bradford and the surrounding areas. The station later adopted the Sunrise Radio name and expanded beyond its original Bradford FM coverage through additional FM transmitters, digital radio services and online broadcasting. In 2020, Bradford City Radio Ltd launched sister service Sunrise Radio Gold, which concentrates on classic Asian music.

== Broadcasting ==
Sunrise Radio broadcasts 24 hours a day. Its FM services are transmitted on: 103.2 FM – Bradford and surrounding parts of West Yorkshire 100.6 FM – Calderdale, Keighley and surrounding areas The station is also carried on DAB and DAB+ digital radio multiplexes serving: Bradford, Leeds, Halifax and Calderdale; Manchester, East Lancashire, Milton Keynes, South Craven, Wharfedale and the Worth Valley, including Keighley, Skipton and Ilkley, West London.

Sunrise Radio is also available through its website, mobile applications, internet radio platforms, smart speakers and compatible connected television services.

== Programming ==
The station's music output includes contemporary and classic Bollywood music, Bhangra, Punjabi music, Asian pop, ghazals and Qawwali. Programming also includes entertainment, listener phone-ins, specialist music programmes, competitions, interviews, local information and news bulletins. Sunrise Radio works with charities, voluntary organisations, businesses and community groups across its broadcast areas. Its presenters and staff also participate in community events, cultural celebrations and melas.

== Management ==
The station is operated by Bradford City Radio Ltd. Usha Parmar is the station's chief executive, while Raj Parmar is a director of the company. In November 2025, they represented Sunrise Radio at the WorldDAB Summit in Antwerp, where they discussed the station's expansion through DAB+ and its involvement in the development of small-scale digital radio multiplexes.

== Awards and recognition ==
Regional Radio Station of the Year, 2016 Asian Media Awards.

== See also ==
- List of radio stations in the United Kingdom
- Digital radio in the United Kingdom
