= GlitterBeam =

Multi-Regional Radio Station

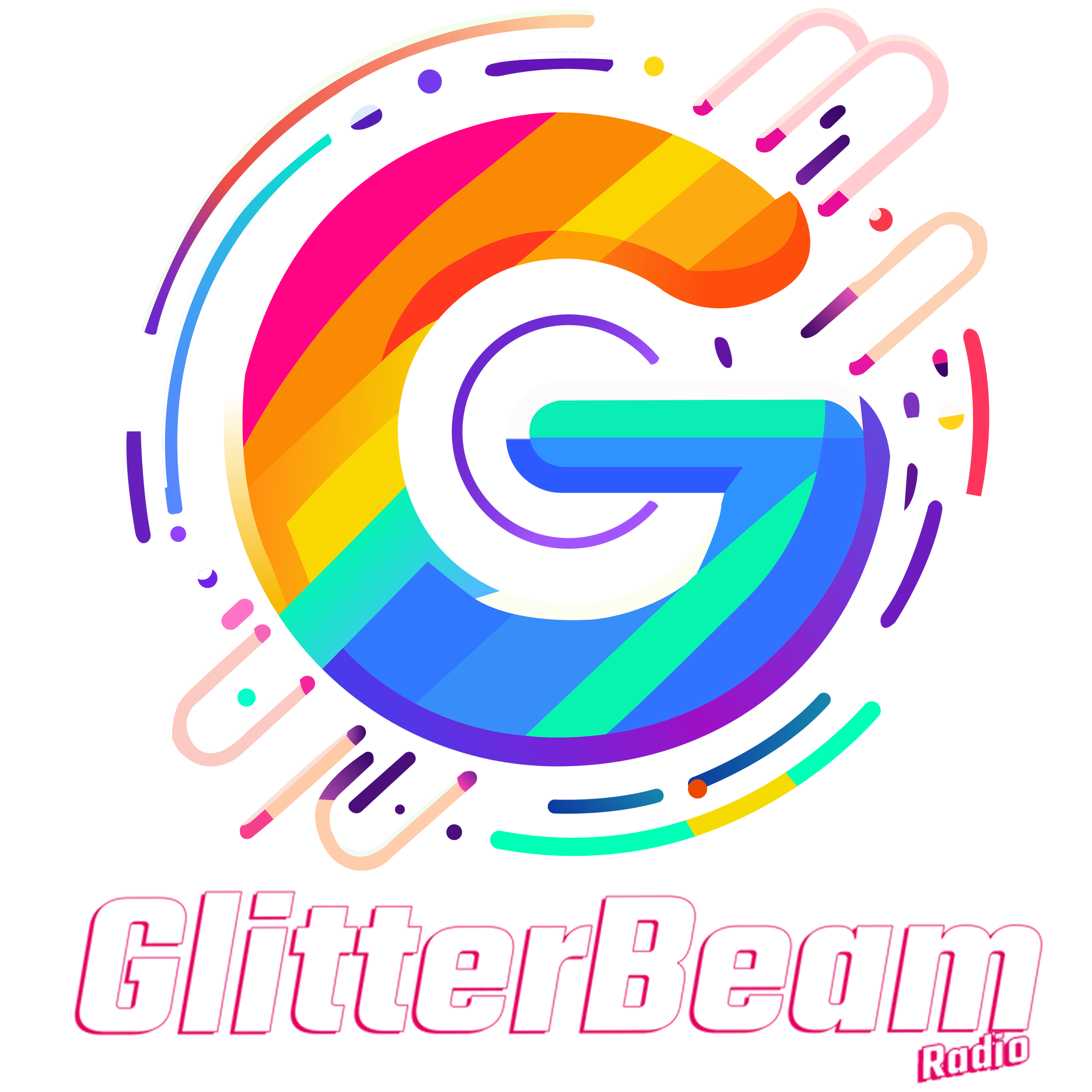
- Gravesend; United Kingdom
- Broadcast area: United Kingdom
- Frequency: DAB
- Branding: "Music with Sparkle"

Programming
- Language: English
- Format: CHR/Pop

History
- First air date: 14 July 2019

Links
- Website: www.glitterbeam.co.uk

GlitterBeam is a multi-regional digital radio station broadcasting across the United Kingdom and Malta. It was launched on 14 July 2019.

== History ==
Founded in 2019 by Eugenio Ceriello and Michael Dalzell, GlitterBeam originally launched as an online-only radio station. Following the good reception from the public, GlitterBeam went on to launch in several other cities across the UK as part of the Ofcom small-scale DAB trial and later the permanent small scale DAB services in Cambridgeshire, Blackpool, York, Norfolk, Sheffield, Rotherham, Coventry and Brighton. The station also broadcast nationwide on DAB in Malta. The station's slogan is "Proud to Be Different".

GlitterBeam operates a number of audio splits, used for targeted localised advertising and content. The music programming is "uplifting" pop and dance music, with the tagline "Music with Sparkle". The station is entirely run by volunteers.

In 2022, following the Russian invasion of Ukraine, the station dedicated special programming to the LGBTQ+ community in Ukraine with interviews.

In 2024, one of the presenters, Dean Quinton, became a housemate in the reality show Big Brother.

An Italian version of the station, GlitterBeam Italia, was launched in 2024 with an entire team of Italian presenters. In 2026 GlitterBeam Italia became available on Malta's DAB+.

The station runs a yearly charity radiothon called "30 Hours for a Rainbow" with 2 presenters live in the studio for 32 hours, joined by guests and in partnership with venues across the UK.

== Awards and nominations ==
Year	Association	Category	Nominee(s)	Result
2019	Rainbow Honours	Brand of The Year	GlitterBeam	Nominated
2020	National Diversity Awards	Community Organisation Award	GlitterBeam	Nominated
2024	Rainbow Honours	Brand of The Year	GlitterBeam	Nominated
