= Select Radio =

- United Kingdom
- Broadcast area: London (FM), Norwich (DAB+), Brighton (DAB+), Bristol (DAB+)
- Frequency: 94.4 FM

Programming
- Format: House, disco, electronic dance music

History
- First air date: 2003 (pirate station); November 2021 (Community license)

Links
- Website: selectradioapp.com

Select Radio (formerly Select UK) is a London-based radio station, broadcasting on 94.4 FM to London and online, playing primarily house music. The station first broadcast as a pirate radio station in 2003, for many years on 99.3 FM before moving online. It applied for a legal licence in May 2019 which it was awarded with a community radio licence by Ofcom in May 2020, and commenced broadcasting in November 2021. Select Radio extended its broadcast area to include Norwich on DAB+ in April 2022 and Brighton on DAB+ in August 2022.

DJs include Above & Beyond, Oliver Heldens, Roger Sanchez, and Paul van Dyk.
