= BritAsia TV =

- Country: United Kingdom
- Headquarters: Birmingham

Ownership
- Owner: Tony Shergill

History
- Launched: 7 April 2008

Links
- Website: britasia.tv

BritAsia TV is British media network aimed at a British Asian audience. Its television channel launched in 2008 and radio station in 2020, and is known for the BritAsia TV Music Awards.

The channel was available on Sky Satellite television between 2008 and 2025. Between 2017 and 2020 the channel was also available on Virgin Media cable.

On 8 January 2025, BritAsia TV ceased linear operations on satellite TV in favour of digital-only distribution and digital radio.

In August 2017 the channel outsourced its playout operations to ABS Broadcasting. In 2017 the channel changed ownership from brothers Jaz and Davy Bal to a consortium with Tony Shergill as CEO.

The new ownership significantly saved the channel's declining ratings by introducing a new vision for the channel and making the channel available to watch in North America (Canada & America), India, Africa and Australia with monthly viewing figures currently averaging 1 million viewers per month.

In 2018 BritAsia TV established the Punjabi Film Awards to support and acknowledge the contributions made by Punjabi Cinema, the first of its kind to be held outside of India. The event saw some of the biggest names from Punjabi Music and Cinema attend such as Gippy Grewal, Sharry Mann, Gurpreet Ghuggi, Satinder Sartaaj, Tarseem Jassar, Jasmin Sandlas and more.

The JW Mariott Grosvenor House Hotel London played host to the BritAsia TV Punjabi Film Awards (PFA) on Saturday, March 30, 2019.The awards celebrated the very best of Punjabi Films during 2018. There were also awards for special recognition and outstanding achievement on the night. The event saw the likes of Steel Banglez, Jaz Dhami, Sonam Bajwa, Gippy Grewal, Sidhu Moosewala, Harbhajan Mann, Binnu Dhillon, and Mahek Bukhari in attendance.

The BritAsia TV Music Awards is an annual event held by the channel which has seen some of the biggest artists perform at some of the biggest venues in the world. In 2018 the awards were held in Wembley Arena which saw Sidhu Moose Wala, Mist (rapper) & Stefflon Don. headline with the track 47 produced by Steel Banglez.

It was reported that both Banglez and Sidhu Moose Wala met at the Punjabi Film awards in 2018 and as a result of being in attendance they confirmed the deal for a collaboration then.

In 2019, BritAsia TV launched a new chart and programme in partnership with the Official Charts Company detailing the world's top Punjabi music.

In august 2026, BritAsia TV was launched on Sky Glass and Sky Stream in HD:

== BritAsia Radio ==
BritAsia TV launched BritAsia Radio in June 2020 across parts of the UK on DAB.
