= Digital City Radio =

Radio Station

- England
- Broadcast area: Southend-on-Sea
- Frequencies: 103.7 FM; 9C (Southend and South Essex SSDAB)

Programming
- Format: Music radio, UK-centric urban dance music

History
- First air date: 1 April 2016 (as Funky SX)

Links
- Website: www.digitalcityradio.com

Digital City Radio (formerly Funky SX) is an Essex-based community radio station, licensed for The Real Sound of Young Essex.

Funky SX originated as an internet radio station in 2009, and was awarded a legal community license in 2015. The station commenced broadcasting on 1 April 2016 on 103.7 FM playing urban dance music including house, garage, grime, dance, drum & bass.

In March 2025, the station was rebranded to Digital City Radio.
