= Pride Radio (North East) =

English radio station

North East England; United Kingdom
- Broadcast area: Tynemouth & South Shields • Newcastle and Gateshead • South Durham
- Frequencies: DAB: 8A (N&G); 9B (T&SS, SD); and 89.2FM
- RDS: PRIDE RADIO

Programming
- Language: English

Ownership
- Owner: Pride Community Network Ltd

History
- First air date: 2010

Links
- Website: www.prideradio.co.uk

Pride Radio, also known as Pride Radio North East, is a local radio station serving the people of the North East of England and broadcasts worldwide online.

== History ==
Pride Radio launched online in 2010. Due to the station's growth, shows are now broadcast on 89.2FM, DAB, in North East England and worldwide online and also via Freeview. Pride Radio is run by Pride Community Network Ltd; a not-for-profit organisation that aims to raise awareness of LGBT+ issues, health initiatives and promote social inclusion and diversity through broadcasts and events.

In 2020 and 2023, North East television personality Scarlett Moffatt and The X Factor singer Joe McElderry presented festive programmes for the station.

== Notable presenters ==
- Jonathan Morrell, also a producer at BBC Radio Cumbria
- Simon Logan, also a broadcaster on BBC Radio Newcastle and BBC Radio Tees
- Kelly Scott, also a broadcaster on BBC Radio Newcastle and BBC Radio Tees.
