= Rother Radio =

- Rotherham; United Kingdom
- Broadcast area: Rotherham, Sheffield, Doncaster & Thorne, South Yorkshire
- Frequencies: DAB: 9C Rotherham & Sheffield, 8A Doncaster & Thorne.

Programming
- Format: Adult contemporary

Ownership
- Owner: Rotherham Broadcasting CIC

History
- First air date: 28 September 2020

Links
- Webcast: Listen Live
- Website: www.rotherradio.co.uk

Rother Radio is a local community radio station serving Rotherham and Sheffield in South Yorkshire, England. It is operated by Rotherham Broadcasting CIC.

== History ==
Rother Radio launched on the 28 September 2020 to provide a local community radio service for South Yorkshire after the area's previous local station, Rother FM, became part of the Greatest Hits Radio national network. It is the successor to a previous online station named Hit Music Radio, which began in 2003.

Initially, the station launched online only before obtaining an Ofcom DAB licence. The station launched on the Shefcast Digital Multiplex on 29 August 2022.

In February 2024, Ofcom announced that the station was one of 14 nationwide to receive funding.

== Programming ==
The station produces presenter-led programming from 7am to 12am weekdays and from 8am to 12am on the weekend. Rother Radio has a team of twelve presenters.

== Transmission ==
Rother Radio can be heard on Digital Audio Broadcasting (DAB) across Rotherham and Sheffield on the Shefcast multiplex. In August 2023 the station joined the UK Radio Portal DTT (Digital Terrestrial Television) Service on Freeview channel 277, broadcasting on the ITV Yorkshire (South) Macro Region. As of 30 April 2024, the station also broadcasts on Freely channel 566.

On 22 July 2025, the station expanded its coverage and began broadcasting on the Doncaster DAB.
