= Amar Radio =

Radio station in London, England

Coordinates: 51.50455°N 0.37669°W

Amar Radio is a community radio channel, aimed at the Asian community. Based in Southall, London, it was launched on 27 June 2002 as Akash Radio.

During May 2010, Akash Radio had a change of management with the name, imaging and content all undergoing a refresh. Akash Radio became known as Amar Radio. In December 2010, Jaswant Singh, the President of Southall's Miri Piri Gurdwara bought Amar Radio with plans to give the station an overhaul.

Amar Radio is accessible via its website worldwide and features popular discussion, cultural, and bhangra shows. Amar Radio was available across the United Kingdom and Ireland from Sky Digital until 15 August 2011.

The station has won two Asian award nominations for best radio station, and is a sponsor of shows and melas within the local community.
