= Shine 879 =

- London; England
- Frequencies: 87.9 FM (as a Pirate); 12D DAB (Essex); 10C DAB (Surrey, Sussex & South London); 10D DAB (Herts, Beds & Bucks); 9A DAB (North London)

Programming
- Format: House, UK garage, disco, dance music, DnB, Old Skool

History
- First air date: 1997 (as a pirate); 26 February 2022 (DAB)

Links
- Website: shinedab.com

Shine 879 is a regional London-based online and DAB radio station playing house, UK garage, disco, and other genres of dance music across the South East of England. Shine 879 originally started life as Shine FM, a pirate radio station broadcasting from East London and Essex from 1997 until 2012.

Having initially returned online, on 26 February 2022 commenced broadcasting on the Essex NOW fm multiplex. In August 2024, Shine expanded its coverage to 3 addition multiplex areas covering Surrey, Sussex, London, Herts, Beds and Bucks.
