= Switch Radio =

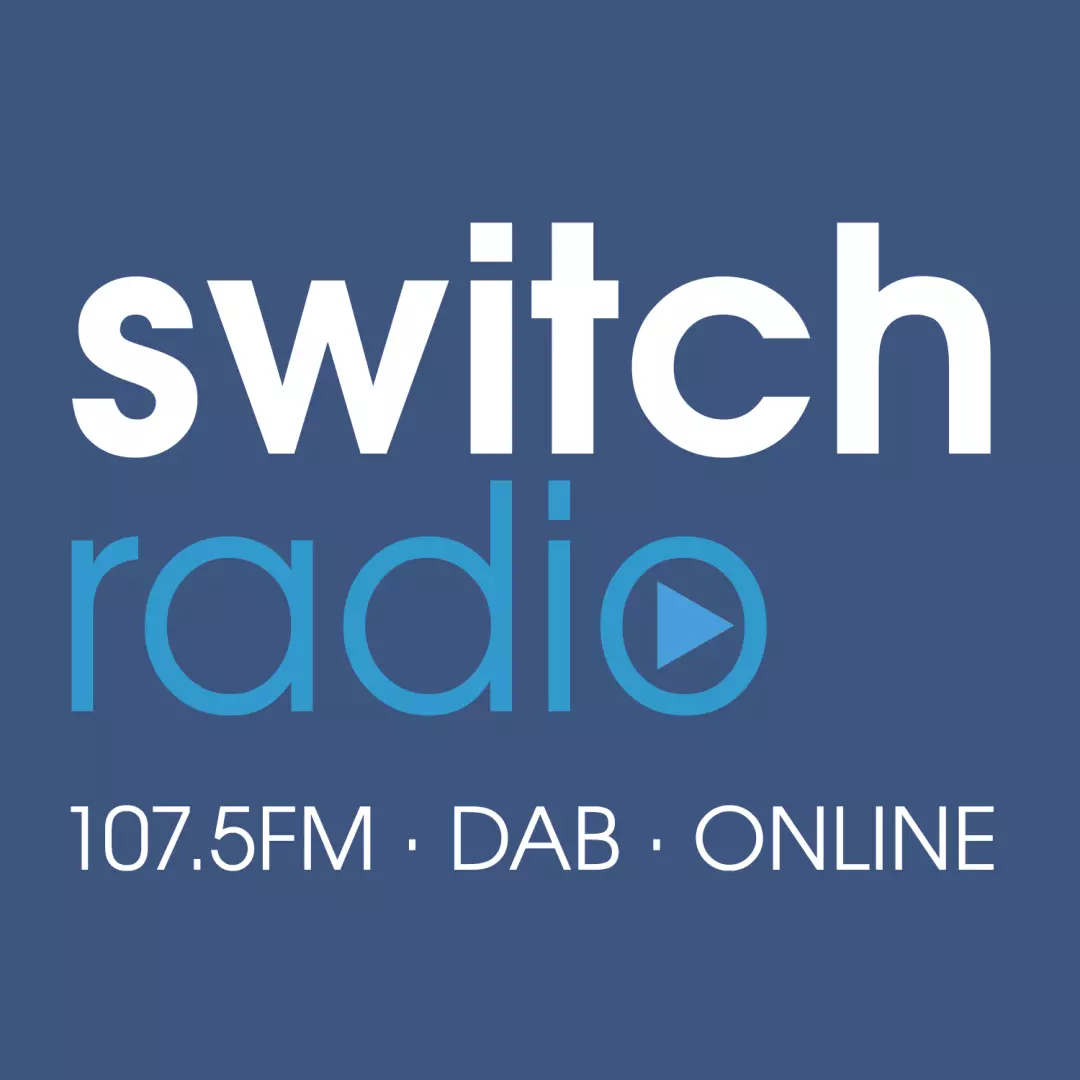
- England
- Broadcast area: Black Country, North and South Birmingham; Worldwide: Internet radio
- Frequencies: FM: 107.5 MHz; DAB: 8A/9A/9C - Birmingham; RDS: Name: Switch Radio
- Branding: Switch

Programming
- Language: English
- Format: Contemporary hit radio, news, Arts and Culture, speech, showbiz

History
- First air date: April 2010

Links
- Webcast: Web Stream
- Website: www.switchradio.co.uk

Switch Radio (also known as Switch Radio 107.5) is a British community radio station, broadcasting from North and South Birmingham, which transmits 24 hours a day on 107.5 FM, local DAB and via Internet radio.

== History ==
The station began life under its previous name, Vale FM, when it was formed by residents from the Castle Vale estate in north east Birmingham in 1995. Switch Radio launched in April 2010 and still broadcasts from Castle Vale.

== Coverage ==
The station's FM broadcast serves the Birmingham suburbs of Minworth, Castle Bromwich, Castle Vale, Bromford, Tyburn, Hurst Green, Walmley, Fox Hollies and Wylde Green. It also broadcasts to the Greater Birmingham area through the region's small-scale DAB multiplex. In addition, the station simulcasts on the internet through its own website and via apps like TuneIn.

== See also ==
- Community radio in the United Kingdom
- List of radio stations in the United Kingdom
