= Hub Radio =

- Bristol; England
- Broadcast area: University of the West of England Frenchay Campus
- Frequency: DAB

Ownership
- Owner: UWESU

Links
- Webcast: http://hubradio.co.uk/player/
- Website: http://www.hubradio.co.uk

Hub Radio is a student radio station that broadcasts from the University of the West of England (UWE) in Bristol. The station broadcasts locally to Frenchay Campus on DAB and online.

== History ==
Hub Radio has its roots from its original banner 'Fresh FM' back in 1994. This existed for 4 weeks at a time under an FM Restricted Service Licence.

In 1998, media students at UWE decided to revamp Fresh FM and rebranded the station as Radio Base. The station was relaunched again later in 2002 with an online stream, a five-year AM licence and moved into a space in The Rackhay. The station was renamed 'The Hub' to reflect the station's desire to be the centre of the UWE Community.

In 2005, the station had to move out of The Rackhay due to rental costs and moved into a temporary home in Bower Ashton. After a fall in participation, the station was relaunched once again in 2006 into the current format. On the brink of closure in 2007, students Rob Green and Alex Bright volunteered to take the station over from union staff. Online listenership was raised from 100 per week to over 5000 per week, and the station found space in a small store room in the UWESU Media Centre (nickname "The Huboard"). In years to follow, budgets were increased to cover promotion, new equipment and wages for main team members. The studio moved to the gallery position next to the student union's main bar in 2011, before relocating with the rest of the union to the new U block in 2015. In 2016, Hub introduced a fresh new logo (shown) and brand to coincide with the expanding areas that Hub cover, including events and video productions.

In April 2016 the station was included in a small scale DAB trial in the Bristol area that could be received in Central and South Bristol.

Small scale promotions have occurred since then, however most social media platforms for the radio have gone silent, especially since the Covid-19 pandemic in 2020, however the site is still up and running live on their website as of December 2024.

In December 2022, the Severnside small scale DAB multiplex launched, with Hub Radio as one of the services.

In February 2025, the station handed back its restricted service licence for the 1449 AM transmitter.

== Schedule ==
Hub Radio runs various segments throughout the day - from Sunday to Friday;

Monday

- 09:00–13:00 – Morning with A.M.Y
- 3:00–21:00 – Even Break
- 21:00–23:00 – JPMQ's

Tuesday

- 17:00–19:00 – SPUD FM
- 19:00–22:00 – Radio Silence
- 22:00–00:00 – Marco More

Wednesday

- 12:00–17:00 – Hub Radio's Your Show!
- 17:00–19:00 – Justin Time
- 19:00–21:00 – Ryan's Post-Rock Radio
- 21:00–00:00 – Big Beat Manifesto

Thursday

- 17:00–20:00 – The ASC Show
- 20:00–00:00 – Sounds of the Universe

Friday

- 11:00–19:00 – DSCVRY.fm
- 19:00–22:00 – Maciek vs BB Club
- 22:00–00:00 – Bowlcut's Selections

Saturday

- No scheduled programming

Sunday

- 18:00–20:00 – Instant Relief
- 20:00–21:00 – Blackout Bass
- 21:00–00:00 – Duality
