= Juice Radio =

- Logo used since January 2024
- Preston, Lancashire; England
- Broadcast area: Preston
- Frequency: FM: 103.2 MHz
- Branding: Juice Radio

Programming
- Language: English
- Format: Community radio Pop music

History
- First air date: October 6, 2008
- Former names: Preston FM; City Beat; Beat Radio; Beat 103

Technical information
- ERP: 25 watts

Links
- Website: www.juiceradio.co.uk

Juice Radio was a community radio station in Preston, Lancashire. The service originally launched in 2008 as Preston FM before rebranding in 2015 as City Beat, later becoming Beat 103 and finally, in January 2024 using the name Juice Radio.

The station disappeared from the DAB broadcasting spectrum and ended all live and presenter-led programming, switching to a continuous non-stop music service on FM. Its online streams were also discontinued.

== History ==
Logo as Preston FM

=== Preston FM ===
Preston FM was initially operated by Prescap (Preston Community Arts Project), a local arts charity. It originally broadcast six Restricted Service Licence trials over three years from October 2005 to June 2008 and subsequently received a full-time community radio licence from Ofcom. The station was partly backed by EU funding. It broadcast a wide range of music and speech programming by local presenters and arts practitioners. Speech programming included the serialisation of a novel by a local writer.

In April 2012, the Prescap charity closed due to the loss of its Arts Council England funding. Preston FM was spun out into its own independent company to allow it to continue broadcasting, and moved out of Prescap's building into its own studios on Cannon Street.

In early January 2015, the station unexpectedly went off the air. It resumed broadcasting a few days later, but was unable to sustain itself long-term and Preston FM ceased broadcasting in 2015.

=== City Beat ===
Following the closure of Preston FM, the station relaunched with a more mainstream commercial music format under the name City Beat 103.2, with new premises at Preston Guild Hall. In June 2017, the station was found in breach of its Ofcom licence after transphobic comments were made by the presenter of the Bigger Drive Home programme.

=== Beat 103 ===
In 2018, the station relaunched once again as Beat Radio and subsequently Beat 103, reflecting its FM frequency. In late 2019, the station once more fell off air following a number of problems, including the deletion of music and audio from the station's computers.

In May 2020, Beat 103 was again found in breach of its Ofcom licence. The regulator's investigation found that the station had not adhered to its Key Commitments on a number of levels, including the absence of any news, sport or speech programming, and a lack of older music tracks.

=== Juice Radio ===
In January 2024, the station again rebranded as Juice Radio, merging its operations with a commercial DAB digital radio station already on the air in North West England.

In July 2024, Ofcom once again found the radio station to be in breach of its licensed Key Commitments for the fourth time.

=== Apparent Closure ===
From October 2025, the station disappeard from the DAB brodasting specturm and ended all live / presenter-led programming and switched to a continuous non-stop music service on the FM broadcast. Shortly afterwards, it was removed from the UK Radioplayer portal and its online web streams were discontinued.

== Transmission ==
Beat 103 transmits on 103.2 MHz with an ERP of 25 watts from Guild Tower in Preston city centre.
