= Dune Radio =

Coordinates: 53°38′54″N 3°00′23″W

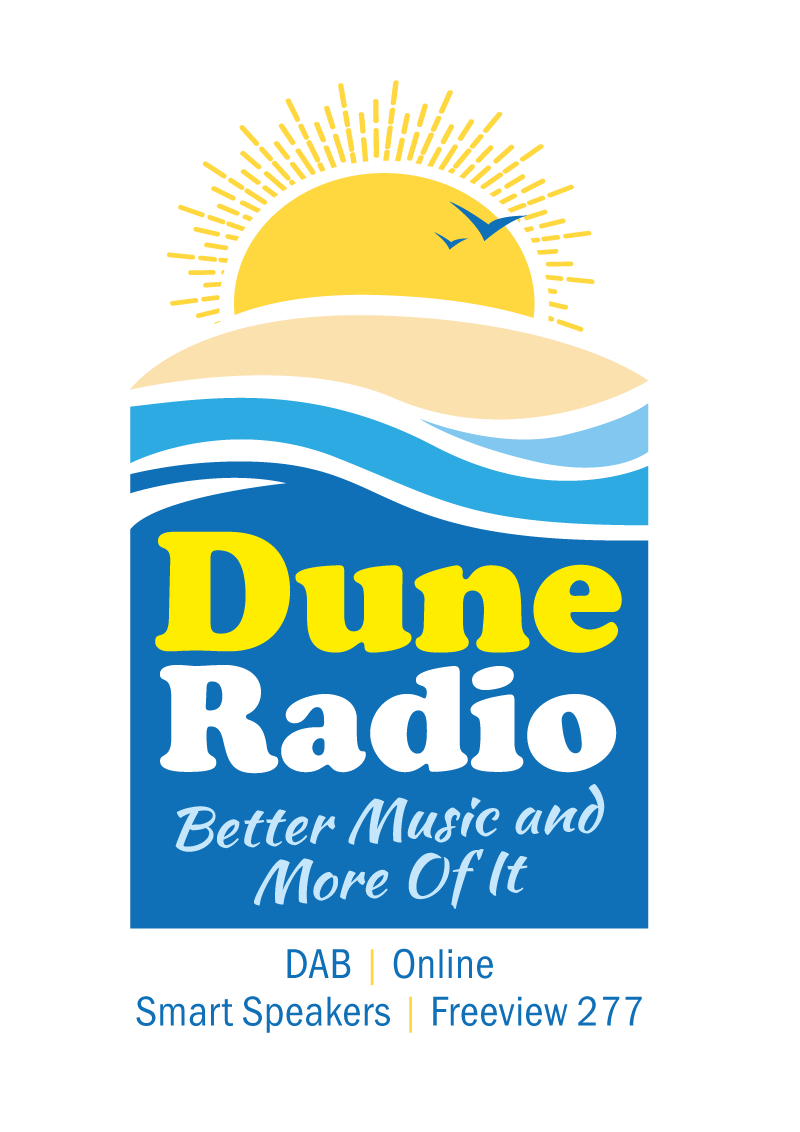
- England
- Broadcast area: Liverpool; The Wirral; Southport; Blackpool
- Frequency: DAB: Channels 7D 8B 9A

Programming
- Format: CHR/Pop

Ownership
- Owner: Diamond Media Broadcasting Ltd

History
- First air date: 2016
- Former names: Sandgrounder Radio

Technical information

Links
- Webcast: Yes
- Website: Dune Radio

Dune Radio (formerly Sandgrounder Radio) is an Independent Local Radio station for Liverpool, The Wirral, Southport, Blackpool and the North West Coast of England.

The station broadcasts on DAB Digital Radio and Online (website/App/Smart Speakers) as well as on Freeview Channel 277 across the Granada region.

== History ==
The station started life as a 28-day RSL (Restricted Service Licence) covering Southport on FM in November 2015.

In June 2016, the station launched full time on DAB Digital Radio covering Southport and The Liverpool City Region.

In the summer of 2020, broadcasting regulator Ofcom granted permission for the station to extend its editorial coverage to the Fylde Coast taking in Lytham St Annes and Blackpool covering the North West Coast of England.
