= Fun Kids =

British children's radio station

- London; England
- Broadcast area: United Kingdom
- Frequency: DAB: 9A London

Programming
- Format: Children's Radio

Ownership
- Owner: Children's Radio UK Ltd

History
- First air date: May 2005

Links
- Webcast: Radioplayer
- Website: www.funkidslive.com

Fun Kids is a national children's and pop digital radio station in the United Kingdom with associated websites, YouTube and podcast channels. It has previously been the winner of the Sony and Arqiva Digital Radio Stations of the year. It is operated by Children's Radio UK Ltd. It previously broadcast on DAB Digital Radio across the UK but now is available in selected cities on DAB. It remains nationally available online, through smart speakers and on mobile apps.

== Background ==
Fun Kids (formerly Fun Radio) was created by the now-defunct GCap Media, Hit Entertainment and the children's radio campaigner Susan Stranks. It went on-air in May 2005 and then was acquired in September 2008 by Folder Media.

Fun Radio was initially launched on DAB digital radio in London and some areas of the South East alongside being broadcast on digital television. In January 2008, the line ups of a number of local digital multiplexes changed, with Fun Radio being removed as a service from those outside London.

== Broadcasting Nationwide ==
In the summer of 2009, Fun Kids launched temporarily on the national Digital One multiplex from 27 June until 3 October. Fun Kids was removed from Virgin Media channel 926 on 1 December 2009 and also from Sky channel 0171 on 16 December 2009.

In February 2016 it was announced that the station would start broadcasting nationwide by joining Sound Digital's national DAB digital radio multiplex. It launched, alongside the multiplex's other radio stations on 29 February. On 1 September 2023, the Radio Today website reported that Fun Kids would be leaving the national Sound Digital multiplex after seven years, and instead join a series of local multiplexes.

== Presenters ==
Fun Kids has been a training ground for many young radio presenters including James Barr, Tim Dixon, James Beckingham, Frankie Vu, Matt Kot, Luke Franks, Anna Louise Claydon and Sean Thorne.

Its current presenter line-up includes: George Butler, Dan Simpson, Bex Lindsay, Conor Knight, Emma-Louise Amanshia and Georgia Kain.

== Fun Kids Junior ==
On 22 July 2019, Fun Kids launched Fun Kids Junior, its sister radio station for preschool children and parents. The station plays songs for preschool children to sing and dance to during the day and bedtime stories and lullabies during the evening and overnight.

Fun Kids Junior is currently available on DAB+ Digital Radio in London, South East, Liverpool and Cheshire. It also broadcasts on the Fun Kids website, on the Fun Kids app and on smart speakers, for example, saying "Alexa, play Fun Kids Junior!" turns on the station.

== Other stations ==
In January 2021, Fun Kids launched eight new stations – Fun Kids Animals, Fun Kids Classics, Fun Kids Classical, Fun Kids Party, Fun Kids Pop Hits, Fun Kids Naps, Fun Kids Silly and Fun Kids Soundtracks. Its classical music station, Fun Kids Classical, has concert pianist Lang Lang as its ambassador.
