= Angel Radio =

- Portsmouth; United Kingdom
- Broadcast area: Portsmouth & Havant
- Frequencies: FM: 94.8MHz Chichester 98.6MHz Portsmouth & Havant DAB: 11C South Hampshire 11B Bournemouth 10C Surrey & South London 11C Kent 8A Salisbury
- RDS: _ANGEL__

Programming
- Language: English
- Format: Community radio

Ownership
- Owner: Angel Radio Ltd

History
- First air date: February 1999 (1993 as a pirate)
- Former frequencies: FM: 101.1MHz Havant, 89.3MHz Portsmouth & Havant (105.2MHz as a pirate)

Technical information
- Licensing authority: Ofcom

Links
- Webcast: www.angelradio.co.uk/internet
- Website: www.angelradio.co.uk

Angel Radio is a community radio station based in Havant, Hampshire, England, aimed at older people. It broadcasts from a transmitter at Fort Widley on 98.6FM and another in Chichester on 94.8FM, as well as on DAB Digital Radio and online.

== Origins ==
Angel Radio was originally an unlicensed 'pirate' radio station, having conducted a number of broadcasts between 1993 and 1999.

In 1999, the group obtained their first legal broadcast licences which allowed temporary broadcasts to Havant, Portsmouth, the Isle of Wight and Brixton using low powered FM transmitters.

== Full-time broadcasts ==
In 2002, Angel Radio commenced full-time broadcasts as part of the Radio Authority's Access Radio trial. Originally broadcasting on 101.1FM from a site in a residential area within Havant, the trial licence was originally for 12 months, but was subsequently extended to four years. In 2005, Angel Radio was awarded one of the first community radio licenses, and in 2006 became the second fully licensed Ofcom community radio station. At this time, broadcasts were from a relocated transmitter in an industrial estate within Havant.

== Expansion ==
Angel Radio became one of the first community radio stations to broadcast on DAB digital radio, launching on the NOW South Hampshire DAB multiplex in 2010, with coverage subsequently added on the Dorset, Surrey & South London and Kent DAB multiplexes, in addition to a number of small-scale DAB multiplexes.

In 2017, Angel Radio extended its broadcasts beyond Havant with a relocated transmitter at Fort Purbrook in Portsmouth and a new frequency of 89.3FM. Coverage expanded again after relocation to the Fort Widley transmitter – sharing the mast and aerial used by Heart – to improve coverage on FM in Portsmouth and Havant. In September 2024 a second FM transmitter was added in Chichester on 94.8FM.

== Format ==
Angel Radio broadcasts music and information of interest to older people. Initially with a format of music from the 1920s to 1950s, this has expanded to music from 1900 to 1969. Programmes are presented by older people. Some programmes carry a theme, which encourages listeners to think of songs on that topic or guess the theme of the show. Other programmes provide mental stimulation through quizzes, word games and memory-jogging conversation.

== Awards ==
In 2009 Angel Radio was awarded a Queen's Award for Voluntary Service.

== See also ==
- Angel Radio Isle of Wight
