= LDC Radio =

Radio station in Leeds, Yorkshire, England

- Leeds; England
- Frequencies: FM: 97.8 MHz; DAB: 9A (Leeds), 8B (Bradford)
- RDS: LDCRadio

Programming
- Language: English
- Format: Dance music

History
- First air date: 17 June 2020

Technical information
- ERP: 100 watts
- Transmitter coordinates: 53.7974°N 1.5916°W

Links
- Website: ldcradio.co.uk

LDC Radio is a community radio station based in the city of Leeds, West Yorkshire, with a dance and urban music format. Its studios are based in Leeds city centre. Its name is an abbreviation of Leeds Dance Community Radio.

== History ==
LDC Radio was launched in June 2020 in collaboration with Leeds Beckett University in the Headingley area of the city. In August 2022 the station moved studios from Leeds Beckett University to new studios in Leeds City Centre, thus severing ties with the University.

In late 2022, LDC Radio began broadcasting on DAB in Leeds and Bradford.

== Programming ==
LDC Radio's programming consists largely of dance and urban music, with a mix of genres provided in daytime and specialist programming during the evening and weekend hours. The station also syndicates well known radio shows from big name DJs overnights on weekends. Discussions of local issues, particularly those affecting young people, also feature on the station and it works with local young people to promote volunteering opportunities.

Notable presenters on LDC Radio include Hard Dance DJ Amber D, former Radio Aire & Minster FM presenter Carl Kingston, former Ridings FM presenters Wes & Leanne who host the breakfast show and YouTube personality Danny Malin.

The station's Key Commitments require it to play "House, Hardcore, UK garage, Jungle, Drum & Bass, Grime, Dubstep, Reggae, Ragga, Soul, Hip Hop, R&B and unreleased music from local artists" with speech content consisting of "shout-outs, dedications, news bulletins and local information".

== Transmission ==
LDC Radio transmits with 100 watts ERP (50 watts vertical and 50 watts horizontal polarisation) on 97.8 MHz. Its transmitter site is located on a residential tower block in the Armley area of the city. Coverage extends to most of the urban area of Leeds.

In May 2021, the station was awarded a licence to broadcast on DAB digital radio as part of Leeds Digital Media, a consortium of local radio stations. In August 2022 LDC radio began broadcasting on DAB in Bradford on the Bradford Digital Media multiplex and in November 2022 began broadcasting on DAB in Leeds on the Leeds Digital Media multiplex.
