= Solar Radio =

Radio station in London

- England
- Broadcast area: London
- Frequencies: 9A (London DAB), 9C (Norwich DAB)

Programming
- Format: Soul, jazz-funk, house

History
- First air date: 4 November 1984 (Pirate); 1 June 1999 (Satellite); 29 October 2015; 10 years ago (London DAB)

Links
- Website: www.solarradio.com

Solar Radio is a London-based radio station, which originally started life as a pirate radio station. Solar broadcasts primarily soul to London on DAB and online.

Solar (originally short for Sound of Londons Alternative Radio) first broadcast as a pirate radio station in October 1984, and was founded by DJ Tony Monson, who later joined Kiss FM. Solar ceased broadcasting in October 1988 as an unlicensed operator.

On 1 June 1999, Solar returned through satellite broadcasting, initially broadcasting on Astra 19.2°E, and then Astra 2 (used by Sky TV) from 9 August 2000 where they stayed until 31 May 2019. From 29 October 2015, Solar also commenced broadcasting on the Trial London DAB MUX.

Presenters on Solar include Tony Monson, Clive Richardson (from the original 1984 roster), Marc Collins, Gary Spence, Steve Hobbs, Mike Gee, Lisa I'Anson, Ralph Tee, Ian Jons, John Osborne, Louie Martin, Kid Batchelor, Les Adams and Steve Johns, Paul Phillips, Russ Warnes. Robbie Vincent has occasionally guested on the station
