= Radio XL =

- Birmingham; England
- Broadcast area: West Midlands
- Frequency: DAB: 9A (Worcestershire) 11B (Wolverhampton) and (Shropshire) AM: 1296 kHz (Birmingham)

Programming
- Format: Asian music, news and entertainment

Ownership
- Owner: Arun Bajaj

History
- First air date: 30 May 1995

Links
- Website: www.radioxl.net

Radio XL is an Asian radio station broadcasting to the West Midlands from Birmingham, England.

Radio XL reach is to a potential Asian audience of over 250,000 people in the 15+ age group. The station is available throughout the West Midlands on 1296 AM, DAB in Wolverhampton and Shropshire and online.

The studios are at KMS House on Bradford Street near Birmingham City Centre, from where Radio XL broadcasts live.

Radio XL is aimed primarily, but not exclusively, at the Asian community. Programmes are designed to reach all sections of the community by using Hindi and English languages. Other specialist programmes are broadcast in Urdu, Gujarati, Punjabi and Bengali.

Radio XL is involved with charity events, and accepts advertising.

Their strapline used to be "Night and day, the Asian way".
