= Westside Radio =

Community radio station based in Hanwell, Greater London

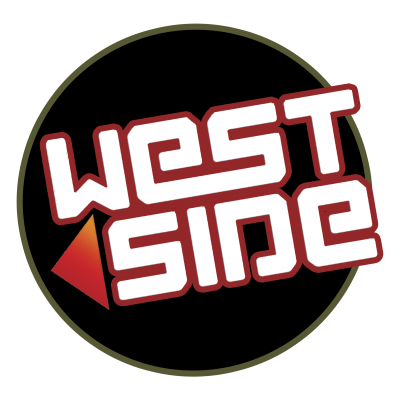
- London; England
- Frequencies: FM: 89.6 MHz (West London); DAB: 8B (West London SSDAB), 9A (South London SSDAB)
- RDS: WESTSIDE

Programming
- Format: Hip hop; R&B; grime

Ownership
- Owner: Sone Palda, Amar Chadha

History
- First air date: 13 September 2007

Technical information
- Transmitter coordinates: 51°31′08″N 0°21′50″W

Links
- Website: thisiswestside.com

Westside Radio (formerly Westside 89.6 FM) and stylised WESTSIDE, is a community radio station based in Hanwell, London. Westside broadcasts locally on 89.6 FM, to wider London on DAB, and online. The station specialises in hip hop, R&B, grime, and urban music.

== History ==
Westside launched on 13 September 2007 after being awarded a community radio licence from Ofcom to serve the community of Ealing from its base in Southall. The station was officially opened by Boris Johnson, then a candidate for Mayor of London, who attended the launch event and cut the ribbon at the station’s West London studios.

Westside is recognised as a platform for developing talent. Over nearly two decades, the station has launched the careers of numerous presenters, DJs, and producers who have progressed onto major UK broadcasting stations, digital media, and other creative industries.

On 17 November 2025, Westside launched on DAB on the City West Digital (West London) and South of the River Digital Radio (South London) multiplexes.

== Notable past presenters ==
- Rickie Haywood Williams at Kiss (UK radio station)
- Pandora Christie at Heart Radio (former 95.8 Capital FM and Kiss)
- Alex Mansuroglu at Kiss
- Andrea Zara at Kiss (UK radio station)
- Annaliese Dayes at Heart (radio network)
- Charlie Tisma at Kiss (Winner of The KISS Chosen One 2013) at Kiss (UK radio station)
- Bobby Friction at BBC Radio 1, BBC Asian Network
- Neev Spencer at Kiss
- Jasmine Takhar at BBC Asian Network
- Seema Jaswal at Premier League Worldwide, BDO World Darts Championship
- Mark Strippel at BBC Asian Network (former BBC Radio 1Xtra)
- Eve Jaso at Channel 4 FM
- Raj and Pablo at BBC Asian Network
- Amy Solomon ITV (TV network) LBC
- Georgia LA at Beats 1 (former SBTV, BBC Radio 1Xtra, Vevo)
- Goubran Bahou at Goubtube, UniLad (former Wall Of Comedy)
- Claira Hermet former BBC Radio 1Xtra, GRM Daily, BT Sport
- Murtz former BBC Asian Network
- Panjabi Hit Squad at BBC Asian Network
- Remel London at BBC Radio 1Xtra, Sky Television
- Ameet Chana former at BBC Asian Network
- Graham 'The Captain' Kirk at (Redstone FM DAB Surrey/SW London)
- Reya El-Salahi at London Live (Former BBC Radio Nottingham)
- Carla Battisti (UBC Entertainment Editor)
- Vallisa Chauhan at Sunrise Radio (former Buzz Asia)
- Amit Sodha at Sunrise Radio
- Sunny Hundal at BBC Television, Sky Television
- Lewis Davies former Fire Radio and Pontin's Bluecoat
- Adam Turner former DJ at Jemm 1
- Hannah Burns (former TV Presenter and current voice-over artist)
- Rebecca Judd at Apple Music 1
