= Phonic FM =

England
- Broadcast area: Exeter
- Frequency: 106.8 FM

Programming
- Language: English
- Format: Community radio

Ownership
- Owner: Phonic FM

History
- First air date: 2008

Links
- Website: www.phonic.fm

Phonic FM is a community radio station in Exeter, Devon, England. The station was set up in 2008 and started broadcasting on 15 February 2008. Phonic FM was originally called Vibraphonic FM and broadcast as part of a one-month Music Festival in the City of Exeter called The Vibraphonic Music Festival.

Initially the station was broadcasting using a Restricted Service Licence. This meant the station could only broadcast for one month a year during the festival, but in 2008 Phonic FM gained a five-year full-time broadcasting licence.

Shows include The Edge of Jazz, The Future Sound of Exeter Show, Anti Telly Time, Planet Fear, The Morgan Collins Show, Revolutionary Radio Request Show, The Sunday Scribble, Ja-Fu-Re, A Head of the Curve and a host of other shows to be found at the website www.phonic.fm. The station pursues a No Playlists' and 'No Adverts' policy, and plays a wide range of other music including, funk, soul, hip hop, blues, rock and alternative. It also has a classical music programme and an arts review programme. From early 2009, it has had the capacity to record live, in addition to "as live" sessions from local musicians and bands in the adjacent Sound Gallery Studios.

In the June 2008 Radio World International Edition (Volume 36 #2) the station was described thus, "There is nothing quite like it on the U.K. dial. It is the perfect antidote for complaints about high rotation playlists, or that all stations these days sound much the same. This one certainly does not. Phonic.fm is a genuinely refreshing, genuine alternative, from which the best is yet to come."

In 2009, the station was reviewed by the Times Online website. Writer Christian Brook said:

Trying to find a decent alternative music radio station in the UK has always proved tricky ... Now, however, a community radio station called Phonic in Exeter, Devon, is ticking all the right boxes and is providing some of the most inspiring broadcasting in the country.

Billed as Exeter’s "sound alternative" Phonic is mainly self-funded but has had grants from local councils, manned by volunteer staff, and has a remit to promote the culture of the city ... you always know some unexpected musical delight is not far away ... there is nothing quite like it in the UK.

It's almost an alternative alternative station; it's not run of the mill singles and famous tracks that you'll hear (though there are a smattering of them) it's the obscure, seldom played album and session tracks that get an airing.

In November 2012, the regulator, OFCOM, offered a five-year extension to the licence which was re-newed in 2018. In April 2015, as a result of changes in the law, Phonic.FM, together with 18 other stations previously denied access to either advertising or sponsorship, had their promises of performance altered to allow them to accept either, up to a centrally controlled limit. The Directors of Phonic.FM took the decision not to accept paid-for advertising, and consider their position on the question of sponsorship.

In 2020 the station joined with 5 other partners to apply for the Exeter SSDAB+ (Small scale DAB) licence In 2021 it announced that the bid had been successful.In January 2023 it started broadcasting to the Greater Exeter area on DAB+ [Block 9a] whilst continuing its output on FM. At the same time it joined with other partners to apply for the Plymouth area DAB+ service which came on-air during 2024. Subsequently it has signed a reciprocal deal with the DAB+ service for Torbay. During 2025 it applied for, and was awarded an extension of the DAB service into the East Devon area. During 2025 the Board of Phonic FM negotiated a change of promise of performance with regulator Ofcom, which relaxed rules relating to output hours and content.
