= Digital radio in the United Kingdom =

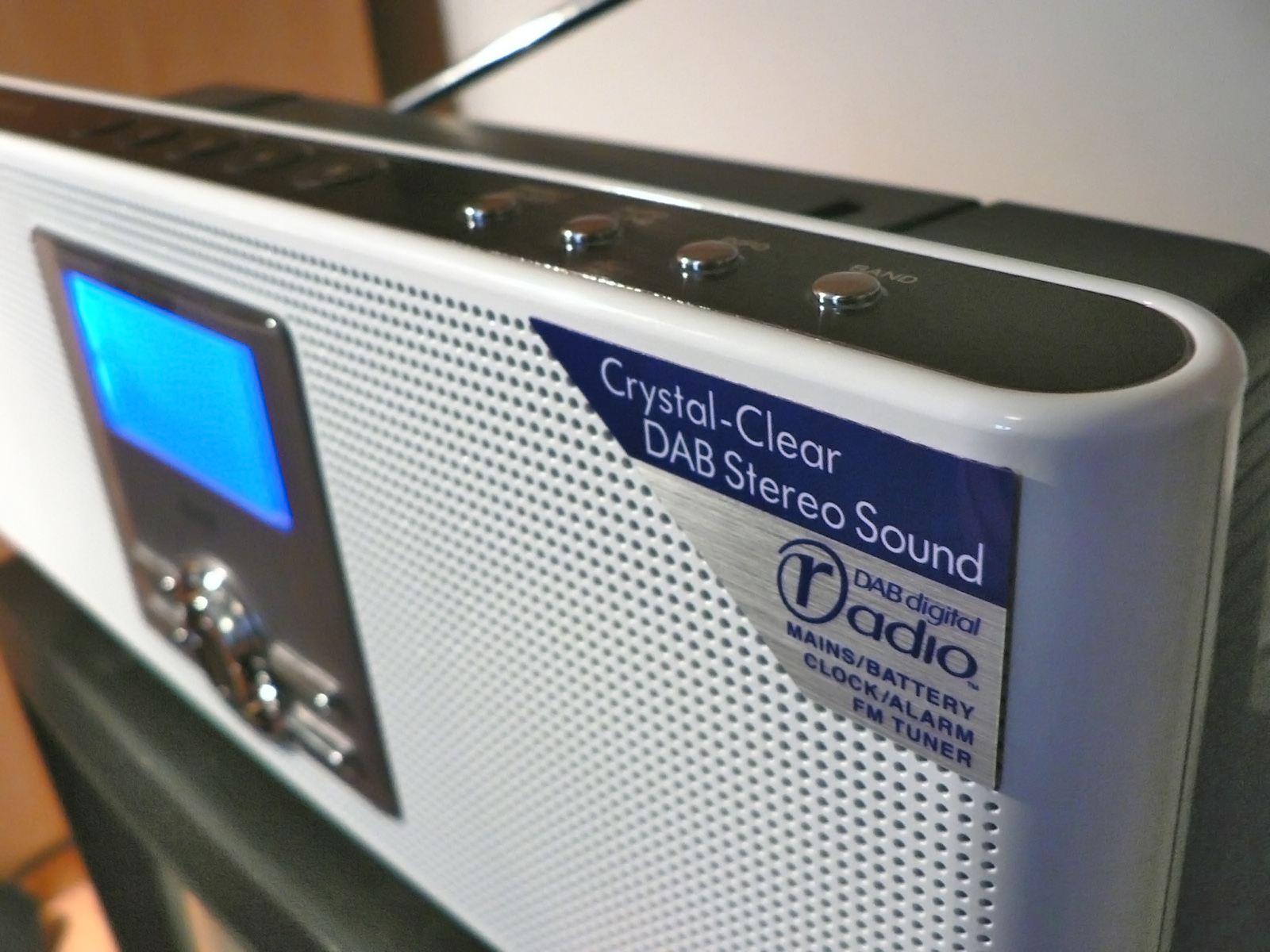
A typical DAB digital radio receiver with the Digital Radio Development Bureau DAB digital radio marketing logo

In the United Kingdom, the roll-out of digital radio has been proceeding since engineering test transmissions were started by the BBC in 1990 followed by a public launch in September 1995. The UK currently has one of the world's biggest digital radio networks, with about 500 transmitters, three national DAB ensembles, one regional DAB ensemble, 48 local DAB ensembles and an increasing number of small-scale DAB ensembles broadcasting over 250 commercial and 34 BBC radio stations across the UK. In London there are already more than 100 different digital stations available. In addition to DAB and DAB+, radio stations are also broadcast on digital television platform as well as internet radio in the UK. Digital radio ensemble operators and stations need a broadcasting licence from the UK's media regulator Ofcom to broadcast.

In the long term there will be a switchover from analogue to digital radio when the AM and FM services will cease. The government has set criteria on the coverage and proportion of digital listening before this occurs. In 2018 the criteria of over 50% of digital radio listening was met which will now require the UK Government to review digital radio in view of a potential switchover. In the same year, the BBC stated it would keep some FM radio for the foreseeable future.

Digital radio in the United Kingdom is being promoted by radio stations and the broadcasting industry on the premise that it provides superior quality sound over AM, a wider choice of radio stations, is easier to use, and is resistant to the interference which other broadcast media are susceptible to. On the other hand, critics say that coverage is not yet sufficient and the quality can be less than that of FM.

In the UK, 65.8% of all radio listening hours by the third quarter of 2021 were through digital platforms, with DAB making up the majority of digital radio listening (65.3% of digital radio listening). In the first quarter of 2020, 66.7% of UK people aged 15+ claimed to have access to a DAB radio set at home.

== Digital Audio Broadcasting ==
Experimental transmissions of the DAB Eureka 147 standard from the Crystal Palace transmitting station by the BBC started in 1990 with permanent transmissions covering London in September 1995. With the expansion of its single-frequency network in the spring of 1998, the BBC national ensemble was available to 65% of the UK population by 2001, 85% by 2004 and 96.4% by 2015. DAB+ full-time broadcasts began in 2016.

The Broadcasting Act of 1996 allowed the introduction of national, regional and local commercial ensembles in the United Kingdom.

The first national ensemble licence for DAB from the Radio Authority was advertised in 1998 and one applicant applied for the licence. The licence was awarded to the GWR Group and NTL Broadcast, who since the launch were renamed Arqiva. The two companies formed the Digital One ensemble, which began broadcasting on 15 November 1999. The Digital One ensemble has grown and is currently available to over 90% of the UK population although an Ofcom report into Digital Radio in 2015 puts robust household coverage at 89.8% of the UK.

=== Growth and benefits of DAB in the UK ===
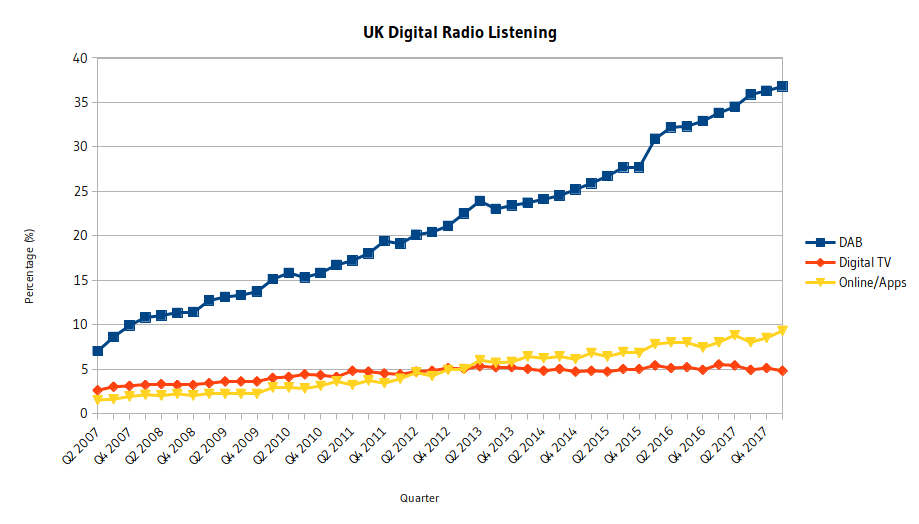
Chart showing the listening share of the United Kingdom's digital radio platforms – DAB(+), digital TV and online through a device or smartphone/tablet app

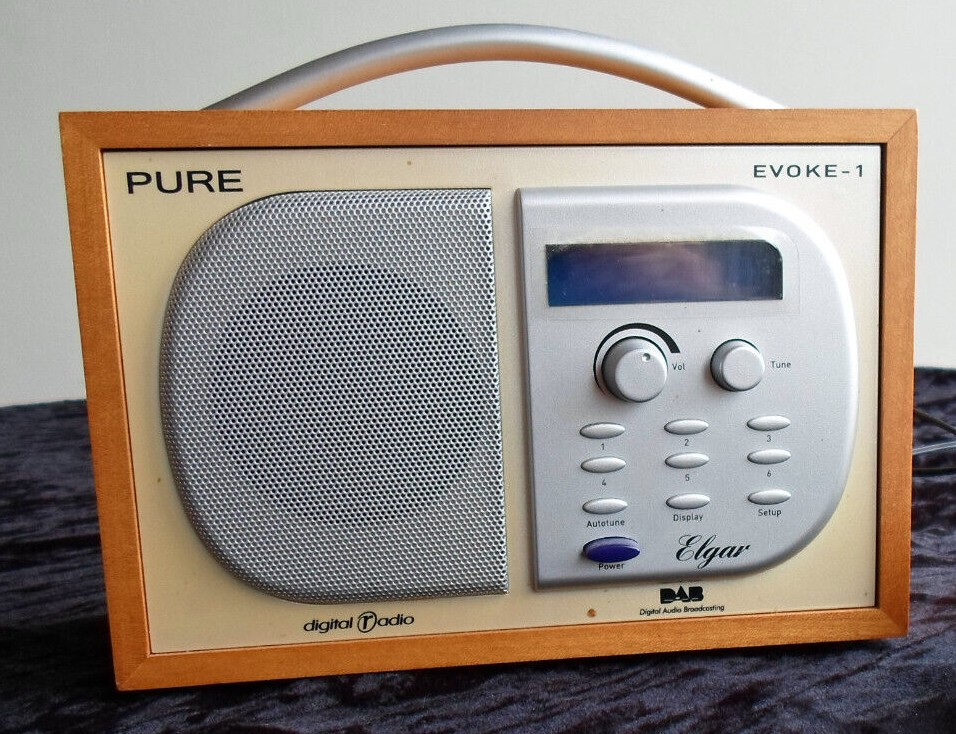
The Pure Evoke-1 from 2002 spawned the growth of DAB among consumers

In the United Kingdom, the uptake of DAB has increased since the launch of the BBC national DAB ensemble in 1995. Lower prices, new radio stations and marketing have increased the uptake of DAB radio in the UK. Digital radios were first sold as car radios in 1997, priced around £800, with hi-fi tuners costing up to £2,000 being released two years later. In 2001, Digital One invested in Frontier Silicon to produce a new processing chip which would allow cheaper portable radios to be produced. Roberts Radio, Goodmans and in 2002, Pure Digital's award-winning Evoke series of radios broke the £100 price barrier, and DAB take up has increased since.

The BBC and other DAB broadcasters have been encouraging DAB take up by promoting a number of features which are either new or improve upon former technology in their sales literature. The benefit of DAB is that due to the use of multiplexing technology and encoding technology, broadcasters including the BBC and EMAP have been able to launch exclusive digital radio stations alongside their existing analogue radio stations. Broadcasters also state that DAB offers better reception, without the problems of interference that are more noticeable through analogue radio. DAB radios also come with features such as station lists, so listeners do not need to retune their receivers, as well as scrolling text, providing information such as breaking news, travel information or the latest track information.

DAB has also been marketed as having two major advantages over analogue radio broadcasting in that using MPEG-1 Audio Layer II lossy audio compression technology and more recently DAB+ using High-Efficiency Advanced Audio Coding, parts of the audio spectrum that cannot be heard by humans are discarded, meaning less data needs to be sent over the air. This, as well as multiplexing technology, allows a number of channels to be broadcast together on one frequency as opposed to one channel for analogue radio broadcasts.

National, local and regional DAB ensembles use the same frequency for the area they cover. Using a single-frequency network, an ensemble broadcasting a number of stations can cover the same area as a number of VHF frequencies which would be required to cover the same area for one station. The BBC carried out successful tests of a single-frequency network in London before launching its national DAB ensemble.

=== Criticism of DAB Multiplex Operators ===
DAB audibly, in some cases, provides worse audio quality than FM by using very low bitrates. In 2020, most commercial stations use only 32–64 kbps (DAB+ with HE-AAC codec) while those stations maintaining the old DAB standard (MP2) have switched to mono with 64–80 kbps. A bit rate of 256 kbps (MP2) has been judged to provide a high quality stereo broadcast signal. The bit rates used by the radio stations on cable and satellite are usually higher. Many internet radio streams also use low bitrates but with MP3 rather than MP2 – providing better audio quality at the same reduced bandwidth (bit rate). On the other hand, an Ofcom survey, which was undertaken due to many consultation responses citing poor DAB quality, found that 94% of DAB listeners thought DAB was at least as good as FM.

In 2006, Ofcom estimated that even after extra spectrum has been allocated to DAB, around 90 local radio stations will be unable to transmit on DAB, either because there is no space for them on a local DAB multiplex, or because they cannot afford the high transmission costs of DAB that the multiplex operators are charging. Ofcom announced in 2005 that it regarded Digital Radio Mondiale (DRM) as an option for local stations unable to secure carriage or unable to pay the high transmission costs of DAB.

On 24 January 2009, Ofcom allowed electrical retailers to be granted a licence to rebroadcast DAB signals within their stores to demonstrate DAB radio sets. The United Kingdom consumer charity, Which? warned that consumers who could not get an adequate DAB signal could be misled by the in-store sets. The Digital Radio Development Bureau replied to the Which? report stating that stores contain a steel structure which produce a Faraday cage effect where DAB signals are blocked out. The DRDB recommended that consumers should check DAB coverage online with their postcode before purchasing a DAB radio to avoid disappointment.

On 24 November 2010, a number of commercial radio operators refused to run an advertisement promoting DAB, one operator stating that it would be "fundamentally immoral and dishonest" until DAB coverage matches that of FM. Commercial radio executives have argued that the BBC should pick up the majority of the cost of expanding the DAB network across the United Kingdom.

=== DAB+ ===
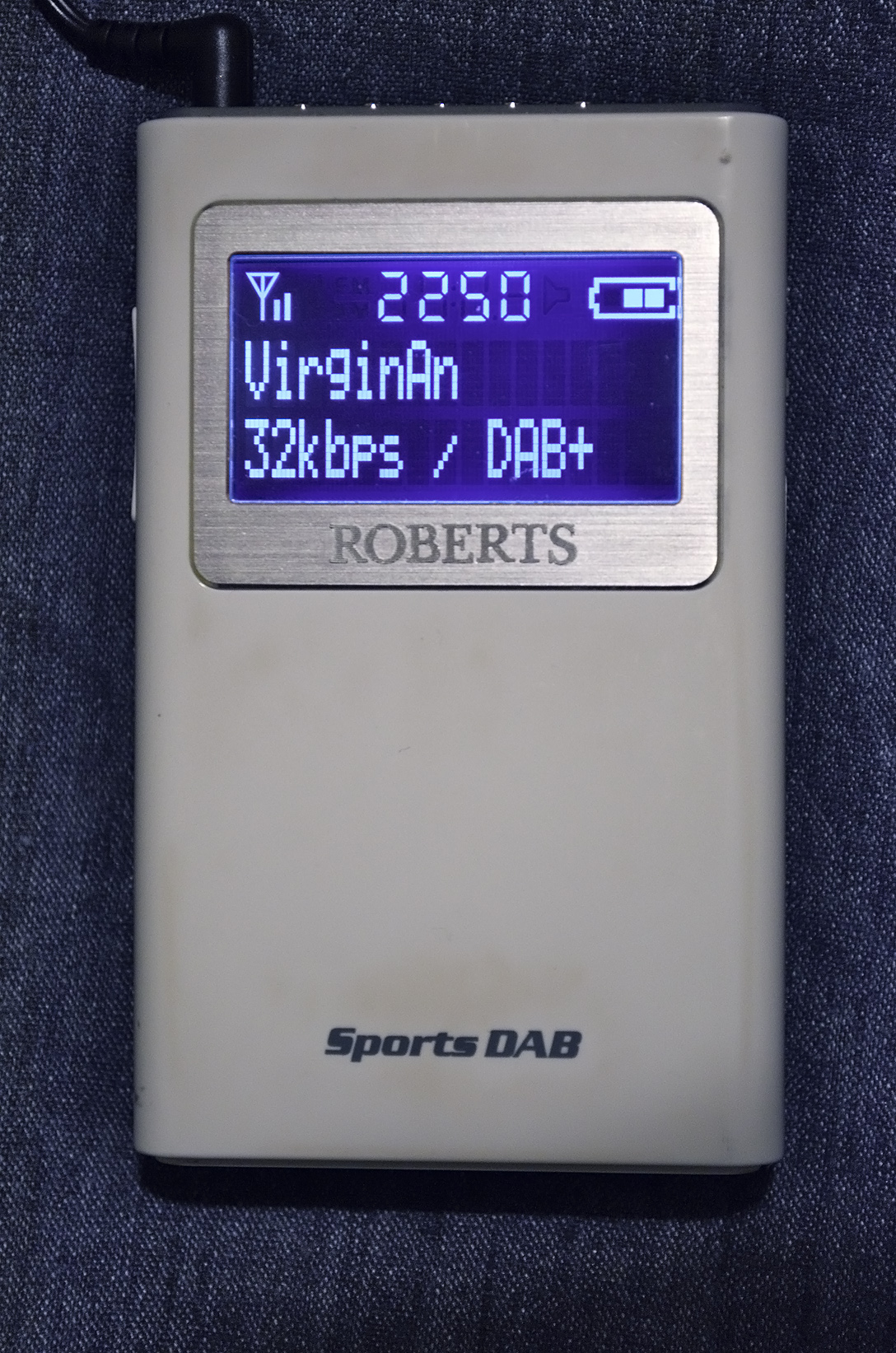
A DAB+ transmission of Virgin Radio Anthems on the Sound Digital multiplex in the UK, being received by a compatible radio

DAB+ is a major upgrade to DAB. It is not backwards compatible. The main difference is the use of the more efficient HE-AAC which doubles the number of stations up to about 20 in one bouquet. Most European countries quickly adopted DAB+ between 2015 and 2019. Only a small number of DAB-only receivers had been sold before which became worthless. In the UK, with the early success of DAB, the situation is different. In 2020, about half of the stations use DAB+, mostly new services, while the BBC and the big commercial stations continue to use the old DAB standard. DAB+ was first tested in the United Kingdom in 2013 before regular services were launched in 2016. The United Kingdom Government had previously ruled out any transition from DAB to DAB+ for the foreseeable future, a decision backed by the radio industry and the Department for Culture, Media and Sport. The chief executive of the DRDB, Tony Moretta, mirrored the calls by the radio industry and experts not to adopt DAB+ in the UK. In an interview with the TechRadar website in 2009, he claimed that DAB+ was a "red herring" and may not be introduced in the UK for the foreseeable future due to the growing number of digital radio sets currently being sold and used in the future which cannot decode and therefore access DAB+ stations. Independent radio analyst Grant Goddard also stated that there was an economic decision not to adopt DAB+ for both the industry and consumers.

Despite opposition aired to the government regarding the introduction of DAB+ in the United Kingdom by the industry and experts, Ofcom began testing DAB+ on the Brighton Experimental ensemble in January 2013 for a period of one month. In March 2014, the BBC announced that it would undertake a trial of DAB+ in the UK later in the year and on 1 September 2014, Folder Media began a four-month trial of DAB+ on the North East Wales and West Cheshire ensemble.

In early 2016, two new stations launched DAB+ services on the Portsmouth trial multiplex. Sound Digital, operators of one of the national multiplexes, launched three full-time broadcasting DAB+ services on 29 February 2016. Since then a number of stations have launched on DAB+ or switched from DAB to DAB+. As of September 2016, there were over 30 DAB+ stations being broadcast in the UK. In March 2017 the Brighton multiplex became the UK's first to only broadcast DAB+.

The Department for Culture, Media and Sport published minimum specifications for digital radio receivers in the UK in February 2013 which states that a receiver sold in the UK must be capable of decoding a DAB+ stream of up to 144 capacity units. (Note: Capacity units refer to a measure of a streams bitrate in addition to error correction added to the aforementioned stream. Capacity units are used to accurately determine the total capacity of a DAB ensemble.) Radios must support DAB+ to receive the digital tick mark. However this is not mandatory and many retailers continue to sell DAB receivers that do not support DAB+.

=== DAB frequency plan ===
DAB radio stations in the United Kingdom are broadcast on a number of frequency blocks on VHF Band III. The original plan devised in Wiesbaden for the framework of DAB in Europe was to allocate frequency blocks 11B to 12D for UK DAB broadcasting. However, as part of its Review of Radio, Ofcom has expanded the frequency allocations for DAB and has advertised local and a national ensemble licence on blocks outside the original Wiesbaden plan on 10B to 10D and 11A. Block 5A has also been reserved for the launch of local ensembles. In 2015, additional blocks were opened up for small scale DAB trials for an initial period of nine months. Ofcom reiterated the use of a number of frequency blocks between 7D and 9C for any future roll-out of small scale DAB multiplexes in its final report regarding the small scale DAB multiplexes published in September 2016. The first permanent Small Scale DAB licensed were advertised during 2021 with the trial licenses being awarded to the trial licensees.

==== VHF Band III ====
===== United Kingdom =====
VHF Band III sub-band	Block	Frequency	England	Wales	Scotland	Northern Ireland
1	5A	174.928 MHz	Local ensembles (not currently in use)	None	None	None
2	7D	194.064 MHz	Small scale DAB	Small scale DAB	Small scale DAB	Small scale DAB
2	8A	195.936 MHz	Small scale DAB	Small scale DAB	Small scale DAB	Small scale DAB
2	8B	197.648 MHz	Small scale DAB	Small scale DAB	Small scale DAB	Small scale DAB
2	9A	202.928 MHz	Small scale DAB	Small scale DAB	Small scale DAB	Small scale DAB
2	9B	204.640 MHz	Small scale DAB	Small scale DAB	Small scale DAB	Small scale DAB
2	9C	206.352 MHz	Small scale DAB	Small scale DAB	Small scale DAB	Small scale DAB
3	10B	211.648 MHz	Local ensembles; small scale DAB	Small scale DAB	Small scale DAB	Small scale DAB
3	10C	213.360 MHz	Local ensembles	None	None	None
3	10D	215.072 MHz	Local ensembles; small scale DAB	Local ensembles; small scale DAB	None	None
3	11A	216.928 MHz	Sound Digital ensemble	Sound Digital ensemble	Sound Digital ensemble	Sound Digital ensemble
3	11B	218.640 MHz	Local ensembles	None	Local ensembles	None
3	11C	220.352 MHz	Local ensembles; small scale DAB	None	Local ensembles	Small scale DAB
3	11D	222.064 MHz	Digital One ensemble	Digital One ensemble	Local and regional ensembles	Digital One ensemble
3	12A	223.936 MHz	Local ensembles (Note: Regional ensembles for the West Midlands closed on 27 August 2013. Yorkshire closed on 29 June 2015.)	Local ensembles (except West Wales)	Digital One ensemble	None
3	12B	225.648 MHz	BBC National DAB ensemble	BBC National DAB ensemble	BBC National DAB ensemble	BBC National DAB ensemble
3	12C	227.360 MHz	Local ensembles (except the south coast) (Note: Regional ensembles for the North East, South Wales and the Severn Estuary closed on 29 July 2013. North West closed on 24 September 2013.)	Local ensembles (Note: Regional ensembles for the North East, South Wales and the Severn Estuary closed on 29 July 2013. North West closed on 24 September 2013.)	Local ensembles	None
3	12D	229.072 MHz	Local ensembles (except the south coast); small scale DAB	Local ensembles	Local ensembles	Local ensembles

===== Crown Dependencies =====
The frequency plan and usage of DAB for the crown dependencies of the Channel Islands and the Isle of Man are co-ordinated and administered by the United Kingdom's media regulator Ofcom. The Isle of Man ensemble is granted a broadcasting licence from the Communications and Utilities Regulatory Authority.

VHF Band III sub-band	Block	Frequency	Channel Islands	Isle of Man
3	11C	220.352MHz	None	Local ensemble
3	12A	223.936MHz	Local ensemble	None
3	12B	225.648MHz	BBC National DAB ensemble	BBC National DAB ensemble

==== L Band ====
Under a Maastricht plan in 2002, the UK also has L band allocations for local terrestrial DAB, though there are no plans to broadcast any digital radio stations on L band. Ofcom auctioned spectrum in L band in 2008 for a number of uses, including terrestrial digital radio. On 16 May 2008, Ofcom declared that Qualcomm UK Spectrum Ltd had won the auction of L band frequencies in the UK.

==== BBC National DAB ====
The BBC's national DAB ensemble broadcasts on frequency block 12B (225.648 MHz) across the United Kingdom, with coverage currently at 96.4% of UK households. The multiplex is owned and operated by the BBC and is transmitted from a number of transmitter sites across the country. The BBC's national multiplex carries only BBC national radio stations. Local BBC radio stations are carried on the relevant local DAB ensemble where commercial DAB licences are operating.

==== Commercial DAB multiplexes ====
There are a number of commercial DAB multiplexes operators in the UK who run 48 local and regional DAB multiplexes across the United Kingdom. operators include the two national operators, Digital One and Sound Digital as well as local multiplex operators including NOW Digital, Bauer Media Group, Wireless Group, Switch Digital and MuxCo. Local and regional ensembles cover 77.8% of UK households.

==== Small scale DAB multiplexes ====
An increasing number of small scale DAB multiplexes broadcast in a number of areas across the UK. From what began with ten trial multiplexes (London, Manchester, Glasgow, Birmingham, Bristol, Portsmouth, Norwich, Brighton, Cambridge and Aldershot) with initially a nine-month trial, extended to March 2020 by Ofcom at the request of the Department for Culture, Media and Sport. In March 2020, the trial licences were extended again until December 2021. The trial multiplexes have mostly been replaced by permanent licences as awarded by Ofcom. By 6 October 2023 more than 230 areas had been identified for SSDAB licenses across six licensing rounds.

== Digital terrestrial television ==
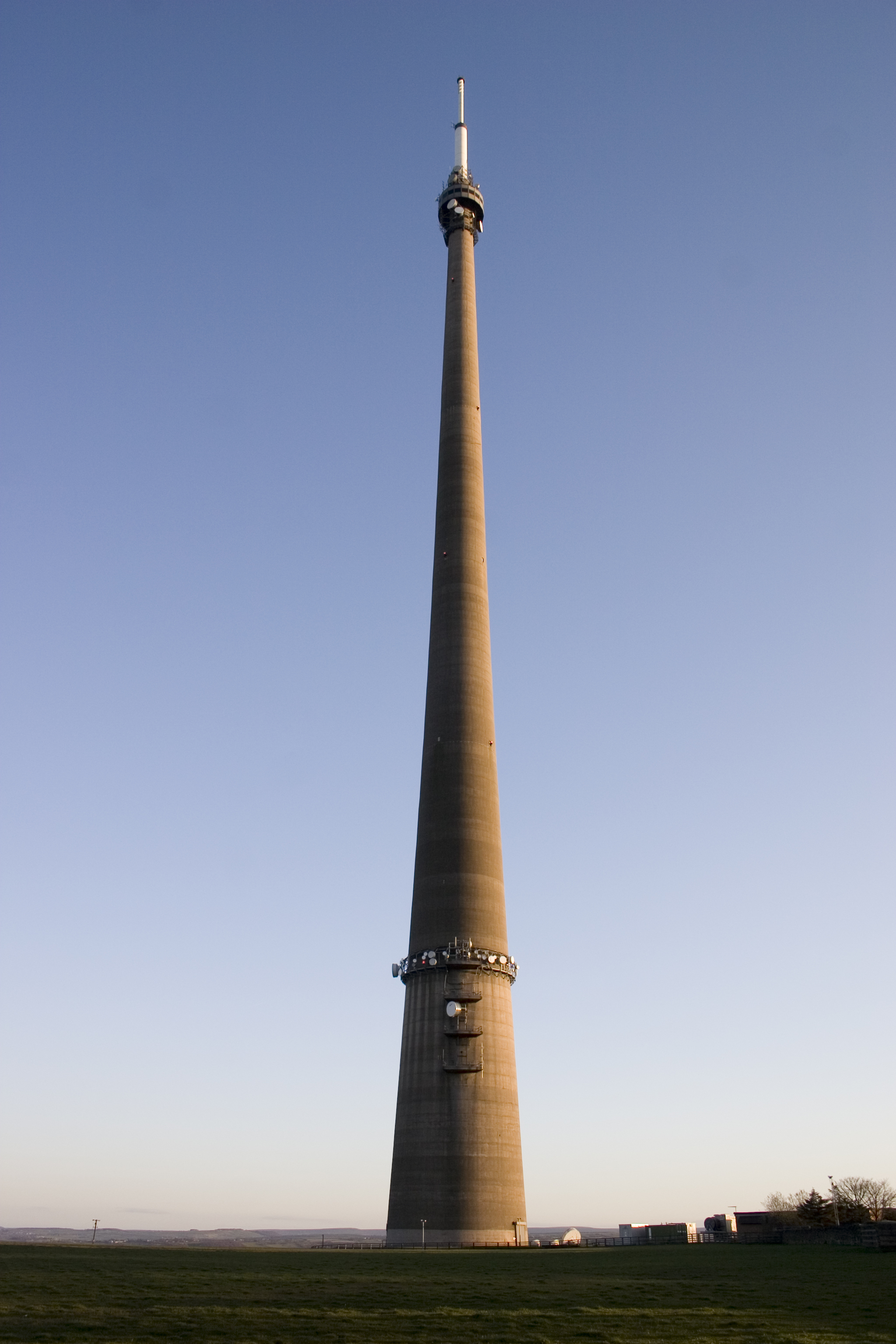
Transmitters including Emley Moor (pictured) broadcast digital radio via DAB and digital terrestrial television

Digital radio on the digital terrestrial platform started on 30 October 2002 (Note: Although not strictly classed as a digital radio service, BBC Parliament broadcast on digital terrestrial in audio only up until the launch of Freeview on 30 October 2002.) with the launch of the BBC's digital only radio services, BBC 1Xtra, BBC Radio 5 Live Sports Extra, BBC 6 Music, BBC Radio 7 and the BBC Asian Network, as well as existing stations BBC Radio 5 Live and the BBC World Service. All the stations broadcast on the BBC's multiplex B.

On the same day EMAP Radio (now owned by Bauer Radio) launched three radio stations, Smash Hits, Kerrang! and Kiss. Two other commercial radio stations also launched, oneword and Jazz FM.

The BBC later launched BBC Radio 1, Radio 2, Radio 3 and Radio 4 FM on multiplex A on 14 February 2003. These channels later moved to Multiplex 1 on 3 October 2007.

As of May 2022, the digital terrestrial platform has 28 radio stations broadcasting nationally from broadcasters including the BBC, Bauer Radio, Global Radio, and Wireless Group, as well as numerous BBC local stations.

== Digital satellite radio ==
Unlike North America, the UK does not have a commercial satellite radio service.

There are radio stations broadcasting via Satellite to the United Kingdom, however these are aimed at home users for playback through their televisions since these same satellites are also used for television broadcast and usually use SES' Astra series of satellites at 28.2° east or the Eutelsat 28A satellite at 28.5° east. Radio stations broadcast free-to-air via the Sky Digital, Freesat from Sky platforms and any DVB-S compliant set-top box. The Freesat platform has all the BBC's national and regional digital radio stations as well as BBC London 94.9 from the launch on 6 May 2008 on the EPG.

WorldSpace was planning a subscription based digital radio satellite service on the upper frequencies of the L band, however, Qualcomm beat WorldSpace in 2008, securing the L band frequencies in the Ofcom auction process.

== Digital cable television ==
A number of digital radio stations also broadcast through digital cable platforms, including Virgin Media and WightFibre.

== Internet radio ==
In the United Kingdom, over 350 of the UK's radio stations also stream their stations online, not including restricted service licence radio stations, hospital radio stations and stations who solely broadcast online. In total, about 2600 stations from the UK are streaming online.

In 2011, the BBC and commercial radio operators launched Radioplayer which allows over 400 radio stations to be listened to through its website and apps. In addition various radio stations and third parties allow streaming of internet radio stations through their own websites and apps. A number of British firms, including BT Group, Reciva, Pure Digital, Roberts Radio and Acoustic Energy have brought out Internet radio devices which use the Wi-Fi signal from a router to stream Internet radio stations within range of a Wi-Fi router. From the latter half of the 2010s, smart speakers have increased in popularity as a device for listening to live and on demand digital radio services.

RAJAR reported that in the period October 2016 to February 2017, 6% of BBC radio and 8% of commercial radio is listened to online and through apps.

=== 5G broadcast ===
The BBC is trialling 5G broadcast radio in the Orkney Islands with the view to provide a digital radio platform across the United Kingdom and in particular, areas which will be unlikely or never covered by DAB via the existing radio and forthcoming 5G transmission infrastructure with Internet Protocol broadcasting being seen as the long term replacement for DAB. The BBC's national services and the local BBC radio service, BBC Radio Orkney, is being delivered through a specially adapted BBC Sounds smartphone application to trialists. The BBC announced in May 2019 that it would extend the 5G broadcasting trial in Orkney until the end of September 2019.

=== Legal restrictions ===
In 2006, the Phonographic Performance Limited (PPL) announced that it would charge additional royalty fees on UK Internet radio stations if they broadcast outside the UK. Radio stations which stream online including GCap Media and GMG Radio, (Note: One exception to this was jazzfm.com, which continued to be streamed outside the UK.) have implemented IP blocking to prevent listeners outside the UK from listening to their radio stations and therefore avoided the increased fees.

In September 2020, TuneIn lost a court case brought by Sony Music and Warner Music Group in the UK's High Court of Justice. As a result of the case, radio stations not licensed by Ofcom in the UK can no longer legally be displayed on an "audio guide service", listened or tuned into by a listener without paying a royalty payment.

== Digital Radio Mondiale ==
Digital Radio Mondiale (DRM – not to be confused with Digital Rights Management) was being considered by Ofcom for introduction in Britain in 2012, on the present MW (medium wave) band. In the present day, transmissions are limited to a small number of broadcasts by the BBC and other international broadcasters.

In 2005, tests of DRM on shortwave radio from European transmitters broadcasting into the United Kingdom were performed by Virgin Radio, Classic Gold, Premier Christian Radio, Virgin Radio Classic Rock, Asian Sound and CVC.

The British Broadcasting Corporation started broadcasting the BBC World Service on shortwave and mediumwave radio for a few hours a day across Europe from Orford Ness in Suffolk and Kvitsøy in Norway, the latter being receivable across England, Wales and Southern Scotland. Today, the BBC broadcasts the BBC World Service using DRM for one hour a day from the Woofferton transmitting station in Shropshire.

The BBC undertook a trial of the digital radio mondiale (DRM) technology, which allowed them to explore digital radio using medium-wave frequencies. The trial broadcast BBC Radio Devon using the new technology in the Plymouth area from April 2007 and closed down on 31 October 2008. In May 2009, the BBC released a report on the trial in Devon. The report gave a number of conclusions about DRM from the trial:

- The sound quality from the trial was better than AM quality, but not as good as average DAB quality;
- The daytime coverage of the DRM trial extended further than the discontinued AM service. However, the night-time service, as expected to be smaller than daytime coverage due to the characteristics of medium wave broadcasting, did cause problems with interference to the DRM trial. The BBC stated this interference can be avoided, but only with a redesign of the transmission network;
- A single frequency network is possible and would be significantly robust.

== Digital Multimedia Broadcasting ==
In 2006, National Grid Wireless carried out a technical trial of T-DMB and DAB-IP on the Stoke & Stafford (formerly UTV-EMAP/Bauer Stoke) ensemble. The trial assessed the reception qualities of both technologies in urban and rural areas as well as the mobile television and radio services which could be delivered.

There was an ongoing experimental DMB multiplex broadcast in London on L-Band and Cambridge on VHF Band III, used for video, audio and data applications which have since ceased.

== Analogue switch-over ==
The Digital Economy Act 2010 has a requirement stating that the United Kingdom must prepare for digital switchover. On 29 January 2009 the UK Government's interim report into digital communication for the future by Lord Carter, Digital Britain, made the suggestion that DAB would be the future direction of digital radio in the United Kingdom. It states that only when the following conditions are met, a migration from FM to DAB would begin:

- Digital radio listening figures hit at least 50%;
- Coverage of national DAB matches that of FM and local DAB reaches of 90% of the population and all major roads

The original interim report of the Digital Radio Working Group published in 2008 specified that the 50% threshold for listening figures should be based on those for DAB. This was subsequently watered down to incorporate listening via any digital platform so as to make it easier to meet the criteria.

In 2010 the government created a digital action plan which was delivered in November 2013. On 16 December 2013 they announced that "now is not the time to commit to a switchover". An updated report was released in January 2014. Since 2010 Ofcom has produced annual reports on the take-up of digital radio. Subsequently, in 2018 the BBC stated it would keep some FM radio for the foreseeable future.

On 17 May 2018, RAJAR, the UK radio audience measurement research company for the UK radio industry published figures that stated that the UK had exceeded the threshold of 50% of radio listening was to digital radio platforms which will trigger the UK Government to begin a review of the progress of digital radio and assess future plans toward a potential digital switchover.

== Application and licensing ==
The United Kingdom media and communications regulator Ofcom (and before the formation of Ofcom, the Radio Authority) advertises and provides the licences for digital radio services in the United Kingdom, under the Broadcasting Acts of 1990 and 1996.

=== Application and licensing procedures ===
Ofcom awards licences for digital radio services differently depending on the type of service and the platform. Ofcom advertises the licences of new digital radio ensembles and are subject to an open competition to the highest bidder. Ensemble licence awards are awarded for twelve years. To broadcast a service on a DAB ensemble, a station must hold a Digital Sound Programme Service licence from Ofcom. On digital television services, individual stations can apply for either a digital cable and satellite licence to broadcast on the aforementioned platforms, or apply for a digital terrestrial licence to broadcast on digital terrestrial television.

On Digital Terrestrial Television and DAB, broadcasters also need to contact the ensemble or multiplex operator of a local or national DAB ensemble or digital terrestrial multiplex to broadcast within a region.

DAB ensemble operators have three elements to the charges they levy on radio services which are subject to a minimum fixed-term and do not include any other possible one-off fees for scenarios such as a station moving its base of operations to another location:

Fee	Description
Carriage Fee	A fee based on the capacity units and hours broadcast that a broadcaster pays. The more capacity units a service uses and the more hours a service broadcasts for, the higher the fee.
(Telecoms) Contribution Fee	A fee paid for the encoding and distribution of an audio feed to the ensemble operator. Depending on the ensemble operator, this could be charged to stations at a distance outside of the transmission area or could be charged universally.
Deposit	A fee levied at the beginning of the contract agreement, non-refundable and used to pay fees in the last year of the contract period. Depending on the ensemble operator, this could be applied to new companies or companies without a long-standing trading record or it could be applied universally.

On Digital Satellite, radio stations need to secure capacity with a transponder operator and an uplink to a satellite. To broadcast on the Sky platform, a broadcaster must also secure an EPG slot allowing viewers to navigate to their channel using the set-top-boxes provided by Sky. A request for an EPG slot must be done up to nine months in advance. The same procedure applies to secure a slot on the Freesat platform, although stations need to contact Freesat UK Ltd instead of Sky. On Digital Cable, broadcasters need to contact a cable supplier for carriage. All stations broadcast in the UK must legally hold a music copyright licence from the Phonographic Performance Limited, PRS for Music and Mechanical-Copyright Protection Society in order for royalties to be paid to the musicians the main bodies represent.

=== First national ensemble ===
On 24 March 1998, the Radio Authority advertised for the first (and at the time, the only one planned) national ensemble to be broadcast on DAB. The three national commercial services on FM and mediumwave had to be included as part of the ensemble, Classic FM, Talksport and Virgin Radio. The licence was awarded to the sole applicant, GWR Group and NTL Broadcast to form Digital One. The original licence application included the following stations:

Digital One Ltd (original application)
Classic FM	Classical music	GWR (now part of Global Radio)
Classic Gold Rock	Rock music	NTL
Club dance	Dance music	TBA
Plays, books and music	Comedy, drama and serials	TBA
Rolling news service	Rolling news	ITN
Soft AC	Female contemporary music	TBA
Sports channel	Live sports and comment	Talk Radio UK
Talk Radio (now Talksport)	Talk radio	Talk Radio UK (now owned by News Broadcasting)
Teen and chart hits	Pop and dance music	GWR (now part of Global Radio)
Virgin Radio	Complementary rock music	SMG plc

After the closure of PrimeTime Radio in 2006, the original licence was amended to allow the launch of a new classic and contemporary jazz service, theJazz which was launched on 25 December 2006, before 31 December 2006 deadline set in the licence amendment.

In April 2009, Global Radio, which had acquired GCap Media – part owner of Digital One, sold its 63% stake in the ensemble to Arqiva, making them the sole owner and operator of the ensemble.

On 26 July 2013, Digital One extended its broadcasts to Northern Ireland. Previously, only one VHF Band III frequency was allocated to Northern Ireland which was allocated to the local commercial ensemble. Block 11D became available in 2013 after digital television switchover in the United Kingdom and the Republic of Ireland.

=== Local ensembles ===
The Radio Authority (and subsequently Ofcom) continue to award regional ensemble licences to a number of radio groups with advertising of the licences starting from 1998, and licence awards being awarded from 10 May 1999, with the Birmingham ensemble being the first local licence being issued to CE Digital. The Birmingham ensemble licence award was followed by awards for licences in Manchester, Greater London, Glasgow and South Yorkshire, with more licences being awarded afterwards.

In October 2006, Ofcom announced a timetable of locations which would get its own DAB ensemble, where a local ensemble does not currently offer coverage. Three blocks will be made available in VHF Band III. In May 2007, Ofcom replaced the York and Scarborough proposed licence area for a licence which covers the whole of North Yorkshire, and the Guildford plus Reigate and Crawley licences were merged to cover Surrey.

Areas covered are as follows:

Area	Advertisement date	Block	Winning applicant	Ensemble name
Hertfordshire, Bedfordshire and Buckinghamshire	December 2006	10D	NOW Digital	NOW Home Counties
Derbyshire	January 2007	10B	NOW Digital (East Midlands)	NOW Derbyshire
Wrexham and Chester	February 2007	10D	MuxCo	MuxCo North East Wales & West Cheshire
Hereford and Worcestershire	March 2007	10B	MuxCo	MuxCo Hereford & Worcester
Northamptonshire	April 2007	10C	NOW Digital	NOW Northampton
Oxford	May 2007	10B	NOW Digital	NOW Oxford
Gloucestershire	July 2007	10C	MuxCo	MuxCo Gloucestershire
North Yorkshire	June 2007	12D	MuxCo	MuxCo North Yorkshire
Mid and West Wales	August 2007	12D	MuxCo	MuxCo Mid and West Wales
Surrey and Northern Sussex	September 2007	10C	MuxCo	MuxCo Surrey and Northern Sussex
Lincolnshire	October 2007	10D (Note: The Lincolnshire ensemble began broadcasts on block 12A after the Yorkshire ensemble closed.)	MuxCo	MuxCo Lincolnshire

As part of the Digital Economy Act 2010 which gained Royal Assent and became law on 8 April. 2010, some DAB ensembles will be reorganised and merged. As a result, local ensembles waited for both the act to commence on 12 June 2010 and a report on the planning of DAB coverage and frequencies across the UK, with the final publication made to Government on 1 May 2012 before going ahead with announcements on the launch of additional local ensembles.

In 2019, a few additional areas not covered by a local ensemble were advertised:

Area	Advertisement date	Block	Winning applicant	Ensemble name
Channel Islands	April 2019	12A (originally 11C was also an option)	Bailiwick Broadcasting Limited	Channel Islands
Morecambe Bay (Note: Originally advertised as two separate ensembles, Morecambe Bay as well as North and West Cumbria and Southwest Scotland. Plans were changed in June 2019 to allow applicants to decide which frequency blocks and areas they cover within the perspective area.)	June 2019	11B (originally 12D) (Note: 12D is the internationally agreed frequency allotment for this area under the GE06 Plan. Wohnort's DAB Ensembles Worldwide website and the Arqiva coverage maps in the MuxCo Cumbria Limited application designate 11B as the frequency for this ensemble.)	MuxCo Cumbria Limited	Morecambe Bay
North and West Cumbria	June 2019	11B	Bauer Digital Radio Limited	North Cumbria
Southwest Scotland	June 2019	10D	No applicants	N/A

=== Regional ensembles ===
The first regional licence to cover a greater area of land compared to a local ensemble was awarded on 6 October 2000 to Switch Digital for Central Scotland Other areas which were awarded and classed as regional licences include:

Region	Operator	Licence award date	On air date	Closure date
Central Scotland	Switch Digital	6 October 2000	June 2001	N/A
North East England	MXR Ltd	15 December 2000	July 2001	29 July 2013
South Wales and the Severn Estuary	MXR Ltd	23 January 2001	July 2001	29 July 2013
West Midlands	MXR Ltd	9 February 2001	August 2001	27 August 2013
North West England	MXR Ltd	9 March 2001	September 2001	24 September 2013
Yorkshire	MXR Ltd	28 November 2002	June 2003	29 June 2015

In March 2009, Ofcom made a recommendation to the Government in their Radio in Digital Britain report that the regional ensembles should expand into a nationwide regionalised service to fill the gap made by the 4Digital Group pulling out of the second national ensemble. Ofcom cited that the regions for the second national ensemble would be:

- The East Midlands, East Anglia, mid and southern Lincolnshire;
- London, Southern England, the South East and the South Midlands;
- Northern Ireland;
- North East England and Cumbria;
- North West England;
- Scotland;
- The West Midlands;
- Wales;
- The West and South West of England;
- Yorkshire, the North Midlands and North Lincolnshire.

On 25 September 2012, it was announced that the MXR multiplexes will close between July and September 2013 after the shareholders Global Radio & Arqiva decided not to renew the licences. Digital Radio UK stated that the released frequencies of the closed regional multiplexes would be reused for local DAB coverage roll-out.

=== Second national ensemble ===
==== First licence advertisement ====
Ofcom announced in 2005 that they would be advertising for the second national digital ensemble. As a result, GCap threatened to take Ofcom to court after being told by the Radio Authority that there would not be another national ensemble. The court action was dropped after Ofcom assured GCap that none of the stations on the second ensemble would compete with existing stations on the Digital One ensemble.

On 1 December 2006, Ofcom advertised a licence for a second national digital ensemble to launch new digital radio and multimedia services on frequency block 11A (216.928 MHz). Applications needed to be submitted to Ofcom by 28 March 2007.

On 29 March 2007, Ofcom announced that it had received two applications for the second national digital ensemble, from the 4 Digital Group and National Grid Wireless. The radio channels which made up both applications are as follows:

4 Digital Group
Channel 4 Radio	Speech	Channel 4 Radio
Closer	Female music and lifestyle	EMAP
Disney	Children's radio	The Walt Disney Company
E4 Radio	Youthful entertainment and music	Channel 4 Radio
Original	Album led alternative music	CanWest Global Communications
Pure 4	Adult music and speech	Channel 4 Radio
Sky News Radio	Rolling news	British Sky Broadcasting
Sunrise Radio	Asian music and community programming	Sunrise Radio Group
talkRadio	Talk radio	UTV plc
Virgin Radio Viva	Younger female music station	SMG plc
Podcast service	Various podcasts	Various

National Grid Wireless
BBC Asian Network	Asian music and entertainment	BBC
Channel 4 Radio Station 1	TBA	Channel 4 Radio
Channel 4 Radio Station 2	TBA	Channel 4 Radio
Colourful	News and Afro-Caribbean community radio	Colourful Media Limited
Confidential	50+ radio station	Confidential
Confidential	Adult-Album	Confidential
Confidential	Asian radio station	Confidential
Confidential	Love songs	Confidential
Confidential	Rolling news	Confidential
Fun Radio	Children's programming (13 hours)	Children's Radio UK Limited
Premier Christian Radio	Christian programming	London Christian Radio Limited
Radio Luxembourg	Youthful alternative and indie music	CLT/UFA
Radio Play	Interactive participation radio (6 hours)	Somethin' Else

On 6 July 2007 Ofcom awarded the licence for the second national ensemble to the 4 Digital Group, who were required to launch its services one year after its licence award. However, on 10 October 2008 the 4 Digital Group pulled its plans for digital radio, including the launch of the second multiplex. Ofcom held talks with the other remaining shareholders of the 4 Digital Group to see if they were willing to continue with the launch. In March 2009, Ofcom recommended to the Government that the second national ensemble should be regionalised, formed by the existing regional ensembles.

==== Second licence advertisement ====
On 1 July 2014, Ofcom re-advertised the second national ensemble licence on frequency 11A for interested parties to submit applications by 31 October 2014. The deadline was extended to 15:00 on 29 January 2015.

On 29 January 2015, it was announced that two bidders had applied for the licence to run the second national ensemble. Listen2Digital, run primarily by Orion Media and Babcock International Group amongst others and Sound Digital, run by Arqiva, Bauer and UTV amongst others. On 27 March, Sound Digital was announced as the winning bidder.

The list of proposed radio stations submitted to Ofcom were as follows:

Listen2Digital
GEM	Female Adult Contemporary	Orion Media	DAB
Fun Kids	Children	Children's Radio UK	DAB
Sabras Radio	Asian Contemporary	Sabras Sound	DAB
Panjab Radio	Asian Specialist	Panjab Radio	DAB
Share Radio	Finance	Share Radio	DAB
Premier Christian Radio	Christian (currently on Digital One)	Premier Christian Communications	DAB
Premier Gospel	Christian Gospel	Premier Christian Communications	DAB
Nation Radio	Male Adult Contemporary	Town & Country Broadcasting	DAB
The Wireless	Oldies	Age UK	DAB
TBC	Sports Radio	Confidential	DAB
TBC	Food	Confidential	DAB
TBC	Jazz	Confidential	DAB
TBC	Modern Rock	Confidential	DAB
TBC	Contemporary Hits	Confidential	DAB
RTÉ Radio 1	Irish Public Service Broadcasting	Raidió Teilifís Éireann	DAB+
Gaydio	LGBT	Gaydio Digital	DAB+
Chris Country	Country	Chris Country Broadcasting	DAB+
Upload Radio	Special Events	Folder Media	DAB+

Sound Digital
talkRADIO	Speech	UTV Radio	DAB
talkSPORT 2	Sports Talk	UTV Radio	DAB
talkBUSINESS	Business	UTV Radio	DAB
Magic Mellow	Relaxing Music	Bauer	DAB
KISSTORY	"Old Skool" Dance	Bauer	DAB
heat radio	Pop Music	Bauer	DAB
Absolute 80s	80s Music (currently on Digital One)	Bauer	DAB
Planet Rock	Rock Music (currently on Digital One)	Bauer	DAB
Virgin Radio	Rock & Pop	UTV Radio/Bauer	DAB
Jazz FM	Jazz	Jazz FM Investments Ltd	DAB
UCB Inspirational	Christian	United Christian Broadcasters Limited	DAB
Premier Christian Radio	Christian (currently on Digital One)	Premier Christian Communications	DAB
Sunrise Radio	Asian Music & Speech	Sunrise Radio (London) Limited	DAB
British Muslim Radio	Muslim	Asian Sound Radio Limited	DAB
TBC	TBC	Confidential	DAB+

=== Small Scale DAB ===
==== Trials ====
After experimentation on the Brighton experimental ensemble, Ofcom advertised for small scale DAB multiplexes to broadcast across the United Kingdom on ten localised multiplexes for a nine-month trial period, then extended for an extra two years and then until December 2021. The trials were intended to test the viability of using free and open source software (FOSS) with low cost equipment to broadcast from a single transmitter, a single frequency network or channel repeaters to allow smaller radio stations to broadcast more cost effectively than is currently possible on local multiplexes.

Trial Ensembles
Area	Operator
Single Transmitter
Aldershot	BFBS Aldershot
Birmingham	Switch Radio
Brighton and Hove	Brighton and Hove Radio
Bristol	Celador Radio
Manchester	Niocast Digital
Norwich	Future Digital Norfolk
Portsmouth	Angel Radio
Single Frequency Network
Glasgow	Brave Broadcasting
London	U.DAB
Channel Repeater
Cambridge	UKRD

In September 2016, Ofcom released its final report into the experiences and results of the small scale DAB trials deeming them to be successful and technically sound. A number of conclusions were made regarding the trials:

- The hardware and FOSS worked well with few technical problems. Issues identified regarding single frequency networks and software stability and usability have been identified and have either been fixed or are being worked on;
- Multiplex operators are working together, sharing experiences of running the trial multiplexes and furthering DAB features such as slideshows and additional DAB+ services. Seventy new services have launched across the ten multiplexes with a test and development multiplex launched afterward, inspired by the trials;
- There is demand for a roll-out of small scale DAB multiplexes across the UK which Ofcom deems as "technically possible and commercially sustainable".

A future roll-out of small scale DAB multiplexes would be performed with a number of DAB frequency blocks, subject to business users migrating away from those frequencies and also subject to parliamentary approval through the Broadcasting (Radio Multiplex Services) Act 2017 2016–17 which gained royal assent on 27 April 2017. This should allow at least one multiplex in most parts of the UK.

==== Permanent small scale DAB rollout ====
The rollout of small scale DAB ensembles began from 1 September 2020 in areas with high demand for services and greatest benefit for small scale DAB services in round one and then ensembles within the North West of England for round two and a further number of ensembles in each subsequent round. Applications for potential licensees are advertised for approximately two months before applicants are announced one month later. Licences are awarded from two months after the announcement of licence applicants with ensembles expected to launch by eighteen months from the date of their licence award.

The first permanent small scale DAB multiplex launched in Tynemouth and South Shields on 11 December 2021. Small scale DAB multiplex licenses are grouped into rounds with the first covering the test services already established and some large cities. All round one areas were expected to be operational during 2022. Round two covered North West England with license awards in May 2022. Round three included more large towns with license awards completed in November 2022. Round 4 licenses were advertised in July 2022. Round 5 licenses which cover London and the South East of England were advertised in early 2023. 27 areas for round 6 were announced in October 2023. The final round of licences were advertised in May 2025.

In October 2023, UK DAB Networks one of the operators of SSDAB multiplexes started proceedings for Voluntary Liquidation.

== Digital Radio UK ==
Digital Radio UK is an organisation which represents the interests of the digital radio industry including the BBC, commercial radio companies and transmission network operator, Arqiva. The organisation also promotes the use and take up of DAB in the United Kingdom and ensure that the deadline for digital migration in 2015 is met. Digital Radio UK is formed from the Digital Radio Delivery Group which also absorbed the Digital Radio Development Bureau (DRDB). Part of DRDB's plans, and under Digital Radio UK still is, will be to promote DAB uptake through a website for consumers as well as print and radio advertising.

== See also ==
- Radio in the United Kingdom
- DAB ensemble
- Digital Radio Mondiale
- List of radio stations in the United Kingdom
- List of DAB multiplexes in the United Kingdom
- The Radio Academy
