= 2024 in British radio =

This is a list of events in 2024 relating to radio in the United Kingdom.

== Events ==
=== January ===
- 1 January –
  - Launch of Bournemouth One. The station begins with a welcome message from Tobias Ellwood, the MP for Bournemouth East.
  - Josh Tate, believed to be the UK's youngest newsreader, presents his own New Year's Day show on Radio Exe.
  - Former Radio 2 presenter Steve Madden joins Portsmouth's Victory Radio to present a late night weekend show.
  - Alex Hall presents her final show for BBC Radio Tees after 35 years in local radio, 18 of them with Radio Tees.
- 2 January –
  - Audible Always, producers of the internationally syndicated programme Selector Radio, confirms that Radio 1 presenter Sian Eleri will take over as presenter of the weekly show.
  - Bauer Radio's Greatest Hits Radio South experimentally drops local news bulletins from its Salisbury frequencies in favour of a mixed Salisbury/Hampshire regional news service from south Hampshire-based Wave 105, which it later says was done because it felt a city specific bulletin for Salisbury "sounded jarring and parochial against industry-leading shows such as Ken Bruce and Simon Mayo". Local news is restored to Salisbury in March after a review following a bulletin containing a story about Portsmouth, an hour's drive from Salisbury.
- 3 January – Pete Black announces he is leaving the role of Bauer Media Audio UK's Director of Music after 18 years with the company.
- 4 January – Paddy Power and Virgin Radio sign a 12-month deal to sponsor The Ryan Tubridy Show.
- 5 January –
  - Jason Rosam presents his final edition of BBC Radio London early breakfast show.
  - Speaking to the At Home with Vick and Jordan podcast, Ant & Dec discuss how they almost became presenters of the Radio 1 Breakfast Show after being asked to record a pilot. The show was eventually presented by Sara Cox.
- 6 January – Danielle Perry succeeds Angellica Bell as presenter of the Saturday mid-morning show on Scala Radio.
- 7 January –
  - Stephen Mangan joins Classic FM to present a Sunday afternoon show.
  - Boom Radio announces plans to launch a sister station named Boom Rock in February. The station will become the third in the Boom family.
- 8 January –
  - Dan Walker replaces Tim Lihoreau as presenter of Classic FM's breakfast show. The change sees the programme move from its previous slot of 6am to 9am to a new slot of 6.30am to 10am. Lihoreau, who had hosted the programme for the previous 12 years, becomes the new presenter of the station's weekend breakfast show as part of wider changes to the weekend schedule.
  - Preston-based Beat Radio is rebranded as Juice Radio, and appears on 103.2FM.
  - Happy Radio have hired Fiona Sadler and Alex Roland to present a weekday evening and overnight show respectively.
- 10 January –
  - Bauer announces that Free Radio, Gem Radio, Hallam FM, Lincs FM, Metro Radio, Pulse 1, Radio City, Rock FM, Signal 1, TFM, Viking FM and Wave Swansea will all be rebranding to Hits Radio from April. The stations will continue to have local breakfast output, but will have networked programming at other times. Local news, advertising and traffic updates will also continue to air.
  - BBC Radio Scotland confirms that Martin Geissler will present the Monday to Wednesday editions of its Drivetime programme following the departure of John Beattie.
- 11 January – HSBC UK have extended their sponsorship of Global's The News Agents podcast for a further 12 months.
- 14 January –
  - Comedian Tom Allen joins Virgin Radio to present a weekly Sunday afternoon show.
  - Carol Vorderman joins LBC to present a Sunday afternoon show from 4pm to 7pm, having previously provided cover for other LBC presenters.
  - Debut of Smooth Radio's new television advertising campaign featuring famous UK landmarks and its new strapline, "Always the best music".
- 15 January – The Intellectual Property Office launches a consultation on how record labels and artists from overseas should receive royalties for material broadcast in the UK.
- 17 January – Kiss have signed a 12-month deal with Costa Coffee to sponsor their breakfast shows on Kiss, Kisstory and Kiss Fresh.
- 18 January – Following a consultation, Ofcom gives approval for BBC Radio Cymru 2 to become a fully fledged radio station.
- 19 January – Sunshine 855 switches off its medium wave frequency on 855 kHz, having been granted permission to do so by Ofcom due to the expensive cost of maintaining the transmitters and the small number of listeners who listen on medium wave.
- 20 January – DJ Ace presents his final R&B show on BBC 1Xtra after 21 years with the network; Chuckie is lined up to replace him.
- 22 January –
  - BBC 1Xtra launches a second show produced from Birmingham, with DJ Day Day presenting weekday mid-mornings, also in place of DJ Ace.
  - The relaunched version of Laser 558 becomes available on Freeview on Channel 277 via the radio portal.
  - Scarborough's Coast and County Radio is found to be in breach of Ofcom's rules following a showbiz news report about the health of Barry Humphries in which it was reported he was being treated in hospital three days after his death.
- 25 January – Times Radio announces a 12-month deal with Nationwide Building Society to sponsor their breakfast show.
- 27 January – British band No Guidnce begin a four-week residence guest presenting the R&B show on BBC 1Xtra.
- 29 January – BBC Radio 2 launches the 2024 series of its Radio 2 Piano Room feature, with Bruce Hornsby as the first guest.
- 30 January – The Media Bill, which proposes changes to radio in the United Kingdom such as reducing regulations for commercial radio and improving access through smart devices, passes its third reading in the House of Commons.
- 31 January –
  - The rock band Nothing but Thieves play an exclusive gig for Radio X listeners at London's O2 Forum Kentish Town.
  - BBC Radio Solent is scheduled to air the final edition of its indie and alternative music show, Stereo Underground, but drops it from the schedule at the last minute without explanation. The programme will continue to air after moving to the Mixcloud app.

=== February ===
- 1 February – RAJAR figures are published for the final quarter of 2023, and indicate that there were 39.1 million weekly listeners to radio, an increase from 38.1 during the previous quarter. GB News Radio increases its average listener base to 430,000, while listeners to Boom Radio are down slightly on the previous quarter to 627,000.
- 2 February – Ofcom revokes the small-scale DAB licence award for Warminster, Devizes & Trowbridge after the bidder awarded the licence said they could not launch a service within the 18 month timeframe specified by the award.
- 6 February –
  - Talksport has secured a two-year deal with Rugby League Commercial for broadcast rights for men's and women's Super League rugby matches.
  - Times Radio rebrands itself as The Election Station ahead of a general election, expected some time in 2024.
- 7 February –
  - The BBC announces plans to launch four new radio stations on DAB+, including a Radio 2 spin-off playing music from the 1950s, 60s and 70s, and a Radio 1 spin-off playing music from the past two decades. The plans are objected to by the commercial radio sector, which describes the new stations as unnecessary.
  - Global announces plans to launch The Sports Agents, a sister programme to its The News Agents podcast, which will be presented by Gabby Logan and Mark Chapman on Tuesdays and Thursdays.
- 8 February –
  - LBC and Classic FM are launched on DAB+ in the Channel Islands.
  - Winchester DAB Ltd relaunches the Winchester small-scale DAB network after the previous operator went into receivership in November 2023.
- 11 February – BBC Radio 6 Music airs its final programme to be broadcast from Wogan House.
- 12 February –
  - Suzie McGuire joins Nation Radio Scotland to present weekday evenings as Nation Broadcasting expands its Scottish content.
  - Anna Sedgley announces she is leaving her post as Group Chief Financial Officer at Bauer Media after three years in the role.
- 13 February – At 5.00pm BBC Radio 2 and BBC Radio 5 Live break the news of the death of radio presenter Steve Wright, who died on 12 February. The announcement is followed by on-air tributes from colleagues throughout the radio industry.
- 14 February –
  - KISS announces that DJ Ace will join to present a Sunday evening R&B show.
  - Boom Rock is launched, with a station ID featuring the voice of Tommy Vance, who died in 2005, but whose voice has been recreated using artificial intelligence with permission from his family.
- 16 February –
  - Jordan North confirms he will be leaving Radio 1 after ten years; Jamie Laing will succeed him as co-presenter of the weekday drivetime show alongside Vick Hope.
  - The Radio Today website reports that Oxis Media, which owns the Jack FM brand, plans to relaunch the station in the UK at a time of its choosing.
  - Smart Outdoor Media takes an equity stake in north east DAB station Frisk Radio.
- 17 February –
  - Gary Davies presents a special edition of Pick of the Pops paying tribute to Steve Wright, with charts from 1980 and 1996, the years Wright joined Radios 1 and 2 respectively.
  - JLS band member Aston Merrygold stands in for Ashley Roberts on Heart 00s while Roberts is on holiday.
- 18 February –
  - Liza Tarbuck presents a special edition of Sunday Love Songs on Radio 2 in tribute to Steve Wright.
  - Gavin Wallace joins Nation Radio Scotland to present a Sunday show.
  - Paul Gambaccini presents the final BBC Radio 2 programme to be broadcast live from Wogan House.
- 19 February –
  - Elizabeth Clark is appointed director of the newly created BBC radio production hub for Scotland and Northern Ireland.
  - Roman Kemp announces he is leaving Capital Breakfast after a decade presenting on the Capital network.
- 20 February –
  - The team behind the relaunched Laser 558 have obtained a licence to broadcast on DAB, and will launch on DAB in Wiltshire and Basingstoke.
  - Heart announces a sponsorship deal with the National Lottery to sponsor its "Make Me a Millionaire" competition.
  - Greatest Hits Radio announces its first Greatest Hits Radio cruise in association with Ambassador Cruises, which will take passengers on a cruise from London to Hamburg along the River Elbe in October, and feature regular presenters Ken Bruce, Martin Kemp, Jenny Powell and Kate Thornton.
  - GB News announces it has ended its radio advertising and sponsorship contract with Bauer Media, and that it is launching its own advertising sales operation.
- 21 February –
  - Capital confirms that Jordan North will replace Roman Kemp on Capital Breakfast from April.
  - Community stations Blackburn's 102.2 and Takeover Radio 106.9 are found to have breached Ofcom's key commitments over output.
- 22 February – Lyca Radio is announced as the official partner of the 22nd Asian Achievers Awards, replacing Sunrise Radio.
- 23 February – BBC Radio 2 broadcasts the final edition of the 2024 series of Radio 2 Piano Room.
- 24 February – Graham Norton announces he is leaving his weekend shows at Virgin Radio with effect from the following day; Virgin boss Mike Cass confirms Norton will still present on the station.
- 25 February –
  - At 8am, Erewash Sound presenter Richard Dawson begins a sponsored broadcast marathon that is scheduled to end at midday on 27 February.
  - Noreen Khan presents her final regular programme for BBC Asian Network.
- 26 February –
  - Martha Kearney announces she will leave Radio 4's Today programme later in the year.
  - Virgin Radio announces that the Kim Wilde 80s Show will be broadcast on Virgin Radio 80s Plus on Sundays from 10am–2pm.
- 27 February –
  - Bauer announces plans to rebrand Wave 105 as Greatest Hits Radio South Coast and Pirate FM as Greatest Hits Radio Cornwall.
  - Ofcom approves 14 applications for funds from the Community Radio Fund, with community stations receiving a share of £250,000.
  - Stephen Miron announces he is standing down as Global's Group Chief Executive in March 2025.
- 28 February –
  - Radio 1 announces schedule changes, which include moving Matt Edmondson and Mollie King to early afternoons (Monday to Thursday) from July.
  - Radio 2 is forced to switch to a back-up service after a technical glitch takes the station off air during Vernon Kay's mid-morning show.
  - Former BBC Radio London presenter Jason Rosam is to present the breakfast show on Battersea's Riverside Radio.
- 29 February – Noreen Khan presents the BBC Asian Network Comedy Gala from Glasgow before leaving the station.

=== March ===
- 1 March –
  - East Devon Radio is rebranded as DevonAIR Radio, the third time it has changed its name since launching as Bay FM Radio in 2006.
  - Easy Radio is rebranded as Swansea Bay Radio, the third time the station has broadcast with that name.
  - Launch of Angel Radio +1 on DAB in Portsmouth, the UK's first timeshift radio service.
  - Thea Taylor joins Radio 1 to present Friday's early breakfast show during March as part of a monthly rotation of presenters on the show.
- 2 March – Scala Radio begins introducing more presenter-free programming, leading to the departures of presenters Mark Forrest, Mark Kermode, Luci Holland, Richard Allinson and Sam Hughes.
- 3 March – Radio News Hub offers a free programme presented by Gaby Roslin to coincide with the UK's Day of Reflection.
- 4 March –
  - Jamie Laing succeeds Jordan North as co-presenter of Radio 1's weekday drivetime show alongside Vick Hope.
  - BBC Radio Cymru 2 extends its broadcasting hours, going from four to nine hours on Mondays to Thursdays, four to six hours on Fridays and from three to 14 hours on Sundays.
- 5 March – Blackpool's Coastal DAB is found in breach of Ofcom's Broadcasting Code for mentioning ticket sales for an event during a news bulletin.
- 6 March –
  - BBC Radio 4 confirms that the next series of The Now Show, due to air in Spring 2024, will be its last.
  - Simon Pitts is appointed Group Chief Executive of Global Media from early 2025.
- 7 March –
  - Howard Hughes joins Radio News Hub to present news bulletins for a day to mark the company's ninth anniversary.
  - Radio 1 announces that Lauren Layfield and Shanequa Paris are to present Radio 1's Life Hacks, replacing Katie Thistleton and Vick Hope.
  - Bauer Media Audio UK announces a partnership deal to be the official radio partner of Manchester's new Co-op Live arena.
- 11 March –
  - Launch of the 50th small-scale DAB multiplex as the multiplex in Shropshire goes on air.
  - Scott Hughes, formerly of Radio City, joins Merseyside's In Demand Radio to present weekday drivetime.
- 12 March –
  - The Radio Today website reports that Bauer plans to remove its radio stations from Freeview in the coming months.
  - BBC Radio 3, BBC Radio 4 and BBC Radio 4 Extra are to broadcast a season of radio plays that have been returned to the BBC Archives after 1,000 plays were donated by the Radio Circle.
  - Bauer is to increase the area coverage of Hits Radio Pride as heritage stations are rebranded, with areas where Hits Radio already broadcasts having their heritage frequencies taken over by Hits Radio Pride.
- 13 March – Sam Sax, a DJ who mixes saxophone with house music, is named Kiss's Chosen One as the station's search for a new DJ concludes.
- 14 March – Chris Sawyer, co-producer of the Radio 1 Breakfast Show, announces he is leaving his role after fifteen years.
- 15 March –
  - The BBC confirms that Emma Barnett will leave her role presenting Woman's Hour in April to become a presenter on the Today programme.
  - BBC Radio Wales appoints Lucy Owen of Wales Today as the permanent presenter of its Saturday lunchtime slot, which Owen has presented since the departure of Carol Vorderman.
  - Christopher Jones is appointed as Chief Financial Officer of Bauer Media Audio UK.
- 18 March –
  - Radioplayer announces the launch of new apps and a deal with Google for voice-activated devices.
  - BBC Radio 2 announces a series of programmes to celebrate the 50th anniversary of ABBA's Eurovision Song Contest 1974 win.
- 19 March –
  - The BBC confirms plans to sell adverts on some of its podcasts when streamed through platforms such as Apple and Spotify.
  - Plans are announced for HGV Radio, an online radio station for truckers.
  - Greatest Hits Radio confirms that Scott Temple and Holly Day will present weekday afternoons on Greatest Hits Radio Cornwall from April.
- 20 March –
  - Ofcom fines Big City Radio £1,200 after finding it in breach of its Kay Commitments for not broadcasting enough local content, including news, travel, weather, community information and sport. The findings follow an investigation after Ofcom received a complaint before the station's change to BRMB.
  - Bauer Media Audio UK agrees a deal to acquire the software streaming company, SharpStream, subject to regulatory approval.
- 21 March – The UK government appoints a panel of nine experts from the world of radio, television and business to advise on the future funding of the BBC.
- 22 March –
  - Ofcom opens a three-month consultation process on whether to relax the Key Commitments criteria for community radio stations.
  - The 2024 Global Awards are announced. Winners include Raye and Calvin Harris.
- 23 March – Frank Skinner announces he is leaving Absolute Radio in May after 15 years, and after his contract was not renewed.
- 24 March – Tony Blackburn presents the final edition of his syndicated programme on BBC Radio Berkshire, BBC Radio Oxford and BBC Radio Solent.
- 25 March – BBC Radio 1 confirms that its Friday Early Breakfast Show will be presented by Richie Driss in April and SMASHBengali in May as it continues a rotating presenter format for the programme.
- 26 March – Global appoints Dena McCallum as the Chair of Trustees at its Make Some Noise charity, replacing Jo Kenrick.
- 28 March –
  - BBC Radio 5 Live celebrates its 30th anniversary with a day of special programming.
  - Boom Radio presents a day of programmes to mark the 60th anniversary of the launch of Radio Caroline.
  - Tony Blackburn stages a takeover of the Radio 2 Breakfast Show to celebrate Radio Caroline's 60th birthday.
  - Roman Kemp presents his final Capital Breakfast show on Capital after being with the network for 10 years.
  - Mariella Frostrup announces she will step down from her lunchtime presenting role at Times Radio.
  - Final day of broadcast for Wave 105 before it switches to Greatest Hits Radio, with Wave signing off at 10pm.
- 29 March –
  - Huntingdon Community Radio holds a 12-hour marathon broadcast to raise awareness of autism.
  - Radio Lomond, launched online in 2020, begins broadcasting on DAB in the Glasgow area.
- 31 March – BBC Radio 4's long wave opt-outs end after the 12.01 Shipping Forecast.
- March – Salisbury-specific bulletins on the Salisbury frequencies of Greatest Hits Radio South on weekdays are reinstated two months after Bauer dropped them in favour of regional bulletins from Wave 105.

=== April ===
- 1 April –
  - Changes to the BBC Radio 4 weekly schedule begin.
  - The Daily Service is broadcast on BBC Radio 4 Extra for the first time and Shipping Forecasts are reduced from four bulletins each day to two on weekdays and three at the weekend.
  - A new weeknight jazz programme launches on BBC Radio 3. Titled Round Midnight, the show is presented by saxophonist, composer and MC Soweto Kinch.
  - Boom Radio listeners vote Procol Harum's "Whiter Shade of Pale" their favourite track in the station's All Time Top 200. The chart is noted for including only one track by a female artist in its top 30 – "Goin' Back" by Dusty Springfield at number 30.
- 2 April –
  - Radio 2 confirms that Michael Ball will take over as presenter of Sunday Love Songs from June.
  - The BBC World Service confirms that Ella Al-Shamahi and Datshiane Navanayagam are the new hosts of its series The Conversation.
  - Josh Curnow and Laura Mac launch a new weekday breakfast show on Rewind Radio.
  - Sun FM is to be rebranded as Nation Radio North East from May.
  - Bauer removes its radio stations from Freeview.
- 3 April –
  - Radio 1 announces its Radio 1 Residency Thursday late night presenters for April, May and June, with Fleur Shore presenting in April, Emerald in May and Ben Hemsley in June.
  - West Hull FM 106.9FM announces a rebrand to Humber Wave Radio to coincide with its launch on DAB+ from mid-April.
- 5 April –
  - It is announced that Garry Richardson will, in September, step down from presenting the sports news on Radio 4's Today programme, after 43 years in the role and 50 with the BBC.
  - Free Thinking is first broadcast as a weekly programme on BBC Radio 4, having transferred from Radio 3; and Friday Night Is Music Night transfers to Radio 3, having run on Radio 2 (or predecessor) since 1953.
- 7 April –
  - Broadcaster, presenter and podcaster Zeze Millz joins Capital XTRA to present a Sunday morning show.
  - V2 Radio announces it is launching on DAB in Hampshire, thus expanding beyond the Sussex area, and as a potential alternative to the now defunct Wave 105.
- 8 April –
  - Ofcom launches an investigation into the 29 March edition of David Lammy's show on LBC to determine whether it broke the rules regarding politicians acting as newsreaders.
  - Jordan North succeeds Roman Kemp as the new host of "Capital Breakfast" on Capital.
  - Laura Anderson joins Fat Brestovci to co-present the Breakfast show on Capital Scotland.
  - Bauer hires Marvin Humes to present daily shows on Kiss and Kisstory.
- 9 April – Magic Radio announces a partnership with Wickes to sponsor their drivetime show.
- 10 April – Academy FM in Thanet, Kent, is presented with The King's Award for Voluntary Service by Lord Lieutenant Lady Colgrain.
- 13 April – Boom Radio announces the launch of a £500,000 advertising campaign on ITV1, its first on the channel. Jo Brand has also been hired to present a series of programmes in which she interviews prominent television personalities, including Michael Grade.
- 15 April –
  - BBC Radio 2 announces that Mark Goodier will succeed Steve Wright as presenter of Pick of the Pops from July, with Gary Davies presenting until then.
  - BBC Radio 4 turns off its medium wave frequencies. They had been used to provide reception on AM where the long wave signal was weak, such as in London, Northern Ireland and in south west England.
- 16 April –
  - Yesterday in Parliament is broadcast on BBC Radio 4 Extra for the first time. The change of station sees the programme move to a new post-9am slot.
  - The BBC is named the 2024 Broadcaster of the Year at the New York Festivals Radio Awards.
- 17 April –
  - Bauer stations Free Radio, Pirate FM, Gem Radio, Hallam FM, Lincs FM, Metro Radio, Pulse 1, Radio City, Rock FM, Signal 1, TFM, Viking FM and The Wave rebrand to Hits Radio. The stations continue to have local breakfast output, but will have networked programming at other times. Local news, advertising and traffic updates will also continue to air. and to promote the change, Bauer launches a television advertising campaign for the Hits Radio network featuring presenters Sam Thompson, Fleur East and Gemma Atkinson.
  - Virgin Radio announces schedule changes following the departure of Graham Norton that will include Angela Scanlon presenting weekend breakfast.
- 18 April –
  - Bauer Media announce plans to rename Liverpool's Radio City Tower as the Hits Radio Tower.
  - Capital Buzz is launched to replace the PopBuzz website.
- 19 April –
  - Ofcom invites applications for the sixth round of the small-scale DAB process.
  - Research carried out by economists at Compass Lexecon indicates BBC radio, and in particular BBC Local Radio, could not survive in its present format under a commercially funded BBC.
- 22 April –
  - Asian Sound Radio is renamed Lyca Radio Greater Manchester following Lyca's acquisition of the station in 2023.
  - Mike Read's Heritage Chart Radio breakfast show begins airing on Brighton's Regency Radio.
  - Deezer and Global Radio sign a deal that makes Global its exclusive ad partner in the UK.
  - Caroline Community Radio is rebranded as Caroline Coastal FM and given an extra FM frequency.
- 23 April – Happy Radio hires Faye Bamford to co-present its weekday drivetime show alongside Ian Roberts.
- 24 April –
  - Ofcom warns radio and television stations with programmes hosted by politicians that they could be fined if they break impartiality rules in the run up to the next general election.
  - Milton Keynes station 1055 The Point is warned by Ofcom it faces a fine for breaching its Key Commitments for a second time.
- 25 April – BFBS announces it will launch a new schedule, with Kam Kelly and Danni G presenting the breakfast show.
- 26 April –
  - Tesco signs a deal to become headline sponsor of Global's The Sports Agents podcast.
  - Radio 2 listeners vote "Dancing Queen" their favourite ABBA song.
- End of April – The last remaining AM transmitter for Gold is switched off in Greater Manchester.

=== May ===
- 1 May –
  - Global confirms that Sangita Myska is to leave LBC as part of a schedule shake up.
  - Sun FM rebrands to Nation Radio North East
  - Sunrise Radio airs an interview its managing director Tony Lit recorded with Prime Minister Rishi Sunak.
  - Bauer Media Audio UK completes its acquisition of SharpStream.
- 2 May –
  - Bauer stages its annual Cash for Kids fundraiser, raising £1,004,030 for the charity, its largest amount to date.
  - Brighton's Regency Radio hires former BBC presenter John Mann to present a show on Monday evenings titled John Mann's Treasure Test.
- 4 May –
  - Richard Allinson takes over as presenter of weekend mid-mornings on Greatest Hits Radio as part of an overhaul of the weekend schedule following Mark Goodier's departure.
  - Vanessa Feltz joins LBC to present a Sunday afternoon show.
- 6 May –
  - Boom Radio marks 60 years of Motown with special programmes presented by Jenni Murray and Len Groat.
  - Girls Aloud singer Kimberley Walsh presents a one-off show for Hits Radio Pride.
- 7 May –
  - Sarah Julian joins BBC Radio WM to present the weekday breakfast show, replacing Rakeem Omar.
  - Ofcom finds Capital Breakfast to be in breach of the Broadcasting Code after the Jason Derulo track "Savage Love" was played during an edition of the programme without the F-word being edited out.
- 8 May – Nation Radio South Coast have hired former Wave 105 presenters Selina Ross and Tony Shepherd to present on the station.
- 13 May – Radio Today reports that BBC Radio 2 and BBC 6 Music will no longer post on Facebook and X in favour of TikTok and Instagram.
- 15 May – Emma Barnett joins the Today programme, co-presenting alongside Amol Rajan.
- 16 May – Bauer Media Audio UK's new headquarters at The Lantern near London's Euston Station is officially opened.
- 20 May –
  - Nihal Arthanayake announces his departure from BBC Radio 5 Live's afternoon show after eight years with the network.
  - Ed Vaizey begins presenting lunchtimes on Times Radio two days a week, sharing the show with Ayesha Hazarika.
- 21 May –
  - BBC Radio 5 Live have hired Times Radio's Matt Chorley to replace Nihal Arthanayake on weekday afternoons.
  - Following an investigation into Bauer's news experiment with Greatest Hits Radio, initiated by a listener complaint, Ofcom reminds Bauer of its local news obligations.
- 24 May –
  - The Media Act 2024 receives Royal assent following its approval by Parliament the previous day.
  - The three-day BBC Radio 1's Big Weekend music festival gets underway in Luton, Bedfordshire.
- 27 May –
  - Shire Sounds Radio is rebranded as Northampton 1.
  - Pat Sharp begins a week of presenting breakfast on Heart 80s, standing in for Simon Beale.
  - BBC Radio 5 Live hires BBC Radio Norfolk's sports presenter Rob Butler to provide sports coverage.
- 28 May – Iain Dale presents his final show for LBC ahead of the general election, announcing his intention to put his name forward as a candidate. He subsequently withdraws from putting his name forward after comments made in a 2022 podcast resurface.
- 31 May – BBC Asian Network counts down a chart of the Ultimate 90s Bollywood Songs. The chart is presented by Nikita Kanda and Haroon Rashid.

=== June ===
- 2 June – Michael Ball takes over as presenter of Radio 2's Sunday Love Songs.
- 3 June –
  - Capital launches the pop-up station Capital (Taylor's Version), to coincide with the UK leg of Taylor Swift's Eras Tour, the first time a radio station in the UK has been dedicated to a single artist.
  - Andrew Neil joins Times Radio to present an afternoon show from Mondays to Thursdays, doing so earlier than his originally planned September start because of the general election.
  - Rewind Radio hires former BBC Radio Cornwall presenter Jack Murley as programme controller and weekday midmorning presenter. The station also appoints Mark Peters, the former managing director of Pirate FM, as AI Integration Specialist.
- 4 June – Capital announces that weekend presenter Kemi Rodgers will cover for Capital Breakfast co-presenter Sian Welby while she is on maternity leave over the summer.
- 6 June – Ronan Keating announces he is leaving Magic Breakfast after co-presenting the show for seven years.
- 7 June –
  - Edinburgh's Edge 1 celebrates Taylor Swift's arrival at Murrayfield with a 12-hour broadcast playing her songs from 6am to 6pm.
  - Former BBC Radio Merseyside presenter Roger Lyon confirms he is joining Liverpool Live Radio to present a Sunday evening show.
- 8–9 June – BBC Radio 4 stages a special weekend of programmes to mark 100 years since the death of Franz Kafka and 75 years since publication of George Orwell's Nineteen Eighty-Four.
- 10 June –
  - Davina McCall begins a two-week cover of Heart Breakfast alongside Jamie Theakston while regular co-presenter Amanda Holden is away filming a TV series.
  - Kevin Duala joins BBC Radio Merseyside to present the weekday breakfast show.
  - Frisk Radio becomes the official partner of the Blyth Live Festival, which takes place on 15 June.
  - Ofcom approves changes to the Key Commitments of B Radio in Farnborough to allow it to appeal to an older audience and drop travel news bulletins from its schedule.
- 14 June –
  - BBC Radio 4 airs the tribute programme There's Only One Michael Mosley following the recent death of television doctor Michael Mosley on the Greek island of Symi.
  - Global have hired Aggie Chambre for the new role of LBC Political Correspondent.
  - Talksport have signed a sponsorship deal with Burger King UK to sponsor their Euro 2024 coverage.
  - A coalition of commercial media and content businesses write to Labour to urge them not to introduce advertising on the BBC, fearing it could have a negative impact on consumers, licence fee payers and creative industries.
  - Among those from the world of radio to be recognised in the 2024 Birthday Honours are BBC executive Jenny Abramsky, who received a Damehood, BBC Wales's Roy Noble, who receives a CBE, and KISS FM founder Gordon Mac, who receives an MBE.
- 16 June – The 2024 Capital Summertime Ball will be held at Wembley Stadium.
- 17 June –
  - BBC Sounds launches an Election 2024 livestream, bringing together all the election news and programming, such as Newscast, Today, Question Time and Sunday with Laura Kuenssberg. The livestream is scheduled to run until 8 July.
  - The UK Community Radio Network publishes a manifesto aimed at garnering support from political parties regarding the future of community radio in the UK.
- 18 June –
  - LBC's Nick Ferrari presents the first of two editions of Britain's Next PM, a phone-in giving listeners the opportunity to speak to Keir Starmer and Rishi Sunak, with Starmer appearing on the first edition and Sunak the following day.
  - During an election debate on BBC Radio 4's Woman's Hour, representatives from Labour, the Liberal Democrats, Greens and Scottish National Party express their support for making misogyny a hate crime.
- 19 June – Specsavers wins the first Grand Prix for Audio & Radio to be awarded to the UK at the Cannes Lions International Festival of Creativity for their "The Misheard Version" advertising campaign.
- 20 June –
  - Heart becomes the official sponsor of the Manchester Pride and Leeds Pride festivals.
  - Gaydio teams up with Warner Music Group to launch Sounds Like Pride, a project for 2024 Pride in London.
- 21 June – Global secures a deal with Team GB to be their official audio partner during the 2024 Summer Olympics.
- 22 June –
  - Tim Smith joins Jazz FM to present their Summer Book Club.
  - Lyca Radio and Lyca Gold host the Hounslow Mela, while in Milton Keynes, Lyca Gold presenters Bali Brahmbhatt and Kajal host India Day Milton Keynes, with both events being covered on air and online.
- 24 June –
  - BBC Radio 4's Today programme announces it has dropped the daily horse racing tips which it has carried for 47 years.
  - Bauer launches Rayo, a new audio platform that enables online listeners to stream 50 Bauer stations.
  - As part of its Analogue Radio Technical Code consultation, Ofcom confirms that AM radio stations will be allowed to offer better audio quality.
- 25 June –
  - James Murray-Walsh is appointed Principal of the Global Academy.
  - LBC's Nick Ferrari moderates an immigration policy debate between Home Secretary James Cleverly and Shadow Home Secretary Yvette Cooper.
- 27 June – Nihal Arthanayake presents his final edition of the weekday afternoon show on BBC Radio 5 Live.
- 28 June – MistaJam is to relinquish his presenting role on The Capital Weekender in exchange for an extra show on Capital Dance.

=== July ===
- 1 July –
  - Radio 1 introduces its summer schedule, which includes extending Breakfast with Greg James until 11am.
  - Rambolds Radio rebrands as Your Skipton.
  - Greatest Hits Radio begins airing Andy Goulding's Midlands afternoon show as a national programme following the departure of Debbie Mac.
  - The UK Hot 40 Countdown is made available to overseas radio stations.
- 3 July –
  - The Newscast All-Dayer launches on BBC Sounds to provide general election coverage.
  - Talksport announces the schedule for its coverage of the 2024 Summer Olympics.
- 4 July –
  - 2024 United Kingdom general election:
    - At 9.45pm, BBC Radio 4 begins its election night coverage presented by Rachel Burden and Nick Robinson with Radio 5 Live simulcasting.
    - At 9.55pm, Matt Chorley begins presenting Times Radio's election night coverage. The programme, which airs until 6.00am on 5 July begins 100 hours of live election coverage, something Times Radio describes as Britain's biggest ever live election programme.
    - At 10pm, Radio News Hub begins an eight-hour live election night broadcast from College Green and presented by Jonathan Charles that will be made available free to its clients.
- 5 July –
  - Following Labour's election victory, Lisa Nandy is appointed as Secretary of State for Culture, Media and Sport, replacing Lucy Frazer.
  - Kem Cetinay joins Capital to present The Capital Weekender.
- 6 July – Mark Goodier takes over as presenter of Pick of the Pops from Gary Davies, who had temporarily replaced Steve Wright, following Wright's death in February.
- 8 July –
  - Nation Broadcasting launches its new Nation Player app.
  - Ofcom finds 15 community radio stations in breach of their regulations for filing late financial reports, or failing to file them at all.
  - Juice Radio in Preston is found to be in breach of its Key Commitments for failing to broadcast any local news and sport.
- 9 July –
  - Ofcom approves the launch of BBC Radio 1 00s and BBC Radio 3 Chill (launched as BBC Radio 3 Unwind) stations on BBC Sounds, but delays approval of a BBC Radio 2 Oldies service after the latest RAJAR figures showed online listening was greater than previously thought and amid concerns of the detrimental impact it could have on its competitors.
  - Community station Radio Leyland is found in breach of its licence for playing the track "Let's Go Fishing" by Aaron Lewis, which contains three instances of the word "fucked", on a Saturday morning in April.
- 11 July – Virgin Radio UK is named as the official radio station for CarFest, Latitude Festival and Hardwick Festival.
- 14 July – After his final show on BBC Radio Jersey, presenter Phil Taylor retires after 35 years in broadcasting.
- 15 July –
  - Boom Radio is reprimanded by Ofcom for playing the uncensored version of "You Oughta Know" by Alanis Morissette during the afternoon school run after receiving two complaints. While Boom accepts it should not have played the song, it argues that 94% of its listeners are over 55, and its "under 18 audience registers as zero".
  - Ofcom finds London's Hayes FM in breach of its key commitments after it failed to produce eight hours or original output a day and 13 hours of locally produced programming.
  - Ofcom finds Hot Radio in breach of its key commitments for the second time in twelve months for failing to meet its key commitments, specifically broadcasting local content about Poole.
  - Gaydio becomes available on DAB+ in Liverpool.
  - My Radio Group launches an hourly travel update service for radio stations.
- 16 July –
  - Bauer Media announces plans to rebrand Scala Radio as Magic Classical and Magic Chilled to Hits Radio Chilled, with the changes taking effect on 16 September.
  - The Radio Today website reports that sports bulletins on GB News Radio are now being powered by Artificial Intelligence and voiced by a virtual newsreader.
- 18 July – Ofcom finds Glasgow community station Revival FM in breach of its regulations for not recording its output.
- 22 July – Jazz FM launches a new summer schedule, which sees new programmes for several of its presenters, but the departure of Lil Koko and Claire Teal.
- 24 July – BBC Radio 1 Relax closes after 3 years of broadcasting, and BBC Radio 4 LW no longer shows up on BBC Sounds, as the schedule carried the same output from BBC Radio 4 FM.
- 28 July – Central Radio acquires online radio station Triple M Radio.
- 29 July – Iain Dale is forced to take time off his LBC evening show after being rushed to hospital with a medical emergency.
- 31 July – Ronan Keating co-presents his final edition of Magic Breakfast.

=== August ===
- 7 August – Bauer announces that Hits Radio will replace KISS on FM in London, Norfolk and the West of England later in the year.
- 9 August –
  - Gaby Roslin presents The Radio 2 Breakfast Show after usual presenter, Zoe Ball, is unexpectedly absent.
  - Singer and television presenter Elin Fflur joins BBC Radio Wales to present a Friday evening music show, which is a replacement for the station's Friday evening sports show.
- 12 August –
  - Scott Mills temporarily takes over as presenter of The Radio 2 Breakfast Show while Zoe Ball takes a break for a few weeks.
  - Rob Bonnet presents his final sports news bulletin for the Today programme on BBC Radio 4 in his last broadcast after around 47 years with the BBC.
- 13 August – Absolute Radio announces that it has signed up comedian Jon Richardson to present a Saturday morning show from September.
- 16 August – Reality television star Abbie Holborn joins Frisk Radio to present Out with Abbie, a weekly Friday night club music show.
- 21 August –
  - BBC Radio presenter Lauren Laverne reveals that she is being treated in hospital for cancer.
  - Ofcom finds Radio Wyvern in breach of its Key Commitment for not airing enough distinctive programming for its target audience. Apart from its breakfast show, the station, aimed at those aged 11 to 25, was not airing enough content aimed at its listener demographic.
- 25 August – Jenni Costello co-presents a special edition of her Yacht Rock show with Katie Puckrik on Solid Gold Gem. The show also airs the following day on Sussex station More Radio Retro.
- 26 August –
  - BBC Radio 1 celebrates the 25th anniversary of the Live Lounge with the top 25 performances from the series as voted for by its presenters. In top place is Amy Winehouse's 2007 cover of "Valerie", a song originally recorded by the Zutons.
  - BBC Radio 2 airs a six-hour tribute to Steve Wright on what would have been his 70th birthday. The three shows are presented by Vernon Kay, Liza Tarbuck and Paul Gambaccini.
  - Classic FM listeners have voted Howard Shore's score to The Lord of the Rings trilogy their favourite musical score in the 2024 Classic FM Movie Music Hall of Fame.
- 27 August – Nation 90s holds an "Oasis Day" to coincide with the band's announcement at 8am that it is re-forming.

=== September ===
- 2 September – Sian Welby returns to Capital Breakfast following her maternity leave.
- 2–6 September – BBC Radio 2 presenters Jo Whiley, Scott Mills, Trevor Nelson, Vernon Kay and Sara Cox take part in a CBeebies Bedtime Stories takeover.
- 4 September – Les Ross returns to BRMB to celebrate the first anniversary of its relaunch. He will also return to present Les Ross in the Morning on weekdays from late September.
- 5 September – Jo Whiley broadcasts her evening show from The Ferret, a music club in Preston, ahead of Radio 2 in the Park.
- 7–8 September – The 2024 Radio 2 in the Park event is scheduled to take place in Preston. The event helps to generate £5m for the local economy, in terms of visitor spending, job creation and support for local business.
- 9 September –
  - Garry Richardson presents his final sports news bulletin for the Today programme, exactly 50 years to the day that he started working for the BBC.
  - Hugo Rifkind is scheduled to replace Matt Chorley as weekday mid-morning presenter on Times Radio.
  - Fleur East returns to Hits Radio Breakfast following her maternity leave.
- 12 September – Global launches 12 new radio stations, all sister stations to its existing networks, with the new stations appearing on DAB and online. They include Capital Anthems and Smooth 80s, which broadcast on the semi-national Sound Digital multiplex, with the other stations broadcasting on digital multiplexes in London. The stations also include a relaunch of Smooth 70s and the first sister stations for Classic FM.
- 16 September –
  - West FM is rebranded as Clyde 1 Ayrshire.
  - Bauer Media rebrands Scala Radio as Magic Classical and Magic Chilled to Hits Radio Chilled, as announced 2 months earlier.
  - Muff Murfin presents an evening show on BRMB, the first time he has presented a show on air.
- 17 September – Heart Breakfast co-presenter Jamie Theakston announces that he has been diagnosed with stage one laryngeal cancer after undergoing a biopsy, and that he has had surgery to remove a lesion, while his prognosis is good.
- 18 September – The BBC and Nation Radio agree a deal to make BBC podcasts available on Nation Radio's mobile app.
- 20 September – BBC Radio 1 airs Europe's Biggest Dance Show 2024 along with radio stations from 10 other countries.
- 22 September – Hits Radio replaces Kiss on FM in London, Norwich and the West of England. Consequently, Kiss no longer broadcasts on FM.
- 23 September –
  - Zoe Ball returns to The Radio 2 Breakfast Show six weeks after going on a temporary break from presenting the show.
  - Ofcom finds LBC to be in breach of its broadcasting regulations after presenter Tom Swarbrick failed to mention all candidates standing in the 2024 London mayoral election during a series of programmes about the election.
- 24 September – Stephanie Peacock, the Minister for Sport, Media, Civil Society and Youth, confirms plans for new measures in the Media Act to support the radio sector.
- 25 September – Global relaunches Heart Xmas on DAB and Smooth Christmas on Global Player.
- 27 September – Bauer ends its local Greatest Hits Radio programming for Cumbria as its offices in Carlisle are closed. The local programme is replaced by a regionally networked programme, airing from Liverpool.
- 30 September – Radio Tircoed rebrands and relaunches as SA Radio Live. The station had originally intended to rebrand as Swansea Live Radio, but changed its plans after complaints from rival broadcasters.

=== October ===
- 1 October –
  - Jordan Hemingway, a former producer of The Radio 2 Breakfast Show, is appointed Deputy Managing Editor of Heart.
  - Christmas Radio returns to DAB in Portsmouth.
- 2 October –
  - Gold and Radio X are added to DAB in the Channel Islands.
  - Figures published by Nielsen Research indicate that Fix Radio has around half a million weekly listeners.
- 5 October –
  - Johnnie Walker announces he will retire from broadcasting because of ill health, and will step down from presenting Radio 2's Sounds of the 70s and The Rock Show at the end of the month.
  - Voiceover artist Emma Clarke joins BBC Radio 3 as their Saturday Breakfast presenter.
- 10 October – BBC Radio 5 Live agrees a deal to air audio coverage of the rugby union 2024 and 2025 Autumn Internationals.
- 11 October –
  - Global Radio holds its annual Make Some Noise Day, raising £3.8m for charity.
  - Lyca Radio expands its coverage as it launches in Leicester.
  - Lorna Clarke, Director of BBC Music, is presented with Music Week's Outstanding Contribution Award at an event in London.
- 12 October – Carol Vorderman announces she is leaving her Sunday show on LBC after a recent health scare that required her to spend a night in hospital.
- 14 October – Talksport 2 agrees a deal with Sports Entertainment New Zealand to air exclusive coverage of India's test series with New Zealand.
- 15 October – The BBC announces further job cuts to its radio newsroom, affecting BBC Asian Network and BBC Radio 5 Live.
- 18 October – Times Radio's YouTube channel reaches a million subscribers.
- 21 October –
  - Large sections of the Media Act 2024 relating to commercial radio come into law, allowing operators to make changes to their output.
  - Classic FM holds a concert at the Royal Albert Hall celebrating classical music from the British Isles.
  - Christian radio station Radio Maria expands its coverage after joining DAB+ in Peterborough, Norwich and King's Lynn.
- 22 October – Ofcom begins awarding Round 6 of the small-scale DAB licences.
- 23 October –
  - Chris Evans announces that his breakfast show has agreed a sponsorship deal with the National Lottery.
  - Mark Wogan, the son of broadcaster Terry Wogan, is hired by Virgin Radio to provide cover on Virgin Radio Chilled.
- 25 October –
  - Johnnie Walker presents his final edition of Radio 2's The Rock Show.
  - The final day of mid-morning local programming takes place on Hits Radio after Bauer decides to fully network the station outside of breakfast following changes in legislation.
- 27 October – Johnnie Walker presents his final edition of Radio 2's Sounds of the 70s. The show includes a guest appearance from his wife, Tiggy.
- 28 October –
  - Hits Radio becomes fully networked with a new mid-morning show. It is presented by Scott Clarke for the first week, followed by regular presenter Tom Green, who takes over from 4 November.
  - Bauer Radio announces it is vacating Liverpool's St John's Beacon, home of Radio City for many years.
- 30 October – Magic Radio confirms that Gok Wan will co-present Magic Breakfast alongside Harriet Scott from Monday 27 January 2025.
- 31 October –
  - The final day of local programming on Greatest Hits Radio following Bauer's decision to fully network the station.
  - LBC News closes down its 1152 kHz medium wave frequency at 3:00:32 pm after broadcasting a retune loop from 30 October at 10:00 am onwards, which redirected listeners to retune to DAB or online services.

=== November ===
- 1 November –
  - Greatest Hits Radio becomes fully networked with a new weekday afternoon show. It is presented by Andy Gould until 8 November, with regular presenter Kate Thornton taking over from 11 November.
  - LBC confirms that Vanessa Feltz will replace Carol Vorderman as presenter of the Sunday afternoon show.
  - Prince Akwasi, a former radio personality from Ghana, joins BRMB to present a soul and R'n'B show on Friday nights, having secured the job after visiting the station and expressing his admiration for Les Ross.
- 3 November – Bob Harris succeeds Johnnie Walker as presenter of Radio 2's Sounds of the 70s.
- 4 November – Spark Radio, the station run by students at Southport College and King George V Sixth Form College, is launched on DAB.
- 5 November
  - Times Radio breakfast co-presenter Aasmah Mir announces her departure from the programme; she will leave at the end of January 2025.
  - BBC Radio 4, BBC Radio 5 Live, LBC and Times Radio all broadcast coverage of the 2024 United States presidential election.
- 6 November –
  - Bauer have hired Nicki Chapman to present Mellow Magic on Magic Radio on weekday evenings. She will replace Lynn Parsons, who moves to weekends.
  - Status Quo's Francis Rossi becomes patron of Radio Caroline's Ross Revenge charity.
  - Online station Pure West Radio launches on DAB in North and South Pembrokeshire.
- 7 November – Hits Radio have hired Kimberly Wyatt to present the Hits Radio Throwback Show on Sunday evenings.
- 11 November – Radio X is rebranded as Radio Y for the day to promote the television series Yellowstone.
- 13 November – Magic Radio have hired Mel Giedroyc to present a Sunday morning show from Sunday 12 January 2025.
- 14 November – Myles Smith wins the 2024 BBC Introducing Artist of the Year Award.
- 15 November –
  - Zetland FM, Surrey Hills Community Radio, Somer Valley FM, Switch Radio, CareSound Radio and Hospital Radio Perth are all announced as recipients of The King's Award for Voluntary Service.
  - Inti Paolucci is appointed as president of Radio Maria England, replacing Charles Wilson who has occupied the role since 2019.
- 19 November –
  - Zoe Ball announces her departure from The Radio 2 Breakfast Show after six years as its presenter, with her final day on air being Friday 20 December. Ball confirms she will stay with Radio 2, but wishes to devote more time to her family. She confirms that Scott Mills will succeed her as presenter of The Radio 2 Breakfast Show. Radio 2 subsequently announces that Trevor Nelson will replace Mills as afternoon presenter, while Nelson's 10pm–12am Monday to Thursday slot will be taken over by DJ Spoony.
  - Global holds its annual Make Some Noise Night; the event raises £1,282,976 for charity.
- 20 November – Fix Radio have hired Andy Shier, formerly of Wave 105, as their new programme controller.
- 21 November –
  - The BBC submits revised proposals for its Radio 2 and Radio 5 Live extension stations following a public consultation. The Radio 2 spin-off plans are criticised by Phil Riley, CEO of Boom Radio, after the BBC concedes the proposed station would impact Boom financially.
  - Easy Radio South extends its DAB coverage to include Dorset.
- 22 November –
  - Shahlaa Tahira is appointed Director of Industry Partnerships and Careers at the Global Academy.
  - Radio News Hub hires Ricky Durkin as Head of Content and Dave McMullan as News Editor.
- 24 November –
  - Presenter Lauren Laverne reveals she has been given the "all clear" following cancer treatment.
  - Greatest Hits Radio Live takes place at Manchester's Co-op Live arena, and featuring Ken Bruce, Martin Kemp, Jenny Powell and Kate Thornton.
- 25 November –
  - York Hospital Radio joins DAB in York, the first time the station can be heard outside the hospital environment.
  - The National Union of Journalists reiterates its opposition to the BBC's plans for two new digital radio stations, noting that a third of its local output has been lost.
- 27 November – Today presenter Mishal Husain announces she is leaving the BBC in the new year to join Bloomberg; her last stint on Today is on 17 December.
- 28 November – Equipment is stolen from the premises of Oxford community station First FM, leaving it unable to broadcast.
- 30 November – Ofcom rules that the BBC broke the rules of its operating licence by cutting back on news programmes on Northern Ireland's BBC Radio Foyle.

=== December ===
- 1 December – The presenters of The News Agents podcast host a live event at the Royal Albert Hall titled The News Agents Live On Stage.
- 2 December – Talksport have applied to switch off seven of their 18 transmitters subject to Ofcom approval, reducing their mediumwave coverage from 92% to 88%.
- 3 December –
  - Ofcom awards small-scale DAB licences for Halifax, Huddersfield, South Craven, Sunderland and Wigan.
  - Seahaven FM East Sussex announces plans to close on 10 January 2025 due to lack of funding.
- 5 December – Hits Radio have hired Will Best to present a Sunday morning show from 12 January 2025.
- 6 December – Sean Rafferty presents BBC Radio 3's drive time classical music programme In Tune for the final time, after 27 years in the presenter's chair.
- 7 December – Cambridge 105 Radio rebrands as Cambridge Radio.
- 9 December – Nation Broadcasting announces it is switching off four of its FM transmitters, two in Scotland and two in Wales.
- 12 December – Boom Radio unveils a new package of jingles produced by TM Studios, along with a station song.
- 13 December –
  - A BBC World Service investigation into Steven Bartlett's Diary of a CEO suggests the podcast is amplifying harmful medical misinformation by not sufficiently questioning health claims that go against conventional scientific evidence.
  - Access All Aerials (AAA), an Exeter-based community radio station for disabled people, is granted a DAB+ licence, making it the first disability broadcaster to go fully digital.
- 14 December – Anne Marie McAleese announces she is leaving BBC Radio Ulster's Your Place And Mine, which she has presented since 1991, and will present the final show on Saturday 15 February 2025.
- 18 December –
  - East Sussex community station Seahaven FM, which announced it would close on 10 January due to lack of funding, is saved from closure after receiving further financial support.
  - The BBC World Service announces it will begin broadcasting an enhanced services to listeners across Syria as local media and digital services are disrupted following the fall of the Assad regime.
- 19 December –
  - Virgin Radio hires Tim Vernon as its Music Producer following his departure from Bauer.
  - Ofcom writes to BBC Radio 2 to give notice that it intends to conduct a full competition assessment into its expansion plans.
  - DC Thomson announces it will absorb Kingdom FM into Original 106, giving the company one radio brand across Aberdeen, Fife and Tayside.
- 20 December –
  - Zoe Ball presents her final edition of The Radio 2 Breakfast Show after six years.
  - Anna Jameson presents her final edition of BBC Radio Manchester's breakfast show, having decided to leave the programme after two and a half years.
  - Rick Jackson presents the final Greatest Hits Radio regional breakfast show on Greatest Hits Radio South. Shortly afterwards BBC Radio Solent announces he will present their afternoon show in the new year.
- 22 December –
  - Gareth Southgate appears as a guest on Radio 4's Desert Island Discs, where he discusses his decision to step down as manager of the England national football team, saying he made the decision to leave before the end of Euro 2024.
  - An eleven-year-old girl, who is blind and has a brain tumour, fulfils her dream of becoming a radio presenter after BBC Three Counties Radio gives her the chance to present an on-air show.
- 23 December –
  - James Corden and Ruth Jones present a Gavin and Stacey takeover of The Radio 2 Breakfast Show.
  - Greatest Hits Radio South begins simulcasting Greatest Hits Radio's national breakfast programme.
  - Talksport secures the radio rights to UEFA Women's Euro 2025.
- 25 December –
  - Singer Mariah Carey makes her presenting debut on Radio 2 with an hour-long show playing some of her favourite Christmas hits.
  - On Boom Radio, Nicky Horne presents a two-hour tribute to his friend, Kenny Everett, on what would have been Everett's 80th birthday.
- 26 December – Gaydio airs a series of programmes throughout Boxing Day featuring some of the UK's biggest LGBTQ+ podcasts.
- 28 December
  - Pope Francis delivers Radio 4's Thought for the Day in which he urges people to embrace "a world full of hope and kindness".
  - After a seven decade career presenting on British radio, Sarah Ward presents her final edition of The Sarah Ward Collection for Jazz FM, having decided to step back from presenting the show.
  - BBC Radio 4 Extra schedules a selection of programmes originally broadcast in December 1964 on the BBC Home Service.
  - BBC Radio 4 Extra also plays a long lost interview Kenny Everett did with John Lennon.
- 29 December – Adil Ray joins Smooth Radio to present the first of three shows over the festive period.
- 30 December –
  - 2025 New Year Honours: Presenter Myleene Klass is among those from the world of radio to be recognised in the New Year Honours after receiving an MBE. Others to receive honours include Alan Titchmarsh (CBE), Steve Lamacq (MBE) and Hugo Duncan (MBE).
  - On Boom Radio, Rob Jones presents a tribute to Radio Luxembourg on the 32nd anniversary of the station's closure.

== Station debuts ==
=== Terrestrial ===
- 1 January – Bournemouth One
- 8 January – Smooth Relax
- 14 February – Boom Rock
- 1 March – Angel Radio + 1
- 9 April – The Voice 2
- 15 April –
  - CRFM
  - Devoncast Radio
- 1 May – Eirewave
- 26 May – Coast Radio
- 3 June – Capital (Taylor's Version)
- 24 June – Atlantic 252 (relaunch)
- July – Your Ilkley
- 12 September –
  - Capital Anthems
  - Classic FM Calm
  - Classic FM Movies
  - Heart 10s
  - Heart Love
  - Heart Musicals
  - Radio X Chilled
  - Radio X 90s
  - Radio X 00s
  - Smooth 70s (relaunched)
  - Smooth 80s
  - Smooth Soul
- 16 September
  - Greatest Hits Radio 60s
  - Hits Radio Chilled
  - Magic Classical
- 1 October – Nation Classic Hits
- 5 October – Purbeck Sound
- 1 November –
  - Frisk Bounce
  - GLOW Radio
- 2 December – Nifty Radio
- 12 December – Pure X-Mas

=== Online ===
- 1 January – Dance Anthems Radio, a station playing dance anthems from the 1990s and 2000s.
- January – Laser 558 (relaunch)
- 13 February – Absolute Radio Sisters
- 14 February – Greatest Hits Radio Love
- 12 March – Past Perfect Radio
- May – North East Scotland Radio
- 8 June – Fun Kids Space Station
- 1 July – Manx Radio Gold
- 28 September – Radio Big Sky
- September – Caravan Radio
- 4 November – BBC Radio 3 Unwind
- 8 November – BBC Radio 1 Anthems
- Unknown – HGV Radio

== Small-scale multiplex switch-ons ==
- 11 March – South Shropshire
- 16 July – Newry, Armagh, and Down
- 18 October – South Gloucestershire

== Programme debuts ==
- 15 January – Your Green Breakfast with Xan Phillips on Voice FM 103.9.
- 18 January – The EFL Fan Network Show, a weekly show and podcast on Talksport 2.
- 23 January – Icklewick FM presented by The Delightful Sausage on BBC Radio 4.
- 2 February – Review of the Week presented by David Prever, a weekly programme available from Radio News Hub.
- 16 March – Doc Brown's Vinyl Hour, a five-part series on Jazz FM.
- 24 March – Carry On: An Evening with Mark and Lard, a one-off show presented by Mark Radcliffe and Marc Riley, on Live to Your Living Room.
- 29 March – Clash of the Pirates with Johnnie Walker and Tony Blackburn, a one-off programme celebrating 60 years since the launch of pirate radio, on BBC Radio 2.
- 1 April –
  - BBC Radio 1Xtra's Comedy Gala with Eddie Kadi & Friends on BBC Sounds (the programme will also air on BBC iPlayer and BBC One).
  - Round Midnight, a weekday night jazz programme presented by Soweto Kinch on BBC Radio 3.
- 5 April – Notes from Italy with Freddie De Tommaso, a six-part series looking at the classical music of Italy, on Classic FM.
- 7 April – ABBA – The 50 Year Voyage, presented by Sir Tim Rice, on Boom Radio.
- 14 April – The UK Country Radio Airplay Chart on Absolute Radio Country
- 17 April – One More Chai, a chat show presented by SMASHBengali and Guranisha Randhawa, on BBC Asian Network.
- 5 May – Sunday with Lewis Goodall, a politics orientated programme presented by Lewis Goodall, on LBC.
- 2 June –
  - Love Songs with Michael Ball on BBC Radio 2.
  - Radio 2's The Week-est Link.
- 12 July – Perfect Pitch, a nine part series looking at the pieces of classical music that have provided the soundtrack to notable sporting moments, on Classic FM.
- 25 July – Launch of a 30-minute weekly health related programme presented by Dr Hilary Jones, available from Radio News Hub.
- 16 August – Out with Abbie, a weekly show dedicated to club music, on Frisk Radio.
- 7 September – Ken Bruce on Drums, a four-part weekly series looking at the role of the jazz drummer, with Ken Bruce, on Jazz FM.
- 20 September – Classic FM's Race to Antarctica, a four-part series presented by Sue Perkins, on Classic FM.
- 1 October – Punt and Dennis: Routemasters on BBC Radio 4.
- 10 October – A Space to Speak Your Mind, a programme for World Mental Health Day, on BRMB.
- 29 December – Matt Hallsworth, on BBC Radio 1.

== Podcast debuts ==
- 7 January – Gangster Presents... Catching the Kingpins, a series presented by Mobeen Azhar and looking at how police infiltrated the EncroChat phone network on BBC Sounds and BBC Radio 4.
- 5 March – The Sports Agents with Gabby Logan and Mark Chapman on Global Player.
- 3 June – The Football Authorities with Clive Tyldesley and Martin O'Neill on Global Player.
- 3 October –
  - Never Mind My Bollocks, a podcast discussing the process of vasectomy, produced by Made in Manchester. (reported as available on this date)
  - The Tech Podcast from The Times, a podcast discussing technology with Katie Prescott and Danny Fortson, from The Times.
- 11 October – Frank Skinner Off The Radio.
- 4 November – In Detail: The Pub Bombings, a 12-part series looking at the impact of the 1974 Birmingham pub bombings on those affected by the attack, on BBC Sounds and BBC Radio WM.
- 7 November – Routes, a travel podcast presented by Clara Amfo, from LNER.

== Publications ==
- 19 July – David Hamilton's Long and Winding Road by David Hamilton.

== Continuing radio programmes ==
These programmes are still running as of 2024. They are listed by the year they were first broadcast.

=== 1940s ===
- Desert Island Discs (started 1942)
- Woman's Hour (started 1946)
- A Book at Bedtime (started 1949)

=== 1950s ===
- The Archers (started 1950)
- Pick of the Pops (started 1955)
- The Today Programme (started 1957)

=== 1960s ===
- Farming Today (started 1960)
- In Touch (started 1961)
- The World at One (started 1965)
- The Official Chart (started 1967)
- Just a Minute (started 1967)
- The Living World (started 1968)

=== 1970s ===
- PM (started 1970)
- Start the Week (started 1970)
- You and Yours (started 1970)
- I'm Sorry I Haven't a Clue (started 1972)
- Good Morning Scotland (started 1973)
- Newsbeat (started 1973)
- File on 4 (started 1977)
- Money Box (started 1977)
- The News Quiz (started 1977)
- Feedback (started 1979)
- The Food Programme (started 1979)
- Science in Action (started 1979)

=== 1980s ===
- In Business (started 1983)
- Sounds of the 60s (started 1983)
- Loose Ends (started 1986)

=== 1990s ===
- The Moral Maze (started 1990)
- Essential Selection (started 1991)
- Night Waves (started 1992)
- Essential Mix (started 1993)
- Up All Night (started 1994)
- Wake Up to Money (started 1994)
- Private Passions (started 1995)
- In Our Time (started 1998)
- PopMaster (started 1998)
- The Now Show (started 1998)

=== 2000s ===
- BBC Radio 2 Folk Awards (started 2000)
- Big John @ Breakfast (started 2000)
- Sounds of the 70s (2000–2008, resumed 2009)
- Dead Ringers (2000–2007, resumed 2014)
- A Kist o Wurds (started 2002)
- Fighting Talk (started 2003)
- Jeremy Vine (started 2003)
- The Chris Moyles Show (2004–2012, resumed 2015)
- Elaine Paige on Sunday (started 2004)
- The Bottom Line (started 2006)
- The Unbelievable Truth (started 2006)
- Radcliffe & Maconie (started 2007)
- The Media Show (started 2008)
- Newsjack (started 2009)

=== 2010s ===
- The Third Degree (started 2011)
- BBC Radio 1's Dance Anthems (started 2012)
- Sounds of the 80s (started 2013)
- Question Time Extra Time (started 2013)
- The Show What You Wrote (started 2013)
- Inside Science (started 2013)
- Friday Sports Panel (started 2014)
- Stumped (started 2015)
- You, Me and the Big C (started 2018)
- Radio 1's Party Anthems (started 2019)

=== 2020s ===
- Frank Skinner's Poetry Podcast (started 2020)
- Newscast (started 2020)
- Sounds of the 90s (started 2020)
- Life Changes (started 2021)
- Romesh Ranganathan: For The Love of Hip Hop (started 2021)
- The News Agents (started 2022)
- Ten to the Top (started 2023)

== Ending this year ==
- 11 February – Steve Wright's Sunday Love Songs (1996–2024)
- 28 March – Law in Action (1984–2024)
- 20 December – The Zoe Ball Breakfast Show (2019–2024)

== Closing this year ==
- 15 February – Purbeck Coast FM (2017)
- March –
  - Carillon Wellbeing Radio
  - Hermitage FM (2009)
- 31 March – BBC Radio 4 Longwave (1978) as a separate schedule. It was identical to the FM channel until 24 July when Radio 4 LW got removed from BBC Sounds.
- 24 July – BBC Radio 1 Relax (2021)
- June – Siren Radio (1996)
- 31 August – Amber Radio (2023)
- 6 September – Skyline Gold (2004)
- 30 October – LBC News on medium wave (1994)
- 31 December – Pure X-Mas

== Deaths ==
- 11 January – Annie Nightingale, 83, broadcaster (BBC Radio 1)
- 18 January – Simon Peel, 54, broadcaster (Gaydio)
- 24 January – John Kennedy, radio presenter (194 Radio City, Magic 1548) (death announced on this date)
- 26 January – Walter Love, 88, Northern Irish broadcaster (BBC Radio Ulster)
- 29 January – Martin Reay, broadcaster and technician (CFM) (death announced on this date)
- 12 February – Steve Wright, 69, English disc jockey and radio personality (Steve Wright in the Afternoon, Steve Wright's Sunday Love Songs, Pick of the Pops), ruptured ulcer
- 8 March – Andrew Turner, broadcaster (BBC Radio 1, Atlantic 252, Capital Radio)
- 31 March – Paul Chantler, 64, radio executive
- 30 April – Wally Scott, broadcaster (Radio Merseyside)
- 1 May – Andy Freeman, broadcaster and voiceover artist (Bay Radio, BBC Radio Solent, Wessex FM) (death announced on this date)
- 4 May – Brian Moore, 52, presenter (Metro Radio, Rock FM)
- 29 May – Neil Roy, 80, sports reporter, commentator and journalist (death reported on this day)
- 8 June – Peter Kerridge, chief executive of Premier Radio
- 25 June – Damien 'Doc' Atherton, 50, broadcaster and director (Academy FM Thanet) (death reported on this date)
- 27 June – James Phillips, presenter (National Prison Radio) (death reported on this date)
- 4 July – Ysanne Churchman, 99, English actress (The Archers)
- 26 July – John Bennett, 82, Northern Irish broadcaster (BBC Northern Ireland)
- 12 August – Tony Wyn Jones, founder and chairman of Môn FM (death reported on this date)
- 13 August – Chris Thame, broadcast and resources manager at BATCAM and former engineer at News UK
- 25 August – Dave Foster, radio presenter (Radio Caroline)
- 31 August – Phil Swern, 76, English radio producer (Sounds of the 60s, Pick of the Pops)
- 12 September – Carl Kingston, broadcaster (Radio Aire, Magic Radio, Radio Caroline) (death announced on this date)
- 18 October – Kevin Gover, broadcaster and journalist (Ocean Sound, BBC Wiltshire Sound, Spire FM, Wessex FM, Win FM, Dream 107.2, IRN, ITN, Sky News) (death reported on this date)
- 31 October – Candy Devine, 85, Australian radio broadcaster (Downtown Radio) and singer (death announced on this date)
- 8 November – June Spencer, 105, English actress (The Archers)
- 16 November – Howard Hughes, British podcaster, radio presenter and journalist (BBC Radio Berkshire, Capital London). (death announced on this date)
- 19 December – Wincey Willis, 76, English broadcaster (BBC Hereford & Worcester)
- 31 December – Johnnie Walker, 79, English DJ (Radio Caroline, BBC Radio 1, BBC Radio 2, Sounds of the 60s, Sounds of the 70s, Clash of the Pirates), lung disease.

== See also ==
- 2024 in the United Kingdom
- 2024 in British music
- 2024 in British television
- List of British films of 2024
