= The Bald Builders Breakfast =

- Genre: Music, chat
- Running time: 180 minutes (6:00 am – 9:00 am)
- Country of origin: United Kingdom
- Language: English
- Home station: Fix Radio
- Hosted by: The Bald Builders
- Produced by: Jack Edwards, Travis Glossop, Demi Bell
- Original release: 25th April 2022
- Website: The Bald Builders Breakfast
- Podcast: The Bald Builders Breakfast

The Bald Builders Breakfast is a British radio programme broadcast on Fix Radio, a national station dedicated to the building and construction trades. The show, which airs five days a week from 6:00 AM to 9:00 AM, is presented by the British presenting duo, The Bald Builders, comprising Brad Hanson and Sam Hughes. It is aimed at a target audience of tradespeople across the UK.

== History ==
The presenting duo, Brad Hanson and Sam Hughes, initially joined Fix Radio in July 2020 to host their first programme, "The Bald Brunch." which aired on Fridays from 11:00 AM to 1:00 PM, and was promoted as a way for tradespeople to celebrate "downing tools" as they headed into the weekend.

The Bald Builders Breakfast launched on April 25, 2022. The launch was a key part of Fix Radio's expansion strategy, as the station transitioned from being a regional broadcaster (in London and Manchester) to a national station on DAB digital radio, which commenced a week later on May 3, 2022. The new breakfast show was sponsored by the brand Toupret as the official launch partner.

Following its move to a national broadcast, the show's popularity grew significantly. In late 2022, the hosts' website reported that the breakfast show and Fix Radio had increased their audience reach by 80% since going national. 2023, the show's weekly audience of tradespeople had reached nearly 300,000. As of November 2025, the show reaches over 860,000 tradespeople every week.

== Format and features ==
The Bald Builders Breakfast follows a typical music and chat format for a breakfast show, with a focus on entertaining tradespeople and encouraging listener interaction.

The show's news segment integrates Sky News bulletins with the station's in-house news offering. In 2025, sports broadcaster Jonny Gould joined the station to provide hourly sports bulletins during the daytime schedule.

Key features of the programme include:

- Let's Get You Talking: A daily question posed to the audience to encourage text and voice note interaction with Hanson and Hughes.
- Joke of the Week: A Friday segment where listeners submit jokes, with a weekly winner crowned. Jokes unsuitable for radio are sometimes aired exclusively on the show's podcast version.
- Producer Trav's Movie Reviews: Senior Producer Travis Glossop regularly reviews films on the show.

== Social impact ==
The programme has used its platform to run social initiatives and highlight small businesses within the trade industry and local communities. Their "Café of the Year" competition encouraged listeners to nominate and vote for their favourite builder's café, with the winner crowned nationally.

The presenters have also promoted public health campaigns, such as the Public Health England Better Health Campaign.

== Team ==
The core team supporting the presenters includes:

- Jack Edwards – Executive Producer (also presenter of "Early Doors" on Fix Radio)
- Travis Glossop – Senior Producer
- Demi Bell – Assistant Producer
- Brogan Hubber – Music Director
- Toby Penman – Cover Assistant Producer

== Stand-in presenters ==
The main hosts are covered by other Fix Radio personalities, including:

- Trevor Marshall and Rich Smith (Presenters of the "Down Tools" Drive Show)
- Jack Edwards (Executive Producer and presenter of "Early Doors")
- Travis Glossop (Senior Producer)

== Awards and nominations ==
Awards and Nominations for The Bald Builders Breakfast
Year	Work	Award	Category	Result	Ref
2023	The Bald Builders Breakfast	Audio and Radio Industry Awards (ARIAS)	Best New Radio Show	Nominated	
2023	Ultimate Builders Portaloo (Show segment)	Loo of the Year Award	Building and Construction	Won	
2025	The Bald Builders Breakfast	The Audio Production Awards (THE APA'S)	Best Entertainment	Gold	
