= Independent Radio News =

British radio news service

Coordinates: 51.5161°N 0.1385°W

Independent Radio News provides a service of news bulletins, audio and copy to commercial radio stations in the United Kingdom and beyond. The managing director, Tim Molloy, succeeded long-term MD John Perkins in November 2009. Perkins had been MD of IRN since 1989. IRN's shareholders are Global (54.6%), Bauer Radio (22.3%), ITN (19.7%) and News Broadcasting (3.4%).

== History and background ==
IRN launched on 8 October 1973, with the first bulletin read at 06:00 by Australian newsreader Ken Guy on the opening morning of Britain's first commercial radio station, LBC. IRN was based at LBC studios in Gough Square, just off Fleet Street in Central London. The service was funded by cash payments from subscribing radio stations. On 5 October 1992, ITN took over the running of the IRN operation from LBC and IRN relocated into ITN's headquarters on Gray's Inn Road in London.

Until the early 1990s, stations took the hourly bulletins by opting into LBC's normal broadcast output. One second of silence was provided before and after the bulletins on LBC to allow stations to opt in and out.

Computer technology was introduced in 1985 and in 1987, the Newslink advertising scheme (a national single advertisement, broadcast by IRN immediately adjacent to the news bulletin) was launched which funded the service and provided cash dividends of the surplus to client stations. Newslink adverts are broadcast by client stations around weekday bulletins from 06:00 to 11:00 and 13:00, and at weekends between 07:00 and 12:00. Sales of Newslink commercial spots are managed by Global.

In 1989, satellite distribution of bulletins and audio was introduced, and this was also the year that IRN and LBC moved into new studios on Hammersmith Road in West London. The satellite service was managed by Satellite Media Services who were based on the ground floor of Euston Tower. In 1991, the Sunrise Radio IRN service was introduced. The hourly news bulletins were broadcast on Sunrise Radio's channel on the Astra satellite, in a move designed to serve smaller commercial, RSL and hospital stations who struggled to afford the expensive standard IRN satellite equipment. This continued until 31 August 2004, upon which the service moved to a dedicated channel on the Hot Bird 4 satellite at 13.0° East. From March 2009, bulletins are broadcast via the main Sky Digital Astra satellite at 28.2° East.

In 2001, audio cuts began to be distributed via the Internet and from 2 October 2005, audio cuts and packages ceased being distributed via the satellite audio channels and switched entirely to the IRN Net Newsroom Internet system.

IRN bulletins had a major overhaul in September 2002. The bulletin outcue for many years, "Independent Radio News", was dropped and all bulletins were of three minutes duration. All IRN branding was removed, and the outcue reverted to a time check: "It's three minutes past [the hour]." The three-minute bulletin, known as IRN 180, was broadcast on the IRN1 channel and the Astra (Sunrise Radio) feed 24 hours a day, 7 days a week. A shorter 90-second bulletin, known as IRN 90, was introduced on the IRN2 channel comprising stories aimed at younger, pop music stations. This was broadcast on the hour from 19:00 to 06:00 on weekdays, and from 14:00 to 06:00 at weekends. This replaced the previous 60-second overnight bulletin service.

IRN launched its first bespoke bulletin service in September 2003, with an hourly bulletin service for Magic 105.4 and a breakfast news service for Kiss 100.

On 1 October 2003, satellite distribution of the main IRN service switched from SMS and the Intelsat 707 satellite at 1.0° West to Kingston Communications and the Sirius 4 satellite at 4.8° East.

On 1 January 2021, the service was switched to Eutelsat 9B satellite at 9.0° East.

The existing Astra and Eutelsat services ceased on 1 October 2024 and distribution switched to a single channel on Astra 2E at 28.2° East.

The main IRN1 channel is broadcast via the left channel with the additional IRN2 channel broadcast via the right channel.

In June 2008, IRN started supplying a feed of news, sport and entertainment stories and video to the websites of client radio stations.

During the ITN era, most audio came from ITV News and Channel 4 News television bulletins. Client stations contributed audio to the service and IRN also had agreements to use audio from CNN Radio and Sky Sports News. On 15 October 2008, IRN announced that Sky News Radio was to replace ITN as its contracted news supplier from March 2009 on a three-year contract. The final ITN-produced bulletin was broadcast at 13:00 on Tuesday 2 March 2009 and was read by Moira Alderson. The bulletin finished: "... From ITN this is Independent Radio News".

Sky News Radio's first bulletin was at 14:00 on the same day. The bulletin was read by Ursula Hansford and was simulcast on the Sky News television channel. All IRN hourly bulletins carry Sky News branding and bulletins start with a time check intro: "From the Sky News Centre at [hour]". IRN agreed a further two-year contract with Sky News from March 2012, with a subsequent reported contract extension until March 2016 and March 2018.

No known challengers to the contract have since emerged and Sky News continues to supply IRN to this day. In March 2022, it was announced that a further "multi-year" contract extension was agreed between Sky News and IRN. In March 2025, Sky News and IRN reached a further renewal to its contract, adding the ability for affiliates to access video from Sky News for use on their digital platforms.

== Competitors to IRN ==
IRN has faced many competitors during its history. ITN briefly ran ITN Radio News, which broadcast hourly news bulletins on the Astra satellite daily from 06:00 to 23:00. The service ran from 4 March 1990 until 4 July 1991 and clients included Jazz FM in London, East End Radio in Glasgow and a number of other small, incremental radio stations.

On 5 July 1991, Chiltern Radio launched Network News, which broadcast hourly news bulletins and audio cuts on Chiltern's Supergold audio channel on the Astra satellite. Bulletins were broadcast 24 hours a day from Chiltern studios in Dunstable utilising audio from Sky News and CNN Radio. Copy and scripts were distributed by stations via fax and a premium rate fax-back service. Network News enjoyed considerable success and won the contract to supply news to Virgin Radio upon its launch in April 1993. However, it suffered a major blow when it lost the Virgin Radio contract to Reuters Radio News in April 1995 and GWR chose to close Network News in April 1996 when it took over the Chiltern Radio network.

Reuters Radio News ran from 1994 until June 1996 from studios at Gray's Inn Road in London. It supplied news to its own London Radio stations (formerly LBC), plus Scot FM, Heart FM, and Virgin Radio. Audio was mostly sourced from Sky News who Reuters had a news supply agreement with at the time.

Traffic information service Metro Networks took over the Virgin Radio news contract following the closure of Reuters Radio News. Audio was sourced from Sky News and CNN Radio and Virgin bulletins were branded as "News from Sky". It provided bespoke bulletins to stations including Beat 106, Vibe FM, Kiss 100 and Magic 105.4 but did not provide syndicated hourly news bulletins. The news service closed down in November 2002 following the decision by Virgin Radio to produce their news in-house.

BSkyB launched Sky News Radio in June 1999 as a rival to the ITN-operated IRN service. It initially provided bulletins to Talksport and subsequently around eighty radio stations before taking over the IRN contract in March 2009.

Current competitors to IRN are Feature Story News and Radio News Hub.

Feature Story News supplies hourly international news bulletins from studios in London and Washington DC. Thirty-second, three-minute and five-minute bulletins are distributed via FTP to clients including digital, community and online stations.

Radio News Hub supplies UK and international news bulletins from studios in Leeds. Hourly bulletins are distributed via FTP to clients including Dee Radio plus Radio One Mallorca in Spain and digital station Love 80s.

No live bulletins are provided, although occasional special live programming, such as election night coverage, is distributed to client stations via digital station News Radio UK.

== Content and bulletins ==
IRN's editorial services are provided by Sky News Radio, who distribute national and international news and sport audio and copy to all UK commercial radio stations, plus a number of international clients. Dave Terris is the Head of Audio for Sky News Radio and Editor of IRN. He is supported by two assistant editors - Ana Bates and Matt Steele - as well as a team of over twenty journalists, including Ruth McKee, Cat Soave, Faye Rowlands and Stevie Shillinglaw. They are based at the Sky News' headquarters in Osterley. There are four radio studios at Sky News Radio in Osterley and one in Westminster for political coverage.

IRN transmits a live two-minute national and international news bulletin on the hour, 24 hours a day. Many stations take the national IRN bulletin during evenings and weekends when local newsrooms are unstaffed. Other stations such as Fix Radio, Boom Radio and Sunrise Radio, along with numerous community stations, use the hourly IRN bulletins as their sole source of news. The UK's largest commercial radio group, Global, does not broadcast IRN bulletins on its radio stations, instead using its own bespoke local and national bulletins.

A two-minute recorded bulletin is offered during off-peak periods which is distributed to stations just before the top of the hour. This contains largely similar content to the live network bulletin. Bulletins are broadcast across the Bauer Radio network as well as on a number of other stations.

== Serial data ==
In addition to a satellite feed with three separate channels, IRN also operates a serial data channel. This communicates with the IRN Demux 2 unit which the majority of commercial radio clients have.

This demultiplexer allows up to eight serial data channels of text information to be transmitted. Client stations can (and normally do) have a Major Story Alarm (also known as an OBIT Alarm) in their newsrooms and studios. The IRN news desk can trigger an alert at any time, which will be picked up by the demux units and set off the alert. Reasons for doing this include a major incident/terror attack or the death of a member of the Royal Family (see Obituary procedure).

IRN's serial data channel was previously used to trigger radio station idents during the Big Top 40 chart show, which was distributed via the IRN3 stereo programme channel. On receiving the corresponding command, the three-second localisers would play from each client station's play-out system.

As of 6 January 2019, IRN is no longer used to distribute the Big Top 40, as it is exclusively broadcast on Global's Heart and Capital stations and is no longer syndicated to the wider network.

== Obituary procedure ==
Most client stations have blue "obit lights" installed in their studios which are automatically triggered by IRN in the event of the death of a member of the Royal Family or other major national (and in some cases international) figure. This is designed to give stations warning of such an event and allow them to adjust their output accordingly.

Formerly, there was a strictly defined protocol for such occasions that all ILR stations were required to follow which included suspending normal programming and advertising. IRN would broadcast a news flash after confirmation of the death, then a five-minute news bulletin on the next hour followed by a one-minute version of the national anthem. The IRN network channel would then switch to special programming which consisted of light instrumental music and announcements every ten minutes, with extended news bulletins on the hour and half-hour. The special service of music programming would normally last for three hours, although extended and additional bulletins would continue for the next 24–48 hours.

Over time, however, the status of the obituary protocol has declined to the point where there is no longer any statutory instruction, obligation or procedure defined anywhere, either in the Ofcom code nor any station's licence. It is generally accepted that broadcasters will adopt a suitable tone of some kind, but there is no formal requirement for them to do so, and the nature of any obituary response is entirely down to the individual stations.

Although there is no formal obituary list of members of the royal family, it is widely accepted to include King Charles and Prince William.

In the event of a major news story or royal death, most commercial stations in recent years have produced their own programming with suitably adjusted music and news bulletins every 15–30 minutes.

IRN was strongly criticised by many of its client stations for its handling of the death of Queen Elizabeth The Queen Mother on 30 March 2002. A staff member pressed the wrong button and failed to alert the 258 stations on the network to the news, resulting in many presenters and newsreaders first hearing about the death from other news sources. IRN editor Jon Godel subsequently issued an apology in a memo addressed to "all news editors and programme controllers" in which he admitted this was "not IRN's finest hour".

The most recent obituary procedures have been activated following the death of Prince Philip, Duke of Edinburgh on 9 April 2021, and the death of Elizabeth II on 8 September 2022. The announcement was made to the network by Cat Soave.

== Special bulletins ==
=== Remembrance Sunday ===
The 11:00 bulletin on Remembrance Sunday includes coverage of the national two minutes' silence at The Cenotaph in London.

On Astra and IRN1, the bulletin starts at 10:59:00, with the newsreader crossing to Big Ben in London at 10:59:55 for the two minutes' silence and the Last Post. At approximately 11:03:27, the newsreader resumes with a brief summary of other news before finishing the bulletin at 11:04:00.

On the IRN2 channel, a clean feed of Big Ben, atmosphere from the two minutes silence and the Last Post is broadcast.

On Armistice Day, the standard two-minute IRN bulletin is broadcast at 11:00 on IRN1. "Ambient silence" is transmitted on IRN2 for stations wishing to observe two minutes' silence. In the case of Armistice Day falling on a Sunday, the above Remembrance Sunday arrangements apply.

=== Royal Christmas Message ===
The Royal Christmas Message is broadcast on the Astra and IRN1 channel at 15:00 on Christmas Day.

There is no news bulletin or introduction to the speech, and the five-minute-long broadcast ends with the National Anthem.

== Audio and copy ==
All audio and copy is distributed by Sky News via the IRN website. In addition to scripts and copy written by IRN journalists, access is also available to Press Association news wires, weather forecasts from the Met Office and a breakfast showprep service from Murf Media.

Stations can also source their own audio cuts from Sky News and Sky Sports News television channels. IRN also provide a feed of Sky News national news and sports stories to radio station websites.

IRN operates two audio channels on the Astra 2E satellite: IRN1 transmits the hourly news bulletins, live sports reports and the classified football results. IRN2 transmits live press conferences, Prime Minister's Questions and other significant Parliamentary events.

In the event of a major news story (e.g. royal death or major terrorist incident), audio from Sky News television will be relayed on IRN1.

The Sky News audio feed will be interrupted with the normal hourly news bulletins, which may be extended to three minutes duration, along with additional one-minute bulletins on the half-hour.

A continuous audio feed of Sky News television without interruption for news bulletins will be relayed on IRN2.

Many community, student and hospital radio stations around the UK take the hourly bulletin service. Copy and audio cuts are also used by BFBS Radio in addition to stations in the Republic of Ireland, Spain, Cyprus, UAE, South Africa and Australia.

== IRN Sport ==
IRN's sports output includes weekday breakfast, lunchtime and afternoon sports bulletins, audio cuts and packages and a full Saturday afternoon sports service. Joe Rawson is the editor of IRN Sport.

IRN supplies match reports from every English Premier League football match with reporters supplied by sports radio agency World Sports Communications and also sells licences to local stations to allow them to broadcast football match reports and commentaries.

Up to three reports each half, plus previews, goal flashes and half-time and full-time reports are sent from each match via the IRN1 and IRN2 satellite channels. One featured match each Saturday features live clockstart reports at 15:14, 15:26, 15:38, 16:14, 16:26 and 16:38.

A classified football results check is broadcast every Saturday at 17:10.

The service also includes reports from Six Nations Rugby matches, Wimbledon, England home football and any other major sporting events.
