= Academy FM =

Academy FM may refer to either:

- Academy FM (Thanet), serving the district of Thanet in Kent and started broadcasting in 2010
- Radio Folkestone, previously known as Academy FM Folkestone, serving the town of Folkestone in Kent and started broadcasting in 2011
