= Phil Mercer =

British radio presenter (born 1974)

- Born: 1974 (age 51–52); Reigate, Surrey, England
- Occupation: Broadcaster
- Known for: Work with AA Roadwatch ● Premier Radio ● trafficlink ● BBC Local Radio
- Website: www.philmercer.com

Phil Mercer is an English radio presenter born in Reigate, Surrey. He currently presents a Sunday Show on BBC Radio Berkshire.

== Career ==
Mercer started in radio reading travel news for (the now defunct) AA Roadwatch in 1994. He then moved to Premier Radio to present first the overnight show, then Drivetime and Breakfast before moving into programme management.

After seven years at Premier, Mercer returned to travel news, working for trafficlink presenting radio bulletins for, among others Virgin, Classic FM and BBC Local Radio.

In 2004 Mercer joined BBC Radio Oxford as the Afternoon Show presenter and then and now presents the weekend breakfast show. He is a keen walker and leads regular countryside walks for the listeners. He has also reviewed movies for the Daytime show.

In April 2008 he made his first television debut for BBC Oxford News on BBC One.

For a time he presented the Sunday Gardening and Food show Garden Café with Sophie Grigson on BBC Radio Oxford.

In August 2024 he took over presenting the breakfast show for BBC Radio Berkshire.

== Personal life ==
Mercer lives in Oxfordshire and apart from his walking he is an amateur photographer. He has his own biographical website and blog.
