= 1035 AM =

AM radio frequency

The following radio stations broadcast on AM frequency 1035 kHz:

== China ==
- CNR The Voice of China, mainly in Chuzhou, Dalian, Datong, Enshi Prefecture, Fuxinm, Gannan Prefecture, Hefei, Hegang, Hulunbuir, Jiayuguan, Jinchang, Jinzhou, Jixi, Lanzhou, Liaocheng, Mudanjiang, Pingxiang, Qingyang, Qiqihar, Rizhao, Shiyan, Tieling, Wuhan, Yantai, Yichang, Yuncheng, Zaozhuang, Zhangjiajie, Zhangye and Zibo

== United Kingdom ==
- Lyca Gold in London
