= The Bald Builders =

British presenting duo

Bald Builders
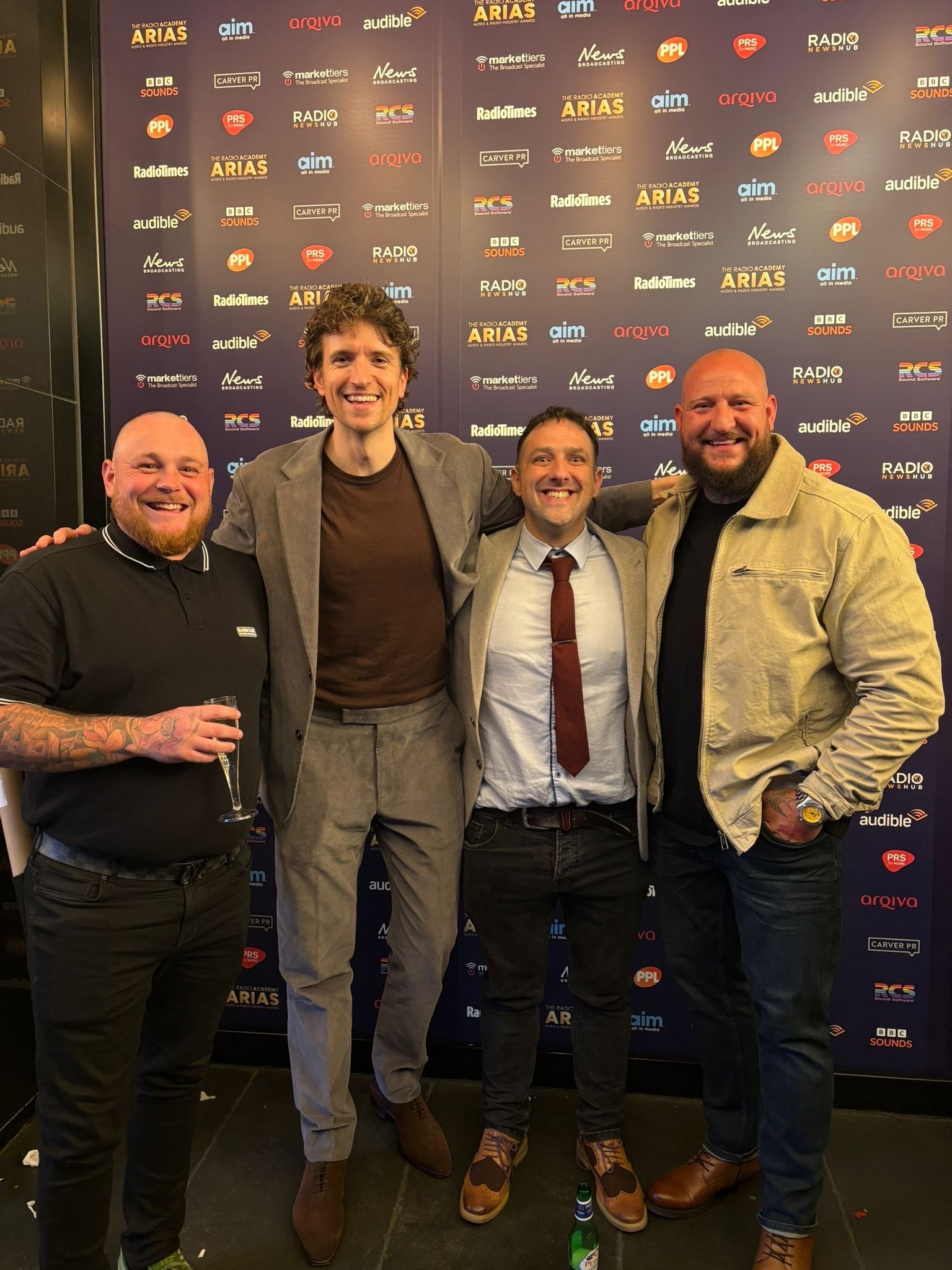
- The Bald Builders, their producer Jack and Greg James at the ARIAS
- Born: Brad Hanson and Samuel Alexander Hughes

YouTube information
- Channel: Bald Builders
- Subscribers: 103,000
- Last updated: 30 October 2025
- Website: www.thebaldbuilders.com

The Bald Builders are a British double act composed of Brad Hanson and Samuel Alexander Hughes. They are known for creating content related to the building trade, initially gaining prominence through social media platforms before becoming presenters on Fix Radio.

Hanson and Hughes are primarily recognized for their radio show, "The Bald Builders Breakfast," which is broadcast five days a week on Fix Radio.

== Career ==
=== Online presence ===
Brad Hanson and Samuel Hughes initially gained recognition as social media personalities, accumulating a combined following of approximately 3 million across platforms including YouTube, Facebook, Instagram, and TikTok.

=== Radio broadcasting ===
The duo joined Fix Radio in 2020, launching their first radio program, "The Bald Brunch." Two years later, they transitioned to the breakfast slot, where they began hosting "The Bald Builders Breakfast," which is broadcast nationally 5 days a week.

== Social Impact ==
Brad and Sam have been noted to promote children’s wellbeing through initiatives such as providing free meals to children and giving out over 5,000 Christmas presents to children during 2020 and the Covid-19 Pandemic.

Through their radio show, Brad and Sam have run light-hearted initiatives highlighting small businesses and communities across the UK. Their most notable initiative was 'Café of the Year,' where they encouraged listeners to vote for their favourite café, culminating in the crowning of a national winner.

== Other ventures ==
The Bald Builders have expanded their activities into the food service industry. Their initial venture was a food truck named The Bald Kitchen. Subsequently, they upgraded to a larger, permanent kitchen facility and also established the Bald Drive Through.

== Awards ==
Awards and Nominations
Year	Work	Award	Category	Result	Ref
2023	The Bald Builders Breakfast	Audio and Radio Industry Awards	Best New Radio Show	Nominated	
2023	Ultimate Builders Portaloo	Loo of the Year Award	Building and Construction	Won	
2025	The Bald Builders Breakfast	Audio and Radio Industry Awards	Best Music Breakfast Show	Silver	
