= Ashton Moss transmitting stations =

The Ashton Moss transmitting stations are two independent facilities for medium wave broadcasting near Ashton Moss, an area of Tameside in Greater Manchester. They are approximately 3/4 mile (1.2 km) apart.

== Original BBC station ==
Ashton Moss (West)
- Location within Greater Manchester
- Location: Ashton Moss, Tameside, Greater Manchester
- Coordinates: 53.483056°N 2.128611°W
- Grid reference: SJ9146698517

Originally constructed by the BBC for its local radio service, BBC Radio Manchester, located at 53°28′59″N 2°7′43″W, it was used by the BBC from 1976 until 1992 when the BBC was forced to relinquish the frequency so that it could be used by a commercial radio station, and from 1994 until 2024, when various commercial stations used it, the first being Fortune 1458 and the last to use it was Gold on 1458 kHz with a power of 5 kW.

It consists of 3 free-standing lattice towers, arranged as a directional array, insulated against ground.

It is one of the few broadcasting stations in Europe using free-standing tower radiators.

It is designated "Ashton Moss (West) MF" by owners Arqiva.

The transmitter broadcasting Gold on 1458 kHz was switched off on 27 April 2024, and is still standing. No decision has been announced regarding what will happen to the towers and the transmitter.

== Original IBA station ==
Ashton Moss (East)
- Location within Greater Manchester
- Location: Ashton Moss, Tameside, Greater Manchester
- Coordinates: 53.491111°N 2.115278°W
- Grid reference: SJ9235299412
- Built: 1974

Originally constructed in 1974 for the IBA for its local radio contractor, Piccadilly Radio, located at 53°29′28″N 2°6′55″W

This facility was used for transmitting Greatest Hits Radio Manchester on 1152 kHz. It uses a directional antenna consisting of 4 guyed masts, insulated against ground. This antenna had a maximum output toward 250°. In this direction the ERP is 1.5 kW, whereby the transmitter output is 350 Watts.

The antenna of this transmitter has therefore a highly directional pattern, in order not to interfere with other transmitters using the same frequency.

The 1152 kHz service ceased operation on the 26th April 2021, following the service becoming available on 96.2 MHz FM in the local area. The transmitter and its four towers were demolished in November 2025.

Additionally, Asian Sound operated from this site on 1377 kHz. On 22 April 2024, Asian Sound has been renamed to Lyca Radio Greater Manchester.

It is designated "Ashton Moss (East) MF" by owners Arqiva.

== Arqiva ==
The stations were constructed and owned by the BBC and IBA as indicated above. Over time, (1974-2007), by a series of asset sell offs, and mergers, both sites are now owned and operated by Arqiva

== Analogue radio services ==
Frequency	kW	Service	Site
1377 kHz	0.08	Lyca Radio Greater Manchester	East

=== Former ===
Frequency	kW	Service	Site	Switch-off date
1152 kHz	1.5	Greatest Hits Radio	East	26 April 2021
1458 kHz	5	Gold	West	27 April 2024
