= Win 94.6 FM =

Mumbai; India
- Frequency: 94.6 MHz

History
- First air date: 30 April 2001
- Last air date: 27 May 2004

Win 94.6 FM was an FM radio channel in Mumbai, India that played Hindi songs. Broadcasting began on 30 April 2001 on frequency 94.6 MHz. It was the most popular radio station in Mumbai while on the air. The radio station played a variety of music, including old and modern songs. Although advertising was limited, Win 94.6 FM was the home of a few popular radio jockeys. It was indeed the "No.1 Radio Station In Mumbai." Their punchline was "Hit pe hit pe hit." Win 94.6 FM went off the air on 27 May 2004.

== Information ==
WIN 94.6, a private 24-hour FM radio station, launched in Mumbai on 30 April 2001. The letters WIN stand for the corresponding numbers 946 on the dial pad of a keypad. The station was promoted by Millennium Broadcast.

Radio stations are required to enter into a mandatory agreement with Phonographic Performance Limited (PPL), which allows them to use the content owned by music companies. Millennium had signed an agreement with PPL to use content at Rs 400 per hour.

WIN also had licenses to start FM stations in Chennai and Delhi. The company intended to launch stations in these metro areas on 29 August 2001.

For its Mumbai FM station, WIN had the basic infrastructure that included a studio and production facilities. The transmission tower for the station was located in central Mumbai.

WIN 94.6 went off the air on 30 April 2004.

== Shows ==
€ Asmita, the only Marathi show on WIN 94.6 FM in Mumbai, with its radio jockey Anjali

€ Morning No.1

€ Anurag Ke Raag

Ek Kahani aisi bhi @9 pm Monday to Friday

== Radio Jockeys [RJ's] ==
The channel had many RJ's who are now employed by other radio stations.

- RJ Roshan Abbas
- Rahul Mulani [prefers the term Radio Host] - now an independent Professional Voice Artiste
- RJ Anjali [Now Working with Radio Surbhi- A Marathi Radio station of World Space Satellite Radio]
- RJ Malishka {Now Working with Red FM (India) 93.5}
- RJ Anuraag Pandey {Now Working with Fever 104 FM}
- RJ Devika
- RJ Hema
- RJ Vignesh Iyer
- RJ Divya

On 29 April 2004 at 11:06 am, the Radio Station went off the air. The station has since been closed down and no longer broadcasts. WIN 94.6 surrendered its license to protest against the high enforcement of taxes from their radio channel.

== See also ==
List of FM radio stations in India
