= Asian Sound =

Former radio station in Manchester, England

Coordinates: 53.492036°N 2.245444°W

Asian Sound Radio

England
- Broadcast area: North West England, North Yorkshire
- Frequencies: AM: 963 kHz; 1377 KHz; DAB Digital Radio; TuneIn Radio

Programming
- Format: Asian

Ownership
- Owner: Lyca Media II Ltd

History
- First air date: 3 June 1996 (28 years ago)
- Last air date: 22 April 2024 (1 year ago) (renamed to Lyca Radio Greater Manchester)

Links
- Website: Asian Sound Radio

Asian Sound Radio was a radio station located in Broadcast House, Southall Street in Manchester. It was the only 24-hour commercial radio station in the North West dedicated to the Asian community, which recently broadcast on MW across the whole region from Preston in the North to Stockport in the South. The programming is a blend of news, current affairs, interviews, competitions, music and information in English, Urdu, Punjabi, Pashto Bengali and Gujarati.

The station, which launched in 1996, had beaten off competition from Buzz 963AM which had proposed a full-service English speaking station.

On 22 April 2024, Asian Sound Radio was renamed Lyca Radio Greater Manchester following Lyca's acquisition of the station in 2023. The output features local content and some networked programming from London.
