= Revival FM =

Coordinates: 55°55′55″N 03°58′55″W

- Cumbernauld and Glasgow; Scotland
- Frequencies: 100.8 MHz (2006–2022); 93.0 MHz (2019–2022)

History
- First air date: 3 September 2006
- Last air date: 2022

Revival FM was a British Christian-based community radio station and charity in Scotland, operating under a Community Radio Licence. It operated from 2006 and 2022 and closed amid embezzlement by its director, Andrew Polson.

== History ==
The station was originally located in Cumbernauld near Glasgow and commenced broadcasting on 100.8 MHz FM on 3 September 2006. An initial 5 year licence was awarded by Ofcom (Office of Communications) to permit broadcasts until September 2011. In March 2011 the station announced that this licence had been extended for a further 5 years taking broadcasts through until September 2016, with an extension to the licence awarded until September 2021.

In 2018 Ofcom awarded a second licence to Revival FM which allowed it to establish a transmitter in the city of Glasgow. This came on air at Easter 2019 on 93 MHz FM. Also in 2019, the station's output was added to the DAB output of the small scale trial mux in Glasgow operated by Brave Broadcasting.

The station's output was available online at www.revival.fm. Revival FM comes from a history of ten years of part-time broadcasting under the callsign Revival Radio. The station was operated by Revival Radio Ltd which is a recognised Scottish charity.

The station aired a mixture of Christian music (contemporary and traditional), topical debate and discussion, community focus and features, devotional and prayer programmes, news and sport. Revival FM also hosted or promoted various Christian concerts in different locations in Scotland.

In October 2022 the station's 100.8FM frequency ceased live broadcasting and the Cumbernauld transmitter went off air. In its May 2023 Radio Broadcast Update, Ofcom announced that the Cumbernauld licence had been transferred to Home Church Scotland.

In its April 2024 Radio Broadcast Update, Ofcom announced that Revival FM was granted a five-year extension licence for its 93FM Glasgow licence. The station continued to broadcast from its purpose-built Glasgow Studios in Cowcaddens, however it ceased broadcasting and Revival FM (Glasgow) Ltd. was dissolved in April 2025.

In October 2025 former director Andrew Polson was found guilty of a £188,000 romance fraud and also embezzling over £9,000 from the radio station. The following month he was sentenced to 22 months in prison and disqualified from being a company director for 5 years. In his closing remarks Sheriff Reid told Polson, "The consequences of your misbehaviour lead to the demise of the organisation."
