= Rewind Radio =

British independent radio station

Cornwall's Rewind Radio is an Independent Local Radio station broadcasting in Cornwall, established in 2021. The station is available in Cornwall through DAB and online.

Founded by Richard Woods, Shaun Ford and Jamie Reed, online test transmissions for Rewind Radio began during England's 2021 COVID-19 lockdown, with the station launching on 7 October 2021. The station's presenting team included local presenters Victoria Leigh, Matt Rogers and Gavin Marshall. From April 2024, Rewind Radio became the only local commercial radio station to serve the county following Bauer Media Audio UK's decision to merge Pirate FM with its national Greatest Hits Radio network.

In November 2023, Jamie Reed announced his departure from Cornwall's Rewind Radio for health reasons. Also, in November 2023, the station appointed Paul Fenton as its national sales director, and he took up the post on 1 December.

In March 2024, Cornwall's Rewind Radio's managing director, Richard Woods, and commercial director Martyn Saulsbury met local MPs George Eustace and Derek Thomas at Westminster as part of their campaign to make FM radio available throughout Cornwall, with both MPs giving their support to a county-wide FM frequency for local output.

On 2 April 2024, the station launched a new weekday breakfast show presented by Josh Curnow and Laura Mac. On 3 June, the station announced that it had hired former BBC Radio Cornwall presenter Jack Murley as programme controller and weekday midmorning presenter.

On 3 March 2026, it was announced that Rewind Radio had appointed Craig Hicks as interim programme manager and Duchy Daytime presenter.

On 11 September 2026, it was announced that Rewind Radio would launch a sister station, Rewind Radio Retro, in October.
