= Datshiane Navanayagam =

British journalist and broadcaster

- Born: May 1987 (age 38–39)
- Education: South Hampstead High School
- Alma mater: Trinity Hall, Cambridge (History)
- Occupations: Journalist, broadcaster
- Employer(s): BBC; Channel 4 ITV
- Known for: Presenting on BBC Radio 4, BBC World Service, Countryfile, Dispatches, Tonight

Datshiane Navanayagam (born May 1987) is a British journalist and broadcaster working for a variety of media outlets.

== Background ==
Navanayagam's grandparents were born in Sri Lanka and moved to Malaysia, and her father moved from there to London in the 1950s. Navanayagam had a challenging childhood during which she spent periods of time being homeless. Her father experienced disability during her childhood and at one point, Navanayagam was placed in a single room in a bed-and-breakfast along with three members of her family. Navanayagam attended South Hampstead High School in South Hampstead, London on a bursary. After finishing school, she attended the University of Cambridge from 2005 where she studied history at Trinity Hall.

== Career ==
Navanayagam's broadcasting career began in local radio. She was then awarded a place on the BBC Production Trainee scheme.

In 2013, she reported for Farming Today on BBC Radio 4.

In 2018, Navanayagam made, in collaboration with colleagues, and presented, a Channel 4 Dispatches documentary examining homelessness affecting working adults. The documentary was created based on research carried out by a homelessness charity. Navanayagam had experienced homelessness while being adult prior to making the documentary in collaboration with colleagues. Her work on housing issues also includes a 2019 Channel 4 Dispatches documentary about poor practice by landlords and a 2020 BBC Panorama documentary about a government shared-ownership housing scheme.

As of 2017 and 2018, Navanayagam's on-air work for the BBC was across range of factual programmes. In 2021, she presented several episodes of the Media Show on BBC Radio 4. As of 2022 and 2023, Navanayagam's on-air BBC work remained across a variety of factual programmes. In April 2024, Navanayagam was announced as one of the two new presenters of The Conversation, a programme about women's experiences and issues on the BBC World Service. As of late 2024, Navanayagam was also a presenter of Countryfile on BBC One, a reporter for File on 4 on BBC Radio 4, and a reporter for Tonight on ITV1.

Navanayagam occasionally presents Woman's Hour on BBC Radio 4. She continues to co-make and present factual and investigative documentaries for a variety of media outlets.

Navanayagam has sat in for other presenters on BBC Radio 5 Live news programmes; for example, in July 2023, she co-presented Saturday Breakfast and in September 2024 she co-presented Drive.

Navanayagam is the co-presenter of a series of podcasts for BBC Bitesize which focuses on topics within GCSE History.

Navanayagam is a judge for the Trinity Hall Prize in Student Journalism, run by the Cambridge University college which she attended.
