= Hayes FM =

London; England
- Broadcast area: Hayes
- Frequency: 91.8 FM

Programming
- Format: Non-commercial

History
- First air date: 1 September 2007

Links
- Webcast: Listen Live
- Website: www.hayesfm.org.uk

Hayes FM (91.8 FM) is a community-focused local radio station based in Hayes, West London, England.

== Audience ==
The target audience is people living and working within a three-mile radius of Hayes in the south of the London Borough of Hillingdon. The station is non-commercial – it is not obliged to sell advertisements in order to remain operational. This gives autonomy with format, allowing a variety of tastes to be accommodated in programming.

== History ==
Hayes FM was launched out of an initiative between Sutish Sharma and local MP John McDonnell. The initiative's aim was to contribute towards engaging the three West London boroughs' different communities.

In 2003, Hayes FM undertook a Restricted Service Licence for one month. In 2004, the station developed accredited training courses, and in November of that year submitted an application to Ofcom for a local radio licence. Hayes FM was awarded a radio operators licence in 2006; it started broadcasting on 1 September 2007.
