= David Prever =

English radio presenter

- Born: c.1967 (age 58–59); London, England
- Occupations: Radio host, journalist, fiction writer, entrepreneur
- Spouse: Victoria Prever
- Awards: Sony Award (4x)
- Website: davidprever.com

David Prever (born ca. 1967) is a radio presenter, and thriller author. As of 2023 he is head of programming at Radio News Hub.

== Early life ==
Prever was born in London and grew up in Chigwell, Essex. He was educated at Bancroft's School in Woodford Green and attended the Sylvia Young Theatre School. He left school at 17 to work in broadcasting.

== Radio ==
Prever joined Northampton's Hereward Radio in 1984, before moving to GWR Radio in Bath and Bristol. This was followed by five years in the North East at Newcastle's Metro Radio.

Returning to London, he worked for Jazz FM hosting Saturday nights and then weekend breakfast, before taking over the weekday breakfast show where he won a New York Festival Award.

Poached by Chrysalis Radio, he joined Heart 106.2 initially on mid-mornings and then the breakfast show with Jon Davis and Kara Noble, winning a Sony Gold Award.

He left Heart to join Magic 105.4 on Drivetime before landing the afternoon show on the relaunched LBC 97.3 Since leaving LBC in 2005, the radio stations he has worked for have included TalkSPORT, Smooth Radio and BBC London 94.9, BBC Radio Berkshire, BBC Radio Northampton and Three Counties Radio.

On 23 October 2012 it was announced that Prever would become the permanent host of the weekend mid-morning show on Smooth Radio, replacing Lynn Parsons who would take over the weekday mid morning slot from December following Mark Goodier's departure from the network. Prever left Smooth Radio in February 2014.

In March 2023, it was announced that Prever would leave BBC Radio Oxford to take up the role of head of programming at Radio News Hub. On 11 January 2024 it was announced that Prever would present Review of the Week, a 30-minute weekly programme for Radio News Hub that would be made available freely for broadcast by radio stations beginning on 2 February.

== Business ==
In 1991, Prever formed EPM and Lots of Hits Music, with colleague Tim Smith. The record and music publishing formed joint ventures with Universal, PWL and Telstar Records.

== Writing ==
As a journalist, Prever has contributed articles for The Times, The Guardian and The Express, where he wrote a regular column. Signed to the Irene Goodman Literary Agency, he self-published his debut novel, a thriller entitled The Blood Banker, in 2012.

== Personal life ==
Prever has two children, an older boy and a girl, with his wife Victoria, a food writer. Both children were born as a result of in vitro fertilisation, a journey they documented in a diary for The Jewish Chronicle.
