= Trafficlink =

British company which provides traffic information

- Founded: 1995
- Parent: INRIX
- Website: www.trafficlink.co.uk

Trafficlink, now called INRIX, is the former name of the British company specialising in providing real-time traffic information. Clients include the BBC, ITN, ITV, Sky News and Transport Direct. In partnership with Global Traffic Network it provides traffic and travel information to the majority of UK commercial and community radio stations including Bauer Radio, Global Radio, Absolute Radio and GMG Radio. Since January 2012, the company has been known as INRIX following the acquisition of Trafficlink in summer 2011.

== History ==
The company was founded in 1994, by Ben Budworth, as Metro Networks Ltd, loosely based on the American company Metro Networks US. As a direct competitor to the then market-dominant AA Roadwatch, the company negotiated a number of contracts with local commercial radio stations in its early days, and benefited heavily from an agreement to supply all BBC local radio stations with travel data in 1998. In 2001, Metro Networks was rebranded as Trafficlink and, a year later, was co-awarded an enlarged BBC contract, which saw the company supplying data to the corporation's national stations, with the Serco group. In September 2011, the company was acquired by the US-based INRIX.

From 1 June 2020, all INRIX-voiced bulletins for BBC local radio stations were dropped resulting in a number of redundancies and office closures. While INRIX continues to supply data to the BBC and all major commercial radio groups, INRIX radio bulletins now only appear on a small number of commercial radio stations including LBC News, Talksport and talkRADIO.

== UK wide ==
Trafficlink had offices in: London, Altrincham and Bristol, plus Birmingham and Manchester and a base within Traffic Wales' Control Centre in Cardiff and a base within Traffic Scotland's Control Centre in South Queensferry, near Edinburgh.

== Former Trafficlink presenters ==
- Joel Ross
- Wes Butters
- Simon Beale
- Vic McGlynn
- Katherine Jakeways
- Chrissie Reidy
- OJ Borg
- Keith Ellery
