= Radio News Hub =

Radio News Hub is a provider of news bulletins for radio stations based in the United Kingdom. The company, which has its head office in Leeds, West Yorkshire, provides 1-minute and 2-minute bulletins for English-speaking radio stations both in the United Kingdom and internationally. As of 2025 it produces bulletins for c. 400 stations.

== History ==
Launched in 2014, Radio News Hub was established to provide an alternative news service to existing providers, and was founded by a team of four journalists; Dave Uttley, Jamie Fletcher, Jon Francis and Stephanie Otty. As well as providing news updates it also supplies weather, travel, sport and entertainment bulletins. In 2018 the company celebrated providing its one millionth bulletin to its providers. Also in 2018 the company launched a new website and redesigned its dispatch system. In 2020, Radio News Hub appointed former TalkRadio news presenter Carl Hartley as a senior journalist.

Having started its operations in an underground office in Leeds during 2014, Radio News Hub moved to a serviced office block in the city in 2015. In November 2020, it announced plans to relocate to purpose-built studios, also based in Leeds.

Radio News Hub's national weather bulletins broadcast every hour on Boom Radio.

In January 2023, Radio News Hub was acquired by Markettiers4DC, a broadcasting PR agency.

On 13 February 2023 it was announced that Radio News Hub had become an official partner of the Radio Academy. The agreement meant Radio News Hub would be the official partners for the 2023 Radio Festival and the 2023 Audio and Radio Industry Awards. On 22 March 2023, David Prever the breakfast show presenter at BBC Radio Oxford, announced he would be joining Radio News Hub as their Head of Programming. On 7 March 2024, Howard Hughes joined Radio News Hub to present news bulletins for a day to mark the company's ninth anniversary.

On 15 October 2024, it was announced that Radio News Hub had appointed Lee Allestone as their Commercial Director. On 22 November 2024, Radio News Hub announced they had hired Ricky Durkin as their Head of Content and Dave McMullan as News Editor.

On 3 February 2025, Radio News Hub launched a worldwide hourly news service, delivering news to radio stations in their native languages.

On 5 December 2025, Radio News Hub announced it had appointed Lisa Darvill as its Newsroom Manager.

== Content ==
Radio News Hub content is broadcast on digital station News Radio UK.

National and international news, sport, business and showbiz bulletins are broadcast on a rolling 10-minute loop. The station also offers special live programming to client stations, including UK and US election night coverage.

A 10-minute extended "Lunchtime News" and "Evening News" programme is available on weekdays to client stations.

== Free news bulletins ==
In March 2020 Radio News Hub announced that it would produce a daily ten-minute round-up of news relating to the COVID-19 pandemic that would be made available free of charge to any radio station that wishes to carry the bulletin. In September 2022, a free daily bulletin covering events following the death of Queen Elizabeth II was also offered. On 7 March 2023, Radio News Hub announced it would make a free two-hour live programme available providing budget coverage on Budget Day (15 March). The programme included coverage of the budget speech, as well as analysis from a panel of experts.

On 24 April 2023, Radio News Hub announced it would be providing free coverage of the Coronation of Charles III on 6 May, with Martin Kelner hired to present the coverage.

On 5 June 2023 Radio News Hub announced it would provide radio stations with free hourly updates on the 2023 Wimbledon Championships, presented by John Cushing.

On 11 January 2024, Radio News Hub announced that David Prever would present Review of the Week, a weekly programme that would be made available free to radio stations from 2 February.

On 5 February, Radio News Hub announced that Gaby Roslin would present a free programme to coincide with the UK's Day of Reflection on 3 March.

On 5 June 2024, and following the announcement of the 2024 general election, Radio News Hub confirmed that Jonathan Charles would present an eight-hour live election night broadcast from College Green, beginning at 10pm, and which would be made available free to its clients.

On 16 July, Radio News Hub announced the forthcoming launch of a 30-minute weekly health related programme presented by Dr Hilary Jones, beginning on 25 July and available free to radio stations.

On 18 March 2025, Radio News Hub announced the launch of Home Front with Russell Quirk, a 12-part series on the subject of property, which would launch the following week.

On 20 May 2025, Radio News Hub announced the launch of Dermot Murnaghan's Legends of News, a weekly programme in which Dermot Murnaghan would talk to a prominent journalist, with the first edition featuring John Sergeant.
