= Academy FM (Thanet) =

107.8 Academy FM (Thanet)

England
- Broadcast area: Margate, Ramsgate, Broadstairs, Birchington, Westgate-on-Sea and villages
- Frequencies: 107.8 MHz and online

History
- First air date: 5 April 2010

Technical information
- Transmitter coordinates: 51.3505°N 1.3924°E

Links
- Website: www.academyfmthanet.com

Academy FM (Thanet) is a Charity community 24-hour local radio station based in Ramsgate, Kent, England, which broadcasts to the Isle of Thanet. It launched on 5 April 2010, Easter Monday.

The licence for the station was granted by OFCOM on 17 June 2009.

The station, based within The Royal Harbour Academy comprehensive secondary school, Ramsgate, uses two purpose-built studios with RCS Selector and Mastercontrol. The station broadcasts on 107.8 FM and online, and via its own app and the tune-in website.

Academy FM have a number of broadcasters who have worked in commercial radio; these, and some past presenters have worked at Thanet Local Radio (TLR). Station presenters provide experience for the local community and students within the school and some are responsible for part of the station output.

Since its launch the station has supported a number of events in the area. It provides open access to community groups, charities and non-profit organisations, and encouragement to local bands and singers to produce and broadcast their music.

Academy FM produces local news in weekday breakfast and drivetime shows and broadcasts national headlines hourly and at other times from Sky News, and gives traffic, travel and local event information. A Saturday sport program is also broadcast. Local organisations and groups are given access through community action spots and are invited to talk on air.

107.8 Academy FM Thanet is the only radio station that broadcasts from Thanet-to-Thanet providing 100% local programming. Music played is from a playlist of over 9,000 songs from the mid-1960s to the present day.

In December 2015 it was announced that the station would cease broadcasting on 18 December 2015. The station was saved and is now doing well, with Debbie Day working as the Station & Programme Manager.
