= Loo of the Year Awards =

British public toilet awards

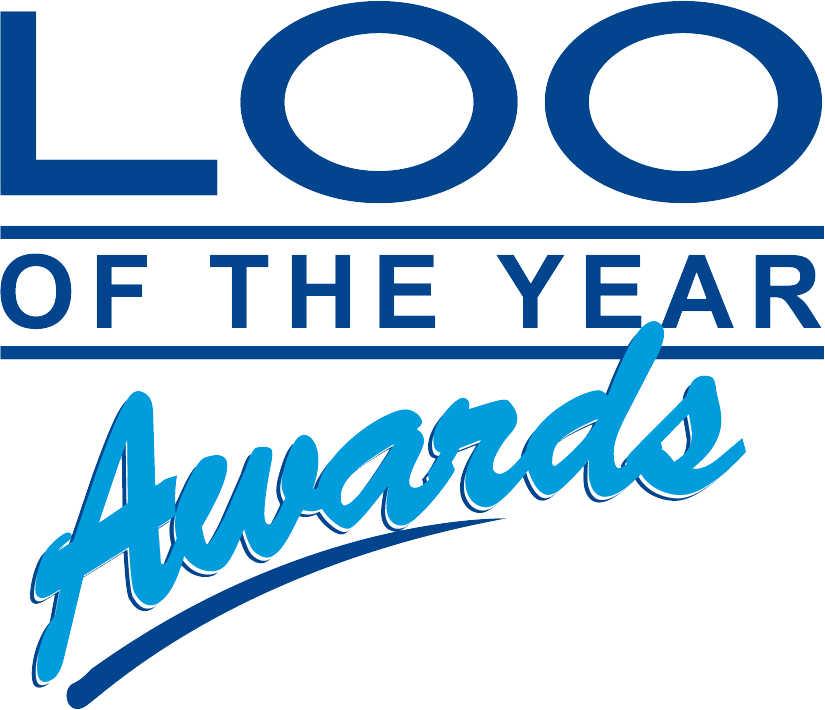
- Awarded for: Recognising the best toilets in Britain, Ireland and the Channel Islands
- Country: United Kingdom
- First award: 1987; 39 years ago
- Website: loo.co.uk

The Loo of the Year Awards are run to celebrate the best public toilets in the United Kingdom, and promote high standards.

The awards competition receives sponsorship from a number of companies involved in providing products and services to washroom providers.

== History ==
First introduced in 1987, the Loo of the Year Awards competition has run annually, except for 1993.

== Eligibility criteria ==
Any type of public facility ('away from home' toilet) can be nominated for consideration. There are sixty four award categories. Eligible facilities can be located in England, Scotland, Wales or Ireland.

Anyone can submit a nomination—staff, customers, visitors, managers, owners or contractors—but owners or managers must authorise entries.

== Judging criteria ==
After an unannounced inspection from an authorised Loo of the Year Awards Inspector, nominees are graded on a scale from Bronze to Diamond. Grades are awarded based on 101 criteria, and are judged on both male and female facilities, as well as any baby changing and accessible facilities provided. The criteria include cleanliness, decor, signage, accessibility and customer care.

== Awards ==
Awards are given in one of sixty three categories. An entrant receiving a Diamond or possibly a Platinum grading will be considered for one a number of major national awards in each of England, Scotland, Wales and Ireland:

- National Category Winners (up to sixty-three categories in each country)
- National Accessible Toilet Winner
- National (Baby) Changing Facilities Winner
- Public Toilet Entries – National Winner
- Individual Category Entries – National Winner
- Changing Places Toilet Entries – National Winner
- Space to Change Toilet Entries – National Winner
- Eco Friendly Toilet – National Winner
- Local Authority Award – National Winner
- Toilets in Education – National Winner
- Hygiene Room – National Winner

Other awards include:

Individual UK Loo of the Year Trophy
The winner of this award is selected from one of the eight national winners in the Public Toilet Entries and the Individual Category Entries categories above.
UK Corporate Provider Trophy
The winner of this award is selected from organizations or authorities entering ten or more different locations and winning five or more five-star awards.
Champions' League – Standards of Excellence Awards
This award is presented to organizations or local authorities winning five or more five-star awards and who, in the inspectors' opinion, are maintaining a consistently high standard of management in all their Loo of the Year Awards entries.
Local Authority Premier League
Membership in the League is granted to the top twenty local authority public toilet providers.
Washroom Technician of the Year Awards
These "people awards" are open to all full-time technicians, as well as employed washroom technicians and retained washroom technician contractors. Separate Washroom Technician of the Year Award Certificates are awarded in England, Scotland, Wales and Northern Ireland with Commended and National Winners for each country.

In addition, the overall UK winner (either an individual, in-house washroom technician teams or external washroom technician contractor teams) is awarded the UK Washroom Technician of The Year Trophy.

== Overall "Loo of the Year" trophy winners ==
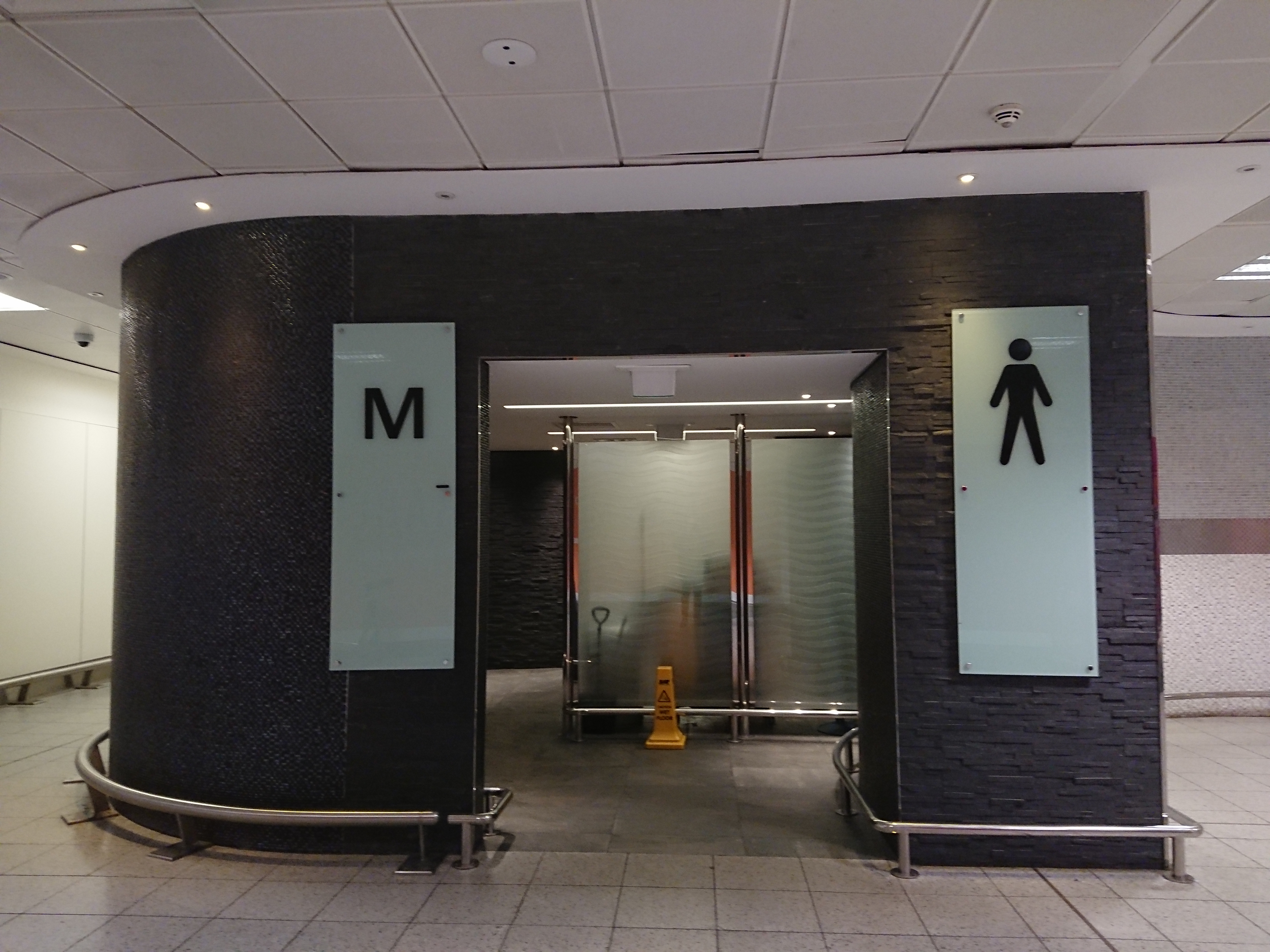
Gatwick Airport toilets in 2018; the airport was the 2016 "Loo of the Year" winner

The winner of this category is presented with a Golden Loo Seat Trophy.

| Year | Winner | Sector |
|---|---|---|
| 1987 | Hatton Gardens Hotel, Upton St Leonards | Hospitality |
| 1988 | The Lido, Worthing | Local Authority |
| 1989 | Children's World Stores | Retail |
| 1990 | Eagle and Child, Gwaenysgor, N.Wales | Hospitality |
| 1991 | Grampian Road, Aviemore, Scotland | Local Authority |
| 1992 | Welcome Break Services, M3, Farnborough | Transport |
| 1993 | No Competition | |
| 1994 | Heritage Motor Centre, Gaydon | Heritage |
| 1995 | City of Westminster Council | Local Authority |
| 1996 | Portsmouth Historic Dockyard | Heritage |
| 1997 | The Manor Hotel, St. Albans | Hospitality |
| 1998 | Eurotunnel, Folkestone | Transport |
| 1999 | The National Trust, Gibside Estate, Tyne & Wear | Heritage |
| 2000 | The Oracle, Reading | Retail |
| 2001 | JD Weatherspoon | Hospitality |
| 2002 | East Lothian Council, Scotland | Local Authority |
| 2003 | The Eden Project, Bodelva, Cornwall | Leisure |
| 2004 | The Highland Council, Scotland | Local Authority |
| 2005 | Moto Hospitality | Transport |
| 2006 | The Camping and Caravaning Club | Holiday Parks |
| 2007 | The Trafford Centre, Manchester | Retail |
| 2008 | Asda Stores | Retail |
| 2009 | McDonald's | Hospitality |
| 2010 | JD Wetherspoon | Hospitality |
| 2011 | Ceredigion County Council | Local Authority |
| 2012 | Staffordshire County Council | Local Authority |
| 2013 | Brighton & Hove City Council | Local Authority |
| 2014 | Danfo UK | Local Authority |
| 2015 | We Clean | Cleaning & FM |
| 2016 | Gatwick Airport | Transport |
| 2017 | ABM | Cleaning & FM |
| 2018 | J D Wetherspoon | Hospitality |
| 2019 | Intu | Retail |
| 2020 | Wychavon District Council | Local Authority |
| 2021 | Paultons Park | Leisure |
| 2022 | Mitie | Cleaning and Facility Management |
| 2023 | Hillcroft Holiday Park | Holiday Parks |
| 2024 | The Centre, Livingston | Retail |
| 2025 | St David's Dewi Sant Shopping Centre Cardiff | Retail |

== See also ==
- The Good Loo Guide
