= Lyca Radio =

UK commercial radio station targeting British Asians

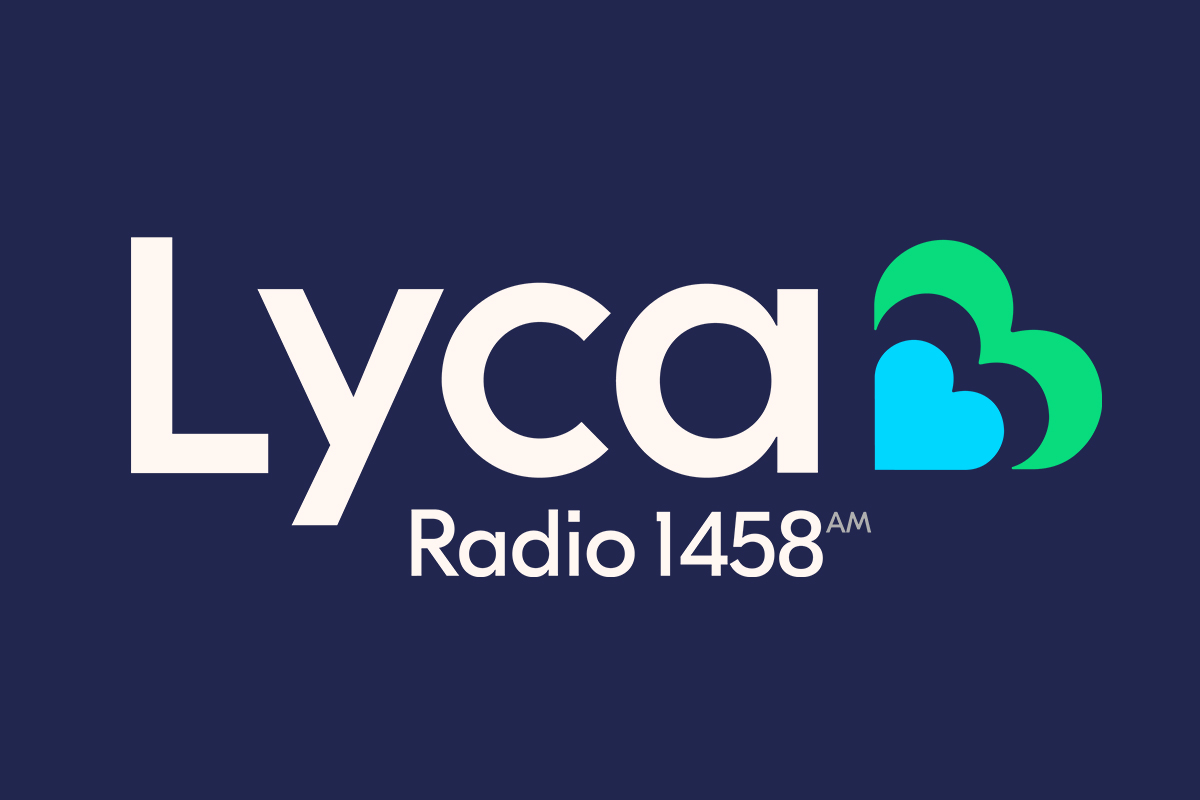
- London; United Kingdom
- Frequencies: MW: 1458 kHz (London - Brookmans Park); 963 kHz (Manchester - Haslington); 1377 kHz (Manchester - Ashton Moss); DAB: 11B [DRG LONDON]

Programming
- Format: Popular Asian hits, entertainment, community events & news
- Network: Lyca Radio Network

Ownership
- Owner: Lyca Group; (Lyca Media II Ltd)
- Sister stations: Lyca Gold (Greater London) Lyca Radio (Greater Manchester & West Yorks); Lyca Radio Midlands; Lyca Radio 90s Lyca Radio Ghazals; Lyca Radio Punjabi Lyca Xtra podcast

History
- First air date: 2014

Links
- Webcast: https://listen-lycaradio.sharp-stream.com/1458.mp3
- Website: www.lycaradio.com

Lyca Radio is a leading Asian commercial radio station in the United Kingdom. It broadcasts music and other content for South Asians living in the UK on 1458 medium wave (from Brookmans Park transmitting station) in Greater London, on 963 medium wave (from Haslington transmitting station) and on 1377 medium wave (from Ashton Moss transmitting station) in Greater Manchester, and on DAB Digital Radio in Leicester.

As of October 2026, Lyca Radio leads the Greater London market as the No.1 Commercial Asian Radio Station, with a reach of 170,000. It also leads as the No.1 Commercial Asian Radio Group, with a total audience of 217,000 with sister station, Lyca Gold Radio. (Q3/2026 data RAJAR)

Raj Baddhan, the Chief Executive Officer of Lyca Radio Network, has led the stations to new heights and now establishing Lyca Radio as the No.1 Commercial Asian Radio Station in Greater London. He was also behind the launch of Lyca Gold, the UK's first retro Asian music station, as well as the acquisition of Asian Sound Radio in Greater Manchester. Under his leadership, Lyca Radio Network dominates the London market with Lyca Radio, Lyca Gold and Lyca Group (combining the two stations), according to RAJAR Q3/26 data. Raj Baddhan was appointed as the CEO of the company in January 2021. He was named London's Most Influential in Asian Standard's Annual List (Media CEO) in 2024 and 2025.

Lyca Radio has been named Radio Station of the Year at the prestigious Asian Media Awards. It won the big prize in 2022, 2024 and 2026. Raj Baddhan was also named Radio Presenter of the Year at the ceremony in 2025.

== History ==
Lyca Radio launched in 2014 after Lyca Media, the company that owns mobile operator Lycamobile, purchased Sunrise Radio's license for frequency 1458 kHz. Sunrise was re-launched on the 963 and 972 AM frequencies.

On 22 April 2024, Lyca Radio Greater Manchester launched, following Lyca's acquisition of Asian Sound in 2023. The output mixes local content with some networked programming from London. In September 2026, its Greater Manchester output was expanded to West Yorkshire including Bradford, Huddersfield and Leeds on full-scale DAB.

On 11 October 2024, the station began broadcasting in Leicestershire. Its Leicestershire broadcast region was expanded to the rest of the Midlands with full-scale DAB in Birmingham, Leicestershire, Coventry, Derbyshire, Wolverhampton, Shropshire and Nottingham.

Lyca Radio Network also runs three digital-exclusive channels - Lyca Radio 90s, Lyca Radio Ghazals and Lyca Radio Punjabi. They are available only online via Lyca Radio's mobile app, Alexa and third-party apps.

== Sister stations ==
Lyca Gold is a sister station that broadcasts on 1035 AM and is billed as the UK's first retro Asian music station. It was launched in September 2021 as a rebranding and format change from Dilse Radio.

As of October 2026, Lyca Gold continued to lead as the No.1 Asian Retro Music Station with a reach of 98,000 (Q3/26). It has been leading the market since its inception.

Lyca Radio Network launched its own podcast, Lyca Xtra, to extend its British Asian speech content with social topics, round-table debates and interviews with business leaders. The podcast is available on all major streaming platforms including Spotify, Apple Podcasts, Google Podcasts, Amazon Music, YouTube, Audible, JioSaavn and Gaana.
