= Fix Radio =

- United Kingdom
- Broadcast area: United Kingdom
- Frequency: DAB: 11A Sound Digital
- Branding: The Builders Station

Programming
- Language: English
- Format: Vocational radio

History
- Founded: 2017; 9 years ago
- First air date: 26 April 2017

Links
- Website: www.fixradio.com

Brad Hanson during an outside broadcast for Fix Radio.

Fix Radio is a national digital radio station in the United Kingdom with associated websites, Facebook, YouTube and podcast channels. It has previously been the silver award winner of the 2023 UK Audio and Radio Industry Awards for best station sound. It broadcasts on DAB Digital Radio across the UK as well as online and mobile.

== Background ==
Fix Radio was founded by its current (as of 2023) CEO, Louis Timpany, to provide music, news and entertainment aimed at UK tradespeople. It went on-air at 7am on 26 April 2017 with the tagline "We're Nailing It!" and special guest Charlie Mullins. The first song played was Starship's "We Built This City". It specialises in trade focused content with dedicated painting and decorating, heating and plumbing, carpentry, plastering, and electrical shows.

Although it broadcasts 24 hours a day, only the hours of 6am to 10pm are produced "as live".

It was initially launched on DAB digital radio in London operating out of the Spectrum Radio building in Battersea.

2018 saw its first major expansion and the creation of Fix Media after a takeover of the Facebook group "Tradesman Banter," accompanied by a move to new studios in Angel, Islington.

Broadcasts expanded to cover Manchester on 14 January 2019 at 7am on the SSDAB minimux.

== Broadcasting nationwide ==
In March 2022 it was announced that the station would start broadcasting nationwide by joining Sound Digital's national DAB digital radio multiplex after securing a national broadcasting licence and £950,000 of crowdfunding. It launched nationally on 3 May 2022 and moved to new headquarters at the Vox studios in Vauxhall.

On 19 May 2023, Fix Radio confirmed it had signed a deal with TradePoint to sponsor the station's breakfast show, The Bald Builders Breakfast Show.

In November 2023, Louis Timpany, the founder and CEO of Fix Radio, won Creative Entrepreneur of the Year at the Great British Entrepreneur Awards in London.

On 7 December 2023, Fix Radio launched a poll to ask listeners if they wanted the station to play Christmas hits after its breakfast presenters had an on air discussion about whether it was too early for Christmas songs. The poll ran until 15 December, with the playlist from 18 December determined by its outcome.

On 29 October 2025, it was announced that business coach Craig Wilkinson would join Chance Litchfield on Fix Radio for a new regular feature on Snag the Week.

== Notable presenters ==
- Andy Hodgson (The Friday Sports Kick Off!)
- Clive Holland, former BBC TV and radio presenter
- The Bald Builders, Social media stars, radio presenters, hosts of The Bald Builders Breakfast.

== Notable former presenters ==
- Ugly Phil
- Russ Williams
- Jono Coleman

== Awards ==
Year	Work	Award	Category	Result	Ref.
2023	Ultimate Builders Portaloo	Loo of the Year of Award	Building and Construction	Won	
2023	The Bald Builders Breakfast	Audio and Radio Industry Awards	Best New Radio Show	Nominated	
2023	The Heating and Plumbing Show	Audio and Radio Industry Awards	Best New Radio Show	Nominated	
2023	Devaweb & Fix Radio	Audio and Radio Industry Awards	Best Station Sound	Silver	
2025	The Bald Builders Breakfast	Audio and Radio Industry Awards	Best Music Breakfast Show	Silver	
2025	Fix Radio	Audio and Radio Industry Awards	Best Sonic Branding	Gold	
2025	The Bald Builders Breakfast	The Audio Production Awards (THE APA'S)	Best Entertainment	Gold	
2025	Fix Radio	The Audio Production Awards (THE APA'S)	Network or Publisher Of The Year	Gold	
