= Jay Curtis =

Welsh broadcaster

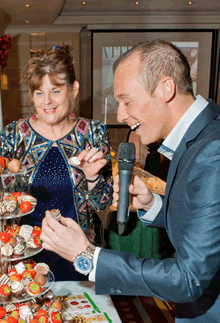
- Jay hosting awards ceremony
- Born: 28 March 1985 (age 41); Neath, Wales
- Occupation: Co-op Radio presenter
- Known for: Nation Hits, Radio Carmarthenshire, Scarlet FM, Radio Ceredigion
- Website: www.jaycurtis.co.uk

Jay Curtis (born 28 March 1985) is a Welsh broadcaster, columnist and occasional actor best known for his work as a Broadcaster and presenting on TV/Radio across Wales.

== Early media career ==
Curtis started work as a freelance reporter straight from school with Newsquest Media Group, writing for his local newspaper in South Wales.

It was during a Newspaper Interview that he was spotted by the late Ray Gravell during his Wyt Ti'n Siarad Grav Roadshow, and was later given the opportunity to join the broadcaster supporting him for the remainder of his Roadshow. This was followed by music events and tours across Wales such as the Big Buzz and Pop into the Park for BBC Radio Wales and BBC Radio Cymru. It was an encounter that sparked his interest in working in Commercial Radio.

== Early radio career ==
After working at various BBC events but with little On Air experience he was offered a role presenting on his local community radio station Afan FM 107.9, at various restricted service licence events, such as the Pontardawe Festival and Aberavon Beach Festival.

The station was later granted an FM licence, and re-branded XS Radio where he presented weekend shows, giving him the opportunity to hone is presenting skills and making him one of the youngest presenters on local radio in Wales. It was also where he recorded his demo tape which he sent to several local stations.

== Career ==
In January 2007, Curtis moved into commercial radio, joining Nation Broadcasting (formally Town & Country Broadcasting and began hosting the 'dual live' Drivetime Show on 102.1 Swansea Bay Radio and 106.3 Bridge FM. Some 10 years later, he remains a permanent voice in Wales having recently provided travel information, weather and showbiz on stations including KCFM in Hull and working on Nation Radio Wales, Nation Radio Scotland, Nation Radio London, and Your Radio.

Aside from being a broadcaster, he is also an experienced radio producer and his credits include producing shows for Pat Sharp, Tony Blackburn, Neil Fox Gareth Thomas and "The Most Wanted Chart show" - a syndicated radio show for selected commercial radio stations across the UK.

He's also a voice-over artist, providing his voice to high-profile TV and Radio Commercials across the UK, including becoming the 'Voice of Wales' for the tourism commercials 'Visit Wales' which were broadcast worldwide to promote the country to a global market as part of the Ryder Cup.

In March 2010, he returned to writing and began work as a Celebrity Columnist for Swansea Life Magazine, before going on to become a regular contributor to the Carmarthen Journal highlighting his weekly celebrity interviews and activity on radio, followed by a monthly column in County Life Magazine.

In 2018, Curtis also joined the presenter line-up at Co-op Radio, which reaches millions of customers each year and can also be heard on HSBC Radio in branches across the UK.

Away from the studio, Curtis is often seen presenting red carpet interviews for Welsh and English TV channels at events such as the BAFTA Cymru Awards, and high-profile film premieres across the UK.

== Television, film and theatre ==
Curtis has also appeared on both television and international film, with regular appearances in Pobol Y Cwm, and various other roles including the pilot episode of BBC drama Sherlock with Hartswood Films, leader of the Southrons in TV's Merlin and also Dr David Khalaf in Torchwood.

He has appeared alongside Keira Knightley, Sienna Miller, Matthew Rhys and Cillian Murphy in the movie Edge of Love and his other TV credits include his role as Sibstar in Mistresses along with Casualty and as himself on ITV2's The Xtra Factor and Big Brothers Little Brother. He's also worked on projects such as 'The Passion' alongside Michael Sheen and ‘ We‘re here because' with the National Theatre of Wales.

In 2010 he fronted the Sky 3D launch across the UK and was one of the faces behind its very first broadcast of Manchester United vs Chelsea on a range of media platforms including magazines, billboards, trains, busses, and the tube. Later in 2021, he appeared in the TV commercial for Volvo for the launch of their pure electric equivalent of the XC90 SUV.

Curtis also took part in the pilot game show with former You Bet and Stars in Their Eyes presenter Matthew Kelly called Shark Vs Bear, which was filmed at the Former ITV Wales studios at Culverhouse Cross and was positioned for Channel 4, however this format was altered in favour of The Bank Job.

Elsewhere, he is a regular in theatres across Wales, appearing in several family pantomimes and comedies, including Dandini in Cinderella and barrister Brogan-More in the series Witness for the Prosecution by Agatha Christie at the New Theatre, Cardiff alongside Honeysuckle Weeks (Foyle's War), Denis Lill (The Royal), Ben Nealon (Soldier, Soldier), Robert Duncan (Drop the Dead Donkey), Peter Byrne, Jennifer Wilson and Mark Wynter.

More recently he appeared on TV Gameshow 1000 Heartbeats hosted by Vernon Kay, and alongside Ben Shephard as a contestant on ITV's Tipping Point.

== Private life ==
Curtis still lives in Wales and regularly comperes a number of large scale music concerts and is often seen hosting major events such as the Welsh National Wedding Awards, Wales Hero Awards, and a variety of Fashion Shows for the South Wales Evening Post, and Maxine De Paris. He is also the regular stadium announcer for the Scarlets during home fixtures at the BT Sports Arena.

He also continues to support several charities, and is often seen hosting Race for Life, Rainbow Run events and recently took part in a 13,000 ft charity sky dive in aid of Harry's Fund, set up in memory of 5yr old boy Harry Nye Patterson. He also took part in the annual Wales pro celebrity match for Ty Hafan bringing together a team of celebrities and ex-professional sports players.

More recently he launched a travel-oriented YouTube Channel and "JC Explores" brand where his travel Vlogs have seen him searching for extraordinary experiences around the world including Dubai, Singapore, Hong Kong, Thailand, and more. This work was quickly picked up by travel brands such as Unilad adventure and shared with over 9 million followers. However, due to the global pandemic and restrictions to travel, his love of Wales has now become the main focus of his content.
