= Capital South Coast =

English radio station

Coordinates: 51.0895°N 1.2168°W

- Fareham; England
- Broadcast area: South Hampshire
- Frequencies: FM: 103.2 MHz; DAB: 11C
- RDS: CAPITAL
- Branding: The South Coast's No.1 Hit Music Station

Programming
- Format: Contemporary hit radio

Ownership
- Owner: Global
- Sister stations: Classic FM; Heart Solent

History
- First air date: 4 December 1988
- Last air date: 8 April 2019

Technical information
- Power: 1kW HP 1kW VP

Links
- Website: Capital South Coast

Capital South Coast was a regional radio station owned by operated by Global Radio as part of the Capital radio network. It broadcast to Hampshire from studios in Segensworth, Fareham. In 2019, Capital South Coast was replaced by Capital South following a merger with Capital Brighton.

== History ==
=== Radio Victory ===
Radio Victory launched as the first local commercial radio service in the South of England in 1975, transmitting to a small area around Portsmouth. The licence was re-advertised by the Independent Broadcasting Authority. The extended licence, now to include Southampton and Winchester, was won by Ocean Sound Ltd. Radio Victory ceased operations in June 1986, a couple of weeks earlier than the expiry date of its franchise, with a test transmission informing listeners of the closure.

=== Ocean Sound ===
Ocean Sound launched on 12 October 1986 from a new purpose-built broadcast unit, built in just a year, in a business park in Segensworth West, outside Fareham, Hampshire and near the M27 motorway, a strategic location to prevent bias towards the two major cities of Southampton and Portsmouth, as well as removing association with Radio Victory, who were Portsmouth biased, however, some staff were hired from Radio Victory, such as sales managers and a Head of News.

Two services were launched, Ocean Sound (West), using 103.2 MHz FM and 1557 kHz AM covering Southampton and Winchester, and Ocean Sound (East) using 97.5 MHz FM, moving from Radio Victory's 95.0 MHz FM, and 1170 kHz AM serving Portsmouth and the surrounding area. Two stations launched, rather than one station, as then Managing Director David Lucas identified two potential audiences, the East area familiar with commercial radio (in the East area) and the West area familiar with BBC, specifically the popular BBC station, BBC Radio Solent. The East area sounded livelier and there was a more soft sound for the West. The two stations were later joined by a separate service provided for Winchester and the surrounding areas on 96.7 MHz FM, entitled Ocean Sound (North) - The Light FM, launched on 6 December 1987.

The two original stations shared daytime output with specialist programmes for each station, such as a Saturday evening Isle of Wight programme with Jean-Paul Hansford on the West station on 103.2, while Guy Hornsby's Saturday Soul Club on East, with the North service having its own programmes initially between 6 am to 2 pm and then 5 pm to 9 pm also, but relayed West at other times. The new station's slogan was "We're on your wavelength."

In 1987, as part of IBA's demand to end simulcasting on FM and AM, the services were reorganised. The FM West service became Power FM and East service became Ocean Sound, with the respective AM services becoming The Gold AM. The North service became The Light FM.

=== Power FM ===
Power FM launched on Sunday 4 December 1988 at 10 am. Power FM was designed as a direct competitor to BBC Radio 1 in the area, with a heavy rotation of chart and Top 40 pop and mainstream dance, with quick hourly news and information. The station was a music-intensive approach designed to get at the emerging demand for chart music which wasn't available locally, whereas sister station Ocean Sound now provided significantly more speech, coupled with slightly older adult contemporary music. The opening presenter line-up included Pete Wardman, Bernie Simmons, Chris Kelly, Adrian Lovett, Chris Pearson and Judy James. The launch of Power FM was one hour after that of Ocean Sound and The Gold AM so that the presenters on Power could say that they were Britain's newest radio station.

Power FM went on to become a very popular radio station, hosting many events including Power in the Park on Southampton Common. Ten in all were held between 1995 and 2004. The station has had many notable presenters including Scott Mills, Jon Holmes, and Rick Jackson. Rick hosted the breakfast show for 11 years, starting as "Rick's Rude Awakening" in 1997 and then co-hosted with Ana Schofield, Rachel Brookes and Donna Alos along with 'street boy' Maximum Bob who joined the crew in 2001. Other presenters included Nik Goodman, Darren Parks, Mike'n'Rich, Des Paul, and Rik Scott.

== Mergers and acquisitions ==
In 1992, the station and its sister stations were subsequently merged with Sussex radio station Southern Sound to form Southern Radio plc, which was due to its location in a prosperous and commercially attractive area of England. The merger saw Ocean Sound and The Light FM merging to create Ocean Sound - Classic Hits, later Ocean FM, and The Gold AM and Southern Sound's AM frequencies merging to create South Coast Radio.

GCap era logo

In 1994, Capital Radio Group, looking for expansion possibilities, purchased Southern Radio plc, which led to on-air sound changes. Whilst sister-station Ocean FM would take on a softer sound, Power FM took on Capital FM's long-established, successful and highly polished sound, with news bulletins at the top of the hour finishing with the sentence "And that's the way it is at (time)". In 2005, GWR and Capital Radio Group merged to form GCap Media. In 2008, GCap Media was bought by Global Radio.

=== Galaxy South Coast ===
As part of the purchase of the station by Global Radio, Ashley Tabor announced on 16 September 2008 that Power would be rebranded and become part of Global's Galaxy Radio network on 22 November 2008. The station was rebranded one day early, 21 November at 3:45 pm, becoming Galaxy South Coast, despite listener concerns about the station networking from other areas of the UK and the reduced localness of its predecessor.

The station's share of audience dropped from 6% before the rebrand to 3.9% by May 2009.

Galaxy South Coast, as Power FM, went digital in 2003, airing on DAB digital radio in Southern Hampshire, along with sister stations Ocean FM, XFM and Gold (formerly Capital Gold), as well as Wave 105, Radio Hampshire (formerly The Saint), Traffic Radio (formerly broadcasting as Channel 9, which included Capital Disney, Southampton Hospital Radio and South City FM) and BBC Radio Solent.

In addition to airing on the former Power FM slot on the South Hampshire DAB multiplex, 2009 saw Galaxy South Coast added to DAB in Bournemouth, Cornwall, Kent, Exeter/Torbay, Plymouth and Sussex Coast, replacing chillout station Chill in these areas; at the same time, a number of other DAB areas switched away from Chill to carry Galaxy stations (generally Galaxy Digital).

=== Capital South Coast ===
The station was rebranded as 103.2 Capital FM on 3 January 2011 as part of a merger of Global Radio's Galaxy and Hit Music networks to form the nine-station Capital radio network. Breakfast presenters Zoe Hanson and Paul Gillies retained their jobs with the relaunched station while Adam Inker moved from his weekday afternoon timeslot to host drivetime. The new station also saw the introduction of a new presenter of weekend mornings, Christian Williams, the former weekend overnight Hit Music network presenter based at Trent FM in Nottingham. The "FM" has since been dropped on air and is simply known as 103.2 Capital.

On 26 February 2019, Global confirmed the station would be merged with Capital Brighton. From Monday 8 April 2019, local output will consist of a three-hour Drivetime show on weekdays, alongside news bulletins, traffic updates and advertising.

The station's local breakfast and weekend shows were replaced with network programming from London. All of Capital South Coast's local presenters left the station.

== Former notable presenters ==
- Dave Berry
- Jon Holmes
- Sacha Brooks
- Rich Clarke
- Will Cozens
- Jason Donovan
- David Dunne
- Andi Durrant
- Marvin Humes
- Dave Kelly
- Myleene Klass
- Mike'n'Rich
- Jeremy Kyle
- Andy Collins
- Scott Mills
- Mark Ovenden
- Chris Pearson
- Adele Roberts
- Ryan Seacrest
- Lisa Snowdon
- Steve Sutherland
- Margherita Taylor
- Tiësto
- Graham Torrington
- Pete Wardman
- Leona Graham

== Capital Breakfast ==
Power FM Flying Eye (Piper Cherokee)

Until April 2019, the flagship programme aired on weekdays from 6 am until 10 am on Capital South Coast, titled Capital Breakfast. It was last presented by Jono Holmes (replacing Tom Deacon) and Emma Jo Real-Davis. Tom Deacon left in December 2016 after 18 months to go back to comedy. Paul Gillies and Emily Segal previously were the presenters until June 2015. Gillies joined the station, as Power FM, in September 2007, having previously worked at Capital London. Segal replaced Zoe Hanson in January 2013, who moved to present on South Coast sister station Heart.

Until November 2010, they were joined by Mark 'Sparky' Colerangle a second co-presenter and travel reader. Traffic reports are broadcast every fifteen minutes from the Travel Centre between 6.30 am until 9 am, with drivers calling in to alert listeners of any problems, as well as Roadcrew reports from the Thunders. Travel previously took place from the Flying Eye, sponsored by O2, which flew at 2500 feet above the South of England in a light aircraft based at Southampton Airport. For many years in the mid-1990s, the Flying Eye reporter was Spencer Kelly (real name Spencer Bignell), known as Commander Kelly, who went on to present Ocean FM breakfast and now presents Click on the BBC News Channel.

The show was previously presented by Rick Jackson, the longest-serving member of the show, joining in 1996, Ana Schofield. Rachel Brookes later replaced by Donna Alos, and Bob Diggles, known on air as Maximum Bob, until July 2007. Another regular member of the team was Handy Andy the Producer, an "expert" guitar player, who organised an unofficial song for England during Euro 2004, sold in shops across Hampshire.

== Live Events ==
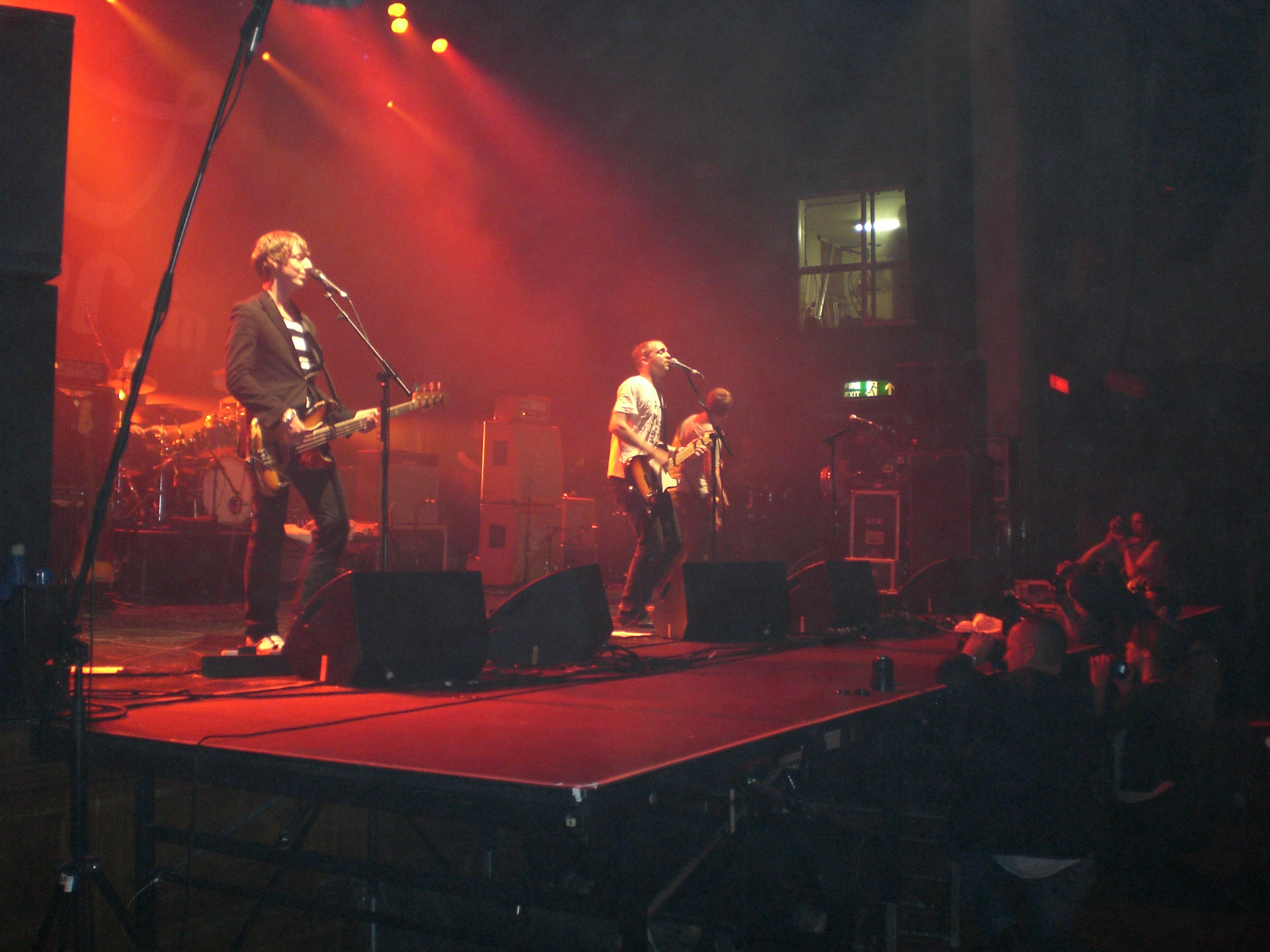
Travis performing at Power Amped 3.

Power Amped was a series of three rock-style concerts held by the radio station at Southampton Guildhall as a successor to Power in the Park.

- Power Amped 1 = El Presidente, Kubb, The Delays, Embrace
- Power Amped 2 = GunAngel (a school band that won a competition to open the concert), Captain, Vega4, The Zutons
- Power Amped 3 = The Hoosiers, The Twang, Travis
- Power in the Park ran for 10 years and was held at southampton common

In 2008, Power FM had another live event, Power Jam.

As Galaxy South Coast:

- Love Music: Live! = Alesha Dixon, Tinchy Stryder, JLS, Booty Luv and Taio Cruz (who pulled out due to voice issues)

As Galaxy South Coast & 103.2 Capital:

- Other events the station have promoted and run competitions for tickets included the Capital London's Summertime Ball and Jingle Bell Ball in 2009, 2010 (as Galaxy FM) and from 2011 as part of the Capital network held at The O2 Arena (London) in early June and December, respectively.

More recently they have had a presence at, and had ticket giveaways for local festivals Bestival, Isle of Wight Festival and Common People Festival. And new for 2016, a Halloween themed night "Capital's Monster Mash Up" and "Capital Up-Close" featuring Justin Timberlake.

== Slogans ==
- 1986 - Ocean Sound - We're on your Wavelength!
- 1989 - The Gold AM - Go for Gold; The Light FM - Turn on the Light
- 1992 - Power FM - More Music; South Coast Radio - Light and Easy
- 1996 - Power FM - The South's Number One Hit Music Station
- 2003 - Power FM - Today's Best Music
- 2008 - Power FM - Fresh Music First
- 2008 - Galaxy South Coast - Love Music
- 2010 - Galaxy South Coast - The South Coast's No.1 Hit Music Station
- 2011 to 2019 - 103.2 Capital FM - The South Coast's No.1 Hit Music Station

== Transmitters ==
=== Analogue (FM) ===
Transmitter Site	Frequency	Power	RDS Name	PI Code	Area
Chillerton Down	103.2 MHz	2000W	Capital_	C870	Southern Hampshire

=== Digital (DAB) ===
Multiplex Name	Bitrate	Short Label	Long Label	Sld
NOW Bournemouth	112kbit/s	Capital	Capital	C870
NOW South Hampshire	112kbit/s	Capital	Capital	C870
