= Isle of Wight Radio =

- Newport; United Kingdom
- Broadcast area: Isle of Wight
- Frequencies: 102.0 FM; 107.0 FM
- RDS: IW RADIO

Programming
- Format: Adult Contemporary

Ownership
- Owner: Nation Broadcasting; (Isle of Wight Radio Ltd)

History
- First air date: 15 April 1990; 36 years ago
- Former frequencies: 1242 kHz

Technical information
- Transmitter coordinates: 50.6491°N 1.3290°W

Links
- Website: Official Website

Isle of Wight Radio is an Independent Local Radio station in Newport on the Isle of Wight. The station began transmitting on 1242 kHz from Briddlesford Farm AM transmitter on 15 April 1990. Isle of Wight Radio switched to FM in March 1998, its main transmitter is at Chillerton Down on 107FM, with three low power relays on 102FM in Cowes, Ventnor and Ryde.

As of September 2026, the station broadcasts to a weekly audience of 29,000 with a listening share of 10.2%, according to RAJAR.

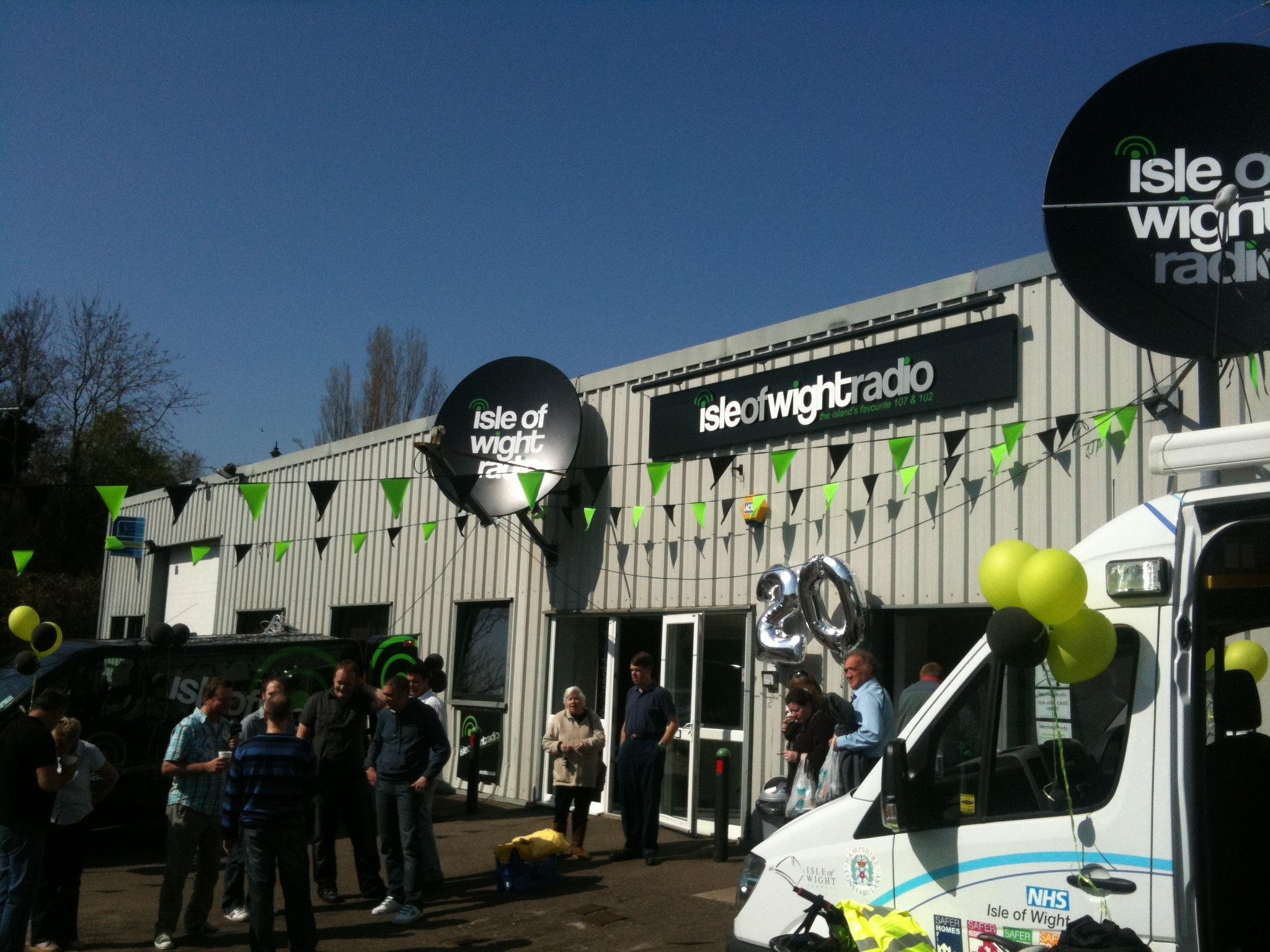
Isle of Wight Radio's 20th birthday celebrations

== History ==
=== Ownership ===
Isle of Wight Radio was founded by Islanders Jean-Paul Hansford and Stephen Oates. It was independently owned for two years before being purchased by GWR (now Global Radio) and then by The Local Radio Company (TLRC). The station then came under the control of a joint venture between TLRC and the Portsmouth FC, under the name of Quadrant Media Limited, which also owned Spirit FM in Chichester and 107.4 The Quay in Portsmouth. In August 2009, the station was sold in a management buyout by programme controller Paul Topping, Claire Willis, Ian Walker and Hedley Finn, making it independently owned again.

In October 2012, it was announced that the station, alongside local Beacon magazine which it owns, was to merge with Media Sound Holdings, now Total Sense Media, owner of Splash FM, Bright FM, Arrow FM and Sovereign FM, the latter two being former sister stations under TLRC. The merger involved the station's shareholders taking shares in Media Sound Holdings, with Willis and Finn joining the board. It was said that staffing would not be affected with continued broadcast from the Isle of Wight and no plans for content sharing amongst the stations, although this could be considered in future for off-peak hours.

It was owned and operated by Total Sense Media until its sale to Nation Broadcasting was announced on 1st September 2026.

=== Digital radio ===
Following the successful bid for a superlocal smallscale DAB licence from a consortium headed by Total Sense Media and Vectis Radio, a dedicated digital multiplex for the island launched on 18 April 2026, carrying services including IoW Radio as on FM and a new digital-only sister station, Isle of Wight Radio Retro, playing music principally from the 1970s, 1980s and 1990s, similar in scope to (and sharing much programming with) More Radio Retro, which TSM had operated on DAB in Sussex since 2021.

On 1 October 2026, DAB+ broadcasts of Isle of Wight Radio migrated to the NOWdigital South Hampshire local DAB multiplex, which can be widely received across the island and IOWR Retro (and More Radio Retro) ceased broadcasting; the freed-up capacity on the Isle of Wight superlocal DAB multiplex was reportedly used to make Nation 60s and Nation 70s available to listeners on the island following the earlier addition of these stations to Portsmouth and Southampton's smallscale multiplexes. There was no change to FM or online availability of Isle of Wight Radio.
