= Heart South =

British radio station

- Fareham; United Kingdom
- Broadcast area: South East England
- Frequencies: FM: Kent: 95.9 (Margate and Sandwich), 96.1 (Ashford); 97.0 (Dover), 102.8 (Canterbury); 103.1 (Maidstone and Medway): Hampshire and Dorset: 96.7 (Southampton and Winchester); 97.5 (Isle of Wight, Chichester and Portsmouth); 102.3 (Bournemouth, Poole, Christchurch and Weymouth): Sussex and Surrey: 96.9 (Peacehaven); 97.5 (Horsham); 102 (Hastings and Bexhill-on-Sea); 102.4 (Heathfield); 102.7 (Redhill, Reigate and Crawley); 103.5 (Brighton and Hove and Worthing): Thames Valley: 97.0 (Reading), 97.4 (Banbury and Brackley), 102.6 (Oxford and Oxfordshire); 102.9 (West Berkshire); 103.4 (Henley-on-Thames): DAB: 10B: (Oxfordshire), 10B: (Sussex and Portsmouth), 10C: (Surrey, North Sussex and South London), 11B: (Dorset), 11C: (Kent), 11C: (Hampshire and West Sussex), 12D: (Berkshire, North Hampshire and Abingdon), RDS: Heart
- Branding: This is Heart

Programming
- Format: Hot Adult Contemporary
- Network: Heart

Ownership
- Owner: Global
- Sister stations: Capital South

Links
- Website: (Localised Heart South sites) Berkshire; Crawley; Dorset; Hampshire; Kent; Oxfordshire; Sussex

Heart South is a regional radio station owned and operated by Global as part of the Heart network. It broadcasts to the south and south east of England.

The station launched on 3 June 2019 as a result of a merger between four sister stations: Heart Solent, Heart Kent, Heart Sussex and Surrey and Heart Thames Valley. The station ceased on 21 February 2025.

== History ==
Under relaxed OFCOM requirements for local content on commercial radio, Heart South is permitted to share all programmes between seven licences located in the ITV Meridian broadcast region.

Previously, these licences broadcast as separate stations:

- Radio 210 began broadcasting from Reading in March 1976, serving Berkshire and north Hampshire.
- 2CR - Two Counties Radio began broadcasting from Bournemouth in September 1980, serving east Dorset and west Hampshire.
- Southern Sound began broadcasting from Portslade, near Brighton, in August 1983, serving East Sussex and parts of West Sussex.
- Invicta Radio began broadcasting to Kent in October 1984, initially from studios in Canterbury and Maidstone, before moving to Whitstable in 1991. Over the years, the station provided opt-out programming for the East and West of the county - at one point, extending to separate breakfast shows for Ashford and Thanet.
- Radio Mercury began broadcasting from Crawley in October 1984, serving east Surrey and north Sussex.
- Ocean Sound began broadcasting to south Hampshire, West Sussex and the Isle of Wight in October 1986, after taking over the licence previously held by Radio Victory. Initially providing separate programming for the East and West of the area, it also ran a split service for the Winchester area called The Light FM.
- Fox FM began broadcasting to Oxfordshire in September 1989.

Ocean Sound's West service was split off into Power FM in December 1988 - with the parent service, later known was Ocean FM continuing for the East and North areas.

In 1992, Ocean merged with Southern Sound (latterly Southern FM) to form the Southern Radio Group with the two stations largely sharing output. The company went onto purchase Invicta Radio in 1992, before being brought by Capital Radio plc in 1994.

By 2005, all seven stations entered common ownership when GWR Group merged with Capital to form GCap Media, which in turn was taken over by Global in 2008.

In 2009, six of the stations were rebranded as part of a rollout of the Heart network across 29 local radio stations owned by Global. Fox FM and 2-Ten FM relaunched in March, followed by 2CR, Invicta, Ocean FM, Southern FM. By this point, local programming had been reduced to ten hours on weekdays and four hours at weekends.

During the summer of 2010, Global merged six of the stations into three - with Mercury FM joining the Heart network as a result:

- Heart Solent - formed from the Dorset and Hampshire stations, broadcasting from Fareham
- Heart Sussex and Surrey - formed from Mercury FM and Heart's Sussex station, broadcasting from Portslade
- Heart Thames Valley - formed from the Berkshire and Oxfordshire stations, broadcasting from Reading

Heart Kent retained its local programming - but across all stations, local output was further cut to seven hours on weekdays. Localised news bulletins, traffic updates and advertising continued to air as opt-outs.

On 26 February 2019, following OFCOM's decision to relax local content obligations from commercial radio, Global announced it would merge the four stations in the South and South East into one.

From 3 June 2019, regional programming consisted of three hours on weekdays, alongside localised news bulletins, traffic updates and advertising. Local breakfast and weekend shows were replaced with network programming from London.

Global's studio centres in Portslade, Reading and Whitstable were closed, although local newsgathering and sales staff were retained. Across the four stations, fourteen local presenters left the Heart network.

As of 24 February 2025 all programming originates from Global's London headquarters, including Heart Drive, presented each weekday by JK and Kelly Brook.

== News ==
Localised news bulletins air hourly for Berkshire, Dorset, Hampshire, Kent, Oxfordshire, Sussex and Surrey from 6 am-7 pm on weekdays and 6 am-12 pm at weekends.
