= Heart Hampshire =

Former British radio station

England
- Broadcast area: South Hampshire, West Sussex (excluding Worthing) and The Isle of Wight
- Frequencies: FM: 96.7 (Southampton and Winchester); 97.5 (Portsmouth and West Sussex); DAB: 11C

Programming
- Format: Adult contemporary

Ownership
- Owner: Global Radio

History
- First air date: 12 October 1986

Links
- Website: heart.co.uk/southcoast/

Heart Hampshire (formerly Ocean FM and Ocean Sound) is a British Independent Local Radio station serving South Hampshire, West Sussex (excluding Worthing) and The Isle of Wight primarily for Portsmouth, Southampton, Winchester and Chichester. The station serves an area of England with a high proportion of commuters to London and a higher-than-average disposable income from middle-class families and people over 45. Its target age range is 25–45.

== History ==
Ocean Sound's predecessor, Radio Victory provided the first local commercial radio service in the South of England in 1975, with its small transmission area around Portsmouth. The station was disliked by the then regulator the Independent Broadcasting Authority, and when it re-advertised the Portsmouth licence to include Southampton and Winchester, Victory lost out to a new consortium called Ocean Sound Ltd. Ocean Sound proposed an expanded coverage area taking in Southampton. Radio Victory ceased operations in June 1986, three months earlier than the expiry date of its franchise, with a test transmission informing listeners of the unprecedented situation. Ocean Sound took over programme provision that October from a new purpose-built broadcast unit in a business park at Segensworth West on the western outskirts of Fareham, Hampshire.

Ocean Sound debuted on 12 October 1986, initially with two services – Ocean Sound (West), covering Southampton, Winchester and much of the Isle of Wight, and Ocean Sound (East) serving Portsmouth and the surrounding area. Ocean Sound (West) used 103.2 MHz FM and 1557 kHz AM. Ocean Sound (East) used 97.5 MHz FM and 1170 kHz AM. The East service underwent a change of frequency from that inherited from Radio Victory (from 95.0 MHz to 97.5 MHz FM). Both services shared breakfast and evening programmes with daytime output and specialist programmes broadcasting uniquely on each service – for instance on Saturday evenings, an Isle of Wight programme with Jean-Paul Hansford would air on Ocean Sound (West)'s FM frequency, while an alternative, Guy Hornsby's Saturday Soul Club would air on Ocean Sound (East) and the AM transmitter of Ocean Sound (West). This was prior to the termination of simulcasting programmes on FM and AM, which would see both services transformed.

The reason that two stations launched, rather than an expanded solo station is that then managing director David Lucas identified two potential audiences: one familiar with commercial radio (in the East area), and one largely acquainted with the BBC (the West area, of which the majority of local listening was to BBC Radio Solent). Ocean Sound (East) therefore sounded livelier than its West counterpart, which took on a softer sound.

=== New Studios ===
Once the franchise was won, Ocean Sound needed brand-new state of the art studios in Segensworth West, a district outside Fareham, beside the M27 motorway in Hampshire. This move to base themselves outside the two major cities of Southampton and Portsmouth was a strategic one, so as not to appear sounding biased in favour of either city and to remove any lingering associations with Radio Victory, primarily focused on Portsmouth.

The following is an excerpt of a 1986 interview with then managing director David Lucas in an Independent Broadcasting Authority publication:

"The original plan was to have studio buildings and offices in both Portsmouth and Southampton,' says Lucas. 'But that is an unnecessarily complicated way of doing the job. The important thing is for the programmes themselves to provide a strong and relevant local identity. Contribution studios have been established in both Portsmouth and Southampton to provide direct city-centre access to the airwaves for interviewees and guests."

"...But Lucas, like some other radio managers, wonders whether the high standards of IBA studio specifications are always necessary. 'A significant proportion of studio costs comes in sound-proofing them'; says Lucas. 'Would it really matter if the listener heard the occasional lorry rumbling past outside? With most stations operating on close mic techniques anyway, peripheral noise can be minor'".

Once the studios were complete, staff needed to be hired – almost from scratch. Sales managers and a Head of News were all recruited, ironically from Radio Victory. Construction of the new studios took under a year and finished in time for the station's launch in 1986.

On 6 December 1987, Ocean Sound's coverage area was extended with an additional service covering the Winchester area. Entitled Ocean Sound (North) – The Light FM, this would relay the Ocean Sound West service, with locally focused news, travel and programmes during the morning, early afternoon and early evening. Ocean Sound North could be heard on 96.7 MHz FM.

=== The Gold, The Power and The Light ===
1988 saw Ocean Sound undergo a massive re-organisation of its frequencies and services. The main changes were:

- Ocean Sound (East and North) on FM would become FM-only and simply renamed Ocean Sound and The Light FM
- Ocean Sound (West) on FM would become Power FM
- Ocean Sound on AM would become The Gold AM

The Gold AM launched on its mediumwave transmitters, effectively permanently separating from its FM counterpart. An all-oldies format playing 1960s and 1970s pop music, it won the right to use the name after a court battle with County Sound, a station originating from Guildford, Surrey, selected County Sound GOLD, later resulting in the Surrey station adopting its First Gold Radio moniker. Ocean Sound and The Light FM continued as before on 97.5 and 96.7 MHz FM, whilst Ocean Sound (West) relaunched as a music-intensive youth pop station – 103.2 Power FM on 4 December 1988. Power FM was designed as a direct competitor to BBC Radio 1 in the area, with a heavy rotation of chart and Top 40 pop and mainstream dance, with quick hourly news and information. It aimed to win over Radio 1 listeners who were frustrated by the fact that the BBC station would remain on mediumwave only in the area until May 1990, despite the fact that in the autumn of 1988 it was regularly plugging its new FM transmitters, sometimes giving the impression that it could already be heard on FM throughout the UK. The services were, however, 24 hours a day and overnights were a single programme with the DJ not identifying the service and separate jingles playing to the correct transmitter to give the impression that the listener was still tuned to the service for that frequency.

=== Mergers, takeovers and relaunches ===
Sussex radio station Southern Sound looked upon Ocean Sound as a potential takeover target, citing its location in a prosperous and commercially attractive area of England. So in 1992 a merger was agreed forming Southern Radio Holdings plc, which would see the following further changes to Ocean Sound:

- Ocean Sound and The Light FM would unite as Ocean Sound – Classic Hits (later abbreviated just to Ocean FM)
- Power FM would continue as before
- The Gold AM would merge with Southern Sound's AM frequencies to create South Coast Radio.

Ocean FM was reduced to an opt-out service from the main Sussex station, sharing output for most of the day with local news every half-hour at breakfast and drivetime. South Coast Radio would take on a much more relaxed sound with the slogan "Light and Easy", playing mostly Easy Listening and soft Gold hits.

In 1994, Capital Radio, looking for expansion possibilities, opted to purchase Southern Radio plc, which included Ocean Sound, now renamed Ocean FM. This led to more changes, this time to the on-air sound rather than name changes. Whilst Power FM took on Capital FM's long-established, successful and highly polished sound, Ocean FM became a more music-led station, playing heavy rotation soft adult contemporary hits, with its news and information sequences reduced in length and finishing with the sentence "And that's the way it is at [time check]".

In 1997, the Capital Radio Group along with the GWR Group sought Radio Authority approval to reduce the amount of local programming on its AM stations, affecting South Coast Radio. This would mean the station would be opting-out of a main service based in London. There Capital Gold was launched in place of South Coast Radio, with four hours programming locally produced, usually either at breakfast or drivetime.

In 1998, Ocean FM was a key target for newly launched Wave 105, a similar-sounding commercial radio station also playing adult contemporary music. Launched by former Ocean Sound managing director David Lucas, Wave 105 would curiously base itself in Segensworth East, a few hundred metres away from Ocean FM in Segensworth West.

Meanwhile, Ocean FM would be part of a network of AC stations, including Invicta FM and Fox FM. In 2000, this was re-organised to be part of the Century FM network, playing current AC music with a slogan of Number 1 for 80s, 90s and Now!

=== Ocean in the 2000s ===
With fiercely loyal listenership to BBC Radio Solent, direct competition from Original 106, Wave 105 and BBC Radio 2, Dream 107.2, Radio Hampshire (formerly SouthCity FM & The Saint) and a failed revival of Radio Victory (later 107.4 The Quay), Ocean was still a well-known brand and regularly featured among the better-performing local music stations. It was such a strong name that GCap Media bosses refused to re-brand the station as Century FM along usual radio network lines, and the station only broadcast special network shows.

Ocean went digital in 2003, airing on DAB digital radio in South Hampshire, West Sussex and the Isle of Wight, along with sister stations Power FM and Capital Gold; competitors Wave 105, The Saint, BBC Radio Solent; and new stations Capital Disney and XFM.

In May 2006, Ocean dropped the 'FM' from its previous 'Ocean FM' name to become just 'Ocean', simultaneously introducing a new set of logos and the tagline Hampshire's Greatest Hits. In June 2007 the use of 'Ocean FM' was introduced back into the output in addition to a new tagline Classic Hits and the Best New Songs. However the website still used the Hampshire's Greatest Hits tag. Around the same time, Ocean did not renew the contracts of long term Presenters Richard Williams, Pippa Head, James Macdonald and Australian import Warren Kay and more automation and networking was implemented.

Ocean also had their own charity, Help a Local Child. It launched in 2003 with a commitment to helping local children and young people up to the age of 18, who experience the negative effects of poverty, abuse, neglect, homelessness, violence, crime, illness and disability in the area. They frequently held fund raising events from car boot sales to themed discos with competitions.

=== Heart rebranding ===
In 2008, it was announced that Ocean FM, along with 30 other stations in the One Network, would be rebranded Heart by owners Global Radio. Ocean FM was amongst the final phase of stations to be rebranded, becoming Heart Hampshire on 22 June 2009.

=== Network restructuring ===
On 21 June 2010, Global Radio announced plans to merge Heart Hampshire with Heart Dorset & New Forest as part of plans to reduce the Heart network of stations from 33 to 16. The new station, Heart South Coast, began broadcasting from Fareham on 30 July 2010.

== See also ==
- Galaxy South Coast
- Heart Sussex
- Wave 105
- Gold
- Global Radio
- 107.4 The Quay
- Play Radio
- The Coast (radio station)
