= 107.8 FM =

FM radio frequency

The following radio stations broadcast on FM frequency 107.8 MHz:

== Israel ==
- Radio Al-Nas in the Northern District

== United Kingdom ==
- Academy FM in Ramsgate
- Easy Radio South Coast in Southampton
- Greatest Hits Radio Harrogate and The Yorkshire Dales in Craven
- More Radio Hastings in Hastings and Bexhill
- Radio Jackie in South West London
- Sunshine Radio in Leominster
- The Voice in Bideford, Ilfracombe and surrounding areas
