= Radio Ceredigion =

Former local radio station in Ceredigion, Wales

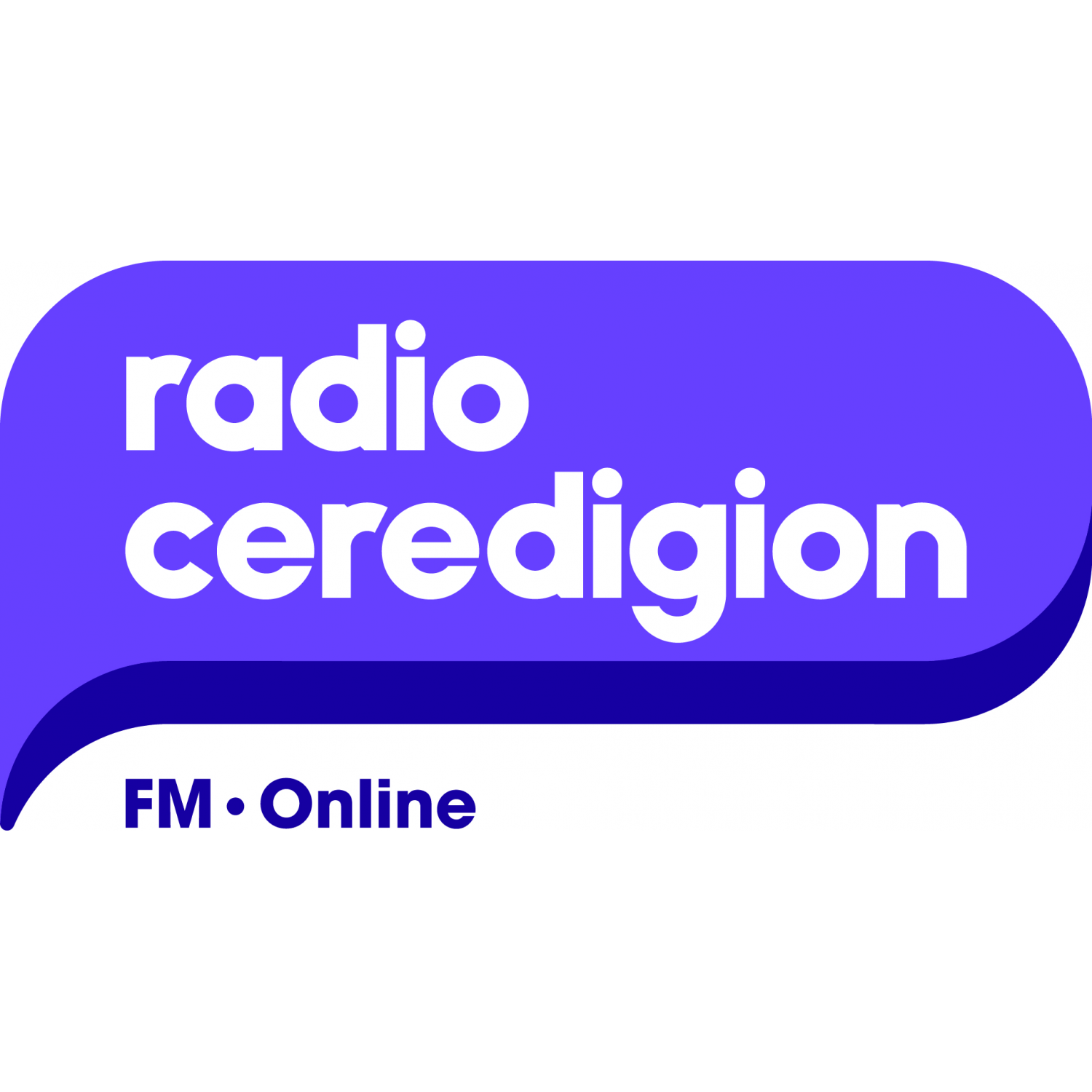
- United Kingdom
- Broadcast area: Ceredigion
- Frequencies: FM: 96.6 MHz (Lampeter); 97.4 MHz (Cardigan); 103.3 MHz (Aberystwyth)

Programming
- Format: Adult Contemporary

Ownership
- Owner: Nation Broadcasting

History
- First air date: 14 December 1992
- Last air date: 31 May 2019

Links
- Website: Nation Radio

Radio Ceredigion (Welsh pronunciation: [ˈradjɔ kɛrɛˈdɪɡjɔn]) was an Independent Local Radio station that was broadcast to Ceredigion. It was broadcast across the county on 96.6, 97.4 and 103.3 FM.

On 31 May 2019 the station became a relay of Nation Radio Wales.

== History ==
From its launch on Monday 14 December 1992, the station broadcast a bilingual schedule with roughly half English and half Welsh output, much of it community-orientated, from studios and offices at the Old Welsh School in Alexandra Road, Aberystwyth.

On 9 March 2010, Radio Ceredigion's owners Tindle Newspaper Group announced that the station would be sold off to the Welsh radio group Town and Country Broadcasting. At 9 am on 19 April 2010, broadcasting ceased from its Aberystwyth studios and switched to Town and Country's West Wales studios in Narberth, Pembrokeshire (also the base for Radio Pembrokeshire and Radio Carmarthenshire). After a short transition period, a daytime programming service was launched.

A proposal to reduce Welsh language programming on the station from 50% to 10% was rejected by the broadcasting regulator OFCOM in 2011 but subsequently permitted following further requests. As of March 2016, Radio Ceredigion aired a one-hour Welsh language music show on Sunday nights.

In September 2016, Nation Broadcasting announced plans to relocate Radio Ceredigion and its two sister services from the Narberth studios to the group's headquarters near the St Hilary transmitter on the outskirts of Cowbridge. The station switched broadcasting to the St Hilary studios at 10 am on Tuesday 22 November 2016, although the Narberth site was retained as a regional sales and production office.

In December 2018, OFCOM announced it had granted Nation's request to close Radio Ceredigion and replace it with a straight relay of its regional service, Nation Radio. Five months later, it was reported Nation had decided to retain the local service and would request to reverse its decision on the station's format.

But in May 2019, Nation Broadcasting withdrew its format change request and preceded with its original plan to relay Nation Radio. Radio Ceredigion ceased broadcasting on 31 May 2019.

On 31 July 2025, Nation Radio ceased broadcasting on the former Radio Ceredigion FM frequencies after handing back its licence to OFCOM.

=== Coverage ===
Radio Ceredigion had a total service area population of 74,000 people, and the station could be heard from Bangor through to Cross Hands, including parts of Powys, Carmarthenshire and Pembrokeshire. The main transmitter was located at Blaenplwyf transmitting station near Aberystwyth and broadcast on 103.3 FM, with relay stations at Mynydd Pencarreg transmitting station near Lampeter on 96.6FM and Penwaun near Cardigan on 97.4 FM.

== See also ==
- List of Celtic-language media

== General References ==
- An application for the Ceredigion FM licence from Radio Ceredigion Ltd
- Reference Offer for the provision of Transmission Services in respect of Re-advertisement of FM local commercial radio licence for Ceredigion
