= Mark Collins (broadcaster) =

English radio presenter (born 1961)

- Born: Mark Collins; 14 March 1962 (age 64); West London
- Occupation: Radio presenter
- Years active: 1980s–present

Mark Collins (born March 1962) is an English broadcaster, primarily known for his long-running morning radio shows on Wave 105 (from 1998 to 2024) and Nation Radio UK (from 2025).

== Early life ==
Collins was born in West London, brought up in Keynsham, between Bath and Bristol, and attended the Wellington School, Somerset.

== Radio career ==
Collins has had a long and distinguished career as a national and local radio presenter.

He had already worked for several independent local radio stations including Chiltern Radio Network and Red Dragon FM before joining Wave 105 soon after its launch in 1998. He presented the mid morning show for many years and popularised the Golden Hour and a daily 'Weekday Link' feature. During his time at Wave he often participated in charity events to raise money for the station's Cash for Kids charity.

Following the Bauer Media Group acquisition of Wave 105 the local station was swallowed into the nationally networked Greatest Hits Radio in 2024 and Collins was given the locally opted out afternoon slot. After only six months and changes to UK radio regulations removing networked stations' commitments to local programming Collins was released.

He immediately followed many of his old Wave 105 colleagues and joined the rapidly expanding Nation Radio UK network from January 2025.

He currently presents the daily Golden Hour on Nation Radio South and the 10-1pm weekday morning show across several regions in the Nation Radio UK network.as well as other shows at the weekend.

== TV work ==
Collins is a railway enthusiast and has presented programmes about trains on Discovery UK

== Personal life ==
Collins lives in Southsea, Hampshire. He is a big fan of Bruce Springsteen and an ardent supporter of Liverpool Football Club.
