= More Radio Eastbourne =

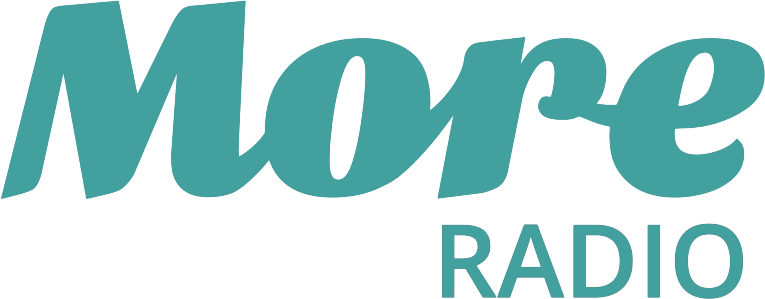
- England
- Broadcast area: Eastbourne & Hailsham
- Frequency: 107.5 MHz

Programming
- Format: Adult Contemporary

Ownership
- Owner: Nation Broadcasting
- Sister stations: More Radio Hastings; More Radio Mid-Sussex; More Radio Worthing; Isle of Wight Radio; Nation Radio South

History
- First air date: 17 November 1997
- Former names: Sovereign Radio; Sovereign FM

Technical information
- Transmitter coordinates: 50.7917°N 0.2404°E

Links
- Webcast: Listen Live
- Website: More Radio

More Radio Eastbourne, formerly Sovereign FM, is an Independent Local Radio station serving Eastbourne, Hailsham, Polegate and surrounding areas. It is owned and operated by Nation Broadcasting and broadcasts from studios in Burgess Hill, as part of a network of stations across Sussex.

== History ==
A completely unrelated 'temporary' radio station Sovereign Radio was founded in Eastbourne in 1992 by local radio enthusiasts Mark Briggs and Matthew Wheeler, who established restricted service licence (RSL) trial broadcasts in December 1992 and the summer of 1993. The second RSL was based on board an old ferry from the Shetland Islands called the Earl of Zetland, which was temporarily moored in Sovereign Harbour. Some of the station's original presenters included Gavin Lawrence, Paul Martin, Terry James and Zora Suleman. The broadcasts were part of a campaign to demonstrate viability to the Radio Authority (a legacy regulator now part of Ofcom) to advertise a full licence.

The full licence for the Eastbourne and Hailsham area was eventually awarded in 1994 to another, unconnected, group which later included several members of the team from the previous temporary station.

Sovereign Radio (later 107.5 Sovereign FM) began broadcasting in 1997 from studios at St Mary's Walk in Hailsham.

The station was later acquired by The Local Radio Company in 2000 and for a year, was once again managed by co-founder of the original (1992) RSL station Mark Briggs, who also managed neighbouring sister stations Arrow FM in Hastings and Neptune Radio (now KMFM in Dover and Folkestone).

Media Sound Holdings acquired the station from The Local Radio Company in June 2009 along with Hastings-based Arrow FM, with both stations were operating at a loss. The group already owned Splash FM and Bright FM which were acquired in April 2008.

In November 2010, Ofcom approved Media Sound Holdings's application to share all programmes across their four stations Arrow FM, Bright FM, Sovereign FM and Splash FM, given that the stations "already share all programming outside of breakfast, so these changes will not substantially alter the character of the service."

On 11 April 2016, Sovereign FM changed its name to More Radio.

== Programming ==
All programming on the station is produced from Total Sense Media's Worthing studios and shared with More Radio Eastbourne, More Radio Mid-Sussex and More Radio Worthing with opt-outs for local news and advertising.

Local news airs every hour from 6am to 6pm on weekdays and from 8am to 12pm on Saturdays with headlines on the half hour during weekday breakfast and drivetime shows. National news bulletins from Sky News Radio are carried hourly at all other times.
