= Win 107.2 =

Coordinates: 51°3′40.90″N 1°19′7.60″W

Win FM
England
- Broadcast area: Winchester and central Hampshire
- Frequency: 107.2 MHz FM

Programming
- Format: Adult Contemporary

Ownership
- Owner: TLRC, Radio Investments, Tindle Radio

History
- First air date: 3 October 1999

Links
- Website: winfm.co.uk (closed)

Win FM, the on-air name of Winchester Independent Radio, was an Independent Local Radio station for Winchester, in Hampshire, England, and surrounding areas. After two one-month trial broadcasts in 1996 and 1997 it won a permanent licence and began to broadcast on 3 October 1999. It closed on 2 October 2007.

The trial broadcasts were made from temporary studios in Winchester High Street. The permanent station broadcast from studios on the top floor of the Brooks Shopping Centre, Winchester.

The station played pop music from the 1960s onwards, and covered local news and events in central Hampshire, with news bulletins generally on the hour through weekday daytimes and weekend mornings. There were also 15-minute local news programmes Winchester Today on weekday lunchtimes and Winchester Tonight on weekday evenings.

Win FM did many outside broadcasts from around the area, including presenting live at the switch-on of the Winchester Christmas lights, and the Winchester Round Table fireworks display.

Presenters included Simon Norton, Andy Martindale, Phil Stocks, Ken Rayner, Brian Matthews, Tim Butcher, David Woollatt, Phil Marriott, Dina Burgess, Nick David, Steve Ridout, Jo Jones, Matt Aldous, Ben Shoveller, Dave Moses and James Morgan.

The station was originally owned by The Local Radio Company and Jacob & Johnson, then owners of the Hampshire Chronicle newspaper. Jacob & Johnson sold their share at the same time as they sold the Hampshire Chronicle. Ownership later passed to Radio Investments Inc, and then to a later company using the old name The Local Radio Company. It was bought by Tindle Radio in October 2006. Tindle closed the station in October 2007, replacing it with Dream 107.2.

The 107.2 frequency has subsequently been used by: Dream 107.2 (2007–8), Radio Hampshire (2008–9), Play Radio (2009–10), The Breeze (2010-20), Hits Radio South Coast (2020-22) and Easy Radio South Coast (2022-).
