= Nation 80s =

Nation 80s may refer to either of the following radio services, operated by Nation Broadcasting:

- Swansea Bay Radio, a local FM and DAB station for Swansea, which broadcast as Nation 80s between 2012 and 2013
- Nation 80s, a digital station launched in 2020, part of a suite of digital-first services operated online and in several areas over DAB+
