= South Coast Radio =

England
- Broadcast area: Sussex and Hampshire, England
- Frequencies: 945, 1170, 1323 and 1557 Khz

Programming
- Format: Easy listening

Ownership
- Owner: Southern Radio

History
- First air date: 24 September 1991

South Coast Radio was an Independent Local Radio station which broadcast on Medium Wave on the South Coast of England between 1991 and 1998.

== History ==
With a music policy described as "Nice & Easy", it was the sister station to Southern Sound and Ocean Sound, later "Southern FM" and "Ocean FM" and both now "Heart". The station transmitters were at Marchwood near Southampton (1557 kHz), Farlington Marshes near Portsmouth (1170 kHz), Portslade near Brighton (1323 kHz) and, latterly, Bexhill (945 kHz). The station's studios were originally alongside those of Ocean and Power FM in Segensworth, Hampshire but latterly moved to the Southern FM building in Portslade near Brighton.

By 1994 the Southern Radio Group had been bought out by Capital Radio plc. When Capital Radio took over the organisation they added an extra transmitter to the service at Bexhill, for Eastbourne and East Sussex, on 945 kHz. The test transmissions consisted of days of the sounds of seagulls.

South Coast Radio continued for several years but was eventually abandoned in 1998 in favour of a relay of the Capital Gold oldies station from studios in London, although around three hours of local opt-outs per day were retained for Hampshire and Sussex.
