= Mark Collins =

Mark Collins may refer to:

- Mark Collins (American football) (born 1964), American football player
- Mark Collins (musician) (born 1965), English musician
- Mark Collins (Broadcaster) (born 1961), Radio Presenter
- Mark Collins (Gaelic footballer) (born 1990), Irish Gaelic footballer
- N. Mark Collins (born 1952), British director of the Commonwealth Foundation
- Marco Collins (Mark William Collins, born 1965), American radio personality

== See also ==
- Marcus Collins (disambiguation)
