= Nino Firetto =

British broadcaster

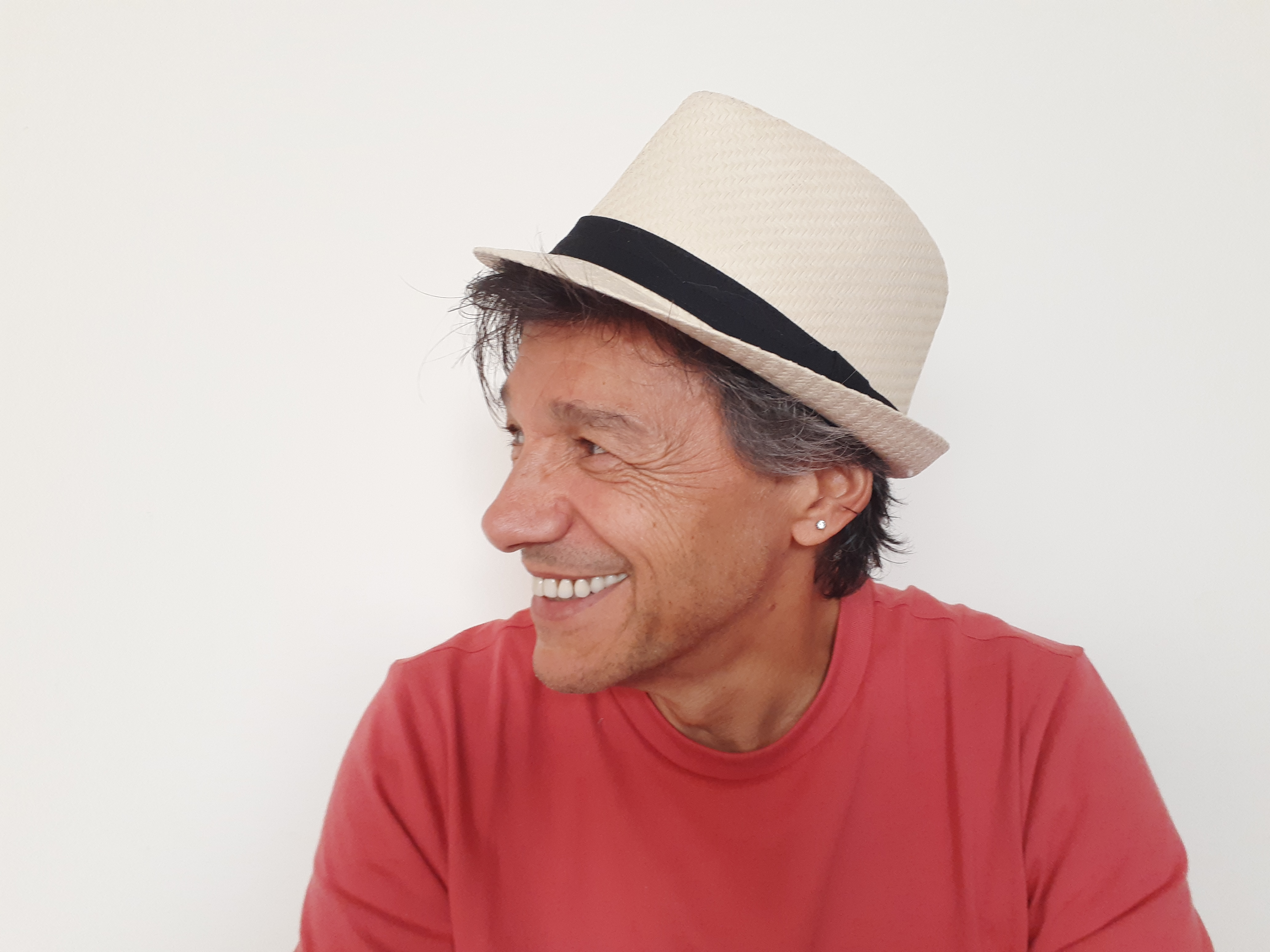
- Born: Anthony Edward Paolo Firetto; 30 June 1957 (age 69); Cheshunt, Hertfordshire, England
- Occupations: radio presenter, television presenter, actor, columnist
- Years active: 1976–present
- Spouse: Anastasia
- Website: www.ninofiretto.com

Anthony Edward Paolo Firetto (born 30 June 1957) is a British radio presenter, TV host and actor, currently based in San Francisco, United States.

== Biography ==
Firetto became known as a DJ in the 1970s, then as a television personality in the 1980s. His career began in the nightclubs of Bristol when he was 15, introducing chart acts to the Bristol music scene, before becoming a finalist in the 208 Radio Luxembourg "Celebrity DJ" competition. Firetto won a 30-minute guest slot on the radio station. His broadcasting career started when he filled in at Radio 210 in Reading and Radio Victory in Portsmouth. He was then signed to the English version of Radio Luxembourg, before being chosen by Dave Cash, the program director of the new independent radio service for Bristol, Radio West, to launch the service and host the breakfast show.

After six weeks presenting the breakfast show, he moved to the weekends to present a Sony award–nominated children's show called Nino's Gang, which urged young listeners to sign up as free members to a musical gang. In September 1984, Firetto began presenting the weekday evening Music Magazine.

After two years with Radio West, Firetto left in 1984 to pursue a career in television, firstly on the Children's ITV flagship magazine program Splash!. He also hosted the music strand on the Saturday morning children's show Get Fresh. In 1987, Firetto was voted the Children's ITV Personality of the Year. He also became a presenter on pan-European music channel Music Box. He went on to present the British version of the dating game show Love me, love me not produced by TVS for ITV; later, he presented a modern version of the seminal ITV quiz show Mr. and Mrs. Other credits include hosting a weekly American football show for ITV called The American Match, showbiz correspondent for LNN's London Tonight, and hosting the Malibu World Dance Championship strand on ITV's Summertime Special. Firetto became a regular guest on panel shows such as Give Us a Clue, Whose Baby?, and What's My Line; but he retained his contact with radio, presenting breakfast on Galaxy 101 and on a national satellite service called "Night Tracks".

In 2000, Firetto became the morning host on Kestrel FM in Basingstoke. Then, in February 2001, he moved to present the weekday drive program for Wave 105, the English regional station for the south coast. He remained there until June 2003.

In July 2004, he moved to the US to work as weekend afternoon host and swing presenter for Adult Top 40 music station KLLC Alice 97.3 in San Francisco.

Returning to the UK, Nino Firetto launched Nino Firetto Casting and presented the daily morning show on Radio Exe in Devon.

Following an ongoing joke between Firetto and the editor of the Express & Echo newspaper in Exeter, Firetto donned Speedo-style swimwear for his radio show to raise money for the charity Dream-A-Way.

In November 2021 Nino is host of the midday show on Saturday at Radio Exe in Exeter, Devon. Nino also hosts shows on his internet radio station Memory Lane UK Radio.
