= 1986 in Wales =

- Centuries: 18th; 19th; 20th; 21st
- Decades: 1960s; 1970s; 1980s; 1990s; 2000s
- See also: List of years in Wales; Timeline of Welsh history 1986 in The United Kingdom England Scotland Elsewhere

This article is about the particular significance of the year 1986 to Wales and its people.

== Incumbents ==
- Secretary of State for Wales – Nicholas Edwards
- Archbishop of Wales – Derrick Childs, Bishop of Monmouth (retired)
- Archdruid of the National Eisteddfod of Wales – Elerydd

== Events ==
- 21 April – Elizabeth II is presented with a kilo of Welsh gold from Gwynfynydd Gold Mine for her 60th birthday, in the knowledge that supplies are becoming scarce.
- May – Cardiff City and Swansea City are both relegated to the Football League Fourth Division in England. Swansea, who were in the First Division between 1981 and 1983, recently came close to going out of existence due to huge debts.
- 30 June – Mardy Colliery, the last pit in the Rhondda, is closed, but underground links to Tower Colliery in the Cynon Valley enable the coal cut there to be raised at Tower.
- September – The Wales National Ice Rink opens in Cardiff.
- November – Castles and Town Walls of King Edward in Gwynedd (Beaumaris, Caernarfon, Conwy and Harlech Castles and Caernarfon and Conwy town walls, designated collectively) become the first Welsh sites designated as UNESCO World Heritage Sites, in the first tranche of U.K. designations.
- December – Bersham Colliery, the last deep mine in the Denbighshire Coalfield, is closed.
- date unknown – A planning application is turned down at Llanrhaeadr, Clwyd, on the grounds that it would be detrimental to the Welsh language. It is the first time such a decision has ever been made.

== Arts and literature ==
- Alternative rock band Manic Street Preachers formed at Oakdale Comprehensive School.
- Ballet Cymru formed as Cwmni Ballet Gwent, a touring classical ballet company based in Newport.
- The first Welsh Proms are held at St David's Hall, Cardiff.
- The Old Devils, Kingsley Amis's novel set in Wales, wins the Booker Prize.
- Publisher Honno is established in Aberystwyth to publish writing by the women of Wales.

=== Awards ===
- National Eisteddfod of Wales (held in Fishguard)
- National Eisteddfod of Wales: Chair – Gwynn ap Gwilym, "Y Cwmwl"
- National Eisteddfod of Wales: Crown – T James Jones, "Llwch"
- National Eisteddfod of Wales: Prose Medal – Ray Evans
- Gwobr Goffa Daniel Owen – Robat Gruffudd, Llosgi

=== New books ===
==== English language ====
- Duncan Bush – Salt
- Mary Jones – Resistance
- Jenny Nimmo – The Snow Spider
- Christopher Norris – Contest of Faculties
- Oliver Reynolds – Skevington's Daughter
- Alun Richards – Days of Absence
- R. S. Thomas – Experimenting with an Amen
- Gwyn Alf Williams – When Was Wales?
- Raymond Williams – Loyalties

==== Welsh language ====
- J. Eirian Davies – Cerddi
- Bobi Jones – Hunllef Arthur
- Dic Jones – Sgubo'r Storws
- Rhiannon Davies Jones – Dyddiadur Mary Gwyn
- Elyn L. Jones – Cyfrinach Hannah
- Angharad Tomos – Yma o Hyd

=== Music ===
==== Classical ====
- Arwel Hughes – Gloria Patri
- Daniel Jones – Cello Concerto
- Colin Ross – Prelude for Piano

==== Albums ====
- Y Cyrff – Dan y Cownter
- Bonnie Tyler – Secrets Dreams And Forbidden Fire (album)
- Chichester Psalms, featuring Aled Jones

== Film ==
=== Welsh-language films ===
- Ibiza, Ibiza
- Milwr Bychan
- Rhosyn a Rhith (English: Coming Up Roses)

== Broadcasting ==
=== Welsh-language television ===
- Sam Tân (Fireman Sam)

=== English-language television ===
- A Child's Christmas in Wales (adaptation of a short story by Dylan Thomas)
- BBC Wales wins awards for Penyberth and Ms Rhymney Valley 1985 (documentary) at the Celtic Film and Television Festival.
- Chris Stuart – Cha Cha Chat Show

== Sports ==
- Athletics: Kirsty Wade becomes the first Welsh woman to win the gold medal in the 800m and 1500m at the Commonwealth Games.
- BBC Wales Sports Personality of the Year – Kirsty Wade
- Boxing:
  - 9 April – Robert Dickie wins the British featherweight title.
- Cricket: Greg Thomas is capped for England. Matthew Maynard becomes the youngest player ever to score 1000 runs for Glamorgan CCC.
- Gymnastics: Andrew Morris becomes British men's champion for the third time.

== Births ==
- 9 January – Craig Davies, footballer
- 20 January – Hannah Daniel, actress
- 3 February – David Edwards, footballer
- 11 February – Robin Hawkins, singer and bass player
- 21 February – Charlotte Church, singer
- 21 March – Samantha Bowen, Paralympic sitting volleyball player
- 28 March – Jay Curtis, broadcaster and actor
- 31 March – Matthew Collins, footballer
- 11 April – Dai Greene, athlete
- 25 May – Geraint Thomas, cyclist
- 17 November – Joe Jacobson, footballer

== Deaths ==
- 8 January – Mansel Thomas, conductor and composer, 76
- 9 January – Wilson Jones, footballer, 71
- 15 January – Alfred Bestall, illustrator, 93
- 16 February – John Tripp, poet, 58
- 28 February – Sir Thomas Williams, lawyer and politician, 70
- 1 March – Tommy Farr, boxer, 72
- 5 March – Lewis Valentine, political activist, 92
- 10 March
  - E. Gwyndaf Evans, poet and archdruid, 73
  - Ray Milland, actor, 79
- 14 March – Sir Huw Wheldon, television producer and presenter, 69
- 30 April – George Whitcombe, footballer, 84
- 5 June – John Bevan, Wales rugby union coach, 38
- 29 July – Gordon Mills, music industry manager, 51
- 29 August – Annie Powell, politician and Wales's first Communist mayor, 79
- 18 September – Elwyn Davies, university and cultural administrator, 77
- 1 November – Tom Arthur, Wales national rugby player, 80
- 6 November (at Henley-on-Thames) – Howard Thomas, radio producer, 77
- November/December – Ivor Davies, Liberal politician, journalist and administrator, 71
- 13 December – Glyn Daniel, archaeologist, 72
- date unknown
  - Geoffrey D. Lloyd, journalist
  - Fred Warren, footballer, 78

== See also ==
- 1986 in Northern Ireland
