= Marcus Collins (disambiguation) =

Marcus Collins (born 1988) is an English singer and finalist on The X Factor in 2011.

Marcus Collins may also refer to:

- Marcus Collins (album), the singer's self-titled debut album
- Marcus Evelyn Collins (1861–1944), British architect
- Marcus Collins (historian), British modern historian
- Marcus Collins, American actor and singer with country trio The Texas Tenors

== See also ==
- Mark Collins (disambiguation)
