= Total Sense Media =

British radio company

Total Sense Media (formerly Media Sound Holdings) is a company which was incorporated in 2005 and is based in Burgess Hill, East Sussex in the United Kingdom. As of 2015 it operates five radio stations in the South of England, and publishes two magazines.

In April 2008, Bright FM in Burgess Hill and 107.7 Splash FM in Worthing merged. The company later purchased Arrow FM and Sovereign FM from TLRC in June 2009.

In October 2012, it was announced that the company would merge with Isle of Wight Radio, alongside its Beacon magazine, reuniting Arrow FM and Sovereign FM with their former sister station under TLRC. The merger involved the Isle of Wight Radio's shareholders taking shares in Media Sound Holdings, with Claire Willis and Hedley Finn joining the board. It was confirmed that staffing would not be impacted at the station with continued broadcast from the Isle of Wight and no plans for content sharing amongst the stations, though it was stated this may be considered in future for off peak hours.

It was announced in December 2015 that the periodical publication Sussex Living, a glossy lifestyle and local news magazine, had been bought by Media Sound Holdings.

In April 2016, the group announced it was re-branding its four Sussex radio stations, Arrow FM, Bright FM, Sovereign FM and Splash FM to More Radio.

On 1st September 2026, More Radio and Isle of Wight Radio were sold to Nation Broadcasting.

== Radio stations ==
- More Radio Hastings, formerly Arrow FM, which serves Hastings, Bexhill and Battle
- More Radio Mid-Sussex, formerly Bright FM, which serves Burgess Hill, Haywards Heath and Lewes
- More Radio Eastbourne, formerly Sovereign FM, which serves Eastbourne and Hailsham
- More Radio Worthing, formerly Splash FM, which serves Worthing, Littlehampton and Shoreham by Sea
- Isle of Wight Radio, which serves the Isle of Wight

=== Defunct stations ===
- More Radio Retro – digital-only oldies station broadcast across Sussex on DAB from June 2021 to September 2026
- Isle of Wight Radio Retro, via digital radio on the Isle of Wight from April to September 2026

More Radio Retro and Isle of Wight Radio Retro ceased broadcasting at midnight on 30 September (into 1 October) 2026 following the acquisition of TSM's stations by Nation Broadcasting.
