= Southern Radio Group =

The Southern Radio Group was a company which owned and operated radio stations on the south coast of England.

== History ==
Southern Radio Group was formed when Ocean Sound merged with Southern FM. Later, in 1992, Invicta FM and its AM services Invicta SuperGold in Kent, and Mellow 1557 in Essex joined the group as a result of a reverse takeover by the Invicta Radio Group.

In 1994, Capital Radio purchased Southern Radio plc, which included Ocean Sound. This led to the station being a more music-led station, playing heavy rotation soft adult contemporary hits, with its news and information sequences reduced in length and finishing with the sentence "And that's the way it is at <time check>" like Capital FM. Whilst Power FM took on Capital FM's long-established, successful and highly polished sound.

In 1997 the Capital Radio Group sought Radio Authority approval to reduce the amount of local programming on its AM stations, this would mean South Coast Radio opting-out of a main service based in London. There Capital Gold was launched in place of South Coast Radio, with four hours programming locally produced, usually either at breakfast or drivetime.
