= Dream 107.2 =

Radio station in Winchester, England

England
- Broadcast area: Winchester
- Frequency: 107.2 MHz FM

Programming
- Format: Adult Contemporary

Ownership
- Owner: Tindle Radio

History
- First air date: 5 October 2007

Links
- Website: www.dream1072.com

Dream 107.2 was an Independent Local Radio station, primarily serving Winchester, Eastleigh and their conurbations, owned by the Tindle Radio Group.

== History ==
Win 107.2 launched in 1999 financed by Radio Investments Ltd, from studios in The Brooks Shopping Centre in Winchester town centre, and marketed with the slogan "best music, breaking news". A buyout of Radio Investments saw the station rebrand to 107.2 Win FM in 2004 under the ownership of The Local Radio Company.

Win FM was sold to the Tindle Radio by The Local Radio Company in September 2006, and in an effort to distinguish the station from its more successful rivals in its transmission area, was rebranded as Dream 107.2 in October 2007, adopting a soft adult contemporary music policy in early 2008 akin to that of London-based Magic 105.4 and latter-day competitor The Coast 106, which launched in October 2008.

In November 2008 Dream 107.2 became a relay for Radio Hampshire, simulcasting all output except for "four hours a day of bespoke programming".

The first song to be played on Dream 107.2 was Candi Staton's "Young Hearts Run Free" during Breakfast with Andy Green and the last was The Moody Blues' "Go Now" which was played during Pippa Head's Mid-Morning Show.

== Performance ==
Faced with competition from several regional rivals, Dream struggled to deliver large numbers of listeners, and withdrew from RAJAR audience measurement surveys a year before its closure. In its final survey (in the final quarter of 2007), Dream had 9,000 weekly listeners, with a market share of 1.4%.
