= More Radio Worthing =

- Worthing; England
- Broadcast area: West Sussex
- Frequency: 107.7 FM

Programming
- Format: Adult Contemporary

Ownership
- Owner: Nation Broadcasting
- Sister stations: More Radio Hastings; More Radio Mid-Sussex; More Radio Eastbourne; Nation Radio South

History
- First air date: 5 May 2003
- Former names: Splash FM

Links
- Webcast: Listen Live
- Website: More Radio

More Radio Worthing (known as Splash FM from 2003 to 2016), is an Independent Local Radio station serving Worthing, Shoreham, Littlehampton and surrounding areas. It is owned and operated by Nation Broadcasting and broadcasts from Total Sense Media Centre in Burgess Hill, as part of a network of stations across Sussex.

== History ==
In April 2008, the station became part of Total Sense Media, after merging with neighbouring radio station Mid Sussex-based Bright FM. In June 2009, the group added Arrow FM in Hastings and Sovereign FM in Eastbourne to their portfolio from TLRC.

In November 2010, Ofcom approved a request to share programming across all four stations, stating the changes would not substantially alter the character of the service.

== Programming ==
All programming on the station is produced locally from More Radio's Burgess Hill studios and shared with More Radio Hastings (formerly Arrow FM), More Radio Mid-Sussex (Bright FM) and More Radio Eastbourne (Sovereign FM).

Local news airs every hour from 6am to 6pm on weekdays and from 8am to 12pm on Saturdays with headlines on the half-hour during weekday breakfast and drivetime shows. National news bulletins from Sky News Radio are carried hourly at all other times.
