= More Radio Mid-Sussex =

Coordinates: 50.955036°N 0.131116°W

- England
- Broadcast area: Mid Sussex; West Sussex; East Sussex
- Frequencies: 106.4 MHz, 106.8 MHz

Programming
- Format: Contemporary

Ownership
- Owner: Nation Broadcasting
- Sister stations: More Radio Hastings; More Radio Eastbourne; More Radio Worthing; Nation Radio South

History
- First air date: 31 March 2001
- Former names: Bright 106.4; Bright FM

Links
- Webcast: Listen Live
- Website: More Radio

More Radio Mid-Sussex, formerly Bright FM, is an Independent Local Radio station serving Mid Sussex, West Sussex and East Sussex and surrounding areas, on FM and DAB. It broadcasts from studios in Hickstead, as part of a network of stations across Sussex.

It was owned and operated by Total Sense Media until its sale to Nation Broadcasting was announced on 1st September 2026.

== Recent history ==
In 2005, Bright FM launched a second transmitter on 106.8 FM, extending its service to Lewes.

In April 2008, the station became part of Media Sound Holdings, following a merger with neighbouring radio station Worthing-based Splash FM. In June 2009, Media Sound Holdings added Arrow FM in Hastings and Sovereign FM in Eastbourne to their group from TLRC.

In November 2010, Ofcom approved a request to share programming across all four stations, stating the changes would not substantially alter the character of the service.

== Programming ==
All programming on the station is produced from Total Sense Media studios in Hickstead and shared with More Radio Hastings, More Radio Eastbourne, More Radio Mid-Sussex and More Radio Worthing with opt-outs for local news and advertising.

Local news airs every hour from 6am to 6pm on weekdays and from 8am to 12pm on Saturdays with headlines on the half-hour during weekday breakfast and drivetime shows. National news bulletins from Sky News Radio are carried hourly at all other times.
