= Co-op Radio =

Co-op Radio is the short name of some radio stations operated by cooperatives:

- Imagesound's in-store audio for stores in the British Co-op grocery store chain
- Kootenay Co-op Radio CJLY-FM in Nelson, British Columbia, Canada
- UNW Co-op Radio in Keston, Kent, United Kingdom
- Vancouver Co-operative Radio CFRO-FM in Vancouver, British Columbia, Canada
