= Radio Victory =

- England
- Broadcast area: Portsmouth & Isle of Wight
- Frequencies: 95.0 MHz VHF & 1169/1170 kHz MW (Original), DAB+ on Band III Block 8B, with a center frequency of 197.648 MHz (Relaunched)

Programming
- Format: Contemporary

Ownership
- Owner: Various, Relaunched owned by Radio Victory Limited.

History
- First air date: 14 October 1975
- Last air date: 28 June 1986 (original) - Now Relaunched

Radio Victory is the Independent Local Radio (ILR) station for Portsmouth in southern England. It was launched on 14 October 1975 and served south Hampshire, West Sussex and the Isle of Wight initially until 1986, with various later reincarnations. It took its name from the famous historic ship HMS Victory which is preserved at Portsmouth.

Radio Victory relaunched, and as of 17 October 2025, honours the original incarnation of the radio station by using much of the original branding, programmes, and presenters.

== History ==
=== IBA franchise 1975-1986 ===
Victory was one of the first 19 independent stations in the UK, all of which started broadcasting between 1973 and 1976. Its studios were based in Fratton, Portsmouth. Its FM transmitter, on 95.0 MHz, was at Fort Widley. Despite a power of only 0.2 kW, the signal reached Southampton and across the Isle of Wight quite well. The station also broadcast on Medium Wave 257m (1169 kHz, later moving to 1170 kHz) from Farlington Marshes with a power of 0.2 kW.

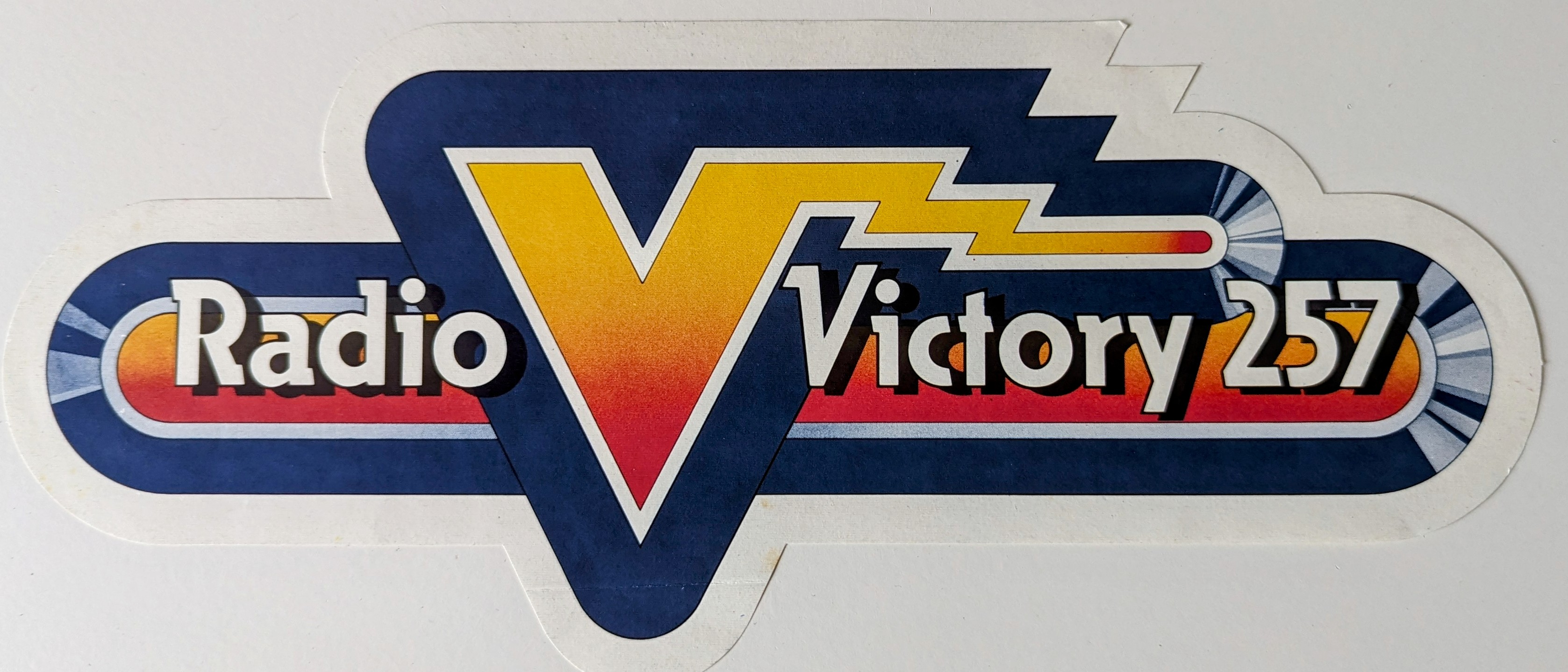
The official Radio Victory logo (1975)

Victory had three managing directors throughout its life – Guy Paine, John Russell, and finally Bruce Jenkins. Housed in St Mary's Institute in Portsmouth's Fratton Road, its address was PO Box 257, Portsmouth PO1 5RT.

Radio Victory's first Programme Controller was David Symonds (former BBC) with the on-air line-up of presenters including Dave Christian (former Radio Luxembourg), Eugene Fraser, Jack McLaughlin, Matt Hopper, Sarah Ward, Chrissy Pollard, Anton Darby, John Terrett and Andy Ferris, plus local presenters Glenn Richards, Nicky Jackson, Graham Starr and Howard Pearce.

The initial News team was led by Paul and Trisha Ingrams and included Keith Butler, George East and Chris Rider. Kenny Everett, Roger Scott, Tommy Vance and Don Moss also did a series of programmes for the station in its early years.

Later daytime presenters for the station included Chris Carnegy, Bill Padley, Kevin Huffer, Roger Kennedy, Nino Firetto, Gary Champion and Neil Crespin.

For most of its life, Victory transmitted from 6 am to 1 am Mondays–Fridays, 6 am to 2 am Saturdays and 7 am to midnight on Sundays. This increased to 24-hour broadcasting from the start of the Falklands Conflict. Newsreader Penny Guy broadcast news of the first UK warship casualty—the sinking of HMS Sheffield. Listeners were unaware her fiancé Derek was aboard the vessel and she had no idea if he was alive or dead. (He survived and they wed shortly afterwards.)

In 1985, the Independent Broadcasting Authority failed to renew the station's licence and it ceased broadcasting on 28 June 1986 at 12 midday, after 10 years and around 257 days on air, despite a local campaign to save it. Fratton Road in Portsmouth was jammed solid with traffic, drivers blaring their horns in tribute as the airwaves fell silent for the last time. Victory was the first ILR station to lose its franchise (although two others, Centre Radio and Gwent Broadcasting, went off air after going bankrupt).

The station was replaced by Ocean Sound which was given a licence for a larger coverage area including Southampton.

=== Victory FM and Radio Victory 1994-1999 ===
The name Victory, as a radio station for the Portsmouth area, was re-invented in 1994 to mark the city's 800th birthday and the 50th anniversary of D-Day (the city was the world's focus for this, hosting many events, including a dinner for world leaders in the Guildhall). Victory FM was set up by Mark Samways with the help of Kevin Huffer. Alex Bentley, the city's Lord Mayor during the set-up period, was most encouraging and helped by arranging for the council to provide space for the studios in the civic offices for a peppercorn rent. This first outing for the new service acquired a 28-day Restricted Service Licence from the Radio Authority.

It returned to the air twice more as Victory FM – over the Christmas period of 1994 and again in 1995 to mark VE Day's 50th anniversary. The studios for this period were located in Anchor House, North End and were loaned by the owners Bradford and Bingley Building Society. The building had been empty since the Hampshire Building Society closed for business.

The name was kept alive predominantly by the same team, broadcasting from a studio in Twyford Avenue, Stamshaw, this time broadcasting as Radio Victory on cable TV and with occasional temporary FM licences for special occasions, such as their own launch on cable at Christmas 1995 and to cover the Special Olympics. A total of six 28-day RSL FM broadcasts were made from 1994 to 1998.

=== Victory FM, Victory 107.4 and 107.4 The Quay 1999 - 2010 ===
When Greater Portsmouth was re-issued with its own commercial radio licence, Radio Victory won the bid, returning to the airwaves on 19 September 1999 as Victory FM on 107.4 FM. The station was acquired by TLRC at the end of 1999, and 2000 saw a massive change of personnel. It would seem that, without the key members who took the station from 28-day RSL to full-time FM licence, it was unable to compete in the RAJAR ratings against now established local rivals like Ocean FM and Wave 105. The station later relaunched as Victory 107.4 and 107.4 The Quay, allying itself closely to Portsmouth Football Club who, from Autumn of 2009, became the sole owners. In 2010 the station was sold to Celador's radio arm and the frequency became part of a regional station called The Breeze on 4 July 2010. The local studio in Twyford Avenue used since 1999 was closed.

=== Registration of trade mark 2014 ===
In November 2014 Independent Local Radio Limited, a company with no previous connection to the name, registered a new figurative trademark for Radio Victory along with several figurative trademarks for other former UK local radio stations.

In early 2015 Independent Local Radio Limited launched a crowdfunding bid "to raise £25,000 to cover the cost of licences" to launch Radio Victory again; this campaign closed having only raised £571.

This trademark was not renewed in November 2024.

=== Victory Online 2021 ===
A number of former Radio Victory presenters from the 3 eras of the station launched Victory Online at 13:00 on 18 February 2021, the opening programme was hosted by Neil Crespin. The radio station is currently transmitting on the Portsmouth DAB Multiplex.

=== Radio Victory - We're back loud and proud! ===
On the 50th Anniversary of the original Radio Victory's first broadcast, Victory Online hosted a 50th Anniversary celebration at The Gaiety Southsea, South Parade Pier, and announced it had acquired the trademark name Radio Victory Victory Online would be rebranding, as it had originally intended, to honour the heritage of the original Radio Victory, which broadcast from the St. Mary's Institute on Fratton Road, less than 5 miles from the current Cosham location, cementing its commitment to continuing the legacy of Radio Victory. Radio Victory broadcasts on DAB+ via the Portsmouth Multiplex and its also streaming online via its own website and most online radio service providers.

== On Air ==
One of Victory's longest running shows was the Victory Roll, its own top-40 chart show aired on Saturday evenings until all ILR stations started simulcasting the Network Chart from Capital Radio. The Victory Roll (presented by Tony Power) was initially based on the station's playlist but later was compiled from record sales at the Co-op record department in Fratton Road. The stations's first catchphrase was "everything that touches you". Presenters included Nino Firetto. The initial Victory FM catchphrases were "enjoy the moment", "from the heart of the city", and sometimes "to greater Portsmouth." Broadcasters on the relaunched Radio Victory 107.4 in 1999 included Boy George, who also presented on the cable service. Many of these original shows are back on air under the new relaunched Radio Victory DAB+ and online station.

== See also ==
- 107.4 The Quay
- Ocean FM
- BBC Radio Solent
