= Mynydd Pencarreg transmitting station =

Transmitter in Carmarthenshire, Wales

Mynydd Pencarreg
- Location within Carmarthenshire
- Mast height: 99 metres (325 ft)
- Coordinates: 52.067501°N 4.076674°W
- Grid reference: SN577430
- Built: 1956
- Relay of: Carmel
- BBC region: BBC Wales
- ITV region: ITV Cymru Wales

The Mynydd Pencarreg transmitting station is a broadcasting and telecommunications facility located on high ground about 10 kilometres (6.2 miles) south of Lampeter, in Ceredigion, Wales. The site has a guyed 99 m (325 ft) lattice mast erected on land that is itself about 410 m (1,345 ft) above sea level. It was originally built by the GPO as a telecommunications relay, and (amongst other things) was responsible for handling the microwave feed carrying the now-defunct 405-line VHF BBC television service to the television transmitter at Blaenplwyf about 35 kilometres (22 miles) to the northwest near Aberystwyth. Despite this, Mynydd Pencarreg was never a 405-line TV broadcast site.

Broadcast UHF television was added to the site in early 1981, launching with just the three programme services that were active at the time. S4C was added in 1982 when it launched.

Currently, the transmitter provides DVB-T digital television to the Lampeter area, along with FM radio.

== Services listed by frequency ==
=== Analogue television ===
==== February 1981 - 1 November 1982 ====
When 625-line colour television came to the area, the site became a relay of Preseli about 50 kilometres (31 miles) to the southwest.

Frequency	UHF	kW	Service
767.25 MHz	58	0.12	BBC1 Wales
791.25 MHz	61	0.12	HTV Wales
815.25 MHz	64	0.12	BBC2 Wales

==== 1 November 1982 - 19 August 2009 ====
Channel 4 was added to the set transmitted from the site when it launched in November 1982. Being in Wales, Mynydd Pencarreg radiated the S4C variant.

Frequency	UHF	kW	Service
735.25 MHz	54	0.12	S4C
767.25 MHz	58	0.12	BBC1 Wales
791.25 MHz	61	0.12	ITV1 Wales (HTV Wales before 2002)
815.25 MHz	64	0.12	BBC2 Wales

=== Analogue and digital television ===
==== 19 August 2009 - 16 September 2009 ====
The UK's digital switchover commenced, mirroring the changes taking place at the parent transmitter at Preseli. Analogue BBC Two Wales closed on channel 64 and ITV1 Wales took over on that frequency for what would be its final 3 weeks of service, vacating channel 61 as it did so. The new digital BBC A multiplex started up at full power in 64-QAM mode on channel 61.

Frequency	UHF	kW	Service	System
735.25 MHz	54	0.12	S4C	PAL System I
767.25 MHz	58	0.12	BBC One Wales	PAL System I
794.000 MHz	61	0.024	BBC A	DVB-T
815.25 MHz	64	0.12	ITV1 Wales	PAL System I

=== Digital television ===
==== 16 September 2009 - 31 October 2012 ====
All the analogue television services closed and the new digital multiplexes took over their frequencies.

Frequency	UHF	kW	Operator
738.000 MHz	54	0.012	BBC B
770.000 MHz	58	0.012	Digital 3&4
794.000 MHz	61	0.012	BBC A

==== 31 October 2012 - present ====
OFCOM have announced that channel 61 is also to be cleared so as to make space for future 4G mobile phone services. At Mynydd Pencarreg, BBC A was moved from channel 61 to channel 49.

Frequency	UHF	kW	Operator
698.000 MHz	49	0.012	BBC A
738.000 MHz	54	0.012	BBC B
770.000 MHz	58	0.012	Digital 3&4

=== Analogue radio (FM VHF) ===
==== August 1981 - Late 1980s ====
FM radio from Mynydd Pencarreg launched in 1981, initially with just the three services that were typical of the time. For radio, the site was an off-air relay of Blaenplwyf.

Frequency	kW	Service
89.7 MHz	0.2	BBC Radio 2
91.9 MHz	0.2	BBC Radio 3
94.1 MHz	0.2	BBC Radio Cymru

==== Present ====
Frequency	kW	Service
89.7 MHz	0.2	BBC Radio 2
91.9 MHz	0.2	BBC Radio 3
94.1 MHz	0.2	BBC Radio Cymru
96.6 MHz	0.2	Nation Radio Wales
99.3 MHz	0.2	BBC Radio 1
103.7 MHz	0.2	BBC Radio 4

== See also ==
- List of masts
- List of radio stations in the United Kingdom
- List of tallest buildings and structures in Great Britain
