= Marcus Collins (historian) =

English historian

Marcus Collins (born 1971) is a historian of contemporary Britain. He was educated at the University of Cambridge, Harvard University and Columbia University and currently teaches at Loughborough University. He is the author of The Beatles and Sixties Britain (Cambridge University Press, 2020), Modern Love (Atlantic, 2003), co-author with Peter Stearns of Why Study History? (LPP, 2020) and editor of The Permissive Society and Its Enemies (Rivers Oram, 2007). He was appointed as the AHRC BBC 100 Fellow in 2022 to stage events commemorating the BBC's centenary. He served as co-convenor of History UK from 2014 to 2017 and as elected member of Council of the Royal Historical Society from 2017 to 2020.
