= Scarlet FM =

97.5 Scarlet FM
- Narberth, Pembrokeshire; United Kingdom
- Broadcast area: South Carmarthenshire
- Frequency: 97.5 MHz

Programming
- Format: Adult Contemporary

Ownership
- Owner: Town and Country Broadcasting

History
- First air date: 14 July 2002; 24 years ago

Technical information
- Transmitter coordinates: 51.7000°N 4.1573°W

Links
- Website: 97.5 Scarlet FM

Scarlet FM was an Independent Local Radio station, serving South Carmarthenshire, owned and operated by Town and Country Broadcasting (now Nation Broadcasting).

Originally broadcast as a separate station from the Foothold Centre in the Stebonheath area of Llanelli, the station later moved to studios in Narberth in neighbouring Pembrokeshire.

After a period of dual-branding, the Llanelli frequency now carries all programming and branding from Radio Carmarthenshire and the rest of the Nation Broadcasting network of local stations, including countywide news, travel and community information, alongside chart music from the 1980s to the present day.
