= More Radio Hastings =

- England
- Broadcast area: Hastings & Bexhill
- Frequency: 107.8 MHz

Programming
- Format: Adult Contemporary

Ownership
- Owner: Nation Broadcasting
- Sister stations: More Radio Mid-Sussex; More Radio Eastbourne; More Radio Worthing; Nation Radio South

History
- First air date: 11 April 1998
- Former names: Arrow FM

Technical information
- Class: omni polarisation
- ERP: 100w

Links
- Webcast: Listen Live
- Website: More Radio

More Radio Hastings, formerly Arrow FM, is an Independent Local Radio station serving Hastings, Bexhill, Battle and surrounding areas. It is owned and operated by Nation Broadcasting and broadcasts from studios in Worthing, as part of a network of stations across Sussex in South East England.

== History ==
Arrow FM logo used until 2016

Arrow FM was founded in 1992 by two local radio executives, Mark Briggs and Matthew Wheeler, who conducted a series of restricted service licence (RSL) pilot broadcasts in both Hastings and Eastbourne. Three of the transmissions took place in Hastings under the Arrow FM and Splash FM branding – the licence holder was local DJ Terry James and the station manager was Terry Kane.

The group disbanded a year before the Radio Authority advertised a licence for one or more services in East Sussex. The winning bid, Conqueror Broadcasting Ltd – a consortium of local investors and radio operators, led by businessman Bill Uttley Moore CBE, who created the Arrow FM brand – won the licence in 1997. Mark Briggs rejoined the station ahead of its full-time launch on Good Friday 10 April 1998.

By 2000, Arrow FM had been sold to Radio Investments Ltd, which also had interests in nearby stations. This group went on to become The Local Radio Company, which then sold Arrow FM along with sister station Sovereign FM to Media Sound Holdings in 2009. Bespoke local programming for the area was reduced to the weekday breakfast show, with all other output shared with sister stations Bright FM, Sovereign FM and Splash FM.

In November 2010, Ofcom approved a request to share programming across all four stations, stating the changes would not substantially alter the character of the service.

== Programming ==
All programming on the station is produced from Total Sense's Worthing studios and shared with More Radio Mid-Sussex, More Radio Eastbourne and More Radio Worthing with opt-outs for local news and advertising. Local news airs every hour from 6am to 6pm on weekdays and from 8am to 12pm on Saturdays with headlines on the half-hour during weekday breakfast and drivetime shows. National news bulletins from Sky News Radio are carried hourly at all other times.

== Notable past presenters ==
Arrow FM's presenters during its early years of broadcasting included Peter Quinn.
