= Nation Radio UK =

Nation Radio London
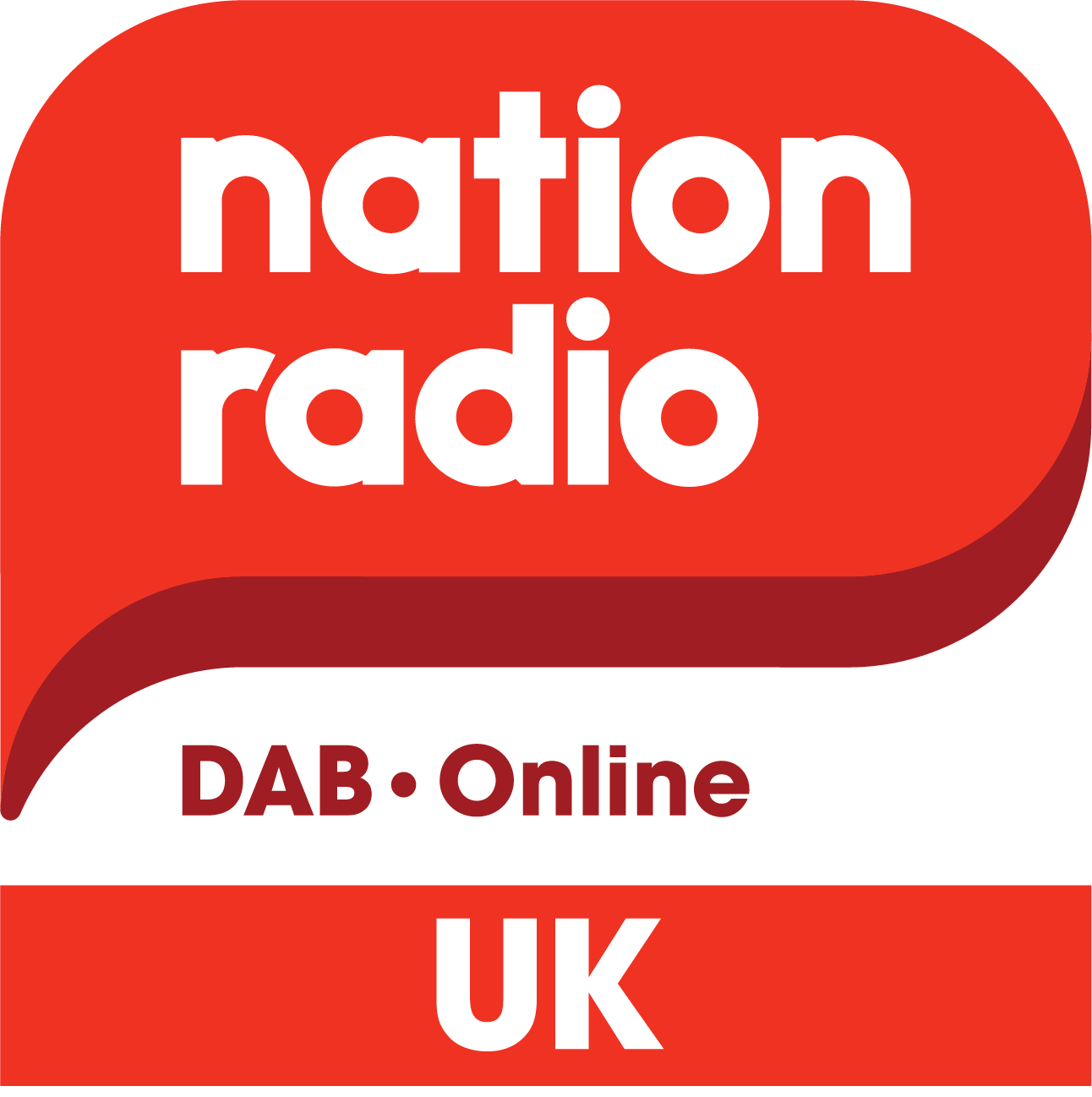
- United Kingdom
- Frequencies: FM: 107.5 MHz (East London and West Essex); DAB+: 8A (Santa Cruz De Tenerife); DAB+: 12A (London and the Home Counties and Channel Islands)

Programming
- Format: AC/oldies
- Network: Nation Radio

Ownership
- Owner: Nation Broadcasting

History
- First air date: 4 June 2018
- Former names: Thames Radio; Nation Radio UK

Links
- Website: Nation Radio UK

Nation Radio London is a quasi-national radio station in the UK, broadcasting online and on DAB. It is owned and operated by Nation Broadcasting.

The digital station was launched in June 2016 as Thames Radio with a line-up of former BBC and Capital presenters such as breakfast host Neil Fox, Dean Martin, Tony Blackburn, Alex Lester, Pat Sharp and Neil Francis, with all presenters broadcasting from 'virtual studios' (as Thames Radio had no physical studio premises of its own).

In June 2017, Thames Radio dropped all of its presenters and became a non-stop music station, until changing its name to Nation Radio London in June 2018. This was because the company behind Thames Radio had acquired a radio licence from Rock Radio Scotland (which was being unused) and wanted to launch a more 'national' service which would also include a station in Wales in time.

In 2021, the station became known as Nation Radio UK, with DJs including Russ Williams and Neil Francis, with Mike Read broadcasting The Heritage Chart every Sunday at 5pm.

In May 2022, broadcaster Greg Burns joined Nation Radio UK.

In April 2025, broadcaster Roberto joined the Nation network hosting breakfast on Nation 80s and weekday evenings on Nation Radio UK.

As of September 2024, the station broadcasts to a weekly audience of 171,000, according to RAJAR.

In June 2025, the station reverted to the name Nation Radio London and, on 1 August 2025, replaced Time 107.5.

== Presenters ==
=== Current presenters ===
- Tim Allen
- Gary Parker
- Tony and Emma at Breakfast
- Mark Collins
- Tony Shepherd
- Neil 'Roberto' Williams
- Greg Burns
- David Francis
- Neil Greenslade
- Neil Fox
- Steve Power
- Mark Franklin
- Dean Martin

=== Former presenters ===
- Dave Brown
- Russ Williams
- Paul Newman
- Mike Read
- Adam English
- Neil Francis

== List of stations ==
As of March 2026, the Nation Radio service broadcasts across 8 regional stations with a mix of networked and regional programming. Nation Radio syndicates programming to these stations outside of their regional shows. Nation Radio Westcountry takes the Nation Radio South weekday evening show.

Station	FM Broadcast Area	DAB Broadcast Area	Local opt-out hours
Nation Radio London	East London and west Essex	Greater London	Weekdays 0400-1300 & 1600-2000; Sun-Thu nights 2300-0200
Nation Radio Wales	Cardiff, Newport, Carmarthenshire, Pembrokeshire, Swansea	SE Wales (incl. Cardiff & Newport), North West Wales, Ceredigion, Mid & West Wales (incl. Carmarthenshire, Aberystwyth, Pembrokeshire, Swansea), NE Wales/W Cheshire	Weekdays 0600-1300 & 1600-2000
Nation Radio Scotland	Glasgow, Paisley, West Dumbartonshire, Helensburgh	Central Scotland, Ayrshire	Weekdays 0600-2000, Sat 0600-1800, Sun 0600-1600
Nation Radio South	South Hampshire, Dorset, Isle of Wight and West Sussex	South Hampshire, Berkshire/N. Hampshire, Dorset, Sussex, Salisbury	Weekdays 0600-1000, Mon-Th 1600-2300, Fri 1600-Sat 1000, Sat 2300-Sun 1000
Nation Radio Yorkshire	Kingston upon Hull, East Riding of Yorkshire, Humberside	North Yorkshire, Lincolnshire	Weekdays 0600-2000, Sat & Sun 1000-1400
Nation Radio Suffolk	Suffolk, North Essex	Suffolk	Weekdays 0600-1000 & 1600-2000
Nation Radio North East	Sunderland, Wearside, County Durham, Darlington	Newcastle-upon-Tyne, Gateshead, Tynemouth, South Shields, Northumberland, Redcar, County Durham	Weekdays 0600-1000 & 1600-2000, Sat & Sun 1000-1400
Nation Radio Westcountry		Somerset (from 9 March 2026); Devon, Cornwall (from 30 March 2026)	Weekdays 0600-1300 & 1600-2000; Sat 0600-1800; Sun 1000-1600

=== Spin-offs ===
Nation Radio broadcasts 11 spin-off stations, available on the Nation Player app and other online platforms, and in some areas across the UK on DAB.

Station	DAB Broadcast Area
Nation 60s	Salisbury, Wrexham, Plymouth (9C)
Nation 70s	Hull, London, Glasgow, Portsmouth, Suffolk, Wrexham, Plymouth (9C)
Nation 80s	London, South Hampshire, Oxfordshire, Kent, Cambridge, Peterborough, Herts/Beds/Bucks, Suffolk, Essex, Bristol, Bath/West Wilts, Swindon, Bournemouth, Cornwall, Devon, Wolverhampton, Coventry & Warks, Derbyshire, Nottinghamshire, Morecambe Bay, Newcastle/Gateshead, Tynemouth/South Shields, Darlington/Bishop Auckland, Alnwick/Morpeth, Ayrshire, Central Scotland, Ceredigion, Mid/West Wales, SE Wales, NE Wales/W Cheshire, NW Wales
Nation 90s	London, South Hampshire, Suffolk, Essex, Bristol, Bath/West Wilts, Swindon, Bournemouth, Cornwall, Devon, Wolverhampton, Coventry & Warks, Derbyshire, Nottinghamshire, Morecambe Bay, Hull, Tynemouth/South Shields, Darlington/Bishop Auckland, Glasgow, Ceredigion, Mid/West Wales, SE Wales, NE Wales/W Cheshire, NW Wales
Nation 00s	Salisbury
Nation Classic Hits	London
Nation Dance	Salisbury
Nation Hits	Tynemouth
Nation Love	Salisbury
Nation Rocks	Glasgow, Salisbury, Wrexham, Portsmouth
Nation Xmas	Tynemouth
