= Nation Easy Radio =

- Southampton; United Kingdom
- Broadcast area: South Hampshire
- Frequencies: FM: 107.2 MHz (Winchester); 107.4 MHz (Portsmouth); 107.8 MHz (Southampton)

Programming
- Format: MOR

Ownership
- Owner: Nation Broadcasting
- Operator: Nation Broadcasting
- Sister stations: Nation Radio South

History
- First air date: 1999 (as individual stations); 4 July 2010 (The Breeze); 31 August 2020 (Hits Radio); 19 September 2022 (Easy Radio)

Links
- Website: Nation Easy Radio

Nation Easy Radio is an Independent Local Radio station based in Southampton, England, owned and operated by Nation Broadcasting. It broadcasts to the South Coast of England. The station has been part of the Easy Radio network since September 2022 when the Hits Radio licensing name agreement ended.

As of September 2024, the station has a weekly audience of 38,000 listeners according to RAJAR.

== History ==
=== 107.8 FM in Southampton ===
The 107.8 FM service launched under the name SouthCity FM on 5 September 1999.

In 2004, the licence was acquired by Southampton Football Club, who renamed the station as The Saint, effectively making it an FM version of their existing club station of the same name (which was broadcasting on digital TV and online). The service was at this point based at studios within Southampton FC's ground, St Mary's Stadium.

On 26 July 2007, Southampton FC confirmed it had sold the station to South Wales-based radio group Town & Country Broadcasting – a firm headed by lifelong Southampton FC fan Jason Bryant (formerly of Talksport and Virgin Radio). The sale led to a rebranding of the station as 107.8 Radio Hampshire from 6 August 2007. As Radio Hampshire, the station combined adult contemporary music with information and breaking news from Southampton FC; match coverage also continued, and the station continued to be operated from the studio at St. Mary's.

Radio Hampshire joined Nation Radio, 102.1 Swansea Bay Radio, 102.5 Radio Pembrokeshire, 97.1 Radio Carmarthenshire, 97.5 Scarlet FM and 106.3 Bridge FM in the T&CB portfolio.

=== 107.2 FM in Winchester ===
In 1999, Win 107.2 (later 107.2 Win FM) was launched as a new local station serving the Winchester and Eastleigh area. Owned by Radio Investments Ltd, the station broadcast from a studio at the Brooks Shopping Centre in Winchester town centre. RIL was later bought by The Local Radio Company.

TLRC sold Win FM to the Tindle Radio Group in September 2006, and the new owner rebranded the station as Dream 107.2 in October 2007, adopting a soft adult contemporary music policy.

With extensive competition in the South Hampshire marketplace from numerous regional rivals – including Ocean (now Heart), Wave 105 and Original 106 (now 106 Sam FM) – Dream 107.2 struggled to build an audience, and Tindle Group subsequently decided the station was not viable as a business and should be sold off.

==== Franchise merger ====
In November 2008, Tindle Radio Group sold Dream 107.2 to Town & Country Broadcasting, who sought and received permission to largely absorb the Winchester service into their existing Radio Hampshire service at Southampton. The Winchester studios were closed and the 107.2 FM Winchester frequency switched to sharing content with Southampton's service 20 hours a day. A separate local daily breakfast programme for the Winchester licence area was maintained, though this was broadcast from the Southampton base.

=== 107.4 FM in Portsmouth ===
The local FM service for Portsmouth went on air on 19 September 1999 as a revived version of Radio Victory; this was acquired soon after launch by The Local Radio Company (TLRC) and later relaunched as 107.4 The Quay (also known as Quay Radio). The Quay broadcast from studios on Twyford Avenue in Portsmouth.

Portsmouth F.C. subsequently entered into a joint-venture with TLRC to run the station (along with Spirit FM in Chichester and Isle of Wight Radio), with the club taking full control of The Quay when the partnership was dissolved in August 2009 (TLRC retained Spirit FM) and renaming the station Quay Radio.

In the summer of 2010, Portsmouth F.C. went into administration; Quay Radio was shut down at noon on Friday 30 July 2010 as a result. The station was sold to Celador Radio Broadcasting, who announced that following their purchase of the frequency, 107.4 FM would broadcast as part of The Breeze 107 from the end of July 2010.

The broadcast rights to Portsmouth F.C.'s matches remained with the club, meaning that the club's matches would no longer be broadcast on 107.4 FM. It was agreed days before the start of the 2010–11 Championship season that Express FM, a community station for Portsmouth, would now broadcast the commentary for Portsmouth F.C. matches.

=== 97.1-102 in East Hampshire, South West Surrey and North West Sussex ===
The original Delta Radio first broadcast in January 1990. It was the brainchild of County Sound CEO, Mike Powell who successfully lobbied the IBA for permission to put separate programming for the Haslemere district on what was originally intended to be a relay transmitter for Guildford's County Sound. The station was launched by County Sound's Terry Mann, formerly Programme Director of Radio 210, Reading.

After County Sound merged with Radio Mercury to form Allied Radio, Delta Radio was closed down by its new owners in 1992 and the transmitter went back to being a relay. However, when Mike Powell's UKRD Group won the Guildford licence (after it came up for renewal), Delta Radio was relaunched in 1996. Wey Valley Radio had already been operating as a full-time service in nearby Alton and Four Marks since 1992. This station was launched as a "community" station by David Way and Paul Mann after years of campaigning for such a licence. David Way and Paul Wisdom are the new Wey Valley Radio licence holders today. It was acquired by UKRD in 1994.

The decision to merge the two stations operationally was made in 1998 and the Wey Valley service was renamed Delta, and then in 2000, the Haslemere licence (which had previously been a part of the Surrey and North East Hampshire franchise) was merged with the Alton licence to finally form a single radio station.

== Play Radio ==
On 28 May 2009, Radio Hampshire ceased broadcasting due to Town & Country Broadcasting deciding to sell the station. On 5 June 2009, the two licences for Radio Hampshire in Southampton and Winchester were acquired by internet station Play Radio UK.

The new station for Southampton and Winchester, named Play Radio, launched on the 107.2 and 107.8 FM frequencies at 10am on 4 July 2009. As under Radio Hampshire, the station operated a split breakfast programme (one for Southampton and one for Winchester), with all other programming shared across the two frequencies.

== The Breeze ==
In April 2010, the licences were purchased by Celador Radio Broadcasting for an undisclosed sum.

It was announced on 21 June 2010 that the service would be relaunched as The Breeze 107. The new station would be aimed at upmarket 40- to 59-year-olds and broadcast classic and contemporary easy listening music with a slight female bias. It was also announced that the station would relocate, leaving its longtime base at St. Mary's Stadium to share facilities with sister regional station Jack FM in the Kingsway area of Southampton.

Celador subsequently sought and received permission from Ofcom to end the split breakfast programme, meaning that as of the Breeze relaunch, listeners in Southampton and Winchester were receiving identical programming at all times.

The Breeze 107 launched on-air to Southampton and Winchester on 4 July 2010, exactly a year after its predecessor Play Radio had officially replaced Radio Hampshire.

In late July 2010, following Celador's purchase of the Portsmouth licence, the broadcast area of The Breeze expanded.

In February 2011, Celador relaunched their Bristol station Star 107.2 as The Breeze; following this, programmes broadcast to Bristol (outside of localised daily Breakfast and weekday Drivetime shows) are sourced from the Southampton-based station.

== Hits Radio South Coast ==
In February 2019, Bauer Radio acquired Celador Radio and immediately sold the Portsmouth, Southampton and Winchester licence onto Nation Broadcasting, as Bauer already owned Wave 105 in the area.

Bauer Radio retained The Breeze East Hampshire and South West Surrey.

In 2020 it was confirmed that the Breeze stations owned by Nation would be relaunched as part of the Hits Radio network from September 2020, with Sam FM (South Coast) – also acquired by Nation – joining Greatest Hits Radio. At the same time Bauer will combine the Breeze in East Hampshire/south west Surrey with other stations in the South to form a regional GHR service, with a regional drivetime programme and network shows at other times.

On 31 August, at 12pm The Breeze South became Hits Radio South Coast with Jono Holmes hosting the first show.

== Easy Radio South ==
On 19 September 2022, Nation Broadcasting relaunched the station as Easy Radio. In 2026 Easy Radio was rebranded with Nation Radio branding as Nation Easy Radio.

== Programming ==
Local programming is broadcast 24 hours a day, including breakfast 6am-10am Monday to Friday presented by Kate Weston. From 2025 Kate was joined by several of her old colleagues from the defunct Wave 105 (including Andy Jackson, Stuart McGinley and Tim Allen). Unlike other Nation-owned radio stations, Easy Radio doesn’t share programming with any other radio station (though much of it is ‘voice tracked’ by presenters outside of the broadcast area).

== Transmitters ==
Transmitter Site	Frequency	Power	RDS Name	PI Code	Area
Chilworth	107.8 MHz	900W	Easy	C3BA (C4BA Switched)	Southampton & South West Hampshire
Fort Southwick	107.4 MHz	200W	Easy	C3BA (C6BA Switched)	Portsmouth & South East Hampshire
Crabwood Farm	107.2 MHz	200W	Easy	C3BA (C5BA Switched)	Winchester & Mid Hampshire

== See also ==
- Nation Radio South Coast
- Nation Broadcasting
