= Nation Broadcasting =

British media company

Nation Broadcasting Limited
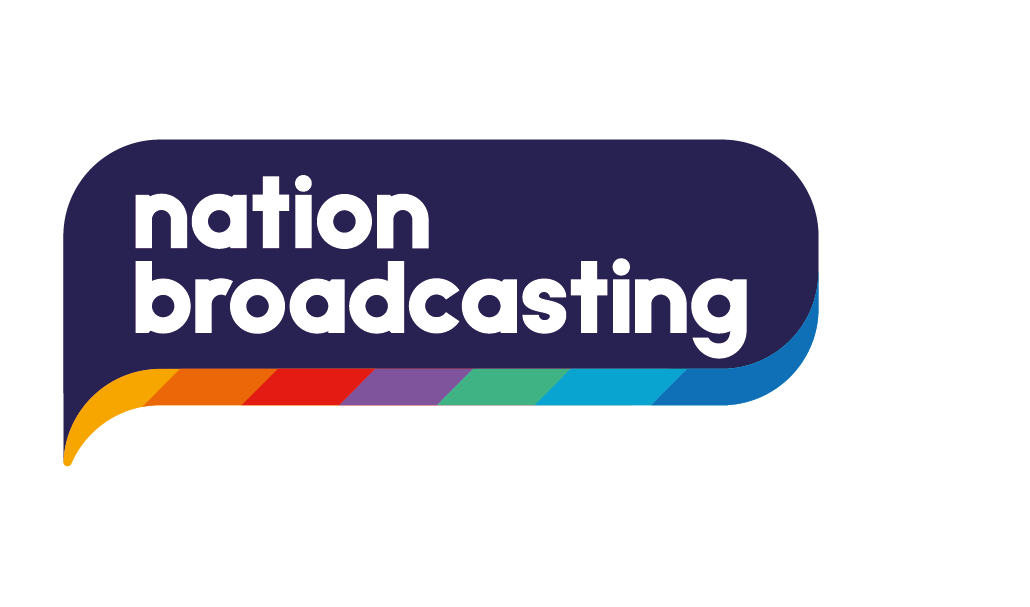
- Type: Private Limited Company
- Industry: Media; Radio Broadcasting
- Founded: 1999; 27 years ago
- Headquarters: St Hillary, Vale of Glamorgan, Wales
- Area served: United Kingdom
- Website: www.nationplayer.com/nation-broadcasting/

Nation Broadcasting is a British media company headquartered in the Vale of Glamorgan, Wales. It currently owns and operates nineteen Independent Local Radio stations across the United Kingdom.

== History ==
Originally known as Town and Country Broadcasting, the Nation name came into being when the company took over XFM South Wales in May 2008 and rebranded the station as Nation Radio.

In June 2018, the company changed the name of Thames Radio to Nation Radio, with this service becoming their national service, with DJs such as Mike Read, Russ Williams and Neil Francis, broadcasting online and on DAB in 2021 from Nation Radio UK's studios in London.

In February 2019, Nation purchased several former Lincs FM Group and Celador Radio services from Bauer Radio, including The Breeze and Sam FM in the Solent region, and KCFM in East Yorkshire, as these stations overlap with pre-existing Bauer assets Wave 105 and Viking FM.

In September 2022 Nation Broadcasting's franchise agreement with Bauer Radio ended. This resulted in a series of changes being made to Nation-owned services in September and October 2022, dubbed 'The Big Switch', which included the removal of Hits Radio and Greatest Hits Radio content from Nation-owned stations in favour of material largely sourced from Nation Radio UK and Easy Radio.

On 1st September 2026 More Radio Sussex and Isle of Wight Radio were sold by Total Sense Media to Nation Broadcasting.

== Stations ==
=== Wales ===
- Radio Pembrokeshire (Pembrokeshire)
- Radio Carmarthenshire (Carmarthenshire)
- Bridge FM (Bridgend, purchased from Tindle Radio in 2006)
- Swansea Bay Radio (Swansea, Neath Port Talbot and South Carmarthenshire. Formerly known by various names, including Breezy Radio and Easy Radio; now back to its original name)
- Nation Radio Wales, (formerly known as XFM South Wales until purchased from GCap Media on 30 May 2008)
- Dragon Radio (Wales, DAB only)

=== Scotland ===
- Nation Radio Scotland (West Central Scotland 96.3 FM, Dumbarton 103.0 FM and Helensburgh 106.9 FM)

=== Greater London ===
- Nation Radio UK

=== North East England ===
- Nation Radio North East, formerly known as Sun FM, which was acquired from UKRD in April 2018. Since March 2020, the former Durham FM and Alpha 103.2 were added to Sun FM, following the purchase of these licenses from Helius Media Group. On 1 May 2024, the station was rebranded to Nation Radio North East.

=== South East England ===
- Isle of Wight Radio
- More Radio Eastbourne
- More Radio Hastings
- More Radio Mid-Sussex
- More Radio Worthing
- Nation Radio South
- Nation Easy Radio

=== South West England ===
- Nation Radio Westcountry
- Radio Exe, purchased from Exe Broadcasting in April 2026.

=== Yorkshire ===
- Nation Radio East Yorkshire

=== East of England ===
- Nation Radio Suffolk

=== Digital services ===
Nation Broadcasting runs a suite of digital-first thematic music stations, available via DAB+ transmission in a select number of areas, and UK-wide online. As at October 2024, these include:

- Nation 60s (since 1 December 2021)
- Nation 70s
- Nation 80s

Nation 80's as of April 2026 is available on DAB: Alnwick and Morpeth small-scale 8B / Ayr 11B / Central Scotland 11D / Ceredigion 9C Hull small-scale 9B London 2 12A Mid & West Wales 12D Morecambe Bay 11B Wrexham, Chester and Liverpool 10D Newcastle and Gateshead small-scale 8A North Wales 10D South East Wales 12C Suffolk 10C Tynemouth_S.Shields small-scale 9B Salisbury small-scale 8A Darlington_Bishop small-scale 9B Oxfordshire 10B Cambridge 11C Essex 12D Norfolk 10B Hertfordshire, Bedfordshire and Buckinghamshire 10D Kent 11C Coventry 12D Derbyshire 10B Northamptonshire 10C Nottinghamshire 12C Peterborough 12D Wolverhampton & Shropshire 11B Bournemouth 11B South Hampshire 11C West Wiltshire 10D Bristol and Bath 11B Cornwall 11B Exeter and Torbay 11C Plymouth 12D Swindon 11C

- Nation 90s
- Nation 00s (on DAB+ across Sailsbury)
- Nation Hits (contemporary hit music, on DAB+ across Tynemouth)
- Nation Love (ballads, on DAB+ across Sailsbury)
- Nation Classic Hits (music from the 60s to the 00s, on DAB+ across Tynemouth and South Shields from 1 Oct 2024; previously Nation New – new and unsigned acts – from March 2023, and prior to that Nation Party)
- Nation Dance (upbeat music, on DAB+ across Sailsbury)
- Nation Rocks (guitar music, on DAB+ across Sailsbury since 1 August 2021)

These stations mostly utilise small superlocal UK DAB multiplexes – as at 2024, in Salisbury, Portsmouth, Basingstoke, West Hull, Tynemouth/South Shields, Glasgow and Wrexham – to broadcast, though Nation 80s is the most widely distributed, also carried on several of the full-line local DAB multiplexes in Wales. Nation 90s is set to launch on DAB+ in North West Wales later in March 2025 and one of those in London.

Many of the stations were previously carried on small-scale DAB in Glasgow, but this ended with the closure of the Trial Glasgow multiplex in autumn 2021 (in preparation for the new permanent franchise, won by Nation but later sold to Like Media Group; the launch of Like's multiplex in August 2022 reinstated some Nation stations.) A number of Nation's digital stations were offered on DAB+ in the Channel Islands from August 2021 – the launch of the area's digital multiplex – until being removed in April 2023 following the sale of the multiplex to Tindle.

The group also owns stakes in a number of DAB Digital Radio multiplexes.

== Former stations ==
The group had also owned Radio Hampshire – broadcasting to Southampton and Winchester but this was sold to Play Radio, and then operated under the name The Breeze. Following the purchase of Celador Radio by Bauer Radio in February 2019, the Southampton and Winchester licences, along with a Portsmouth licence subsequently added to the network, were sold to Nation due to overlapping with the existing regional Bauer station Wave 105.

On 31 May 2019, Nation closed Radio Ceredigion and its frequencies are now used to broadcast Nation Radio Wales.

=== NME Radio ===
In July 2010, it was announced that Town and Country Broadcasting was to take over the licence to run the NME's spin-off radio station, NME Radio, after it was reduced to an online only service following DX Media pulling out of the venture.

The new NME Radio was launched on Wednesday 1 September 2010 – with familiar group presenters providing live programming for the national NME Radio service. The station also replaced the now defunct Dabbl station on the Cardiff & Newport DAB Multiplex as well as launching a brand new iPhone app.
