= Nation Radio Wales =

Regional radio station in Wales

Coordinates: 51.6585°N 3.8323°W

Nation Radio
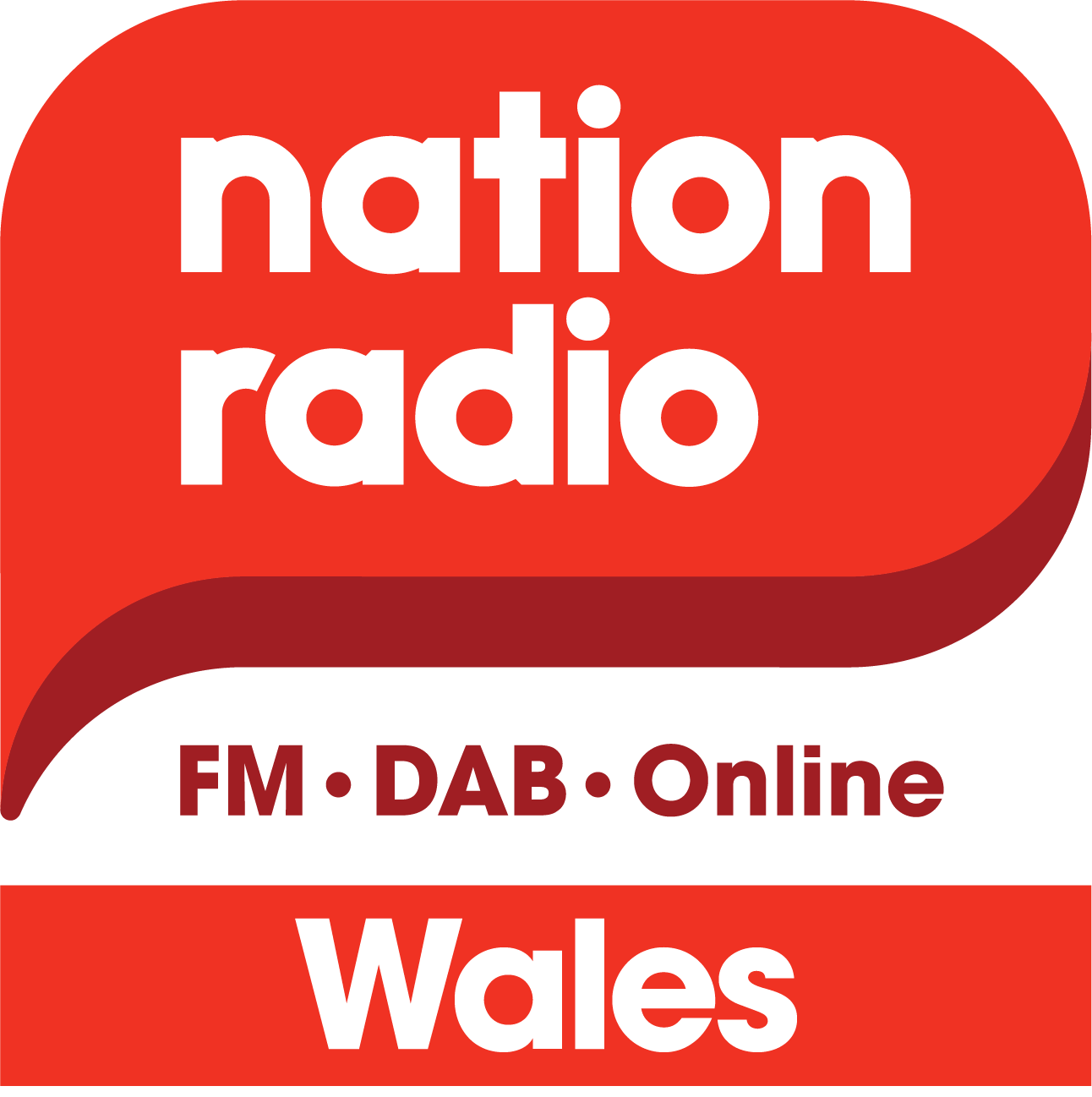
- United Kingdom
- Broadcast area: Wales, North Shropshire, Oswestry, North Somerset and Sedgemoor
- Frequencies: DAB: 10D NE Wales & W Cheshire; DAB: 12C NOW Cardiff & Newport DAB: 12D (North West Wales) FM: 96.6 MHz Lampeter; FM: 97.4 MHz Cardigan; FM: 102.9 MHz Carmarthenshire and Swansea; FM: 106.8 MHz Cardiff and Sedgemoor; FM: 107.1 MHz Pembrokeshire and Aberystwyth; FM: 107.3 MHz Swansea
- Branding: The Best Variety of Hits

Programming
- Format: Adult contemporary
- Network: Nation Radio

Ownership
- Owner: Nation Broadcasting

History
- First air date: 29 November 2007

Links
- Webcast: Radioplayer
- Website: nationradio.wales

Nation Radio Wales is a regional radio station, broadcasting to South Wales, West Wales and North Somerset (including Brean, Highbridge and Burnham-on-Sea) on FM and across North East Wales, North Shropshire and Oswestry on DAB. It is owned and operated by Nation Broadcasting and broadcasts from studios near the St Hilary transmitter on the outskirts of Cowbridge.

The station's music playlist originally consisted of new and classic guitar-led music, reflecting the franchise won originally by XFM, but in 2015, the format was changed to a broader format including mainstream pop music.

As of September 2024, the station broadcasts to a weekly audience of 163,000, according to RAJAR.

== History ==
Nation Radio began broadcasting on 16 June 2008, taking over the regional Ofcom broadcasting licence, which was held by XFM South Wales until GCap Media sold the station to Town and Country (now Nation Broadcasting) on 30 May 2008.

In 2013, Nation Radio increased its coverage area via DAB - it began broadcasting to north-east Wales and parts of Cheshire and Merseyside in March, via MuxCo's Wrexham, Chester and Liverpool multiplex. In August, the station launched in Pembrokeshire and Carmarthenshire via the Muxco Mid and West Wales multiplex.

In December 2017, Nation began broadcasting on FM in Carmarthenshire (102.9 FM) and Pembrokeshire (107.1 FM) Since March 2018, the station has broadcast in stereo on DAB+ in North East Wales.

In December 2018, OFCOM gave the station's owners permission to replace sister station Radio Ceredigion with a relay of Nation. Five months later, it was reported Nation had decided to retain the local service and would request to reverse its decision on the station's format. In May 2019, Nation Broadcasting withdrew its request and Radio Ceredigion was replaced by a relay of Nation Radio Wales as originally planned.

== Programming ==
Regional programming is broadcast from 6am to 1pm and from 3pm to 7pm on weekdays. At other times, the station carries networked programming with opt-outs for news, sport, travel and weather updates.

During local programming, the station also plays a separate playlist to Nation Radio UK.

Most of Nation Radio's programming is produced and broadcast from remote studios with playout from Nation's studios at the St Hilary transmitter near Cowbridge.

=== News ===
Local news bulletins air hourly from 6am - 7pm on weekdays and 7am - 1pm at weekends with headlines on the half-hour during weekday breakfast and drivetime.

National news bulletins from Sky News Radio air hourly at other times.

== Frequencies ==
Nation Radio's main transmitter is at the well-positioned Wenvoe site near Cardiff, broadcasting on 106.8 MHz, serving Cardiff, Newport, the Vale of Glamorgan, Bridgend, Neath Port Talbot, Rhondda Cynon Taf, South Wales Valleys, Monmouthshire, the Brecon Beacons and the Gower A.O.N.B. The 106.8 MHz frequency from Wenvoe can also be received in Bristol, Gloucestershire and parts of Somerset, Wiltshire and Herefordshire.

Kilvey Hill serves the Swansea area on 107.3 MHz albeit with a very small coverage area, Carmel serves Carmarthenshire on 102.9 MHz and Preseli serves Pembrokeshire on 107.1 MHz.

Until 31 July 2025, Nation Radio also broadcast on FM in Ceredigion via three transmitters - Mynydd Pencarreg serving the east of the county on 96.6 MHz, Penwaun serving Cardigan and Newcastle Emlyn on 97.4 MHz and Blaenplwyf serving Aberystwyth and Ceredigion on 103.3 MHz. The station continues to broadcast to the area on DAB.
