= Segensworth =

Business park in Hampshire, England

Coordinates: 50.86949°N 1.25051°W

Segensworth is a business park near Whiteley and Fareham in Hampshire in England. At the 2011 Census the business park was included in the Park Gate Ward of Fareham Council.

== Location ==
Segensworth is located in southern Hampshire between the cities of Portsmouth and Southampton and close to the market town of Fareham. It is off junction 9 of the M27 while rail services are provided nearby at Swanwick railway station. Segensworth has Park Gate and Swanwick to the west, Titchfield to the east and Whiteley to the north.

== History ==
Segensworth was originally farmland which was developed in a joint venture between Winchester and Fareham Council, into an industrial estate during the 1980s due to its adjacency to the M27 which provides excellent access to nearby Ports and arterial roads to London such as the M3 and A3

== Business improvement district ==
Segensworth has been a Business improvement district since 2012, information on the impact provided can be found on the Segensworth Business forum website
