= Wave 105 =

- Fareham; England
- Broadcast area: South Hampshire, Isle of Wight, and parts of West Sussex, North Wiltshire and East Dorset
- Frequencies: FM: 105.2 MHz; DAB: 11B (Bournemouth); DAB: 11C (South Hampshire)
- RDS: Wave 105

Programming
- Format: AC
- Network: Greatest Hits Radio

Ownership
- Owner: Bauer Media Audio UK
- Sister stations: Pirate FM

History
- First air date: 14 June 1998
- Last air date: 28 March 2024
- Former frequencies: 105.8 MHz (Poole)

Links
- Website: Wave 105

Wave 105 was an Independent Regional Radio station based in Fareham, England, owned and operated by Bauer. It broadcast to South Hampshire, the Isle of Wight, West Sussex, Wiltshire, and Dorset.

As of December 2023, the station had a weekly audience of 405,000 listeners according to RAJAR and over 5 million listening hours, making it one of the most listened to regional radio stations in the UK and the most popular station in its transmission area.

In February 2024, Bauer Media announced that the station would be rebranded as Greatest Hits Radio on 28 March 2024 and be known as Greatest Hits Radio South.

Most former Wave 105 presenters including Steve Power, Mark Collins, Tony Shepherd, Andy Jackson, Gary Parker, Tim Allen, Selina Ross and Kate Weston can be heard on Nation Radio South and Nation Easy Radio, whilst Rick Jackson moved to BBC Radio Solent.

== History ==
Wave 105 began broadcasting on 14 June 1998. It was based in a studio complex at Segensworth East, on the outskirts of Fareham, and broadcast on 105.2 MHz (South Hampshire, Isle of Wight, West Sussex, East Dorset and Wiltshire), as well as on DAB digital radio via the South Hampshire and Dorset multiplexes, and online.

News was provided by Wave 105's in-house local newsroom in conjunction with Sky News Radio. In recent years, the station shared a music playlist and many features with Cornwall-based sister station Pirate FM.

On 19 September 2022, the Bournemouth and Poole relay of Wave 105 on 105.8 FM was replaced by a relay of Greatest Hits Radio Dorset, following approval from the broadcast regular OFCOM.

=== Greatest Hits Radio rebrand ===
On 27 February 2024, station owners Bauer announced Wave 105 would be rebranded as Greatest Hits Radio South Coast from March 2024, as part of a wider relaunch involving 17 local radio stations in England and Wales.

Most of the station's local programming was replaced with networked output - including weekday shows with Ken Bruce and Simon Mayo - although Greatest Hits Radio retains regional breakfast and afternoon shows, hosted by Rick Jackson and Mark Collins, alongside hourly local news bulletins throughout the day - and travel updates, provided on breakfast and drivetime shows by INRIX.

However, the regional shows only lasted six months and by Christmas 2024, both Rick Jackson and Mark Collins were moving on with Bauer preferring a GHR national feed across the frequencies. Jackson moved to BBC Radio Solent and Collins joined the majority of his ex-Wave 105 colleagues at Nation Radio South, which had itself re-branded to an all regional format with local presenters and travel information.

These shows are broadcast on the current DAB multiplexes and to match this area on FM, will also be broadcast on 105.2FM, 105.8FM (Poole), 97.2FM (Dorchester & Weymouth), 96FM (Bridport), 97.4FM (Shaftesbury) and 96.6FM (Blandford Forum).

Under the current licence conditions, revised in August 2022, the station is required to produce a minimum of three hours of local programming on weekdays and can share all programming with sister stations in the South of England.

The rebrand led to a number of redundancies and all presenters' freelance contracts were placed under review.

Wave 105 ended regular broadcasting at 10pm on Thursday 28 March 2024, following a short tribute programme produced by the station's head of production Tim Allen. The final song played under the brand was Say Hello Wave Goodbye by Soft Cell.

The station was formally relaunched as Greatest Hits Radio at 10am the following morning.

== Ownership ==
Owned by media company Bauer, Wave 105 was initially created by a group of private investors under the name of The Radio Partnership. The station was then sold to Kelvin MacKenzie's Wireless Group. The Wireless Group eventually sold Wave 105 to Scottish Radio Holdings (SRH) who were acquired by EMAP in 2005.

== Awards ==
In 2023, Wave 105 was nominated for "Station of the Year" at the ARIAS, the leading radio industry awards in the UK. In 2004, Wave 105 won the NTL Commercial Radio Station of the Year award in the category for stations with a potential audience of over one million listeners.

== Transmitters ==
=== Analogue (FM) ===
Transmitter Site	Frequency	Power	RDS Name	PI Code	Area
Chillerton Down	105.2 MHz	10,000W	Wave_105	C3AD	South Hampshire, Isle of Wight, West Sussex, East Dorset and Wiltshire

=== Digital (DAB) ===
Multiplex Name	Bitrate	Short Label	Long Label	Sld
NOW South Hampshire	128kbit/s	Wave 105	Wave 105	C3AD
NOW Bournemouth	128kbit/s	Wave 105	Wave 105	C3AD
