= Nation Radio South =

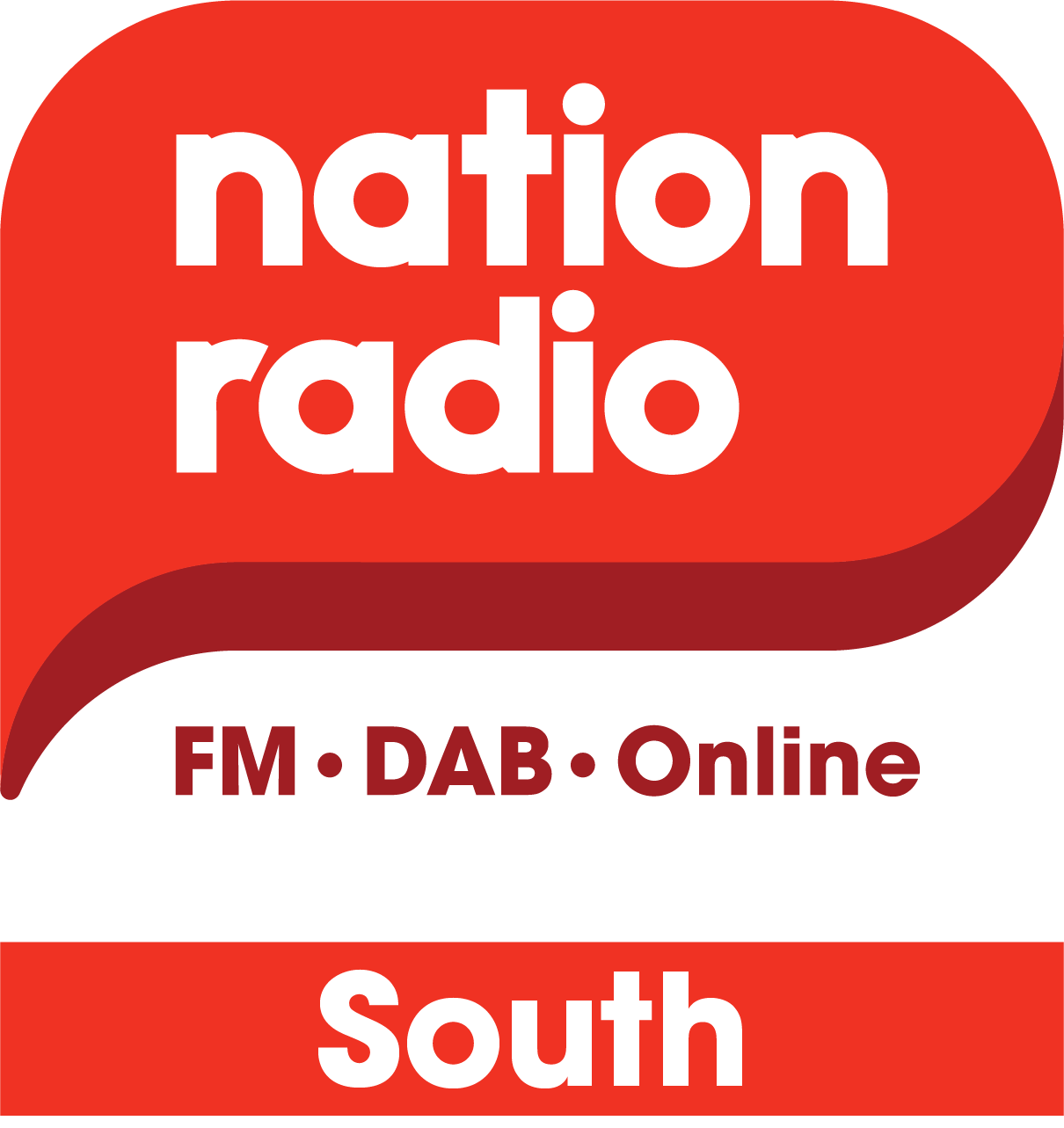
- United Kingdom
- Broadcast area: Dorset, Hampshire, Isle of Wight and Sussex
- Frequencies: FM: 106.0 MHz; 106.6 MHz DAB: 11C (South Hampshire) 8A (Salisbury)
- Branding: “The South's Best Variety of Hits”

Programming
- Format: Classic and Contemporary Hits
- Network: Nation Radio

Ownership
- Owner: Nation Broadcasting
- Operator: Nation Broadcasting
- Sister stations: Nation Easy Radio

History
- First air date: 1 October 2006
- Former names: Original 106; The Coast; Jack FM; Sam FM; Greatest Hits Radio

Links
- Website: Nation Radio South

Nation Radio South is an Independent Local Radio station broadcasting on 106 MHz & 106.6 MHz FM across the South Coast of England, and on DAB on the South Hampshire, Bournemouth, Sussex and Salisbury multiplexes. The station operates as three separate sub-stations (Nation Radio Hampshire, Nation Radio Sussex and Nation Radio Dorset) for news and advertising purposes but all three share common programming.

The station is owned and operated by Nation Broadcasting, and was previously run under a brand licence agreement with rival operator Bauer Radio, where the frequencies were used to broadcast Bauer's Greatest Hits Radio. In September 2022, the agreement ended and the station was rebranded to its current name.

As of June 2026, the station broadcasts to a weekly audience of 169,000 (120,000 in Hampshire, 29,000 in Sussex, 17,000 in Dorset and 4,000 in Somerset), according to RAJAR.

== History ==
=== Original 106 & The Coast ===
The station was originally launched in 2006 as Original 106 (Solent), owned by Canwest, which then sold the station to Celador in August 2008. It was replaced by The Coast 106 on 30 October 2008, and while initial RAJAR results were encouraging with a healthy increase over those posted by Original, the weekly reach stagnated at around 115,000 by early 2011.

=== Jack FM ===
Celador then rebranded the station as Jack FM, to bring it in line with its sister station in Bristol, from 4 July 2011. All prior presenters except Robin Caddy were removed from the station, which switched to a format also used by Celador's other Jack stations - a presenter-led breakfast show (hosted by Bam Bam), a Saturday morning "World Of Sport" show presented by Robin Caddy and automated music interspersed with topical one-liners in between songs voiced by actor Paul Darrow at other times.

=== Sam FM ===
Sam FM South Coast logo used from 2015-2020

On 1 April 2015, the station was rebranded again as Sam FM, which runs with a strapline of We're In Charge - the station controls the music and doesn't play requests - interspersed with topical one-liners in between songs by Gareth Hale who was referred to as 'The Voice of Sam FM'. However, by end of 2019 these one-liners had been withdrawn.

In March 2019, Sam FM South Coast was taken over by Nation Broadcasting, following the sale of Celador Radio to Bauer Radio.

On 1 December 2019, Sam FM no longer shared programming with its sister stations in Bristol and Swindon and took the tagline The South's Greatest Hits. This appears to have had an effect on the playlist, with less rock and more pop tracks being played than previously.

=== Greatest Hits Radio ===
On 27 May 2020, it was announced that Sam FM would become Greatest Hits Radio in early September, after Nation Broadcasting agreed a licensing agreement with Bauer Radio. From 1 September 2020 Greatest Hits Radio was launched at 6am.

=== Nation Radio South ===
On 19 September 2022, the licensing agreement with Bauer Radio ended, and the station relaunched as Nation Radio South.

Following the rebranding of rival station Wave 105 to Greatest Hits Radio in spring 2024, many of its presenters moved to Nation Broadcasting stations to present shows on Nation Radio South and sister station Easy Radio. These included Steve Power, Mark Collins, Tony Shepherd, Andy Jackson, Stuart McGinley, Gary Parker, Tim Allen, Selina Ross and Kate Weston.

The station now operates a local schedule for most of the day, sharing some presenters with its sister Nation Radio stations in other parts of the UK through the use of localised links for each station.

In March 2025, the station further expanded its DAB coverage area by launching on the Somerset multiplex, taking its overall broadcast area to cover a potential audience of nearly four million adults. Nation Broadcasting stated they made the move to increase their DAB coverage in North Dorset where reception of the Bournemouth multiplex is poor, but also welcomed new listeners in Somerset itself who may have been listening to other Nation Radio stations previously.

With this expanded coverage, the station can now be heard on DAB across an area that stretches from Weston-super-Mare in the north to Rye in the east.

In March 2026, the broadcasts to Somerset began to split off from the Nation Radio South schedule for localised programming on weekday daytime; the range of split programming on the new 'Nation Radio Westcountry' will be increased from 30 March 2026 when DAB+ broadcasts of the service expand into Devon and Cornwall though some programming, including Stuart McGinley's evening show, will continue to be broadcast across both Nation Radio South and Nation Radio Westcountry.

== Programming and presenters ==
=== Programming ===
Nation Radio South broadcasts a mix of regional and networked programming. It has the most regional programming out of all Nation Radio stations.

=== Regional Shows ===
- Weekday Breakfast with Steve Power and Selina Ross
- Weekday Golden Hour with Mark Collins
- Weekday Drivetime with Andy Jackson and Selina Ross
- Monday-Thursday Evenings with Stuart McGinley
- The House Party on Friday with Stuart McGinley
- Friday and Saturday Nights with David Francis

=== Local Presenters ===
- Steve Power
- Selina Ross
- Mark Collins
- Tony Shepherd
- Andy Jackson
- Stuart McGinley
- David Francis

=== Networked Presenters ===
- Tim Allen
- Gary Parker
- Mark Collins
- Nation Chilled on Sunday with Mark Franklin
- Tony Shepherd
- Roberto
- The House Party on Saturday with Neil Greenslade
- The Nation Network Chart Show on Sunday With Neil Fox
- Greg Burns

== Programming ==
Outside of regional programming, Nation Radio South broadcasts the Nation Radio London feed, sharing its playlist with local opt-outs for news, sport, travel and weather updates. During regional programming, the station plays a separate playlist rather than broadcast the same playlist as Nation Radio London.

Some local presenters also have networked shows on Nation Radio London, such as Steve Power who presents Beat Surrender on Sunday evenings. Mark Collins and Tony Shepherd also broadcast their shows across the wider network. Nation Radio South presenters also provide cover in other regions.

== Transmitters ==
=== Analogue (FM) ===
Transmitter Site	Frequency	Power	RDS Name	PI Code	Area
Chillerton Down	106 MHz	4000W	NATION	C385 (C485 Switched)	Isle of Wight, South Hampshire, West Sussex and West Dorset
Crabwood Farm	106.6 MHz	20W	NATION	C385 (C485 Switched)	Winchester
West Howe	106.6 MHz	310W	NATION	C385 (C585 Switched)	Bournemouth & Poole

Following the station's previous launch, Coast 106 made use of a restricted service licence from Ofcom to re-broadcast the station to Guernsey. This was done to promote the station to Guernsey residents for when they travelled to England.

=== Digital (DAB) ===
Multiplex Name	Bitrate	Short Label	Long Label	SID	Format
South Hampshire (11C)	112Kb/s	Nation	Nation Hampshire	C2C4	Joint Stereo
Bournemouth (11B)	112Kb/s	Nation	Nation Dorset	C2C5	Joint Stereo
Sussex (10B)	80Kb/s	Nation	Nation Sussex	C251	Mono
Somerset (10B)	112Kb/s	Nation	Nation Somerset	C25A	Joint Stereo
Salisbury (8A)	112Kb/s	Nation	Nation Radio	C485	Joint Stereo

== See also ==
- Easy Radio South Coast
- Nation Broadcasting
