= The Breeze (radio network) =

- England
- Broadcast area: Bristol, Hampshire, Isle of Wight, Somerset, North Dorset, North Gloucestershire, North Somerset, South Devon, South West Surrey, West Berkshire and West Wiltshire, plus East Anglia
- Frequency: All Frequencies: FM: Andover 106.4 MHz Basingstoke & North Hampshire 107.6 MHz Bath 107.9 MHz Bridgwater & West Somerset 100.8, 102.4 & 107.4 MHz Bristol 107.2 MHz Cheltenham & Gloucester 107.5 MHz East Hampshire & South West Surrey 97.1, 101.6, 101.8 & 102.0 MHz Frome & West Wiltshire 107.5 MHz Isle of Wight 107.4 & 107.8 MHz Newbury 105.6 & 107.4 MHz North Dorset 96.6 & 97.4 MHz North Somerset 107.7 MHz Portsmouth 107.4 MHz Reading 107.0 MHz South Devon 105.5 MHz Southampton 107.8 MHz Winchester 107.2 MHz Yeovil & South Somerset 105.6 & 106.6 MHz; Norwich; 99.9 MHz Great Yarmouth & Lowestoft; 103.4 & 97.4 MHz Colchester; 100.2 MHz

Programming
- Format: Easy listening

Ownership
- Owner: Bauer Radio (exc. Solent); Nation Broadcasting (Solent)

History
- First air date: 1995–1999 (as individual stations); 4 July 2010 (stations in West become The Breeze); 9 January 2017 (stations in the East of England join, programming becomes generic)
- Last air date: 1 September 2020

Links
- Website: http://www.thebreeze.com

The Breeze was a network of Independent Local Radio stations broadcasting to Bristol, Hampshire, Isle of Wight, Somerset, North Dorset, North Gloucestershire, North Somerset, South Devon, South West Surrey, West Berkshire and West Wiltshire, as well as in East Anglia as Radio Norwich 99.9, The Beach, North Norfolk Radio, Town 102 and Dream 100. The stations broadcast a 'contemporary easy listening' format, playing classic and recent melodic popular music aimed principally at listeners over the age of 40.

The Breeze network operated on various FM frequencies and was also online at thebreeze.com, and other relevant links for the East Anglian stations. All frequencies branded The Breeze were previously separate stations centred on each of the broadcast areas, which had been acquired and combined into one network, carrying separate breakfast and drivetime programming for the south and the west of England, and a separate breakfast show hosted by Rob Chandler for East Anglia.

Following the purchase of owners Celador Radio in early 2019 by Bauer Radio, the network was closed on 1 September 2020 and replaced by Greatest Hits Radio.

== History ==
The network launched when Play Radio (a combination of two stations in Hampshire) was acquired by Celador along with an additional station in Portsmouth and rebranded as The Breeze on 4 July 2010. The individual stations have all operated under various owners, formats and identities, with the stations having launched between 1998 and 1999 as a series of local stations focused on a specified broadcast area.

In 2011, Celador acquired two Total Star stations in Bristol & Bridgwater, and successfully applied for an FM licence serving the Bath area, and relaunched all stations as The Breeze.

All local programming later became identical across all licence areas, and The Breeze was based in Torbay, Southampton, Bristol and Basingstoke.

In February 2019, Bauer Radio acquired Celador Radio stations, including The Breeze. The licences for Southampton, Portsmouth and Winchester were sold on to Nation Broadcasting, along with Sam FM (South Coast) which also broadcast from the Southampton studios, due to the overlap with existing Bauer-owned regional adult-contemporary service Wave 105. The other Breeze stations remained with Bauer.

As of 13 July 2020, The Breeze network closed, ahead of Bauer's decision to relaunch the stations as part of its Greatest Hits Radio network. They retained their branding but shared the same playlist as Greatest Hits Radio until GHR was fully launched on the former Breeze stations on 1 September.

== Stations ==
These stations comprised The Breeze network.

- The Breeze (Basingstoke & North Hampshire) The station was launched on 16 December 2012 by the merging of three stations in Andover, Newbury and Basingstoke. In August 2017, 107 JACK FM (Berkshire) in Reading was rebranded as 'The Breeze', and added to the Thames Valley feed.
- The Breeze (Bridgwater & West Somerset) launched in 1998 as Quaywest 102.4. It later acquired a station called BCRfm before being taken over by One Gold Radio and relaunched as Total Star Somerset until August 2011.
- The Breeze (East Hampshire & South West Surrey) was originally three individual stations all launched in 1999 – SouthCity FM (Southampton), Win 107.2 (Winchester) and Radio Victory (Portsmouth). Following subsequent mergers and acquisitions the stations were acquired by Celador in 2010 and rebranded into one station. Kestrel FM Haslemere joined the south network on 16 December 2012.
- The Breeze (North Dorset) started on 25 June 1995 as 97.4 Gold Radio before becoming Vale FM. It was rebranded as Midwest Radio in August 2010.
- The Breeze (North Somerset) started on 23 October 1999 as 107.7 WFM before later becoming Star 107.7 and then Nova Radio in September 2010.
- The Breeze (South Devon) started on 26 May 2006 as Palm 105.5, which had previously held three Restricted Service Licences for the Torbay area.
- The Breeze (South West) was created on 29 March 2013 by the merging of four stations in Bristol, Bath, North Somerset, Frome & West Wiltshire
- The Breeze (Yeovil & South Somerset) started in October 2003 as Ivel FM and relaunched as Midwest Radio in August 2010.

These stations joined the network in January 2017, but did not rebrand. These stations are all in East Anglia.

- Radio Norwich 99.9
- The Beach
- North Norfolk Radio
- Town 102
- Dream 100
