= Hits Radio Oxfordshire =

Fareham; United Kingdom
- Broadcast area: Oxfordshire
- Frequency: FM: 107.9 MHz; DAB: 10B (Oxfordshire)
- Branding: Oxfordshire's Hits Radio; The Biggest Hits, The Biggest Throwbacks; Across Oxfordshire

Programming
- Format: CHR/Pop
- Network: Hits Radio

Ownership
- Owner: Bauer Media Audio UK
- Sister stations: Greatest Hits Radio Oxfordshire

History
- First air date: 14 February 1997 (as Oxygen 107.9); Late 2000 (as Fusion 107.9); 2003 (as Passion 107.9); 2006 (Oxford's FM 107.9); 18 August 2010 (as Glide FM); 20 August 2013 (as JACKfm 2); 30 October 2023 (as Hits Radio Oxfordshire)

Links
- Website: Hits Radio Oxfordshire

Hits Radio Oxfordshire, formerly known most recently as Jack 2 Hits and Jack 3 Chill, is an Independent Local Radio station broadcasting in Oxfordshire, England on FM and the Oxfordshire DAB multiplex, as part of the Hits Radio network. It is owned and operated by Bauer Media Audio UK.

The station broadcasts to Oxfordshire from studios outside its broadcast area, in Segensworth in Fareham. It shares a local three hour weekday programme presented by Jono Holmes with Hits Radio Dorset and the DAB only Hits Radio South Coast.

As Jack 2 Hits, it was available in Surrey and Hampshire on DAB and online until April 2020. It also broadcast on FM in Oxfordshire on 107.9FM until it was switched to Jack 3 Chill in 2020 which it remained until it was closed and replaced by Hits Radio.

Hits Radio Oxfordshire competes with Heart South, BBC Radio Oxford, First FM and sister station Greatest Hits Radio, as well as some online community radio and DAB stations in Oxfordshire.

Previously known under a variety of names and formats since its inception in 1997 (see history), most recently Jack 3 Chill, the station launched in its current incarnation on 29 October 2023.

Before moving to Eynsham, Oxfordshire in March 2019, the station was based at 270 Woodstock Road in north Oxford – formerly the site of Six TV – The Oxford Channel.

As of September 2024, the station broadcasts to a weekly audience of 27,000, according to RAJAR. Jack 2 Hits DAB feed closed on 30 October 2023.

== History ==
The origins of the station lie in a student radio station, Oxygen 107.9 which was trialled in November 1995 and launched at 1.07pm on Valentine's Day 1997. It was acquired in late 2000 by Fusion Radio Holdings, which rebranded the station as Fusion 107.9. Fusion merged with the Milestone Group in 2003 and the station was relaunched again as Passion 107.9, but was sold to ARI Consultancy (previously known as Absolute Radio International) in 2006, leading to another rebrand as Oxford's FM 107.9.

In February 2010, the station's owners lodged a request with Ofcom to change the station's format to one that would target listeners over 45 years old. The station argued the "transient" nature of students makes it commercially difficult to market a radio station to an audience that leaves the city each year. Several fans of late night "specialist" shows responded to Ofcom's public consultation as well as local business owners. Ofcom considered this, but the Radio Licensing Committee rejected this proposal. The station responded by saying that changes it had made meant the format change had become less necessary.

On 18 August 2010, after a publicity stunt where it briefly branded as Glee FM (airing only music from the American musical comedy-drama series Glee), the station relaunched as Glide FM. The new format would be positioned towards women.

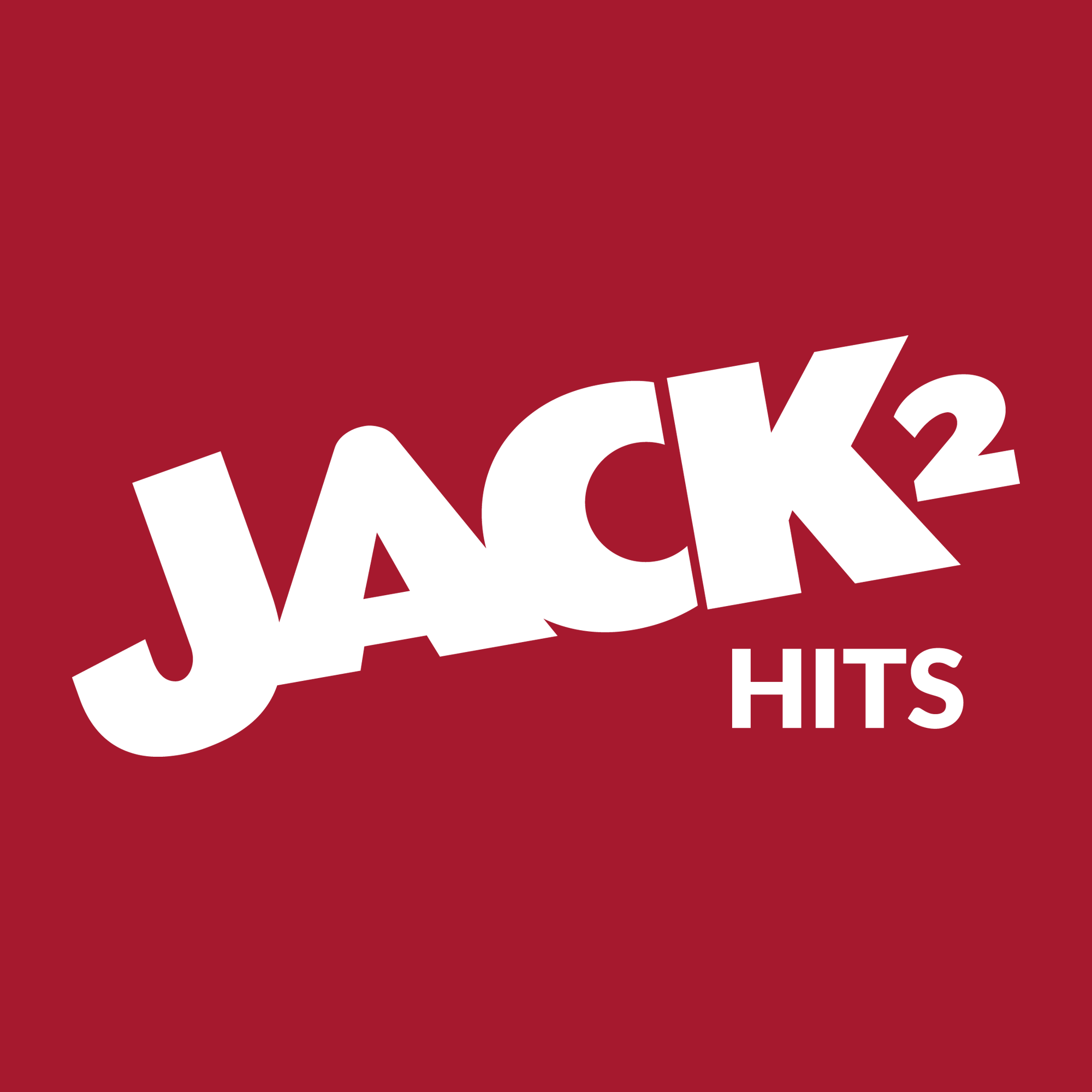
JACK 2 Hits Logo (2020–2023)

The station relaunched again as Jack 2 on 20 August 2013.

As JACK 2 Hits, it was a music-heavy station with only limited speech, instead allowing listeners to control the music and submit recordings of themselves to be played (through WhatsApp or the Jack 2 Hits app). The station was aimed at a young adult-contemporary audience and plays seven hours per week of specialist music as required by Ofcom.

In July 2023 it was announced that JACK Media Oxfordshire licences serving Oxfordshire, including JACK 2 Hits, would be acquired by Bauer subject to regulatory approval. The owners of JACK Media Oxfordshire will retain the ownership of the UK rights to the JACK FM brand, with the Oxfordshire services to be rebranded following the acquisition as Greatest Hits Radio and Hits Radio.

JACK 2 Hits ceased transmission in the early hours of 30 October 2023. The final song played was “Rather Be” by Clean Bandit.
