= CPL Productions =

British production company and broadcaster

CPL Productions Limited
- Formerly: Celador Productions Limited (1979–2009); Grantvenus Limited (1979)
- Industry: Television, film and theatre production, music publishing, radio station operation
- Founded: 23 January 1979; 47 years ago
- Founder: Paul Smith CBE
- Headquarters: Long Acre, United Kingdom
- Area served: United Kingdom and overseas
- Brands: Who Wants to Be a Millionaire? A League of Their Own; Married at First Sight
- Services: Television production Light entertainment
- Owner: Complete Communications Corporation (1990s–2007); ProSiebenSat.1 Media (2012–present)
- Parent: Celador Entertainment (1990s–2007); Seven.One Studios (2012–present)
- Website: Official website

CPL Productions Limited (formerly Celador Productions Limited) is a television and radio production company run by Danielle Lux, Murray Boland and Janet Oakes. It was originally formed in 1979 as Celador Productions, later being conglomerated under the larger Celador Entertainment. CPL has created many popular light entertainment shows and is best known for the TV format Who Wants to Be a Millionaire?. Since 2012 it is owned by ProSiebenSat.1 Media.

== History ==
=== Celador Entertainment ===
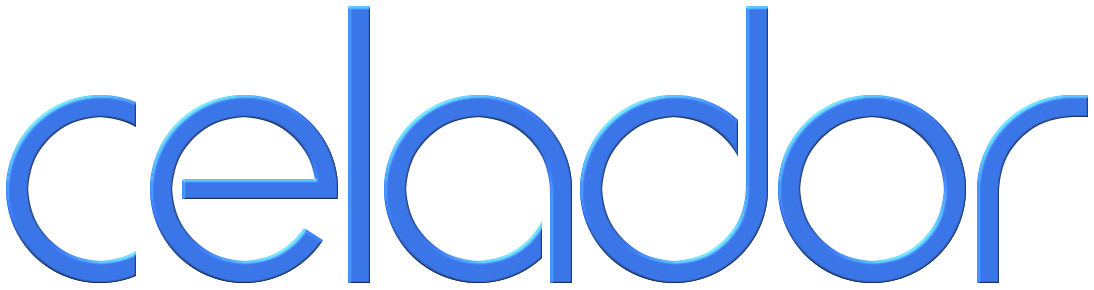
Logo for the company

Celador was originally founded by Paul Smith CBE, and included Jasper Carrott as one of its founder shareholders. The company established itself as a leading independent production company with many stand-up comedy shows and light entertainment programmes on the BBC and ITV.

Celador's biggest hit was the game show Who Wants to Be a Millionaire?, originally premiering on ITV in 1998.

In late-December 1999, Celador formed a feature film division with Millionaire co-creator Steven Knight, Blue Films, announcing Dirty Pretty Things as their first project. Two years later in July 2001, the company formed a factual television division.

In March 2002, Celador International began plans to negotiate distribution deals for formats that the company hoped would have the same success as Millionaire. This move proved unsuccessful, and the company returned to pre-selling in-house projects two years later in July 2004.

In April 2003, the graphic team for Millionaire launched as a standalone subsidiary of Complete Communications, known as Cat & Mouse.

In 2004, Celador commenced legal action against The Walt Disney Company for what it claimed were unpaid profits from the American version of the programme, licensed by Disney for its ABC TV channel. At a jury trial in Los Angeles in June 2010, Celador was awarded $269m (£177m) in damages after the jury ruled that it failed to receive a fair share of profits.

In January 2005, Celador International launched a children's division - Celador International Kids, which would handle acquisitions and sales rights to children's shows such as Roobarb and Custard Too. The division struggled to compete with other independent producers and sales holders, and was shut down the following year.

On 30 March 2006, Complete Communications announced that they had put the format rights to Who Wants to Be a Millionaire? up for sale. The decision was made for Celador to exit the television production and distribution market and focus solely on its radio and film offerings. After a bidding war ensued between interested partners, including Talpa Media, Endemol and Millionaire host Chris Tarrant, it was announced on 30 July that Dutch entertainment company 2waytraffic would acquire the property for £100 million. The deal would also include the Celador International division and its IP assets, which Complete Communications was originally planning to split off under a management buyout with Celador Productions. The deal was closed on 1 December. Celador International rebranded as 2waytraffic International the following year, now including format rights to the company's own properties in addition to those inherited from Celador.

In 2009, Celador's feature film Slumdog Millionaire collected seven BAFTAs, four Golden Globes and eight Oscars including Best Director and Best Picture. In 2009, Christian Colson left Celador Films as Managing Director to form Cloud Nine Films.

In January 2017, Celador Radio acquired Anglian Radio's five stations (North Norfolk Radio, Radio Norwich, The Beach, Town 102 and Dream 100) which broadcast across the Anglian region.

In February 2019, Celador Radio sold all its assets to the Bauer Media Group.

In the last few years, former managing director Adrian Woolfe has teamed up with Claudia Rosencrantz, the person who commissioned Who Wants To Be A Millionaire? originally at ITV, to launch the Studio 1 production company and an entertainment news network called LIT, which has been available to stream via Peacock since January 2021.

In October 2024, Paul Smith completed a sale of the Celador Films catalogue to Pathé UK. The Celador Films division was also included, being renamed to Pathé CFL Limited as a copyright holder for the five film catalogue.

=== CPL Productions ===
On 4 January 2007, Celador Productions completed its management buyout led by managing director Danielle Lux. Paul Smith retained a non-executive role and stake in the company. Managing director and former 1990s Top of the Pops presenter Adrian Woolfe wanted to buy the television division outright as part of a management buyout with Danielle Lux, but this was split into parts with Lux completing the buy-out of Celador Productions without Woolfe and the rights to Who Wants to Be a Millionaire?.

In March 2009, the company changed its name to CPL Productions. In March 2012, ProSieben's Red Arrow Studios (now Seven.One Studios) purchased a majority stake in the company and later took on full ownership.

== Shows ==
=== CPL Productions ===
==== Television ====
- Zero Stars
- Hold the Front Page
- Britain's Greatest Obsessions
- Life and Rhymes
- Tom Allen's Quizness
- Rob & Romesh Vs.
- Trip Hazard
- 90 Day Fiance UK
- Brief Encounters
- Ellie & Natasia
- High Strangeness
- Love Is Blind: UK
- Avoidance (co-production with Ranga Bee)
- Married at First Sight (UK version)
- You Are What You Eat (Channel 5 version)
- A League of Their Own (Sky TV)

==== Radio ====
- Gossip and Goddesses with Granny Kumar
- Hennikay
- Influencers
- Ruby Wax Talking Human
- Scrambled EGG

=== Celador Entertainment ===
==== Television ====
- All About Me
- Britain's Brainiest Kid (format now owned by Sony Pictures Television)
- Canned Carrott (as well as many other stand up shows with Jasper Carrott)
- Commercial Breakdown (originally called Carrott's Commercial Breakdown)
- The Detectives
- Everybody's Equal
- The Hypnotic World of Paul McKenna
- It's Been a Bad Week
- The People Versus
- Richard Digance's Greatest Bits
- Talking Telephone Numbers
- Turn Back Your Body Clock
- Wayne Dobson Close-up
- Who Wants to Be a Millionaire? (format now owned by Sony Pictures Television)
- Winning Lines
- You Are What You Eat (Channel 4 version)

=== Films ===
- Dirty Pretty Things (2002) directed by Stephen Frears and starring Audrey Tautou and Chiwetel Ejiofor
- The Descent (2005) directed by Neil Marshall and starring Shauna Macdonald, Natalie Mendoza, Alex Reid, Saskia Mulder, Nora-Jane Noone and MyAnna Buring
- Separate Lies (2005) written and directed by Julian Fellowes and starring Emily Watson, Tom Wilkinson and Rupert Everett
- Slumdog Millionaire (2008)
- The Descent Part 2 (2009)
- The Scouting Book for Boys (2010)
- Centurion (2010)

== Celador Radio ==
The final portfolio comprised the following radio stations, which were sold to Bauer Radio in February 2019.

- The Breeze (Andover)
- The Breeze (Bristol)
- The Breeze (Basingstoke & North Hampshire)
- The Breeze (Bath)
- The Breeze (Bridgwater & West Somerset)
- The Breeze (Cheltenham & North Gloucestershire)
- The Breeze (East Hampshire & South West Surrey)
- The Breeze (Frome & West Wiltshire)
- The Breeze (Newbury)
- The Breeze (North Dorset)
- The Breeze (North Somerset)
- The Breeze (Portsmouth)
- The Breeze (Reading)
- The Breeze (Southampton)
- The Breeze (South Devon)
- The Breeze (Winchester)
- The Breeze (Yeovil & South Somerset)
- Sam FM (Bristol)
- Sam FM (South Coast)
- Sam FM (Swindon)
- Sam FM (Thames Valley)
- Dream 100 FM (Colchester)
- Town 102 (Ipswich)
- The Beach (Great Yarmouth/Lowestoft)
- North Norfolk Radio (Cromer/Sheringham)
- Radio Norwich 99.9 (Norwich)
- Fire Radio (Bournemouth and Poole)
