= 97.2 FM =

FM radio frequency

The following radio stations broadcast on FM frequency 97.2 MHz:

== China ==
- CNR Business Radio in Shijiazhuang
- TJTRS Tianjin News Radio
- CNR The Voice Of China in Yangjiang

== Ireland ==
- Shannonside FM in County Leitrim

== Israel ==
- Kan Kol Hamusica in the Galilee Panhandle, Gush Dan, Jerusalem, the Jordan Rift Valley and Negev

== Malaysia ==
- KL FM
- Sinar in Kuantan, Pahang

== Singapore ==
- Love 97.2FM

== United Kingdom ==
- Hits Radio Black Country & Shropshire in Wolverhampton
- Kiss in Bristol
- Cam FM in Cambridge
- Q Radio on the north coast of Northern Ireland
- Greatest Hits Radio Harrogate and the Yorkshire Dales in Harrogate, Knaresborough and Ripon
- Heart West in Swindon
- Greatest Hits Radio Dorset in Weymouth
- Smooth East Midlands in Wellingborough
