= Actual Radio =

- Colchester; England
- Broadcast area: Colchester and North East Essex
- Frequency: DAB (NOW Essex)

Programming
- Format: Pop Music

Ownership
- Owner: Actual Radio Ltd

History
- First air date: April 2014

Technical information
- Transmitter coordinates: 51°53′21.34″N 0°54′16.1″E

Links
- Website: Actual Radio

Actual Radio is an Independent Local Radio station serving Colchester & North East Essex in the United Kingdom. Broadcasting via DAB across Essex and Online via smart speaker. The station is owned by Pete Chapman.

The station, serving a local population of around 350,000, broadcasts shows from its studio in the city centre 24 hours a day. The Colchester station has firmly established itself as the main local radio station for the area.

== History ==
The station was launched on the 9th April 2014 by Pete Chapman, a former Essex FM presenter. The company was formed in 2016 and launched in Colchester on the 1st January 2017. On 8 September 2020, Actual Radio launched on the Essex DAB Multiplex. Key people include Pete Chapman (former Essex FM presenter), Phil Terry (former Dream 100 and SGR Colchester presenter), Andre Kimche (former Dream 100 presenter), Dom Atkins (former Ipswich 102 presenter).

== Technical ==
Actual Radio broadcasts to Essex on the Arqiva owned Essex DAB Multiplex. Arqiva currently operates 11 transmitters in the Essex multiplex, Harlow (Rye Hill), Bakers Wood, Westley Heights, Benfleet, Southend, Great Braxted, Braintree, Colchester, Manningtree, Clacton, and Sudbury, which is just over the Essex and Suffolk border.

=== Digital (DAB) ===
Multiplex Name	Bitrate	Short Label	Long Label	SID
NOW Essex	56kbit/s	Actual	Actual Radio	C8EC

The radio station also simulcasts its output online, to provide the service on smart speaker devices and on their website.

== Current presenters ==
- Pete Chapman
- Tony Dibbin
- Emma Saint
- Phil Terry
- Greg Potter
- Martin Roscoe
- Kevin Peters
- Lawrence Ladbrook
- Dave Gowland

== See also ==
- Colchester
- Essex
- Digital Audio Broadcasting
