= Oxford Journal =

- Type: Free weekly newspaper
- Format: Tabloid
- Owner: Oxford Journal Ltd
- Founded: 1973
- Headquarters: Bobby Fryer Close, Garsington Road, Oxford, Oxfordshire

The Oxford Journal was a free newspaper distributed throughout the city of Oxford in the county of Oxfordshire, UK. It was published under licence by Taylor Newspapers Ltd (who also publish other free newspapers including the Basingstoke Observer, Oxford Property Weekly and Auto Weekly).

== Early history ==
The paper was launched in January 1973 from an old toy factory in Cowley by Tony Rosser. It was later bought by Goodhead Press, who sold the paper in 1996 to Courier Newspapers (Oxford) Ltd, owned by Bob Urwin and Peter Chatterton, which continued to publish the paper alongside its own, the South Oxfordshire Courier. Both and Courier and Journal were taken over by the Milestone Group in 2003.

== Mergers and rebrands ==
In 2004 the paper was renamed Courier Journal as part of a merger with the Courier to produce one paper covering Oxfordshire, but this did not last and in 2005 the paper was relaunched in Oxford as the Oxford City Journal; however, in September 2006, the original title was reinstated after Milestone Group sold the Courier group to its managing director. When owned by the Milestone Group, the paper's sister publications included the magazine Oxfordshire Living.

On 3 January 2008, it was announced on that week's issue that the Oxford Journal would supersede its sister paper, the South Oxfordshire Courier. The paper was relaunched in 2012 by Howard Taylor (owner of Taylor Newspapers Ltd) and Chrissie Woodward (sales director of Oxford Journal). Woodward has since left the company and has been replaced by Associate Director Julian Richings.

In the autumn of 2014 the Oxford Journal name was once again retired by Taylor Newspapers in favour of an extension to the Oxfordshire Guardian, which has now closed.
