= Jack FM (United Kingdom) =

Coordinates: 51.777965°N 1.270548°W

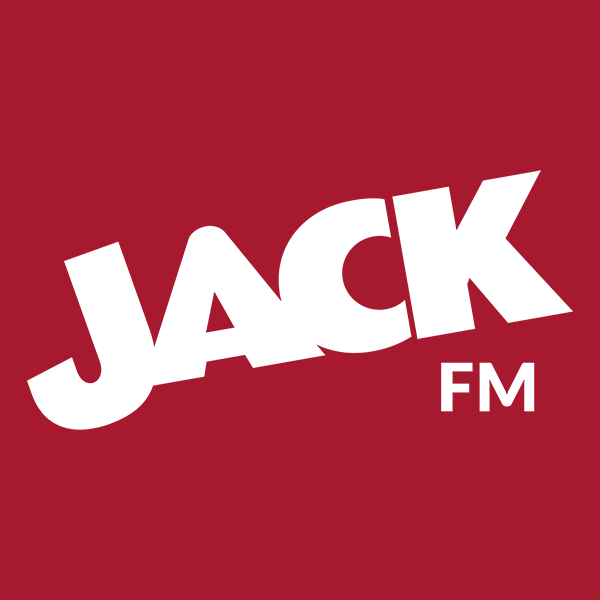
- Oxford; United Kingdom
- Broadcast area: Oxford, Oxfordshire

Programming
- Language: English
- Format: Adult Hits

Ownership
- Owner: Bauer Media Audio UK
- Sister stations: Jack 2 Jack 3

History
- First air date: 18 October 2007
- Last air date: 29 October 2023
- Former frequencies: 106.4 & 106.8

Links
- Website: www.jackfm.co.uk

Jack FM was an adult hits format radio station that broadcast on 106.8 MHz FM in Oxford, Oxfordshire, United Kingdom, and on DAB in Oxfordshire. Between 2016 and 2017 it also broadcast in Surrey and parts of Hampshire. The station shared premises in Eynsham, Oxfordshire, with its sister stations Jack 2 and Jack 3.

As of September 2023, the station broadcast to a weekly audience of 55,000, according to RAJAR.

The station closed at 22:00 on 29 October 2023 following the acquisition of the FM frequencies by Bauer to become part of the Greatest Hits Radio network.

== History ==
In October 2006, ARI Consultancy, who had acquired Passion 107.9 from the Milestone Group, announced plans to launch the UK's first Jack FM format station after winning a broadcast licence for the Oxford area. 106 Jack FM Oxford started broadcasting at 1:06 PM BST on 18 October 2007.

== Information ==
The station is owned by Bauer Media Audio UK and previously Jack Media Oxfordshire Ltd. The radio station is the most awarded Local Radio Station in the United Kingdom, having secured 23 industry award wins in just 5 years on air. The breadth of awards won by the station range from imaging right through to news, programming and the most coveted Station of the Year awards.

Based on the format of the American station of the same name, Jack FM runs with a strapline of "Playing What We Want" and mostly has no DJs across daytimes (and even nighttimes). The music is played out on an automated system interspersed with witty soundbites voiced by comedian and writer Dom Joly, referred to as The Voice of Jack. Joly took over as The Voice of Jack on 4 July 2022, replacing the previous Voice of Jack Paul Darrow who held the role since the station's launch in 2007. Darrow, best known for his role in the BBC's Blake's 7, died in 2019, which left the station without any topical soundbites, but his more generic announcements continued to be used until July 2022. Following Darrow's death in June 2019, Oxford born Jim Rosenthal was introduced as an additional voice to commentate on current affairs. Darrow's soundbites continued to be used on sister station Jack 3 & Chill until 2023.

In 2010, Jack FM became the first radio station in the United Kingdom (except for Forces Radio BFBS) to broadcast live from Afghanistan for a week-long series of breakfast broadcasts in conjunction with the M.O.D from Camp Bastion in Afghanistan. The station returned to Bastion and Kandahar again in 2012 for another series of broadcasts and Father's Day special.

The original logo of Jack FM Oxfordshire

The radio station ran live local news every hour from 6 am till 7 pm weekdays (every half-hour from 6 am to 9 am and 4 pm to 7 pm), and from 9 am till 1 pm on weekends with live traffic reports from 6 am till 7 pm.

Jack FM Oxfordshire's weekday breakfast show was presented by Matt Richardson, who took up the role in March 2023, replacing Iain Lee.

In July 2023 it was announced that the firm's licences serving Oxfordshire would be acquired by Bauer subject to regulatory approval. The owners of Jack Media Oxfordshire will retain the ownership of the UK rights to the Jack FM brand, with the Oxfordshire services to be rebranded following the acquisition. In October 2023, after regulatory approval was granted, it was announced Jack FM would become Greatest Hits Radio with Jack 3 becoming Hits Radio

The last song played on Jack FM was the Ray Charles song "Hit the Road Jack", before ceasing transmissions at 10pm, although due to technical issues with the webstream Disco Inferno by The Trammps was played briefly, effectively making it the last song.

== Sister stations ==
Jack FM developed a number of sister stations.

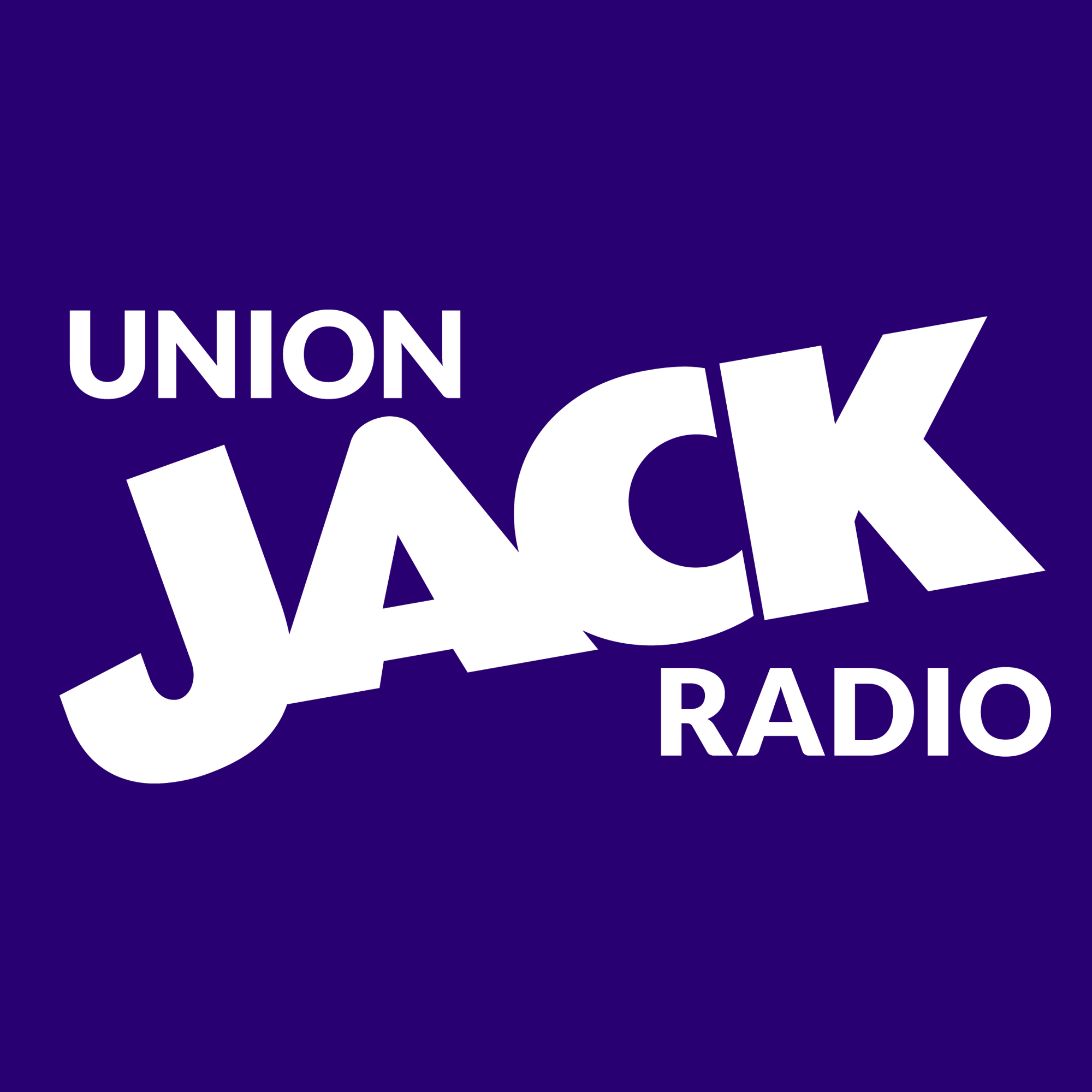
The logo of Union Jack Radio

- Jack 2, branded as Jack 2 Hits, was launched in 2013 and was previously known under a variety of names since its original launch in 1997. It broadcast on DAB in Oxfordshire and previously on DAB in Surrey and Hampshire. It closed in October 2023 with the last song being Rather Be by Clean Bandit featuring Jess Glynne.
- Jack 3 Chill was an easy listening station which launched on DAB in Oxfordshire in May 2017. A national variant launched on DAB+ on the Sound Digital multiplex in April 2018 and was replaced by Jack Radio in October. The national and Oxford versions of Jack 3 were two separate streams, and the Oxfordshire version remained available. In April 2020 it replaced Jack 2 on 107.9 MHz in Oxfordshire following a request to Ofcom, although this format change was reverted in December 2022. In October 2023, Jack 3 Chill joined the Hits Radio Network and became Hits Radio Oxfordshire on 29 October 2023. The final song as Jack 3 Chill was Summerfling by k.d. lang.

=== Former stations ===
- Union Jack was a national station broadcasting online, and previously on DAB+ on the Sound Digital multiplex until February 2022, playing music from British artists. It launched on 9 September 2016. Union Jack was a music-heavy station with British-only songs and artists completely chosen by listeners in a Jack 2-like format and interspersed with classic and commissioned comedy clips, mainly impressions done by Josh Berry. The station also featured a weekly programme dedicated to new music titled 'Underdogs', presented by 'Lucy Leeds'. The station, along with Jack 3 and Union Jack, featured voiceovers from Paul Darrow and Jim Rosenthal. In December 2020, two spin-off stations were launched to complement the station, Union Jack Rock, playing only British rock tracks, and Union Jack Dance, playing only British Dance and Upbeat tracks.
- Jack Radio ran from 23 October 2018 until 10 December 2020 on the Sound Digital national multiplex, taking the place of the national version of Jack 3. Jack Radio played music performed by female and female-fronted acts, including classic and contemporary hits, and female artists' covers of tracks originally recorded by male performers.

== Administration of National Services ==
In February 2022, the Union Jack stations ceased broadcasting on DAB and it was later confirmed they had been put into administration. Adam English was made redundant. The stations finally ceased broadcasting on or around 18 March 2022.

== Ali Booker ==
In 2009, Jack FM News presenter Ali Booker, who previously worked for BBC Radio Oxford, began documenting her life with cancer via audio diaries which were broadcast on Jack FM. In May 2010 Ali was awarded the Silver Sony award. A few weeks later the diaries also won Ali commercial radio’s top award – a Radio Academy Gold Arqiva. Ali's diaries were featured in The Sunday Times on 27 June 2010 and The Independent on 1 July 2010. MP Ed Vaizey also paid tribute to Ali in the House of Commons. Ali died on 1 July 2010 from breast cancer.

== See also ==
- Jack FM
- Adult hits
