= South Oxfordshire Courier =

- Format: Tabloid
- Owner(s): Tri-Media Publishing
- Founded: 1981
- Ceased publication: 2008
- Headquarters: Abingdon, Oxfordshire

The South Oxfordshire Courier was a free newspaper distributed throughout the towns of Abingdon, Wantage, Faringdon, Wallingford and Didcot in Oxfordshire, UK. It was owned by Courier Newspapers (Oxford) Ltd and later Tri-Media Publishing.

It was launched in 1981 and in 2004 was renamed Courier Journal as part of a merger with its sister paper, the Oxford Journal. The paper became part of the Milestone Group in 2003. In September 2006, the original title was reinstated after Milestone Group sold the Courier group to its managing director for £50,000.

On 3 January 2008, it was announced that the South Oxfordshire Courier would be retired in favour of the Oxford Journal name, effectively ending the Courier after 27 years. However, a new paper was launched in August 2011 called the Oxfordshire Guardian, which covers the area of the Courier.
