= The Breeze (Andover) =

Coordinates: 51°12′21″N 1°28′44″W

Greatest Hits Radio Berkshire & North Hampshire (Andover)
England
- Broadcast area: Northwest Hampshire
- Frequency: 106.4 MHz

Programming
- Format: Classic Hits
- Network: Greatest Hits Radio

Ownership
- Owner: Bauer Radio

History
- First air date: May 2008
- Former names: Andover Sound; The Breeze (Andover)

Links
- Website: GHR Berks & North Hants

Greatest Hits Radio Berkshire & North Hampshire (Andover) (formerly Andover Sound and The Breeze Andover) is an Independent Local Radio station in England, serving Andover and northwest Hampshire, and parts of east Wiltshire, previously from studios at Eastgate House in Andover. Beginning as Andover Sound in 2008, from 2011 the station was owned and operated by Bauer Radio as part of The Breeze network. From September 2020, the station was replaced by Greatest Hits Radio.

== History ==
Final logo used from 2012 till 2020, as The Breeze.

Originally launched in May 2008 as Andover Sound by ITV regional news presenter Ian Axton (now of ITV West Country), who owned a majority 80% stake in the station with the remaining 20% owned by Tindle Radio. Andover Sound bought out Kick FM, a station serving Newbury and West Berkshire, in June 2009; it was rebranded as Newbury Sound a month later.

Both Andover and Newbury stations were sold to Celador in August 2011. On 12 March 2012, Celador announced Newbury Sound and Andover Sound would be rebranded as The Breeze, falling in line with an existing network of stations serving South Hampshire and the West of England (Bristol, Somerset and West Wiltshire). The rebrand took place on 2 April 2012. In January 2012, the Newbury station was co-located to Andover Sound's studios. However, breakfast and weekday drive-time programming was presented from Basingstoke, with networked output from Southampton during off-peak hours.

In September 2020, The Breeze in Andover and Newbury, along with other stations in the network, were rebranded to become part of the Greatest Hits Radio network as Greatest Hits Radio Berkshire and East Hampshire.

== Awards ==
As Andover Sound, the station won various radio industry awards, including a New York Festivals News/Documentary Special accolade in July 2009 for Remembering Jamie, a half-hour programme on the sudden death of a local teenager. Andover Sound was also named as the Radio Academy South Station of the Year in December 2009.

At the 2010 Sony Radio Academy Awards, Andover Sound won silver in the News Journalist of the Year category (for editor Ben McGrail & journalist Faye Marsh) and was nominated in the Station of the Year (300,000 or fewer listeners) category. In June 2010, the station was named as the Arqiva Commercial Radio Station of the Year (300,000 or fewer listeners).
