= Hi FM =

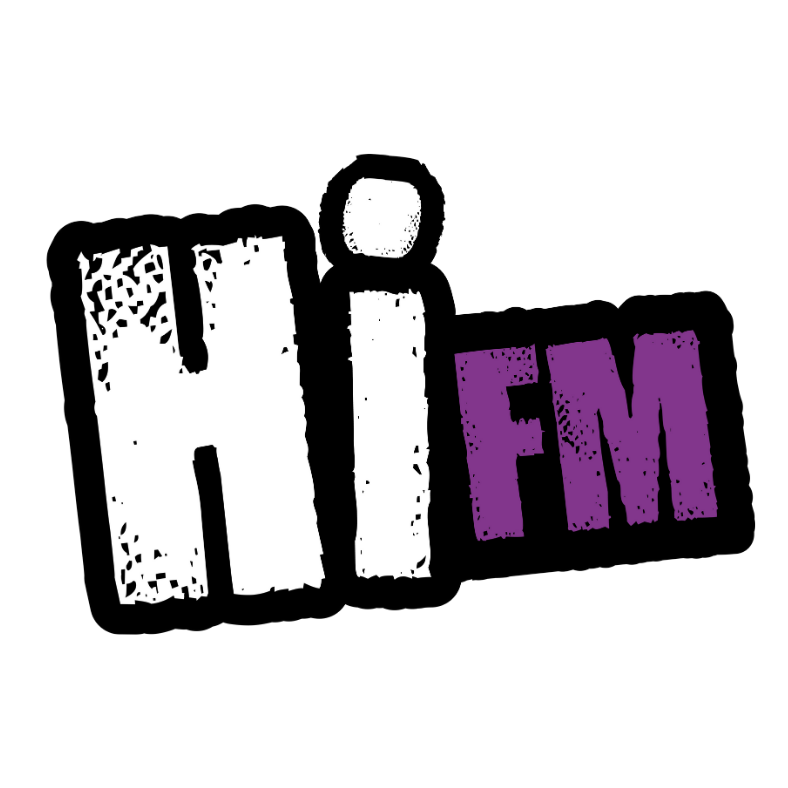

Muscat; Oman
- Frequencies: 95.9 MHz (Muscat); 8 total transmitters

Ownership
- Owner: Entertainment Network SAOC
- Sister stations: Hala FM

History
- First air date: 7 July 2007

Links
- Website: hifmradio.com

Hi FM is a radio station in Oman programming an English-language Top 40 radio format. It is privately owned by Entertainment Network SAOC alongside Arabic-language music station Hala FM. The studios are located in the Muscat Grand Mall.

In 2015, coverage of Hi FM and Hala FM was extended throughout Oman, making them the first private stations with national coverage. Seven transmitters are located in the north, with the only transmitter in southern Oman located at Salalah in the Dhofar Governorate.

Presenters include Robin Banks, who left 107 Jack FM in Berkshire, England, to become Hi FM's program director in 2016.
