= Midwest Radio =

Midwest Radio may refer to:

- Midwest Radio (UK), a radio station in the UK previously known as Ivel FM and Vale FM
- Midwest Communications, also known as Midwest Radio Group
- MidWest Radio, a radio station in the Republic of Ireland
- Tipperary Mid-West Community Radio, a community radio station in Tipperary, Ireland

== See also ==
- Midwest Radio Network, an Australian broadcasting and digital media company
