= The Breeze (Yeovil & South Somerset) =

Coordinates: 50°56′38″N 2°38′18″W

Greatest Hits Radio Somerset (Yeovil)
- England
- Broadcast area: Yeovil
- Frequencies: FM: 105.6 MHz; 106.6 MHz

Programming
- Format: Classic Hits
- Network: Greatest Hits Radio

Ownership
- Owner: Bauer

History
- First air date: 26 October 2003
- Former names: Ivel FM; Midwest Radio; The Breeze

Links
- Website: GHR Somerset

Greatest Hits Radio Somerset (Yeovil) is an Independent Local Radio station serving Yeovil, South Somerset and West Dorset in England.

The station, formerly known as The Breeze (Yeovil and South Somerset), was folded into Greatest Hits Radio South West, as part of a rebrand, on 1 September 2020.

== History ==
The station was originally called Ivel FM. In 2002, the radio station along with YDR FM, Mirage FM and Merlin FM bid for the license to serve Yeovil. Ivel FM was victorious and commenced broadcasting in October 2003.

In its final 13th year of statutory life (2003), the Radio Authority awarded its 150th analogue radio license – on this occasion for the South Somerset area of Yeovil. Four applicants entered the running with the winner being RIL Ltd backed by Launch Director James Richards, now owns and runs Approach Motoring School and Approach Driver Academy Ltd, who came up with the name Ivel FM, because it so symbolizes the broadcast area. Ilchester (Ivelchester) and Ilminster (Ivelminster) from the Anglo-Saxon heritage. Ivel FM offered a friendly locally involved radio station aimed at the 25–64 age bracket, with coverage of local news and information and conversation on life in the county and area. Musically, popular favorites from four decades.

Amongst the management of Ivel FM, there was ex-Orchard FM's Christine Haigh, Yeovil Town's chairman John Fry, local Chartered Accountant Clive Brown and Launch Director James Richards, previously Station Manager of Vale FM in Shaftesbury. In its time, the RA issued what's turned out to be an average of 1 new station per month. Ivel FM became operational in October 2003 covering Chard and Ilminster and Sherborne. The launch was deemed to one of the most successful in the RA's history.

The station's programmer controller and breakfast presenter was Steve Carpenter. He has been presenting the Breakfast Show since 2004 and has worked in radio since 1985, previously at DevonAir Radio, Orchard FM, 107.7 WFM and BBC Radio Devon.

Other presenters at the station included Neil Quigley, who is now hosting a programmer elsewhere, Dan Gold, David Gale, Tim Ley, Phil Clements and Kevin Hann. Scott Temple and Matt Crabb also joined the line up and continued their shows after the Midwest Radio rebrand.

=== First Rebrand ===
The station was sold to Midwest Radio Ltd in a deal along with Vale FM.

The owners subsequently rebranded the station, along with Vale FM as Midwest Radio. The old TLRC branding disappeared, and the stations shared a single website at www.midwestradio.co.uk. The two stations constitute a mini-network with off-peak shows being simulcast on both stations. In 2011 all split shows were dropped and all programming originated from the broadcast center in Yeovil. A single breakfast show was launched with split content relevant to the 'Somerset & West Dorset' (Ivel) and 'North Dorset' (Vale) broadcast areas. The show was hosted by Steve Carpenter, news and sport was read by Greg Bown and the show was produced by Matt Crabb. Former Orchard FM presenter, Laura Jones replaced Matt Crabb before the station rebranded to The Breeze.

According to RAJAR Midwest Radio reached up to 42,000 adults a month with nearly half a million listening hours.

=== The Breeze ===
In December 2011, both Midwest Radio Stations were sold to Celador Radio after Midwest Radio Ltd decided not to contest with the Bridgwater license.

After an approval with Ofcom, both stations have been relaunched as The Breeze at midnight on 25 June 2012, merging with The Breeze in Bridgwater.

== See also ==
- Bauer Radio
- The Breeze (radio network)

Original station name before the rebrand to Midwest Radio
