= Basingstoke, Thatcham & Newbury Observer =

The Basingstoke, Thatcham & Newbury Observer was a group of local free newspapers for the Basingstoke and surrounding areas of north Hampshire, and the towns of Thatcham and Newbury in Berkshire, England. It was published weekly, and was available free for readers to pick up from various shops and public outlets in and around Basingstoke, Thatcham & Newbury.

The newspaper was launched as the Basingstoke Observer in association with local radio station Kestrel FM in 2000, and was owned by the Milestone Group until it was sold in a management buyout in September 2006; following several changes of ownership it ended up owned by Taylor Newspapers Ltd. In June 2015 the Observer brand was extended to titles in Newbury and Thatcham.

It was a sister publication to the Oxfordshire Guardian. The newspapers closed in May 2018.

in September 2018 the Basingstoke Observer relaunched and is now part of Observer Media Group.

In May 2023 the Observer Media Group applied to Companies House to be struck off the register and dissolved.
