= The Breeze (Basingstoke & North Hampshire) =

Coordinates: 51.265461°N 1.083227°W

Basingstoke; England
- Broadcast area: Basingstoke and surroundings
- Frequency: FM: 107.6 MHz

Programming
- Format: Classic Hits
- Network: Greatest Hits Radio

Ownership
- Owner: Bauer Radio

History
- First air date: 16 December 2012
- Last air date: 1 September 2020

Links
- Website: www.thebreeze.com/northhants/

The Breeze Basingstoke & North Hampshire was an Independent Local Radio station serving Basingstoke and the surrounding area of North Hampshire until it was purchased in 2019 by Bauer Radio and became part of Greatest Hits Radio South in 2020.

== History ==
=== Kestrel FM ===
The Basingstoke station launched on 18 May 1998 as Kestrel FM. The previous owners Milestone launched a free weekly local newspaper, the Basingstoke Observer, in association with Kestrel FM in 2000.

In 2010, 107.6 Kestrel FM in Basingstoke was merged with Delta FM in Alton, Bordon, Haslemere and Petersfield. However, initially the old Delta FM frequencies had a separate Breakfast Show, hosted by Dave Trumper. Outside of weekday Breakfast the former Delta Radio frequencies shared with Kestrel FM 107.6.

By 2011, even this practice seemed to have been discontinued, with all areas receiving programming from Basingstoke.

== Celador takeover ==
Up until 2012, Kestrel FM was run by the Tindle Radio Group. The station was latterly taken over by Celador and on 16 December 2012, rebranded as The Breeze.

The station continued to broadcast programming from its Basingstoke studios, from where regional programming for the Thames Valley and local news bulletins originated. The East Hampshire frequencies were moved to the Southampton-based Breeze station and 107.6 to the Thames Valley station.

== Closure ==
The Breeze was purchased by Bauer Media in 2019 along with many other radio stations. On 27 May 2020 it was announced that The Breeze would become Greatest Hits Radio from early September 2020. The station went through a transitional period where its playlist was changed over to the 70s, 80s and 90s era and jingles changed to reflect the station playing "greatest hits". The Breeze was finally rebranded to Greatest Hits Radio South at 6:00am on 1 September 2020.

== See also ==
- Bauer Radio
- The Breeze (radio network)
