= Compass FM =

- Grimsby; England
- Broadcast area: North East Lincolnshire
- Frequencies: FM: 96.4 MHz; DAB: Lincolnshire

Programming
- Format: Adult contemporary

Ownership
- Owner: Bauer Radio
- Sister stations: Lincs FM, Rutland Radio

History
- First air date: 3 June 2001
- Last air date: 31 August 2020

Links
- Website: www.compassfm.co.uk

Compass FM was an Independent Local Radio station serving Grimsby, Cleethorpes and Immingham. Last owned by Bauer Radio, the station broadcast from 2001 to 2020, when it was subsumed by Greatest Hits Radio, as part of its Yorkshire region.

== Licence application ==
Three applications were received by the Radio Authority by 5 September 2000, which also included the proposed Haven FM and Southbank FM, having been first advertised in May 2000. The licence for the station was awarded on 24 November 2000.

== Format ==
Compass FM sat within its sister station's (Lincs FM) TSA (Total Service Area), and the station's format reflected this.

== Programming ==
Compass FM provided 24/7 programming, some of which was automated (where the presenter's links between the records are pre-recorded).

== Transmitter information ==
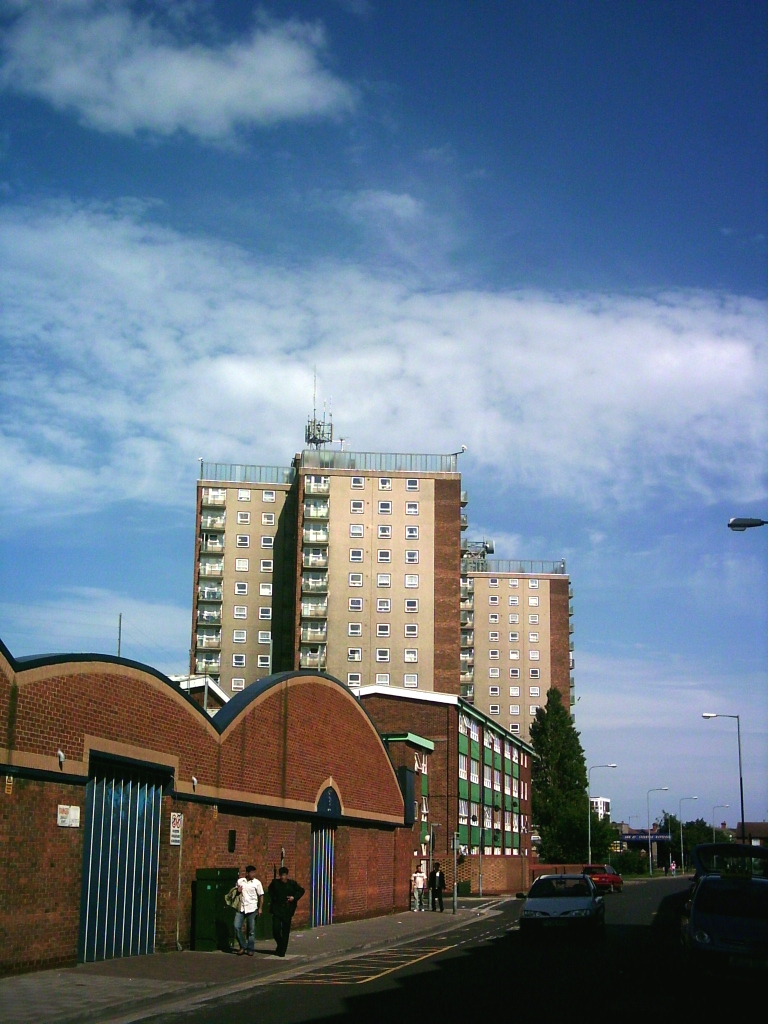
East Marsh flats transmitter

The 96.4 FM signal, now used by Greatest Hits Radio, came from a low-powered transmitter on the roof of Bevan Flats in the East Marsh of Grimsby near the A180 until the building's demolition in 2018. The transmitter is now located on the roof of the nearby Grimsby Telecoms Tower building.

== Awards ==
Compass FM was the NTL Commercial Radio Station of the Year in 2003 (under 300,000 TSA).

== Merger with Greatest Hits Radio ==
On 27 May 2020, it was announced that Compass FM, among other stations acquired when Bauer purchased the Lincs FM Group, would join Bauer's Greatest Hits Radio network.

In September 2020, the station rebranded as Greatest Hits Radio and merged with several other local stations. The station's local breakfast show was replaced by a regional drivetime show. Localised news bulletins, traffic updates and advertising were retained.
