= Greatest Hits Radio South =

British radio station

Coordinates: 52°33′12″N 0°19′21″W

Greatest Hits Radio
England
- Broadcast area: South and South East England
- Frequencies: FM: 96.0 MHz (West Dorset); 96.2 MHz (Aylesbury); 96.4 MHz (Guildford); 96.6 MHz (Blandford); 96.6 MHz (Chichester); 97.1 MHz (Haslemere); 97.2 MHz (Dorchester and Weymouth); 97.4 MHz (Shaftesbury); 101.6 MHz (Fourmarks and Hindhead); 101.8 MHz (Petersfield); 102.0 MHz (Alton); 102.0 MHz (Salisbury); 102.3 MHz (West Sussex); 105.2 MHz (Hampshire & Isle of Wight); 105.6 MHz (Newbury); 105.8 MHz (Bournemouth & Poole); 106.4 MHz (Andover); 106.4 & 106.8 MHz (Oxfordshire); 106.6 MHz (North West Sussex); 107.0 MHz (Reading); 107.4 MHz (Hungerford); 107.6 MHz (Basingstoke); DAB+: 8A (Salisbury); DAB: 10B (Sussex); DAB: 10C (Surrey); DAB: 10B (Oxfordshire); DAB: 11B (Bournemouth & Poole); DAB: 11C (South Hampshire and Kent); DAB: 12D (Berkshire)
- RDS: Grt_Hits

Programming
- Format: Classic Hits
- Network: Greatest Hits Radio

Ownership
- Owner: Bauer
- Sister stations: Hits Radio

History
- First air date: 1 September 2020

Links
- Website: GHR Bucks, Beds and Herts; GHR Berkshire & North Hampshire; GHR Sailsbury; GHR Surrey & East Hampshire; GHR Sussex; GHR Dorset (West); GHR Dorset (East); GHR Oxfordshire; GHR South Coast

Greatest Hits Radio South is a regional radio station broadcasting across the South of England, as part of Bauer’s Greatest Hits Radio network.

== Coverage ==
The seven local stations broadcast to Salisbury, Dorset, West Sussex, North Hampshire, Berkshire, Aylesbury and Oxfordshire from central studios in Manchester, Liverpool and London, and a regional studio in Segensworth, Fareham for opt-outs.

== History ==
After acquiring several businesses in early 2019, in May 2020, Bauer Radio announced many of their radio stations would rebrand and join the Greatest Hits Radio network, including several stations in the south of England:

- Eagle Radio in Guildford
- Spire FM in Salisbury
- Wessex FM in Dorchester
- Mix 96 in Aylesbury
- Spirit FM in Chichester
- The Breeze in Andover, Newbury, Basingstoke and Reading, branded as Greatest Hits Radio Berkshire & North Hampshire

Jack FM rebranded and joined the network on 30 October 2023 after being acquired by Bauer.

In March 2024, Wave 105 merged with Greatest Hits Radio South, but retained additional opt outs for breakfast and afternoon shows in the interim.

== Programming ==
During the week most programming is shared with the Greatest Hits Radio network. A regional three-hour afternoon show is broadcast from studios in Segensworth near Fareham by former Spire FM presenter Martin Starke. Until December 2024, the former Wave 105 area retained an opt out breakfast show hosted by Rick Jackson and an afternoon show hosted by Mark Collins.

Each localised area in the South has their own latest local news, weather and travel news updates.

== Technical ==
List of Transmitters
Broadcast area	Transmitter site	Frequency	Power	PI Code
Alton	Brockham Hill	102 MHz	100W	
Four Marks	Medstead	101.6 MHz	75W	
Haslemere	Haslemere	97.1 MHz	275W	
Hindhead	Hindhead	101.6 MHz	65W	
Petersfield	Rams Walk	101.8 MHz	100W	
Andover	Bere Hill Farm	106.4 MHz	100W	
Aylesbury	Quainton Hill	96.2 MHz	1 kW	
Basingstoke	Fanum House (AA Building)	107.6 MHz	100W	
Bridport	Bridport (Eype)	96 MHz	125W	
Dorchester & Weymouth	Bincombe Hill	97.2 MHz	700W	
Chichester	The Trundle	96.6 MHz	400W	
Guildford	Guildford Hog's Back	96.4 MHz	3 kW	
Midhurst & Petworth	Midhurst	106.6 MHz	400W	
Newbury	Newbury	105.6 MHz	100W	
Hungerford	Hungerford	107.4 MHz	15W	
Poole Relay	Poole	105.8 MHz	625W	C5E5
Reading	Tilehurst Water Tower	FM: 107 MHz; DAB: 12D (Berkshire & North Hampshire)	200W	
Salisbury	Camp Hill	FM: 102 MHz; DAB+: 8A (Salisbury)	1.25 kW	
West Sussex	Hammerpot	102.3 MHz	450W	
