= Rutland Radio =

Coordinates: 52.6706°N 0.7328°W

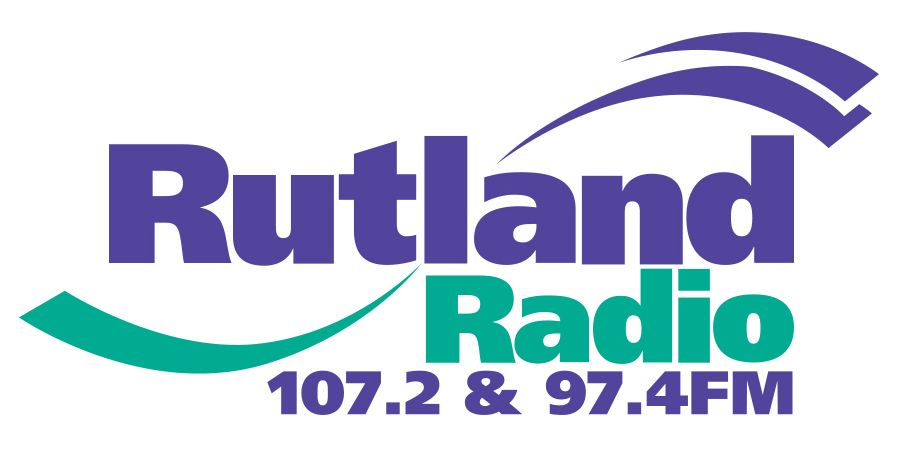
- Oakham; England
- Broadcast area: Rutland and Stamford
- Frequencies: 97.4 FM (Stamford); 107.2 FM (Rutland)
- RDS: Rutland

Programming
- Format: Adult Contemporary

Ownership
- Owner: Bauer Radio
- Sister stations: Compass FM; Lincs FM

History
- First air date: 13 December 1998
- Last air date: 1 September 2020

Links
- Webcast: 64 kbit/s
- Website: www.rutlandradio.co.uk

Rutland Radio was an Independent Local Radio station which served the county of Rutland and the town of Stamford in Lincolnshire. It broadcast on 107.2 FM in Rutland and 97.4 FM across Stamford and launched on 13 December 1998 from Knights Yard, Gaol Street in Oakham.

The station was replaced by Greatest Hits Radio in September 2020, forming part of its Midlands region.

== History ==
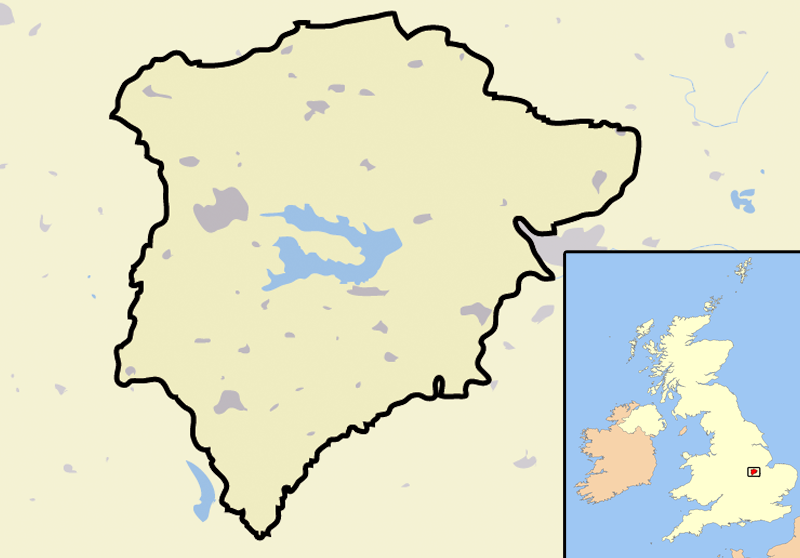
Intended broadcast area – Rutland

The Lincs FM Group received a licence from the Radio Authority to broadcast to Rutland on 4 June 1998, on the same day as announcements for two Leicestershire-based licences in Loughborough and Nuneaton. Although eight stations had applied for the licences by 3 February 1998, only Rutland Radio had submitted proposals for Rutland – the other seven were for the other licences. Rutland had only recovered its independence from Leicestershire a year before the station commenced.

Rutland Radio was officially aimed at people aged between 25 and 54 and broadcast a range of songs from the 1960s to the present day, with local news bulletins through the day and frequent travel updates and local events features. Its morning presenter, Rob Persani, had been with the station since its launch; Rob Persani's final Breakfast Show was broadcast on 28 August 2020. Rutland Radio also broadcast a farming programme at 7am on Sundays, which was produced by Lincs FM and carried on other stations in the group. The show won an Arqiva Commercial Radio Award in 2016.

The station's local community involvement was for Oakham, Uppingham and Stamford.

In early 2010, refocussing of the Lincs FM Group's stations led to the creation of two separate station identities. Stations were either classified as 'Hits' or 'Music You Love' stations. Rutland, alongside Ridings FM, transferred over to the 'Music You Love' log, which had previously only been carried by Compass FM. The music subsequently skewered older with a focus on the 1960s to the 1980s and with only a handful of songs released after the year 2000 in rotation. This format was carried for a number of years until the group brought Rutland and Ridings back into the 'Hits' network in late 2014, with 'Hits & Memories' branding returning in 2017.

Rutland Radio broadcast to Stamford & Rutland from its premises in Oakham. Due to its size, there was a heavy reliance on automation from presenters across the group, but there was an average of ten hours live broadcasting from its Oakham studios every day.

=== Consolidation into Greatest Hits Radio ===
On 8 February 2019, the Lincs FM Group was sold to Bauer. The sale was ratified in March 2020 following an inquiry by the Competition and Markets Authority.

On 1 September 2020, Rutland Radio, along with many of the stations Bauer had newly acquired, was replaced by Greatest Hits Radio. The station's local breakfast show was replaced by a regional drivetime show. Localised news bulletins, traffic updates and advertising were retained.

On 12 September 2023, the former Rutland Radio area was combined with the new GHR transmission on the 107.7 MHz FM frequency in Peterborough formerly occupied by Kiss 105-108 to form "Greatest Hits Radio Peterborough, Stamford and Rutland", also transmitted on the Peterborough local DAB multiplex; Rutland Radio had not previously broadcast on digital radio.

An independent community radio station for the area, Rutland & Stamford Sound, has been established, led by Rob Persani. The new station is governed by a community interest company.

== Awards ==
In December 2009 it won the Sony Radio Academy Nations & Regions Award for the East Midlands. It also won this in 2008, and this award is for stations with a TSA (total survey area) of under 300,000. Coincidentally, Rob Persani is Chairman of the East Midlands branch of the Radio Academy. The station was also nominated at the 2009 Arqiva Commercial Radio awards for station of the year (TSA <300,000).

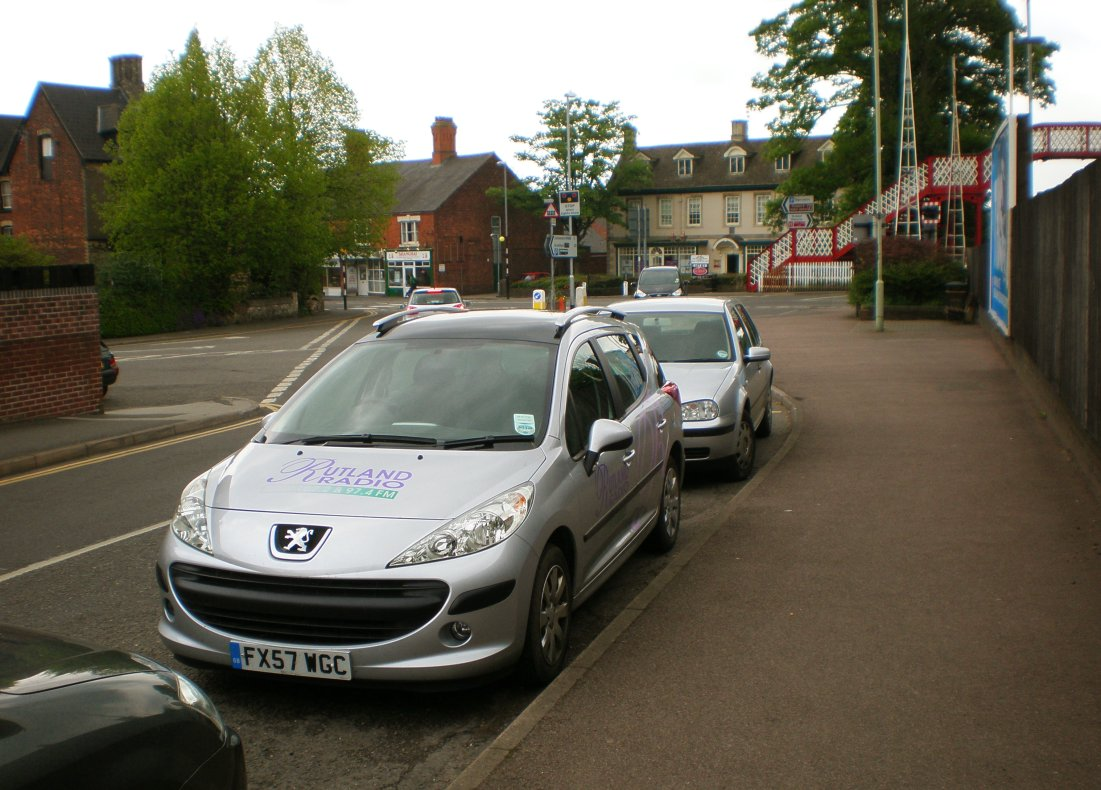
Rutland Radio Peugeot 207 SW radio car near Oakham railway station

== See also ==
- Rutland and Stamford Mercury
