= The Breeze (Newbury) =

- Newbury; England
- Broadcast area: West Berkshire
- Frequencies: 105.6 MHz, 107.4 MHz

Programming
- Format: Adult contemporary
- Network: The Breeze

Ownership
- Owner: Bauer Radio

History
- First air date: 29 May 2000
- Last air date: August 31, 2020

Links
- Website: The Breeze

The Breeze (formerly Kick FM and Newbury Sound) was an independent local radio station serving Newbury and West Berkshire. The station was owned & operated by Bauer Radio and was part of The Breeze network of stations. It broadcast from studios at Eastgate House in Andover. It was replaced by Greatest Hits Radio South in 2020.

== History ==
Originally known as Kick FM, the station began broadcasting full-time on 29 May 2000, although several RSL broadcasts were run beforehand under the 'Kick FM' brand. Another station, NBC FM, run by Bruno Brookes and Keith Chegwin, made a rival application to the Radio Authority to become a full-time station in West Berkshire. The station has two transmitters serving the area – one on 105.6 MHz at Wash Common Water Tower above Newbury and a smaller fill-in unit on 107.4 MHz at the John o'Gaunt School in Hungerford.

Kick FM was bought by Tindle Radio in 2006, and sold again in August 2009 to Andover Sound. At 7am on Monday 5 October 2009, Kick FM was rebranded as Newbury Sound. In August 2011, both Andover and Newbury stations were sold to Celador Radio.

Newbury Sound was named the South Station of the Year at the 2011 Radio Academy Nations and Regions awards. A month later, programming ended from the station's studios at Bone Lane in Newbury and moved to Andover. On 12 March 2012, Celador announced Newbury Sound and Andover Sound would be rebranded as The Breeze, falling in line with an existing network of stations serving South Hampshire and the West of England (Bristol, Somerset and West Wiltshire). Both stations rebranded at midnight on Monday 2 April 2012.

The Newbury, Andover & Basingstoke stations now share the same presenters and programming with separate links, news bulletins, station identification and adverts for all three areas. Breakfast and weekday drivetime programming is presented from Basingstoke with networked output from Southampton broadcast during off-peak hours.

In 2020, this radio station became Greatest Hits Radio.
