= Robin Banks =

Irish media figure – Communication coach, TV/radio personality and content programmer

- Born: Christian Richardson; 22 March 1972 (age 54)
- Occupations: Communication Coach; Media content director; Radio/TV personality
- Website: robinbanks.com

Christian Richardson (born 22 March 1972), known professionally as Robin Banks, is a TV presenter, narrator and radio DJ originally from Kilkenny, Ireland.

== Career ==
He was the narrator of the British/European version of the popular Discovery Channel show MythBusters, from season 2 to the present day. He has worked as a reporter for the Bravo television show Bravado. He has also presented shows for the BBC, Channel 4, Sky1, Living, on London's Kiss 100 and has reportedly presented several guest shows on Galaxy FM. He has previously had radio shows on Radio Nova, Atlantic 252, Virgin Radio, Beat 106 and Xfm.

In 2008 he appeared on BBC's Dragons' Den and received more money than he asked for. Theo Pahitis and Peter Jones invested in Tiny Box Company, which was the UK's first eco-friendly packaging company. It is still trading presently.

Between November 2012 and October 2013 he was the Programme Director at Star Radio North East. He has moved onto new projects after fulfilling his brief to revamp the station and improve its audience figures.

At the beginning of March 2014 he joined Jack FM Berkshire, the relaunched Reading 107, to front the breakfast show.

From September 2016 until September 2024, Banks worked as Head of English radio for OHI Group in Oman where he programmed Hi FM in Oman, including presenting the weekday breakfast show. He was also responsible for all output.. In May 2023 he setup the region's only classic rock radio station called So! Radio.

He has won numerous international awards including New York Festivals and advertising awards.

In the early 2020s, he was one of the presenting team for UMG's range of Now and Clubland branded music television channels alongside Pat Sharp, Simon Bates and Mark Goodier. Programmes he narrated for the channels included Antiques Rockshow with Robin Banks for Now 90s and Robin's 50 Dead Catchy Choruses! for Clubland.

He is now (as of 2026) a communication coach based in Oman and working all over the Middle East.
