= The Beach (UK radio station) =

- Great Yarmouth, Norfolk, Lowestoft, Suffolk; England
- Broadcast area: East Norfolk and North East Suffolk
- Frequencies: FM: 103.4 MHz; 97.4 MHz

Programming
- Format: Contemporary

History
- First air date: 29 September 1996
- Last air date: 31 August 2020

The Beach was an Independent Local Radio station broadcasting to the Great Yarmouth and Lowestoft areas. It used to broadcast from studios in Norwich and Ipswich. Before that it broadcast from studios at the junction of Hollingsworth Road and Oulton Road, in Lowestoft, Suffolk until 8 January 2017 when it was transferred to central hubs in Norwich and Ipswich along with sister stations.

== History ==
In 1993 and 1994, three restricted service licences in Lowestoft were operated and run by local radio volunteers, including some freelance radio professionals, with proceeds being donated to local charities. The station was called "Lowestoft Town Radio" (LTR-fm). LTR presenters included Martyn Lee, Steve Smart and his co-presenter at the time, Matt Denny. Following 30-day trial broadcasts, along with similar efforts in Great Yarmouth, The Radio Authority (now Ofcom) created a new licence for the area. They granted the licence to the group behind the LTR, re-branded as "The Beach".

The Beach started broadcasting on Sunday 29 September 1996. It has been voted The Eastern Region Radio Academy Station Of The Year three times.

It formerly broadcast from studios at the junction of Hollingsworth Road and Oulton Road, in Lowestoft, Suffolk until 8 January 2017 when it was transferred to central hubs in Norwich and Ipswich along with sister stations.

From 9 January 2017, all 103.4 The Beach's programming was shared with North Norfolk Radio, Town 102, Dream 100 and Radio Norwich 99.9, although the five stations kept separate branding (particularly for local travel, events, news and adverts) with programmes broadcast from the studios in Ipswich and Norwich.

On 31 January 2017, it was confirmed that Celador had completed the purchase of the Anglian Radio group.

== Station closure ==
On 8 February 2019, The Beach and Celador's local radio stations were sold to Bauer. The sale was ratified in March 2020 following an inquiry by the Competition and Markets Authority.

On 27 May 2020, it was announced that The Beach will join Bauer's Greatest Hits Radio network.

On 13 July 2020, local programming outside weekday breakfast was replaced by networked output from the GHR network, with The Beach retaining its own branding.

The station was gradually rebranded, with the stations RDS being changed on 25 August 2020 to 'Grt Hits' from its original RDS. On 28 August 2020 the station broadcast its last local breakfast show and on 1 September 2020, the station rebranded as Greatest Hits Radio East. The station's local breakfast show was replaced by a regional drivetime show with its current sister stations. Localised news bulletins, traffic updates and advertising were retained. The station's Norwich studios were retained.

== Transmission ==
Transmitters are located at Mobbs Way, Oulton Broad on 103.4 FM and on 97.4 FM from a transmitter located at a water tower in Blythburgh, Suffolk. A second transmitter on 97.4 FM is located at Havenbridge House office block in Great Yarmouth, Norfolk.
