= Oxfordshire Guardian =

The Oxfordshire Guardian Group was a collection of six free newspapers distributed throughout Oxfordshire in England. Launched in July 2011 the papers circulation in Oxfordshire included editions for Witney & Carterton, Oxford City, Abingdon, Didcot, Wallingford and Wantage & Grove. The paper was published by independent publisher Taylor Newspapers and was a sister publication to the Basingstoke, Thatcham & Newbury Observer group of newspapers. The Oxfordshire Guardian claimed to be the highest circulation newspaper in Oxfordshire.

The newspapers closed in May 2018.

== See also ==
- South Oxfordshire Courier
- Oxford Journal
