= Hits Radio Lincolnshire =

UK Independent Local Radio radio station serving Lincolnshire and Newark

- Lincoln; United Kingdom
- Broadcast area: Lincolnshire and East Nottinghamshire
- Frequency: DAB: 12A
- Branding: The Biggest Hits, The Biggest Throwbacks; Across Lincolnshire & Newark

Programming
- Format: CHR/Pop
- Network: Hits Radio

Ownership
- Owner: Bauer Media Audio UK
- Sister stations: Greatest Hits Radio Grimsby; Greatest Hits Radio Peterborough, Stamford and Rutland; Greatest Hits Radio Lincolnshire

History
- First air date: 1 March 1992
- Former names: Lincs FM
- Former frequencies: 96.7 FM; 97.6 FM; 102.2 FM

Links
- Webcast: Rayo
- Website: https://hellorayo.co.uk/hits-radio/lincolnshire/

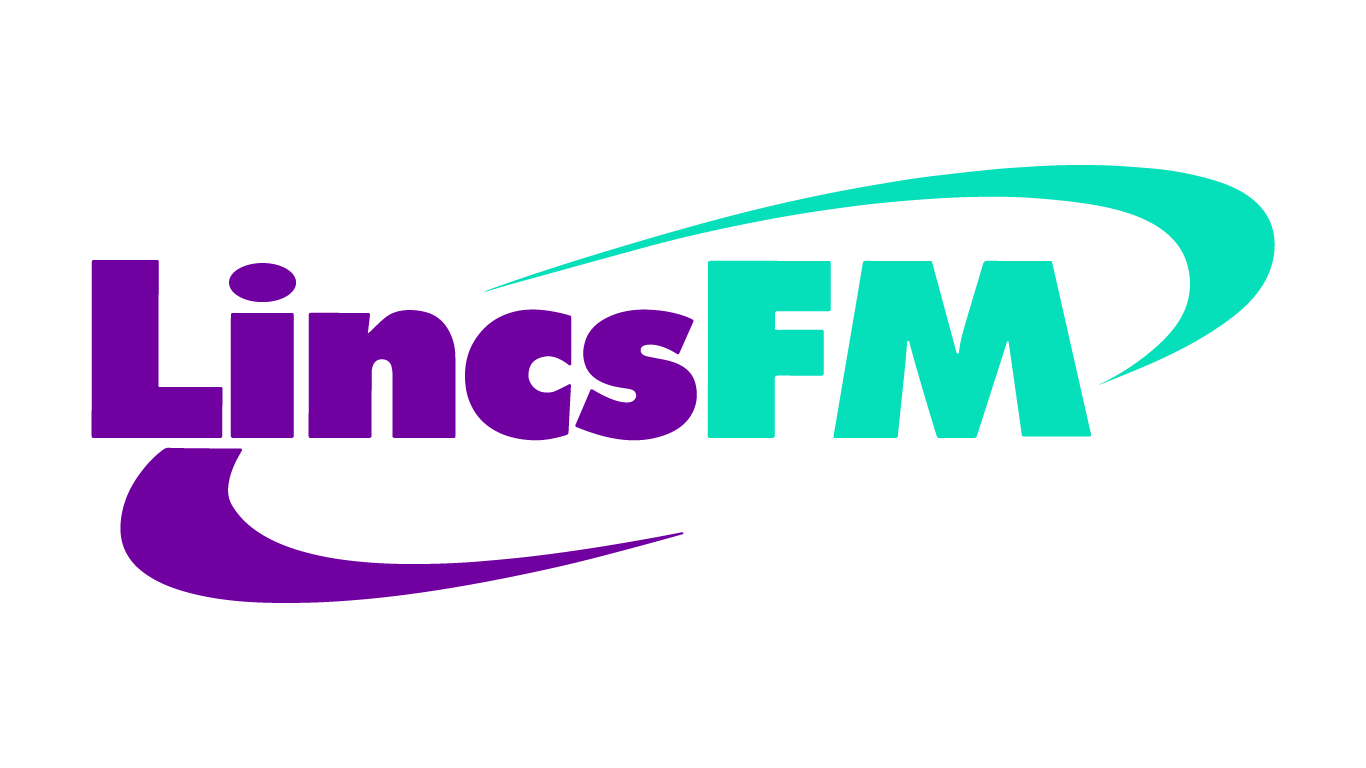
Logo used until 2024.

Hits Radio Lincolnshire is an Independent Local Radio station serving Lincolnshire and Newark in Nottinghamshire. The station is owned and operated by Bauer Media Audio UK as part of the Hits Radio Network. The station has rebranded from its original name Lincs FM on 17 April 2024.

As of September 2024, the station has a weekly audience of 99,000 listeners according to RAJAR.

== Background ==
Lincs FM commenced broadcasting from studios at Witham Park in Lincoln on 1 March 1992. It was part of the wider Lincs FM Group of eight radio stations.

In March 2019, it was announced that the radio station and its sister stations had been bought by Bauer Media for an undisclosed sum.

== History ==
From February 2021, the station began to relay Bauer's networked Sunday afternoon programme The UK Chart Show (Now Hits UK Chart Show - Sam Thompson), replacing the local chart previously broadcast in the slot.

On Monday 23 October 2023, Lincs FM started broadcasting Hits Radio programming outside of breakfast, although The Farming Programme, which aired as part of the Sunday breakfast show, continued to air as normal.

It was announced on 10 January 2024 that from April 2024, the Lincs FM name was to be dropped along with 14 other heritage FM station names in the Hits Radio network, and would become Hits Radio Lincolnshire. The announcement marked the end of the Lincs FM brand after just over 30 years of broadcasting.

On 20 March 2025, Bauer announced it would end its local Hits Radio breakfast show for Lincolnshire. It was replaced by a new national breakfast show for England and Wales on 9 June 2025. Local news and traffic bulletins were retained but the station's Lincoln studios were closed.

The station's final local programme aired on 6 June 2025.

== Programming ==
Hits Radio network programming is broadcast and produced from Bauer’s London headquarters or studios in Manchester & occasionally Newcastle.

== Transmitters ==
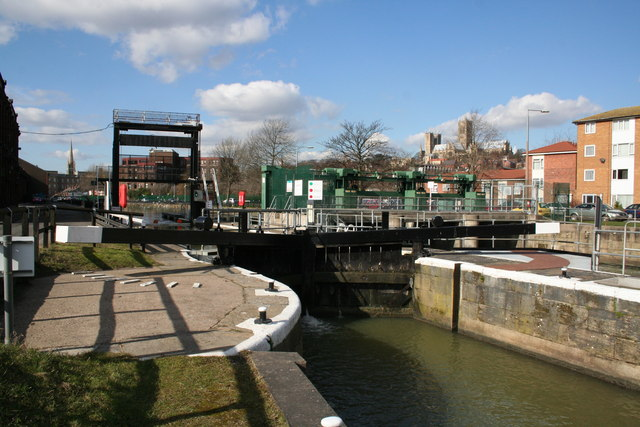
Stamp End lock next to the radio station

The main transmitter 102.2 FM signal came from the Belmont transmitting station. It also had lower-powered frequencies in Grantham, south of the town near the bypass, on 96.7 FM and Trent View Flats (near the John Leggott College) in Scunthorpe on 97.6 FM.Lincs FM could be clearly heard in northern Nottinghamshire and eastern South Yorkshire. The Belmont transmitter relays Digital One and in 2015 a local Lincolnshire multiplex was launched from the site. This operates on the old MXR frequency 12B. The Lincs FM Group broadcasting engineer was Andy Langford.

On 3 April 2023, Lincs FM's FM frequencies were replaced with a relay of Greatest Hits Radio Lincolnshire, with Lincs FM continuing on DAB.

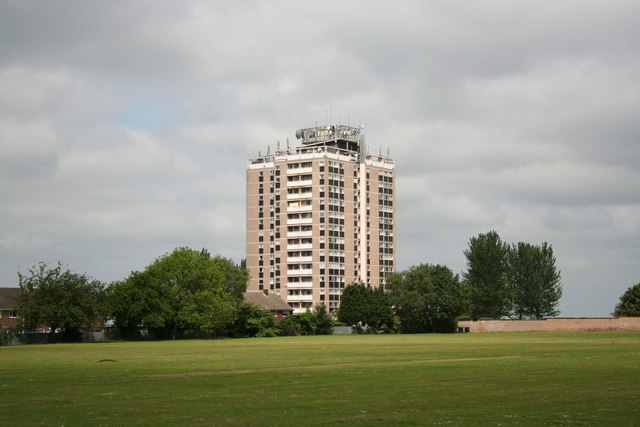
Trent View House transmitter site in west Scunthorpe, overlooks the Trent Valley, and was originally to be a site for the EMAP Digital Radio (now Bauer Humberside) multiplex
