= Vale FM =

Greatest Hits Radio Dorset (North Dorset)
England
- Frequencies: 97.4 MHz, 96.6 MHz

Programming
- Format: Classic Hits
- Network: Greatest Hits Radio

Ownership
- Owner: Bauer

History
- First air date: 25 June 1995

Links
- Website: Greatest Hits Radio

Greatest Hits Radio Dorset (North Dorset), formerly known as Vale FM, is an Independent Local Radio station broadcasting to Blackmore Vale and Cranborne Chase, from Shaftesbury, Dorset, in southern England.

== Background ==

Vale FM started broadcasting on 25 June 1995 using the frequency 97.4MHz from a studio/transmitter site in the Longmead industrial estate, Shaftesbury. A relay was added at Blandford Forum on 16 November 1999 using the 96.6MHz frequency.

In the summer of 2008, Chris Carnegie, the founder and driving force behind the radio station, acquired Vale FM from The Local Radio Company and subsequently restructured and rebranded it. During TLRC's ownership, the station relocated its studios to the Longmead Industrial Estate in Shaftesbury, under the oversight of Programme Controller and Station Manager Stewart Smith. Midwest Radio – a project which saw the combining of programmes and resources with Ivel FM in Yeovil, now also identified as Midwest Radio. Carnegy left in March 2009 to join the BBC and the Midwest stations were acquired by Devon businesswoman Michele Roberts.

Cameron Smith continued to present the weekday morning breakfast show from Shaftesbury during the transition and also recorded a regular weekend 80s show. In May 2010, the Shaftesbury studios were closed, and all program production relocated to Yeovil. The breakfast show was taken over temporarily by David Mortimer and Cameron's long association with the station ended.

David Mortimer's temporary stewardship of the breakfast show ended on Friday 20 August 2010 and Jason Herbert, previously with Wessex FM, took over as the new breakfast presenter from the following Monday.

The Blackmore Vale Magazine reported that Midwest Radio had received permission from Ofcom to broadcast a single breakfast show. However, station manager John Baker stated, "The group had no plans to close either of its centres or to stop broadcasting separate breakfast shows for South Somerset and North Dorset. Although we now have permission from Ofcom to share our breakfast hours, we will not be doing this." Mr Baker implied that broadcasting was continuing from the Shaftesbury studios but this was not the case.

However, by March 2011 the breakfast show had indeed merged, with a single presenter – Steve Carpenter – based in Yeovil and the departure of Jason Herbert. And the fallacy that Mid West was continuing to broadcast from Shaftesbury also had come to an end with the local contact address now being given as "Compton Abbas Airfield, near Salisbury".

The station became part of the UKRD Group In 2020, Vale, along with the other UKRD stations, were sold to Bauer Media and the station was rebranded as Greatest Hits Radio Salisbury in September 2020, as part of their national Greatest Hits Radio network. It now broadcasts national and regional music programmes with local news bulletins.
