= Alison Booker =

Alison Chapman (formerly Booker; 23 June 1963 – 1 July 2010) was a presenter and newsreader at 106 Jack FM (Oxfordshire) and BBC Oxford.

She was born in Exeter, England and educated at Blundell's School. She fell in love with radio at Exeter University, presenting on the uni's own station URE. She claimed her entire career had been an accident (having studied French and Philosophy) as it was the DJ on URE she fancied first, not the show. Her first job with the BBC was with the now-defunct BBC Dorset FM, which is now part of BBC Radio Solent. When her first husband moved the family to Oxfordshire, she talked her way into BBC Radio Oxford BBC Radio Oxford, where she worked for more than a decade.

Alison had two children by her first husband, David Booker; Joanne and Douglas Booker. She made a life and a home in Wantage, Oxfordshire where the children attended the local schools and continue to live. She was diagnosed with breast cancer in 2002. After a double mastectomy, radiation and chemotherapy she returned to her Afternoon Show on BBC Radio Oxford. She tackled it with her usual sense of humour, once joking to a doctor who needed to examine her that she didn't take her clothes off for anything less than a couple of really good meals and a bunch of flowers. Her breast cancer returned in February 2006, having metastasized to her lungs. She married her partner of five years, Andrew Chapman, in May 2006 after proposing to him on air on Children in Need day in 2005.

She retired from the BBC in January 2007. After a year at home, and bored with just waiting to die, she accidentally got freelance work at the then recently launched 106 Jack FM. She went full-time in September 2008. In 2009, she started documenting her life with cancer via audio diaries which were broadcast on 106 Jack FM (Oxfordshire) In May 2010, she was awarded the Silver Sony award. A few weeks later the diaries won Ali commercial radio's top award – a Radio Academy Gold Arqiva. Her diaries were featured in The Sunday Times on 27.6.2010 and The Independent on 1.7.2010. MP Ed Vaizey also paid tribute to Ali in the House of Commons on 24.6.2010. Her diaries are available in iTunes or via Podomatic (see AlisDiaries).

== Death ==
Alison Booker Chapman died on 1 July 2010, of breast cancer, aged 47, at Sobell House Hospice in Oxfordshire. On 24 September, her Cancer Diaries was awarded the Silver World Medal at The New York Festival Radio Awards in the Social Issues/Current Events Category.
