= 107 Jack FM =

Independent local radio station in the English town of Reading

Jack FM Berkshire

Reading, Berkshire; England
- Frequency: 107.0 MHz

Programming
- Format: Contemporary

Ownership
- Owner: Celador Radio

History
- First air date: 22 October 2002
- Last air date: August 2017

Technical information
- Transmitter coordinates: 51.4516°N 1.0471°W

107 JACK fm Berkshire was an Independent Local Radio station in the English town of Reading. The station was based at studios in the Madejski Stadium, home of Reading F.C. and London Irish. The station's transmitter is located on the Tilehurst Water Tower.

In August 2017, it was rebranded as The Breeze (Reading). The DAB version of the station was then rebranded as SAM FM shortly afterwards.

== On air ==
Like all other Jack FM stations in the United Kingdom, the radio station was mostly an automated service with Paul Darrow providing topical one-liners in between songs as the voice of Jack, plus there was a weekday breakfast show "Jack's Morning Glory" with Robin Banks, and there's also the "Sunday Roast" on Sunday lunchtime with Sir John Madejski who interviewed notable local people.

== History ==
The consortium behind Reading 107 FM submitted its bid for a local commercial radio station in September 2001 and the licence was awarded by Ofcom in March 2002. Reading 107 first broadcast at 8am on 22 October 2002. The first presenter was launch programme controller Tim Grundy and the first song was "Listen to the Music" by The Doobie Brothers.

In August 2005, Guardian Media Group (GMG) increased its shareholding in Reading 107 FM from 37.8% to a controlling stake of 60.3% when Milestone Radio Group decided to sell; the remaining shareholding being owned by the Goodhead Group plc, a company controlled by Reading Football club chairman Sir John Madejski. In December 2005, Reading 107 FM changed control again, this time from GMG to Madejski Communications Limited. Reading 107 flipped format to 107 JACK FM Berkshire on 2 March 2014.

Logo of Reading 107 before the station's rebrand to Jack FM
