= Town 102 =

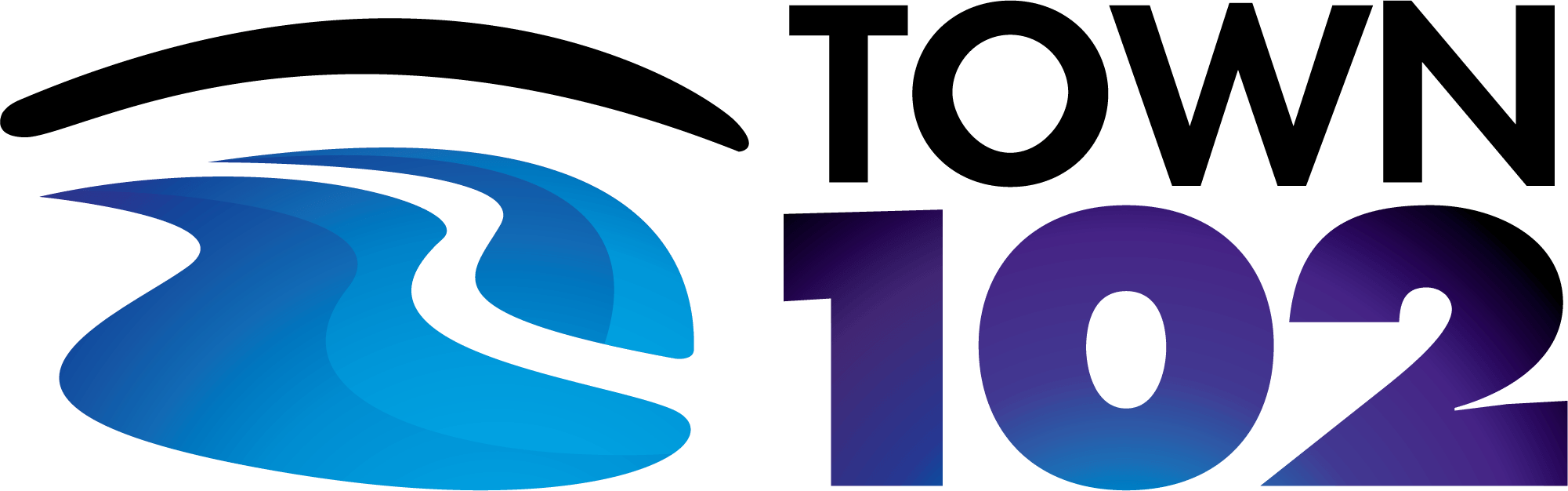
- Ipswich; England
- Broadcast area: Ipswich
- Frequency: DAB: 10C

Programming
- Format: Classic hits
- Network: Greatest Hits Radio

Ownership
- Owner: Bauer Radio

History
- First air date: 19 October 2006
- Last air date: 31 August 2020
- Former frequencies: 102.0 MHz (2006–2018)

Links
- Website: town102.com

Town 102 was an Independent Local Radio station serving Ipswich that was owned by Tindle Radio, Anglian Radio Group and Bauer Radio. It broadcast from 2006 to 2020.

Launched in 2006, in its later years, Town 102 carried identical content to Anglian Radio sister stations Dream 100, North Norfolk Radio, Radio Norwich 99.9 and The Beach, with the exception of jingles, adverts and local news and travel. All five radio stations were output from a single system at Radio Norwich 99.9's headquarters.

On 12 June 2018 Town 102's licence was not renewed when, for the first time since its inception, Ofcom, did not award a re-advertised licence to the incumbent licensee; reasons cited as factors included Town's refusal to broadcast on DAB and the challenger's proposal to broadcast a more local service. Consequently, Ipswich 102 replaced Town 102 on FM on 19 October 2018.

Ahead of the transfer of the FM licence to its new holder, both stations were added to the Suffolk local DAB multiplex in August 2018. This allowed Town to continue transmitting its programming service as a digital-only station after the FM service changed hands.

On 1 September 2020, Town 102 and its sister stations were rebranded to Greatest Hits Radio, airing a regional drivetime show. The former Town 102 then transitioned to a localised version of the Hits Radio service, "Hits Radio Suffolk", from 3 November, in tandem with the GHR affiliation migrating to Town's FM successor, Ipswich 102.

== Programming ==
Programmes between 0600 and 1900 Monday to Friday and between 0800 and 1200 on Saturday and Sunday were produced in Norwich. Some programmes outside these times were shared with The Breeze network of radio stations.
