= Greatest Hits Radio East =

British radio station

- Norwich; United Kingdom
- Broadcast area: East of England
- Frequencies: FM: 100.2 MHz (Colchester and Clacton-On-Sea), 103.4 MHz (Great Yarmouth and Lowestoft), 97.4 MHz (Southwold), 99.9 MHz (Norwich), 103.2/96.2 MHz (North Norfolk) and 96.7 MHz (King's Lynn); 105.6 MHz (Cambridge); 106.4 MHz (Ipswich & Colchester); 107.7 MHz (Peterborough); DAB: 9C (Kings Lynn); 10C (Ipswich & Suffolk); 12D (Essex); 11C (Cambridge); 12D (Peterborough)
- RDS: Grt Hits

Programming
- Format: Classic hits and specialist music
- Network: Greatest Hits Radio

Ownership
- Owner: Bauer

History
- First air date: 1 September 2020

Links
- Website: GHR Essex; GHR Ipswich & Suffolk; GHR Norfolk & North Suffolk; GHR West Norfolk; GHR Cambridgeshire; GHR Peterborough, Stamford & Rutland

Greatest Hits Radio East is a regional radio network serving the East of England, as part of Bauer’s Greatest Hits Radio network.

== Stations ==
After acquiring several businesses in early 2019, in May 2020, Bauer announced many of their radio stations would rebrand and join the Greatest Hits Radio network, including six stations in the East of England:

- Essex - Greatest Hits Radio Essex
- Ipswich & Suffolk
- Norfolk & North Suffolk - The Beach, North Norfolk Radio and Radio Norwich 99.9
- King's Lynn and West Norfolk - KL.FM 96.7
- Cambridgeshire & Peterborough

== Programming ==
The station carries primarily a schedule of networked programming, produced and broadcast from Bauer's Birmingham, Glasgow, Liverpool, London and Manchester studios.

On weekdays, the station opts out of networked programming for a regional three-hour afternoon show from 1-4pm with Heidi Secker, originating from Bauer's Norwich studios.

=== News ===
Bauer's Norwich newsroom broadcasts local news bulletins hourly from 6am to 7pm on weekdays and from 7am to 1pm at weekends. Headlines are broadcast on the half-hour during weekday breakfast and drivetime shows, alongside traffic bulletins. National bulletins from Sky News Radio are carried at other times.
