= Six TV =

Former television channel in the United Kingdom

Ownership
- Owner: Milestone Group (through subsidiary Aroma Television) (2001–2009)
- Parent: Oxford Broadcasting (1999–2009)

History
- Launched: June 1999
- Closed: April 2009
- Former names: The Oxford Channel (1999–2003)

Availability

Terrestrial
- UHF: Southampton: Channel 29 (Fawley); Channel 55 (Millbrook); Oxford: Channel 47

Six TV (alternately referred to as Channel 6 – The Oxford Channel; previously The Oxford Channel) was the sixth free to air terrestrial television channel in the United Kingdom, broadcasting to Oxford and Southampton. It was the final analogue network to be launched after BBC One, BBC Two, ITV, Channel 4 and Channel 5. It operated under a set of restricted television service licences, broadcasting on UHF channel 47 in Oxford and channel 29 in Southampton. It was owned by Oxford Broadcasting, who launched the channel in 1999; the company was sold to Milestone Group (through subsidiary Aroma Television) in 2001, who closed all operations by April 2009.

== Launch and expansion ==
Alternate logo for Six TV

Oxford Broadcasting was founded in 1998 by Debora and Thomas Harding, who both had worked at Oxford-based video production company Undercurrents. They obtained a local television licence, raised the capital to launch the station, set up a broadcast studio in an old nuclear bunker on Woodstock Road, and hired over 60 staff. From the beginning, the channel focused on local stories, particularly sports, business, arts, music and politics.

The Oxford Channel was launched on 6 June 1999. Within a few months, the station's programming had built a considerable following: over 25% of the potential audience of 500,000 watched each week. Advertising for the station was produced by Tom, Dick and Debbie Productions, founded by Debora & Thomas Harding and Richard Lewis.

According to a Reuters Institute report, the channel "also had a strong training programme, made formal in 2000 through the Local Television Training company, that attracted government money to train unemployed young people from Oxford and taught them the skills of broadcast television. This scheme had a high success rate of placing trainees within the television industry."

In 2001, the board voted to sell the loss-making station and its operating company to Milestone Group, through Milestone's subsidiary, Aroma Television. During this transition, most of the staff were laid off by Milestone, who also laid off the station's founders, though a small number of staff remained.

Milestone gained further licences to broadcast in Southampton, Fawley, Reading and Portsmouth in 2003 after the re-advertising of the four-year contracts, and renewed its contract to broadcast to Oxford. The station was re-branded as Six TV in anticipation of the launch of these services.

The channel broadcast a 24-hour service, seven days a week. Local programmes included a motoring show V6 presented by Chris Ford, an interactive music programme OX900, and wildlife series Wild, which was nominated for an RTS Award. It also introduced a children's section, local sports, and local news under the guidance of managing director, Nigel Taylor.

== Fate ==
The channel's contract to broadcast was set to expire on 30 June 2007; however, Ofcom confirmed that all RSL licences would be extended until the 2012 digital switchover but gave no undertaking that a digital licence would be granted. Milestone concluded that the lack of certainty rendered the stations non-viable, and all channels had ceased broadcasting by April 2009, including the original Oxford channel.

== See also ==
- Local television in the United Kingdom
