= The Breeze (North Dorset) =

Coordinates: 51°00′34″N 2°11′25″W

- England
- Broadcast area: North Dorset
- Frequencies: FM: 96.6 & 97.4 MHz

Programming
- Format: Classic hits

Ownership
- Owner: Bauer Radio

History
- First air date: 25 June 1995
- Last air date: September 1, 2020, subsumed into Greatest Hits Radio
- Former names: Gold Radio (1995–), Midwest Radio (–2012)

The Breeze (North Dorset) was an Independent Local Radio station serving North Dorset from 1995 to 2020.

== History ==
The station launched on 25 June 1995 as Gold Radio (after Gold Hill, Shaftesbury rather than the oldies format) then later became Vale FM when the station was acquired by TLRC. The station was bought by, and relaunched as, Midwest Radio when it, and neighbouring station Ivel FM, were merged when TLRC sold the stations.

In July 2008, Radio industry regulator Ofcom approved plans for the two stations to share 20 hours of output per day, saying the distance between stations was such that the relevance of regionalised programming was a sensible move for both, and represented a way of allowing smaller stations to operate more effectively without adverse effects for listeners. Despite this, the two separate licences continued to broadcast different breakfast shows on weekdays.

In August 2010 the two stations finally merged to create a single Midwest station across south Somerset and north Dorset, broadcasting from studios in Yeovil and Shaftesbury.

In December 2011, the Midwest stations were sold to Celador Radio, after Midwest Radio Ltd decided not to contest the Bridgwater licence.

=== Rebrand as The Breeze ===
After an approval request with Ofcom, both stations relaunched as The Breeze at midnight on 25 June 2012, merging with The Breeze in Bridgwater.

== Closure ==
Logo used from 2012 till 2020 when it was called The Breeze (North Dorset).

The Breeze was purchased by Bauer Media in 2019 along with many other radio stations. On 27 May 2020 it was announced that The Breeze will become Greatest Hits Radio from early September 2020. The station went through a transitional period where its playlist was changed over to the 70's, 80's and 90's era and jingles changed to reflect the station playing "greatest hits". The Breeze was finally rebranded to Greatest Hits Radio at 6:00am on 1 September 2020.

== See also ==
- Bauer Radio
- The Breeze (radio network)
