= First FM =

- England
- Broadcast area: Oxford, UK
- Frequency: 105.1 FM

Ownership
- Owner: OX4 FM CIC

History
- First air date: 14 February 2014

Links
- Website: www.first105.com

First FM is a local radio station based in Oxford, England broadcasting to Oxford and the surrounding area. The station is licensed by Ofcom and broadcasts on 105.1 FM in Oxford and also online.

== History ==
Logo used from 2014-2017

The station launched as "Destiny 105" on 14 February 2014, taking the place of the previously licensed station OX105 which had been found in breach by Ofcom for failing to provide the licensed service. The 105.1 FM Oxford license is held by OX4 FM Community Interest Company. Following the collapse of previous station OX105 in 2013, the 105.1 service was transferred to a new management team of experienced broadcasters who then faced the challenge of acquiring and building new studios at short notice.

Following this change of management the license was re-branded and the station re-launched initially as Destiny 105 on 14 February 2014 from new studios in East Oxford, with equipment and facilities provided by Broadcast Ltd. On 15 January 2018 the station re-branded with new on air identity "First FM".

== Format ==
During the day, First 105.1 FM plays a mainstream cross genre selection of music, interspersed with news, information and other items relevant to the local community. During evenings, specialist shows cover a wide range of music and information of all types.

== Technology ==
First 105.1 FM is notable in that the studios run almost entirely using open-source software, with Linux used extensively throughout the station.
