= Nation Radio Suffolk =

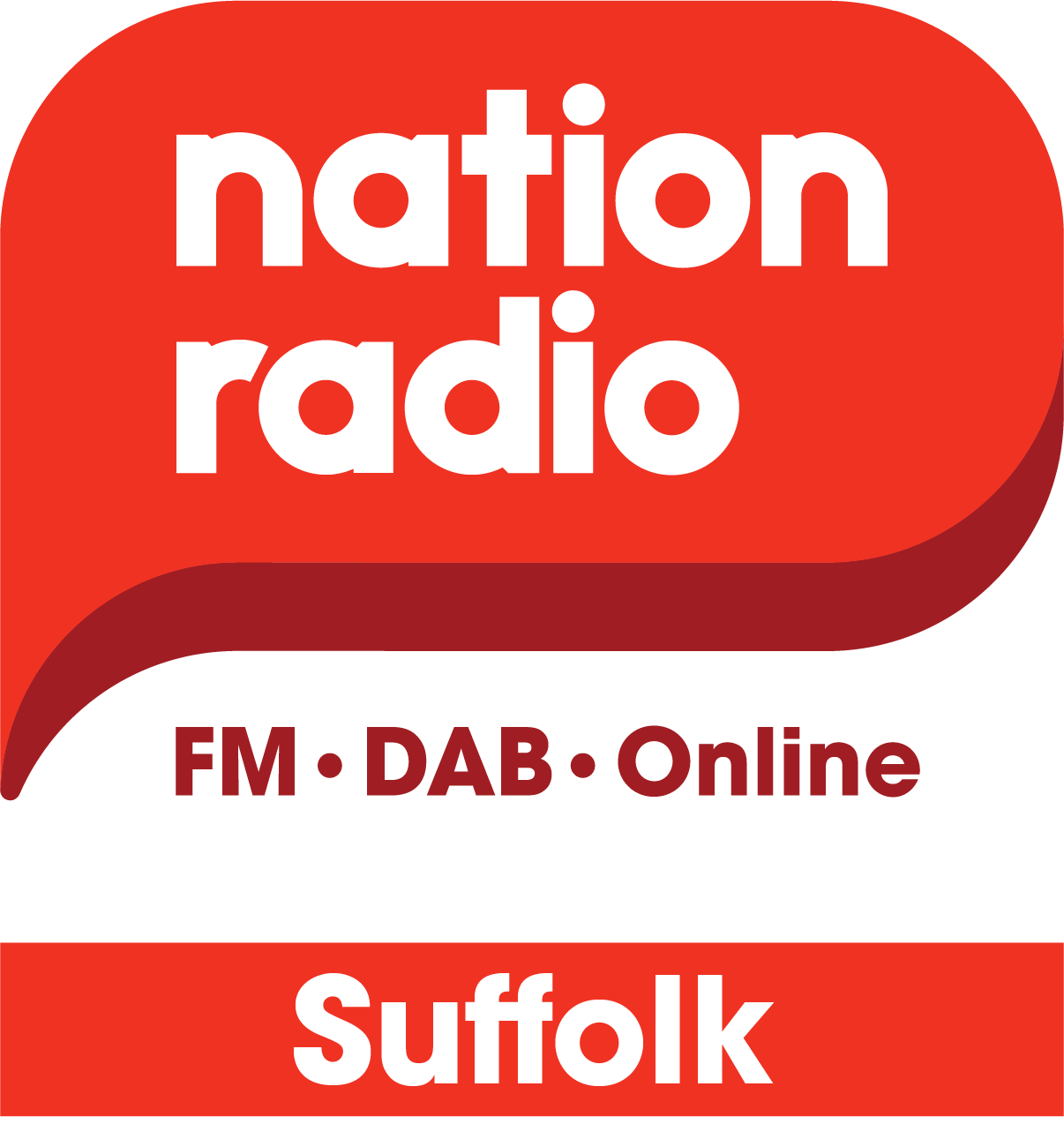
- Ipswich; United Kingdom
- Broadcast area: Suffolk and North Essex
- Frequencies: FM: 102.0 MHz; DAB: 10C
- RDS: Nation
- Branding: Nation Radio

Programming
- Format: Pop Music
- Network: Nation Radio Network

Ownership
- Owner: Nation Broadcasting
- Operator: Nation Broadcasting

History
- First air date: 1 August 2018 (as Ipswich 102)
- Former names: Ipswich 102 (2018–2020); Greatest Hits Radio (2020–2022)

Links
- Website: Nation Radio Suffolk

Nation Radio Suffolk is an Independent Local Radio station owned and operated by Nation Broadcasting. It broadcasts from Ipswich in Suffolk.

As of September 2024, the station broadcasts to a weekly audience of 26,000, according to RAJAR.

== History ==
The licence for the area had previously been held by Town 102 but Ofcom awarded the licence to Ipswich 102. This had been the first time in its history that Ofcom had not awarded a re-advertised licence to the incumbent broadcaster. Ofcom said that it regarded the station's multiplex holdings as reason why the new operator would be able to support the station: "Ipswich FM’s commitment to broadcasting on the Suffolk DAB multiplex means it would have access to a greater number of potential listeners than the incumbent licensee, which does not, and did not indicate any plans to, broadcast on DAB." The launch of the station was led by Paul Morris, formerly a presenter on SGR-FM and until 2017 the programme director for Town 102, the station Ipswich 102 replaced.

== Closure ==
On 15 October 2020, joint shareholders Nation Broadcasting and Bauer announced that the station had agreed a brand licence to rebrand Ipswich 102 to Greatest Hits Radio East from November 2020. The station will take the local drivetime programme that is currently broadcast on the existing neighbouring network stations, with all other programming being networked from Liverpool & Manchester.

Town 102 became Hits Radio Suffolk on 3 November 2020.

== Programming and presenters ==
=== Programming ===
Nation Radio Suffolk broadcasts a mix of regional and networked programming.

=== Regional shows ===
- Weekday Breakfast with Stuart McGinley
- Weekday Drivetime with Rob Chandler

=== Local presenters ===
- Stuart McGinley
- Rob Chandler

=== Networked presenters ===
- Tim Allen
- Gary Parker
- Mark Collins
- Mark Franklin
- Tony Shepherd
- Roberto
- Neil Greenslade
- Neil Fox
- Greg Burns

== Programming ==
As Nation Radio Suffolk, local programming is broadcast from 6am to 10am and 3pm to 7pm Monday to Friday. The rest of the time it takes networked programming from Nation Radio UK, with opt-outs for news, sport, travel and weather updates. During local programming, the station plays a separate playlist to Nation Radio UK.
