= The Breeze (North Somerset) =

Coordinates: 51.344°N 2.976°W

- England
- Broadcast area: North Somerset
- Frequencies: 100.8 MHz (Porlock); 102.4 MHz (Minehead); 105.6 MHz (Yeovil); 106.6 MHz (Chard); 107.4 MHz (Bridgwater); 107.7 MHz (Weston-super-Mare)

Programming
- Format: Easy listening
- Network: The Breeze

Ownership
- Owner: Bauer

History
- First air date: 23 October 1999
- Last air date: 31 August 2020
- Former names: 107.7 WFM (1999–); Star 107.7; Star Radio (–2010); Nova Radio (2010–2013); The Breeze (2013–2020)

The Breeze (North Somerset) was an Independent Local Radio station serving North Somerset, England.

The station was folded into Greatest Hits Radio South West, as part of a rebrand, on 1 September 2020.

== History ==
The Breeze started life as 107.7 WFM with presenters Steve Carpenter, Anthony Ballard, Andy Saunders and launched on 23 October 1999. It was later rebranded by the then new owners UKRD as a way of recognition of its existing Star brand. The station was then known as Star 107.7 before changing to Star Radio in North Somerset.

In November 2009, Star Radio (North Somerset) was sold by UKRD and renamed Nova Radio on 26 September 2010. At midnight on 29 March 2013, the station was re-launched as The Breeze following a takeover by Celador Radio.

In 2019, the station & The Breeze Network was purchased by Bauer Radio and on 1 September 2020 the network was closed and replaced with Greatest Hits Radio.
