= The Breeze (South Devon) =

Radio station in Torquay

Coordinates: 50.4763°N 3.5373°W

England
- Broadcast area: South Devon; Torbay
- Frequency: 105.5FM (Beacon Hill)

Programming
- Format: Easy listening
- Network: The Breeze

Ownership
- Owner: Bauer

History
- First air date: 26 May 2006
- Last air date: 31 August 2020
- Former names: Palm FM; Palm 105.5

The Breeze (South Devon) was an Independent Local Radio station serving South Devon, England.

The station was folded into Greatest Hits Radio South West, as part of a rebrand, on 1 September 2020.

== The Breeze South Devon ==
The Breeze South Devon was the Independent Local Radio station for Torbay and South Devon, which formed a part of The Breeze network. Before this, the station was originally called Palm 105.5 until September 2015, following its acquisition the year previous.

The station now only consists of one local drive time show, hosted by the former Breeze presenter Tony Wright.

== History ==
Palm FM was set up in 1998 and was the first to run a Restricted Service Licence in the area.

In 1994, Jo Corben-Richards (aka CJ Munroe), former Senior Producer/Presenter for DevonAir Radio, applied for a Restricted Service Licence specifically for the Torbay area with the backing of local lawyer and property developer, Roger Richards and local businesswoman Julia Milton-Head. Whilst at DevonAir, CJ had tried to persuade them to maintain an opt-out radio service for the Torbay area.

Permission for an RSL was initially granted by the Radio Authority, but subsequently objected to by the owners of Exeter/Torbay licence, Gemini FM.

In 1997, CJ and Roger gained further support from local businessmen and the like to proceed with the development of a local radio service for Torbay.

=== First RSL ===
Palm FM's first Restricted Service Licence was launched by the Mayor of Torquay, Vincent McCann in December 1998. The broadcast was set up to cover the annual Torbay Carnival and Christmas celebrations; they also broadcast extensive outside broadcasts from schools and a live Midnight Mass from St. Matthias Church in Wellswood.

=== Second RSL ===
A second 28-day broadcast was made from August 1999 to coincide with the eclipse; the station was even designated the "Official Eclipse Station" by Sir Patrick Moore, who involved himself with the Palm's output.

Outside broadcasts during this period included a South West Musical Festival from the Quay West holiday Complex in Paignton.

A new logo was designed by local students and a winner was picked by the listeners.

The area's tourist industry was promoted by a locally written and Palm FM produced CD which was distributed by W.H. Smiths.

Great Britain's largest recognised talent competition "Stairway to the Stars" was sponsored by Palm FM and featured CJ as Senior Judge.

=== Third RSL ===
Palm FM returned to the airwaves in May 2000, again under the guidance of CJ. During this period, Palm FM continued to lobby for the Torbay area to be added to the Radio Authority's "working list" for proposed new services. Between the last two RSLs, Palm FM commissioned two separate in-depth independent research initiatives for the proposed permanent station, the results were forwarded to the Authority.

=== 2000 onwards ===
Station Director, Brian Houghton died, his wife continued his support and investment in the company. Julia Milton-Head left the company for health reasons, but also retained her investment. In 2002, Carlton Westcountry presenter Kate Reeves expressed her interest and later joined the Board.

After the RSLs, John Brocks was appointed as Project Director to apply for a full-time license. Dr. Avtar Lit and Palm Radio Ltd agreed to apply for the Torbay Licence, Managing Director of London Media Company, Neil Romain joined the Board of the newly formed Palm FM Limited with his colleague David Lowen, a media consultant and former head of news for ITV Westcountry. LMC now provide financial and administrative support while allowing the local Board to operate, broadcast and develop.

In September 2005, and after ten years of campaigning, Palm was awarded the licence.

=== Sale and rebranding to The Breeze ===
Celador Radio acquired Palm FM on 22 August 2014 from Palm Radio Ltd for the remaining 40% which was not owned. On 21 September 2015, Palm 105.5 was rebranded as The Breeze and became part of The Breeze Network.
