= Wessex FM =

Local Radio station in Dorset, England

Coordinates: 50.71377°N 2.43806°W

- United Kingdom
- Broadcast area: Weymouth, Dorchester, Bridport & North Dorset
- Frequency: 96.0, 97.2 MHz

Programming
- Format: Contemporary

Ownership
- Owner: Bauer Radio

History
- First air date: 3 September 1993
- Last air date: 31 August 2020

Wessex FM was an Independent Local Radio station for the Weymouth, Dorchester and Bridport areas of Dorset, originating from studios in Dorchester. It broadcast on 97.2 MHz in Weymouth and Dorchester (from the Bincombe Hill transmitter), and on 96.0 MHz in Bridport (from the Bridport transmitter).

== History ==
=== Early days ===
A group of local radio enthusiasts had been campaigning to have an Independent Local Radio (ILR) station in Dorset for some time. The Radio Authority advertised the licence early in 1992 and awarded it to ‘Regent Radio’ in early 1993.

Regent Radio comprised a group of local business people - including property investor Peter Bolton, local museum owner Michael Ridley and Tom Singh founder of New Look - together with corporate backing from Orchard Media (owners of Taunton's Orchard FM) and Radio Investments.

The founding managing director was Stephen Oates, appointed in February 1993, who had previously launched Isle of Wight Radio in 1990 and subsequently went on to launch Spirit FM in West Sussex in 1996.

Steve secured suitable premises in Trinity Street in the centre of Dorchester, and conversion and studio construction took two months during the summer of 1993. Transmission facilities were contracted to NTL, using the Bincombe transmission mast.

The station name - Wessex FM - was chosen, together with the original strap line ‘Pure Dorset Radio’ and a completely new team was recruited with Roger Kennedy as programme manager, Jane Soole as head of news and Derek Bateman as sales manager. The main on-air team initially comprised Iain Meadows on Breakfast, Roger Kennedy on mid-mornings, Maria Ferguson on afternoons, and Stuart McGinley evenings.

The station went on-air, initially only broadcasting on 97.2FM, at 10am on 4 September 1993, with several special guests including veteran presenter Tony Blackburn and Lionel Blair. As part of the on-air launch day the station undertook its first outside broadcast at the Dorchester County Show. A relay for Bridport and surrounding villages was later launched on 96.0FM to address weak reception due to the topography of West Dorset.

=== Wessex FM before its closure ===
Until its closure on 31 August 2020, it had a reach percentage of 42%.

=== Programming ===
All of Wessex FM's programming was produced and broadcast from its Dorchester studios. Presenter-led programming aired from 6am – midnight on weekdays, 6am – 6pm on Saturdays and 8am – 4pm on Sundays. All other output was automated.

== Closure ==
Wessex FM was purchased by Bauer Media in 2019 along with other stations in the UKRD Group. On 27 May 2020 it was announced that Wessex FM will become Greatest Hits Radio from early September 2020. The station went through a transitional period where its playlist was changed over to the 70s, 80s and 90s era and jingles changed to reflect the station playing "greatest hits". Wessex FM was finally rebranded to Greatest Hits Radio at 6:00am on 1 September 2020.
