= Radio Norwich 99.9 =

Coordinates: 52.628452°N 1.299005°E

Greatest Hits Radio Norfolk & North Suffolk
- Norwich; England
- Broadcast area: Central Norfolk
- Frequency: 99.9 MHz

Programming
- Format: Classic Hits
- Network: Greatest Hits Radio

Ownership
- Owner: Bauer

History
- First air date: 29 June 2006

Links
- Website: Greatest Hits Radio

Greatest Hits Radio Norfolk & North Suffolk (formerly Radio Norwich 99.9) is an Independent Local Radio station owned and operated by Bauer, broadcasting to Norwich and the surrounding area. The station was merged with North Norfolk Radio and The Beach and became Greatest Hits Radio Norfolk and North Suffolk.

== History ==
Final logo used up until rebrand.

The station was part of Tindle Radio Group, former owners of neighbouring North Norfolk Radio and 103.4 The Beach. The station was known as Crown FM during its 28-day trial RSL broadcasts.

Crown FM began broadcasting trials on 3 July 1999 using a restricted service licence on 107.3 MHz FM via a mast at Mousehold Heath.

Further RSLs took place in the 28 days leading up to Christmas in 1999, 2000 and 2001, and from 26 April to 23 May 2003.

The British communications regulator, Ofcom, advertised a permanent licence for the area on 8 December 2004. On the closing date of 9 March 2005, Crown FM was one of five bidders, with Lite FM Norwich (from Forward Media), Norwich 99.9 FM (from Wireless Group), NRG fm (from local interests, including Archant Regional) and Today FM (from UKRD Group).

Ofcom announced on 9 June 2005 that Crown FM had won the licence for 12 years.

The station began test transmissions on 31 May 2006 for four weeks from a transmitter at Stoke Holy Cross near Poringland in Norfolk, using 500 Watts ERP. It opened on 29 June 2006 under the name 99.9 Radio Norwich with the slogan The New Number For Norwich.

On 31 January 2017, it was confirmed that Celador had completed the purchase of Anglian Radio group.

== Station rebrand ==
On 8 February 2019, 99.9 Radio Norwich and Celador's local radio stations were sold to Bauer. The sale was ratified in March 2020 following an inquiry by the Competition and Markets Authority.

On 27 May 2020, it was announced that 99.9 Radio Norwich will join Bauer's Greatest Hits Radio network.

On 13 July 2020, local programming outside weekday breakfast was replaced by networked output from the GHR network, with 99.9 Radio Norwich retaining its own branding.

On 1 September 2020, the station rebranded as Greatest Hits Radio and merged with its sister stations in the East. The station's local breakfast show was replaced by a regional drivetime show, which later became an afternoon show to make way for the new flagship show Simon Mayo Drivetime. Localised news bulletins, traffic updates and advertising were retained.

== Programming ==
From 9 January 2017, all programming was shared between North Norfolk Radio, Radio Norwich 99.9 and 103.4 The Beach, although the three stations kept separate branding (particularly for local Travel, Events, News, Adverts and Commercials) with programmes broadcast from the studio in Norwich.
