= North Norfolk Radio =

- Norfolk; England
- Broadcast area: North Norfolk
- Frequencies: 103.2 MHz, 96.2 MHz

Programming
- Format: Classic Hits
- Network: Greatest Hits Radio

Ownership
- Owner: Bauer

History
- First air date: 10 November 2003
- Last air date: 31 August 2020

North Norfolk Radio was an Independent Local Radio station in North Norfolk, England, owned and operated by Bauer Radio as part of the Greatest Hits Radio network. It was closed on 1 September 2020 and merged with Greatest Hits Radio Norfolk & North Suffolk.

== History ==
North Norfolk Radio was established following campaigns by several groups for a dedicated radio service for the area. Some of these groups ran restricted service licence (RSL) trial stations, including 106.9 FTR-FM (Fakenham – August 1997), Fakenham Community Radio (April/May 1999), Wensum FM (East Dereham – 3 trials between October 1999 & June 2001), Central Norfolk Radio (Fakenham – 5 trials between April 1999 and May 2001), Escape FM (Sheringham – July/August 2000) and Tindles own 87.7 The Beach (North Walsham – Christmas 2000 & Holt, Norfolk – June 2001).

On 14 November 2002, the Radio Authority formally advertised a new local commercial radio licence for the coastal area of North Norfolk, covering Wells-next-the-Sea and Cromer, and inland to include Fakenham. Potential applicants had around 16 weeks to submit their proposals to the Radio Authority. Two applicants submitted bids by the closing date of 4 March 2003: North Norfolk Radio (Tindle Radio) and Go-FM (Absolute Radio).

On 8 May 2003, the Radio Authority announced that Tindle, trading as North Norfolk Radio, had won the eight-year licence for a local commercial radio service. Tindle were the majority shareholders in the company (79%), with local directors taking the rest, including Angela Bond, a former producer for Kenny Everett. The chairman of the new station was Ian McNicol, owner of the Stody Estate.

The original team at NNR were Sharron Tuck (Station Manager), John Bultitude (Head of News) and presenters included former 1960s offshore radio broadcasters Andy Archer and Mike Ahern.

North Norfolk Radio originally broadcast from Breck Farm, Stody, Norfolk, from a converted milking parlour. The first test transmission were broadcast on 21 October 2003, when the main transmitter at Stody was switched on, transmitting on a frequency of 96.2 MHz VHF/FM, at a power of 2580 watts. After a few more weeks, relay transmitters at Aylmerton and Bunkers Hill were switched on and relayed the test transmissions from Stody. Both of these relay transmitters were tuned to 103.2 MHz VHF/FM at a power of 250 watts.

The station officially began broadcasting at 6am on Monday, 10 November 2003, with Mike Ahern as the first presenter on the station, although the first voice heard was that of McNicol. The song that launched the station was "I Get The Sweetest Feeling" by Jackie Wilson.

Due to problems with reception in Fakenham, a 10-watt relay transmitter was built on the Holt Road water tower in the town. This began operating on 11 October 2005, transmitting on 96.2 MHz VHF/FM.

Unlike many other stations, North Norfolk Radio did not use radio links or rented landlines to get their studio output to their main transmitter, but used a 1000-metre armoured multicore cable buried underground, from the studio to transmitter building. Because the relay transmitters used common frequencies (i.e. 103.2 at 2 sites and 96.2 at the Fakenham relay), they were GPS-synchronised so as not to cause interference to each other.

The station was owned by the Anglian Radio group, who owned several stations in East Anglia, including neighbouring stations 103.4 The Beach, covering the east coast of Norfolk and Suffolk, and 99.9 Radio Norwich. As of Monday 9 January 2017, the station merged with these two sister stations, with all programming now originating from Radio Norwich's studios in Norwich. On 31 January 2017, it was confirmed that Celador had completed the purchase of Anglian Radio Group.

=== Station rebrand ===
On 8 February 2019, North Norfolk Radio and Celador's local radio stations were sold to Bauer Radio. The sale was ratified in March 2020 following an inquiry by the Competition and Markets Authority.

On 27 May 2020, it was announced that North Norfolk Radio would join Bauer's Greatest Hits Radio network. On 13 July 2020, local programming outside weekday breakfast was replaced by networked output from the GHR network, with North Norfolk Radio retaining its own branding.

In September 2020, the station was rebranded as Greatest Hits Radio and merged with its sister stations in the East. The station's local breakfast show was replaced by a regional drivetime show. Localised news bulletins, traffic updates and advertising are retained.

== Programming ==
From 9 January 2017, all programming was shared between North Norfolk Radio, Radio Norwich 99.9 and The Beach (radio station), although the three stations kept separate branding (particularly for local Travel, Events, News, Adverts and Commercials) with programmes broadcast from studios in Norwich and Ipswich.
