= Greatest Hits Radio =

UK classic hits radio network

- United Kingdom
- Broadcast area: United Kingdom
- Frequencies: FM: 96.0 MHz – 107.9 MHz; DAB: 9C – 12D
- RDS: Grt Hits
- Branding: The Good Times Sound Like This! Across TSA

Programming
- Language: English
- Format: 1970s – 1990s pop/rock

Ownership
- Owner: Bauer Media Audio UK
- Sister stations: Hits Radio; Hits Radio Pride; Hits Radio 90s Hits Radio 00s Greatest Hits Radio 60s Greatest Hits Radio 70s Greatest Hits Radio 80s

History
- First air date: 5 January 2015 as Bauer City 2; 7 January 2019 as Greatest Hits Radio
- Former frequencies: AM: 828 kHz – 1584 kHz

Links
- Webcast: Rayo
- Website: Greatest Hits Radio

Greatest Hits Radio (GHR) is a classic hits radio network in the United Kingdom, owned and operated by Bauer Media Audio UK. It currently includes 18 local and regional radio stations operating over 50 FM and DAB licences in England, Scotland and Wales, as well as a national DAB station in areas not served by a local Bauer-owned licence.

The GHR brand launched on 7 January 2019 as an "older" companion to Hits Radio, which Bauer had launched in 2018. It is a rebranding of the former Bauer City 2 Network (launched on 5 January 2015) due to the success of Radio City 2 in Liverpool on FM. All GHR stations are networked and include localised opt-outs for news, weather, travel and advertising. Until 31 October 2024, the stations aired a three-hour regional afternoon show on weekdays.

According to RAJAR data, the GHR stations have a combined weekly reach of 7.5 million people as of September 2024.

== History ==
=== Historic 'Gold' Stations ===
The stations which initially formed the Greatest Hits Radio network are predominantly sister stations to the corresponding Hits Radio network stations. Many were originally set up as a 'Gold' counterpart (e.g. Radio City Gold in Liverpool) when stations were instructed by the Independent Broadcasting Authority to cease simulcasting their services on both AM and FM in the late 1980s. The main exception to this was FM station West Sound in Dumfries and Galloway.

=== Greatest Hits Radio (Scotland) and Magic (Northern England) ===
In Northern England, the stations were rebranded as Magic in 1997 – a station brand first used by Radio Aire upon the launch of their AM station in July 1990.

In Scotland, local programming on AM stations was largely retained until networking outside of weekday breakfast and specialist shows was introduced in June 2009.

The Magic stations gradually began to form a network merging most of their schedule until, and by March 2013, only local content consisted of three regional breakfast shows on weekdays, serving the North West, the North East and Yorkshire.

In July 2013, the remaining Scottish local output ceased, leading to a fully networked schedule known as 'Greatest Hits Network.

=== Greatest Hits Radio (Scotland) and Radio City 2 (Northern England) ===
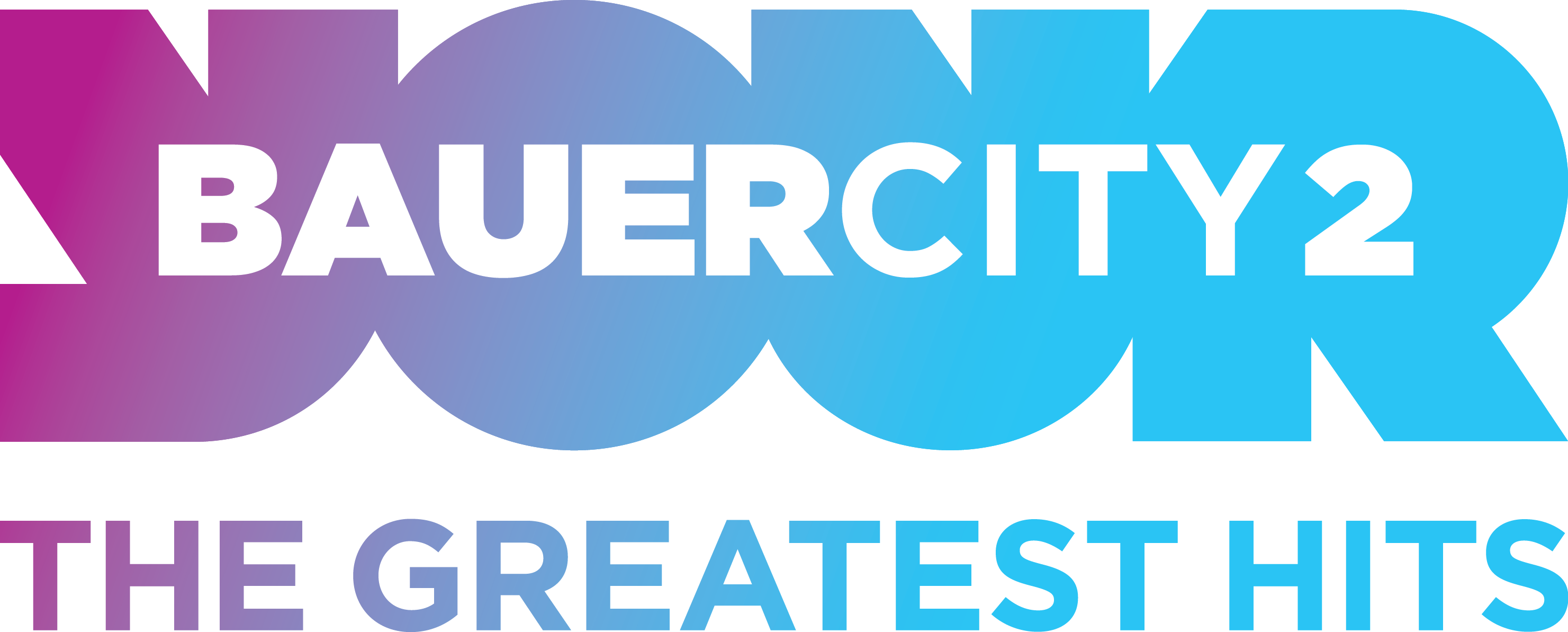
Former logo of the Bauer City 2 network of stations

In September 2014, Bauer Radio announced it would rebrand the Magic stations under localised identities, based on the main FM station names (e.g. Magic 1152 in Manchester becomes Key 2, based on Key 103). Magic's AM network closed with the London equivalent, Magic 105.4 FM, launched nationwide on DAB.

The relaunch took place on Monday 5 January 2015. Initially, the two networks serving Scotland (The Greatest Hits Network) and northern England (City 2 Network) were replaced by one carrying programming from both nations over all stations, with some peak time opt-outs. Further split programming for the two nations was reintroduced the following year.

On 7 December 2015, Radio City 2 in Liverpool swapped frequencies with sister station Radio City Talk on 105.9 FM and reintroduced local programming at peak times.

In April 2018, Northsound 2 ceased analogue broadcasting on 1035 AM, becoming the first commercial radio station in Scotland – and the first local Bauer-owned station – to broadcast only on digital platforms (DAB and online).

On 4 June 2018, Key 2 in Manchester was rebranded as Key Radio, in tandem with Key 103's relaunch as Hits Radio.

=== Greatest Hits Radio (National) ===
On 7 January 2019, Greatest Hits Radio replaced the Bauer City 2 branding due to the success of Radio City 2 in Liverpool. Local station identities in Northern England took on Greatest Hits Radio branded names and Scottish stations retaining their local brands.

Greatest Hits Radio also became available on FM in the West Midlands taking over the 105.2 FM frequency from Absolute Radio. Greatest Hits Radio also took over Absolute Radio's London FM frequency (105.8) on 17 May 2021.

The network expanded with Greatest Hits Radio UK broadcasting across most of the local DAB multiplexes across the UK.

The service took the Liverpool FM programming with national news bulletins and traffic reports.

=== Network expansion ===
In May 2020, Bauer announced that 48 local radio stations in England and South West Wales would rebrand and join the Greatest Hits Radio network, following the acquisition of licences from UKRD, Wireless Group, Lincs FM Group and Celador.

Most of the stations were merged and began carrying networked output, alongside a regional show on weekdays and localised news, travel and advertising.

On 13 July 2020, the former Wireless Group and Celador-owned stations joined the Greatest Hits Radio network. The nineteen stations carried local breakfast shows and voicetracked programming whilst retaining separate branding until the full relaunch on 1 September 2020.

On 1 September, Bauer closed down Leeds-based Radio Aire so that it could switch the frequency from the Hits Radio network to Greatest Hits Radio as part of the merging with twelve stations in Yorkshire and Lincolnshire.

On 17 September 2020, Bauer bought Radio Plymouth.

On 15 October 2020, it was announced that the Suffolk station Ipswich 102, part-owned by Bauer through their purchase of Lincs FM Group, would take the GHR brand and network programming, including the East region drivetime show, from November, with the former Town 102 on DAB, which had carried GHR East since the September network relaunch, being replaced by Hits Radio.

On 22 October 2020, it was reported the Oldham and Rochdale station Revolution 96.2 had been sold to Bauer for conversion into GHR, joining the Manchester AM and Bolton/Bury FM licenses in the GHR North West network.

In March 2021, Ofcom approved Bauer's application for permission to alter the FM licence held by the London FM relay of Absolute Radio, enabling the frequency to be used to provide a London variant of GHR. with Absolute Radio continuing to be available by way of its national AM and digital transmissions. The change took place on 17 May.

On 17 June 2021 Bauer announced the purchase of Imagine Radio from the Like Media Group, with the existing Imagine service slated to be replaced by separate GHR feeds for Stockport and North Cheshire and the Peak District and Derbyshire Dales.

On 19 September 2022, Wave 105's Poole transmitter began carrying Greatest Hits Radio Dorset.

On 22 November 2022, Bauer announced that CFM in Cumbria & South West Scotland will rebrand to Greatest Hits Radio from 3 April 2023.

On 14 December 2022, Greatest Hits Radio launched on Sky, replacing Scala Radio on the platform.

On 12 January 2023, Bauer announced that the seven heritage names in Scotland (Clyde 2, Forth 2, MFR 2, Tay 2 and Westsound (Ayrshire) and (Dumfries and Galloway), would rebrand as Greatest Hits Radio from 3 April.

On 31 January 2023, Bauer announced that Radio Borders was to rebrand as Greatest Hits Radio from 3 April, following the news earlier in the month which will see the seven Scottish heritage names also rebranding on the same day.

On 1 March 2023, Bauer announced that Lincs FM would lose its FM frequency and go DAB only from 3 April. The FM frequency would become Greatest Hits Radio.

On the same day, Bauer also announced that three of the four FM frequencies held by Kiss in Cambridge (105.6), Ipswich and Colchester (106.4) and Peterborough (107.7), would switch to carrying Greatest Hits Radio and join the GHR East network. The 106.1 frequency in Norwich would continue to carry Kiss.

On 4 September 2023, localised versions of GHR launched in Kent and Northern Ireland. Both previously had the national version of the station on DAB.

On 12 November 2023, it was announced that GHR's remaining medium wave transmissions, in Scotland and northern England, would cease by the end of the year, but the station would continue on DAB in the affected areas.

On 13 December 2023, Bauer pulled its stations from satellite and cable television.

On 28 March 2024, Bauer closed down Hampshire based Wave 105 and it re-branded into the Greatest Hits Radio network as Greatest Hits Radio South Coast.

On 9 September 2024, it was announced that a sister station named "Greatest Hits Radio 60s" begin broadcasting on 16 September 2024.

A new national weekday afternoon show airs from 11 November 2024, resulting in the axe of many regionalised shows in England.

The national breakfast show extended to the South of England from 23 December 2024, meaning all England stations are now fully networked.

On 10 March 2025, it was announced that sister stations named "Greatest Hits Radio 70s and Greatest Hits Radio 80s" would launch across the UK on DAB+. They began broadcasting on 31 March 2025.

In June 2025, Bauer Media Audio Ireland soft launched a version of Greatest Hits Radio aimed at listeners in the Republic of Ireland, as part of one-year trial licenses of DAB+ services in the country. Whilst it maintains a similar branding and playlist as the UK network, the Irish station does not syndicate any of the networked programming from the UK station, instead utilising automated music programming with Ireland-based presentation. On 22 June 2025, Choice Broadcasting Ltd. obtained a temporary injunction prohibiting Bauer from using the name "Greatest Hits Radio" in the Republic of Ireland, as it was too similar to its own competing Ireland's Classic Hits Radio network. Choice argued that it had already warned Bauer against using the name in correspondence prior to the launch, and also cited summaries generated by artificial intelligence (AI) on Google Search which falsely stated that Bauer's GHR was replacing Choice's Classic Hits Radio. To comply with the order, the station ceased using the full "Greatest Hits Radio" name on-air, with all station identification now referring to it exclusively as "GHR".

On 28 July 2025, the Greatest Hits at Breakfast show presented by Simon "Rossie" Ross began broadcasting nationwide, which included the show being rolled out to Scotland, making Greatest Hits Radio a fully networked station, however local and regional news bulletins, weather, traffic and travel reports and adverts have been retained.

== Stations ==
* Available on DAB and online only

◇ Available online only

GHR station	Region/Nation	Former name or predecessor
Greatest Hits Radio (national)◇	-	
Ayrshire*	Scotland	West Sound
Berkshire & North Hampshire	South	The Breeze (Basingstoke & North Hampshire)
Birmingham & The West Midlands	West Midlands	Free Radio 80s
Black Country & Shropshire	West Midlands	Signal 107
Bristol & The South West	South West	The Breeze (Bristol)
Bucks, Beds & Herts	South	Mix 96
Cambridge	East	Kiss 105-108 (FM frequency replacement)
Cornwall	South West	Pirate FM (FM frequency replacement)
Coventry & Warwickshire*	West Midlands	Free Radio 80s C&W
Cumbria & South West Scotland (formerly Cumbria)	North West/Scotland	CFM
Devon	South West	The Breeze (South Devon)
Dorset	South	Wessex FM
Dumfries and Galloway	Scotland	West Sound
East Midlands	East Midlands	Gem 106 (FM frequency replacement)
East Yorkshire & Northern Lincolnshire*	Yorkshire and the Humber	Viking 2
Edinburgh, Lothians, Fife and Falkirk*	Scotland	Forth 2
Essex	East	Dream 100
Glasgow and the West*	Scotland	Clyde 2
Gloucestershire	South West	The Breeze (Cheltenham & North Gloucestershire)
Grimsby	Yorkshire and the Humber	Compass FM
Harrogate and the Yorkshire Dales	Yorkshire and the Humber	Stray FM
Hereford & Worcester	West Midlands	Signal 107 (Kidderminster) & Free Radio 80s H&W
Ipswich & Suffolk	East	Town 102, Kiss 105-108 (FM frequency replacement)
Lancashire	North West	Rock FM 2, Radio Wave 96.5
Lincolnshire	East Midlands	Lincs FM (FM frequency replacement)
Liverpool & The North West	North West	Radio City 2, Wire FM
London	London	Absolute Radio (FM frequency replacement)
Manchester & The North West	North West	Key Radio, Tower FM, Revolution 96.2, Wish FM
Norfolk & North Suffolk	East	The Beach, Radio Norwich 99.9, North Norfolk Radio
North Derbyshire	East Midlands	Peak FM (North Derbyshire)
North East Scotland*	Scotland	Northsound 2
North East*	North East	Metro 2
Northamptonshire*	East Midlands	
Northern Ireland	Northern Ireland	
Oxfordshire	South	Jack FM
Stamford & Rutland	East Midlands	Rutland Radio
Plymouth	South West	Radio Plymouth
Salisbury	South	Spire FM
Somerset	South West	The Breeze (North Somerset)
South Coast	South	Wave 105
South Wales*	Wales	Swansea Sound
South Yorkshire	Yorkshire and the Humber	Hallam 2, Dearne FM, Rother FM, Trax FM
Staffordshire & Cheshire	West Midlands/North West	Signal 2
Surrey & East Hampshire	South	Eagle Radio
Sussex	South	Spirit FM
Swindon	South West	Sam FM
Tayside and Fife*	Scotland	Tay 2
Teesside*	North East	TFM 2
The North of Scotland*	Scotland	MFR 2
The Scottish Borders & North Northumberland	Scotland/North East	Radio Borders
West Norfolk	East	KL.FM 96.7
West Yorkshire (formerly Leeds & West Yorkshire)	Yorkshire and the Humber	Radio Aire, Radio Aire 2, Ridings FM, Pulse 2
Wiltshire (formerly Bath & the South West)	South West	The Breeze (Frome & West Wiltshire), The Breeze (Bath)
York and North Yorkshire	Yorkshire and the Humber	Minster FM
Yorkshire Coast	Yorkshire and the Humber	Yorkshire Coast Radio

== Programming ==
All programming is produced and broadcast from Bauer's London headquarters or studios in Birmingham, Edinburgh, Glasgow and Manchester.

=== News ===
Bauer's newsrooms across the UK air mixed local and national news bulletins hourly from 6am to 7pm on weekdays and from 7am to 1pm on Saturdays and Sundays.

Headlines are broadcast on the half-hour during weekday breakfast and drivetime shows, alongside traffic bulletins.

At weekends, bespoke networked news bulletins air during the afternoon produced by the Bauer newsroom in Glasgow for Scotland and usually either Leeds or Manchester for England and Wales. At all other times, mainly evening and overnight, hourly national bulletins originate from Sky News Radio.

== Notable presenters ==
- Richard Allinson
- Zoe Ball
- Jackie Brambles
- Ken Bruce
- Andy Crane
- Paul Gambaccini (Greatest Hits Radio 60s)
- Alex Lester
- Simon Mayo
- Des Paul
- Jenny Powell
- Kate Thornton
- Simon 'Rossie' Ross
- Claire Sturgess
- Lynn Parsons (Greatest Hits Radio 70s)
- Stephanie Hirst
- Jo Russell (Greatest Hits Radio 80s)
- Matt Williams (drivetime sport reporter)

=== Past presenters ===
- Janice Long (died in 2021)
- Pat Sharp
- Mark Goodier
- Martin Kemp

== Spin-off stations ==
On 9 September 2024, it was announced that the first GHR spin-off station would launch. It would be a decades station, Greatest Hits Radio 60s, which began broadcasting on 16 September 2024. On 31 March 2025, GHR launched two new decades stations called Greatest Hits Radio 70s and Greatest Hits Radio 80s.
