= Dream 100 FM =

Dream 100

Colchester; England
- Broadcast area: Tendring
- Frequency: 100.2 MHz

Programming
- Format: Classic hits

Ownership
- Owner: Bauer

History
- First air date: 7 October 1990
- Last air date: 31 August 2020
- Former names: Mellow 1557 (1990–1998)
- Former frequencies: 1557 kHz AM (1990–1998)

Technical information
- ERP: 1 kW
- Transmitter coordinates: 51.8232°N 1.1773°E

Links
- Website: dream100.com

Dream 100 was an Independent Local Radio station owned and operated by Bauer. It broadcast to Tendring and Essex from studios in Colchester and Ipswich, airing the same music programming as sister station Town 102.

The station was folded into Greatest Hits Radio East, as part of a rebrand and merger, on 1 September 2020.

== History ==
The station was founded as medium wave outlet Mellow 1557 on 1557 kHz in 1990. The station launched on 7 October 1990 as an easy listening station for Tendring. In 1992 Southern Radio PLC acquired Mellow, as part of a reverse takeover by the Invicta Radio Group, making it part of the same company that owned Invicta FM, Ocean FM, Southern FM, Invicta Supergold and South Coast Radio.

In 1996, Southern Radio sold Mellow on to Radio First, who went on to sell the station to Tindle Radio Ltd on 1 September 1998; on 19 November, it became an FM station and adopted its later name. Despite this name change, the holding company of the radio station was still known as Mellow 1557 Limited, just as it was until it was dissolved in August 2021.

Former pirate radio DJ Bill Rollins had been at the Tendring station through its various evolutions, from day 1 in 1990.

In 2006, Town 102 was started up as a sister to Dream 100 from Ipswich, focused on south Suffolk. Programmes between 0600 and 1900 Monday to Friday and between 0800 and 1200 on Saturday and Sunday were then produced in the Town 102 studios near Ipswich for broadcast on Dream 100. Programmes outside these times were shared with all Anglian Radio stations. From 27 February 2017, all programming was shared with Town 102, using the same playout and announcers but with station-unique idents.

Originally broadcasting on 100.2 MHz from a transmitter site at Telstar Nurseries at Cook's Green near Little Clacton in Tendring, Dream moved to the new Clacton Freeview transmitter site in 2011.

== Sale to Bauer and GHR merger ==
On 8 February 2019, Dream 100 and Celador's local radio stations were sold to Bauer. The sale was ratified in March 2020 following an inquiry by the Competition and Markets Authority.

On 27 May 2020, it was announced that Dream 100 would join Bauer's Greatest Hits Radio network.

On 13 July 2020, local programming outside weekday breakfast was replaced by networked output from the GHR network, with Dream 100 retaining its own branding.

In September 2020, the station rebranded as Greatest Hits Radio East and merged with several other local stations. The station's local breakfast show was replaced by a regional drivetime show. Localised news bulletins, traffic updates and advertising were retained. The Town 102 and Dream 100 studio in Ipswich closed.
