= Catenae Innovation =

British digital media and technology company

Catenae Innovation plc
- Type: Public Limited Company
- Traded as: AIM:CTEA
- Industry: Digital Media; Technology
- Predecessors: Milestone Pictures Limited; Milestone Group Holdings Limited; MGH Investments Limited; Milestone Group
- Founded: 6 March 2003
- Headquarters: London, United Kingdom
- Products: The Passion Project; Winning in the Game of Life; OnGuard; OnSide
- Subsidiaries: Relative; Mobile Business Solutions; Nexstar; Disorder Magazine
- Website: catenaeinnovation.com

Catenae Innovation (formerly Milestone Group) is a British digital media and technology company. Originally a cross media proprietor with holdings in radio, publishing and television, the company progressed into the digital media and technology sector.

The company is based in London and is a constituent of the FTSE AIM All-Share Index division of the Alternative Investment Market.

== History ==
In 2009, Milestone entered into an agreement with privately owned American Technology firm, JumpStart Wireless Corporation, obtaining the rights to sell patented and patent pending technologies of Jumpstart in the UK.

In 2011, Milestone acquired Oil Productions Ltd and was awarded a contract to deliver a digital art competition for Infiniti.

In 2013, Milestone launched the Passion Project, with the aim to inspire and empower young people and tackle youth unemployment.

In 2014, Milestone's subsidiary Oil Productions was awarded a contract to deliver the construction of a microsite for the Animals Asia Foundation.

In 2015, Milestone formed a joint venture company, Nexstar, with Black Cactus Holdings Pty Ltd.

== Former holdings ==
=== Television channels ===
The Milestone Group had one television channel Six TV (originally The Oxford Channel, it operated through Oxford Broadcasting) and was a "free-to-air" channel available in Oxford and Southampton. It ceased broadcast in 2009.

=== Newspapers and magazines ===
Basingstoke Observer was sold in a management buyout in September 2006. Following several changes in ownership, it now operates under the ownership of Taylor Newspapers. In June 2015, the Observer brand was extended to publications in Newbury & Thatcham.

On 28 November 2019, Taylor Newspapers ceased operations.
