= 2010 in British radio =

This is a list of events in British radio during 2010.

== Events ==
=== January ===
- 7 January – Jonathan Ross announces he will leave the BBC when his contract expires in July.
- 11 January –
  - Chris Evans takes over as presenter of the Radio 2 breakfast show. The programme's launch also sees the return of newsreader Moira Stuart to the BBC after two years. Simon Mayo takes over the drivetime show.
  - Gaby Roslin takes over as host of the breakfast show alongside Paul Ross on BBC London 94.9.
- 13 January – The BBC admits that it gave undue prominence to the band U2 in February 2009 after it repeatedly broadcast a “U2 = BBC” graphic and allowed presenters to claim the corporation was “part of launching” the group's latest album.
- 15 January – N-Dubz singer Dappy and the BBC are forced to apologise after the rapper sent abusive text messages, which included death threats, to a woman who complained about him during an appearance on Radio 1's Chris Moyles Show on 12 January.
- 17 January – Lynn Parsons returns to Radio 2 as a regular presenter with an early Sunday morning breakfast show. The show airs until April when the Radio 2 schedule is overhauled.

=== February ===
- 12 February – Carrie Prideaux leaves BBC Radio 1 after hosting her last Newsbeat sports bulletins for The Chris Moyles Show.
- 14 February – Sir Terry Wogan begins his weekly Sunday morning show on Radio 2. Weekend Wogan is hosted in front of a live audience in the Radio Theatre at Broadcasting House with an initial run of three months.
- 17 February – It is announced that the newspaper review show What the Papers Say, which was on television for many years, will be revived on BBC Radio 4, airing for 12 episodes in the run up to the 2010 general election and then returning on a permanent basis if it proves to be popular.
- 18 February – Talksport obtains more Premier League football in the latest radio bidding wars. Whilst relinquishing their 15:00 package to football newcomers Absolute Radio, they win two packages from BBC Radio 5 Live and will take over the national radio rights to broadcast the late kick-off every Saturday evening from the Premier League (usually kicking off at 17:30), and the early Sunday games (before 15:00). This agreement covers the 2010–11 to 2012–13 Premier League seasons
- 27 February – The six stations in the Smooth Radio network stage a "Starlight Supper", en event aimed at raising money for a number of charities: Breast Cancer Care in London, Macmillan Cancer Support in the Northwest, North East and West Midlands, the Rainbows Hospice for Children and Young People in the East Midlands and Marie Curie's Big Build in Glasgow.

=== March ===
- 2 March – BBC Director General Mark Thompson confirms plans to close BBC 6 Music and the BBC Asian Network as part of a cost-cutting drive. The proposals will also see BBC Radio 7 rebranded as BBC Radio 4 Extra and cutbacks to the BBC website.
- 10 March – The Official Chart Update is launched to give a midweek insight into the Official Singles Chart is shaping up. and is broadcast as a 30 minute mid-afternoon programme on Wednesdays.
- 11 March – BBC Radio 2 confirms plans to overhaul its schedule from April. This will include moving two of its longest-running shows, Big Band Special and The Organist Entertains to different timeslots, and switching its comedy hour from Thursday to Saturday evenings – the second time it has done this in 12 months.
- 24 March – The five radio stations owned by YMC Ltd (3TR FM, Bath FM, Brunel FM, Quay West 102.4/100.8 and Quay West 107.4) are closed by administrators after multiple refusals on the part of regulator Ofcom to transfer the licenses, following a number of financial issues at the stations after TLRC's sale.
- 26 March – Les Ross presents his final breakfast show for Birmingham's Big City Radio.

=== April ===
- 4 April – The timeslot for Bob Harris's Saturday evening/Sunday morning show on Radio 2 is moved forward an hour, meaning it airs from 12 am until 3 am instead of 11 pm – 2 am.
- 5 April – Huddersfield station Pennine FM closes down at 6pm, having been on air in various guises since 1998 and the licence is handed back to Ofcom.
- 15 April – Under new guidelines from Ofcom, from May commercial radio rivals will be allowed to co-locate to cut costs, and to slash local programming. The guidelines are a result of the recently passed Digital Economy Act.
- 19 April – Amanda Bowman becomes presenter of a late night show syndicated across BBC Local Radio in the Midlands.
- 30 April –
  - It is reported that Emma Forbes has quit as co-host of BBC Radio 2's Saturday night show Going Out with Alan Carr.
  - It is reported that Smooth and Real Radio have become the official broadcasters of the switch-on ceremony for the Blackpool Illuminations, after securing the broadcast rights from BBC Radio 2 which had aired it since 1997.

=== May ===
- 12 May – Jeremy Hunt is appointed as Culture Secretary by new Prime Minister David Cameron.
- 13 May – The BBC confirms that comedian Graham Norton will take over Jonathan Ross's show on Radio 2 when Ross leaves the network later in the year.
- 18 May – The BBC apologises after BBC Radio WM presenter Danny Kelly joked on air the previous afternoon that The Queen had died.
- 31 May – BBC Radio 1 teams up with forces broadcaster BFBS for a ten-hour takeover show from Camp Bastion.

=== June ===
- 21 June – Global Radio announces plans to reduce the number of its local Heart stations from 33 to 15 so-called "super stations" in a reorganisation that will lead to the loss of up to 200 full-time and freelance posts. The stations will have their own breakfast and drivetime shows, and local news bulletins, but all other output will come from London. A further two stations owned by Global will also be subsumed into the Heart network.
- 25 June – BBC Radio 1 is criticised by the commercial radio trade body RadioCentre following a Harry Potter Day in which the station gave what RadioCentre calls “undue prominence” to the release of the film Harry Potter and the Half-Blood Prince.
- 29 June – Smooth Radio announces plans to merge its five stations based in England, creating a national network. The new station will be based in Manchester and will see the loss of 60 jobs at Smooth's other bases. A phased launch will begin on 4 October.
- 30 June – Heart Solent replaces Heart Hampshire and Heart Dorset & New Forest.

=== July ===
- 2 July –
  - Heart Cambridgeshire replaces Heart Peterborough and Heart Cambridge.
  - Heart North Wales and West replaces Heart North Wales Coast, Heart Cheshire and North East Wales and Heart Wirral.
- 5 July – The BBC Trust rejects BBC plans to close the digital station 6 Music saying there is not a strong enough case for closure. However, plans to axe the Asian Network, reduce the BBC online services by 25% and close the teenage service Blast! are given the go-ahead.
- 9 July – Heart Thames Valley replaces Heart Oxfordshire and Heart Berkshire.
- 15 July – Senior BBC World Service executive Gwyneth Williams is appointed the next Controller of BBC Radio 4. She will succeed Mark Damazer in the autumn.
- 16 July –
  - Heart Four Counties replaces Heart Northants, Heart Milton Keynes, Heart Dunstable and Heart Bedford || Dunstable, later Milton Keynes.
  - Heart West Country replaces Heart Bristol, Heart Bath and Heart Somerset.
- 18 July – After 64 years of Woman's Hour, the BBC begins broadcasting a full series called Men's Hour on BBC Radio 5 Live, presented by Tim Samuels.
- 26 July –
  - Hertfordshire station Mercury 96.6 becomes part of the Heart network and is relaunched as Heart Hertfordshire.
  - Heart Essex replaces Heart Essex (Chelmsford & Southend), Heart Colchester and Ten 17.
  - Heart Sussex and Surrey replaces Heart Sussex and Mercury FM.
- 30 July – At midday, Quay Radio stops broadcasting after owners Portsmouth F.C. went into administration. The station is sold to Celador Radio Broadcasting, who replaces Quay Radio with Breeze 107.

=== August ===
- 15 August – Frank Wappat presents his last show for BBC Radio Newcastle after 40 years at the station A programme celebrating Frank's career is broadcast the following Sunday.
- 17 August – It is announced that Simon Bates will leave Classic FM after 13 years to join Smooth Radio as its new national breakfast presenter from January 2011.
- 20 August – BBC Hereford & Worcester announces that former TV-am weather girl Wincey Willis will join the station to present a Saturday morning show titled The Big Day Out that will give listeners ideas for days out in the Herefordshire and Worcestershire area.
- 27 August – Heart Devon replaces Heart Exeter and Heart Torbay, Heart Plymouth, Heart North Devon and Heart South Devon.

=== September ===
- 3 September –
  - BBC Radio 2 announces that Dawn Patrol presenter Sarah Kennedy is leaving the network after 17 years. By this time she has been absent from the show for several weeks, and will not return to the programme before the schedules are reorganised in October. Lynn Parsons acts as the show's stand-in presenter for its remaining time on air.
  - Heart East Anglia replaces Heart Norwich and Heart Ipswich.
- 13 September – Global announce plans to scrap the Galaxy Network in order to create a nationwide Capital FM. The plans will also include the closure of four further stations, with the new network going live in early 2011.

=== October ===
- 2 October – Comedian Graham Norton takes over the Saturday morning show on Radio 2 (10 am – 1 pm) formerly hosted by Jonathan Ross.
- 4 October – Smooth Radio launches its new national station.
- 31 October – Tony Blackburn presents his final Weekend Breakfast Show for Smooth Radio.

=== November ===
- 5 November – Members of the National Union of Journalists at the BBC begin a 48-hour strike in a dispute over proposed changes to the corporation's pension scheme. Programmes affected include the Today programme on Radio 4.
- 6 November – Tony Blackburn joins Radio 2 replacing Dale Winton as the regular host of Pick of the Pops.
- 23 November – It is announced that Vanessa Feltz will join Radio 2 from 17 January 2011, taking over Sarah Kennedy's old early morning show.

=== December ===
- 6 December – While presenting the Radio 4 Today programme, James Naughtie makes a slip of the tongue while referring to the British Culture Secretary Jeremy Hunt that turns his surname into what the BBC later describes as "an offensive four-letter word". A little later in the day Andrew Marr uses the same word on Start the Week while talking about the incident and after declaring "we won't repeat the mistake".
- 11 December – It is reported that David "Kid" Jensen is leaving his mid morning show at Gold to join Smooth Radio as an afternoon presenter. He will make his debut on the network in 2011.
- 24 December – A Christmas message by Pope Benedict XVI is broadcast by BBC Radio 4's Thought for the Day programme, the first time the Pontiff has addressed a Christmas message to one of the countries he has visited during the year.

== Station debuts ==
- 28 February – Radio Plymouth
- 5 April – Academy FM (Thanet)
- 15 August – Sanjhi Awaz Radio (2010–2012)
- May – Rossendale Radio
- 21 June – Absolute Radio 90s
- 16 July – Absolute Radio Extra
- July – InverRadio
- 4 October – Smooth Radio (national)
- 4 December – Absolute 80s
- 10 December – Absolute Radio 00s

== Programme debuts ==
- 11 January –
  - The Chris Evans Breakfast Show on BBC Radio 2 (2010–2018)
  - Simon Mayo Drivetime on BBC Radio 2 (2010–2018)
- 18 January – A History of the World in 100 Objects on BBC Radio 4 (2010)
- 14 February – Weekend Wogan on BBC Radio 2 (2010–2015)
- 2 April – Meet David Sedaris on BBC Radio 4 (2010–present)
- 2 October – Graham Norton on BBC Radio 2 (2010–2020)

== Continuing radio programmes ==
=== 1940s ===
- Sunday Half Hour (1940–2018)
- Desert Island Discs (1942–Present)
- Woman's Hour (1946–Present)
- A Book at Bedtime (1949–Present)

=== 1950s ===
- The Archers (1950–Present)
- The Today Programme (1957–Present)

=== 1960s ===
- Farming Today (1960–Present)
- In Touch (1961–Present)
- The World at One (1965–Present)
- The Official Chart (1967–Present)
- Just a Minute (1967–Present)
- The Living World (1968–Present)
- The Organist Entertains (1969–2018)

=== 1970s ===
- PM (1970–Present)
- Start the Week (1970–Present)
- You and Yours (1970–Present)
- I'm Sorry I Haven't a Clue (1972–Present)
- Good Morning Scotland (1973–Present)
- Newsbeat (1973–Present)
- File on 4 (1977–Present)
- Money Box (1977–Present)
- The News Quiz (1977–Present)
- Feedback (1979–Present)
- The Food Programme (1979–Present)
- Science in Action (1979–Present)

=== 1980s ===
- Steve Wright in the Afternoon (1981–1993, 1999–2022)
- In Business (1983–Present)
- Sounds of the 60s (1983–Present)
- Loose Ends (1986–Present)

=== 1990s ===
- The Moral Maze (1990–Present)
- Essential Selection (1991–Present)
- Essential Mix (1993–Present)
- Up All Night (1994–Present)
- Wake Up to Money (1994–Present)
- Private Passions (1995–Present)
- The David Jacobs Collection (1996–2013)
- Sunday Night at 10 (1998–2013)
- In Our Time (1998–Present)
- Material World (1998–Present)
- Scott Mills (1998–2022)
- The Now Show (1998–Present)

=== 2000s ===
- BBC Radio 2 Folk Awards (2000–Present)
- Big John @ Breakfast (2000–Present)
- Sounds of the 70s (2000–2008, 2009–Present)
- Kermode and Mayo's Film Review (2001–2022)
- The Big Toe Radio Show (2002–2011)
- A Kist o Wurds (2002–Present)
- Fighting Talk (2003–Present)
- Jeremy Vine (2003–Present)
- The Chris Moyles Show (2004–2012)
- Fearne Cotton (2009–2015)
- Annie Mac (2004–2021)
- The Jo Whiley Show (2001–2011)
- Elaine Paige on Sunday (2004–Present)
- The Bottom Line (2006–Present)
- The Christian O'Connell Breakfast Show (2006–Present)
- The Unbelievable Truth (2006–Present)
- The Radcliffe and Maconie Show (2007–Present)
- Geoff Lloyd's Hometime Show (2008–2017)
- The Strand (2008–2013)
- The Media Show (2008–Present)
- Americana (2009–2011)
- Newsjack (2009–Present)
- Paul O'Grady on the Wireless (2009–2022)
- Alan and Mel's Summer Escape (2009–2020)

== Ending this year ==
- 23 February – Act Your Age (2008–2010)
- 17 July – Jonathan Ross (1999–2010)
- Unknown – Electric Ink (2009–2010)

== Closing this year ==
Date	Station	Debut
24 March	3TR FM	2001
24 March	Bath FM	1999
24 March	Brunel FM	2006
24 March	Quay West 102.4/100.8	1998
24 March	Quay West 107.4	2001
5 April	Pennine FM	1998
6 April	Sunshine 1530	2007
29 April	L107	2005
November	Radio Maldwyn	1993
31 December	Heart 106	2005

== Deaths ==
- 2 March – Judith Bumpus, 70, radio arts producer
- 17 March – Charlie Gillett, 68, writer, broadcaster and musicologist
