= The Breeze (Bath) =

Coordinates: 51°22′50″N 2°21′37″W

- England
- Broadcast area: Bath; North East Somerset; West Wiltshire
- Frequencies: FM: 107.5 MHz (Warminster); 107.9 MHz (Bath)

Programming
- Format: Easy listening
- Network: The Breeze

Ownership
- Owner: Bauer

History
- First air date: 15 November 1999
- Last air date: 31 August 2020
- Former names: Bath FM; Total Star; More Radio; The Breeze

The Breeze (Bath) was an Independent Local Radio station serving Bath, Somerset.

The station was folded into Greatest Hits Radio South West, as part of a rebrand, on 1 September 2020.

== History ==
=== Ownerships ===
The Breeze, originally known as Bath FM and initially an independent station, was launched in November 1999 as an alternative to GWR FM Bath (now Heart West), which also serves the city. In February 2006 Bath FM was taken over by The Local Radio Company (TLRC). In June 2008 TLRC sold Bath FM, along with nearby stations Brunel FM and 3TR FM, to Laser Broadcasting. On 28 October 2008, Laser Broadcasting were placed into administration.

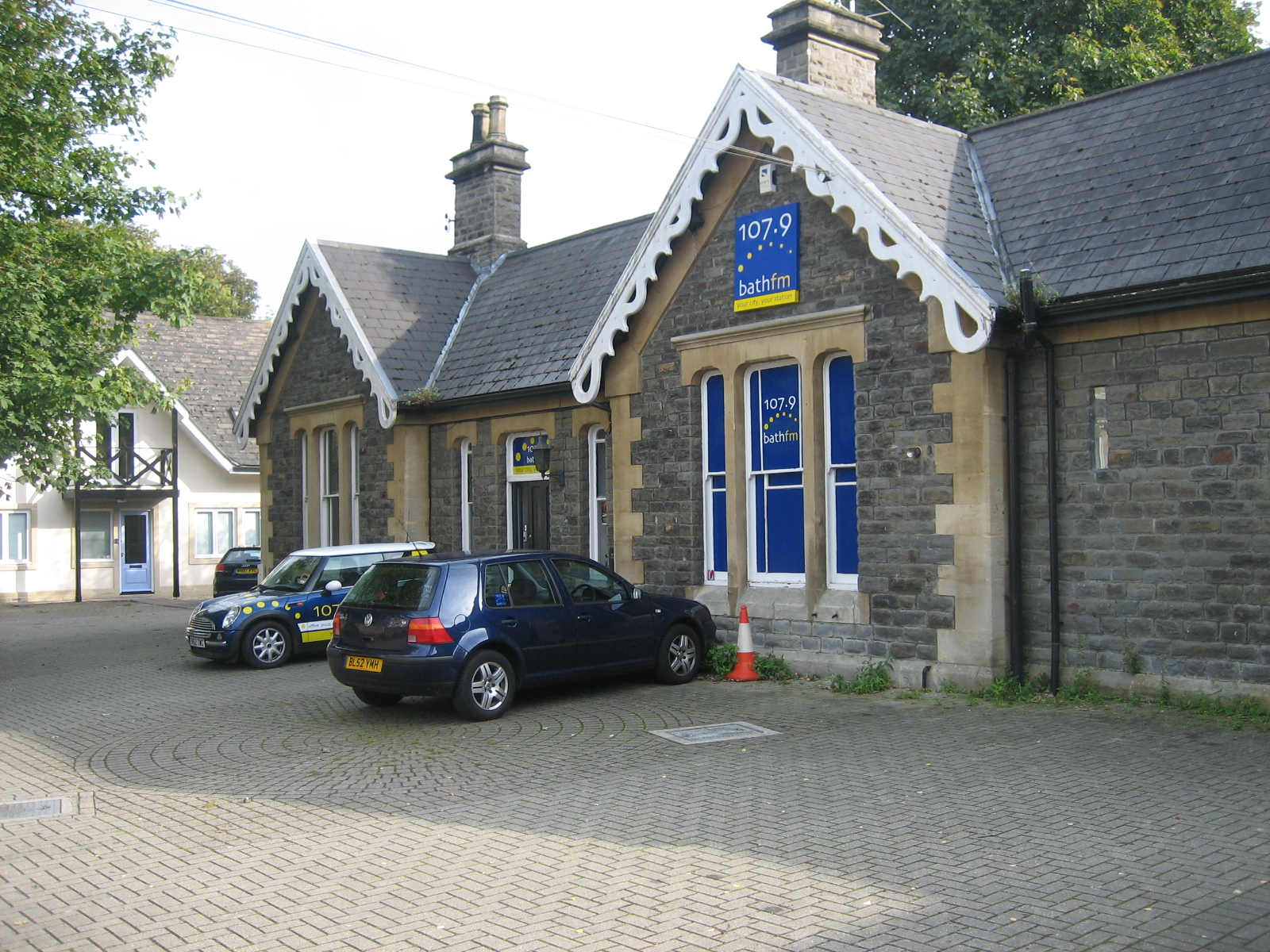
Former Bath FM offices

On 29 October 2008, it was announced that Bath FM had been sold to South West Radio Ltd. Bath FM was sold alongside Brunel FM, 3TR FM, and two Quaywest stations, following the collapse of previous owner Laser Broadcasting.

South West Radio LTD went into administration on 4 August 2009. The assets and contracts were acquired without liability by YMC ltd who ran the stations as a group, with "networked" programming at weekends.

On 24 March 2010, the five stations were closed by administrators after multiple refusals on the part of regulator OFCOM to transfer the licenses, following a number of financial issues at the stations following TLRC's sale. One Gold Radio Ltd entered into an agreement with Total Star in Gloucestershire, owned by Storm Radio ltd and in August 2010, all 5 stations were relaunched as Total Star.

Because there was no local programming on the networked shows and not enough local news on the breakfast and drivetime shows, Total Star Bath along with its sister stations in Warminster and Swindon (who were the owners of One Gold Radio Ltd) decided to break ties with sister station Total Star Gloucestershire from June 2011, which was under the ownership of Storm Radio Ltd. All Total Star stations in Wiltshire and Bath were re-branded as More Radio.

=== Re-brand ===
Following the re-advertisement of the local Bath licence by Ofcom in 2011, it was announced on 24 May 2011 that the licence has been awarded to Celador, who successfully had negotiated a deal to take over the final months of the Total Star Bath licence ahead of the "new" licence, and was relaunched as The Breeze 107.9 on 25 September 2011, the operator of Bristol-based The Breeze 107.2. The three Breeze frequencies on the South Coast use to share all programming, whilst the Bristol, Bath & Somerset franchise shared the same local breakfast and drive time shows in the south west, with programming from Southampton at other times.

== Greatest Hits Radio ==
In February 2019 The Breeze along with the other Celador Radio stations were sold to Bauer. On 1 September 2020 The Breeze (Bath) was re-branded to Greatest Hits Radio Bath & The South West and began airing mainly networked programming from Greatest Hits Radio.

== Technical ==
Greatest Hits Radio Bath & The South West's Bath signal is broadcast from a transmitter based at Bathampton Down, next to the University of Bath there is also a transmitter in Warminster.

In November 2007, Bath FM moved their studios to Swindon, 35 miles (56 km) away from their broadcast area, after Ofcom agreed to a request from The Local Radio Company to co-locate Bath FM with Brunel FM. On 9 September 2008, under Laser Broadcasting, Bath FM moved back into Station House and once again broadcast from the city until its closure.

== See also ==
- Greatest Hits Radio
- Bauer Radio
