= The Breeze (Frome & West Wiltshire) =

Greatest Hits Radio Somerset (West Somerset)
England
- Broadcast area: Warminster, Westbury, Trowbridge and Frome
- Frequency: 107.5 MHz FM

Programming
- Format: Classic Hits
- Network: Greatest Hits Radio

Ownership
- Owner: Bauer

History
- First air date: 5 November 2001

Technical information
- Transmitter coordinates: 51°26′24″N 2°37′41″W

Links
- Website: GHR West Somerset

Greatest Hits Radio Somerset (West Somerset) is an Independent Local Radio station serving Warminster, Westbury / Trowbridge in West Wiltshire / Frome in East Somerset.

The station, formerly known as The Breeze (Frome and West Somerset), was folded into Greatest Hits Radio South West, as part of a rebrand, on 1 September 2020.

== History ==
The Breeze was proposed to be called Pride FM, until it was launched on 5 November 2001 and named as 3TR FM. During the launch, the station was owned by The Local Radio Company (TLRC). Jonathan Fido was the first presenter to go on air at 8:30am.

The last song played during the test transmissions was 'Sweet Surrender' by Wet Wet Wet. A specially produced introduction was played that featured voice-over clips with jingles and other segments officially launching the station. The first song played was Wake Up Boo! by the Boo Radleys.

Shortly after the main on-air launch, James Moran and David Stratton (High Sheriff of Wiltshire) unveiled a gold coloured plaque in the reception area, in front of photographers and press reporters.

The station's studios in Wiltshire include two broadcast and production studios, a technical equipment hub and a garden adjacent to the River Wylye.

=== Radio ownership changes from 2008-2010 ===
On 30 June 2008 TLRC announced plans to sell six of its stations, including 3TR. It was purchased by Laser Broadcasting, who later went into administration by 28 October 2008 and the group was bought by South West Radio, who also went into administration by August 2009. YMC Ltd became the next new owners of the station along with four other radio stations (including Brunel FM, Bath FM, Quay West 102.4/100.8 and Quay West 107.4) which ran all five stations as a group. There were to be some local shows, including the breakfast and drivetime shows in the week and networked programming at weekends. On 24 March 2010, the five YMC Ltd stations, including 3TR FM, were closed by administrators after multiple refusals on the part of regulator Ofcom to transfer the licences to them from South West Radio. One Gold Radio Ltd was 3TR FM's next owner, its fifth in less than two years. The company bought all five stations through an agreement with Gloucestershire's Total Star, owned by Storm Radio Ltd, and from August 2010 the station was re-branded Total Star. 3TR had broadcast from Boreham Mill in Warminster, but the Total Star broadcasts came from Lime Kiln Studios in Wootton Bassett, near Swindon in Wiltshire, and networked shows were from Cheltenham in Gloucestershire.

In May 2011, it was announced that Total Star in West Wiltshire (along with sister stations in Swindon and Bath) was to be re-branded as More Radio from June 2011, because the owners of the stations, One Gold Radio Ltd (now More FM Ltd), had parted company from Total Star group Storm Radio Ltd.

=== Re-brand ===
The station was then relaunched as The Breeze from November 2011 when Celador acquired the Warminster licence. It had both local and networked presenters.

== See also ==
- The Breeze (radio network)
- Bauer Radio
