= Greatest Hits Radio South West =

- United Kingdom
- Broadcast area: Bristol, Bath, Cornwall, Devon, Gloucestershire Somerset, and Wiltshire
- Frequencies: FM: 100.8 MHz (Porlock); 102.2 MHz (East Cornwall); 102.4 MHz (West Somerset); 105.5 MHz (South Devon); 102.8 MHz (West Cornwall); 105.6 & 106.6 MHz (South Somerset); 106.7 MHz (Plymouth); 107.2 MHz (Bristol); 107.4 MHz (Bridgwater); 107.5 MHz (Cheltenham); 107.5 MHz (Frome and West Wiltshire); 107.7 MHz (Swindon); 107.7 MHz (North Somerset); 107.9 MHz (Bath); DAB: 10B (Somerset); 10C (Gloucestershire); 10C (North Devon); 10D (Bath); 11B (Cornwall); 11B (Bristol); 11C (South Devon); 11C (Swindon); 12D (Plymouth)
- RDS: Grt_Hits
- Branding: The Good Times Sound Like This; Across TSA

Programming
- Format: Classic Hits

Ownership
- Owner: Bauer Radio

History
- First air date: 1 September 2020

Links
- Website: GHR Bristol & The South West; GHR Wiltshire; GHR Somerset; GHR Gloucestershire; GHR Devon; GHR Cornwall; GHR Plymouth; GHR Swindon

Greatest Hits Radio South West is a regional radio station serving the South West of England as part of Bauer's Greatest Hits Radio network.

== Coverage ==
The ten local stations broadcast across the South West of England to the areas of Bristol, Bath, Cornwall, Devon, Gloucestershire, Somerset, and Wiltshire.

== Stations ==
On 1 September 2020 nine local radio stations in the South West of England merged:

- The Breeze (Bath)
- The Breeze (Bridgwater & West Somerset)
- The Breeze (Bristol)
- The Breeze (Cheltenham & North Gloucestershire)
- The Breeze (Frome & West Wiltshire)
- The Breeze (South Devon)
- The Breeze (North Somerset)
- The Breeze (Yeovil & South Somerset)
- Sam FM (Swindon)

On 2 November 2020 a tenth, Radio Plymouth, joined the portfolio.

== History ==
In the Bristol area, originally launched on 26 November 1999 as 107.3 The Eagle and was owned by UKRD. The slogans used were "Bristol's Newest Radio Station" or "Bristol's Fastest Growing Radio Station". Its sister station at the time was also called The Eagle, which is based in Guildford, Surrey and also owned by UKRD.

In 2000, the station name had changed, and was called Star 107.3. The station played a different variety style of adult contemporary music after they changed the format and renewed their licence. In 2004 Star's frequency allocation changed to 107.2 with increased transmitter power for better coverage. UKRD sold the Bristol licence to new owners Tomahawk Radio and shared new premises with another radio station, Bristol's Original 106.5.

From 7 September 2010 Celador became the new licence holders and rebranded Star 107.2 as The Breeze 107.2 on 14 February 2011.

In West Somerset, originally first launched as Quay West and was launched in August 1998. It was later relaunched as Total Star Somerset under the ownership of One Gold Radio and breached Ofcom regulations after transmitting new transmitter power at North Hill at 30,000 watts vertically without permission on the 102.4 frequency. OFCOM said they would then terminate and re-advertise their licence by 1 December 2011. The station has since changed their ownership to Celador, and from midday on 7 August 2011 they joined The Breeze Network.

In Bridgewater, a new radio station went on air on 4 July 2001 as BCR FM under the owners of Choice Media and later was sold to Laser Broadcasting in July 2006.

The station was relaunched as 107.4 Quay West to bring it in line with the other Quay West stations in West Somerset. In August 2010 the two Quay West stations merged as one station called Total Star Somerset and was taken over by One Gold Radio Ltd until 2011.

In Bath and North East Somerset, the original station launched as 107.9 Bath FM from its Bathampton Down transmitter in November 1999 and was a rival station to GWR FM Bath (now Heart). It had several ownerships such as The Local Radio Group in February 2006, Laser Broadcasting from June 2008 and later in the same year as South West Radio Ltd in October. Bath FM relaunched as Total Star Bath in August 2010 after Total Star Gloucestershire company Storm Radio Ltd teamed up with One Gold Radio Ltd, but the two companies soon had separated in 2011 and Total Star Bath along with two other Total Star stations in Swindon and Warminster had changed the name to More Radio in June 2011. More Radio has recently been relaunched in Bath as The Breeze in September 2011 after being bought by Celador.

In Wiltshire, serving Warminster, Westbury and Frome the original station launched in November 2001 was known as 3TR FM and was operated under The Local Radio Company. On 30 June 2008 the station was sold to Laser Broadcasting who went bankrupt on 28 October 2008. The station was then bought out by South West Radio Ltd who also went into administration on 4 August 2009. 3TR was then run under the YMC Ltd group which ran the station along with other radio stations like Brunel FM, Bath FM, plus two Quay West stations as a group of stations until 24 March 2010 when the administrators closed down all the stations on the behalf of OFCOM because of multiple refusals. One Gold Radio and Storm Radio Ltd opened an agreement to re-brand all stations as Total Star before the Warminster licence was acquired by Celador in November 2011 and is rebranded as The Breeze 107.5.

== Programming ==
During the week most programming is shared with the Greatest Hits Radio network in Manchester, London, Birmingham, and Glasgow. A regional three-hour afternoon show is broadcast from the studios of County Gates, Ashton Road in Bristol on weekdays 1pm to 4pm, presented by Tony Wright across the South West except in Cornwall where Scott Temple and Holly Day presents the afternoon show since 17 April 2024. Each localised area in the South West has their own latest local news, weather and travel news updates. Another station, Hits Radio (Bristol & The South West), shares its facilities in the same building and is also owned by Bauer.

== Notable presenters ==
- Jenny Powell
- Alex Lester
- Richard Allinson
- Paul Gambaccini
- Ken Bruce
- Simon Mayo
- Jackie Brambles
- Andy Crane
- Simon Ross ‘Rossie’
- Kate Thornton
- Martin Kemp

=== Past presenters ===
- Janice Long (died 25 December 2021)
- Pat Sharp
- Mark Goodier
