= The Breeze (Bridgwater & West Somerset) =

Coordinates: 51°05′31″N 2°51′25″W

- England
- Broadcast area: Sedgemoor, Bridgwater, Taunton, West Somerset
- Frequencies: 100.8 MHz, 102.4 MHz, 107.4 MHz

Programming
- Format: Hot AC
- Network: The Breeze

Ownership
- Owner: Bauer

History
- First air date: (as Quaywest 102.4) 15 August 1998 (102.4), July 2001 (107.4), March 2004 (100.8), 7 August 2011 (The Breeze)
- Last air date: 31 August 2020

The Breeze (Bridgwater & West Somerset) formerly Quay West and Total Star Somerset was an Independent Local Radio station serving the Sedgemoor District, Bridgwater and West Somerset.

The station was folded into Greatest Hits Radio South West, as part of a rebrand, on 1 September 2020.

== History ==
Quay West 100.4/102.8 was originally launched as 102.4 Quay West Radio on 15 August 1998. Quay West 107.4 was originally launched in July 2001 as BCRfm, before both BCR and Quay West 100.8/102.4 were bought by Choice Media Group. BCRfm was then renamed Quay West 107.4.

=== 102.4 & 100.8 ===
Quaywest 102.4 was originally conceived by an Independent Local Radio presenter Keri Jones, who ran the first restricted service licence (RSL) in 1995. Following a final RSL in December 1996 a county councillor and local businessman, Phil Greatorex, created the financial structure necessary for Quay West Radio Ltd to apply for a full-time licence.

=== 107.4 ===
During the late 1990s, many trial stations took place in Bridgwater and Sedgemoor. The first restricted service licence station went on air in April 1996 on 105.4, under the direction of Keri Jones who had successfully launched Quay West Radio in West Somerset. Between 1996 and 1999, other 4-week trials were operated by companies called Riverside 105, BCR FM, and Sedgemoor Coast FM.

In 1999 the Radio Authority confirmed that Bridgwater would get its own full-time radio service. Four groups entered applications: Bridge FM, BCR FM, Sedgemoor Coast FM and Riverside 105. BCR FM won the licence in May 2000 and went on air on 4 July 2001.

BCRfm was subsequently purchased by Choice Media, and was sold in July 2006 to Laser Broadcasting. The station had always remained a local service for the area, with Mark Painter, Dave Englefield and Nick Rickards from the original restricted service licence team.

The station relaunched at 10pm on 28 February 2007 as Quay West 107.4 to bring it in line with a station of the same name in the Minehead area of West Somerset.

=== Quaywest stations ===
The original transmitter is located on North Hill, Minehead. The signal from the studios is beamed to the transmitter site by a microwave link. The original North Hill transmitter was 1 kW, but in March 2004, permission was granted to increase this to 4 kW from the same site, and a smaller relay was added to cover the area of Porlock, which had previously not been able to receive the station. The frequency for this is 100.8 MHz. Online streaming came in 2003 and was provided by Vivid London Limited. Sister station BCR FM began streaming shortly afterwards. The station had never entered into RAJAR (the organization that measures audiences for radio) until 2005, where, in its first survey, out of a total potential audience of 28,000 adults (15+), the station's reach was 8,000, or 37% of the population, per week.

In 2005, Quay West was re-branded "Quay FM". This was short lived, and "Quay West" was reinstated in 2006. Ten years after launch, the studios were still located in the offices of a disused weighbridge that overlooks the marina providing line of sight to the transmitter.

The first jingles were made by Bespoke Music and featured a chime melody based on the bells of Dunster's St. George's Church, which the station retained until 2001. A further ident package was produced by Steve England. In September 2008, it was suggested parent company Laser Broadcasting were in financial trouble and posts on forums suggested the company had failed to pay its staff for several months.

On 3 October 2008, it was announced that a petition to wind-up Laser had been published.

Later that month, it was reported that Laser Broadcasting had volunteered to go into administration. Then came the revelation that the stations would be run in the interim by Bridgwater Broadcasting Services (BBS) Ltd whilst administrators were appointed. Both stations were then taken over along with 3 other stations by a new company, South West Radio Ltd.

After Laser Broadcasting went into administration, the two Quaywest stations were bought by South West Radio Ltd.

In 2009, South West Radio also went into administration. A new company, Your Media Communications Group plc, was formed and took over ownership of the assets of South West Radio, including Swindon-based Brunel FM and nearby Bath FM and 3TR FM.

Communications regulator Ofcom refused to transfer the licences to Your Media Group (YMC) in December 2009 and again in 2010. The licences remain with the original Ltd companies and therefore effectively all 5 radio services, including the two Quaywest stations, remain in administration.

On 24 March 2010, the five Your Media Communications Group Ltd stations were closed by administrators after multiple refusals on the part of regulator OFCOM to transfer the licences, following a number of financial issues at the stations following TLRC's sale.

In early 2010, the 5 stations were purchased by One Gold Radio Ltd and in August 2010 the stations were relaunched using the Total Star brand owned by Red Media Services Ltd through a service agreement. Quaywest, plus its four sister stations, Brunel FM, 3TR FM, Bath FM, and Quaywest 107.4, were eventually bought by Celador, who run TotalStar 107.5 in Gloucestershire; all stations were rebranded as TotalStar.

In Quaywest Online was the new version of Quaywest FM, broadcasting online, with former Quay West FM presenters Dave Englefield, Mark Painter, David Mortimer, Brian Leaker, Nick Francis, Lisa Coombes, and James Aldred.

Ofcom revoked the licence, announcing it would terminate at the end of 2011.

=== The Breeze ===
In August 2011, Ofcom confirmed that they would be shortening the licence for the Bridgwater and West Somerset FM licences, triggering a re-advertisement of the licences., stating that "...in view of the licensee's unsatisfactory record of compliance with licence conditions, we will not be implementing the special application procedure...". Subsequent to this, it was announced that The Breeze, which already operated in Bristol (formerly as Star 107.2), and which had recently been awarded the re-advertised Total Star Bath licence, would acquire the remainder of the existing Somerset licence and broadcast The Breeze on the former QuayWest and BCR frequencies from Sunday 7 August 2011. The re-advertisement of the licence will still go ahead, and it is likely that The Breeze will apply to be awarded the 'new' replacement licence.

In December 2011, Midwest Radio stations in Yeovil and Dorset were sold Celador Radio after Midwest Radio Ltd decided not to contest with the Bridgwater licence.

After an approval request with Ofcom, both stations were relaunched as The Breeze at midnight on 25 June 2012, merging with The Breeze in Bridgwater.

== See also ==
- The Breeze (radio network)
- Bauer Radio
