= Total Star Warminster =

England
- Broadcast area: Warminster, Westbury & Frome
- Frequency: 107.5 MHz

Programming
- Format: Contemporary

Ownership
- Owner: One Gold Radio Ltd

History
- First air date: 5 November 2001

Total Star Warminster was an Independent Local Radio station which broadcast on 107.5 FM in Warminster, Wiltshire, England and is owned by One Gold Radio Ltd. The station was relaunched as More FM in June 2011. On 2 November 2011, Celador acquired the Warminster licence and rebranded the station as The Breeze.

== History ==
On 5 November 2001, after a period of test transmissions, Jonathan Fido presented the first live programme - the breakfast show at 8:30am, accompanied by local people, staff from the Local Radio Company and the station's crew at the time.

The last song to be played before officially going live was 'Sweet Surrender' by Wet Wet Wet. A specially-produced introduction was then played featuring a montage of voice-overs, clips and other segments officially launching the station. The first song played was 'Wake Up Boo!' by the Boo Radleys.

Shortly after the on air launch, James Moran and David Stratton (High Sheriff of Wiltshire) unveiled a gold plaque in the reception area of the station live on air, in front of many photographers and press reporters.

The station's Studio in Wiltshire includes two broadcast and production studios, several offices, 'glass room' (now dismantled), technical equipment hub and garden adjacent to the River Wylye.

On 30 June 2008 TLRC announced plans to sell six of its stations, including 3TR. It was purchased by Laser Broadcasting, who later went bust and the group was bought by South West Radio, who also went into administration. On 24 March 2010, the 5 YMC Ltd stations, including 3TR, were closed by administrators after multiple refusals on the part of regulator OFCOM to transfer the licenses to them from SWR.

One Gold Radio Ltd is 3TR FM's latest owner, its fifth in less than two years. The company bought all of the stations previously owned by South West Radio Ltd. Through an agreement with Gloucestershire's Total Star owned by Storm Radio Ltd, the station was rebranded Total Star. The radio station broadcast from Boreham Mill, in Warminster, but it is believed that it will now be aired from new offices, and will be sharing programmes with the five other stations.

The final schedule was as follows:

- Monday - Thursday:
- 07:00 - 11:00 Nick Burrett - Breakfast
- 11:00 - 14:00 Drew Haddon - The Soundtrack To Your Workday
- 14:00 - 19:00 Ray King - Afternoons/Hits 'n' Headlines Drivetime
- 19:00 - 07:00 Non-stop music and news on the hour
- Friday:
- 07:00 - 11:00 Nick Burrett - Breakfast
- 11:00 - 14:00 Drew Haddon - 'The Soundtrack To Your Workday'
- 14:00 - 19:00 Ray King - Afternoons/Hits 'n' Headlines Drivetime
- 19:00 - 00:00 PartyZone
- Saturday:
- 08:00 - 12:00 Ray King - The Saturday Breakfast
- 12:00 - 14:00 Drew Haddon - The Saturday Pop Quiz
- 14:00 - 18:00 Tom Smith - Saturday Afternoons
- 18:00 - 20:00 Gary King - Totally Eighties
- 20:00 - 00:00 PartyZone
- Sunday:
- 08:00 – 12:00 Sunday Breakfast with Tom Smith
- 12:00 – 16:00 Sunday Life with Steve Collins
- 16:00 – 19:00 Rich and Kat Big Top 40
- 19:00 – 22-00 Vinyl Countdown with Dave Englefield
- 22:00 – 00:00 Non-stop music and news on the hour

As from March 2010, when it went into administration, the following list of songs and the "107.5 3TR FM" voiceover are the only things that can be heard when tuning into the station. (arranged alphabetically - tracks are not played in this order).

- Alanis Morissette - Ironic
- Anastacia - Left Outside Alone
- Aretha Franklin - I Knew You Were Waiting (For Me)
- Blondie - The Tide is High
- Electric Light Orchestra - Livin' Thing
- Everything but the Girl - Missing
- Howard Jones - What Is Love
- Huey Lewis - The Power of Love
- Just Jack - Starz in Their Eyes
- Kaiser Chiefs - Ruby
- Lily Allen - Smile
- Nelly Furtado - All Good Things (Come to an End)
- Oasis - Wonderwall
- Simon Webbe - My Soul Pleads for You
- The Lighthouse Family - Ocean Drive
- Womack & Womack - Teardrops
- Yazoo - Don't Go

In August 2010 The 107.5 frequency was relaunched, along with 4 other stations in the West Country, as Total Star.
