= Heart Wiltshire =

- Swindon; England
- Broadcast area: Swindon and west Wiltshire
- Frequencies: FM: 102.2 MHz; 96.5 MHz; 97.2 MHz, RDS Name: Heart___; NOW Swindon DAB multiplex NOW Wiltshire DAB multiplex and Online
- Branding: This is Heart

Programming
- Format: Hot AC

Ownership
- Owner: Global

History
- First air date: 12 October 1982 (as Wiltshire Radio)
- Last air date: 31 May 2019

Heart Wiltshire (formerly GWR FM Wiltshire) was an Independent Local Radio station owned and operated by Global Radio as part of the Heart network. It broadcast to north and west Wiltshire. The station was rebranded to Heart in March 2009 in line with Global Radio's rebranding of most of the One Network, which the station was part of. Its local competitors were Sam FM, BBC Wiltshire and community radio station, Swindon 105.5.

On 31 May 2019, it was merged into Heart West.

== History ==
Heart Wiltshire launched on 12 October 1982 under its original name, Wiltshire Radio (shortened often to WR). Broadcasting from 'The Limekiln' in Wootton Bassett, they capitalised on the fact that BBC Radio 1 had bad reception in North Wiltshire and it was to be seven years before BBC Local Radio launched in the county. The station began a full service commercial radio station on 96.4 and 97.4 MHz FM and 936 and 1161 kHz AM (320 and 258 metres medium wave).

Because there was a lack of BBC Radio for Wiltshire and therefore no competition, Wiltshire Radio found it relatively easy to build a very loyal listenership and only a few months into broadcasting became very profitable. Early programmes started out with a general diet of local news, community information, talk and middle-of-the-road pop music, then eventually became more and more formatted, saving its 4-hour 'needle time' daily music quota for the evening show to play rock and newer pop. The station's Head of Programmes Ralph Bernard went on to become a very significant figure in British commercial radio as founder of Classic FM.

Commercial radio in Britain struggled to make any money. Wiltshire Radio grew as a company, capitalising on its dominance in the local radio market. WR made tentative plans for growth as it set to acquire struggling Bristol station Radio West. Radio West never made a penny since it started and looked set to close when WR made an official approach to merge the two stations, creating a station covering from Weston-super-Mare in the west to Swindon and Hungerford in the east. This merger was approved by the British Government and was completed in 1985.

=== Wiltshire Radio into GWR ===
In October 1985, Wiltshire Radio relaunched as GWR Radio, a 24-hour radio station (previously Wiltshire Radio closed overnight). However the sound did not change much as GWR Radio was essentially a revamp which coincided with the re-launch of its sister station in Bristol.

=== Split services ===
GWR Radio began splitting frequencies as required by the British Government – which declared its desire to end simulcasting on both FM and AM. In November 1988, GWR Radio launched Brunel Radio, a golden oldies service (now part of the Gold) network whilst GWR FM launched an opt-out service for West Wiltshire as a more localised service, this was however dropped a few weeks later, citing "poor reception". A fill-in relay for Marlborough was opened on 14 October 1988 on 96.5 MHz FM.

After the lifting on sanctions restricting the time spent playing music (so-called 'needle time') in 1988, GWR FM became more and more music-led, playing Top 40 chart music during the daytime, and specialist music (big band music, rock, rap etc.) was over time eliminated. The local element of the station especially its news coverage had progressively become briefer and reduced in length, then moved onto Brunel Classic Gold, before being dropped altogether.

=== Football sponsorship ===
The station sponsored Swindon Town Football Club from 1989 until 1991, during the time that they won promotion to the First Division via the playoffs, but remained in the Second Division due to financial irregularities.

=== GWR FM – Reboot ===
In 1992 a re-launch of the station saw it rebranded as The New GWR FM, with a policy of reduced speech and the dropping of all R&B and hip hop music from the station's output. This policy was gradually extended to other GWR Group stations, such as 2-Ten FM in Reading and 2CR FM in Bournemouth. The GWR Group expanded from the late 1980s through to 2005, purchasing other stations throughout southern England, eventually becoming the largest radio company in the UK.

=== The Mix Network ===
The harmonisation of playlists across the GWR Group led to the creation of The Mix Network in 1997, with GWR Wiltshire at the hub. The radio station's (and the group's) long held philosophy of heavily researching the average person's listening habits and tastes led by Group chairman Ralph Bernard created a tightly formatted sound where popular Top 40 chart hits and ex-Top 40 songs are blended in with older hits. This format, with the strapline "Better Music Mix", was then subsequently adopted by all stations within the GWR Group, including Essex FM, Trent FM and Beacon Radio creating a mini national network.

The practice for the Mix Network stations were each station played a centrally produced playlist (from GWR FM itself), songs were broadcast on or almost at the same time as neighbouring group stations and each station adopted the "Better Music Mix" tagline, to be said by local disc jockeys in between each song. Fans of the previous guises of some stations bought by the GWR Group, notably Essex FM and Beacon Radio criticised the sudden re-branding of the station's taglines and playlists, accusing the new management of reducing local content such as news reports and cancelling local shows in place of programming from the Mix Network, such as Late Night Love and The Request Fest, which originated from the Bristol studios.

=== Now Digital ===
In 2003, Now Digital, a subsidiary of GWR Group launched local DAB services for Wiltshire and Swindon. In Swindon GWR FM went digital along with sister station Classic Gold, BBC Radio Swindon, Swindon FM and XFM amongst others. In West Wiltshire and Bath GWR FM Bath and BBC Radio Wiltshire aired in place of GWR Swindon and Radio Swindon respectively.

=== The One Network ===
On 9 May 2005, GWR Group merged with Capital Radio Group to form GCap Media. The programming format of GWR was essentially unchanged by the merger, with The Mix Network being rebranded as The One Network.

=== Global Radio takeover ===
In 2008, GCap Media was taken over by Global Radio, who subsequently announced that GWR Wiltshire, in common with many other of the other One Network stations, would be rebranded Heart, by 2010. GWR subsequently relaunched as Heart Wiltshire on 23 March 2009.

GWR's oldies service was originally called Brunel Radio, after the Great Western Railway's founding father Isambard Kingdom Brunel.

== Closure ==
On 26 February 2019, Global announced Heart Wiltshire would be merged with three sister stations in Bristol and Somerset, Devon and Cornwall and Gloucestershire.

Since 3 June 2019, local output has consisted of a three-hour regional Drivetime show on weekdays, alongside localised news bulletins, traffic updates and advertising.

Heart Wiltshire's studios in Swindon closed with operations moving to Bristol – the station ceased local programming on 31 May 2019. Local breakfast and weekend shows were replaced with network programming from London.

Heart West began broadcasting regional programming on 3 June 2019.

== Notable former presenters ==
- Ralph Bernard
- Myleene Klass
- Scott Mills
- Vic Morgan
- Kirsten O'Brien
- Peter Rowell
- Tim Smith
- Graham Torrington
- Charlie Wolf

== See also ==
- Heart
- Heart Bath
- Heart Bristol
- GCap Media
- The One Network
