= Sam FM Radio (Swindon) =

Sam FM (Swindon)
- The last logo used by the station
- England
- Broadcast area: Swindon
- Frequencies: FM: 107.7 MHz; DAB: (Swindon)

Programming
- Format: Easy listening

Ownership
- Owner: Bauer Radio

History
- First air date: September 2, 2006
- Last air date: September 1, 2020
- Former names: Brunel FM; Total Star; More Radio; Jack FM; Sam FM

Sam FM Swindon was an Independent Local Radio station based in Swindon, England, broadcasting on the 107.7 FM frequency between 2006 and 2020.

The station was formed by The Local Radio Company, who wanted to create a local radio rival to GWR FM (now Heart). It started in 2006 as Brunel FM. It would eventually be owned by One Gold Radio Ltd who renamed it to Total Star Swindon, and then More Radio a few years later. Celador purchased More Radio in 2012 and converted it into Jack FM Swindon which was later re-branded to SamFM Swindon.

Due to financial issues and budget cuts at Celador, SamFM Swindon was merged into the Bristol sister station of the same name. In 2020, SamFM was purchased by Bauer Radio, closed, and its frequency used to broadcast Greatest Hits Radio South West.

== History ==
=== Brunel FM ===
In 2005, after radio group Swindon FM lobbied for a second FM licence for the area, Ofcom invited applications for a 12-year broadcasting licence. The Local Radio Company applied, proposing a station called Now FM. After being awarded the licence, it was renamed Brunel FM after Isambard Kingdom Brunel, chief engineer of the railway which had transformed Swindon from a small village to a large town. Brunel was also the previous name for AM station Classic Gold Radio (now DAB station Gold) when Wiltshire Radio/GWR FM (now Heart Wiltshire) launched on FM. However, Brunel FM and Brunel Radio/Brunel Classic Gold did not have any connection other than their name and studio location.

Brunel FM launched at 10 am on 2 September 2006, and remained under control of The Local Radio Company until its sale to Laser Broadcasting in June 2008, along with sister stations Bath FM and 3TR FM. Following the buyout a number of the station's staff resigned, allegedly due to lack of payment.

In October 2008, Brunel FM was sold again to South West Radio Ltd, following the collapse of Laser Broadcasting which went into administration.

In August 2009, South West Radio itself collapsed and was also placed into administration. Brunel FM was then acquired by YMC Ltd, along with Bath FM, 3TR FM, Quay West 107.4 and Quay West 102.4/100.8. YMC Ltd then ran the five licensed stations as a group, with local programming throughout the day and some networked output over the weekend. On 24 March 2010, the YMC stations were closed by administrators after multiple refusals on the part of regulator Ofcom to transfer the licences, amid a number of financial issues at the stations following TLRC's sale.

=== Total Star Swindon ===
Brunel FM and its sister stations – 3TR FM, Bath FM and the two Quaywest stations – were eventually bought by One Gold Radio Ltd. All five stations were rebranded Total Star as part of an agreement with Total Star 107.5 in Gloucestershire, owned by Storm Radio Ltd.

=== More Radio ===
In May 2011, it was announced that Total Star Swindon (along with sister stations in West Wiltshire and Bath) would be rebranded to More Radio from June 2011, after owners One Gold Radio Ltd (now More FM Ltd) ended their partnership with the Cheltenham-based Total Star group. The group decided not to contest the renewal of the Bath licence, which was awarded to Celador and was rebranded as The Breeze in September 2011. More FM also sold the 107.5 Warminster/Frome area licence to Celador, who turned it into The Breeze in November 2011.

=== Jack FM ===
It was announced in April 2012 Celador had bought the final More Radio licence in Swindon. Just over a month later, on 28 May 2012, the station was relaunched as Jack FM Swindon.

=== Sam FM rebrand and merger ===
Less than three years later, on 1 April 2015, the station was rebranded again to Sam FM.

On 25 May 2016, OFCOM announced it had granted Celador permission to merge the station with its sister station in Bristol. The company said the Swindon station was not financially viable as a stand-alone service, having made a £50,000 loss in 2015. The station's sole local programme – the weekday breakfast show That Swindon Thing – was axed, although opt outs for local news bulletins, traffic updates and what's on information will continue.

== Closure ==
Sam FM Swindon stopped transmitting on 1 September 2020 and the frequency was given to the Greatest Hits Radio national network.

== See also ==
- Sam FM (Bristol)
