= Sam FM (Bristol) =

- Bristol; United Kingdom
- Broadcast area: Bristol and Bath
- Frequency: 106.5 MHz

Programming
- Format: Modern AC
- Network: Hits Radio

Ownership
- Owner: Bauer Radio

History
- First air date: 20 May 2007
- Last air date: 6 September 2021

Links
- Website: Sam FM

Sam FM was an adult hits format radio station that broadcast on 106.5 MHz FM in Bristol, United Kingdom and owned by Bauer Radio. The station formed part of the Hits Radio network, although its entire output and playlist was locally produced and took no network programming. It ceased broadcasting on 6 September 2021 when it rebranded to Hits Radio Bristol & The South West.

== History ==
=== Original 106.5 ===
The station was awarded its original broadcast licence in September 2006 as Original 106.5, and commenced broadcasting on 20 May 2007. It was owned by a group of investors under the name Tomahawk Radio. The station originally broadcast an Adult Oriented format, with 40% of its music coming from past or present Top 20 charts.

=== Jack FM ===
106 Jack FM replaced Original, which had previously broadcast using the same frequency, on 2 December 2009 following a staged on-air argument and station hijacking the previous day.

The station was acquired by Celador Radio on 7 September 2010.

=== Rebrand to Sam FM and merger ===
From 1 April 2015, the Jack FM name was dropped in favour of Sam FM by the station owner Celador Radio, who decided on changing the name six months beforehand. The station's topical imaging are voiced by actor and comedian Gareth Hale (of Hale and Pace).

On 25 May 2016, OFCOM announced it had granted Celador permission to merge the station with its sister station in Swindon. The company said the Swindon station was not financially viable as a stand-alone service, having made a £50,000 loss in 2015. The station continued to broadcast its weekday breakfast show from Bristol – shared with the Swindon station – and retained local news bulletins, traffic updates and what's on information.

Following the purchase of Celador Radio by Bauer Radio in 2019, Sam FM Swindon became part of the Greatest Hits Radio network in September 2020, leaving the Bristol Sam FM as a standalone operation again.

=== DAB ===
Sam FM was removed from DAB in 2015, but three years later was re-added to Bristol's DAB Mux in a bid to increase listener reach.

== Hits Radio Bristol & The South West and Magic Radio ==
On 6 September 2021, Sam FM was rebranded as Hits Radio Bristol & The South West. The station takes the national networked breakfast show from Hits Radio UK hosted by Fleur East, James Barr & Matt weekdays from 6am–10am. The drive-time slot was hosted by Max & Jason weekdays from 4pm–7pm. From Monday 4 September, this was moved to 10am–1pm.

As of March 2024, the station broadcasts to a weekly audience of 54,000 listeners, according to RAJAR.

On 22nd September 2024, Hits Radio Bristol & The South West on 106.5MHz was renamed to Hits Radio West of England. Not only that it's broadcasting on 106.5MHz, it is also broadcasting on the former Kiss Frequencies on 97.2MHz & 101.0MHz.

On 31st March 2025, Hits Radio West Of England on 106.5FM was rebranded as Magic Radio Bristol at 12:07am. Last presenter on Hits Radio West Of England on 106.5FM was Hattie Pearson and the last song that played was Feels Like I'm Falling In Love by Coldplay.

== See also ==
- Greatest Hits Radio Bristol & The South West
- Hits Radio South Coast
- Greatest Hits Radio South Coast
- Greatest Hits Radio Swindon
