= AM Gold =

AM Gold may refer to:

- AM Gold (album), 2022, by Train
- AM Gold, a series of compilation albums made by Time-Life
- Gold 1530AM
- Classic Gold 954/1530 AM

== See also ==
- Gold (The Fucking Am album)
