= Heart 102.6 =

Heart 102.6 may refer to:

- Heart South in Witney, Oxfordshire
- Heart Chelmsford in Chelmsford
- Heart Somerset in Somerset
