= The Breeze (Bristol) =

England
- Broadcast area: Bristol
- Frequency: 107.2FM (Bristol)

Programming
- Format: Easy listening
- Network: The Breeze

Ownership
- Owner: Bauer

History
- First air date: 28 November 1999
- Last air date: 31 August 2020
- Former names: The Eagle; Star; The Breeze

Technical information
- Transmitter coordinates: 51.4852°N 2.5627°W

The Breeze (Bristol) was an Independent Local Radio station serving Bristol.

The station was folded into Greatest Hits Radio South West, as part of a rebrand, on 1 September 2020.

== History ==
It started out as Kute FM on 105.8 MHz FM in February 1998, being partly owned by Western Newspapers. Then on 26 November 1999, it became 107.3 The Eagle, a name similar to two other of UKRD's stations in Guildford and Cambridge. It rebranded in 2001 to Star 107.3 and in January 2004, the frequency moved to 107.2 MHz FM. The station played pop hits mainly from the 1980s and 1990s with a target audience aiming towards female adults between 25–35. The studios were originally in the Bristol Evening Post building on Temple Way in Bristol.

On 7 September 2010, Southampton based Celador Radio acquired Tomahawk Radio Limited, the owners of 106.5 Jack FM and Star 107.2 FM, and in February 2011 the station's name was changed to The Breeze 107.2.

=== Licence applications ===
In its pre-launch guise, Kute FM was a pirate radio station, broadcasting in an under-served radio landscape in Bristol – with only Radio Bristol and GWR FM being well established as well as other pirates. Kute broadcast legally as a training facility in 1995, with a further trail in February 1998 in a joint arrangement with the Bristol Evening Post newspaper group and radio group UKRD with a view to gaining a permanent licence. The Radio Authority were formally advertising licence applications for several areas in the UK – including Bristol. A total of six applied for the City of Bristol licence.

- Cabot FM (City of Bristol Broadcasting Company Ltd.)
- Future Radio Ltd.
- Respec Radio (Respec Radio Ltd)
- Kute FM (Bristol Community Radio Ltd)
- Powerjam Rad, io
- Republic Radio

Powerjam Radio, Respec Radio and Future Radio applied with an urban music format, and these applicants felt that broadcasting legitimately would create a radio format that would be a truly local service that would serve the city's Afro-Caribbean community- which they would say are consistently ignored by the mass media. However the eight-year licence was awarded to Kute FM, in recognition of the support from UKRD and the Bristol Evening Post. It proposed a soft rock and classic soul format, with ten hours dedicated to specialist music genres including R 'n' B and jazz. A speech minimum of 30% was also put forward with shows geared towards the Afro-Caribbean and other minority communities.

=== On-air ===
On 26 November 1999, Kute FM changed name launched as 107.3 The Eagle. The station was designed by UKRD CEO, Mike Powell and fashioned on the existing 96.4 The Eagle in Guildford, complete with logo, also owned by UKRD. Its advertising campaign was carried out by advertising agency "The Creative Department" and posters featuring well-known lyrics from pop songs were splashed out on the back of First buses and newspaper ads. ironically in the Bristol Evening Post and Western Daily Press, its pre-launch partners. On-air The Eagle featured a fairly lively sound complete with jingles to reinforce the new name in listener's minds.

In 2000 The Eagle changed name to Star 107.3 with a new slogan and different playlist, integrating the licence remit into an adult contemporary music format.

In 2004, Star underwent a slight frequency change to 107.2 MHz FM and a power increase to better cover Bristol.

On 2 March 2009, the station was taken over by Tomahawk Radio, the owners of Bristol's Original 106.5. Star now shares studios with its sister station in the County Gates building on Ashton Road, Bristol.

=== Re-brand ===
On 20 January 2011, Star 107.2 owners Celador Radio, announced that the station will re-brand to The Breeze 107.2 on 14 February 2011, following OFCOM agreeing to a format change.

=== Licence awarded for Bath ===
On 24 May 2011, Celador Radio won the re-advertised local radio licence for Bath. More FM then began broadcasting as The Breeze on the 107.9 FM frequency on 25 September 2011.

=== In Somerset ===
In August 2011, The Breeze acquired three frequencies in Somerset previously operated as Total Star Somerset. These frequencies have begun operating as The Breeze on Sunday, 7 August 2011.

== Slogans ==
- 1999- Bristol's Newest Radio Station, Bristol's Fastest Growing Radio Station
- 2000- Bristol's Best Music / More Hits From More Years
- 2001- Better Music and More of it
- 2004- Real Music Variety
- 2005- Music to make you feel good!
- 2005–6- Playing great songs others don't
- 2008- More Music Variety
- 2009- Your Station, Your Music
- 2011- The Smoothest Sounds in the South West
- 2013- Tune In, Feel Good
- 2019- Your Easy Place To Relax
- 2020- The Good Times Sound Like This

== See also ==
- Sam FM (Bristol)
