= Original 106 (disambiguation) =

Original 106 is an independent radio station broadcasting to Aberdeen, Dundee, and Perth in Scotland.

Original 106 may also refer to:

- Original 106 (Solent), formerly a radio station broadcasting to the Solent region of southern England
- Original 106.5 (Bristol), formerly a radio station broadcasting to Bristol, England
