= Peter Rowell =

English radio and television presenter and convicted criminal

- Born: Henry Rowell; 10 May 1958 (age 68); Sunderland, County Durham, England, UK
- Occupations: Broadcaster; radio DJ; newsreader
- Employers: BBC Radio Newcastle; BBC Radio Bristol; GWR FM; HTV
- Known for: Geordie Racer
- Criminal charges: Indecent assault and making indecent images of children
- Criminal status: Released from prison
- Children: 1

Peter Rowell (born 10 May 1958) is an English former radio and television presenter.

Rowell spent much of his career working in the West of England. In March 2012, he was jailed for six years after admitting 12 charges of indecent sexual assault against underage girls and further charges of making and possessing indecent images of children.

== Career ==
Born in Sunderland, County Durham, Rowell began his career as a presenter for BBC Radio Newcastle. During this time, he played the role of a fictional DJ in the 1988 drama series Geordie Racer as part of the long-running BBC Schools series Look and Read.

Towards the end of the decade, Rowell moved to Bristol to become a presenter for GWR FM. Around this time, he also worked for HTV West (now ITV West Country) as a continuity announcer, before joining the station full-time in 1997 as a daytime bulletin newsreader. While at HTV, Rowell also worked as a features reporter and presented a number of non-news regional programmes.

After the death of Princess Diana in 1997, Rowell faced a disciplinary hearing after saying "she had huge knockers" after footage of the princess was shown and not realising the microphone was switched on.

He left ITV West in May 2010 and joined BBC Radio Bristol to present its weekday afternoon and Sunday morning shows. He left the BBC a year later after his contract expired.

== Personal life ==
Rowell is divorced with one child and, prior to his imprisonment, lived in Wickwar, Gloucestershire. Rowell has also supported various charities including the National Animal Support League and KWADS (Knowle West Against Drugs).

== Indecent assaults conviction ==
On 29 March 2011, Rowell was reported missing after he failed to turn up for work at the BBC's Bristol studios and could not be contacted. Rowell was found in Keswick in Cumbria 36 hours after he was last seen at a supermarket in Yate. He was arrested a day later.

On 22 April 2011, Avon and Somerset Police charged Rowell with four counts of indecent assault, dating back to the late 1980s and early 1990s. A month later, he was also charged with seven counts of possessing and making indecent images of children along with seven counts of indecent assault against four girls under the age of sixteen. Rowell appeared before North Avon magistrates' court on 10 June 2011 to face further charges relating to a fifth victim, including rape against a 16-year-old and two counts of sexual assault. and was released on bail with conditions attached until October 2011.

The case was committed to trial in October 2011 after Rowell pleaded not guilty to a total of seventeen charges of rape, indecent assault and making and possessing indecent images. At Bristol Crown Court on 13 January 2012, Rowell admitted 12 charges of indecent assault against five girls under the age of 16 and seven counts of making and possessing child pornography. The rape charge was downgraded to indecent assault, which the court accepted. Avon and Somerset Police said many of the offences had occurred while Rowell was working as a presenter for GWR FM and took place at the station's former studios at St. Augustine's Reach on the Bristol waterfront. On 2 March 2012, Judge David Ticehurst sentenced Rowell to six years in prison and placed him on the sex offender register.

On 1 April 2026, Rowell was returned to prison for 24 weeks after admitting breaking the conditions of his sexual offenders sentence.
