= Murfin Music International =

- Type: Media
- Industry: Broadcasting
- Headquarters: Kempsey, Worcestershire, England
- Products: Local radio, radio jingles

Murfin Music International and Murfin Media are companies run by Muff Murfin, and are based at The Old Smithy Studios in Kempsey, Worcestershire, England.

Murfin owns several radio stations in the UK, and also hires time at its studios to produce jingles for radio. Murfin, with his then music partner, Colin Owen, were billed as the M and O Band, and reached No. 16 in the UK Singles Chart in March 1976 with "Let's Do the Latin Hustle". The track was a cover version of the original recorded in 1975 by Eddie Drennon and B.B.S. Unlimited.

== Biography ==
Murfin was a director and founder shareholder of The Bear 102 in Stratford-upon-Avon. The station started broadcasting in 1996. The Bear was later sold to the CN Group in 2001.

In 1998, Murfin became a director and significant founding shareholder of Mansfield 103.2, until he sold the shares in 2008. The station is local in output with all programmes being produced in the town. In 1999, Murfin purchased the Classic Gold station which serves Worcestershire and Herefordshire from GWR. Again, new studios were built and the station was moved to the new premises adjacent to the AM transmitter site in Worcester. The station was later re-launched as Classic Hits and then Sunshine 1530.

Murfin has written, performed and provided a wide range of music for advertising, radio and television programmes and his jingles have run on radio stations in the United Kingdom and around the world.

== Radio stations ==
=== Current ===
- Sunshine Radio (Ludlow) which serves South Shropshire, Herefordshire & Worcestershire
- Sunshine Radio which serves Herefordshire and Monmouthshire
- Radio Wyvern which serves Herefordshire and Worcestershire
- BRMB which serves Birmingham

=== Closed ===
- Sunshine 1530 which served Herefordshire and Worcestershire
- Radio Maldwyn which served Mid Wales and The Borders

=== Former ===
- Mansfield 103.2 which serves north Nottinghamshire and north east Derbyshire

== Production ==
=== Radio jingles ===
They were the UK agent for TM Studios.
