= Fresh Radio =

Former radio station covering Yorkshire and Lancashire, in England

Coordinates: 53.952°N 2.088°W

England
- Broadcast area: Yorkshire Dales (Western North Yorkshire, Northern West Yorkshire, Southeastern Cumbria & Northern Lancashire)
- Frequencies: 936 MW (Hawes); 102.6 FM (Richmond); 107.1 FM (Ilkley); 107.1 FM (Pateley Bridge); 107.8 FM; RDS Name "FRESH"

Programming
- Format: Hot AC

Ownership
- Owner: Utopia Broadcasting Limited

History
- First air date: 4 May 1997
- Last air date: 6 January 2012

Links
- Website: Fresh Radio: Home Page Archive Copy (3 January 2012)

Fresh Radio was an Independent Local Radio station broadcasting to the Yorkshire Dales in northern England on two medium wave (AM) frequencies and three FM frequencies. It was also heard online via the Fresh Radio website.

== Transmission ==
Two of the three AM frequencies were originally to be switched off by April 2007 and replaced by FM transmitters in Skipton, Ilkley, Pateley Bridge, Settle, Richmond and Grassington. The FM transmitter for Richmond on 102.6 FM commenced broadcasts on 11 February 2007 on 102.6 FM, however the rollout elsewhere was delayed, and AM kept being broadcast in Richmond, alongside the FM frequency.

The Ilkley transmitter also began broadcasting on 107.1 FM as of 18 February 2007, a frequency also used by the former AM Pateley Bridge transmitter, while AM broadcasting continued on 936 AM covering Wensleydale, 1413 AM from Skipton and 1431 AM from Settle.

The station's main studio was based at Broughton Hall near Skipton. Fresh Radio broadcast to an area of approximately 2,000 square miles (5,200 km^{2}) to an adult population of around 200,000 people.

Its coverage area was, broadly, bounded by the M6 motorway to the west, the A1(M) to the east, the A66 to the north, and the towns of Skipton, Keighley and Ilkley to the south.

== Digital Radio ==
In September 2007 it was announced that the station would launch on DAB across North Yorkshire. The same month MuxCo applied for a local DAB Digital Radio licence to cover the North Yorkshire area, and was awarded the licence in December 2007. It aimed initially to commence broadcasting in mid-2009.

== Content ==
The station featured a variety of music, with contemporary recording artists from the 1960s to the present day, local and national news, weather, travel, quizzes and local information.

== History ==
Fresh Radio was launched 4 May 1997 as Yorkshire Dales Radio with the strapline "May the fourth be with you". The station was re-launched in 1999 as Fresh AM, with a slight change of name two years later to Fresh Radio pending the introduction of FM frequencies.

The station was originally owned by a group of local shareholders with a board of founding directors including Chris Parkin (chairman) and James Wilson (Company Secretary), it was then acquired by Laser Broadcasting, and then Utopia Broadcasting Ltd, which was owned by local businessman Roger Tempest, owner of Broughton Hall, near Skipton.

Under head of news James Wilson, Fresh Radio's coverage of local news was mentioned in opinion presented by Boris Johnson to the 2004 House of Commons Second Standing Committee on Delegated Legislation, following the 2001 Foot and Mouth outbreak. Johnson stated: "I believe that it [Fresh Radio] was an important focal point during the foot and mouth outbreak... It would be hard to think of a more perfect definition of a community radio".

The station was sold to UKRD on Friday 6 January 2012 and went into automated programming. The last presenter heard on air was Nick Babb. It ceased transmission at 6 pm on the same day.

Plans were unveiled to merge the station into Stray FM, covering an enlarged coverage area from existing studios in Harrogate but Stray FM subsequently dropped transmission to the northern Dales, leaving the area previously covered by the 936 kHz AM transmitter at Hawes with no independent local commercial radio. However, a new community station, Dales Radio, was licensed in November 2013 and broadly covers the area which lost out when UKRD decided to cease broadcasting the enlarged Stray FM in the northern Dales area. Dales Radio started broadcasting on 11 January 2016 and featured a number of former Fresh Radio presenters and staff. It expanded further into the former Fresh Radio area in 2021 when it installed new transmitter sites in unserved parts of the region.

== Awards ==
Fresh Radio was named "Yorkshire and The North East Radio Station of the Year" in 2004, and again in 2006, by the Radio Academy.
