= Sunshine Radio (Herefordshire and Monmouthshire) =

Coordinates: 52.0552°N 2.7178°W

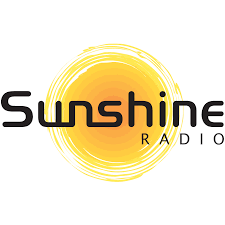
- Hereford; England
- Broadcast area: Herefordshire and Monmouthshire
- Frequencies: FM: 106.2 MHz (Hereford); 107.0 MHz (Monmouth); 107.8 MHz (Abergavenny) & Online; DAB: 10C (Gloucestershire); 12A (Herefordshire and Worcestershire)
- RDS: SUN106.2 (Hereford); SUN107 (Monmouth) Sunshine (Abergavenny)

Programming
- Language: English
- Format: Adult Contemporary

Ownership
- Owner: Murfin Music International
- Sister stations: Sunshine Radio (Ludlow)

History
- First air date: 14 December 2007

Links
- Website: Sunshine Radio

Sunshine Radio is an Independent Local Radio station which broadcasts to Herefordshire and Monmouthshire, areas of the West Midlands and South Wales respectively from its studios in Hereford. It is operated by Murfin Media Ltd, and previously by Laser Broadcasting.

== History ==
Prior to launching the station had a working name of Classic Hits, and the licence application was in this name. Three months prior to the opening, the station rebranded to Sunshine Radio, the same name as the original Sunshine Radio in Ludlow.

The station launched on 14 December 2007. A five-minute audio clock was used as a lead in to the opening jingle and welcoming monologue from Station Manager and presenter Mark Edwards at exactly 7am. The station's launch song was 'Start' by The Jam followed by an interview with the then Mayor of Hereford City. A simultaneous Breakfast Show was broadcast across Monmouthshire by Paul Roberts with an interview with the town's Mayor during the same time period.

== Programming ==
According to the station's licence locally made hours consist of at least 10 hours a day during daytime weekdays which must include breakfast and at least 4 hours daytime Saturdays and Sundays and the station broadcasts music spanning the last four decades and local news bulletins which are aired hourly at peak time weekdays and weekends. Outside of this, national and international news is provided by IRN.

Presenters include Gary King.

== Technical ==
Sunshine Radio broadcasts to Herefordshire and Monmouthshire on 106.2 FM (Ridge Hill, between Ross-on-Wye and Ledbury near Much Marcle – for Herefordshire) 107.0 FM (Monmouth TV Relay for Monmouth) and 107.8 FM (Abergavenny TV Relay for Abergavenny). Although the station is for Herefordshire and Monmouthshire, the 106.2 frequency can be quite clearly heard in such places as Birmingham, Worcester, Gloucester and Bristol. The other 2 transmitters are quite low power and can just be heard outside their areas.

Sunshine Radio is also on the DAB Multiplex in Herefordshire, Worcestershire and Gloucestershire.

Sunshine broadcasts 1.6KW from Ridge Hill, 1KW from the Monmouth TV Relay and 250 watts from the Abergavenny TV Relay.

Another filler was planned for the Leominster area broadcasting on 107.8 FM, but plans were scrapped.

== See also ==
- Sunshine Radio (Ludlow)
- Sunshine 1530
