= Dales Radio =

Radio station in the Yorkshire Dales, England

- Broadcast from Settle; United Kingdom
- Broadcast area: Yorkshire Dales
- Frequencies: FM: 104.9 MHz (Grassington, Leyburn, Settle and Sedbergh); 103.0 MHz (Ingleton and Kirkby Stephen); AM: 936 kHz (Hawes)

Programming
- Format: Community

Ownership
- Owner: Dales Radio Limited

History
- First air date: 11 January 2016

Links
- Website: dalesradio.co.uk

Dales Radio is a community radio station broadcasting in the Yorkshire Dales in Northern England, to communities including Hawes, Sedbergh, Grassington, Settle, Ingleton and Leyburn. It is the biggest community radio station in the United Kingdom in terms of the extent of its broadcast area.

== History ==
Dales Radio launched on 11 January 2016, following the closure in 2012 of Fresh Radio, a commercial radio station covering the Yorkshire Dales area. A number of presenters and staff at Dales Radio were previously involved with Fresh Radio.

In 2021, the station began to expand its coverage across the Yorkshire Dales National Park. This involves installing new transmitter sites in unserved parts of the region. A new transmitter at Leyburn, on 104.9 FM, went live on 2 April 2021.

== People ==
Dales Radio is run by volunteers and the staff includes Chris Parkin (Managing Director/Chairman), Mike Long (Director/Station Manager), Rob Stevens (Programme Manager/Presenter), Lisa C (Social Media Manager/Community Coordinator) and Karen Douglas (The Voice of the Dales Diaries). Presenters: Nick Parton (Weekday Breakfast), Simon Doe (Weekday Mid-Mornings), Rob Stevens (Weekday Drivetime), Robbie Burns (Saturday Afternoons), Ian Wighton (Sunday Breakfast), Nadine (Sunday Roast), Dave Mac (The Retro Chart), Tiiu Shelley (Friday Night Classic Rock Show), Emma Scott (Friday Nights), Les Gunn and the Team (Sunday Late and Live).

== Programming ==
Dales Radio is a not-for-profit community radio station and aims to enhance the lives of those living in and visiting the Yorkshire Dales National Park. Much of the station's output consists of pop music and local information, with specialist music shows delivered during off-peak hours. The station's Key Commitments require it to deliver "reports on items of local interest, traffic and travel, weather, public service announcements, interviews and discussions".

== Transmission ==
Dales Radio broadcasts from an AM transmitter previously used by commercial radio station Fresh Radio. This transmits from a site in Hawes on a frequency of 936kHz with a power of 150 watts and coverage extends across the sparsely populated Yorkshire Dales National Park. The following FM transmitters are also used in populated parts of the region:

Location	Frequency	ERP (watts)
Grassington	104.9 MHz	50
Ingleton	103.0 MHz	100
Leyburn	104.9 MHz	50
Settle	104.9 MHz	50
Kirkby Stephen	103.0 Mhz	100
Sedbergh	104.9 Mhz	50

The station is licensed to broadcast on FM to the Hawes, Kirkby Stephen and Sedbergh areas and aims to expand into these areas as funds allow.
