= Radio Hafren =

Radio Hafren was an Independent Local Radio station in the United Kingdom, serving Mid Wales and the English border counties and broadcasting on 756 AM and 102.1 FM. It was officially launched on Christmas Day 2010 after its bid to take over the licence of Radio Maldwyn was accepted on 15 December 2010, initially broadcasting on only 756 AM.

On 11 August 2014, at 10:21am Radio Hafren started broadcasting on 102.1 FM to the two largest population centres (Newtown and Welshpool) in its coverage area, using a frequency allocated in 2011. On Wednesday 11 February 2015 Radio Hafren closed down because it was financially unviable.

== Origins of the station as Radio Maldwyn ==
Radio Maldwyn - The Magic 756
Wales
- Broadcast area: Mid Wales, western Shropshire, north western Herefordshire (approximately; signal is prominent in some areas of North East Wales)
- Frequency: 756 kHz AM/397 metres Medium Wave Band

Programming
- Format: Classic Hits

Ownership
- Owner: Murfin Music International/Community Co-Operative

History
- First air date: Thursday, 1 July 1993
- Last air date: 25 December 2010

Technical information
- Transmitter coordinates: 52.5168°N 3.2770°W

Links
- Website: http://www.magic756.net

Radio Maldwyn - The Magic 756 was an Independent Local Radio station serving Mid Wales and the English border counties, with a transmitter site is based a few miles outside of Newtown, Powys.

The station began broadcasting at 07.56 am on Thursday, 1 July 1993. The original station manager and programme controller was John Barnes; the original sales manager was Lisa Price.

Live programmes initially ran between 0700 - 1900, with the Supergold service from the Chiltern Radio Network overnight. The station increased local hours to 2100 a few months after going on air. Maldwyn was the only station outside the Chiltern-owned stations that made full use of the automation service available on Supergold to insert local news, commercials and features within network programming. Maldwyn broadcast the Network News service provided by Chiltern Radio before switching to IRN when Network News closed.

Originally a local station formed as a community co-operative, Radio Maldwyn became a Limited Company in the late 1990s, with original shareholders having 51% of the new company and 49% owned by Murfin Music International, owners of Sunshine 855 in Ludlow, South Shropshire and Sunshine FM in Hereford and Monmouth.

It was decided that in November 2010 the station was to close; it was replaced by Radio Hafren.

== Operations from 2010 to 2015 ==
Based in Newtown, Powys, in the primarily rural setting of Mid Wales, the station's 756 AM Frequency had an extensive broadcasting range including parts of North Wales, Shropshire, Cheshire, and Worcestershire. Between Midnight and 2am, the output switched to a selection of programmes featuring new and unsigned artists from the internet only station Celtica Radio.
