= Heart West =

Radio station in South West England

- Bristol; United Kingdom
- Broadcast area: South West of England
- Frequencies: FM: Bristol and Somerset: 96.3 (Bristol, North Somerset and South Gloucestershire); 96.5 (Taunton); 97.1 (South Somerset); 102.6 (Somerset); 103.0 (Weston-super-Mare, Burnham-on-Sea and Bath); Devon: 96.2 (Barnstaple); 96.4 (Torbay); 96.6 (Tavistock); 97.0 (Plymouth and Exeter); 97.3 (Ilfracombe); 100.5 (Totnes); 100.8 (Dartmouth); 101.2 (Salcombe); 101.9 (Ivybridge); 103.0 (East Devon); Cornwall: 105.1 (Liskeard and Launceston); 107.0 (Redruth); Gloucestershire: 102.4 (Gloucester, Cirencester and Cheltenham); 103.0 (Stroud); Wiltshire: 96.5 (Marlborough); 97.2 (Swindon); 102.2 (Chippenham) DAB: 10B (Somerset and parts of Devon); 10C (Gloucestershire); 10C (North Devon); 10D (Bath and West Wiltshire); 11B (Bristol and Bath and Cornwall); 11C (South Devon); 11C (Swindon); 12D (Plymouth and Saltash)
- Branding: This is Heart

Programming
- Format: Hot Adult Contemporary
- Network: Heart

Ownership
- Owner: Global

History
- First air date: 3 June 2019

Links
- Website: Heart Barnstaple; Heart Bath; Heart Bristol; Heart Cornwall; Heart Exeter; Heart Gloucestershire; Heart Plymouth; Heart Somerset; Heart South Hams; Heart Torbay; Heart Wiltshire

Heart West is a regional radio station owned and operated by Global as part of the Heart network. It broadcasts in South West England.

The station launched on 3 June 2019, following a merger of four Heart stations in Bristol and Somerset, Devon and Cornwall, Gloucestershire and Wiltshire.

== History ==
Under relaxed OFCOM requirements for local content on commercial radio, Heart West is permitted to share all programmes between nine licences located in the ITV West Country broadcast region (formerly consisting of separate areas for the West and the South West of England).

Previously, these licences broadcast as separate stations:

- The first Independent Local Radio station to launch in the region was Plymouth Sound, which began broadcasting in May 1975 to the city and its surrounding areas.
- Severn Sound began broadcasting to Gloucestershire in October 1980.
- Radio West began broadcasting to Bristol, Bath, Weston-super-Mare and surrounding areas in October 1981.
- Wiltshire Radio began broadcasting from Wootton Bassett in October 1982, serving Wiltshire.
- Orchard FM began broadcasting from Taunton in November 1989, serving Somerset.
- Lantern FM began broadcasting to North Devon in October 1992, initially from studios in Bideford before moving to Barnstaple in 2000.
- Gemini FM began broadcasting in January 1995, after taking over the licence for East Devon previously held by DevonAir. The twin station carried separate programming for the Exeter and Torbay areas.
- South Hams Radio began broadcasting in December 1999, serving South Devon.
- Atlantic FM began broadcasting from St Agnes in July 2006, serving Cornwall.

In 1985, after suffering heavy financial losses since its launch, Radio West was approached by the successful Wiltshire Radio for a merger - the first of its kind in commercial radio in the UK. This was approved by the IBA (Independent Broadcasting Authority) and the two stations combined to form GWR in October 1985.

GWR continued to provide separate programming for the Bristol and Swindon areas, and in May 1987, a third opt-out service for Bath was launched. The station's owners, GWR Group plc, went onto become one of the major commercial radio operators in the UK.

Orchard FM in Somerset expanded its operations with Gemini FM winning the East Devon ILR licence from DevonAir and the acquisition of Lantern FM in North Devon.

The Orchard Radio Group was itself brought by GWR in 1999, but in November 2005, these stations - along with Plymouth Sound - were put up for sale by GCap Media as they were considered outside of the company's primary target area. In the event, the sale did not go ahead as all of the bids made fell short of expectations. In 2008, the group was taken over by Global, which eventually took ownership of South Hams Radio as a joint venture with the UKRD Group.

In March 2009, Global rebranded Gemini, Lantern FM, Orchard FM, Plymouth Sound, South Hams Radio, Severn Sound and the GWR stations as part of a rollout of the Heart network across 29 local radio stations. By this point, local programming had been reduced to ten hours on weekdays and four hours at weekends.

During the summer of 2010, Global merged seven of the stations to two:

- Heart Devon - formed from the Exeter & Torbay, Plymouth, South Devon and North Devon stations, broadcasting from Exeter
- Heart West Country - formed from the Bristol, Bath and Somerset stations, broadcasting from Bristol

Heart Gloucestershire and Heart Wiltshire retained local programming, but the stations' newsgathering operations were moved to Bristol. Local programming was further cut to seven hours on weekdays, although localised news bulletins, traffic updates and advertising continued to air as opt-outs.

In March 2012, Global brought Atlantic FM from joint owners Tindle Radio and Camel Media. Two months later, the station merged with Heart Devon to form Heart South West and moved its studios to Exeter. A separate Drivetime show for Cornwall was retained, and in 2014, an extended news programme, Heart Nightly News, was introduced.

On 26 February 2019, following OFCOM's decision to relax local content obligations from commercial radio, Global announced it would merge the four South West stations into one.

From 3 June 2019, regional programming consisted of a three-hour Drivetime show on weekdays, alongside localised opt-outs for news bulletins, traffic updates and advertising. Local breakfast and weekend shows were replaced with network programming from London.

Global's studio centres in Exeter, Gloucester and Wootton Bassett were closed, although local newsgathering and sales staff were retained. Across the four stations, eighteen local presenters left the Heart network.

As of 24 February 2025 all programming originates from Global's London headquarters, including Heart Drive, presented each weekday by JK and Kelly Brook.

== News ==
Localised hourly news bulletins for Bristol & Somerset, Devon, Cornwall, Gloucestershire and Wiltshire air from 6am-7pm on weekdays and 6am-12pm on weekends.

In Cornwall, an extended local news programme, Heart Nightly News, previously aired at 6.45pm each weeknight as part of the weekday Drivetime show. In March 2021, Global was given permission by Ofcom to reduce speech content on several Heart licences, allowing Heart to drop the Nightly News strand from those stations in the network which had previously carried it. Global cited research which indicated that a large proportion of radio listeners in Cornwall were unaware of the Nightly News bulletin.
