= Swindon FM =

England
- Broadcast area: Swindon, England
- Frequency: 107 MHz

Programming
- Format: Local DAB Radio

History
- First air date: September 2001
- Last air date: May 2006
- Former names: Swindon 107FM

Swindon FM (formerly Swindon 107FM) was a local DAB radio station broadcasting to the English town of Swindon between 2003 and 2006, after making two trial FM broadcasts in 2001 and 2002. The station stopped broadcasting in May 2006.

Towards the end of its tenure, the station's owners applied to the regulators for a local commercial licence, which was awarded to Brunel FM, and for a community radio licence, which went to Swindon 105.5. As a result, many of its staff and presenters moved to those rival stations.

== History ==
=== Swindon 107FM (2001–2002) ===
Swindon 107FM broadcast its first Restricted Service Licence (RSL) transmission from a studio at Swindon's Brunel Centre shopping complex in September 2001. The station was founded by former Swindon Town chairman Rikki Hunt and jazz musician Ray Butt, who felt a need for new station in the area where GWR FM Wiltshire had for many years been the only commercial station, along with BBC Wiltshire Sound (now BBC Radio Wiltshire). Their target audience was aged 25–55, and the station played popular artists from the 1950s to the present day that catered for their audience, including local artists with specialist music shows, which the area had been lacking, as well as a local news service.

Another RSL transmission was broadcast in June and July 2002, focusing more on local talent to present the station's programming.

=== Swindon FM (2003–2006) ===
In 2003, Swindon FM began broadcasting from new studios at Old Town Court as a DAB-only station – the first local station of its kind in the United Kingdom. Swindon FM broadcast at first on Saturdays and Sundays between 6am and 10pm before expanding to a full seven days-a-week service later in the year – an event marked by a weekend-long countdown of one hundred songs voted for by the public. Other feature programming on the station included The What's On Guide and The Winning Weekend.

The launch of a DAB station (by now, run completely by volunteers) also marked a change in Swindon FM's target audience to 35-years and over, concentrating on the older range of the scale.

In 2005, Swindon FM applied to Ofcom for a local FM licence, and at this time GWR-FM's parent company, GCap, invested in a 20% share of Swindon FM. Following a successful campaign to prove there was an audience for a second commercial radio licence for Swindon, Swindon FM ultimately lost out to another group, Now FM (who began broadcasting as Brunel FM and were owned by The Local Radio Company).

=== Closure ===
At 2pm on Friday 12 May 2006, the station ceased transmission after running into difficulties with its premises, leaving Swindon FM homeless. At the end of the year, the team behind Swindon FM applied for a Community Radio licence but lost out to Swindon 105.5.
