= Radio Plymouth =

Radio station in Devon, England

Coordinates: 50.3678°N 4.1473°W

Greatest Hits Radio Plymouth
- Plymouth; England
- Broadcast area: Plymouth and Saltash
- Frequencies: FM: 106.7 MHz; DAB: 12D

Programming
- Format: Classic Hits
- Network: Greatest Hits Radio

Ownership
- Owner: Bauer

History
- First air date: 28 February 2010
- Former names: Radio Plymouth

Links
- Website: Greatest Hits Radio

Radio Plymouth was an Independent Local Radio station serving Plymouth, Devon in England.

The station was folded into Greatest Hits Radio South West, as part of a rebrand, on 1 November 2020.

== History ==
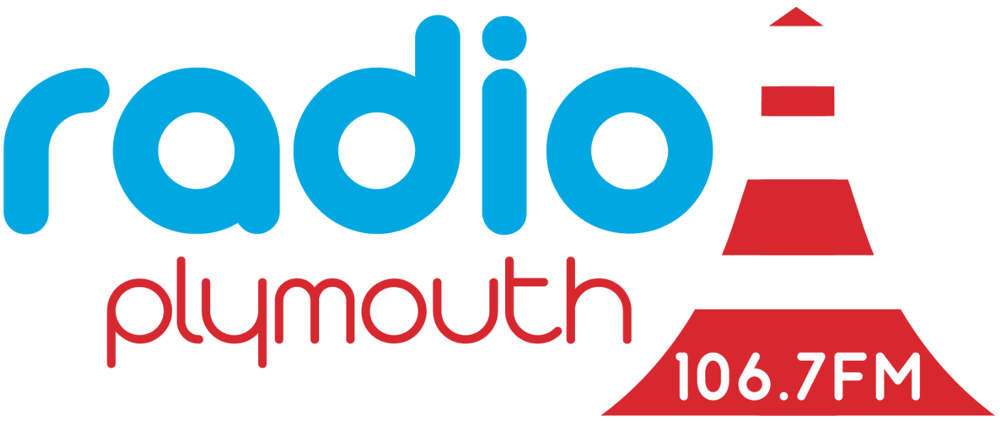
Final logo used up until rebrand.

Radio Plymouth was launched at 10am on Sunday 28 February 2010 by television presenter Phillip Schofield, an investor in the station. The first song played was The Way It Is by Bruce Hornsby and the Range.

Five companies applied in December 2005 for the licence to broadcast in Plymouth. It was won in March 2006 by a London company, Macquarie, under the name Diamond FM. The station failed to launch and the licence was given back to OFCOM. Two companies applied and Radio Plymouth won against UKRD's plan to extend its existing station, Pirate FM. The licence was one of the last to be granted by Ofcom during the final round of commercial licence awards.

Until 17 September 2020, Radio Plymouth was 100% owned by individuals through Radio Plymouth Limited. The licence covered Plymouth, which has a population aged 15 and older of 250,000.

== Closure ==
On 17 September 2020, Radio Plymouth announced its acquisition by Bauer with their intentions of using Radio Plymouth's business assets to expand the Greatest Hits Radio network.

Local programmes ended at 1100 hrs GMT on 1 November 2020. Radio Plymouth is now folded into the Greatest Hits Radio South West network of radio stations.
