= South West Radio =

British radio broadcasting company

SouthWest Radio Ltd (or SWR) owned and operated radio stations in Wiltshire and Somerset in the South West of England. The company was founded in 2008 and was based in Exeter, Devon in the United Kingdom.

== Stations owned ==
- Bath FM which served Bath.
- Brunel FM which served Swindon/North Wiltshire.
- QuayWest 107.4 which served Bridgwater.
- QuayWest 102.4fm which served West Somerset.
- 107.5 3TR FM which served Warminster, Westbury & Frome.

== History ==
In early August 2009, South West Radio went into administration after it was declared insolvent, less than a year after Bath FM's previous owner, Laser Broadcasting, went under. Insolvency practitioners Kirk Hills were put in charge of looking for a buyer in order to safeguard the stations' futures.

The owner of another local radio group, Star Radio Cheltenham, took the licences over and rebranded to Total Star.
