= Heart West Country =

Coordinates: 51.45395°N 2.58586°W

Bristol; England
- Broadcast area: Bristol, Somerset, Bath, West Dorset and Wiltshire
- Frequencies: FM: Bristol North Somerset and South Gloucestershire: 96.3 (Bristol, Yate, Nailsea, Keynsham, Portishead and Thornbury), Somerset; 96.5 (Taunton); 97.1 (Crewkerne, Chard & Beaminster); 102.6 (Somerset, South and West Dorset and South Wales); 103.0 (Weston-super-Mare, Stroud and Bath); Wiltshire; 96.5 (Marlborough); 97.2 (Swindon and Witney); 102.2 (Chippenham Corsham, Melksham, Trowbridge, Calne); DAB: 11C Arqiva Swindon and Witney; DAB: 11B Arqiva Bristol; DAB: 11B Arqiva Bath; DAB: 10B MuxCo North Somerset & South Somerset DAB: 10D: NOW Digital West Wiltshire and Bath,
- Branding: This is Heart

Programming
- Format: Hot Adult Contemporary

Ownership
- Owner: Global

History
- First air date: 16 July 2010
- Last air date: 3 June 2019

Links
- Website: Heart West Country

Heart West Country was a regional radio station owned and operated by Global Radio as part of the Heart network, broadcasting to Bristol and Somerset.

It launched on 16 July 2010 as a result of a merger between Heart Bristol (formerly GWR FM), Heart Bath (formerly GWR FM Bath) and Heart Somerset (formerly Orchard FM).

== History ==
The regional station originally broadcast as three separate stations – GWR FM began broadcasting to Bristol in October 1985, following a merger between Radio West and Swindon's Wiltshire Radio. Two years later, GWR launched a separate service for the Bath area (although some local programming was simulcast with GWR Bristol). Meanwhile, Orchard FM began broadcasting to Somerset in November 1989 – the station was bought out by GWR Group as part of its acquisition of the Orchard Media Group ten years later.

In 2005, the GWR Group merged with Capital Radio to form GCap Media – shortly afterwards, Orchard FM and ten other stations (outside of the company's primary target area) were put on sale. The sale was called off a few months later because of lower than expected bids. In November 2008, GCap was taken over by Global Radio.

GWR in Bristol & Bath and Orchard FM were rebranded as Heart on 23 March 2009. On 21 June 2010, Global Radio announced it would merge the three stations as part of plans to reduce the Heart network of stations from 33 to 16. The new station began broadcasting from the 'West Country Broadcast Centre' in Bristol on Friday 16 July 2010, leading to the closure of studios in Taunton.

=== Station merger ===
On 26 February 2019, Global announced Heart West Country would be merged with three sister stations in Devon and Cornwall, Gloucestershire and Wiltshire.

From 3 June 2019, local output will consist of a three-hour regional Drivetime show on weekdays, alongside localised news bulletins, traffic updates and advertising. Local breakfast and weekend shows were with network programming from London.

Heart West began broadcasting regional programming from the Bristol studios on 3 June 2019.
