= Absolute Radio Extra =

Coordinates: 51.512248°N 0.136937°W

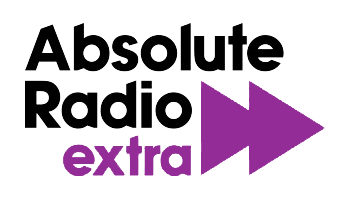

London; United Kingdom
- Broadcast area: United Kingdom: National (AM); National (DAB)
- Frequencies: 1215 kHz, AM Variants (Digital One) – 11D (England & Wales) – 12A (Scotland); Sky: 0107
- Branding: Absolute.

Programming
- Format: Part-time live football and concerts

Ownership
- Owner: Bauer Radio
- Sister stations: Absolute Radio; Absolute Radio Classic Rock; Absolute Radio 60s Absolute Radio 70s Absolute Radio 80s Absolute Radio 90s Absolute Radio 00s Absolute Radio 10s

History
- First air date: 16 July 2010 – 2012

Links
- Website: web.archive.org/web/20110728111055/http://www.absoluteradioextra.co.uk:80/

Absolute Radio Extra was a part-time radio service similar to BBC Radio 5 Live Sports Extra. The station was launched to broadcast the live coverage of the Premier League Games under the Rock n Roll Football brand, also broadcast on the main Absolute station and Absolute Radio 90s. The station also used to broadcast live and pre-recorded uninterrupted sets from artists and bands under the Absolute Radio Live brand, In 2010 the station broadcast live sets from festivals such as V Festival. Also comedy sets are broadcast by Frank Skinner and Dave Gorman. When off air on DAB, 'Absolute R Extra' pointed listeners to Absolute Radio 90s.

== Presenters ==
- Russ Williams – Saturday 1.30pm – 3pm
- Jim Proudfoot Saturday 3pm – 5pm
- Ian Wright – Saturday 5pm – 6.30pm

== Frequencies ==
Absolute Radio Extra is available on Saturday afternoons on Absolute Radio's AM Frequencies between 1.30 and 6.30 In a number of areas, particularly in areas where the signal from the main 1215 transmitters overlap with each other, Absolute Radio Extra operates a number of filler transmitters on different frequencies :-

- 1197 kHz – Brighton and Hove, Cambridge, South Devon, Dorset, South Essex, Gloucester, Oxford, Nottingham and Derby, Medway, Merseyside
- 1233 kHz – Berkshire, North Essex, Northampton, Sheffield, Swindon, Gatwick
- 1242 kHz – Teesside, Dundee, Peterborough and Lincoln and around the Wash (Boston transmitter), North Staffordshire and South Cheshire (Stoke)
- 1260 kHz – Guildford, East Kent

== Absolute Radio 90s ==
The sister station Absolute Radio 90s simulcasts on Absolute Radio Extra's frequencies, when the station is off air.
