= Atlantic FM =

- Cornwall; United Kingdom
- Frequencies: 105.1 and 107.0 MHz

Programming
- Format: AC

Ownership
- Owner: Global Radio

History
- First air date: 6 July 2006
- Last air date: 6 May 2012

Atlantic FM was an Independent Local Radio station serving Cornwall. Original staff included MD Jim Trevelyan, PC Mark Chapple, and News Editor Jamie Reed. Plus 4 news reporters, 4 presenters, 6 sales people, a station coordinator, plus freelance staff. The station began broadcasting at 7:30am on 6 July 2006 by Mark Chapple and broadcast from studios at St Agnes. The station, aimed at 25- to 54-year-olds, mainly played Adult Contemporary music with national & local news and information, including surf reports for Cornish towns and locations including Newquay & Polzeath on the North Cornwall coast, and Whitsand Bay on the South Cornwall coast.

On 19 March 2012, it was announced that Global Radio had bought the station from joint owners Tindle Radio and Camel Media.

The station became part of the Heart Network and merged with Heart Devon on 7 May 2012 to form Heart South West. Local breakfast and drive programming is broadcast from Heart's Exeter studios with a sales office based at Atlantic's former studios at St Agnes.
