= Swindon 105.5 =

- Logo used since 2015
- England
- Broadcast area: Swindon, England
- Frequencies: 105.5 MHz & DAB (Swindon & Marlborough Multiplex)

Programming
- Format: Community Radio

Ownership
- Owner: Community Radio Swindon Limited

History
- First air date: March 15, 2008; 18 years ago

Links
- Website: www.swindon1055.co.uk

Swindon 105.5 is a not-for-profit community radio station based in Swindon, England, launched in March 2008. The station manager is former BBC Wiltshire Sound, GWR FM and Swindon Viewpoint presenter, Shirley Ludford. Aside from Shirley being paid part-time, the station is run entirely by volunteers. Shirley also dedicates many voluntary hours each week. The station obtains its funding from grants, donations, fundraising events, training courses and limited on-air sponsorship.

The station has received numerous awards for its programmes and general service to the community of Swindon. It was presented the Queen's Award for Voluntary Service by Prince Edward, the Duke of Kent in October 2014, the highest award available to a voluntary group. Patrons of the service include Lord Joel Joffe (now deceased), Whoopi Goldberg, Simon May and Boyzone's Shane Lynch.

== History ==
=== Beginnings ===
The original project was founded in 2004 by Ian Rowe, Johnny Robinson and Shirley Ludford, along with Richard Grace and Greg Stevens who had all met previously working at local station Swindon FM. They continued to work together, forming a new group. Ludford was a former employee of both BBC Wiltshire Sound and GWR FM. She was subsequently appointed station manager of the project.

Prior to the launch of the full-time station, Swindon Community Broadcasting, a Restricted Service Licence station, was set up in order to discover whether a community radio station could work in the area. Broadcasts took place from The Bulldog pub in Swindon. After positive feedback throughout the four-week broadcast, it was decided the project would proceed to the next step and apply for a full-time community radio licence from Ofcom.

In 2006, two groups applied for the community radio licence for the Swindon area: Swindon FM, which had run a local DAB-only service in Swindon in 2002, and Community Radio Swindon, broadcasting as Swindon 105.5. Ofcom decided in favour of Community Radio Swindon and the station was awarded its licence in February 2007. Some of Swindon FM's presenters moved to or have subsequently moved to Swindon 105.5.

=== Launch ===
The station's first studio was at the County Ground, home of Swindon Town F.C., and was for a short time shared with ITV Thames Valley. The inaugural show on 15 March 2008 was presented by Shirley Ludford with a former broadcasting colleague from BBC Wiltshire Sound, Peter Heaton-Jones. The station’s first officially played song was the 1964 Martha and The Vandellas single "Dancing in the Street". The original music database was developed by the station's head of music and co-founder, Johnny Robinson. The first regular show to air was The Johnny Robinson Show at 7–9 pm on Saturday 15 March. Robinson was apparently "tired and shattered" after helping with preparations for the launch, and had gone without sleep for 36 hours before presenting the show. The event was attended by a senior member of Ofcom.

=== Further expansion ===
In the summer of 2010, the station moved premises, relocating near to Stratton Road at the Bentley Centre, Stratton Road, due to the need for more space to cope with demand for training. The move to much larger premises allowed the station to expand to three studios and to have large administration and training areas. Shirley Ludford ran the first accredited radio course for nine-year-olds at Drove Primary School in 2011, making them the youngest in the country to gain this certificate. The station's transmitter was moved to the top of the 90 metres (300 ft) high David Murray John building in the centre of Swindon on 15 March 2013, on the station's fifth birthday.

Shirley Ludford was featured in the 2014 Mothers' Day edition of ITV's Surprise Surprise programme which saw Boyzone visit the station, with Ludford also visiting New York to meet Whoopi Goldberg. She was selected to appear on the show due to her long-term work for the Swindon community. Ludford received the High Sheriff's Award for long service to the community in February 2014, and later in the year The Duke Of Kent visited the station to present the Queen's Award for Voluntary Service in November 2014. Dave Woods was nominated for his programme, Europe: Does it Matter to Swindon?, in the Current Affairs Documentary category at the Radio Academy’s fifth annual Radio Production Awards. Three station music presenters received music awards.

Due to conversion of the Bentley Centre into flats, the station moved to its third and current home, former office space at Liden Library, in January 2016. This move saw expansion into studios of a similar size to that of their previous location, with three studios and a large space for administration and training purposes. The studios' close proximity to Liden's library, community centre and village has enabled it to host numerous local events and promotional opportunities.

== Legacy ==
The station manager was influential in changing legislation to allow community radio stations in the United Kingdom to receive limited advertising and commercial sponsorship to support their operations; on-air commercial activity was previously banned on community radio stations. Minister for Culture Ed Vaizey visited Swindon 105.5 in December 2012 and July 2014, and with support from local MP Robert Buckland, Shirley Ludford was invited to present the case at the House of Commons to encourage a relaxation of restrictions. Legislation in March 2015 allowed Ofcom to make community radio licence conditions which permitted stations to seek a specific percentage of their income through on-air commercial activity, namely sponsored programmes and advertising.

== See also ==
- Swindon FM
- BBC Radio Wiltshire
