= Sunshine Radio (Ludlow) =

Coordinates: 52.3766°N 2.7240°W

- Ludlow; England
- Broadcast area: South Shropshire, north Herefordshire and north Worcestershire
- Frequencies: FM: 105.9 MHz South Shropshire and North Herefordshire (Woofferton); 107.8 MHz North Worcestershire and South Shropshire (Clee Hill) & Online
- RDS: Sunshine

Programming
- Format: Adult Contemporary

Ownership
- Owner: Murfin Music International
- Sister stations: Sunshine Radio (Hereford)

History
- First air date: 18 October 1992 (31 years ago)
- Former frequencies: AM: 855 kHz

Links
- Website: Sunshine Radio Ludlow

Sunshine Radio (Ludlow) is an Independent Local Radio station based in Ludlow, Shropshire.

== Former ==
- 855 kHz AM – Villa Farm, between Ludlow and Tenbury Wells

Before obtaining a license in 1992, Sunshine had a very successful period as a pirate station the in 1980s.

The station ended transmissions on MW on 19 January 2024, after permission was granted by Ofcom on the grounds of the expensive cost of maintaining the transmitters and the small number of listeners who listen on mediumwave.

== See also ==
- Sunshine Radio (Herefordshire and Monmouthshire)
- Sunshine 1530
