= Original 106.5 (Bristol) =

England
- Broadcast area: Bristol
- Frequencies: 106.5 MHz, Online

Programming
- Format: Adult Oriented

Ownership
- Owner: Tomahawk Radio

History
- First air date: 20 May 2007
- Last air date: 2 December 2009

Links
- Website: www.originalbristol.com

Original 106.5 was an Independent Local Radio station that broadcast to Bristol, England between 20 May 2007 and 1 December 2009. The station management was Tom Hunter as MD and Stewart Smith as Programme Director. Following a change of format request which was granted by Ofcom, the station was relaunched bearing the Jack FM brand, as 106 Jack FM, at 6:00 am on 2 December 2009.

== History ==
It was awarded its original broadcast licence in September 2006, and commenced broadcasting on 20 May 2007. It is owned by a group of investors under the name Tomahawk Radio. The station originally broadcast an Adult Oriented format, with 40% of its music coming from past or present Top 20 charts. On 2 March 2009, Tomahawk Radio, the owners of Bristol's Original 106.5 purchased another radio station in the city. 'Bristol's Star Radio' (Star 107.2). Both stations were located together in the County Gates building on Ashton Road, Bristol.

== Music ==
Original 106.5 played a mix of hit singles from a full range of adult orientated genres including rock, pop, soul from the 60s to today.

== News and sport ==
Original 106.5 broadcast regular round-the-clock news bulletins from their studios in Bristol.

== Audience figures ==
Original 106.5 maintained a weekly reach of 24,000 listeners, equivalent to 4% in their TSA (RAJAR Q3 2008), which was the third quarter in a row the station has seen listeners increase.

== See also ==
- Star 107.2
