= Needle time =

UK restriction on music broadcast

Needle time was created in the United Kingdom by the Musicians' Union and Phonographic Performance Limited to restrict the amount of recorded music that could be transmitted by the British Broadcasting Corporation (BBC) during any 24-hour period. The number of hours per week allowed gradually increased over the years from below 30 hours in the 1950s. Until 1967 the BBC was allowed to play only five hours per day of commercial gramophone records on the air. It continued to affect BBC Radio 1, BBC Radio 2 and the Independent Local Radio stations until 1988.

The result was that the BBC had to use "cover" versions of popular songs by groups such as Shane Fenton and the Fentones recorded at the BBC studios, or orchestral versions by one of the in-house orchestras, to fill in the hours.

The term "needle time" comes from the use (at the time) of gramophone records as the main source of recorded music, which were played on gramophone record players using a gramophone needle.

== Needle time notice ==
British records at the time carried a warning message around the edge of the record label in the centre of the record itself to the effect that: "Unauthorised public performance or broadcasting of this record is strictly prohibited."

=== Radio Luxembourg ===
Although the record industry in Britain wanted the public to buy its records, it had to give them some airtime so that the public could find out about their existence. To that end the record industry used the commercial nighttime signals from Radio Luxembourg whose powerful AM signal could be heard in the UK. The "208" shows on Luxembourg were mainly fifteen minutes to thirty minutes in length and presented under names such as the Decca Records Show or the Capitol Records Show. These prerecorded programmes resembled what later became known as infomercials, because they normally only featured a little over half of the record, with heavy plugging for title, artist and label.

Because all the hours of transmission were booked up by the major record companies (EMI, Decca, Pye, Philips etc.) groups and artists had to sign to them to get any exposure. This was one of the driving forces for Ronan O'Rahilly and others to start the first pirate radio station to get exposure for artists he represented.

=== The "pirate stations" ===
Unlike the BBC or Radio Luxembourg, the offshore pirate radio stations of the 1960s operated not only outside the three-mile limit of territorial waters, but also in a grey area of the law. Because the studios and transmitters were located on board the ships or offshore structures, the personnel on board were only under the authority of the captain of that ship or structure. In the case of ship stations, such as Wonderful Radio London which introduced top 40 radio to Britain, the ship was registered in a foreign country and therefore subject to the laws of that country, which did not recognise "needle time". Payola operated on several of these stations.

== See also ==
- International Federation of the Phonographic Industry#History – a history of attempts by the record industry to claim a separate right to ownership of recorded works.
