= Sunshine 1530 =

- England
- Broadcast area: Herefordshire and Worcestershire
- Frequencies: 954 & 1530 AM

Programming
- Format: Contemporary

Ownership
- Owner: Murfin Music International

History
- First air date: 4 October 1982
- Last air date: 6 April 2010

Sunshine 1530 (formerly Sunshine Gold, Sunshine Radio, Classic Hits 954 & 1530, Classic Gold 954/1530 AM, Wyvern AM and Radio Wyvern) was an Independent Local Radio station which broadcast to Herefordshire and Worcestershire on 1530 and 954 kHz Medium Wave from studios in Worcester, England.

== History ==
The station started life as Radio Wyvern on both FM and AM in 1982. On 5 February 1996 the station split into Wyvern FM, playing newer music, and Wyvern AM which was essentially a gold service. The AM station was then rebranded as Classic Gold to fit in with the rest of the group's AM stations. Soon afterwards, it was sold to Muff Murfin of Murfin Music International as the station overlapped with neighbouring Classic Gold 774 in Gloucestershire. Some time later, it was rebranded as Classic Hits, and became a full-fledged local service with no links to either Wyvern FM or the Classic Gold network.

In 2007, Laser Broadcasting relaunched the station as Sunshine Radio. After Laser went bust, it was purchased by Murfin Media.

On 6 April 2010, it was announced that the station would close following a failed transfer of ownership details.

Presenters at the time of closure included Steve Heywood, Nigel Snow, Dave Webb, Paul Masters and Liam Cash.

The studios remained in operation subsequently at the original site in Cotheridge, Worcester, serving as backup studios for the remaining Sunshine Radio stations in Worcestershire, Shropshire and Herefordshire and Monmouthshire. The original transmission mast was later demolished. The Transmitter building itself still stands adjacent to the studio building, however the transmitter has since been sold and removed.

== See also ==
- Sunshine Radio (Herefordshire and Monmouthshire)
- Sunshine Radio (Ludlow)
