= Heart Somerset =

Radio station in Somerset, England

Coordinates: 50°59′50″N 3°05′02″W

- Taunton, Crewkerne, Chard, Burnham-on-Sea and Weston-super-Mare; England
- Broadcast area: Somerset
- Frequencies: 96.5, 97.1 102.6 and 103 MHz

Programming
- Format: Hot AC

Ownership
- Owner: Global Radio

History
- First air date: 26 November 1989
- Last air date: 16 July 2010

Heart Somerset (formerly Somerset's Orchard FM) was an Independent Local Radio station serving Somerset, England. Originally owned by (and officially remains licensed to) Orchard Media Ltd, the company was purchased by GWR Group in 1999, and subsequently became owned by GCap Media in 2005. Somerset's Orchard FM (later Heart Somerset) broadcast from studios at Haygrove House (a converted farmhouse and grounds) at Shoreditch near Taunton Racecourse, Taunton, adjacent to the M5.

== History ==
In November 2005 it was announced that GCap's local radio stations in the South West, including Orchard FM, were to be sold. This is because they were outside of the company's primary target area. This sale was called off in Spring 2006 because the bids received were much lower than hoped.

2008 saw the takeover of GCap Media by Global Radio. On 20 January 2009, it was announced that Orchard FM, along with 11 other stations in Southern England, would be rebranded as Heart on 23 March 2009.

Presenters on the station over the years included Bob McCreadie (later Pirate FM and Radio Plymouth), Phil Easton, Steve Bulley (now at Wessex FM), Jennie Gow (now presenter of MotoGP for the BBC), Steve Carpenter (now Radio Ninesprings), Chris Criddle (now Thornbury Radio), Jon White (now The Breeze), Mike Harwood, Dave Hills, Dan Jennings, Alex James, Tim Ley, Gregory Steven's, Dave Gould, Robert D'Ovidio (now Capital 95.8), Jeremy Kyle, Ian Burrage, Laura James (now The Breeze), Matt Bown (later BBC Southwest) and Ben Clark. Newsreaders included Rachel Hart, Lindsey Ashwood, Dominic Cotter (now BBC Radio Oxford), Greg Bown (now Radio Ninesprings), Angus Walker, Nicola Maxey, Darren Bevan, Helen Martin and Lisa Hay (later BBC Southwest, Mike Marsh. Black Thunder was the name given to Orchard FM's promotional team and their heavily branded 4x4 vehicles based at the Taunton studios, staffed by presenters including Laura James and Matt Bown along with promotional staff Becci Balliston, Matt Burd, Jodi Peppin, Becky Rayfield, Jemma Crook and thunder biker Simon Clark.

== Network restructuring ==
On 21 June 2010, Global Radio announced plans to close Heart Somerset and merge the station with Heart Bristol and Heart Bath as part of plans to reduce the Heart network of stations from 33 to 16. The final local programme was broadcast on Friday 16 July 2010 by long-standing breakfast presenters Ian Burrage and Laura James. The new station, Heart West Country, began broadcasting from Bristol on the same date.

== Transmitters ==
The main frequency is on 102.6 MHz FM from the Mendip TV Mast. This is at 4 kW, mixed polarisation. The signal is highly directional, with the maximum ERP only being radiated to the south and into Somerset in order to prevent a coverage and thus programming overlap with Heart from Bristol.

Other frequencies are 97.1 MHz FM from Chedington (near Crewkerne), which is at 400 watts, but again directional in order to prevent interference with nearby Wessex FM from the Dorchester area, which broadcasts on 97.2 MHz FM. This transmitter exists to reinforce coverage in the Yeovil, North Dorset and South Somerset areas.

96.5 MHz FM radiates from a 60 watt transmitter located in the grounds of the converted farm at Shoreditch in Taunton, from which Orchard FM and Heart Somerset were based. This transmitter reinforces signal in the Taunton area.
