= Heart Bath =

Coordinates: 51°22′42″N 2°21′27″W

- Bristol; England
- Broadcast area: Bath
- Frequencies: FM: 103 MHz, DAB: NOW Wiltshire; Online

Programming
- Format: Hot AC

Ownership
- Owner: Global Radio

History
- First air date: (as GWR Radio Bath) 22 May 1987
- Last air date: 16 July 2010

Heart 103 (formerly GWR Radio Bath and GWR FM Bath) was an Independent Local Radio station serving Bath in Somerset, England, broadcasting on 103 MHz FM, on DAB Digital radio and online.

== History ==
In 1986, a Bath ILR licence was awarded by the IBA. GWR Radio Bath first broadcast on 22 May 1987.

In its latter years, the station played Hot adult contemporary, ranging from the early 1980s to the current successful chart hits. The station was rebranded on 23 March 2009 in line with the rebranding by Global Radio of most of the One Network.

Up until its closure, the station shared some of its programming with Heart Bristol. However, for official licensing purposes Heart Bath and Bristol were listed as one station and audience figures from RAJAR are combined with Heart Wiltshire.

=== Network restructuring ===
On 21 June 2010, Global Radio announced plans to close Heart Bath and merge the station with Heart Bristol and Heart Somerset as part of plans to reduce the Heart network of stations from 33 to 16. The new station, Heart West Country, began broadcasting from Bristol on 16 July 2010.

== See also ==
- GCap Media
