= Heart Bristol =

Radio station in Bristol, North Somerset and South Gloucestershire

Bristol North Somerset South Gloucestershire; England
- Broadcast area: Bristol and surrounding areas
- Frequencies: FM: 96.3 MHz, 103.0 MHz; RDS Name: HEART___; DAB: NOW Bristol

Programming
- Format: Hot AC

History
- First air date: (as Radio West) 27 October 1981 (as GWR) 1 October 1985
- Last air date: 16 July 2010

Heart 96.3 (formerly GWR FM Bristol) was an Independent Local Radio station serving Bristol and surrounding areas and broadcasting on 96.3 MHz in Bristol and Weston-super-Mare. Launched in 1981 as Radio West, it was merged with neighbouring Wiltshire Radio and relaunched under the name GWR in 1985, retaining the name through several changes of ownership until rebranding in March 2009. Heart Bristol merged with sister stations in Somerset and Bath to form Heart West Country.

== History ==
=== Radio West ===
Radio West began broadcasting on Tuesday 27 October 1981, eleven years after the region's first local radio station BBC Radio Bristol launched. The station started a full service commercial radio station on 96.3 MHz FM and 1260 kHz AM (238 metres medium wave) – the culmination of a merger between two companies bidding for the Bristol and Bath radio licence (Radio Avonside and Bristol Channel) awarded by the then Independent Broadcasting Authority. The choice of on-air name proved to be simple when the BBC aired a series called Shoestring complete with the fictitious Radio West.

Headquartered in expensive studio premises in the Watershed complex on Bristol's Harbourside, by 1983 the station had suffered losses of £300,000. The original senior management team left the station, with John Bradford moving from Radio Tees to take over as managing director and news editor Mike Stewart appointed programme controller. This resulted in considerable changes to the programme output and presentation line-up, including Roger Day (ex Caroline, Piccadilly, and BRMB) being brought in to host the breakfast show. By October 1983, the station was closing each evening at 7:30pm, but as the station became more mainstream, it was able to broadcast throughout the evening and also late night by the end of the following year.

Although the station was broadcasting programmes of a high quality (including award-nominated computer show Datarama), listeners remained loyal to the BBC's Radio Bristol, already established as the radio station for the area.

Financially, commercial radio struggled to make any money as the 1980s economy in Britain was hampered by union strikes. Radio West had not made any profit since it started and looked set to close, when the neighbouring local station Wiltshire Radio, based in Swindon made an approach to merge the two stations, creating a station covering from Weston-super-Mare in the west to Swindon and Hungerford in the east, with opt out programming for the two areas. This merger was approved by the Independent Broadcasting Authority and was completed in September 1985.

The history of Radio West formed part of 'Eddie Shoestring's Bristol', a documentary presented by Xander Brett for Burst Radio in 2022, featuring contributions from former CEO of Radio West and Wiltshire Radio Ralph Bernard, and former Radio West presenter Johnnie Walker. In a 2016 programme transmitted by BBC Radio 2, Walker credited Dave Cash with his chance to join Radio West"BBC Radio 2 - Radio 2 Remembers Johnnie Walker, Johnnie Walker Meets... Peter Kay".

=== GWR launch ===
Radio West formally closed at just after midnight on Monday 9 September 1985 with a special final programme hosted by Trevor Fry and the final closedown announcement from Mark Seaman (the station's programme organiser). Test transmissions for GWR commenced the next day before it launched as a 24-hour full service station at 6 am on Monday 1 October 1985.

The new station aired separate output for Bristol and Wiltshire at breakfast and mid-morning. All other programmes came from the Wooton Bassett studios at the Lime Kiln. New disc jockeys were brought in, however the station still sounded like competitor Radio Bristol with its mix of music, news and talk (as was the trend in British commercial radio at the time due to needletime restrictions) and listening figures were not improving.

=== Split services ===
GWR Radio began splitting frequencies as required by the government – which declared its desire to end simulcasting on both FM and AM. GWR Radio launched Brunel Radio on 15 November 1988, a "golden oldies" station on 1260 kHz in Bristol, and 936/1161 kHz AM in Wiltshire. In the early 1990s Brunel started networking programming to 2CR Radio in Bournemouth and Radio 210 in Reading, Berkshire. Each station had Classic Gold appended to the end of their names (e.g. Brunel Classic Gold, 210 Classic Gold). Local news and shows were combined with networked programmes in each of its areas.

After the lifting on sanctions restricting the time spent playing music (so-called 'needle time') in 1988, GWR FM became more and more music-led, playing Top 40 chart music during the daytime, and specialist music (big band music, rock, rap etc.) was gradually phased out. The local element of the station, especially its news coverage, had progressively become briefer and reduced in length, then moved onto Brunel Classic Gold, before being dropped altogether. GWR FM at last become popular, with the rise in listening figures confirming this.

A Bath ILR licence was awarded by the IBA in 1986. GWR Radio Bath debuted on 22 May 1987, as a separate station, later known as Bath's GWR FM and Heart Bath. All programming being shared from GWR Bristol, local output was provided for a time at breakfast only. However, for official licensing purposes, GWR Bath and Bristol were listed as one station and audience figures from RAJAR were combined with GWR Swindon. All programming for GWR Bath were broadcast from Bristol, but there was a small 'GWR Bath' office in Avon Street at one time.

=== The Mix Network ===
In 1992, a re-launch of the station saw The New GWR-FM become the hub of what was The Mix Network, a network of radio stations owned by the GWR Group (latterly GCap Media) covering southern England and Wales. The radio station's (and the group's) long held philosophy of heavily researching the average person's listening habits and tastes led by group chairman Ralph Bernard created a tightly formatted sound where popular Top 40 chart hits and ex-Top 40 songs were blended in with older hits. This led to a Better Music Mix format which spread to other radio stations within the GWR Group, including Essex FM, Trent FM and Beacon Radio creating a mini national network.

The practice for the Mix Network stations was for each station to play a centrally produced playlist (from GWR FM itself). Songs were broadcast at the same time as neighbouring group stations and each station adopted the Better Music Mix tagline, to be said by local disc jockeys in between songs. Fans of the previous guises of some stations bought by the GWR Group, notably Essex FM and Beacon Radio were unhappy at the sudden re-branding of the stations, accusing the new management of reducing local output such as news bulletins and replacing local programming with networked shows such as Late Night Love and The Request Fest, which originated from the Bristol studios.

Despite protests from outside Bristol, GWR FM continued to be popular with RAJAR listening figures showing an average 14% listening share of all radio broadcast in the area.

=== Licence renewal ===
In 2002, the Radio Authority renewed GWR FM's licence. It was due to expire in October 2009, but was extended to expire on 28 October 2013, according to GWR FM licensees page. However it was automatically renewed because it provides a DAB simulcast signal. The same scenario applied to its sister stations GWR FM Bath and Classic Gold 1260.

=== Weston-super-Mare relay ===
In late 2007, GWR FM launched a relay of their Bristol service to the Weston-super-Mare area on 103.0 MHz FM, as for many years Weston had been officially covered by the station, but had suffered from a poor 96.3 MHz FM signal in many parts of the town. The programming on this relay was identical to the Bristol service, aside from jingles and sweepers that stated 'GWR Weston', and had separate advertisements for North Somerset listeners. This led to the somewhat confusing situation that although the station branding said 'GWR Weston', all DJ links reference 'GWR Bristol' and feature Bristol oriented news, event guides and competitions.

=== Ofcom yellow card ===
On 13 March 2009, Ofcom issued GWR Bristol with a "yellow card" after a content sampling report showed that only 47% of GWR Bristol's music was from the past 2 years, much lower than its minimum 75%.

=== Network restructuring ===
On 21 June 2010, Global Radio announced plans to merge Heart Bristol with Heart Somerset and Heart Bath as part of plans to reduce the Heart network of stations from 33 to 16. The new station, Heart West Country, began broadcasting from Bristol on 16 July 2010.

== GWR acronym ==
The initials GWR have an association with the Great Western Railway especially in the South West of England, and there is a popular misconception with listeners that the station stands for Great Western Radio. Indeed, neighbouring GWR Wiltshire was called Wiltshire Radio (WR) before its merger with Radio West. However, according to group management, the letters GWR did not stand for anything. In fact the station management at the time did try to secure the name Great Western Radio, however it was already the trading name of a Bristol electronics shop, who refused to relinquish the title.

It should also be noted that GWR's oldies service was originally called Brunel Classic Gold, after the Great Western Railway's founding father Isambard Kingdom Brunel.

== GWR Group ==
The company which formerly owned GWR, the GWR Group, expanded from the late 1980s / early 1990s onwards to purchase other stations throughout the country. It became the largest radio company in the UK, before merging with its competitor Capital Radio to become GCap Media on 9 May 2005.

== Premises ==
- 1982–2001: Watershed Centre, Canons Road, Bristol
- 2001–2021: Passage Street, Bristol
- 2021–present: Temple Quay, Bristol

== See also ==
- Heart Network
- Heart Bath
- Heart Gloucestershire
- Heart Wiltshire
