= Laser Broadcasting =

British radio operator

Laser Broadcasting was a commercial radio operator based in Darlington in County Durham, England, which was active between 2002 and 2008.

== History ==
The group was founded in 2002 by Nigel Reeve—one of the launch directors of Classic FM and one-time chief executive of London News Radio, owners of LBC—and Nick Jordan, a media sales executive who previously worked at Invicta Radio, KMFM and the Daily Express. Jordan left the company in August 2004.

Laser Broadcasting, via subsidiaries, held the licences for nine commercial local radio stations in the UK:

- Bath FM, in Bath, Somerset
- Brunel FM, in Swindon, Wiltshire
- Sunshine 855, in Ludlow, Shropshire
- Sunshine 1530, in Worcester
- Sunshine 106.2, in Hereford
- Quay West 107.4, in Bridgwater, Somerset
- Quay West 102.4/100.8 in Watchet, Somerset
- 3TR FM, in Warminster, Wiltshire
- Fresh Radio, in Skipton, North Yorkshire

After administration, Begbies Traynor sold five of Laser's stations to farmer and property developer John Roberts, who was also the owner of Exeter-based South West Radio Ltd. He bought Bath FM, Brunel FM, 3TR, and the two QuayWest stations.
