= Bath FM =

Coordinates: 51.3835°N 2.3864°W

107.9 Bath FM
- England
- Broadcast area: Bath
- Frequency: 107.9 MHz

Programming
- Format: Classic Hits

Ownership
- Owner: South West Radio Ltd

History
- First air date: 15 November 1999 – 24 March 2010

Bath FM was a local independent radio station based at the former Weston railway station in Bath, England. The station was launched in November 1999 and closed on 24 March 2010.

The launch event was held in the pub opposite the radio station and it went live at 7.30am on Monday 15 November 1999. Breakfast show presenter Simon Parkin was the first voice heard on air and the first show from the newly installed studios.

The station originally broadcast to an area with a population of 82,000.

== History ==
Bath FM, initially an independent station, was launched in November 1999 as an alternative to GWR FM Bath, which also served the city. The original ownership was mainly in the hands of local businessman Andrew Brownsword.

In February 2006, Bath FM was taken over by The Local Radio Company (TLRC). In June 2008, TLRC sold Bath FM, along with nearby stations Brunel FM and 3TR FM, to Laser Broadcasting. On 28 October 2008, Laser Broadcasting were placed into administration.

On 29 October 2008, it was announced that Bath FM had been sold to South West Radio Ltd. Bath FM was sold alongside Brunel FM, 3TR FM, and two Quaywest stations, following the collapse of previous owner Laser Broadcasting.

South West Radio LTD went into administration on 4 August 2009. The assets and contracts were acquired without liability by YMC ltd who ran the stations as a group.

On 24 March 2010, the five stations were closed by administrators after multiple refusals on the part of regulator OFCOM to transfer the licences, following a number of financial issues at the stations following TLRC's sale.

== Technical ==
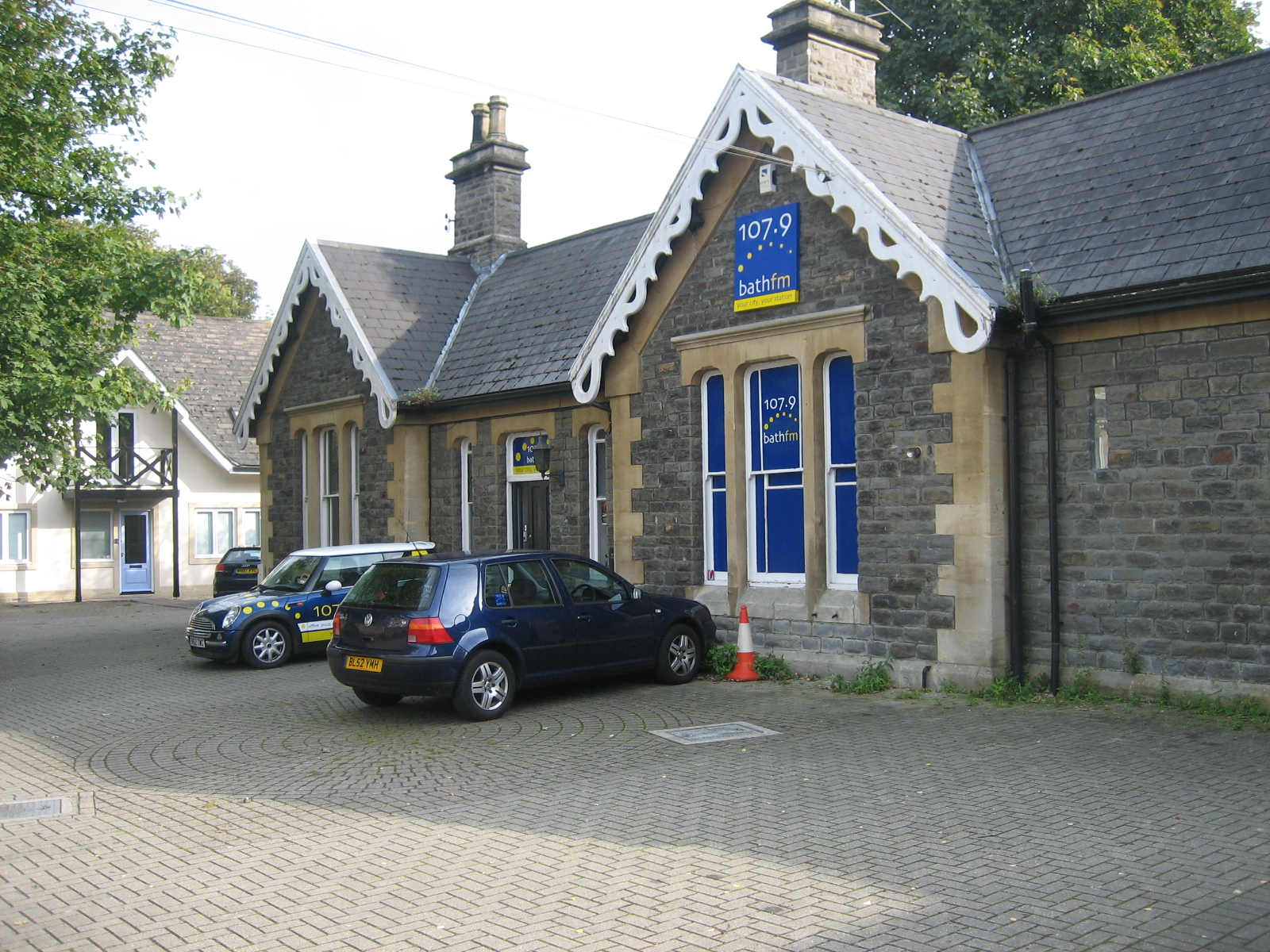
Bath FM offices

Bath FM's signal was broadcast from a transmitter based at Bathampton Down, next to the University of Bath.

In November 2007, Bath FM moved their studios to Swindon, 35 miles (56 km) away from their broadcast area, after Ofcom agreed to a request from The Local Radio Company to co-locate Bath FM with Brunel FM. On 9 September 2008, under Laser Broadcasting, Bath FM moved back into Station House and once again broadcast from the city until its closure. All broadcasting equipment and specialist wiring has now been removed from the premises, a former railway station.
