= 3TR FM =

England
- Broadcast area: Warminster, Westbury & Frome
- Frequency: 107.5 MHz

Programming
- Format: Contemporary

Ownership
- Owner: One Gold Radio Ltd

History
- First air date: 5 November 2001
- Last air date: 24 March 2010

3TR FM (Three Towns Radio) was an Independent Local Radio station based in the market town of Warminster, Wiltshire, United Kingdom. It broadcast on 107.5 FM to the West Wiltshire, East Somerset and surrounding area, and online via Internet streaming. It was formerly known as Pride FM until a name change took place shortly after the licence was awarded.

== History ==
On 5 November 2001, after a period of test transmissions, Jonathan Fido presented the first live programme, the breakfast show at 8:30am, accompanied by key local people from the area, staff from The Local Radio Company, and the station's crew at the time.

The last song to be played before officially going live was "Sweet Surrender" by Wet Wet Wet. A specially-produced introduction was then played featuring a montage of voice-overs, clips, and other segments officially launching the station. The first official song played was "Wake Up Boo!" by The Boo Radleys.

Shortly after the main on-air launch, James Moran and David Stratton (High Sheriff of Wiltshire) unveiled a gold plaque in the reception area of the station live on air, in front of many photographers and press reporters.

The station's studio in Wiltshire included two broadcast and production studios, several offices, a "glass room" (meeting space) (dismantled in latter years), a technical equipment hub, and a garden adjacent to the River Wylye.

On 30 June 2008, TLRC announced plans to sell six of its stations, including 3TR. It was purchased by Laser Broadcasting, who later went bust, and the group was bought by South West Radio, who also went into administration. On 24 March 2010, the five YMC Ltd stations, including 3TR, were closed by administrators after multiple refusals on the part of regulator Ofcom to transfer the licences to them from SWR.

Cheltenham-based TotalStar was 3TR FM's next owner, its fifth in less than two years. The company bought all of the stations previously owned by South West Radio Ltd. The firm already ran Star 107.5, which employed former BBC Radio 1 presenter Mike Read as its mid-morning presenter. The radio station was broadcast from Boreham Mill, in Warminster, but it was reported that it would now be aired from new offices, and would be sharing programmes with the five other stations.

The final schedule was as follows:

- Monday – Thursday:
- 07:00 – 11:00 Nick Burrett – Breakfast
- 11:00 – 14:00 Drew Haddon – The Soundtrack To Your Workday
- 14:00 – 19:00 Ray King – Afternoons/Hits 'n' Headlines Drivetime
- 19:00 – 07:00 Non-stop music and news on the hour
- Friday:
- 07:00 – 11:00 Nick Burrett – Breakfast
- 11:00 – 14:00 Drew Haddon – The Soundtrack To Your Workday
- 14:00 – 19:00 Ray King – Afternoons/Hits 'n' Headlines Drivetime
- 19:00 – 00:00 PartyZone
- Saturday:
- 08:00 – 12:00 Ray King – The Saturday Breakfast
- 12:00 – 14:00 Drew Haddon – The Saturday Pop Quiz
- 14:00 – 18:00 Tom Smith – Saturday Afternoons
- 18:00 – 20:00 Gary King – Totally Eighties
- 20:00 – 00:00 PartyZone
- Sunday:
- 08:00 – 12:00 Sunday Breakfast with Tom Smith
- 12:00 – 16:00 Sunday Life with Steve Collins
- 16:00 – 19:00 Rich and Kat Big Top 40
- 19:00 – 22-00 Vinyl Countdown with Dave Englefield
- 22:00 – 00:00 Non-stop music and news on the hour

As from March 2010, when the station went into administration and the studio was dismantled, the following list of songs were the only things that could be heard when tuning into the station (arranged alphabetically; tracks were not played in this order). This was due to the silence detector at the transmitter site receiving nothing from the studio and hence activating its MiniDisc backup loop. The MiniDisc was put on eBay and raised money for charity; it was bought by Johnathan Darwin.

- Alanis Morissette – "Ironic"
- Anastacia – "Left Outside Alone"
- Aretha Franklin & George Michael – "I Knew You Were Waiting (For Me)"
- Blondie – "The Tide is High"
- Electric Light Orchestra – "Livin' Thing"
- Everything but the Girl – "Missing"
- Howard Jones – "What Is Love"
- Huey Lewis and the News – "The Power of Love"
- Just Jack – "Starz in Their Eyes"
- Kaiser Chiefs – "Ruby"
- Lily Allen – "Smile"
- Nelly Furtado – "All Good Things (Come to an End)"
- Oasis – "Wonderwall"
- Simon Webbe – "My Soul Pleads for You"
- The Lighthouse Family – "Ocean Drive"
- Womack & Womack – "Teardrops"
- Yazoo – "Don't Go"
