= The Breeze (Cheltenham & North Gloucestershire) =

- England
- Broadcast area: Gloucestershire
- Frequency: 107.5FM (Cheltenham)

Programming
- Format: Easy listening
- Network: The Breeze

Ownership
- Owner: Bauer

History
- First air date: 7 September 1998
- Last air date: 31 August 2020
- Former names: CAT FM; Star 107.5; Total Star

Technical information
- Transmitter coordinates: 51.8941°N 2.0767°W

The Breeze (Cheltenham & North Gloucestershire) was an Independent Local Radio station serving Cheltenham, Gloucestershire.

The station was folded into Greatest Hits Radio South West, as part of a rebrand, on 1 September 2020.

== History ==
The station originally launched in 1993 as CD 603, broadcasting on the AM frequency left free by BBC Radio Gloucestershire. The station went through a number of name changes in that time including 603AM, BOSS 603 and Cheltenham Radio. After securing an FM licence Cheltenham Radio relaunched on 7 September 1998 as CAT FM.

In 2002, following a takeover by UKRD Group it was re launched as Star 107.5. UKRD themselves sold the station in 2008 to Storm Media Services who later changed the station name to Total Star. In March 2013, Storm Media Services sold the station again, this time to Celador Radio who confirmed it would relaunch as The Breeze.

It was based in Knightsbridge Business park in Cheltenham, Gloucestershire and played music from the 70's to today.

As Total Star, it held responsibility for networked programmes for the short lived Total Star network of radio stations in the South West of England.
