= Total Star =

Radio station in Gloucestershire, England

Total Star was the brand name of a radio station based in Cheltenham broadcasting in Gloucestershire owned by Celador. It was the licence holder for the Cheltenham and Tewkesbury licence issued by Ofcom.

Total Star's final day of broadcasting was Sunday 14 April 2013. Owners Celador launched the Cheltenham and North Gloucestershire version of "The Breeze" on Monday 15 April 2013.

Total Star has now since returned to Gloucestershire on 1 October 2017 broadcasting on DAB across Gloucestershire.

TotalStar Logo

== 2011 changes ==
The Total Star network reverted to operating as a single station in 2011 as a result of changes being made to the network and stations. When the Bath licence came up for re-advertisement Ofcom awarded it to Celador, operator of Bristol-based The Breeze 107.2, and the Bath service took the name The Breeze in 2011.

More Radio Ltd subsequently relaunched their three frequencies as More FM, and ceased sharing programming with the Cheltenham-based service, which continued to use the Total Star name under the ownership of Storm Radio. More Radio Ltd itself was sold to Celador who re-branded the stations to The Breeze and Jack FM.
