= Y Cymro =

Welsh-language newspaper

- Cover of Y Cymro in 2020
- Type: Monthly newspaper
- Format: Compact
- Owner: Cyfryngau Cymru Cyf.
- Editor: Barrie Jones
- Founded: 1932
- Language: Welsh
- Headquarters: Wrexham
- Circulation: 4,082 (as of 2003)
- Website: ycymro.cymru

Y Cymro (Welsh pronunciation: [ə ˈkəmrɔ], 'The Welshman') is a Welsh-language newspaper, which was first published in 1932. It was founded in Wrexham, and succeeded other newspapers of the same name that had existed during the 19th and early 20th centuries. It is Wales's only national newspaper in Welsh and was previously published weekly. In 2017, the owners and publishers, Tindle Newspapers Group, announced that they would stop publication and that they were looking for new owners to publish the paper. In March 2018, after negotiations between the two companies, its new owners Cyfryngau Cymru Cyf. started publishing Y Cymro as a monthly newspaper. The new company also set up a new Y Cymro website.

== Earlier newspaper of the same name ==
The first newspaper under the name Y Cymro was published in 1845; this was ecclesiastical in nature with a small quantity of English-language content. This newspaper was published in Bangor by the printer Edward Williams, but it closed two years later due to financial difficulties. It was based in London for a year, with John Ames (Ioan Meirion) as editor. It moved to Holywell between 1851 and 1860, where it was published by William Morris, then to Denbigh for six years. After a gap of four years, it was restarted by Isaac Clarke of Liverpool, formerly of "Granny's Shop", Ruthin, on 22 May 1890 under the editorship of Isaac Foulkes (Llyfrbryf, i.e. 'Bookworm'). During this period, Daniel Owen published chapters of his novel in the paper.

In 1907 the paper moved to Mold with the poet T. Gwynn Jones as editor, but it closed again between 1909 and 1914 before finding a home in Dolgellau. This was a religiously themed newspaper with Evan Williams Evans as editor; it closed in 1931. It was relaunched in Dolgellau in 1920 by William Evans.

== Modern history ==
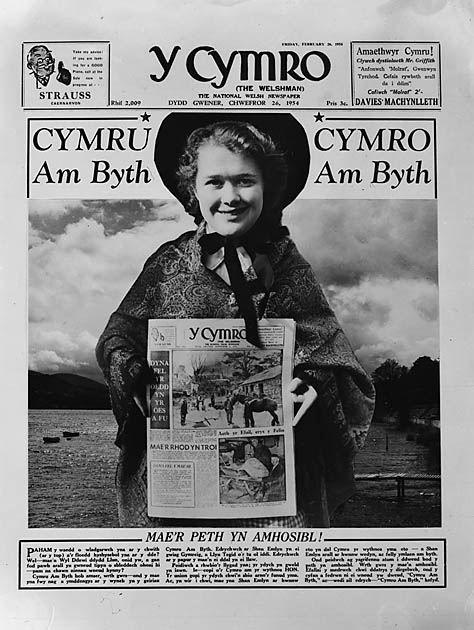
Y Cymro, 1954 St David's Day edition

Y Cymro was relaunched in Wrexham in 1932, when the title was purchased by Rowland Williams of Woodall, Minshall, Thomas & Co., Oswestry (the owners of Hughes & Son publishers of Wrexham).

Although he did not speak the language, Thomas's dream was to establish a new newspaper in Welsh. The first number was published on 4 December 1932, with John Eilian as editor. The paper was not entirely successful to begin with, but by 1939 there was some hope of making a profit. The office moved to Oswestry, where the paper went from strength to strength under the editorship of John Roberts Williams. The paper moved to Mold again when it became part of the company Papurau Newydd Gogledd Cymru ('North Wales Newspapers').

In 1945, John Roberts Williams became editor. Williams re-employed Geoff Charles as a photographer and built up an archive whilst working for the paper which is now in the National Library of Wales.

Williams's 17 years in the post saw the paper increase its circulation to a peak of 28,000 and introduced a new, more "professional" journalistic style. In 2004 it was sold by North Wales Newspapers to entrepreneur Sir Ray Tindle. Before that, the publication day of the paper was on Saturdays. As of 2003, circulation was about 4,100 printed copies.

In 2003 a digital version was published, which was available via the NewsStand company. Then, in 2004, the paper was purchased by the Cambrian News, part of the Tindle newspaper group, and the office moved to Porthmadog. The paper was relaunched in a new form in November 2004. A new website was launched in 2011, with a selection of stories from the paper and a full digital version available by subscription.

Cover of Y Cymro in 2007

In April 2010, the weekly editions of Y Cymro became available to view as an on-line digital newspaper.

In March 2017 Tindle Newspapers announced that the paper was for sale and would cease publication in June if no buyer was found. The publishers Y Lolfa stated that they were not in a position to buy the paper themselves By June, four groups had expressed interest in buying the paper, although negotiations continued between them, Tindle and the Welsh Books Council. Thus it was expected that the 30. June edition would be the last to be published for the time being.

In June 2017, the owners of Y Cymro could not find a buyer, and the paper closed down along with its website. In November 2017 it was announced that a campaign group had received funding from the Welsh Books Council to assist a relaunch of Y Cymro as a monthly newspaper, which was launched by Cyfryngau Cymru Cyf in March 2018.

== See also ==
- List of Welsh-language media
