= Tindle =

Media company in the British Isles

Tindle Group
- Type: Private
- Industry: Media
- Founded: 1950s
- Headquarters: Farnham, Surrey
- Area served: United Kingdom; Republic of Ireland; Channel Islands; Isle of Man
- Key people: Danny Cammiade (CEO); Owen Tindle (Chairman); Wendy Craig (Vice Chairman)
- Number of employees: 250
- Divisions: Tindle Newspapers; Tindle Radio
- Website: www.tindlenews.co.uk

The Tindle Group is a British private company operating radio stations and managing a property portfolio across the United Kingdom. It is owned by the Tindle family. The founder Sir Ray Tindle retired in 2017, dying in 2022, and was succeeded by his son, Owen Tindle. The company’s substantial holding of local newspapers was sold to a joint venture formed by Iliffe Media Group and the Fowler family in 2026.

== Newspapers ==
The Tindle newspaper empire started out in the 1950s, when Sir Ray Tindle acquired the Tooting & Balham Gazette with his £300 demob payment after his time serving during the Second World War.

At the company's peak, Tindle Newspapers owned and operated more than 220 local titles.

The following is a partial list of newspapers owned by the company:

- Abergavenny Chronicle
- Admart
- Alton Post Gazette
- Biggin Hill News
- Bordon Messenger
- Bordon Post
- Brecon & Radnor Express
- Cambrian News
- Chew Valley Gazette
- Cornish & Devon Post
- Cornish Times
- County Echo
- Crediton Courier
- Dawlish Gazette
- Edenbridge Chronicle
- Faringdon Newspapers
- Farnham Herald
- The Forester
- The Glamorgan Gem
- Godalming Messenger
- Haslemere Messenger
- Isle of Man Newspapers
- Leigh Times
- Life Magazines
- Meon Valley News
- Mid Devon Advertiser
- Monmouthshire Beacon
- North Cornwall Advertiser
- Petersfield Messenger
- The Ross Gazette
- South Hams Gazette
- Surrey & Hants News
- Tavistock Times
- Tenby Observer
- Wellington Weekly News
- West Somerset Free Press
- Woking News and Mail

In 2019, Tindle Newspaper Group closed four of their local newspapers.

== Radio stations ==
In the 1970s, Sir Ray Tindle was an early investor in Capital. In 1998, he sold back his shares in the company to buy Island FM in Guernsey, the first local station to form part of the Tindle group.

The company continued to grow and acquire a dozen stations in England and Wales. Tindle sold its UK radio assets to Anglian Radio in a management buyout in 2013. The stations were then sold on to Celador and later Bauer.

Tindle continues to own and operate Island FM, as well as Channel 103 in Jersey, Midlands 103 in Ireland, and Soleil Radio which broadcasts across the Channel Islands.

== Criticism ==
In 2003, as the Iraq War started, the owner of the Tindle Newspaper Group, Sir Ray Tindle, issued an order to his newspapers that they could no longer cover anti-war protests. This decision was controversial and was attacked as censorship by a number of commentators, including the National Union of Journalists General Secretary Jeremy Dear.
