= Isaac Clarke (publisher) =

Welsh 19th century newspaper proprietor, printer (1824 - 1875)

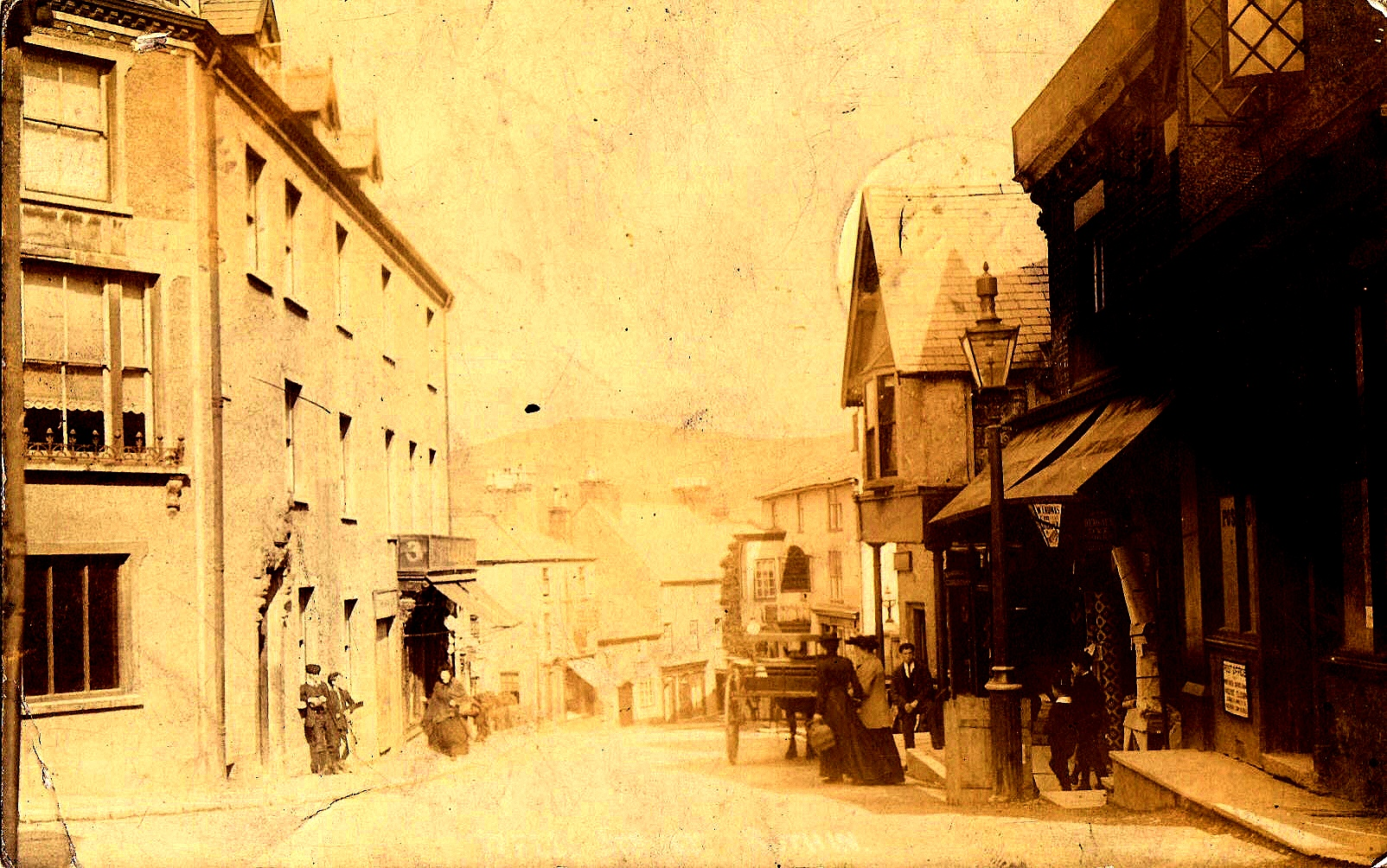
Siop Nain, located on the right by the lamp post

Isaac Clarke (1824 - 5 April 1875) was a Welsh 19th century newspaper proprietor, printer and publisher. He published the National Anthem of Wales: Hen Wlad Fy Nhadau ('Land of my Fathers').

According to his baptism records was baptised on 24 April 1824 in Mold Parish Church Clarke; his parents were Robert and Ruth Clarke who lived in the township of Leeswood (Coed-llai) which at that time was in the parish of Mold where his father was a farmer. Clarke did not follow in his fathers footsteps instead he learned his printing skills with Hugh Jones of Mold. In 1845 he left Jones to become an overseer at a small printing establishment in Ruthin owned by Nathan Maddocks and later his widow Mrs Jane Maddocks. Clarke lived and worked in Ruthin from 1845 until his death in 1875 where his printing shop overlooked the Wynnstay Arms Hotel. In about 1850 he set up his own business at 6 Well St, Ruthin, now run as 'Siop Nain'.

His memorial is at Collegiate and Parochial Church of St Peter, Ruthin which mentions that he died at the age of 51 on 5 April 1875.

== Hen Wlad fy Nhadau ==
The anthem was written by Evan James with the music by his son James James (1833-1902) and printed at 6 Well St now Siop Nain by Isaac Clarke in a book, "Gems of Welsh Melody", in 1860.

It was sung for the first time at Tabor chapel in Maesteg, South Wales in January 1856 by Elizabeth John. The tune was originally included in a collection by James James' called "Llyfr Tonau Iago ap Iago" which he had entered for a competition at the National Eisteddfod in Llangollen in 1858. The collection didn't win the competition, but was later included in an 1860 volume named "Gems of Welsh Melody" by Owain Alaw. Owain had been the adjudicator of the Llangollen Eisteddfod competition and gave it the title "Hen Wlad Fy Nhadau" (Land of my Fathers). The song, later became the first Welsh language song to be put on vinyl, sung by Madge Breese and recorded by the Gramophone Company on 11 March 1899.

In 1860 Isaac Clarke also published the first editions of "Oriau'r Hwyr"and "Oriau'r Boreu" by Mr J. Ceriog Hughes subsequently publishing further 5 editions of these books. Also that year 4 years after its composition Owain Alaw wrote to James James asking permission to publish the song in one of his forthcoming collection of "Gems Of Welsh Melody " of which Owain Alaw was to be the sole editor and arranger of music. Permission was granted but the result was disappointing to James James as Alaw slightly altered the original melody. This alteration no doubt, helped to gain its great popularity

== Works ==
In 1845 Clarke left Jones to become an overseer at a small printing establishment in Ruthin owned by Nathan Maddocks, then later his widow Jane Maddocks. Clarke lived and worked in Ruthin from 1845 until his death in 1875. In about 1850 he set up his own business at 6 Well Street, Ruthin (today's "Siop Nain").

It is also said that Clarke spotted the talents of the young poet John Ceiriog Hughes.

His first book was a volume of poetic works by John Blackwell (Alun) Ceinion Alun, which he published in 1851; in 1860 he published Ceiriog's first volume of poetry, Oriau'r Hwyr, of which nearly 30,000 copies were sold. The copyright of Ceinion Alun was bought by Blackwell's only sister Tabitha Kirkham of Llanrhydd Street, Ruthin who owned a small farmstead and sold milk in the town.

The Gems Of Welsh melody is the publication for which Isaac Clarke is mainly remembered. There were four volumes in the series, published in August 1860, 1861, 1862, and in 1864. Clarke purchased special "music types" and he was helped by the musician and printer Benjamin Morris Williams (1832–1903), from Bethesda, a choral conductor in Ruthin and Denbigh.

Clarke then moved to a new printing shop (probably the "Vale Insurance" premises) which overlooked the Wynnstay Arms Hotel. Two of his apprentices, both from Llanfwrog, were Lewis Jones (1835–1915), and Isaac Foulkes who went on to publish their own work. Foulkes founded, owned and edited Y Cymro which was first published on 22 May 1890 and remains in circulation.

He also published most of J. D. Jones's books on music, his songs, and his cantata "Llys Arthur" which was performed at the 1868 Ruthin National Eisteddfod. Clarke produced all the printing for the Eisteddfod.

== Death ==
Clarke died in 1875 and is buried in St Peter's Church Cemetery with his infant son, Arthur, who died ten years earlier. On the tombstone is recorded "In affectionate memory of Arthur, infant son of Isaac and Catherine Clarke, born May 1st, 1864, died March 8th 1865. Also the above mentioned Isaac Clarke, stationer, who died April 5th, 1875 aged 51. Also the above named Catherine Clarke, who died June 27th 1891, aged 66 years." She died in Aberystwyth.

== See also ==
- Isaac Foulkes, publisher of Y Cymro newspaper
