= Chelmsford Radio =

UK radio station

- England
- Frequencies: FM: 107.7 MHz; DAB: 12D (As Radio Essex); RDS: CHELMSFD

Programming
- Format: Contemporary

Ownership
- Owner: Adventure Radio

History
- First air date: 18 October 1998 as Chelmer FM; 14 February 2002 as Dream 107.7; 2 February 2009 as Chelmsford Radio
- Last air date: 23 March 2015

Technical information
- Transmitter coordinates: 51.7155°N 0.5743°E

Links
- Website: www.southendandchelmsfordradio.com

Chelmsford Radio 107.7 was an Independent Local Radio station for Chelmsford and mid Essex, broadcasting from studios in Southend, and owned by the Adventure Radio Group. It merged with Southend Radio in 2015 to create Radio Essex.

== History ==
Chelmsford Radio began broadcasting as Chelmer FM in 1998, under the ownership of Mid Essex Radio Ltd. In September 2001, the station was purchased by the Tindle Radio Group — owner of Dream 100 in Colchester — and rebranded as Dream 107.7 in mid-February 2002.

In September 2008, the station was sold by Tindle to Adventure Radio, the then owners of Mercury 96.6 and Southend Radio, with whom Ofcom approved a co-location arrangement for Dream to move its studios to the Southend complex. On 2 February 2009 the station re-launched as Chelmsford Radio. Chelmsford Radio shared its programming and resources with Southend Radio as well as Connect FM in Peterborough and Northamptonshire.

The 'Essex Action' feature was a community service designed to help local groups and charities with publicity and also with appeals for volunteers. The service was coordinated by the Southend Association of Volunteers (SAVS) with their counterparts across the county contributing items for broadcast.

On 6 June 2013, Chelmsford Radio and sister station Southend Radio launched on DAB under the singular service Radio Essex. The original DAB only Radio Essex was broadcast on the Essex DAB mux and could be heard in many places across the county where Chelmsford Radio couldn't, including Harlow, Colchester, and Sudbury (Suffolk).

In February 2015, it was announced that Chelmsford Radio, along with Southend Radio and Radio Essex, would be relaunched as one single station known as Radio Essex. The new station launched on 23 March 2015 on 105.1 FM, 107.7 FM, and on DAB.

In August 2025, it was announced that Radio Chelmsford, Radio Southend, and Radio Harlow would relaunch as Essex Breeze.

== Slogans ==
"Just Great Songs for Essex"

== Technical ==
Chelmsford Radio was broadcast on 107.7 MHz from a mobile phone mast at Church Green in the village Danbury. Before 2002, the station output was broadcast from a transmitter close to the A414 in Danbury.

The 107.7 signal could be received as far away as Basildon, Ongar, Braintree and Colchester.

== See also ==
- Radio Essex
- Connect Radio 106.8
- Connect Radio 97.2 & 107.4
- Mercury 96.6
- Southend Radio
