= Holidaymaker (magazine) =

Welsh magazine

- Type: Seasonal magazine
- Format: Tabloid
- Owner: Tindle Newspapers
- Editor: Beverly Thomas
- Language: Welsh and English
- Headquarters: Aberystwyth
- Website: Official Webpage

Holidaymaker is a seasonal publication produced by Cambrian News, for publicising tourism attractions and activities in parts of Wales.

== Overview ==
A full colour print, it lists attractions, activities and ideas of what to do and where to go.

Produced in three regional editions covering: Ceredigion & Mid-Wales; Gwynedd; and Pembrokeshire; it is printed in three editions in spring, Easter and summer.

Since 2009, Holidaymaker can be viewed for free as an online publication.

== See also ==
- Caribbean Beat
- Gourmet Traveller
- Scandinavian Traveler
