= Harborplace (disambiguation) =

Harborplace is a shopping/dining complex in Downtown Baltimore, Maryland, that is slated for redevelopment in 2027 to make way for a mixed-use development.

Harborplace or Harbour Place may also refer to:

- Harbour Place Shopping Centre, in Ireland
- Harbour Place, a housing estate in Hong Kong
- Harborplace Redevelopment, which will replace the pavilions

== See also ==
- Arbor Place in Douglasville, Georgia
- The Gallery at Harborplace, adjacent to the Harborplace pavilions
- Harbourside Shopping Centre in Sydney, Australia
- Harborplace Tower - a 28-story office building near the pavilions
- HarborPlace Tower - a residential tower in Long Beach, California
