= The Cardigan Bay Visitor =

English-language Welsh newspaper

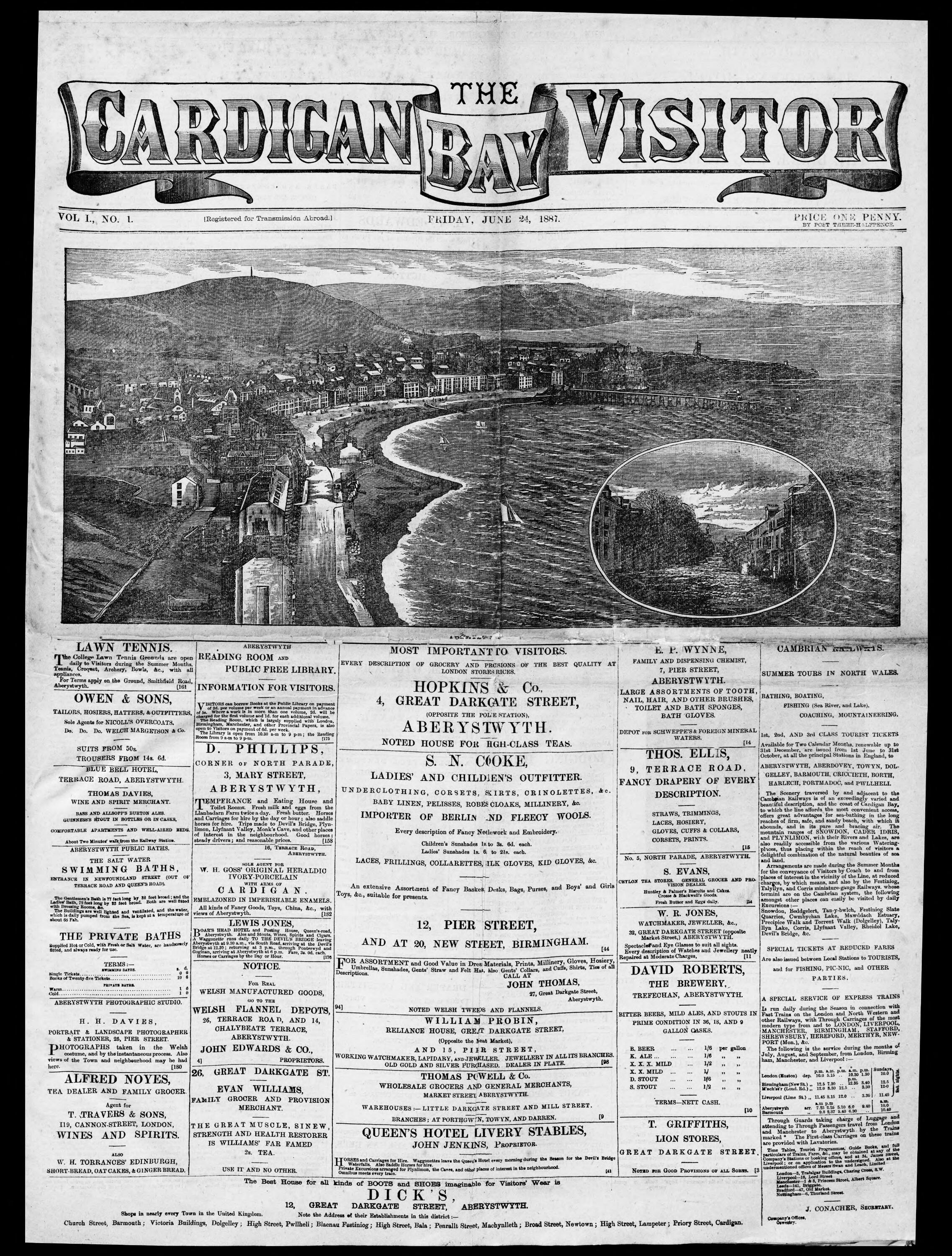
- Type: weekly newspaper
- Publisher: John Gibson
- City: Aberystwyth
- OCLC number: 556451162

The Cardigan Bay Visitor was a weekly English language newspaper distributed around Cardigan Bay, Towyn, Barmouth, and Dolgellau. It contained local news and information and a list of visitors. It was published by J. Gibson.

Welsh Newspapers Online has digitised 558 issues of the Cardigan Bay Visitor (1887–1905) from the newspaper holdings of the National Library of Wales.
