= Radio Essex (disambiguation) =

Radio Essex may refer to:

- BBC Essex, the BBC local radio station
- Radio Essex (pirate), the 1960s offshore pirate radio broadcaster owned by Roy Bates
- Radio Essex, a local radio station for Essex, England, via DAB, and Mid and South Essex via FM
- Heart Essex (Chelmsford & Southend), formerly Essex Radio
