= Wellington Weekly News =

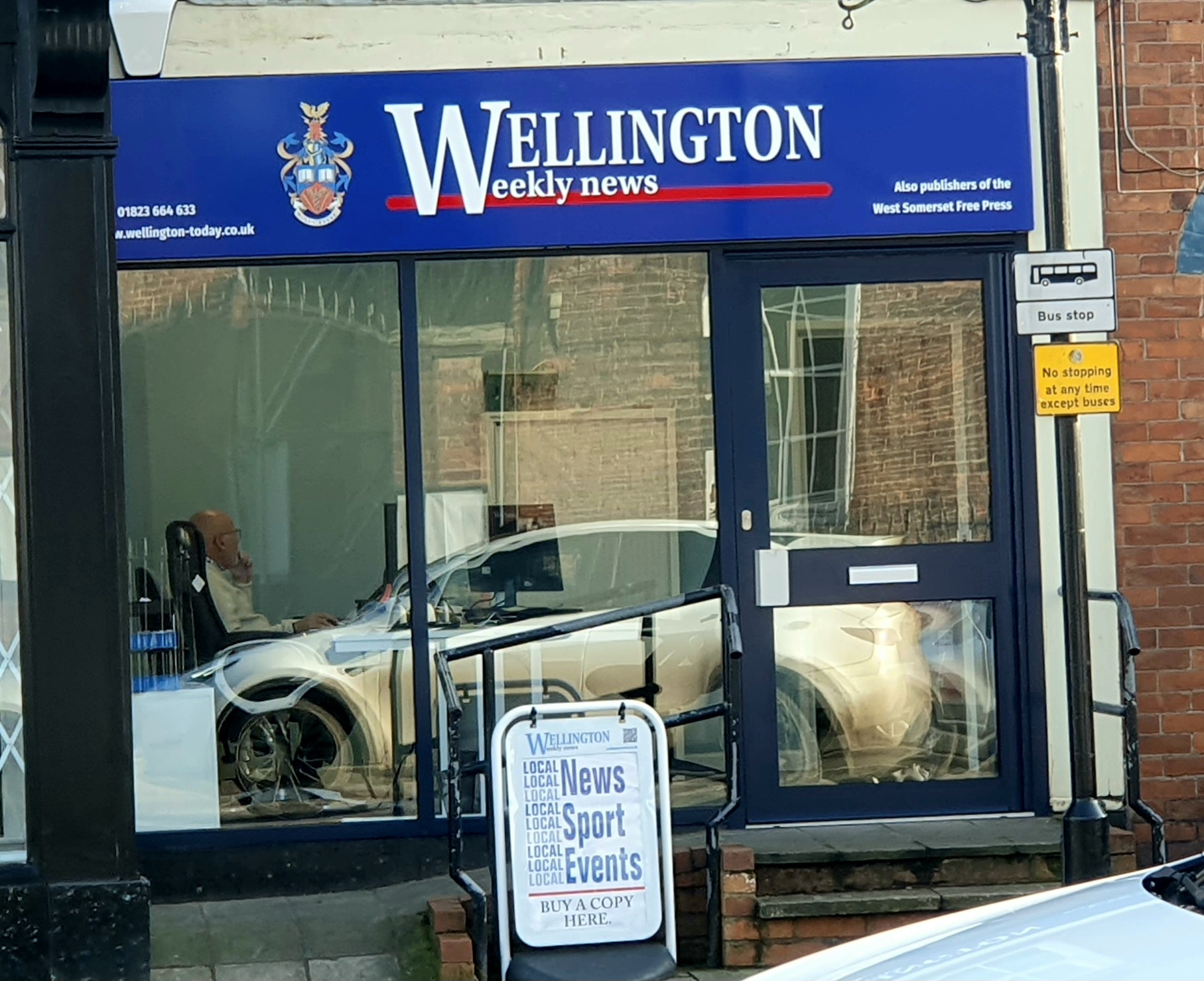
- Type: Weekly newspaper
- Format: Tabloid
- Owner(s): Tindle Newspapers
- Founded: 15 November 1860
- Language: English
- Circulation: 1,483 (as of 2023)
- Website: wellington-today.co.uk

The Wellington Weekly News is a weekly newspaper in Wellington, Somerset, England.

It was founded as Corner's Wellington Weekly News on 15 November 1860, the same day as the Wellington Times, two of 15 newspapers founded that year in Wellington. Founder Richard Corner owned a printing works on South Street. In 1872, the Weekly News absorbed the Times. Corner retired in 1876, when the paper was purchased by G. Bellamy and F. Whitty. In 1880, Corner's was dropped from the title.

It is owned by the Tindle Group, which bought it in 2006 from Northcliffe Newspapers.

== Former journalists ==
- Richard Cottrell, (1942-2024), who went on to become an MEP
