= Geoff Charles =

Welsh photojournalist

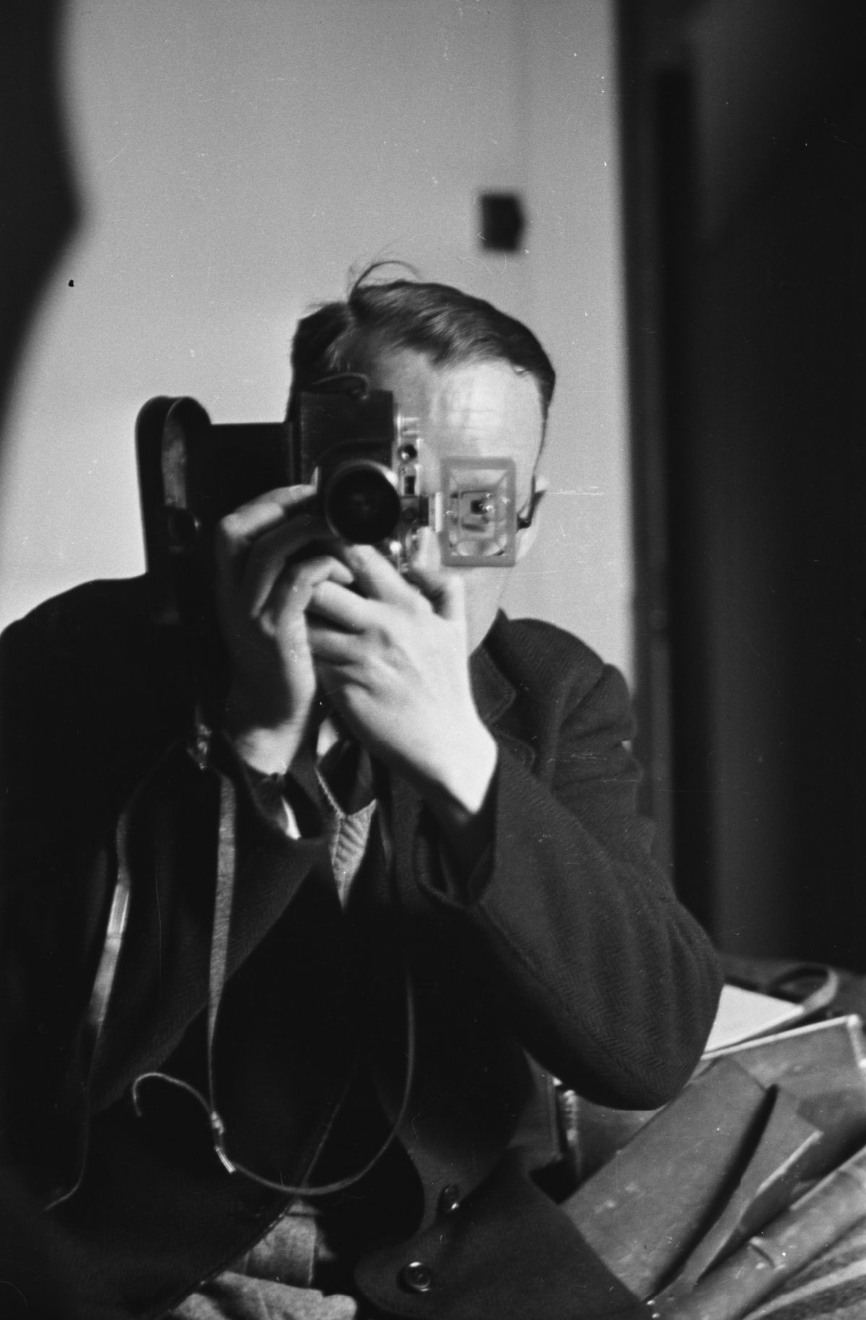
- Born: 28 January 1909; Brymbo near Wrexham, Wales
- Died: 7 March 2002 (aged 93)
- Education: University of London
- Occupation: Photojournalist

Geoff Charles (28 January 1909 – 7 March 2002) was a Welsh photojournalist. His collection of over 120,000 images is being conserved and digitised by the National Library of Wales. In 1985 he was inducted into the Gorsedd of the Bards at the National Eisteddfod in Lampeter taking the bardic name 'Sieffre o Brymbo'.

== Biography ==
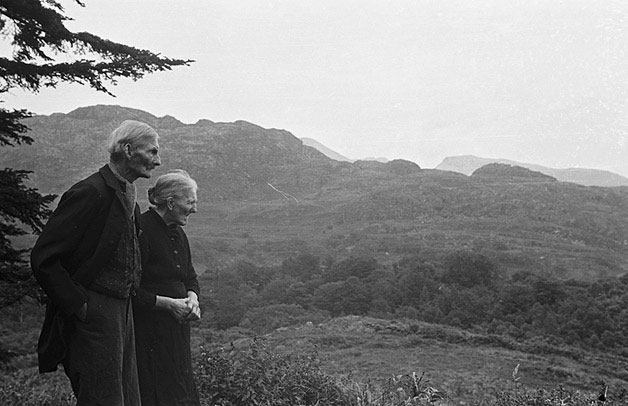
Carneddog and his wife, Catrin, before leaving their mountain farm in Snowdonia

Charles was born near Wrexham in the small community of Brymbo in 1909. He attended Grove Park School in Wrexham, where he was encouraged to study journalism by a teacher who observed that he had a talent for writing. He went on to study at the University of London, where he obtained a first-class diploma in journalism in 1928. He worked during the 1930s when the Depression meant that many found it difficult to get work. He worked on the Wrexham Star which was sold by unemployed people for a penny a copy. With his earnings he was able to buy his first Thornton-Pickard camera which used 3.5 x 2.5 inch glass plates.

Charles was involved in one of the Wrexham Star's scoops when he was able to smuggle himself into the lamp room of Gresford Colliery following the disaster there in 1934. By counting the number of missing lamps and miners’ helmets, he realised that the then public figure of 100 miners lost was a significant underestimate, and organised a special issue of the paper with this information. The final loss of life was 266.

In March 1936, the Wrexham Star was taken over by the Wrexham Advertiser which worked out well for Charles. He was offered the position of leading the photography department of Woodalls Newspapers. He then left to manage the Montgomeryshire Express where he met a reporter called John Roberts Williams. The two of them later worked together on the Welsh language newspaper Y Cymro., and together filmed, produced and directed one of the first movies shot in Welsh (Yr Etifeddiaeth, “The Heritage”).

Charles spent the war years working to improve farming practices by improved information. After the war he again went to work for Y Cymro where John Roberts Williams was now editor. Charles continued to document life through photography and one of his best-known images is used as the cover for Ioan Roberts's book about Charles —that of the poet and farmer Carneddog who had to move from his mountain farm near Beddgelert to live with his son in Hinckley. This image was published in Y Cymro in 1945. Charles took many photographs of Welsh life including the many eisteddfodau (cultural festivals). He also documented the loss of the Capel Celyn community under the river Tryweryn which was lost when it was flooded to create the Llyn Celyn reservoir for Liverpool. He covered the protest in 1956 when demonstrators who supported the threatened community travelled to Liverpool to hear the president of Plaid Cymru address the council.

== Preservation of images ==
Charles's collection of 120,000 negatives was donated to the National Library of Wales where they remained safely until the 1990s when it was discovered that the photographic negatives on triacetate film were destroying themselves due to a chemical reaction. The cellulose was decaying and creating acetic acid (vinegar syndrome) which would in time destroy the image. A technique has been developed that allows the image to be separated from the gelatin and cellulose and these are then replaced with a new polyester surface. Images have been scanned at 1200 dpi for display on the library's website at 75 dpi, "[suiting] the resolution of computer monitors; it also prevents illegal copying". Images are proposed for listing in the Europeana database as available under licence from the National Library of Wales

In August 2011, an exhibition of Geoff Charles's photographs was shown in Y Lle Celf (arts and crafts pavilion) at the Welsh National Eisteddfod in Wrexham.
