= Abergavenny Chronicle =

British local newspaper

- Type: Weekly newspaper
- Owner: Tindle Newspapers Ltd.
- Founder: Edwin Morgan
- Publisher: Abergavenny Chronicle Ltd. (1983–2023)
- Editor: W. M. J. Scanlon \& George Harris (first)
- Founded: 1871
- Language: English
- Headquarters: Tindle House, 13 Nevill Street, Abergavenny NP7 5AA
- City: Abergavenny, Monmouthshire
- Country: Wales, United Kingdom
- Circulation: 1,558 (as of 2024)
- Sister newspapers: Abergavenny Chronicle and Gazette
- ISSN: 2044-8406
- Website: abergavennychronicle.com

The Abergavenny Chronicle is a weekly local newspaper based in Abergavenny, Wales, United Kingdom. The paper is published weekly and its circulation covers the Abergavenny and the surrounding area, Crickhowell, Llantilio Pertholey, and Usk.

== History ==
The newspaper was founded in 1871, with the main content being local news. The paper's founder was Edwin Morgan. The proprietors have been:

- c.1906–1965: M. Morgan and Company
- 1965–1983: Berrows Newspapers Ltd
- 1983–2026: Tindle Newspapers
- 2026 - Iliffe Media

The newspaper's first two editors were W. M. J. Scanlon and George Harris.

The current editor is Liz Davies

Associated with the newspaper is the Abergavenny Chronicle and Gazette. The paper appears every Wednesday.
