= Channel 103 =

Independent Local Radio station for Jersey

- St Helier; Jersey
- Frequencies: FM: 103.7 MHz (Jersey); DAB: 12A (Channel Islands)
- RDS: Chnl 103

Programming
- Format: Contemporary hit radio
- Network: Hits Radio Network (for sales purposes)

Ownership
- Owner: Tindle Radio
- Sister stations: Island FM; Soleil Radio; Midlands 103; South East Radio

History
- First air date: 25 October 1992
- Former frequencies: 107.7 FM

Technical information
- Licensing authority: Ofcom
- Power: 6 kW
- Transmitter coordinates: 49°15′5.33″N 2°7′52.20″W

Links
- Webcast: Radioplayer
- Website: Channel 103

Channel 103 is an Independent Local Radio station broadcasting to the island of Jersey on 103.7 FM and DAB+ digital radio.

The station launched on 25 October 1992. Channel 103 is part of Tindle Radio, which also owns Island FM in Guernsey and Midlands 103 in Ireland.

According to RAJAR, the station has a weekly audience of 41,000 and a 20.0% market share as of September 2026 – the highest percentage reach of any radio station in the British Isles.

In late 2020, Channel 103 became a part of Bauer's Hits Radio Network for commercial sales. It remains owned by Tindle, with no shared programming.

== Programming ==
Channel 103's core audience is the 25-44 age group, playing contemporary hits –– predominantly from the early 1990s to the present day.

News bulletins are presented locally from 6:30am until 6pm, Monday to Friday.

The station's weekend news service broadcasts local content, presented either from Jersey or Guernsey from 8am until noon. Sky News provides the service outside these times.

== Transmission ==
From its launch in 1992 until 16 March 2021, Channel 103 broadcast from studios on Tunnell Street in St Helier.

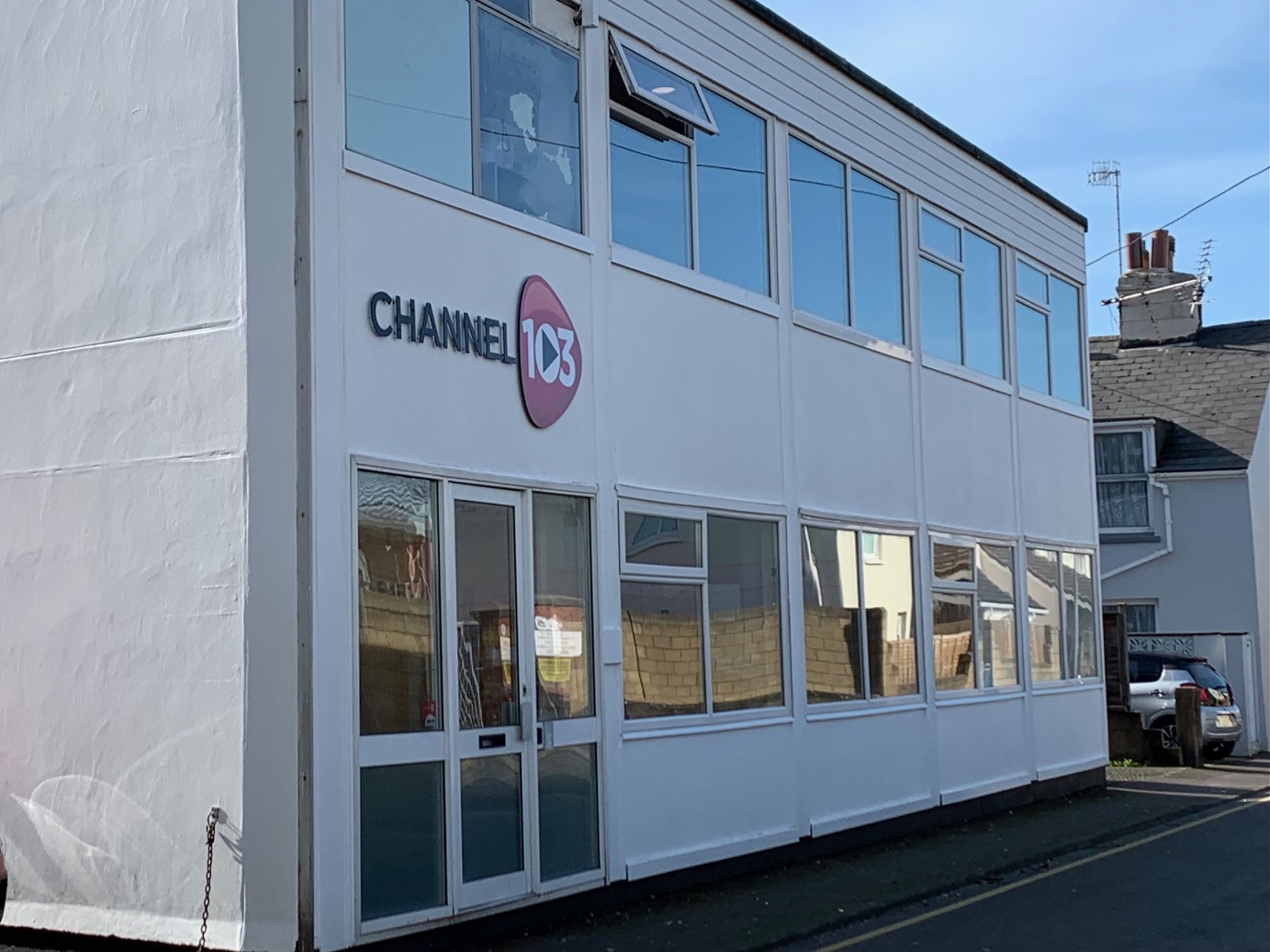
Channel 103's former Tunnell Street studios

In 2021, the station vacated its original building and moved to a new studio complex in Britannia Place, St Helier. It continues to transmit on FM from the Arqiva mast at Frémont Point, on the north coast of the island. In September 2024 the 103.7FM signal was increased to 6kW ERP, improving reception in St Helier as well as the east coast of Jersey.

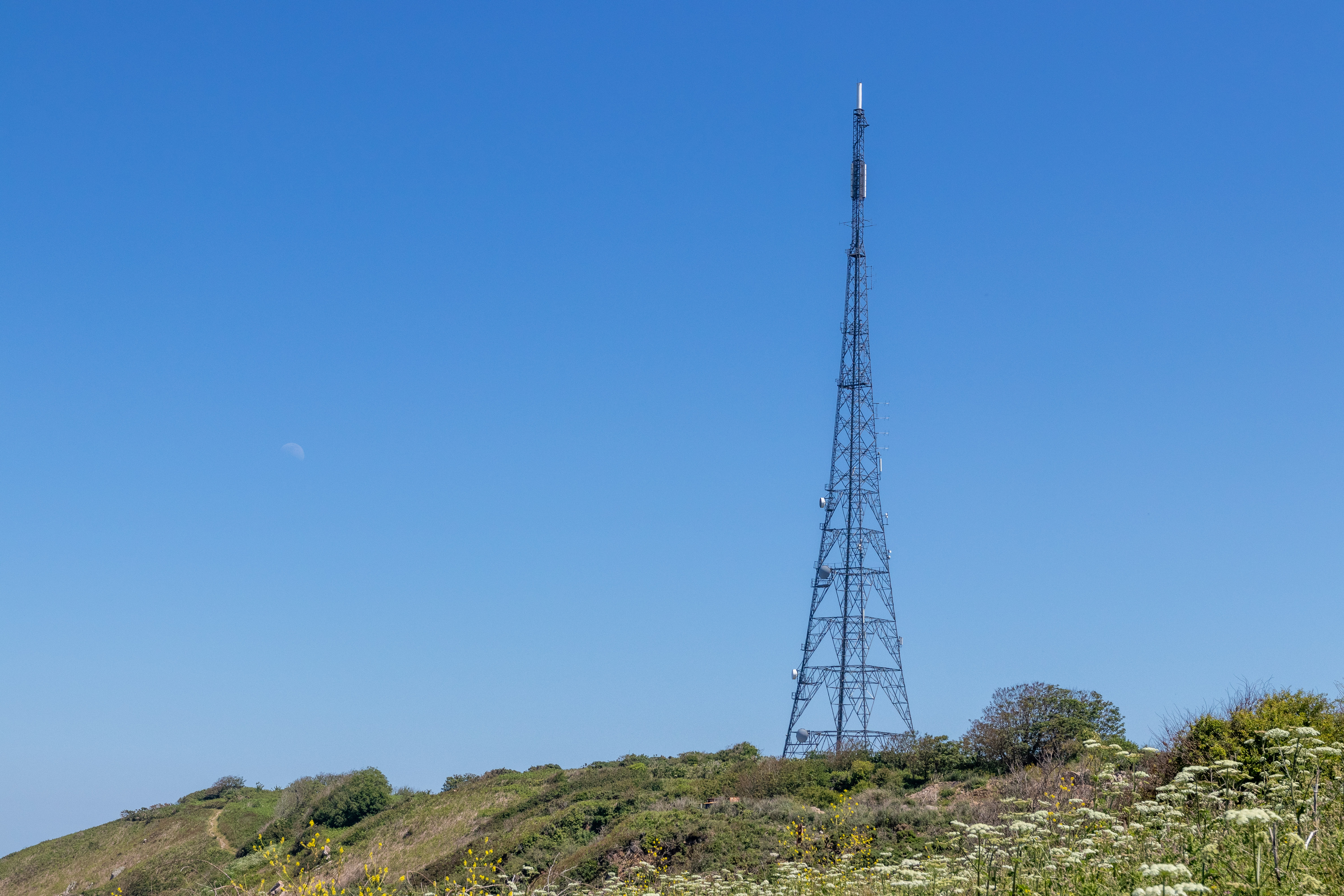
Channel 103's Frémont Point FM transmitter

Channel 103 began digital radio transmissions, alongside those of Island FM, on 1 August 2021 with the launch of the local Ofcom-licensed DAB multiplex for the Channel Islands. This service is radiated from transmitters at Les Platons (Jersey) and Les Touillets (Guernsey) and Fort Albert in Alderney.

== See also ==
- BBC Radio Jersey
- Contact 94
