= Chew Valley Gazette =

Newspaper in Somerset, England

- Type: Monthly newspaper
- Editor: Rowland Janes
- Founded: 1984
- Language: English
- Headquarters: Chew Magna
- Circulation: 13,500
- Website: chewvalleygazette.co.uk

The Chew Valley and Wrington Vale Gazette is a monthly local newspaper for the Chew Valley and surrounding areas of north Somerset, England.

It was previously published as the Chew Valley Digest. The first issue of the Digest was published in April 1984 and the last issue was printed in January 1989, to be replaced by the Gazette, which published its first issue in February 1989.

The paper's offices are in Chew Magna. It is distributed free to local residents and available on subscription to others. It also publishes the annual Chew Valley Green Pages.

In December 2011 the title was sold by Northcliffe Media, the owners of the Bristol Evening Post to the Tindle Newspaper Group.
