= Siop Nain =

Building in Denbighshire, Wales

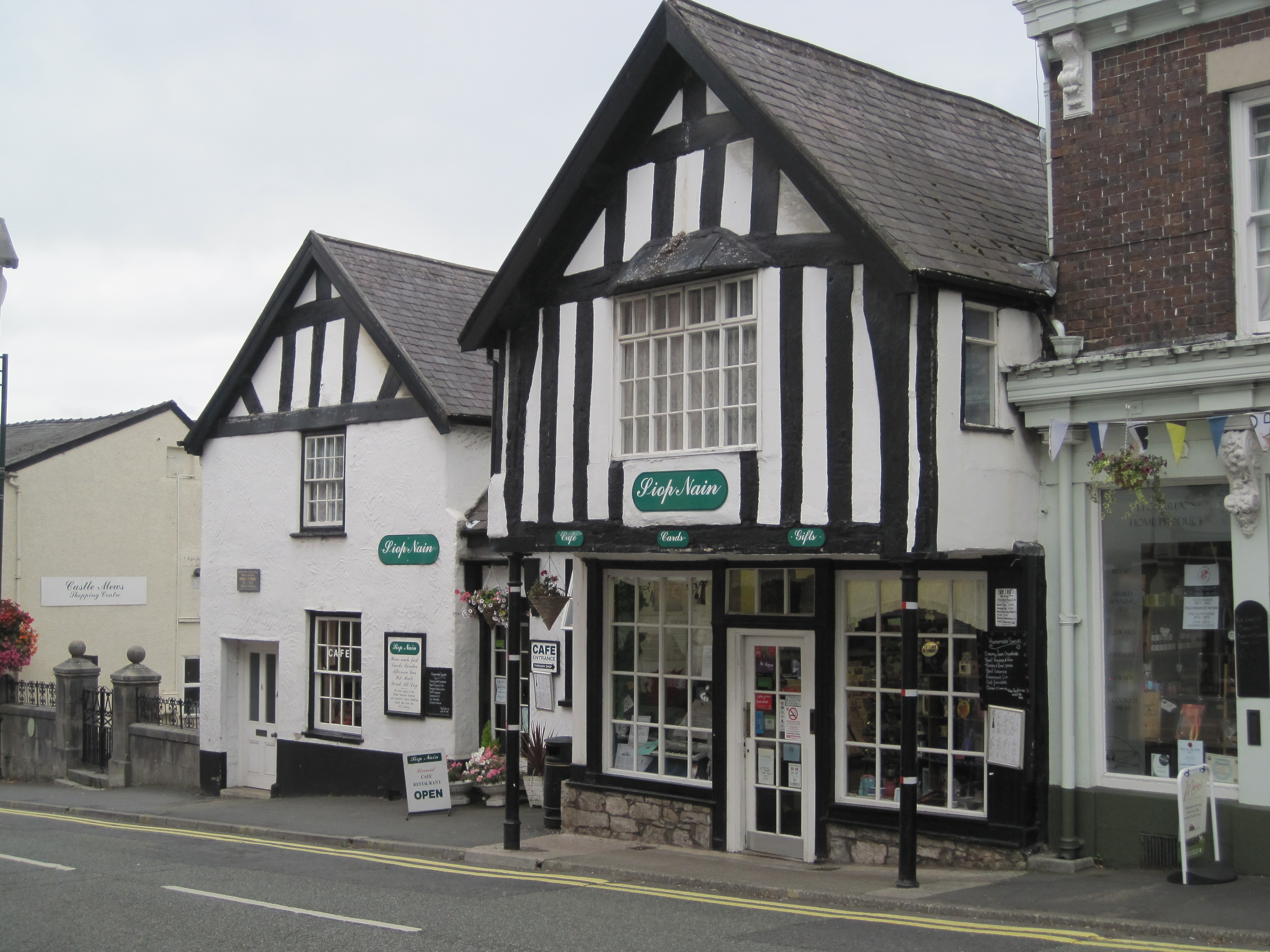
- Siop Nain in 2013
- Interactive map of the Siop Nain area

General information
- Location: Ruthin, Denbighshire, Wales
- Coordinates: 53.114015°N 3.310060°W
- Completed: 1490

Technical details
- Structural system: Timber framed

Listed Building – Grade II
- Official name: 6 Well Street including former workshop to rear
- Designated: 4 July 1966
- Reference no.: 938

Siop Nain is a Grade II listed building near the centre of Ruthin, Denbighshire, Wales, and dates back to 1490. From 1850 Isaac Clarke used a building at the back as a print shop, which is most notable for the first printing of the National Anthem of Wales: Hen Wlad Fy Nhadau. Around 1850 he set up his own business at 6 Well Street, Ruthin. "Siop Nain" is also known as 6 Well Street.

It has been listed "for its special architectural interest as a sub-medieval timber-framed building retaining early character and detail, with some good C17 and C19 detail. The printing of the Welsh National Anthem here is of additional historic interest. Group value with surrounding listed buildings in Well Street."

It is now a licensed restaurant and a card and gift shop selling English- and Welsh-language gifts and cards.

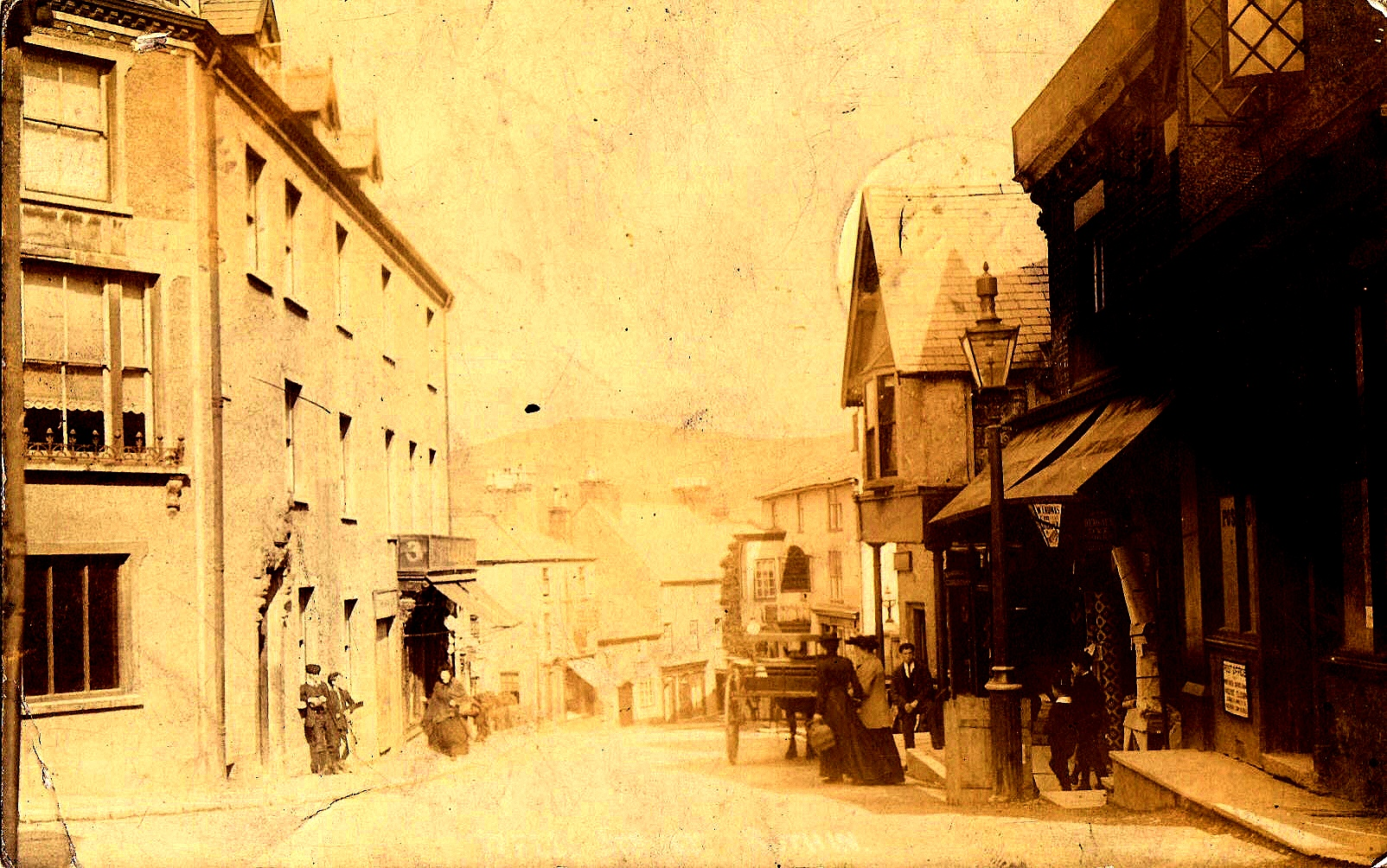
Well Street, Ruthin, with Siop Nain on the right
