= Harbour Place Shopping Centre =

Small shopping centre in Mullingar, Ireland

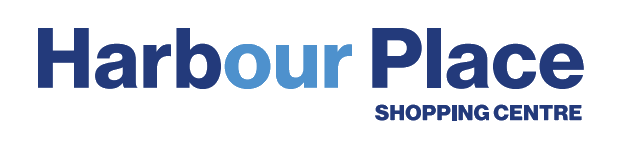

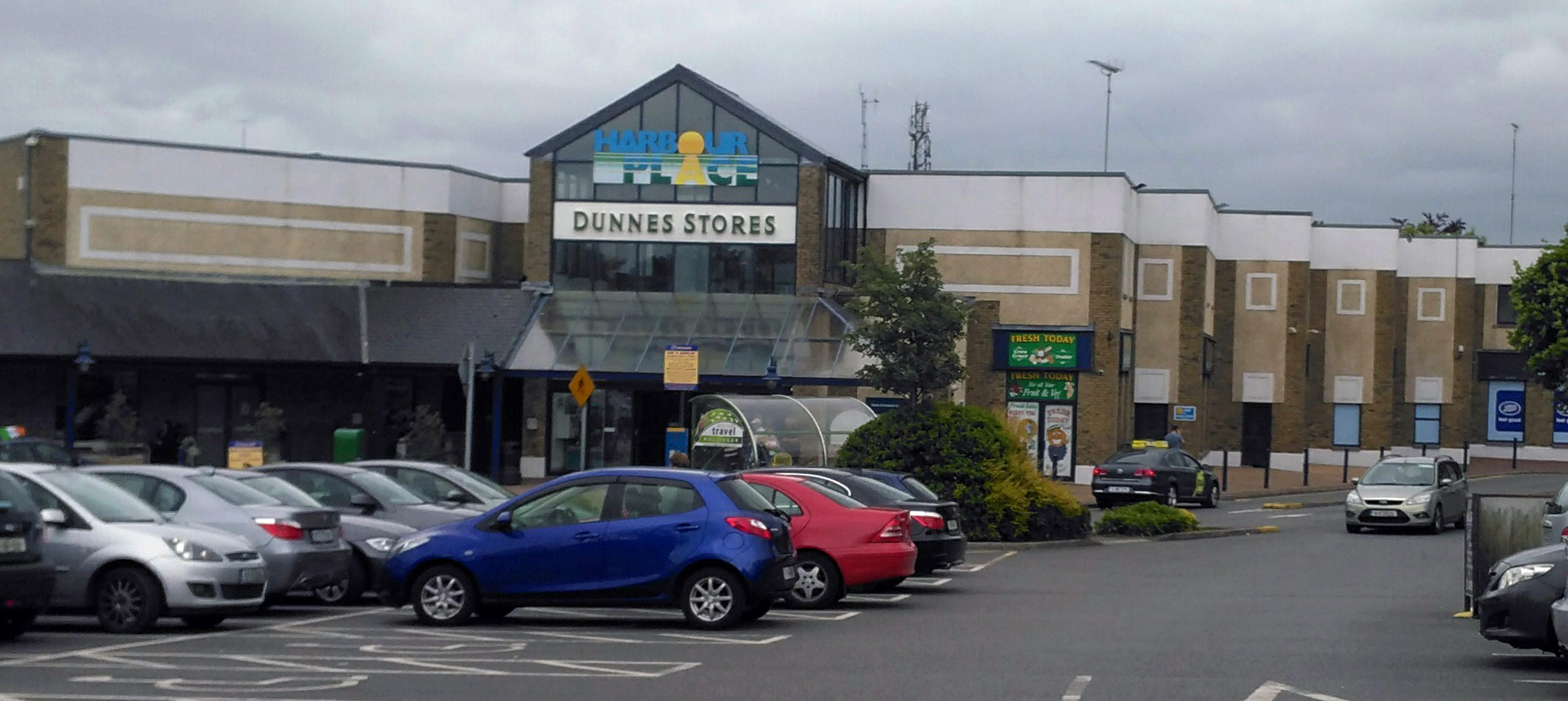
- The rear façade of the shopping centre, 2016
- Location: Mullingar, County Westmeath, Ireland
- Coordinates: 53°31′40″N 7°20′23″W
- Address: 15 Harbour Street; Mullingar; Westmeath
- Opened: 17 June 1997; 29 years ago
- Developer: Deerland Construction Limited
- Manager: Bannon
- Owner: Lanthorn
- Num. of anchor tenants: 1; Dunnes Stores
- Floor area: 98,000 square feet (9,100 m^{2})
- Floors: 2
- Parking: 520 spaces
- Website: harbourplace.ie

Harbour Place Shopping Centre is a shopping centre located in Mullingar, County Westmeath, Ireland. Opened in 1997, the centre is anchored by one of the largest Dunnes Stores branches operating across Ireland.

== History ==
=== Development and issues ===
In early 1986, Deerland Construction Limited, a construction company based in Kilkenny, announced plans to construct a 107,000 square feet (9,900 m^{2}) 40 unit shopping complex with over 500 parking spaces in the former Flanagan's Sawmills site at the junction of Friars Mill Road and Harbour Street, including a 41,000 square feet (3,800 m^{2}) Dunnes Stores outlet at a total cost of £5 million.

On 29 August 1987, it was announced that the plans had been rejected by An Bord Pleanála due to an appeal made by RGDATA (a national organisation representing traders) acting on behalf of the Harbour Street Residents Association and two private individuals, Doreen Deering and Dr. William Waldron. It was stated that the rejection was due to the planned centre's excessive size which may have a detrimental effect on existing retail outlets in the town, potentially creating a rise in traffic generation, that the nearby Harbour Street would be affected by the demolition and would also cause access issues.

In October 1989, it was speculated that a scaled down version of the initial plan may be the way forward and would get planning permission from Westmeath County Council. The initial plan had been put into "cold storage" by An Bord Pleanála following the appeal made two years earlier in 1987.

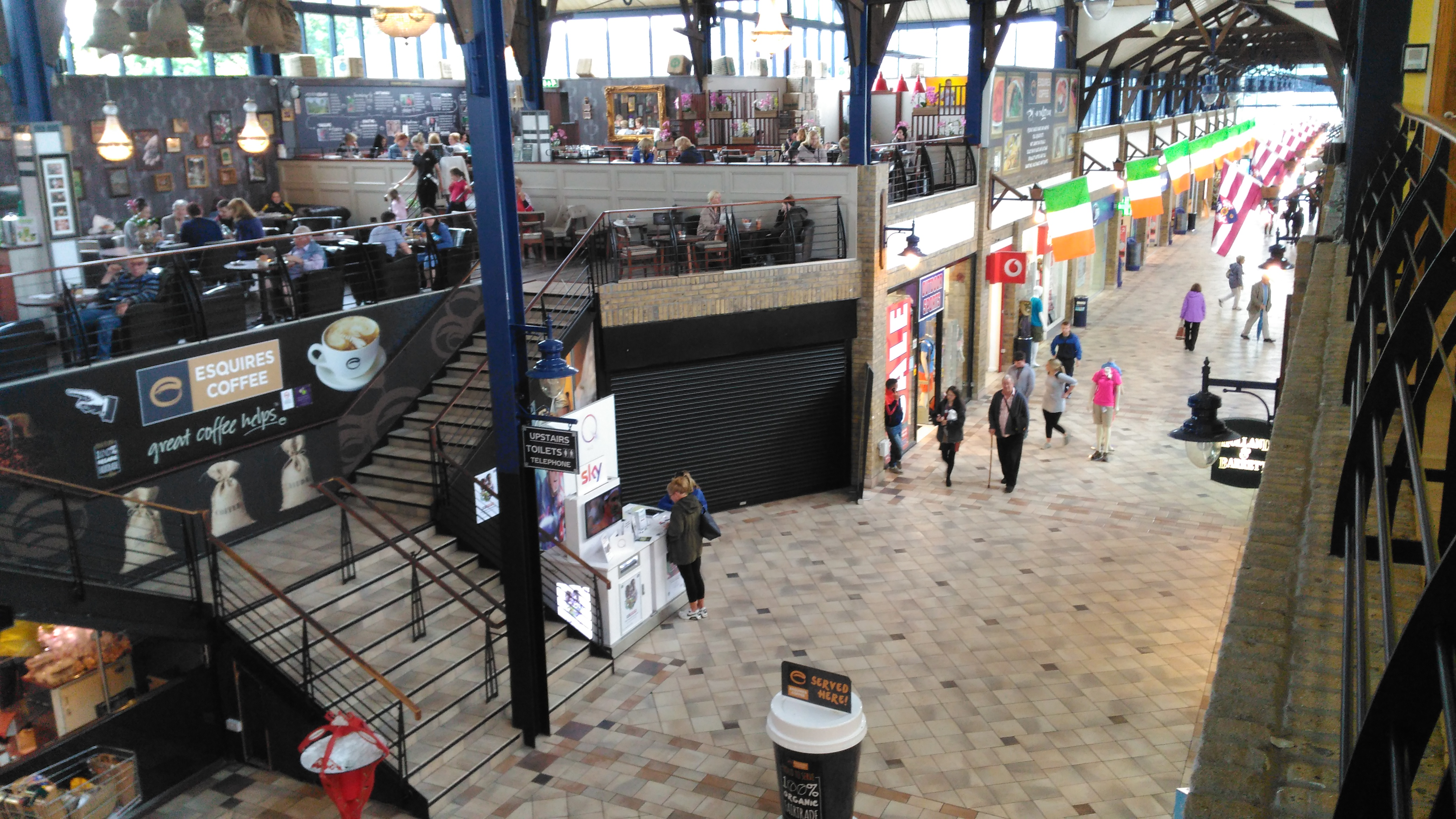
Interior viewed from the first floor

On 16 April 1991, a meeting was held between Deerland Construction Ltd and the Mullingar Business Association regarding the prospect of the shopping complex going ahead with a revised six acre plan alongside a vote taking place with the vote resulting in 64 in favour, 34 against. The developers stated that 300 jobs would be provided at the complex, 100 during its construction and that the value would be £12 million. After the majority vote winning, planning permission was then approved by Westmeath County Council. The following week it was mentioned that Deerland was going to make, in total, a contribution of £79,450 to the county council which included £15,000 towards the cost of road traffic management, £20,000 towards the cost of road carriageway improvements on Friars Mill Road and £36,000 for the cost incurred in providing public car park accommodation serving the site and nearby.

In December 1991, planning permission was granted by An Bord Pleanála. This news was generally accepted well by locals due to the fact that the meetings were being held and Derry McPhillips (of Deerland) was altering plans to create a smaller plan.

The Mullingar Chamber of Commerce stated that it did not want the new shopping complex to be part of the urban renewal plan planned for the McCurtain Street, Austin Friars Street and Friars Mill Road areas of town in February 1994. By the end of November 1994, construction was stated to be planned to begin in the early months of 1995, with sixteen tenants having already booked units in the centre with proposed rents to be in the range of £18 to £24 per square foot.

=== Official opening ===
The shopping centre officially opened on 17 June 1997 by D. J. Carey at a total cost of £12 million. The Dunnes Stores was officially opened by the then CEO of the company, Margaret Heffernan on the same day.

On 28 June 1997, Mullingar Community Radio, part of Midland Radio 3 (both later rebranded as Midlands 103), was officially opened by the then Minister for Public Enterprise, Mary O'Rourke. The station's broadcasting studio is located on the first floor of the complex.

=== Auction and sale ===
In November 2014, the shopping centre was auctioned for €50 million on behalf of the National Asset Management Agency, along with the rest of The Harvest Portfolio which included the Johnstown Shopping Centre in Navan, Cashel Town Shopping Centre, Thurles Shopping Centre and Dungarvan Shopping Centre. The centre was later acquired by Sigma Retail Partners in July 2015.

== Operation and tenants ==
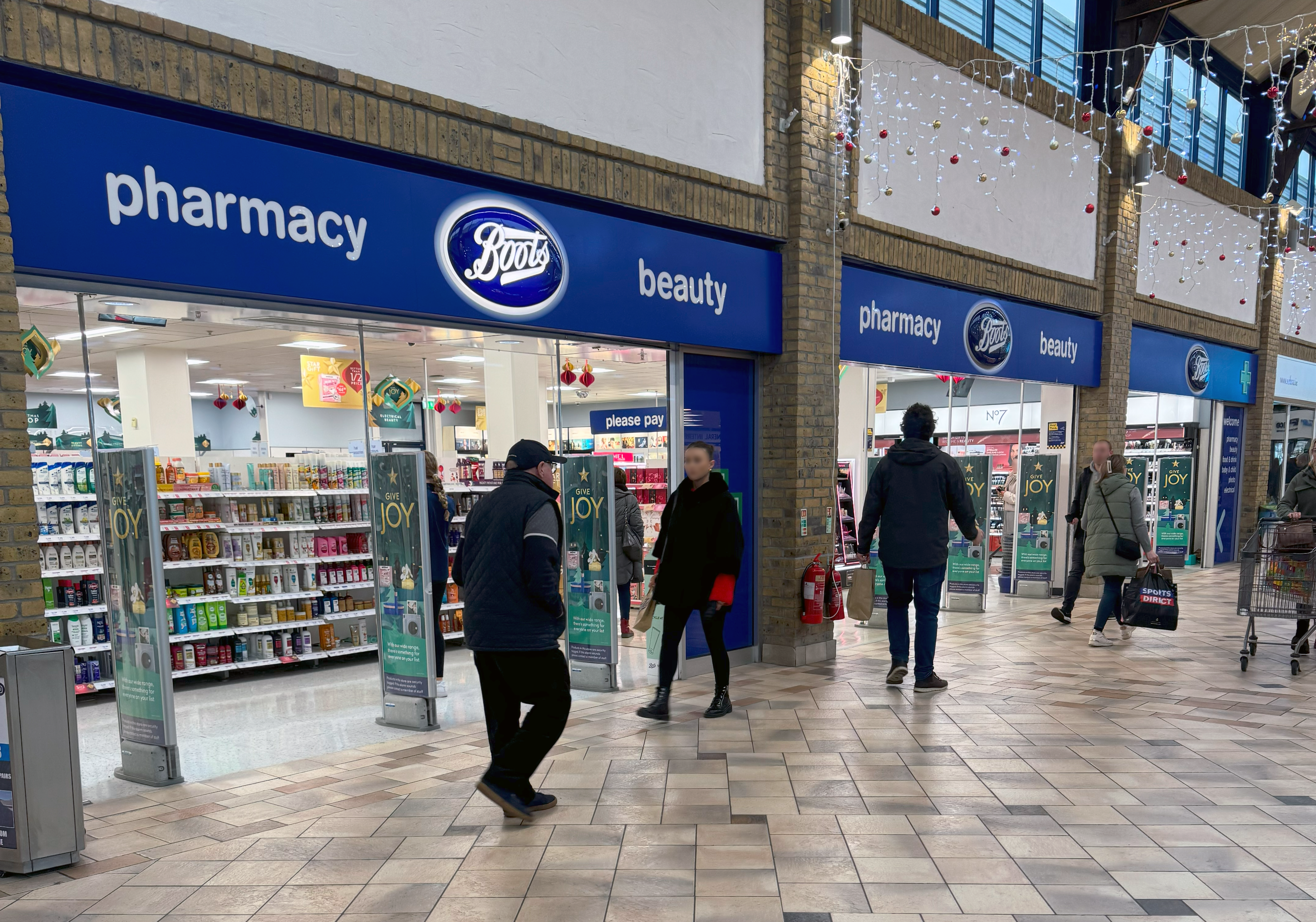
Boots is located on the ground floor

The shopping centre is anchored by Dunnes Stores which is also one of the largest in Ireland, consisting of both grocery and clothing departments. In late January 2015, Golden Discs (a former tenant where Carraig Donn is now located) closed down unexpectedly with the loss of 4 jobs; the owners deemed the shopping centre location "no longer commercially viable".

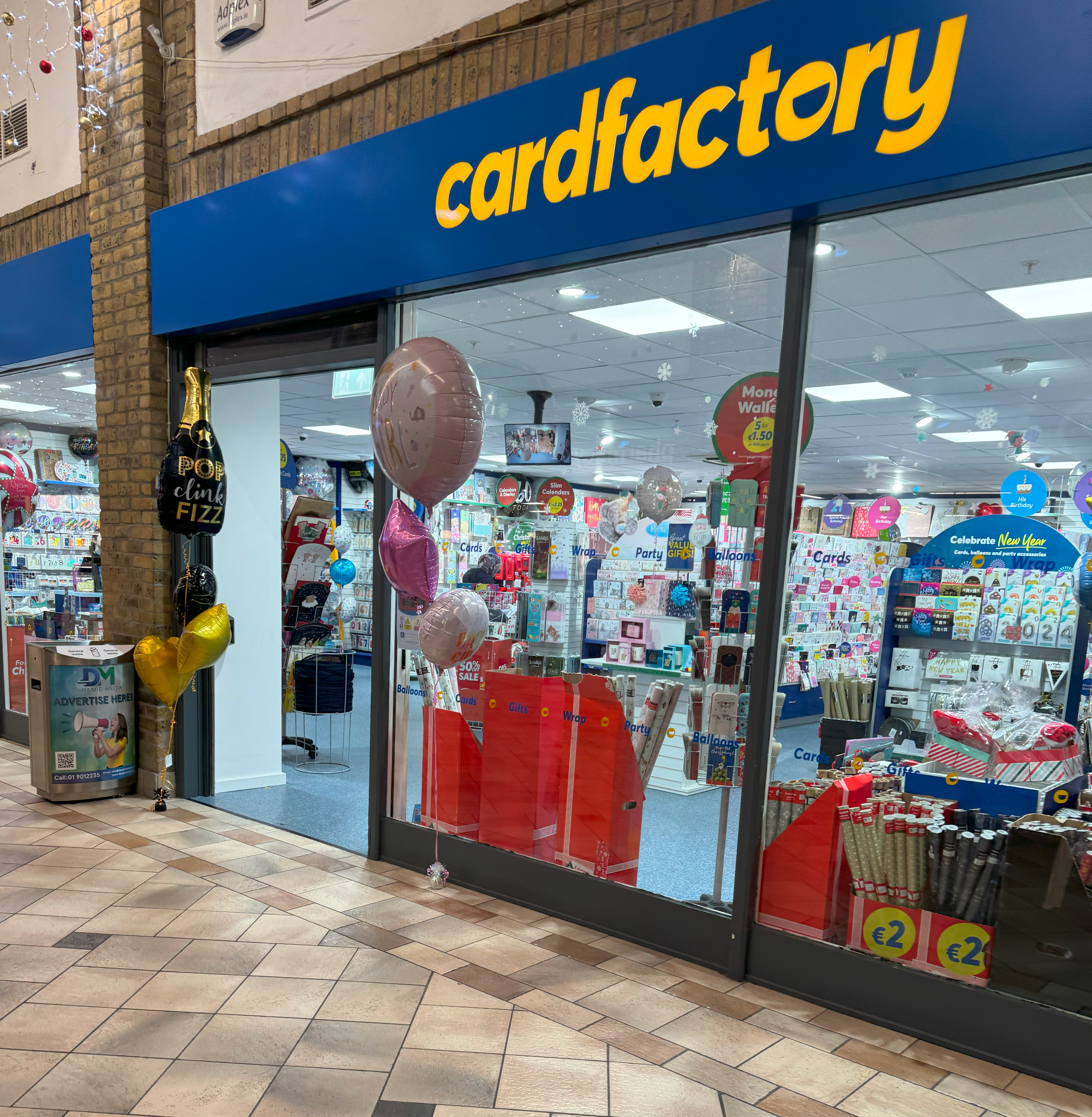
Card Factory is adjacent to Dunnes

As of 2025, in addition to Dunnes Stores, the tenants are Peter Mark, Holland & Barrett, Paul Byron Shoes, Esquires, Card Factory, Boots, Carraig Donn, Sweet Pea, Fit Culture Clothing, The Brow Bar Lounge, Boston Barber Bars, Peatai&Co, C.R. Tormey butchers, Claire's, Samie Ladies, Hale vape shop, Bookstation, O'Hehir's pâtisserie, Midlands 103, Waterlily Florist, Mobile King and IDFL (i Digital Fun); bringing the total number of tenants to 22.

In September 2023, the owners appointed the property management company Bannon to be the managers of the site as well as being the leasing agents.

=== Omniplex Mullingar ===
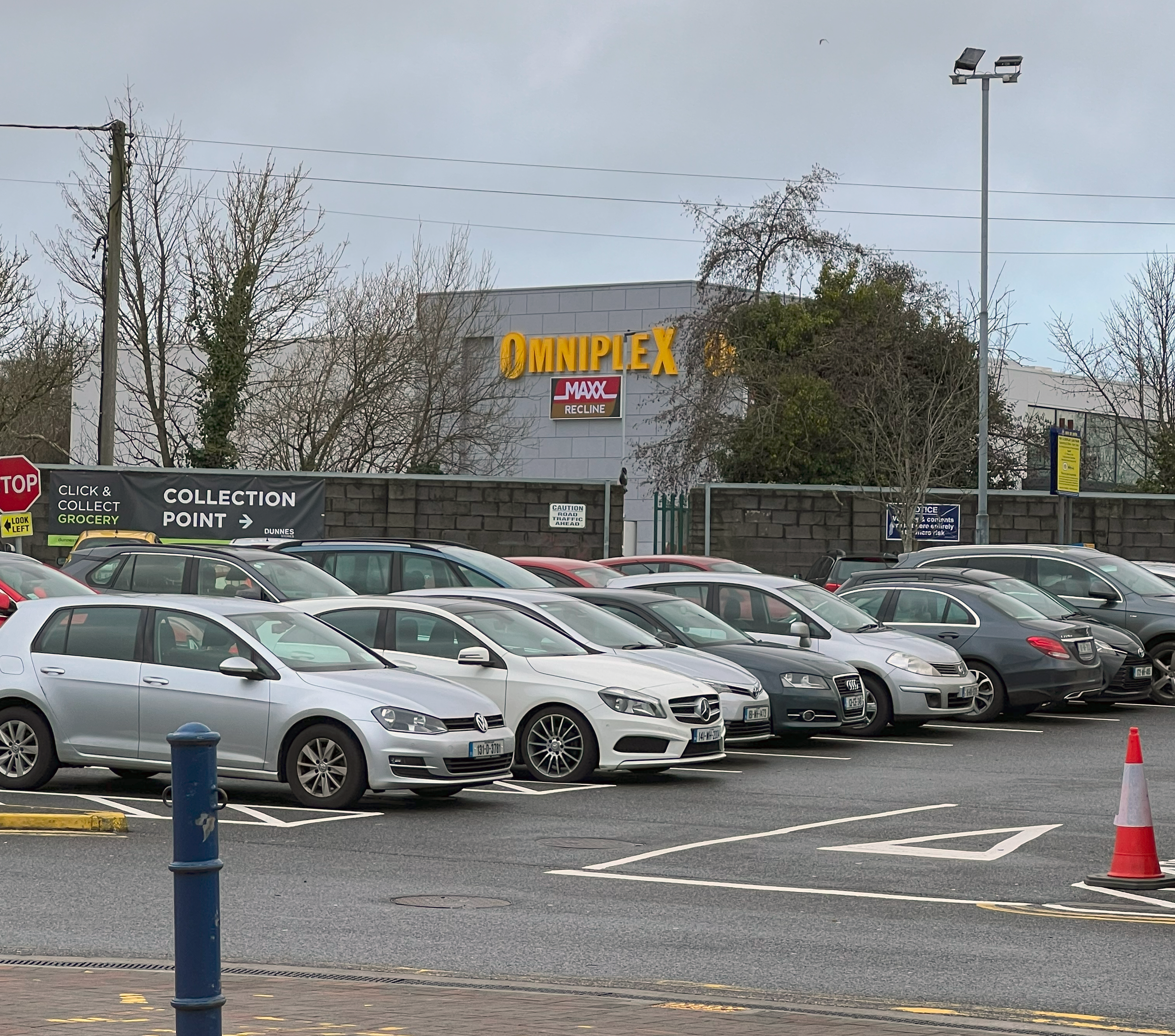
Omniplex cinema viewed from the shopping centre car park

In 2019, Omniplex were interested in establishing a cinema in Mullingar and had applied for planning permission to erect a five screen cinema in the disused overflow carpark at the rear of the shopping centre. In April 2020, planning permission was granted by Westmeath County Council. Due to the COVID-19 pandemic, construction was delayed but preliminary work on the site began in April 2022. Omniplex Mullingar was officially opened on 16 December 2022 at a total cost of €5 million.
