= Midlands 103 =

Irish local radio station based in Tullamore

Tullamore; Ireland
- Broadcast area: Counties Laois, Offaly and Westmeath
- Frequencies: 95.7FM (Tullamore); 95.4FM (Athlone); 96.5FM (Mullingar); 96.1FM (Castlepollard); 102.6FM (Stradbally & Borris-in-Ossory); 96.2FM (Portlaoise); 102.4FM (South Laois); 103.5FM (everywhere)

Programming
- Languages: English, Irish
- Format: Adult contemporary, talk

Ownership
- Owner: Tindle Radio Group
- Sister stations: Channel 103; Island FM; Soleil Radio; South East Radio

History
- First air date: 1990; 36 years ago
- Former names: Midlands Radio 3

Links
- Webcast: Listen Live
- Website: midlands103.com

Midlands 103 (previously known as Midlands Radio 3) is an Irish local independent radio station broadcasting to counties Laois, Offaly, and Westmeath.

The station's offices and main broadcast studios are in Tullamore, County Offaly. It also has studios in Athlone Towncentre Shopping Centre, Athlone and the Bridge Shopping Centre, Tullamore, and a studio and office in Harbour Place Shopping Centre, Mullingar, with programmes being broadcast regularly from all of these. Midlands 103 also has two outside broadcast units.

As of the end of 2021, Midlands 103 had a weekly reach of 122,000 listeners with 73,000 tuning in daily, according to Joint National Listenership Research survey figures.

== History ==
The station was established as "Radio 3" in 1990 having operated as an unlicenced broadcaster "Radio West" between 1982 and 1988.

In March 2025, Midlands 103 acquired the Wexford-based station South East Radio.

== Station output ==
The prime-time weekday schedule includes breakfast programming, a daily current affairs magazine show, music-driven programmes in the afternoon and "drive time" programming until 7pm.

The weekend schedule is a mixture of music programmes and sports coverage, which sometimes includes full commentary of local and inter-county Gaelic games. Ireland's longest running love songs show, "Twilight Time", is broadcast on Sunday nights.

== News ==
The newsroom is staffed by two full-time newsreaders and a sports correspondent. Midlands 103 also uses its own reporters and freelancers to cover events across the broadcast area. A sports reporter and commentators provide sports updates. The station produces its own local news bulletins for the region during peak times, with evening and weekend network bulletins produced by Bauer Media Audio Ireland.

== Sales and promotion ==
Midlands 103 is part of the group of independent stations affiliated with the IRS+ national media sales and marketing bureau, which provides national and international branded advertising. The station runs two annual awards ceremonies: the "Hospitality Awards" (which gives awards to pubs/bars, hotels, restaurants and the tourism sector), and the "Customer Service Awards" (which focus on customer service in retail and other business in the area).
