= Isaac Foulkes =

Welsh author and publisher (1836–1904)

Isaac Foulkes (Llyfrbryf; 1836–1904) was a Welsh author and editor.

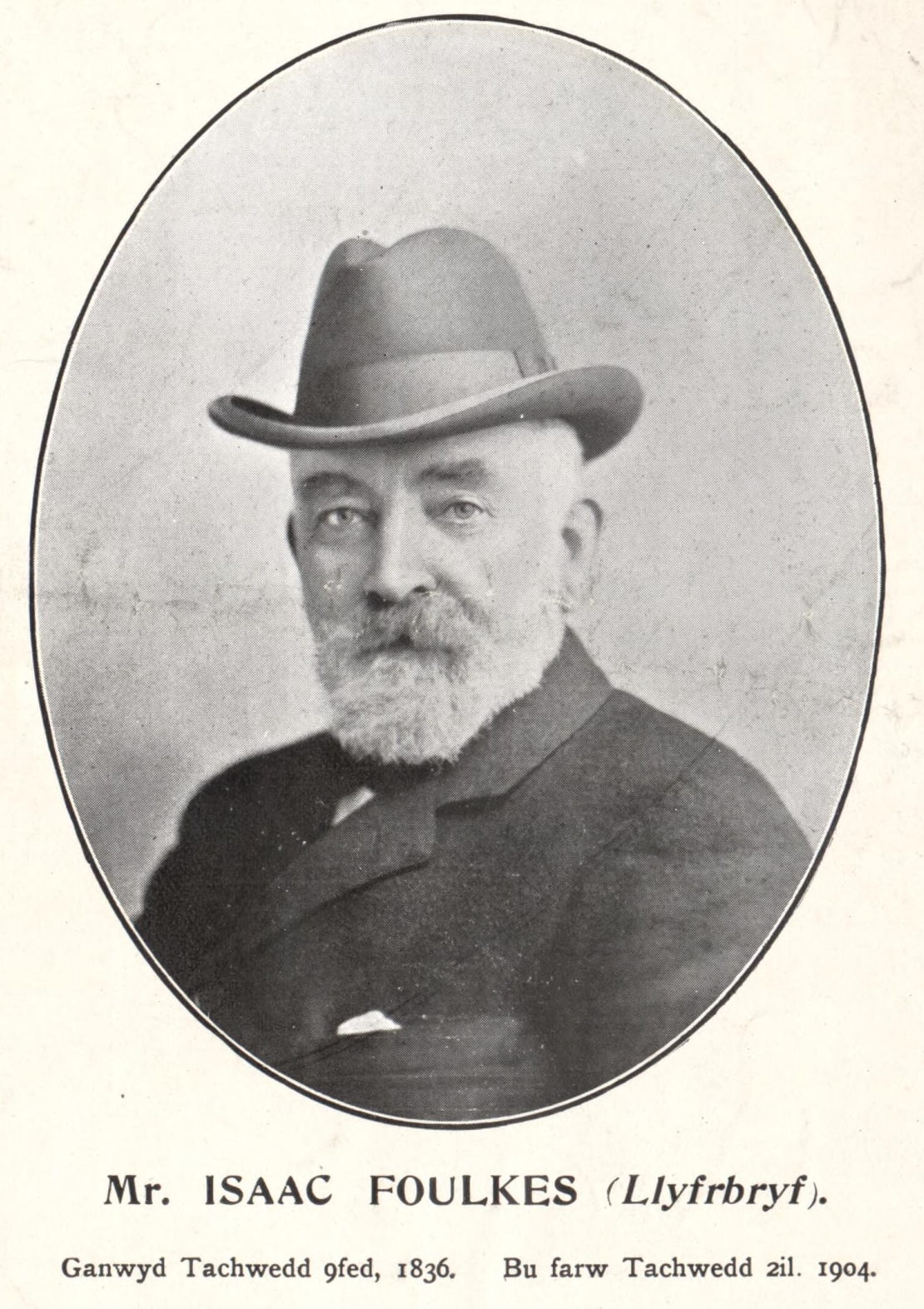
Mr. Isaac Foulkes (Llyfrbryf)

== Life ==
Born at the farm of Cwrt, Llanfwrog, Denbighshire, he was the son of Peter Foulkes and his wife Frances. At the age of fifteen he was apprenticed to Isaac Clarke, a printer in Ruthin. In 1854 he went to Liverpool, before completing his apprenticeship.

He spent some years as a compositor in the Liverpool printing office of the Welsh language newspaper Yr Amserau, and later worked in the printing works of David Marples. In 1862 he set up his own printing business in Liverpool, which he ran for the rest of his life.

In May 1890 Foulkes began to issue Y Cymro (The Welshman), a weekly newspaper in Welsh intended primarily for Liverpool Welsh readers, but soon read widely in Wales as well; he was both editor and publisher, and made the journal a literary forum.

Foulkes married twice, firstly to Hannah Foulkes, by whom he had two sons and three daughters; and secondly to Sinah Owen.

Foulkes died at Rhewl, near Ruthin, on 2 November 1904, and was buried in Llanbedr churchyard.

== Works ==
Foulkes, bardic name Llyfrbryf (Bookworm), was an author, critic, editor and publisher of Welsh-language literature. He wrote:

- Cymru Fu, folklore, pt. i. Llanidloes, 1862; pts. ii. and iii. Liverpool, 1863–4; 2nd edit. Wrexham, 1872.
- Rheinallt ap Gruffydd, novel, Liverpool, 1874.
- Y Ddau Efell, neu Llanllonydd, novel, 1875
- Memoir of the poet Ceiriog Liverpool, 1887; 2nd edit. 1902; 3rd edit. 1911.
- Memoir of the novelist, Daniel Owen, Liverpool, 1903.

He issued in 1877–88 Cyfres y Ceinion (The Gem Series), a series of reprints of Welsh classics which helped the Welsh literary revival. Works which he both edited and published are:

- Enwogion Cymru, a biographical dictionary of eminent Welshmen (Liverpool, 1870).
- The Mabinogion, with a translation into modern Welsh (1880).
- The Poetry of Trebor Mai (1883).
- Oriau Olaf, by Ceiriog (1888).

Editions of Dafydd ap Gwilym, the Iolo Manuscripts and Philip Yorke's Royal Tribes of Wales were also issued by his press.

Cymru Fu, Llanidloes 1862

Y Mabinogion Cymreig Liverpool 1880

Royal Tribes of Wales, Liverpool 1887

== Sources cited ==
- Yorke, Philip (1887). Williams, Richard (ed.). The Royal Tribes of Wales; To Which Is Added an Account of the Fifteen Tribes of North Wales. 18 Brunswick street, Liverpool: Isaac Foulkes. p. 184. OL 7211152M.
  - Reprinted 2016, Wentworth Press, ISBN 1297529936
- This article incorporates text from a publication now in the public domain: Stephen, Leslie, ed. (1887). "Foulkes, Isaac". Dictionary of National Biography. Vol. 12. London: Smith, Elder & Co.
