= Soleil Radio =

Channel Islands radio station

- United Kingdom
- Broadcast area: Jersey and Channel Islands
- Frequencies: Jersey: 107.7 MHz; Channel Islands: DAB+ 12A
- RDS: Soleil

Programming
- Language: English
- Format: Classic Hits

Ownership
- Owner: Tindle Radio
- Sister stations: Channel 103; Island FM; Midlands 103; South East Radio

History
- First air date: 1 August 2021

Technical information
- Licensing authority: Ofcom

Links
- Webcast: Radioplayer
- Website: Soleil Radio

Soleil Radio is a commercial radio station broadcasting to the Channel Islands of Jersey, Guernsey, Alderney, Sark, and Herm on DAB+ digital radio and in Jersey on 107.7FM.

It is a classic hits station, playing songs from the 1970s, 1980s, and 1990s. Soleil Radio was set up by staff at Channel 103 and Island FM to coincide with the launch of DAB in the Channel Islands. The station is owned and operated by Tindle Radio.

The station launched on 1 August 2021 and is available on DAB+, online and on mobile devices and smart speakers.

== Programming ==
Programmes are presented and produced from the Channel 103 studio in St. Helier and Island FM's studio in St. Peter Port, with presenter-led shows during peak times.

The station's presenters include:

- David Francis (Island FM Drivetime)
- Peter Mac (Channel 103 Breakfast)

Soleil Radio broadcasts hourly Channel Islands news bulletins between 7 am and 6 pm during the week, and 8am-12pm at weekends, produced by journalists at Channel 103 and Island FM.

The station positions itself as playing 'more music' than other commercial radio stations serving the Channel Islands, including a back-to-back 'Awesome 80s' weekday lunchtimes, and specialist/themed music programmes at weekends.

== See also ==
- Mass media in Jersey
- Channel 103
- Island FM
