= Woking News and Mail =

Local newspaper in Surrey, England

- Type: Weekly newspaper
- Publisher: Tindle Newspapers Limited
- Editor: Colin Channon
- Founded: 1894
- Website: wokingnewsandmail.co.uk

The Woking News and Mail is a weekly local paper, published in the Surrey village of Knaphill in Woking.

The newspaper is published every Thursday and principally covers Woking and the villages of Horsell, Chobham, Knaphill, Kingfield, Brookwood, West Byfleet, Sheerwater, Sutton Green, Woodham and Bisley.

== History ==
The Woking News and Mail has its origins in two local newspapers, launched at the end of the 19th century. The Woking News was first published on 19 October 1894 from its premises at 52 Chertsey Road, Woking. The Woking Mail followed less than a year later on 7 September 1895. The two titles were later combined into a single publication.

In 1964, the Guildford-based Surrey Advertiser purchased the Woking News and Mail. The first dedicated edition for Chobham was published the same year and the Byfleet edition started in 1969. In 1979, the Woking News and Mail was sold to the Scott Trust, part of The Guardian and Manchester Evening News group. In 2011, the Guardian Media Group decided to cease the publication of the print edition and the final Woking News and Mail was produced on 17 March of that year.

In May 2011, the Warm Welcome Group, owned by ex-Guardian and Woking News and Mail employee, Philip Davies, secured the rights to publish the paper. It has maintained a healthy editorial schedule since. In October 2016, the revived News and Mail produced its first dedicated front page for its Chobham edition, and saw its readership steadily increase between 2016 and 2019 at a time when other local and regional newspaper titles experienced a slump in sales. In October 2022, the paper was sold to British multimedia company, Tindle Newspapers, for an undisclosed sum to help strengthen its presence in the Surrey region.

== Editors ==
- Colin Channon (2023-)
- Mark Miseldine (2018-2023)
- Stuart Fliton (2017-2018)
- Rachel Saker (2016-2017)
- Tom Oxtoby (2013-2016)
- Andy Stonebridge (2011-2013)
