= Island FM =

Independent Local Radio station for Guernsey

- Guernsey
- Broadcast area: Bailiwick of Guernsey
- Frequencies: FM: 104.7 MHz (Guernsey); 93.7 MHz (Alderney); DAB: 12A (Channel Islands)
- RDS: IslandFM

Programming
- Language: English
- Format: CHR/Pop
- Network: Hits Radio Network (for sales purposes)

Ownership
- Owner: Tindle Radio
- Sister stations: Channel 103 Soleil Radio Midlands 103 South East Radio

History
- First air date: 15 October 1992

Technical information
- Licensing authority: Ofcom

Links
- Webcast: Radioplayer
- Website: Island FM

Island FM is an Independent Local Radio station broadcasting across the Bailiwick of Guernsey on 104.7 FM and 93.7 FM in Alderney.

Launched in 1992, Island FM remains the sole commercial station in the island and continues to be extremely successful with high listenership figures.

Listening figures released in February 2025 showed that out of a population of 58,000 adults, 29,000 listened each week, at an average of 13.5 hours per person giving a 39.1% market share, according to RAJAR.

== History ==
Island FM was founded by Guernsey businessman Kevin Stewart, who was the station's Managing Director until 2002.

In February 1998, Sir Ray Tindle acquired Island FM and the station became the first part of the Tindle Radio Group, which later went on to purchase Jersey's Channel 103

In late 2020, Island FM became a part of Bauer's Hits Radio Network for commercial sales. It remains owned by Tindle with some shared programming with Channel 103.

Island FM began digital radio transmissions, alongside Channel 103, on 1 August 2021 with the launch of the local Ofcom-licensed DAB multiplex for the Channel Islands.

== Programming ==
Island FM's core audience is the 15-45 age group, playing contemporary hits - predominantly from the 1990s to the present day.

News bulletins are presented locally from 6:30am until 6pm, Monday to Friday.

The station's weekend news service broadcasts local content, presented either from Jersey or Guernsey from 8am until noon. Sky News provides the service outside these times.

== Transmission ==
Island FM has broadcast on 104.7 FM in Guernsey and 93.7 FM in Alderney since launching in 1992.

The station began DAB+ transmissions, alongside those of Channel 103, on 1 August 2021 with the launch of the local Ofcom-licensed DAB multiplex for the Channel Islands. This service is radiated from transmitters at Les Touillets in Guernsey and Les Platons in Jersey.
