= Cambrian News =

Wales-based weekly newspaper

- Type: Weekly newspaper
- Format: Tabloid
- Owner: Tindle Newspaper Group
- Editor: Mick O'Reilly
- Founded: 1860
- Political alignment: Centrist
- Language: English and Welsh
- Headquarters: Aberystwyth, Wales
- Circulation: 5,685 (as of 2023)
- Website: cambrian-news.co.uk

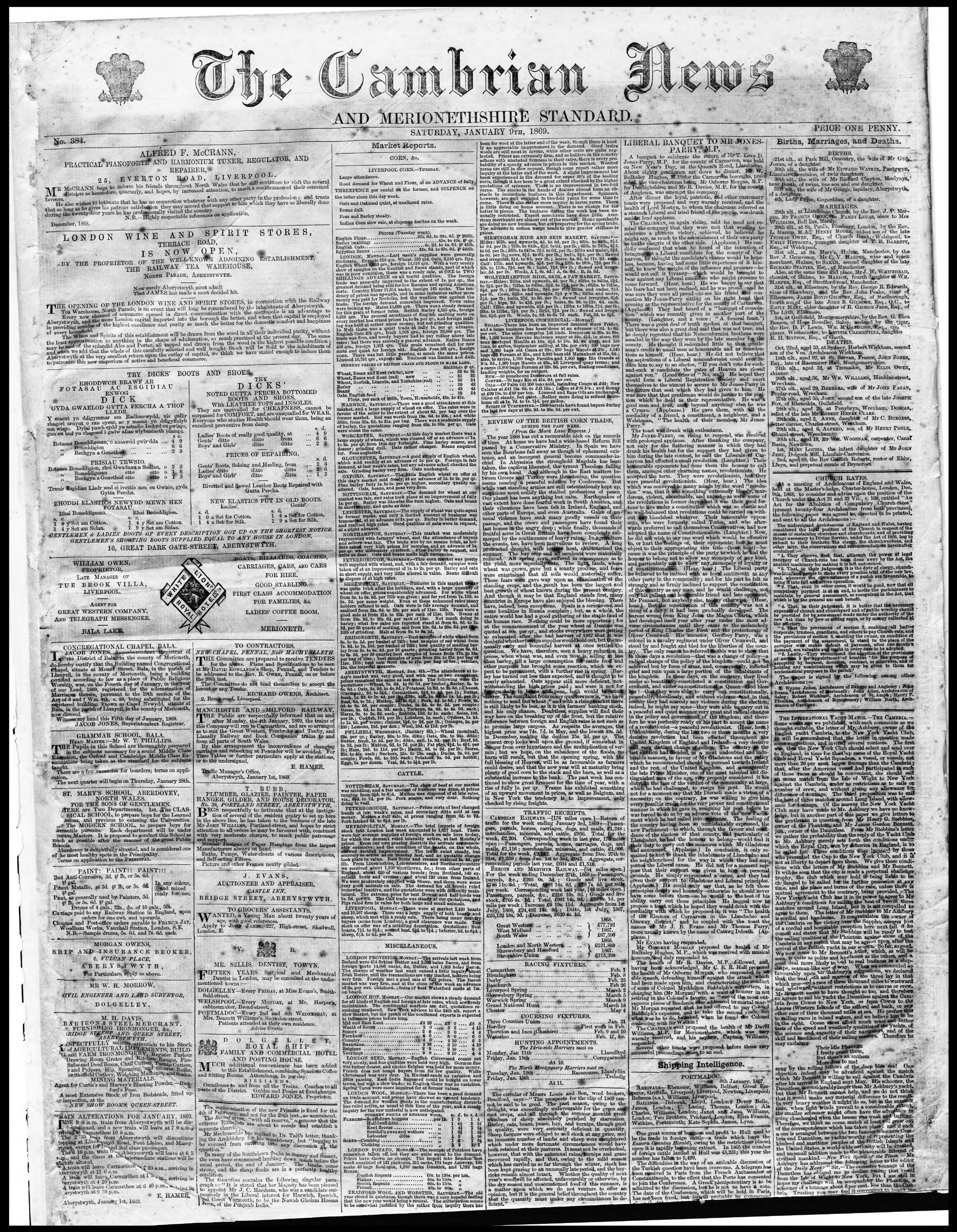
Front page of the earliest surviving copy; 9 January 1869

The Cambrian News is a weekly newspaper distributed in Wales. It was founded in 1860 and is based in Cefn Llan Science Park, Aberystwyth. Cambrian News Ltd was bought by media entrepreneur Sir Ray Tindle in 1998.

== History ==
The paper was first published in Bala in October 1860, as a four-page supplement, The Merioneth Herald, in The Oswestry Advertiser. Having subsequently become a distinct paper printed in Oswestry, England, in 1864 it became the Merionethshire Standard and Mid-Wales Herald and, in 1869, was renamed The Cambrian News and Merionethshire Standard. In 1870 it was bought by Sir John Gibson, who moved the headquarters to Aberystwyth in 1873, but kept printing in Oswestry under the masthead of The Cambrian News, Merionethshire Standard, and Aberystwyth Times.

Politically, it was a Liberal-leaning newspaper, and supported the election of the first Liberal M.P. for Merionethshire in 1868.

=== 1880-2006 ===
In May 1880, the company integrated editorial and printing in a former malthouse in Mill Street, Aberystwyth. The paper was then named The Cambrian News, Merionethshire Standard, and Welsh Farmers' Gazette. Later Gibson built a printing office and stationer's shop in Terrace Road where the paper was printed for over 60 years—well into the 20th century—before moving to Queen Street and Grays Inn Road by 1980.

In 1915 the business was sold to a new company chaired by A. E. Harrison of Cardiff as managing director and Lord Rhondda as one of its directors. In 1916 Robert Read, from the South Wales Echo was hired as managing editor. The same year it produced a unique Eisteddfod Review souvenir of the Welsh National Eisteddfod that was held in Aberystwyth. In 1917 the paper opened a successful London office which was followed by the appointment of representatives in Liverpool, Manchester and Cardiff.

In 1926, Henry Read, Robert's father, bought the paper and became managing director. In the 1930s, Robert Read became the major shareholder, managing director and managing editor. Robert was succeeded, after his death in 1946, by his son—another Henry Read—as managing director and as managing editor by D. C. Wright.

It was under his direction that, after 113 years, printing was contracted out. This enabled the move of editorial staff to the new open-plan offices on the Science Park at Llanbadarn Fawr. On the death of Henry Read, the paper was purchased by Sir Ray Tindle, whose Tindle Newspaper Group owns more than 200 weekly newspapers in Britain as of 2015.

After 146 years as a broadsheet, the paper transformed to a tabloid format in 2006.

=== 2010-present ===
As of January 2010, the Cambrian News was the second largest newspaper in Wales, with a circulation of 24,000 copies in six regional editorial versions and 60,000 weekly readers. The circulation area of mid, west and north Wales covered 3,000 square miles (7,800 km^{2}).

The paper publishes editions in Bala, Criccieth, Dolgellau, Machynlleth, Porthmadog, Pwllheli, Tywyn, the entirety of Ceredigion and parts of north Carmarthenshire and Pembrokeshire. It has offices in Aberystwyth and Porthmadog.

In April 2010, all the weekly editions of Cambrian News became available to view as an online digital newspaper on a subscription basis.

Cambrian News Ltd also publishes the Pembrokeshire weekly paper The County Echo and the seasonal Holidaymaker magazine.

== Sources ==
- Jones, Aled (1994). "Sir John Gibson and the Cambrian News" (PDF). Ceredigion. 12 (2): 57–83.
