= Tavistock Times Gazette =

- Type: Weekly newspaper
- Format: Tabloid
- Owner: Tindle
- Founded: 1857 (as Tavistock Gazette)
- Circulation: 3,505 (as of 2023)
- Website: tavistock-today.co.uk

Tavistock Times Gazette is a weekly newspaper which serves the Tavistock area in West Devon, England. It is published in tabloid format every Thursday.

The paper exists as the result of the merging of two rival papers in 1986. The Tavistock Times, founded in 1920, competed with the older Tavistock Gazette, founded in 1857, and each at various points threatened to put the other out of business.

The paper has a circulation of about 8,000 in 2007, and is owned by the Tindle Newspaper Group.
