= Radio Essex =

Radio station in Essex, England

Coordinates: 51.5330°N 0.7133°E

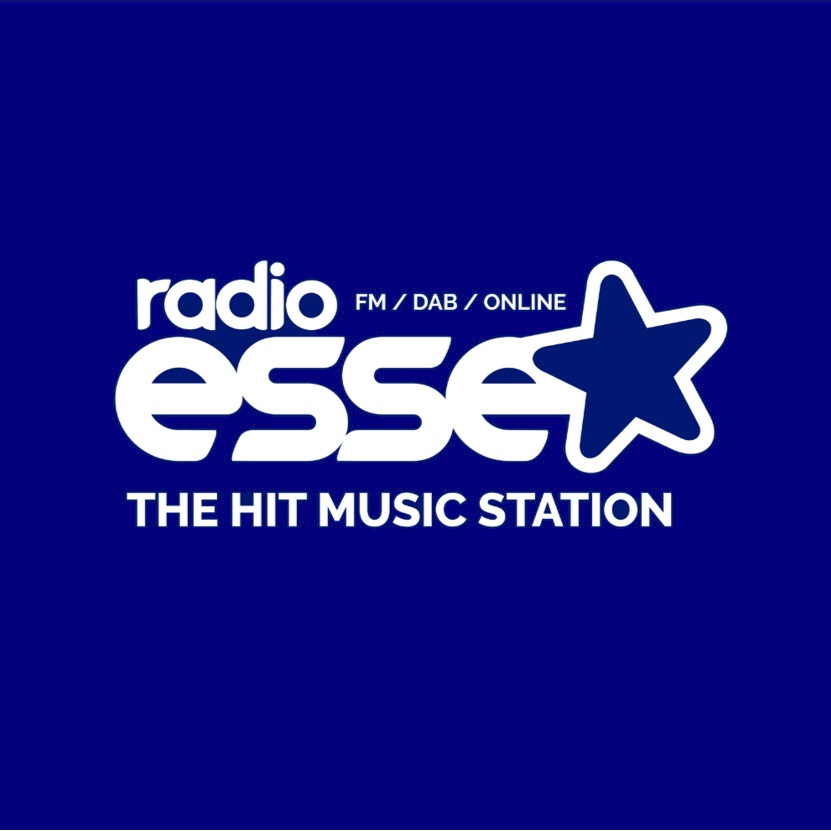
- Southend-on-Sea; England
- Broadcast area: Essex
- Frequencies: FM: 105.1 MHz (Southend-on-Sea); 107.7 MHz (Chelmsford); DAB: 12D
- RDS: RADIO SX

Programming
- Language: English
- Format: Contemporary hit radio

Ownership
- Owner: Communicorp UK

History
- First air date: 23 March 2015

Links
- Website: Radio Essex

Radio Essex is an Independent Local Radio station broadcasting to Essex, England via DAB and Mid and South Essex via FM, from studios in The Icon Building on Southend seafront, owned by Communicorp UK.

As of September 2026, the station broadcasts to a weekly audience of 49,000, according to RAJAR.

== History ==
The station until 2015, consisted of two separate stations: Chelmsford Radio and Southend Radio.

=== Chelmer ===
Chelmer FM began broadcasting on 107.7 FM in 1998, under the ownership of Mid Essex Radio Ltd. The station was re-branded twice, first in 2002 by the Tindle Radio Group as Dream 107.7 (in line with Dream 100, also owned by Tindle Radio), then again in 2009 by Adventure Radio as Chelmsford Radio.

=== Southend Radio ===
Southend Radio
- England
- Frequencies: FM: 105.1 MHz; DAB: 12D (As Radio Essex)
- RDS: Southend

Programming
- Format: Contemporary

Ownership
- Owner: Adventure Radio

History
- First air date: 28 March 2008
- Last air date: 23 March 2015

Links
- Website: southendandchelmsfordradio.com

Southend Radio began broadcasting on 105.1 FM in 2008. The station was awarded its licence to broadcast in October 2005, beating three rival bids. Southend Radio began broadcasting on 28 March 2008 after a month of test transmissions.

The station simulcasted all of its programmes with its sister station Chelmsford Radio and Radio Essex on DAB digital radio across Essex. Some programmes were also simulcast with other radio stations owned by the Adventure Radio Group. The output was made to 'sound' local by using jingles relevant to the platform that is being listened to.

The 'Essex Action' feature was a community service designed to help local groups and charities with much needed publicity and also with appeals for volunteers. The service was coordinated by the Southend Association of Volunteers (SAVS) with their counterparts across the county contributing items for broadcast.

Southend Radio was broadcast on 105.1 MHz from a transmitter located at the top of Maitland House in Southend High Street. The transmitter also broadcasts "Heart Essex". The signal on 105.1 could be heard right across Southend-on-Sea and most of south east Essex. The signal could also be heard as far away as Clacton, Maldon and also North Kent & Medway.

On 6 June 2013, Southend Radio and sister station Chelmsford Radio launched on DAB under the singular service Radio Essex. The original DAB only Radio Essex was broadcast on the Essex DAB mux and could be heard in many places across the county where Southend Radio couldn't, including Harlow, Colchester, and Sudbury (Suffolk).

Notable presenters on Southend Radio include Tracie Young and Daryl Denham.

=== Merger ===
The two radio stations began sharing programming from 2009. On 6 June 2013 the stations launched on DAB under the singular service Radio Essex. In February, 2015 it was announced that Southend Radio, along with Chelmsford Radio and Radio Essex, would be relaunched as one single station known as Radio Essex. On 23 March 2015 all three stations merged and relaunched as Radio Essex on 105.1 FM, 107.7 FM, and on DAB. From August 2017, Radio Essex flipped format from AC to a Top 40 hit music format.

== Programming ==
All programming on Radio Essex is broadcast from its studios in The Icon Building on Southend seafront.

The station broadcasts local news bulletins from 6am to 7pm on weekdays, and between 8am and midday at weekends.

Travel news is broadcast between 6am and 7pm on weekdays. There are also travel bulletins at the weekend.

== Presenters ==
Radio Essex has a diverse line up on the station, offering unique features throughout the day.

Its current presenter line-up includes: Martin Day, Chris Brooks, Ross & John, Jack Burke, Joe Kinch, Lauren Underwood, Conor Knight and Mikey Faulkner.

Some presenters also host multiple shows on the station, such as Weekend Anthems and The UK Hot 40.

During day to day programming there are points where the usual format is switched for a feature, such as the Ten at Ten and Hot 7 at 7.

== Technical ==
Radio Essex broadcasts to Southend-on-Sea on 105.1 MHz from a transmitter located at the top of Maitland House in Southend High Street.

In Chelmsford and Mid Essex, Radio Essex can be received on 107.7 MHz. This is broadcast from a mobile phone mast at Church Green in the village Danbury.

=== Analogue (FM) ===
Transmitter Site	Frequency	Power	RDS Name	PI Code	Area	County
Maitland House	105.1 MHz	500W	Radio_SX	C3A6	Southend-on-Sea, Rochford, Rayleigh, & Canvey Island	Essex
Danbury (Church Green)	107.7 MHz	390W	Radio_SX	C3A6	Chelmsford, Maldon, & South Woodham Ferrers	Essex

=== Digital (DAB) ===
Multiplex Name	Bitrate	Short Label	Long Label	SID
NOW Essex	112kbit/s	RadEssex	Radio Essex	C3D0

== See also ==
- Connect Radio 106.8
- Connect Radio 97.2 & 107.4
- Mercury 96.6
