= John Gibson (editor and journalist) =

Journalist in England and Wales

Sir John Gibson (14 February 1841–16 July 1915) was a journalist in Wales, the United Kingdom, who spent most of his career at Aberystwyth as editor of the Cambrian News. His book, The Emancipation of Women, dealt particularly with Wales.

== Early life ==
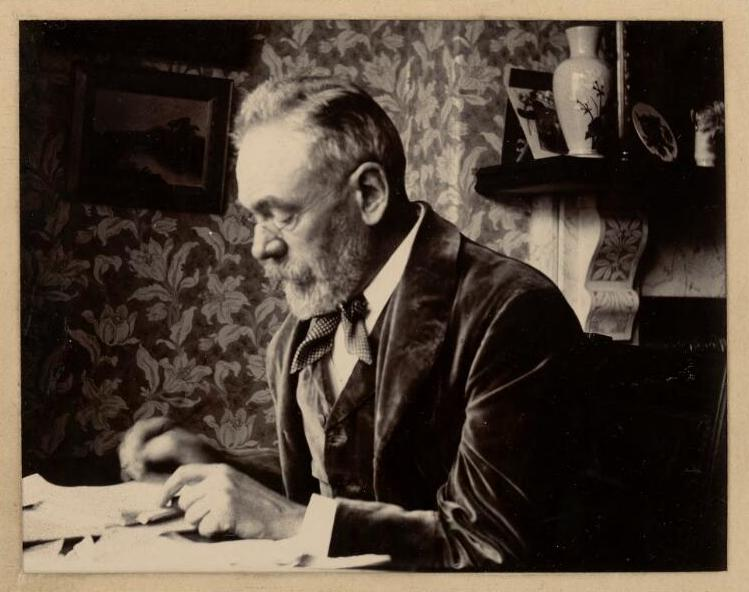
A portrait from the Welsh Portrait Collection at the National Library of Wales. Depicted person: John Gibson – English editor and journalist

Gibson was born in Lancaster, Lancashire, on 14 February 1841, the son of a hatter named John Gibson. His mother, Dorothy Gradwell, had worked in a cotton mill before her marriage and appears to have returned to the mills after the death of her husband, also named John Gibson.

Around 1863, her son John Gibson joined the Oswestry Advertiser as a printer and began to write for the paper. For the next ten years he appears to have worked as a journalist in various places in Wales and the English border counties.

== Influence ==
In September 1873, Gibson became the manager and editor of the Cambrian News at Aberystwyth, which had been established in the wake of the 1868 general elections. Its early editions had focused on allegations of evictions made in Wales at the time of those elections. In 1880, a consortium assembled by Gibson purchased the Cambrian News, and for the next thirty years it became one of the most influential weekly papers in Wales.

This owed much to Gibson's personality and independent views. As a by-product of his newspaper, his book The Emancipation of Women appeared in 1891 and was reissued in 1894. Gibson remarked in its first chapter on how "the laws of this country still treat women as the inferiors of men – as mere slave stuff. It can never be said that the work of political and social reform is finished until women are not only politically enfranchised, but are able to take their seats in both Houses of Parliament, and to hold even the highest positions in governments, trades and professions." The feminist Lady Florence Dixie enclosed The Emancipation of Women in an open letter to Prime Minister William Ewart Gladstone and other major political figures, passionately criticizing their male-supremacist assumptions and opposition to women's suffrage and commending Gibson as a "true man and real – not sham – Liberal". The letter was published in the suffragist newspaper The Woman's Herald in April 1892. Gibson was also a supporter of the atheist and secularist Charles Bradlaugh.

== Negative view ==
Thomas Jones, who was a student at University College Wales, Aberystwyth in the 1890s, described Gibson as "a stranger in an alien and narrow community, unhappy in his domestic life, lonely, and despite his large physical frame, highly sensitive. He made few friends and many enemies."

== Appreciation ==
Gibson was knighted in 1915, and died on 16 July in the same year, aged 74.

== Sources ==
- Jones, Aled (1994). "Sir John Gibson and the Cambrian News" (PDF). Ceredigion. 12 (2): 57–83.
