= Boots Ireland =

Irish subsidiary of Boots pharmacy and beauty stores

Boots Retail (Ireland) Limited
- Logo used since 2019

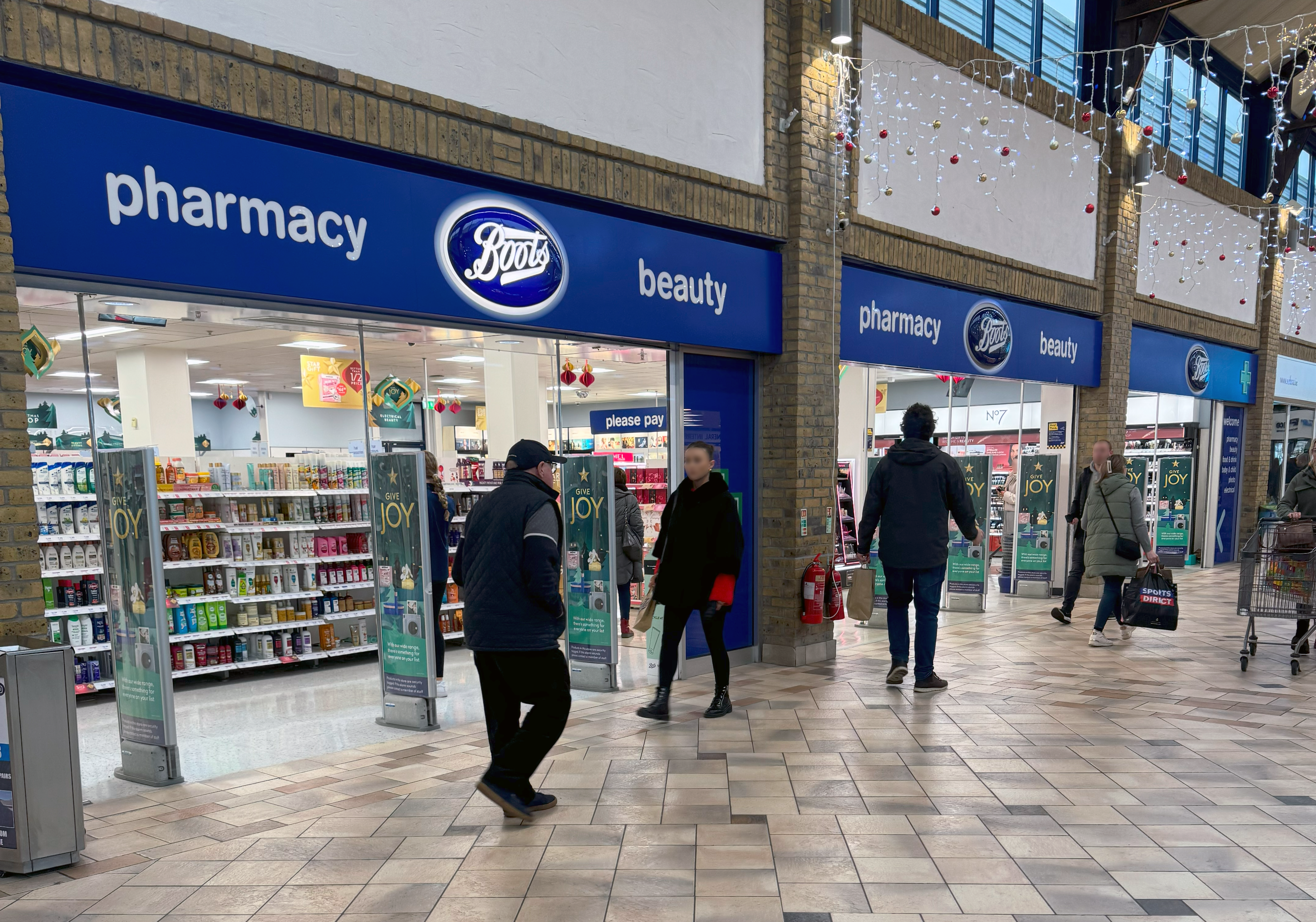
- Boots branch in Mullingar
- Trade name: Boots Ireland
- Company type: Subsidiary
- Industry: Pharmaceuticals; Healthcare; Beauty; Photography
- Founded: 5 November 2002; 23 years ago
- Headquarters: Citywest Business Campus, Dublin, Ireland
- Number of locations: 89 (2023)
- Area served: Ireland
- Key people: Stephen Watkins (Managing director)
- Number of employees: 2,000 (2023)
- Parent: Boots
- Subsidiaries: Boots Hearingcare Ireland
- Website: boots.ie

Boots Retail (Ireland) Limited is the Irish subsidiary of the British pharmacy and beauty chain, Boots. Since 1996, the chain has expanded to almost 90 stores across the Republic of Ireland.

== History ==
In 1996, Boots stated they were making a £7.6 million investment in the Republic of Ireland at an announcement in the Clarence Hotel; the first Boots store opened later that year. In 1998, the Small Firm Association recommended to Boots that they should set up a company within Ireland for the Irish market. The subsidiary was registered on 5 November 2002 as Boots Retail (Ireland) Limited.

In 2006, the parent company Boots became Alliance Boots following a merger with Alliance UniChem. In 2014, Alliance Boots merged with Walgreens to form Walgreens Boots Alliance. On 24 April 2019, Boots Hearingcare Ireland was registered as they began to provide hearing aids and free hearing tests.

In September 2020, Stephen Watkins was appointed as managing director, succeeding Bernadette Lavrery who was then appointed director of pharmacy in the parent company. In May 2021, Michelle Kearns was appointed chief information officer.

=== Stores ===
The first store in Ireland opened on 8 November 1996 in the Jervis Shopping Centre, representing an investment of £3.6 million and employing 150 people. The second store was officially opened in The Square Tallaght on 17 February 1997, creating an additional 40 jobs.

As of 2023, there are 89 stores across Ireland.

=== Partnerships ===
In 1999, they launched an asthma awareness campaign in partnership with the Asthma Association of Ireland. In 2012, Boots formed a partnership with the Irish Cancer Society to support those living with cancer in Ireland.

=== Website ===
On 14 June 2013, the website was launched, enabling customers to purchase online. In October 2014, the company created its Click and Collect service, allowing customers to pay for items online and then collect them in-store.
