= Tindle Radio =

Radio group in the British Isles

- Type: Subsidiary
- Industry: Media
- Founded: 1998; 28 years ago
- Founder: Sir Ray Tindle
- Headquarters: Farnham, Surrey, UK
- Area served: Channel Islands; Ireland; United Kingdom (until 2013)
- Key people: Danny Cammiade (CEO); Owen Tindle (Chairman)
- Parent: Tindle Group
- Website: www.tindleradio.com

Tindle Radio is a media company which owns commercial radio stations and a DAB multiplex business in the Channel Islands and Ireland. It has its head office in Farnham, Surrey, shared with Tindle Newspapers.

== History ==
Tindle Radio logo before 2024

Sir Ray Tindle acquired Island FM in Guernsey in February 1998, the first station of what was to become Tindle Radio Group. The business grew to own a dozen stations, mostly located in the South and South East of England.

Between 2007 and 2010 four stations were sold, with the final five of the UK stations - The Beach, Dream 100, North Norfolk Radio, Radio Norwich 99.9 served Norwich and Town 102 - offloaded in 2013 through a management buyout, which resulted in the formation of Anglian Radio, which four years later was sold to Celador Radio.

Tindle's last station launch in England was for Ipswich, but sold interests in new licences in Andover and Southend before they began broadcasting.

After the UK stations separated, Tindle's radio division re-organised as 'Tindle CI Broadcasting', retaining its stations in the Channel Islands and Ireland. It remains part of the larger Tindle Group.

The company launched its first digital station, Soleil Radio, on 1 August 2021. Channel 103 and Island FM also launched DAB+ simulcasts at the same time.

In 2023, the company acquired Bailiwick Broadcasting, operator of the Channel Islands' local commercial DAB multiplex.

== Radio stations ==
Tindle owns and operates three radio stations in the Channel Islands, and one in Ireland.

=== Channel 103 ===
Channel 103 is a CHR/pop music station broadcasting to the island of Jersey on 103.7 FM and DAB+ digital radio. It broadcasts contemporary hits - mostly from the early 1990s to the present day.

Local news bulletins are produced from 6am-6pm Monday-Friday and 8am-noon at weekends, with Sky News providing overnight and weekend afternoon bulletins.

According to RAJAR it has the highest weekly reach of any radio station in the British Isles at 61%.

=== Island FM ===
Island FM follows a similar CHR format to that of Channel 103. It broadcasts to the islands of Guernsey, Alderney, Sark and Herm on 104.7 & 93.7 FM as well as on DAB+ digital radio.

It broadcasts contemporary hits - mostly from the early 1990s to the present day. Local news bulletins are produced from 6am-6pm Monday-Friday and 8am-noon at weekends, with Sky News providing overnight and weekend afternoon bulletins.

=== Midlands 103 ===
Midlands 103 is the Tindle Group's only investment in Ireland. It broadcasts on a range of frequencies between 95.7 and 103.5 FM across Counties Laois, Offaly and Westmeath.

It includes a varied output of mainstream music shows, topical talk and discussion and specialist programmes - including Country and Irish music, business news, and Irish language shows.

The station produces its local news bulletins for the region during peak times, with evening (7pm to midnight) network bulletins produced by Bauer Media Audio Ireland.

=== Soleil Radio ===
Soleil Radio launched in August 2021 as an easy-listening DAB digital radio station for the Channel Islands. In 2023 the format was refreshed and it now plays classic hits from the 1970s, 80s and 90s with hourly news bulletins produced from the Channel 103 or Island FM newsrooms from 7am-6pm weekdays and 8am-12pm at weekends. In August 2023, Soleil Radio gained an FM frequency for Jersey, 107.7FM.

== Former stations ==
During the 2010s, Tindle's former stations which broke away to form Anglian Radio were sold on again to Celador and later Bauer. They were rebranded as Greatest Hits Radio in 2020.

- Kick FM - local radio station for West Berkshire, broadcast from Newbury (sold to Andover Sound in 2009, now Greatest Hits Radio)
- Delta Radio - local radio station for East Hampshire, South West Surrey and North West Sussex (merged with Kestrel FM in 2010, now Greatest Hits Radio)
- Bridge FM - local radio station for Bridgend County, South Wales (sold to Town and Country Broadcasting in 2007)
- Dream 107.2 - local radio station for Central Hampshire, broadcast from The Brooks Shopping Centre in Winchester. Previously known as 107.2 Win FM. (rebranded as The Breeze, later Hits Radio South Coast and now Easy Radio South Coast)
- Kestrel FM - local radio station for North Hampshire, broadcast from studios in Festival Place Shopping Centre in Basingstoke. (rebranded as The Breeze and later Greatest Hits Radio)
- Dream 107.7 - local radio station for Chelmsford (sold to Adventure Radio in September 2008, now Radio Essex)
- Dream 100 FM - local radio station for North Essex and South Suffolk (became Greatest Hits Radio in 2020)
- 99.9 Radio Norwich - local radio station for Norwich (became Greatest Hits Radio in 2020)
- The Beach - local radio station for Great Yarmouth, Lowestoft and Southwold (became Greatest Hits Radio in 2020)
- Town 102 - local radio station for the Ipswich area (became Greatest Hits Radio in 2020)
- North Norfolk Radio - local radio station for North Norfolk (became Greatest Hits Radio in 2020)
