= Llanfwrog, Denbighshire =

Village in Denbighshire, Wales

Coordinates: 53.107°N 3.323°W

Llanfwrog
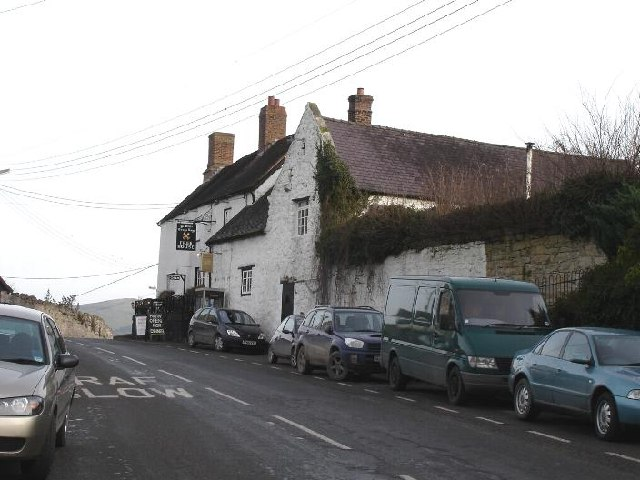
- Llanfwrog

- Location within Denbighshire
- OS grid reference: SJ113575
- Community: Ruthin
- Principal area: Denbighshire
- Preserved county: Clwyd
- Country: Wales
- Sovereign state: United Kingdom
- Post town: RUTHIN
- Postcode district: LL15
- Dialling code: 01824
- Police: North Wales
- Fire: North Wales
- Ambulance: Welsh
- UK Parliament: Clwyd East
- Senedd Cymru – Welsh Parliament: Clwyd West

Llanfwrog is a village in Denbighshire, in northern Wales. It hosts a church, Llanfwrog Church of St Mwrog and St Mary. The sturdy medieval tower of St Mwrog's crowns the hill west of Ruthin, marking the point where town gives way to countryside. ‘Double-naved’ in the distinctive Clwydian style, the church is late medieval, but was much altered by Victorian restoration. The church was again restored in 1999. There are fine views from the circular 'Celtic' churchyard – St Mwrog was a little-known Welsh saint, perhaps from Anglesey. On a rise to the south by the road to Efenechtyd stands an ancient thatched and whitewashed house (private).

The church is generally open daily, from mid-morning to late afternoon.

== Notes ==
As of 28 April 2011, this article is derived in whole or in part from medieval-wales.com/index.php. The copyright holder has licensed the content in a manner that permits reuse under CC BY-SA 3.0 and GFDL. All relevant terms must be followed. The original text was at "Llanelidan"
