= South East Radio =

- South East Radio logo
- Ireland
- Broadcast area: South East Region
- Frequency: 95.6, 96.2, 96.4 MHz

Programming
- Format: Adult contemporary, talk

Ownership
- Owner: Midlands 103 (Tindle Radio)

History
- First air date: 20 October 1989

Links
- Website: www.southeastradio.ie

South East Radio is an Irish radio station based in County Wexford, broadcasting at 95.6; 96.2, and 96.4 MHz. The station also broadcasts on the same frequencies into adjoining counties - including Wicklow, Carlow, Kilkenny and Waterford. South East Radio's studios are in a 19th-century Georgian-styled former bank branch, located on the quays of Wexford Town.

== History ==
Originally operating as a pirate radio station under the name 'Slaneyside', those responsible for the station successfully bid for a single available broadcast licence during the late 1980s. The winning consortium (who were in competition with another pirate station named "Community Radio Wexford") were awarded the licence following an application and oral presentation. These were given in Waterford on 27 April 1989. The station launched on 20 October 1989. The station was initially assigned 99.2FM by the then Independent Radio and Television Commission (IRTC), as this frequency was assigned to Mount Leinster. The station changed its name from 'Slaneyside' to 'South East Radio' during the summer of 1989 - prior to the launch. RTÉ broadcaster Noel Andrews joined the organisation briefly to assist in the setting up the station.

Presenter Tony Scott during an outside broadcast, Christmas 2006

The station started broadcasting on a 24-hour-a-day basis on 2 December 1989. South East Radio moved to 95.6 MHz before the launch of RTÉ Lyric FM.

As of 2018, the South East Radio is overseen by managing director Eamonn Buttle, who had been an original founder of the station in 1989.
