= Connect Radio 106.8 =

Coordinates: 52.5598°N 0.2302°W

Connect FM (Peterborough)
- Peterborough; England
- Broadcast area: North-east Cambridgeshire, south Lincolnshire
- Frequency: 106.8 FM
- RDS: CONNECT

Programming
- Format: Contemporary

Ownership
- Owner: Communicorp

History
- First air date: 24 July 1999
- Last air date: 1 October 2019

Links
- Website: www.connectfm.com

Connect FM Peterborough (formerly 106.8 Lite FM) was an Independent Local Radio station serving Peterborough, The Deepings, Crowland, Spalding, Yaxley, Whittlesey & Stamford on 106.8FM and online at www.connectfm.com.

== History ==
Previous logo

The station launched as Lite FM 10:00am on Saturday 24 July 1999 with a live outside broadcast in Cathedral Square. The first song played was 'So Good' by Boyzone. The first scheduled programme was Saturday Sport, with Neil Evans & Keith Hazelton. Lite rebranded to Connect in 2010 and moved from the city centre to the then Connect Northants territory of Kettering.

In February 2019, the station was sold to Communicorp with the station to be rebranded as Smooth East Midlands depending on Ofcom approval. Smooth took over broadcasting on 1 October 2019.

=== Ownership ===
The station was owned by Communicorp.

=== On air ===
The station broadcast locally focused information and entertainment for the Peterborough area with dedicated local news, travel news and a wide choice of music for the city. Amongst the presenters during the final months as Connect were Liz Jeeves, Paul Lovett, Mikey Faulkner, Murray J and Daniel Fox - alongside long-serving Connect FM news journalist Carlo Fiorentino. The transmitter is situated at Gunthorpe just off Paston Parkway on 106.8 FM. The station was also on DAB, smart speaker and online.
