= Ray Tindle =

British newspaper owner (1926–2022)

Sir Ray Tindle CBE DL
- Born: Raymond Stanley Tindle; 8 October 1926; Streatham, London, England
- Died: 16 April 2022 (aged 95); Farnham, Surrey, England
- Citizenship: United Kingdom
- Known for: Tindle Newspapers; Tindle Radio
- Spouse: Beryl Tindle
- Children: 1

Sir Raymond Stanley Tindle CBE DL (8 October 1926 – 16 April 2022) was a British newspaper and radio entrepreneur. He founded the Tindle Group of regional newspapers and radio stations.

== Early life ==
Raymond Stanley Tindle was born at a nursing home in Streatham, London, England on 8 October 1926. After leaving school he went on to enlist in the 1st Battalion Devonshire Regiment, an infantry regiment in the British Army. He saw service in the Far East between 1944 and 1947, rising to the rank of captain. After wartime service he bought his first newspaper, the Tooting & Balham Gazette with his £250 (equivalent to £8,457 in 2025) demob payment.

== Career ==
Tindle continued acquiring newspapers over the decades that followed, operating them as local titles. At its peak, the Tindle Group owned more than 220 publications. Tindle Newspapers Ltd now owns local papers and radio stations covering large parts of Wales, Surrey, Hampshire, Essex, Somerset, Devon and Cornwall, Ireland, the Channel Isles and the Isle of Man. Tindle attributed a great deal of the company's success to the fact it had always remained debt free. In the 1970s, Tindle was an early investor in Capital Radio. In 1998, he sold back his shares in the company to buy Island FM in Guernsey, the first local station to form part of the Tindle Radio group.

He retired as chairman of the Surrey Advertiser in 1977 after 35 years and also as a director for 18 years on the main board of The Guardian & Manchester Evening News. He was chairman for ten years of the Belfast News Letter, the UK's oldest provincial daily. Tindle was elected president of the Newspaper Society – the industry's highest honour – in 1971, and was its honorary treasurer for 14 years. He completed 50 years of involvement with the Newspaper Society in 2002. He was the founder chairman of the Weekly Newspaper Bureau and also a past president of the Wessex Newspaper Association, of the Greater London Newspaper Association and of the Young Newspaperman's Association. He was a Fellow of the Chartered Institute of Arbitrators, a Fellow of the Chartered Institute of Journalists, and a member of the Guild of Editors. Tindle became Master of the Worshipful Company of Stationers and Newspaper Makers in 1985 after some 20 years of service on several committees and of the Court.

In 2017, Tindle stepped down as chairman of the company at the age of 90. He was succeeded by his son Owen, but remained the group's president until his death.

== Death ==
Tindle died at his home in Farnham, Surrey, on 16 April 2022, aged 95.

== Awards ==
Tindle was appointed a Commander of the Order of the British Empire (CBE) in the 1987 Birthday Honours and was knighted in 1994 for services to the newspaper industry.

Tindle was an Honorary Fellow of the Surrey Institute of Art & Design which became the University for the Creative Arts, a Doctor of Letters at the University of Buckingham and was admitted to the Degree of Doctor at the University of Surrey in 2008.
