= 2014 in British radio =

This is a list of events in British radio during 2014.

== Events ==
=== January ===
- 1 January – Jazz FM stops broadcasting on the national Digital One multiplex, but continues to be available on DAB in London, online and through satellite television. Its Digital One slot is temporarily taken over by the return of Birdsong Radio, with plans for a permanent replacement in February.
- 2 January – The morning's edition of BBC Radio 4's Today is guest edited by musician PJ Harvey, with items includes a Thought for the Day from WikiLeaks founder Julian Assange and a segment in which John Pilger criticises US President Barack Obama for not closing the Guantanamo Bay detention camp. The content prompts Labour MP Ian Austin to brand it as the programme's worst ever edition.
- 3 January – Former Radio 1 and GEM-AM presenter Jenni Costello joins internet station Solid Gold Gem to present Ready, Steady 80s, a weekly programme dedicated to hits from the decade.
- 6 January – It had been reported on 30 December 2013 that Hot Radio would close at 18:00, but the station remains on air after the deadline had passed.
- 8 January – Smooth Radio announces that weekend breakfast presenter Daryl Denham has left the station with immediate effect. His shows will be taken over by Emma B on Saturdays and Eamonn Kelly on Sundays.
- 9 January – Blur drummer Dave Rowntree begins hosting a Thursday evening show for XFM.
- 10 January – Liverpool-based stations City Talk 105.9 and Radio City 96.7 both broadcast exclusive interviews with Prime Minister David Cameron.
- 10 January – Radio 1 announces a schedule change that will see weekend breakfast presenter Gemma Cairney and weekday early breakfast host Dev swap shows.
- 14 January – Talksport secures a deal with the Daily Mail to produce content featuring sports journalists and writers from the newspaper, including Jamie Redknapp, Martin Keown and Graham Poll.
- 16 January – BBC Radio Northampton Breakfast Show presenter Stuart Linnell receives hospital treatment after he is hit by a police car shortly before he is due to go on air.
- 19 January – Radio 1's YouTube channel attracts its one millionth subscriber.
- 20 January – Global Radio is found to be in breach of their license remit for Heart Cornwall after a listener complained to Ofcom that there was not enough local news and speech to make it a fully local station.
- 24 January – Heart London presenters Jamie Theakston and Emma Bunton present their breakfast show from a listener's house in Buckinghamshire as part of a Sky promotion.
- 29 January
  - Classic FM presenter John Suchet opens The Classic FM Foundation Lecture Room at the headquarters of London-based music therapy charity Nordoff-Robbins.
  - Free Radio announces that Pat Sharp will present a special edition of its Guess the Year show for a week in February, his first on air appearance since leaving Smooth Radio in December 2013.
- 31 January – BBC Radio 4 decides to "rest" the Archers spin-off Ambridge Extra, which has been on air since 2011.

=== February ===
- 4 February – The Radio Today website reports that Ofcom have given Global Radio permission to remove Smooth Radio from the Digital One platform, and replace it with a new national station. Under the agreement, Smooth will continue to air on its regional FM frequencies, but with a greater local output.
- 6 February – Global Radio sells eight of its regional stations to Irish media holdings firm Communicorp.
- 11 February – LBC launches nationally on the Digital One platform, dropping "97.3" from its name and adopting the slogan "Leading Britain's Conversation", taking over the slot formerly occupied by Jazz FM. The station also secures a sponsorship deal with the Financial Times.
- 13 February – Disc jockey Dave Lee Travis is found not guilty on 12 accounts of historical sexual offences following a trial at Southwark Crown Court. However, after the jury could not reach a decision on another two charges, it is announced on 24 February that he will face a retrial on the remaining allegations. On 28 March, it is announced he will face charges on another count.
- 14 February – Free Radio hosts a wedding for two dogs to mark Valentine's Day.
- 17 February – Speaking at the Radio Academy, Head of Music at Radio 1, George Ergatoudis, says that streaming will be included in the top 40 singles chart.
- 24 February – Plans are announced for Smooth Radio's relaunch, which will begin from 3 March. The changes will see the departure of several presenters, including Simon Bates and Lynn Parsons, while Andrew Castle, Kate Garraway and Myleene Klass will join the lineup. Castle will be the station's new breakfast presenter in London, while Garraway will take over Parsons' mid-morning show. Klass will present a weekend show.
- 25 February – Community station The Cat is awarded a five-year licence by Ofcom to broadcast to Nentwich and Crewe in Cheshire.

=== March ===
- 3 March
  - Radio 1 presenter Nick Grimshaw leaves his breakfast show early to attend hospital for an X-ray after swallowing glass while drinking a cup of coffee. Fearne Cotton presents the remainder of the programme, while Grimshaw is discharged following treatment.
  - Radio Today reports that London Turkish Radio is in serious continuous breach of its Ofcom licence after it ceased broadcasting following a power cut in October 2013.
  - A "technical error" leads to sound effects being broadcast over a news item about the trial of South African Olympic athlete Oscar Pistorius on BBC Coventry & Warwickshire.
- 5 March – Mark Lawson will step down as presenter of Radio 4's Front Row after 16 years, it is announced.
- 7–8 March – Radio 1 marks International Women's Day with two nights of an all-female line-up from 7 pm to 7 am, featuring presenters like Annie Nightingale and Adele Roberts. The second night is also aired on 1Xtra.
- 12 March – Sky News host Kay Burley will join The Sun's Stig Abell to host a Sunday morning magazine programme for LBC from 23 March.
- 14 March – Global Radio announces that Gold will become a non-stop music service, with the exception of the breakfast show and Saturday's Vinyl Heaven. Presenters Paul Coyte, Eamonn Kelly, Dean Martin and Andy Peebles are also dropped from the network.
- 15 March – Singer Lily Allen guest presents Dermot O'Leary's Saturday show on BBC Radio 2.
- 18 March – In an interview with BBC Radio 5 Live's Richard Bacon, former Radio 1 presenter Noel Edmonds talks of his desire to buy the BBC and turn it into a not-for-profit broadcaster, while scrapping BBC Local Radio.
- 18 March – BBC Radio Sussex and BBC Radio Surrey have hired David Jensen, David Hamilton and Jeni Barnett to cover some of their shows in March and April.
- 21 March – Cyclist Sir Bradley Wiggins makes a cameo appearance in Radio 4's The Archers as part of the BBC's Sport Relief celebrations.
- 24 March
  - Smooth Radio returns to airing local output on its regional frequencies, with local programming for Breakfast and Drivetime, and a raft of new presenters joining the network.
  - Smooth Radio replaces Gold on MW across southern England.
- 26 March – LBC airs a studio debate between Deputy Prime Minister Nick Clegg and UK Independence Party leader Nigel Farage discussing Britain's future in Europe ahead of May's elections to the European Parliament.
- 28 March – BBC Radio 5 Live celebrates its 20th anniversary.
- 30 March – More than 600 editions of Alistair Cooke's Letter from America from the 1970s, thought to have been lost, are recovered from cassette recordings made by two listeners.
- 31 March – Radio Caroline North returns for a month to celebrate its 50th birthday, broadcasting from a lightship in Liverpool's Albert Dock.

=== April ===
- 1 April – Insight Radio launches on Freeview channel 730.
- 4 April – Real XS Glasgow closes at midnight, and is rebranded as Xfm Scotland from 7 April.
- 6 April – Smooth Radio launches a multi-million ad campaign featuring Michael Bublé.
- 7–10 April – As part of the BBC's celebration of the 20th anniversary of Britpop, Steve Lamacq and Jo Whiley present a week of Radio 1's long running The Evening Session on BBC Radio 2.
- 9 April – Sajid Javid is appointed as Culture Secretary following the resignation of Maria Miller.
- 15 April – Classic FM dedicates an entire 24 hours of its music to the recordings of Sir Neville Marriner to celebrate his 90th birthday.
- 21 April – The Lark Ascending, composed by Ralph Vaughan Williams, voted Britain's favourite piece of classical music by listeners of Classic FM.

=== May ===
- 1 May – The BBC will provide radio, television and online coverage of the Hay Literary Festival in June, it is announced, as it takes over broadcast rights for the event from Sky Arts.
- 6 May
  - Real Radio is rebranded as Heart.
  - Following the launch of Heart North Wales, Capital North West and Wales replaces the former Heart station Heart North Wales & West which had broadcast to Cheshire, the Wirral Peninsula and North Wales.
- 9 May – BBC Radio Manchester and BBC Radio 5 Live are taken off air when fire alarms are activated at the BBC's Salford studios.
- 11 May – BBC Radio Devon presenter David Lowe has lost his "Singers and Swingers" slot after playing a 1932 version of "The Sun Has Got His Hat On" by Ambrose & His Orchestra that includes the n-word, it is reported. Lowe, who had not realised the song contained the word, offered to give an on-air apology or "fall on [his] sword" after a viewer complained, the latter of which was accepted. The BBC says the incident could have been handled better. Lowe was offered his job back, but declined citing stress over the incident. The incident follows recent controversy over Jeremy Clarkson's use of the same word while recording an episode of Top Gear, which led to him receiving a final warning from the Corporation.
- 16 May – An LBC interview with UK Independence Party leader Nigel Farage is interrupted by his spin doctor, Patrick O'Flynn after the latter believed it had overrun. During the interview Farage is questioned about comments he made concerning his discomfort with hearing foreign languages spoken in the UK given that his wife is German, and whether he would sign his party up to an expenses audit process.

=== June ===
- 6 June – Surrey Hills Community Radio based in Leatherhead begins live broadcasting on the internet at 7pm
- 13 June – Simon Hirst hosts the final edition of Hirsty's Daily Dose on Capital Yorkshire after 11½ years.

=== July ===
- 1 July – BBC Radio 5 Live announces the departure of Richard Bacon, Victoria Derbyshire and Shelagh Fogarty, who will leave when the station's schedule is overhauled in the autumn.
- 7 July – Emma Barnett, women's editor of The Daily Telegraph will join BBC Radio 5 Live.
- 20 July – BBC Three television launches mockumentary sitcom People Just Do Nothing based around Kurupt FM, a fictitious pirate radio station broadcasting UK garage and drum and bass music from Brentford in West London.
- 25 July – Actress Eleanor Bron has joined The Archers as Carol Tregorran, a character who last appeared in the series 60 years ago, BBC News reports.

=== August ===
- 11 August – First broadcast of semi-autobiographical sitcom The Cold Swedish Winter on BBC Radio 4, written by Danny Robins, concerning an expatriate English stand-up comedian and recorded on location in Sweden including Swedish actors.
- 15 August – Jonathan Ross will return to BBC Radio 2 for the first time in four years when he sits in for Steve Wright from 26 to 29 August.

=== September ===
- 1 September – Peter Horrocks will step down as Director of the BBC World Service and leave the Corporation in early 2015, it is announces.
- 15 September – The Jazz FM schedule receives an overhaul, which includes an hour of specialist jazz programmes each day, and Lynn Parsons taking over as presenter of The Jazz Breakfast.
- 29 September – Sky Sports News Radio has ceased broadcasting, it is reported, its content having been subsumed into Sky Sports.
- Undated in September – The specialist output on MFR (Moray Firth Radio) ends and is replaced by networked content from Bauer's 'Greatest Hits Network' of Scottish AM stations.

=== October ===
- 6 October – Schedule changes at BBC Radio 5 Live are rolled out, and see Adrian Chiles take on the mid morning show, and Dan Walker and Sarah Brett taking on afternoons.
- 11 October – During an interview on BBC Radio 5 Live with Stephen Nolan, Stephanie Hirst reveals she is in the process of gender transition from male to female. This being one of the reasons why she left her show Hirsty's Daily Dose on Capital Yorkshire earlier in 2014.
- 15 October – Launch of the BBC Genome Project, an online resource allowing users to browse through back copies of the Radio Times from 1923 to 2009, including television and radio listings.
- 20 October – Ofcom reprimands BBC Radio 1 for breaking the broadcasting guidelines after Lily Allen and Ed Sheeran swore on air during the Big Weekend festival in May.
- 22 October – Former Radio 1 presenter Mike Read requests the withdrawal of "UKIP Calypso", a song he wrote in support of the UK Independence Party after complaints that it was racist. The song featured Read singing in praise of the party using a fake Caribbean accent.
- 22 October – The BBC issues an apology after Michael Buerk criticised the victim in the Ched Evans rape case during a trailer for the evening's edition of Radio 4's The Moral Maze.
- 27 October – Richard Allinson joins Magic 105.4 FM to present the weekday drive-time show.
- 31 October – BBC Radio 4 begins broadcasting an occasional series of re-recordings of lost episodes of 1950s radio sitcom Hancock's Half Hour under the banner The Missing Hancocks, produced by Neil Pearson and Ed Morrish. The initial five scripts have been selected by Galton and Simpson, the original writers, and were recorded in their presence, with Kevin McNally taking the part of Tony Hancock, in April.

=== November ===
- 7 November – The Radio Academy announces the discontinuation of its annual Radio Academy Awards after three decades. The Awards had been sponsored by Sony until 2013.
- 10 November – BBC Radio 1 is censured by Ofcom after an edition of its Newsbeat programme aired in June that included an interview with a British-born jihadist in which he compared his membership of Islamic State to the video game Call of Duty. The regulator felt the comments had no context.
- 14 November
  - World War II Royal Navy test pilot Eric "Winkle" Brown appears as a guest on the 3000th edition of Desert Island Discs.
  - Former BBC DJ Chris Denning pleads guilty to further sexual abuse of boys aged nine to sixteen during the 1970s and 1980s.
- 15 November – Smooth Christmas returns to DAB in preparation for the launch of a new station with the Smooth brand.
- 19 November – BBC Radio Norfolk presenter Nick Conrad apologises following comments he made about rape during a live debate about footballer and convicted rapist Ched Evans.
- 20 November – Vanessa Feltz, Jo Whiley, Trevor Nelson and Nicky Campbell are among several presenters to be inducted into the Radio Academy Hall of Fame.
- 27 November – BBC Radio 4 will air a 10-hour adaptation of Leo Tolstoy's War and Peace on New Year's Day 2015, the BBC confirms.
- 28 November – Guest editors are announced for BBC Radio 4's The Today Programme over the festive season. They will include comedian Lenny Henry, House of Commons Speaker John Bercow and Mervyn King, the former Governor of the Bank of England.
- 30 November – The online classic hits station Solid Gold Gem ceases broadcasting after two years on air.

=== December ===
- 2 December – BBC Radio Devon announces that Simon Bates will join the station to present the breakfast show from January 2015.
- 7 December – Comedian Tom Binns apologises to his wife, radio producer Liesl Soards, after he read out the contents of an email exchange she had with Simon Bates while the two were working at Smooth Radio, then described Bates as being "as focused as a cunt". Binns had been commenting on Bates forthcoming Radio Devon show.
- 15 December – Solid Gold Gem is relaunched with Len Groat as its new manager after closing down two weeks earlier. No reason is given for the hiatus.
- 27 December – Launch of Smooth Extra on DAB.
- 30 December – Papers released by the National Archives reveal that in September 1979 Margaret Thatcher considered introducing advertising for some BBC radio services, but later scrapped the idea after encountering opposition.

== Station debuts ==
- 7 April – Xfm Scotland
- 6 June – Surrey Hills Community Radio in Leatherhead
- 27 December – Smooth Extra
- Unknown – London One Radio

== Programme debuts ==
- 19 February– Thanks a Lot, Milton Jones! on BBC Radio 4 (2014–2022)
- 2 April – Bunk Bed on BBC Radio 4 (2014–Present)
- 29 May – Plum House on BBC Radio 4 (2014–2020)
- 4 August – Home Front on BBC Radio 4 (2014–2018)
- 11 August – The Cold Swedish Winter on BBC Radio 4 (2014–2021)
- 10 October – Friday Sports Panel on BBC Radio 5 Live (2014–Present)

== Relaunching this year after a break of one month or more ==
- 15 November – Smooth Christmas (2011, 2012, 2014)

== Returning this year after a break of one year or longer ==
- 30 July – Dead Ringers returning to BBC Radio 4 (2000–2007, 2014–Present)

== Continuing radio programmes ==
=== 1940s ===
- The Sunday Hour (1940–2018)
- Desert Island Discs (1942–Present)
- Woman's Hour (1946–Present)
- A Book at Bedtime (1949–Present)

=== 1950s ===
- The Archers (1950–Present)
- The Today Programme (1957–Present)

=== 1960s ===
- Farming Today (1960–Present)
- In Touch (1961–Present)
- The World at One (1965–Present)
- The Official Chart (1967–Present)
- Just a Minute (1967–Present)
- The Living World (1968–Present)
- The Organist Entertains (1969–2018)

=== 1970s ===
- PM (1970–Present)
- Start the Week (1970–Present)
- You and Yours (1970–Present)
- I'm Sorry I Haven't a Clue (1972–Present)
- Good Morning Scotland (1973–Present)
- Newsbeat (1973–Present)
- File on 4 (1977–Present)
- Money Box (1977–Present)
- The News Quiz (1977–Present)
- Feedback (1979–Present)
- The Food Programme (1979–Present)
- Science in Action (1979–Present)

=== 1980s ===
- Steve Wright in the Afternoon (1981–1993, 1999–2022)
- In Business (1983–Present)
- Sounds of the 60s (1983–Present)
- Loose Ends (1986–Present)

=== 1990s ===
- The Moral Maze (1990–Present)
- Essential Selection (1991–Present)
- Essential Mix (1993–Present)
- Up All Night (1994–Present)
- Wake Up to Money (1994–Present)
- Private Passions (1995–Present)
- In Our Time (1998–Present)
- Material World (1998–Present)
- Scott Mills (1998–2022)
- The Now Show (1998–Present)

=== 2000s ===
- BBC Radio 2 Folk Awards (2000–Present)
- Big John @ Breakfast (2000–Present)
- Sounds of the 70s (2000–2008, 2009–Present)
- Kermode and Mayo's Film Review (2001–2022)
- A Kist o Wurds (2002–Present)
- Fighting Talk (2003–Present)
- Jeremy Vine (2003–Present)
- Annie Mac (2004–2021)
- Fearne Cotton (2009–2015)
- Elaine Paige on Sunday (2004–Present)
- The Bottom Line (2006–Present)
- The Christian O'Connell Breakfast Show (2006–Present)
- The Unbelievable Truth (2006–Present)
- Radcliffe & Maconie (2007–Present)
- Geoff Lloyd's Hometime Show (2008–2017)
- The Media Show (2008–Present)
- Newsjack (2009–Present)
- Paul O'Grady on the Wireless (2009–2022)
- Alan and Mel's Summer Escape (2009–2020)

=== 2010s ===
- Weekend Wogan (2010–2015)
- The Chris Evans Breakfast Show (2010–2018)
- Graham Norton (2010–2020)
- Simon Mayo Drivetime (2010–2018)
- The Third Degree (2011–Present)
- BBC Radio 1's Dance Anthems (2012–Present)
- Late Night Graham Torrington (2012–2020)
- The Radio 1 Breakfast Show with Nick Grimshaw (2012–2018)
- Sounds of the 80s (2013–Present)
- Question Time Extra Time (2013–Present)
- The Show What You Wrote (2013–Present)

== Ending this year ==
- 21 March – Simon Bates at Breakfast (2011–2014)

== Closing this year ==
| Date | Station | Debut(s) |
|---|---|---|
| 4 April | Real XS Glasgow | 2007 |
| 27 December | Smooth Christmas | 2011, 2012, 2014 |

== Deaths ==
- 5 January – Simon Hoggart, 67, journalist and broadcaster
- 12 January – Paul Norris, 45, radio presenter
- 16 January – Steve Evans, 52, amateur magician and radio personality
- 17 February – Frank Wappat, 84, broadcaster (BBC Radio Newcastle)
- 7 March – Hal Douglas, 90, voice-over
- 19 April – Derek Cooper, 88, food writer and broadcaster
- 6 May – Antony Hopkins, 93, composer, pianist, conductor and music broadcaster
- 1 August – Mike Smith, 59, television presenter, previously BBC Radio 1 DJ
- 18 August – James Alexander Gordon, 78, Sports Report football results announcer.
- 21 August – Gerry Anderson, 69, Northern Irish radio broadcaster
- 30 September – Sheila Tracy, 80, broadcast presenter, previously swing trombonist
- 9 October – David Rayvern Allen, 76, radio producer and cricket writer
- 14 November – Betty Smith, 93, BBC Radio Humberside presenter
- Unknown – Rod Webster, 69, radio executive and founder of Radio Borders
