= Daryl Denham =

British disc jockey, radio presenter and songwriter

Daryl Denham is a British disc jockey, radio presenter and songwriter.

== Early career ==
Denham's career started at school, where he was active in producing pop music productions in school concerts, organizing pop quizzes and writing and performing parody songs. He worked privately as a DJ in his own time. After leaving school, he began his first live show at the "Radio Forest" community hospital radio station, based in Epping, Essex. He later became chairman of the organisation and is still a member there today.

His early broadcasting career was at BBC Radio Kent, Invicta FM (where he once fell asleep during an overnight show), SGR-FM in Essex and Chiltern FM in Dunstable.

In 1992, Denham also began working as a stand-up comedian in London, but gave it up to concentrate on breakfast radio.

== Hallam FM ==
Denham moved to Hallam FM in South Yorkshire in 1996. He presented both the breakfast show and a late night spin-off, Daryl Denham's Unshaven Haven (a.k.a. The X Rated Daryl Denham Show), which was a more risque version of a breakfast show format, featuring parody songs and skits.

== 100.7 Heart FM ==
In 2000, Denham moved to 100.7 Heart FM in Birmingham, presenting their Breakfast Show and winning the Sony Radio Academy Awards Breakfast Music Award. He was summed up by the judges as "a welcome blast of fresh air....Daryl is a broadcaster who does not underestimate or patronise his audience and avoids relying on base, easy humour. He also showed a refreshing depth of understanding of the music played. An extremely rich and creative programme very worthy of a Gold Award."

Whilst at Heart FM, he performed several spoof sketches, off-the-cuff jokes and wacky competitions. He remained there until December 2001.

== Virgin Radio ==
On 2 January 2002, Denham broadcast his first national show, as Virgin Radio (later rebranded Absolute Radio) hired him to present their 5 pm – 7 pm Drivetime show from Monday to Thursday and a Saturday morning show from 10 am to 2 pm.

From 28 January 2002, Denham presented the 6 am – 10 am Breakfast Show, after the sudden departure of Steve Penk, who was expected to take over the Drivetime show. As Denham took over Breakfast, evening show presenters Pete Mitchell and Geoff Lloyd (a.k.a. Pete & Geoff) took the Drivetime show. In addition to the Breakfast show, Denham still continued with his Saturday morning show.

On 6 January 2003, Denham took over the weekday drivetime show from 5 pm to 8 pm, with Pete & Geoff taking over breakfast. In July 2003, his drivetime show went out from 4 pm to 7 pm.

In January 2004, Denham took over the Weekend Breakfast show for the station from 6 am to 10 am, where he remained until he left the station in June the same year.

== Century 100-102 ==
Denham moved to 100-102 Century FM in the North-East of England in August 2004, presenting the weekday breakfast show from 5:30 am to 9 am. However, in April 2005 he resigned on-air, stating that he had personal problems and was leaving the station.

== Back to Hallam ==
On 18 June 2005, Denham returned to Hallam FM in South Yorkshire, taking over a Saturday morning show from 10 am to 2 pm. In January 2006, he took over the weekday mid-morning show for the station from 9 am to 1 pm, where he remained until early 2007.

== Real Radio Yorkshire ==
Denham joined Real Radio Yorkshire on 5 March 2007, taking over the weekday evening show from 7 pm to 10 pm. He presented their Breakfast show with Gayle Lofthouse before taking over the Real Drive Home from 4 pm to 8 – pm with Dixie replacing him on the Real breakfast show. A further move in the schedules saw Denham move to mid-mornings (9 am 1 pm) in 2011, with Pete Egerton moving to drive.

On 2 November 2012, he presented his final mid-morning show for Real Radio.

== Smooth Radio ==
Daryl was heard on Smooth Radio through the night in December 2012. He was also the main cover for Simon Bates on the Smooth Radio Breakfast during the Christmas 2012 period. Following a major overhaul of the station's schedule in January 2013, Denham became Smooth's weekend breakfast presenter, succeeding Pat Sharp.

In January 2014, it was announced Denham had left Smooth Radio with immediate effect.

== BBC Radio Kent ==
In 2015, Denham joined BBC Radio Kent. The station had overhauled its format, with a punchier style and marketed as "radio you can't help but interact with". Denham now regularly presents a late-night phone-in and comedy show, Call Daryl, on Friday nights from 10 pm to 1 am, as well as covering for other presenters.

He also presents Drive Time 3pm till 6pm (GMT) on Ocean Radio in Spain, and the Retro Chart Show every Sunday 3pm till 6pm.

== Songwriting ==
Denham has hit the charts twice. Whilst at Virgin, he re-wrote the lyrics of the Jam's "Going Underground", taking "Go England" to number 26 as the England Boys. Then in 2005, he scored a number 11 hit as Pondlife with "Ring Ding Ding", the original Crazy Frog song.

He has also written songs for Kid Creole and Black Lace.

== Stand Up – The Musical ==
In September 2013, Denham produced a new musical he had written called Stand Up. It told the stories of three comedians at different stages in their lives and starred Darren Day, Lionel Blair, Billy Pearce and Dean Sullivan. The production ran at the Floral Pavilion in New Brighton to positive reviews and showcased twenty new songs Denham had written with co-producer Maurice Cheetham.

== Appearances and other work ==
- Denham is a co-founder of Podshows.com, a podcasting company.
- Denham appeared on former ITV1 gameshow Keynotes, lasting 3 days and winning a grand total of £60.
- He made a cameo appearance as the 'brave' truck driver in the 2009 film, Freight.

Media offices
Preceded by Pat Sharp	Smooth Radio weekend breakfast show presenter January 2013 – January 2014	Succeeded by Emma B and Eamonn Kelly
