= Annabel Port =

British radio personality

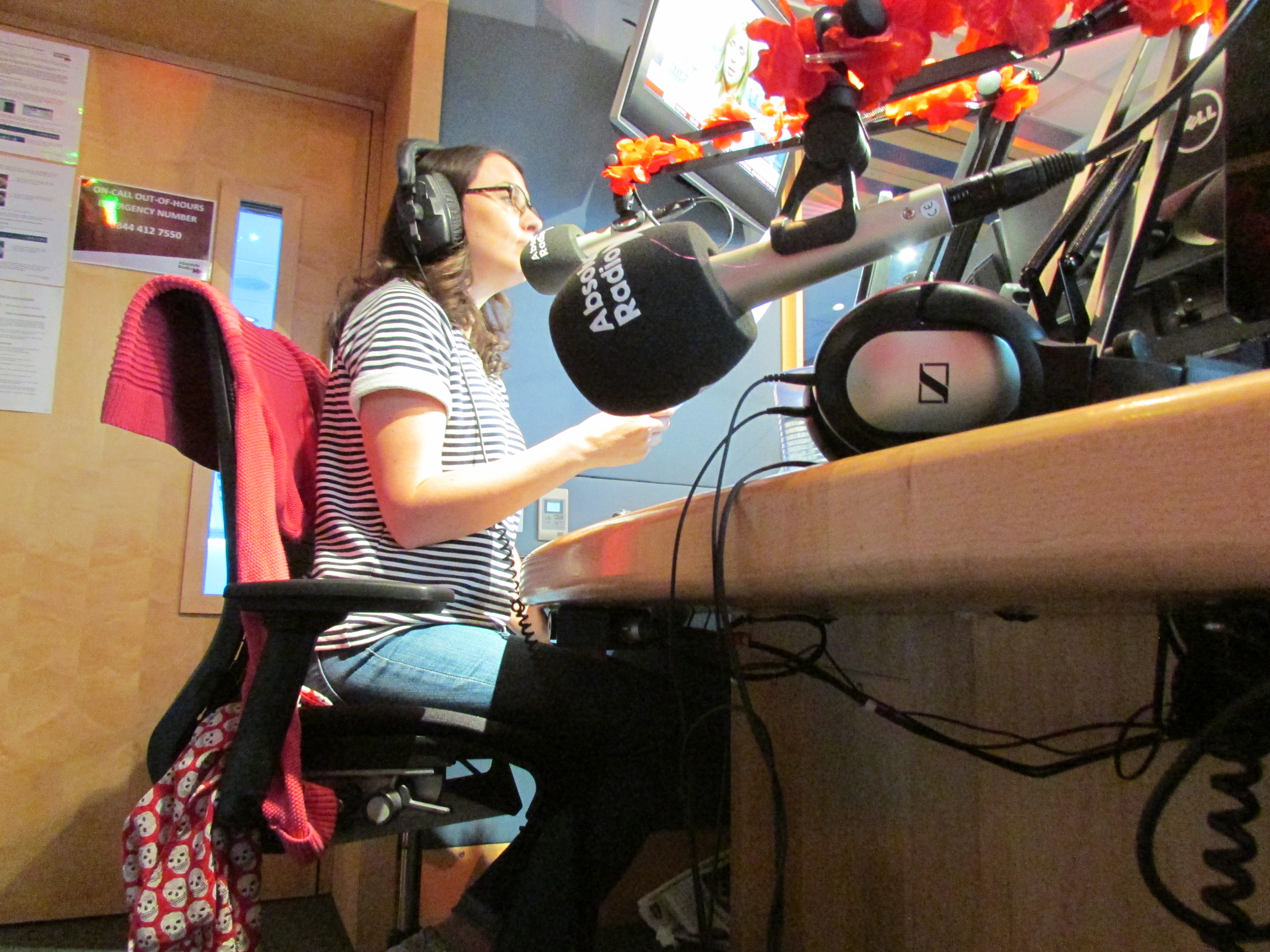
- Annabel Port
- Occupation: Radio Presenter
- Known for: Geoff Lloyd's Hometime Show
- Website: Absolute Radio Biography

Annabel Port is a British radio presenter. She was the co-presenter of Geoff Lloyd with Annabel Port on Absolute Radio from 2008 until the show ended on 12 April 2017. Previously, she has worked on The Geoff Show and read travel reports on the Pete and Geoff Breakfast Show which she hosted along with Lloyd and Pete Mitchell before the latter's departure in December 2005. On 9 May 2011 she won a Gold Sony Radio Award for Best On-Air Contributor.

== Early life and career ==
Prior to working in radio, she taught ESL to Poles and Mexicans for three years, spent six months doing data input, one week cleaning an old people's home and to her knowledge holds the national record for the 6 years she held a paper round (until the unusually mature age of 18). Port is a former presenter of Whipps Cross Hospital Radio.

== Broadcasting career ==
=== Virgin Radio ===
On 14 January 2001 she came to Virgin Radio on a work experience placement and was spotted by Lloyd. Since then she has auditioned to be Michael Hutchence's replacement in INXS and has been to circus school. In a show broadcast on 9 September 2005, Sir Paul McCartney assisted her in completing a song about beef tomatoes.

Port worked on the late night show The Geoff Show from its inception in January 2006 until it ended in September 2008, and devised and presented a number of radio features, including "Porting Controversy", as well as a velvety broadcast voice on the infamous "Dirty Book At Bedtime".

Before 'The Geoff Show', Port also presented features on the Virgin Radio Breakfast Show, which included "Annabel's Animals" where Geoff was asked to guess the identity of animals brought to the studio by local zoos. A more regular feature was "Annabel's Friday Song". This is where the aforementioned tomato song with Sir Paul McCartney was aired. This feature is now occasionally resurrected on 'The Geoff Show' when the show does a podcast only show, albeit a "bawdy" song not fit for broadcast on UK radio.

"Annabel's Friday Song" was usually a short, comical song introducing the coming weekend, with varying topical verses played live by Annabel. The song was introduced as coming "From the golden throat of miss Annabel Port".

Chorus
Oh what does it mean when the pubs are all packed at five-thirty?
Oh what does it mean when we're all having fish for our tea?
Oh what does it mean when Top of the Pops is on the telly?
Oh yes, the weekend's nearly here;
So sing along with meeee-ee hee hee...

=== Absolute Radio ===
On 29 September 2008, Port moved along with the rest of the team to Geoff Lloyd's Hometime Show.

On 9 May 2011 she won a Gold Sony Radio Award for Best On-Air Contributor, beating, among others, Moira Stuart and Mark Kermode.

Annabel Port is the author of the music and lyrics of the Dead Dog Memorial Song. The song arose out of a show feature dedicated to listeners' dead dogs; Annabel was set the task of writing a memorial to those dogs. On 15 July 2013 Annabel revealed to the world the Dead Dog Memorial Song on Geoff Lloyd's Hometime Show. The song was then recorded by the band The Boy Least Likely To and released on The Hometime Show on 18 July 2013. Profits from the Dead Dog Memorial Song go the Dogs Trust charity.

== Other work ==
In August 2017, Annabel began co-hosting a podcast with her former Absolute Radio co-host Geoff Lloyd called Adrift. In April 2018, her first book, Annabel vs. The Internet, was published. The book is based on a feature of the same name from the old Hometime radio show in which Geoff would set weekly challenges for her.

Since September 2020, Annabel has been the editor of www.getgetgot.com and in April 2023 launched her online newsletter, Bit Weird, Quite Normal.
