= Geoff Lloyd with Annabel Port =

Former UK radio programme

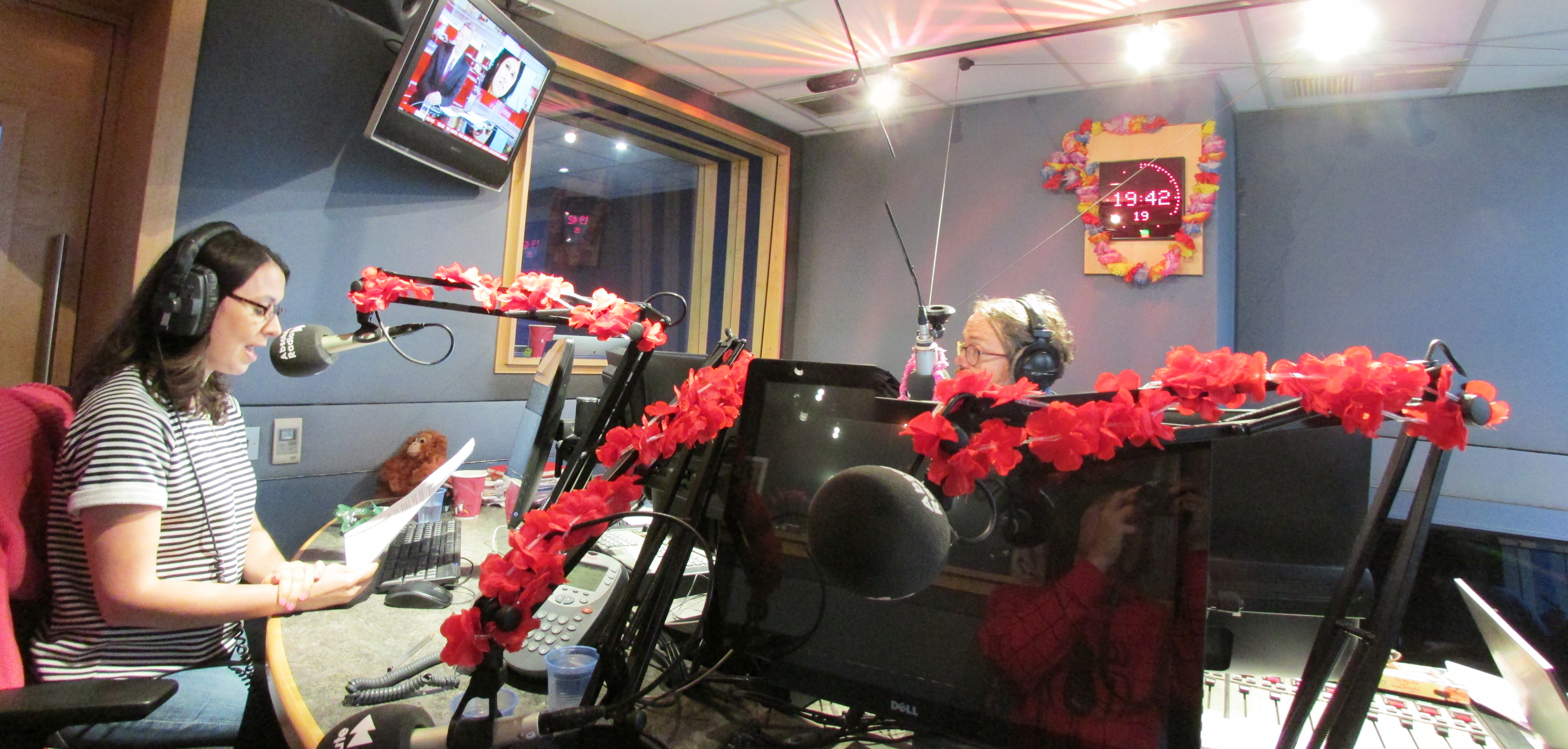
- Running time: 3 hours
- Country of origin: United Kingdom
- Language: English
- Home station: Absolute Radio
- Hosted by: Geoff Lloyd
- Starring: Geoff Lloyd; Annabel Port; Gareth Evans; Greg Burke
- Original release: 29 September 2008 (old format), 1 August 2015 (new format) – 12 April 2017
- Website: Absolute Radio Website Link
- Podcast: Absolute Radio Podcast Link

Geoff Lloyd with Annabel Port was a drivetime radio programme, broadcast on Absolute Radio.

The show ran for three hours, between 6pm and 9pm, Monday to Thursday, and two hours, between 6pm and 8pm, on Fridays. Presented by Geoff Lloyd, it also featured his 'symposium', comprising himself, Annabel Port, Gareth Evans and newsreader Tania Snuggs. A daily podcast of the previous afternoon's show was also produced. During the introductions of each of the podcasts, Geoff read out dedications sent in by listeners, known as a Podication.

On 18 January 2017, Geoff announced on air that the show will be coming to an end in Spring 2017. The final show was broadcast on 12 April 2017.

== Presenters ==
Geoff Lloyd began presenting on Virgin Radio in 1998 alongside Pete Mitchell, moving to the breakfast show in 2003. In 2005, he and Pete left the breakfast slot and Geoff began his own late-night show, The Geoff Show in early 2006. In September 2008, the show was moved to an early evening slot when Virgin Radio became Absolute Radio.

Annabel Port began working at Virgin Radio in 2001, reading the travel news on the Pete and Geoff breakfast show. She worked on the Geoff Show from 2006 on Virgin Radio, and has co-presented the show since it began in September 2008.

Greg Burke is a newsreader for Absolute Radio, and reads the news and sport for the show.

Gareth Evans (nicknamed 'Gruff' or 'Gaz' by Geoff Lloyd), is the producer of the show, and makes occasional on air contributions.

Nelson Kumah is a former producer of the show who mysteriously disappeared without any send off by the team or explanation.

Dan Benedictus is the assistant producer of the show. He also hosts a show on one of Absolute Radio's sister station, Absolute Radio 90s, on Sunday evenings.

== Features ==
- Introduction - Geoff says: "It's x minutes past five, it's Absolute Radio, I'm Geoff Lloyd and it's hometime". After jingles etc. Geoff introduces the team (typically Annabel Port, 'Gruff', person reading tweets and "your newsreader" Tania Snuggs) who all give a cheerful "hello" over the jolly tune of We're from Barcelona by I'm from Barcelona.
- Geoffanory: A play on the BBC programme Jackanory, in which Geoff presents a phone in topic and then gives an example story from his own (often rather odd) life, asking the callers to better it. Calls are then put on the air, with texts and e-mail read out by Annabel.
- Talk to the Animals: An occasional feature where callers who are close to an animal are invited to call in. If they can get the animal to make a noise within 10 seconds, they win a prize (normally gig tickets).
- Annabel's All Star Postbag: A feature where Annabel Port reads letters supposedly sent into the show by famous people. The background music for the section is an old Geoff Show favourite, Typewriter Tip Tip from the Typewriter Scene of the 1970 film Bombay Talkie.
- Record of the Week: Each week, Geoff chooses a song and plays it each day, as his record of the week.
- Podication (Podcast only material): Carried over from the Geoff Show days, this feature appears at the end of the podcast editions of each show. Listeners can email in and ask for a specific day's podcast to be dedicated to them or someone they know, with Geoff reading their email out.
- Members Only Hour: From 7pm Monday to Thursday, the show is only open to members. Geoff advises non-members to tune to another station, playing obscure songs and audio clips and pretending they are other stations. Listeners are asked to submit their 'apologies' for missing Members Only Hour via Twitter and Facebook. A selection of these are read out by Annabel. There then is usually either phone-in topic revealed, deemed too high-brow for the usual listeners. Occasionally, bands play live sessions during this segment.
- Feed the Trolls: Every day Annabel is tasked with finding a popular news article (often from left or right-wing news sites) and creating a comment that will cause a response (nb. Trolling). Comments are usually the opposite to the general view of comments already on the site, and the comment is written earlier in the day to get maximum response. Funny responses and the how it was received are read at the end of the show on Monday - Thursday (often being rushed to fit in) and just before 7pm on a Friday.

The show also regularly featured music sessions from bands and singers, many of which are available to watch on the show's website.

- I Want to Be Adored: A caller was asked a series of questions by Geoff and the symposium then told the caller what they thought of him/her. Listeners were encouraged to text in either 'pass' or 'fail', depending on whether or not they liked the person, with Annabel then reading the percentages out and determining whether the person is or is not liked and loved by general society. A prize was given whether the caller is loved or not, for going through such an ordeal. The theme tune was "I Want to Be Loved by You" by Marilyn Monroe. This feature was dropped in January 2009.
- A Pause for Port: Annabel tells a story about a song she listened to earlier that day. The story begins nicely, but Annabel then starts to analyse the lyrics and draw negatives from them, with the story normally ending with how she would engage in some sort of self-harm rather than listen to the song again. Geoff then plays the aforementioned song. This feature was discontinued in July 2009.
- The Big I Am...: Carried over from Geoff's old evening show, a feature where listeners have to text in a description of what they are doing, starting with the words "I am" in the style of the original social networks, with all Facebook status updates once having to begin with "I am". Annabel read out a selection to "I Am What I Am" by Gloria Gaynor. This was originally a daily feature.
- Any Other Business: This feature was broadcast Mon-Thurs, just after 7 o'clock and showcased late listener contributions to phone-in topics from previous shows. It was retired upon the introduction of the Members' Only Hour
- Annabel's challenge: Each week, Geoff gives Annabel a task.

== Geoff Lloyd's Hometime Show ==
Between its launch in 2008 and August 2015, the show ran from 5pm to 8pm on Monday to Thursday, and 5pm to 7pm on Fridays, under the name "Geoff Lloyd's Hometime Show", with many of the same features as the show after that time. It was moved because the no-repeat guarantee was extended for an extra hour until 6pm, with a new show hosted by Danielle Perry between 4pm and 6pm
