= The Geoff Show =

UK radio program

- Running time: 3 hours
- Country of origin: United Kingdom
- Language: English
- Home station: Absolute Radio
- Hosted by: Geoff Lloyd
- Starring: Geoff Lloyd; Annabel Port; Nelson Kumah
- Produced by: Nelson Kumah
- Recording studio: Studio H. No. 1, Golden Square, London
- Original release: 3 January 2006 – 25 September 2008
- Audio format: Stereophonic sound
- Website: Absolute Radio website
- Podcast: Absolute Radio podcast

The Geoff Show was a humorous radio programme broadcast on Absolute Radio (formerly Virgin Radio) from 3 January 2006 to 25 September 2008.

The show ran for three hours, between 10 pm and 1 am, Monday to Thursday. Presented by Geoff Lloyd, it also featured his 'symposium', comprising himself, Annabel Port and his producer Nelson Kumah. A daily podcast of the previous night's show was also produced.

During the introductions of each of these podcasts, Geoff read out dedications sent in by listeners. Those who sent letters through the post were rewarded with a Geoff Show badge, which was handmade by Annabel Port. On the podcast of the 11 December 2007 show, it was announced that Tony would be leaving his position as producer to take a promotion elsewhere within Absolute Radio. His replacement, Nelson Kumah, began on 7 January 2008.

As part of the rebrand to Absolute Radio, Geoff moved to Geoff Lloyd's Hometime Show in the afternoon slot. On 16 September 2008, he announced that the Geoff Show was going to end on 25 September 2008.

== Features ==
- Podications: The podcast was dedicated to listeners who contacted the show in a 'podication'.
- Phone In topics: Topics were suggested by Geoff, Annabel and Nelson, normally illustrated by an example. Listeners contacted the station.
- Porting Controversy: A self-opinionated debate against widely held beliefs by Annabel.
- Drunk Versus Stoned: A quiz in which someone who had been drinking alcohol competes with another listener who had been smoking cannabis in order to win a prize.
- The Big 'I Am...': Listeners had to complete the sentence 'I am...', and Annabel Port read out the texts every night.
- Annabel's Letter: Annabel writes an open letter to a person and gives them advice in a career or relationship.
- Nelson's Special Offers: The closeout feature of the show was where listeners would either text or email in with either a name of a city or town in the British Isles or a type of business, and Nelson had to procure a discount for Geoff Show listeners at that place in that city or town.

== The final show ==
Its final show was on 25 September 2008.

Drunk Versus Stoned on the final show was played by Drunk Gail in Staffordshire (1 point) and Stoned Tony in London (3½ points). Geoff (Nimla) = 2½ points; Richard = no points. The Stoners won by one.
