= Go England =

Single by The England Boys
- Released: 2002
- Studio: Virgin Radio
- Genre: Football song
- Label: Mercury Records
- Composer: Paul Weller
- Lyricist: Daryl Denham

"Go England" is an English 2002 single performed by the England Boys. It was written by the Virgin Radio DJ Daryl Denham and published by Mercury Records as an adaptation of the Jam's 1980 hit song "Going Underground" to support the England national football team at the 2002 FIFA World Cup. The song entered the British charts and reached a peak of No. 26 on the singles chart.

== History ==
"Going Underground" was written in 1980. The frontman of the Jam, Paul Weller had hoped that he could adapt his music to fit a football song to support the England national football team at the 2002 FIFA World Cup. Weller gave permission to Daryl Denham to write new lyrics to adapt "Going Underground" into a football song in April 2002. "Go England" was created as a result and was performed by the England Boys, a group which comprised a number of Virgin Radio staff and presenters which was fronted by Denham. The song was intended to be used as the official fan's anthem for England at the tournament. However that commission from The Football Association went to "We're on the Ball" by Ant & Dec.

== Release ==
"Go England" was released as a single in June 2002 with the CD release containing the original song as well as a commentary and karaoke mix. The song first entered the UK Singles Chart on 8 June 2002 at number 26; however it charted below competing football songs; "Hey! Baby" by DJ Ötzi and "Goldenballs (Mr Beckham to You)" by Bell & Spurling. The following two weeks it fell to numbers 46 and 52 before exiting the charts after three weeks.
