= Sara Barron =

American comedian & writer

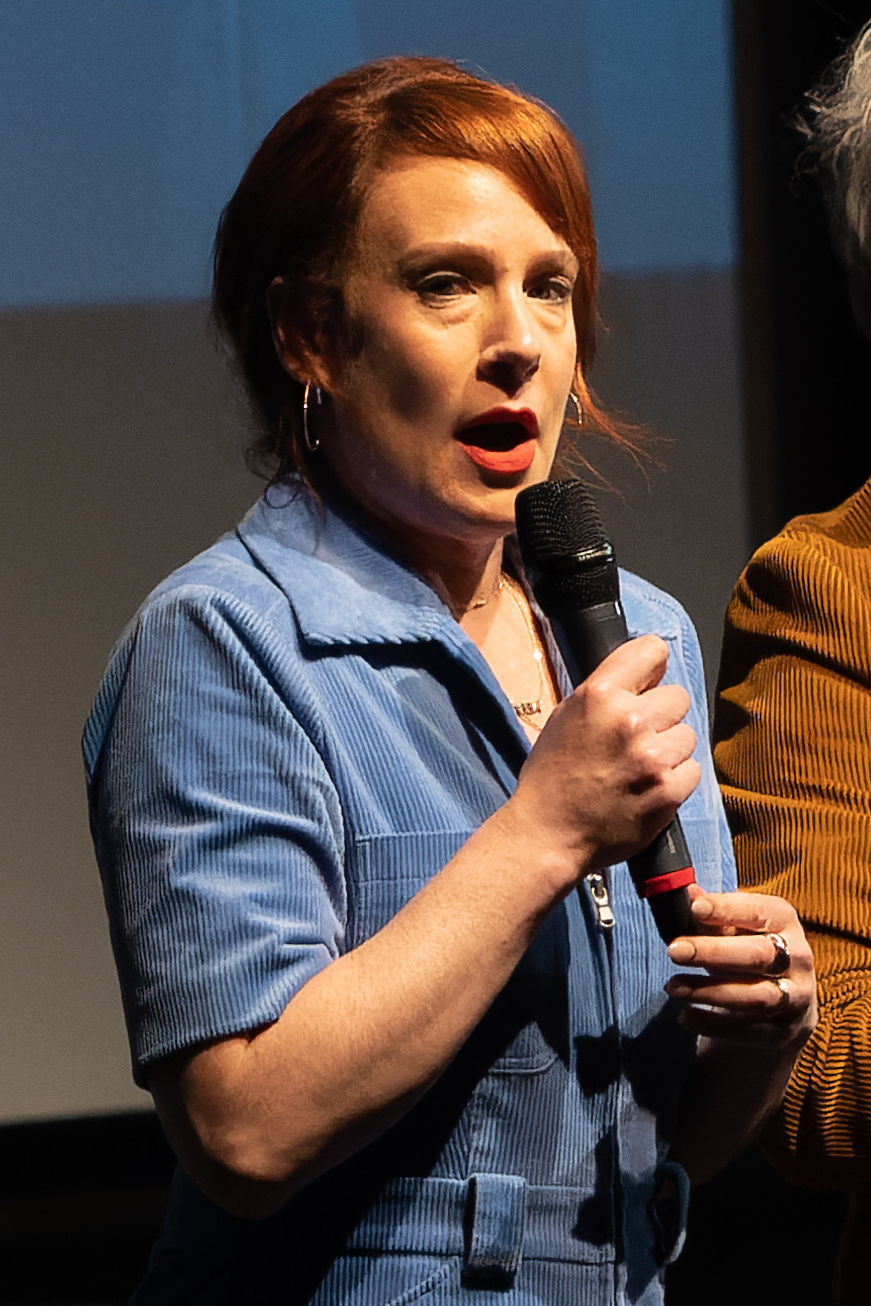
- Barron in 2023
- Born: Chicago
- Occupations: Comedian; writer
- Years active: 2009–present
- Spouse: Geoff Lloyd

Sara Barron (born 1978 or 1979) is an American comedian and writer based in the United Kingdom.

== Early life ==
Barron was born in Chicago.

== Career ==
Before moving to London, Barron lived in New York. In 2009, her memoir People Are Unappealing received some media attention for a chapter detailing her encounters with obnoxious celebrities while working as a waitress. She was one of the hosts of the storytelling show The Moth.

In 2018, Barron's debut show at the Edinburgh Festival Fringe, For Worse, was nominated for the Edinburgh Comedy Awards Best Newcomer Award. She returned to the Fringe in 2019 with Enemies Closer, and in 2022 with Hard Feelings.

Her television appearances have included Would I Lie to You?, Richard Osman's House of Games, Frankie Boyle's New World Order and Roast Battle. She appeared on Celebrity Mastermind in 2023.

Barron co-hosted Firecrotch & Normcore, a podcast about the TV series Succession, with her husband Geoff Lloyd. When Succession ended in 2023, they launched They Like To Watch, a more general podcast about television, at the suggestion of Succession producer Jesse Armstrong.

In 2023, Barron starred in The Burger Files, a spoof true crime podcast written by Joel Morris for the fast food restaurant chain Wendy's.

== Bibliography ==
- Barron, Sara (2009). People Are Unappealing: Even Me. Three Rivers Press. ISBN 9780307382450.
- Barron, Sara (2014). The Harm in Asking: My Clumsy Encounters with the Human Race. Three Rivers Press. ISBN 9780307720702.
