= Sissela Benn =

Swedish actress and comedian

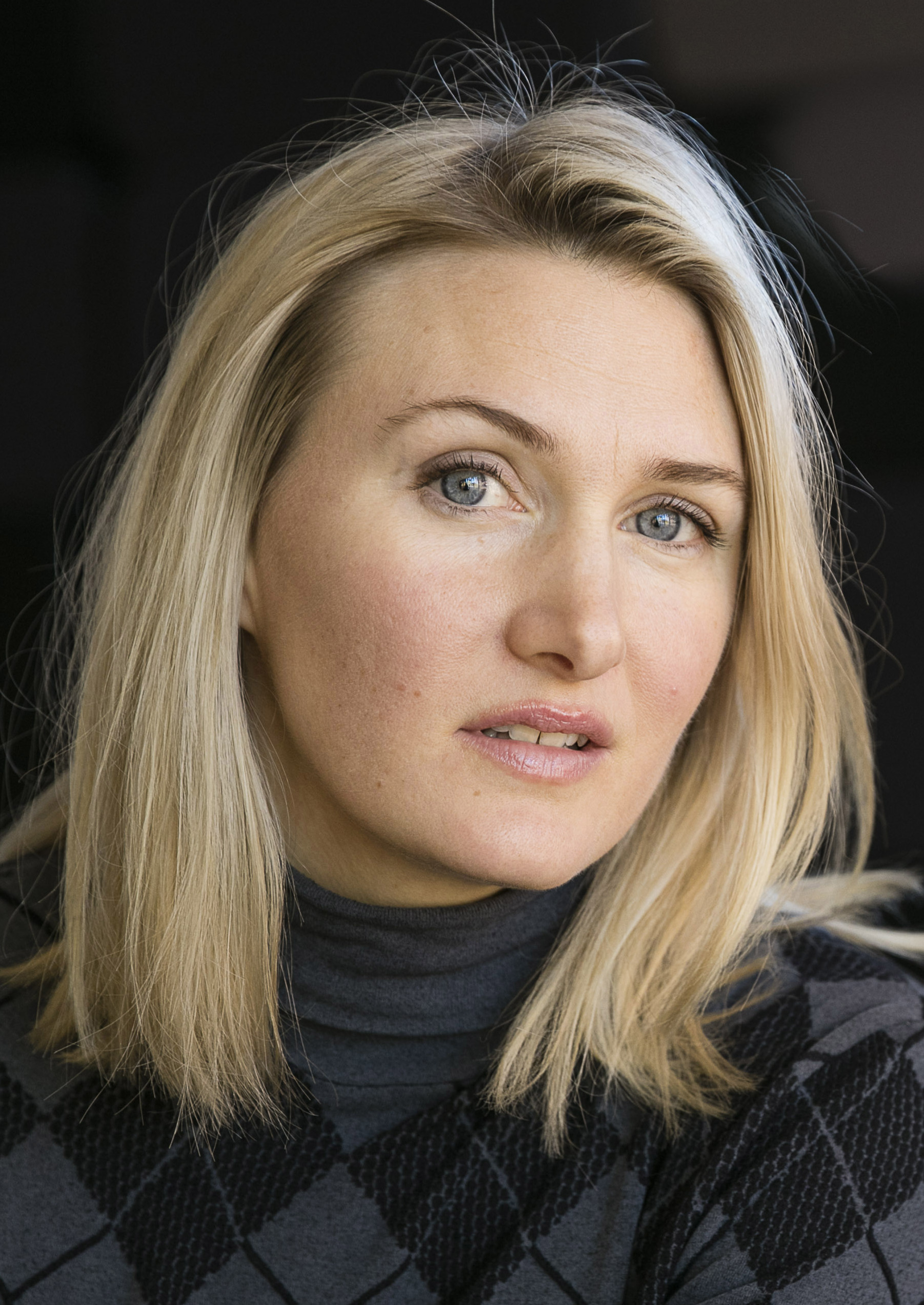

Sissela Benn (born 14 May 1980, in Malmö) is a Swedish actress and comedian. Benn has appeared in Robins, Melodifestivalen and Centralskolan.

Along with Simon Svensson, Emma Hansson and Jesper Rönndahl, Benn created the comedy group "Einsteins kvinnor" (Einstein's women). In 2008, Benn played Marilyn Monroe in the Malmö theater play about the actress called Marilynpassionen. In June 2013, Benn revealed she had landed the leading role in the Malmö theaters new play Sitcom – en tv-fri kväll to be started in August.

Benn has appeared in several television series such as the comedy series Lilla landet lagom and Sverige pussas och kramas both on Kanal 5, and also Morgonsoffan on SVT. On 6 August 2008 Benn hosted the radioshow Sommar i P1 where Swedish celebrities tell about their lives. From 2012 to 2013 Benn had a role in the TV4 show Kontoret, a Swedish adaptation of the British series The Office. From 2014 to 2020, Benn played Linda in the BBC Radio 4 sitcom The Cold Swedish Winter.
