= John Osborne (broadcaster) =

British radio broadcaster

- Born: London
- Presenting career
- Style: Radio Presenter
- Country: United Kingdom

John Osborne is a British radio broadcaster. He started his radio career on London's pirate radio circuit, culminating in South London's very successful Horizon Radio.

== Career ==
In 1981 he became the resident DJ at the famous nightclub, Room at the Top, also at this time he worked for Soul on Sound and Soundwave magazines where he did reviews and interviews including Madonna, Kajagoogoo, Nick Heywood and In the mid-1980s on his pirate broadcasts on London station Horizon radio he interviewed artists such as Mary Wilson of The Supremes. Osborne continued to DJ in clubs such as Hippodrome, Camden Palace, Limelight, Buzz Bar, London. Stage 3, Cinderellas Rockerfellas, 5th Avenue and The Ritzy. In 1992, Osborne won the BEDA Club DJ of the year award and was nominated for The Disco International award.

Osborne became the presenter of the DMC Mixing Championships from 1992 to 1994. In the '80s and '90s he wrote articles for the music press.

In 1996 Osborne started working in legal local radio. He joined Invicta FM, the independent local radio station for Kent owned by Capital Radio. His interviews included The Spice Girls, Boyzone, Craig David, Jim Kerr and Robin Gibb. He presented various radio shows including The Wind Down Zone, Just 80's, Boogie Years, The Online Request Show and the afternoon weekday slot and the Friday and Saturday night Club Dance Show. He appeared at most nightclubs in Kent during this time.

== Virgin/Absolute Radio ==
In 2002 Osborne joined Virgin Radio. He presented many different shows but mainly Virgin Party Classics and Early Breakfast, also covering daytime shows including breakfast and drive-time. He continued to guest DJ at clubs such as Strawberry Moons, Club Boulevard and The Electric Ballroom where he broadcast the New Year's Eve show on Virgin Radio. He continued writing for newspapers and magazines.

When Virgin became Absolute Radio began presenting Weekend Breakfast and mid-week overnights, also filling in for absent DJs.

== Gold ==
Osborne worked on Gold for two years, on the late night weekend slot from 10pm, including covering other shows. He appeared at Gold's Music Weekenders.

== Jazz FM ==
Osborne joined Jazz fm in 2012 to present weekend breakfast. He became host of the weekday Jazz Breakfast in late 2013, before being moved to weekend breakfast a year later. He has hosted Funky Sensation and Saturday Soul for the station on Saturday evenings.

== Solar Radio ==
In addition to Jazz FM, Osborne is a presenter on digital soul music station Solar Radio on Tuesday afternoons.

== Other work ==
Osborne appears at nightclubs and music festivals and is one of the main DJs at the Caister Soul Weekenders. He runs a DJ agency.
