= Geoff Lloyd =

English radio & TV host

Geoff Barron Lloyd
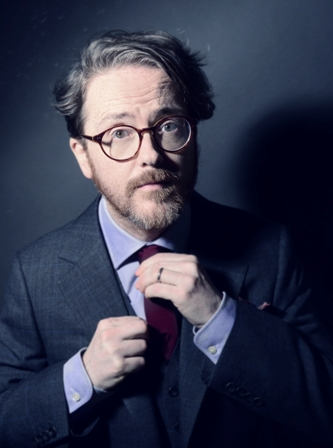
- Born: 20 April 1973 (age 53); Withington, Manchester, Lancashire, England
- Known for: Pete And Geoff Breakfast Show; The Geoff Show; Geoff Lloyd with Annabel Port

Geoff Barron Lloyd (born 20 April 1973) is an English radio presenter, television host, podcast host and writer, best known for his talk radio and music shows. He is married to comedian Sara Barron and hosts the Firecrotch & Normcore podcast with her.

== Early life ==
Lloyd was born in Withington, Manchester, England, and raised in Macclesfield, Cheshire, England. As a teen, he worked as a paperboy, a suit salesman, and in 1989 he began working at a local print works after school, earning £1 an hour.

== Radio career ==
=== Beginnings in radio (1991–96) ===
Lloyd began his radio career in 1991 as a traffic and travel reporter at Signal Cheshire in Stockport, remaining there until the end of 1994.

Lloyd has called comedian Craig Cash a major influence on his career, for both his comedy and interview style as well as his support. Cash hired Lloyd to work on The Mrs Merton Show as a runner, and later introduced Lloyd to Pete Mitchell, who he would end up teaming up with on the air for a decade as the duo Pete and Geoff.

=== Pete and Geoff (1996–2005) ===
Lloyd first teamed up with Pete Mitchell in 1996 at Piccadilly Radio in Manchester. Soon after, they took over the afternoon show on local radio station Key 103. In late 1998, the duo, known as Pete and Geoff, was recruited by Virgin Radio to take over the weekday evening show. They also covered for Chris Evans on the breakfast show on occasion, and rapidly built up a large audience. The pair took over the drive time breakfast show in 2002. Lloyd provided a comedic, occasionally outrageous personality, with Mitchell as the straight man. They were known for their "political satire… mixed with pub humour." They won a Sony Gold Radio Academy Award for an interview with Noel Gallagher in 1998, and won a second Sony Gold for an interview with Paul McCartney in 2002. In March 2005, Virgin Radio launched a daily half-hour podcast consisting of the best bits from the Pete and Geoff Breakfast Show. It was the station's first foray into podcasting, and the first daily show to be made available in podcast format from one of the major radio groups.

In May 2005, the duo announced that they were splitting up, and left the breakfast show at the end of the year. Their final show together took place on 16 December 2005. Virgin Radio programming director Paul Jackson called them "great radio talents." The duo were replaced as hosts of the breakfast show by Christian O'Connell. Lloyd remained at Virgin Radio, taking over the late night slot.

=== Geoff Lloyd with Annabel Port and other shows (2006–2017) ===
Lloyd's new show, The Geoff Show, debuted on 3 January 2006 and was broadcast late nights on Virgin Radio, with co-host Annabel Port and producer Nelson Kumah. The first public airing of The Beatles remix album Love was on The Geoff Show in 2006.

Virgin Radio was rebranded as Absolute Radio in 2008. On 20 March 2008 Lloyd began presenting the Absolute Radio weekday drive time program Geoff Lloyd's Hometime Show, with Port remaining as co-host. The show combines music and chat, with call-ins on various topics. At its core is "the digressive, quirky chat on matters of very little real importance." On 1 August 2015 the show was moved back an hour and renamed Geoff Lloyd with Annabel Port.

From 2010 to 2014, Lloyd hosted Unknown Pleasures on Absolute Radio, playing indie rock and alternative music. In 2013, Lloyd began hosting Beatles Brunch with Geoff Lloyd on Sunday mornings on Absolute Radio 60s, two hours of Beatles music and cover versions of their songs, along with talk exclusively about the band. In 2016, Lloyd and Port created the podcast Serial: This British Life, a parody of the WBEZ podcast Serial.

Lloyd has interviewed a wide variety of subjects, including Paul McCartney, talk show host Conan O'Brien, comedian Russell Brand and then-UK Labour Party leader Ed Miliband, in an interview described as one of Miliband's best broadcast interview performances.

On 18 January 2017, Geoff Lloyd announced he and Annabel were leaving Absolute Radio. The final show aired on Wednesday 12 April.

=== After Absolute (2017–present) ===
In May 2017, It was announced Lloyd would be fronting a show for The Beatles Channel on Sirius XM Radio.

In August 2017, Lloyd launched a podcast, 'Adrift with Geoff Lloyd and Annabel Port', with his former radio co-host, and the following month launched 'Reasons to be Cheerful', a podcast with Ed Miliband.

Lloyd made a return to commercial radio in early 2018 with Geoff Lloyd's Hometown Glory, an interview series for Union JACK, featuring guests from comedy, music and entertainment. The show returned for a second run in the summer.

Since leaving Absolute, Lloyd has established himself as a regular cover presenter for BBC Radio, standing in for Danny Baker and Adrian Chiles, covering the breakfast show on BBC Radio 5 Live, and covering various late-night programmes on BBC Radio 2 and BBC Radio 6 Music.

Lloyd returned to Virgin Radio in January 2026.

== Writing and television ==
Lloyd has written for Channel 4's TFI Friday, BBC One's Comic Relief, Chris Addison's Cakes and Ale show at the Edinburgh Festival Fringe, and Dave Gorman: Modern Life is Goodish. He was a columnist for The New Day, and has written for the New Statesman and Huffington Post.

In 2009 and 2010, Lloyd worked alongside Annabel Port on a Channel 5 fan show for the drama series FlashForward. Titled FlashForward Friday, the online show was a weekly review on the latest episode of the series following its broadcast on Channel 5.

From 2011 to 2013, Lloyd and Port hosted seasons 1–3 of Thronecast, a Sky Atlantic television series reviewing the latest episodes of HBO's Game of Thrones.

In 2018, Lloyd created and co-produced a comedy talk-show format, 'Am I Normal?', hosted by Sara Pascoe and Aisling Bea, and broadcast on BBC Radio 2.

Lloyd has appeared several times on the Channel 4 show Richard & Judy; as a commentator on Big Brother's Little Brother with Dermot O'Leary; and as a celebrity contestant on the gameshows Eggheads and Win, Lose or Draw Late.

== Awards ==
- Silver Sony Radio Academy Award for The Pete & Geoff Afternoon Show on Key 103, 1998
- Gold Sony Radio Academy Award for The Best Daily Music Programme for The Pete & Geoff Show on Virgin Radio, 2002
- European Radio Award for Best Radio Personality, 2007
- Bronze Sony Radio Academy Award for Music Personality of the Year, 2008
- Arqiva Commercial Radio Presenter of the Year (large – broadcasting to more than 1 million), 2010
- Gold Sony Radio Academy Award for Best Single Promo/Commercial for Geoff Lloyd's Hometime Show – "The Complaints", 2012
- Nominee, Sony Radio Academy Award for Best Entertainment Programme for Geoff Lloyd's Hometime Show, 2013
- Nominee, Broadcasting Press Guild Radio Broadcaster of the Year, 2015
- Winner, Broadcasting Press Guild Awards 2018 Podcast of the Year
- Nominee, British Podcast Awards – Best New Podcast for 'Reasons to be Cheerful with Ed Miliband and Geoff Lloyd'
- Nominee, British Podcast Awards – Best Current Affairs Podcast for 'Reasons to be Cheerful with Ed Miliband and Geoff Lloyd'
- Bronze Award, British Podcast Awards – Best New Podcast for 'Adrift with Geoff Lloyd and Annabel Port'

== See also ==
- Pete and Geoff
- The Geoff Show
- Geoff Lloyd with Annabel Port
