= Nentwich =

Nentwich is a surname. Notable people with the surname include:

- Ralf Nentwich (born 1982), German politician
- Thomas Nentwich (born 1975), Austrian football player
