= The Cold Swedish Winter =

BBC radio comedy series

The Cold Swedish Winter is a semi-autobiographical BBC radio comedy sitcom by Danny Robins about Geoff (Adam Riches), a marginally successful London stand-up comic living in Sweden. He has relocated when his girlfriend Linda (Sissela Benn) gets pregnant and decides they should raise their child in her home town, the unpronounceable Yxsjö.

Other regular characters are Linda's father, Sten (Thomas Oredsson), mother, Gunilla (Anna-Lena Bergelin), and Goth arsonist brother Anders (Fredrick Andersson); Geoff's expatriate friend Ian (Robins) and Danish Kurd cafe proprietor Soran (Farshad Kolghi).

Recorded on location, the show was first released in 2014 and the fourth series was broadcast in November and December 2018 with the fifth beginning in December 2020.

== Episodes ==
=== Series 1 (2014) ===
No. overall	No. in series	Title	Original release date
1	1	"Winter"	11 August 2014
Guest appearances: Helen Braunholz-Smith (Jen), Lisa Werlinder (Shop Assistant)
2	2	"Spring"	18 August 2014
3	3	"Summer"	25 August 2014
Guest appearances: Lisa Werlinder (Shop Assistant)
4	4	"Autumn"	1 September 2014
Guest appearances: Joakim Jennefors (Estate Agent/Jorgen), Lisa Werlinder (Doctor)

=== Series 2 (2016) ===
No. overall	No. in series	Title	Original release date
5	1	"Winter"	1 January 2016
Guest appearances: Fredrik Andersson, Thomas Ericsson, Shanthi Rydwall (Actors)
6	2	"Episode 2"	8 January 2016
Guest appearances: André Wickström (Johan), Shanthi Rydwall (Female Steward), Fredrik Andersson (Ice Hockey Announcer)
7	3	"Episode 3"	15 January 2016
Guest appearances: Thomas Ericsson (Pedestrian)
8	4	"Episode 4"	22 January 2016
Guest appearances: Thomas Ericsson, Shanthi Rydwall (Actors)

=== Series 3 (2017) ===
No. overall	No. in series	Title	Original release date
9	1	"Spring: Wedding Venues"	25 August 2017
Guest Appearances: Cecilia Nilsson (Margaretta/Sylvi), Fredrik Andersson (Folk Dancer/Guide), Isak Jansson (Campsite Owner), André Wickström (Lars), Thomas Eriksson (Erik/Waiter), Frank Pitcher (John)
10	2	"Summer: New Swedes"	1 September 2017
Guest appearances: Krister Henriksson (Knut), Ajmal Shamsi (Ashkan), Cecilia Nilsson (Teacher), Thomas Eriksson (Guard/Neighbour), Isak Jansson (The Swedish Sun), Frank Pitcher (John)
11	3	"Autumn: Wedding"	8 September 2017
Guest appearances: Cecilia Nilsson (Ingeborg/Matilda), Thomas Eriksson (Registrar), Frank Pitcher (John)
12	4	"The Latte Pappas"	15 September 2017
Guest appearances: André Wickström (Johan), Thomas Eriksson (Fredrik), Isak Jansson (Tobias), Frank Pitcher (John), Iris Pitcher (Ebba)

=== Series 4 (2018) ===
No. overall	No. in series	Title	Original release date
13	1	"Childhood"	23 November 2018
Guest appearances: Harry Nicolaou (John)
14	2	"Work"	30 November 2018
Guest appearances: Kristoffer Appelquist (Jonas), Mohamed Said (Ahmed), Johanna Wagrell (Carola), Thomas Eriksson (Mattias), Harry Nicolaou (John)
15	3	"Equality"	7 December 2018
Guest appearances: Thomas Eriksson (Mattias), Harry Nicolaou (John), Johanna Wagrell (Woman in Supermarket)
16	4	"Stadsfest"	14 December 2018
Guest appearances: Thomas Eriksson (Man in Loo/Traffic Cop), Harry Nicolaou (John)

=== Series 5 (2020–21) ===
No. overall	No. in series	Title	Original release date
17	1	"Lagom Lockdown"	16 December 2020
Guest Appearances: Mel Hudson (Jean), Thomas Eriksson (Henning), Fredrik Andersson (Customs Guy), Harry Nicolaou (John)
18	2	"An American in Yxsjö"	23 December 2020
Guest Appearances: Nic Sampson (Wilbur), Harry Nicolaou (John)
19	3	"Crayfish Require These Drinks"	30 December 2020
Guest Appearances: Johanna Wagrell (Maria), Harry Nicolaou (John)
20	4	"Vasaloppet"	6 January 2021
Guest Appearances: Thomas Eriksson (Johan), Harry Nicolaou (John)
