= Hirsty's Daily Dose =

- Other names: The Dose; The Capital Breakfast Show
- Genre: Music radio
- Running time: 4 hours (6am to 10am)
- Country of origin: United Kingdom
- Language: English
- Home station: Capital Yorkshire
- Hosted by: Stephanie Hirst; Danny Oakes; Joanne "JoJo" Kelly
- Created by: Stephanie Hirst
- Narrated by: Peter Dickson; Trish Bertram
- Recording studio: Leeds, West Yorkshire
- Original release: 13 January 2003 – 13 June 2014
- Opening theme: V:Music - Rabbit & Hutch (Remix)
- Ending theme: V:Music - Rabbit & Hutch (Remix) - Hirsty's Daily Dose is back tomorrow/Monday. Galaxy/Capital
- Website: Hirsty's Daily Dose
- Podcast: Hirsty's Overdose

Hirsty's Daily Dose, also known as The Dose and The Capital Breakfast Show, is a British radio breakfast show, which aired on Capital Yorkshire for eleven years. It was devised and presented by Stephanie Hirst with Danny Oakes and Joanne "JoJo" Kelly (née Moorhouse), most often referred to as Hirsty, Danny and JoJo.

== History ==
The show first aired on Galaxy 105 at 1:05pm on Sunday 13 January 2003. Hirst moved from hosting the breakfast show on Viking FM in Hull to join the Galaxy team to present their new breakfast show, covering the whole of Yorkshire, bringing Oakes to join current presenter JoJo.

Galaxy was rebranded as Capital on 3 January 2011 as part of a merger of Global Radio's Galaxy and Hit Music networks to form the nine-station Capital radio network. The show and its presenters were retained at the relaunched station.

On 20 June 2014, Hirst announced that she had left Capital, bringing Hirsty's Daily Dose to an end after 11 years on air – the final edition aired a week before the announcement. Drivetime presenter Adam O'Neill took over as the main host of Capital Breakfast with Danny and JoJo remaining co-hosts.

== Features ==
The show used the following features in its broadcasts:

- Anonymous Confessional - A member of the public poses a question, which would only ever be answered anonymously. Listeners then send in their stories, which are read out during the show. This feature often has a warning read by Hirsty broadcast before it to warn people to the often adult nature of the feature.
- Clio Watch - The shows presenters, after consultation with their listeners decided that only women who were attractive drive Renault Clio cars. Listeners, therefore, can contact the show to advise the public on the location of a Clio driver. This feature has also spawned two spin offs: The first, Trophy Wife Watch has listeners on the lookout for young, attractive women who drive cars that it is perceived they cannot afford to own and are therefore in a relationship with a man who is funding her lifestyle, making her a Trophy wife. The second, Fitty 500 launched as a counter claim to Clio Watch, in which it states that attractive women drive a Fiat 500 and not Renault Clios. Fitty 500 became popular in its own right, and was picked up by a local Fiat garage who donated a Fiat 500 to the show initially for promotional purposes, and was eventually given away in a prize segment to the person who "they consider[ed] fitted the Fitty 500 bill"
- Friday Live - Members of the public are invited to be live guests on the show on Friday mornings and go behind the scenes of the show. Friday live guests often also appear on the podcast when it is recorded on a Friday. This was done between 8:10 and 8:40
- He Said, She Said - an in jest agony aunt feature in which a listener sends in their dilemma for JoJo and Danny to give advice on. JoJo gives her answer first and is often quite practical. Danny's answer however is often an over the top response to the situation or a rant at the person asking for advice. This feature runs in a season, alternating with the Anonymous Confessional.
- Last thing; First thing - starting at approximately 6:10, this is the first feature played during the show. Listeners have to send in the last thing they thought about before they went to bed and the first thing they thought about when they got up. The response are read out around 6:30.
- Mindmasher - Brain teaser delivered by the show's producer, Luciano Giaimo, for listeners to text in their answers. Question often asked around 8:55 with the answer given around 9:10.
- Us Lot vs. You Lot - a listener plays a game against one of the shows presenters. Examples of games played include: a general knowledge quiz and a music quiz.
- Old Woman Game - a prank telephone call was sent from the station to a member of the public during which the voice of an elderly woman would speak a limited set of phrases with the aim of keeping the caller on the line for as long as possible. Two listeners would guess how long the call would last and the winner was whoever was closest to the actual call duration.
- Danny Dumps - a listener would call in and ask Danny to ‘dump’ his or her significant other in usually a jaw dropping or Funny way. One example, Danny called and pretended to be a Jeweller, calling to find out the callers partners ring size. Danny let's slip what type of ring it is but then plays the “this is what you could have won”
- Friday Song - Feature used on the show every Friday, recapping every best thing that happened on the show through a song, Normally done at around 9:15

== Podcast ==
Hirsty's Daily Dose had two podcasts in its history. Hirsty's Dosecast ran during the show's Galaxy days and ran to over 150 episodes. The podcast was re-launched after the rebranding to Capital, and was known as Hirsty's Overdose. The Overdose name was previously used as the name to the weekly highlights programme broadcast on Saturday mornings. The format of the podcast is quite straightforward, often consisting of the best bits of the show from the past week, along with some original content, some of which is often only suitable for a podcast.

== Awards ==
Year	Award	Nominated category	Result
2005	Sony Radio Academy Awards	Breakfast Show	Nominated
2005	CRCA Awards	Commercial Radio Presenter(s) Of The Year	Won
2013	Sony Radio Academy Awards	Sony Golden Headphones Award	Nominated
2014	Radio Academy Awards	Breakfast Show of the Year (under 10 million)	Nominated
