= Stephanie Hirst =

English radio presenter (born 1975)

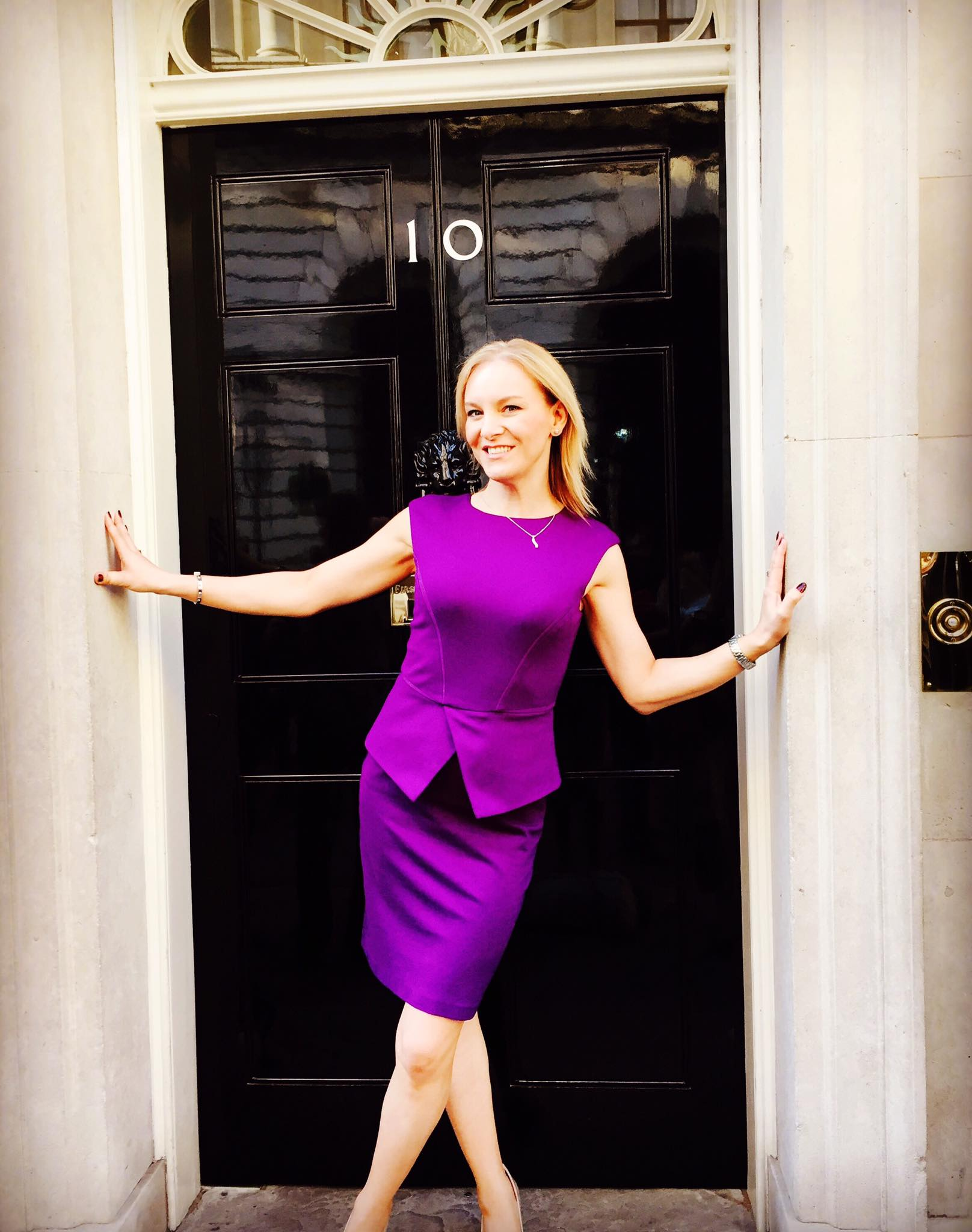
- Hirst at 10 Downing St in 2016
- Born: 1975 (age 50–51); Barnsley, South Yorkshire, England
- Presenting career
- Style: Presenter
- Previous shows: Hit40UK; Hirsty's Daily Dose
- Website: www.stephaniehirst.co.uk

Stephanie Hirst (born 1975) is an English radio and television presenter on Hits Radio and Greatest Hits Radio. She hosted the National UK Top 40 chart show Hit40UK and the weekday breakfast show on Capital Yorkshire, Hirsty's Daily Dose.

== Career ==
In April 2018, Hirst began hosting The Stephanie Hirst Show, broadcast on BBC Radio Leeds.

She made a return to commercial radio for Bauer's Hits Radio Pride, to launch 'Stephanie Hirst's Belters' which is a celebration of 90s 00s & 10s dance anthems, with the first show taking place on 28 August 2020. Due to the show's immediate success, it was extended onto the main national Hits Radio network from August 2021 and airs each Saturday night from 11-2am

In February 2025, she began a new show on Greatest Hits Radio 60's called Spinnin' the 60s. -

In March 2026, she brought her 'Spinnin' format to Greatest Hits Radio replacing Paul Gambaccini each Saturday afternoon 4-7pm with Spinnin' The Decades, including a unique hour of live 'All Request Vinyl' from her personal record collection. -

She is a fellow of The Radio Academy and also a former trustee.

Alongside her radio and TV work, she is also a public speaker, sharing her inspirational "Believe Achieve" keynote to businesses and conferences worldwide.

== Personal life ==
Hirst first publicly talked about her gender transition in October 2014 during an interview with Stephen Nolan on BBC Radio 5 Live. In 2014 and 2015, Hirst was included in The Independent On Sunday's "Rainbow List", an annual celebration of 101 LGBT people in the UK.

In July 2016, Hirst was awarded an honorary doctorate from Leeds Beckett University for her LGBT activism.

In 2016 she was nominated for the Top 10 LGBT+ Celebrity Rising Stars award by the British LGBT Awards.
