= Pete and Geoff =

The duo of Pete and Geoff were DJs Pete Mitchell and Geoff Lloyd, who from January 2003 to December 2005 hosted the breakfast show on Virgin Radio. In the early 1980s, Mitchell was an aspiring musician who moved into management and production. In 1988 he joined Manchester's Piccadilly Radio and went on to be an enthusiastic champion of indie bands of the "Madchester" scene in the early nineties. Around this time, Craig Cash introduced him to Geoff Lloyd. Lloyd was an aspiring comedy writer and performer, and a fellow radio presenter. In 1996 they were asked by Key 103 to co-present its afternoon show.

The duo rapidly established a cult following with their witty and slightly risque banter, and in 1998 won a Sony Radio Academy Award for their show. They were subsequently recruited by Virgin Radio and again rapidly built up a significant audience for its Drivetime Show. By 2003 they were the most popular DJs on the station, and were moved to the Breakfast Show in order to increase the audience. This they did very successfully, sticking to their well-established formula of slightly risque banter about contemporary news and culture, with Mitchell tending to play the "straight man" to the more outrageous Lloyd. Lloyd occasionally courted controversy with some of his remarks, most notoriously when he expressed willingness to eat the limbs of a dead baby to ease poverty. A complaint against the station was upheld, and Lloyd was reprimanded for his comments. Nevertheless, the audience for the show remained strong, despite (or possibly because of) Lloyd's willingness to stray to the edge of acceptability with his remarks.

On 28 November 2005, the duo announced that they were splitting up and leaving the Breakfast Show on Virgin Radio. Their final show together took place on 16 December. Geoff Lloyd remained at Virgin Radio, hosting the Late Show, whilst Pete Mitchell left the station to pursue other projects. Christian O'Connell, from the Breakfast Show on Xfm London, replaced the pair as host of the Breakfast Show.

Pete Mitchell died on 12 March 2020.
