= Pete Mitchell (broadcaster) =

British broadcaster (1958–2020)

- Born: Peter Mitchell; 11 December 1958; Crumpsall, Manchester, England
- Died: 12 March 2020 (aged 61); Stockport, England
- Occupations: Radio DJ and presenter
- Spouse: Helen Mitchell
- Children: 2

Peter Mitchell (11 December 1958 – 12 March 2020) was a British radio DJ and presenter. He was born in Crumpsall, Manchester. Mitchell was a radio presenter for Manchester's Piccadilly Radio, Key 103, BBC Radio 2, BBC Radio 6 Music, Radio X and Absolute Radio, and was one half of duo Pete and Geoff on Virgin Radio (which later became Absolute Radio). His music documentaries have been aired in the US, Canada, Australia and Asia. He later worked for the relaunched Virgin Radio and wrote for the Radio Times, the Daily Express and Q magazine.

Mitchell began his career in 1986 as a sports commentator for Red Rose Radio in Lancashire. He moved to Manchester's Piccadilly Radio in 1989 and, as the station gained a new identity and became Key 103, presented the popular afternoon show and developed, wrote and produced IQ, his own specialist weekend music programme. IQ featured guest interviews and live sets from both established and up-and-coming acts. He championed the indie bands of the Madchester scene in the early 1990s. IQ featured bands such as Oasis, Inspiral Carpets, James, Badly Drawn Boy, 808 State and Happy Mondays.

Mitchell was introduced to Geoff Lloyd in the mid-1990s by actor and writer Craig Cash, star of The Royle Family. Lloyd was an aspiring comedy writer and performer, and a fellow radio presenter. In 1996 Lloyd joined Mitchell on his afternoon radio show. The duo rapidly established a cult following with their witty and slightly risquė banter, and in 1998 won a Sony Radio Academy Award for their show.

Mitchell died of a heart attack on 12 March 2020 after collapsing near his home in Stockport.

== Virgin Radio ==
In 1999 Pete and Geoff were recruited by Virgin Radio UK, where they took over the weekday evening show and covered Chris Evans on the breakfast show, and again rapidly built up a significant audience. The pair took over the drivetime show in early 2002. By 2003 they were the most popular DJs on the station and were moved to the breakfast show to increase the audience. This they did very successfully, sticking to their well-established formula of slightly risquė banter about contemporary news and culture, with Mitchell tending to play the "straight man" to the more outrageous Lloyd. They won another Gold Sony Radio Award for their show.

On 28 November 2005, the duo announced that they were splitting up and leaving the breakfast show on Virgin Radio. Their final show together took place on 16 December. While Lloyd remained at Virgin Radio, Mitchell left for a while to join BBC Radio 2.

In addition to this, Mitchell took over the Saturday sports show Rock & Roll Football when Chris Evans stood down. From 2002 Mitchell also presented a weekly show on his own called Razor Cuts, where he showcased new music and interviewed many bands and artists who picked their favourite tunes and played live on the show. Guests included Morrissey, Lou Reed, Elvis Costello, Pixies, The Killers, New Order, Paul McCartney and Mick Jagger.

In 2018, Mitchell rejoined Virgin Radio UK and presented a monthly documentary series called "Revolutions In Music".

== BBC ==
From April 2006 until May 2009, Mitchell presented shows for BBC Radio 2, featuring interviews with guests including Sam Moore, John Legend, Gloria Jones, The Velvelettes, Ronnie Spector and Noddy Holder. A regular spot named "Where in the World is Carmine?" featured former Vanilla Fudge drummer Carmine Appice. American broadcaster Leslie 'Radio Chick' Gold guested as the show's USA correspondent, while Professor Timothy English looked into plagiarism in music. During his time at BBC Radio 2 Mitchell also presented Sold on Song live with Donovan, and appeared as a fan of Bob Dylan in the BBC radio series Imagine. He also covered many shifts across Radio 2 and BBC Radio 6 Music.

In 2008, Mitchell produced and presented the Radio 2 documentary I'm on My Way, on Northern soul star Dean Parrish; he later produced Spellbound, on guitarist John McGeoch who played with Magazine, Siouxsie and the Banshees, Visage and PiL amongst others. Toerag, the story of Liam Watson, a documentary about one of Britain's most in-demand record producers, presented by Mitchell, was broadcast on 3 May on Radio 2. Watson produced Elephant by the White Stripes, which went to number one around the world, from his little studio in Hackney in East London. The Carmine Appice Story, the tale of the rock drummer with Vanilla Fudge, was broadcast in September on Radio 2.

In 2009, the Motown record label celebrated its 50th birthday. Mitchell indulged his passion for the subject and presented various programmes to mark the occasion. The 6-part series Hitsville USA: 50 Years of Heart & Soul ran weekly from 5 January 2009 on Radio 2 and offered (to quote the Radio Times) "a nourishing insight into the label's rare treasures". Motorcity Blues aired on 10 January on Radio 2, with a fascinating portrait of the city of Detroit and how its events and people have shaped the Motown label. The Sound of Young America went out on Radio 2 on 17 January and told of how the Motown Sound has influenced music today. Mitchell's documentary Toerag was broadcast on 6 Music in July 2009. Spellbound, the story of guitarist John McGeoch, was broadcast on 6 Music in April 2011.

== Xfm ==
Mitchell presented his first Xfm (now Radio X) breakfast show on 15 June 2009 and his alternative radio show Razor Cuts on 21 June 2009. His first Razor Cuts guest was former New Order member bassist Peter Hook, who spoke candidly about the break-up of the legendary band. Guitarist Johnny Marr revealed that he had been offered $50 million to reform The Smiths on the show recently. Other guests included Jarvis Cocker, Shaun Ryder, Paul Weller, Bernard Sumner, Mike Joyce, Delphic, Ian McCulloch, Dave Grohl, Jack White and Courtney Love.

On 9 August 2009 Mitchell presented a The Stone Roses documentary with producer John Leckie about the 20th anniversary of The Stone Roses' debut album. In May 2010 he produced and presented Some Friendly, a documentary on the 20th anniversary of the Charlatans' debut album, where the band and producer Chris Nagle were reunited by Mitchell for the first time since the album was recorded. It was broadcast on 16 May 2010.

Screamadelica and The Second Summer of Love, produced and narrated by Mitchell, aired on Absolute 90s, billed as the UK's only station dedicated to music from that decade, on 26 November 2010 at the end of a week of Primal Scream activity timed to coincide with the band's Screamdelica live dates. It charted the making of the album, including an interview with singer Bobby Gillespie, as well as examining the wider context of the dance music explosion and rave culture, with contributions from The Inspiral Carpets' Clint Boon, Hacienda DJ Dave Haslam and Scream vocalist Denise Johnson.

== Absolute Radio ==
Mitchell presented Absolute Radio Q Radio Show 10 pm, Absolute Radio 90s (Pete Mitchell's 24hr Party People: 8 pm – 10 pm) and Absolute Radio 60s/70s.

He presented the Absolute Radio 60s weekday mid-morning show (10 am – 1 pm), plus the Absolute 60s and Absolute Radio 70s Soul and Funk show Soul Time, which is broadcast on Saturday/Sundays. The show looks at Motown, Northern Soul, funk and Stax records amongst others. He regularly had star guests who have included Earth, Wind & Fire, John Legend, Smokey Robinson, George Clinton, Candi Staton, The O'Jays and Mary Wilson of the Supremes, who pick their favourite soul and funk recording.

He also presented documentaries and interviews across the Absolute Radio network which have included Come On: 50 Years of the Rolling Stones; One Love: the Continuing Story of the Stone Roses; Revolutions: the influence of the Beatles; Inside Joy Division; Hacienda: the World's Greatest Night Club; The Story of the Clash; Here Come the Girls: the story of the Girl Group Sound; Good Times: Nile Rodgers; The Boy from Burnage: the Noel Gallagher Story; and Not Fade Away: the Return of the Rolling Stones.

== Other work ==
Mitchell has appeared on Sky News, Channel 4's Top 100 Albums, Channel 5's Top 100 Singles, ITV's Madonna special, Eggheads for the BBC, Sky One's Hidden Secret, MTV, CNN, Channel 5 news, Pete & Geoff's Top 9s for VH1 and The Royle Family for Granada/BBC—to name but a few. He has written regularly for the Manchester Evening News and often contributed to the Daily Star. During his career he has guest written for some of the UK's most influential music magazines including City Life and Q Magazine. A love of alternative music, along with a passion for funk, soul and Motown has led to various high-profile appearances as a club DJ. Mitchell had also DJed at Manchester venue The Haçienda and at Alan McGee's Death Disco at Notting Hill Arts Club.
