= Absolute Radio =

British Independent National Radio station

Coordinates: 51.5122°N 0.1369°W

- London; United Kingdom
- Frequencies: DAB+: 11D/12A Digital One (UK); DAB: 12C London 1

Programming
- Format: Rock/alternative
- Network: Absolute Radio Network

Ownership
- Owner: Bauer Media Audio UK
- Sister stations: Absolute Radio 60s; Absolute Radio 70s; Absolute Radio 80s; Absolute Radio 90s; Absolute Radio 00s; Absolute Radio 10s; Absolute Radio 20s; Absolute Radio Classic Rock; Absolute Radio Country

History
- First air date: 30 April 1993 (as Virgin 1215); 29 September 2008 (as Absolute Radio)
- Last air date: FM Frequencies; 16 December 2018 (West Midlands); 17 May 2021 (London); AM Frequencies; 19 January 2023 (National)
- Former names: Virgin Radio (1993–2008)
- Former frequencies: FM Frequencies; 105.2 MHz (West Midlands); 105.8 MHz (London); AM Frequencies; 1197 kHz (National); 1215 kHz (National); 1233 kHz (National); 1242 kHz (National); 1260 kHz (Kent)

Technical information
- Licensing authority: Ofcom

Links
- Webcast: Rayo(UK only)
- Website: absoluteradio.co.uk

Absolute Radio is a British digital radio station owned and operated by Bauer Media Audio UK as part of the Absolute Radio Network. It broadcasts nationally across the UK via digital audio broadcasting.

The station focuses on alternative and indie music.

== History ==
=== 1993–1997: Virgin Radio launch and early years ===
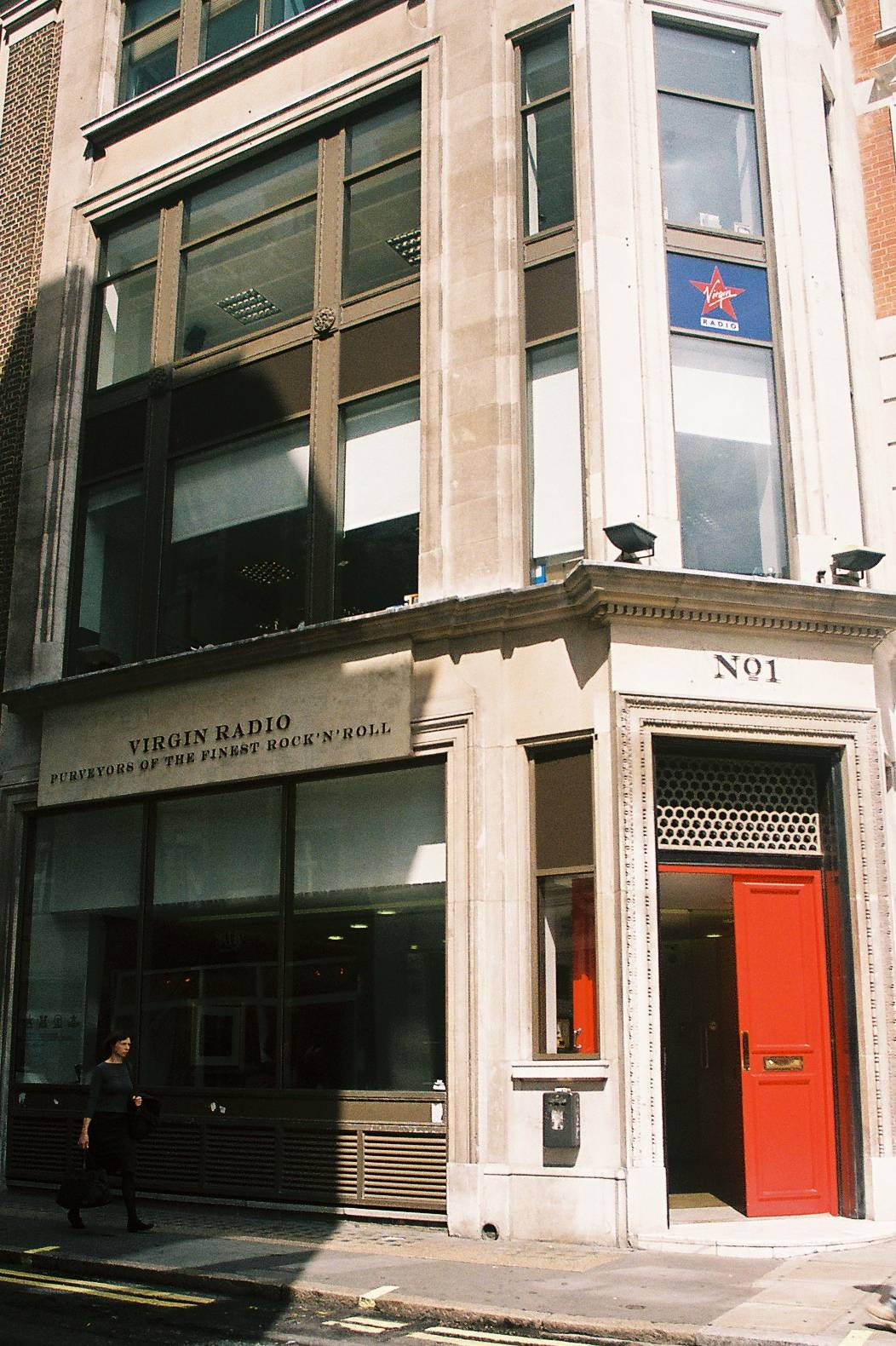
No 1 Golden Square with "Virgin Radio" branding, 1993–2008

The Broadcasting Act 1990 allowed for the launch of independent national radio (INR) stations in the United Kingdom. The Radio Authority was mandated to award three INR licences, one of which (INR1) had to be for a "non-pop" station (which was awarded to Classic FM), and one of which had to be for a predominantly speech-based service (this would be advertised later as INR3 and awarded to Talk Radio). The remaining licence was to be open to "all-comers". The licences were to be awarded to the highest cash bidder, providing that the applicant met criteria set down in the Broadcasting Act.

The second national licence, INR2, would take over the 1197 kHz and 1215 kHz medium wave (AM) frequencies, which were to be relinquished by BBC Radio 3. The licence was advertised in October 1991 and five organisations bid: the Independent National Broadcasting Company of Sheffield, which bid £4,010,000 per year; a TV-am/Virgin consortium (£1,883,000); Chiltern Radio Network's 20/20 Radio (£1,311,000); Radio Clyde's Score Radio (£701,000); and a consortium of CLT, Harvey Goldsmith and RTÉ (£211,000). The TV-am/Virgin consortium was awarded the licence in April 1992, after the Radio Authority said that it was not satisfied that Independent National Broadcasting would be able to sustain the service. Later that year, TV-am lost its ITV franchise and its stake in the radio station was sold in March 1993 to Apax Partners, JP Morgan Investment Corporation and Sir David Frost.

The station launched as Virgin 1215 at 12:15 pm on 30 April 1993. The original line-up of DJs included Richard Skinner, Russ Williams, Jono Coleman, Mitch Johnson, Graham Dene, Nick Abbot, Wendy Lloyd, Tommy Vance, Emperor Rosko and Dave Fanning. Chris Evans was also hired to present a Saturday morning show, following his success at BBC GLR in the weekend mid-morning slot. The show, The Big Red Mug Show, was sponsored by Nescafé. Other key presenters included Nicky Horne, Howard Pearce, Lynn Parsons and Jonathan Ross.

The first song played was INXS' cover version of the Steppenwolf song "Born to be Wild". Richard Branson was the first voice to be heard, live from the Virgin Megastore in Manchester, with Richard Skinner the first voice back in the London studios. Skinner was also programme director, a role he shared with John Revell. John Pearson was launch sales director, a role he had previously held at LBC. Andy Mollett was launch finance director. David Campbell, previously managing director of one of Virgin's post-production television companies, was the chief executive at launch.

From before its launch on AM, Virgin Radio was campaigning for a national FM network. Initially, it lobbied for Radio 4's FM network to be made available and then, when the Radio Authority launched a consultation on the use of the 105–108 MHz band, it lobbied for it to be set aside as a national network. The Radio Authority decided, however, that 105–108 MHz would be licensed to new local and regional stations and Virgin Radio applied for and won one of the new FM licences advertised in London as a result.

Virgin Radio launched on 105.8 MHz FM in London on 10 April 1995 beginning with a message from broadcaster David Frost at 6 am followed by the Russ 'n' Jono breakfast show. Part of the licence requirements for the London service meant that a daily London opt-out was broadcast on FM, presented initially by Rowland Rivron.

Within a year, Virgin Group was considering the next steps for the radio station, including the option of a flotation or buying back the shares of JP Morgan, Apax and Sir David Frost. In May 1997, it was announced that Capital Radio had agreed to acquire Virgin Radio in an £87 million deal. Capital's plans included moving Virgin Radio from 1 Golden Square to Capital's Leicester Square building and splitting programming between the AM and FM services. The Radio Authority approved the acquisition, but Nigel Griffiths, the Consumer Affairs Minister, referred the takeover to the Monopolies and Mergers Commission (MMC). The MMC report into the takeover would not be issued until January 1998, and would recommend that the deal could only go ahead if Capital Gold was sold or Virgin's London FM licence was excluded from the deal. However, the delay in approval of the Capital acquisition would ultimately lead to the deal not going through.

In January 1997, Chris Evans left his role as presenter of the Radio 1 Breakfast Show as a result of a disagreement between him and the programme controller Matthew Bannister (Evans had asked for Fridays off to allow more time for him to work on his Channel 4 television show, TFI Friday). Evans was keen to return to radio and it had been reported that his agent, Michael Foster, had approached Matthew Bannister to ask if Evans would be allowed to be return to Radio 1, and he had gone as far as commencing negotiations to buy Talk Radio.

Richard Branson wanted Evans to work for Virgin Radio, so much so that he joined him on a Concorde flight to New York to try to persuade him to join as the drive time presenter. In the end, Virgin Radio hired Evans to present the breakfast show, replacing the incumbent Russ 'n' Jono show (presented by Russ Williams and Jonathan Coleman). His show started on 13 October 1997, the same day that Zoë Ball started as Evans' replacement on Radio 1. The initial contract would only be for ten weeks, until the MMC announced its decision on the Capital Radio takeover. Evans approached David Campbell to discuss buying the radio station and, with Michael Foster's help, they put together a deal to buy it with venture capital supplied by Apax Partners and Paribas, with Virgin Group retaining a 20% stake in the business. The deal was announced on 8 December 1997, and would see the formation of the Ginger Media Group, an umbrella company overseeing Virgin Radio and producing programmes such as TFI Friday.

=== 1998–2000: The Ginger Media Group ===
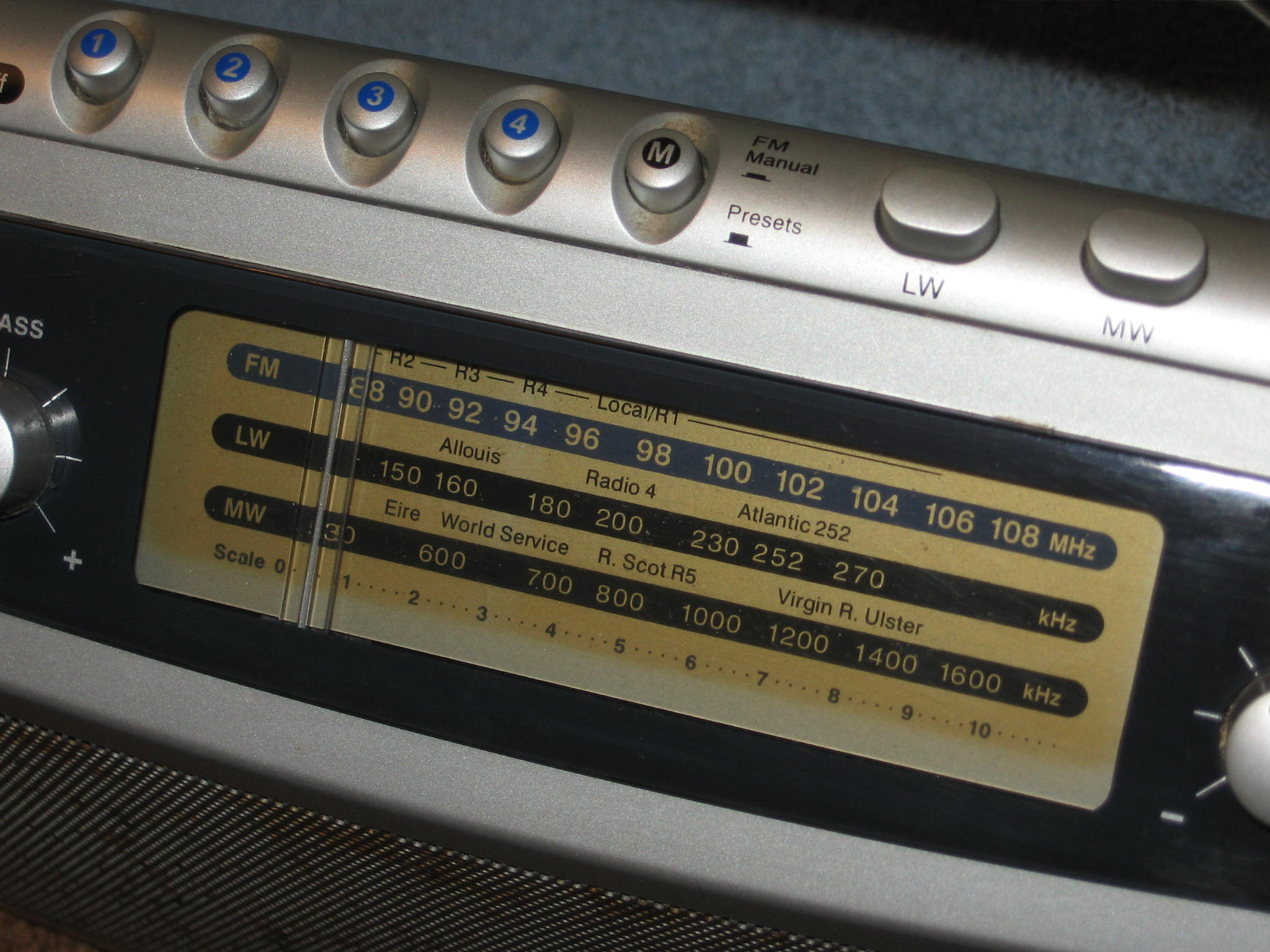
Roberts 928 radio, circa early 2000s, showing "Virgin R." markings for 1197-1242 kHz AM/MW frequencies. (By the time Virgin Radio launched in the 1990s, station name markings like these were no longer as common on new sets).

Evans' ownership of Virgin Radio started well, with a breakfast show audience increase of 660,000 to 2.2m in his first three months. In August 1998, Evans took a spur of the moment decision one weekend to launch a Saturday afternoon show called Rock 'n' Roll Football, which continues to be broadcast on Absolute Radio. From 5 October 1998, Virgin Radio started simulcasts of the breakfast show on Sky One each morning for an hour between 7.30 and 8.30 am When a track was played on the radio, viewers would see a video at the same time.

The start of the new football season in August 1999 saw Terry Venables join Russ Williams in a show that would precede Rock 'n' Roll Football. At the end of 1999, at a time when TV programme Who Wants To Be A Millionaire? had yet to give away its top prize, Virgin Radio set a broadcasting first when Clare Barwick won £1 million at the culmination of "Someone's Going to Be a Millionaire".

The management team at the Ginger Media Group were considering expansion opportunities, including a plan to acquire the Daily Star newspaper from United News & Media, and hire Piers Morgan to edit it. Their plans were stalled, however, when the shareholders got cold feet. Evans wrote in his autobiography that "the management wanted to stick to our original brief of expansion, whereas our investors only cared about extracting the added value."

=== 2000–2008: SMG ownership ===
The management team therefore set itself on a strategy to sell the business three years ahead of schedule. It hired Goldman Sachs to run the sale process, and considered a public flotation, before selling to the Scottish Media Group for £225 million in March 2000. The Scottish Media Group, which owned Scottish Television and the Herald newspaper, fought off other bidders including Clear Channel, NRJ and Guardian Media Group. Evans personally made £75 million out of the sale.

Evans was subsequently fired by his new employer in 2001 for failing to report into work for five consecutive days while reportedly partying with his then wife Billie Piper.

Chief executive John Pearson, who had been with the station since before launch, resigned in April 2005, and was replaced by Fru Hazlitt, who had previously been managing director of Yahoo! UK and Ireland.

On 13 June 2006, SMG plc signed a deal with YooMedia to make Virgin Radio available on Freeview. Long before the station's AM transmitters were closed in January 2023, it had always placed a great emphasis on other methods of transmission than medium wave, as the 1215 kHz frequency suffered from considerable interference, particularly after dark – BBC Radio 1, which used 1215 kHz for its first eleven years on air, moved to higher-quality medium wave frequencies (now used by Talksport) in 1978 primarily for this reason.

=== 2008–2013: Acquisition by Times of India and rebranding as Absolute Radio ===
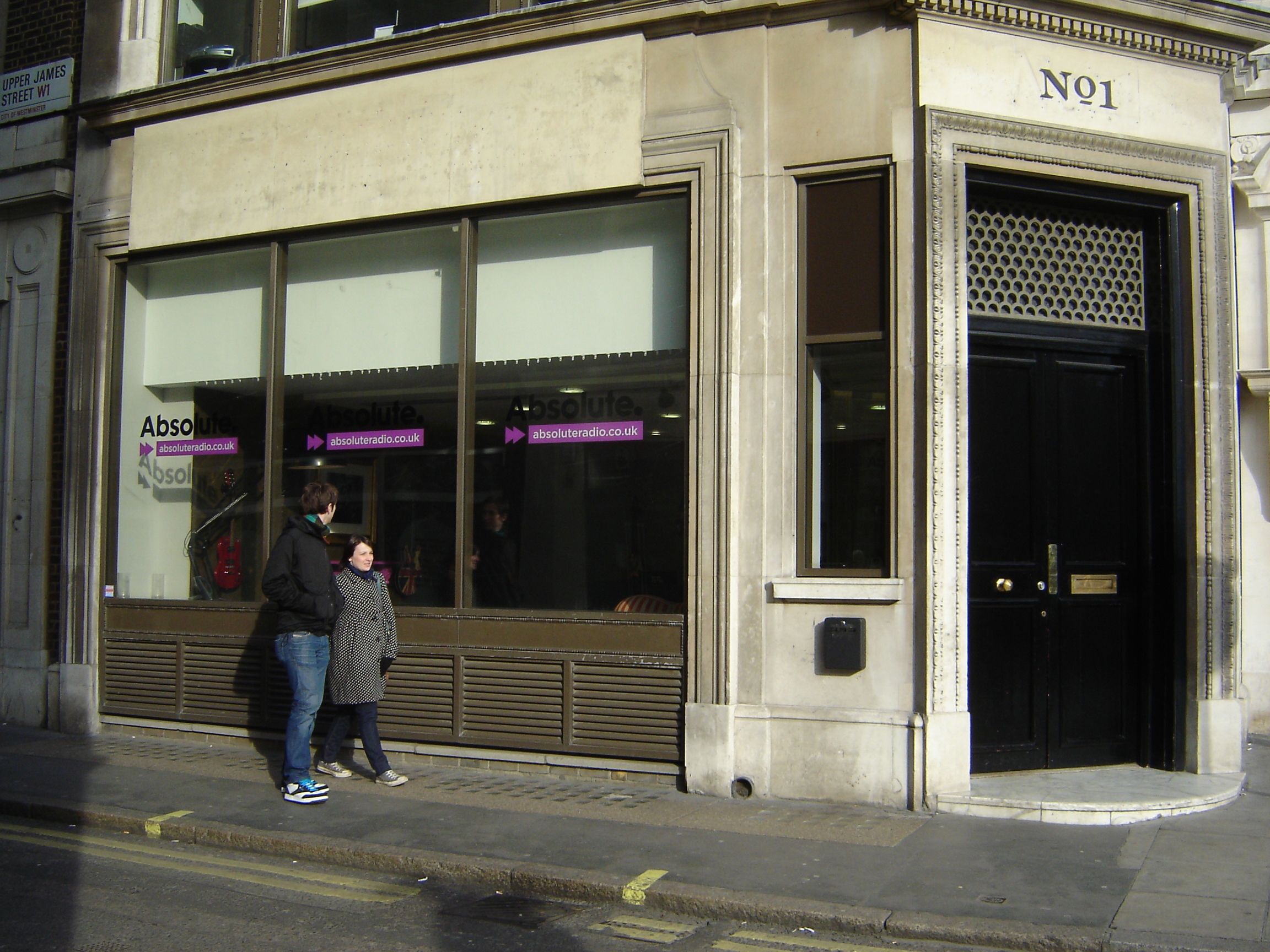
No 1 Golden Square with Absolute Radio branding

On 12 April 2007, it was announced that SMG plc was to sell Virgin Radio, to enable the company to focus on its television station, STV. On 30 May 2008 SMG sold Virgin Radio to TIML Golden Square Limited, a subsidiary of The Times Group for £53.2 million, with £15 million set aside for rebranding. TIML was given 90 days' grace in which to rebrand the station. As part of the deal, Absolute Radio International, operator of two FM licences in Oxford, would manage the station.

On 1 September 2008 it was announced that Virgin Radio would be rebranded as Absolute Radio on 28 September. At the same time, changes to the line-up were made known with JK and Joel, Robin Burke, Tony Hadley and John Osborne leaving the station and Allan Lake, Joanna Russell (of Trent FM's Jo & Twiggy) and Tim Shaw joining, though Osborne would return shortly after. The last song to be played on Virgin Radio was "American Pie" by Don McLean and the first to be played on Absolute Radio was, following the results of an online survey run by the station, "Absolute Beginners" by David Bowie and "A Day in the Life" by The Beatles. Listening figures for the final quarter of 2008 showed that almost 20% of former Virgin Radio listeners had been lost since the rebranding to Absolute Radio.

The Virgin Radio brand relaunched via DAB and online on 30 March 2016, following a new partnership with Wireless Group and approval of its digital terrestrial commercial radio licence by Ofcom in March 2015.

=== 2013–present: Acquisition by Bauer Media ===
On 29 July 2013, Bauer Media Group announced it intended to purchase Absolute from The Times Group for an amount believed to be between £20m and £25m, pending regulatory approval. The deal was cleared by the Office of Fair Trading on 23 December.

Subsequently, by September 2014, all other London-based Bauer stations moved from Mappin House to a refurbished One Golden Square, creating a new national radio hub.

Bauer Radio announced in July 2015 that Absolute Radio would be taking up the 105.2 FM frequency in the West Midlands, previously held by Planet Rock. Absolute launched on 105.2 FM on 7 September 2015. The station ended transmission on that frequency on 16 December 2018, following Bauer's decision to broadcast Greatest Hits Radio on FM across the West Midlands.

In March 2021, Ofcom approved Bauer's application for permission to alter the FM licence held by the London FM relay of Absolute Radio, enabling the frequency to be used to provide a London variant of Greatest Hits Radio. Absolute Radio continued to be available by way of its national AM and digital transmissions. The change took place on 17 May.

At midnight on 20 January 2023, the station stopped broadcasting on AM; the station chose to bookend this side of the frequency by signing it off with the first song played on Absolute Radio in 2008, David Bowie's "Absolute Beginners", followed immediately before with a brief audio package saluting the AM portion's history. Ofcom issued Bauer Radio a £25,000 fine and revoked the medium wave licence on 13 February 2023.

On 12 December 2023, Absolute Radio was removed from Freesat TV platform, followed by Sky and Virgin Media TV platforms on 13 December, along with every other radio station owned by Bauer Media on either of the three TV platforms, including Absolute Radio 80s, Absolute Radio 90s, Absolute Radio Classic Rock, Hits Radio, Greatest Hits Radio, Kiss, Magic, Jazz FM and Planet Rock.

In 2022, Bauer said it would vacate One Golden Square and move to The Lantern, 75 Hampstead Road in Euston. The last broadcasts from the Golden Square studios took place in April 2024.

== Programming ==
=== Audience and playlist ===
Virgin Radio launched aiming at a target group of 24-to 44-year-olds and with a focus on album music, arguing that "singles chart shows on Radio 1 and local commercial radio were outdated because albums outsold singles by three to one." It would provide a blend of recent album tracks and chart music from the past 25 years and aim to fill the "hole in the middle" between BBC Radio 1 and local commercial radio, which were specifically aimed at young audiences, and "gold" stations offering classic hits.

A year after launch, David Campbell was quoted as saying that "the music policy was wrong, even though Virgin had lots of research to suggest it was doing what listeners said they wanted. We did something we should never do: pursue critical acclaim, playing obscure tracks, gaining the praise of the music press." The station's approach had been to mix in more familiar music.

Fru Hazlitt, when interviewed for The Guardian in September 2006, described the type of music the station championed: "It's pretty much mainstream rock festival-type music. Razorlight, Keane. These bands are becoming some of the biggest in the world."

When announcing the rebrand as Absolute Radio on the One Golden Square blog, Clive Dickens, chief operating officer, noted that the station would be "sticking with real music – not manufactured rubbish – and we're building on the amount of live music we do – we're just going to discover more of all of it."

The music policy continues to focus on guitar-based rock, mostly British. In a blog post in February 2009, Head of Music James Curran noted that the 30 most-played artists in the first four months of Absolute Radio had been: Manic Street Preachers, Coldplay, Arctic Monkeys, Snow Patrol, Kings of Leon, The Killers, Oasis, Travis, U2, Placebo, Suede, Kaiser Chiefs, Kasabian, Queen, Keane, Stereophonics, Caesars, Elbow, Bruce Springsteen, R.E.M., Nickelback, The Offspring, Aerosmith, The Rolling Stones, Biffy Clyro, The Beatles, David Bowie, Nirvana, The Police and Blur.

=== Premium service ===
On 14 July 2022, Absolute Radio launched Absolute Radio Premium where users can listen to the various stations without advert breaks and with the ability to skip a song. The service also offers five exclusive stations: Absolute Radio Acoustic, Absolute Radio Classic Country, Andy Bush's Indie Disco 24/7, Through the Decades and Haven't Heard It for Ages.

=== Notable DJs ===
==== Weekdays ====
- Dave Berry
- Leona Graham
- Danielle Perry
- Andy Bush and Richie Firth
- Sarah Champion

==== Weekends ====
- Jon Richardson
- Chris McCausland
- Louise Wener
- Claire Sturgess
- Matt Forde
- Skin
- Tim Burgess

=== Notable former presenters ===
Virgin Radio's original line-up included Russ Williams, Richard Skinner, Mitch Johnson, Tommy Vance, Jonathan Coleman and Nick Abbot.

Other past presenters on the network include Danny Baker, Robin Banks, Kelly-Anne Smith, Vicki Butler-Henderson, Robin Burke. Martin Collins, Gary Davies, Daryl Denham, Chris Evans (who also owned the station), Ben Jones, Neil Francis, Alan Freeman, Tony Hadley (from Spandau Ballet), Nicky Horne, Janey Lee Grace, Kevin Greening, Gary King, Jason King, Phil Kennedy, Jeremy Kyle, Allan Lake, Iain Lee, Geoff Lloyd, Tim Lovejoy, Pete Mitchell, Al Murray, Christian O'Connell, John Osborne, Lynn Parsons, Steve Penk, Annabel Port, Vic Reeves, Joel Ross, Jo Russell, Holly Samos, Harriet Scott, Tim Shaw, Graeme Smith, Suggs, David Tennant, Clive Warren, Ray Cokes, Dave Gorman, Pete Donaldson, Frank Skinner and Jason Manford.

=== Sport ===
From the 2010–11 to the 2015–16 seasons, Absolute Radio broadcast live commentary of 32 Premier League games on Saturday afternoons. Ian Wright joined the station to host a post-match phone-in programme, as well as a regular music show on Absolute Radio 90s and a football podcast.

From 2013 to 2014, Absolute Radio held UK radio rights to American football's National Football League.

=== Comedy ===
In 2021, Absolute Radio commissioned its first scripted comedy series, Rockanory. Based on a number of Rock Star Babylon stories by former Now Show comedian Jon Holmes, the series featured the voices of Shaun Keaveny, Jon Culshaw and Jake Yapp. Short episodes were broadcast Monday to Thursday at 11 pm for six weeks from 6 September 2021.

== Broadcast ==
=== Studios ===
The station broadcast from studios in One Golden Square until April 2024. It currently broadcasts from Bauer's building The Lantern, near Euston railway station in London.

=== AM transmission ===
The 1215 kHz frequency (247 metres) was used, in selected areas only, by the BBC Light Programme until 1967. It was then used nationally as the original home of BBC Radio 1 until 22 November 1978, then from 23 November 1978 until 28 February 1992 by BBC Radio 3.

In 1992–1993, Virgin replaced the valve-based transmitters at the ex-BBC transmitter sites it acquired with solid-state transmitters.

Virgin Radio 1215 AM then broadcast from 30 April 1993 to 28 September 2008, and Absolute Radio 1215 AM broadcast from 29 September 2008 to 19 January 2023.

In a number of areas, particularly where the signals from the main 1215 transmitters overlapped with each other, the station used filler transmitters on different frequencies.

=== End of AM broadcasting ===
On Wednesday 4 January 2023, Bauer Media Group announced that all the station's remaining AM transmitters would be turned off and that it would no longer be broadcasting on AM from Friday 20 January, turning Absolute Radio into a digital-only station.

For the last few weeks, taking advantage of the separate satellite feed to the AM transmitter sites, the commercial breaks split-linked, being replaced on AM by the presenter of the show that was on reading the pending closedown script, then Leona Graham reading the same script as the station voice, then part of a radio-themed song being played before programming cut back in. On Leona's own show, to avoid duplicating her announcement, she introduced the radio-themed songs, even fulfilling requests.

The station closed on AM at midnight on Friday 20 January 2023, with "Absolute Beginners" by David Bowie being the last ever song being broadcast on its AM frequencies. Ten minutes before going off air, the station played a tribute to their former AM frequencies, introduced by Jay Lawrence (the presenter of the last normal show that had just been on), and starting with clips from BBC Light Programme (up to 1967), BBC Radio 1 (1967–1978) and BBC Radio 3 (1978–1992), through its life as Virgin 1215 (1993–2008) and ending with the relaunch as Absolute Radio (late 2008) and the aforementioned song. The last words the announcers said were, "...and to 1215 AM: Thanks. You were brilliant." During this split link, the digital version of Absolute Radio ran an Elton John-related segment.

From midnight on Friday 20 January 2023, a closedown loop (read by Leona Graham as the station voice) carried information advising listeners stating that Absolute Radio "is no longer available on AM" and redirecting listeners to DAB, and the Absolute Radio mobile and smart speaker applications.

On Monday 23 January 2023, the transmitters for its AM service began to be switched off. Transmission of the closedown loop that carried information about Absolute Radio's other platforms stopped at 2:15 pm on Thursday 26 January 2023 from the station's last AM transmitter to be switched off, in Lisnagarvey, Northern Ireland (with the very last words being "thanks for listening to Absolute Radio-") but the loop remained playing on the satellite feed to the AM transmitters for many months afterwards, until that was finally removed.

Transmitter Name	Coverage	Frequency (kHz)	EMRP (kW)	Grid Reference	Air date
** Boston	Lincolnshire	1242 (off air)	2	TF260448	2 September 1994
** Brighton (Southwick)	Sussex	1197 (off air)	1.1	TQ234051	9 November 1993
** Brookmans Park	London, Hertfordshire, Essex, South Bedfordshire	1215 (off air)	125	TL259050	3 August 1993
** Chesterton Fen	South and Central Cambridgeshire	1197 (off air)	0.2	TL477608	2 September 1994
** Dartford Tunnel	Dartford Tunnel	1215 (off air)	0.004	TQ571769	8 March 1993
** Droitwich	West Midlands	1215 (off air)	105	SO929663	8 March 1993
** Fareham	South Hampshire and Isle of Wight	1215 (off air)	1	SU546058	9 March 1993
** Fern Barrow	Dorset	1197 (off air)	0.25	SZ070926	11 March 1993
** Gloucester	Gloucestershire	1197 (off air)	0.3	SO841230	14 March 1993
** Greenside Scalp	East Tayside	1242 (off air)	0.5	NO431290	9 March 1993
** Guildford (Pirbright)	West Surrey and North East Hampshire	1260 (off air)	0.5	SU959541	24 December 1993
** Hoo	North and West Kent, South and Central Essex	1197 (off air)	2	TQ790720	15 March 1993
** Hull	East Riding of Yorkshire, Northern Lincolnshire	1215 (off air)	0.32	TA169258	15 March 1993
** Kings Heath	Northamptonshire	1233 (off air)	0.5	SP740633	7 November 1993
** Lisnagarvey	Northern Ireland	1215 (off air)	16	IJ258619	8 March 1993
** Lydd	South East Kent and South East Sussex	1260 (off air)	2	TR049208	2 April 1995
** Manningtree	South East Suffolk and North East Essex	1233 (off air)	0.5	TM123295	6 November 1993
** Moorside Edge	North West and Yorkshire	1215 (off air)	200	SE070154	8 March 1993
** Oxford	Oxfordshire	1197 (off air)	0.25	SP567105	12 March 1993
** Plymouth	Devon	1215 (off air)	1.1	SX490585	15 March 1993
** Postwick	East Norfolk and North East Suffolk	1215 (off air)	1.2	TG303086	16 March 1993
** Redmoss	Aberdeen and East Grampian	1215 (off air)	2.3	NJ942024	25 March 1993
** Redruth	Cornwall	1215 (off air)	2	SW709403	28 July 1997
** Sheffield	South Yorkshire	1233 (off air)	0.3	SK348849	6 November 1993
** Sideway	Staffordshire	1242 (off air)	0.5	SJ876434	9 July 1993
** Stockton	Cleveland	1242 (off air)	1	NZ420218	15 March 1993
** Swindon	Wiltshire, East Gloucestershire, East Berkshire and West Oxfordshire	1233 (off air)	0.1	SU129859	11 November 1993
** Torbay	Devon	1197 (off air)	1	SX878630	19 March 1993
** Trowell	Nottinghamshire	1197 (off air)	0.5	SK506398	27 March 1993
** Wallasey	Merseyside	1197 (off air)	0.4	SJ305926	27 March 1993
** Washford	South Wales, Avon, Somerset	1215 (off air)	100	ST058410	11 March 1993
** Westerglen	Central Scotland	1215 (off air)	100	NS868773	10 March 1993
** Wrekenton	Tyne and Wear	1215 (off air)	2.2	NZ274598	18 March 1993

=== Satellite distribution ===
In the summer of 1993, Virgin Radio began broadcasting in stereo on the Astra 1A satellite on an audio sub-carrier of the Sky News channel. This service ceased on 1 July 2001 in anticipation of Sky's cessation of its analogue satellite service. Virgin Radio was one of the first 20 radio stations which joined the Sky Digital service on 20 November 1999. Carried on Astra 2A, it launched on the channel 917 of the Sky EPG, and then could be found on Astra 2G as Absolute Radio on channel 0107 of SKY UK EPG. Then at the end of 2023 Absolute Radio and its sister channels were removed from Sky after their owner wanted to focus on a more digital market.

Absolute Radio also broadcasts through the Eutelsat 9B satellite unencrypted signal at 12.092 MHz, H polarization, azimuth 9°E.

=== FM transmission ===
The station was available on 105.8 FM from the Crystal Palace transmitting station in London. This transmission began in 1995. In February 2021 Bauer applied to Ofcom for permission to amend the FM broadcast licence to allow the frequency to be used for a London relay of Greatest Hits Radio; Absolute Radio will remain available in London through its retained digital outlets.

On 23 March 2021, following a consultation, Ofcom announced that Greatest Hits Radio would be taking over the 105.8 FM frequency on 17 May 2021

The station was previously available in the West Midlands on 105.2 FM from the Sutton Coldfield transmitter between 7 September 2015 and 16 December 2018.

== Website and internet broadcasting ==
Virgin Radio launched its first website on 7 March 1996. Designed by AKQA, it hosted a live RealAudio stream, making it the first European radio station to stream 24-hours a day on the internet. The station went on to redesign the website a further six times as Virgin Radio. Streaming audio formats and presentation developed over time: QuickTime streaming was added in July 1999, an interactive media player launched in October 1999, an Ogg-Vorbis stream was launched in June 2003, and HE-AAC and Ogg-FLAC streams were launched in December 2009. In Autumn 2012 it launched the Opus Streaming Trial as part of the Listen Labs, including streams for all seven stations in 24, 64 and 96 kbit/s. This trial was cancelled without further notice in autumn 2014, along with the live webcams and the public playlist API.

In 2001, Virgin Radio joined the Measurecast and Arbitron internet broadcasting measurement services. Both measurement services have since closed. In 2009, Absolute Radio started publishing its internet listening and download statistics.

Virgin Radio was also among the first to explore the opportunities for delivering its services to mobile phones. It took part in a joint venture with Ericsson in 1999 to investigate the use of third-generation (3G) mobile phone technologies for radio, launched a WAP site in 2000 and took part in a trial in 2001 with Crown Castle and Manx Telecom to explore the use of 3G phones to add interactivity to digital radio broadcasts. In 2009, Absolute Radio launched an application for the Apple iPhone and tagging for the Apple iPod Nano. In 2010 applications were released for the Amazon Kindle, the Nokia Ovi Store, the BlackBerry and Windows Phone 7 and Absolute Radio was selected as a launch partner for the Apple iAd mobile advertising network.

In January 2014, Absolute Radio Network has restricted the access to the internet radio on their own website to UK listeners only, and removed their apps for iPhone and Android in non-UK app stores.

== Sister stations ==
A number of subsidiary stations to Virgin Radio and Absolute Radio have been launched as online and digital radio services over recent years, many being established during the period when SMG plc was in charge of the station. The stations were collectively known as the Virgin Radio Network (now the Absolute Radio Network). All Absolute branded channels broadcast online and via smartphone apps, with several also transmitted over DAB and digital television platforms. The line-up of stations within the network has changed over time, and those currently on air are:

=== Absolute Radio Classic Rock ===
A radio station on DAB, Virgin Media, Sky and the internet playing classic rock from the 1960s to the 1990s. Launched as Virgin Radio Classic Rock in 2000 as part of SMG Radio's strategy to trade total network listening hours at a time when analogue listening hours had been falling. The service was rebranded as Absolute Radio Classic Rock in 2008.

=== Absolute Radio 60s ===
Launched on 22 November 2011, Absolute 60s is the sixth radio station launched under the Absolute branding. The station is broadcast on DAB, some digital television networks, and online. The station has defined itself as "the home of the Beatles, Stones and Mo-Town". With The Beatles and The Rolling Stones as highlights of the station's broadcasts, it plays music originating from the 1960s. Pete Mitchell was the main daytime presenter, returning to Golden Square: he was last on Virgin Radio in 2005 hosting the Breakfast show with Geoff Lloyd.

=== Absolute Radio 70s ===
Launched on 29 November 2011, Absolute 70s is the seventh radio station launched under the Absolute branding. The station is broadcast on DAB and online. With Rod Stewart, David Bowie and Prince as highlights of the station's broadcast, it plays music originating from the 1970s. Richard Skinner, another previous DJ from the Virgin Radio days, returned to Golden Square to feature on this station.

=== Absolute Radio 80s ===
A radio station launched on 4 December 2009 on DAB, Freesat, Sky, Virgin Media and the internet which plays classic hits and is aimed at "reluctant adults" who want to reconnect with the tunes of their youth.

=== Absolute Radio 90s ===
Absolute Radio 90s launched on 21 June 2010 on DAB to a 13 million population in London, Essex, Wiltshire, Bristol, Berkshire and Bath. The station is also available on Sky 0201 and online via website and mobile smartphones. The first song to be played on the station was "Roll with It" by Oasis.

=== Absolute Radio 00s ===
Absolute Radio 00s launched on 10 December 2010, online and on DAB in London. After an internet poll, the first song played was "Mr. Brightside" by The Killers.

=== Absolute Radio 10s ===
Absolute Radio 10s launched on 18 November 2019 and operates online and on DAB in London. The first song played by presenter Jay Lawrence was Bastille with "Pompeii".

=== Absolute Radio 20s ===
Absolute Radio 20s launched on 24 February 2020 and operates solely online. The first song played was "Instant History" by Biffy Clyro.

=== Absolute Radio Country ===
Absolute Radio Country previously launched as Country Hits Radio in 2019 before being rebranded on 17 May 2021. The first song to play after the relaunch was "Jolene" by Dolly Parton. In June 2022, an Absolute Radio Classic Country streaming service was added to their Absolute Radio Premium subscription package.

=== Absolute Radio Premium ===
Bauer launched a subscription streaming service for Absolute Radio and KISS, which included five new advert-free radio services under the Absolute Radio brand, alongside the original ten Absolute Radio channels. Launching at the end of June 2022, the channels included 24/7 versions of Andy Bush's Indie Disco programme and Haven't Heard It For Ages programme feature, and channels called Through The Decades, Absolute Radio Classic Country and Absolute Radio Acoustic. On 14 November 2022, three more stations were added to the service called Absolute Radio 50s, Absolute Radio Movies and Absolute Radio Terrace Anthems

=== Absolute Radio You ===
This is a pop up service based around a competition, which gives the listener the chance to pitch a new service to Absolute with the winning entry appearing each February. The winning idea of the 2024 competition came from Scottish sisters Rachael and Emma Hare, and is called Absolute Radio Sisters. The service, whose strapline is ‘Where Sibling Rivalry Matters’, plays a mixture of music from the 1990s and 2000s, and will be on air from 12 to 22 February 2024. This pop-up follows Absolute Radio Natalie in 2022 ‘Where sing-alongs matter’ and Absolute Radio Kevin, which played debut singles and tracks from debut albums in 2023

== Former spin-off stations ==
=== Absolute Radio Extra ===
Established in 2010, Absolute Radio Extra enabled Absolute to carry its Premier League football coverage on DAB. During match coverage, the analogue frequencies of Absolute were split, with the London 105.8 FM service carrying scores-and-music show Rock 'n Roll Football, and the national 1215 AM service carrying match commentary. On DAB, the main Absolute service carried Rock 'n Roll Football, with Extra carrying match commentary. Extra was also used for coverage of music festivals and events (such as V Festival) in addition to the coverage available on the main station.

Absolute Radio Extra has subsequently ceased operation: the core Absolute service on DAB continues to relay the shared programming output of the national AM/London FM service.

=== Absolute Radio 40s ===
Absolute Radio 40s was a pop-up station in May 2020, which celebrated the 75th anniversary of VE Day. The station used the 1215 MW frequency to play songs from The Andrews Sisters, Vera Lynn, Billie Holiday, Judy Garland, Glenn Miller, Bing Crosby, Doris Day and Gracie Fields for 24 hours with Dave Berry, Leona Graham and Claire Sturgess presenting shows, which included archive and reminisces from VE Day veterans. Absolute Radio 40s was also found online and on DAB.

=== Absolute Xtreme ===
A radio station on DAB, Virgin Media, Sky and the Internet, playing new music. Absolute Xtreme was launched (as Virgin Radio Xtreme) on 5 September 2005, by Lali Parikh (Station Manager) with Steve Harris being the main on-air talent. On 4 December 2009, Absolute Xtreme was replaced on DAB and digital TV by Absolute Radio 80s.

== Other pre-Absolute spin-off stations ==
=== dabbl ===
dabbl was a user-controlled music radio station broadcast on the Internet and selected local DAB multiplexes 24 hours a day, and on DAB in London from 7 pm to 6 am daily. Its content was chosen by members of Absolute's VIP Service, who selected songs which were then voted for, and songs with the most votes were played. dabbl has now ceased, its DAB slots outside London taken by Absolute Radio 90s.

=== Liquid ===
Liquid was a station playing indie, alternative and Britpop. It ran on DAB in London between 2000 and 2004, with its slot taken by Virgin Radio Classic Rock (now Absolute Classic Rock).

=== Virgin Radio Groove ===
A radio station on DAB, Virgin Media, Sky and the Internet which played motown, soul and disco music. Originally named The Groove, it was rebranded as a Virgin Radio station in 2004 and closed at the end of 2007.

=== Virgin Radio Party Classics ===
Launched on 15 June 2006, Virgin Radio Party Classics played party pop music. The radio station was based on Suggs' Virgin Party Classics show broadcast on Virgin Radio. The station, which broadcast on Sky Digital and online, closed on 3 October 2006.

=== Virgin Radio Viva (cancelled) ===
Virgin Radio Viva, which was due to launch on the new 4 Digital Group platform (which ultimately never launched), was due to be a popular music station aimed at 15- to 29-year-old females. It did not go ahead.

== Bibliography ==
- Evans, Chris (2009). It's not what you think. HarperCollins. ISBN 978-0-00-732723-2.
- Evans, Chris (2010). Memoirs of a Fruitcake. HarperCollins. ISBN 978-0-00-734568-7.
