= 2021 in British radio =

This is a list of events taking place in 2021 relating to radio in the United Kingdom.

== Events ==
=== January ===
- 1 January –
  - BBC Radio 3 airs the annual Vienna New Year's Concert. Because of the COVID-19 pandemic there is no live audience for the 2021 concert, but the concert is able to go ahead as the orchestra have been COVID tested on a daily basis.
  - BBC Radio 4 marks the 70th anniversary of The Archers with a series of features throughout the day.
  - United DJs, scheduled to close on New Year's Day due to financial difficulties, is able to continue broadcasting after receiving help from an unnamed backer.
- 2 January –
  - Former BBC Radio 1 presenter Dev Griffin joins Heart to present a Saturday afternoon show.
  - Cat Deeley joins BBC Radio 2 as a presenter.
  - Former KISS presenter Charlie Powell joins Capital to present weekend overnights.
  - Wally Webb presents his final programme for BBC Radio Norfolk after 40 years with the station.
- 3 January –
  - Clare Teal presents her final edition of The Swing and Big Band Show on BBC Radio 2.
  - Cambridgeshire community station Star Radio joins the Peterborough and Cambridge DAB multiplexes, enabling it to extend its terrestrial coverage.
- 4 January –
  - BBC Radio 2 makes some changes to its schedule. These include an earlier start for Vanessa Feltz's show, which now begins at 4am.
  - Queen Elizabeth II sends her best wishes to Radio 4's Woman's Hour to mark its 75th year, describing the programme as having "played a significant part in the evolving role of women" and wishing it "continued success" with its "important work".
  - The launch of YorkMix Radio.
  - Emma Barnett takes over as presenter of Woman's Hour, presenting the programme on Monday to Thursday.
  - Launch of Nation Radio UK on DAB. Presenters include Mike Read, Russ Williams, Neil Francis, Neil Fox and Dean Martin. The station is initially available in London, Scotland, North West England and on the South Coast.
  - Launch of Resort Radio, an online station targeting the UK domestic holiday market.
  - As part of a schedule shakeup, Hits Radio announces that former Kiss presenter Tom Green has joined the station to present Weekend Breakfast.
  - Bauer Media confirms that its dedicated charity network Cash for Kids raised £16.7 million to help disadvantaged children during 2020.
- 5 January – YouTube bans Talkradio for allegedly violating its rules by posting information that contradicts expert advice about the COVID-19 pandemic, but reinstates the station within hours.
- 6 January –
  - Oliver Dowden, the Secretary of State for Digital, Culture, Media and Sport, announces that Richard Sharp, former chair of the Royal Academy of Arts, is the government's preferred choice for the next Chairman of the BBC.
  - Woman's Hour presenter Emma Barnett defends herself after Kelechi Okafor, a guest booked for the show, pulled out at the last minute following comments made by Barnett. Barnett says she and her producer were discussing alleged anti-Semitic comments made by Okafor.
  - Rotherham's RB1 Radio signs Darren Spence and Bruce Edwards to present afternoons and evenings respectively.
- 7 January –
  - Adrian Chiles is confirmed as presenter of BBC Radio 5 Live's weekday mid-morning show on Thursdays and Fridays, replacing Emma Barnett.
  - BBC Local Radio launches its Make a Difference: Give A Laptop campaign to provide electronic devices to disadvantaged children during lockdown; by 28 January 17,645 devices have been donated by individuals and businesses.
- 8 January – BBC Local Radio relaunches the Make a Difference: Give a Laptop campaign to help provide laptops and smart devices for children unable to attend school during the lockdown.
- 9 January –
  - Henrie Kwushue joins Kiss to present weekend breakfast.
  - Graham Norton joins Virgin Radio to present a Saturday morning show; for the first time he is operating his own radio desk, something he had not done at Radio 2.
- 11 January –
  - Boom Radio UK, launching on 14 February, unveils its schedule and list of presenters, including Graham Dene, David Hamilton, Nicky Horne, Diana Luke, Kid Jensen and Roger Day.
  - Ofcom has found two community stations, Hitmix Radio in Newcastle-under-Lyme and Cumbernauld FM, to be in breach of their licence agreements for not recording their output. Both stations have blamed technical reasons for their audio recorders not working, something which came to light after listeners complained to Ofcom about content on the station and Ofcom requested a recording of the material.
  - The children's station Fun Kids launches eight new stations, including Fun Kids Classical, Fun Kids Party, Fun Kids Pop Hits and Fun Kids Soundtracks.
  - Online station Rubix Radio launches on DAB in Norwich and Cambridge.
  - Launch of Radio Travel News, a service providing local and national travel bulletins to radio stations for a monthly fee, and delivered half-hourly at peak times via Dropbox. A week on from its launch the service announces an expansion of its output.
- 13 January – Mica Paris joins Greatest Hits Radio to present Soul Food Songs, a three-part series looking at what makes an uplifting soul anthem and how music helps with people's physical and mental wellbeing. The series will end with a countdown of the top 200 soul food songs.
- 14 January – Test Match Special begins providing remote coverage of England's winter tour of Sri Lanka.
- 15 January –
  - Anita Rani joins BBC Radio 4's Woman's Hour to present the programme's Friday and Saturday editions.
  - BBC Radio 4 confirms Elizabeth Day and Johny Pitts as new presenters of the Open Book programme, with Day making her debut on 17 January and Pitts making his debut on 31 January. They replace Mariella Frostrup who had presented the programme since 2003.
- 17 January – A new chart show, the UK Hot40 Countdown, is launched for radio stations in the UK and internationally. The three-hour programme is presented and produced by Chris Brooks, and uses the UK Airplay Chart as provided by Radiomonitor.com.
- 18 January – Online old skool station NRG announces plans to launch on DAB in the Black Country and Shropshire.
- 19 January – Bristol-based community station BCfm announces it is providing free DAB sets to people aged 50 and over.
- 20–21 January – With the north west of England in the grip of Storm Christoph, BBC Radio Manchester remains broadcasting through the night to provide up-to-date coverage of events rather than taking the usual overnight feed from BBC Radio 5 Live.
- 21 January – Howell James is reappointed chair of Radiocentre, the body overseeing commercial radio in the UK, for another three-year term.
- 22 January – Broadcaster Leo Green announces plans to launch LGRADIO.ONLINE, an online subscription station catering for listeners who feel they are not served by popular mainstream music stations. The station will feature music from the 1950s and 1960s, as well as Motown, Jazz and Soul, and will also include archive programmes made by his father, Benny Green.
- 23 January – Andy Baird, suspended from Cool FM earlier in the month, has left the station, it is reported. Cool FM has subsequently revamped its weekend schedule.
- 24 January – Clare Teal joins Jazz FM to present a Sunday evening show dedicated to Big Band and Swing music.
- 25 January –
  - Former Smooth Radio presenter Dave Brown is hired by Nation Radio UK to present a late evening show on weeknights.
  - Ofcom clears Bauer Radio following a listener complaint over the broadcast of a phone call with a competition, three versions of which were recorded with three different presenters. The competition to win £100,000 was run on the Planet Rock, KISS and Absolute Radio networks, but the listener felt Bauer had not made the networked element of the competition clear and that it was possible for someone listening to any of the networks to win the money.
- 26 January –
  - BBC Radio Lancashire celebrates its 50th anniversary.
  - The BBC confirms it will not replace the post of director of radio and music following the departure of James Purnell as it cuts out a layer of management as part of cost-cutting measures.
- 27 January – BFBS signs up with Timbre, a service from SharpStream, to manage and broadcast its online content.
- 31 January –
  - Radio 2 counts down listeners' top 20 favourite songs from musicals during its Elaine Paige on Sunday show, with "One Day More" from Les Misérables voted as their favourite.
  - Radio 2 airs Musicals: The Greatest Show, a programme presented by Sheridan Smith that celebrates stage musicals. The programme, which will also air on BBC One in February, is part of a three-day celebration of musicals by Radio 2.
  - Colin Slade of Radio Exe presents a special programme celebrating his 50th anniversary in radio; Slade first presented on BBC Radio Medway on 31 January 1971.

=== February ===
- 1 February –
  - Broadcaster Rob Charles takes over as breakfast show presenter at online station All Oldies Radio.
  - Capital XTRA removes DJ Tiny from its schedule after allegations he was charging artists £200 to play their material on his show, something that breaches Ofcom rules. DJ Tiny subsequently apologises for "carelessly and irresponsibly [taking] advantage of [his] position".
- 2 February – Community station Erewash Sound announces it will remain on air after receiving a grant from Erewash Borough Council.
- 5 February –
  - Talksport begins its live coverage of the England cricket team's tour of India.
  - News UK hires Gordon Smart, a former presenter with Radio X to present and produce a daily TV programme provisionally titled News to Me.
- 6 February – Broadcaster and music promoter Adrian Skirrow joins Radio Caroline.
- 8 February –
  - Magic Radio begins Our Love, a week-long series celebrating multicultural relationships among its listeners.
  - Sound Radio, founded as an internet station in 2018, launches on FM in North East Wales.
  - Ofcom finds Capital XTRA Reloaded guilty of breaching regulations for playing "I Got 5 On It" by Luniz, a song deemed to contain racially offensive language, on 7 September 2020.
- 9 February –
  - Moray Firth Radio's 40th anniversary is celebrated with an evening online event staged by members of the Radio Academy's Scottish branch.
  - The RadioToday website reports that 30 community stations are to begin airing Greenborne, a 12 episode soap set in a village in the post-COVID era and starring John Altman.
- 10 February –
  - Bauer Media asks Ofcom for permission to change the 105.8FM frequency in London from Absolute Radio to Greatest Hits Radio.
  - Plans are announced to rebrand Country Hits Radio to Absolute Radio Country from May, making it the 10th station to be part of the Absolute Radio Network.
- 12 February –
  - Honeycomb Investments Ltd, a company founded by Michael Tabor of Global Investments, buys an 8.8% share in the US company iHeart Media.
  - Hope Radio 87.9fm returns to the airwaves in South Birmingham as a temporary service providing information about COVID-19, and to encourage its listeners to get vaccinated.
- 14 February –
  - John Barnes, a former presenter with BBC Radio Lancashire, joins Rossendale Radio in Lancashire to host a new Sunday morning show.
  - Pirate FM and Lincs FM begin airing The Hits Radio Network's 'UK Chart Show' from Bauer Radio, the show replacing local content on the stations.
- 15 February – Figures released for the fourth quarter of 2020 indicate BBC Sounds had 3.7 million listeners during the week of the 2020 United States presidential election, a record number of people using the service.
- 18 February –
  - A letter signed by more than 100 prominent figures, including politicians and writers, has criticised BBC Radio 4's Woman's Hour for what it describes as a "strikingly hostile" interview with Zara Mohammed, the first female leader of the Muslim Council of Britain. In response to the letter the BBC says presenter Emma Barnett raised "legitimate" issues during the programme, but says it will "reflect on the concerns raised".
  - BBC Asian Network announces it has hired 13 new presenters, each of whom will present their own Sunday programme between March 2021 and February 2022.
  - Ofcom begins awarding the first of a number of small scale DAB licenses, with five of a proposed 25 announced in the first round. A second round of licences is being postponed while the COVID-19 pandemic is ongoing.
  - A number of former Radio Victory presenters from the three eras of the Portsmouth station launch Victory Online. The service is not connected with the trademark owner, Independent Local Radio Limited, but the station uses much of the historic Radio Victory station on-air branding.
- 21 February – David Jensen joins Jazz FM to present a six-part series about his love of jazz music. The programme will also highlight his work for Parkinson's UK.
- 24 February – Bauer Media enters into an agreement to buy Communicorp, the Ireland-based company that owns brands including Today FM and Newstalk. The agreement is subject to approval from the regulator, and excludes CommuniCorp's UK radio stations which are operated under the Global name.
- 25 February – BBC Radio 1 confirms that eight of the presenters given a chance to present one-off shows over Christmas 2020 will now present a month of Early Breakfast Shows on Friday through the coming months. The eight presenters are Dean McCullough, Rakeem Omar, Danni Diston, Sam MacGregor, Darcy Kelly, Alex West, Numi Gildert and Robyn Richford.
- 27 February – BBC Music Introducing debuts "I Like This Feeling", a song recorded by 40 separate BBC Introducing artists from home, each of who contributed eight bars to the track without hearing the contributions from others.

=== March ===
- 1 March –
  - Konnect Radio launches online as the UK's first station playing both Christian and mainstream music.
  - Bauer Media creates a Happy News skill for Amazon Alexa, allowing listeners to hear the day's happy news stories from their newsroom.
- 2 March –
  - Bauer Media received Ofcom approval to network all programming between CFM and other Bauer stations in the north west.
  - Global Radio is given Ofcom approval to drop the Heart Nightly News programme from a number of stations in the network previously owned by GMG Radio. As Real Radio the stations were required to provide extended news content, but Global has successfully argued listeners do not want to hear the programme. Heart also no longer has to commit to 24-hour news. The stations concerned are Heart Scotland, Heart Wales, Heart North Wales, Heart North West, Heart North East, Heart Yorkshire and Heart Cornwall; all were previously operated under the Real Radio name apart from Heart Cornwall.
- 4 March – Research commissioned by Radiocentre indicates that 8 million adults are tuning into commercial radio while remote working during the COVID-19 pandemic.
- 5 March –
  - Former Capital presenter Anton Powers joins KISS to present Friday evening's In the Mix from 6pm, as well as a Saturday show on KISSTORY.
  - Scala Radio appoints presenter Alexis Ffrench as its inaugural Composer in Residence.
- 6 March – Chris Dinnis joins Goldmine FM to present the Saturday Breakfast Show.
- 7 March –
  - Ofcom gives Bauer Radio approval to add its newly acquired Plymouth licence to its South West Approved Area of radio stations.
  - KISS Life, a new Sunday evening programme presented by Swarzy Macaly, makes its debut on KISS. The programme features stories from listeners around the UK.
- 8 March –
  - Q Radio begins a new schedule that includes a new breakfast show presented by Declan Wilson.
  - Bauer Media agrees a deal to buy Mediatakojat Oy in Finland.
- 10 March – Chancellor Rishi Sunak, Dame Judi Dench and Health Secretary Matt Hancock join members of the public in the #ThankYouRadio campaign, launched by Radiocentre to thank commercial radio for the role it has played during the COVID-19 pandemic.
- 11 March –
  - Bauer Radio announces plans to launch Bauer Audiostream, a new digital audio advertising network for the Nordic countries.
  - BBC Global News Ltd and BBC Children's Production are to be transferred into BBC Studios from April 2022, bringing all of the BBC's international commercial operations under one roof.
- 12 March –
  - Boom Radio becomes available nationally on the Sound Digital platform.
  - Birmingham's New Style Radio is fined £2,000 by Ofcom for failing to file a financial report for 2018 on time; the report, expected in March 2019, was filed in June 2020.
- 15 March – Simon Mayo joins Greatest Hits Radio to present the drivetime show which becomes a national programme across all Greatest Hits stations, while former local drivetime presenters move to afternoons. Mayo also continues at Scala Radio with a weekend show.
- 16 March –
  - The latest Radio Content Fund for radio projects is announced; it includes funding for Greatest Brits with Jackie Brambles, a four-part series for Greatest Hits Radio and One Year Like This, a programme for Absolute Radio marking the anniversary of the first lockdown on 23 March.
  - Global Media is seeking permission to acquire a 50% share in iHeart Media, it is reported; Global currently has a 9% share of the company.
- 17 March – Following the death of Sarah Everard, Bauer stations in Scotland broadcast Women's Safety: What Can Men Do?, an hour-long programme discussing the issue of women's safety.
- 18 March –
  - Yorkshire's Dales Radio confirms it will become available on 104.9 from Easter, covering the villages of West Witton, Middleham, Wensley, Redmire, Spennithorne, Harmby and Constable Burton.
  - The BBC announces plans to relocate radio services, including BBC Radio 3, BBC Radio 6 Music and BBC Asian Network outside London.
- 19 March –
  - Former Downtown Radio presenter Robert Skates announces plans to launch R radio, an internet station for Northern Ireland, which will launch in the summer.
  - Ofcom announce plans to trial small-scale FM licences with a short radius, intended for use by premises such as businesses or hospitals.
- 22 March – The BBC has signed a four-year deal with the England and Wales Cricket Board to air cricket coverage on BBC Radio, with over 400 matches a year to be broadcast.
- 23 March – BBC Local Radio in England marks the first anniversary of its Make a Difference campaign, launched on 23 March 2020, the day the UK was first put into lockdown.
- 25 March – Ofcom gives Bauer permission to swap Absolute Radio with Greatest Hits Radio on 105.8FM in London.
- 26 March –
  - Radiocentre urges Ofcom to rethink proposals to limit external regulation of the BBC, fearing it will lead to a reduction in the quality of programming and damage commercial rivals.
  - Waitrose & Partners become the official sponsors of The Graham Norton Radio Show on Virgin Radio after signing a twelve-month deal to sponsor the commercials-free show. The first sponsored show is aired the following day.
- 28 March – Jeff Young presents his last Sunday morning show for Jazz FM, having announced the previous weekend his intention to leave the station after ten years.
- 30 March – The start of BBC Radio Stoke's breakfast show is delayed by an hour following a small fire at the studios. BBC Radio Shropshire is heard in its place for an hour until the fire brigade give staff the all clear to enter the building.
- 31 March –
  - Ofcom awards four more small-scale DAB licences to operators in Inverclyde, Winchester, Cambridge and Sheffield and Rotherham.
  - JACK Radio appoints Ed Crofts, a former producer with the Heart network, to produce breakfast shows on all of its stations.
  - Following the death of Sarah Everard, Bauer Radio streams a special panel show titled We Need to Talk About Women's Safety simultaneously across its stations at 8pm.
  - To mark the 31st anniversary of the launch of Choice FM, London's first and to date only black radio station, a blue plaque is unveiled at 16–18 Trinity Gardens, Brixton, site of its first studios.

=== April ===
- 1 April – As an April Fool prank on Radio 2, actor Lewis McLeod impersonates Jeremy Vine, appearing in place of Vine on Ken Bruce's show to preview the day's edition of The Jeremy Vine Show.
- 2 April – BBC Local Radio launches Squad Goals, a non-terrestrial service providing football updates and information that airs while local stations are providing match coverage for which they only have terrestrial broadcasting rights, and that replaces a looped message telling listeners on Freeview, BBC Sounds and smart devices they are unable to listen to live football because of rights issues.
- 3 April –
  - BBC Radio 3 begins a week of programmes celebrating the life and work of Igor Stravinsky to mark the 50th anniversary of his death.
  - Jamz Supernova and The Blessed Madonna join BBC Radio 6 Music to present weekly shows.
  - The entire presenting team of West Yorkshire Radio walks away from the station after being told it does not have a sufficient income to sustain it. The station is subsequently closed.
- 4 April –
  - As part of a weekend of programming to celebrate its Make a Difference campaign, BBC Local Radio airs the Easter address from the Archbishop of Canterbury followed by Life's Second Chances, a documentary about people who have recovered from COVID-19 and see it as a second chance at life. Other programmes in this strand will air at 9am on Good Friday (2 April), Easter Monday (5 April) and Easter Tuesday (6 April), and feature contributions from Sir Tom Jones, Beverley Knight and Little Mix congratulating those who have made a difference.
  - Jazz FM begins a new Sunday presenting line up which sees Tony Minvielle moving from a late night slot to replace Jeff Young's show, and the fulltime return of Robbie Vincent.
- 5 April –
  - Scala Radio commences its spring schedule, with former GMTV presenter Penny Smith joining the station to present the weekday drivetime programme.
  - Georgia Mann joins BBC Radio 3 to present Essential Classics.
  - Nation Radio UK replaces Mike Read with Neil Fox on its breakfast show, while Neil Francis replaces Fox on drivetime.
  - "A Whiter Shade of Pale" by Procol Harum is named the UK's number one song of all time in a Top 200 voted for by listeners of Boom Radio.
- 6 April –
  - The Zoe Ball Breakfast Show begins a new jingles package produced by Wise Buddah Productions. The company have also created new jingles for Claudia Winkleman's Saturday Show.
  - ExmouthAiR is relaunched as East Devon Radio, with former Radio Exe presenter Ben Clark joining to present the station's breakfast show.
- 9 April –
  - Regular programming on UK radio stations is suspended following the death of Prince Philip, which is announced at midday. Following the announcement stations go into "obituary mode", providing news coverage of the death (all BBC stations simulcast a special BBC News programme which is broadcast from midday until 5pm), or suspend their usual playlists in favour of sombre music.
  - Radio Clatterbridge, one of the UK's oldest hospital radio stations, celebrates its 70th anniversary with a day of special programming.
- 10 April – An edition of Radio 2's Sounds of the 60s is cancelled due to the death of Prince Philip, Duke of Edinburgh.
- 12 April –
  - Ofcom decides to take no action against Capital Xtra over one of its presenters charging to play tracks on his show.
  - Ian Skelly, who previously presented Essential Classics, becomes one of the presenters of BBC Radio 3's Afternoon Concert.
- 13 April – Ofcom confirms plans to re-tighten rules regarding the content radio stations should be broadcasting. For example, due to the COVID-19 pandemic some stations have not broadcast content such as local news and local produced programming, but they will be required to do so again from the end of September.
- 14 April – Ian Moss is appointed as CEO of Radiocentre, replacing Siobhan Kenny who leaves the post in June.
- 15 April – The BBC confirms that a further ten BBC Local Radio stations will switch off their mediumwave frequencies during May and June 2021. The stations that will no longer be available on AM are BBC Essex, BBC Radio Cambridgeshire, BBC Radio Devon, BBC Radio Leeds, BBC Radio Sheffield, BBC Hereford & Worcester, BBC Radio Stoke, BBC Radio Lancashire, BBC Radio Ulster and BBC Radio Foyle.
- 16 April – The Radio Academy appoints Sam Bailey, previously a commissioning executive at BBC Radio 1, as its new managing director, with immediate effect.
- 19 April –
  - BBC Local Radio announces the launch of its "Make a Difference – Back to Business" initiative to support England's arts sector.
  - Absolute Radio confirms that Chris Kamara will join the station's presenting team for the delayed Euro 2020; he will join regular presenters on both the breakfast and drivetime programmes.
  - Radiocentre Director of External Affairs Matt Payton is appointed to the newly created role of chief operating officer.
  - Ofcom finds Radio Caroline in breach of regulations after it played the song "French Kiss" by Lil Louis, which contains "prolonged sounds of sexual moaning" during its breakfast show on 17 December 2020, and at a time when children could be listening. In response the station says it has launched a review of its database.
  - Maritime Radio celebrates its second anniversary on air by beginning a 25-hour marathon programme at 11pm.
  - Helen Haslam, a former executive with Bauer Media, Communicorp and GMG Radio, is appointed as Business Director of RadioWorks Group.
- 20 April – BBC Radio 1 announces major changes to its schedules from September. Annie Mac will also leave the network in July, and Diplo from September.
- 22 April – BBC Radio 1 relax launches on BBC Sounds.
- 23 April –
  - Podcast Radio and TED launch a partnership that will see TED Audio Collective podcasts being aired on the station.
  - Stephanie Hirst presents her final show for BBC Radio Leeds after three years with the station.
- 24 April – David Allen announces live on air that his syndicated Saturday night music request show on BBC Local Radio is being axed from 15 May, then criticises the BBC for its decision. This programme turns out to be his final one after he is subsequently told he is not welcome to present what would have been his final three shows.
- 25 April – kmfm launches The Kent Top 40, a live Sunday afternoon chart show presented by Alex and Numi.
- 26 April –
  - Following a campaign by the UK Community Radio Network, Ofcom gives community stations permission to air split content for different parts of the areas they cover.
  - Bauer switches off its mediumwave frequencies in Lancashire, Greater Manchester, Leeds and Humberside. They are being switched off following the launch of Greatest Hits Radio on FM in those areas.
  - Edinburgh singer-songwriter Bonnie Kemplay is named as the winner of BBC Radio 1's Live Lounge Introducing talent search.
  - Newcastle stations Metro and TFM announce they are relocating their studios and offices to Gainsborough House, a Grade II listed building in the city's Grey Street.
- 28 April – Talksport announces plans to join a social media boycott by English football in response to racism in football, from 3pm on Friday 30 April until Tuesday 4 May.
- 30 April –
  - Bauer Radio confirms that former Swansea Sound breakfast show presenter Kevin Johns will not return to presenting with Bauer following his trial and acquittal on allegations of sexually abusing a teenage boy during the 1980s.
  - Lyca Media II Ltd, owners of London's Lyca Dilse Radio, file a request with Ofcom to change the station's format to a retro Asian service with lifestyle speech for the over 40s.

=== May ===
- 3 May – The results of the 2021 Global Awards are announced to listeners of Global Radio; the event is unable to take place physically because of the COVID-19 pandemic so the winners are announced on air and online.
- 4 May –
  - Bauer Radio announces plans to launch premium online subscription services to compliment Scala Radio, Jazz FM, Planet Rock and Kerrang! Radio, with an extra 20 stations available ad free and with extra content.
  - Lyca Radio refreshes its content with new presenters, focusing more on hit Bollywood music, as well as London news and events.
- 5 May –
  - Following research and feedback into BBC Sounds, Ofcom concludes the service is not having any adverse impact on its commercial competitors.
  - Ofcom awards a number of small scale DAB licences, for Cardiff, Edinburgh, Leeds and Norfolk.
  - Talksport signs Jose Mourinho, who will join the network for the duration of its coverage of the Euro 2020 contest.
  - Radio Today reports that the online business orientated and commercial free station Aspen Waite Radio has launched on DAB in Cardiff.
- 6 May – BBC Radio Ulster and BBC Radio Foyle stop broadcasting on MW.
- 10 May –
  - BBC Radio Cambridgeshire stops broadcasting on MW.
  - JACK begins a syndicated breakfast show across its stations titled JACK's Wake-Up Call and presented by Jim Rosenthal and Trevor Marshall
- 13 May – BBC Radio Hereford & Worcester stops broadcasting on MW.
- 14 May – The fourth annual "Mental Health Minute" is broadcast across BBC and commercial radio at 10.59am to mark the final day of Mental Health Awareness Week.
- 17 May –
  - BBC Radio 4's Woman's Hour is extended from 45 minutes to a full hour.
  - BBC Radio Lancashire stops broadcasting on MW.
  - Country Hits Radio rebrands as Absolute Radio Country and becomes part of the Absolute Radio Network.
  - Greatest Hits Radio replaces Absolute Radio on 105.8FM in London.
  - Bauer Radio is granted regulatory approval to purchase Communicorp, with the deal completing on 31 May.
- 18 May – "Waterloo" by ABBA is named the UK's favourite Eurovision song following an online poll by BBC Radio 2 listeners.
- 19 May – As part of its "Make a Difference Happy Heads" campaign, BBC Local Radio is to promote voluntary opportunities with local children's mental health organisations.
- 20 May –
  - BBC Essex stops broadcasting on MW.
  - For the second time in five months, internet station United DJs Radio announces plans to close.
- 23 May – Chesterfield Radio announces its closure, and ceases to broadcast from midnight.
- 24 May –
  - The BBC secures the rights to broadcast footage from the Live at Worthy Farm livestream concert held on 22 May. A behind-the-scenes documentary is also planned.
  - BBC Radio Stoke stops broadcasting on MW.
- 27 May –
  - Shelley Humphries, a mother of five who runs a burger van business, wins £1million on Heart Breakfast's "Make Me a Millionaire" competition.
  - BBC Radio Sheffield stops broadcasting on MW.
- 31 May –
  - Ken Bruce presents an edition of All Day PopMaster on BBC Radio 2.
  - BBC Radio 6 Music begins "Loud and Proud", a three-week season of programming, guest presenters and mixes celebrating LGBTQ voices.
  - Online station Regency Radio launches on DAB+ in Brighton and Hove.
  - Online station All Oldies Radio announces plans to launch on DAB in Hertfordshire, Bedfordshire and Buckinghamshire from September.

=== June ===
- 1 June –
  - Bauer Media announces the completion of its acquisition of CommuniCorp.
  - Talkradio announces it has signed Trisha Goddard to present a Saturday afternoon show, which she will present live from the United States.
  - BBC Radio Leeds stops broadcasting on MW.
  - Jazz FM announces a new six part series for Sunday nights presented by Sir Michael Parkinson in which he will share his love of jazz music.
- 6 June – Footballer David James presents a one-off programme for Scala Radio titled Football Scores with David James. The programme explores the long-standing partnership between football and classical music
- 7 June –
  - BBC Radio Gloucestershire stops broadcasting on MW to the Stow-on-the-Wold area.
  - Talkradio confirms that James Whale will return to presenting its late show, his first stint on the show having been when the station was first launched in the 1990s.
  - Greatest Hits Radio announce they have signed up Martin Kemp to present London Calling, a four part series exploring the influence London had on the music and culture of the 1970s, 1980s and 1990s; the series begins on 9 June at 7pm.
  - BBC Radio Scotland announce they have signed Biffy Clyro frontman Simon Neil to present a six part series in which he shares his love of music, starting in July.
  - Launch of the temporary station Virgin Radio Pride UK, a station aimed at the LGBTQ+ community that will be on air on DAB in London and online for four months, and have a predominantly LGBTQ+ presenter lineup.
- 9 June –
  - BBC Radio Wales stops broadcasting on MW across north-east Wales on 657 kHz MW, and on many transmitters using 882 kHz, leading only one MW transmitter, the Washford transmitting station, which covers the southern areas of Wales.
  - Launch of Care Radio, an online station aimed at the estimated nine million paid and unpaid carers in the UK. The station launches online but has plans to join DAB.
- 10 June – Doncaster-based station TX1 Radio moves onto DAB+.
- 11 June –
  - Plans are announced for GB News Radio, an audio simulcast of the television news channel GB News, to launch on Digital One in July.
  - BBC Radio 6 Music afternoon presenter Shaun Keaveny announces his intention to leave the station in September.
  - Absolute Radio launches the pop-up station Absolute Radio Noel to celebrate the release of the Noel Gallagher's High Flying Birds compilation album Back the Way We Came. The station is on air from 10am on 11 June to midnight on 18 June.
- 12 June – Simon Mayo is among those to be recognised in the 2021 Birthday Honours with an MBE for his services to broadcasting.
- 14 June – Nicky Campbell is to leave the breakfast show on BBC Radio 5 Live after almost 20 years at the helm.
- 16 June – London's Lyca Dilse Radio is granted permission from Ofcom to change its format to a retro Asian service following a consultation.
- 17 June – Bauer purchases Stockport-based Imagine FM and announces it will join the Greatest Hits Radio network.
- 21 June –
  - Jazz FM launches The Robbie Vincent Music Garden Party, a streaming channel featuring music played by Robbie Vincent on his show for the station.
  - Plans are announced for the launch of Frisk Radio, a station focusing on dance and R'n'B in the North East of England, with a provisional launch date for the autumn.
- 22 June – BBC Radio 2 announces a series of programmes celebrating the summer of 1996, including specials about the Spice Girls and Euro 96.
- 23 June – Following an agreement between the BBC and Australian media company Southern Cross Austereo, BBC content becomes available via the LiSTNR app.
- 25 June – Anna Foster announces she is to leave BBC Radio 5 Live's Drivetime show to become the BBC's new Middle East Correspondent.
- 28 June – Elise Evans takes over as presenter of the breakfast show on BBC Radio WM, replacing Daz Hale.
- 30 June –
  - BBC Radio 1's drivetime host Nick Grimshaw announces he is to leave the station after 14 years. He will be replaced as drivetime host by Vick Hope and Jordan North.
  - BBC Radio Cornwall presenter James Churchfield has to leave the breakfast show after an hour on air when he receives an alert from the NHS Test and Trace app advising him to self-isolate. The show is taken over by Naomi Kennedy during Churchfield's absence.

=== July ===
- 1 July –
  - Radio Exe takes over the contract to provide reporting for the Local Democracy Reporting Service in Devon, doing so for three years, and becoming one of 18 news organisations in the UK to report on local democracy events.
  - Retro Sound temporarily suspends its service in south Wales as a cost-saving measure until it can begin broadcasting on DAB.
- 2 July – Spandau Ballet bassist Martin Kemp joins Greatest Hits Radio to present a weekly Friday night programme entitled The Mix Tape with Martin Kemp.
- 4 July –
  - Charles Esten joins Absolute Radio Country to host a four part series playing some of his favourite country music.
  - Barrister Robert Rinder joins Classic FM to host a six part series. One of the focusses of the series will be composers who were gay.
  - Camilla Tominey joins LBC to present a weekly Sunday afternoon show that will cover issues relating to politics and the royal family.
  - Prince Charles presents Music & Memories with HRH The Prince of Wales for the Hospital Broadcasting Association. The programme highlights the role of hospital radio during the pandemic, and features some of the Prince's favourite pieces of music.
- 9 July – The Wanted singer Max George joins Hits Radio to present a Friday night show entitled Friday Night Hits.
- 14 July – BBC Local Radio announces its intention to continue with its Make a Difference campaign as COVID restrictions are lifted from 19 July.
- 17 July – Former Sky Sports News presenter Kirsty Gallacher joins Smooth Radio to present the Saturday afternoon show.
- 20 July –
  - Sue Perkins is announced as the new permanent host of BBC Radio 4's Just a Minute. The programme had been hosted by a series of guest presenters following the death of original host Nicholas Parsons in January 2020.
  - Ofcom finds London's Rinse FM in breach of the broadcasting regulations for playing "Better In Tune With The Infinite", a track by rapper Jay Electronica, without providing contextual explanation for its listeners.
- 21 July –
  - Craig Charles is announced as the new host of the weekday afternoon show on BBC Radio 6 Music, replacing Shaun Keaveny from the autumn.
  - Link FM, a Sheffield-based community station for the Pakistani and Muslim community, is found to be in breach of its licence for failing to log its output.
- 22 July –
  - Bauer announce that Bournemouth-based Fire Radio and Bristol-based Sam FM will rebrand as Hits Radio from September. Both stations will retain local drivetime shows.
  - Newsround presenter Hayley Hassall is announced as the new presenter of the Saturday and Sunday overnight programme on BBC Radio 5 Live, starting from 11 September.
- 25 July –
  - Virgin Radio announce that Stephen Mulhern will join the station to cover for Graham Norton while Norton takes a four-week break.
  - Jazz FM begins a three-part series featuring recently surfaced interviews with Oscar Peterson, Sarah Vaughan and Art Blakey. The material was recorded by journalist Les Tomkins, who died in 2020 and left his archive to the National Jazz Archive.
- 26 July – Graeme Park begins presenting the breakfast show on Manchester's Mom's Spaghetti Radio.
- 28 July –
  - BBC Radio 2 appoints Heart Breakfast producer Jordan Hemingway to become producer of The Radio 2 Breakfast Show, replacing Ricky Marshall, who is to become Programme Manager at Absolute Radio Country.
  - Lyca Media confirms its phased rebranding of Dilse Radio in favour of Lyca Gold, a station targeting over 40s, launching fully in September.
- 30 July –
  - The BBC announce that local radio stations in England will share more networked programming across the day and at weekends. The interim measure is intended to alleviate problems with staff having to self-isolate.
  - Annie Mac presents her final show for BBC Radio 1 as she leaves the station after 17 years of broadcasting.

=== August ===
- 1 August – The first DAB multiplex for the Channel Islands begins broadcasting.
- 3 August –
  - BBC Radio Devon stops broadcasting on MW.
  - Ofcom announces it will not carry out a public interest test against BBC Radio 1 Relax, saying the impact on competitors' services is likely to be low due to "significantly lower usage than predicted".
  - Ofcom agrees a power increase for Radio Caroline to increase its coverage area to include Kent and East Sussex.
- 4 August –
  - Radio X hire Noel Gallagher to present a Sunday evening programme during August.
  - Talksport apologise after a caller on the previous night's edition of The Sports Bar made an anti-Semitic comment towards Tottenham Hotspur chairman Daniel Levy. The comment had not been broadcast on the radio due to a tape delay but had been broadcast on the station's live YouTube stream.
- 5 August – To celebrate the launch of digital radio in the Channel Islands, Chris Evans presents the Virgin Radio breakfast show from Jersey.
- 6 August – Internet radio presenter Graham Hart is sentenced to 32 months imprisonment for using anti-Semitic language and racial slurs on his radio show.
- 9 August –
  - Global Radio confirms its purchase of Quidem Media, allowing it to take full control of six Midlands stations that are running under the Capital brand.
  - Bauer Media announce plans to purchase Rádio Jemné and Europa 2 in Slovakia.
- 10 August –
  - Ofcom finds Sheffield-based Islamic radio station Link FM in breach of its broadcasting regulations following the broadcast of an Islamic chant containing "Jihadi lyrics" and "promoting terrorism". The community station will face sanctions for airing the nasheed twice during 2020.
  - FM radio stations in North Yorkshire are forced off the air following a fire at Bilsdale transmitting station.
- 11 August – Capital confirms plans for the Capital Weekender, a live event over the August Bank Holiday that will include a rooftop party hosted by MistaJam and featuring Jodie Harsh, Billen Ted and 220 KID.
- 12 August –
  - Nick Grimshaw presents his last drivetime show on BBC Radio 1.
  - BBC Radio 5 Live drive presenter Anna Foster leaves the programme to take up a new role as BBC Middle East correspondent in Beirut.
  - The RNIB launches an accessible radio that can receive FM and DAB+ stations.
- 16 August –
  - John Clayton, a former presenter with Greatest Hits Radio and Heart, begins presenting a mid-morning magazine show on Christian music station Konnect Radio.
  - Former Scottish Conservative leader Ruth Davidson joins Times Radio to cover Mariella Frostrup's afternoon show for four days.
- 18 August – Capital Lancashire moves its Chorley relay from 96.3 FM to 102.8 FM.
- 20 August – Bauer announce that Imagine FM will rebrand as Greatest Hits Radio from 1 September.
- 21 August –
  - Drag queens Bimini Bon-Boulash, Lawrence Chaney and Jodie Harsh host a series of shows on BBC Radio 1 to celebrate the station's first "Drag Day".
  - Dave Brown joins Boom Radio to present a weekly Saturday night show.
- 23 August – Singer Calum Scott joins Viking FM to co-present the breakfast show with Alex Duffy for a week while usual co-presenter Ellie Brennan is away.
- 26 August –
  - Following an inquest into the death of radio presenter Lisa Shaw, Newcastle upon Tyne coroner Karen Dilks has concluded the cause of death was as a result of an extremely rare "vaccine-induced thrombotic thrombocytopenia", a condition which leads to a brain haemorrhage. Shaw died in May after becoming ill a week after receiving the first AstraZeneca COVID vaccine.
  - Hits Radio have signed Stephanie Hirst to present a weekly show on Saturday evenings.
- 27 August – The Kiss Network's KISS Does Summer Weekend August Bank Holiday weekend summer party event gets underway.
- 30 August –
  - Scout Radio is granted a limited FM licence to broadcast fulltime from Gilwell Park, the home of scouting, from September.
  - Judi Spiers makes her debut on Boom Radio.
  - Greatest Hits Radio announce plans to release Simon Mayo's Confessions as a podcast.

=== September ===
- 1 September –
  - BBC Radio 5 Live announce that Rick Edwards will join Rachel Burden to present a new look breakfast show from November.
  - Imagine FM rebrands as Greatest Hits Radio.
  - Media personalities and radio presenters are among those to criticise the BBC and singer Cheryl Cole for the BBC's choice of Cole to present You, Me and R&B, a 12-part BBC Sounds podcast, with critics suggesting a black presenter would have been better, and citing it as an example of "black talent being pushed to the side and ignored".
- 3 September – Fashion consultant Gok Wan joins Gaydio to present a Friday evening show throughout September.
- 5 September – The Radio Today website reports that the University Hospital of Wales station Radio Glamorgan has expanded to cover two additional hospitals, adding St David's Hospital and the Cardiff Royal Infirmary, where it was based when it launched in 1974.
- 6 September –
  - Vick Hope and Jordan North begin co-presenting the Radio 1 drivetime show.
  - Sue Perkins begins hosting Just a Minute on BBC Radio 4.
  - Claire Lawson temporarily takes over from Laura Crockett as co-presenter of kmfm Breakfast alongside Garry Wilson while Crockett is on maternity leave.
  - Bournemouth's Fire Radio and Bristol's Sam FM rebrand as Hits Radio.
  - Former Real Radio presenter Elisa Hilton joins Your Harrogate to present the weekday drivetime show.
  - 106 JACK FM introduces its first drivetime show as Adam English's drive show is simulcast to the station from other stations in the JACK network. The programme also begins airing on JACK2 Hits and JACK3 Chill.
- 7 September – Fran Unsworth announces she will step down from the post of BBC Director of News and Current Affairs in early 2022.
- 9 September – BBC Radio 1 confirms its Christmas Takeover initiative to showcase new presenters will return for a third year over Christmas 2021.
- 10 September – Former BBC Radio 6 Music presenter Shaun Keaveny presents his final afternoon show with the network after 14 years as a presenter on 6 Music.
- 11 September – Hayley Hassall begins hosting the overnight programme on BBC Radio 5 Live.
- 12 September –
  - BBC Radio 4 confirms plans to extend the runtime of its Front Row arts programme to 45 minutes.
  - Former Sam FM Bristol presenter Mark Franklin joins Greatest Hits Radio South Wales to present the Sunday breakfast show.
- 13 September –
  - Jeremy Kyle returns to radio, joining Talkradio to present the weekday Drivetime show.
  - Talkradio releases a one-off straight-to-TV show titled Cancel Countdown. The programme is a top ten countdown of instances of cancel culture tackled by the station.
  - BBC Radio London begins a new schedule, which includes former athlete Jeanette Kwakye joining to present the afternoon show and Eddie Nestor presenting a new mid-morning programme.
- 14 September – LBC announces the appointment of Scotsman Deputy Political Editor and Columnist Gina Davidson to the newly created role of Scotland Political Editor.
- 15 September – Following a cabinet reshuffle, Nadine Dorries is appointed Secretary of State for Digital, Culture, Media and Sport, replacing Oliver Dowden.
- 16 September – News UK announce plans to launch talkTV in early 2022, using presenters from Talkradio and other News UK media.
- 17 September –
  - Virgin Radio Pride UK stops broadcasting, but plans to return next year.
  - Listeners to Radio X are treated to breakfast at a Manchester café following a promise made by Chris Moyles on his breakfast show.
- 19 September –
  - Lancashire's Beyond Radio is presented with the prestigious Queen's Award for Voluntary Service at a ceremony in Preston.
  - Hits Radio Pride confirms that Sunday afternoon presenter Olivia James will take over weekday afternoons, succeeding Paris Munro.
- 22 September –
  - Classic FM Live broadcasts from the Royal Albert Hall for the first time since 2019. No concert had been held in 2020 due to the COVID-19 pandemic.
  - BBC Radio 5 Live travel presenter Michelle Dignan is to join BBC Radio Manchester as a breakfast show presenter from October, replacing Becky Want.
  - BBC Radio 1Xtra announces it will launch a weekly Afrobeats chart show on 26 September, presented by Eddie Kadi.
- 27 September –
  - At midday the internet station, All Oldies Radio, is launched on DAB in Hertfordshire, Bedfordshire and Buckinghamshire.
  - Northern Irish journalist Peter Cardwell is appointed political editor at Talkradio.
- 30 September –
  - BBC Asian Network presenter Yasser presents his final drivetime show for the network ahead of a schedule shakeup in October.
  - At 10am, Absolute Radio presenters Andy Bush and Richie Firth begin a live 24-hour jukebox on the network in aid of Teenage Cancer Trust.
  - Bauer launches Bond 24/7, a pop-up radio station playing music from the James Bond franchise to mark the release of No Time to Die.
  - Bauer Media Audio completes its acquisition of Slovak stations Rádio Jemné and Europa 2.

=== October ===
- 1 October – Nation Radio Scotland becomes available on DAB in the Central Belt.
- 3 October – Ben Earle of The Shires joins Absolute Radio Country to present a Sunday morning show.
- 7 October –
  - Radio 2 celebrates National Poetry Day with a series of specially commissioned poems read by its presenters, including Vanessa Feltz and Sara Cox.
  - In an exclusive for its breakfast show, Radio Bath becomes the first commercial station to play "The Tipping Point", the new single by Tears for Fears.
- 8 October – The Glasgow trial small scale DAB multiplex is closed by operator Nation Broadcasting ahead of a permanent relaunch of the multiplex in 2022.
- 11 October – Chris Tarrant presents a tribute evening to David Jensen at London's Cadogan Hall in aid of Parkinsons UK; Jensen has lived with the condition for ten years.
- 14 October – BBC Radio 2's Sounds of the 60s live show, which features music and stories of the decade, is cancelled at the last minute after a safety issue at the Margate venue where it was due to be held.
- 15 October – Heart Christmas returns to the airwaves, and will air until after Christmas.
- 16 October –
  - Radio 1's Out Out! Live, a music concert to celebrate the return of the night out, is held at the SSE Arena in Wembley, London.
  - Radio 2 celebrates National Album Day with an all-female playlist.
- 17 October –
  - Magic Radio's Magic at the Musicals event returns to the Royal Albert Hall.
  - Bauer Media airs a Coldplay concert from London's Shepherd's Bush Empire that is simulcast across 13 of its stations around Europe.
  - Yorkshire-based Jorvik Radio is found in breach of Ofcom's regulations after failing to provide a full recording of its content following a request from the regulator.
- 19 October – David Elms, Head of Media at KPMG, joins the board of Boom Radio as non-executive chairman.
- 21 October –
  - A Digital Radio and Audio Review by the Department for Digital, Culture, Media and Sport concludes there will be no switch off of the FM frequency until at least 2030. The news is welcomed by the UK's major broadcasters.
  - Classic FM presenter Bill Turnbull announces he is taking a break from his on-air role for health reasons.
  - BBC Radio confirms it has signed a four-year deal to continue broadcasting coverage of the Men's Six Nations Championship from 2022 to 2025.
  - Talksport confirms it will air the 2021 Autumn Internationals, the first time it has aired coverage of the tournament.
- 22 October – Times Radio signs Dominic O'Connell as its first business correspondent.
- 24 October – Adele Roberts, who presents Radio 1's Weekend Breakfast Show, reveals that she has been diagnosed with bowel cancer and will undergo surgery to remove a tumour.
- 25 October –
  - The All-Party Parliamentary Group on Commercial Radio publishes its The Future of Radio report which calls for an urgent plan to make sure radio remains free-to-air on smart speakers.
  - Melissa Todd, a newsreader with Thanet-based community station Academy FM, gives a revealing interview to Kent Online about her career as a dominatrix ahead of the publication of her book, My Body Is My Business. As a result of the article Todd is suspended from her role at the station, but subsequently joins Cinque Ports FM as a presenter of a late night love songs programme.
- 26 October – BBC Radio Manchester presenter Justin Moorhouse announces he has left the station after disagreements over the length of his show.
- 27 October – RAJAR publishes its first set of post-COVID audience figures following an 18-month hiatus, and the first to include Boom Radio and Times Radio listenership. These show a weekly audience for Boom of 233,000 with an average listening time of eight hours per week, and an audience for Times Radio of 837,000 per week with a weekly average of 5.5 hours. The figures also show a fall in the number of breakfast show listeners to a number of stations when compared to pre-pandemic figures, although RAJAR says this could be as a result of a change in the way it records its figures.
- 29 October – Europe's Biggest Dance Show returns to Radio 1 for the fourth time.
- 30 October – The Radio Today website reports that BBC Local Radio Political Correspondent Paul Rowley is retiring after 47 years in broadcasting.
- 31 October – A foundation named for Zetland FM presenter Julie Donaldson, who died from COVID on 31 October 2020, is launched at an event in Redcar. The foundation has been established to encourage youngsters to follow careers in arts and entertainment.

=== November ===
- 1 November –
  - Argyll FM launches its Internet radio service, the last radio station operating on a commercial licence in the UK to do so. Consequently, all commercial radio stations in the country are now available online.
  - Boom Radio begins rerunning the first series of Kenny Everett's sci-fi comedy Captain Kremmen.
- 5 November –
  - Nicky Campbell presents his final Breakfast Show on BBC Radio 5 Live.
  - The BBC confirms that former England cricket captain Michael Vaughan will not appear on his BBC Radio 5 Live show on Monday 8 November following allegations he made racist comments to a group of Asian players.
- 8 November – Rick Edwards joins Rachel Burden to present a new sound breakfast show on BBC Radio 5 Live. Edwards replaces Nicky Campbell, who moves to a new mid-morning slot.
- 9 November – Global Media & Entertainment Investments retracts its plans to take almost 50% shareholding in iHeartMedia.
- 15 November – Comedian Iain Lee launches the online station Radio Anywhere.
- 16 November –
  - At 9am, singer Sophie Ellis-Bextor embarks on her 24-hour Kitchen Disco Danceathon on Radio 2 to raise funds for Children in Need.
  - The BBC announce that Coventry will host the Radio 1 Big Weekend in 2022.
  - BBC Radio 3 and BBC Radio 4 announce the cancellation of plans to broadcast a new radio version of The Snowman after composer Howard Blake complained it would sound "silly". The music for the new version was to have been sung rather than played by instruments, with narration by Stephen Fry.
- 19 November –
  - Release of a version of Fleetwood Mac's song "Everywhere" recorded by Niall Horan and Anne-Marie for Children in Need 2021. BBC Radio 1 and BBC Radio 2 have worked with the artists to produce the single.
  - Andrew Marr is to leave the BBC after 21 years to join Global Radio, where he will present on LBC and Classic FM.
  - A small fire at the News UK building in London forces its radio stations off air briefly.
- 21 November –
  - The Absolute Radio Live comedy night returns to the London Palladium to raise money for the Teenage Cancer Trust. Presented by Frank Skinner, it features Dara Ó Briain, Joe Lycett, Judi Love, Angela Barnes, Phil Wang and Glenn Moore.
  - Magic Radio's Magic of Christmas event returns to the London Palladium, with artists including Ronan Keating, Rag'n'Bone Man and Will Young.
- 22 November – Ofcom finds community station Revolution Radio in breach of its licence for not sticking to its Key Commitments at launch, chiefly that it has not complied with commitments to music, original content and locally produced content, and is not serving its specified target community – Northampton's ethnic communities.
- 23 November – Bauer Radio confirms Free Radio Birmingham will move out of its Brindleyplace studios after 20 years to relocate to 54 Hagley Road; their lease on the Brindleyplace building comes to an end at the end of the year.
- 25 November – England footballer Raheem Sterling is confirmed as one of seven guest editors of BBC Radio 4's The Today Programme over the Christmas period.
- 26 November –
  - "In My Life" is voted the most popular song by The Beatles by listeners of Boom Radio in their Boom Beatles Chart, which was compiled to coincide with the release of Peter Jackson's documentary series The Beatles: Get Back.
  - Magic Radio switches its usual playlist to one consisting entirely of Christmas tracks.
- 27 November – Adele Roberts returns to the Radio 1 Weekend Breakfast Show following a break from the show while receiving treatment for cancer.
- 29 November –
  - The two Hits at Breakfast shows on Free Radio's Birmingham and Black Country & Shropshire are merged into one regional show across all four Free Radio licences, following the departure of Birmingham & Black Country presenter Dan Morrissey. The new show is presented by JD and Roisin. The merger is permitted under Ofcom's local content guidelines. Opt-outs are retained for local news, traffic updates and advertising.
  - A fire alarm at Broadcasting House forces BBC Radio 4 off the air for almost 15 minutes during that morning's edition of The Today Programme.
  - The first permanent small-scale DAB multiplex launches when the multiplex covering Tynemouth and South Shields begins broadcasting.

=== December ===
- 1 December –
  - Two local DAB multiplexes go on air. One covers north Cumbria and the other covers south Cumbria and North Lancashire. Both carry BBC Radio Cumbria, meaning that for the first time all BBC radio stations are now broadcasting on DAB.
  - Northern Ireland's Downtown Radio switches its usual playlist for one consisting entirely of Christmas hits.
- 5 December – Talksport marks the 100th anniversary of the date on which the Football Association told its member clubs to refuse the use of their grounds for women's football, citing the game's unsuitability for women. The event changed the course of women's football, which had been popular during the First World War.
- 6 December – Yasmin Evans is leaving BBC Radio 1Xtra after nine years.
- 10 December –
  - Durham OnAir launches on DAB Digital Radio in Tyneside and the North of County Durham.
  - Frisk Radio launches on DAB across North and South Tyneside, with Andy and Steph on air for the first breakfast show.
- 14 December – JACK Radio launches its JACK Radio Player app.
- 15 December – Nation Broadcasting have launched a DAB transmitter on the Channel island of Alderney.
- 16 December –
  - Greatest Hits Radio have signed Jackie Brambles to present the weekday evening show, replacing current presenter Darren Proctor, who leaves on 23 December.
  - Heart confirms major schedule changes from January 2022, with the addition of Yasmin Evans and Lindsay Russell to its presenter line-up.
  - Gemma Cairney is joining Scala Radio to explore the world of classical music throughout January with a series titled Take a Moment.
- 17 December – Radio Caroline increases its output on 648 MHz by 1KW to 4KW following approval from Ofcom.
- 20 December –
  - Camilla, Duchess of Cornwall is made patron of BFBS.
  - Global Media & Entertainment have acquired podcast hosting platform Captivate.
- 21 December – GB News Radio appears on the Digital One platform ahead of a planned launch of 4 January 2022. The service will be a simulcast of the GB News TV channel.
- 22 December – Boom Radio signs Bob Harris to present a Sunday evening programme from 9 January 2022.
- 25 December – Pete Murray returns to broadcasting to present a one-off show for Boom Radio on Christmas Day.
- 27 December – The United States' Federal Communications Commission gives its approval to a move by Global Media & Entertainment Investments to purchase a 14.99% stake in iHeartMedia; currently it owns 5%.

== Station debuts ==
=== Terrestrial stations ===
- 15 January – BBC Radio Wolverhampton
- 18 January –
  - BBC Radio Sunderland
  - V2 Radio
- 14 February – Boom Radio
- 15 March – Radio Southend
- 12 April – Peak Radio
- 31 May – KISS Bliss
- 7 June – Virgin Radio Pride UK
- June – More Radio Retro
- August – B Radio
- 13 September – Lyca Gold
- 7 October – Rewind Radio
- 1 December
  - Nation 60s
  - Nation Hits
- 10 December – Frisk Radio
- 14 December – Lite Radio

=== Online stations ===
- 4 January –
  - Resort Radio
  - YorkMix
- 11 January –
  - Fun Kids Classical
  - Fun Kids Animals
  - Fun Kids Silly
  - Fun Kids Party
  - Fun Kids Pop Hits
  - Fun Kids Naps
  - Fun Kids Classics
  - Fun Kids Soundtracks
- 16 January – Delux Gold
- 1 February –
  - Bucks Radio
  - Robinhud Radio
- 15 February – RAW Radio
- 1 March –
  - Konnect Radio
  - Your Harrogate Radio
- 22 March – North Derbyshire Radio
- 28 March – Great British Radio
- 22 April – BBC Radio 1 relax
- 2 May – Westway Radio
- 4 May – Retro Sound
- 17 May – Belfast 247
- 9 June – Care Radio
- 11 June – Rhubarb Smoothies Radio
- 14 June – Black Country Xtra
- July – Radio Xtra
- 2 August – Made in Kent
- 21 August – 1866 Sport
- 30 September – Bond 24/7 (a pop-up station celebrating the release of the film No Time to Die)
- 5 November – Sunshine Radio Online
- 15 November – Radio Anywhere

== Small-scale multiplex switch-ons ==
- 29 November – Tynemouth/South Shields

== Programme debuts ==
- 16 January – Tearjerker With Jorja Smith on BBC Radio 3
- 18 January – Bodies on BBC Radio 4 (2021)
- 23 January – Downtime Symphony with Celeste on BBC Radio 3
- 24 January – The Clare Teal Show on Jazz FM
- 31 January – Musicals: The Greatest Show on BBC Radio 2 (2021)
- 8 February – Our Love on Magic Radio (2021)
- 7 March –
  - KISS Life on KISS
  - Beatlejuice on Union JACK (2021)
- 30 March – The Idea of Guilt on Shine Radio (2021)
- 2 April –
  - Squad Goals on BBC Local Radio
  - Claire Sweeney Meets on BBC Radio Merseyside
- 4 April – The Definitive History of Jazz in Britain on Jazz FM (2021)
- 7 April – Life Changes on BBC Radio 4
- 25 April – My Unsung Hero (presented by Chelcee Grimes) on Talksport
- 9 May – Sunday...Late and Live with Les Gunn (syndicated)
- 10 May – JACK's Wake-Up Call on JACK
- 28 August – Stephanie Hirst's Belters on Hits Radio
- 26 September – The Official UK Afrobeats Chart Show with Eddie Kodi on BBC 1Xtra.
- 3 October – Union JACK Dance Grooves with Jon Jules on Union JACK Dance
- 17 October – The Cabinet of Jazz on Jazz FM
- 7 November – Brothers Osborne on Absolute Radio Country
- 4 December – The Vinyl Countdown on K107
- 25 December – Romesh Ranganathan: For The Love of Hip Hop on BBC Radio 2

== Returning this year after a break of one year or longer ==
- Eurovision Song Contest (1956–2019, 2021–present)

== Continuing radio programmes ==
=== 1940s ===
- Desert Island Discs (1942–Present)
- Woman's Hour (1946–Present)
- A Book at Bedtime (1949–Present)

=== 1950s ===
- The Archers (1950–Present)
- The Today Programme (1957–Present)

=== 1960s ===
- Farming Today (1960–Present)
- In Touch (1961–Present)
- The World at One (1965–Present)
- The Official Chart (1967–Present)
- Just a Minute (1967–Present)
- The Living World (1968–Present)

=== 1970s ===
- PM (1970–Present)
- Start the Week (1970–Present)
- You and Yours (1970–Present)
- I'm Sorry I Haven't a Clue (1972–Present)
- Good Morning Scotland (1973–Present)
- Newsbeat (1973–Present)
- File on 4 (1977–Present)
- Money Box (1977–Present)
- The News Quiz (1977–Present)
- Feedback (1979–Present)
- The Food Programme (1979–Present)
- Science in Action (1979–Present)

=== 1980s ===
- Steve Wright in the Afternoon (1981–1993, 1999–2022)
- In Business (1983–Present)
- Sounds of the 60s (1983–Present)
- Loose Ends (1986–Present)

=== 1990s ===
- The Moral Maze (1990–Present)
- Essential Selection (1991–Present)
- Night Waves (1992–Present)
- Essential Mix (1993–Present)
- Up All Night (1994–Present)
- Wake Up to Money (1994–Present)
- Private Passions (1995–Present)
- In Our Time (1998–Present)
- Material World (1998–Present)
- Scott Mills (1998–2022)
- The Now Show (1998–Present)

=== 2000s ===
- BBC Radio 2 Folk Awards (2000–Present)
- Big John @ Breakfast (2000–Present)
- Sounds of the 70s (2000–2008, 2009–Present)
- Dead Ringers (2000–2007, 2014–Present)
- Kermode and Mayo's Film Review (2001–Present)
- A Kist o Wurds (2002–Present)
- Fighting Talk (2003–Present)
- Jeremy Vine (2003–Present)
- The Chris Moyles Show (2004–2012, 2015–Present)
- Annie Mac (2004–2021)
- Elaine Paige on Sunday (2004–Present)
- The Bottom Line (2006–Present)
- The Christian O'Connell Breakfast Show (2006–Present)
- The Unbelievable Truth (2006–Present)
- Radcliffe & Maconie (2007–Present)
- The Media Show (2008–Present)
- Newsjack (2009–Present)
- Paul O'Grady on the Wireless (2009–2022)

=== 2010s ===
- The Third Degree (2011–Present)
- BBC Radio 1's Dance Anthems (2012–Present)
- Sounds of the 80s (2013–Present)
- Question Time Extra Time (2013–Present)
- The Show What You Wrote (2013–Present)
- Friday Sports Panel (2014–Present)
- Stumped (2015–Present)
- You, Me and the Big C (2018–present)
- Radio 1's Party Anthems (2019–present)

=== 2020s ===
- Frank Skinner's Poetry Podcast (2020–Present)
- Newscast (2020–Present)
- Sounds of the 90s (2020–present)

== Ending this year ==
- 14 April – The Isolation Tapes (2020)
- 24 April – David Allen (2000s–2021)
- 30 July – Annie Mac (2004–2021)

== Closing this year ==
Date	Station	Launched
3 April	West Yorkshire Radio	2020
23 May	Chesterfield Radio	2020
27 May	HG1 Radio	2020
30 June	Retro Sound	2021
8 October	Bond 24/7	2021

== Deaths ==
- 30 January – Mike James, 62, broadcaster (Dee Radio)
- February – Terry Mills, 38, presenter (ExmouthAIR)
- 10 February – Fred Marden, 55, radio presenter, producer, executive, and lecturer
- 14 February – Iain Pattinson, 68, comedy scriptwriter
- c.17 February – Christopher Lee, 79, BBC News correspondent, historian and radio documentary writer
- 7 March – Alastair Alexander, 83, radio and television football commentator (BBC Radio Scotland)
- 1 April – Gary Scott, 57, travel reporter
- 6 April – Duncan Wallace, producer (Galaxy, Beats 1)
- May – Ian Polmear, 54, broadcaster and journalist (BBC Radio Cornwall, Pirate FM)
- 21 May –
  - Lisa Shaw, 44, journalist and radio presenter (BBC Radio Newcastle, Metro Radio, Heart North East)
  - Tony Lyman, 65, broadcaster (Radio Trent, Leicester Sound, GEM, Century 106, Saga, Smooth Radio, BBC Radio Derby)
- 10 June – Dominic Busby, 53, sports presenter (BBC Radio 5 Live)
- 9 July – Jono Coleman, 65: broadcaster (Virgin Radio)
- 15 August – Terry Smith, 87, founder of Radio City and chairman of Independent Radio News
- 23 July – Piers Plowright, 83, BBC radio documentary producer
- 31 August – Robbie Dale, 81, disc jockey (chief disc jockey at Radio Caroline and founder of Sunshine Radio)
- c.3 September – Patrick Lunt, 73, broadcaster (BBC Radio 2, BFBS Radio).
- 16 September – Eddie Austin, broadcaster and founder of Channel Radio
- 22 September – Magi Dodd, 44, producer and presenter (BBC Radio Cymru)
- 13 October – Frances Line, 81, broadcasting executive, controller of BBC Radio 2 (1990–1996).
- 22 November – Steve Rawlings, 57, presenter (Erewash Sound)
- 24 December – Simon Bolton, presenter (Zetland FM)
- 25 December – Janice Long, 66, presenter (BBC Radio 1, BBC Radio 2, BBC Radio 6 Music, BBC Radio Wales, Greatest Hits Radio)

== See also ==
- 2021 in the United Kingdom
- 2021 in British music
- 2021 in British television
- List of British films of 2021
