= Don Durbridge =

British broadcaster

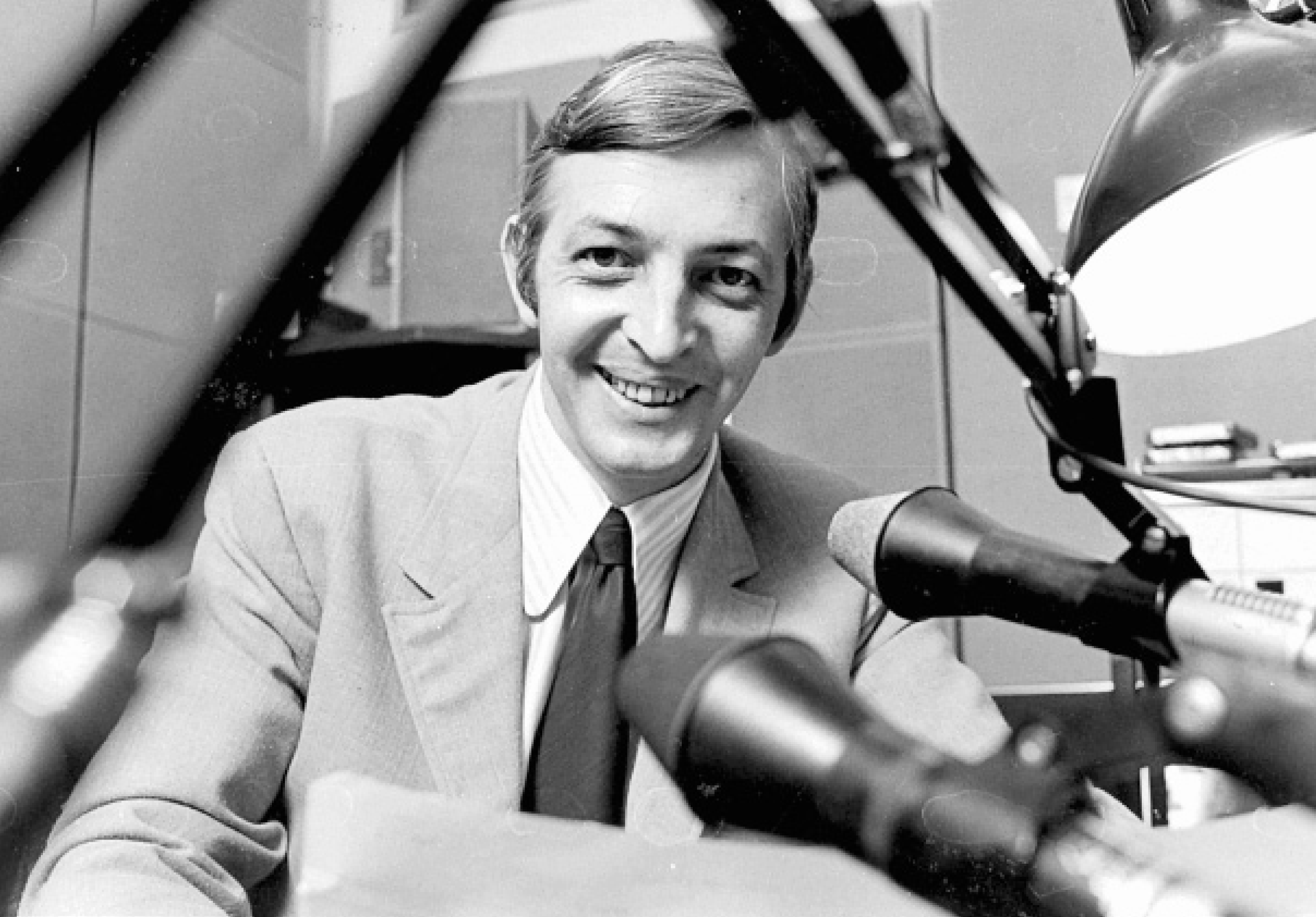
- Born: Don Durbridge; 13 January 1939; Glasgow, Lanarkshire, Scotland, UK
- Died: 9 June 2012 (aged 73); Estepona, Andalusia, Spain
- Occupation: Broadcaster

Don Durbridge (13 January 1939 – 9 June 2012) was a UK radio presenter who started his career on the BBC Light Programme, and subsequently worked on the British Forces Broadcasting Service, and on BBC Radio 2. He also broadcast for many years on BBC Radio Medway, BBC Radio Kent and Invicta Sound in Kent, and latterly on PrimeTime and Saga DAB radio. On PrimeTime he introduced the late night slot, In Mellow Mood, until the station's demise in 2006. He was also the regular matchday announcer for Fulham Football Club in the mid-1970s and for Gillingham Football Club during the 1980s.

== Early years ==
Durbridge's father served in the British Army during the Second World War and died in a Japanese prisoner of war camp in 1945. His family moved to England soon afterwards. When the young Don arrived in London as a six-year-old, he had a broad Glaswegian accent.

Durbridge was educated at the Henry Thornton Grammar School in Clapham, South London, from 1950 until 1955. His first job was with the Jack Hylton Entertainment Organisation and he also worked on various local newspapers in London before becoming a junior reporter for the Sunday Citizen. A keen sportsman in his younger days, he was London table tennis champion for two years and also enjoyed boxing, cycling, running, and water polo.

== First broadcasts ==
Durbridge first broadcast to the nation in 1955 at the age of sixteen as co-host of The Younger Generation on the BBC Light Programme having answered an ad in the Radio Times. He contributed to the network for several years before being called up for national service. On his return in 1962, he married his longtime sweetheart Yvonne, whom he had known for eight years.

In 1966, he signed up with the British Forces Broadcasting Service (BFBS), where his encyclopaedic knowledge of sport kept him in demand as a broadcast anchor and commentator for international boxing and football matches. It also took him across the globe including to Aden (now Yemen) in 1966/67, to Cologne in Germany (1968–69 and again for part of '72) and then to Gibraltar for three years.

In 1972, Durbridge was assigned as a BFBS reporter for the Munich Olympics, where he secured a worldwide scoop – an exclusive interview with the swimmer Mark Spitz, who'd won an – unprecedented at the time – seven gold medals at the Games.

Durbridge was also press officer and matchday announcer for Fulham F.C. in the mid-1970s when George Best and Bobby Moore were in the team.

== BBC Radio 2 ==
Durbridge returned to the BBC in 1974, joining the Light Programme's successor Radio 2 as a continuity announcer and newsreader, his first BBC staff job. He soon became a regular cover presenter, hosting such iconic shows as Two-Way Family Favourites, Friday Night is Music Night, Saturday Night with the BBC Radio Orchestra, Night Ride, Band Parade, Music Through Midnight and Sport on 2, and was also a regular cover presenter for Terry Wogan, Jimmy Young, Ed Stewart, David Hamilton, Charlie Chester and John Dunn.

== Work in Kent ==
Durbridge joined Radio Medway in 1979 and was with the station when it relaunched as BBC Radio Kent in July 1983.

In October 1984, he was part of the launch team for Kent's very first commercial radio station, Invicta Sound (now Heart South), where he hosted a mid morning music and chat programme. Invicta Sound's 'debate and discussion' launch format was famously unsuccessful and most of the early presenters found themselves out of work when the schedule was revamped less than a year later.

Durbridge returned to BBC Radio Kent for the rest of the '80s and early '90s as presenter of the popular nostalgia music show, Remember When, and also hosted the Sunday morning breakfast shows which included his popular topical chats with Canon Clifford Pollard (deceased), who was Director of Education for the Diocese of Canterbury at the time. Always a crowd puller, Durbridge hosted a series of stage shows for the BBC at the Kent County Show and was one of the main anchors of BBC Radio Kent's marathon six-hour live fund-raising Children in Need broadcasts, as well as being match day announcer at Gillingham F.C. for most of the '80s.

== Digital age ==
Durbridge pursued his broadcasting career in Malta in the early '90s where he also married his second wife Cheryl, returning to Britain, to the county of Kent, in 1997. It was from there that he relaunched his UK broadcasting career, tossing out the gramophone decks and needles to embrace the digital broadcasting age, and was soon back behind the microphone at Channel Travel Radio in Folkestone giving out cross channel information to motorists on the M20.

A stint as weekend newsreader for London talk station LBC followed before he joined the new over fifties digital service PrimeTime Radio where he presented the late night slot, In Mellow Mood. He also presented shows for Primetime's digital sister station, Saga DAB radio, as well as Saga 106.6 FM in the East Midlands and Saga 105.7 FM in the West Midlands, all of which were recorded in Saga Digital's west London studios.

When Primetime and Saga ceased broadcasting in 2006, Durbridge emigrated to Estepona on the Costa del Sol in southern Spain. His final radio stop was with REM FM (now Talk Radio Europe), where, from May 2007, he presented weekend shows with a mix of music, chat, and celebrity guests as diverse as the entertainer Max Bygraves and the jazz loving politician Ken Clarke.

== Death ==
Durbridge died in Spain on 9 June 2012. He was survived by his first wife, Yvonne, and also left a daughter, Moira, and a grandson, Teddy.
