= Durbridge =

Durbridge is a surname. Notable people with the surname include:

- Don Durbridge (1939–2012), radio presenter
- Francis Durbridge (1912–1998), English playwright and author
- Luke Durbridge (born 1991), Australian road and track cyclist
