= Saga 105.7 FM =

Former radio station in Birmingham, UK

SAGA 105.7fm (defunct)
- West Midlands and Warwickshire; England
- Broadcast area: West Midlands
- Frequency: 105.7 MHz DAB:12A

Programming
- Format: Oldies

Ownership
- Owner: GMG Radio

History
- First air date: 16 October 2001
- Last air date: 23 March 2007

Saga 105.7fm was an Independent Local Radio station broadcasting to the West Midlands of the United Kingdom. As well as the West Midlands County, it also served surrounding areas such as Worcestershire, Staffordshire, and Warwickshire.

Part of the Saga Radio Group, the station broadcast its programmes from its studios on the Hagley Road in Birmingham. Saga 105.7 FM was available locally on the FM frequency, as well as through DAB digital radio and online via a streaming service.

== Programming ==
Programming was a quality service aimed at an audience over the age of 50, with familiar, melodic music covering most genres from the 1940s up to the present day. There were also special interest shows on genres such as Country and Western, Jazz, Big Band music and Rock and Roll. These included:

- Swing Time with Sheila Tracy – featuring big band and dance band music;
- Dinner at Eight – classical music;
- The Collection – hits from the 1940s, 1950s and 1960s;
- 50s/60s Saturday – Saturday morning programme playing music from the 1950s and 1960s;
- 60s/70s Sunday – Sunday afternoon show featuring music from the 1960s and 1970s;
- Saga Country – the very best in country and western music;
- Saga Silver Screen – music from the movies;
- Soul Train – Soul and Motown hits.
- Smooth Jazz – jazz music
- Pure Nostalgia – music from the 1930s through to the early 1950s;
- David Hamilton's Million Sellers – the songs that sold a million;
- Jukebox Giants – music from the Rock'n'Roll era.

== Notable presenters and personnel ==
Notable presenters who hosted shows for the station included Les Ross (who made his name locally with a long running breakfast show on BRMB), David Hamilton, Tony Brandon, Roger Day, Bev Bevan, and Sheila Tracy. Also (Jeff Harris), (John McKenzie), (Mike Baker), (Mike Hollis), (Mick Wright) and (Mike Wyer) who presented the first breakfast show on the re branded Smooth on 26 March 2007)

== Rebranding ==
Following GMG Radio's purchase of the Saga Radio Group in December 2006, it was announced that from March 2007, all Saga stations were to be rebranded as Smooth Radio. Saga 105.7 FM closed shortly after 6pm on Friday 23 March 2007 and was followed by a preview weekend for its replacement. 105.7 Smooth Radio was launched at 6am on Monday 26 March 2007.

== See also ==
- Saga 105.2 FM
- Saga 106.6 FM
