= Night Ride (BBC Radio 2) =

Night Ride is a long-running overnight radio programme that was heard for many years on BBC Radio 2. It first went on air in 1967, and was revived as part of a schedule overhaul in January 1984 when it was heard daily from 1am to 3am. In January 1991 it was extended to start at 12.35am, and by the middle of the decade it had become a three-hour programme, beginning at 12.05am.

Many different presenters hosted the programme over the years, with two presenters at any one time – one during the week, and the other hosting the programme on Friday-to-Sunday nights. Each presented the programme for a couple of months. One of the longest-standing hosts of the programme was Bill Rennells who presented the programme on an ad hoc basis for almost a decade.
