= PrimeTime Radio =

British radio station

PrimeTime Radio was a national UK radio station. Launched in 2000, it was part of Saga Radio Group until it became independent in 2004. It operated as a sister station to Saga Digital radio. The line up featured a variety of presenters including David Hamilton, Don Durbridge, David Allan, Dave Cash, Gavin McCoy, Tony Myatt and Sheila Tracy (who had been the main proponent of big band music on BBC Radio 2). Music played on the station was melodic from the previous six decades. PrimeTime used jingles ("easily the best") that were reminiscent of those common in the mid-1960s (for example on the offshore Britain Radio).

PrimeTime radio won an award for Best Digital Terrestrial Station at the 2004 Sony Radio Awards ceremony.

The Chairman of PrimeTime Radio, Roger De Haan announced in November 2005 that he was withdrawing PrimeTime Radio from DAB digital radio from May 2006 when its multiplex licence with Digital One ended. It continued on Sky channel 0132, NTL channel 871 and online at primetimeradio.org (and on DAB in Greater London and Northern Ireland) for a few weeks, carrying repeats of previous programming, before being withdrawn from these services on 2 June 2006.

== New Zealand ==
The music format at PrimeTime Radio in the UK inspired the establishment (by different people) of a low-power FM and internet station in the Bay of Islands in New Zealand. Primetime Radio 1ZZ offered a broadly similar format to its British predecessor, along with repeats of classic US drama and serials and evening programmes of jazz and blues. This format was more common among New Zealand broadcasters than others.

== See also ==
- Boom Radio, a later station aimed at the baby boomer generation
