= Saga DAB radio =

Digital radio station in the UK

Saga DAB radio (Saga Radio London Ltd) was a UK digital DAB radio station, supported by Saga Radio Group. The line up featured a variety of presenters including David Hamilton, Don Durbridge, David Allan, Jenny Hanley, Bill Rennells and Tony Myatt. Music played on the station was easy and melodic from the previous six decades. Presenters and some station resources were shared with PrimeTime Radio.

Saga Radio (digital) won Best Digital Terrestrial Station at the 2003 Sony Radio Awards ceremony.

The station's owner, Roger De Haan, sold Saga Radio back to the Saga group of companies in 2006, and the station went off-air. In the London area, it was briefly replaced by an automated sustaining service before going off air completely at the end of 2006. Its place was taken on the digital multiplex by theJazz, a new jazz-based radio station in 2007, which went off air itself in 2008.

== Sources ==
- Heasman, Jon (24 May 2003). "BBC Radio 4 takes top Sonys" (PDF). Music & Media. Vol. 21, no. 22. London: VNU Business Media. p. 5.
- "Sony Radio Awards 2003: Winners". BBC. London: BBC News. 8 May 2003.
