= Saga 105.2 FM, Glasgow =

Former local radio station in Scotland

SAGA 105.2fm (defunct)
- Scotland
- Broadcast area: Glasgow
- Frequency: 105.2 MHz

Programming
- Format: Oldies

Ownership
- Owner: GMG Radio

History
- First air date: 7 September 2004
- Last air date: 23 March 2007

Saga 105.2 FM was an Independent Local Radio station in Glasgow, Scotland, part of the Saga Radio Group. and went on air in September 2004.

From December 2005 it was also broadcast in the East of Scotland on DAB, serving Edinburgh, Fife and the Lothians. It was the last radio station to be licensed by the Radio Authority before it became part of Ofcom.

The station was tailored for the over-50s and presenters included ex-Radio Clyde DJ Dave Marshall, as well as Bryce Curdy, Angus Simpson and Art Sutter.

At its peak it had a reach of 229,000 in September 2006 and a market share of 7.30% in September 2005. Its first year figures were ahead of the expectations of managing director Norman Quirk.

Following GMG Radio buying Saga Radio in December 2006, it was announced that Saga 105.2 FM was to be rebranded as Smooth Radio from March 2007. This was a brand name being used by GMG for its soul stations in London and the North-West of England and would also be adopted by Saga's sister stations in the Midlands.

On 23 March 2007 the last voice to be heard on the station was that of Angus Simpson who thanked the listeners and played the last record "Bringing on Back the Good Times" by Love Affair, the same song that launched the station three years previously. Immediately following at 6pm was the "Smooth Preview Weekend" giving listeners a taste of the music to come on the frequency. The official launch of Smooth Radio took place at 6 am on Monday 26 March 2007 with new breakfast presenter, ex-Radio Clyde DJ John McCauley.

== See also ==
- Saga 105.7 FM West Midlands
- Saga 106.6 FM East Midlands
