= Smooth East Midlands =

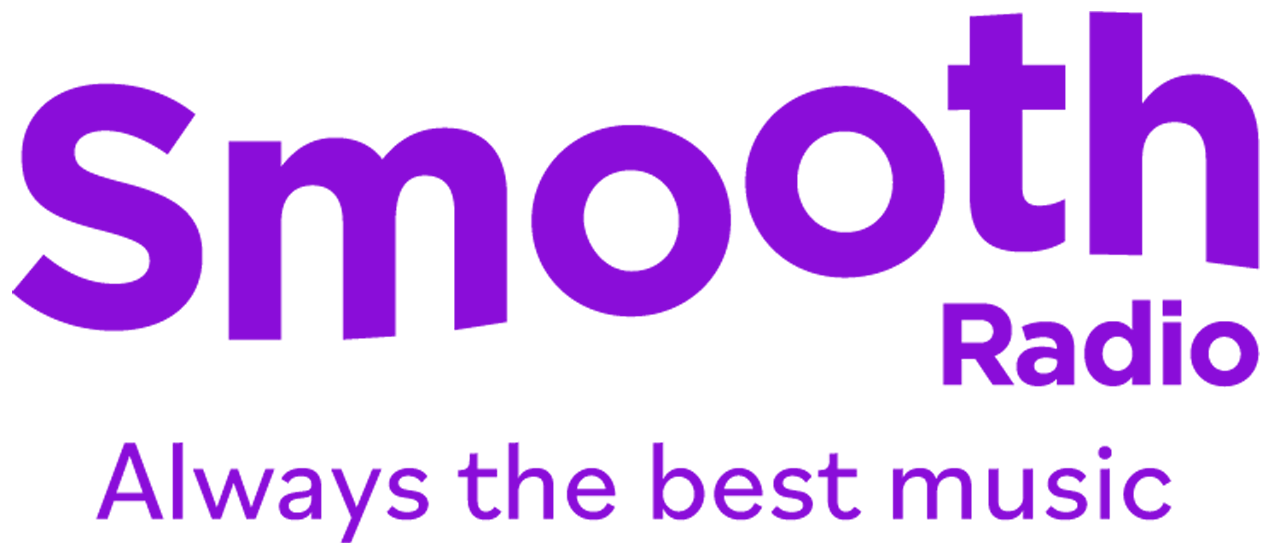
- Nottingham; England
- Broadcast area: East Midlands
- Frequencies: FM: 97.2 (Wellingborough); FM: 101.4 (Derby); FM: 106.6 (East Midlands); FM: 106.8 (Peterborough); FM: 107.4 (Kettering); DAB: 10B (Derby); DAB: 11B (Leicester); DAB: 12C (Nottingham); DAB: 12D (Peterborough)
- RDS: Smooth
- Branding: Always The Best Music for the East Midlands

Programming
- Format: Soft Adult Contemporary
- Network: Smooth Radio

Ownership
- Owner: Communicorp UK
- Operator: Global
- Sister stations: Capital East Midlands

History
- First air date: 26 March 2007

Links
- Website: Smooth East Midlands

Smooth East Midlands is an Independent Regional Radio station for the East Midlands, 107.4 MHz, 97.2 MHz, 106.8 MHz, and 106.6 MHz, which replaced Saga 106.6 FM at 6 am on Monday 26 March 2007. It is owned by Communicorp UK and operated by Global as part of the Smooth network of stations. Connect FM closed and merged with Smooth East Midlands on 1 October 2019 in Kettering, Corby, Wellingborough, Northampton, Peterborough and Rushden.

As well as being carried on FM in the East Midlands, the station could also be found on DAB digital radio and online. It was also broadcast on the NOW Derbyshire - Kettering, Corby, Wellingborough Northampton Peterborough, and Rushden DAB Multiplex.

== History ==
The station came into existence following GMG Radio's purchase of the Saga Radio Group in December 2006, and the granting of permission from the regulator Ofcom to change the format of its Smooth FM stations. The decision was made to change both the Smooth FM and Saga stations to Smooth Radio. Saga 106.6 FM closed at 6 pm on Friday 23 March 2007, and was followed by a preview weekend for the new Smooth Radio.

Smooth network of stations. Connect FM closed and merged with Smooth East Midlands on 1 October 2019. in Kettering, Corby, Wellingborough Northampton Peterborough, and Rushden

Smooth East Midlands played middle-of-the-road, adult contemporary music, aimed at listeners aged 45 and over. It had very few similarities to its predecessor. Though many of the presenters who worked on Saga 106.6 FM initially hosted shows on 106.6 Smooth Radio, many later departed and by the time of its closure none of the specialist shows from the Saga days had survived. Moreover, Smooth's initial slogan Your Life, Your Music, which was used on Saga stations, was modified to Love Life, Love Music, which continues to be used by the station's successor. The station gradually networked many of its programmes since 2007, and from 28 June 2010 Tony Lyman was the only remaining original presenter from the Saga line up.

Local programming originated from studios in Nottinghamshire. Networked programming was syndicated from Smooth North West studios at Salford Quays, Manchester.

In 2010 GMG announced that it would be merging its five Smooth stations in England to create a nationwide Smooth Radio service based in Manchester. The new station was launched on 4 October 2010 and could be heard both on DAB and locally on the FM frequencies.

=== Global Radio franchisee under Communicorp ownership ===
Smooth Radio's output was relocated to new owner Global's Leicester Square headquarters on 1 October 2013, a move that coincided with a major overhaul of its schedule, and the closure of Smooth 70s after 21 months on air.

Global reached an agreement to sell Smooth East Midlands and seven others to Communicorp, as part of a plan to allay competition fears following Global's purchase of GMG Radio. - On 4 February 2014, the Radio Today website reported that Ofcom had given Global permission to remove Smooth from the Digital One platform, and to replace it with a service playing music from the 1970s, 80s and 90s. Under this agreement, Smooth would continue to broadcast on its regional frequencies, but would be required to provide seven hours of local output per day.

On 2 March 2014 a new slogan Your Relaxing Music Mix was introduced.

In September 2019, following OFCOM's decision to relax local content obligations from commercial radio, Smooth's local Drivetime and weekend shows were replaced by network programming from London. Local news bulletins, traffic updates and advertising were retained, alongside the station's East Midlands breakfast show.

On 1 October 2019, Connect Radio 97.2, 106.8 & 107.4 closed and merged with Smooth East Midlands.

== Programming ==
As of 22 February 2025, programming is broadcast and produced from Global's London headquarters, or studios in Birmingham and Manchester.

=== News ===
Global's Newsroom broadcasts hourly regional news bulletins from 6 am-7 pm on weekdays and 6 am-12 pm at weekends. The bulletins are produced for Communicorp by Global's Nottingham newsroom.

National news updates air hourly from Global's London headquarters at all other times.
