= ATS Euromaster =

British affiliate of the European tyre service provider Euromaster

ATS Euromaster Ltd.
- Company type: Subsidiary
- Industry: Tyre Retailing; Vehicle Servicing
- Founded: 1965; 61 years ago in Birmingham, England
- Headquarters: Aston, United Kingdom
- Number of locations: 0 (2026)
- Key people: Nick Harley (Managing Director)
- Products: Tyres; MOT Test; Vehicle Servicing; Exhausts; Batteries; Shock Absorbers
- Revenue: £165,000,000 (2023)
- Net income: -£30,000,000 (2003)
- Parent: Michelin
- Subsidiaries: Tructyre
- Website: www.atseuromaster.co.uk

ATS Euromaster Ltd. is the British affiliate of the European tyre service provider Euromaster, which is a subsidiary of the tyre manufacturer Michelin. ATS Euromaster was established in 1965, and has a network of service centres throughout the United Kingdom.

At its peak, the company had around 525 service centres, this was sometime in the nineties and since then it has continued to close non profitable service centres with a view to reopen at more strategic locations.

Euromaster made a structured wind down of its UK ATS Euromaster operation and ceased operations on 01 May 2026 after 60 years.

== Operations ==
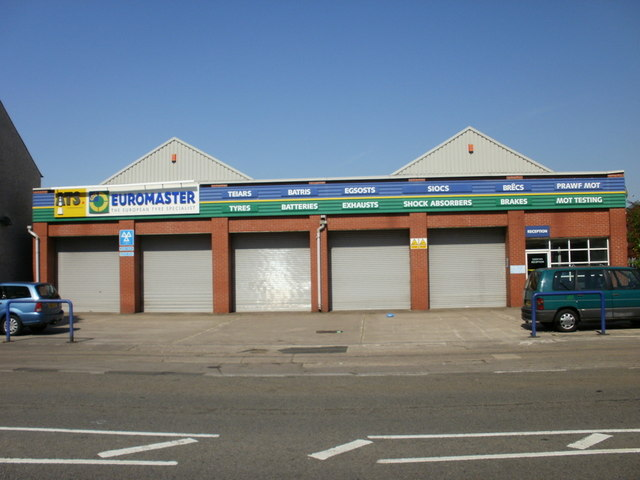
ATS Euromaster in Wales (August 2009)

ATS operates a number of centres equipped for both car and van MOTs and servicing.
