= Smooth West Midlands =

British radio station

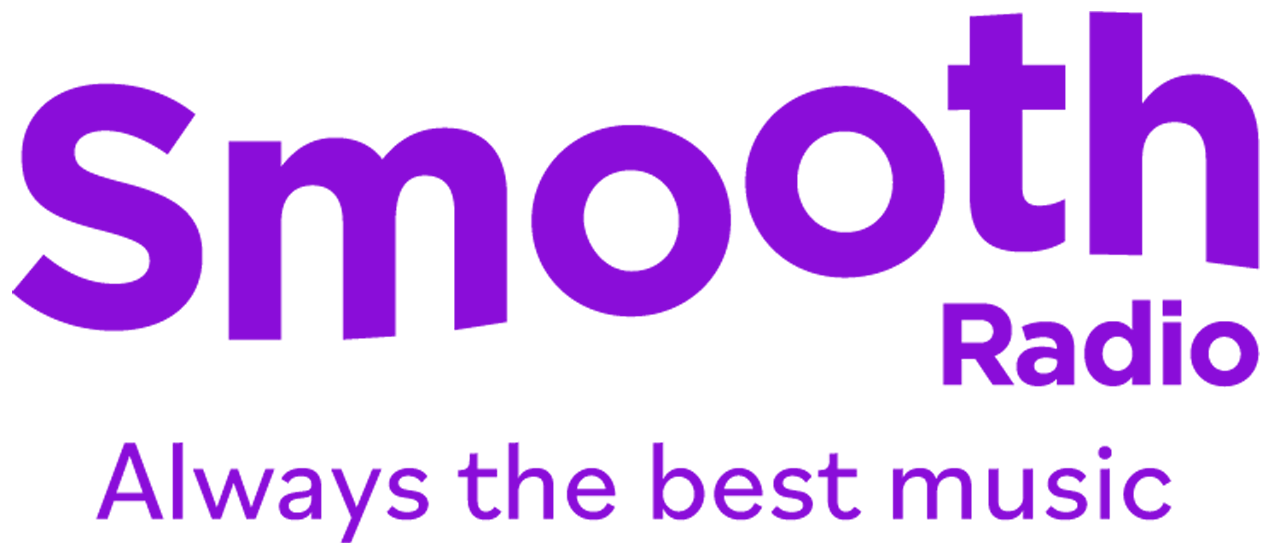
- Birmingham; England
- Broadcast area: West Midlands
- Frequencies: FM: 105.7 MHz; DAB: 11B (Wolverhampton & Shropshire); DAB: 11C (Birmingham); DAB: 12D (Coventry)
- RDS: Smooth
- Branding: Always The Best Music for the West Midlands

Programming
- Format: Soft Adult Contemporary
- Network: Smooth Radio

Ownership
- Owner: Global
- Sister stations: Capital Midlands; Heart West Midlands

History
- First air date: 26 March 2007

Links
- Website: Smooth

Smooth West Midlands is an Independent Local Radio station for the Birmingham and the West Midlands. It is owned and operated by Global as part of the Smooth network.

== History ==
=== GMG Radio ===
The station launched following GMG Radio's purchase of the Saga Radio Group in December 2006, and granting of permission from the regulator Ofcom to change the format of its Smooth FM stations in London and the North West. The decision was made to change both the Smooth FM and Saga stations to Smooth Radio and so Saga 105.7 FM was closed at 6pm on Friday 23 March 2007. This was then followed by a preview weekend for the new Smooth Radio giving listeners the chance to hear the presenters and music which would be on the new station.

Local programming originated from studios in Birmingham. Networked programming was syndicated from sister station Smooth North West at Salford Quays, Manchester.

In 2010, it was announced that it would be merging its five Smooth stations in England to create a nationwide Smooth Radio service based in Manchester. The new station was launched on 4 October 2010 and could be heard both on DAB and on the locally on the FM frequencies.

=== Global ===
Smooth Radio's output was relocated to new owner Global's Leicester Square headquarters from 1 October 2013, a move that coincided with a major overhaul of its schedule, and the closure of Smooth 70s after 21 months on air.

On 4 February 2014, the Radio Today website reported that Ofcom had given Global permission to remove Smooth from the Digital One platform, and to replace it with a service playing music from the 1970s, 80s and 90s. Under this agreement, Smooth would continue to broadcast on its regional frequencies, but would be required to provide seven hours of local output per day.

In September 2019, following OFCOM's decision to relax local content obligations from commercial radio, Smooth's local Drivetime and weekend shows were replaced by network programming from London. Local news bulletins, traffic updates and advertising were retained, alongside the station's West Midlands breakfast show.

On 24 February 2025 a fully networked schedule of programming across all Smooth Radio stations in England was reinstated, with the London-based breakfast show hosted by Jenni Falconer rolled out to the stations in place of local/regional morning programmes; split localised news and advertising were retained. Smooth West Midlands' breakfast presenter at the time, Nigel Freshman, was retained by Global to host a weekday breakfast show for digital station Smooth 80s; Freshman had been providing a voicetracked morning show for the 80s station since its launch in 2024, initially alongside his duties on the Midlands FM service.

== Station format ==
Smooth West Midlands plays middle-of-the-road, adult contemporary music, aimed at listeners aged 35 and over. It had few similarities to its predecessor. Some of the specialist shows from the Saga days survived initially, but were gradually replaced with a more contemporary format.

Smooth's initial slogan Your Life, Your Music, which was used on Saga stations, was modified to Love Life, Love Music to enhance Smooth's promise to play the best choice of music from the previous four decades. The music policy at Smooth ranged from the late '60s right up to the present date, with a heavy focus on easy listening songs. On 1 March 2014, a new slogan Your Relaxing Music Mix was introduced. This was replaced by a new tagline, Always the Best Music, as part of a wider Smooth brand refreshment in January 2023.

== Programming ==
As of 22 February 2025, programming is broadcast and produced from Global's London headquarters, or studios in Birmingham and Manchester.

=== News ===
Global's Newsroom broadcasts hourly regional news bulletins from 6 am – 7 pm on weekdays and 6 am – 4pm on weekends. The Birmingham newsroom also produces bulletins for Capital Midlands and Heart West Midlands.

National news updates air hourly from Global's London headquarters at all other times.
