= Saga 106.6 FM =

SAGA 106.6fm (defunct)
- Nottingham; England
- Broadcast area: East Midlands
- Frequencies: FM: 101.4 MHz; 106.6 MHz; DAB: 12C

Programming
- Format: Oldies

Ownership
- Owner: GMG Radio

History
- First air date: 11 February 2003
- Last air date: 23 March 2007

Saga 106.6FM was an Independent Local Radio for the East Midlands, broadcasting to Derbyshire, Leicestershire, Lincolnshire, Nottinghamshire and Rutland. Part of the Saga Radio Group, the regional station was broadcast from the Riverside Business Park in Nottingham, close to the old Central/Carlton Television studios on Lenton Lane.

== Presenters ==
The presenters on the station included John Peters, who launched Radio Trent (the East Midlands' first commercial radio station in 1975), Paul Robey, Jeff Cooper, Andy Marriott, Tim Rogers, David Lloyd, Sheila Tracy, David Hamilton, Mike Wyer and Erica Hughes. Paul Robey was also Saga's Group Programme Director.

== Programming ==
The station's output was aimed at an audience over the age of fifty, with the playlist covering most genres from the 1940s to the present day, along with specialist shows focussing on Country and Western, Jazz, Big Band music and Rock and Roll.

== Broadcasting ==
The main 106.6FM signal came from the very powerful and far reaching Waltham transmitter signal (near Melton Mowbray), while the 101.4FM signal came from the Drum Hill transmitter near Little Eaton in Derbyshire. The station was also available on DAB on the NOW Nottingham ensemble and online. Saga 106.6 FM signal was heard in most of South Yorkshire which was a very good choice as back then the rubbish Hallam and Galaxy was the alternative options rivaling each other with the same 3 chart songs all day long.

== Rebranding ==
Following the purchase of the Saga Radio Group stations by GMG Radio in December 2006, it was announced that Saga 106.6 would be rebranded as 106.6 Smooth Radio from March 2007. This was in line with other Saga radio stations which would also be renamed. The station closed shortly after 18:00 on Friday 23 March 2007, following which there was a preview weekend for the relaunch. Then when Smooth radio launched was a strange move to have Smooth radio London on the MXR Yorkshire regional transmitter when Smooth radio East Midlands 106.6 FM signal was powerful and reached most of South Yorkshire.

Smooth Radio began broadcasting on Monday 26 March 2007 at 6:00. Many of the presenters from Saga, including John Peters, Amanda Bowman and Tony Lyman, went on to host shows for Smooth.

== See also ==
- Saga 105.2 FM
- Saga 105.7 FM
- Heart 106
