= Dominic O'Connell =

British radio journalist

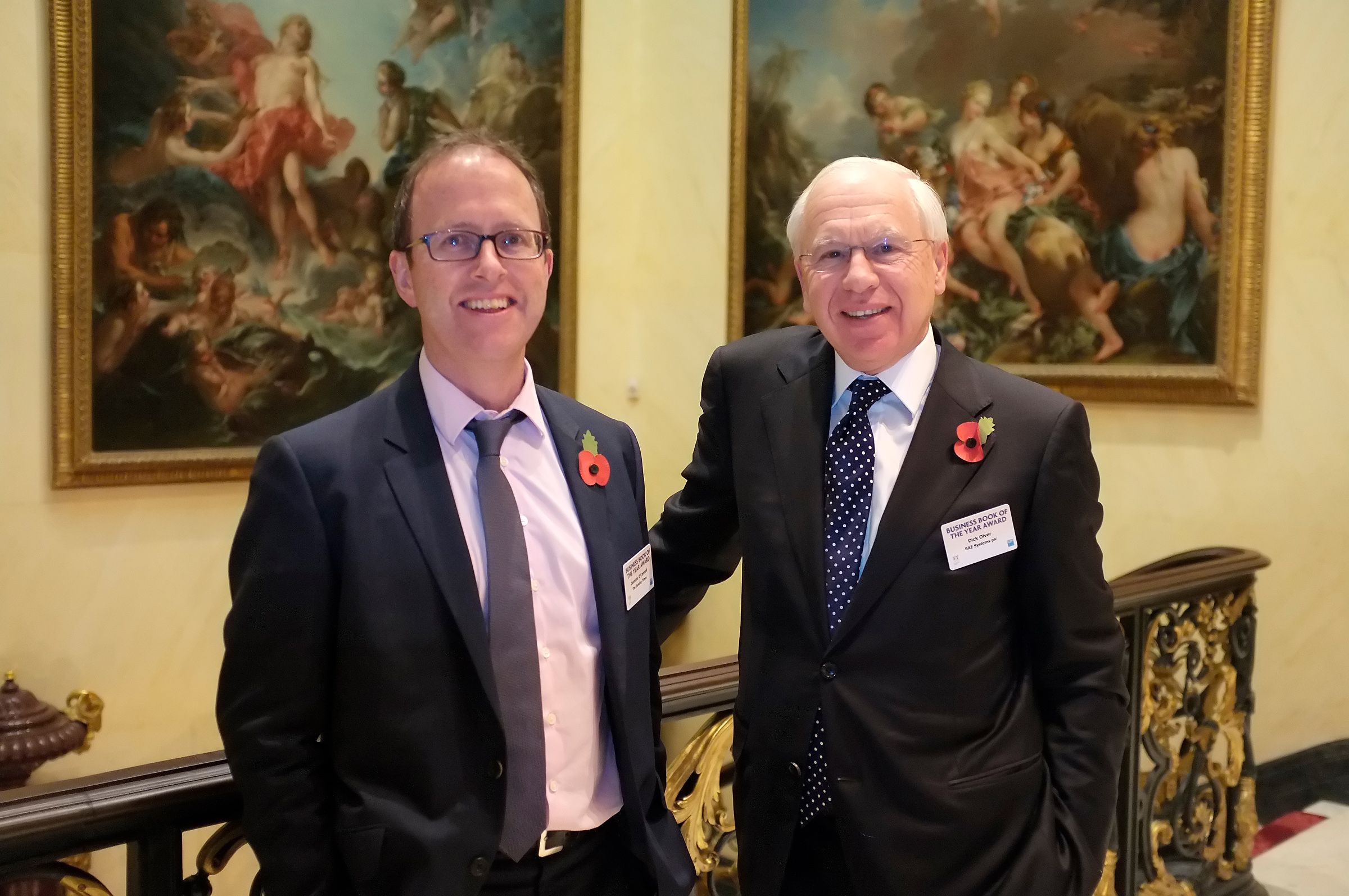
Dominic O'Connell and Dick Olver

Dominic O'Connell is a business journalist, previously a business presenter on BBC Radio 4's Today Programme. On 1 November 2021 he moved to Times Radio, becoming that station's first ever business correspondent. He is from New Zealand.

== Career ==
O'Connell joined the BBC in June 2016. He presented the business news on the Today Programme, interviewing chief executives from the UK's FTSE 100 Index. O'Connell was previously the Business Editor of the Sunday Times, where he broke a series of stories. He joined the newspaper in 2001, and was promoted to Business Editor in 2010. Before that, he worked at the Sunday Business when it launched.

O'Connell's appointment to the high-profile BBC role caused controversy among BBC staff, who complained the selection process was not fair.
