= Magi Dodd =

Welsh radio presenter and producer (1977–2021)

- Born: Magi Dodd; 8 March 1977; Pontypridd, Wales
- Died: 22 September 2021 (aged 44)
- Presenting career
- Station: BBC Radio Cymru

Magi Dodd was a Welsh radio presenter and producer, best known for her work at BBC Radio Cymru.

== Career ==
As a presenter, Dodd was a familiar voice on Radio Cymru's nightly youth strand, C2, initially as a contributor and a voiceover, before becoming one of its main presenters, hosting the flagship 8-10pm slot on weeknights. She was regularly heard presenting alongside former Big Brother contestant Glyn Wise.

Dodd went onto host her own hour-long nightly show, Dodd Com, streamed exclusively on the C2 website with a midnight repeat on Radio Cymru.

In later years, Dodd concentrated her work on producing shows for the Welsh language radio network, such as Bore Cothi, the Radio Cymru 2 breakfast show and the award-winning Llais y Maes, as part of live coverage of the National Eisteddfod.

Dodd continued to co-present Radio Cymru's annual pop quiz for Welsh-medium schools and led a series of radio production workshops for students as part of the station's schools tours. She also provided radio commentary for the Cân i Gymru song contest.

== Personal life ==
Originally from Pontypridd, Dodd attended Ysgol Gyfun Rhydfelen (now Ysgol Garth Olwg) in Rhydyfelin and studied at Aberystwyth University.

She later lived in the Grangetown area of Cardiff.

In a 2009 interview with the quarterly music magazine Y Selar, Dodd explained she grew up in a bilingual home, where her mother listened to Welsh music. She described listening to Welsh rock bands such as Jess and Beganifs in the 1990s as a real eyeopener.

On 22 September 2021, the BBC announced Dodd had died, at the age of 44.

Radio Cymru's managing editor, Dafydd Meredydd - who was one of Dodd's co-presenters on C2 - described her as full of energy, enthusiasm, creative ideas and such an important part of the team for over 20 years.
