= East Devon Radio =

Coordinates: 50.6288°N 3.3831°W

DevonAir Radio
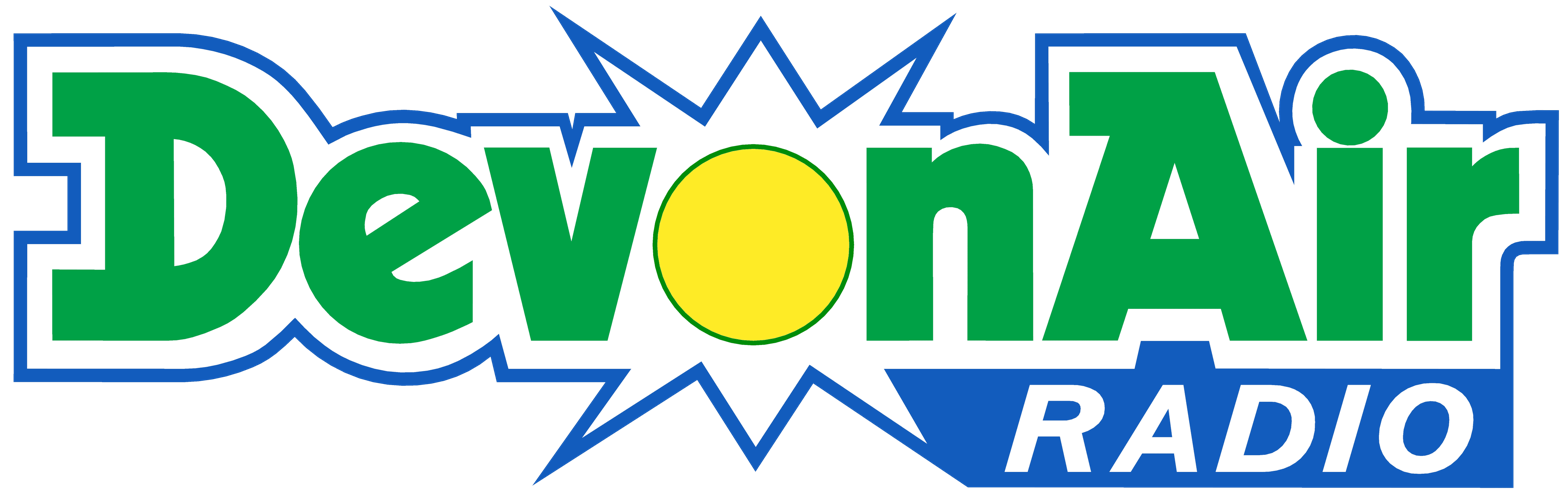
- Exmouth; England
- Broadcast area: Devon, United Kingdom
- Frequencies: FM: 106.4 MHz (Exmouth); 95.0 MHz (Sidmouth); 94.6 MHz (Exeter, Aylesbeare, Cranbrook & Sowton) FM: 106.1 MHz (Ottery St Mary); DAB+ broadcasting Exeter & Torbay
- Branding: The Heart & Soul of Devon

Programming
- Language: English
- Format: Local Radio, Chat

Ownership
- Owner: Mr Andy Green, Mrs Julie Green

History
- First air date: 11 September 2006
- Former names: Bay FM; ExmouthAiR; East Devon Radio
- Former frequencies: 107.9MHz FM

Links
- Website: DevonAir Radio

DevonAir Radio is a community radio station, based in Exmouth, Devon, United Kingdom.

== History ==
The station was launched on 11 September 2006 as Bay FM Radio with a month-long trial FM broadcast, followed by a continuing series of annual trial FM broadcasts in the Exmouth area, coinciding with the Exmouth festival.

On 12 June 2010, Bay FM began a regular weekend online service. This was increased to cover all weekday evenings. The station’s online reach is worldwide. For the week 10–18 September 2011, the station's online coverage was extended with full daytime and evening shows. The extended coverage coincided with the Tour of Britain, the fifth stage of which finished in Exmouth on Thursday 15 September.

In April 2012, Bay FM were given the news by OFCOM that their application for a full-time community FM licence had been successful. The station was launched full-time at mid-day on 29 March 2013 on 106.4 MHz FM. The coverage of the station now included a wider area. including Budleigh Salterton, Otterton, Woodbury, Exminster, Kenton, Dawlish and Lympstone. The station also reaches Exeter on 94.6 FM, Sidmouth and the Sid Valley on 95.0 FM. During this time, on 4 June 2018 the station was rebranded as ExmouthAiR.

On April 6, 2021, the station re-branded as East Devon Radio due to its expansion into Sidmouth and later into Ottery Saint Mary on 106.1 and relaunched with a new professional breakfast show host, Ben Clark, known for his presenting work across other local stations, most notably Gemini FM (now Heart West). In March 2023 the station rebranded as DevonAir Radio due to its extended coverage into Torbay and Exeter on DAB+.

== The station ==
DevonAir Radio's daytime schedule comprises music from the 1960s–today, plus community issues. Specialised music programmes (evenings from 6pm) include: '70s nostalgia, rock, soul, disco, Motown, Northern soul, funk, 1960s. The station also features music by local artists and bands, occasionally broadcasting live acts on air in The Gig Guide (a show focusing on local artists, bands and comedians) which was launched in August 2010.

== FM service ==
Bay FM started broadcasting on Monday 11 September 2006. This was a 28-day trial broadcast on 107 MHz FM. Since then, there have been five annual 14-day trial broadcasts and one seven-day trial broadcast on a pilot Restricted Service Licence (RSL), issued by the regulator, the Office of Communication (Ofcom).

Bay FM's trial broadcasts:

2006: Monday 11 September – Sunday 8 October on 107 MHz FM

2007: Monday 14 May – Sunday 28 May on 107 MHz FM

2008: Monday 19 May – Sunday 1 June on 107.9 MHz FM

2009: Monday 18 May – Sunday 31 May on 107.9 MHz FM

2010: Monday 24 May – Sunday 6 June on 107.9 MHz FM

2010: Saturday 18 December – Friday 24 December on 107.9 MHz FM

2011: Saturday 21 May – Friday 3 June on 107.9 MHz FM

2012: Monday 28 May – Friday 8 June on 107.9 MHz FM

Bay FM's Full Time Launch:

2013: Launched Mid-day Friday 29 March on 106.4 MHz FM

== Five-year licence application ==
In 2006, Bay FM applied to Ofcom for a full five-year Community Radio licence, but was unsuccessful. On 21 April 2010, Ofcom requested potential applicants to submit "expressions of interest" in its third round of community radio licensing. Bay FM submitted an "expression of interest", followed by a completed application.

On Thursday 5 April, Ofcom released the news that it had awarded 11 new community radio licences. The news was given to Station Manager Andy Green on Tuesday 3rd at 15:54. Andy Green was quoted in the press as saying "We are all completely over the moon" and expressed his thanks to everybody involved in the project past and present.

Bay FM was launched on 29 March 2013 and is now broadcasting on 106.4 MHz FM, 24 hours a day, 7 days a week.

== New studios ==
In January 2010, Bay FM moved into new studios on the outskirts of Exmouth. The facilities include two studios.

The new studios were ready in time for the station’s 2010 two-week FM trial. British TV and radio presenter and personality Gloria Hunniford visited the station on Monday 24 May 2010. Hunniford toured the new studios and was interviewed on air. "Somebody said you've got to come to this fab new station," she said. "I think it's amazing that you've put this together so quickly, so I wish you well."

== Online service ==
DevonAir Radio also has an online service. The station’s online reach is worldwide, with listener feedback from around the UK, Europe and America. The schedule comprises Bay FM's regular daytime mixture of 1960s–80s pop music and community issues, plus specialist music programming in the evenings. On 4 June 2018 the station re-branded as ExmouthAiR Radio and on April 6, 2021 re-branded for a third time as East Devon Radio.

== Funding ==
DevonAir Radio’s current funding is a mixture of grants, private donations and website advertising revenue from local businesses. In 2006, Bay FM’s first trial broadcast cost £5,000. This sum – and the cost of the 2007 broadcast (£3,000) – was funded by Andy Green and Julie Green. In 2008, Bay FM received a £400 grant from Exmouth Town Council and £500 from the Town Management. These grants, together with advertising revenue and donations, paid for that year’s broadcast. On 1 June 2009, Bay FM approached the Town Council for further financial support. The funding met difficulties, but was resolved when the Town Council agreed a £500 grant for the station. Donations and advertising revenue from the 2010 FM trial broadcast and online service helped to pay for the most recent RSL licence (around £3,000), the cost of the new studio build and general running costs. Other funding comes from Bay FM's own volunteers via fundraising events. Chris Tees, one of the presenters, hosted a 49-hour show, which raised over £900 for the station.

Registered as: East Devon Radio Radio: Limited By Guarantee: Not For Profit.

Founders: Mr Andy Green, Mrs Julie Green. Directors: (Chair) Andy Green, Julie Green, David Matthews, Christopher Collman.
