= Jorvik Radio =

Radio station in York, England

Coordinates: 53.964°N 1.047°W

- York; England
- Frequency: 94.8 MHz
- RDS: Jorvik

Programming
- Format: Hot AC

Ownership
- Owner: Jorvik Radio Ltd

History
- First air date: 4 November 2019

Technical information
- Power: 100 watts

Links
- Website: jorvikradio.com

Jorvik Radio is a community radio station based in the city of York, in North Yorkshire. The studios are located in Burnholme, York. It takes its name from Jorvik, the historical Viking name for York.

The station launched at 07:00 on 4 November 2019; the first song played on air was Shed Seven's 'Disco Down'.

== Programming ==
As a community radio service, Jorvik Radio originates all of its own programming.

According to the station's "Key Commitments" statement, it is required to broadcast information that covers community sports, the arts, commerce, current affairs, diversity, and faith.

== Transmission ==
The station broadcasts via FM on a frequency of 94.8 MHz with an ERP of 100 watts, DAB+ and online. Its transmitter site is located on a residential building to the west of the city centre.

== Notable presenters ==
- Luke Castle (Weekday Breakfast Presenter)
- Nick Love (Weekday Mornings Presenter)
- Gemma-Louise Keane (Weekday Afternoons and Weekend Breakfast Presenter)
- Sam McGuigan (Weekday Drive Time Presenter)
- Michael Jamson (Weekday Evenings Presenter)
