= Neil Francis (broadcaster) =

British freelance radio presenter

Neil Francis is a British freelance radio presenter, currently hosting afternoon drive on London DAB station, Thames Radio, and previously presented programmes on Absolute Radio, Absolute 80s, Capital FM, Gold, Chiltern Radio and BBC Radio Kent.

== Broadcasting career ==
Starting on local London pirate station Skyline Radio, Francis's first big break in radio came in 1985 with a stint on North Sea pirate Radio Caroline and he has also worked as a presenter for Chiltern Radio in Herts/Beds/Bucks, Invicta FM in Kent and Capital FM in London.

In his Virgin Radio stint, Francis presented at various time slots.

After Virgin re-branded to Absolute Radio he began to present a Friday night show called Absolute 80's and a Saturday morning breakfast show.

Francis covered the Gold Network's Drive Time show on 25 August 2010. His last regular weekly show on the network was Saturday afternoons from 1-3pm.

During February 2011 he covered Steve Ladner on BBC Radio Kent's lunchtime show.

In April 2013, Gold Network suspended Francis for comments he had posted on Facebook about the comedian Jim Davidson.

In June 2016 he began hosting the weekday Drivetime slot on London's DAB station, Thames Radio.

In January 2020 he began hosting the weekday afternoon show 1-4pm on London's DAB station, Nation Radio UK.
