= Care Radio =

British radio station

Care Radio is a British radio station established in 2021 to support the estimated nine million carers living in the UK. The station is targeted at people including healthcare workers, care home workers and at-home carers. The station is run by a non-profit Community Interest Company. It was launched as an online station in June 2021, and as a response to the COVID-19 pandemic which had put many carers under added pressure. The station content features a mix of music, interviews and listeners' stories. It has since been added to DAB in London and parts of the South East of England, and became available on DAB in Manchester in May 2022.

On 28 February 2022 the owners of Care Radio launched an online sister station, Sentimental Radio, a nostalgia and easy listening service.
