= Bill Rennells =

British broadcaster (born 1931)

- Born: William Rennells; 25 July 1931 (age 95); Canterbury, England
- Occupation: Radio broadcaster
- Years active: 1950s-present

William Rennells (born 25 July 1931) is an English broadcaster and former journalist, who presented Harmony Night on BBC Radio Oxford, Kent and Berkshire until 2023. Rennells previously hosted the late-night programme Nightride on BBC Radio 2 for 14 years.

Born in Canterbury, Rennells spent 25 years working as a journalist for various newspapers throughout the south of England, these included the Kentish Gazette, Eastbourne Gazette and Oxford Mail. In 1970 he joined the newly formed BBC Radio Oxford as a news producer and then became a freelance presenter on Radio Nottingham.

In November 1978 Rennells joined the national broadcaster BBC Radio 2 as presenter of the Thursday edition of the graveyard slot, he also co-hosted the Monday night programme Music from the Movies. In 1980 he began presenting both the Sunday and Thursday graveyard programmes. In February 1984 he took over the early morning programme and occasionally deputised for Ray Moore on the early breakfast show. In November 1984 he began presenting the late-night programme Nightride, which he presented until June 1993. He left Radio 2 soon after, however he did continue to present specialist programmes for the station until 1995.

Rennells became one of the founding presenters of Saga Radio in 2004, where he presented a mid-morning programme. In 2011 he returned to BBC Radio Oxford, where he stayed until 2023. For 13 years he presented the Sunday late night programme Harmony Night which was also simulcast on BBC Radio Kent and BBC Radio Berkshire.

Rennells presented his final Harmony Night show on New Year's Eve 2023, after the show was axed due to local radio budget cuts. Rennells later revealed his Harmony Night programme is looking for a new home to broadcast on.
