= Saga Radio Group =

Defunct British radio broadcaster

The Saga Radio Group was a British radio network owned and operated by Saga Services Ltd, and aimed at an audience aged 50 and over. The first Saga station was launched in the West Midlands on 16 October 2001 and was subsequently followed by two others based in the East Midlands and Glasgow. The network won a fourth licence for the north east in 2006, but was sold in December of that year to Guardian Media Group, which decided to re-launch Saga along with its Smooth FM stations as Smooth Radio. All Saga stations were closed on Friday 23 March 2007, and Smooth Radio was launched the following Monday.

Stations in the Saga network;

- Saga 105.7 FM – serving the West Midlands
- Saga 106.6 FM – serving the East Midlands
- Saga 105.2 FM – serving Glasgow
- Saga DAB radio – a digital based radio station

== See also ==
- PrimeTime Radio
