= Sheila Tracy =

British trombonist and broadcaster (1934–2014)

Sheila Tracy (10 January 1934 – 30 September 2014) was a British broadcaster, writer, musician and singer. She began her career as a trombone player during the 1950s, in all-female bands.

== Biography ==
Tracy was born as Sheila Lugg, on 10 January 1934, in Mullion, Cornwall in 1934. She attended Truro High School for Girls and studied piano, violin and trombone at the Royal Academy of Music, then was a member of the Ivy Benson All Girls Band between 1956 and 1958. Subsequently, she formed a vocal/trombone duo, The Tracy Sisters, who appeared in variety, on radio and television, as well as in cabaret all over the world. When the act broke up, she joined BBC Television as an announcer and worked mostly in television until 1974 when she became the first female newsreader on BBC Radio 4 on 16 July. She also qualified as a Special Policewoman in London.

On BBC Radio 2 Tracy devised and presented the Truckers' Hour, based on a format she had learnt about on a visit to the United States. She was one of the Announcers on Just a Minute.

Two of the books Tracy wrote are Bands, Booze & Broads (1995), a collection of her interviews with the American sidemen who played with the top bands in the 1930s, 1940s and 1950s; and Talking Swing (1997), on British musicians of the same era. She became a popular lecturer on P&O Cruises and wrote two other reference works.

In 1997, Tracy was given the Freedom of the City of London and became an Associate of the Royal Academy of Music. She was a former president of the British Trombone Society.

== Personal life and death ==
Tracy was married to actor John Arnatt from 1962 until his death in 1999. The couple had one son, born in 1965.

Tracy died at the age of 80, on 30 September 2014, at the Princess Alice Hospice in Esher, Surrey.

== Selected publications ==
- Who’s Who on Radio. Worlds and Work, 1983. ISBN 9780437176004
- Who’s Who in Popular Music: The British Music Scene. Worlds and Work, 1984. ISBN 9780437176011
- Bands, Booze And Broads. Edinburgh: Mainstream Publishing, 1984. ISBN 1-85158-850-7
- Talking Swing: British Big Bands. Edinburgh: Mainstream Publishing, 1997. ISBN 978-1851-5896-30
