= David Hamilton (broadcaster) =

British radio & TV presenter (born 1938)

- Hamilton in 2009
- Born: David Pilditch; 10 September 1938 (age 88); Manchester, England
- Other name: Diddy David Hamilton
- Occupations: Radio and television broadcaster
- Years active: 1959–present
- Website: Official website

David Hamilton (born David Pilditch; 10 September 1938) is an English radio and television presenter.

Since his broadcasting career began in 1959, Hamilton has hosted over 12,000 radio shows and more than 1,000 television shows. He is often known as 'Diddy David Hamilton', a name given to him by the comedian Ken Dodd.

== Early life ==
Hamilton was born in Manchester and attended Glastonbury Road Grammar School at St Helier in Surrey until the age of 17. While at school he became a columnist on the weekly national magazine Soccer Star. He performed national service in the Royal Air Force from 1959.

== Television career ==
On leaving school, Hamilton became a script-writer for the TV series Portrait of a Star.

Following his national service, he became an in-vision television announcer for ABC Weekend TV based in Didsbury, Manchester, and appeared with close friend Ken Dodd in the TV series Doddy's Music Box, acquiring the nickname 'Diddy'. Throughout the 1960s, he hosted shows for the ITV franchises Tyne Tees, Anglia and Westward.

When ABC closed down in 1968, he transferred to its successor company Thames Television as an announcer, subsequently hosting many shows for them including Miss TV Times, TV Times Gala Awards, The World Disco Dance Championships, as well as many outside broadcasts, circus and sports shows. He appeared alongside comedians Benny Hill and Tommy Cooper and hosted Thames TV's showcase weeks on television in New York City and Los Angeles. Later he hosted ATV's Saturday night series Up For the Cup, and four series of TVS's hangman-style game show All Clued Up.

For BBC TV, he hosted Top of the Pops and Seaside Special and the Eurovision Song Contest Previews in 1986. For seven years, he was the main host of one of the earliest satellite TV stations, Lifestyle. Hamilton was one of the final people on the network when it closed on 24 January 1993, appearing on the final segment wishing viewers goodbye.

== Radio career ==
=== BBC Radio ===
Hamilton made his broadcasting debut with the British Forces Network in Cologne in Germany during his national service in 1959. His first UK broadcast was as the host of The Beat Show from the Playhouse Theatre, Manchester, in 1962. He hosted the show on the BBC Light Programme until 1965. He presented the final edition of Housewives' Choice in 1967 and was first heard on BBC Radio 1 in November 1967, presenting Family Choice. By the late 1960s, Hamilton was presenting many shows for BBC radio, including Music Through Midnight, Roundabout, Pop Inn, Radio 1 Club and shows featuring the music of Frank Chacksfield.

In 1970, Hamilton joined the team of Late Night Extra and in 1973 was offered his own daily show on Radio 1 every weekday afternoon from 2 pm to 5 pm. In 1975, the show was simultaneously broadcast on Radio 1 and Radio 2 (listeners being able to hear the show in stereophonic sound on Radio 2's VHF frequency), giving it the largest British audience of the day. In November 1977, the show moved to Radio 2 and he remained with the station until he quit at the end of 1986, stating that the music policy had become Geriatric, as the then head of music Frances Line had decided to change the music policy to reflect that of the old Light Programme.

=== Commercial radio ===
Since January 1987, Hamilton has been heard on many commercial stations in the UK. He joined Reading's Radio 210 initially to present a mid-morning show from 9 am to 12 noon, although the show was quickly brought forward an hour, starting at 8 am. In November 1988 he joined Capital Gold to present its daily 10 am to 1 pm show. In addition to that, he also presented a weekly oldies show which was heard on various ILR stations around the UK. This was usually heard on a Sunday afternoon.

Starting in late 1994, Hamilton presented the Breakfast show on Melody FM (now Magic 105.4) for four years before moving to London's Liberty Radio to present an afternoon show. He also did a show on the Classic Gold Network on a Sunday.

In 2000, he joined PrimeTime Radio, presenting the weekday mid-morning show, where he remained until its demise in 2006. In October 2001, he left Classic Gold and presented the breakfast show on Birmingham's Saga 105.7 FM before moving to Nottingham's Saga 106.6 FM in early 2003. From 2004 to 2006, he was heard on radio stations around the UK, presenting his Million Sellers show, which would usually go out on a Saturday lunchtime, and was repeated at midnight. Around this time he also had a sojourn at Big L 1395.

In April 2012, Hamilton was one of the launch presenters on The Wireless, an Internet-based radio station operated by Age UK and aimed at older people throughout the UK.

He was a founder director of Lite FM in Peterborough and Splash FM in Worthing, hosting the first programme with guest Leo Sayer in 2003.

In February 2021, he started a daily lunchtime show with Boom Radio, the national DAB station aimed at the baby boom generation.

== Stage ==
On stage Hamilton has compered shows by the Beatles, the Rolling Stones, David Cassidy and many other pop acts. He has hosted shows at the Royal Albert Hall and the London Palladium, and headlined in four major pantomimes.

In 2016, he embarked on a 40-theatre tour, David Hamilton's Rock 'n' Roll Back The Years, with band The Fugitives, and singers.

== Sport ==
Hamilton was the compere for the Wembley Lions Speedway team in 1970 and 1971. During the 1970s, Hamilton was also the match day presenter for the Reading Racers Speedway Club. Latterly he was seen frequently on BBC One's Match of the Day and BSkyB's Football First as he was the matchday compère at Fulham F.C. David was also compere at the 50th anniversary of Sheerwater FC's stalwart Trevor Wenden when the club celebrated his long standing support to the club and also the opening of their new ground. He also sponsors Merthyr Town's striker Iwan John's kit for the current season.

== Books ==
Hamilton is the author of six books: David Hamilton's Beauty Tips for Women, 1974, The Music Game (autobiography), 1986, A Fulhamish Tale, 2012, The Golden Days of Radio One, 2017, Commercial Radio Daze, 2020, and his autobiography The Long and Winding Road, 2024.

== Current work ==
In 2019, Hamilton celebrated 60 years in broadcasting. By this time he was heard regularly on his local stations BBC Radio Sussex and BBC Radio Surrey. His Million Sellers show continues to be aired on several stations in the UK and abroad.

In 2021, at the age of 82, Hamilton became the oldest broadcaster to present a daily show on national radio with his lunchtime show on Boom Radio. The same year David Hamilton's Million Sellers and David Hamilton's Hotshots launched on the Now 70s music television channel and he was a guest on Britain's Biggest 70s Hits on Channel 5. He has been a newspaper reviewer on Sky News and also began contributing to GB News in 2022. On 2 December 2023, speaking on Mark Dolan Tonight he disclosed during a royal family studio discussion, "I have nine grandchildren".

== Television ==
Show	Description	Year
ABC TV	Continuity announcer	1960–1968
Cue For Sport	Series Host, Tyne-Tees TV	1962
Living Your Life	Interviewer, ABC TV for ITV Network	1962
Blackpool Night And Day	Compere ABC TV	1963
ABC At Large	Interview with The Beatles	1963
Rehearsal Room	Pop Music Series Host, Tyne-Tees TV	1964
About Anglia	Interviewer, Anglia TV	1984
It's The Geordie Beat	Pop show host, Tyne-Tees TV	1964
The Bright Sparks	Children's TV series host, Tyne-Tees TV	1966–1967
Doddy's Music Box	Interviewer, ABC TV series for ITV network	1967–1968
Singalong	Music series host, Tyne-Tees TV	1967
Try For Ten	Quiz series host, Anglia TV	1967–1969
Pop The Question	Quiz series host, Tyne-Tees TV	1968
Goodbye From ABC	Writer and host, ABC TV	1968
Thames Television	Continuity announcer	1968–1982
Fashion From Woburn	Host, Thames TV	1968
Magic Circle Christmas Box	Host, Thames TV	1968–1969
Out Of School	Host, Thames TV	1969
Easter Holiday Sport	Host, Thames TV	1969
Whit Monday Sport	Host, Thames TV	1969
Epsom Derby Day	Interviewer, Thames TV	1969–1972
Glamour '69	Host, Beauty contest series Anglia TV	1969
Benny Hill Show	Interviewer, Thames TV	1969–1970, 1973
Dickie Henderson Show	Interviewer, Thames TV	1969
Doddy's Christmas Bizarre	Interviewer, London Weekend TV	1969
Dig And Run	Quiz series host, Westward TV	1970
1970 World Cup	Host, Thames TV	1970
Aladdin's Cave	Host, Thames TV	1970
Miss Westward	Host, Beauty contest series, Westward TV	1970, 1974
Just Look	Host, Children's series Yorkshire TV	1971–1972
Miss TV Times	Host Thames TV for ITV network	1971–1972
Christmas Cavalcade	Guest, London Weekend TV	1971
Once Upon A Time	Storyteller, Thames TV	1971
Ken Dodd Show	Series interviewer, ATV	1972
Miss TV Times London	Host, Thames TV	1972–1973
Miss London	Host, Thames TV	1972–1974
Chipperfield's Circus	Host, Thames TV for ITV network	1972–1973, 1976–1978
Monty Python's Flying Circus	Cameo role BBC TV	1973
European Figure Skating Championships	Host, Thames TV	1973
Ken Dodd Show	Interviewer	1973
Sunday Night At The London Palladium	Series voice-over, ATV	1974
Miss Thames TV	Host	1974
Porridge	Voice on radio, BBC TV	1974
Seaside Special	Series host, BBC TV	1975–1977
Today	Interviewer, Thames TV	1975–1977
Tommy Cooper Show	Series interviewer, Thames TV for ITV network	1975
Celebrity Squares	Guest, ATV	1975
Top Of The Pops	Series host, BBC TV	1976–1978, 1988
Smokie	Host, BBC TV	1976
Thames TV in New York	Newsreader/programme host	1976
Whose Baby	Guest, Thames TV	1977
Harry Secombe Christmas Special	Guest, Yorkshire TV for ITV network	1977
You Can't Be Serious	Guest, Thames TV	1978
Quick On The Draw	Guest, Thames TV	1978
Late Late Show	Guest, RTE	1978
Singalong With Sunshine	Guest, BBC Scotland	1978
Soft Touch	Guest, ATV	1978
Generation Game	Guest, BBC TV	1978–1981
Feeling Great	Guest, BBC TV	1978
World Disco Dance Championship	Host, Thames TV for ITV network	1978–1979
Magpie	Guest, Thames TV	1978
Blankety Blank	Guest, BBC TV	1979–1982, 1985
Northern Life	Guest, Tyne-Tees TV	1979
Nationwide	Guest, BBC TV	1979
Thames TV in Los Angeles	Newsreader/programme host	1979
Square One	Guest, Granada TV	1980
Give Us A Clue	Guest, Thames TV	1980
TV Times Awards	Host, Thames TV for ITV network	1980–1981
Up For The Cup	Host, Talent Show series ATV for ITV network	1980
Punchlines	Panel show guest, LWT	1980–1984
Life Lines	Guest, BBC TV	1981
Family Fortunes	Guest, ATV	1981
Friday Live	Guest, Tyne-Tees TV	1982
The Last Song	Guest, BBC TV	1983
Make Me Laugh	Guest, Tyne-Tees TV	1983
Babble	Guest, Channel 4	1983
Untied Shoelaces Show	Guest, BBC TV	1983
Pebble Mill At One	Guest	1983
Morecambe & Wise Show	Guest, Thames TV	1983
Game For A Laugh	Guest, LWT	1983
Cilla Black Show	Guest, LWT	1983
Child's Play	Guest, LWT	1984
Star Romances	Guest, TV-AM	1984
Saturday Night Affairs	Guest, BBC TV	1984
Late Late Breakfast Show	Guest, BBC TV	1984
Breakfast Time	Guest, BBC TV	1984
Pop The Question	Team captain of music quiz series, TVS	1985
Lifestyle	Host of many series including Coffee Break, David Hamilton's People SKY TV	1985–1993
I've Got A Secret	Guest, BBC TV	1986
Eurovision Song Contest Previews	Host, BBC TV	1986
Coast To Coast People	Guest, TVS	1987
That's My Dog	Guest, TSW	1987
All Clued Up	Host, Game show series TVS for ITV network	1988–1991
Quandries	Guest, TVS	1988
A Question Of Entertainment	Guest, BBC TV	1988
Central Weekend	Guest, Central TV	1988, 1996
The Time and The Place	Guest, TVS	1988
What's My Line?	Guest, Thames TV	1988
The Bottom Line	Guest, Thames TV	1988
Tell The Truth	Guest, TVS	1990
Ken Dodd Show	Thames TV	1990
15 To 1	Guest, Channel 4	1990, 1995
Crazy Connections	Guest, Celador	1990
Happy Families	Guest, Meridian TV	1993
You Bet	Guest, LWT	1993–1994
Living TV	Guest	1993–1995,
QVC	Music presenter	1994, 1996, 1997, 1999, 2000, 2001
Sky News	Reporter/guest	1994–1998, 2001, 2011
Through The Keyhole	Guest, BBC & ITV	1994, 2000, 2007
Travel Channel	Guest, 1994	1995–1996
Jobs For The Girls	Guest, BBC TV	1995
The Warehouse	Guest, Anglia TV	1995
Soccer AM	Guest, Sky	1995
Telephonin'	Guest, HTV	1995
Love In The Afternoon	Guest, Channel 4	1996
Bog Standard Chat Show	Guest, BBC TV	1996
Capital Woman	Guest, Mentorn	1996
Sportstalk	Guest, Granada TV	1996
Telly Addicts	Guest, BBC TV	1996
Esther	Guest, BBC TV	1997
Karioke Challenge	Guest, Challenge TV	1997
Pet Squad	Guest, Live TV	1997
Shooting Stars	Guest, BBC TV	1997
Talking Telephone Numbers	Guest, ITV	1997
Elvis Has Left The Building	Guest, Granada TV	1997
An Audience With Jim Davidson	Guest, ITV	1997
5's Company	Guest, Channel 5	1997
What's In The Box	Series Host, Live TV	1998
Living It Up	Guest, Living TV	1998
Hale & Pace	Guest, BBC TV	1998
Clive James on Television	Guest, Watchmaker TV	1998
Noel's House Party	Guest, BBC TV	1998
Kilroy	Guest, BBC TV	1998
Taking The Pitch	Guest, Granada TV	1998
New Year's Eve Is Rubbish	Guest, BBC TV	1998
The Day Britain Turned Disco	Guest, BBC TV	1999
Vanessa	Guest, BBC TV	1999
Mis-match Of The Day	Guest, Live TV	1999
Rocking The Blind	Guest, BBC TV	2001
The Real Julie Goodyear	Guest, Channel 4	2002
The Real Tony Blackburn	Guest, Channel 5	2002
Inside Out	Presenter, BBC TV	2002
19 Keys	Guest, Channel 5	2003
Anglia TV 50th Birthday Show	Narrator & Guest	2005
Fulham FC show	Series Host, Sky Sports	2006
It's Me or The Dog	Guest, Channel 4	2007
Richard and Judy Show	Guest, Cactus TV	2009
The Weakest Link	Guest, BBC TV	2009
Cash In The Celebrity Attic	Guest, BBC TV	2010
Bob Monkhouse Special	Guest, BBC TV	2010
Celebrity Eggheads	BBC TV	2010
Vintage TV	Presenter	2010–2011
The One Show	Guest, BBC TV	2011
Cricketer of The Year	Voice-over, Sky Sports	2011
The Untold Tommy Cooper	Guest, Channel 4	2011
Let's Dance for Sport Relief	Contestant, BBC TV	2012
Pointless Celebrities	Guest, BBC TV	2012, 2019
Antiques Road Trip	Guest, BBC TV	2012
Piers Morgan's Life Stories	Guest, ITV	2013
Amazing Greys	Guest, ITV	2014
David Hamilton Show	Series Host, Big Centre TV	2015
Ken Dodd Show	Guest, Channel 5	2016
When Game Shows Go Horribly Wrong	Guest, Channel 5	2017
Ken Dodd: How Tickled We Were	Guest, BBC 2	2018
When TV Guests Go Terribly Wrong	Guest, Channel 5	2020
Britain's Biggest 70s Hits	Guest (talking head contributor - various episodes/years), Channel 5	2021
GB News	panellist	2022
