= 2016 in British radio =

This is a list of events in British radio during 2016.

== Events ==
=== January ===
- 2 January – After 17 years as CD Review, the programme, broadcast on BBC Radio 3, reverts to its original name of Record Review.
- 18 January – Following Global Radio's purchase of Liverpool station Juice 107.6, the station is relaunched as Capital Liverpool.

=== February ===
- 19 February – BBC Radio Bristol stops broadcasting on MW following the sale of the land on which the transmitter was located to developers. In order to mitigate the loss of coverage the BBC switches on four new DAB transmitters in the area to help boost the station’s DAB coverage.
- 25 February – Tony Blackburn is dismissed by the BBC and Mark Goodier takes over as temporary host of Pick of the Pops.
- 29 February –
  - The UK’s second national commercial multiplex starts broadcasting but only 73% of the UK's population is able to receive it.
  - Absolute 80s, Planet Rock and Premier Christian Radio switch from Digital One to the new multiplex although the stations continue to broadcast on Digital One until the end of April.
  - Jazz FM is made available nationally as a digital station again after leaving the national DAB multiplex at the end of 2013.

=== March ===
- Undated in March – Manchester station Real Radio XS is rebranded as XS Manchester.
- 24 March – Mike Chadwick retires from Jazz FM after over 20 years.

=== April ===
- 9 April – Shortly after leaving BBC Breakfast, Bill Turnbull joins Classic FM to present the station’s weekend morning shows.
- 14–17 April – BBC Radio 2 broadcasts its third pop-up station – BBC Radio 2 50s.
- Undated in April – After two months of broadcasting on both national commercial multiplexes, Absolute 80s and Planet Rock stop broadcasting on Digital One. Consequently, the stations are no longer available on DAB in Devon, Cornwall, Dorset, parts of Scotland and Wales due to the reduced reach of the Sound Digital multiplex.
- 19 April – Insight Radio is rebranded as RNIB Connect Radio.

=== May ===
- 6 May – Orion Media announces that they have been bought by Bauer for an undisclosed fee, reportedly between £40 and £50 million. This gives Bauer the West Midlands network of Free Radio stations and East Midlands regional station Gem 106.
- 17 May – The Free Radio network's head of sport, Tom Ross, presents his final programme after 35 years working for BRMB, Xtra AM, Capital Gold and Free Radio.
- 20 May – Talksport is awarded the right to broadcast three Premier League UK live audio packages for the next three football seasons, starting with the 2016/17 season.
- Undated in May – Russ Williams leaves Absolute Radio. He was part of the original presenter line-up at Absolute Radio's predecessor Virgin 1215 (later Virgin Radio) although for the past year he had only been hosting the Saturday afternoon programme Rock and Roll Football, which ends following Absolute Radio's decision to drop its coverage of Premier League football.

=== June ===
- 1 June – A previous jingle package produced for Smooth Radio has been re-recorded for United Arab Emirates station 92 Smooth by Salford based Ignite Jingles.
- 17 June – Birmingham-based sports broadcaster Tom Ross presents his final Friday night football phone-in for Free Radio Birmingham after more than three decades with the station and its predecessor, BRMB.
- 21 June – The BBC completes its roll-out of BBC Local Radio on Freeview.
- 22 June – Jazz FM announces it will extend its morning business programme, Business Breakfast from 30 minutes to an hour on 24 June to cover the results of the EU membership referendum.

=== July ===
- 9 July – Paul Gambaccini replaces Tony Blackburn as host of Pick of the Pops.

=== August ===
- 15 August – Jazz FM introduces a new schedule. Clare Anderson's The Late Lounge is dropped, while Mark Walker succeeds Helen Mayhew as presenter of Dinner Jazz. New one-hour programmes are also introduced at 6pm.
- Undated in August – BBC Radio 5 Live's The Non-League Football Show ends when the BBC decides not to commission any more shows.

=== September ===
- Undated in September – Schedule changes at BBC Radio 5 Live see Peter Allen and Jane Garvey reunited to host a new Sunday evening show, Emma Barnett becomes the Wednesday to Friday host of 5 Live Daily and Nihal Arthanayake replaces Dan Walker as co-host of Afternoon Edition.
- 17 September – After 35 years, Robbie Shepherd retires as host of BBC Radio Scotland’s Take the Floor show.
- 19 September – BBC Cymru launches a pop-up radio station, Radio Cymru Mwy (Radio Cymru More), broadcasting for three months in the run-up to BBC Radio Cymru's 40th anniversary. Consisting of five hours of music-led entertainment programming each weekday, Radio Cymru Mwy is available on DAB in south east Wales and online.

=== October ===
- 28 October – Desmond Carrington presents his final show for BBC Radio 2, having presented weekly shows for the station for the past 37 years.

=== November ===
- 4 November – Free Radio Birmingham's breakfast presenter John Fox, known as Foxy, announces his departure from the station after six years presenting breakfast.
- 7 November – Dan Kelly and Naomi Kent succeed Foxy as Free Radio Birmingham's breakfast show presenters.

=== December ===
- 31 December – Tony Blackburn returns to BBC Radio 2.

== Station debuts ==
- 29 February – Heart Extra
- 15 March –
  - Mellow Magic
  - Talksport 2
- 21 March – Talkradio
- 27 March – Premier Praise
- 28 March – Magic Chilled
- 30 March – Virgin Radio
- 9 September – Union JACK

== Programme debuts ==
- 30 May – The Break on BBC Radio 4 (2016–2020)
- 15 June – Plum House on BBC Radio 4 (2014(pilot), 2016–2020)
- 3 November – The Fair Intellectual Club on BBC Radio 4 (2016)
- 5 November – 50 Things That Made the Modern Economy on the BBC World Service (2016–2017)
- 30 November – Women Talking About Cars on BBC Radio 4 (2016–2018)
- 13 December – Desolation Jests on BBC Radio 4 (2016–2017)

== Continuing radio programmes ==
=== 1940s ===
- The Sunday Hour (1940–2018)
- Desert Island Discs (1942 – present)
- Woman's Hour (1946 – present)
- A Book at Bedtime (1949 – present)

=== 1950s ===
- The Archers (1950 – present)
- The Today Programme (1957 – present)

=== 1960s ===
- Farming Today (1960 – present)
- In Touch (1961–Present)
- The World at One (1965 – present)
- The Official Chart (1967 – present)
- Just a Minute (1967 – present)
- The Living World (1968 – present)
- The Organist Entertains (1969–2018)

=== 1970s ===
- PM (1970 – present)
- Start the Week (1970 – present)
- You and Yours (1970 – present)
- I'm Sorry I Haven't a Clue (1972 – present)
- Good Morning Scotland (1973 – present)
- Newsbeat (1973 – present)
- File on 4 (1977 – present)
- Money Box (1977 – present)
- The News Quiz (1977 – present)
- Feedback (1979 – present)
- The Food Programme (1979 – present)
- Science in Action (1979 – present)

=== 1980s ===
- Steve Wright in the Afternoon (1981–1993, 1999–2022)
- In Business (1983 – present)
- Sounds of the 60s (1983 – present)
- Loose Ends (1986 – present)

=== 1990s ===
- The Moral Maze (1990 – present)
- Essential Selection (1991 – present)
- Essential Mix (1993 – present)
- Up All Night (1994 – present)
- Wake Up to Money (1994 – present)
- Private Passions (1995 – present)
- In Our Time (1998 – present)
- Material World (1998 – present)
- Scott Mills (1998–2022)
- The Now Show (1998 – present)

=== 2000s ===
- BBC Radio 2 Folk Awards (2000 – present)
- Big John @ Breakfast (2000 – present)
- Sounds of the 70s (2000–2008, 2009 – present)
- Dead Ringers (2000–2007, 2014 – present)
- Kermode and Mayo's Film Review (2001–2022)
- A Kist o Wurds (2002 – present)
- Fighting Talk (2003 – present)
- Jeremy Vine (2003 – present)
- The Chris Moyles Show (2004–2012, 2015 – present)
- Annie Mac (2004–2021)
- Elaine Paige on Sunday (2004 – present)
- The Bottom Line (2006 – present)
- The Christian O'Connell Breakfast Show (2006 – present)
- The Unbelievable Truth (2006 – present)
- Radcliffe & Maconie (2007 – present)
- Geoff Lloyd with Annabel Port (2008–2017)
- The Media Show (2008 – present)
- Newsjack (2009 – present)
- Paul O'Grady on the Wireless (2009–2022)
- Alan and Mel's Summer Escape (2009–2020)

=== 2010s ===
- The Chris Evans Breakfast Show (2010–2018)
- Graham Norton (2010–2020)
- Simon Mayo Drivetime (2010–2018)
- The Third Degree (2011 – present)
- BBC Radio 1's Dance Anthems (2012 – present)
- Late Night Graham Torrington (2012–2020)
- The Radio 1 Breakfast Show with Nick Grimshaw (2012 – present)
- Sounds of the 80s (2013 – Present)
- Question Time Extra Time (2013 – present)
- The Show What You Wrote (2013 – present)
- Friday Sports Panel (2014 – present)
- Home Front (2014 – present)
- Stumped (2015 – present)

== Ending this year ==
- 28 October – The Music Goes Round (1981–2016)

== Deaths ==
- 9 January – Ed Stewart ("Stewpot"), broadcast presenter (BBC Radio 2, BBC Radio 1) (Junior Choice) (stroke)
- 31 January – Sir Terry Wogan, broadcast presenter (BBC Radio 2, BBC Radio 1) (Wake Up to Wogan and Weekend Wogan) (cancer)
- 14 February – Ali Brownlee, football commentator (BBC Tees) (born 1959)
- 17 March – Cliff Michelmore, broadcast presenter (Family Favourites) (born 1919)
- 21 October – Dave Cash, broadcast presenter (BBC Radio 1, Capital London, Primetime Radio) (heart attack)
- 7 November – Sir Jimmy Young, broadcast presenter (BBC Radio 2, BBC Radio 1, BBC Light Programme)
- 22 November – Shirley Gee, radio dramatist (born 1932)
- 10 December – Ian McCaskill, weather forecaster (BBC Radio) (born 1938)
