= Free Radio (network) =

British regional radio network

- Birmingham; England
- Broadcast area: West Midlands
- Frequencies: FM: Birmingham; 96.4 MHz; Wolverhampton, The Black Country & Shropshire; 97.2 MHz 103.1 MHz; Coventry & Warwickshire; 97.0 MHz 102.9 MHz; Herefordshire and Worcestershire; 96.7 MHz 97.6 MHz 102.8 MHz
- RDS: Free BHM; Free SHR; Free WLV; Free C&W; Free H&W

Programming
- Format: CHR/Pop
- Network: Hits Radio

Ownership
- Owner: Bauer Media Audio UK
- Sister stations: Gem; Signal 1

History
- First air date: 26 March 2012
- Last air date: 17 April 2024

Links
- Website: Free Radio

Free Radio was a regional group of Independent Local Radio stations in the West Midlands, owned and operated by Bauer Media Audio UK as part of the Hits Radio network.

The Free Radio brand name was replaced by localised versions of Hits Radio on 17 April 2024.

== Overview ==
Free Radio launched on Monday 26 March 2012 as a result of the rebranding of four FM stations – BRMB, Beacon, Mercia and Wyvern.

On Tuesday 4 September 2012, a secondary AM station broadcasting 1980s chart music, Free Radio 80s, was launched.

The four FM stations are now subsumed into the Hits Radio network whilst the AM transmitters, which latterly carried Absolute Classic Rock, ceased broadcasting in April and June 2020.

== History ==
=== Free Radio ===
BRMB began broadcasting to Birmingham and the surrounding areas on 19 February 1974 – the fourth ILR station to launch in the UK and the first station of its kind outside London. Beacon Radio (later Beacon) has served Wolverhampton and the Black Country since 12 April 1976 with its licence area expanded to cover Shropshire in 1987. Mercia Sound (later Mercia) was launched in Coventry and Warwickshire on 23 May 1980, followed by Radio Wyvern (later Wyvern) in Herefordshire and Worcestershire on 4 October 1982.

These stations were initially run independently of each other, although by the late 1980s, BRMB and Mercia were under the ownership of Midlands Radio plc, alongside AM station Xtra AM, which broadcast on both stations' former AM frequencies. The group was bought for £18 million by Capital Radio plc in 1993, who sold Mercia to the GWR Group but retained BRMB. GWR went on to buy Beacon from its holding company BCCL in 1995 and Wyvern FM two years later. The four licences came under the same ownership in 2005 when GWR and Capital merged to form GCap Media.

GCap was taken over in 2007 by Global but the Office of Fair Trading ruled in August 2008 that Global would need to sell off BRMB, Beacon, Mercia, Wyvern and Heart's East Midlands station due to concerns over competition interests. The stations were bought in May 2009 by a consortium led by former Chrysalis Radio chief executive Phil Riley, trading as Orion Media. Heart East Midlands continued to operate under a franchise agreement with Global until January 2011, when the station was rebranded as Gem 106 and replaced most networked output with local programming from Nottingham.

On 9 January 2012, Orion announced that it would rebrand its four West Midlands local stations as Free Radio from March 2012 onwards. The former on-air station brands were phased out on Wednesday 21 March 2012 in preparation for the rebrand, which took place on Monday 26 March 2012 at 7pm.

On 6 May 2016, the network's owners, Orion, announced they had been bought by Bauer for an undisclosed fee, reportedly between £40 and £50 million. As of August 2016, Free Radio is aligned with the Hits Radio network, with the four local stations beginning to carry networked programming from Bauer's Manchester studios in February 2017.

In May 2019, following OFCOM's decision to relax local content obligations from commercial radio, Bauer announced it would cease local programming for two Free stations in Shropshire & the Black Country and in Herefordshire & Worcestershire. The decision led to the closure of studios in Oldbury and Worcester.

As of 8 July 2019, Free Radio carries two separate breakfast shows - one for the Birmingham, Black Country and Shropshire areas and a second for Coventry, Warwickshire, Herefordshire and Worcestershire. The four local drivetime shows were replaced by a single regional programme for the West Midlands, presented by Andy Goulding. Local news bulletins, traffic updates and advertising for the four licence areas are retained. Local weekend afternoon programming were replaced with additional network programming from Manchester.

From September 2019, the regional drivetime show was replaced with further networked programming from Manchester, including opt-outs for local news and traffic.

On 23 November 2021, Bauer announced the two Hits at Breakfast shows would be merged into one regional show across all four Free Radio licences, following the departure of Birmingham & Black Country presenter Dan Morrissey. Dan Morrisey can still be heard on sister station Magic Radio on weekends he openly announced on his final link. The merger was permitted under OFCOM's local content guidelines.

The new Hits at Breakfast show for the West Midlands, presented by John Dalziel and Roisin McCourt, began on Monday 29 November 2021. All four Free Radio licences will retain opt-outs for local news, traffic updates and advertising.

Bauer also announced it would move Free Radio from its Brindleyplace studios to a smaller facility at 54 Hagley Road in Edgbaston at the end of 2021.

==== Hits Radio rebrand ====
On 10 January 2024, station owners Bauer announced the four Free Radio stations would be rebranded as Hits Radio from April 2024, as part of a network-wide relaunch involving 17 local radio stations in England and Wales.

The station's local news and regional output will not be affected as a result of the relaunch.

=== Free Radio 80s ===
On 24 May 2012, Orion Media announced it would relaunch its Gold West Midlands stations on AM frequencies and DAB as Free Radio 80s. The station broadcast locally produced programming playing 1980s chart music alongside news & information and sports programming. The station launched on Tuesday 4 September 2012. The breakfast show was hosted by Dave Sherwood (and then by Phil Ray from 2015) and the sports commentary was presented by Tom Ross with a show called "The Goalzone".

On 7 January 2019, Free Radio 80s ceased broadcasting and replaced by Absolute Classic Rock on AM and DAB in Birmingham, Wolverhampton and Shropshire. Greatest Hits Radio West Midlands launched as part of the Greatest Hits Radio network on 105.2 FM in Birmingham and on 1359 kHz and DAB in Coventry, Herefordshire, Warwickshire and Worcestershire.

Transmissions on 990 and 1017 kHz ceased on 30 April 2020, followed by the closure of the 1152 kHz frequency on 30 June 2020.

== Programming ==
All networked programming originated from Bauer's Manchester studios.

Regional programming, under the Hits at Breakfast banner, was produced and broadcast from Bauer's Birmingham studios weekdays from 6-10am, presented by John Dalziel and Roisin McCourt.

Bauer's Birmingham newsroom broadcast localised news bulletins on the hour from 6am to 7pm on weekdays and from 7am to 1pm on weekends with headlines on the half hour during weekday breakfast and drivetime.
