= David Lloyd (broadcaster) =

English radio presenter and a former radio executive

- Occupation: Radio presenter
- Years active: 1977–present

David Lloyd (26 February 1961) is an English radio presenter and a former radio executive.

== Biography ==
Lloyd began his radio career in December 1977 on Nottingham Hospitals' Radio, from which he had previously been turned away for being too young. He joined Radio Trent in 1980.

At Trent, Lloyd presented the weekday afternoon show, and later, the mid-morning show, after Dale Winton left the station. Following a spell in junior management as presentation co-ordinator, he then moved to Leicester Sound as deputy programme controller in 1987 and subsequently as general manager. During this time, Lloyd also presented the weekday morning show and was its programme controller. In 1988, he oversaw the split of the FM and AM frequencies which saw Leicester Sound's AM signal switch to the new GEM AM service, and its FM signal remain as Leicester Sound, albeit under the name of 'Sound FM'. He won a Sony Radio Award for his documentary on the life of Elvis Presley.

After leaving Leicester Sound in 1991, Lloyd helped establish Lincs FM, the first Independent Local Radio station for Lincolnshire, which went on air in 1992 with Lloyd as the first voice heard on air. In 1995, he moved into media regulation on being appointed head of programming and advertising at the Radio Authority, then the industry regulator for commercial radio.

He returned to the East Midlands in 1998 to become managing director of the regional station Century 106, owned by Border Radio Holdings (later to become Heart 106, then Gem 106, and finally Gem), later becoming group programme director for all of Border's radio stations. In May 2000, Lloyd left Century to become managing director of the Yorkshire dance music station Galaxy 105 (now Capital Yorkshire). Alongside his management role at Galaxy, Lloyd was heard on another East Midlands regional station Saga 106.6 FM (now Smooth East Midlands) in February 2003, presenting a Sunday morning request show. The Galaxy station in Manchester (now Capital Manchester and Lancashire) was added to his management role, before being appointed managing director of London's news stations LBC.

In September 2007, Lloyd left LBC and joined Virgin Radio (now Absolute Radio) as its programme controller for a year. Following the station's sale, he returned briefly to a spell of presentation duties at BBC Radio Nottingham.

In April 2009, Lloyd was appointed as head of regional and local programming for BBC Yorkshire and Lincolnshire, based in Hull, but left that role after only a few weeks after being appointed group programming and marketing director of the newly-established Orion Media and its five Midlands-based FM stations — BRMB, Mercia FM, Wyvern FM, Beacon Radio in the West Midlands, and Heart 106 in the East Midlands. His was the first voice heard on Gem 106 (Now Gem) on New Year's Day 2011, when the station rebranded, after ending its association with the Heart Network.

Since the disposal of Orion Media to Bauer in 2016, Lloyd has been working as a radio consultant at various stations and related organisations around the world, and is currently chairman of the local TV station, Notts TV.

In February 2021, Lloyd co-launched (with fellow radio executive Phil Riley) Boom Radio, aimed at the baby boom generation.

A keen radio historian, Lloyd is also the author of How to Make Great Radio (2015), Radio Moments (2017) and Radio Secrets (2019).
