= Hits Radio Birmingham =

- Birmingham; United Kingdom
- Broadcast area: Birmingham
- Frequencies: FM: 96.4 MHz; DAB: 11C
- RDS: Hits
- Branding: Birmingham’s Hits Radio; The Biggest Hits, The Biggest Throwbacks

Programming
- Format: CHR/Pop
- Network: Hits Radio

Ownership
- Owner: Bauer Media Audio UK
- Sister stations: Hits Radio Coventry & Warwickshire; Hits Radio Herefordshire & Worcestershire; Hits Radio Black Country & Shropshire; Greatest Hits Radio Birmingham & The West Midlands; Xtra AM (1989–1998)

History
- First air date: 19 February 1974; 52 years ago
- Former names: BRMB; Free Radio Birmingham

Technical information
- Licensing authority: Ofcom

Links
- Website: http://hellorayo.co.uk/hits-radio/birmingham/

Hits Radio Birmingham, formerly BRMB and Free Radio Birmingham, is an Independent Local Radio station based in Birmingham, England, owned and operated by Bauer Media Audio UK as part of the Hits Radio network. It broadcasts to Birmingham and the West Midlands.

As of September 2024, the station has a weekly audience of 217,000 listeners according to RAJAR.

== History ==
The first BRMB logo. Variations were used through the 1980s.

The station was launched as BRMB on 19 February 1974, broadcasting on 261 metres medium wave, (1151kHz (moving in November 1978 to 1152 kHz) and 94.8 MHz FM. BRMB was the fourth independent local commercial radio station to begin broadcasting in Britain after LBC, Capital London and Radio Clyde. Broadcasting a mix of popular music with local news, live football coverage, information and specialist output, the station became popular amongst residents in Birmingham and later changed its main FM frequency from 94.8 to 96.4 in 1987.

In 1988, as a response to government disapproval of the simulcasting of programming on both FM and mediumwave, a sister station was launched on the 1152 kHz frequency. Xtra AM became BRMB's 'gold' service, playing classic hits, while BRMB itself began to cater for a younger audience. At this stage, BRMB was part of Midlands Radio plc, which was bought out along with Radio Trent, Leicester Sound and Mercia Sound by Capital Radio in 1993. However, they sold the other stations to the GWR Group whilst Capital kept hold of BRMB and Xtra AM. Xtra was on the air for nine years until the majority of its programming was switched to London, where it was simulcast with Capital Gold.

On 8 August 2008, it was confirmed that due to competition 'conflict of interests' in the West Midlands (and in other areas), BRMB would be sold by Global, along with other West Midlands owned GCap/Global stations Mercia FM, Wyvern FM, Heart 106 and Beacon Radio. In July 2009, the station was sold officially to a company backed by Lloyds Development Capital and Phil Riley which was named Orion Media.

On 9 January 2012, Orion Media announced that BRMB would be rebranded as Free Radio Birmingham, along with its sister West Midlands stations Beacon, Mercia and Wyvern. The BRMB brand, together with neighbouring stations Mercia, Beacon and Wyvern, were phased out on Wednesday 21 March 2012 in preparation for the rebrand, which took place at 7pm on Monday 26 March 2012. Live football commentaries on Aston Villa and Birmingham City matches continued to be broadcast on Free Radio 80s on AM and DAB until the end of the 2014–15 season.

On 6 May 2016, the station's owners, Orion, announced they had been bought by Bauer for an undisclosed fee, reportedly between £40 and £50 million.

In February 2017, most of Free Radio's off-peak networked output from Birmingham was replaced by programmes originating from Bauer's Manchester studios.

In May 2019, following OFCOM's decision to relax local content obligations from commercial radio, Bauer announced Free Radio's Birmingham breakfast show would be shared with the sister station in Shropshire and the Black Country from 8 July 2019, presented by Dan Morrissey. The localised weekday drivetime shows were initially replaced by a single regional show, presented by Andy Goulding.

Regional weekend afternoon shows were axed in favour of additional network programming. As of 2 September 2019, further networked output replaced the weekday drivetime show.

On 23 November 2021, Bauer announced the two Hits at Breakfast shows would be merged into one regional show across all four Free Radio licences, following the departure of Dan Morrissey. The merger was permitted under OFCOM's local content guidelines.

The new Hits at Breakfast show for the West Midlands, presented by John Dalziel and Roisin McCourt, began on Monday 29 November 2021. The Birmingham station retains opt-outs for local news, traffic updates and advertising.

Bauer also announced it would move Free Radio from its Brindleyplace studios in the city centre to a smaller facility at 54 Hagley Road in Edgbaston at the end of 2021. For a short period between the closure of Brindleyplace and the move to Hagley Road, the service was moved out of Birmingham to the Signal 1 studios in Stoke-on-Trent.

=== Hits Radio rebrand ===
On 10 January 2024, station owners Bauer announced Free Radio would be rebranded as Hits Radio Birmingham from April 2024, as part of a network-wide relaunch involving 17 local radio stations in England and Wales.

On 20 March 2025, Bauer announced it would end its regional Hits Radio breakfast show for the West Midlands to be replaced by a new national breakfast show for England and Wales on 9 June 2025. Local news and traffic bulletins were retained but the station's Birmingham studios were closed.

The station's final regional programme aired on 6 June 2025.

== Programming ==
Hits Radio network programming is broadcast and produced from Bauer’s London headquarters or studios in Manchester & occasionally Newcastle.

=== News ===
Hits Radio Birmingham broadcasts local news bulletins for the city hourly from 6am-7pm on weekdays, from 7am-1pm on Saturdays and Sundays. Headlines are broadcast on the half hour during weekday breakfast and drivetime shows, alongside traffic bulletins.

National bulletins from Sky News Radio are carried overnight with bespoke networked bulletins on weekend afternoons, usually originating from the Hits Radio Leeds newsroom.

== Station Information ==
BRMB was originally based in Aston Road North, in the Aston area of Birmingham, near the Spaghetti Junction. These were the former Alpha Television Studios, the home of ATV and ABC Weekend Television until 1970. In 1998 the station moved from Aston to the Oozells Building at 9 Brindley Place overlooking Broad Street. When the lease ran out they had a temporary move to the Stoke on Trent studios of Signal Radio.

Hits Radio /GHR studios after moving into new studios in 2023, are based at the 54 Hagley Road development in Birmingham city centre. Since August 2011, local programming for the Coventry and Warwickshire station has been produced and broadcast from Birmingham. Sister Station GHR West Mids share the same studio.

The FM signal – 10kW ERP – is broadcast from the Sutton Coldfield transmitter, and can be received throughout a large part of the West Midlands.

=== Events ===
As BRMB and Free Radio, the station organised a number of annual public events including the Walkathon and the annual live concerts at the LG Arena. The station also sponsored the Bupa Great Birmingham Run and the Acorns Midnight Walk.

== Notable past presenters ==
- Ed Doolan MBE (1974–1981) (deceased)
- Les Ross MBE (1976–2002, now at Boom Radio)
- Graham Torrington (later at Buzz FM, BBC Radio WM and BBC Radio Devon, now at Boom Radio, North Derbyshire Radio and MKFM)
- John Slater (1980–1991)
- Tony Butler (1974–1984) (later at BBC Radio WM and Xtra-AM) (died 14 July 2023)
- Elliott Webb (1997–2009) (now at BBC Hereford and Worcester)
- Margherita Taylor (now at Classic FM)
- Carlos (later at Smooth Radio, now at Heart 70s)
- Harriet Scott (now at Magic Radio)
- Paul Hollins (now at Smooth Radio)
- Jeremy Kyle (now at TalkTV)
- Dave Jamieson (now at Boom Radio)
- Tom Binns
- Tim Shaw (later at Rock FM)
- Mark Crossley (now at Absolute Radio)
- Graeme Smith (later at Real Radio North West, now at Capital Liverpool)
- Robin Banks
- James Merritt (now at Virgin Radio UK)
- Ed Nell (later at Free Radio Black Country & Shropshire, now at BBC Radio Nottingham)
- Jo Russell (later at Gem, now at Greatest Hits Radio 80s & Magic Radio)
- John Howard (later at BBC Radio 4)
- Sam and Mark (now at CBBC)
- Adrian Juste (1974–1977) (Later with BBC Radio 1)

== See also ==
- BRMB
