= Jo Russell =

English radio personality

- Born: 2 December 1970 (age 55); London, England
- Occupation: Radio presenter
- Known for: Greatest Hits Radio 80s, Greatest Hits Radio, Hits Radio East Midlands, Magic Radio

Joanne "Jo" Russell (born 2 December 1970) is a British radio presenter well known for presenting Hits Radio East Midlands Breakfast with Colerangle.

== Biography ==
Russell worked for an insurance company and Coca-Cola among other roles before beginning her broadcasting career at York Hospital Radio. She later moved on to hosting weekend shows at Stray FM in Harrogate and a full-time presenting role at York's Minster FM.

From 1998 onwards, Russell spent over ten years co-presenting Trent FM's award-winning breakfast show with Andy "Twiggy" Twigge, who had previously worked alongside her at sister station Ram FM in Derby. During this time, Russell won various awards for her work including four Sony Awards, the 2008 Arqiva Commercial Radio Presenter of the Year and Best Breakfast Show at the 2007 European Radio Awards. In September 2008, she joined Absolute Radio as the host of a weekend mid-morning show, which ran for around thirteen months.

A month after her departure from Absolute, Russell joined BRMB to host its flagship weekday breakfast show, The Jo Show. In November 2010, following a break from work due to illness, she began co-presenting the station's weekday drivetime show Jo and Sparky, alongside Mark "Sparky" Colerangle.

During 2011, Russell also presented Back to the 80s, a weekly Saturday night show for the East Midlands regional radio station Gem 106.

In 2014, Russell was awarded the Local and Regional Lifetime Achievement award by the Radio Academy.

In July 2015, Russell and Colerangle moved to Free Radio's Shropshire and Black Country station to co-present Jo and Sparky in the weekday breakfast timeslot, beginning on Monday 20 July 2015 at 6am. The pair joined sister station Gem 106 in 2016 to present a Saturday morning show.

In September 2017, it was announced Russell and Colerangle would leave Free Radio and join Gem full-time as presenters of the station's weekday breakfast show on Monday 16 October 2017, replacing Sam Pinkham and Amy Voce.

The Hits Radio East Midlands Breakfast Show ceased to broadcast on 6 June 2025, along with the other regional Hits Radio Breakfast shows. They were replaced with a National show hosted by Fleur East from Monday 9 June 2025. Russell continues with her Greatest Hits 80s show on weekdays 2pm-6pm, as well as providing cover, notably for Jenny Powell on weekend Breakfast shows.

On 14 June 2025, Russell was made the weekend afternoon host on Magic Radio. She takes over this slot permanently from Emma B.

Russell also covers for Ben Jackson's mid morning show on BBC Radio Leicester when he is away.

On 11 December 2025, it was announced that Russell and Colerangle is returning together on Magna Radio on a weekend brunch slot from 10-1pm from February 2026 after almost half a year off radio together.
