= How 2 =

- Presented by: Fred Dinenage; Gareth Jones; Carol Vorderman (1990–97); Siân Lloyd (1997); Gail Porter (1999); Gail McKenna (2000–06)
- Country of origin: United Kingdom
- No. of series: 15
- No. of episodes: 198

Production
- Running time: 30 minutes (later 15 minutes) (inc. adverts)
- Production companies: TVS (1990–91); Scottish Television (1992–2006) (Note: Later known as SMG TV Productions and STV Studios); Lion TV (2004–2006)

Original release
- Network: ITV (CITV)
- Release: 26 September 1990 – 1 September 2006

Related
- How (1966–1981)

How 2 is a British informative educational programme produced by TVS between 1990 and 1991, and STV Studios (Scottish Television) from 1992 to 2006.

The original show (How) was produced by Southern Television from 1966 up until 1981, when the company lost its franchise to TVS, which was a regular fixture in the ITV schedules.

== History ==
The show began in 1966 as How, a series popular in the 1970s. It was designed to provide answers to questions, beginning with the word "How". Each episode began with the presenters all raising one hand and saying "How" simultaneously (playing on the stereotypical Native American greeting). Common topics that were covered, included science, history, mathematics, and simple puzzles. The series came to an end in 1981, when Southern Television lost its ITV franchise, but was revived as How 2 in 1990, by TVS. The first two series were developed by TVS; however, on 16 October 1991, when it was announced that TVS had lost the franchise round to Meridian, several ITV companies were interested in taking over production of the show. Ultimately, Scottish Television won out and produced the show from series 3 onwards. After an intervening year at the Maidstone Studios, from series 4 until the end of series 15, taping of the show took place at STV's Glasgow Studios.

In addition to the regular series, two specials were also produced. This included a comedy special, produced especially for CITV's Comedy Week of programs in February 1997. Later the same year, a Christmas special was produced, which was filmed in Lapland.

In 2006, the final series was broadcast, having waited more than a year for transmission. Afterwards, series 14 and 15 were regularly repeated on the CITV channel, normally at weekends and some school holidays until the end of 2012.

A similar CITV show to appear a few years later was The Big Bang, presented by How 2's own Gareth Jones and Violet Berlin. The Big Bang had a more scientific slant, focusing on performing fun experiments involving simple physics and chemistry. Other similar British television series included Don't Ask Me. Fred Dinenage was the only presenter to appear in both incarnations of How, presenting the shows for a total of 31 years. On 6 January 2013, as part of CITV's Old Skool Weekend (a televised event celebrating the strand's 30th anniversary), the first episode of the 1995 series was shown. Prior to this, a How 2 segment was featured on the 30 Years of CITV documentary that aired on ITV on 29 December 2012 and featured interviews with Dinenage and Jones.

In 2019 How 2 was made available on Amazon Prime Video in the UK.

Also in 2019, the CITV channel commissioned a further revival of the format. Fred Dinenage made his third return to the series, alongside a new team of Vick Hope, Sam Homewood and Frankie Vu.

== Series overview ==
Series	Start date	End date	Episodes
1	21 September 1990	23 November 1990	10
2	23 September 1991	25 November 1991	10
3	7 September 1992	9 November 1992	10
4	6 September 1993	13 December 1993	15
5	5 September 1994	12 December 1994	15
6	4 September 1995	11 December 1995	14
7	9 September 1996	21 February 1997	16^{1}
8	1 September 1997	15 December 1997	^{2}16^{3}
9	5 January 1999	6 April 1999	13
10	10 January 2000	11 April 2000	13
11	22 January 2001	16 February 2001	20
12	11 February 2002	22 February 2002	10
13	10 January 2003	14 March 2003	10
14	4 June 2004	27 August 2004	13
15	5 May 2006	1 September 2006	13

Notes

^{1} The last episode of the series was a comedy special, aired as part of CITV's comedy week.
^{2} Before that, there was "The Best of How 2" which aired on 18 August 1997.
^{3} The last episode of the series was a Christmas special.

== How Goes 2 ==
There was no regular series in 1998, but there was a spin-off series called How Goes 2, which aired from 25 February to 15 April 1998. This series focused on Fred and Gareth going to different places each week, and the eight shows featured segments from the first six-year run, that cast the original three presenters.
