= Greatest Hits Radio Birmingham & the West Midlands =

Greatest Hits Radio Birmingham & The West Midlands
- Birmingham; United Kingdom
- Broadcast area: West Midlands
- Frequencies: FM: 105.2 MHz (West Mids); 107.2 MHz (Kidderminster); DAB: 11C (Birmingham)
- RDS: Grt_Hits
- Branding: The Good Times Sound Like This; Across Birmingham & The West Midlands

Programming
- Format: Classic Hits
- Network: Greatest Hits Radio

Ownership
- Owner: Bauer Media Audio UK
- Sister stations: Hits Radio Birmingham

History
- First air date: 4 September 2012
- Former names: Free 80's
- Former frequencies: 1152 MW; 1359 MW

Links
- Website: Greatest Hits West Midlands

Greatest Hits Radio Birmingham & The West Midlands is an Independent Local Radio station based in Birmingham, England, owned and operated by Bauer as part of the Greatest Hits Radio network. It broadcasts to the West Midlands. The station forms part of Greatest Hits Radio Midlands.

As of March 2024, the station broadcasts to a weekly audience of 411,000 listeners, according to RAJAR.

== History ==
=== Gold ===
Orion Media was formed in 2009, following the purchase of five Midlands-based radio stations – namely BRMB, Mercia, Wyvern, Beacon and Heart 106 from Global for a sale price worth £37.5 million. In early 2012, Orion announced plans to rebrand BRMB, Beacon, Mercia and Wyvern into one station as a means of generating greater revenue. They were renamed as Free on 26 March 2012. Many of these stations had previously operated an AM-based Gold service, all of which had been subsumed over time into Global's Gold network – Orion continued to run the AM stations as part of the Gold network on a franchise agreement, albeit with additional local opt-outs for extra sports coverage, including live football commentaries.

==== Sports coverage ====
Up until the rebrand of the FM stations, BRMB, Beacon and Mercia broadcast live football commentaries on Aston Villa, Birmingham City, Coventry City, West Bromwich Albion and Wolverhampton Wanderers matches, under the Goalzone strand. The commentaries were subsequently moved to Gold, six months before the launch of Free 80s, and continued until the end of the 2014–15 season.

The following season, Free 80s continued to air sports programming under The Goalzone strand, an hour-long chat show on Monday and Friday evenings. On 17 May 2016, the network's head of sport, Tom Ross, presented his final programme after 35 years working for BRMB, Xtra AM, Capital Gold and Free.

=== Free Radio 80s ===
On 24 May 2012, Orion Media announced it would relaunch its Gold West Midlands stations on AM frequencies and DAB as Free Radio 80s. Gold was replaced by test transmissions for Free Radio 80s in the final week of August, and was officially launched on 4 September 2012.

On 6 May 2016, the station's owners, Orion, announced they had been bought by Bauer for an undisclosed fee, reportedly between £40 and £50 million.

=== Greatest Hits Radio ===
On 7 January 2019, Free 80s was replaced by Absolute Classic Rock on 990, 1017 and 1152 kHz and on DAB in Birmingham, Wolverhampton and Shropshire. The AM transmitters were later closed, 990 and 1017 kHz on 30 April 2020, and 1152 kHz on 30 June 2020.

Free 80s rebranded as Greatest Hits Radio West Midlands, replacing Absolute Radio on 105.2 FM. In Coventry and Warwickshire the station broadcast on 1359 kHz (although this later closed on 30 June 2020), and continues on DAB only in Herefordshire and Worcestershire, forming part of Greatest Hits Radio network.

On 23 November 2021, Bauer announced it would move GHR West Midlands from its Brindleyplace studios in the city centre to a smaller facility at 54 Hagley Road in Edgbaston at the end of 2021.

== Programming ==
Greatest Hits Radio Birmingham & The West Midlands produces a mix of local and networked programming from Bauer's Birmingham studios.

On weekdays, the station opts out of networked programming for a regional three-hour afternoon show from 1-4pm. Late night shows with Alex Lester and weekend breakfast shows are networked from the Birmingham studios to the Greatest Hits Radio network.

The rest of Greatest Hits Radio's output originates from the network's Manchester and Liverpool studios, the studios of Greatest Hits Radio Glasgow & The West in Glasgow and Bauer's Golden Square headquarters in Soho.

=== News ===
Bauer's Birmingham newsroom broadcasts local news bulletins hourly from 6am to 7pm on weekdays and from 7am to 1pm at weekends. Headlines are broadcast on the half-hour during weekday breakfast and drivetime shows, alongside traffic bulletins. National bulletins from Sky News Radio are carried at other times.

== Frequencies ==
- Herefordshire & Worcestershire – 107.2 FM
  DAB: 12A (MuxCo)
- West Midlands (county) – 105.2 FM &
  DAB: 11C (CE Birmingham)
