= Dan Wood (broadcaster) =

Dan Wood is an English broadcaster, DJ, podcaster and video producer.

== Background ==
Wood studied New Media Production and English Language at the University of Lincoln while pursuing a career in broadcasting, website creation, and DJ work.

== Career ==
Wood worked as an on-air radio personality for several UK radio networks including Global Radio and Bauer Media since 2001. He presented the weekday mid-morning show on Gem 106 in the East Midlands until 2022 and programmes on the Free Radio network.

Previously, Wood presented 'Music On Demand' a daily nationally syndicated programme across 38 radio stations on GCap Media's The One Network from 2007-2009, along with regular shows on GWR FM and Red Dragon FM. He was also heard on various Emap Radio stations in the 2000s, including Viking FM, Radio Aire, Metro Radio, The Hits Radio and Heat radio. Dan also hosted the syndicated Floorfillers dance music show and was involved in the accompanying compilation CD albums.

Wood hosted and mixed the syndicated weekly 'Dan Wood In The Mix' radio show from 2008-2013 which aired on radio stations around the world including Rapture Radio, SS Radio Deep & Soulful, Gaydio, and Pure Dance.

Outside of radio broadcasting, Wood produces video and audio content relating to technology, video games and computers. He presented videos for Channel Flip and Chris Pirillo's Lockergnome network from 2007-2010, as well as his own technology focused Youtube channel.

In 2010, Wood co-hosted the Logic Weekly podcast with Craighton Miller, a weekly technology news summary and discussion show.

He currently co-hosts The Retro Hour podcast with Ravi Abbott, a weekly audio podcast focussing on the history of video games and personal computers. The podcast has interviewed many industry veterans including Tom Kalinske, John Romero, Richard Garriott and The Oliver Twins. Wood and Abbott regularly host the podcast live at events such as PLAY Expo Manchester and Blackpool.

Wood founded a network of music websites under the Mirrorball brand from 1996-2001 which received coverage in Mixmag and 7 Magazine.

Wood held weekly and guest residencies playing electronic music, mainly house and UK garage, at various bars and clubs across Yorkshire and the Midlands, including fronting his own night under the Mirrorball brand, a chain of Bodymoves UK garage nights and supporting DJ EZ and the Dreem Teem on various tours and dates.
