= Charlotte Hindle =

English television producer and presenter

- Born: 1964 or 1965 (age 60–61)
- Occupations: Television presenter, producer
- Years active: c. 1980s–1990s
- Known for: Presenting Get Fresh and 8:15 from Manchester
- Relatives: Madge Hindle (mother)

Charlotte Hindle is an English television producer and former presenter, best known for her work on children's television during the late 1980s and earlier 1990s. She was a main presenter for the programmes Get Fresh and 8:15 from Manchester.

== Career ==
Hindle began her television career in the late 1980s as a co-presenter on the ITV Saturday morning children's show Get Fresh. She co-hosted alongside Gareth Jones.

In 1990, Hindle joined the presenting team for children's Saturday morning show, the BBC's 8:15 from Manchester, which ran for two years.

Hindle subsequently moved into producer roles behind the camera, including Songs of Praise from 2016 to 2022.

== Filmography ==
- Get Fresh (1986–1988)
- 8:15 from Manchester (1990–1991)
