= Bad Influence! =

British television series (1992–1996)

- Presented by: Andy Crane; Violet Berlin; Sonya Saul (1995–96)
- Starring: Andy Wear (Nam Rood: 1992–94); Z Wright (1992–94)
- Theme music composer: Ernie Wood
- Country of origin: United Kingdom
- Original language: English
- No. of series: 4
- No. of episodes: 57

Production
- Running time: 20 minutes
- Production company: Yorkshire Television

Original release
- Network: ITV (CITV)
- Release: 29 October 1992 – 2 January 1996

Bad Influence! is a 1990s British factual television programme broadcast on CITV from 1992 to 1996, produced in Leeds by Yorkshire Television. It looked at video games and computer technology, and was described as a "kid's Tomorrow's World". It was shown on Thursday afternoons and had a run of four series of between 13 and 15 shows, each of 20 minutes duration. For three of the four series, it had the highest ratings of any CITV programme at the time. Its working title was Deep Techies, a colloquial term derived from 'techies' basically meaning technology-obsessed individuals. The show's finished title was a reference to how video games were often viewed by the UK press at the time.

== Format ==
Presenter Violet Berlin

Cheats expert "Nam Rood"

Bad Influence! began during the 16 bit-era of computer and video gaming, and featured in-depth news, previews and reviews about the very latest in gaming and computer technology. The series ran long enough to feature the launch of the Nintendo 64 console (then acknowledged by its working title, the Ultra 64) in its fourth and final series. The show was originally presented by then children's TV presenters Violet Berlin and Andy Crane (former Children's BBC presenter), who were studio based, and US teen actor Z Wright, who filed location reports from the US for the first three series. There was also a cheats segment character called Nam Rood (which is "door man" backwards, played by Andy Wear), an anarchic "furtler" who lived in a shed in the first two series, and then in the basement for Series 3. He would give viewers gaming cheats (written on cards he would stick to his forehead) in between mock experiment comedy sketches three times per episode. He would always greet viewers with his trademark catchphrases "slimy furtlers" and "scrotty furtlers", the term "furtler" equating to the term "techie". In one 1995 episode he gave a "cheat for Sonic Six", which did not exist at the time (and neither does today) and thus was a joke. It allowed the user to play "The forest level" as the new character "Elbows the Squirrel".

Other features included three game reviews per episode by teenagers local to the area where Bad Influence! was produced, namely the city of Leeds in West Yorkshire. Although these teenagers stints on the show varied, a small number appeared in all four series of the programme. Each game was given two separate scores, one from the girls and one from the boys. Although the majority of mid-programme reports were filed from the US by Z Wright, they were sometimes filed by Violet Berlin and on rare occasions by Andy Crane, in place of Z Wright. The programme usually focused on PC and Amiga segments early on in an episode, with more console-based segments later on. There was also a weekly competition towards the end of the programme, directly before one of the show's most distinctive features – the 'Datablast' sequence. The Datablast – which viewers were encouraged to record on their video recorders – consisted of a number of pages of gaming articles and information that were flashed rapidly onto the screen during the credits. Viewers could then read the pages by replaying it in slow motion on their video player. The information consisted of a watered down version of most of that episodes features, as well as some exclusive content, such as Top Ten video games charts.

In Series 1, a spin-off Bad Influence! magazine was launched by Europress and promoted on the show; however, only two editions were ever published.

In Series 2, as part of a report, Violet Berlin was included as a character in the Mega Drive game Micro Machines 2. She was also included in another video game in Series 4, The Beast Within: A Gabriel Knight Mystery, during which Berlin visited the United States to report on its making.

In Series 3, the show experienced a revamp. The virtual reality title sequence and credits, which by the end of Series 2 had begun to look somewhat dated, were replaced by a new, industrial-style title sequence, influenced by the mega-flop beat-em-up Rise of the Robots. There was also a remixed, industrial-style theme tune and a slightly more anarchic feel to the show, suggesting it was now targeting a slightly older teen audience. This demographic refocusing was in tune with gaming trends which were moving more towards older teens and younger adults, yet at odds with CITV viewer trends which showed that CITV audiences were actually getting younger. Also in Series 3, the Datablast section only appeared once, at the end of the series, which would prove to be its final appearance. Also making their final appearance were Z Wright and Nam Rood.

In Series 4, the final series, Z Wright had been replaced by Violet Berlin presenting global reports (rather than solely US reports) and she was also granted her own slot, called Virtual Violet. Back in the studio, Crane was now joined by new co-presenter Sonya Saul. Nam Rood and the Datablast had both been discarded. In the final edition, Berlin, Crane and Saul all presented together in the studio, the only time this ever occurred.

Shortly after the fourth series ended, a report on the now defunct television information service Teletext reported that plans were afoot to remarket Bad Influence! at a younger audience if it were to get a Series 5. However, these plans were never implemented, most likely because gamers were getting older, whilst CITV's audience was getting younger, and so would have had little appeal to CITV's increasingly younger audience. Subsequently, a fifth series was not commissioned and the show was cancelled.

== Transmissions ==
Apart from two weeks over the Christmas period in the first series, the transmission of each series was uninterrupted until Series 4. Whilst the first three series aired on Thursdays, Series 4 was the only one to air on Wednesdays (except the final episode, which aired on a Tuesday). The run was interrupted several times, with no episodes broadcast on 18 October 1995, 22 November 1995 or 20 December 1995. There was a three-week gap between the penultimate and final episodes of Series 4. The final episode then went out on 2 January 1996, the only episode to air that year.

Series	Start date	End date	Episodes
1	29 October 1992	4 February 1993	13
2	9 September 1993	16 December 1993	15
3	8 September 1994	15 December 1994	15
4	6 September 1995	2 January 1996	14

The show was broadcast from February 1994 in Czech Republic by TV Nova as Špatný vliv, with support from Czech video game magazine called Excalibur.

== Bad Level 10 ==
A spin-off series called Bad Level 10 aired on The Children's Channel.

Series 1: (26 episodes, each ten minutes long) broadcast from 20 February 1995, and presented by Violet Berlin, alongside "assistant presenter" Steve Keen, who was originally a researcher on Bad Influence! The series, like its parent programme, was also produced by Patrick Titley and Yorkshire Television.
