= Lloyds Associated Banking Company =

Lloyds Bank (LABCO) Limited
- Company type: Subsidiary undertaking
- Industry: Banking and Financial services
- Founded: 1971; 55 years ago
- Defunct: 1985; 41 years ago
- Successor: Lloyds Merchant Bank
- Headquarters: London, United Kingdom
- Parent: Lloyds Bank Plc

Lloyds Associated Banking Company Limited (LABCO) was the merchant banking arm of Lloyds Bank in the United Kingdom from 1971 until 1985, when it became part of the newly formed Lloyds Merchant Bank.

== History ==
LABCOs activities as a licensed deposit-taking institution under the Banking Act 1979, were centred on the raising and lending of sterling funds in the wholesale market, bidding for sterling deposits at market rates independently of the normal branch deposit account system and providing medium-term loans to customers falling outside the bank's usual lending arrangements. Operating principally in the London inter-bank sterling market, it matched deposits and loans closely, thus minimising its exposure to risk. In 1982, Lloyds Associated Banking Company was renamed Lloyds Bank (LABCO) Limited and, in 1985, it became a wholly owned subsidiary of Lloyds Merchant Bank Holdings as a primary market maker in the new gilt-edged market, under the name Lloyds Merchant Bank (Government Bonds) Limited.

=== Lloyds Merchant Bank ===
Lloyds' merchant banking activities included capital markets, corporate finance, development capital, export and project finance, and investment management services. Lloyds Merchant Bank Limited ceased to operate as a separate business unit in 1993, but the parent bank's activities, which were re-organised around market segments, continued in development capital, investment management and stockbroking.

== See also ==
- Lloyds Development Capital
