= Gareth Jones (presenter) =

Welsh television presenter and celebrity (born 1961)

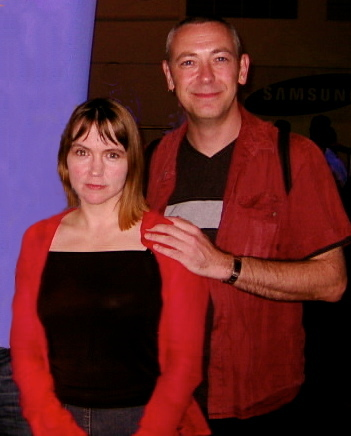
- Jones with former partner Violet Berlin in 2003
- Born: 5 July 1961 (age 65); St Asaph, Wales
- Other name: Gaz Top
- Occupations: Television presenter; podcaster
- Years active: 1985–present
- Website: garethjones.tv

Gareth Jones (born 5 July 1961), also known as Gaz Top, is a Welsh television presenter.

Best known for his work as a presenter of children's television and science programmes such as How 2 and Get Fresh, he has more recently moved to presenting motorsport podcasts and directing and producing programmes. In the summer of 2021 he became the first person to swim across Wales from south to north, whilst making a three-part documentary series for Welsh broadcaster S4C called Gareth Jones: Nofio Adre.

== Career ==
Jones was born in St Asaph, Wales, and grew up in Holywell, Flintshire. When he began his career in 1979, he used the name "Gaz Top", a name he earned whilst working as a roadie for The Alarm.

Gareth Jones On Speed is a car and motorsport podcast written and performed by Gareth Jones and made by TV and podcasting production company WhizzBang.

== Personal life ==
Since March 2024, he has lived in north Wales. He moved away from North London after an amicable separation from his long-term partner, Violet Berlin. They have two sons together. He is a Welsh language speaker.

== Credits ==
Date	Role	Show
2021	Presenter/Executive Producer	Gareth Jones: Nofio Adre (Swimming Home)
2020	Presenter	Gwilio Ser Y Nos (Watching the Night Stars)
2015–2017	Actor (as Miff Ferrie)	The Tommy Cooper Show
2015	Actor (as "Gaz Top")	Caryl A'r Lleill (Caryl & The Others) S4C
12/9/2015	Contestant	Pointless Celebrities
2015	Interviewee	Wales in the 70s
2014	Interviewee	50 Greatest Kids TV Shows
2014	Actor (as "Gaz Top")	Caryl (S4C)
2012	Interviewee	30 Years of CITV
2006	Guest	Holly and Stephen's Saturday Showdown
2005	Guest	Ministry of Mayhem (ITV50 Special)
2005	Guest	Dick & Dom in da Bungalow
2005–present	Presenter/Producer	Gareth Jones On Speed (Podcast)
2005–2006	Pit Lane reporter	A1 Grand Prix worldwide TV feed
2004	Presenter	Speed Sunday ITV1
2002–2004	Director	Gamepad on Bravo
2003	Presenter	Tomorrow's World
1997	"The Joker"	Megamaths
1996	Presenter	It's Not Just Saturday
1996–2001	Presenter	The Big Bang
1992	Presenter	Clwb Clebran
1990–2006	Presenter	How 2
1990–1991	Presenter	The Children's Channel
1986 (as Gaz Top)	Presenter	BMX BEAT
1986–1988 (as Gaz Top)	Presenter	Get Fresh
1985–1986 (as Gaz Top)	Presenter	Music Box
1979–1985 (as Gaz Top)	Roadie	The Alarm
