= The 8:15 from Manchester =

British children's television series

- Genre: Children's
- Presented by: Ross King; Charlotte Hindle; Dianne Oxberry (1991)
- Country of origin: United Kingdom
- Original language: English
- No. of series: 2
- No. of episodes: 43

Production
- Production location: New Broadcasting House
- Running time: 160 minutes

Original release
- Network: BBC1
- Release: 21 April 1990 – 14 September 1991

The 8:15 from Manchester is a British children's television series that aired on BBC1 on Saturday mornings from 21 April 1990 to 14 September 1991. The show took its name from a train departing from Manchester Piccadilly station for London Euston, which was, and still is at 08:15. It was presented by Ross King and Charlotte Hindle. BBC Radio 1 and subsequently BBC North West weather presenter Dianne Oxberry joined for the second series. Like the previous BBC1 Saturday Morning Summer shows it would finish at 10:55am to allow Grandstand to start earlier to show live cricket the other weeks a film would be shown before Grandstand at 12:30.

The format was very similar to Going Live!, with imported cartoons (Rude Dog and the Dweebs, The Jetsons and Defenders of the Earth) punctuating items, such as games, music performances and interviews. A regular segment in the first series was "It's Tough at the Top", a Snakes & Ladders game where two teams of two contestants had to win the game without landing on a "snake" and sliding down into a pool of Gunge. This was replaced in the second series with The Wetter The Better, a game show based in a swimming pool (filmed in Blackpool) and hosted by Ross King with the scores being kept by Sonia. A weekly drama was shown, in which the short episode ended in a dilemma of some sort (e.g. should x tell her sister that y has been cheating on her). Two endings had been filmed and viewers telephoned to vote which ending would be shown.

== Transmissions ==
Series	Start date	End date	Episodes
1	21 April 1990	15 September 1990	22
2	20 April 1991	14 September 1991	21
