= Get Fresh =

British TV series (1986–88)

- Starring: Gareth Jones; Charlotte Hindle; Gian Sammarco (Series 1); Gilbert the Alien (Series 2-3 & Get Fresh Sunday)
- Theme music composer: Mick Jones of Big Audio Dynamite
- No. of series: 5
- No. of episodes: 91 (60 Saturday, 31 Sunday)

Production
- Producers: Janet Street-Porter; Tim Edmunds; Mike Forte
- Production companies: Tyne Tees Television Central Unit & 6 episodes Border Television 11 episodes & Get Fresh Sunday; HTV Wales 4 episodes HTV West 4 episodes Scottish Television 9 episodes Grampian Television 5 episodes Ulster Television 5 episodes Television South West 9 episodes Anglia Television 6 episodes Television South 1 episode

Original release
- Network: ITV (CITV)
- Release: 3 May 1986 – 28 August 1988

Get Fresh is a children's television programme that originally aired from 1986 to 1988 in the United Kingdom.

== Format ==
Gareth Jones & Gilbert the Alien.

A Saturday-morning kids' TV show, broadcast on the Children's ITV block, the show featured Gareth Jones (aka Gaz Top), Charlotte Hindle, and, for the first year of its run, Gian Sammarco, the British child actor best known for his portrayal of the character 'Adrian Mole'. Sammarco was replaced for the 2nd and 3rd series by a puppet named Gilbert the Alien (voiced by Phil Cornwell).

Each week the series would be broadcast from a different UK location and centred on the Millennium Dustbin, a fictional space ship in which the presenters would travel the country. The show invited a live audience to attend and give vox-pop comments, to give presentations on local community activities, and to participate in games and challenges. Pop stars would also appear to perform on the show.

The weekly music strand of the show featured musical guest interviews and pop gossip. The segment was hosted each week by Nino Firetto and David "Kid" Jensen.

The show featured a unique play-by-phone challenge, using the Atari ST video game Xenon, where viewers would call in and shout "left, left, right, shoot" commands to a blindfolded player. Get Fresh also featured the animated series The Centurions and The Adventures of the Galaxy Rangers.

== Spin-offs ==
Get Fresh Sunday was a pre-recorded Sunday morning edition of the show also presented by Gaz, Charlotte and Gilbert. This spin-off featured The Adventures of Teddy Ruxpin and Gummi Bears and studio-based interviews and features, and was more item-based than the activity driven Saturday live show.

Gilbert later featured in a further two series for Tyne Tees Television, Gilbert's Fridge (1988) and Gilbert's Late (1990).

== Production notes ==
The series was administrated by Tyne Tees Television from a Central Unit based at their London office, but was produced in conjunction with the local ITV station from where the series was to broadcast that week.

Get Fresh Sunday was produced solely by Border Television.

The theme music for the programme was written by Mick Jones of The Clash and Big Audio Dynamite fame.

=== Series 1 – 1986 ===
- 3 May – The Glebe, Boness-on-Windermere (Border)
- 10 May – Coney Beach Pleasure Park, Porthcawl (HTV Wales)
- 17 May – Tuxedo Princess, Newcastle (Tyne Tees)
- 24 May – Glasgow Mayfest (Scottish)
- 31 May – Carmunnock Highland Games (Scottish)
- 7 June – Portrush (Ulster)
- 14 June – Cardiff Castle (HTV Wales)
- 21 June – Colchester Zoo (Anglia)
- 28 June – Bath Festival of Steam (HTV West)
- 5 July – Weymouth Beach (TSW)
- 12 July – Bellahouston Park, Glasgow (Scottish)
- 19 July – Aberdeen (Grampian)
- 26 July – Swaffham (Anglia)
- 2 August – Whitehaven Harbour (Border)
- 9 August – Scone Palace, Perth (Grampian)
- 16 August – Ashton Court Park, Bristol (HTV West)
- 23 August – Tyne Tees Studios, Newcastle (Tyne Tees)
- 30 August – Carlisle Castle (Border)
- 6 September – Beamish Open Air Museum, County Durham (Tyne Tees)
- 13 September – Plymouth Hoe (TSW)

=== Series 2 – 1987 ===
- 25 April and 2 May – "Get Ready for Get Fresh" (Studio-based episodes made by Border)
- 9 May – Sheepmount Athletics track, Carlisle (Border)
- 16 May – Yeovil (TSW)
- 23 May – Duxford Air Museum (Anglia)
- 30 May – Edinburgh Castle (Scottish)
- 6 June – Aberdeen Exhibition and Conference Centre (Grampian)
- 13 June – Lakeland Forum, Enniskillen (Ulster)
- 20 June – Ulster Folk Museum (Ulster)
- 27 June – New Lanark Old Mill Town (Scottish)
- 4 July – Cardiff Ice Rink (HTV Wales)
- 11 July – Plymouth (TSW)
- 18 July – Newquay (TSW)
- 25 July – Kelso Agricultural Fair (Border)
- 1 August – Clydebank (Scottish)
- 8 August – Northumberland Scout and Guide Camp, Gosforth Park (Tyne Tees)
- 15 August – Border TV, Carlisle (Border)
- 22 August – Norwich (Anglia)
- 29 August – Bristol (HTV West)

=== Series 3 – 1988 ===
- 9 April – Newcastle, County Down (Ulster)
- 16 April – Giant's Causeway (Ulster)
- 23 April – Maritime Museum, Exeter (TSW)
- 30 April – Lord Montagu's Transport Museum, Beaulieu (TVS)
- 7 May – St Austell (TSW)
- 14 May – Great Yarmouth (Anglia)
- 21 May – Galloway Games, Stranraer (Border)
- 28 May – Ferry Meadows Country Park, Peterborough (Anglia)
- 4 June – Roman fort, South Shields (Tyne Tees)
- 11 June – Dundee (Grampian)
- 18 June – Killington Lake services (Border)
- 25 June – Glasgow Show, Bellahouston Park (Scottish)
- 2 July – Summerlee Heritage Trust, Coatbridge (Scottish)
- 9 July – Eden Court Theatre, Inverness (Grampian)
- 16 July – Glasgow Garden Festival (Scottish)
- 23 July – Teignmouth (TSW)
- 30 July – Douglas, Isle of Man (Border)
- 6 August – Metrocentre, Gateshead (Tyne Tees)
- 13 August – Tropicana, Weston-super-Mare (HTV West)
- 20 August – Tavistock Meadows (TSW)
- 27 August – Margam Country Park, Port Talbot (HTV Wales)

== Transmission guide ==
- Series 1: 20 editions from 3 May 1986 – 13 September 1986
- Series 2: 19 editions from 25 April 1987 – 29 August 1987
- Series 3: 21 editions from 9 April 1988 – 28 August 1988
