= Hits Radio East Midlands =

Coordinates: 52.94881°N 1.13418°W

- Nottingham; United Kingdom
- Broadcast area: East Midlands
- Frequencies: DAB: 10B (Lichfield transmitting station); 11B (Copt Oak); 12C (Waltham transmitting station)
- Branding: The East Midlands’ Hits Radio; The Biggest Hits - The Biggest Throwbacks; Across the East Midlands

Programming
- Format: CHR/Pop
- Network: Hits Radio

Ownership
- Owner: Bauer Media Audio UK
- Sister stations: Greatest Hits Radio East Midlands

History
- First air date: 23 September 1997 (as Radio 106 FM)
- Former names: Radio 106 FM; Century 106; Heart 106; Gem 106; Gem
- Former frequencies: 106.0 FM

Links
- Website: Hits Radio East Midlands

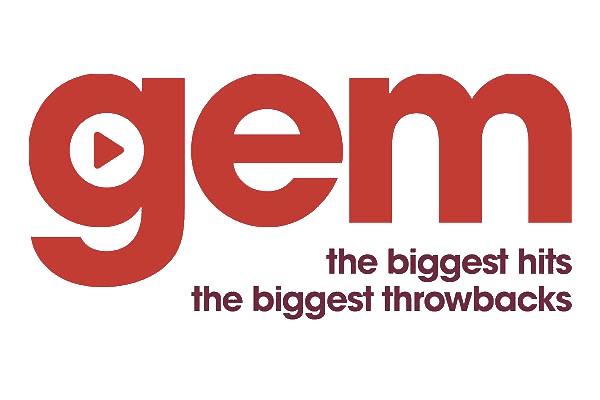
Logo used until 2024.

Hits Radio East Midlands is an Independent Regional Radio station based in Nottingham, England, owned and operated by Bauer Media Audio UK as part of the Hits Radio network. It broadcasts to the East Midlands.

As of September 2024, the station has a weekly audience of 157,000 listeners according to RAJAR.

== History ==
=== Radio 106 ===
Radio 106 launched at 6 am on Tuesday 23 September 1997 as the East Midlands’ Independent Regional Radio station. Billed as Radio for Grown Ups, with an advertising campaign on Central TV for the launch, and an episode of Central TV's '24 hours' in 1998 documented the launch and the relaunch of the station, the station was launched by ex-Radio Trent managing director Ron Coles with former Centre Radio MD Ken Warburton as programming controller. The first presenter on air was Dickie Dodd.

Radio 106's launch schedule included a heavy emphasis on speech content, including daily guests on mid-morning shows and a nightly 3-hour phone-in. Specialist music output featured country, soul and Motown at weekends. The station's launch team included Kevin Fernihough, Mark Keen, Willie Morgan, Kenny Hague, Jake Yapp, Peter King and Sarah Graham.

Against competition from established BBC Local Radio and GWR-owned commercial stations, Radio 106 recorded poor listening figures, so within seven months of launch, the station's owners Border Radio Holdings opted for a complete relaunch.

=== Century 106 ===
In April 1998, John Myers took control of the station, which was rebranded as "Century 106" and relaunched with a new team of presenters, including Adrian Allen and Chris Ashley. Former Radio Trent presenter David Lloyd became the station's Managing Director and Programme Controller with ex-Trent colleagues including Tony Lyman, Craig Strong, Gary Burton and Andy Marriott joining the presenting line-up. Other additions to the team included Steve Jordan (breakfast) and Bernie Keith (afternoons).

In May 2000, Century 106, along with the other Century stations in the North East and North West, were sold to Capital Radio. David Lloyd left the station to join Galaxy 105 in Leeds while presenter Adrian Allen walked out mid-show in protest. The sale to Capital brought an increase in the station's sports coverage - as emphasised in the slogan music, fun and football. More new presenters joined Century, including Ian Skye, Jason King, Stuart Ellis, Sam Pinkham and Paula White.

=== Heart 106 ===
When Capital later merged with GWR, the Office of Fair Trading ordered Century to be sold off. Chrysalis bought Century 106 for £29.5m and planned to rebrand the station as Heart 106, to go with 100.7 Heart FM in the West Midlands as the area matched that of the ITV Central region and would make it more attractive to advertisers.

Heart 106 was launched on 29 August 2005. A further, more subtle rebrand was applied in September 2006 which saw the dropping of the frequencies from station names across the Heart Network.

On 25 June 2007, Chrysalis announced the sale of Heart, along with its sister stations The Arrow, LBC and Galaxy, for £170 million to Global Radio.

Following Global's takeover of GCap Media, the Office of Fair Trading again ordered Global to sell off Heart and four other Midlands stations - BRMB, Mercia FM, Wyvern FM and Beacon Radio. In May 2009, the stations were sold to Orion Media, a company backed by Lloyds Development Capital and Phil Riley.

=== Gem 106 ===
On 9 November 2010, Orion Media announced that Heart 106 would be relaunched and renamed as 'Gem 106' on 1 January 2011. Under the rebrand, the station ended its franchise agreement with Global Radio which allowed it to use the Heart identity and carry networked programming from London.

Gem 106 was launched at midnight on Saturday 1 January 2011 with a special programme presented by Orion's director of programming and marketing David Lloyd. The GEM name stands for 'Great East Midlands', the name created and used from 1988 onwards for GEM-AM (later Classic Gold GEM) an AM (medium wave), 'solid gold' secondary service of Radio Trent. The majority of the station's programming is locally produced and broadcast from Nottingham.

As of March 2016, Gem refreshed their imaging and jingle package using a custom package from Wisebuddah, at which point the '106' was dropped from the name.

On 6 May 2016, the station's owners, Orion, announced they had been bought by Bauer for an undisclosed fee, reportedly between £40 and £50 million. As of August 2016, Gem is aligned with the Hits Radio network, using its generic on-air imaging package. The station retained its own regional programming throughout the day.

In July 2019, Gem began taking overnight programming from the Hits Radio Network in Manchester on Sunday - Thursday nights before gradually expanding to evening and off-peak output.

As of May 2022, Gem broadcasts a regional breakfast show on weekdays from the Nottingham studios, alongside hourly news bulletins seven days a week and traffic updates at peak times. All other programming output comes from the Hits Radio Network.

=== End of analogue broadcasting - 106 MHz FM ===
On 29 August 2023, Bauer announced that from 2 October 2023, Gem will be available only on DAB and online, while its FM frequency, 106 MHz will be switched to Greatest Hits Radio, stating that 'there are so many FM frequencies in the area it was not possible for both stations to be on FM at once'.

At 10:00pm on 1 October 2023, Gem ceased FM transmissions. The station's FM frequency, 106 MHz FM, was switched to Greatest Hits Radio East Midlands.

=== Hits Radio rebrand ===
On 10 January 2024, station owners Bauer announced Gem would be rebranded as Hits Radio East Midlands from 17 April 2024, as part of a network-wide relaunch involving 17 local radio stations in England and Wales.

On 20 March 2025, Bauer announced it would end its regional Hits Radio breakfast show for the East Midlands to be replaced by a new national breakfast show for England and Wales on 9 June 2025. Local news and traffic bulletins were retained but the station's Nottingham studios were closed.

The station's final regional programme aired on 6 June 2025.

== Audience ==
According to RAJAR figures up to June 2016, the station was listened to by 503,000 people (out of a possible 2,384,000 listeners) per week, with each listener tuning in for an average of 7.1 hours over the course of 7 days.

== Programming ==
Hits Radio network programming is broadcast and produced from Bauer’s London headquarters or studios in Manchester & occasionally Newcastle.

=== News ===
Hits Radio East Midlands broadcasts regional news bulletins on the hour from 6am-7pm on weekdays, from 7am-1pm on Saturdays and Sundays. Headlines are broadcast on the half hour during weekday breakfast with traffic updates every 20 minutes during weekday drivetime.

National bulletins from Sky News Radio are carried hourly at all other times, apart from Sunday afternoons.

== Presenters ==
- Notable past presenters
  - Sam Pinkham and Amy Voce (Weekday breakfast) (2006-2017)
  - Sam Nixon & Mark Rhodes
  - Dan Wood
- Jo Russell and Mark ‘Sparky’ Colerangle (Weekday breakfast) (2017-2025)

== Notts TV link-up ==
Since August 2015, Gem's weekday breakfast show has been simulcast live on Notts TV with a live video feed from the studio. As of February 2017, Gem Anthems on Fridays 6-10pm and Saturdays 5pm-midnight is also simulcast on the channel.
