= When Games Attack =

- Genre: Entertainment
- Created by: Johnny Ffinch
- Presented by: Dominik Diamond; Caroline Flack
- Country of origin: United Kingdom
- Original language: English
- No. of series: 1
- No. of episodes: 20

Production
- Running time: 30 minutes (inc. adverts)

Original release
- Network: Bravo
- Release: 2004 – 2005

Related
- Gamepad

When Games Attack is a British television show, that originally aired on Bravo from 2004 to 2005. The show is presented by Dominik Diamond and created by Jonny Ffinch with whom he had previously worked on GamesMaster. Its focus was video games.

== Stage ==
When Games Attack was not based in a studio, instead, it was filmed in a different location for each episode with the locations usually dictating the sort of humour and jokes Diamond used in each 30 second link between segments.

Examples of locations:

- A Fruit & Veg stall (Dominik ends the episode claiming he will go home with "A banana for the wife")
- Outside Celtic Football Club's stadium.
- Dominiks fishing trip (again, he makes a sexual innuendo saying something similar to "The times when you sit alone with a rod in your hand are the best moments of your life")
- A bus stop (In this episode, Dominik claims he laughs at tourists trying to figure out UK bus timetables, saying we all know they are as accurate as your average weapons dossier. This was during the claims about Weapons of Mass Destruction in Iraq.)
- Las Vegas (Dominik gets "arrested" for speeding but warns the officer he "Knows Richard and Judy", minor British celebrities.)
- Council estate. (Dominik ends the episode telling the viewers he is going to hang around street corners looking "hard" until his mother calls him in for tea. This is poking fun at Neds as they tend to come from council estates and do just as Dominik claimed he was about to do.)
- Dominiks house as he baby-sits his young children.
- An empty Hallway. (Because he has been "A bad boy" and has to think about what he did, as if he were a misbehaving child.)

== Show structure ==
Each 30-minute show featured several sections such as:

"I'm Famous, Give Me My Joypad!"

Eight Premiership and Championship football players took part in a head-to-head tournament playing Pro Evolution Soccer. Alternately, it featured a dancing contest with five glamour models. The girl would usually wear clothing that was not suitable to dance in and compete at Dance Dance Revolution or DDR for short. Before and after the girls danced, Dominik would often flirt with them, only to be shot down every time.

Behind the Game

A history of certain games ranging from Space Invaders to Grand Theft Auto. Viewers would be told the story of how the game was created, where the ideas came from and what impact it had on the world as footage of the game played with small facts scrolling across the bottom of the screen.

Head to Head

This section starred Dominik and two mute teddy bear puppets: a rusty-coloured one with a cream-coloured face and ears called Cugly and a white one with pink ears and paws called Queeny. For comedy purposes, Diamond and the two bears would appear to have been caught in the act of something (often illegal) such as a seedy chat line and selling uranium on the black market.

Each puppet would pick one of two video games that were similar such as Tekken vs. Virtua Fighter or Grand Theft Auto vs. True Crime: Streets of LA. Dominik would then rate each game on graphics, gameplay and so forth with the losing puppet doing a "forfeit" which was usually either bizarre or very violent. The segment closed with a corny joke, such as after losing, Cugly is stuffed into a washing machine as Dominik exclaims "Don't worry, Cugly! It's all good clean fun!"

On Location

Dominik travels to locations around the United Kingdom and America ostensibly to review events such as the San Diego Comicon, however these sections would more often present a thinly veiled excuse for him to make fun of the people and places he visited.

When Flack Attacks

Caroline Flack hosts a brief segment in which she travels around Japan looking at weird, wonderful and bizarre things such as giant robots, cosplay and how an anime is made. Frequently Flack makes note of how different eastern culture is from western culture. When she attended a cosplay convention, as grown men queued to take photographs of a presumably young girl in costume, Caroline pointed out that had they been in Britain they all would be arrested by now.

Bunch of Five

A chart that runs throughout the show. Often unique topics such as "The 5 worst abuses of women in videogame", "The 5 most disappointing endings", or "The 5 best videogame deaths".
