= Davinia Palmer =

Davinia Palmer (née Parton; born 7 March 1980) is a Welsh TV presenter and voiceover artist now based in the US.

== Radio career ==
Davinia Palmer began her career in entertainment as a radio host in 1997. She was a ‘new music’ reviewer on Leigh Jones' evening show on Swansea's The Wave 96.4 FM

Her first solo show was in 1998 at Preston’s 97.4 Rock FM; where she presented weekend overnights. In 1999, Davinia went on to host at Cardiff’s Red Dragon FM. Davinia began presenting the Hot 30 Countdown at 2 Ten FM in Reading in November 1999. Staying within the GWR Group she continued to host the Hot 30 Countdown on Worcester’s Wyvern FM in 2000, before her final move within the group to Wolverhampton's Beacon FM at the end of the same year. During her time at GWR she also hosted on GWR's national contemporary DAB digital radio station CORE.

In 2017, Davinia started working on air for 95.3 The Beach and B98.5 two stations both owned by Dimes Media in San Luis Obispo County, California.

== Breaking into television ==
Davinia moved to London, and transitioned into TV Hosting in 2001 presenting on T:tv at Oxford Circus's Topshop. She continued to work weekend radio shows at Oxford's Fox FM, presenting the Interactive Juke Box.

== BBC Radio 1 ==
In 2003, Davinia Palmer became the voiceover for BBC Radio 1's on air imaging and station sound. Here, she voiced many campaigns and shows including BBC Radio 1's Official Chart Show then hosted by Wes Butters, and the Sony Radio Academy Award Bronze winner for BBC Radio 1 Campaign of the Year in 2005. Around this time she was also the station voice for GCAP's Chill on the DAB digital radio platform. She voiced BBC One's BBC Summer Campaign, and various trails for CBBC and CBeebies, as well as voicing production for BBC Radio 5 Live, including their Sony Radio Award Gold Winning Production in 2004.

== National TV ==
In 2004, Davinia Palmer presented on price-drop tv broadcast on Sky Digital and Freeview in the UK. In 2004 to 2005 she was also a continuity announcer on LIVINGtv. In late 2005 she became the imaging voice for Chrysalis Radio's Heart network within the UK.

== International TV ==
Davinia signed with the Daniel Hoff Agency in Los Angeles in winter 2005. Living overseas she continued to record UK radio imaging for Heart FM, and Chill, and she also became the voice of GCAP's Holiday FM broadcast across Europe.

In October 2007 in the US Davinia started working as a TV host on QVC; She resigned within a year, her last show aired in October 2008.

In 2011, Davinia is currently represented by WME, (William Morris Endeavour) in Los Angeles, CA - under Eric Seastrand. l Since 2007, she has been the female station voice of Bauer Radio's Big City Network including Key 103, Rock FM, Radio City, Radio Aire, Viking FM, TFM Radio, CFM, Metro Radio and Hallam FM and as of 2010 Bauer's The Hits in the UK. In 2010, her voice launched the worldwide TV campaign of Paco Rabanne's new signature fragrance for women 'Lady Million', featuring Dree Hemmingway She is also the voice of Cunard Line's 'White Star News' played aboard the "Queen Elizabeth", "Queen Mary" and "Queen Victoria" cruise liners. She is the storyteller voice of Oceanhouse Media's "Elmer the Patchwork Elephant" apps downloadable for iOS (iPhone, iPad, iPod Touch).
