= Violet Berlin =

British TV presenter, producer, writer (b. 1968)

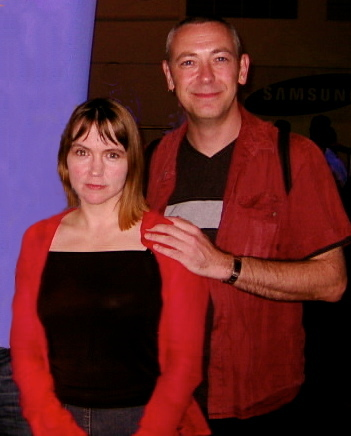
- Berlin with former partner Gareth Jones in 2003
- Born: 2 January 1968 (age 58); Zonguldak, Turkey
- Occupations: Television presenter; producer; script writer
- Presenting career
- Show: WildBunch, Cool Cube, Bad Influence!, Saturday Disney, The Big Bang, Real Time Apollo: One Small Step, Gamepad
- Country: United Kingdom

Violet Berlin (born 2 January 1968) is a British television presenter, producer and script writer for films, games and immersive experiences, best known for her pioneering coverage of innovative technology and video games.

== Career ==
Berlin first appeared on television screens in the 1990s, as a presenter on WildBunch on BBC1 and as writer-presenter for live youth magazine show Cool Cube for BSkyB from 1990 to 1992. On Cool Cube she produced and presented the first regular coverage of computer and video games on British television. She went on to present Bad Influence! between 1992 and 1996, a video gaming series which she hosted with Andy Crane on ITV. As well as presenting from the studio, Berlin covered outside reports in the USA and Japan and wrote and presented her own opinion features as "Virtual Violet".

Berlin then went on the host a number of other terrestrial shows, including live entertainment show Saturday Disney and long running ITV popular science show The Big Bang. On the 30th anniversary of the historic Apollo 11 flight in July 1999, along with Jon Snow, she co-hosted the live UK Channel 4 programme Real Time Apollo: One Small Step.

She helped devise branching narrative games for the BBC and Science Museum, she has written the scripts for large-scale projection-mapped films, including an immersive visual poem for Gardens by the Bay in Singapore and she created the dramatic characters who appear as part of the British Museum's Temple of Amaravati interactive experience in 2018, where visitors summon pilgrims to an ancient Buddhist shrine.

== Personal life ==
Berlin lives in Stoke Newington with her two sons. She sometimes appears on her ex-partner Gareth Jones's motoring podcast Gareth Jones on Speed which celebrated its 400th episode in October 2020. Berlin and Jones have been separated since 2021, with Jones relocating to Wales.

== Roles in video games and films ==
Berlin has cameos in at least five popular video games. She is well known as a playable character in the 1994 Codemasters racing videogame Micro Machines 2: Turbo Tournament and subsequent sequels, including Micro Machines World Series revived from 2017, and also appears as a non-player character in Gabriel Knight 2 and Normality and as herself in Peter Gabriel's game EVE.

In 2022, Berlin played the role of Queen Isabella of France in an immersive film shown to visitors in the gatehouse when they visit Leeds Castle in Kent.
