= Orion Media =

British radio group

- Type: Private
- Industry: Media
- Founded: 2009
- Defunct: 2016
- Fate: Acquired by Bauer Media Group
- Headquarters: Birmingham, England, UK,
- Key people: Adrian Serle, Chief Executive; David Lloyd, Director of Programming & Marketing; Mark Evans, Finance Director
- Website: www.orionmedia.com

Orion Media was a UK commercial radio group, founded in 2009 after a management buy-in, with backing from Lloyds Development Capital. It was created from the enforced sale of several radio stations in the English Midlands previously owned by Global Radio.

In May 2016, the company was sold to Bauer Media Group.

== History ==
Following Global Radio's acquisition of GCap Media in 2007, it was deemed that Global had an unfair advantage in the West Midlands market as they owned the vast majority of stations.

The OFT wanted to re-install competition in the Midlands area, causing Global to sell some of their stations. In May 2009, LDC and the buy-in team purchased BRMB, Mercia, Wyvern, Beacon in the West Midlands and Heart 106 in the East Midlands from Global Radio for a total price of £37.5 million, beating off competition from several other interested parties These stations accounted for around three per cent of the total commercial radio audience at the time.

In June 2009, the new group was named Orion Media.

In January 2011, Orion's East Midlands station Heart 106 was rebranded and relaunched as Gem 106, following the end of a franchise agreement with Global Radio allowing the station to use the Heart branding and carry networked programming from London.

In January 2012, Orion Media announced that its four FM stations in the West Midlands region were to be renamed 'Free Radio' – replacing the individual names BRMB, Mercia, Wyvern and Beacon. The rebranding took place at 7 p.m. on Monday 26 March 2012.

On 24 May 2012, Orion Media announced it would relaunch its Gold West Midlands stations on AM frequencies and DAB as Free Radio 80s later in the year. The station, which aired networked programming from London with opt-outs for sports programming, switched to locally produced output playing 1980s music alongside news and information and live football commentaries on Monday 4 September 2012, ending a franchise agreement with Global Radio which allowed the station to carry Gold branding and output.

On 6 May 2016, Orion announced they had been bought by Bauer for an undisclosed fee, reportedly between £40 and £50 million.

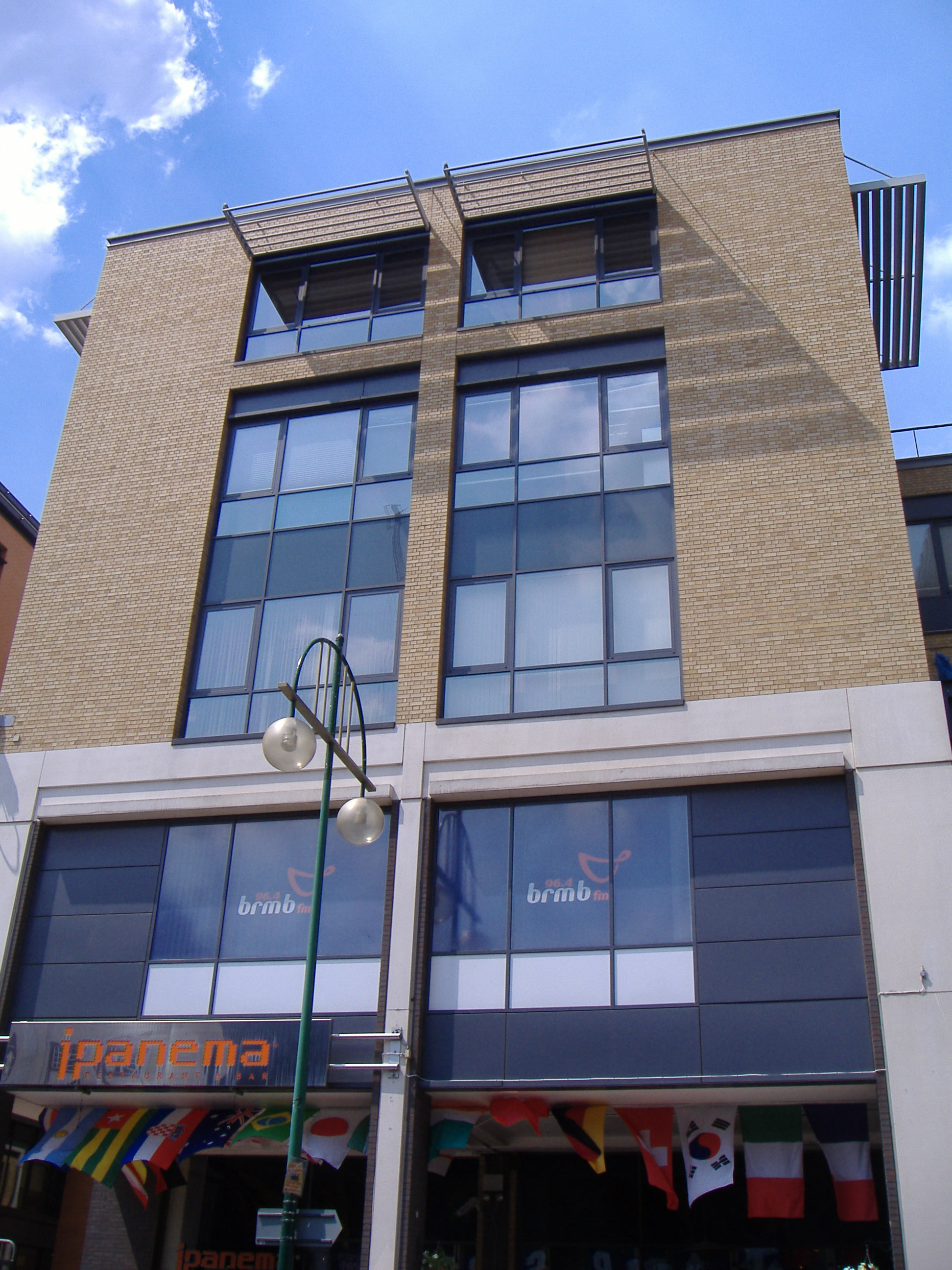
Orion Media headquarters on Broad Street, Birmingham

== Stations owned ==
Station name	Former name	Based in	Broadcast area	Frequency and multiplex	Format	Transmission date
Free Radio Birmingham	BRMB	Birmingham	Birmingham	96.4FM, CE Birmingham	Hot AC	19 September 1974
Free Radio Coventry & Warwickshire	Mercia	Birmingham	Coventry and Warwickshire	97.0, 102.9FM, NOW Coventry	Hot AC	23 May 1980
Free Radio Herefordshire & Worcestershire	Wyvern	Worcester	Herefordshire and Worcestershire	97.6, 96.7, 102.8FM, MuxCo Herefordshire and Worcestershire	Hot AC	4 October 1982
Free Radio Shropshire & Black Country	Beacon	Wolverhampton	Shropshire and Black Country	103.1, 97.2FM, NOW Wolverhampton	Hot AC	12 April 1976
Gem	Heart 106	Nottingham	East Midlands	106.0FM, NOW Nottingham, NOW Leicester	Adult Contemporary	23 September 1997
Free Radio 80s	Gold	Birmingham	West Midlands	990, 1017, 1152, 1359AM, CE Birmingham, NOW Wolverhampton, NOW Coventry	1980s music	4 April 1989, 15 January 1989
