= Sam Pinkham =

British broadcaster

Sam Pinkham is an English radio and television presenter. He previously presented radio programmes for Virgin Radio UK, Magic Radio, Heart and Gem 106. He has more recently been a cover presenter on BBC Radio 2 and he currently hosts popular TV series Holiday Homes In The Sun on Channel 5 with Amanda Lamb and JB Gill

Sam Pinkham hosts The Sun online bike blog. Honda worked with him for their Just Ride campaign with Virgin Radio. He also hosts TheCarCrowd's YouTube channel and fronts many of The Car Crowd's videos and events.

Pinkham is also known for his on-air work with Amy Voce, presenting the Sam and Amy breakfast show on Gem 106 (formerly Heart East Midlands) for eleven years. The programme won two Gold Radio Academy Awards (2013 & 2014), Gold at the 2015 Arqiva Commercial Radio Awards and Silver at the 2016 ARIAS. The duo have also presented cover shows for BBC Radio 2 and Magic.

== Biography ==
Pinkham began his radio career as a traffic reporter for stations including the first incarnation of Virgin Radio, Northants 96, and Leicester Sound. He joined Century 106 in 2002 as weekend breakfast presenter, before moving onto drivetime and in 2006, the flagship weekday breakfast show. Between 2010 and 2015. Sam was a cover presenter on Gem 106. He covered Saturdays 10am-1pm and Sundays 8pm-12am but his main show was the breakfast show with Amy 6am-10am weekdays and various morning shows during Christmas.

On television, he presented The Big Bang for CITV and a series on caravaning and camping for Men and Motors. From August 2015 until September 2017, the 'Sam and Amy' show for Gem 106 was simulcast live on local television channel Notts TV.

On 29 September 2017, Pinkham and Voce left Gem 106 to join national DAB station Virgin Radio UK to present its weekday breakfast show between Monday 2 October 2017 and Friday 18 January 2019. He currently presents a weekday early show on the station.

Away from broadcasting, Pinkham is also a director of AtomicMedia, a digital marketing agency. He is also the brother of Sky Sports F1 presenter Natalie Pinkham.
