= The Big Bang (TV series) =

- The Big Bang logo used for series 5 and 6 from 2000–2001
- Starring: Kate Bellingham (1996–1997); Gareth Jones (1996–2001); Violet Berlin (1998–2001); Michael Underwood (2002–2003); Kate McIntyre (2002–2004); Sam Pinkham (2004)
- Country of origin: United Kingdom
- Original language: English
- No. of series: 9
- No. of episodes: 92

Production
- Running time: 15 minutes
- Production company: Yorkshire Television

Original release
- Network: ITV (CITV)
- Release: 15 April 1996 – 8 September 2004

The Big Bang is a CITV science show broadcast from 15 April 1996 – 8 September 2004 and produced by Yorkshire Television. It is notable for being one of CITV's longest-running science programmes. The aim of the programme was to make science fun and interesting for children.

== History ==
Starting in 1996, The Big Bang was originally presented by Gareth Jones and Kate Bellingham. Kate Bellingham left after the second series to care for her new child. Gareth Jones's long-time friend and then partner Violet Berlin was her replacement for the third series in 1998. The show essentially stayed the same before a new logo and set design was introduced for the fifth and sixth series in 2000 and 2001. Both Gareth and Violet left the show after the sixth series as they were, as said by ITV at the time, "concentrating on running their own company [WhizzBang] and looking after baby Indigo". However, Gareth Jones later revealed on his website that they left because "when we were asked to do the 2002 series it looked like many of the people who usually make the programme with us wouldn't be doing it any more. There were lots of changes planned for the Big Bang which Violet & I didn't agree with, so we said thank you for the last 6 series and wished them all the luck for the future."

For the seventh series the show had another rebrand, notably a new theme tune, the first since the beginning of the show, however the old theme tune was brought back for the final two series. There was also a new logo, and new presenters Kate McIntyre and Michael Underwood were introduced. The set stayed remained mainly unchanged, however the neon The Big Bang sign in the kitchen was not replaced with the new logo until series 8. Michael and Kate presented the show together for two series, until Michael left to present Ministry of Mayhem, and for the ninth and last series he was replaced with Sam Pinkham.

In 2003, a shorter 5-minute version of the show, The Little Bang, was introduced at weekends. It took one section from a normal Big Bang episode and displayed what was needed for the make at the beginning of the show.

After the show ended, it was repeated daily on Discovery Kids UK, who started showing it with the first series and all the way up until the sixth before the channel closed in 2007. Afterwards, series 7, 8 and 9 were regularly repeated on the CITV channel, normally at weekends until the end of 2012.

In Vietnam from 2003, all series of the show were originally aired on HTV7, later on HTV1 (public) and HTV4 (education & science).

== Series guide ==
Series	Episodes	Broadcast	Presenters
1	8	15 April – 24 June 1996	Gareth Jones and Kate Bellingham
2	9	7 April – 16 June 1997	Gareth Jones and Kate Bellingham
3	9	6 April – 6 July 1998	Gareth Jones and Violet Berlin
4	8	10 May – 5 July 1999	Gareth Jones and Violet Berlin
5	13	18 April – 18 July 2000	Gareth Jones and Violet Berlin
6	13	30 April – 17 May 2001	Gareth Jones and Violet Berlin
7	15	11 June – 30 July 2002	Michael Underwood and Kate McIntyre
8	7	7 July – 18 August 2003	Michael Underwood and Kate McIntyre
9	10	7 July – 8 September 2004	Sam Pinkham and Kate McIntyre
