= Gamepad (TV series) =

- Genre: Entertainment
- Presented by: Violet Berlin
- Country of origin: United Kingdom
- Original language: English
- No. of series: 4

Production
- Running time: 30 minutes (inc. adverts)
- Production company: WhizzBang TV

Original release
- Network: Bravo
- Release: 2001 – 2004

Related
- When Games Attack

Gamepad is a British television show, that originally aired on Bravo from 2001 to 2004. It is hosted by Violet Berlin.

The show distinguished itself from rival video games shows by professing to be "by gamers, for gamers". Systems covered included Microsoft Windows and Mac OS, the PlayStation 2, GameCube and the Xbox.

It was replaced in 2004 by a new show called When Games Attack. It was hosted by Dominik Diamond, who previously hosted GamesMaster for Channel 4.
