= Hits Radio Black Country & Shropshire =

- Birmingham; United Kingdom
- Broadcast area: Shropshire, Wolverhampton and the Black Country
- Frequencies: FM: 97.2 MHz (Wolverhampton and the Black Country); FM: 103.1 MHz (Shrewsbury and Shropshire; DAB: 11B
- RDS: Hits
- Branding: The Biggest Hits, The Biggest Throwbacks; Across The Black Country and Shropshire

Programming
- Format: CHR/Pop
- Network: Hits Radio

Ownership
- Owner: Bauer Media Audio UK
- Sister stations: Hits Radio Birmingham; Hits Radio Coventry & Warwickshire; Hits Radio Herefordshire & Worcestershire; Greatest Hits Radio Black Country & Shropshire

History
- First air date: April 12, 1976; 50 years ago
- Former names: Beacon Radio (1976–1997) Beacon FM (1997–2005) Beacon Radio (2005–2009) Beacon (2009–2012) Free Radio Black Country & Shropshire (2012–2024)
- Former frequencies: 990 MW 1017 MW

Technical information
- Licensing authority: Ofcom

Links
- Webcast: Rayo
- Website: https://hellorayo.co.uk/hits-radio/shropshire/

Hits Radio Black Country & Shropshire, formerly Free Radio Black Country & Shropshire, is an Independent Local Radio station based in Birmingham, England, owned and operated by Bauer as part of the Hits Radio network. It broadcasts to Shropshire, Wolverhampton and the Black Country.

As of September 2024, the station has a weekly audience of 90,000 listeners according to RAJAR.

== History ==
Beacon Radio's initial logo when it began broadcasting at 303 m (990 kHz) mediumwave and FM 97.2 MHz

Beacon Radio began broadcasting to Wolverhampton and the Black Country from studios at 267 Tettenhall Road in Wolverhampton on mediumwave 303 metres, and 97.2 MHz (from Turner's Hill) at 6 a.m. on 12 April 1976.

The first presenter was Mike Baker and the first song to be played was Eric Carmen's "Sunrise". The station originally set out to broadcast Beautiful Music including soul and country rock with a heavy bias towards American chart music with artists like Linda Ronstadt and The Eagles.

The station's original managing director was Jay Oliver, an American who, with his Programme Controller Allen McKenzie (a Scot/Canadian), was responsible for the Mid-Atlantic sound that flooded the West Midlands for three years (including a US-style jingle package).

As with other UK commercial stations at the time, the station's commitment to news and speech broadcasting under news editor Mike Stewart in its opening year, particularly in the evenings, was extensive; and its late-evening music programmes appeared to offer the presenters a freedom to enlighten, with a wide choice of recordings, as well as to entertain.

The station became successful, although facing competition from the already established commercial station, BRMB in nearby Birmingham. However, the station came in for criticism from the UK licensing authority (then, the Independent Broadcasting Authority) for being too American sounding and not wide-ranging enough in its programming. Due to this, the senior management and output changed in mid-1979.

Its licence was later expanded in July 1987 to cover Shropshire and North East Wales, ostensibly broadcasting from its offices in Shrewsbury on 103.1. Actually, only local news was produced in Shrewsbury, with programmes emanating from the Wolverhampton studios – although entirely separate programming for the two areas was provided during daytime hours (this was from time to time slimmed down or expanded as finances allowed).

Since January 1989, the station has been FM-only, with Beacon's former AM frequencies of 990 and 1017 kHz becoming branded as a separate service "Nice 'n' Easy Radio WABC". WABC stood for Wolverhampton And Black Country, and presumably was not meant to be confused with, or identified with, New York City's WABC (AM), former radio flagship of the American Broadcasting Company, or its one-time sister station, current Disney/ABC Television Network flagship station and New York City production center, WABC-TV Channel 7. Nevertheless, the station used the same musical logo as the New York station in its jingles. The British station was shortened to "Radio WABC" in 1992.

In 1998 the local service essentially closed, and the service was networked (bar afternoon drive time and News bulletins) under the banner of "WABC Classic Gold". This service is currently owned and operated by Bauer Radio as Greatest Hits Radio Black Country & Shropshire.

The company had been reorganised in the late 1990s into "Beacon Broadcasting and Communications Ltd" (BBCL) – a holding company for the company's various activities. In 1995 GWR Group plc bought Beacon Broadcasting Ltd from BBCL (leaving BBCL as a dormant company). The FM licences transferred to GCap Media following the GWR Group's Merger with Capital Radio Group. GWR re-branded the FM service as Beacon FM in 1997, This brought protests to outside the studios in Tettenhall Road, Due to the number of changes made by the then new owner, It reverted to Beacon Radio 1 April 2005. The thinking behind this reversion to the 'radio' title had been floating around for a number of years within the company – new digital radios do not promote a frequency on 'FM' therefore as a 'radio' station it should be branded as such.

On 8 August 2008 it was confirmed that due to competition 'conflict of interests' in the West Midlands (and in other areas), both Beacon Radio stations would be sold by Global Radio, along with other West Midlands owned GCap/Global stations – BRMB, Mercia FM, Wyvern FM and Heart 106. In July 2009, the stations were sold officially to a company backed by Lloyds Development Capital and Phil Riley called Orion Media.

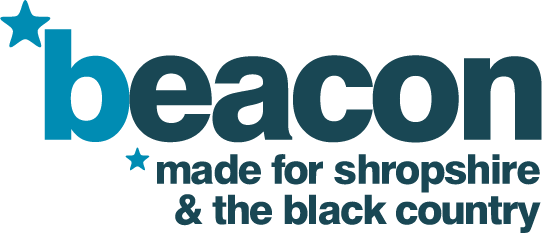
Beacon's last station logo

From Monday 5 July 2010, the two Beacon stations merged to form one station with the loss of separate programming for Shropshire and The Black Country. Separate news and travel bulletins for Shropshire and the Black Country have been retained at peak times alongside advertising.

On 9 January 2012, Orion Media announced that Beacon would be rebranded as Free Radio Shropshire & Black Country, along with its sister West Midlands stations BRMB, Mercia and Wyvern. The Beacon brand was phased out on Wednesday 21 March 2012 in preparation for the rebrand, which took place at 7pm on Monday 26 March 2012. The station's live football commentaries on West Bromwich Albion and Wolverhampton Wanderers matches continued to broadcast on sister station Free Radio 80s on AM and DAB until the end of the 2014–15 season.

In October 2013, the station left its Wolverhampton studios and moved to new smaller studios at Black Country House in nearby Oldbury.

In May 2019, following OFCOM's decision to relax local content obligations from commercial radio, Bauer announced Free Radio's Birmingham breakfast show would be shared with the sister station in Shropshire & Black Country from 8 July 2019, presented by Dan Morrissey. The Oldbury studios were closed and the local weekday drivetime shows were replaced by a single regional show, presented by Andy Goulding.

Regional weekend afternoon shows were axed in favour of additional network programming. As of 2 September 2019, further networked programming replaced the weekday drivetime regional show.

On 23 November 2021, Bauer announced the two Hits at Breakfast shows would be merged into one regional show across all four Free Radio licences, following the departure of Dan Morrissey. The merger was permitted under OFCOM's local content guidelines.

The new Hits at Breakfast show for the West Midlands, presented by John Dalziel and Roisin McCourt, began on Monday 29 November 2021. The Black Country and Shropshire station retains opt-outs for local news, traffic updates and advertising.

=== Hits Radio rebrand ===
On 10 January 2024, station owners Bauer announced Free Radio would be rebranded as Hits Radio Black Country & Shropshire from April 2024, as part of a network-wide relaunch involving 17 local radio stations in England and Wales.

On 20 March 2025, Bauer announced it would end its regional Hits Radio breakfast show for the West Midlands to be replaced by a new national breakfast show for England and Wales on 9 June 2025. Local news and traffic bulletins were retained but the station's Birmingham studios were closed.

The station's final regional programme aired on 6 June 2025.

== Controversy ==
In December 2003, two presenters, Mark Peters and Lisa Freame, left Shropshire's Beacon Radio. On their call-in show, they had asked for opinions on the testimony of the subsequently-convicted murderer Ian Huntley during his trial, despite the matter being sub judice.

== Programming ==
All networked programming originates from Bauer's Manchester studios.

=== News ===
Bauer's newsroom broadcasts local news bulletins hourly from 6am-7pm on weekdays, from 7am-1pm on Saturdays and Sundays. Headlines are broadcast on the half hour during weekday breakfast and drivetime shows, alongside traffic bulletins.

Separate news and traffic bulletins are broadcast for the Black Country and Shropshire areas.

National bulletins from Sky News Radio are carried overnight with bespoke networked bulletins on weekend afternoons, usually originating from Bauer's Leeds newsroom.

== Notable past presenters ==
- Gordon Astley
- Peter Deeley
- Abeer MacIntyre
- Gavin McCoy
- Mike Baker
- Dave Owen
- Davinia Palmer
- Nick Piercey (now at Wave 105 and BBC Radio Oxford)
- Stephen Rhodes (deceased)
- Jo Russell (now at Gem)
- Dale Winton (deceased)
- Kenny Everett (deceased)
- Charlie Wolf
- Sybil Ruscoe
