= Amy Voce =

English radio broadcaster (born 1982)

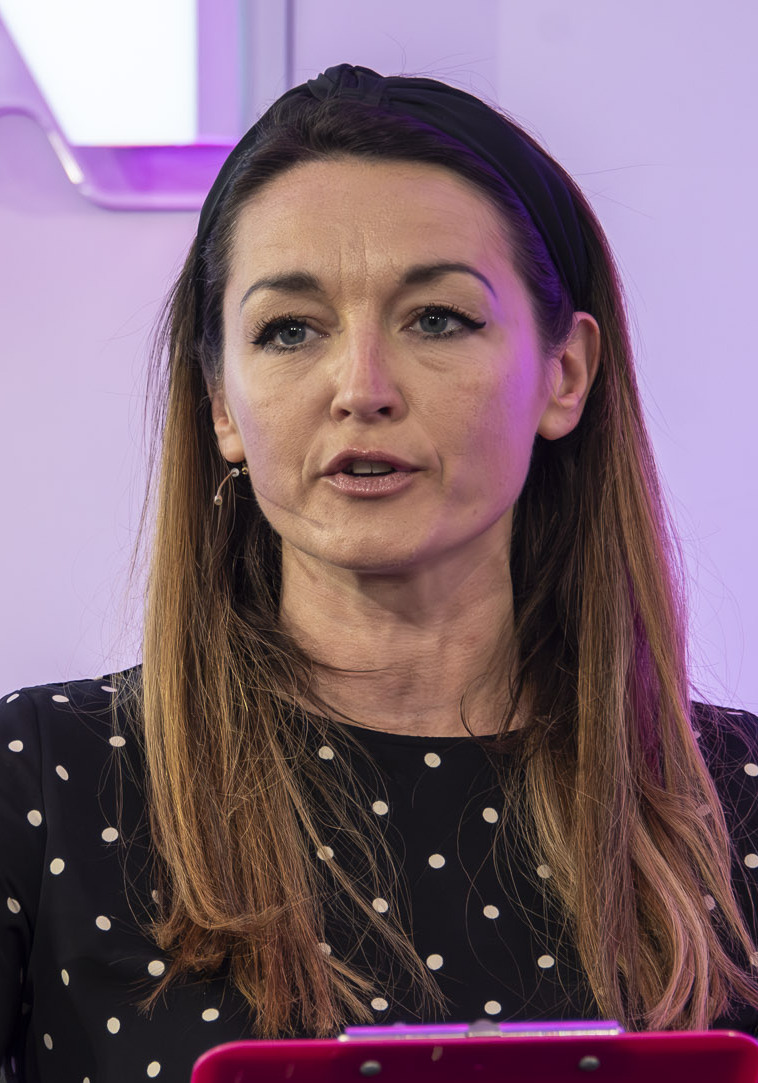
- Voce in 2025
- Born: 19 November 1982 (age 42); England
- Occupation: Radio presenter

Amy Voce is an English broadcaster, formerly of Hits Radio East Midlands (formerly Gem 106) and Virgin Radio UK.

Voce is best known for her on-air work with Sam Pinkham, presenting the Sam and Amy breakfast show on Hits Radio East Midlands (formerly Heart East Midlands and then Gem 106) for eleven years. The programme won two Gold Radio Academy Awards (2013 & 2014), Gold at the 2015 Arqiva Commercial Radio Awards and Silver at the 2016 ARIAS. The duo have also presented cover shows for BBC Radio 2 and Magic.

Originally from Leicester, Voce attended Beauchamp College and Nottingham Trent University, began her radio career as a traffic reporter, before progressing to drivetime and weekend breakfast shows for Heart East Midlands (now Hits Radio East Midlands, known as Gem 106 at the time of her departure alongside Sam in 2017) and in 2006, the flagship weekday breakfast show.

On television, Voce has presented specials for Chilled TV and Now Music TV. From August 2015 to September 2017, the 'Sam and Amy' show for Gem 106 was simulcast live on local television channel Notts TV. Away from broadcasting, Voce is also an events host and has written for publications including Reveal Magazine and Sound Women UK. She also co-presents a podcast, Two Non Blondes, alongside Hits Radio Network presenter Jennie Longdon.

On 29 September 2017, Voce and Pinkham left Gem 106 to join national DAB station Virgin Radio UK to present its weekday breakfast show. When Chris Evans joined Virgin in January 2019, Sam and Amy moved to present separate shows. Sam moved to early breakfast, with Amy moving to a weekday late night slot, coupled with weekend breakfast shows. She then left Virgin Radio in Spring 2024.
