= Virgin Radio UK =

- United Kingdom
- Broadcast area: United Kingdom
- Frequencies: DAB+: 11A Sound Digital; DAB+: 11C Switch Aberdeen; Freesat: 736; Sky (UK only): 0137

Programming
- Language: English
- Format: Hot AC

Ownership
- Owner: News Broadcasting; (News UK)
- Sister stations: Talk; Talksport; Talksport 2; Times Radio; Virgin Radio 80s; Virgin Radio 90s; Virgin Radio Chilled; Virgin Radio Legends

History
- First air date: 30 March 2016

Technical information
- Licensing authority: Ofcom

Links
- Webcast: Radioplayer
- Website: virginradio.co.uk

Virgin Radio UK is a national Hot Adult Contemporary radio station in the United Kingdom that launched on 30 March 2016, owned by News Broadcasting, which is itself a subsidiary of News Corp. It is the second incarnation of Virgin Radio in the UK: the original station launched in 1993 before being rebranded as Absolute Radio in 2008.

As of April 2026, the station has a weekly audience of 1.9 million listeners according to RAJAR.

== History ==
The station launched at 11:00 on 30 March 2016 on a Virgin Trains service from Manchester to London by Edith Bowman and Matt Richardson and the first song played was a live cover version of David Bowie's song "Changes" by Gavin James.

At launch, Virgin Radio UK broadcast to about 75% (now 83%) of the UK population via the Sound Digital DAB ensemble, and also broadcasts via online streaming to computers, mobile device applications and internet radios. It can be received outside the UK via the mobile app and website.

The broadcasts are presented live from 04:00 to 22:00 with overnight shows being automated. The playlist is varied focusing mainly on pop music ranging from the 1980s through to the current day.

On 3 September 2018, Chris Evans announced that from January 2019 he would be moving to Virgin Radio after 13 years of broadcasting on BBC Radio 2. He launched his new breakfast show on 21 January 2019.

On 7 January 2019, Virgin Radio joined the Sky and Freesat satellite platforms.

In January 2021 Graham Norton started a weekend show after 10 years at BBC Radio 2. As with Chris Evans's show, it is distinguished by not having advertisements, due to being wholly sponsored. On 24 February 2024, Norton announced suddenly he was leaving the station, with his final show the following day. From January 2026, the weekend mid-morning slot was taken up permanently by Huey Morgan of Fun Lovin' Criminals, moving to the station having previously presented a show in the same timeslot on Saturdays on BBC Radio 6 Music.

== Sister stations ==
Wireless launched two new Virgin-branded DAB+ spin-off stations on 21 December 2018. Virgin Radio Anthems plays guitar-based classics from the 1980s and 1990s. Virgin Radio Chilled features acoustic singer-songwriters and is designed to unwind and relax. Both stations broadcast The Chris Evans Breakfast Show. When Virgin Anthems launched in December 2018, the station changed its slogan to "The Chris Evans Breakfast Show and Classic Tracks". On 31 March 2025, Virgin Radio Anthems was rebranded as Virgin Radio Legends.

On 30 December 2019, Virgin Radio UK launched a third digital spin-off station – Virgin Radio Groove – on DAB+. It consisted of Motown, soul and disco music and broadcasts The Chris Evans Breakfast Show at breakfast. The station closed in 2022.

In June 2021 a temporary station launched for the LGBTQ+ community, Virgin Radio Pride; It featured many different programmes and documentaries presented by a wide variety of presenters. Virgin Radio Pride returned for further temporary runs in summer of 2022, 2023 and 2024. Whereas the Anthems and Chilled stations broadcast nationally on Sound Digital, Virgin Radio Pride and other pop-ups have typically broadcast on News UK-owned SwitchDigital's DAB multiplexes in London and central-belt Scotland.

On 1 September 2022, the sister station Virgin Radio 80s Plus was launched, which plays the artists of the 1980s, plus the best music from the late 1970s and early 1990s. Virgin Radio 80s Plus can be heard online, on smart speakers across the UK and on DAB in Greater London and the Central Belt of Scotland. It replaced Virgin Radio Groove on DAB radio in London and Scotland (the slot having been used during the summer by that year's run of Virgin Radio Pride). On 17 September 2025, Virgin Radio 80s Plus was rebranded as Virgin Radio 80s.

In November 2023, an online-only pop-up station marking Diwali was run.

In February 2025, a new Virgin Radio sibling station launched as a DAB+ station in the London area. Virgin Radio Britpop was launched to mark the 30th anniversary of a number of key moments in the Britpop movement, such as the 'Battle of Britpop' chart race between Blur and Oasis, and the latter group's impending reunion gigs. Although initially thought to be temporary, the Britpop station remained on air up to and beyond the end of 2025. In a February 2026 news release announcing the network's RAJAR results, News UK revealed plans to 'officially' launch a Virgin Radio 90s station; which launched on 9 March and absorbed the existing Britpop station.

== Presenters ==
=== Current presenters ===
- Steve Denyer
- Chris Evans
- Emma B
- Ben Jones
- Geoff Lloyd
- Goldierocks
- Huey Morgan
- Charlie Baker
- Alex James
- John Power
- Tim Burgess
- Ana Matronic
- Tim Cocker
- Stu Elmore
- James Merritt

=== Former presenters ===
- Bam
- Edith Bowman
- Jamie East
- Jon Holmes
- Russell Kane
- Kate Lawler
- Iain Lee
- Maria McErlane
- Pete Mitchell
- Graham Norton
- Sam Pinkham
- Matt Richardson
- Gaby Roslin
- Eddy Temple-Morris
- Inel Tomlinson
- Amy Voce
- Ricky Wilson
- Leigh Francis
- Dick and Dom
- Tom Allen
- Jayne Middlemiss
- Ryan Tubridy
- Angela Scanlon
