= Phil Riley =

British radio presenter and executive

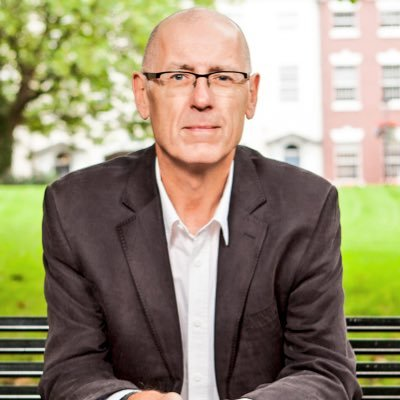
- Born: Warwickshire
- Occupations: Radio presenter, radio executive

Phil Riley is an English radio presenter and executive. He was the chief executive of Chrysalis Radio from June 1999 to July 2007, having played a major role in establishing Chrysalis Radio as one of the leading new entrants in the UK radio industry. He resigned his post after leading the sale of Chrysalis Radio to private company Global Radio in July 2007. He later owned Orion Media, before selling it in May 2016. In 2021, he co-founded Boom Radio. He is a Fellow of The Radio Academy.

== Career ==
Riley's radio career started in 1980, when he joined Birmingham's BRMB as a graduate trainee. In 1990, he was appointed Managing Director of 96.3 Radio Aire in Leeds, where he was responsible for the launch of Magic 828, the original Magic station. He left in 1994 to join the newly formed Chrysalis Radio as Managing Director of its first station, Heart 100.7 in Birmingham – a role he reprised the following year for sister-station Heart 106.2 in London.

Riley was active in the development of digital radio, sitting on the board of the Digital Radio Development Bureau (DRDB), as well as chairing multiplex consortium MXR (in which Chrysalis was the lead shareholder). On a wider industry level, Riley held main board memberships of The Radio Centre (formerly the CRCA and RAB) for over ten years. He also sat on the Rajar Board. Riley has an MBA (specialising in Marketing) from Columbia Business School.

He advised media company boards on strategy matters, and at the end of 2007 was named Executive Chairman of a bid for EMAP Radio, backed by Private Equity group Vitruvian Partners.

In May 2009, Riley purchased BRMB, Mercia, Wyvern, Beacon in the West Midlands and Gem 106 in the East Midlands from Global Radio for a sale price worth £37.5 million. In January 2012, Riley announced that all these stations apart from Gem 106 would be rebranded as "Free Radio" in order to give Orion better marketing opportunities. On Thursday, 3 July 2014, Riley received a Special Award at the Arqiva Commercial Radio Awards.

In May 2016, Riley sold Orion Media to Bauer Media for a reported £50m.

When Bauer acquired a number of radio groups in February 2019, they were placed into a hold separate while the Competition and Markets Authority investigated the deal. Riley was employed as an independent director to support the management teams of the acquired companies.

Outside of his work for Bauer, Riley established Podcast Live, a business that arranges live events for the podcast sector.

In 2021, Riley co-founded Boom Radio, which launched on Sunday 14 February 2021.
