= Hits Radio Coventry & Warwickshire =

English independent radio station

- Birmingham; United Kingdom
- Broadcast area: Coventry, Solihull and Warwickshire
- Frequencies: FM: (97.0 MHz; 102.9) MHz; DAB: 12D
- RDS: Hits
- Branding: The Biggest Hits, The Biggest Throwbacks; Across Coventry and Warwickshire

Programming
- Format: CHR/Pop
- Network: Hits Radio

Ownership
- Owner: Bauer Media Audio UK
- Sister stations: Hits Radio Birmingham; Hits Radio Herefordshire & Worcestershire; Hits Radio Black Country & Shropshire; Greatest Hits Radio Coventry & Warwickshire

History
- First air date: 23 May 1980 (43 years ago)
- Former names: Mercia Sound; Mercia FM; Mercia; Free Radio Coventry & Warwickshire
- Former frequencies: FM: 95.9 MHz; AM: 1359 kHz

Technical information
- Licensing authority: Ofcom

Links
- Website: Free C&W

Hits Radio Coventry & Warwickshire, formerly Free Radio Coventry & Warwickshire, is an Independent Local Radio station based in Birmingham, England, owned and operated by Bauer as part of the Hits Radio network. It broadcasts to Coventry and Warwickshire.

As of September 2024, the station has a weekly audience of 107,000 listeners according to RAJAR.

== History ==
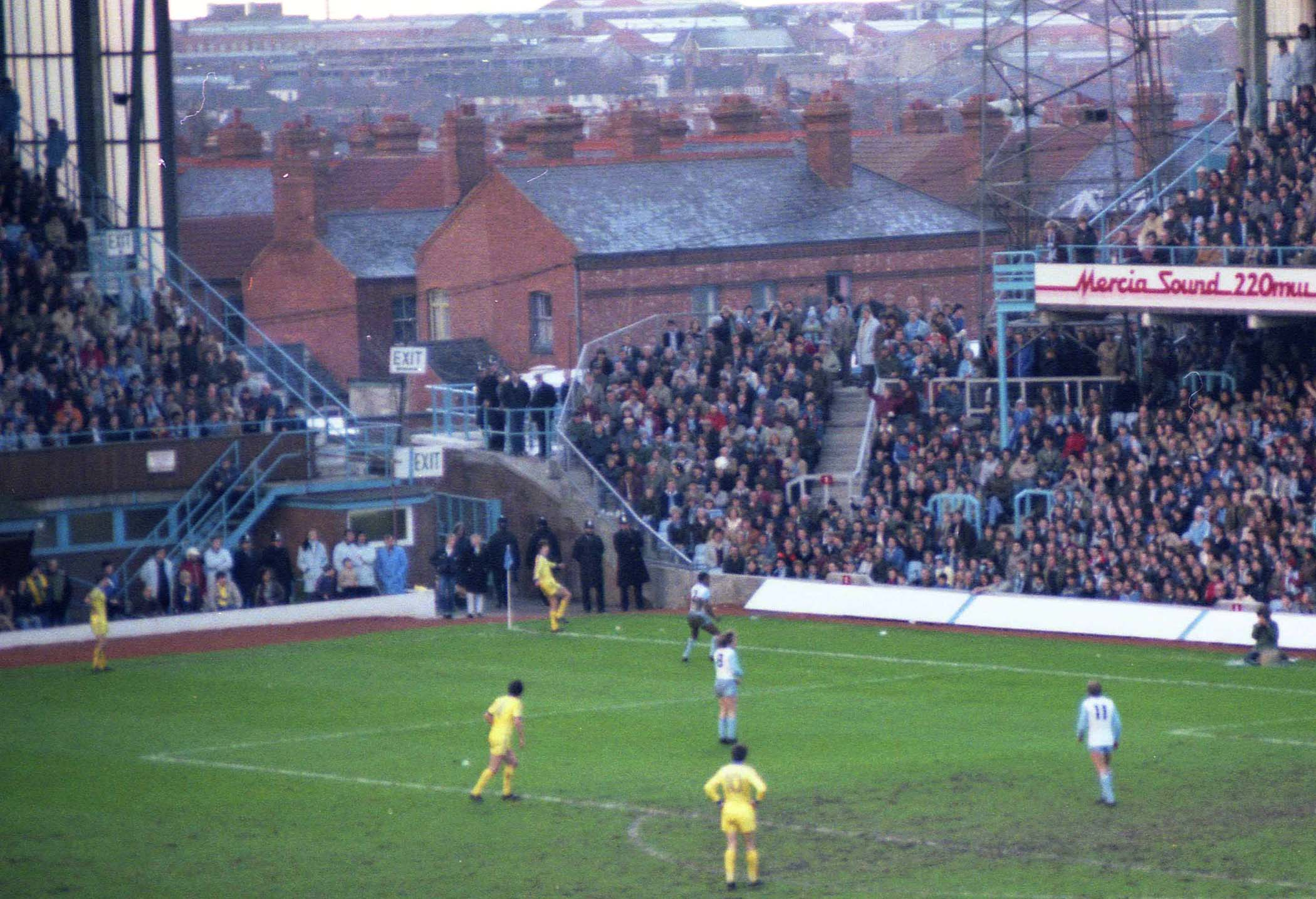
An advert for Mercia Sound at Highfield Road, Coventry in 1982

The station began broadcasting as Mercia Sound at 7 am on 23 May 1980, with an opening announcement by Programme Director Ian Rufus, followed by breakfast presenter Gordon Astley and a news bulletin read by Mike Henfield.

In 1987, the station moved FM frequencies, along with most ILR stations at the time to 97.0 FM. Shortly after this, a new transmitter on 102.9 FM was created to serve South Warwickshire.

In 1989, along with BRMB in Birmingham, the AM frequency was split from the FM transmissions to create a new radio station called Xtra AM which played music from the 1960s and 1970s.

In 1993, the station's owners, Midlands Radio, sold the station to Capital Radio who, shortly afterwards, sold it to GWR Group, who re-branded it in-line with their "Today's Best Mix" slogan from 1994 onwards. During this period numerous presenters from other GWR stations joined Mercia, including Craig Strong (Trent FM, Ram FM, Leicester Sound), Tim Gough (Trent FM, dead in 2022), Adrian Eyre (Trent FM, Ram FM), Rachael Hopper (Ram FM) and Sean Goldsmith (Trent FM). From 2002 onwards, the slogan was "Playing the best mix of the 80's, 90's and today". In 2007, it reverted to the old slogan of "Today's Best Mix".

On 8 August 2008, it was confirmed that due to competition 'conflict of interests' in the West Midlands (and in other areas), Mercia would be sold by Global Radio, along with other West Midlands owned GCap/Global stations BRMB, Wyvern FM, Heart 106 and Beacon Radio. In July 2009, the station was sold officially to a company, backed by Lloyds Development Capital and Phil Riley, called Orion Media.

At this time, seven hours of local programming were broadcast each weekday with four hours on weekend afternoons and a regional daytime programme on weekdays.

On 8 July 2011, Orion Media announced plans to close Mercia's studios at Hertford Place in Coventry and co-locate the station to the company's headquarters in Birmingham – the move took place two months later and the Hertford Place studios were transferred to community radio station Radio Plus.

On 9 January 2012, Orion Media announced that Mercia would be rebranded as Free Radio Coventry & Warwickshire from April 2012, along with its sister West Midlands stations Beacon, BRMB, and Wyvern. The Mercia brand was phased out on Wednesday, 21 March 2012, in preparation for the rebrand, which took place at 7 pm on Monday, 26 March 2012.

On 6 May 2016, the station's owners, Orion, announced they had been bought by Bauer for an undisclosed fee, reportedly between £40 and £50 million.

In May 2019, following Ofcom's decision to relax local content obligations from commercial radio, Bauer announced Free Radio's Coventry & Warwickshire breakfast show would be shared with the sister station in Herefordshire and Worcestershire from 8 July 2019, presented by John Dalziel and Roisin McCourt. The localised weekday drivetime shows were initially replaced by a single regional show, presented by Andy Goulding.

Regional weekend afternoon shows were axed in favour of additional network programming. As of 2 September 2019, further networked output replaced the weekday drivetime show.

On 23 November 2021, Bauer announced the station's Hits at Breakfast show, presented by John Dalziel and Roisin McCourt, would broadcast across all four Free Radio licences.

The move was permitted under Ofcom's local content guidelines. The Coventry and Warwickshire station retains opt-outs for local news, traffic updates, and advertising.

=== Hits Radio rebrand ===
On 10 January 2024, station owners Bauer announced Free Radio would be rebranded as Hits Radio Coventry and Warwickshire from 17 April 2024, as part of a network-wide relaunch involving 17 local radio stations in England and Wales.

On 20 March 2025, Bauer announced it would end its regional Hits Radio breakfast show for the West Midlands to be replaced by a new national breakfast show for England and Wales on 9 June 2025. Local news and traffic bulletins were retained but the station's Birmingham studios were closed.

The station's final regional programme aired on 6 June 2025.

== Programming ==
Hits Radio network programming is broadcast and produced from Bauer’s London headquarters or studios in Manchester & occasionally Newcastle.

=== News ===
Hits Radio Coventry and Warwickshire broadcasts local news bulletins hourly from 6 am–7 pm on weekdays, from 7 am–1 pm on Saturdays and Sundays. Headlines are broadcast on the half-hour during weekday breakfast and drivetime shows, alongside traffic bulletins.

National bulletins from Sky News Radio are carried overnight with bespoke networked bulletins on weekend afternoons, usually originating from the Hits Radio Leeds newsroom.
