= Hits Radio Herefordshire & Worcestershire =

Coordinates: 52.2169°N 2.2158°W

- Birmingham; United Kingdom
- Broadcast area: Herefordshire and Worcestershire
- Frequencies: FM: 96.7 (Kidderminster); FM: 97.6 (Hereford); FM: 102.8 (Worcester)
- RDS: Hits
- Branding: The Biggest Hits, The Biggest Throwbacks; Across Herefordshire and Worcestershire

Programming
- Format: CHR
- Network: Hits Radio

Ownership
- Owner: Bauer
- Sister stations: Hits Radio Birmingham; Hits Radio Coventry & Warwickshire; Hits Radio Black Country & Shropshire; Greatest Hits Radio Herefordshire & Worcestershire

History
- First air date: 4 October 1982; 44 years ago
- Former names: Radio Wyvern; Wyvern FM; Wyvern; Free Radio Herefordshire & Worcestershire
- Former frequencies: AM: 954 kHz; 1530 kHz

Links
- Website: Free H&W

Hits Radio Herefordshire & Worcestershire, formerly Free Radio Herefordshire & Worcestershire, is an Independent Local Radio station owned and operated by Bauer as part of the Hits Radio network. It broadcasts to Herefordshire and Worcestershire.

As of September 2024, the station has a weekly audience of 79,000 listeners according to RAJAR.

== History ==
Radio Wyvern originally went on-air on 4 October 1982. The original Wyvern name derived from the River Wye and River Severn, the rivers running through Hereford and Worcester respectively (the name was proposed in the 1970s for what would become the county of Hereford and Worcester). The initial presentation team consisted of Sammy Southall at Breakfast, Roy Leonard in the morning, Graham Hughes in the afternoon and rock shows, and Mike George at drivetime. Weekend presenters included Jeff Roberts, Rob Yarnold and Bob Lee. The managing director from 1984 until 1996 was Norman Bilton, who joined Wyvern from Two Counties Radio in Bournemouth and Metro Radio in Newcastle.

The offices and studios were located in the former Hereford and Worcester County Council Education Department building at 5/6 Barbourne Terrace, north of Worcester city centre. The studio block was newly constructed at the rear of the main building, incorporating two identical on-air self-operated studios, using MBI desks, surrounding a central 'talks' studio. In accordance with the then IBA Code of Engineering Practice, the entrance to each studio was through a two-door "air-lock", ensuring high acoustic isolation. EMT 948 turntables, Studer B67 tape decks and Sonifex Micro-HS cartridge machines were used in these studios. From the first day, a split-transmission system for commercial breaks was provided (to play separate advertising breaks to Worcestershire and to Herefordshire), using secondary cue-tones to fire sequences of cartridges, but this was rarely, if ever, used on air. The news was broadcast from one of the 'guest' microphone positions in the on-air studio, operated by the presenter, not the newsreader. Other voice reports for news, or telephone interviews, were carried out in a "meat safe" style studio inside the newsroom. The Technical Director in charge of all equipment was Rob Yarnold.

In its early days, the station opened at 6 am (7 am on Sundays) and closed at 8 pm, before it extended broadcasting hours to 24 hours a day by joining up with Beacon Radio from 10 pm and then a wider network of Midlands stations from 1 am. Radio Wyvern took the Superstation overnight service in the late 1980s, and when that closed abruptly, a local Late Show was introduced, with the overnight output from 1 am shared with BRMB and Mercia FM.

The station has played host to many well-known broadcasters over the years. Jane Garvey, who was the launch presenter for BBC Radio 5 Live and later one of the key presenters for Woman's Hour, held her first professional radio job here, assisting the presentation department and reading sports news on air. Neil Fox began his professional broadcasting career here in 1984, and the line Wyvern News, this is Howard Hughes became very familiar to listeners. Rich Edwards, who joined in the very early days, presented on Classic Hits until its abrupt closure in 2007. David Holdsworth, now with the BBC, was the station's News Editor, and Eleanor Oldroyd, now with BBC Radio 5 Live, was a member of the Sport team. Several of the original presenters including Mike George, Graham Hughes, and Roy Leonard went on to long careers with BBC radio and television.

The station split into Wyvern FM on 5 February 1996, playing newer music, and Wyvern AM (Quality and Variety), which was essentially a gold service, with both services initially simulcasting from 7 pm to 6 am. The AM station was rebranded as Classic Gold soon afterwards, and was sold to Murfin Music International because of ownership regulations and the large overlap with neighbouring Classic Gold 774 in Gloucestershire. Some time later, it was rebranded as Classic Hits, and by this time a fully-fledged local service, with no links to Wyvern FM or the Classic Gold network. In 2007, Laser Broadcasting abruptly relaunched the AM station as Sunshine Radio.

In 1997, Wyvern was acquired by GWR and later, Global Radio, who moved the station to new studios at Kirkham House in the Perdiswell Park area of Worcester. On 8 August 2008, it was confirmed that due to competition 'conflict of interests' in the West Midlands (and in other areas), Wyvern FM would be sold by Global Radio, along with other West Midlands owned GCap/Global stations BRMB, Mercia FM, Heart 106, and Beacon Radio. In July 2009, the station was sold officially to a company backed by Lloyds Development Capital and Phil Riley called Orion Media. Following the take over in January 2010, Wyvern FM rebranded as Wyvern and launched a new station slogan, "Made for Herefordshire & Worcestershire".

In 2012, Wyvern rebranded as Free Herefordshire and Worcestershire. Local programming was retained at breakfast and weekday drivetime. The Wyvern brand was phased out on 21 March 2012 in preparation for the rebrand, which took place at 7 pm on Monday 26 March 2012.

In May 2016, the station's owners, Orion, were bought by Bauer for an undisclosed fee, reportedly between £40 and £50 million.

In 2019, following OFCOM's decision to relax local content obligations from commercial radio, Bauer ceased local programming and closed the studios in Worcester. The breakfast show was shared with the sister station Free Coventry & Warwickshire from 8 July 2019, presented by John Dalziel and Roisin McCourt. This later extended across all four Free Radio licences in November 2021. The move was permitted under OFCOM's local content guidelines. The Herefordshire and Worcestershire station retains opt-outs for local news, traffic updates and advertising.

The localised weekday drivetime shows were initially replaced by a single regional show, presented by Andy Goulding. Regional weekend afternoon shows were axed in favour of additional network programming. As of 2 September 2019, further networked output replaced the weekday drivetime show.

=== Hits Radio rebrand ===
In April 2024, Bauer rebranded Free Radio as Hits Radio, as part of a network-wide relaunch involving 17 local radio stations in England and Wales.

In June 2025, the regional Hits Radio breakfast show for the West Midlands was replaced by a new national breakfast show for England and Wales. Local news and traffic bulletins were retained but the station's Birmingham studios were closed. The station's final regional programme aired on 6 June 2025.

== Programming ==
Hits Radio network programming is broadcast and produced from Bauer's London headquarters or studios in Manchester and occasionally Newcastle.

=== News ===
Hits Radio Herefordshire and Worcestershire broadcasts local news bulletins hourly from 6am-7pm on weekdays, from 7am-1pm on Saturdays and Sundays. Headlines are broadcast on the half-hour during weekday breakfast and drivetime shows, alongside traffic bulletins.

National bulletins from Sky News Radio are carried overnight with bespoke networked bulletins on weekend afternoons, usually originating from the Hits Radio Leeds newsroom.

== Notable past presenters ==
- Jane Garvey (now at Times Radio)
- Elliott Webb (now at BBC Hereford & Worcester)
- Robin Banks (now runs Robin Banks Consultancy and Coaching)
- Davinia Palmer
- Neil Fox (now at Nation Radio London)
- Richard Clarke (now at Heart South)
- Mike George (later at BBC Hereford & Worcester and BBC Radio Shropshire, now retired)
- Sam and Mark (now at CBBC)
