= Lloyds Development Capital =

London-based private equity house

Lloyds Development Capital LDC (Managers) Ltd.
- Company type: Subsidiary
- Industry: Commercial banking
- Founded: 1981; 45 years ago
- Headquarters: London, England, UK
- Area served: United Kingdom
- Products: Private equity
- Parent: Lloyds Banking Group
- Website: www.ldc.co.uk

Lloyds Development Capital (Holdings) Limited (LDC), is a mid-market private equity house and subsidiary of Lloyds Banking Group, established in 1981 as Lloyds Development Capital Limited. From 1999 to 2011, it was known as Lloyds TSB Development Capital Limited.

== Operations ==
In 1991, investment exceeded £30 million for the first time and in, 2001, LDC completed its 300th investment. By 2007, investment exceeded £300 million and it completed its 400th investment.

The company operates through the following UK subsidiaries, of which it has an interest in 100% of the issued share capital:

Company	Formerly	Principal activity
LDC (Managers) Limited	Lloyds TSB Venture Managers Limited	Venture capital fund manager
LDC (General Partner) Limited	Lloyds TSB Ventures General Partner Limited	General partner in venture capital funds
LDC Ventures Trustees Limited	Lloyds TSB Ventures Trustees Limited	Trustee of exempt unit trusts
LDC Ventures Carry Limited	Lloyds TSB Ventures Carry Limited	Limited partner in a venture capital fund
LDC (Nominees) Limited	Lloyds TSB Development Capital (Projects) Limited	Nominee company
LDC Parallel (Nominees) Limited	Lloyds TSB Ventures Nominees Limited	Nominee company

A subsidiary not registered in the United Kingdom, LDC (Asia) Limited, located in Hong Kong, was liquidated in 2015.

In 2016, LDC supported the inaugural London Evening Standard Business Awards and the SME Business of the Year category.

== Assets ==
- NEC Group
- UK2 Group

== See also ==
- Lloyds Associated Banking Company
- Agricultural Mortgage Corporation
