= Timeline of Classic FM =

A timeline of notable events relating to Classic FM, a British national radio station which began broadcasting in September 1992.

== 1990s ==
- 1990
  - The Broadcasting Act 1990 paves the way for the launch of Independent National Radio (INR) stations in the United Kingdom. with the Radio Authority being mandated to award three INR licences, awarding each licence to the highest cash bidder, providing that the applicant meets criteria set down in the Broadcasting Act.
- 1991
  - January – The first of the three INR licences is advertised. It will be the only FM licence, and is for a "non-pop music service."
  - July – The Radio Authority awards the first Independent National Radio licence to the highest cash bidder of the three applicants, Showtime Radio, which proposes a 'songs from the shows' format.
  - August – Showtime Radio is not able to secure the required funding within the required time as stipulated by the Radio Authority and the offer of the licence to Showtime is withdrawn.
  - 30 September – The Radio Authority reawards the first Independent National Radio licence to the second highest bidder, Classic FM.
- 1992
  - July – Ahead of the station's launch, test transmissions are carried out using a recording of birdsong originally made for a Raymond Briggs play about nuclear war in 1991. The recording proves popular with listeners and is later launched as Birdsong Radio.
  - 7 September – Classic FM launches at 6am. Nick Bailey presents the first programme. Zadok the Priest by George Frideric Handel is the first piece to be played.
  - 12 September – As part of its launch schedule, the first edition of The Classic FM Chart is broadcast. Airing for three hours on Saturday mornings, the programme's host is Paul Gambaccini.
- 1993
  - No events.
- 1994
  - Petroc Trelawny leaves and Jamie Crick joins.
  - 2 April – The first edition of Classic Gardening Forum is aired. It features experts which had made up the panel on BBC Radio 4's Gardeners' Question Time who had been dismissed by the BBC when the programme's production was transferred to an independent production company.
- 1995
  - Paul Gambaccini leaves for a while to join BBC Radio 3, having presented the station's weekly chart show since its launch.
- 1996
  - 18 March – Mike Read joins, and replaces Nick Bailey as host of Classic FM's breakfast show.
  - 5–8 April – Classic FM broadcasts its first Hall of Fame over the Easter weekend.
  - GWR takes full control of Classic FM.
  - Anne-Marie Minhall joins, initially as a newsreader before becoming a presenter.
  - A number of new transmitters are switched on in the second half of the year and the start of 1997 to extend Classic FM's reach by 2.2 million listeners.
  - Classic FM Requests and Smooth Classics launch.
- 1997
  - Paul Gambaccini rejoins, and Simon Bates joins.
- 1998
  - No events.
- 1999
  - 1 May – Mike Read leaves, and Natalie Wheen joins the station to replace Margaret Howard.
  - 14 May – The final Lunchtime Concerto, which had aired on weekdays at 2pm since the station’s launch is broadcast, ahead of a schedule refresh which includes the launch the next day of a new nightly magazine slot Tonight at Eleven.
  - 15 November – Classic FM starts broadcasting on DAB digital radio following the launch of the UK's first national commercial multiplex Digital One.

== 2000s ==
- 2000
  - Rob Cowan leaves the station for a while to join BBC Radio 3.
- 2001
  - November – Classic FM enters into a partnership with the Royal Liverpool Philharmonic orchestra. It was to be the first of many partnerships with orchestras, choirs and musical educational providers across the UK.
  - 25 December – The Nation's Favourite Christmas Carol is revealed for the first time.
- 2002
  - Simon Bates becomes the drivetime show presenter.
  - Paul Gambaccini leaves.
  - 26 November – Classic FM TV launches.
- 2003
  - 5 January – Mark Goodier joins the station to present Classic FM's chart show.
  - 9 June – Simon Bates replaces Henry Kelly as the station's weekday breakfast show presenter.
- 2004
  - Joby Talbot becomes Classic FM's first composer in residence.
- 2005
  - 17 January – Classic FM joins all other UK commercial radio stations to broadcast UK Radio Aid. This would be the first and only time in the station's history that it would broadcast other music genres such as pop and rock, rather than classical music.
- 2006
  - February – Myleene Klass joins, replacing Aled Jones as host of the Sunday breakfast show.
  - 26 March – Classic FM begins broadcasting from new studios on the second floor of 30 Leicester Square, central London.
  - The Classic FM Foundation charity is formed.
  - Patrick Hawes replaces Joby Talbot as Classic FM's composer in residence.
  - Henry Kelly rejoins the station to host the Sunday mid-morning show.
- 2007
  - 4 August – Former Blur bassist Alex James joins the station to present a three-part series, and the following year he starts to present a 100-part series called The A to Z of Classical Music.
  - 14 December – Classic FM TV closes on TV and becomes online only.
- 2008
  - February – Classic FM announces a major shake-up of the schedule, which will be rolled out in two parts – weekdays in late February and weekends a month later. Laurence Llewelyn-Bowen and Margherita Taylor join as part of the revamp.
  - April to September – Following the closure of sister station theJazz, Classic FM broadcasts a nightly two-hour late night jazz programme.
  - May – Howard Goodall becomes Classic FM's third composer in residence.
  - 31 October – Global becomes the owner of Classic FM following its purchase of previous owners GCap Media.
  - Katie Breathwick joins to become the breakfast show newsreader.
- 2009
  - Henry Kelly leaves the station for the second time.

== 2010s ==
- 2010
  - July – John Suchet joins the station to host the Sunday lunchtime show.
  - Simon Bates moves from breakfast to mid-mornings.
- 2011
  - January – John Suchet replaces Simon Bates as host of the station's weekday mid-morning show. as Simon leaves the station to join Smooth Radio.
  - 8 January – Nicholas Owen joins the station to host the Saturday lunchtime show.
- 2012
  - 7 January – Alan Titchmarsh joins the station to present a new Saturday morning programme.
  - 29 June – Tim Lihoreau replaces Mark Forrest as host of the weekday breakfast show with Jane Jones taking over the weekend breakfast show and John Brunning replacing Mark as presenter of the weekly chart show.
  - Natalie Wheen leaves.
- 2013
  - 4 February – Aled Jones joins the station present a Sunday morning programme from March.
  - 31 March – The Archbishop of Canterbury Justin Welby presents a two-hour special Easter Sunday breakfast programme on Classic FM.
  - 7 April – Former BBC Radio 4 newsreader Charlotte Green joins the station to host a weekly Sunday afternoon programme, Charlotte Green's Great Composers. and from 22 September, she also hosts the first edition of a new magazine-style arts series called ‘’Charlotte Green's Culture Club’’.
  - June – Katherine Jenkins joins.
  - October – Catherine Bott joins the station to present a three-year project covering the entire history of classical music.
- 2014
  - 29 January – John Suchet opens The Classic FM Foundation Lecture Room at the headquarters of London-based music therapy charity Nordoff Robbins.
  - 5 February – Classic FM begins broadcasting on digital terrestrial television.
  - 15 April – Classic FM dedicates an entire 24 hours of its music to the recordings of Sir Neville Marriner to celebrate his 90th birthday.
  - September – Jamie Crick leaves the station after 20 years of broadcasting. Anne-Marie Minhall replaces him as host of the station's weekday afternoon programme.
  - December – Howard Goodall leaves after six years of broadcasting.
- 2015
  - 7 March – Andrew Collins joins, and replaces Howard Goodall as presenter of Saturday Night at the Movies. Howard had left the show at the end of last year and Tommy Pearson had presented the show on an interim basis.
  - 8 July – Debbie Wiseman is appointed as Classic FM's latest composer in residence. She replaces Howard Goodall who had held the role until the end of 2014.
  - Katie Breathwick becomes the host of the overnight show at weekends. She had previously been the breakfast show newsreader.
- 2016
  - 9 April – Bill Turnbull joins the station to present the station's weekend morning shows.
  - Sam Pittis joins.
- 2017
  - April – The series High Score dedicated to video game music is first broadcast on Classic FM. Its first series became "the most popular programme on ‘Listen Again’ in Classic FM's 25-year history".
  - September
    - Nick Bailey, who launched Classic FM 25 years earlier, leaves. His most recent presenting slot had been the weeknight overnight show.
    - As part of a week of programmes marking the station's 25th birthday, Classic FM broadcasts a play detailing the creation of the station called “The Pazza Factor: the story of the birth of Classic FM.
  - December – Alex James and Charlotte Green leave.
- 2018
  - 6 January – Rob Cowan rejoins the station to present a Saturday evening programme.
  - 7 January – Charlotte Hawkins replaces Charlotte Green as host of the Sunday afternoon programme.
  - 5 November – Pet Classics is broadcast on Classic FM for the first time. The programme features soothing music to calm listeners' pets on Bonfire Night. Pet Classics has now become an annual programme.
- 2019
  - February – Moira Stuart joins, and becomes the station's weekday morning newsreader and later in July, she begins presenting the Saturday afternoon programme for the station.
  - 21 December – The Classic FM Chart is broadcast for the final time. Classic FM had broadcast a weekly chart show since the station's launch.

== 2020s ==
- 2020
  - 5 January – John Humphrys joins, to present a new Sunday afternoon show.
  - 29 May – As part of a schedule shake-up, John Suchet leaves the mid-morning show after more than nine years to host the evening concert programme. He is replaced on mid-mornings by Alexander Armstrong.
  - 9 August – Moira Stuart presents the first edition of a new Sunday evening series, Moira Stuart Meets….
  - 31 December – Jane Jones leaves after 28 years working at the station.
- 2021
  - 17 October – Bill Turnbull hosts his final show after five years at the station.
- 2022
  - 1 July
    - John Suchet presents his final daily show after twelve years with the station. He will continue to present occasional special programmes for the station.
    - The final Classic FM Concert is broadcast. The two-hour programme, which played works in full, had been broadcast on weekday evenings since the station's first day on air.
  - 4 July – Smooth Classics is now broadcast in a continuous six-hour block on weekdays, from 7pm to 1am, replacing the Classic FM Concert. Zeb Soanes joins to present the first three hours.
- 2023
  - 8 January – Andrew Marr joins to present a Sunday morning programme.
  - 4 March – Andrew Collins presents his final edition of Saturday Night at the Movies for Classic FM, having announced the previous day his intention to leave after seven years.
  - 11 March – Jonathan Ross succeeds Andrew Collins as presenter of Classic FM's Saturday Night at the Movies.
  - 14 April – John Brunning presents Classic FM's More Music Drive for the final time.
  - 17 April – Schedule changes see Margherita Taylor replacing John Brunning, and Ritula Shah joins from BBC Radio 4 to present a new show, Calm Classics on weekday nights from 10pm.
  - 2 July – Former BBC News presenter Joanna Gosling joins to present a Sunday afternoon show. She replaces Catherine Bott who ended regular broadcasts on the station the previous Sunday.
- 2024
  - 2 January – Classic FM switches from broadcasting on DAB to DAB+ in order to improve the sound quality of its output.
  - 5 January
    - Tim Lihoreau presents Classic FM's More Music Breakfast for the final time.
    - From that day, Classic FM broadcasts two weekly film music programmes with Jonathan Ross’s movie music show airing on Friday evenings as well as on Saturday.
  - 6 January – Tim Lihoreau takes over the weekend breakfast show and Alan Titchmarsh moves to Saturday afternoons, replacing Moira Stuart.
  - 7 January – Stephen Mangan joins to host on Sunday afternoon’s replacing John Humphrys who moves to a new Saturday night one-hour programme Connecting Notes’ which replaces David Mellor who is set to return on an ad-hoc basis from Easter with a programme celebrating landmark live recordings.
  - 8 January – Dan Walker takes over as weekday breakfast presenter, with the programme moving to a new slot – 6:30am to 10am.
  - 8 February – Nearly 15 years after launching on DAB, Classic FM finally becomes available via digital radio in the Channel Islands.
  - 12 September – Global launches two Classic FM sister stations - Classic FM Calm and Classic FM Movies. Both are available on digital multiplexes in London.
- 2025
  - No events
- 2026
  - 29 May – Alexander Armstrong presents his final weekday morning show, having been the presenter of this slot for the past six years. He remains at Classic FM, presenting a new Friday night programme called Classical Spotlight.
  - 1 June – Aled Jones begins presenting weekday mid-mornings on Classic FM as part of a schedule refresh for the station.
  - 16 October – Classic FM launches its first pop-up Christmas music station, Classic FM Christmas. Playing non-stop Christmas music, the pop-up launches ten weeks to the day before Christmas Day.
