= Capital Midlands =

UK regional radio station

Coordinates: 52°28′36″N 1°54′50″W

- Birmingham; United Kingdom
- Frequencies: FM: Birmingham: 102.2 MHz (Kings Norton, Sandwell, Black Country and Birmingham) East Midlands: 102.8 MHz (Matlock, Bakewell and Derby); 96.5 MHz (Mansfield); 96.2 MHz (Newark-on-Trent, Nottingham and Notts); 105.4 MHz (Leicester) DAB: 10B (Derby); 11B (Wolverhampton & Shropshire); 11B (Leicester); 11C (Birmingham); 12C (Nottingham)
- RDS: Capital

Programming
- Format: Contemporary hit radio
- Network: Capital

Ownership
- Owner: Global

History
- First air date: 6 April 2019

Links
- Website: Capital Birmingham; Capital East Midlands

Capital Midlands is a regional radio station owned and operated by Global as part of the Capital network. It broadcasts to Birmingham, parts of the Black Country and the East Midlands from studios at Brindleyplace in Birmingham City Centre.

The station launched in April 2019 as a result of a merger between Capital Birmingham and Capital East Midlands.

== Overview ==
The regional station originally broadcast as four separate stations.

- Choice FM began broadcasting in Birmingham on 1 January 1995, after taking over the licence previously held by Buzz FM. It was relaunched as Galaxy in 1999 and Capital Birmingham in January 2011.
- Radio Trent in Nottinghamshire, Leicester Sound in Leicestershire and Ram FM in Derbyshire operated three separate localised services before they were merged and rebranded as part of the Capital network in January 2011.

On 26 February 2019, Global confirmed the two Capital stations would be merged, following Ofcom's decision to relax local content obligations from commercial radio.

As of April 2019, regional output consists of a three-hour Drivetime show from Birmingham on weekdays, alongside localised news bulletins, traffic updates and advertising for the East and West Midlands.

The station retains studios in Birmingham and regional offices in Nottingham.

== Programming ==
All programming is broadcast and produced from Global's London headquarters.

Global's newsroom broadcasts hourly localised news updates from 6am-6pm on weekdays and 8am-12pm at weekends.
