= Capital East Midlands =

Radio station in Nottingham, England

- Nottingham; England
- Broadcast area: East Midlands
- Frequencies: FM: 96.2 MHz (Nottingham, Loughborough and Melton Mowbray); 96.5 MHz (Mansfield); 102.8 MHz (Derby, Ashby, and Coalville); 105.4 MHz (Leicester) DAB: 11B (Leicester); 12C (Nottingham); 12D (Derbyshire)
- RDS: Capital

Programming
- Format: Contemporary hit radio

Ownership
- Owner: Global
- Sister stations: Classic FM; Smooth East Midlands

History
- First air date: 3 January 2011
- Last air date: 5 April 2019

Links
- Website: Capital East Midlands

Capital East Midlands was a regional radio station owned and operated by Global Radio as part of the Capital radio network, broadcasting to the East Midlands from studios in Nottingham.

It launched on 3 January 2011 following the merger of Trent FM, Leicester Sound and Ram FM.

In April 2019, the station was merged with a sister Capital station in Birmingham to form Capital Midlands.

== History ==
The regional station originally broadcast as three stations – Radio Trent began broadcasting to Nottinghamshire in July 1975, later expanding its coverage area to central and southern Derbyshire in March 1987 with split local programming introduced for the area. The Derbyshire station was relaunched in 1994 as Ram FM. Leicester Sound was launched in Leicestershire in September 1984, just over 11 months after the county's first ILR station, Centre Radio, went into receivership.

Both Trent FM and Leicester Sound were owned by Midlands Radio until a takeover by Capital Radio plc led to the stations being sold off to the GWR Group in 1993. In 2005, the owners merged with Capital to form GCap Media, which was later taken over by Global Radio. In June 2008, Global launched The Hit Music Network on Trent, Leicester Sound and Ram FM alongside Ten 17 in Essex, Hertfordshire's Mercury 96.6 and Mercury FM in Sussex and Surrey (also Mercia FM and Beacon Black Country until their sale to Orion Media). Local programming was restricted to daily breakfast and weekday afternoon & drive time slots with networked output originating from Nottingham. Two other Hit Music stations – London's 95.8 Capital FM and Red Dragon FM in south east Wales retained local output.

On 13 September 2010, Global Radio announced it would merge Trent FM, Leicester Sound and Ram FM to form a sole regional station as part of a merger between its Hit Music and Galaxy network stations to form the nine-station Capital radio network. The merger led to the closure of studios in Leicester and advertising offices in Derby.

On 26 February 2019, Global confirmed the station would be merged with Capital Birmingham. From Monday 8 April 2019, regional output will consist of a three-hour Drivetime show from Birmingham on weekdays, alongside news bulletins, traffic updates and advertising. Local breakfast and weekend shows were replaced with network programming from London.

The last local programming from Capital East Midlands aired on Friday 5 April 2019. Local news, traffic and advertising for the region continues to air as opt-outs - the station also retains offices in Nottingham.

== Notable former presenters ==
- Sacha Brooks (now at Capital XTRA Reloaded)
- Emma Caldwell
- Rich Clarke (now at Heart South)
- Andi Durrant (now at Kisstory)
- Dave Kelly
- Margherita Taylor (now at Smooth Radio and Classic FM)
- Andy Twigge (now at BBC Radio Derby)
