= John Peters (DJ) =

British disc jockey (1949/1950–2025)

- Born: 22 November 1949; Ashford, Middlesex, England
- Died: 24 May 2025 (aged 75)
- Presenting career
- Show: The Friday Fandango, •John's Jukebox •Boom Heritage Chart
- Station: Boom Radio (2021–2025)
- Time slot: Friday 6–8 pm; Saturday 4–7 pm; Sunday 12–2 pm
- Show: Gravity FM (2009–2025); Radio2XS (2009–c.2010)
- Stations: 106.6 Smooth Radio (2007–2010); Saga 106.6 FM (2003–2007); GEM-AM (1988–1999); Radio Trent (1975–1988)
- Style: Presenter
- Country: United Kingdom

John Peters (22 November 1949 – 24 May 2025) was a British disc jockey and long established personality in the East Midlands region. Known for his distinctive voice, he presented shows on many of the region's radio stations, including Radio Trent, GEM-AM, Saga 106.6 FM and 106.6 Smooth Radio, Radio2XS and Gravity FM in Grantham, Lincolnshire.

Peters latterly presented three shows on Boom Radio: a Friday show called The Friday Fandango at 6pm, a Saturday show at 4 pm called John's Jukebox and also The Vintage Charts on Sunday at 12 noon. He also presented The Fifties Chart on sister station Boom Light directly following this at 2 pm.

== Early career ==
Peters sent a demo to BBC Radio One in 1968 which got a favourable response from the producers panel, although it did not lead to a job. In 1972 he applied to Radio Luxemburg and performed live in front of the programme director Ken Evans. It came down to two contenders and Mark Wesley got the job.

== United Biscuits Network and Radio Trent ==
Peters was contacted in 1974 by UBN's programme director Adrian Love (son of Geoff Love) while working at a Relay Station operated by the Post Office through which UBN broadcast to factories in Osterley (studio base), Liverpool, Manchester and Tollcross in Glasgow. Peters had already met Roger Day on air and was keen to work there. Peters joined in April 1974.

In 1975, Radio Trent were looking for presenters and Bob Snyder (Radio 270) who was also in the UBN line up, was to become Trent's programme director. Peters left UBN in May 1975 and moved to Nottingham to help set up the area's first commercial radio station. The station, Radio Trent, was launched on Thursday 3 July 1975, and he hosted its first programme. He spent several years with Trent and hosted many shows including Trent Top 30, which was also later broadcast on Leicester Sound and Derby's Trent 945 (later called Ram FM) before moving to its medium wave service, GEM-AM, when this was established in 1988 as a result of Independent Broadcasting Authority requirements over the simulcasting of programmes on both the AM and FM frequencies.

After several years with GEM, one of his Trent colleagues became involved in the management of a new station, Century FM based in Nottingham, and he was given the chance to return to FM broadcasting. However, he maintained his links with GEM, and eventually became its sole local weekday presenter after the station's purchase by GWR Radio. At Classic Gold GEM (as it was then renamed), he presented the afternoon drivetime show and voiced local announcements.

== Freelance career and Saga 106.6 FM ==
In 1999, Peters became a freelance presenter, hosting shows for a number of stations in the East Midlands region, as well as also doing some behind the scenes engineering work. But in 2003, he made a return to regular presenting after joining Saga 106.6 FM. He became Saga's breakfast presenter and hosted the station's inaugural programme.

He was with Saga throughout its time on air, and was part of the launch team of the station's replacement, 106.6 Smooth Radio. When Smooth Radio began in March 2007, Peters initially presented its weekday drivetime show. In October 2007, he became a night time and weekend presenter. He left Smooth Radio at the beginning of 2010.

In 2010, Peters also presented a show on Saturday afternoon with community radio station Gravity FM in Grantham. He also presented 60s2XS on Radio2XS. He also presented a morning show on Radio Trent, a reformed online station, with other former Trent Presenters. It was launched on 3 July 2011 to coincide with the launch of the original Radio Trent. Peters made a return to breakfast programming from 3 January 2012 on Gravity FM.

During his spare time, Peters was involved with broadcast electronics, and built his own station at home. He also enjoyed restoring classic cars.

In February 2021, he joined Boom Radio, where he presented The Vintage Charts, John's Jukebox and a show on Friday evenings.

== Death ==
Peters died on 24 May 2025, at the age of 75. His death was announced the following day. The final editions of his show, The Vintage Chart, to air before his death had been broadcast on 18 May. Boom Radio subsequently announced that he had recorded a further edition of the programme featuring the Top 20 from 26 May 1966, and this was aired as a tribute to him on Sunday 1 June. The programme was preceded by a tribute from his friend and Boom colleague, David Lloyd.
