= Graham Knight (broadcaster) =

- Knight, photographed in December 2008.
- Born: Graham Lawrence Knight; 17 February 1949; Birmingham, England
- Died: 3 September 2009 (aged 60); Nottingham, England
- Career
- Station(s): BRMB, Blue Danube Radio, Radio Trent, BBC Radio Derby, BBC Radio 2

Graham Lawrence Knight (17 February 1949 – 3 September 2009) was a British broadcaster, journalist and author.

== Personal life ==
Knight was born in Sorrento Maternity Hospital, Moseley, Birmingham, England. He died in Nottingham, England, survived by two children, Matthew and Paul and his wife Cherry.

He was an avid collector of autographed books, many of whom were of authors he'd interviewed. He also collected spectacles.

In 1977, he joined the Nottingham Sports Car Club and was a commentator for their September Donington Park race meeting. He also sprinted a Mini at Curborough.

== Career ==
=== Cadbury's ===
Before moving into journalism, Knight worked in the packaging team at Cadbury's in Bournville, where he met his wife.

=== Radio ===
==== Hospital Radio ====
Graham started his career in broadcasting by volunteering on hospital radio in Birmingham.

==== Radio Trent ====
After moving to Nottingham in the mid-1970s, Graham was one of the founder DJs on Nottingham's Radio Trent as it launched in July 1975, where he presented the Phone-in Show, 'Trent Talkback'. Other DJs included John Peters, Jeff Cooper, Kid Jensen and Guy Morris. Graham also had semi regular shows on the English speaking Austrian station Blue Danube Radio, as had his colleague at Trent, Dale Winton.

==== BRMB Radio ====
He returned home to Birmingham when he joined commercial station BRMB to present the evening show.

==== BBC Radio Derby ====
Graham joined BBC Radio Derby in 1983 and presented the mid-morning show for 14 years.

==== BBC Radio 2 ====
Graham presented the Weekend Early Breakfast show on BBC Radio 2 for four years, between 1988 and the end of 1991.

=== Retail ===
From 2002 to his death, Graham owned and ran a specialist Tea, Coffee and Chocolate shop in Sherwood, Nottingham called 'General Store', selling a range of packed and loose teas and coffees, including his own blends, and unique imports such as 'Georgian Old Lady' and 'Georgian Old Gentleman'.

== Other organisations ==
Graham had been a regional board member of the National Trust, and played a critical part in setting up the Derwent Valley Trust during its creation of the National Heritage Corridor in Derbyshire between 2001 and 2007 whilst studying for an MA in Conservation Management. He also helped establish a journalism section on the Amnesty International website and co-wrote the book Outings in the Peak District with Lindsay Porter.
