= David Symonds =

English radio presenter

- Born: 28 June 1943 (age 82); Oxford, England
- Occupation: Radio presenter

David Symonds (born 28 June 1943) is an English Radio DJ. He was among the original lineup of BBC Radio 1 in 1967 and one of the original Capital Radio DJs.

== Early life and career ==
Symonds was born in Oxford, the son of Pamela and Ronald Symonds, respectively author of the Let’s Speak French textbooks and a former acting head of MI5. His grandfather was the neurologist Sir Charles Symonds. He spent a year at Oxford University reading botany. He then moved to New Zealand and started a career as an actor, but began working for NZBC news, reading and general announcing on television and radio. After returning to London in 1965, he spent a period at Radio Luxembourg and on the BBC Light Programme where he presented shows including Easy Beat and Breakfast Special. In September 1967 he was one of the initial BBC Radio 1 DJs when the station launched, introducing the weekday teatime slot.

Symonds was the last person to interview Gene Vincent on his Radio 1 show, Scene and Heard, broadcast on 16 October 1971. Bear Family Records released the recording of it in their Rebel Heart series.

Symonds resigned from Radio 1 in 1973 over a dissatisfaction with the music policy and after the introduction of a new jingle. "It said Radio One was wonderful – and it wasn't. I couldn't press the button with a clear conscience," he told his granddaughter, journalist Cara McGoogan, for a Daily Telegraph profile in 2017. Symonds joined the newly formed Capital Radio, where he hosted the station's first programme in 1973.

In the late 1970s, Symonds was programme controller of Radio Victory in Portsmouth, as well as serving as a continuity announcer for BBC Radio 4 between 1978 and 1979, and again from 1985 to 1988. He also presented Much More Music on weekday afternoons on BBC Radio 2 between 1979 and 1982. In 1981, the controller of Radio 2 told him he was being taken off air without giving any reason. He presented his last programme naked, a stunt which was reported in the media at the time. He was replaced by Gloria Hunniford. Between 1988 and 1993, Symonds hosted a weekend show for Capital Gold. In 1995, Symonds moved to Cyprus and set up his own radio station, Coast FM.

In 2011, he sold Coast FM in Cyprus and 2013 moved to France with his young Dominican wife, Bacilia Symonds, his third wife. ln France, he set up an internet radio station The Roolz.

On 14 February 2021, Symonds was one of the team of DJs who launched Boom Radio, a station aimed at the baby boom generation, found online and as part of five DAB multiplexes (in various British cities). At Boom Radio, Symonds became part of a presenter line-up which also included ex-Capital DJs Graham Dene, Nicky Horne and David 'Kid' Jensen, along with David Hamilton and Jenny Hanley. On 10 August 2021, Symonds announced on Facebook that he had been dismissed from his Saturday night show on Boom Radio.
