= Sabras Radio =

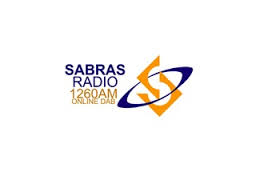

Leicester; England
- Broadcast area: Leicestershire, West Midlands and Buckinghamshire
- Frequencies: FM: 91.0 MHz; 102.1 MHz; AM: 1260 kHz; DAB: 11B
- RDS: SABRAS

Programming
- Languages: Hindi, English, Gujarati, Punjabi and Bengali
- Format: Asian

Ownership
- Owner: Sabras Sound Ltd
- Sister stations: Sanskar Radio

History
- First air date: 7 September 1995 (28 years ago)

Technical information
- Class: European
- Transmitter coordinates: 52.6190°N 1.1315°W

Links
- Website: www.sabrasradio.com

Sabras Radio is an Asian commercial radio station based in Leicester, England, available on 1260AM, FM and DAB. The radio station broadcasts to the East Midlands, Birmingham, Coventry, and Milton Keynes. It is also accessible online through sabrasradio.com and through the mobile app SabrasRadio, TuneIn and Simple Radio. The presenters broadcast in Hindi and English covering topics of interest to the British Asian audience. The station features an "open-door policy", welcoming listeners from the street to join the presenters in the studio.

== Background and History ==
On 7 September 1981, new ILR station Centre Radio broadcast a programme called Sabras on its first day on air. This continued until Centre stopped broadcasting in September 1983. However the programme was picked up by its replacement Leicester Sound and the new station aired the programme for two hours each weeknight with a three hour show on Sunday evenings.

In 1988, Sabras was further extended when split programming was introduced. It aired on GEM-AM every day from 6pm (7pm on Sundays) until 10pm.

In 1992, Leicester Sound announced that it was to launch a full time Asian station on MW and it decided to simulcast London's Sunrise Radio, thereby bringing Sabras to an end after 11 years on air. Sunrise East Midlands went on air on 15 September 1992.

The following year saw the Leicester licenses come up for renewal and Sabras Sound, which was created by an early pioneer of Asian radio in Leicester, Don Kotak, was one of the bidders, and was successful and 14 years to the day after the sabras programme launched on Centre Radio, Sabras Sound went on air.

The station was later renamed as Sabras Radio and broadcasts on AM in Leicester as well as on the county's DAB multiplex.

== EDUCO Cult ==
In 2019 Sabras Radio published two podcasts hosted by presenter Pam Sidhu featuring guest Caroline McDonagh, a nutritionist from Ireland, who was described by the Sunday World as a "disciple" of Tony Quinn who founded the Educo Cult.

Another 2019 episode of the podcast hosted by Sidhu featured Babu Shah who self-identifies as an "EDUCO Seminar Agent".

In 2025 it was reported that BBC Radio Derby and Sabras Radio presenter Pam Sidhu and her husband were recruiters for Educo and that the BBC had ignored safeguarding reports about her.
