= Classic Gold GEM =

Solid Gold GEM
England
- Broadcast area: Nottingham and Derby
- Frequencies: AM: 999 kHz in Nottingham; 945 kHz in Derby; DAB: in Derbyshire and Nottingham

Programming
- Format: Oldies

Ownership
- Owner: Classic Gold Digital (UBC)

History
- First air date: 4 October 1988
- Last air date: 3 August 2007

Links
- Website: https://solidgoldgem.co.uk/

Solid Gold GEM AM (later Classic Gold GEM-AM) was an Independent Local Radio station, broadcasting to much of Nottinghamshire, Derbyshire, Leicestershire, Rutland and East Staffordshire from studios in Nottingham, and later Dunstable, Bedfordshire.

The station ran as Solid Gold GEM AM until the mid-1990s when it was absorbed into the rest of the Classic Gold network, and was replaced on 3 August 2007 by a new network called simply Gold. The result of the merger of the Classic Gold and Capital Gold networks under one owner, GCap Media. The GEM name has since re-emerged with the launch of the internet station Solid Gold Gem AM in 2012.

== History ==
The station began as GEM-AM in 1988 (the letters GEM standing for Great East Midlands). It was one of the most well-regarded gold-formatted stations to come to the British airwaves in the late 1980s and was launched as a response to government disapproval of the simulcasting of radio companies' FM programming on their mediumwave frequencies. GEM was the offshoot of Radio Trent, which began to cater for a younger audience and became known as Trent FM upon the frequency split, and the new AM service was launched to much fanfare with a team of Olympic style runners completing a marathon from Leicester to Derby and finally to Nottingham (the three main areas to which GEM was to broadcast).

GEM's medium wave broadcasts to Nottinghamshire on 999 kHz and Derbyshire on 945 kHz were initially supplemented by transmissions on 1260 kHz to Leicestershire, but in 1992 this last frequency was given over to programming for Leicester's large Asian population (Sunrise Radio, later Sabras Radio).

In 1994 GEM's owners Midland Radio plc were bought, by expanding radio company GWR, which gradually networked the station's programming with that of other gold stations it had purchased elsewhere in the country. The station was subtly rebranded Classic Gold GEM and over time, it became more Classic Gold and less GEM, until only four hours of local programming was left.

By the end of the 1990s, Classic Gold GEM and GWR's network of other medium wave Classic Gold stations across the country were sold to media company UBC, in order for GWR to comply with government rules of the time, restricting how much share of listening one company could own. This and the other stations in the group became known as Classic Gold Digital Network.

Former Radio 1 presenter Tony Blackburn co-presented a national breakfast show on the network until 2007.

== Presentation ==
Presenters on the station included some who were already established personalities in the East Midlands region. Among them were John Peters (who launched the station as he had done with Trent in 1975). In the late 1980s a new South Asian programme hosted by DJ Magnam brought extra listenership to GEM-AM from the large South Asian community that lived in Derby and Nottingham. A number of the original presenters were later to be heard on a newer oldies and easy listening station broadcasting to the East Midlands, this time on Saga 106.6 FM, which came on air in 2003, and was later rebranded as 106.6 Smooth Radio after it was acquired by GMG Radio. Many of Saga 106.6 FM's jingles were made by JAM Creative Productions of Dallas, Texas, and Steve England, and made reference to the Great East Midlands. Classic Gold GEM used ident jingles from Manchester company Alfasound, and then PAMS and JAM.

== GCap Media and Global Radio ==
In summer 2007, when ownership restrictions were relaxed, Classic Gold's original owners, now called GCap Media after a merger, bought the network of stations back from UBC Media Group.

Having two gold networks on its hands, GCap decided to merge them. In early August 2007, the Classic Gold and Capital Gold networks were joined under the new name Gold, and local output declined further.

The station had a 4% audience reach in Nottingham, and 6% in Derby in 2006. In 1993 the reach was 24% in Nottingham, 23% in Derby. (*RAJAR ratings 1993/2006)

The dwindling audience tuning into the station's medium wave frequencies has in recent years been supplemented by those listening to a stream on the internet, and also on DAB Digital Radio in Nottingham and Leicester. The bit rate for this broadcast was reduced in 2006 to accommodate more radio stations to the digital multiplex, but was later increased back to stereo.

After nineteen years broadcasting from the basement 'Studio B' at Radio Trent's Castle Gate headquarters, Classic Gold's Nottingham studios moved, along with Trent's, to the sixth floor of Chapel Quarter, an office building on the corner of Mount Street and Chapel Bar, in January 2007.

== Solid Gold Gem AM ==
On 4 November 2012, the internet radio station Solid Gold Gem AM was launched following the original GEM-AM format. While Solid Gold Gem AM had no connection to the original GEM AM in Nottingham, its line-up featured many of the original presenters including Andy Marriott, Krissi Carpenter, Paul Burbank, Craig Strong, Tim Rogers and Len Groat who was Head of Programmes and Music at the original GEM-AM from 1988 to 1994. A commercial free station, it styles itself as "radio like it used to be". On 27 November 2014, and shortly after the station had celebrated its second anniversary, it was announced that Solid Gold Gem would cease broadcasting from midnight on 30 November. However, a week after its closure, a relaunch was announced for 15 December. The station would also now be managed by Len Groat, and a second station, Serenade Radio, was launched in February 2015. No reason was given for the broadcasting hiatus.

The station has now rebranded to Solid Gold Gem and it broadcasts 24 hours a day without advertising.
