= Centre Radio =

Former local radio station in Leicester, England

- Leicester; England
- Frequencies: 97.1 MHz FM and 1260 kHz MW

Ownership
- Owner: Leicester and Leicestershire Local Radio plc
- Operator: Independent

History
- First air date: 7 September 1981
- Last air date: 6 October 1983

Centre Radio (officially known as Leicester and Leicestershire Local Radio plc) was the first independent local radio station to serve Leicestershire. It was based at Granville House, Leicester, England. The medium wave transmission was from Freemen's Common which was subsequently used by Leicester Sound and now Sabras Radio. The FM transmission was from Billesdon.

== History ==
Centre Radio was launched on 7 September 1981 in a blaze of publicity and was broadcast on 97.1 MHz on the VHF FM waveband in stereo and on 1260 kHz on the medium wave band (238 metres in wavelength). Several adverts were placed in the Leicester Mercury, and the station's presenters appeared at many local events preceding the launch. To build people's interest further, one of their more famous DJs, Timmy Mallett would often rollerskate up and down London Road. Mallett presented the first breakfast show with multi-coloured hair, dressed in a dinner jacket and a bowtie which was filmed for a BBC documentary.

Other presenters on Centre Radio included Tony Cook, Jay Cooper, Mark Hurrell, Alan West, John Evington, Mark Williams and Kenny Hague.

In September 1983, financial problems caused by the recession and alleged overspending setting up the premises hit the fledgling station hard, but attracting listeners also proved difficult. BBC Radio Leicester had been on air since 1967, and many listeners stayed loyal to the BBC. On 5 October 1983, the former managing director of Centre Radio, Geoffrey Pointon, made an offer to take over Centre Radio under a consortium called Crestnote. Although Pointon’s rescue bid had widespread support from both the board and the National Union of Journalists, the Independent Broadcasting Authority (IBA) blocked it, because they felt the structure of the company that owned Centre Radio would change to such an extent that Centre Radio would have to reapply for the licence.

In response to the IBA’s rejection of Pointon’s bid, Centre Radio announced on the following day (6 October) that it would cease trading, appointing Ernst & Whinney as its liquidators: regular programming ended at 1pm with the playing of Paul Young's "Come Back and Stay", followed by a short news bulletin read by Tony Cook (Centre's head of news) announcing the station's closure. This was followed by continuous music until 5.30pm, when Diana Ross's "The Boss" faded into a final closing announcement.

The station's licence was re-advertised and awarded to Radio Trent, which commenced broadcasting as Leicester Sound on 7 September 1984. Leicester Sound later merged with their owner (since renamed to Trent FM) and Ram FM in January 2011 to form the regional station Capital FM East Midlands, based in Nottingham, with regional programming ending on Friday 5 April 2019.
