= Nicky Horne =

British broadcaster

- Born: 3 September 1950 (age 75)
- Occupations: Television and Radio presenter
- Years active: 1969–present

Nicky Horne (born 3 September 1950) is an English DJ, who has worked for a variety of radio stations, including Capital Radio, BBC Local Radio and Boom Radio.

== Career ==
Horne worked as a road manager for Emperor Rosko in 1969, before presenting shows on BBC Radio 1, from 1970 to 1973.

He interviewed John Lennon at the former Beatle's New York home in 1975.

Horne was one of the original line-up on London's Capital Radio, where he presented shows such as Your Mother Wouldn't like it, Mummy's Weekly and 6 of the Best. He remained on Capital Radio until 1988, and also sat in for Alan Freeman presenting Pick of the Pops Take 2 in 1986.

Nicky Horne and Miles Aiken anchored UK Channel 4's coverage of American football in the 1980s.

He re-joined Radio 1 in the early 1990s where he was a stand-in presenter and at the same time, he presented a weekend afternoon show on Classic FM. He also worked on the UK commercial radio overnight sustaining service, The Superstation.

His has presented television shows such as music programmes Rock Steady and Ear Say and sport including American Football and Davis Cup tennis.

Horne joined Virgin Radio in 1995. He took over the drivetime show from Nick Abbot and two weekend shows as well. In 1997, he took on the weekday afternoon show from 1 – 4 pm, before leaving the station in 1998.

In 1998 Horne joined BBC Radio 2, presenting the weekend overnight show (Fridays/Saturdays 12 midnight – 3 am and Saturdays/Sundays 1 – 4 am), before his shows were taken over by Lynn Parsons in 1999.

At the beginning of 2003, Horne replaced Charles Nove on the drivetime show on London's Jazz FM, later moving to mid-mornings until mid-2005. In later years he presented shows on Capital Gold every Sunday afternoon fronting a Classic Album Show. He worked at the digital radio station Planet Rock as the weekday evening presenter until 17 May 2013. He then left to join TeamRock Radio, starting as the evening presenter (6 – 9 pm) in June.

In February 2021 Nicky Horne began presenting a new weekday afternoon show for Boom Radio.
