= Danny Cox (radio presenter) =

British radio presenter and journalist

Danny Cox is a British radio presenter and journalist.

He currently presents music-based shows on Virgin Radio Legends and Virgin Radio 80s Plus; he is also a journalist for BBC News Streaming, a presenter of The Newsroom on the BBC World Service, and a presenter at BBC Radio Oxford.

== Career ==
Cox's career began at BBC Radio Leicester.

In the 1980s, Cox presented the chart show on Radio Trent in Nottingham. The show involved a countdown of the best-selling pop music songs of the week, with some or all of the songs being played in full.

In the latter half of the 1990s, he worked as a presenter at Fox FM (now known as Heart Oxfordshire) in Oxfordshire; during this time, he lost his fiancee, the broadcaster Sue McGarry, to suicide.

Cox launched the Oxford Channel in 1999.

In 2006, Cox was working as a presenter at BBC Radio Oxford, presenting on weekdays between 10 a.m. and 1 p.m. In 2008, Louisa Hannan, also a presenter at BBC Radio Oxford at the time, joined Cox for a new mid-morning show on the station, "Daytimes with Danny and Lou". The show was created as a result of feedback from members of the BBC Radio Oxford audience, some of which was gathered at a special event. The show included music, consumer advice and other content. Cox and Hannan presented their last programme together in 2009. Hannan continued to present the programme after Cox's departure from BBC Radio Oxford in 2009. In 2009, Cox was also working as a voiceover artist.

In 2009, Cox was appointed Station Controller and presenter of the morning show at Mix 96 in Buckinghamshire.

As of 2016, Cox was a sports presenter at BBC Radio Oxford. He also presented the station's Saturday afternoon sports programme at this time. Cox is still a presenter of sports programmes for the station. In addition, in the 2010s, Cox presented some travel bulletins for the station, live from the Traffic Control Centre of Oxfordshire.

Since 2014, Cox has been at the BBC World Service as a presenter of The Newsroom (a programme featuring reports from BBC journalists from around the world about the latest news stories); he has also presented BBC Outside Source (a programme featuring in-depth coverage of current news stories from across the world). As part of his duties as a presenter of The Newsroom, Cox also presents the BBC's Global News Podcast.

Cox is a presenter on Virgin Radio Legends, a radio station broadcasting nationally on DAB+ in the UK, and Virgin Radio 80s Plus, which broadcasts to some of the UK on digital radio. He joined Virgin Radio Anthems no later than 2021.

Cox is also a Senior Journalist at BBC News Streaming.

Cox has been the sole voiceover for BBC Radio Derby.
