= Trent FM =

- Nottingham; England
- Broadcast area: Nottinghamshire
- Frequencies: FM: 96.2 MHz (Nottingham); 96.5 MHz (Mansfield); DAB: 12C; Freeview
- RDS: TRENT FM

Programming
- Format: Contemporary hit radio

Ownership
- Owner: Global

History
- First air date: 3 July 1975
- Last air date: 3 January 2011
- Former names: Radio Trent (1975–1988); 96 Trent FM (1993–2007)
- Former frequencies: 999 MW; 945 MW

Trent FM was an Independent Local Radio station which broadcast to Nottinghamshire. The station merged with two other East Midlands stations, Leicester Sound and Ram FM to form Capital FM East Midlands (part of Global's Capital FM Network) on Monday 3 January 2011.

== History ==
An early Trent logo 301 metres (1,000 kHz) mediumwave and VHF FM 96.2 MHz

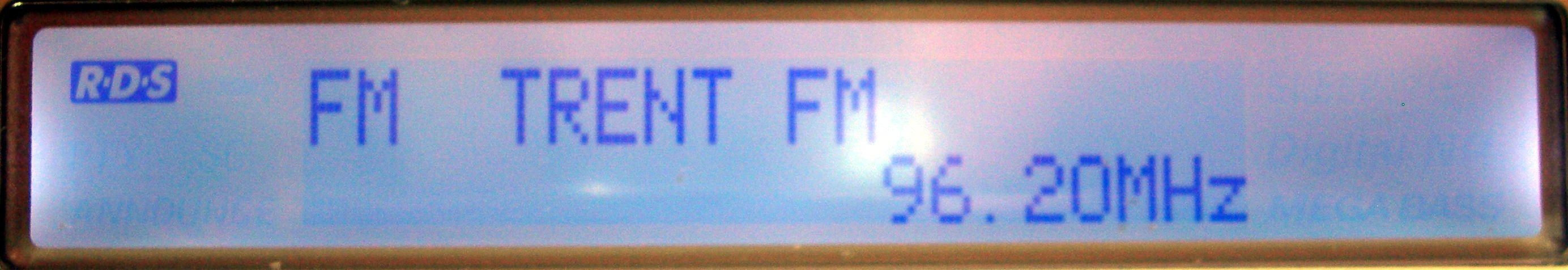
RDS showing Trent FM

Launched on 3 July 1975 as Radio Trent and based in the converted Nottingham Women's Hospital at 29–31 Castle Gate, Nottingham, the station broadcast on FM and medium wave and was managed initially by Dennis Maitland, a commercial director at the highly acclaimed offshore pirate station, Radio London.

The original line-up of presenters featured John Peters (the first presenter on air), former Radio Luxembourg presenter Kid Jensen, Jeff Cooper, Peter Quinn, Graham Knight, Chris Baird and Guy Morris. The station's news and sports team was led by Dave Newman and Martin Johnson – with Trent making heavy use of outside broadcasts to cover major events and incidents both within and beyond its broadcast area. Its first programme controller was Bob Snyder from Piccadilly, an ex offshore pirate broadcaster who'd been working on commercial radio franchise applications. He was replaced in 1977 by Neil Spence, better known as the former Radio London DJ Dave Dennis.

Subsequently, Bev Smith from ATV, was appointed before the arrival of Chris Hughes in the post under new MD Ron Coles, both from BBC local radio. As Head of Presentation and then Deputy Programme Director, Len Groat, an ex Metro broadcaster, programmed music and assembled the station's jingle identification packages.

Following the successful application in 1984 to run a new station in Leicester which it launched as Leicester Sound, Radio Trent expanded transmission to neighbouring Derbyshire in 1987. The station was renamed Trent FM in 1988 when it launched a separate oldies-format service, GEM-AM, on its, and Leicester Sound's, medium wave frequencies. Trent's owners, Midlands Radio plc, was taken over by the Capital Radio group GWR Group in 1993, which then disposed of the East Midlands assets to GWR. The Nottingham and Mansfield FM services were branded 96 Trent FM, while the Derby service became known as RAM FM. The medium wave GEM-AM service was then rebranded, to become Classic Gold GEM, and ultimately Classic Gold.

By spring 2005, Trent found itself owned by GCap Media, after GWR Group's merger with Capital Radio Group. It became part of GCap's One Network brand, a network of FM and DAB music stations across southern England, the English Midlands and Wales. The station changed hands again in 2008 when Global Radio bought GCap Media.

After 31 years based at Castle Gate, the historic street leading to Nottingham Castle, the station began broadcasting from new studios at the Chapel Quarter development at Chapel Bar, at midday on 9 January 2007. Trent lost the 96 prefix in its name in July 2007, to become once again Trent FM.

On 30 June 2008, The Hit Music Network was launched from the Chapel Quarter complex. This network served Trent FM, Ram FM, Leicester Sound, Ten 17, Mercury (Watford) and Mercury FM in Surrey, (and Mercia, Beacon Black Country until their sale to Orion), with programming broadcast from Nottingham outside of breakfast, afternoon and drivetime. Although part of the same network, Capital FM and Red Dragon FM continued airing locally produced programming 24 hours a day.

Trent FM broadcast its last local programme on Friday 31 December 2010 ahead of the station's merger with Leicester Sound and Ram FM to form Capital FM East Midlands as part of Global Radio's plans to launch The Capital FM Network. The new station officially began broadcasting at 10am on Monday 3 January 2011 and is based at Trent's Chapel Quarter studios. Trent's weekday breakfast presenters Emma Caldwell and Andy Twigge presented Capital Breakfast for the station until moving to the weekday drivetime show in April 2012. Ram FM's Dino & Pete hosted drivetime until April 2012 when they switched to Breakfast.

== Past presenters ==
- David "Kid" Jensen (1975 original team, now Boom Radio)
- David Lloyd (now Boom Radio)
- Graham Knight (1975 original team, deceased)
- Dale Winton (deceased)
- Lucy Horobin (now at Heart Dance)
- Anne-Marie Minhall (now at Classic FM)
- Jo Russell
- John Shaw (deceased)
- John Peters (1975 original team, deceased) Later GEM AM, Saga East Midlands & Boom Radio
- Guy Morris (1975 original team. Broadcaster and sound engineer. Now on 2XS Rocks)
- Jeff Cooper (1975 original team. Broadcaster and Voice-over actor. Now on 2XS Rocks)
- Peter Quinn (1975 original team. Broadcaster, Atlantis Radio, Boom Radio)
- Chris Baird (1975 original team)
- Steve Merike (deceased), ex Radio 1, Radio Brighton, Piccadilly, Pennine, later on GEM AM and Saga East Midlands
- Chris Burns, now Head of BBC Local Radio
- Rob Wagstaff
- Mark Dennison (BBC Radio Nottingham, Magna Radio)
- Pete Wagstaff
- Gary Terzza
- Peter Tait
- Danny Cox
- Andy Miller, later GEM 106
- Andy Marriott, later GEM AM, BBC Radio Nottingham, now at Boom Radio and Serenade Radio
- Tony Lyman, later GEM AM, Saga East Midlands, BBC East Midlands, deceased.
- Andy Twigge, now at BBC Radio Derby
- Paul Robey, later Saga East Midlands, BBC Radio Nottingham, now at Boom Radio
- Kenny Hague
- Jenni Costello, ex Radio 1, now Solid Gold GEM, More Radio/Isle of Wight Radio
- Erica Hughes
- Len Groat, later GEM AM, now Solid Gold GEM
- Brian Tansley, deceased
- Richard Stone
- Franklyn Hughes
- Craig Strong, later Ram FM, Gem AM, Century 106 FM, Lincs FM, Mercia FM
- Gary Burton, later Smooth East Midlands, BBC 6 Music
- Tony Delahunty
- Mark Spivey
- Graeme Neale (Deceased)

== Global Radio Commercial Production Studio at Trent FM ==
The Trent FM studios also housed the majority of the local commercial production studios for Global Radio. The studios produced the local commercial output of Global's local radio stations, through 8 dedicated studios. Trent FM's Castle Gate building housed six of these studios, and the facility remained with the station when it moved to its new home at Chapel Quarter, Nottingham in January 2007.
