= Moorlands Radio =

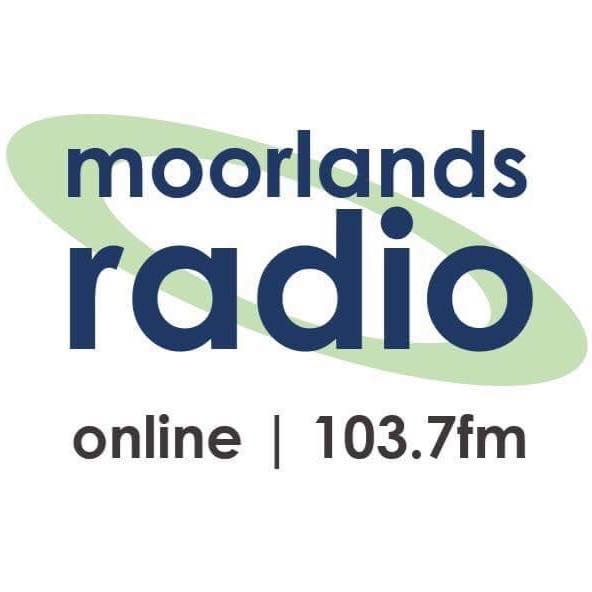
- Leek; England
- Broadcast area: Staffordshire Moorlands
- Frequencies: FM: 97.3 MHz (Leek); 103.7 MHz (Biddulph); DAB: 9A (Congleton & Leek); 8A (Stoke & Newcastle)
- RDS: Moorland

Programming
- Format: Community radio

Ownership
- Owner: Moorlands Radio CIC

History
- First air date: 7 November 2009

Links
- Website: https://www.moorlandsradio.co.uk

Moorlands Radio is a community radio station based in Leek in the Staffordshire Moorlands, England. It was granted the full-time licence in the second round of community radio licensing by broadcast regulator Ofcom in February 2008. The station serves the rural Staffordshire Moorlands, covering the main towns of Leek and Biddulph.

It is funded through a combination of grant funding from local authorities and charities and revenue from the sale of advertising to local businesses. All presenters and staff at the station are volunteers.

== History ==
The Moorlands Radio project was founded by a group of local enthusiasts in 2003, led by established presenter Tony Mullins. From 2003 to 2006, the station undertook three restricted service licence broadcasts of 28 days each in duration.

The full-time station was launched by founder Tony Mullins at 10:03 am on Saturday 7 November 2009 and is currently on its third five-year community radio licence from Ofcom.

On 16 April 2016, Moorlands Radio moved into new studio facilities at Leek Community Fire Station. The last show from their old studios was presented by station founders Tony Mullins and Mervyn Gamage. The transmission from the Stockwell Villas studio ended at 10 am, at which time broadcasts switched over to a feed from the new studios. In March 2020, Moorlands Radio returned to their previous Stockwell Villas premises.

On 31 August 2020, the station began operating a second online stream of programming, Moorlands Gold, targeting an older audience with an oldies music format.

In December 2020, due to the financial constraints imposed by the COVID-19 pandemic, Moorlands Radio announced that it would no longer pay show fees to its daytime presenters and would become a fully volunteer-led organisation.

In August 2021, a new company Moorlands DAB Ltd was established as a joint venture between Moorlands Radio and a team of local broadcasting and business people and the station announced its intention to apply for a local small-scale DAB multiplex licence to broadcast to the Congleton and Leek, Staffordshire areas on DAB digital radio.

== Programming ==
Daytime programming is generally aimed at a mainstream audience and features popular music from the 1960s to today with local news, interviews with local personalities and interactive features.

The daytime schedule features local news every hour on the half hour with national news from Radio News Hub on the hour. Breakfast and Drivetime both feature regular traffic and travel updates.

Evening programmes are specialist in nature, and include shows focusing on classical music, folk music, local Staffordshire bands, rock music and dance music.

== Notable presenters ==
From the station's launch in 2009 until a few months before his death from cancer in early 2011, a daily programme was presented by Sam Plank.

From the station's launch as an RSL station in 2003 and its full-time service from 2009, ex-Radio Caroline and commercial radio presenter Steve England helped set up the station, presented various shows, and produced all of the station's IDs and jingles.

== Transmission ==
Moorlands Radio transmits with an ERP of 50 watts on 103.7 MHz from a transmitter site in the village of Biddulph Moor. Its broadcast footprint extends to the target areas of Leek and Biddulph and its signal also reaches the town of Congleton in neighbouring Cheshire.

In 2021, an additional transmitter was established at the station's premises in Leek, using an ERP of 25 watts on 97.3 MHz. This improves signal coverage in the Leek town centre area.
