= Blue Danube Radio =

- Austria
- Frequency: FM: 103.8 MHz

Programming
- Format: News, Music and Speech

Ownership
- Owner: ORF

History
- First air date: 23 August 1979
- Last air date: 31 January 2000

Blue Danube Radio (BDR) was an English-language radio station broadcast by the Österreichischer Rundfunk (English: Austrian Broadcasting; a.k.a. ORF).

== History ==
Blue Danube Radio went live on 23 August 1979, created principally for the United Nations community at UNO-City in Vienna. It was popular with many Austrian people too. The name "Blue Danube" was also previously used by the unrelated Blue Danube Network radio station operated by American Forces Network (AFN) and the 5th United States Army in the American-occupied zone of Austria between 1945 and 1955. From 1995, it shared airtime with FM4, which eventually completely took over on 1 February 2000.

Favourite programmes included Continental Breakfast, Soft Sound Café, Drive Time, Today@Six, and Sunday Brunch. Many of the people who worked for BDR moved to FM4. Notables include David Halliwell, Paul Catty, Joe Remick, John Wilde, Joanna Bostock, Jill Zobel, Ellis Hill, Paul Hollingdale, Chris Wisbey, Stuart Freeman, Dale Winton, Graham Knight, Paul Holmes, Steve Allen, John Brocks and Katya Adler. It also aired syndicated Casey Kasem's Top 40 (American hit parade), and a short programme called Passport that encouraged the study of foreign languages.

== Frequencies ==
=== Burgenland ===
Name	Frequency
Rechnitz - Hirschenstein	97.4 MHz

=== Carinthia ===
Name	Frequency
Klagenfurt 1 - Dobratsch / Vill. Alpe	102.9 MHz
Wolfsberg - Koralpe	102.3 MHz
Spittal/Drau 1 - Goldeck	103.6 MHz

=== Lower Austria ===
Name	Frequency
St. Pölten - Jauerling	98.8 MHz
Semmering - Sonnwendstein	92.4 MHz
Weitra - Wachberg	101.4 MHz

=== Upper Austria ===
Name	Frequency
Linz 1 - Lichtenberg	104.0 MHz
Linz 2 - Freinberg	102.0 MHz
Bad Ischl - Katrin	105.1 MHz
Windischgarsten - Kleinerberg	102.1 MHz

=== Salzburg ===
Name	Frequency
Salzburg - Gaisberg	104.6 MHz
Lend - Luxkogel	97.7 MHz
Eben / Pongau	98.6 MHz
Mauterndorf - Großeck	98.5 MHz
St. Michael / Lungau - Bärenkogel	96.9 MHz
Zell am See 1 - Lechnereck	101.9 MHz

=== Styria ===
Name	Frequency
Graz - Schöckl	101.7 MHz
Schladming - Hauser Kaibling	103.3 MHz
Bruck a.d. Mur 1 - Mugel	102.1 MHz
Rottenmann - Sonnenberg	100.0 MHz
Neumarkt - Kulmeralpe	100.3 MHz

=== Tyrol ===
Name	Frequency
Innsbruck 1 - Patscherkofel	101.4 MHz
Innsbruck 2 - Seegrube	102.5 MHz
Lienz - Rauchkofel	101.0 MHz
Kufstein - Kitzbüheler Horn	99.9 MHz
Hopfgarten - Hohe Salve	100.3 MHz
Landeck - Grabberg	98.4 MHz
Ehrwald 1 - Zugspitze	100.7 MHz
St. Anton - Galzig	97.6 MHz

=== Vienna ===
Name	Frequency
Wien 1 - Kahlenberg	103.8 MHz
Wien 2 - Himmelhof	91.0 MHz

=== Vorarlberg ===
Name	Frequency
Bregenz - Pfänder	102.1 MHz
Feldkirch - Vorderälpele	102.8 MHz

== See also ==
- List of radio stations in Austria
