= Anne-Marie Minhall =

English radio presenter

Anne-Marie Minhall is an English radio presenter who works for Classic FM. She presents the weekday afternoon show from 1 pm to 4 pm.

== Early life and education ==
Minhall was born in London and raised in a Nottinghamshire village. She attended Rushcliffe School, a comprehensive in West Bridgford, Nottinghamshire, and later attended Clarendon College of FE (now Nottingham College) in the city centre for her A Levels.

== Career ==
Her broadcasting career started by volunteering at Radio Trent Careline and then becoming a newsreader at Trent FM. She presented the late-night show on the opening night of East Midlands regional station GEM-AM. She moved to Independent Radio News, in 1994.

=== Classic FM ===
Minhall joined Classic FM in 1996, four years after its launch, as a regular newsreader and as the main presenter of the weekly arts and culture show, The Guest List, which she hosted for just over three years. She has remained with the station ever since, and her work has included the Great Composers series featuring biographies and examples of music, and work as the news editor for Classic FM. In 2014 she became the weekday afternoon presenter, with a program consisting of Classic FM Requests between 1 pm to 2 pm followed by her own show from 2 pm to 4 pm which includes the "Hall of Fame 3 at 3", a choice of three items from the Classic FM Hall of Fame. She also presents two Christmas editions of Classic FM Requests, which are 'Broadcast' on Christmas Eve afternoon and on Christmas morning. In 2018 it was reported that her show attracted 2.7 million listeners every week, out of the channel's 5.7 million weekly listeners.

== Other work ==
Minhall presented the City of Birmingham Symphony Orchestra's "Spring Classics in Reading" in 2017 and Bournemouth Symphony Orchestra's "Classical Extravaganza" in 2021 in Poole.

She has also worked as a voice-over artist for advertisers including Sport England and 20th Century Fox.

== Honours and awards ==
In 2016, Minhall was ranked 10th in the Radio Times Favourite Radio Voice Poll (women), which that year was won by Kirsty Young.
