= Natalie Wheen =

Natalie Wheen (born 1947) is an English writer and radio presenter, broadcasting on the BBC and Classic FM.

Wheen, born in Shanghai, was a presenter of BBC Radio 4's arts programme Kaleidoscope and Radio 3's evening sequence Mainly for Pleasure (subsequently In Tune). Quentin Letts described her as "the combative Natalie Wheen, one of the BBC's best-known (and deeper) voices." She broadcast on Classic FM between 1999 and 2012. On her debut there, The Guardian described her as "someone with a compendious knowledge of classical music, allied to a camp irreverence. ... Wheen's tongue is famously withering ... With her rattling pace and deep, warm voice, this is a clever appointment." One Sunday Times journalist described her as "breathy and bubbly"; another described her as "posher than a dowager duchess", and considered her axing "inexplicable".

In 1994, Wheen was one of thirty-five members of the UK arts scene who signed a letter calling for the resignation of art critic Brian Sewell. Sewell responded by placing on the cover of his book The Reviews That Caused The Rumpus: And Other Pieces a version of the painting The Nightmare, in which he was shown sitting naked on a sleeping woman. He stated that he hoped "everyone will interpret the woman who has fainted clean away as Natalie Wheen."

Wheen was nominated for a Sony Award in 2000 and 2004. She was placed third in a poll of "most attractive radio voices" by readers of the Radio Times magazine in 2002.

Wheen now co-owns an olive oil business along with artist Deborah MacMillan, widow of choreographer Kenneth MacMillan.
