= Pattison College =

Location
- 86-90 Binley Road; Coventry, West Midlands, CV3 1FQ; England; 52.4054°N 1.4804°W

Information
- Type: Independent
- Established: 1949
- Founder: Betty Pattison
- Department for Education URN: 103747 Tables
- Ofsted: Reports
- Headmaster: Graeme Delaney
- Gender: Coeducational
- Age: 3 to 16
- Enrolment: 148 (as of 2023)
- Website: http://www.pattisons.co.uk/

Pattison College is a non-selective independent school in the east of Coventry, England. Pattison College provides education for children aged 3 to 16 of all abilities. The school was established as a Christian foundation in 1949 as a school for students interested in pursuing theatre as a career. While its emphasis has changed since its founding, the college still offers a three-year vocational course in music theatre for students aged 16 to 19.

The school passed Ofsted inspection in November 2004 and January 2005 (Early Years). It passed ISI inspection in March 2023, focusing on the college's compliance with standards.

In 2019, the college was acquired by the company Chatsworth Schools.

In 2023, the school announced it would expand its campus after increased enrollment.

== Notable former pupils ==
- Richard Armitage, actor
- Sara Blizzard, weather presenter
