= Sara Blizzard =

Weather presenter

Sara Louise Blizzard (born 17 August 1970 in Coventry, Warwickshire) is a weather presenter for BBC Weather based at the Nottingham Weather Hub for the corporation. She regularly presents the weather forecasts for East Midlands Today, Midlands Today and BBC North West Tonight (the three programmes served by the Nottingham hub).

She grew up in Coventry and trained in Dance and Drama when at the independent Pattison College school in east Coventry. Her broadcasting experience began when she presented a Sunday afternoon programme on the hospital radio station at Walsgrave General Hospital in Coventry. In 1993, she worked at the studios of Mercia FM, presenting the night-time Nightbeat programme which was broadcast on Leicester Sound. In March 1994, she moved to the breakfast show of Leicester Sound and had a Sunday afternoon show, and would later in the year present for three years with Guy Morris and Guy Harris. In late 1997, she worked in Liverpool as a news reporter for L!VE TV and presented programmes such as Vets and Pets, Live Drive and Merseybeat the Crimestoppers programme with Merseyside Police Force.

She joined East Midlands Today as the weather presenter in March 1999 and through consolidation became a duty presenter for the Nottingham Weather Hub in 2018. Her voice is used for the Trafficmaster in-car information system. Blizzard left the BBC in February 2025 after 27 years.
