= Boom Radio =

UK commercial radio station targeted at baby boomers

- United Kingdom
- Frequency: DAB: 11A

Programming
- Format: 1950s–1980s music

Ownership
- Owner: Boom Radio Ltd
- Sister stations: Boom Light

History
- First air date: 14 February 2021

Links
- Website: www.boomradiouk.com

Boom Radio (also Boom Radio UK) is an independent, commercial, national radio station in the United Kingdom. Owned by Boom Radio Ltd, the station is aimed at baby boomers, the generation of people born between 1946 and 1964. Launched on 14 February 2021, Boom Radio broadcasts nationally on the Sound Digital DAB multiplex and is also available online.

The station was developed and launched by Phil Riley and David Lloyd, two commercial radio executives who felt older listeners were being overlooked by stations such as BBC Radio 2 in favour of a younger audience. Boom's content features a mixture of music, conversation and radio personality, with presenters including many who have previously made their name in national and commercial radio, such as Graham Dene, David Hamilton and Diana Luke. The programming for Boom Radio is recorded and presented remotely by its presenters from their own homes, rather than being done in a traditional in-house studio setting. Boom's launch against the backdrop of the COVID-19 pandemic influenced its decision to operate without a central studio.

== History ==
=== Launch ===
The idea for Boom Radio was conceived and developed by Phil Riley and David Lloyd, two radio executives with lengthy careers in commercial radio, who felt there was a gap in the market for a station aimed at the baby boomer generation, which they felt was being overlooked by other stations. Riley's background in radio includes his role as Chief Executive of Chrysalis Radio, where he oversaw the launch of Heart, and the network's eventual sale to Global Radio, while Lloyd has worked both in presenting and executive roles at stations such as LBC and Virgin.

Plans for the launch of Boom Radio were announced on 23 November 2020, when Riley and Lloyd confirmed the station would launch on DAB early the following year. Named after the generation it planned to cater for, Boom Radio would initially be available in London, Birmingham, Bristol, Portsmouth and Glasgow, as well as broadcasting online, and offer a mix of music, conversation and presenter personality. Speaking about Boom Radio, Riley said, "Our own research has found radio is still the most popular medium for the Boomer generation, yet the majority feel that the industry is geared more towards younger people. We see Boom Radio filling that gap".

On 2 December 2020 the station announced a round of executive appointments to its commercial team, drawing on people with experience at large media companies such as Global and Sky. Dawn Le Men, former Head of Media Partners at Sky, was appointed as Boom's Head of Sales, while Ali Page, former Director of Client and Category Development for Global, was appointed to be Client Development Adviser. It was also announced that Don Thomson, a former Chief Operations Officer at Global, and who had also worked in roles for Yorkshire Television and Chrysalis Radio, would join the board of Boom Radio as a non-executive director.

On 11 January 2021 the station unveiled its inaugural schedule and list of presenters, with Graham Dene (formerly of Smooth Radio and Capital Radio) presenting the weekday breakfast show. Other weekday presenters would include David Hamilton, Nicky Horne and Diana Luke, while Greg Edwards would present a soul programme and Anna Raeburn would relaunch her Talk to Anna programme. Other programmes planned for Boom Radio included a show with Esther Rantzen and her daughter, Rebecca Wilcox, Still Busy Living, described as the station's own version of Desert Island Discs, and programming covering topics such as gardening and book reviews.

Later in January 2021, Travel Weekly reported that Silver Travel Advisor, a mature travel information hub, had signed an exclusive deal to provide travel content for Boom Radio. As part of this deal, it was announced that a weekly Silver Travel Show would air on Sunday evenings, as well as a monthly podcast presented by Jennie Carr, Silver Travel Advisor's creative director. Also in January, Boom Radio confirmed it had signed a deal with online dating platform provider White Label Dating to launch Boom Singles, a dating website for its target audience.

Boom Radio was officially launched at 10:00 on 14 February 2021, with Graham Dene being the first presenter to be heard on the station. The first song to be played was "All You Need is Love" by The Beatles. The station also dedicated its own poem, An Ode to Boomers, to its audience.

=== Expansion ===
Following the initial launch the station planned to expand to DAB in other parts of the UK throughout 2021. But on 11 March it was confirmed the station would launch nationally on the Sound Digital multiplex from the following day. The announcement was made on air by presenter David Hamilton and on social media with a letter to its listeners: "The response has been so strong that we've brought forward all our plans to grow. You told us you wanted us on DAB across the UK and from Friday – we will be!" The Nottingham Post subsequently reported that positive audience figures from the station's first two weeks on air, as well as feedback from listeners, had prompted Boom's investors to finance the national launch.

On 19 October 2021, it was announced that David Elms, Head of Media at KPMG, had joined the board of Boom Radio as non-executive chairman.

In October 2022 Boom launched a £1m television advertising campaign featuring presenter David Hamilton.

On 21 November 2022, it was announced that Paul O'Grady would join Boom Radio to present a show on Christmas Day similar to the one he presented for BBC Radio 2. Riley later described how the presenter "rocketed our audience", giving Boom record audience numbers on the day. He was scheduled to return for a show on Easter Sunday 2023, then to join the station for a weekly show on Sunday afternoons. But on 28 March, a few days before he was due to present the show, O'Grady died suddenly aged 67. Boom described the news of his death as "absolutely shocking". Boom subsequently announced it would repeat O'Grady's Christmas 2022 show on Easter Sunday, at the time he was scheduled to be on air, and following requests by listeners for them to do so.

On 10 October 2023, it was reported that Boom Radio had been added to the DAB multiplex in the Channel Islands.

On 4 December 2023, it was announced that Chris Tarrant would present his first Christmas show for Boom Radio on Boxing Day afternoon. Other highlights over Christmas 2023 would include a musical tribute to Paul O'Grady on Christmas Day, presented by his friend Julian Clary, and a show by Angela Rippon.

On 13 April 2024, Boom Radio announced the launch of a £500,000 advertising campaign on ITV1, its first on the channel. It was also confirmed that Jo Brand had been hired to present a series of programmes in which she would interview prominent television personalities, including Michael Grade.

In December 2024, Boom launched a new jingles package, which had been devised by TM Studios. The package also included a station song, something that was popular on radio stations during the 1980s.

On 1 June 2025, and following the death of presenter John Peters the previous week, Boom played a final edition of his programme, The Vintage Chart, which he had recorded shortly before his death. The programme was preceded by a tribute from David Lloyd, who had been a friend and colleague of Peters' for many years.

On 19 September 2025, Pete Murray celebrated his 100th birthday by presenting an edition of the Boom Top Five at 11am. On 21 September, Boom aired 70 Years of ITV, a two-hour programme celebrating ITV's 70th anniversary, with Jenny Hanley and Sir Trevor McDonald.

On 7 April 2026, it was announced that former Radio 2 producer Malcolm Prince would join Boom to present Malcolm's Musicals and Movies, a Wednesday evening programme dedicated to stage and screen music, from 6 May, with a repeat airing on Boom Light on Saturdays. On 12 May 2026, it was announced that 1970 Eurovision Song Contest winner Dana would present an hour-long Eurovision special on Boom on 14 May ahead of that year's final. Also on 12 May, it was announced that Sandie Shaw would present a two-hour special for Spring Bank Holiday Monday on 25 May.

In June and July 2026, Boom Radio partnered with Times Radio, a station featuring news and discussion, for a six-week promotion deal, whereby both stations would make listeners aware of the other through on-air announcements. In July 2026, it was announced that Boom Radio had reached the final of the Dext Small Business of the Year category at the Lloyds British Business Excellence Awards. In October 2026, Boom Radio released a preview of a television advert, scheduled to appear on ITV, Channel 5 and Sky from November, and part of a £1m television and social media advertising campaign to promote the station.

=== Sister stations ===
==== Boom Light ====
On 3 June 2022, Boom Radio announced plans to launch a spin-off station in July. Boom Light plays music from the 1950s, standards and easy listening, and was initially available online and via smart devices, as well as on DAB in Salisbury with plans to expand its DAB output. The station was launched in response to listener requests for more 1950s music content, and is aimed at those aged 75 and over, although Boom has said it believes there is also a lot of interest in 1950s music among younger listeners. Boom Light has a playlist of 10,000 tracks, and plays music often no longer heard on mainstream radio.

On 2 June 2025, Boom Light was launched on DAB+ in several major UK cities, including London, Birmingham, Cardiff, Manchester, Leeds and Edinburgh, with plans for further expansion. Pete Murray announced the switch-on at 10am. Fran Godfrey and Don Black joined the station as presenters.

==== Boom Rock ====
On 7 January 2024, Boom Radio announced that a sister station, Boom Rock, would be launched in February, playing genres including album rock, hard rock, psychedelic rock, progressive rock, folk rock, new wave and West Coast rock. The station would be available on DAB in Nottingham, as well as online. Boom Rock was launched on 14 February 2024, Boom Radio's third anniversary. Presenters on the station include Gary Burton presenting weekday mid mornings and Nicky Horne, who presents the Friday Rock Show, as well as a revival of his 1970s Capital Radio show Your Mother Wouldn't Like It on Saturday afternoons. Boom Rock's station ID also features the voice of Tommy Vance, who died in 2005, but whose voice was recreated using artificial intelligence with permission from his family.

On 30 March 2026, Boom Radio announced that Boom Rock would start broadcasting on DAB in the London area from 2 April. On 24 September 2026, Boom Radio CEO Phil Riley announced that Boom Rock would close at the end of September as the broadcaster invested £1m in an advertising campaign for its main station. Riley confirmed that the presenting team and music played on Boom Rock would continue to be heard on Boom Radio.

==== Boom 66 ====
On 14 April 2026, Boom announces plans for a one-day pop-up station devoted to the music and events of 1966. Boom 66 will air on 30 July to coincide with the England national football team's 4–2 win against West Germany at the 1966 FIFA World Cup final, and replay music and news stories from that year. On 28 July, it was announced that Boom 66 would be aired on small-scale DAB multiplexes in the West of England.

== Broadcasting ==
Boom Radio went on air against the backdrop of the COVID-19 pandemic and opted to follow a model whereby its presenters were presenting their shows remotely from home-based studios. Riley has described this approach as "taking advantage of what's been happening in lockdown to completely rethink how you run a radio station". Kevin Hilton of the International Broadcasting Convention writes that Boom Radio is believed to be the first national UK radio station not to have a central studio building.

In order to put together the technology needed to establish a radio station with this model of broadcasting, Riley and Lloyd employed the services of Quentin Howard, an executive with experience in launching in excess of 30 stations. Following research, Boom Radio chose RCS Sound Software to host its content. Some of the presenters already had home studios, but for those who did not, a package including a laptop, microphones and acoustic foam was provided to them.

Once the station's infrastructure was established, it was then possible for content to be assembled using scheduling software that enables presenters to record spoken content to correspond with scheduled tracks – known as voice-tracking. Commercials and breaks for news and weather updates are then inserted by an automated system as the shows are broadcast. A live two-minute news bulletin from IRN is broadcast on the hour, followed by a national weather forecast from Radio News Hub. Although Boom Radio's content is automated in this way, many of the presenters record their spoken content shortly before it is aired to enable them to respond to real-time information, such as listener requests, and to provide reviews of the day's newspaper headlines.

== Music content ==
The launch of Boom Radio came at a time when BBC Radio 2, a station favoured by the boomer generation, began to reduce the number of older songs it was playing in an attempt to attract a younger audience, and in particular a demographic it described as "Mood Mums"; women in their 30s and 40s with busy lives and children. On the topic of its BBC rival, Riley has said Boom Radio wants "to step on the toes of Radio 2", adding "Our view is that Radio 2 is almost relentlessly being dragged younger, so that they can appeal to people over the age of 30".

In a statement issued prior to going on air, Boom Radio said that its music output would feature music "from across the decades, peppered with selected contemporary hits". City A.M. describes Boom Radio's music output as including groups and artists such as The Beatles, Tom Jones and ABBA "as well as favourites from contemporary artists" such as Adele and George Ezra.

On 2 December 2023, it was announced that Boom Radio would play the uncensored version of The Pogues' Christmas hit "Fairytale of New York" after 91% of listeners who contributed to a poll said they would not be offended by it. The decision came after a number of radio stations began playing an edited version that removes the homophobic slur in the lyrics.

=== Concerns about Radio 2 spin-off station ===
In February 2024, and following the BBC's announcement that it would launch four new national digital radio stations, including a Radio 2 spin-off playing similar music content, Boom Radio co-founder Phil Riley urged Ofcom to block the planned launch, describing the BBC's decision as a "panic" move to try to win back older listeners. Boom subsequently asked its listeners to write to the BBC and to their MPs to complain about the planned new service, which Boom said "sounds remarkably" like its own.

On 9 July 2024, Ofcom ordered the BBC to pause a planned launch of the service on BBC Sounds pending a full public interest test. Ofcom also announced plans to launch its own investigation to determine whether the launch of the Radio 2 spin-off station would lead to a "significant adverse impact" for stations like Boom. Revised proposals for the spin-off station were submitted to Ofcom on 22 November 2024, but were criticised by Boom's CEO, Phil Riley, after the BBC acknowledged that the station would have an impact on Boom. Riley also suggested the station could have a financial impact on Boom that would means its sister stations, Boom Light and Boom Rock, were no longer financially viable.

On 10 April 2025, Ofcom provisionally indicated that it would reject the BBC's planned spin-off, citing the potential impact on Boom as one of the reasons for this decision. Riley welcomes Ofcom's decision to reject the Radio 2 spin-off, and thanked Boom Radio's listeners for their support.

== Audience ==
Upon its launch Boom Radio described itself as "a new radio station for an adventurous generation" and one that is "run by baby boomers for baby boomers". With an estimated baby boomer population of 14 million at the time of the station's launch, Boom Radio aims to attract half a million listeners within its first two to three years on air.

In October 2021, RAJAR published its first set of audience figures since the COVID pandemic, and the first to include Boom listenership. These showed a weekly audience of 233,000 with an average listening time of eight hours per week. RAJAR figures for the first quarter of 2022 indicated Boom Radio had increased its audience by 20%, with an average weekly listenership of 290,000. Figures for the second quarter of 2022 showed a weekly average audience of 336,000, an increase of 44% on its inaugural figures. RAJAR figures for the final quarter of 2022 showed that as of December 2022, the station was broadcasting to a weekly audience of 531,000, having doubled its audience to half a million in a year.

RAJAR figures for the first quarter of 2023 showed Boom with an average weekly audience of 635,000. Figures published for the second quarter of 2023 showed Boom to have a weekly audience of 641,000, compared to 336,000 listeners during the same quarter of 2022, meaning the station had virtually doubled its audience in a year. Figures for the third quarter of 2023, released on 26 October, showed another increase, from 641,000 weekly listeners to 662,000, giving the station its biggest audience so far. Figures for the final quarter of 2023, released on 1 February 2024, indicated a fall in listener numbers to 627,000 average weekly listeners, 504,000 of them in the over-55 age bracket. Figures for the second quarter of 2025, released on 31 July, indicated a weekly listening audience of 711,000.

=== Ofcom complaints ===
On 15 July 2024, Boom Radio was reprimanded by Ofcom for playing the uncensored version of "You Oughta Know" by Alanis Morissette, which contains the word "fuck", during the afternoon school run after receiving two complaints. Boom responded that the song had been downloaded in error and accepted it should not have played the track but argued that 94% of its listeners are over 55 and its "under 18 audience registers as zero", and therefore it was unlikely that children would have been listening. Boom also commented that Ofcom had not pursued three similar instances of uncensored tracks being played on air that occurred during 2021.

On 18 August 2025, Ofcom ruled that Boom Rock had breached the Broadcasting Code after an incident on 30 May at 6.35pm, when the station had played the Counting Crows track "Spaceman in Tulsa", which contains several expletives. Ofcom described the words as the most offensive language broadcast at a time when children were particularly likely to be listening. In response, Boom said that it "regretted" that the track was "inadvertently broadcast" but argued that its target audience and online status of the station meant that children would be unlikely to be listening.

== All day features ==
On 26 November 2021 the station counted down its Boom Beatles Chart, a top 40 chart of Beatles tracks voted for by its listeners, with the most popular hit being "In My Life". The chart was compiled to coincide with the release of Peter Jackson's documentary series The Beatles: Get Back.

On 14 August 2022, Boom presented a day of programming dedicated to pirate radio to coincide with the 55th anniversary of the Marine, &c., Broadcasting (Offences) Act 1967 that had made pirate radio stations illegal. The programming included shows presented by Johnnie Walker, John Peters (who recreated the last Big L Fab 40 countdown as broadcast on Wonderful Radio London in 1967), Roger Day, Dave Lee Travis, and Keith Skues (with a three-hour show with interviews with Colin Berry, Tony Blackburn, Paul Burnett and Roger Gale).

On 20 November 2022, Boom Radio celebrated the 70th anniversary of the UK Singles Chart, with a day of programming dedicated to the charts presented by John Peters, Simon Bates, Mike Read and David Jensen. The shows included a countdown of the first chart from November 1952 presented by Peters.

On 8 October 2023, Boom Radio celebrated 50 years of commercial radio with a day of programming, including a show presented by Michael Aspel, who presented the morning show on Capital Radio from 1974 to 1984. Other presenters that appeared included Roger Day, who was the first presenter to be heard on Piccadilly Radio when it launched in 1974, Les Ross, the first presenter on Radio Tees in 1975, and John Peters, the first presenter to be heard on Radio Trent in 1975.

A day of special programming to coincide with the 60th anniversary of the launch of Radio Caroline aired on 28 March 2024, with programmes presented by Nick Bailey, Roger Day, Tom Edwards and Emperor Rosko. Keith Skues also featured on the station through the day reading 1964 press coverage of the Radio Caroline launch. Boom's All Time Top 200, a chart voted for by listeners, was presented over the 2024 Easter Weekend, and was noted for including only one song by a female artist in its top 30 – Dusty Springfield's 1966 track "Goin' Back". On 6 May, Boom marked 60 years of Motown with special programmes presented by Jenni Murray and Len Groat.

== One More Dream ==
In January 2026, Boom partnered with Ambassador Cruise Line to launch One More Dream, a project aimed at giving a group, band or solo artist a second chance at fame. The competition was judged by Suzi Quatro, Mike Batt, Tony Hadley and Tony Christie, and received several hundred entries from across the UK. In March 2026, broadcaster Nicky Horne announced that the Monarchs Blues Band, a band with members from North Wales and Cheshire, had won.

== Presenters ==
- Simon Bates
- Don Black
- Roger Day
- Graham Dene
- Steve England
- Fran Godfrey
- David Hamilton
- Jenny Hanley
- Guy Henry
- Nicky Horne
- David Lloyd
- Susie Mathis
- Charles Nove
- Phil Riley
- Les Ross
- Judi Spiers
- Clare Teal
- Graham Torrington

=== Past presenters ===
- David Symonds (February – August 2021)
- Anna Raeburn (February 2021)
- Pete Murray (December 2021; December 2022; June 2025; September 2025)
- Bob Harris (January 2022 – February 2022)
- Esther Rantzen (February 2021 – March 2022)
- Rebecca Wilcox (February 2021 – March 2022)
- Keith Skues (August 2022; October 2023; March 2024)
- Dave Lee Travis (August 2022; December 2022)
- David 'Kid' Jensen (February 2021 – 2023)
- Johnnie Walker (August 2022; December 2022; August 2023; December 2023)
- Mike Read (November 2022; October 2023; January 2024; December 2025; May 2026)
- Paul O'Grady (December 2022)
- Angela Rippon (May 2023; December 2023)
- Paul McKenna (September 2023)
- Michael Aspel (October 2023; December 2024)
- Tom Edwards (October 2023; March 2024)
- Julian Clary (December 2023)
- Stephen McGann (December 2023)
- Chris Tarrant (December 2023)
- Paul Burnett (December 2023; August 2024; October 2024; December 2024; April 2025; May 2025; August 2025; May 2026; July 2026; August 2026)
- Tom Browne (December 2023)
- Emperor Rosko (March 2024; August 2025; August 2026)
- Sir Tim Rice (April 2024; August 2026)
- Jo Brand (April 2024 – May 2024)
- Dame Jenni Murray (May 2024; December 2024)
- Phil Swern (May 2024; August 2024)
- Gyles Brandreth (July 2024; December 2024)
- Tony Prince (January 2025)
- John Peters (February 2021 – May 2025)
- Nina Myskow (May 2025)
- Tony Brandon (December 2025)
- Dave Jamieson (February 2021 – March 2026)
- Dana (May 2026)
- Sandie Shaw (May 2026)
- Matthew Bannister (June 2026)
- Iain Dale (July 2026)
- Garry Richardson (July 2026)
- Ron O'Quinn (July 2026)

== See also ==
- Saga Radio Group, a group of stations aimed at over 50s during the 2000s
- PrimeTime Radio
