= Roger Day =

British DJ

Roger "Twiggy" Day
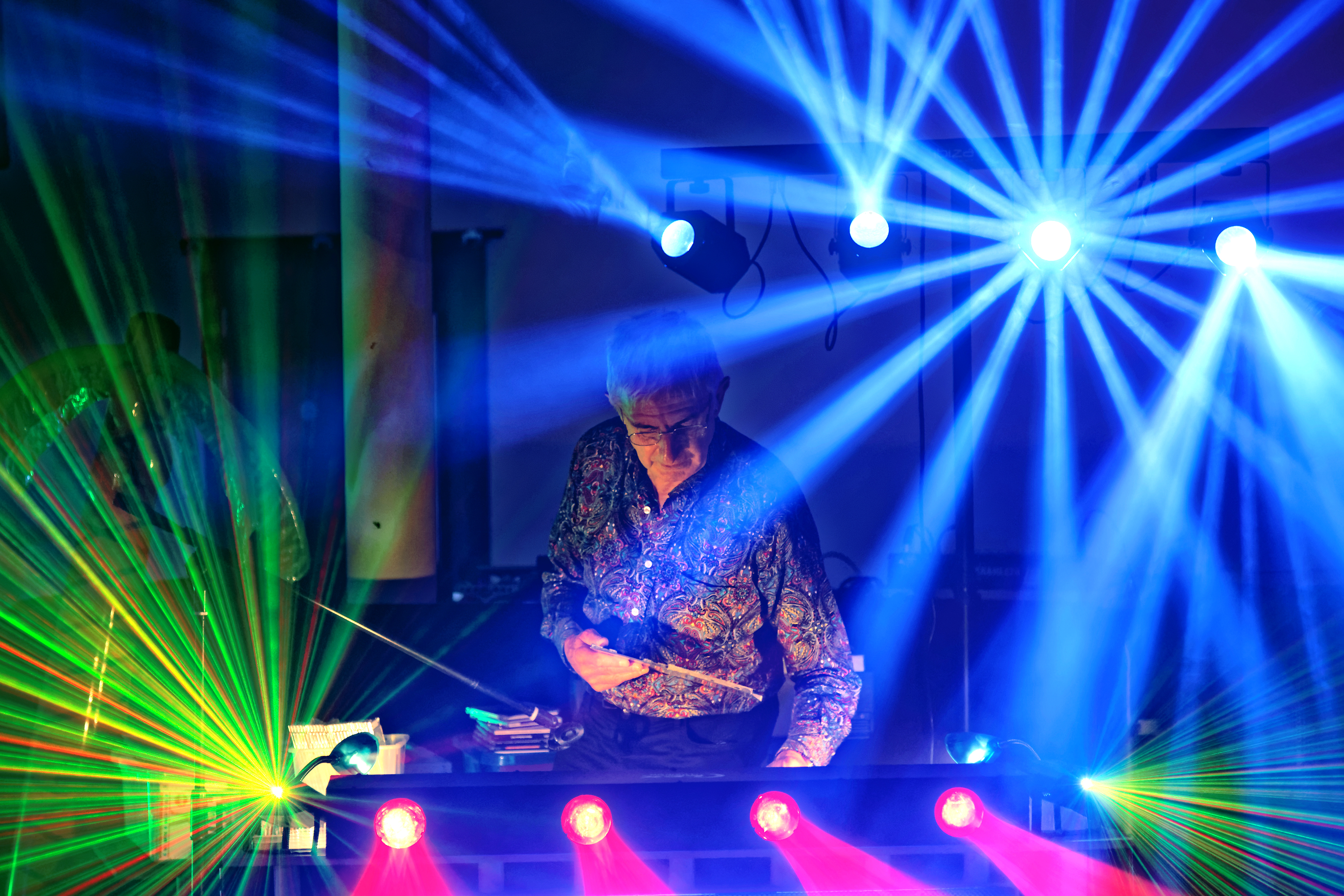
- Roger 'Twiggy' Day in 2016
- Born: Roger Thomas; 29 March 1945 (age 81); Cheltenham, Gloucestershire England
- Occupations: Disc jockey, Radio personality
- Years active: 1966–present

Roger "Twiggy" Day (born Roger Thomas in Cheltenham, Gloucestershire England; 29 March 1945) is a radio broadcaster and DJ who began his career in offshore radio, and was a key pioneer in commercial radio. He later presented on BBC Local Radio across southern England.

== Radio career ==
In March 1966, Day met Dave Cash who arranged for him to DJ with Radio England. Day went live on air in May that year. After Radio England closed down Day joined Radio Caroline and remained with the station even after it was outlawed. In January 1968 his fan club, the Daydreamers Club, was set up and was run by his father Bertie Thomas; by November of that year it had over 2,000 members. Also in 1968, Day was voted the 10th best national DJ by the readers of Disc and Music Echo with his Radio Caroline show voted as 7th best in the country. In the summer of 1968 he started at Radio Luxembourg.

In December 1968. Day compered a number of shows for the Beach Boys during their European tour beginning at the London Palladium. In 1970 he joined Radio North Sea International where he remained for four months. He briefly rejoined Radio Caroline in 1973 and also worked for the United Biscuits Network. On 2 April 1974, Day was the first DJ heard on the morning of the launch of Piccadilly Radio in Manchester.

In 2012, the Roger Day Evening Show, which was broadcast on BBC Local Radio, was nominated for best radio show at the Music Week Awards.

Day moved stations and until 2012 began presenting a daily show on BBC Radio Kent every weekday evening from 7 to 10 pm. The show was heard on six stations (BBC Radio Kent, BBC Sussex, BBC Surrey, BBC Radio Solent, BBC Radio Berkshire and BBC Radio Oxford) in the South and South East of England.

From 2013, Day had a weekly show on BBC Radio Kent, taking over Dave Cash's classic countdown show in 2017 until March 2020, featuring the charts of 1960 to 1979. He continues to do classic charts online. He has also presented an afternoon show on Radio Caroline's Caroline Flashback station online, and a weekday show on Delux Radio.

Day has been a presenter for Boom Radio since its launch in February 2021.
