= Catherine Bott =

British soprano

Catherine Bott (born 11 September 1952) is a British singer and broadcaster.

Following her studies at The King's High School For Girls and Guildhall School of Music and Drama, with Arthur Reckless, she began her career as a member of Swingle II, successors to the baroque-jazz crossover group The Swingle Singers. After two years she left to begin a solo career, specialising at first in medieval, renaissance and baroque music.

She recorded extensively, for example as Dido in Purcell's Dido and Aeneas (with Christopher Hogwood and the Academy of Ancient Music in 1992), with the choir of King's College, Cambridge conducted by Stephen Cleobury in Bach's St. John Passion, as Venus in John Blow's Venus and Adonis with Philip Pickett, and in Monteverdi's L'Incoronazione di Poppea with Sir John Eliot Gardiner. She also enjoyed a sideline as a studio singer, much in demand to record solos on soundtracks for George Fenton, Trevor Jones and Craig Armstrong, among others. She was the singing voice of Elizabeth Bennet in BBC TV's much-admired 1995 production of "Pride and Prejudice", as Colin Firth's Mr Darcy looked on.

Bott performed and recorded more recent repertoire, for example with Sir John Eliot Gardiner in Fauré's Requiem, Vaughan Williams' Sinfonia Antartica, Nielsen's Symphony No. 3 with Bryden Thomson and the London Symphony Orchestra and Royal Scottish National Orchestra respectively. She performed and recorded new works by Michael Nyman, Jonathan Dove, Michael Torke and Errollyn Wallen.

With Lucie Skeaping, Bott presented The Early Music Show on BBC Radio 3 2003-2013, also presenting many Promenade concerts, evening concerts, documentaries and features. In October 2013, Bott joined Classic FM to present a three-year project covering the entire history of classical music. She was a regular presenter of The Full Works Concert 2014-2020, and a Sunday afternoon programme until the end of June 2023. She now introduces live-streamed concerts for Wigmore Hall and the Bournemouth Symphony Orchestra.

Catherine Bott is a Fellow of the Guildhall School of Music and Drama and an Honorary Fellow of Trinity Laban Conservatoire of Music and Dance.
