= Steve England =

British radio producer and disc-jockey

Steve England is a British radio producer and disc-jockey known for his involvement in pirate radio and pioneering production work in radio jingles.

== Biography ==
England was a disc-jockey on the offshore pirate radio stations Radio Caroline, Radio Mi Amigo, and Radio Atlantis where he also became programme director. England then went on to broadcast for one of the first independent local radio stations in the UK, Piccadilly Radio in Manchester.

After spending time as head of commercial production, England started a partnership with Alan Fawkes and set up Alfasound in 1979. England and Alfasound were one of the earliest proponents of jingle packages in the United Kingdom. The company produced many jingle packages for UK and European radio stations from its base in Sale, Greater Manchester; one such package was for the Italian radio station, Radio Nova International.

Alan Fawkes and Steve England parted company in 1997 and England set up his own production company. In 2001, he merged his company with S2Blue.

England also presented on and helped to set up Moorlands Radio, the community radio station for the Staffordshire Moorlands based in Leek, Staffordshire.

As of 2023, England presents weekend shows on Atlantis Radio featuring vintage jingles and 1960s songs.

As of January 2026, England hosts a show on Friday evenings on Boom Radio.
