= Gravity FM =

Community radio station based in Grantham, Lincolnshire

Gravity FM was a community radio station based in Grantham, Lincolnshire. It broadcast full-time since 1 December 2008 on 97.2FM and online, the station had completed its first licence period and, as a result, has obtained a further five year extension from OFCOM, the industry regulator, with similar Key Commitments.

== Broadcast content ==
Gravity FM broadcast content produced by volunteers from the local community. Mainstream daytime programming was music led and included news, traffic, travel and local information. During the evenings the station broadcast a variety of more specialist programs and features.

== Funding and awards ==
Gravity FM had so far been successful in securing funding to maintain its service provision. Like all community radio stations in the UK, it was capped in only being allowed to raise half its income annually from advertising and on-air commercial arrangements. The remainder was found in the form of grants, off-air sponsorship and fundraising.

The Friends of Gravity FM was a charity (registered for tax purposes in the UK) established in 2012 to support the provision of community broadcasting services in the Grantham area. The station had benefited greatly from the donations they had made towards new equipment.
