= Capital (radio network) =

British radio network

- Country: United Kingdom
- Broadcast area: United Kingdom; International (via Online)
- Headquarters: Leicester Square, London
- Branding: The UK's No.1 Hit Music Station

Programming
- Language: English
- Format: CHR

Ownership
- Owner: Global

History
- Launch date: 3 January 2011; 15 years ago
- Replaced: Galaxy Network; The Hit Music Network

Coverage
- Stations: See list

Links
- Webcast: Global Player
- Website: www.capitalfm.com

Capital is a network of twelve independent contemporary hit radio stations in the United Kingdom, broadcasting a mix of local and networked programming. Ten of the stations are owned and operated by Global, while the other two are owned and operated under separate franchise agreements.

As of December 2025, the stations serve a combined weekly audience of 6.8 million listeners and target a core audience in the 15–34 age group; 57% of all listeners are within this demographic. The national version of the network is widely available on Global Player, Freeview, Sky, Freesat, Virgin Media and Digital One DAB. Capital is the fifth most-popular radio network in the UK by listeners, and the second largest of the commercial stations after Heart.

Capital has a playlist which is updated weekly, and up until around February 2022, featured songs from the last one or two years. Since 2022, Capital has started playing older songs from the 2010s, 2000s, and late 1990s, with most of them played on their sister station Capital Anthems; although unlike fellow hit music station BBC Radio 1, it doesn't usually play any rock or alternative music (most alternatives were played on their sister network Radio X) while other genres such as drill and occasional drum and bass were respectively played on Capital Xtra and Capital Dance.

== History ==
=== Capital Radio, GWR and GCap Media ===
Capital started as the independent music radio station for London in the early 1970s.

In the 1990s, Capital Radio became one of the UK's major radio groups via acquisition of a number of local radio stations including Red Dragon FM, BRMB and Power FM. Rival GWR Group also acquired a number of local radio stations in the 1990s, including Leicester Sound, Ram FM, GWR FM, Chiltern FM, Hereward FM, Marcher Sound and Trent FM, which operated as part of the 33-station Mix network.

Capital Radio and GWR Group's merger in 2005 to form GCap Media resulted in the stations being amalgamated into the One Network. This continued until June 2009 when most of the stations, now in the ownership of Global Radio — who had purchased GCap in 2008 — were rebranded as part of The Heart Network. This left Leicester Sound, Ram FM, Red Dragon FM and Trent FM, which, in 2008, were grouped together to form The Hit Music Network with networked content produced in Nottingham, although, apart from The Big Top 40 Show, the networked content did not appear on Red Dragon. In January 2011, these stations were rebranded as part of Capital, with the Leicester, Derby and Nottingham stations merged to form one regional station for the East Midlands.

=== Galaxy ===
The first Galaxy radio station, Galaxy 97.2, was launched in 1990 in South West England – initially broadcasting solely from Bristol – and operated under the Chiltern Radio Group. In 1994 the station won the first regional FM licence and moved frequency to 101.0 MHz, rebranded as Galaxy 101 and expanded coverage to include South Wales. At the same time a second studio was opened in Cardiff to provide some programming alongside the existing Bristol studio. Chrysalis Radio purchased the station in 1996 and, a year later, expanded the network by buying Faze FM's stations: Kiss 102 in Manchester and Kiss 105 in Yorkshire. In 1998, black community station Choice FM was acquired in Birmingham. Chrysalis Radio won the North East regional licence in 1999 and sold the original station, Galaxy 101, to the GWR Group in 2002 (this station is now Kiss 101).

In 2007, Chrysalis Radio was sold to Global Radio and following their subsequent acquisition of GCap in 2008, XFM Scotland and Power FM were rebranded under the Galaxy moniker in November 2008. Another rebrand followed in January 2011 when all Galaxy stations were rebranded as Capital.

=== Capital ===
Within the first five months of the network, Capital's flagship London station regained its position as the most listened-to commercial station in London. However, Manchester, the North East, South Wales and Yorkshire lost listeners, contrasting with Birmingham, Central Scotland and the South Coast where listening figures increased.

On 1 July 2011, Global Radio requested changes to the formats of Capital Birmingham and Capital Scotland, which had inherited obligations from previous owners. This was to enable format consistency within all nine Capital stations. On 17 November 2011, Ofcom approved both format change requests.

On 6 February 2014, Global Radio announced it would be selling two of its Capital stations, in Scotland and South Wales, to Communicorp. Capital's network programming and brand name is still used by both stations under contract.

Two ex-Heart stations were added to the network on 6 May 2014: Capital Cymru (serving Anglesey and Gwynedd) and Capital North West and Wales, broadcasting from Wrexham.

On 18 January 2016, Global added the former Juice FM station in Liverpool to the network, after approval was given to buy the station from UTV Media for £10 million.

In January 2018, Global added the former Juice 107.2 in Brighton and announced it would launch Capital Brighton on 3 September 2018.

In July 2018, Global brought 2BR in Lancashire from UKRD. The station was merged with the Manchester station and joined the network on 8 April 2019.

In February 2019, following Ofcom's decision to relax local content obligations for commercial radio, it was announced Capital would replace its local breakfast and weekend shows with additional networked programming from London as of Monday 8 April 2019. This reduced total weekly hours of local programming on each station from 43 to 15.

Capital Cymru retained its own local breakfast and weekend shows due to separate Welsh-language obligations. In May 2019, the station dropped all networked output and introduced a full schedule of local programming, including additional Welsh-language shows. Capital Cymru also retains the network's branding and much of its CHR music playlist.

Local Drivetime shows were retained, but some are now shared between stations. Local news, traffic updates and advertising is retained across all licence areas.

In September 2019, Quidem, the owners of six local radio stations in the English Midlands, announced it had entered a brand licensing agreement with Global, citing financial losses. Two months later, following Ofcom permission to change the stations' formats, it was confirmed they would merge and join the Capital network on 2 December 2019. Quidem continued to own Capital Mid-Counties as a franchise until August 2021 when Global took ownership, although Communicorp continues to own their franchises.

On 2 November 2022, Capital rebranded their stations to no longer use the word "FM" in their names; FM had already been removed from their on-air branding. The station logos with the Capital FM name and the station's frequency range were replaced with a blue and orange single-word logo, and Capital Xtra's branding had a colour change.

In April 2023, it was announced Capital Scotland (owned by Communicorp) would reintroduce local breakfast, daytime and weekend programming from 2 May 2023, as part of a major expansion of Global's Scottish radio operations.

Capital stations in England ended local and regional programming on 21 February 2025. Scotland and Wales retained their respective local programming.

== List of Capital stations ==
As of 2 December 2019, Capital's regional network consisted of twelve stations.

Years	Capital station	Studios
2014–	Capital Anglesey & Gwynedd	Cardiff
2016–	Capital Liverpool	—N/a
1973–	Capital London	London
2019–2025	Capital Manchester and Lancashire	—N/a
2019–2025	Capital Mid-Counties	—N/a
2019–	Capital Midlands	—N/a
2011–	Capital North East	—N/a
2014–	Capital North West and North Wales	Cardiff
2011–	Capital Scotland (franchise, owned by Communicorp)	Glasgow
2019–	Capital South	—N/a
2011–	Capital South Wales (franchise, owned by Communicorp)	Cardiff
2011–	Capital Yorkshire	—N/a

== Production and programming ==
Capital stations based in Central Scotland and Birmingham produced and transmitted specialist output for the network on Saturday and Sunday overnights respectively. However, in July 2012, this was replaced with content from 95.8 Capital studios in Leicester Square, London, where all the networked programming is now produced. Drivetime programming on weekdays originated from the local stations' studios until February 2025 when Global adopted their new 'nations strategy'. Only Scotland and Wales retained their respective local programming. Capital also broadcasts via a number of DAB ensembles that do not correspond with a local FM station, and as an audio channel on the Digital Terrestrial Television and Digital Satellite platforms. These platforms take a national feed with programming (except adverts) identical to that of 95.8 Capital London.

Prior to January 2011, Leicester Sound, Ram FM and Trent FM shared off-peak programming from Trent's studios in Nottingham, whilst Galaxy programming came from studios in Leeds. Red Dragon FM and Capital were entirely autonomous, producing all of their own output.

The Capital radio network production and station sound was created by former Capital producer Arden Hanley and was then overseen by Chris Nicoll, who also runs production brand Wizz FX, until his departure in 2015 to join Wisebuddah. Howard Ritchie, Helen Austin and Kayne Harrison were the voiceover artists for 95-106 Capital until 2022. Since 2022, Remel London, Dan O'Connell and Becca Dudley are the voiceover artists for the Capital network. The current station sound was created by Reelworld, and Global's inhouse production team, which is led by Ashley Bard.

Virgin Media became the first sponsor of 95-106 Capital. The six-figure deal begun on 4 January 2011, with weekday drive-time shows branded as The Virgin Media Home Run across all nine stations for a six-month period.

The Official Big Top 40, broadcast on Sundays, is simulcast with Capital's sister network, Heart (with the exceptions of both Summertime Ball and Jingle Bell Ball Sundays, where the station carried the backstage access to the event).

=== News ===
All Capital stations broadcast local news updates under the name of Capital Reports, every hour from 6am till 6pm on weekdays and from 6am till noon at weekends.

=== Network opt-outs ===
- In central Scotland, Capital Scotland broadcasts regional programming from Glasgow from 6am–7pm on weekdays and 12pm–4pm at weekends, carrying Capital network programming at other times.
- Capital South Wales, Capital North West and Wales and Capital Cymru carry a dedicated afternoon drivetime show for Wales from Cardiff from 4pm-7pm on weekdays, with Capital network programming at other times.

=== Capital Network Presenters ===
Lineup for national feed (excluding the public/bank holidays):

- Jordan North, Sian Welby & Chris Stark – Capital Breakfast, weekdays 6–10am
- Kemi Rodgers – weekday mid-mornings 10am–1pm
- Aimee Vivian – weekday afternoons 1–4pm
- Will Manning – weekday drivetime 4–7pm & The EE Official Big Top 40 (simulcast across Capital & Heart network) Sundays 4–7pm
- Jimmy Hill – Capital Evening Show, Monday thru Thursdays 7–10pm & Saturday breakfast 9am–12pm
- Sonny Jay – Monday thru Thursday late show, 10pm–1am
- Kem Cetinay – The Capital Weekender, Friday & Saturdays 7–10pm
- Lee Juggurnauth – Monday & Tuesday overnights, 1–4am & The Capital Weekender 10pm-1am
- Joe Hollywood – weekday early breakfast, 4–6am & Sunday breakfast, 9am–12pm
- Tom Watts – Wednesday thru Friday overnights 1–4am, Sunday evenings 7–10pm & main cover presenter
- Lydia Rodford – weekend early breakfast 5–9am (currently on maternity leave)
- Rebecca Daniels – weekend overnights 1–5am
- Jay London – weekend afternoons 12–4pm
- Nada Allali – Sunday late show, 10pm–1am
- Nicola Lashley (cover presenter) currently covering Lydia Rodford’s weekend shows until December.

== Sister stations ==
=== Capital Xtra ===
On 3 October 2013, Global Radio announced that the Capital brand will be extended to form a new nationwide digital rhythmic contemporary radio station by rebranding Choice FM as Capital Xtra. The rebrand took place at 6:01 am on 7 October. Capital Xtra is available on FM in London on 96.9 and 107.1 MHz and nationally on the Digital One DAB multiplex. In September 2019, Capital Xtra received its own national sister station when Capital Xtra Reloaded, formerly an online stream through Global Player, was relaunched as a broadcast radio station, transmitting on Digital One in the DAB+ format and playing rhythmic hits from the recent past.

=== Capital Dance ===
On 1 October 2020, Global launched a new dedicated electronic dance music station broadcast nationally via Digital One in DAB+ and online. The station has its own presented shows on Monday to Saturday afternoons and Monday to Thursday evenings, with former BBC Radio 1Xtra DJ MistaJam heading the station's lineup at launch. Capital Dance previously simulcast the Capital Network's weekend dance show (The Capital Weekender), however on 30 October 2023 this stopped in favor of a new show (Club Capital Dance) hosted by Capital Dance's own presenters. To enable the addition of Capital Dance to Digital One, other Global stations including Capital Xtra Reloaded and Capital UK had their DAB+ bitrate reduced.

=== Capital Chill ===
On 13 February 2023, Global launched Capital Chill to play exclusively chill music, via DAB and online.

=== Capital Anthems ===
Launched on 12 September 2024 alongside 11 other new Global stations, the station features iconic tracks from the past years.

=== Capital (Taylor's Version) ===
This was Capital UK's first ever nationwide pop-up station, which played solely songs from Taylor Swift herself to coincide with the UK leg of The Eras Tour. The pop-up station was replaced by Capital Anthems in September 2024.

== Capital TV ==
Capital TV broadcast on the Sky and Freesat platforms from July 2012, and on Freeview in the Manchester area from October 2012, and was also available online. The channel played non-stop music videos. It closed in October 2018.

== Capital FM Arena ==
The Capital FM Arena was in Nottingham, and was sponsored as part of a deal which began with the predecessor brand Trent FM. In 2016, the naming rights of the Capital FM Arena were handed over to Motorpoint and the arena is now known as Motorpoint Arena Nottingham.

== Help a Capital Child ==
The Capital London charity Help a London Child was founded in 1975 by Richard Attenborough CBE. It is a grant-giving charity which means that twice a year, the charity provides practical and lasting support to groups working with thousands of youngsters aged 18 and under.

In the first year, £8,000 was raised and grants given to 10 charities in Camden. Since its formation, the charity has raised in excess of £22 million in the London area and awarded grants to areas of great need, directly helping over 1.4 million children and young people.

Grants are awarded to refuge and homelessness projects, support groups for children and young people with a disability, special need or an illness, as well as a range of sports, music, drama and leisure activities, holiday play schemes and residential breaks in the UK, cultural activities, supplementary schools, literacy programmes and much more.

It was the winner of Outstanding Contribution to London Lifestyle at the London Lifestyle Awards in 2010. In the same year, the charity allocated a record amount in grants (£1.6 million), supporting 84,000 children and young people across London.

Help a Capital Child was launched as the main charity of the Capital Network. The first annual event took place from 14 to 16 October 2011 with sister station LBC also adopting the charity appeal.
