= Katie Breathwick =

English radio presenter

- Born: Leicester, England
- Education: Uppingham School; Newnham College, Cambridge
- Occupations: Journalist and broadcaster
- Known for: Presenter on Classic FM
- Spouse: Robert Thorogood

Katie Breathwick is a radio journalist and broadcaster. She is a late-night presenter on Classic FM.

== Early life ==
Breathwick was educated at Stoneygate School, Loughborough High School and Uppingham School where she met her husband, Robert Thorogood, the creator of BBC One’s Death in Paradise. As a teenager, she was a chorister at Leicester Cathedral. In 2018 she revealed she once worked as a shop assistant at WHSmith.

Breathwick read Social and Political Sciences at Newnham College, Cambridge, where she was also a member of the Cambridge Footlights. She toured twice nationally with Footlights, once in Some Wood and a Pie (1993) alongside Thorogood, Mark Evans, Georgie Bevan, Dan Mazer and William Sutcliffe, and The Barracuda Jazz Option (1994) with Robert Webb, Dan Mazer, James Bachman and Liz Hurran. In her final year at Cambridge she co-presented a spoof radio show on the student radio station 'for a laugh' and discovered what she wanted to do for the rest of her life.

== Career ==
Breathwick began her broadcasting career in 1997 as a reporter at Radio 106 in Nottingham, a brand new independent regional station covering three counties. From there, she moved to local TV reporting and producing at Central News. In 1999 she joined News Direct 97.3, a rolling news radio station owned by ITN and based at Grays Inn Road in London. She has also hosted talk shows on LBC, both as sole host and as co-presenter with Nick Abbot, Richard Mackney, Mark Dolan and a former contestant on The Apprentice, Tre Azam. In 2005 Breathwick co-presented LBC News 1152 election coverage with veteran Sky News presenter Bob Friend (newscaster).

In 2008 Breathwick moved to Classic FM as the breakfast newsreader, alongside long-running host Simon Bates. In 2015 she became the host of the overnight show at weekends on Classic FM, becoming the market-share leader for that slot in 2018.

Breathwick hosts Q&As every summer at Garsington Opera held on Mark Getty's estate in Buckinghamshire, Wormsley Park.

== Personal life ==
Breathwick is married to Robert Thorogood, the creator of BBC One’s Death In Paradise, whom she met at school. They have two children. Breathwick and her husband co-own their own production company, Brunswick Street Limited.

In 2015, Breathwick stood as a candidate for the Green Party of England and Wales in the local council elections, securing 7% of the vote. In 2024, Breathwick and Thorogood made a political donation through their production company Brunswick Street to Labour Party MP and Treasury minister Emma Reynolds, an ally of Rachel Reeves on the right of the party.
