= Independent National Radio =

National commercial radio stations in the United Kingdom

Independent National Radio (INR) is the official term for the three national commercial radio stations currently or previously broadcasting on analogue radio in the United Kingdom, beginning in 1992. One station was allocated an FM licence, and the other two were allocated AM medium wave frequencies previously used by BBC Radio 3 and BBC Radio 1.

== Background ==
The stations came about following the Broadcasting Act 1990 which allowed for the launch of independent national radio (INR) stations in the United Kingdom. The Radio Authority was mandated to award three INR licences. The FM licence (INR1) had to be for a 'non-pop' station, and one (INR3) had to be for a predominantly speech-based service. The remaining licence (INR2) was to be open to 'all-comers'. The licences were to be awarded to the highest cash bidder, providing that the applicant met criteria set down in the Broadcasting Act.

Plans for a fourth station, using 225 kHz long wave, were mooted in 1996 but were abandoned by the Radio Authority after consultation with the radio industry which found that there was no interest in launching a station on that frequency due to it only covering to a small part of the UK and the associated costs of extending coverage to the whole country. The frequency had originally been allocated to the BBC but, apart from a very brief period many decades earlier, had never been used.

INR licences come with certain privileges and responsibilities that are not shared by Independent Local Radio stations:

- Ofcom mandates a list of transmitters across the UK from which the INR stations must be broadcast.
- The INR licensees are automatically allocated a place on the national Digital One DAB multiplex.
- INR stations are required to carry party political broadcasts during general election periods.

As of 2011, the INR licence holders paid Ofcom a nominal annual fee of £10,000.

== INR stations ==
=== On air ===
- Classic FM (INR1) – 99.9 to 101.9 MHz, first air date 7 September 1992, owned by Global Radio.
- Talksport (INR3) – 1053 kHz and 1089 kHz in most areas (frequencies previously used by BBC Radio 1). First air date 14 February 1995 as Talk Radio UK. Rebranded as Talksport under new ownership in 2000.

=== No longer broadcasting on analogue radio ===
- Virgin Radio/Absolute Radio (INR2) – 1215 kHz medium wave in most areas (frequencies previously used by BBC Radio 3). First air date 30 April 1993 as Virgin 1215. Rebranded as Absolute Radio in 2008; ceased medium wave broadcasts on 20 January 2023.

All three stations are also available nationally on DAB, digital TV and online.
