= Classic FM TV =

- Broadcast area: United Kingdom

Ownership
- Owner: GCap Media

History
- Launched: 26 November 2002
- Closed: 14 December 2007
- Replaced by: oMusic TV (Sky)

Classic FM TV was a television channel owned by GCap Media as a spinoff of British radio station Classic FM. Until 14 December 2007 it was available as a television channel on the Sky Digital satellite and Virgin Media cable TV services. After that, Classic FM TV only broadcast online in the United Kingdom via the Internet.

It claimed itself as the world’s first classical music television channel with programming consisting of soft and relaxing classical music videos 24-hours a day.

The channel was removed from Sky and Virgin Media on 14 December 2007. It also become online-only. On 17 December 2007 a new channel called oMusic TV launched on Sky in Classic FM TV's slot.
