= John Brunning =

British composer

John Brunning is an English radio presenter, musician and composer.

In 1986, he began broadcasting on local radio, and joined Classic FM when the station launched, and is the only presenter to have worked on the station continuously since it began broadcasting in 1992. In the course of this association, he has presented the Drive and Chart programmes, as well as Smooth Classics. He presented Classic FM Drive for the final time on 14 April 2023, and he continues to present various programmes for the station.

== Composition ==
Brunning's 2006 composition, Pie Jesu, was first recorded by the vocal group All Angels, and has since been recorded by several other artistes including the King's Singers (2010). The Pie Jesu is one of seven movements that together form the oratorio Amazing Day and another piece from this work, his setting of "Ave Maria", was recorded by the Welsh soprano Katherine Jenkins (2011). He has also composed several pieces for guitar, and Sahara and Romance No.1 (2010) have been recorded by both Xuefei Yang and Craig Ogden. Ogden gave the first performance of 'Concerto Magna Carta' for guitar and small orchestra in 2015, and has since recorded the slow movement from it.

== Personal life ==
He is married with two children.

== Albums ==
- Amazing Day
