= Leicester Sound =

- Leicester; England
- Broadcast area: Leicestershire
- Frequencies: FM: 105.4 MHz; DAB; Freeview
- RDS: LEIC SND

Programming
- Format: Contemporary hit radio

Ownership
- Owner: Global

History
- First air date: 7 September 1984
- Last air date: 3 January 2011
- Former names: Sound FM (1988–1991)
- Former frequencies: 97.1 FM; 103.2 FM; 1260 MW

Leicester Sound was an Independent Local Radio station which broadcast to Leicestershire. The station merged with two other East Midlands stations, Trent FM and Ram FM to form Capital FM East Midlands (part of Global's Capital FM Network) on Monday, 3 January 2011.

== Background ==
Leicester Sound was launched by the owners of Radio Trent on 7 September 1984, eleven months after Leicestershire's first ILR station, Centre Radio, went into receivership and ceased broadcasting. The new station broadcast from Centre's Granville House studios and on Centre's frequencies of 1260 MW and 97.1 FM. The FM frequency was moved to 103.2 MHz in 1986 with medium wave broadcasts continuing until October 1988. In the same year, the station was renamed as Sound FM, before reverting to its original branding in 1991.

In January 1992, Leicester Sound was bought out by Midlands Radio plc. Within a year, the group was taken over by Capital Radio who sold the station, along with Trent FM and Mercia Sound to the GWR Group. In January 1997, Leicester Sound's frequency changed from 103.2 to 105.4 FM, offering a stronger signal, which could be heard in most of Leicestershire from a transmitter near Billesdon. In February 2002, the station moved to new studios at the Meridian Business Park in Leicester.

Leicester Sound broadcast its last local programme on Friday 31 December 2010 ahead of the station's merger with Trent FM and Ram FM to form Capital FM East Midlands as part of Global Radio's plans to launch The Capital FM Network. The new station began broadcasting at 10 am on Monday 3 January 2011.

== Notable past presenters ==
- Robin Banks
- Rae Earl
- Sara Blizzard (now with BBC East Midlands Today)
- Jeremy Kyle (presenter The Jeremy Kyle Show)
- Graham Torrington (later with BBC Radio Bristol, Smooth Radio, now at Boom Radio)
- David Lloyd (now at Boom Radio)
- John Peters (now at Boom Radio)
- Matt Faulkner (now with BBC Radio Somerset)
