= Midlands Radio =

British radio operator

Midlands Radio plc was an independent radio operator, which operated seven radio licences in Birmingham, Coventry, Leicester, Nottingham and surrounding areas in the United Kingdom.

== Stations owned ==
=== FM ===
- BRMB
- Leicester Sound
- Radio Trent
- Mercia Sound

=== AM ===
- GEM AM – operated on the medium wave frequencies of Radio Trent.
- Xtra AM – operated on the medium wave frequencies of BRMB and Mercia.

== History ==
Under the control of Ron Coles, Midlands Radio plc was floated on the full stock market in 1990.

Following the introduction of the Broadcasting Act of 1990, a number of major groups began to lead a consolidation of the market. This led to Midlands Radio plc being purchased by for 18 million by Capital Radio plc, who then sold Trent, Leicester Sound, and Mercia Sound to GWR in 1993, but kept hold of BRMB.

As Mercia and its medium wave frequency were sold in the bundle, GWR announced that 1359 kHz would be rebranded as Classic Gold. This meant Xtra AM would only continue in Birmingham, and due to the presenters urging Coventry listeners to retune to the Birmingham frequency GWR pulled the plug on Xtra AM in Coventry earlier than provisionally agreed.

Under the new ownership, the FM stations were re-launched under GWR's Better Music Mix uniformed format. GEM continued to be live and local 24 hours a day until 1997, when Tony Lyman's programme was networked from 12 midday – 3 p.m. across most of the Midlands and the Home Counties on the Classic Gold network, and at this point the name of the station was changed to Classic Gold GEM. More shared programming was heard and the name GEM finally disappeared on Friday 3 August 2007 at 7.00 p.m., when Classic Gold GEM became part of the Gold Network, following the merger of Classic Gold and Capital Gold. The only remaining local programme (12-4pm weekdays) was pre-recorded.

GWR later merged with Capital Radio to form GCap Media, and GCap was then acquired by Global Radio based in Leicester Square, London with the FM stations adopting national brands such as Heart and Capital.
