= Radio2XS =

radio2XS was re-branded in 2023 as 2XS Radio. It is programmed and edited in Chesterfield, England and uses the on-air slogan "A.Different.Music.Mix.".

Playing "New Music and 70 Years of Rock’n'roll", the station was formed in 2002 in Sheffield's Workstation arts and media space by Jeff Cooper, a former DJ and programmer at Hallam FM, Rock FM, Radio Clyde, BBC Radio and others.

The station produces its own live music ('The Barn Sessions', named after the 17th-century Peak District barn where many of them are recorded) and has featured Travis, Idlewild, Cornershop, Alabama 3, Catatonia, Adema, Morcheeba, The Abbots, Johnny Dowd, Earl Brutus and other bands.

The station is staffed by several veteran English DJs besides Cooper, including Guy Morris, Ed Parnell and Caroline Woodruff. It is fully licensed from the UK by music copyright bodies PPL and MCPS-PRS.
