= Ram FM =

Coordinates: 52.923812°N 1.477901°W

Derby; England
- Broadcast area: Central and southern Derbyshire
- Frequency: 102.8 MHz
- RDS: RAM FM

Programming
- Format: Contemporary Hit Radio

Ownership
- Owner: Global

History
- First air date: 3 March 1987
- Last air date: 3 January 2011
- Former names: Radio Trent 945 (1987–1994)
- Former frequencies: 945 MW

Ram FM was an Independent Local Radio station, which broadcast to central and southern parts of Derbyshire on 102.8 FM. The station merged with two other East Midlands stations, Trent FM and Leicester Sound to form Capital FM East Midlands (part of Global's Capital FM Network) on Monday 3 January 2011.

== History ==
After a period of test transmissions, the station began life as "Radio Trent 945" at 6:00am on Tuesday 3 March 1987 on 102.8FM, also broadcasting on AM 945 kHz. Andy Marriott launched the station with a recording of a message from His Grace the Duke of Devonshire. The first song played was Simply Red – Do The Right Thing.

In October 1988, the AM frequency was launched as a separate oldies service called GEM AM; that service also continues today now known as Gold.

In March 1994, the FM service was rebranded "Ram FM" by new owners GWR Group plc, and continued to broadcast from studios under the Assembly Rooms in Derby Market Place. The station moved premises in 1999 to offices at Norwich Union House on nearby Iron Gate.

Ram FM broadcast its very last local programme on Friday 31 December 2010 ahead of the station's merger with Trent FM and Leicester Sound to form Capital FM East Midlands as part of Global Radio's launch of The Capital FM Network. The new station officially began broadcasting at 10am on Monday 3 January 2011. Former Ram FM weekday breakfast presenters Dean 'Dino' Weatherbed & Pete Allen presented weekday drivetime shows for the regional station before becoming presenters of Capital Breakfast with Dino & Pete in April 2012.
