= Classic FM (UK) =

British radio station

- London; United Kingdom
- Frequencies: FM: 99.9 – 101.9 (England, Northern Ireland, Scotland, Wales and parts of North East Ireland); DAB+: 11D (England/Northern Ireland/North East Ireland/Wales); DAB+: 12A (Scotland and The Channel Islands); Freeview: 731; Freesat: 721; Sky (UK only): 0106; Virgin Media: 922
- RDS: Classic

Programming
- Language: English
- Format: Classical

Ownership
- Owner: Global
- Sister stations: Classic FM Calm; Classic FM Movies

History
- First air date: 7 September 1992; 34 years ago

Links
- Website: classicfm.com

Classic FM is one of the United Kingdom's three Independent National Radio stations and is owned and operated by Global Media & Entertainment (Global). The station broadcasts classical music and was launched in 1992.

Classic FM was the first national classical music station to launch since the opening of BBC Radio 3 25 years earlier on 30 September 1967, and 46 years since the opening of Radio 3's predecessor of The Third Programme on 29 September 1946.

As of May 2025, the station has a weekly audience of 4.7 million listeners, according to RAJAR.

== Overview ==
Classic FM broadcasts nationally on 100-102 FM, DAB+, Freeview, satellite and cable television and is available internationally by streaming audio over the internet. It is the only Independent National Radio station to broadcast on FM, alongside BBC Radios 1, 2, 3 and 4. In addition to playing a wide repertoire of traditional classical music, the station also features more modern orchestral pieces such as film scores, television theme music and video game music.

== History ==
The idea for a national, commercial FM network devoted to classical music originated with the management at GWR Group, an entrepreneurial group of UK commercial radio stations. It had been operating a trial programme on its AM frequencies in Wiltshire and Bristol, testing audience reaction to a regular drive-time programme of popular classical music. It proved successful, and the company's CEO, Ralph Bernard, and programme director, Michael Bukht, drew up the plans for a national station.

Meanwhile, Brian Brolly, formerly the CEO of Andrew Lloyd Webber's Really Useful Group, had a similar idea in 1990. After failing to raise sufficient funds for the project, Brolly's consortium was approached by the GWR Group, and the two merged. The UK Government had decided to award several new national radio licences, and invited tenders. Brolly had brought the idea to Rick Senat, the long-serving head of business affairs in London for Warner Bros. and current owner of Hammer Films. Initially rejected by Warner Bros., Senat showed the project to the President of Time Warner International Broadcasting, Tom McGrath, a former classical musician and conductor. Time Warner agreed to back the project, but was prohibited under UK law of that time from owning more than a 25% interest.

The Radio Authority had granted an exemption so that Time Warner could hold more than 25%, provided a UK citizen/corporation was larger in the shareholding group.

The station launched at 06:00 on Monday 7 September 1992, after two months of test transmissions using a recording of birdsong. Nick Bailey presented the first programme, and Zadok the Priest by George Frideric Handel was the first piece to be played. Other launch presenters included Henry Kelly, Susannah Simons, Petroc Trelawny and Adrian Love.

Global, the UK's largest radio station ownership group, now owns the station. Classic FM has broadcast from its current studios, on the second floor of 30 Leicester Square in central London, since March 2006. The first programme to be broadcast live from there was Mark Griffiths' programme on 26 March 2006.

In April and May 2017, High Score, the first series on UK radio dedicated to video game music, was first broadcast on Classic FM. According to the station's website, it became "the most popular programme on 'Listen Again' in Classic FM's 25-year history". It was presented by composer Jessica Curry.

On 2 January 2024, Classic FM switched from being broadcast in 128 kbit/s stereo DAB to being broadcast in 64 kbit/s stereo DAB+.

=== Spin-off stations ===
On 9 September 2024, it was announced that Classic FM would receive spin-off stations. They were launched on 12 September 2024. Both stations have no presenters and runs a 24/7 automated output (Calm for relaxing music and Movies for movie soundtrack).

On 16 October 2026, Classic FM launched their first-ever pop-up station dedicated to classical Christmas music, which launch alongside Smooth Christmas.

== Current notable presenters ==
Source:.

=== Regular presenters ===
- Alexander Armstrong
- Katie Breathwick
- Joanna Gosling
- Charlotte Hawkins
- John Humphrys
- Aled Jones
- Myleene Klass
- Stephen Mangan
- Anne-Marie Minhall
- Jonathan Ross
- Zeb Soanes
- Ritula Shah
- Margherita Taylor
- Alan Titchmarsh
- Dan Walker
- Daniel Middleton

=== Occasional presenters ===
- Catherine Bott
- John Brunning
- Brian Cox
- Dr Alex George
- Karthi Gnanasegaram
- David Mellor
- Gareth Malone
- Andrew Marr
- Sir Trevor McDonald
- Chi-chi Nwanoku
- Nicholas Owen
- Moira Stuart
- John Suchet
- Debbie Wiseman
- Fiona Bruce
- Lloyd Griffith

== Shows ==
=== Hall of Fame ===
Classic FM's "Hall of Fame" is broadcast annually over the four days of the Easter weekend. First broadcast in 1996, the show counts down the 300 most-popular pieces as voted for by listeners, culminating in the number one on the evening of Easter Monday.

The number one spot was occupied until 2001 by Max Bruch's Violin Concerto No. 1, and then by Rachmaninoff's Piano Concerto No. 2. In 2006 the top spot was taken by Mozart's Clarinet Concerto. From 2007 to 2010, the top place on the Hall of Fame was taken by Ralph Vaughan Williams's The Lark Ascending. The 2011 "Hall of Fame" saw Rachmaninov's Piano Concerto No. 2 return to the top spot, ending Vaughan Williams' four-year run, and held the position again in 2012 and 2013. In 2014 The Lark Ascending replaced Rachmaninov, which slipped back to number 2 and remained number 1 through to 2017.

In 2018, the top spot was taken by Pyotr Ilyich Tchaikovsky's 1812 Overture, Rachmaninov's Piano Concerto No. 2 was a non-mover in second place, and Vaughan Williams' The Lark Ascending descended to third place after a four-year run at no. 1.

In the 2019 Hall of Fame, Vaughan Williams's The Lark Ascending reclaimed the top spot, followed by Rachmaninoff's Piano Concerto No. 2 and Edward Elgar's Enigma Variations at second and third respectively. 2020 and 2021's Hall Of Fame also saw The Lark Ascending voted the most popular piece by Classic FM listeners.

=== Nation's Favourite Christmas Carol ===
Classic FM broadcasts the "Nation's Favourite Christmas Carol" in a similar format to the "Hall of Fame". The show counts down the thirty most popular Christmas carols every Christmas Day between 13:00 and 15:00, as voted for by listeners. It began in 2001, with "In the Bleak Midwinter" winning the first vote. The following year, "Silent Night" was voted the nation's favourite. The vote has been won by "O Holy Night" in almost every year since then, with the only other winner being "Silent Night" in 2014 and 2015.

=== Classic FM chart ===
From the station's launch in September 1992 until the end of 2019, Classic FM broadcast a weekly classical chart show. Initially transmitted on Saturday mornings, the programme later moved to Sunday evening. The final chart show was aired on 21 December 2019.

=== Playlist ===
At the heart of Classic FM's identity from the start was its playlist of popular classics. It was compiled over the first few years by Robin Ray, who drew up a list of more than 50,000 classical music pieces and rated them for popular appeal, which forms the basis for the Classic FM playlist. Selector software developed by RCS Inc in the United States, which had previously been used only for pop music, was adapted for classical music by Howard, Ray and others to include many more fields and categories, and deal with many more rotation rules to create a playlist from the 50,000 listed tracks; the first "officially broadcast" track was "Zadok the Priest".

== Composer in residence ==
Classic FM named a composer in residence in 2004, Joby Talbot. Talbot composed a piece, scored for up to five instruments, each month for the year of his residence. The compositions were also premiered on Classic FM. The twelve compositions form part of a larger piece, released on a CD entitled Once Around the Sun on 23 May 2005.

Talbot was succeeded by Patrick Hawes as the new composer in residence in 2006 and composed the piano album Towards the Light during his residency. In May 2008 Howard Goodall, the composer and television presenter, joined Classic FM as the station's latest composer in residence. Goodall also presented a new programme on the station, Howard Goodall on..., beginning on 7 June 2008.

Debbie Wiseman was named composer in residence in 2015. Her first album commissioned for Classic FM was The Musical Zodiac, which was released the following year.

== Sponsorship ==
Classic FM were sponsors of Queens Park Rangers Football Club between 1992 and 1994.

== Related content ==
=== Charity: The Classic FM Foundation ===
The Classic FM Foundation is a grant giving charity which raises money to fund music education and music therapy projects working with children and adults throughout the UK. It was founded in 2006 as Classic FM Music Makers, and was renamed in 2010.

Hayley Westenra is an ambassador of the charity, which also receives support from many famous faces from the world of classical music and entertainment.

Throughout the year The Classic FM Foundation holds fundraising events including concerts, sponsored treks and an annual appeal.

=== Other media ===
- Classic FM ran an internet television (and formerly digital TV) channel playing classical music videos, Classic FM TV.
- Classic FM published a monthly magazine, Classic FM Magazine, which presented news and reviews.
- Classic FM has also issued a series of CDs with selected classical pieces, notably two CDs of Classic FM Music for Babies (playtime and bedtime) and Classic FM Music for Bathtime.
- Classic FM produces a podcast called Case Notes (winner of the British Podcast Awards Best True Crime Podcast 2019), presenting stories from the history of classical music.
- Classic FM became the first radio station to be an ISP in 1999, providing free dial-up internet access, online web hosting and "classicfm.net" e-mail addresses via "Classic Freenet" up until the late 2000s .

=== Jazz ===
On 25 December 2006, Classic FM opened "theJazz", a station devoted to jazz music. The station closed in March 2008, and Classic FM itself then took on the broadcasting of a jazz programme every night between midnight and 02:00, until September 2008.

- Classic FM Calm: a station devoted to chill-out classical music.
- Classic FM Movies: a station devoted to songs from Movie Soundtracks.
