= Timeline of the Heart Radio Network =

A timeline of notable events relating to Heart, a 22-strong network of hot adult contemporary commercial radio stations operated by Global.

== 1990s ==
- 1994
  - 6 September – 100.7 Heart FM begins broadcasting, providing a regional service of soft adult contemporary music to the West Midlands, similar to Smooth Radio today.
- 1995
  - 5 September – Heart 106.2 launches in London, broadcasting a 'Hot AC' music format.
- 1996
  - 100.7 Heart FM’s music format is modified to Hot AC.

== 2000s ==
- 2005
  - 29 August – Heart 106 replaces Century 106 in the East Midlands.
- 2006
  - Simon Beale starts presenting the weeknight late show.
  - 15 December – Heart joins Freeview on Channel 728. It was then broadcasting on MUX 2, but following the digital switchover in the late 2000s/early 2010s it transferred to the COM4 multiplex, along with many other channels on the platform. It is now on the COM5 multiplex.
- 2007
  - 25 June – Chrysalis Radio announces the sale of the three Heart stations, along with its sister stations The Arrow, LBC and Galaxy, to Global Radio for £170 million.
- 2008
  - 28 April – The Heart stations begin networking off-peak programmes from Heart 106.2 in London. There are now only ten hours of local programming during weekdays and four hours on Saturday and Sunday.
- 2009
  - 5 January – Chiltern Radio, Hereward FM, Radio Broadland, Q103, Northants 96, SGR Colchester, SGR Ipswich, and Horizon Radio are all rebranded as Heart after earlier being acquired by Global Radio.
  - 23 March – Fox FM, GWR FM Bath, GWR Bristol, GWR FM Wiltshire, Champion 103, Essex FM, Gemini FM, Severn Sound, Lantern FM, Coast 96.3, Plymouth Sound, Orchard FM, South Hams Radio, Wirral's Buzz and 2-Ten FM are all rebranded as Heart.
  - May – Orion Media purchases, among other stations, Heart 106 in the East Midlands from Global Radio. A franchise agreement with Global allows Orion to continue to use the Heart identity and carry networked programming from London.
  - 13 June – Spice Girls singer Emma Bunton joins, and begins hosting a pre-recorded show on Heart in the Saturday afternoon slot 4pm – 7pm.
  - 22 June – Invicta FM, Southern FM, 2CR, Ocean FM and 103.4 Marcher Sound are rebranded as Heart.

== 2010s ==
- 2010
  - 21 June – Global Radio announces plans to reduce the number of its local Heart stations from 33 to 15 as part of a reorganisation. The stations will continue to broadcast their own breakfast and drivetime shows – alongside local news bulletins – but all other output will come from London. A further two stations owned by Global will also be subsumed into the Heart network.
  - 30 June – Heart Solent replaces Heart Hampshire and Heart Dorset & New Forest.
  - 2 July –
    - Heart Cambridgeshire replaces Heart Peterborough and Heart Cambridge.
    - Heart North Wales and West replaces Heart North Wales Coast, Heart Cheshire and North East Wales and Heart Wirral.
  - 9 July – Heart Thames Valley replaces Heart Oxfordshire and Heart Berkshire.
  - 16 July –
    - Heart Four Counties replaces Heart Northants, Heart Milton Keynes, Heart Dunstable and Heart Bedford and Dunstable, later Milton Keynes.
    - Heart West Country replaces Heart Bristol, Heart Bath and Heart Somerset.
  - 26 July –
    - Hertfordshire station Mercury 96.6 becomes part of the Heart network and is relaunched as Heart Hertfordshire. The station operates under a franchise agreement with Mercury's owner Adventure Radio.
    - Heart Essex replaces Heart Essex (Chelmsford & Southend), Heart Colchester and Ten 17.
    - Heart Sussex and Surrey replaces Heart Sussex and Mercury FM.
  - 27 August – Heart Devon replaces Heart Exeter and Heart Torbay, Heart Plymouth, Heart North Devon and Heart South Devon.
  - 3 September – Heart East Anglia replaces Heart Norwich and Heart Ipswich.
  - 9 November – Orion Media announces that it will launch a brand new station for the East Midlands called Gem 106. Consequently, Heart 106 will end at the end of the year.
- 2011
  - 1 January – Gem 106 replaces Heart East Midlands at midnight – the first Heart station to cease broadcasting.
  - Jason Donovan joins to present the Sunday morning show.
- 2012
  - 7 May – Heart South West replaces Atlantic FM. A separate Drivetime show for Cornwall continues to air as part of Ofcom speech content requirements.
  - 5 August – Emma Willis and Stephen Mulhern join to co-host the Sunday morning show.
  - 12 October – Heart launches a spin-off television channel called Heart TV on Freesat and Sky. It later launched on Freeview on the Manchester multiplex the following year, although it has since been removed from there in 2016 and continued to broadcast for a further two years on Freesat, Sky and online.
  - Roberto joins to present the weekday evening show.
- 2013
  - 14 March – Jenni Falconer joins to present the Sunday early show. She replaces Jason Donovan who takes a break from the network to tour in the musical Priscilla: Queen of the Desert.
  - 23 June – Simon Beale presents the weeknight late show for the final time. He moves to the overnight show, which until May 2014, features an all-80s music playlist.
  - Following the closure of all-but one of the regional digital multiplexes, Heart Digital is wound down.
- 2014
  - 20 January – Global Radio is found to be in breach of their license remit for Heart South West in Cornwall after a listener complained to Ofcom that there was not enough local news and speech to make it a fully local station.
  - 6 May –
    - The Real Radio network is rebranded as Heart.
    - Heart North West and Wales and Heart Cymru relaunch as Capital North West and Wales and Capital Cymru following the relaunch of Real Radio North Wales as Heart North Wales.
  - 3 August - Jason Donovan re-joins to present a Sunday evening 80s show.
- 2015
  - No events.
- 2016
  - 29 February – Heart Extra begins broadcasting.
  - 12 November–27 December – Heart Extra was rebranded as Heart Extra Xmas, and focused on an all-Christmas music playlist. This was repeated in 2017, 2018 and 2019.
- 2017
  - 16 January – Sian Welby replaces Roberto as host of the weekday evening show.
  - 14 February – Heart replaces its "more music variety" slogan, which it had used since 1996, with "turn up the feel good!". The jingle "this is Heart", used for many years beforehand, still remains to this day. Prior to this, the station used this slogan during Heart's Happy Hour, which featured a mixture of club classics, party anthems and disco hits, and aired during peak times on most Mondays to Thursdays, at 11am with Toby Anstis and 2pm with Matt Wilkinson.
  - 14 March – Heart 80s begins broadcasting and replaces Heart Extra on free-to-air satellite.
  - September — Heart begins introducing some of its songs by playing remixes of its iconic jingle using sounds that match the sounds of that song before it was officially played. Initially, this only applied to recently released songs, but in later years this also applied to a small number of older songs on the station, despite them being released several years beforehand.
- 2018
  - January –
    - Heart removes music from the 1970s and 1980s from the main station to allow the presenters to play a broader variety of modern-day "hot adult-contemporary" music. The main station would now only play music from those eras for competitions and events, such as Christmas, as well as when some songs from those eras re-enter the UK music charts.
    - Heart's Club Classics began airing for three hours on Friday & Saturday evenings only, rather than one to two hours every evening (except Sunday). Removing all disco-era music from the programme allows the presenters to play a broader variety of modern-day club classics, although a small number of 80s club classics can still be played during the programme.
  - 13–14 January – Heart makes changes to its weekend schedule. Lilah Parsons takes over the weekend late show, Rochelle Humes joins to present the Saturday afternoon programme and Emma Bunton takes over the Sunday evening show from Jason Donovan.
  - 5 March – Cumbrian station The Bay is relaunched as Heart North Lancashire & Cumbria following Global's purchase of the station from CN Group.
  - 5 July – It is announced that Ellie Taylor and Anna Whitehouse will present a new talk show on Heart on Sunday nights from 10pm–1am.
  - 11 October – After six years on air, Heart TV ceased broadcasting on its anniversary.
- 2019
  - 26 February – Global announces plans to replace the regional breakfast shows on Capital, Heart and Smooth with a single national breakfast show for each network. Heart's new breakfast show will launch later in the year. The number of regional drivetime shows will also be reduced.
  - 22 March – Annaliese Dayes leaves
  - 8 April – Pandora Christie joins to replace Toby Anstis as presenter of the mid-morning show and host Saturday Club Classics. Anstis moves to Club Classics on Friday evenings.
    - Heart's Happy Hour, which aired for the last time a few months earlier, was replaced with Heart's Feel Good Five, at 11am every weekday when Pandora plays five songs from mainly the same music format as Heart's Happy Hour.
  - 20 May – Global confirms around 70 local presenters, mostly freelance, will leave the Heart network with the end of local breakfast and weekend output. Seventeen presenters will host the regional Drivetime shows from June.
  - 31 May –
    - Ten Heart stations cease local broadcasting and merge into four stations in the east, south, west and north west of England. Across the network, all local Heart Breakfast shows aired their final programmes.
    - The Time Tunnel, which was aired at 9am on weekday mornings when regional presenters played six songs in a row from a specific year (and occasionally a seventh song was played), was played for the final time before the time slot for Heart's Time Tunnel changed to 3am, 7 days a week.
    - BOB fm ceases broadcasting, after it was sold to Communicorp, and merges with Heart Hertfordshire to form a single countywide station.
  - 3 June – Heart Breakfast with Jamie Theakston and Amanda Holden launches, replacing the local Heart Breakfast shows. The number of local and regional Drivetime shows is cut from 23 to ten.
  - 21 June – Another Heart spin-off station, Heart Dance, launches.
  - 28 August – Global launches Heart 90s.
  - 30 August – Global launches Heart 70s.

== 2020s ==
- 2020
  - 12 March – Heart Extra ceases broadcasting at midnight – it is replaced by a full-time national 'Heart UK' feed.
- 2021
  - 2 March – Global Radio is given Ofcom approval to drop the Heart Nightly News programme from stations in the network previously owned by GMG Radio. As Real Radio, the stations were required to provide extended news content, but Global successfully argued listeners do not want to hear the programme. Heart also no longer has to commit to 24-hour news. The stations concerned are Heart Scotland, Heart South Wales, Heart North and Mid Wales, Heart North West, Heart North East, Heart Yorkshire and Heart Cornwall; all were previously operated under the Real Radio, name apart from Heart Cornwall.
- 2022
  - January – Heart's Club Classics extends its on-air hours, now finishing an hour later, at 11pm.
  - 20 May – Heart 00s launches, broadcasting nationally on Digital One.
- 2023
  - May - Heart Scotland reintroduces local programming on weekdays from 6:30am-7pm and weekends from 12pm-4pm as part of Global's expansion into its Scottish operations, with Des Clarke and Jennifer Reoch moving to the new breakfast slot from previously hosting drivetime on the station.
- 2024
  - 12 September – Heart launches three new spin-off stations: Heart Love (playing exclusively love-songs), Heart Musicals (playing exclusively songs from Musicals) and Heart 10s (playing exclusively songs from the 2010s era).
- 2025
  - 21 February – Heart stations in England will end all local and regional programming. Scotland and Wales will retain their current levels of non-networked programming.
  - 24 February – JK and Kelly Brook begins hosting the England-wide programme that was previously not networked - Heart Drive
  - 1 March - Olly Murs joins to co-host the new Saturday breakfast show with Mark Wright who previously hosted on the Saturday afternoon programme. Vicky Pattison replaces Mark on Saturday afternoons.
  - 11 August - Heart Scotland make changes to its Breakfast programme to add two new presenters, rebranding the show to Heart Breakfast With Des Clarke, Adele Cunningham and Grado, dropping Jennifer Recoch from the network entirely.
- ’’’2026’’’
  - 23 September - Heart Plus was introduced as a brand new monthly/yearly subscription service via the Global Player app to remove all ads plus plenty of other features as a Heart Plus user. This service was also included in all radio stations operated by Global.
