= List of Global Group stations =

Global Radio owns and operates a number of radio stations in the United Kingdom:

Station name	Based in	FM transmission area(s)	Original air date
Capital Birmingham	Birmingham	West Midlands	1 January 1995
Capital Cymru	Wrexham	Gwynedd and Anglesey	11 December 1998
Capital East Midlands	Nottingham	Derbyshire, Leicestershire and Nottinghamshire	3 January 2011
Capital Liverpool	Liverpool	Liverpool, Merseyside	18 January 2016
Capital London	London	London	16 October 1973
Capital Manchester	Salford	Cheshire, Lancashire, Liverpool and Manchester	16 October 1994
Capital North East	Gateshead	North East England	1 June 1999
Capital North West and Wales	Wrexham	Cheshire, Wirral, Wrexham County Borough, Flintshire, Denbighshire and Conwy County Borough	2 July 2010
Capital Scotland	Glasgow	Central and Southern Scotland	19 November 1999
Capital South Coast	Fareham	South Hampshire	4 December 1988
Capital South Wales	Cardiff	South East Wales	11 April 1980
Capital Yorkshire	Leeds	East, South and West Yorkshire	14 February 1997
Capital Xtra	London	United Kingdom	31 March 1990
Smooth Chill	London	London (DAB)	21 February 2005
Classic FM	London	United Kingdom	7 September 1992
Capital Brighton	Brighton	Brighton and Hove	27 March 1998
Gold	London	East Midlands, London and Manchester (AM), London, Manchester and Yorkshire (DAB), United Kingdom (Digital TV)	28 November 1988
Heart Cambridgeshire	Peterborough	Cambridgeshire, Huntingdonshire and eastern Northamptonshire	2 July 2010
Heart East Anglia	Norwich	Norfolk and Suffolk	3 September 2010
Heart Essex	Chelmsford	Essex and East Hertfordshire	26 July 2010
Heart Four Counties	Dunstable	Bedfordshire, Buckinghamshire, Hertfordshire and Northamptonshire	16 July 2010
Heart Gloucestershire	Gloucester	Gloucestershire	23 October 1980
Heart Hertfordshire	Hertfordshire	St Albans, Hemel Hempstead and Watford	22 October 1994
Heart Kent	Whitstable	Kent	1 October 1984
Heart London	London	London	5 September 1995
Heart North East	Gateshead	North East England	1 September 1994
Heart North Wales	Wrexham	North and Mid Wales	4 January 2011
Heart North West	Salford	North West England	8 September 1998
Heart Scotland	Glasgow	Central and Southern Scotland	16 September 1994
Heart Solent	Fareham	East Dorset, Hampshire (South/West), Isle of Wight and West Sussex	30 July 2010
Heart South Wales	Cardiff	South and West Wales	3 October 2000
Heart South West	Exeter	Barnstaple, Cornwall, Exeter, Plymouth, South Hams, Torbay	27 August 2010
Heart Sussex and Surrey	Brighton	Sussex and Surrey	26 July 2010
Heart Thames Valley	Reading	Berkshire, Hampshire (North) and Oxfordshire	9 July 2010
Heart West Country	Bristol	Bath, Bristol and Somerset	16 July 2010
Heart West Midlands	Birmingham	Birmingham and the West Midlands	6 September 1994
Heart Wiltshire	Swindon	Swindon and Wiltshire (West)	12 October 1982
Heart Yorkshire	Leeds	South and West Yorkshire	25 March 2002
LBC	London	United Kingdom	8 October 1973
LBC News	London	United Kingdom	5 October 1994
Smooth East Midlands	Nottingham	East Midlands	26 March 2007
Smooth Scotland	Glasgow	Glasgow	26 March 2007
Smooth London	London	London	26 March 2007
Smooth North East	Gateshead	North East England	8 January 2008
Smooth North West	Salford	North West England	1 September 1994
Smooth West Midlands	Birmingham	West Midlands	26 March 2007
Radio X	London	London, Manchester & National DAB	21 September 2015
Riviera Radio	Monaco	Monaco, Monaco and South of France DAB & 106.5FM	21 July 2025
