= The One Network =

Former British radio network

- Company type: Defunct brand of Global Radio
- Industry: Broadcasting
- Founded: 2005
- Defunct: 2009
- Headquarters: United Kingdom
- Products: Local Radio
- Owner: GCap Media
- Website: haventyouheard.co.uk musicradio.com

The One Network was the collective name for thirty-eight regional Independent Local Radio licences operated by GCap Media in the United Kingdom. It was formed from the combination of GWR Group's 'The Mix Network' and Capital Radio Group's 'The Capital Radio Network' when the companies merged in 2005. Its main regional radio network rival was the Big City Network, owned by Bauer Group.

It was announced in September 2008 that most of The One Network would be re-branded 'Heart', this being completed by June 2009 with seven retaining their name as a new Hit Music Network, and Power FM becoming Galaxy South Coast, as part of the Galaxy Network. The One Network was subsequently folded into the Heart Network or The Hit Music Network, both owned by Global, and programming aligned accordingly. In January 2011, the last remaining "heritage" radio stations owned by Global and operating as The Hit Music Network were merged with The Galaxy Network and rebranded under the Capital FM name becoming The Capital FM Network.

Only a handful of the original One Network stations in the English Midlands, sold to Orion Media, remained (see below) until they were merged to create Free Radio.

== History ==
The origin of The One Network stemmed from the merger of GWR Group's The Mix Network and Capital Radio's Capital FM Network. On 1 August 2007 there was a change to the logo and sound of ex-Capital stations to harmonise with former GWR stations.

The One Network (previously 'The Mix Network') was created by GWR Group in attempt to create a national radio network on minimal cost by simulcasting the same programmes across all stations at off-peak times of day. All of GWR's networked stations used the same branding and presentation design, alongside similar slogans, initially "today's better music mix", later "today's best mix" and "the best mix of the 80s, 90s and today."

All centrally produced programming and playlists were broadcast from GWR FM Bristol (later Leicester Square, London at Capital FM's studios), and songs were broadcast simultaneously as neighbouring group stations, albeit with the exception of advertisements and local station identities/slogans, pre-recorded weather and brief social action or What's On inserts. Many avid listeners were disappointed by GWR's approach to networking programmes and reducing local content, but GWR felt that networking was the way forward and as a result, GWR gained much financial success, mainly due to the group's long held philosophy of heavily researching the average person's listening habits and tastes. Such practices were led by Group chairman Ralph Bernard, who oversaw the creation of the tightly formatted sound where popular Top 40 chart hits and ex-Top 40 songs were blended in with older hits. Despite the changes of schedule and management, the stations continued to be commercial market leader in the areas in which they operated. To increase the listener's perception of each station's local output, GWR came up with 'The Black Thunders', often Mitsubishi 4x4s that travel around local events promoting the station they were allocated to.

The Mix also ran for a short while as a station on its own nationally on Sky Digital taking the same format as the other stations, but was unsuccessful even though it was promoted on the FM stations.

A similar concept of syndicating programmes across local radio stations had previously been used by the Marcher Radio Group bouquet of stations, which eventually became part of The One Network. In addition to The One Network's networked programmes from Bristol, the Marcher stations simulcast many of its sub-regional programming throughout its four local licences.

=== Capital FM Network ===
Capital FM Network was the collective brand name of local radio stations owned by Capital Radio, all purchased between 1993 and 1998. The stations were roughly based around the format of the company's London based station Capital FM and were linked by sharing the same logo. Stations under the brand were Fox FM (Oxfordshire), Red Dragon FM (South Wales), Power FM (South Coast), Southern FM (Sussex), Beat 106 (Central Scotland), BRMB (Birmingham) and Invicta FM (Kent). The stations still used these logos until September 2007 and were closely linked until 2005. Due to falling listening figures Capital FM was removed from the network and re-branded Capital 95.8. The other stations then fell under the hands of the One Network.

The One Network's logo was initially an amalgamation of the two original logos, utilising the Mix Network's symbol and the Capital FM Network font. In July 2007, a unified look for all the One Network stations was adopted, covering everything from car stickers and on-stage branding to letterheads and screensavers, based on a visual identity of green and pink bubbles. The One Network's logo was then adapted to become the logo for the new, but now defunct "Hit Music Network"

== Reformat of the station sound ==
Ahead of the breakup of the network and rebranding of its stations, the One Network stations were split up into three groups:

Network One - Stations that were to become Heart; these carried the slogan "More Music Variety" and adopted AC/Hot AC formats more similar in tone to Heart services. (Most stations in the network, e.g. Fox FM, GWR FM, Invicta FM, Beacon Radio Shropshire*)

Network Two - Stations which retained a CHR format, and used the slogan "(TSA's) Hit Music Station" - these would go on to form the Hit Music Network after the other stations converted to Heart in 2009. Some of these were made Heart in July 2010 (Mercury Herts, Mercury 102.7, Ten-17) The rest of the stations (including Trent FM, Leicester Sound, Red Dragon FM) are now part of the Capital network.

Network Three - A group of stations in the West Midlands that went on to be bought by Orion Media after competition issues required their divestment - these stations were initially part of Network Two from Nottingham, but on being split off for sale, the network feed for these stations (Beacon Radio, Mercia, Wyvern) came from BRMB in Birmingham - These stations ceased carrying Global content and are now known as Free Radio as of March 2012.

- Beacon Radio Shropshire was, at a time, separate to the West Midlands station. It broadcast Local breakfast and drive, taking the Network One feed. Beacon Radio West Midlands broadcast local breakfast and drive, taking the Network Three feed. Beacon Radio Shropshire did not go on to become Heart - the Beacon services were ultimately sold to Orion and became Free Radio.

== Programmes ==
Main syndicated programmes across the network included:

- The Big Top 40 Show (Sunday 4pm to 7pm) presented by Richard Clarke and Kat Shoob - now on Heart with different presenters
- Kevin Hughes (formerly Music Control - Weekdays 7pm to 10pm) presented by Kevin Hughes. The 'Music Control' name was dropped on 30 June 2008.
- The Wind Down (2008–2009). Love songs & dedications presented by Northants 96 presenter Cat James. Occupying the 10pm to 1am slot that "Late Night Love" used.
- Pat Sharp (2008–2009)- Saturdays 12.00pm to 3.00pm. (Replaced The Jeremy Kyle Show)
- Music On Demand (every night 1am to 6am Sun-Fri, 1am to 7am Sat) presented by Dan Wood or Andy Henly
- Philippa Collins (2008–2009) - network presenter for the majority of One Network stations at 10.00am to 1pm.
- Club Classics (Friday and Saturday 7pm to 12am) presented by Gaz Wesley
- Sunday Night with Jason Donovan (Sunday 7pm to 10pm) presented by Jason Donovan - later on Heart
- The Entertainment Edge (2007–2008) presented by Ryan Seacrest.
- Late Night Love (1995–2008) a phone-in show presented by Graham Torrington.
- The Jeremy Kyle Show (2007–2008)

On Friday and Saturday evenings the network formerly split in some areas, with two shows being sent simultaneously. The local stations could choose which programme they wished to broadcast depending upon their audience. The shows on the split networks were:

- Non-Stop Party (Friday 10pm to 1am) presented by Toni Phillips
- School Daze (Friday 10pm to 1am) presented by Trevor Marshall
- Hairbrush Divas (Saturday 7pm to 10pm) presented by Sally Bailey
- Party Friday/Saturday (Friday and Saturday evenings) presented by Howard Ritchie

== Slogans ==
- 1994 A mix of the 70s, 80s and the best of today
- 1995 Station name - A better music mix - from the 70s, 80s and today
- 1997 Today's better music mix
- 2001 Station name - "Today's best mix"
- 2004 "Today's best mix, today's best variety" - "More music, less talk" - "The best mix of the 80s, 90s and today"
- 2007 On-air "Today's best mix" and "Haven't you heard?" The additional tagline of "Haven't you heard?", used on website and advertising only - not used on air, appears to have disappeared from the individual station's websites as of March 2008.
- 2008 "TSA's Hit Music Station" - As of 2009 stations within the Hit Music Network have adopted this slogan.
- 2008 "More Music Variety" - A majority of One Network stations adopted this slogan in June 2008 and it was then adapted for the wider Heart network, along with "this is Heart" ("London's Heart" in the capital).

== Content delivery ==
On the previous Mix Network, stations were traditionally supplied syndicated content using a dedicated satellite network, which proved costly and relatively inflexible. Network show presenters would have to travel to the GWR Group head office in Passage Street, Bristol to broadcast across the network. In 2004, the GWR Group commissioned Thus to design and implement an upgrade to allow broadcasts across The Mix Network to be delivered using an MPLS IP VPN meaning that content could not only be delivered from any station in the group to the whole network, but also to individual groups of stations excluding the rest of the network if desired.

Content was delivered around their IP network using a system designed in-house by GWR Group, called BLAST. BLAST can automatically adjust to any problems during broadcast; it would drop an audio stream from stereo to mono to save bandwidth if it realises contention and if a packet is dropped BLAST will stretch the audio stream by 26 milliseconds to fill.

The network shows for all the "More Music Variety" One Network stations were broadcast from GCap Media studios, Leicester Square, London (now the studio used for Gold network programming).

== Stations ==
The One Network consisted of thirty eight regional contractors, previously owned by GWR and Capital Radio, and prior to that, mostly independent. All of the stations in the network broadcast the same programming in off-peak times, with most local programming allotted in daytime hours. On air, there was no reference to a national network (except during some competitions); just plainly the regional name. Besides advertisements, slogans, and ten second pre-recorded weather and What's On/social action inserts (to satisfy the demands of regulator Ofcom), weekday networked programmes were identical across all stations. On Saturday evenings, stations either broadcast 'Hairbrush Divas' or 'Party Anthems' dependent on the target audience. All of the thirty-eight stations used the same generic imaging, with exception of the sung station-names. These were produced by Music4.

=== Former GWR Group stations ===
- 2-Ten FM
- 2CR
- Beacon Radio
- Wirral's Buzz
- Champion
- 96.9 Chiltern FM
- 97.6 Chiltern FM
- Coast
- Essex FM
- GWR Bath
- GWR Bristol
- GWR Wiltshire
- Gemini FM
- Hereward FM
- Horizon Radio
- Lantern FM
- Leicester Sound
- Marcher Sound
- Mercia
- Mercury FM
- Northants 96
- Orchard FM
- Plymouth Sound
- Q103
- Radio Broadland
- RAM FM
- SGR Colchester
- SGR FM
- Severn Sound
- South Hams Radio
- Ten-17
- Trent FM
- Wyvern FM

=== Former Capital Group stations ===
- Beat 106
- BRMB
- Capital FM
- Fox FM
- Invicta FM
- Ocean FM
- Power FM
- Red Dragon FM
- Southern FM

== The end of The One Network ==
=== Rebranded stations ===
Following Global Radio's takeover of GCap, it was announced that One Network stations would be integrated into Global's Heart Network and Galaxy Network brands.

Date of rebrand	Old name	New name
November 21, 2008	Power FM	Galaxy South Coast
January 5, 2009	Chiltern FM	Heart Dunstable
January 5, 2009	Horizon Radio	Heart Milton Keynes
January 5, 2009	Hereward FM	Heart Peterborough
January 5, 2009	Northants 96	Heart Northants
January 5, 2009	Q103	Heart Cambridge
January 5, 2009	Radio Broadland	Heart Norwich
January 5, 2009	SGR Colchester	Heart Colchester
January 5, 2009	SGR-FM	Heart Ipswich
March 23, 2009	2-Ten FM	Heart Berkshire
March 23, 2009	Fox FM	Heart Oxfordshire
March 23, 2009	GWR Bath	Heart Bath
March 23, 2009	GWR Bristol	Heart Bristol
March 23, 2009	GWR Wiltshire	Heart Wiltshire
March 23, 2009	Gemini FM	Heart Exeter and Heart Torbay
March 23, 2009	Lantern FM	Heart North Devon
March 23, 2009	Orchard FM	Heart Somerset
March 23, 2009	Plymouth Sound	Heart Plymouth
March 23, 2009	Severn Sound	Heart Gloucestershire
March 23, 2009	South Hams Radio	Heart South Devon
June 22, 2009	2CR FM	Heart Dorset & New Forest
June 22, 2009	Champion	Heart Cymru
June 22, 2009	Coast	Heart North Wales Coast
June 22, 2009	Essex FM	Heart Essex
June 22, 2009	Invicta FM	Heart Kent
June 22, 2009	Marcher Sound	Heart Cheshire and North East Wales
June 22, 2009	Ocean FM	Heart Hampshire
June 22, 2009	Southern FM	Heart Sussex
June 22, 2009	Wirral's Buzz	Heart Wirral

=== Hit Music Network ===
The only One Network stations to survive the Heart/Galaxy re-brand were Mercury FM, Red Dragon FM, RAM FM, Ten 17, Trent FM and Leicester Sound, which joined Capital 95.8 to become the Hit Music network. This is because all these stations apart from Red Dragon served areas where Heart was already available on FM or are in a major urban area.

Red Dragon and Capital produced all of their own programming, while Mercury, RAM, Ten-17 and Leicester Sound took networked programming from Trent FM's studios when not carrying their own locally split output..

In 2010, Ten-17 and Mercury FM were rebranded Heart as part of the reorganisation of the 33 local Heart stations into a network of 15 larger regional services; as a result the HMN consisted of Capital, Red Dragon and the three stations in the East Midlands; Trent, RAM FM and Leicester Sound. In January 2011, these stations were merged with The Galaxy Network and rebranded under the Capital FM name becoming The Capital FM Network.

=== Sold stations ===
The West Midlands stations BRMB, Beacon, Mercia and Wyvern, which also serve an area where Heart is already available, were sold because Global already owns Heart and Galaxy in this region. However, it has also been said that these stations would be sold because the newly merged company (Global and GCap) would have too much control in the West Midlands area.

It was announced in April 2009 that Bauer Radio were interested in the stations, however, in May 2009, the stations were sold to Orion Media, a company backed by Lloyds Development Capital and Phil Riley.

== See also ==
- Global Radio
