= 1986 in British radio =

This is a list of events in British radio during 1986.

== Events ==
- The Home Office sanctions six experiments of split programming on Independent Local Radio. Up to ten hours a week of split programming is allowed. These include Welsh language programmes on Marcher Sound, Asian programming on Leicester Sound and rugby league commentary on Viking Radio.
- A European-wide re-organisation of band 2 of the VHF band comes into effect in July 1987. In preparation for this, 1986 sees many local stations change their VHF/FM frequency.

=== January ===
- 5 January – Michael Parkinson takes over as host of Desert Island Discs following the death last year of Roy Plomley.

=== February ===
- No events

=== March ===
- 30 March – Bruno Brookes replaces Richard Skinner as host of BBC Radio 1's Top 40 show.

=== April ===
- 7 April – Derek Jameson takes over The Radio 2 Breakfast Show breakfast show from Ken Bruce.
- 18 April – Mike Read presents his final Radio 1 Breakfast Show after five years in the hot seat.

=== May ===
- 5 May – Mike Smith takes over the Radio 1 breakfast show. The same day also sees Radio 1 begin broadcasting on weekdays 30 minutes earlier, at 5:30 am.

=== June ===
- 28 June – At midday, Portsmouth station Radio Victory stops broadcasting after more than ten years on air, three months before its broadcast licence is due to expire. The previous year the Independent Broadcasting Authority had announced that it would not renew the station's licence.

=== July ===
- 24 July – Pirate Radio 4 returns for a second run of three more editions and is again broadcast on the VHF/FM frequencies of BBC Radio 4 with the usual Radio 4 schedule continuing on long wave. The programme is shorter in length than last year, being on air from 9:05 am until 10:45 am.

=== August ===
- 25 August – An early evening service of specialist music programmes launches on the BBC's four local radio stations in Yorkshire. The programmes are broadcast on weeknights between 6 pm and 7:30 pm.

=== September ===
- 30 September – BBC Radio Jersey begins experimental broadcasting of States of Jersey proceedings. The broadcasts are made a permanent feature from 25 November.

=== October ===
- 1 October – Downtown Radio's broadcast area is expanded when it begins broadcasting to the north western area of Northern Ireland.
- 12 October – Ocean Sound begins broadcasting. It replaces Radio Victory in East Hampshire, but also covers Southampton, Winchester and the Isle of Wight. Ocean Sound launches as a split frequency service – Ocean Sound West on 103.2 FM and 1557 AM and Ocean Sound East operates as the replacement for Radio Victory on 97.5 FM and 1170 AM – due to management identifying two potential audiences: one familiar with commercial radio (in the East area), and one largely acquainted with the BBC (the West area). Ocean Sound East launches with a livelier sound than the West service although both services share breakfast and evening programmes with split programming airing during daytime.

=== November ===
- Undated in November – Following its purchase of Northants 96, Chiltern Radio launches a networked service called The Hot FM. The service is broadcast on three ILR licenses with local programming restricted to mid-mornings.
- 30 November – Northants 96 launches at 10 am and becomes part of The Hot FM.

=== December ===
- 24 December – John Timpson presents the Today programme on BBC Radio 4 for the final time.
- 28 December – Apna Hi Ghar Samajhiye (Make Yourself at Home) is broadcast on BBC Radio 4 for the final time. It had been broadcast on Radio 4 and the BBC Home Service every Sunday morning since 1965.

== Station debuts ==
- 12 October – Ocean Sound
- 5 November – BBC Essex
- 30 November – Northants 96

== Changes of station frequency ==
Station	Moved from	Moved to
Radio Hallam	95.9 (Rotherham), 95.2 (Sheffield)	96.1 (Rotherham), 97.4 (Sheffield)
Signal Radio	104.3	102.6
Pennine Radio	95.2	97.5
BBC Radio Cleveland	96.6FM	95.0FM
Radio Tees	95.0FM	96.6FM
BBC Radio Humberside	96.9FM	95.9FM
Viking Radio	102.7FM	96.9FM
BRMB	94.8FM	96.4FM
Leicester Sound	97.1FM	103.2FM
Severn Sound	95.0FM	102.4FM
Southern Sound	103.5FM	103.4FM

== Programme debuts ==
- 4 January – Loose Ends on BBC Radio 4 (1986–Present)
- 8 March – Take Me To Your Reader on BBC Radio 4 (1986)
- 14 July – Counterpoint on BBC Radio 4 (1986–Present)
- 24 July – Huddwinks on BBC Radio 2 (1986, 1988)
- 8 September – Talkback on BBC Radio Ulster (1986–present)
- J. Kingston Platt's Showbiz Handbook on BBC Radio 4 (1986, 1993)

== Continuing radio programmes ==
=== 1940s ===
- Sunday Half Hour (1940–2018)
- Desert Island Discs (1942–Present)
- Down Your Way (1946–1992)
- Letter from America (1946–2004)
- Woman's Hour (1946–Present)
- A Book at Bedtime (1949–Present)

=== 1950s ===
- The Archers (1950–Present)
- The Today Programme (1957–Present)
- Sing Something Simple (1959–2001)
- Your Hundred Best Tunes (1959–2007)

=== 1960s ===
- Farming Today (1960–Present)
- In Touch (1961–Present)
- The World at One (1965–Present)
- The Official Chart (1967–Present)
- Just a Minute (1967–Present)
- The Living World (1968–Present)
- The Organist Entertains (1969–2018)

=== 1970s ===
- PM (1970–Present)
- Start the Week (1970–Present)
- Week Ending (1970–1998)
- You and Yours (1970–Present)
- I'm Sorry I Haven't a Clue (1972–Present)
- Good Morning Scotland (1973–Present)
- Kaleidoscope (1973–1998)
- Newsbeat (1973–Present)
- The News Huddlines (1975–2001)
- File on 4 (1977–Present)
- Money Box (1977–Present)
- The News Quiz (1977–Present)
- Breakaway (1979–1998)
- Feedback (1979–Present)
- The Food Programme (1979–Present)
- Science in Action (1979–Present)

=== 1980s ===
- Radio Active (1980–1987)
- In Business (1983–Present)
- Sounds of the 60s (1983–Present)
- Delve Special (1984–1987)
- After Henry (1985–1989)

== Ending this year ==
- Unknown – Pirate Radio Four on BBC Radio 4 (1985–1986)

== Closing this year ==
- 28 June – Radio Victory (1975–1986)

== Births ==
- 1 February – Tom Deacon, comedian and broadcast presenter
- 25 February – Jameela Jamil, model and broadcast presenter
- 19 April – Ashley Storrie, Scottish comedian and broadcast presenter
- 8 July – Alice Levine, broadcast presenter and style guru
- 9 September – Nikki Bedi née Vijaykar, broadcast presenter

== Deaths ==
- 19 March – Elisabeth Barker, 75, current affairs radio administrator
- 29 November – Ronald Baddiley, 64, actor
- 8 December – Henry Reed, 72, radio dramatist, poet, parodist, translator and journalist

== See also ==
- 1986 in British music
- 1986 in British television
- 1986 in the United Kingdom
- List of British films of 1986
