= Heart East =

Regional radio station in Milton Keynes, England

- Milton Keynes; United Kingdom
- Broadcast area: East of England
- Frequencies: FM: Cambridgeshire: 102.7 (Peterborough), 103.0 (Cambridge), DAB: 11C (Cambridgeshire), 12D (Peterborough); East Anglia: 96.4 (King's Lynn) 97.1 (Ipswich) 97.4 (Haverhill and Newmarket) 102.4 (Great Yarmouth, Norwich and north Suffolk) DAB: 10B (Norfolk); Essex: 96.1 (Colchester and Ipswich) 96.3 (Basildon) 97.5 (Southend), 101.7 (Harlow and Epping Forest) 102.6 (Chelmsford) DAB: 12D (Essex); Four Counties: 96.6 (Northampton, Towcester), 96.9 (Sandy and Bedford) 97.6 (Luton and Dunstable) 103.3 (Milton Keynes and Buckingham), DAB: 10D (Herts, Beds and Bucks) 10C (Northamptonshire)
- RDS: HEART
- Branding: This is Heart

Programming
- Format: Hot Adult Contemporary
- Network: Heart

Ownership
- Owner: Global

History
- First air date: 3 June 2019

Links
- Website: (Heart East localised websites); Bedford; Cambridgeshire; Colchester; Dunstable; Essex; Harlow; Milton Keynes; Norfolk; Northamptonshire; Peterborough; Suffolk

Heart East is a regional radio station owned and operated by Global as part of the Heart network. It broadcast to the East of England from studios in Milton Keynes.

The station launched on 3 June 2019, following a merger of four Heart stations in Cambridgeshire, East Anglia, Essex and the Four Counties.

== History ==
Under relaxed OFCOM requirements for local content on commercial radio, Heart East is permitted to share all programmes between ten licences located in the ITV Anglia broadcast region.

Previously, these licences broadcast separate stations:

- The first Independent Local Radio station to launch in the region was Radio Orwell in October 1975, broadcasting from Ipswich and serving Suffolk and north Essex. Orwell's owners, Suffolk Group Radio, went onto launch a separate station for west Suffolk, Saxon Radio, from Bury St Edmonds in November 1982. The two Suffolk stations were merged in 1992 to form SGR FM.
- Hereward Radio began broadcasting from Peterborough in July 1980, serving Cambridgeshire, south Lincolnshire and west Norfolk. From October 1984, Hereward began serving Northamptonshire, but due to financial difficulties, the station withdrew from the county and the IBA readvertised the licence separately.
- Essex Radio began broadcasting in September 1981, initially from Southend-on-Sea before moving to Chelmsford in 2004.
- 97.6 Chiltern FM began broadcasting from Dunstable in October 1981, serving north west and central Hertfordshire, south Bedfordshire and east Buckinghamshire.
- 96.9 Chiltern FM began broadcasting from Bedford in June 1982, serving north Bedfordshire, north Hertfordshire and west Cambridgeshire.
- Radio Broadland began broadcasting from Norwich in October 1984, serving Norfolk and north Suffolk.
- Northants 96 began broadcasting from Northampton in November 1986, serving Northamptonshire.
- Q103 began broadcasting from Cambridge in February 1989, covering the Cambridge, Newmarket and Haverhill areas.
- Horizon Radio began broadcasting from Milton Keynes in October 1989, serving north Buckinghamshire.
- Ten-17 began broadcasting from Harlow in May 1993, serving east Hertfordshire and west Essex. Initially reliant on Essex FM for most of its output, it later expanded into a self-sustaining service. It was briefly known as Mercury 101.7 before reverting to Ten-17, after being brought by GWR.
- SGR Colchester began broadcasting from Colchester in October 1993, providing a split opt-out service for the area from its sister station in Suffolk.

By the early 1990s, these stations fell into the ownership of four regional radio groups, namely Chiltern Radio Network, the Essex FM Group, East Anglian Radio and Mid-Anglia Radio. Eventually, all four of these groups were brought by the GWR Group (later GCap Media), which was taken over by Global in 2008.

In 2009, nine of the stations were rebranded as part of the rollout of the Heart network across 29 local radio stations owned by Global. Hereward FM, Northants 96, Q103, Radio Broadland, Horizon Radio and SGR relaunched in January, followed by Essex FM in June. By this point, local programming had been reduced to ten hours on weekdays and four hours at weekends.

The exception was Ten-17, which was part of a separate Hit Music Network, combining its local output from Harlow with networked programming from Nottingham.

During the summer of 2010, Global merged the ten stations in the east of England to four - with Ten-17 closing and joining the Heart network as a result:

- Heart Cambridgeshire - formed from the Peterborough and Cambridgeshire stations, broadcasting from Cambridge
- Heart East Anglia - formed from the Norfolk and Suffolk stations, broadcasting from Norwich
- Heart Essex - formed from Ten-17 in Harlow and Heart's stations in Chelmsford & Southend and Colchester, broadcasting from Chelmsford
- Heart Four Counties - formed from the Northamptonshire, Milton Keynes, Dunstable and Bedford stations, broadcasting from Dunstable

Local programming was further cut to seven hours on weekdays, although localised news bulletins, bumpers (ex. "Across Milton Keynes" was announced on 103.3, whilst similar bumpers were used on other transmitters), traffic updates and advertising continued to air as opt-outs. The Cambridgeshire and Four Counties stations latterly moved from Peterborough and Dunstable to Cambridge and Milton Keynes respectively.

On 26 February 2019, following OFCOM's decision to relax local content obligations from commercial radio, Global announced it would merge the four Heart stations into one.

As of June 2019, regional programming consists of a three-hour Drivetime show on weekdays, alongside localised opt-outs for news bulletins, traffic updates and advertising. Local breakfast and weekend shows were replaced with network programming from London.

Global's studio centres in Cambridge, Chelmsford and Norwich were closed, although local newsgathering and sales staff were retained. Across the four stations, fifteen local presenters left the Heart network.

As of 24 February 2025, all programming originates from Global's London headquarters, including Heart Drive, presented each weekday by JK and Kelly Brook.

== News ==
Cambridgeshire, East Anglia, Essex and the Four Counties receive localised news broadcasts hourly from 6am-7pm on weekdays and 6am-12 midday at weekends.

Journalists within the East of England also produce bulletins for the Communicorp owned Heart Hertfordshire.
