= Neil 'Roberto' Williams =

British radio presenter, voice over and DJ

Roberto
- Born: 20 July 1978 (age 48); Edmonton, London, England
- Occupations: Radio presenter, television presenter, voice-over, DJ
- Employer: Nation Broadcasting (current); ● Global Media & Entertainment (former)
- Website: robertoonline.co.uk

Neil Williams (born 20 July 1978), known by his stage name Roberto, is a British radio presenter, television presenter, voice-over artist, event host and DJ. He currently hosts the breakfast show on Nation 80s.

Roberto has been a presenter on numerous Global-owned stations including Capital, Heart, Heart 80s and Smooth Radio.

He is best known for his shows on Heart and Heart 80s.

After leaving Heart 80s at the end of 2023, he was heard on Smooth Radio covering Early Breakfast and various other shows, plus sister station smooth 80s. Prior to this, he presented the national evenings show on Heart owned by Global Radio, under the stage name 'Roberto'. Prior to Heart FM, he hosted mid mornings on the Capital FM Network.

== Early life ==
Born and raised in Enfield, North London, Williams is the younger of two children. He was educated at an all boys school, Friern Barnet Grammar School, in Friern Barnet, London. Later, he studied Hospitality Management at Thames Valley University in Ealing, followed by a radio training course at Town FM in North London. Since then, he has continued to present in radio. After losing over ten stone in weight he moved into television presenting and qualified as a personal trainer.

== Career ==
Williams started his radio career in August 1999 at Town FM in North London, a local community radio station. His first show was early breakfast between 4 and 6 am. After a few months, he was promoted to presenting breakfast. Both positions were unpaid, so whilst presenting both shows, he worked at T.G.I. Friday's in Enfield as a waiter and bartender.

Following a period at Town FM, Williams moved to Mercury 96.6 in Watford (now Heart Hertfordshire) as a cover presenter. This led to his first full-time show in commercial radio, presenting mid-mornings on Chiltern FM (now Heart Four Counties). From there he moved to Oxfordshire to present on Fox FM (now Heart Thames Valley), this was then followed by a move to Birmingham to present on BRMB (now Hits Radio Birmingham.)

=== Radio ===
In 2008, Neil hosted his first show on Capital FM in London, covering Sunday evening 7 till 10 pm. He only did one show by his own name. The next week it was decided by management that he should present his show under the stage name 'Roberto'. He has been known on-air as Roberto ever since.

During his time at Capital FM, Roberto hosted afternoons (1-4pm) followed by mid-mornings (10am–1pm). He also achieved the most listened to mid-morning show in London. Roberto was part of the team that took Capital FM national in 2011 and also interviewed music stars like Tinie Tempah, Justin Bieber, JLS, Jessie J and Enrique Iglesias.

In 2012, Roberto joined the Heart Network, also owned by Global Radio, hosting the national evening show and Non-Stop Club Classics every Friday and Saturday nights. He stepped down from evenings on Heart in January 2017 ahead of launching the weekday breakfast and Saturday late-morning show on sister station Heart 80s from March of that year. His two shows (mention above) were then taken over by Sian Welby in 16 January and Annaliese Dayes four days later respectively.

In 2023, Roberto hosted his final Breakfast show on Heart 80s, staying at Global as a relief presenter on Smooth Radio and Smooth 80s.

Since May 2025, Roberto hosts the breakfast show on Nation 80s from Nation Broadcasting, which had recently expanded coverage for the station.

Roberto has also been involved in television programmes for Channel 4, ITV and Sky.

=== Voice over ===
Williams is a male voice over artist with his own professional home studio. Previous clients include Sky 1, The Sun, BMW, McLaren, British Airways and ESPN.

=== DJ ===
Throughout his career, Roberto has DJ'd and hosted at events and nightclubs in London, Mallorca, Toronto, Miami and Los Angeles. Clients include London Fashion Week, Clyde & Co, CapCo, DSTRKT, ASOS and Tiger Tiger.

== Weight loss & Podcast ==
At his biggest, Williams weighed 23 and a half stone. He had been 'big' since a young age and carried the weight into adult life. A break up with a partner inspired him into losing weight, and since then he has lost over 10 stone. Most of that weight was lost within six months, in an unconventional way that involved doing no cardiovascular fitness or bariatric surgery.

With a passion for wanting to help others lose weight and achieve their goals, Williams started a podcast called 'The Secrets Of Weight Loss' in which he spoke to others who had successfully lost weight to find out how they did it. When first released, it hit the top spot of the Health and Fitness category on Apple Music.

== Charity work ==
Born with a hole in his Heart, Williams has been a supporter of the British Heart Foundation throughout his career, taking part in charity events including the London to Brighton Bike Ride, a skydive and numerous running events.

In 2009, Williams swam the Thames in the Great Swim for Help A Capital Child. In 2011 he ran the Virgin London Marathon and the Royal Parks Foundation Half Marathon, again for Help a Capital Child.
