= Chiltern Radio =

Chiltern Radio may refer to:

- Chiltern Voice FM, the Ofcom licensed radio station for the Chiltern's
- Heart Dunstable, formerly 97.6 Chiltern FM until 2009
- Chiltern Radio Network, the parent group of Chiltern FM until a hostile takeover by the GWR Group in 1995
