= Mercury Radio =

Mercury Radio may refer to:

- 102.7 Mercury FM, former radio station broadcasting to Surrey and Sussex, England
- Hertfordshire's Mercury 96.6, former radio station broadcasting to southern Hertfordshire, England
- Mercury Radio Arts, a production company founded by American commentator Glenn Beck
