= Romana D'Annunzio =

Scottish teacher and television presenter

- Born: 14 January 1972 (age 54); Edinburgh
- Occupation: Teacher
- Known for: Blue Peter

Romana D'Annunzio (born 14 January 1972) is a Scottish teacher and a former television presenter of Italian descent, who presented the children's programme Blue Peter from 1996 until 1998. Her co-presenters on the show were Tim Vincent, Stuart Miles, Katy Hill, Richard Bacon and Konnie Huq.

From 2004, D'Annunzio studied English and Italian at the University of Edinburgh and graduated with a MA, having also worked as an English teacher in Rome. D'Annunzio completed her post-graduate diploma in education at the University of Glasgow.
