= Paul Chantler =

British radio presenter

- Born: October 12, 1959
- Died: March 31, 2024 (aged 64); Eastbourne, East Sussex, England
- Presenting career
- Style: Radio presenter
- Country: United Kingdom

Paul Chantler (12 October 1959 – 31 March 2024) was a British radio broadcaster, author, and broadcasting executive who held senior programming roles at Chiltern Radio, Essex Radio, and Wireless Group and worked for the BBC.

== Career ==
In 1971, Chantler began his career working on Hospital Radio in Royal Tunbridge Wells. While serving as Program Director for Chiltern Radio, Chantler launched the Galaxy radio station, and he would later serve as the Group Programme Director for Essex Radio and the Wireless Group. When BBC Radio Wiltshire launched in April 1989 under the name BBC Wiltshire Sound, Chantler was its first presenter. The first song played on the station by Chantler was "We've Only Just Begun" by the Carpenters. Chantler later served as a consultant/presenter for other radio stations in the United Kingdom, such as Premier Christian Radio, Invicta Radio, and Southern Sound. Towards the end of his career he was a director of Fix Radio and Podcast Radio.

In 2022, radio broadcaster Paul Hollins and Chantler co-wrote Essential Media Law, a guide to libel and defamation. Following its popularity among content creators, the book was updated with a second edition in 2024. In 2019 Chantler was named a fellow of the Radio Academy for his “outstanding contribution to both public and commercial radio as a journalist, presenter and programmer”.

== Death ==
Chantler died on 31 March 2024, aged 64, in Eastbourne, East Sussex. Recently diagnosed with liver cancer, Chantler had been admitted to the hospital reporting breathing difficulties.

== Bibliography ==
- Chantler, Paul; Harris, Sim (1997). Local Radio Journalism. Focal Press. p. 178. ISBN 9780240514222.
- Chantler, Paul; Stewart, Peter (2009). Essential Radio Journalism: How to produce and present radio news. Bloomsbury Publishing. p. 288. ISBN 9781408141281.
- Chantler, Paul; Stewart, Peter (2013). Basic Radio Journalism. Taylor & Francis. p. 288. ISBN 9781136024344.
- Chantler, Paul; Hollins, Paul (2018). Keep It Legal. ISBN 9781718072985.
- Chantler, Paul; Stewart, Peter (2020). JournoLists.
- Hollins, Paul; Chantler, Paul (2022). Essential Media Law. Amazon Digital Services. ISBN 9798849975436.
