= Stuart Miles =

British radio and television presenter (born 1969)

- Born: 20 February 1969 (age 56)
- Occupation: Television and radio presenter
- Known for: Blue Peter presenter

Stuart Miles (born 20 February 1969) is a British radio and television presenter, who has worked on the children's programme Blue Peter.

== Career ==
Miles studied at Bournemouth University where he developed an interest in college radio, followed by a stint on hospital radio.

Stuart Miles gained his TV break working as a journalist for a local Cable TV station covering news and events in South London. From 1993 to 1994, Miles presented Saturday Disney, which led to him joining Blue Peter on 27 June 1994; some of his most memorable moments included joining the RAF Falcons display team and starring in various Blue Peter pantomimes. His last appearance was on 21 June 1999.

Miles controversially decided to leave Blue Peter after declaring that it was 'out of touch' with the then-current generation of children and needed to be modernized, and was frustrated at not being selected for its newly-vacant job of Programme Editor; he also felt that the sacking of co-presenter Richard Bacon had not been handled well. Stuart presented with Diane-Louise Jordan, Tim Vincent, Katy Hill, Romana D'Annunzio, Richard Bacon, Konnie Huq and Simon Thomas.

Since leaving Blue Peter, Miles has guest-presented such programmes as This Morning, Holiday, and Soap Fever, and took part in When Blue Peter Became ABBA. He has also directed various programmes, and regularly appears in pantomime.

In 2007, Stuart presented on Sky Vegas, an interactive gambling television channel, and started regularly performing his drag act, as a character called Stella Ratner.

I've never made any secret of my sexuality. Sexual frustration can be a powerful thing. I should know after five years on Blue Peter, where you're expected to be like Action Man – smooth all over with no genitals.

— Stuart Miles, News of the World, 11 November 2007

In January 2008, Stuart joined Gaydar Radio, replacing Sam Vangeen in its lunchtime Your Choice Requests show.

In 2008, Stuart took his live drag stand-up comedy show, "The Adventures of Pink Peter", to the Edinburgh Fringe festival.

On 26 April 2010, it was announced that Stuart would be the new Heart 96.6 (Northants) breakfast presenter, along with Natalie Besbrode (Natalie B), starting on 4 May, followed by the reformed Heart Home Counties which started on 16 July. Between February 2015 and July 2017 he co-presented "Heart Breakfast" with his former Blue Peter colleague Katy Hill.

He is also the regular stand in for Andy Collins on the breakfast show on BBC Three Counties Radio.

== Credits ==
Year	Title	Role	Production	Broadcast Dates
1993–1994	Saturday Disney	Presenter	GMTV	
1994–1999	Blue Peter	Presenter	BBC	
1995	Schofield's Quest	Presenter	LWT	3 December 1995
1996	To Me, To You!	Himself	BBC	19 July 1996
1998	Dennis the Menace: The Competition	Himself (voice)	BBC	13 February 1998
1999	This Morning	Presenter	Granada Television	17 February 1999
1999	Holidaymaker	Presenter	Meridian Broadcasting	August–September 1999
2000	The Phone Zone	Director	UK Play	
2000	This Morning	Presenter	Granada Television	19 April 2000
2001	Lily Savage's Blankety Blank	Himself	Grundy Productions	14 January 2001
2004	Simply the Best	Himself	Carlton Television	21 August 2004
2005	When Blue Peter became ABBA	Himself/Benny	RDF Media	20 September 2005
2008	Your Choice Requests	Presenter/DJ	Gaydar Radio	2 January 2008 – 25 April 2010
2010	Breakfast	Presenter	Heart Four Counties	4 May 2010 – 21 July 2017
2017	Drive Time	Presenter	Sam FM	19 June 2017 – Present
