= Chiltern Radio Network =

English local radio station owner

- Radio stations: 97.6 Chiltern FM; 96.9 Chiltern FM; Northants 96; Horizon Radio; Oasis Radio; Severn Sound; Galaxy Radio
- Headquarters: Dunstable
- Area: Bedfordshire, Northamptonshire, Hertfordshire, Buckinghamshire, Gloucester; Bristol

Chiltern Radio Network was the parent group of several Independent Local Radio stations in the 1980s and 1990s. These were divided across two networks: The Hot FM and SuperGold.

== History ==
Chiltern Radio launched on 15 October 1981 from studios located on Chiltern Road in Dunstable, Bedfordshire. On 1 June 1982, Chiltern expanded into Bedford with studios on Goldington Road. This was joined 30 November 1986 with Northants Radio from Northampton, and 15 October 1989 with Horizon Radio from Milton Keynes. The Hot FM network transmitted on the FM services of 97.6 Chiltern FM, 96.9 Chiltern FM, Northants 96, Horizon Radio, followed later by Oasis Radio, Severn Sound, and Galaxy Radio. For a while Galaxy Radio and Horizon Radio operated a slightly more edgy "Hotter Mix" format, although they switched back again to the "Hot FM" for networked programming. Supergold transmitted on the AM services of Chiltern Radio, Northants Radio, followed later by Severn Sound and Invicta Radio.

Stations would broadcast from their studios until 7pm, then share programmes from Dunstable overnight.

In May 1995, the GWR Group launched a hostile takeover bid for Chiltern. This completed in July, and GWR began re-branding the stations in September - the FM stations as part of their Mix Network and gold stations as Classic Gold Digital Network. Shared programming on FM moved to Bristol whilst shared AM programming remained in Dunstable. In May 2005, the GWR Group merged with Capital Radio to form GCap Media, which Global Radio bought out in 2008 and eventually became the Heart Radio network.

== Presenters ==
DJs and presenters have included Paul McKenna, Paul 'Mad Dog' O'Reilly, Martin Collins, Tony West, NJ Williams, Tony Lloyd, Paul Phear and Louie Martin. Networked presenters included Graham Torrington, Chris Moyles, Emma Scott, Steve Power, Chris Brooks, Tim Allen, Mark Sadler, Tom Stewart, Simon Clarke, Neale James, Treva Ellis and Laura Penn. Other presenters included Paul Garner who did a comedy and unsigned music show, David Francis on the late show and Dave Sanders who hosted a Sunday show consisting of mostly album tracks.

== Network news ==
Chiltern Radio Network ran the satellite news service Network News between 5 July 1991 and 1 April 1996 as a competitor to Independent Radio News. The service provided hourly national news bulletins to not only Chiltern stations, but other broadcasters including Virgin Radio, Radio Luxembourg, Choice FM, and Radio Maldwyn. Network News was joint led by Paul Chantler (then Group Programme Director of the Chiltern Radio Network) and Jon Davies, journalist who had been a key part of ITN Radio News. The service closed with the acquisition of Chiltern Radio by the GWR Group, which was a shareholder in IRN.
