= List of British films of 1986 =

A list of films produced in the United Kingdom in 1986 (see 1986 in film):

== 1986 ==
Title	Director	Cast	Genre	Notes
1986
Absolute Beginners	Julien Temple	Patsy Kensit, David Bowie, James Fox, Sade	Rock musical	
Aliens	James Cameron	Sigourney Weaver	Science fiction action	
Biggles: Adventures in Time	John Hough	Neil Dickson, Alex Hyde-White	Adventure	
Captive	Paul Mayersberg	Irina Brook, Oliver Reed	Thriller	
Caravaggio	Derek Jarman	Nigel Terry, Sean Bean, Tilda Swinton	Drama	Won the Silver Bear at Berlin
Castaway	Nicolas Roeg	Oliver Reed, Amanda Donohoe	Drama	
Clockwise	Christopher Morahan	John Cleese, Penelope Wilton	Comedy	
Coming Up Roses	Stephen Bayly	Ifan Huw Dafydd, Gillian Elisa, Mari Emlyn	Comedy/drama	
Comrades	Bill Douglas	Keith Allen, Dave Atkins	Drama/historical	Entered into the 37th Berlin International Film Festival
Eat the Peach	Peter Ormrod	Stephen Brennan, Eamon Morissey	Comedy	Co-production with ROI
Fatherland	Ken Loach	Gerulf Pannach, Fabienne Babe, Cristine Rose	Drama	
Foreign Body	Ronald Neame	Warren Mitchell, Victor Banerjee, Amanda Donohoe	Comedy	
Gothic	Ken Russell	Gabriel Byrne, Julian Sands	Historical horror	
Half Moon Street	Bob Swaim	Sigourney Weaver, Michael Caine	Thriller	
Highlander	Russell Mulcahy	Christopher Lambert, Sean Connery	Fantasy	
Knights & Emeralds	Ian Emes	Christopher Wild, Beverly Hills, Warren Mitchell	Drama	
Labyrinth	Jim Henson	David Bowie, Jennifer Connelly	Fantasy	
Lady Jane	Trevor Nunn	Helena Bonham Carter, Cary Elwes	Historical drama	
Letters to an Unknown Lover	Peter Duffell	Yves Beneyton, Cherie Lunghi	Romance	
Link	Richard Franklin	Elisabeth Shue, Terence Stamp	Horror	
The Mission	Roland Joffé	Robert De Niro, Jeremy Irons	Drama	Multiple awards, including the Palme d'Or at the 1986 Cannes Film Festival
Mona Lisa	Neil Jordan	Bob Hoskins, Cathy Tyson, Michael Caine	Crime drama	Hoskins won the Best Actor award at the 1986 Cannes Film Festival.
Rawhead Rex	George Pavlou	Niall Tóibín, David Dukes	Horror	
Rita, Sue and Bob Too	Alan Clarke	Michelle Holmes, Siobhan Finneran	Drama	
Shanghai Surprise	Jim Goddard	Madonna, Sean Penn	Crime/drama	
Sid and Nancy	Alex Cox	Gary Oldman, Chloe Webb	Biopic	
Sky Bandits	Zoran Perisic	Scott McGinnis, Miles Anderson	Action/adventure	
Time After Time	Bill Hays	John Gielgud, Googie Withers	Comedy	
Wham! in China: Foreign Skies	Lindsay Anderson	George Michael, Andrew Ridgeley	Documentary	
When the Wind Blows	Jimmy Murakami	John Mills, Peggy Ashcroft	Drama/animated	
The Whistle Blower	Simon Langton	Michael Caine, Felicity Dean, John Gielgud	Spy, Thriller	
Witchboard	Kevin Tenney	Tawny Kitaen, Stephen Nichols, Todd Allen	Horror	

== See also ==
- 1986 in British music
- 1986 in British radio
- 1986 in British television
- 1986 in the United Kingdom
