= Katy Hill =

British television presenter

- Born: 15 April 1971 (age 55); Poole, Dorset, England
- Occupation: Television presenter
- Known for: Blue Peter; Live & Kicking
- Spouses: Andrew Frampton (m. 1999–2001) Trey Farley (m. 2004)
- Children: 2

Katy Hill (born 15 April 1971) is an English television presenter who has worked in television and radio in the UK since 1995. She presented the long-running children's programme Blue Peter from 1995 to 2000 and the flagship Saturday morning series Live & Kicking from 2000 to 2001.

== Early life and education ==
She was born in Poole, Dorset where her father, Chris, was then a curate (trainee vicar) at a local church. Katy has two siblings: an elder brother, Simon; and a younger sister, Naomi. Hill gained nine 'O' levels and four 'A' Levels at St. Edward's Church of England School in Romford, London, and worked in a record shop before she started presenting. Hill worked for free at the local radio station BBC Essex, to gain the experience required to become a presenter.

== Career ==
Hill began her media career with voluntary work in Essex at EastWard Hospital Television, and presented Katy's Capers on BBC Essex, before transferring to Nickelodeon. Whilst working for BBC channel controllers and the Head of Children's Television as a secretary, she bombarded the editor of Blue Peter with showreels, which resulted in her winning an audition place.

On 23 June 1995, Hill joined the Children's BBC television programme Blue Peter, ultimately leaving on 19 June 2000. Her assignments included living with a family in Mongolia for a week, training with the England football squad for a FIFA World Cup special, joining the Cirque du Soleil, and making objects from yoghurt pots and sticky-backed plastic. For her stint on Blue Peter, Hill won the 2000 Children's BAFTA Award for Best Presenter. She returned for one edition on 30 March 2010, for the final programme to feature the dog Mabel.

As a result of her work on Blue Peter, Hill also presented Live & Kicking, Top of the Pops, Football Fever (she supports Newcastle United) and 2000 to 1 with Michael Parkinson, which was, for the final only, part of 2000 Today. She also presented the BBC's Holiday and went on to present the weekend breakfast show on 95.8 Capital FM. Hill has written for numerous magazines, including a regular column for Cosmopolitan Hair & Beauty, Hello! and Closer. In both 2000 and 2001, she presented the final of BBC One's A Song for Europe, the competition to select the United Kingdom's entry for the annual Eurovision Song Contest.

In 2004, Hill appeared on the Channel 4 reality series, The Games, in which she came second overall in the female contenders, winning five out of the seven required disciplines. After Neil Fox quit as the long-running host of the networked Hit40UK (also in 2004), Hill – previously one of his stand-ins – was recruited, initially to co-host with Stephanie Hirst each Sunday, from the studios of Capital Radio in London. Hill chose to leave after a year, due to other commitments, and Hirst eventually went on to host the programme alone.

Hill co-presented the concert held in Trafalgar Square where the host of the 2012 Summer Olympics was announced, for which London was a candidate. When London was announced as the victor, Hill was seen cheering and shouting with joy with Olympian Kelly Holmes. Hill is also the brand ambassador of Arm & Hammer and has done three campaigns for the company.

In May 2010, Hill joined the women's lifestyle website iVillage.co.uk as a weekly blogger. She now hosts her own lifestyle and parenting blog at katyhill.com.

In late December 2010, Hill acted as relief co-presenter on ITV's breakfast channel Daybreak. Years later, between February 2015 and July 2017, she co-presented Heart Breakfast for Heart Radio in the Four Counties region with former Blue Peter colleague Stuart Miles.

Since 2019 Hill became a certified success and confidence coach, shortly after Hill suffered a terrible fall, leaving a scar on the top of her forehead.

== Personal life ==
Hill married childhood sweetheart and record producer Andrew Frampton in 1999. The marriage lasted two years before they divorced. Hill then began dating fellow Live & Kicking presenter Trey Farley. They became engaged after he proposed to her, while on holiday in Venice, and the couple married in Tuscany on 4 July 2004. They now live in Los Angeles, and have a daughter, born in 2006, and a son, born in 2007.
