= Heart (radio network) =

British radio network

- Country: United Kingdom
- Broadcast area: United Kingdom; International (via Online)
- Headquarters: Leicester Square, London

Programming
- Language: English
- Format: Hot adult contemporary

Ownership
- Owner: Global

History
- Launch date: 6 September 1994

Coverage
- Stations: See list

Links
- Website: www.heart.co.uk

Heart is a network of 13 independent adult contemporary radio stations in the United Kingdom, broadcasting a mix of local and networked programming, although only the stations in Scotland and Wales still have their own shows. Ten of the stations are owned and operated by Global, while the other three are owned and operated under separate franchise agreements. The national version of the network is widely available on Global Player, Freeview, Sky, Freesat, Virgin Media and Digital One DAB.

According to RAJAR as of Q4 2025, the entire Heart network has been named "UK biggest radio brand," receiving 12.71 million weekly listeners, beating edgily behind their rival station BBC Radio 2 (with 12.7 million). Heart Breakfast, hosted by Jamie Theakston and Amanda Holden, has 4.1 million listeners, on par with BBC Radio 1 morning show, hosted by Greg James.

== History ==
=== Launch ===
Heart began broadcasting in the West Midlands on 6 September 1994 as 100.7 Heart FM, becoming the UK's third Independent Regional Radio station, five days after Century Radio in North East England, and Jazz FM North West.

The first song to be played on 100.7 Heart FM was Something Got Me Started by Simply Red. Its original format of "soft adult contemporary" music included artists such as Lionel Richie and Tina Turner. Reflecting this, its early slogan was 100.7 Degrees Cooler!

Heart 106.2 began test transmissions in London in August 1995, prior to the station launch on 5 September. This included live broadcasts of WPLJ from New York City.

In 1996 the station's original "soft AC" music format was replaced with a generally more neutral Hot AC playlist. Century 106 in the East Midlands became the third station of the Heart network in 2005 after GCap Media sold Century. Chrysalis' radio holdings were sold to Global Radio in 2007.

When GCap Media was taken over by Global Radio in 2008, it announced plans to dissolve the 41-station One Network, with one station (Power FM) becoming part of the Galaxy network, four stations (BRMB, Beacon Radio, Mercia FM and Wyvern FM) forming a West Midlands regional network, seven stations joining Capital FM to form The Hit Music Network and the remaining 29 stations forming the Heart Network.

Heart East Midlands was sold to Orion Media, along with the West Midlands network of local stations, due to the same competition concerns that had forced its earlier sale to Chrysalis.

=== Network restructuring ===
Between June and September 2010, Global Radio merged the majority of the 33 Heart stations to create a smaller network of 18 local and regional stations, in line with new OFCOM guidelines on local output requirements. Two Hit Music Network stations were also closed and merged with Heart stations.

Merged station	Closed stations	City of licence
Heart Cambridgeshire	Heart Peterborough; Heart Cambridge	Peterborough later Cambridge
Heart South West (later Heart West)	Heart Exeter and Heart Torbay; Heart Plymouth; Heart South Devon; Heart North Devon	Exeter
Heart East Anglia	Heart Norwich; Heart Ipswich	Norwich
Heart Essex	Heart Chelmsford & Southend; Heart Colchester; Ten 17 (rebranded)	Chelmsford
Heart Hertfordshire	Rebranded from Hertfordshire's Mercury 96.6	Watford
Heart Four Counties	Heart Northants; Heart Milton Keynes; Heart Dunstable; Heart Bedford	Dunstable, later Milton Keynes
Heart North West and Wales	Heart North Wales Coast; Heart Cheshire and North East Wales; Heart Wirral	Wrexham
Heart South Coast	Heart Dorset & New Forest; Heart Hampshire	Fareham
Heart Sussex and Surrey	Heart Sussex; Mercury FM (rebranded)	Brighton
Heart Thames Valley	Heart Berkshire; Heart Oxfordshire	Reading
Heart West Country	Heart Bristol; Heart Somerset; Heart Bath	Bristol

Stations in Gloucestershire, Kent, London, the West Midlands, the East Midlands and Wiltshire were unaffected by the changes. Heart Cymru, serving Gwynedd and Anglesey, moved its studios from Bangor to Wrexham but retained its extended local output of 10 hours on weekdays and 8 hours on Saturdays and Sundays. Heart North West and Wales retained an opt-out on 96.3FM (the North Wales Coast) for Welsh language programming.

On 1 January 2011, Orion Media, the owners of Heart East Midlands (one of the original three Heart stations) renamed and relaunched the station as 'Gem 106', ending a franchise agreement with Global Radio formed when Global purchased GCap – the agreement allowed Orion to use the Heart identity and carry networked programming from London. The move saw Heart's networked programming replaced by local output from Nottingham.

=== Network expansion ===
On 19 March 2012, Global Radio announced it had bought the Cornwall ILR station Atlantic FM from joint owners Tindle Radio and Camel Media. Atlantic FM became part of the Heart Network and merged with Heart Devon on Monday 7 May 2012 to form Heart South West, which is based in Exeter.

On 6 February 2014, Global Radio announced it would be rebranding all Real Radio stations as Heart and would be selling Real Radio Yorkshire and the Northern licence for Real Radio Wales to Communicorp. The Communicorp-owned stations use Heart's network programming and branding under a franchise agreement with Global.

Global Radio extended the Heart network to the Real Radio network of regional stations from Tuesday 6 May 2014. The two stations based in Wrexham – Heart North West and Wales and Heart Cymru – became part of the Capital FM Network on the same date.

On 20 November 2017, CN Group announced The Bay would be sold to Global along with sister station Lakeland Radio – the sale was finalised by 1 December 2017. The Bay was rebranded as Heart, with Lakeland Radio becoming Smooth on 4 March 2018.

Music from the 1960s, 1970s & 1980s was removed from the original FM station after Christmas 2017.

=== Consolidation ===
In February 2019, following OFCOM's decision to relax local content obligations from commercial radio, it was announced Heart would replace its local breakfast and weekend shows with additional networked programming from London by the end of the year. This reduced total weekly hours of local programming on each station from 43 to 15 and led to dozens of job losses.

Drivetime output were reduced from 23 localised shows to 10 programmes covering enlarged areas, formed from the merger of Heart stations. Ten studios producing local programming were closed. Localised news, traffic updates and advertising was retained across all licence areas.

In April 2019, it was reported the local Heart Breakfast shows would be replaced by a national Heart Breakfast show from London on 3 June 2019, presented by Jamie Theakston and Amanda Holden. The merging stations ceased local output on 31 May 2019.

In Hertfordshire, a further change saw Heart Hertfordshire, based in Watford, merged with BOB fm – following its acquisition by Communicorp – to form a single countywide service.

Stations in the North East of England, Wales, central and southern Scotland, the West Midlands and Yorkshire continue to serve their single licence areas as before.

Merged station	Closed stations	City of licence
Heart East	Heart Cambridgeshire; Heart East Anglia; Heart Essex; Heart Four Counties (studios retained)	Milton Keynes
Heart Hertfordshire	BOB fm Heart Hertfordshire (studios retained)	Watford
Heart North West	Heart North Lancashire & Cumbria; Heart North West (studios retained)	Manchester
Heart South	Heart Kent; Heart Solent (studios retained); Heart Sussex and Surrey; Heart Thames Valley	Fareham
Heart West	Heart Gloucestershire; Heart South West; Heart West Country (studios retained); Heart Wiltshire	Bristol

=== Heart Scotland re-introduces local programming ===
In April 2023, it was announced Heart Scotland would reintroduce local breakfast, daytime and weekend programming from 2 May 2023, as part of a major expansion of Global's Scottish radio operations.

=== The end of local and regional programming in England ===
Heart stations in England ended local and regional programming on 21 February 2025, but retaining local news bulletins and advertising. Scotland and Wales will retain their respective local programming.

== List of stations ==
=== Nations ===
As of 24 February 2025, Heart's nations studios are:

Heart station	Studios
Heart East; Heart Hertfordshire; Heart London (HQ retained); Heart North East; Heart North West; Heart South; Heart West; Heart West Midlands; Heart Yorkshire	London
Heart North Wales; Heart South Wales (studios retained)	Cardiff
Heart Scotland	Glasgow

=== Spin-offs ===
As of 12 September 2024, Heart's spin-offs consist of ten stations, broadcast from Global's London headquarters:

Years	Heart station	Notes
2019–present	Heart 70s	
2017–present	Heart 80s	
2019–present	Heart 90s	
2022–present	Heart 00s	Replaced Capital Xtra Reloaded on national DAB+.
2024–present	Heart 10s	
2019–present	Heart Dance	Weekend evening "Club Classics" programmes simulcast with Heart
2024–present	Heart Love	
2024–present	Heart Musicals	
2016–	Heart UK	Originally Heart extra with automated daytime between 10am to 4pm Weekdays, relaunched 2020. It is the main feed for Heart network programming, with national advertising for regions, especially Northern Ireland and the Channel Islands, that don't have a Heart station on FM.
2020–	Heart Xmas	Usually available from September to January, however this varies each year.

== Programming and presenters ==
Heart's network programming is produced and broadcast from the headquarters of Global at Leicester Square in central London. Most of the network's output is broadcast live, although some weekend shows are voicetracked.

As of 21 June 2019, Heart's Club Classics is simulcast with sister station Heart Dance. The EE Official Big Top 40 From Global on Sunday afternoons is simulcast with Heart's sister network, Capital.

=== Networked presenters ===
Lineup for national feed (excluding the public/bank holidays):

- Guy Howard, weekdays 1–4am
- Lindsey Russell, weekdays 4–6:30am
- Jamie Theakston and Amanda Holden, weekdays 6:30–10am (Heart's Breakfast)
- Pandora Christie, weekdays 10am–1pm & Saturday 7–11pm (Heart's Club Classics)
- Matt Wilkinson, weekdays 1–4pm
- JK and Kelly Brook, weekdays 4–7pm
- Dev Griffin, weekdays (excludes Fridays) 7–10pm & Saturday 12–4pm
- Ben Atkinson, weekdays 10pm–1am
- Toby Anstis (Heart's Club Classics), Friday 7–11pm
- Seb Bailey, weekends 1–6am
- Ant Payne, weekends 6–9am
- Mark Wright & Olly Murs, Saturday 9am–12pm
- Vicky Pattison, Saturday 4–7pm
- Rezzy Ghadjar, Friday & Saturday 11pm–1am
- Zoe Hardman, Sunday 9am–12pm
- Yasmin Evans, Sunday 12–4pm
- Will Manning (for The Official Big Top 40), Sunday 4–7pm
- Emma Bunton, Sunday 7–10pm
- Anna Whitehouse, Sunday 10pm–1am

Heart Decade Stations (70s, 80s, 90s, 00s, 10s & Dance):

- Carlos, Heart 70s
- Simon Beale, Heart 80s
- Kevin Hughes, Heart 90s
- Fia Tarrant, Heart 00s breakfast
- Ashley Roberts, Heart 00s weekend afternoons
- Adam O' Neill, Heart 10s
- Toby Anstis, Heart Dance

Heart Cover Presenters:

- Davina McCall (Heart Breakfast cover for Amanda Holden)
- Vogue Williams (Heart Breakfast cover for Amanda Holden)
- Zoe Hardman (Heart Breakfast cover for Amanda Holden)
- Katrina Ridley (late night, overnights, early breakfast & weekend cover)
- Johnny Meah (decade station, late night, overnights & weekend morning cover)
- Pat Sharp, Heart 80s cover
- Aston Merrygold, Heart 00s cover
- Adam Lawrence, Heart 10s cover

=== Former presenters ===
- Siân Welby (now at Capital)
- Jenni Falconer (now at Smooth London)
- Ellie Taylor
- Rochelle Humes
- Jason Donovan
- Stephen Mulhern and Emma Willis
- Neil 'Roberto' Williams (now occasional cover Smooth Radio and regular on the Nation Radio network)
- Margherita Taylor (Now at Classic FM & Smooth Radio)
- Harriet Scott (now at Magic)
- Lilah Parsons
- Annaliese Dayes
- Rob Howard (had his final show on Sunday, 29th March 2026 before leaving the main station and being replaced by Ant Payne)

=== News ===
All Heart stations broadcast local news bulletins each day – updates air hourly from 5am to 7pm on weekdays and from 6am to 12pm at weekends, similar to how Capital broadcasts news updates.

In accordance with OFCOM speech requirements, some Heart stations produce separate localised bulletins. For example, Heart West produces bulletins for Bristol and Somerset, Wiltshire, Gloucestershire, Devon and Cornwall.

=== Network presentation ===
As of 2014, the network uses jingles and themes produced by ReelWorld Europe, based in Salford.

Previously, Heart used a jingle package, composed by the Seattle-based music production company IQ Beats.

== Criticisms ==
In August 2010, listeners in Bedfordshire and Crawley, West Sussex, complained about the merger of Heart stations and called for a boycott of the station.

Some listeners have complained about what they regard as the repetitive nature of Heart's playlist. A public complaint to the regulator Ofcom in 2012 that the "More Music Variety" slogan was materially misleading was not pursued as Ofcom deemed that it did not warrant further investigation. Ofcom stated that "We did not consider listeners were materially misled by this slogan."

Further complaints were made to the station in 2019, largely regarding the merger of some Heart stations and the reduction in local programming, following the relaxation of local content guidelines by OFCOM.

== Networked slogans ==
- 1994-1996: "100.7 degrees cooler" (West Midlands)
- 1995–1996: "106.2 degrees cooler" (London)
- 1996–2017: "More Music Variety"
- 2006–2009: "Feel Good Music"
- 2017–present: "Turn Up the Feel Good!"
- 2017–2019 Heart Breakfast slogan: "[city/region]'s favourite Breakfast Show"
