= Heart Four Counties =

Coordinates: 51.8903°N 0.5298°W

- Dunstable; England
- Broadcast area: Bedfordshire, Buckinghamshire, Hertfordshire and Northamptonshire
- Frequencies: FM: Northamptonshire: 96.6 (Northampton and Daventry), North Bedfordshire, West Cambridgeshire and North Hertfordshire: 96.9 (Kempston), NW & Central Hertfordshire, South Bedfordshire and East Buckinghamshire: 97.6 (Leighton Buzzard and Luton), North Buckinghamshire: 103.3 (Milton Keynes and Bletchley), DAB: 10D (Herts, Beds Bucks); RDS: Heart
- Branding: This is Heart

Programming
- Format: Adult Contemporary

Ownership
- Owner: Global Group

History
- First air date: 16 July 2010

Heart Four Counties was a local radio station owned and operated by Global Radio as part of the Heart network. It broadcast to Bedfordshire, Buckinghamshire, Hertfordshire and Northamptonshire.

The station launched on Friday 16 July 2010 as a result of a merger between Heart Milton Keynes (formerly Horizon Radio), Heart Northants (formerly Northants 96), Heart Dunstable (formerly 97.6 Chiltern Radio) and Heart Bedford (formerly 96.9 Chiltern Radio).

== History ==
The regional station originally broadcast as four separate stations - Chiltern Radio began broadcasting to Hertfordshire, Bedfordshire and Buckinghamshire in October 1981 and launched a separate Bedford station in June 1982. Northants 96 began broadcasting to Northamptonshire in November 1986 and Horizon Radio launched in north Buckinghamshire in October 1989.

These stations were owned and operated by the Chiltern Radio Group, which was sold off to the GWR Group in 1995. Subsequently, the GWR Group merged with Capital Radio in 2005 to form GCap Media, which was subsequently bought out by Global Radio in 2008.

On 21 June 2010, Global Radio announced it would merge the four stations as part of plans to reduce the Heart network of stations from 33 separate stations to 16 co-located 'broadcast centres'. The new station began broadcasting from Dunstable on Friday 16 July 2010 and moved to new studios in Milton Keynes on 6 September 2011.

=== Station merger ===
On 26 February 2019, Global announced that Heart Four Counties would be merged with three sister stations in Cambridgeshire, Essex and East Anglia.

Since 3 June 2019, local output has consisted of a three-hour regional Drivetime show on weekdays, alongside localised news bulletins, traffic updates and advertising. Local breakfast and weekend shows were replaced with network programming from London.

Heart East began broadcasting regional programming from the Milton Keynes studios on 3 June 2019.

== Former presenters ==
- Stuart Miles
- Katy Hill
