= Heart Hertfordshire =

Coordinates: 51.6407°N 0.4330°W

- Watford; United Kingdom
- Broadcast area: Hertfordshire
- Frequencies: FM: 96.6 (Watford, St Albans and Hemel Hempstead) MHz, 106.7 (Stevenage) MHz, 106.9 (Welwyn Garden City, Letchworth Garden City, Hatfield, Hertford, Ware, Hitchin and Baldock) MHz; RDS: Heart_ht
- Branding: This is Heart

Programming
- Format: Hot Adult Contemporary
- Network: Heart

Ownership
- Owner: Communicorp UK
- Operator: Global

History
- First air date: 22 October 1994 (30 years ago)

Links
- Website: Heart Watford & Hemel; Heart North Hertfordshire

Logo of Mercury 96.6 during GCap Media ownership

Heart Hertfordshire (previously known as Hertfordshire's Mercury 96.6) is an Independent Local Radio station owned by Communicorp UK and operated by Global as part of the Heart network. It broadcasts across Hertfordshire.

In 2005, it was sold by GCap Media to the Adventure Radio Company although it still carried programming from GCap's successors Global as well as having its website maintained by Global. The station was rebranded on Monday 26 July 2010, but as it is not owned outright by Global, it operates as a franchise.

In 2019, the station merged with BOB fm in north Hertfordshire and began broadcasting to the entire county.

== History ==
The Radio Authority in 1993 advertised thirteen new local radio licences across the UK, one being awarded to the St Albans and Watford Broadcasting Company, a wholly owned subsidiary of the former Chiltern Radio Network. Based in Hatfield Road, St Albans and promising "classic and contemporary hits, sport, local and national news", Oasis Radio went on-air on 22 October 1994 as a complementary sister station to Chiltern Radio (Herts, Beds and Bucks)- both stations being receivable in its target area. Oasis played softer adult contemporary music than "The Hot FM" format from Chiltern.

In 1996, the GWR Group acquired the Chiltern Radio Network along with Oasis Radio, which was relaunched as The New 96.6FM – "Classic Hits of the 70s, 80s and 90s". The station took on the same sound as the rest of its 'Mix Network' group of stations, albeit with more 1970s tracks.

In 1997, the station was sold to Essex Radio plc and relaunched as 96.6 Oasis FM. Advertisements were taken out in local newspapers such as the Watford Chronicle and on the backs of buses in the area to inform listeners that they were "back after the break" – a cheeky comment on the previous management's incarnation, which did not have a proper name (The New 96.6FM) and which never really captured the listener's imagination. Capital Radio started selling advertising space on behalf of the newly relaunched station, which moved to the Christopher Place Shopping Centre in St Albans.

In 1999, the station changed again. The Daily Mail and General Trust bought Essex Radio plc under its sub-division DMG Radio Ltd. This meant another name change to Mercury FM 96.6 – a name shared by other stations in the company's portfolio, which were:

- Mercury FM 102.7 – Reigate and Crawley
- Mercury FM 96.2 & 101.6 – West Kent and North Surrey
- Mercury FM 101.7 – Harlow
- Mercury FM 107.9 – Medway Towns, Kent

and paired off with the flagship station Essex FM. Each station used the slogan of "Hotter and Fresher", signifying a shift towards a more contemporary slant in the station's music policy. The semi-network was disbanded after the GWR Group bought DMG Radio in 2002, in effect re-purchasing Mercury 96.6. The Mercury stations in Medway and West Kent were sold to the Kent Messenger Group.

In 2003, Mercury 96.6 moved from St Albans to an industrial estate on the outskirts of Watford in an attempt to re-focus the station as a Watford-only station. This was due to the then Radio Authority regulations on local ownership of stations as the GWR Group already owned Chiltern FM, which has overlapping coverage in the St Albans and Hemel Hempstead areas. This move was in a bid to hold on to the station before the outgoing Radio Authority was replaced by Ofcom and in a bid to compete with then rival Capital Radio in London. Mercury FM by then took on the "Better Music Mix" format that originated from GWR in Bristol.

In 2005, the St Albans and Watford Broadcasting Company was divested to a new company, Adventure Radio Holdings, an entertainment consortium that owns a theme park in Southend-on-Sea, Essex, and four other radio stations, including two in Essex. Despite its relatively independent status, the station was rebranded from Mercury 96.6 to Heart on Monday 26 July 2010 and switched to a softer adult contemporary music format. The changes coincided with a restructuring of Heart. Up until July 2010, the station formed part of Global's The Hit Music Network, broadcasting a mix of locally produced output from Watford and networked programming from Nottingham.

In July 2016, the station owners Adventure Island signed a management contract with Communicorp that would see them offer extra support to both Heart Hertfordshire and Connect FM.

In February 2019, Adventure Radio sold the station to Communicorp. Two months later, Communicorp acquired Shadow Radio Holdings, the owners of BOB fm in north Hertfordshire.

On 31 May 2019, BOB fm ceased broadcasting and became a relay of Heart Hertfordshire. The merger coincided with the end of Heart's local breakfast and weekend programming.

As of 24 February 2025 all programming originates from Global's London headquarters, including Heart Drive, presented each weekday by JK and Kelly Brook.

== News ==
Journalists within the East of England produce hourly local news bulletins from 6am to 7pm on weekdays and 6am to 12pm on weekends.
