= Mercury FM =

- England
- Broadcast area: East Surrey and North Sussex
- Frequencies: 97.5 MHz, 102.7 MHz

Programming
- Format: CHR/Pop

Ownership
- Owner: Global Radio

History
- First air date: 20 October 1984
- Last air date: 25 July 2010

Links
- Website: www.mercuryfm.co.uk

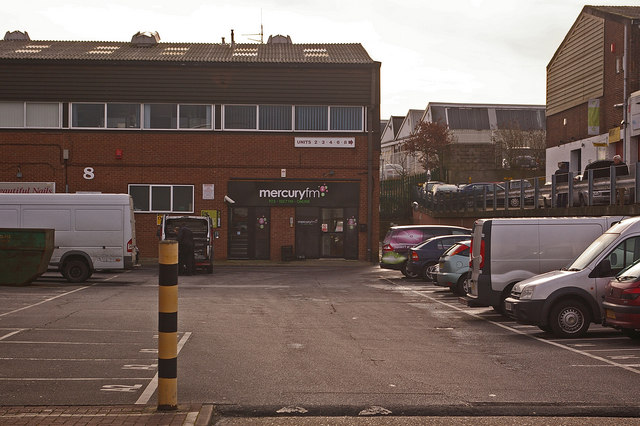
Mercury's studios at the Manor Royal industrial estate, Crawley, 2009

Mercury FM was an Independent Local Radio station in the Surrey and Sussex area of the United Kingdom that was founded on 20 October 1984 and closed on 25 July 2010. The station broadcast on FM 97.5 MHz in Horsham and 102.7 MHz in East Surrey and North Sussex and later merged with Heart Sussex to form Heart Sussex and Surrey.

== History ==
Radio Mercury was founded by John Aumonier and began airing on 20 October 1984, on 103.6 FM and 1521 AM focusing on Crawley but serving much of East Surrey and North Sussex. Two years later, the FM frequency changed to 102.7 as part of the UK-wide re-organisation of the VHF/FM band. 1985 saw a relay of the station added for the town of Horsham on 97.5. In 1991 the station took over most of County Sound Radio in Guildford to form the Allied Radio plc.

Mercury then, having played a broad mix of music, became a mainly Top 40 hits station. County Sound's AM frequency was later renamed "Extra AM" and then again was shortly renamed "Mercury Extra AM" to make the connection between the two AM frequencies of both stations better known. It also became known as The Breeze, until the Classic Gold Network took over the AM licence of 1521 kHz. On 102.7 FM Mercury was renamed "Mercury FM" after the takeover of the group by GWR, later GCap Media. Before that Mercury lost the County Sound region again, and Eagle Radio took the Surrey 96.4 FM transmitter, and County Sound returned to 1476 AM.

The station was incorporated into GCap's "One Network" of stations, until the merger between GCap and Chrysalis Radio, forming Global Radio. As part of this merger, many of the former One Network stations were rebranded and reformatted under the "Heart" network which still stands today.

As the merger took place and the One Network was being disbanded, Mercury FM was incorporated into the now-defunct Hit Music Network along with a number of other stations, which retained their heritage brands due to a neighbouring Heart station overlapping into their broadcast area. The station was part of the network until its rebrand on 25 July 2010 as Heart.

== Closure ==
In July 2010, Mercury FM became part of the Heart Network. The final Mercury FM programme was broadcast on Sunday 25 July 2010, with the newly merged Heart Sussex and Surrey launching the next day.

As of 2024, Radio Mercury remains a listed business with companies house at the address for Global studios in London.
