= Heart Sussex and Surrey =

Coordinates: 50°50′00″N 0°12′30″W

Brighton; England
- Broadcast area: Sussex and Surrey
- Frequencies: FM: 96.9 (Peacehaven), 97.5 (Horsham), 102 (Hastings), 102.4 (Eastbourne and Polegate), 102.7 (Reigate and Redhill); 103.5 (Brighton and Hove); DAB: 10B (Sussex Coast), 10C (Surrey and South London)
- Branding: This is Heart

Ownership
- Owner: Global

History
- First air date: 26 July 2010
- Last air date: 3 June 2019

Links
- Website: Heart Sussex; Heart Crawley & Surrey

Heart Sussex and Surrey was a local radio station owned and operated by Global Radio as part of the Heart network. It broadcast to Sussex and Surrey from studios in the Portslade area of Brighton.

The station launched on Monday 26 July 2010 as a result of a merger between Heart Sussex (formerly Southern FM) and Mercury FM.

== History ==
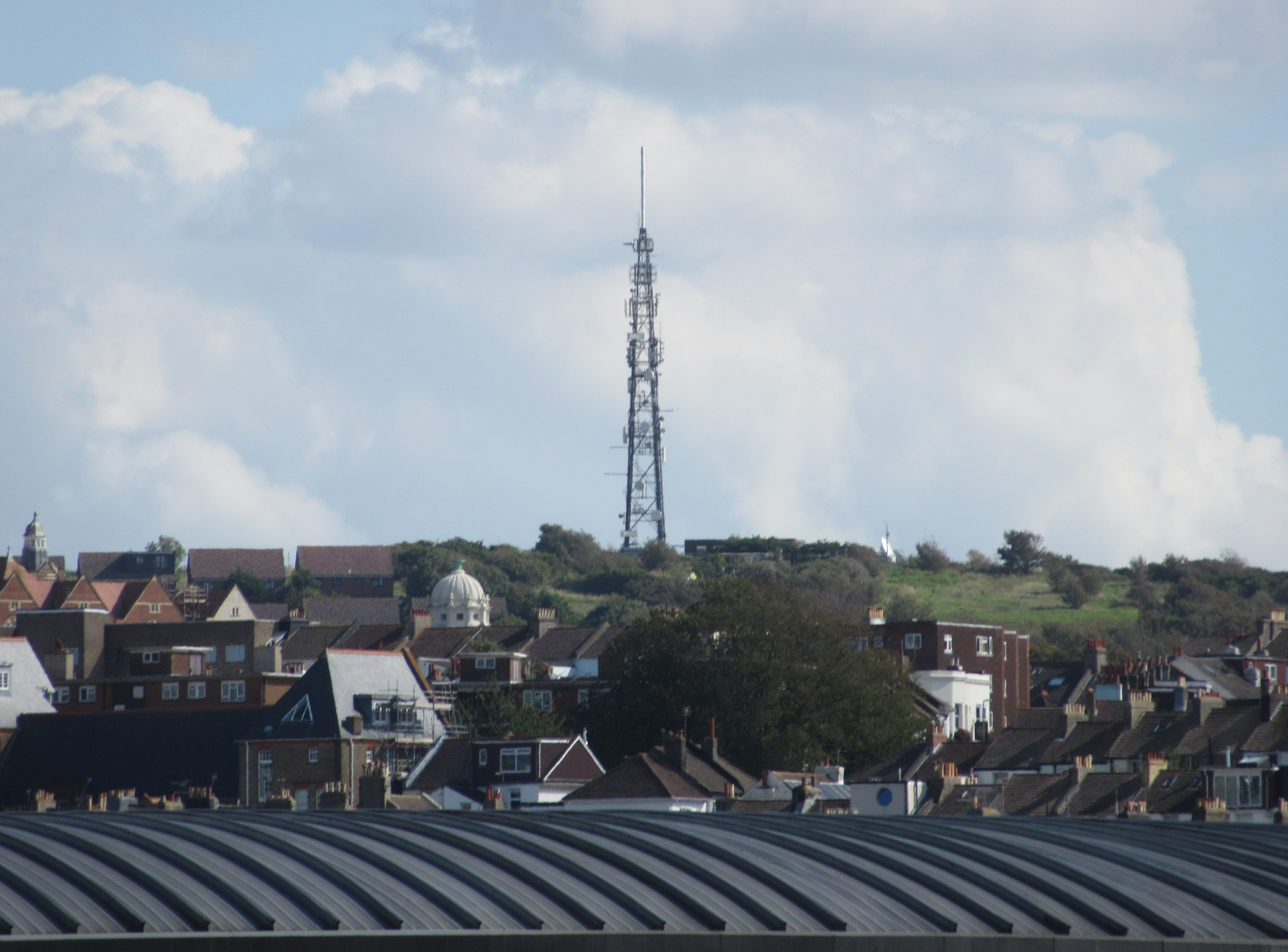
Whitehawk Hill transmitting station, which served Heart Sussex and Surrey

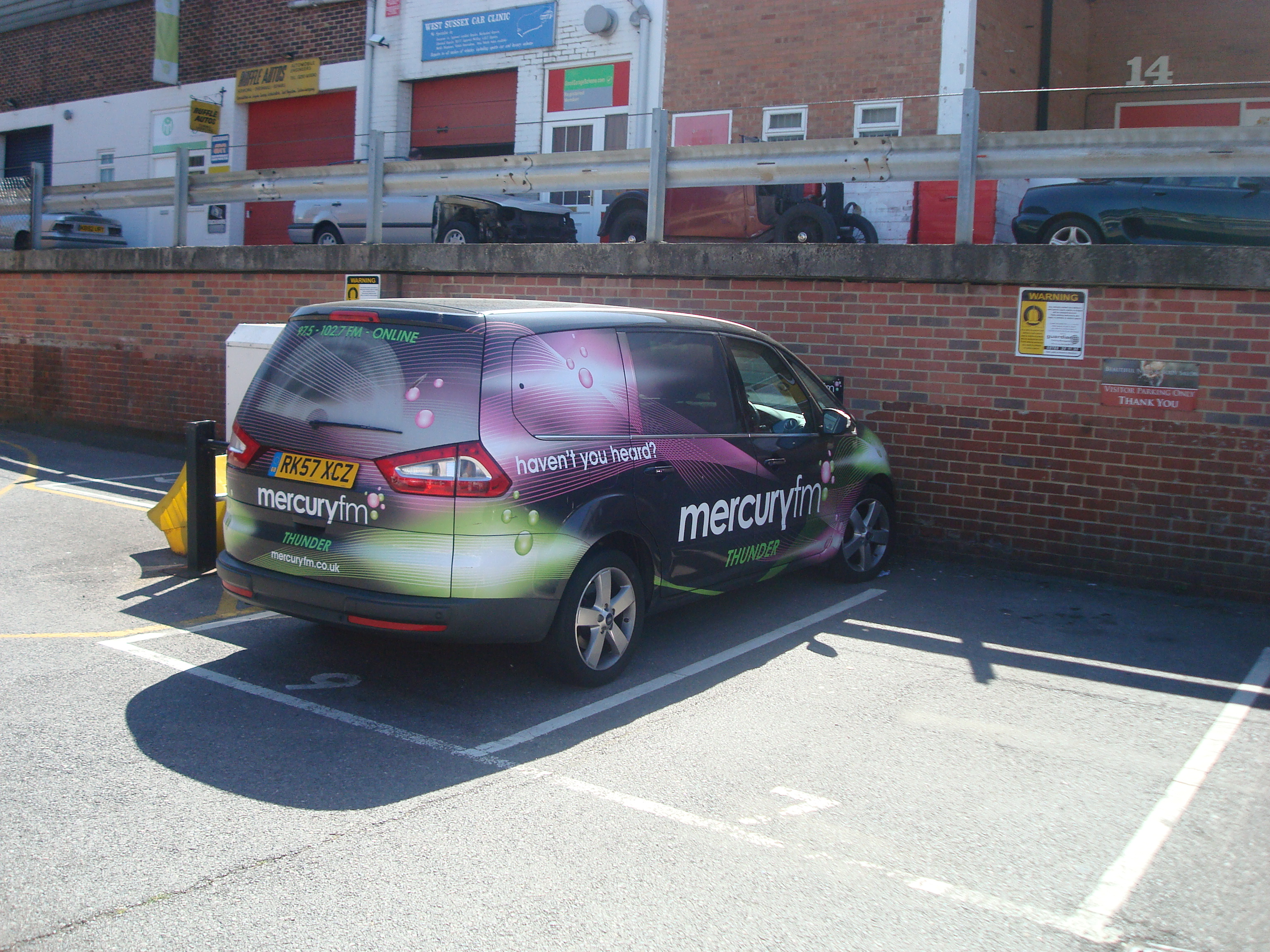
A Mercury FM promotional vehicle

The regional station originally broadcast as two separate stations - Southern Sound began broadcasting to Brighton and parts of West Sussex in August 1983 and Mercury FM broadcast to the Reigate and Crawley areas from October 1984 onwards. In addition, Southern Sound ran a separate broadcasting service for East Sussex from February 1989 until the Radio Authority merged the two licences for East and West Sussex to form one station.

Under the ownership of Global Radio, Southern FM was rebranded as Heart Sussex on 22 June 2009 while Mercury FM retained its local identity and became part of The Hit Music Network. By this time, both stations' local output had become restricted to breakfast and weekday drivetime programming only.

On 21 June 2010, Global Radio announced it would merge the two stations as part of plans to restructure the Heart Network. The new station began broadcasting from Brighton on Monday 26 July 2010, with a sales office and newsroom retained in Crawley.

=== Station merger ===
On 26 February 2019, Global announced Heart Sussex and Surrey would be merged with three sister stations in Hampshire and Dorset, Kent and the Thames Valley.

From 3 June 2019, local output consisted of a three-hour regional drivetime show on weekdays, alongside localised news bulletins, traffic updates and advertising.

Heart Sussex and Surrey's studios in Brighton closed with operations moving to Fareham, Hampshire - the station ceased local programming on 31 May 2019. Local breakfast and weekend shows were replaced with network programming from London.

Heart South began broadcasting regional programming on 3 June 2019.
