= Heart Thames Valley =

Coordinates: 51.4422°N 1.0372°W

Reading; England
- Broadcast area: Berkshire, Oxfordshire, north Hampshire and parts of west Buckinghamshire
- Frequencies: FM: 97.0 (Reading); 97.4 (Banbury and Brackley); 102.6 (Oxford, Bicester, Didcot, Abingdon, Finstock, Shipton-under-Wychwood, Radley, Buckingham, Islip, Charlbury, Tackley, Ascott-under-Wychwood, Combe, Appleford-on-Thames, Kingham, Culham, Heyford, Hanborough, Cholsey, Wallington, Goring-on-Thames, Shiplake, Streatley, King's Sutton, Pangbourne, Tilehurst, Faringdon, Stonesfield, Chipping Norton, Eynsham, Winnersh. Mortimer, Saunderton, Wokingham, Princes Risborough, Sheepwash Channel, Burford, Woodstock, Wallingford, Thame, Bampton, Wantage, Minster Lovell, and Witney); 102.9 (Basingstoke, Streatley and Whitchurch); 103.4 (Henley-on-Thames) DAB: 10B (Oxfordshire) 12D (Reading and Basingstoke)
- Branding: This is Heart

Programming
- Format: Adult Contemporary

Ownership
- Owner: Global

History
- First air date: 9 July 2010
- Last air date: 3 June 2019

Links
- Website: Heart Thames Valley

Heart Thames Valley was a local radio station owned and operated by Global Radio as part of the Heart network. It broadcast to Berkshire, Oxfordshire, north Hampshire and parts of west Buckinghamshire from studios in Reading, southern England.

The station was formed as a result of a merger between Heart Oxfordshire (formerly Fox FM) and Heart Berkshire (formerly 2-Ten FM).

== History ==
The station originally broadcast as two separate stations. Fox FM served Oxfordshire and West Buckinghamshire and was latterly owned by Capital Radio. Radio 210, later 2-Ten FM, served Berkshire and North Hampshire and was eventually acquired by the GWR Group forming part of GWR's Mix Network. This later merged with Capital's equivalent Capital FM network (comprising the former Invicta FM, the former Southern FM, BRMB, Red Dragon FM and the former Power FM) to form The One Network, after the GWR Group plc and Capital Radio Group plc merged in May 2005. Global Radio acquired GCap Media in 2008 and rebranded most of the One Network stations to Heart, in phases by area, from January 2009.

On 21 June 2010, Global Radio announced it would merge the Oxford and Reading stations as part of plans to reduce the Heart network of stations from 33 to 16. The new station began broadcasting from Reading on Friday 9 July 2010, leading to the closure of studios in Oxford.

The stations still carried local advertising and travel bulletins, and accordingly were sub-branded as "Heart Thames Valley for Oxfordshire" and "Heart Thames Valley for Berkshire and NW Hampshire".

=== Station merger ===
On 26 February 2019, Global announced Heart Thames Valley would be merged with three sister stations in Hampshire and Dorset, Kent and Sussex and Surrey.

From 3 June 2019, local output will consist of a three-hour regional Drivetime show on weekdays, alongside localised news bulletins, traffic updates and advertising.

Heart Thames Valley ceased local programming on 31 May 2019, although the station's Reading studios were retained as offices for newsgathering and sales. Local breakfast and weekend shows were replaced with network programming from London.

Heart South began broadcasting regional programming on 3 June 2019.
