= Heart East Anglia =

Norwich; England
- Broadcast area: Norfolk and Suffolk
- Frequencies: 96.4 FM (West Suffolk); 97.1 FM (Ipswich); 102.4 FM (Norfolk)
- RDS: Heart

Programming
- Format: Hot AC

Ownership
- Owner: Global

History
- First air date: 3 September 2010
- Last air date: 3 June 2019

Heart East Anglia was a local radio station owned and operated by Global Radio as part of the Heart network. It broadcast to Norfolk and Suffolk from studios in Norwich.

The station launched on Friday 3 September 2010 as a result of a merger between Heart Norwich (formerly Radio Broadland) and Heart Ipswich (formerly Radio Orwell and Saxon Radio, latterly SGR FM).

== History ==
The regional station originally broadcast as three separate stations - Radio Orwell served Ipswich and surrounding areas since October 1975. In November 1982, Saxon Radio launched in west Suffolk from studios in Bury St. Edmonds, acting as an effective opt-out service to Orwell. Meanwhile, Radio Broadland began broadcasting to Norfolk and north Suffolk in October 1984.

In 1990, Broadland bought out Suffolk Group Radio (the owners of Radio Orwell and Saxon Radio) and formed the East Anglian Radio Group. Two years later, Orwell and Saxon were merged into SGR FM - which launched a sister station in Essex, SGR Colchester, in October 1993.

By 1996, the GWR Group had bought out the East Anglian Radio Group. In January 2009, both Broadland and SGR were among the first stations to rebranded under the Heart moniker after GCap Media's takeover by Global Radio the year before.

On 21 June 2010, Global Radio announced it would merge the five stations as part of plans to reduce the Heart network of stations from 33 to 18. The new station began broadcasting on Friday 3 September 2010 from studios in Norwich, leading to the closure of studios in Ipswich.

=== Station merger ===
On 26 February 2019, Global announced Heart East Anglia would be merged with three sister stations - Heart Cambridgeshire, Heart Essex and Heart Four Counties.

From 3 June 2019, local output will consist of a three-hour regional Drivetime show on weekdays, alongside localised news bulletins, traffic updates and advertising.

Heart East Anglia's studios in Norwich closed with operations moving to Milton Keynes - the station ceased local programming on 31 May 2019. Local breakfast and weekend shows were with network programming from London.

Heart East began broadcasting regional programming on 3 June 2019.

== Former presenters ==
- Sarah Cawood
