= Heart Solent =

Coordinates: 50°51′15.47″N 1°11′18.29″W

Fareham (Segensworth); England
- Broadcast area: South and West Hampshire, South and East Dorset, West Sussex, Weymouth and Isle of Wight
- Frequencies: FM: 96.7 MHz; 97.5 MHz; 102.3 MHz; DAB: 220.352 (11C); 218.64 (11B)
- Branding: This is Heart

Programming
- Format: Adult Contemporary

Ownership
- Owner: Global

History
- First air date: 30 July 2010 (Regional)
- Last air date: 3 June 2019

Technical information
- ERP: 450W 850W 2kW

Links
- Website: Heart Solent

Heart Solent was a local radio station owned and operated by Global Radio as part of the Heart network. It broadcast to southern and western parts of Hampshire, West Sussex, Dorset and Isle of Wight.

The station launched on 30 July 2010 as a result of a merger between Heart Hampshire (formerly Ocean Sound) and Heart Dorset & New Forest (formerly 2CR).

== History ==
The regional station originally broadcast as two separate stations – Two Counties Radio (2CR) began broadcasting to East Dorset and West Hampshire in September 1980. Ocean Sound served South Hampshire, West Sussex and Isle of Wight from October 1986 onwards.

At first, Ocean broadcast two distinct services for the east and west of its service area with a further service for the Winchester area launching in December 1987. The West service was relaunched as Power FM (later Capital South Coast) a year later while the north and east services (The Light FM and Ocean Sound) merged in 1992.

Both 2CR and Ocean underwent various ownership changes until its current owners Global Radio rebranded the stations as Heart on 22 June 2009.

On 21 June 2010, Global Radio announced it would merge both stations as part of plans to reduce the Heart network of stations from 33 to 16. The new station began broadcasting from Segensworth, near Whiteley on Friday 30 July 2010, leading to the closure of studios in Bournemouth.

=== Station merger ===
On 26 February 2019, Global announced Heart Solent would be merged with three sister stations in Kent, Sussex & Surrey and the Thames Valley.

From 3 June 2019, local output will consist of a three-hour regional Drivetime show on weekdays, alongside localised news bulletins, traffic updates and advertising. Local breakfast and weekend shows were replaced with network programming from London.

Heart South began broadcasting regional programming from the Fareham studios on 3 June 2019.

== Former presenters ==
- Lucy Horobin (Now at Heart Dance)
- Jason King (Now at Heart London)
- Michael Underwood (now at Virgin Radio Groove)

== Availability and transmitters ==
=== Analogue (FM) ===
Transmitter site	Frequency	Power	RDS name	PI code	Area	County
Crabwood Farm	96.7 MHz	450W	Heart___	C365 (C565 Switched)	Winchester, Eastleigh, and Southampton	Hampshire
Fort Widley	97.5 MHz	850W	Heart___	C365 (C465 Switched)	Portsmouth, Fareham, Chichester and Isle of Wight	Hampshire and West Sussex
Nine Barrow Down	102.3 MHz	2000W	HEART___	C365 (C665 Switched)	Swanage, Weymouth, Ringwood, Isle of Portland, Bournemouth and Poole	Dorset and Hampshire

=== Digital (DAB) ===
Multiplex name	Bitrate	Short label	Long label	SID
NOW Bournemouth	128kbit/s	Heart	Heart Dorset	C665
NOW South Hampshire	112kbit/s	Heart Hs	Heart Hampshire	C365
