= Heart Cambridgeshire =

Peterborough; England
- Broadcast area: Cambridgeshire, Huntingdonshire and eastern Northamptonshire
- Frequencies: FM: Suffolk; 97.4 (Haverhill and Newmarket), Cambridge; 102.7 (Peterborough); 103.0 (Cambridge); DAB: 10C (Suffolk); DAB: 11C (Arqiva Cambridge); DAB: 12D (Now Digital Peterborough)
- Branding: This is Heart

Programming
- Format: Adult Contemporary

Ownership
- Owner: Global

History
- First air date: 2 July 2010

Links
- Website: Heart Cambridgeshire

Heart Cambridgeshire was a local radio station owned and operated by Global Radio as part of the Heart network. It broadcast to Cambridgeshire, Huntingdonshire and eastern Northamptonshire and parts of surrounding counties from studios in Cambridge.

== History ==
The regional station originally broadcast as two separate stations - Hereward Radio began broadcasting to Peterborough in July 1980 and Q103 (formally CNFM) served the Cambridge and Newmarket areas since February 1989.

By 1995, both stations had been sold off to the GWR Group. Ten years later, the owners merged with Capital Radio to form GCap Media (later Global Radio). The stations were among the first outside London and the Midlands to be rebranded as Heart in 2009.

On 21 June 2010, Global Radio announced it would merge the two stations as part of plans to reduce the Heart network of stations from 33 to 18. The new station began broadcasting from Peterborough on Friday 2 July 2010, leading to the closure of studios in Cambridge.

On 19 September 2011, the station announced it would leave its Peterborough base and relocate to new studios in the Histon area of Cambridge.

=== Station merger ===
On 26 February 2019, Global announced Heart Cambridgeshire would be merged with three sister-stations - Heart East Anglia, Heart Essex and Heart Four Counties.

Heart Cambridgeshire's studios in Cambridge closed with operations moving to Milton Keynes - the station ceased local programming on 31 May 2019. Local breakfast and weekend shows were replaced with network programming from London.

From 3 June 2019, local output has consisted of a three-hour regional Drivetime show on weekdays, alongside localised news bulletins, traffic updates and advertising.
