= Heart Dorset & New Forest =

Former British radio station

Heart Dorset

England
- Broadcast area: Bournemouth & Poole East Dorset and West Hampshire
- Frequencies: FM: 102.3 MHz; DAB: 11B (Bournemouth)

Ownership
- Owner: Global Radio

History
- First air date: (as 2CR) 15 September 1980
- Last air date: 30 July 2010

Links
- Website: www.heart.co.uk/dorset/

Heart Dorset (formerly 2CR – Two Counties Radio) was a British Independent Local Radio station, broadcast from studios at a former branch of MFI on Southcote Road in Bournemouth. Its original name was derived from the fact that its broadcast area included parts of the counties of Dorset and Hampshire. The station was merged with Heart Hampshire in July 2010 to form the regional station Heart South Coast.

== History ==
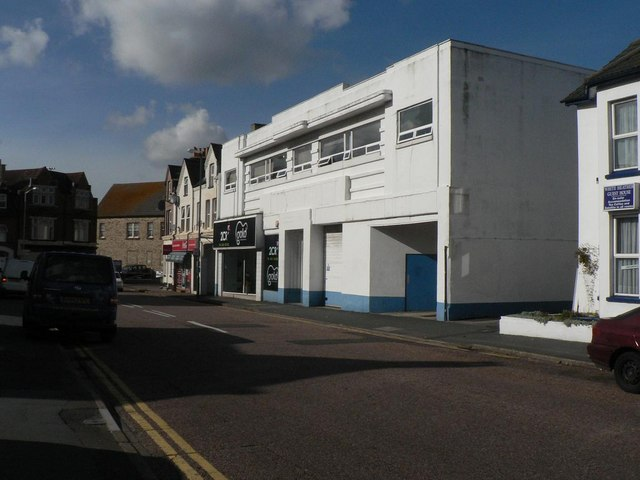
Former 2CR FM/Heart Dorset studios

Former BBC Radio Solent presenter John Piper launched the station in 1980, with the words Good Morning Hampshire, Good Morning Dorset. At that time, 2CR consisted of a full service station with music, personalities, phone-ins, and a local news service. Managing Director for the first three years, was Norman Bilton who joined them from Metro Radio in Newcastle. The station's longest serving staff member was office manager Rosemary Mundy, who worked for the station from its launch until 2009.

The station originally broadcast on 828 kHz medium wave using AM from a transmitter at Fern Barrow, and on 97.2 MHz FM from a transmitter in Poole. The station's FM frequency moved to 102.3 MHz from a transmitter at Nine Barrow Down on the Isle of Purbeck in March 1990. The same year, the AM frequency was split off to become Classic Gold 828.

The station, which by this time had become known as 2CR FM, broadcast on DAB from the launch of the Bournemouth multiplex in 2002. The station was rebranded Heart by its new owners Global Radio in 2009. On 21 June 2010, Global Radio announced plans to close the station and merge it with Heart Hampshire as part of plans to reduce the Heart network of stations from 33 to 16. The new station, Heart South Coast, began from Fareham on 30 July 2010.

Global Radio changed the programming on the 828 kHz frequency to Smooth Radio (Dorset and Hampshire) in 2014. AM transmissions on 828kHz were discontinued in June 2023.

== Notable past presenters ==
- Seán Street
- Fran Godfrey
- Martyn Lee
- Bam Bam
- Charlie Wolf
- Christian O'Connell
- Dan O'Hagan
