= Heart Essex (regional) =

Chelmsford; England
- Broadcast area: Essex and East Hertfordshire
- Frequencies: FM: 96.1 (Colchester); 96.3 (Basildon, Billericay, Canvey Island & Wickford); 97.5 (Southend-on-Sea); 101.7 (Harlow & Epping); 102.6 (Chelmsford)
- RDS: Heart SX

Programming
- Format: Adult Contemporary

Ownership
- Owner: Global

History
- First air date: 26 July 2010
- Last air date: 31 May 2019

Links
- Website: Heart Essex

Heart Essex was a local radio station owned and operated by Global Radio as part of the Heart network. It broadcast to Essex and East Hertfordshire from studios in Chelmsford.

The station launched on Monday 26 July 2010 as a result of a merger between Heart Essex (Chelmsford & Southend) (formerly Essex FM), Heart Colchester (formerly SGR Colchester) and Ten 17.

== History ==
The regional station originally broadcast as three separate stations - Essex Radio began broadcasting to the Southend-on-Sea area in September 1981 and to Chelmsford three months later. Harlow's Ten 17 launched in May 1993 as a part-time opt out from Essex FM and later expanded to become a fully separate service. Meanwhile, SGR Colchester began broadcasting as an offshoot of Ipswich's SGR FM in October 1993.

Essex FM and Ten 17 originally came under the ownership of the Essex Radio Group while SGR Colchester was owned by East Anglian Radio, which was brought up in 1996 by GWR Group - within four years, the two other ILR stations in Essex came under GWR ownership.

SGR Colchester was among the first stations to be rebranded under the Heart moniker in January 2009 and followed six months later by Essex FM. As a Hit Music Network station, Ten 17 retained its local identity - but as with the Heart stations in Chelmsford and Colchester, local output had been restricted to breakfast and weekday drivetime shows.

On 21 June 2010, Global Radio announced plans to merge all three stations as part of plans to restructuring plans for Heart. The new station, Heart Essex, began broadcasting from Chelmsford on Monday 26 July 2010, leading to the closure of studios in Colchester and Harlow.

=== Station merger ===
On 26 February 2019, Global announced Heart Essex would be merged with three sister stations - Heart Cambridgeshire, Heart East Anglia and Heart Four Counties.

From 3 June 2019, local output consists of a three-hour regional Drivetime show on weekdays, alongside localised news bulletins, traffic updates and advertising.

Heart Essex's studios in Chelmsford closed with operations moving to Milton Keynes - the station ceased local programming on 31 May 2019. Local breakfast and weekend shows were replaced with network programming from London.

Heart East began broadcasting regional programming on 3 June 2019.
