= Heart Gloucestershire =

Former British radio station

- Gloucester; England
- Broadcast area: Gloucestershire
- Frequencies: FM: Quedgeley; 102.4; Stroud: 103.0; DAB: 10C Arqiva Gloucestershire
- Branding: This is Heart

Programming
- Format: Hot AC

Ownership
- Owner: Global

History
- First air date: 23 October 1980
- Last air date: 3 June 2019

Technical information
- Power: 1.2 kW
- Transmitter coordinates: 51.8684°N 2.1736°W

Links
- Website: www.heart.co.uk/gloucestershire/

Heart Gloucestershire (formerly Severn Sound) was a British Independent Local Radio station owned and operated by Global Radio as part of the Heart network. It broadcast to Gloucestershire from studios in Gloucester.

The transmitter, shared with Radio Gloucestershire, is at Churchdown Hill, just west of the M5.

== History ==
Severn Sound started transmissions on 23 October 1980, from its first studio at the "Old Talbot" pub in Southgate Street, Gloucester. The pub had been bought by local businessmen including Clive Lindley, chairman of the Roadchef motorway service stations and of Severn Sound. The station's first employee was Chief Engineer Quentin Howard, who converted the pub into the radio station.

The original presenters were Alan Roberts, Head of Music, on Breakfast, Christopher Musk on mid-mornings, Eddie Vickers, Programme Controller, on the Lunchtime News and Topical programme, Laura de Vere on the Afternoon Show and Steve Ellis on Drivetime. There was a Sunday lunchtime show in which the presenter would go to various areas of Gloucester and share Sunday lunch with the residents of a house.

One notable director was the writer Dennis Potter, who played an active role in the station's early years and lived in Ross on Wye. Potter's Pennies from Heaven producer, Kenith Trodd, presented a Sunday programme of 78 records featuring singers including Al Bowlly, which Todd and Potter had used in Pennies from Heaven. Another director was England rugby player Mike Burton, who also started sports travel agency Gulliver's Travels.

On 1 July 1984 two of the station's engineers, Nigel Lane and Tony Cooper, were killed on an outside broadcast when the telescopic mast of their radio car touched an overhead 11 kV power line while they were preparing for a live broadcast from Sudeley Castle, Winchcombe. The inquiry into the accident found Severn Sound guilty of health and safety offences and fined the company £2,500. Many new safety procedures for radio cars were introduced across the industry as a result of the accident.

The station was sold to the Chiltern Radio Group, after some resistance, in 1989, and was later taken over by the GWR Group in 1995, which merged into GCap Media in 2005, and was sold to Global Radio in 2008.

During the Gloucester/Tewkesbury flood crisis of Summer 2007, Severn Sound was forced to move temporarily to the GWR FM Bristol Studios, due to a loss of electricity and running water.

=== Split frequencies ===
In 1990, Severn Sound split frequencies, with its 774 kHz AM frequency being renamed Three Counties Radio, expanding to cover Hereford & Worcester. This was an "oldies" station and was a mix of local programmes and networking from Chiltern Radio Network's Supergold service. Presenters who moved from Severn Sound to Three Counties included Tony Peters & Sally Low Hurry. John Hellings was brought in as breakfast presenter. In 1992, Three Counties Radio was re-branded as Severn Sound Supergold (and no longer promoted in Hereford & Worcester), and was re-branded again, in 1996, by new owners GWR as Severn Sound Classic Gold. Ownership rules required GWR to sell all their Classic Gold licences, to UBC Media, and another re-brand to Classic Gold 774 followed. The heritage name "Severn" is no longer mentioned on 774 AM after it was re-branded again, in 2007, to Gold, and again on 24 March 2014 to Smooth Radio. All programming on 774 AM now comes from London.

=== Rebrand ===
In September 2008 Severn Sound became Heart Gloucestershire as part of a national re-branding of 29 stations by owners Global Radio.

The Heart Gloucestershire branding was launched at 6am on Monday 23 March 2009, with local programming broadcast from the above-the-street Bridge Studios, part of the Eastgate Shopping Centre (The Mall) in Gloucester. Local news bulletins on the station are produced by Heart West in Bristol, following the closure of the station's Gloucester newsroom in summer 2010.

=== Station merger ===
In 2019 Heart Gloucestershire merged with three sister stations in Bristol and Somerset, Devon and Cornwall and Wiltshire. From 3 June 2019, local output will became a three-hour regional Drivetime show on weekdays, with local news bulletins, traffic updates and advertising.

Heart Gloucestershire's studios in Gloucester closed, with operations moving to Bristol. The station ceased local programming on 31 May 2019. Local breakfast and weekend shows were replaced with network programming from London.

Heart West began broadcasting regional programming on 3 June 2019.

== See also ==
- Heart (radio network)
