= Heart Northants =

Coordinates: 52.2398°N 0.88662°W

Northampton; England
- Broadcast area: Northamptonshire
- Frequency: 96.6 MHz
- RDS: Heart
- Branding: Heart

Programming
- Format: Hot AC

Ownership
- Owner: Global Radio

History
- First air date: 30 November 1986
- Last air date: 16 July 2010

Links
- Website: Station website

Heart Northants (formerly Northants 96) was an Independent Local Radio station serving Northamptonshire.

The station broadcast on 96.6 FM from studios in Northampton town centre, via the transmitter located in the Kingsthorpe area. As of August 2011 the station merged with Heart Dunstable and Heart Bedford to become Heart Four Counties and now has its studios from Central Milton Keynes. It is owned and operated by Global Radio as a part of the Heart Network.

== History ==
=== The start of commercial local radio in Northamptonshire ===
Hereward Radio was the first Independent Local Radio franchise for the county, providing programmes for Northamptonshire, Milton Keynes and Rugby from 1 October 1984, using its former FM frequency of 102.8 MHz and 1557 kHz medium wave. The station launched at 1 am, while disc jockey John Warwick hosted its morning show, Hereward Daybreak the following morning.

Local radio frequencies on the FM band in the United Kingdom were expanded and re-organised to form 'sub-bands' (104–105 MHz were reserved for BBC Local Radio, whereas 96.1–97.7 MHz were attributed to Independent Local Radio). This affected Northamptonshire as follows:

- BBC Radio Northampton (96.6 FM) moved to 104.2 FM and 103.6 FM
- Northamptonshire ILR (102.8 FM) moved to 96.6 FM.

Shortly afterwards, due to general difficulties within the commercial radio industry at the time Hereward withdrew from Northamptonshire and continued in Peterborough. In 1985, the Independent Broadcasting Authority assigned the Independent Local Radio franchise to a new company, Northants Radio Ltd, owned by Chiltern Radio Group.

Northants 96 launched at 10.00 am on 30 November 1986 with announcer Tony West introducing the first regular programmes on the station. Following a synthesised alarm clock ticking saying: "Good Morning. 10 am, Sunday 30 November 1986, and this is the new sound of radio in Northamptonshire- Northants 96!" followed by a station identification jingle and a welcome message from the then Lord Lieutenant of Northamptonshire and the first song to be played was "I Can Hear Music" by The Beach Boys.

Notable disc jockeys on Northants included Northants' first breakfast show, future well-known hypnotist Paul McKenna and David Prever, who would later move to Wiltshire's GWR FM

Its to be noted that Northants 96 and Northants Radio were interchangeable names for the station and relayed programmes on a mediumwave frequency – 1557 kHz, which opened on 25 June 1990.

=== The Hot FM and SuperGold ===
Northants 96 was essentially part of a regional collective of commercial stations which included Chiltern Radio, based in Dunstable and Bedford. Station directors had to tackle a major concern in the area; "how do you make this station appear more 'local' than the previous incumbent, while saving money at the same time?" The result was that programmes were syndicated from Chiltern headquarters in Dunstable during the day, consisting of popular middle of the road music whilst 'opting out' for hourly local news bulletins. Thus The Hot FM sustaining service was born.

The Chiltern Radio Group did this by making use of new technology whereby a disc-jockey interjects with an identification jingle during a networked/syndicated programme by pressing a button with the result that depending on where the listener was, either "Northants 96- The Hot FM" or "Chiltern Radio 97 – The Hot FM" was heard. This solved the problem of inexpensive local radio with the added benefit of totally opting out of the network for local emergencies, for example snow reports or flooding information. However, after a time, some shows such as breakfast, mid morning and drive time were localised with each Chiltern Network station broadcasting individual shows.

In 1988, the Home Office declared that the independent local radio industry was able to support a permanent split in AM-FM broadcasting and decided to enforce this rule through the IBA. All ILR stations were required to broadcast separate programming or lose their licences. The Chiltern Radio Network responded to this by launching its second sustaining service, SuperGold, on 15 July 1990. SuperGold was a general golden oldies station broadcasting to Herts, Beds, Bucks and Cambridge on the medium wave band with Northants Radio SuperGold following suit. Both the classic and contemporary FM and the oldies AM stations were rated very highly, consistently beating its local competitor BBC Radio Northampton.

=== A better music mix, a hostile takeover ===
The Chiltern Radio Group, then a plc received a hostile takeover bid from GWR Group plc in 1995 which was reluctantly accepted. This affected both FM and AM stations and networked programming- The Hot FM closed and associated stations were rebranded "The New______- A Better Music Mix" while SuperGold was absorbed into GWR Group's existing Classic Gold network.

Northants Radio however was less affected by this major change than other stations in the enlarged group (Chiltern Radio for example) becoming The New Northants 96 whereas its AM station Northants Radio SuperGold became Classic Gold 1557. The significance of this takeover was more resources meant a more local service; up to 15 hours a day were broadcast locally on FM as opposed to a mere 4 under "The Hot FM" whilst Classic Gold retained 8 hours.

Programming-wise Northants Radio underwent a subtle shift towards more upbeat contemporary and chart hits and less in the way of talk. A past slogan voiced by Eddy Temple-Morris claimed that "other radio stations talked over the end of songs, whilst we didn't- That's the Northants 96 difference". This over time evolved into the Better Music Mix of the 80s 90s and today and Today's Best Mix for Northamptonshire.

Shortly after Northants' former owner GWR Group merged with Capital Radio plc to form GCap Media in 2005, Northants 96 adopted the slogan "More music variety". In 2008, GCap Media's radio and music assets were purchased by Global Radio.

=== More music variety arrives ===
On 5 January 2009, Northants 96 was rebranded Heart, along with Dunstable-based Chiltern Radio and other Global-owned stations in the East of England. Heart Northamptonshire reduced its weekday local output from 12 hours to seven.

On 21 June 2010, Global Radio announced plans to close Heart Northants and merge the station with Heart Milton Keynes, Heart Dunstable and Heart Bedford as part of plans to reduce the Heart network of stations from 33 to 16. The new station, Heart Home Counties (later Heart Four Counties), began broadcasting from Dunstable on 16 July 2010. Networked and local programming on the merged station are now similar, except for commercial breaks, which are still split locally. Heart's Northampton base in the town centre were closed as early as March 2011, with the station expected to be broadcast from new premises in Milton Keynes.
