= Heart Sussex =

Independent Local Radio station in Sussex, United Kingdom

Heart Sussex Also operating as Heart Sussex for Crawley & Surrey in certain areas

England
- Broadcast area: East Sussex and parts of West Sussex (as Heart Sussex) and Crawley and Surrey as Heart Sussex for Crawley & Surrey. Broadcasts to Chichester by DAB radio.
- Frequencies: FM: 96.9 (Peacehaven); 102.0 (St Leonards-on-Sea); 102.4 (Hailsham) and 103.5 (Brighton & Hove); DAB: 10B (Sussex Coast) Heart Sussex for Crawley & Surrey: FM: 97.5 (Horsham) MHz; 102.7 (Redhill and Reigate) MHz; DAB: 10C (Surrey and South London) RDS: HEART
- Branding: Heart Network

Programming
- Format: Adult Contemporary

Ownership
- Owner: Global Radio

History
- First air date: (as Southern Sound) 29 August 1983 / Re-branded 'Heart', 22 June 2009 / Heart Sussex for Crawley and Surrey, 26 July 2010

Links
- Website: Heart Sussex & Heart Sussex for Crawley & Surrey

Heart Sussex (previously Southern FM, also operating as Heart Sussex for Crawley & Surrey in Crawley and Surrey) was an Independent Local Radio station which was owned by Global Radio (formerly GCap Media) and played commercial, chart-oriented popular music. Broadcast and managed from studios and offices in Portslade, Brighton and Crawley, the station played a mix of pop, rock and RnB with the overall tag line being 'The station for Sussex and Surrey' – replacing Mercury FM.

On 17 September 2008, it was announced that Southern FM was one of 30 local radio stations to face a re-brand to Heart within the next 18 months. Southern FM was rebranded as Heart Sussex on 22 June 2009. Mercury FM also merged with Heart in July 2010 to be re branded and re-launched as a sub-section of Heart Sussex operating as Heart Sussex for Crawley & Surrey or simply Heart Crawley & Surrey – sharing the same programming output.

== History ==
The station launched as Southern Sound from the converted Rothbury Cinema in Franklin Road, Portslade. Under the leadership of managing director Keith Belcher and programme director Rory Macleod, early presenters included Sean Bolger, Louis Robinson, Stewart Macintosh, Vince Geddes, John Mann, Russ Williams and Becky Manesseh. The head of news at launch was Paul Woodley with a reporting team including Andy Steggall, Andrew Winter and Cornelius Lysaght.

Southern FM's final logo

Tommy Boyd joined the station, initially as a fill-in for Timbo (Tim Lloyd) and was subsequently hired to present a regular Sunday evening show with a team of assistants including Nicky Keig-Shevlin.

At the launch of the station, Southern Sound broadcast only to Brighton and parts of West Sussex. In 1987, transmissions were extended to Lewes, Newhaven and Seaford. Then on 5 February 1989, the station won a new licence for East Sussex too. Initially running split programming for East and West Sussex, the station now only splits for commercial breaks.

In 1994 the Radio Authority merged the two licences to become one official ILR licence.

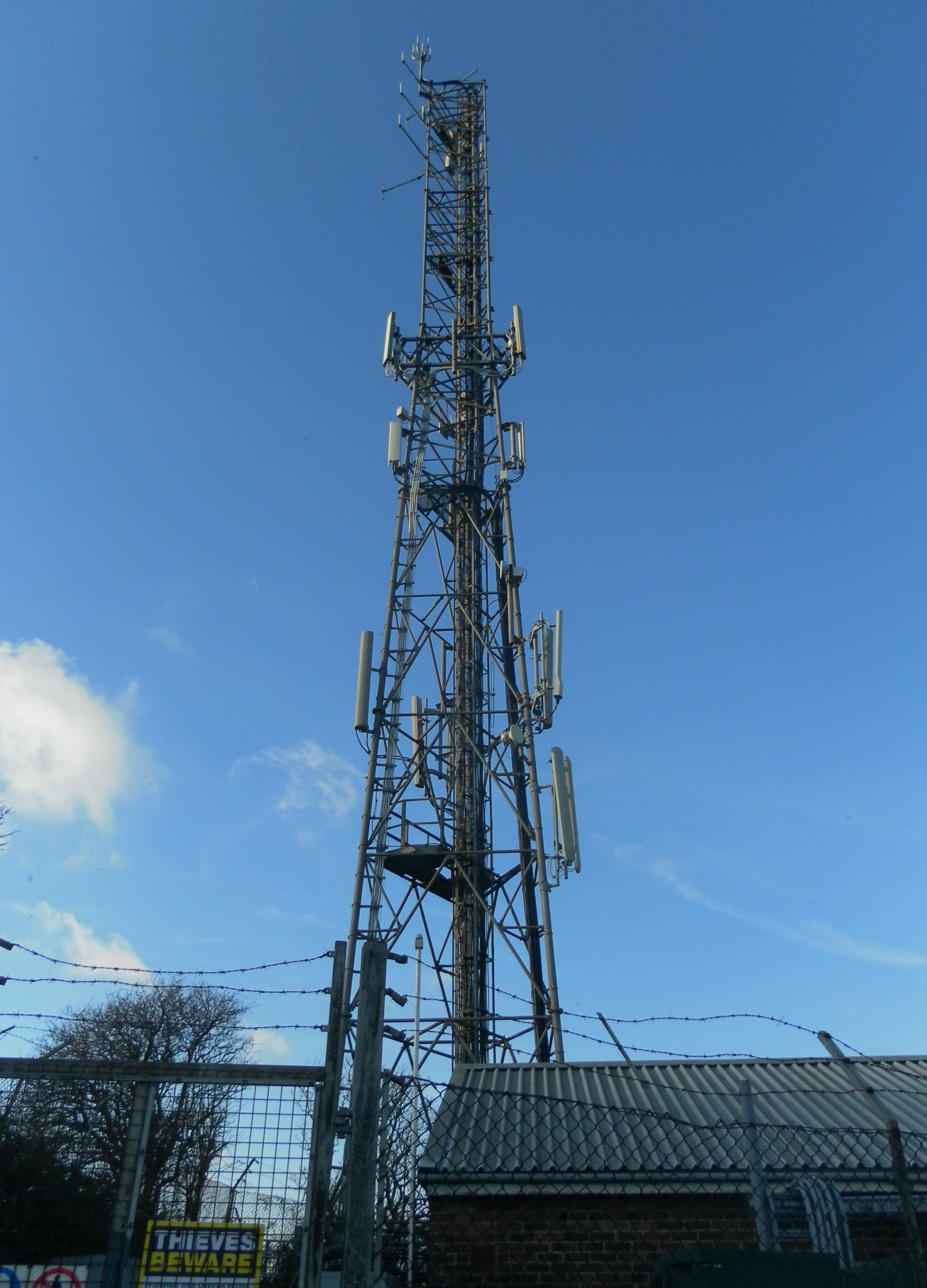
The Whitehawk Hill transmitter, Brighton, has transmitted Heart Sussex

The station broadcasts to the following areas:

- Analogue VHF FM
  - 96.9 MHz - Newhaven Transmitter
  - 102.0 MHz – Hastings Transmitter
  - 102.4 MHz – East and West Sussex, including Eastbourne (Heathfield Transmitter)
  - 103.5 MHz – Brighton and Worthing (Whitehawk Hill Transmitter)
- DAB Digital Radio: Block 10B 211.648 MHz
  - Worthing (Findon Transmitter)
  - Newhaven (Newhaven Transmitter)
  - Hastings (Hastings Transmitter)
  - Eastbourne (Eastbourne Transmitter)
  - Chichester (Burton Down Transmitter)
  - Brighton (Whitehawk Hill Transmitter)
  - Crawley (Little Prestwood Farm Transmitter)
  - East Sussex (Heathfield Transmitter)
  - Central Sussex (Truleigh Hill Transmitter)
- Heart Crawley & Surrey broadcast to the following areas on FM:
  - 97.5 MHz – Horsham Transmitter
  - 102.7 MHz – Reigate Transmitter

Since Heart and Mercury FM merged. Heart Sussex has taken over Mercury's frequencies, on both the Reigate and Horsham transmitters.

== Network restructuring ==
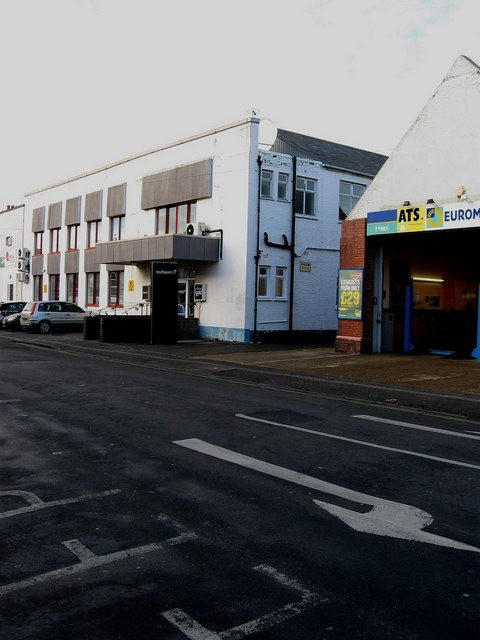
Radio House, Portslade, a former home of Heart Sussex

On 21 June 2010, Global Radio announced plans to merge Heart Sussex with the station Mercury FM as part of plans to reduce the Heart network of stations from 33 to 16. The newly merged Heart Sussex and Surrey station began broadcasting from Brighton on 26 July 2010.

The merged Heart brought the addition of an additional sub-station, Heart Crawley & Surrey operates operationally separately. Sales are dealt with by a separate team (based in Crawley) – they may be based in Brighton in the near future though. In addition, to this Heart Crawley & Surrey also has a different website. On air though, both stations broadcast/simulcast the same core coverage with the exception of adverts (and select news features). Mercury FM and Heart have now completed the switchover and for the time being are operating out of both addresses.

Radio House, Portslade, the previous home of Southern FM and recently a broadcasting station for Heart Sussex, was put on the market in 2019. Heart Sussex was to be merged with Capital Brighton radio station. The website is now called Heart, with a page for Sussex.
