= Independent Local Radio =

Commercial radio stations in the United Kingdom

Logo used by the Independent Broadcasting Authority for promoting Independent Local Radio services in the 1980s.

Independent Local Radio is the collective name given to commercial radio stations in the United Kingdom.

As a result of the buyouts and mergers permitted by the Broadcasting Act 1990, deregulation resulting from the Communications Act 2003 and further deregulation from the Media Act 2024, most commercial stations are now neither independent (although they remain independent from the BBC) nor local, as almost all of them are now relays of a national brand, with remaining locality reduced to nothing more than localised commercials, news (which may be from the approved area region), weather and peak-time travel information. Radio stations are licensed and regulated by OfCom.

The same name is used for Independent Local Radio in Ireland.

== History ==
=== Development of ILR ===
Until the early 1970s, the BBC had a legal monopoly on radio broadcasting in the UK. Despite competition from the commercial Radio Luxembourg, it had remained the policy of both major political parties that radio was to remain under the BBC.

In the 1960s, a number of unlicensed "pirate radio" stations became popular, often avoiding the law by operating offshore until the passing of the Marine, &c., Broadcasting (Offences) Act 1967.

This policy changed after the election of Edward Heath's government in 1970. It is possible that Heath's victory was partly due to younger voters upset by Harold Wilson's government closing down the popular pirate radio stations.

The new Minister of Post and Telecommunications and former ITN newscaster, Christopher Chataway, announced a bill to allow for the introduction of commercial radio in the United Kingdom. This service would be planned and regulated similarly to the existing ITV service and would compete with the recently developed BBC Local Radio services (rather than the four national BBC services).

The Sound Broadcasting Act 1972 received royal assent on 12 July 1972 and the Independent Television Authority (ITA) accordingly changed its name to the Independent Broadcasting Authority (IBA) that same day.

The IBA immediately began to plan the new service, placing advertisements encouraging interested groups to apply for medium-term contracts to provide programmes in given areas. The first major areas to be advertised were London and Glasgow, with two contracts available in London, one for "news and information", one for "general and entertainment". Contracts were for three years, extendable for one year each year; thus, they were indefinite if the IBA was satisfied with the contractor's performance.

The London news contract was awarded to London Broadcasting Company (LBC) and they began broadcasting on 8 October 1973. The London general contract went to Capital Radio, who began broadcasting on 16 October 1973. In total, 19 contracts were awarded between 1973 and 1976. Due to government limits on capital expenditure and turbulence in the broadcasting field (mainly due to the Annan Report), no further contracts were awarded until 1980, when a second tranche of contracts were awarded. All stations were awarded an AM and an FM frequency, on which they broadcast the same service.

=== Original contracts ===
==== First tranche ====
| Airdate | City | Station name | Current Station name | Owner |
|---|---|---|---|---|
| 8 October 1973 | London | London Broadcasting Company | LBC | Global |
| 16 October 1973 | London | Capital Radio | Capital London | Global |
| 31 December 1973 | Glasgow | Radio Clyde | Clyde 1 | Bauer |
| 19 February 1974 | Birmingham | BRMB | Hits Radio Birmingham | Bauer |
| 2 April 1974 | Manchester | Piccadilly Radio | Hits Radio Manchester | Bauer |
| 15 July 1974 | Newcastle-upon-Tyne | Metro Radio | Hits Radio North East | Bauer |
| 30 September 1974 | Swansea | Swansea Sound | Hits Radio South Wales | Bauer |
| 1 October 1974 | Sheffield & Rotherham | Radio Hallam | Hits Radio South Yorkshire | Bauer |
| 21 October 1974 | Liverpool | Radio City | Hits Radio Liverpool | Bauer |
| 22 January 1975 | Edinburgh | Radio Forth | Forth 1 | Bauer |
| 19 May 1975 | Plymouth | Plymouth Sound | Defunct, now a relay of Heart West | Global |
| 24 June 1975 | Stockton-on-Tees | Radio Tees | Hits Radio Teesside | Bauer |
| 3 July 1975 | Nottingham | Radio Trent | Defunct, now a relay of Capital Midlands | Global |
| 16 September 1975 | Bradford | Pennine Radio | Hits Radio West Yorkshire | Bauer |
| 14 October 1975 | Portsmouth | Radio Victory | Defunct | |
| 28 October 1975 | Ipswich | Radio Orwell | Defunct, now a relay of Heart East | Global |
| 8 March 1976 | Reading | Radio 210 | Defunct, now a relay of Heart South | Global |
| 16 March 1976 | Belfast | Downtown Radio | | Bauer |
| 12 April 1976 | Wolverhampton | Beacon Radio | Hits Radio Black Country & Shropshire | Bauer |

==== Second tranche ====
| Airdate | City | Station name | Current Station name | Owner |
|---|---|---|---|---|
| 11 April 1980 | Cardiff | Cardiff Broadcasting Company | Capital South Wales | Global |
| 23 May 1980 | Coventry | Mercia Sound | Hits Radio Coventry & Warwickshire | Bauer |
| 10 July 1980 | Peterborough | Hereward Radio | Defunct, now a relay of Heart East | Global |
| 15 September 1980 | Bournemouth | 2CR (Two Counties Radio) | Defunct, now a relay of Heart South | Global |
| 17 October 1980 | Dundee | Radio Tay | Tay FM | Bauer |
| 23 October 1980 | Gloucester | Severn Sound | Defunct, now a relay of Heart West | Global |
| 7 November 1980 | Exeter | DevonAir Radio | Defunct, now a relay of Heart West | Global |
| 14 November 1980 | Perth | Radio Tay | Tay FM | Bauer |
| 12 December 1980 | Torbay | DevonAir Radio | Defunct, now a relay of Heart West | Global |
| 27 July 1981 | Aberdeen | Northsound Radio | Northsound 1 | Bauer |
| 1 September 1981 | Leeds | Radio Aire | Greatest Hits Radio West Yorkshire | Bauer |
| 7 September 1981 | Leicester | Centre Radio | Defunct | |
| 12 September 1981 | Southend-on-Sea | Essex Radio | Defunct, now a relay of Heart East | Global |
| 15 October 1981 | Luton | Chiltern Radio | Defunct, now a relay of Heart East | Global |
| 27 October 1981 | Bristol | Radio West | Defunct, now a relay of Heart West | Global |
| 4 December 1981 | Ayr and Girvan | West Sound Radio | Greatest Hits Radio Ayrshire | Bauer |
| 10 December 1981 | Chelmsford | Essex Radio | Defunct, now a relay of Heart East | Global |
| 23 February 1982 | Inverness | Moray Firth Radio | MFR | Bauer |
| 1 March 1982 | Bedford | Chiltern Radio | Defunct, now a relay of Heart East | Global |
| 4 October 1982 | Worcester | Radio Wyvern | Hits Radio Herefordshire & Worcestershire | Bauer |
| 5 October 1982 | Preston | Red Rose Radio | Hits Radio Lancashire | Bauer |
| 12 October 1982 | Swindon | Wiltshire Radio | Defunct, now a relay of Heart West | Global |
| 6 November 1982 | Bury St Edmunds | Saxon Radio | Defunct, now a relay of Heart East | Global |
| 4 April 1983 | Guildford | County Sound | Defunct, now a relay of Greatest Hits Radio South | Bauer |
| 13 June 1983 | Newport | Gwent Broadcasting | Defunct, now a relay of Capital South Wales | Global |
| 29 August 1983 | Brighton | Southern Sound Radio | Defunct, now a relay of Heart South | Global |
| 5 September 1983 | Stoke-on-Trent | Signal Radio | Hits Radio Staffordshire & Cheshire | Bauer |
| 5 September 1983 | Wrexham | Marcher Sound | Defunct, now a relay of Capital North West & Wales | Global |
| 17 April 1984 | Kingston-upon-Hull | Viking Radio | Hits Radio East Yorkshire & North Lincolnshire | Bauer |
| 5 September 1984 | Leicester | Leicester Sound (Note: Launched after failed Centre Radio went into receivership.) | Defunct, now a relay of Capital Midlands | Global |
| 1 October 1984 | Norwich | Radio Broadland | Defunct, now a relay of Heart East | Global |
| 1 October 1984 | Northampton | Hereward Radio | Defunct, now a relay of Heart East | Global |
| 1 October 1984 | East Kent | Invicta Sound | Defunct, now a relay of Heart South | Global |
| 20 October 1984 | Reigate & Crawley | Radio Mercury | Defunct, now a relay of Heart South | Global |
| 12 October 1986 | Southampton and Portsmouth | Ocean Sound | Defunct, now a relay of Heart South | Global |
| 30 November 1986 | Northampton and Northamptonshire | Northants 96 | Defunct, now a relay of Heart East | Global |
| 3 March 1987 | Derby | Radio Trent | Defunct, now a relay of Capital Midlands | Global |
| 22 May 1987 | Bath | GWR Radio Bath | Defunct, now a relay of Heart West | Global |

In July 1981, the Home Secretary approved proposals for the creation of Independent Local Radio services in 25 more areas. However some of these areas were not licensed during the IBA's time as the regulator and did not receive a commercial station until after its successor, The Radio Authority, came into being in 1991.

=== Extension of ILR ===
In the late 1980s, the expansion of ILR continued at a similar rate. Under the Broadcasting Acts, the IBA had a duty to ensure that any area it licensed for radio could support a station with the available advertising revenue. Therefore, many areas were not included in the IBA's ILR plans as it was felt that they were not viable. This did not prevent Radio West in Bristol getting into financial trouble and having to merge with Wiltshire Radio on 1 October 1985; nor did it prevent Centre Radio going into receivership on 6 October 1983.

In the late 1980s and early 1990s, in several areas where ILR stations had not previously been licensed, new local radio licenses were issued in these 'white space' locations which, whilst not part of the historic ILR tranche, operated as the defacto ILR commercial radio services for their broadcast area. As these stations launched after the move to end AM/FM simulcasting (as detailed below), these newer stations were issued with only an FM license and had no AM frequency, precluding them from following other ILR licensees in splitting into younger FM/older AM services. These stations included Fox FM in Oxfordshire (15 Sept 1989), Lincs FM in Lincolnshire (1 March 1992), Pirate FM in Cornwall (3 April 1992), Minster FM in North Yorkshire (4 July 1992) and CFM in Cumbria (14 April 1993). These stations have now effectively been split in twain by Bauer to broadcast Greatest Hits Radio on their legacy FM frequencies, with a localised Hits Radio service offered alongside it on DAB; with the exception of Fox FM, which is now owned by Global and broadcasting as Heart.

=== Split services ===
In 1986 the Home Office sanctioned in principle the idea that different services could be broadcast on each station's FM and AM frequency and six experiments of split programming on Independent Local Radio of up to ten hours a week took place, although the first experimental part-time split service had taken place two years earlier when Radio Forth created Festival City Radio for the duration of the Edinburgh Festival. The first station to permanently split their frequencies was Guildford's County Sound who rebranded the FM output as Premier Radio and turned the AM output into a new golden oldies station, County Sound Gold in 1988.

By 1988, the government had decided that the practice of splitting was beneficial and a quick way to increase choice for listeners. The IBA then began encouraging ILR stations to split their services and most soon complied. The usual format was to have a "gold" (oldies) service on AM and pop music on FM, although Radio City tried "City Talk" on AM before abandoning the format and replacing it with a "gold" station. By the start of the 1990s, most stations had done 'the splits' with the final stations ending waveband simulcasting by the mid-1990s.

=== Incremental Radio ===
Incremental Radio was a new type of radio licence given out by the IBA between 1989 and 1990. These were additional radio services introduced into areas already served by an Independent Local Radio station and most had to offer output not already available on ILR, such as specialist music, programmes for a specific section of the community or for smaller areas than ILR stations cover. 22 stations went on air, most of which were eventually acquired by the large radio groups and absorbed into their networks. As of 2024 only a few remain independently owned and operated. The regulatory model these stations were under was a precursor to commercial radio stations licensed by the incoming Radio Authority.

== The Broadcasting Act 1990 ==
The Broadcasting Act 1990 provided for the abolition of the IBA and its replacement by the Independent Television Commission. The IBA continued to regulate radio under the new name of the Radio Authority, but with a different remit.

As a "light-touch" regulator (although heavier than the ITC), the Radio Authority was to issue licences to the highest bidder and promote the development of commercial radio choice.

=== INR, RSLs, SALLIES and IRR ===
This led to the awarding of three national contracts, known as Independent National Radio to Classic FM, Virgin 1215 (later Virgin Radio and then rebranded Absolute Radio) and Talk Radio (later Talksport).

The Radio Authority also began to license restricted service licence (RSL) stations – low-power temporary radio stations for special events, operating for up to 28 days a year – and to reduce the criteria for a "viable service area" with the introduction of Small Scale Local Licences (SALLIES) for villages, special interest groups and small communities.

By this time the medium wave band had become unpopular with radio groups and the majority of new stations were awarded an FM licence only, even when an AM licence was jointly available.

In 1994 the Radio Authority introduced regional stations (Independent Regional Radio, again usually grouped under the banner "ILR" by most commentators) and began to license the commercial Digital Audio Broadcasting (DAB) multiplexes in October 1998.

The Radio Authority was replaced by the Office of Communications (Ofcom) in 2004, which also replaced the ITC, the Broadcasting Standards Commission, the Radio Communications Agency and the Office of Telecommunications (Oftel). Ofcom has stated that they plan to continue the development of Independent Local Radio, with an emphasis on digital broadcasting, and to "ensure the character" of local stations, following the mergers and loss of local identities that followed the 1990 Act.

=== Reincarnation of former ILR station brands ===
Several brand names previously used by heritage ILR stations have since been revived for use by FM, digital and online stations, generally unconnected to the original licensees and separate from the stations which once bore those names.

Following the rebranding of Pennine Radio as The Pulse, the name Pennine FM was reused for a SALLIE local station in Huddersfield (previously branded as Huddersfield FM) from 2008 until the station's closure in 2010.

Herefordshire community radio station Youthcomm Radio was rebranded as Radio Wyvern in October 2022, marking the 40th anniversary of the original Radio Wyvern's launch; following this, Big City Radio in the Aston area of Birmingham gave up its FM frequencies to a revived BRMB on 4th September 2023, the Big City Radio name and format continuing on digital platforms thereafter.

Exmouth community station East Devon Radio was rebranded under the DevonAir Radio name in March 2023; this was the station's fourth branding since its 2006 launch, having previously been Bay FM and, between 2018 and 2021 ExmouthAiR; prior to adopting the DevonAir name for their main feed, EDR had launched an oldies service on digital platforms under the name 'DevonAir Gold' in 2022.

The name Radio Victory has been relaunched into Portsmouth twice; the first revival was for a local (SALLIE) FM service for the city in 1999, with this station latterly joining the cluster now broadcasting as Easy Radio South Coast; the second and current incarnation launched on smallscale DAB on 1 April 2022.

== ILR stations ==
In 2005, there were 217 licensed analogue ILR and IRR services in England; 16 in Wales; 34 in Scotland; eight in Northern Ireland; and two in the Channel Islands. These are licences rather than franchises. Some licences are grouped nationally, regionally or by format to provide one service; other licences cover two or more services.

There were three national analogue services. There was one national DAB multiplex (Digital One) and 47 regional DAB multiplexes, owned by 10 and operated by nine companies (each multiplex carrying multiple services).

=== Manx Radio ===
The first licensed commercial radio station in the United Kingdom is often stated to be Manx Radio, which launched in June 1964. However, since the Isle of Man is not part of the United Kingdom, Manx Radio is not considered to be an ILR station and launched with a Post Office licence. Manx Radio is funded by a mixture of commercial advertising and a yearly £860,000 Manx Government subvention.

== See also ==
- List of radio stations in the United Kingdom
