= Heart Dunstable =

Coordinates: 51.8903°N 0.5298°W

Dunstable; Aylesbury; Berkhamsted (new Complex); Leighton Buzzard; England
- Broadcast area: Bedfordshire, Hertfordshire and Buckinghamshire
- Frequency: FM: 97.6 MHz
- RDS: Heart

Programming
- Format: Hot AC

History
- First air date: 15 October 1981 (as Chiltern Radio)
- Last air date: 16 July 2010

Heart Dunstable (formerly 97.6 Chiltern FM) was an Independent Local Radio station based in Chiltern Road in Dunstable, Bedfordshire.

== History ==
Together with sister stations 96.9 Chiltern FM, Northants 96 and Horizon Radio, the station formed the Chiltern Radio Network, which became the Chiltern Radio Group. The Chiltern Radio Group underwent a number of ownership changes as Britain's radio ownership rules were liberalised, first becoming part of the GWR Group's Mix Network in September 1995, during which time networked programming from the group's headquarters in Bristol was introduced to off-peak hours (after 7pm).

When GWR merged with Capital Radio in May 2005 to form GCap Media, the combined group's local FM network, including Chiltern, was renamed the One Network for advertising clients, though the station was still called Chiltern on air (even returning to the heritage branding Chiltern Radio for a time). GCap was itself bought out by Global Radio in 2008, with the new owners planning to operate many of their new acquisitions under Global's existing Heart and Galaxy brands. As a result, in January 2009, Chiltern Radio was rebranded by its owners Global Radio as Heart, this move ended, after 28 years, the use of the Chiltern Radio brand name.

== Network restructuring ==
On 21 June 2010, Global Radio announced plans to close Heart Dunstable and merge the station with Heart Milton Keynes, Heart Northants and Heart Bedford as part of plans to reduce the Heart network of stations from 33 to 16. The new station, Heart Home Counties, began broadcasting from Dunstable on 16 July 2010.

== Notable past presenters ==
Past presenters included Mark Smith, Philippa Collins, Conrad Alexander, Paul McKenna, Graham Torrington, Dale Winton, NJ Williams, Martin Collins, Jeremy Beadle and Chris Moyles.
