= Timeline of radio in Wales =

This is a timeline of the development of radio in Wales.

== 1970s ==
- 1972
  - 12 July – Following the enabling of The Sound Broadcasting Act 1972, The Independent Broadcasting Authority is formed, paving the way for the launch of Independent Local Radio.
- 1974
  - 30 September – Swansea Sound, the first Independent Local Radio station in Wales, begins broadcasting to the Swansea area.
- 1977
  - 3 January – BBC Radio Cymru is launched.
- 1978
  - Autumn – Four experimental local radio stations broadcast in Wales for a single week: Radio Deeside, Radio Merthyr, Radio Rhondda and Radio Wrexham
  - 13 November – Due to Radio 4's forthcoming transfer from medium wave to long wave, BBC Radio Wales launches as a full-time station on Radio 4's former Welsh medium wave opt-out wavelength of 340m (882 kHz), albeit initially with very limited broadcast hours due to very limited coverage of BBC Radio 4 on FM in Wales.
  - 23 November – All BBC national radio stations change their medium or long wave transmission wavelength as part of a plan for BBC AM broadcasting in order to improve national AM reception, and to conform with the Geneva Frequency Plan of 1975. Radio 1's transmission wavelength is moved from 247m (1214 kHz) to 275 & 285m (1053 & 1089 kHz) medium wave. Radio 2's wavelength is moved from 1500m (200 kHz) long wave to 433 & 330m (693 & 909 kHz) medium wave. Radio 3 is moved from 464m (647 kHz) to 247m (1215 kHz) medium wave. Radio 4 is moved from various medium wavelengths to 1500m (200 kHz) long wave.
- 1979
  - November – A weekday mid-morning programme launches on BBC Radio Cymru, thereby extending its broadcasting hours to 65 hours each week. Previously, apart from extended news bulletins at lunchtime and early evening, and some off-peak opt-outs, the station had only been on air at breakfast time.

== 1980s ==
- 1980
  - February – BBC Radio Deeside is launched as an opt-out service from BBC Radio Wales.
  - 11 April – CBC in Cardiff becomes the first of the second tranche of Independent Local Radio stations to start broadcasting. It is the first new ILR station since 1976.
- 1981
  - October – BBC Radio Deeside is expanded to cover all of north east Wales and is renamed BBC Radio Clwyd.
- 1983
  - 18 April – BBC Radio Gwent launches as an opt-out service from BBC Radio Wales.
  - 13 June – Gwent Broadcasting becomes the first station in the UK to occupy the newly released 102.2 to 104.5Mhz part of the VHF/FM waveband.
- 1985
- 24 April – Financial difficulties force South Wales station Gwent Broadcasting to close down after less than two years on air. Its frequencies were later given over to a sustaining service provided by neighbouring station CBC in Cardiff, with which it was trying to merge.
  - 14 October – At 6am, CBC is relaunched as Red Dragon Radio and broadcasts a 24-hour schedule - CBC had previously closed down between 1am and 6am. The station also covers the Newport area, offering a replacement service to Gwent Broadcasting, and provides separate breakfast shows for Cardiff and Newport until the early 1990s.
- 1986
  - The Home Office sanctions six experiments of split programming on Independent Local Radio. Up to ten hours a week of split programming is allowed. Marcher Sound is one of the stations to take advantage of this so that it can provide some programming in Welsh.
- 1988
  - 29 September – BBC Radio 1 starts broadcasting on FM in South Wales.
- 1989
  - 31 March – Marcher Gold begins broadcasting on MW to Wrexham and Chester and the area's FM station is renamed MFM.
  - 19 December – BBC Radio 1 starts transmitting on FM in the Cardigan Bay area.

== 1990s ==
- 1990
  - 15 July – Touch AM begins broadcasting in South Wales with the area's FM station being renamed Red Dragon FM.
- 1991
  - March – BBC Radio Gwent stops broadcasting.
- 1992
  - 14 December – Radio Ceredigion begins broadcasting to Aberystwyth and the West Wales Coast.
- 1993
  - 1 July – Radio Maldwyn begins broadcasting on AM to the Montgomeryshire area of Wales.
  - 27 August – Marcher Coast begins broadcasting. The station covers the north Wales coastal area from Llandudno eastwards.
  - October – BBC Radio Clwyd closes, although news opt-outs continue until 2002.
- 1994
  - 4 September – Galaxy 101 launches a dance music service to the Severn estuary area.
- 1995
  - 30 September – Swansea Sound's FM frequency becomes a CHR (contemporary hit radio) station called 96.4 Sound Wave, while Swansea Sound continues to broadcast its full service format on 1170 AM.
- 1996
  - 23 November – Valleys Radio begins broadcasting on MW to the South Wales valleys.
- 1998
  - 11 December – Champion FM begins broadcasting to Caernarfon and Anglesey.
- 1999
  - The BBC begins creating an FM network for BBC Radio Wales. Previously, apart from in Gwent, the station had only been available on MW.
  - 19 August – BBC Radio 1 broadcasts its first split programming when it introduces weekly national new music shows for Scotland, Wales and Northern Ireland. The Session in Wales is presented by Bethan Elfyn and Huw Stephens.

== 2000s ==
- 2000
  - 1 May – 106.3 Bridge FM begins broadcasting to the Bridgend area of South Wales.
  - 3 October – South Wales regional station Real Radio Wales begins broadcasting.
- 2001
  - 31 July – The regional multiplex covering south Wales, MXR Severn Estuary, begins transmissions.
- 2002
  - 24 May – Wales gets its first community radio station when GTFM begins broadcasting to Pontypridd and surrounding areas. The station is one of 15 trial stations participating in the under an Access Radio experiment and following full evaluation, GTFM was licensed as the first community radio station in Wales under OFCOM's changed rules in 2006
  - 14 July – 102.5 Radio Pembrokeshire begins broadcasting.
  - BBC Radio Wales' news bulletins in north east Wales end.
  - Galaxy 101 is rebranded as Vibe 101.
- 2003
  - 3 January – Severn Estuary regional station Galaxy 101 is renamed Vibe 101.
- 2004
  - 30 January – The Swansea SW Wales (DAB Multiplex) begins broadcasting..
  - 13 June – 97.1 Radio Carmarthenshire begins broadcasting.
  - 14 July – 97.5 Scarlet FM begins broadcasting to the Llanelli area.
- 2006
  - 6 September – Vibe 101 is rebranded as Kiss 101.
- 2007
  - 8 October – Radio Cardiff begins broadcasting.
  - 29 November – Nation Radio Wales begins broadcasting.
  - 14 December – Sunshine Radio begins broadcasting to Herefordshire and Monmouthshire.
- 2008
  - 16 June – Nation Radio Wales begins broadcasting on FM across South Wales. It replaces Xfm South Wales. It gets the berth following the sale of Xfm South Wales to Town and Country (now Nation Broadcasting) on 30 May 2008.
- 2009
  - March – Following Global Radio's takeover of GCap Media, Champion 103 is rebranded as Heart Cymru as part of a rollout of the Heart network across 29 local radio stations owned by Global. By this point, local programming is now reduced to ten hours on weekdays and seven hours at weekends.
  - 30 April – Valleys Radio closes after thirteen years on air.

== 2010s ==
- 2010
  - 2 July – Heart North Wales and West replaces Heart North Wales Coast, Heart Cheshire and North East Wales and Heart Wirral.
  - 25 December – Radio Hafren launches as a replacement for Radio Maldwyn.
- 2011
  - 3 January – Red Dragon FM is relaunched as Capital South Wales as part of a merger of owners Global's Hit Music and Galaxy networks to form the Capital FM network.
- 2012
  - 1 June – Swansea's 102.1 Bay Radio is relaunched as Nation 80s, becoming the first FM station in the UK to play nothing but 80s music.
- 2013
  - 21 January – Radio Today reports the name change of Nation 80s to Nation Hits, a move allowing the station to air a broader range of music. It is the station's third rebranding since 2009.
  - 29 July – The regional multiplex covering south Wales, MXR Severn Estuary, closes.
  - Nation Radio Wales increases its coverage area across Wales via DAB when it began broadcasting to north-east Wales and parts of Cheshire and Merseyside in March, via MuxCo's Wrexham, Chester and Liverpool multiplex. and in August, the station launches on DAB in Pembrokeshire and Carmarthenshire via the Muxco Mid and West Wales multiplex.
- 2014
  - 6 May –
    - Real Radio is rebranded as Heart.
    - Following the launch of Heart North Wales, Capital North West and Wales replaces the former Heart station Heart North Wales & West and Heart Cymru is relaunched as Capital Cymru.
  - 12 July – Anglesey gets its first full time station when bilingual community radio station Môn FM begins broadcasting.
- 2015
  - 11 February – Radio Hafren closes after 22 years on air.
- 2016
  - 29 February – The UK's second national commercial multiplex starts broadcasting. However, only 73% of the UK's population is able to receive it.
  - 19 September – BBC Cymru launches a pop-up radio station, Radio Cymru Mwy (Radio Cymru More), broadcasting for three months in the run-up to BBC Radio Cymru's 40th anniversary. Consisting of five hours of music-led entertainment programming each weekday, Radio Cymru Mwy is available on DAB in south east Wales and online.
- 2017
  - July - Point FM ceases broadcasting a winding-up order in the High Court for failing to pay royalties.
  - 19 September – Nation Radio Wales begins broadcasting on FM in Carmarthenshire (102.9 FM) and Pembrokeshire (107.1 FM)
- 2018
  - 29 January – BBC Radio Cymru 2 begins broadcasting at 6.30am on 29 January 2018. It airs as an opt-out service from 7-9am on Mondays – Saturdays and from 7-10 am on Sundays.
  - 15 May – Sound Digital announces that it will add 19 transmitters to its network, including in parts of Wales.
  - 24 October – BBC Radio Wales' FM coverage in North East and Mid Wales by taking over 32 transmitters previously used by BBC Radio 3. The changeover allowed an estimated 400,000 listeners to receive Radio Wales on FM, extending its reach to a potential 91% of households in Wales.
- 2019
  - 31 May – Capital Cymru drops most of its networked programming and introduces a full schedule of local output, including an additional Welsh-language daytime show. The station retains both the Capital branding and much of the network's Contemporary hit radio music playlist.
  - 31 May – Radio Ceredigion ceases broadcasting after its owners, Nation Broadcasting, decided to close the station and replace it with a relay of Nation Radio Wales.

== 2020s ==
- 2020
  - September – Swansea Sound joins the Greatest Hits Radio network and is rebranded as Greatest Hits Radio South Wales. Most of the station's local output - including Breakfast, daytime and Welsh language shows - was retained due to conditions placed on the station's AM broadcast licence by OFCOM.
  - October - Tudno FM ceases broadcasting due to financial and operational problems compounded by the COVID-19 pandemic.
  - 16 October – Global switches off its mediumwave frequencies in Cardiff and Newport The frequencies had most recently been used to relay Smooth Radio.
- 2021
  - 20 January - Calon FM ceases broadcasting after Glyndwr University withdraws its support - a decision criticised by the station's own volunteers.
  - May – Môn FM's broadcast area expands when two new transmitters are switched on. They cover Penmynydd, which covers eastern Anglesey and north Gwynedd, and Nebo, near Amlwch, serving north Anglesey. The station began broadcasting on 96.8 FM from the Penmynydd transmitter, targeting eastern Anglesey and north Gwynedd, on 6 May 2021.
  - 11 October - Calon FM resumes broadcasting after the station's licence is transferred to a new company run by its volunteers.
- 2022
  - 21 April – Nation Broadcasting launches Breezy Radio, replacing Swansea Bay Radio on 102.1FM in Swansea. The new station is available throughout Wales on DAB.
  - 1 September – Easy Radio replaces Breezy Radio.
  - 27 October – The local DAB multiplex covering Cardiff launches.
  - 4 November – The small-scale DAB multiplex covering Cardiff begins broadcasting.
- 2023
  - April – Bauer removes almost all of its local programming from Greatest Hits Radio South Wales. Bauer management told the industry news website, RadioToday, that the separate content was no longer viable going forwards. The station retains its late-night Welsh-language programme until November.
  - 11 November – The local DAB multiplex covering Wrexham launches.
- 2024
  - 4 March – BBC Radio Cymru 2's hours expand after Ofcom gave approval for Radio Cymru 2 to become a fully fledged radio station. The station's hours increase from four to nine hours on Mondays to Thursdays, four to six hours on Fridays and from three to 14 hours on Sundays.
  - April – The Wave 96.4 FM will be rebranded as Hits Radio South West Wales as part of a network-wide relaunch of 15 local radio stations in England and Wales which will see them losing the heritage names in favour of Hits Radio branding. Local content, consisting of the weekday breakfast show plus news, travel information and commercials, will continue as before.
  - 24 October – The two local DAB multiplexes covering North and South Pembrokeshire launch.
- 2025
  - 21 February - All local programming on Capital Cymru, Capital North West and North Wales and Heart North and Mid Wales ends with the closure of the Gwersyllt studios and the loss of 12 jobs. Local news and traffic bulletins are retained
  - 24 February - Drivetime shows on Heart South Wales and Capital South Wales begin airing in North Wales.
  - 12 March – The local DAB multiplex covering Wrexham launches.
  - March - Calon FM ceases broadcasting for a second time and hands over its FM licence to digital station Premier Radio.
  - 6 June - Hits Radio South Wales ends its local breakfast show.

== See also ==
- Timeline of radio in London
- Timeline of radio in Manchester
- Timeline of radio in Northern Ireland
- Timeline of radio in Scotland
