= Radio in Wales =

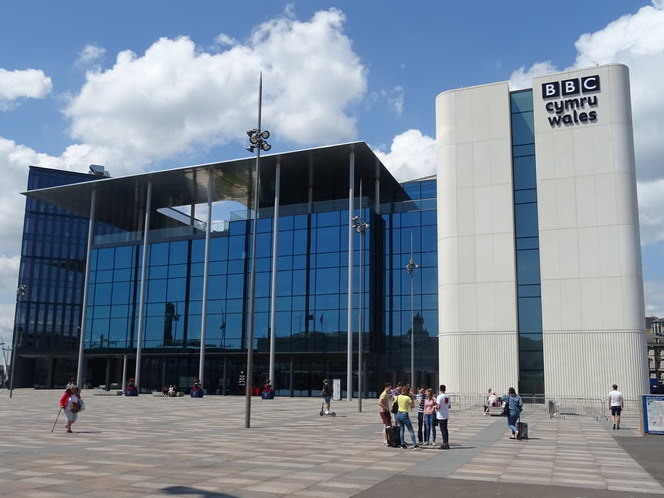
BBC Cymru Wales New Broadcasting House

Radio broadcasting in Wales began in 1923 with the inauguration of the British Broadcasting Corporation's (BBC) station at Cardiff. Radio broadcasting has been a prime source of news and entertainment for the population of Wales since that date. As well as the public service provided by the BBC, Wales has private regional and national services producing programmes in both the Welsh and English languages; though the provision of Welsh language radio has been historically inconsistent and politically divisive.

== Early history ==
=== 1922–1928 ===
Before broadcast radio stations, radios were used primarily as a means of military and civil communications, with no intent as a medium for sharing information or entertaining the masses. In 1922 under rules set out by the General Post Office (GPO) the British Broadcasting Company (BBC) was formed and began broadcasting in December of that year. Public broadcasting began in Wales the next year with the inauguration of the BBC's Cardiff station (5WA) on 13 February. The Cardiff station was located at 19 Castle Street with its transmitter at the Castle Avenue Electricity works. Listeners tuned in at 5pm to hear the station's first broadcast, and at 9:30pm heard Welsh baritone Mostyn Thomas sing Dafydd y Garreg Wen the first Welsh song to be performed on radio in Wales. It took until 1 March, St David's Day, for the station to broadcast a talk in Welsh.

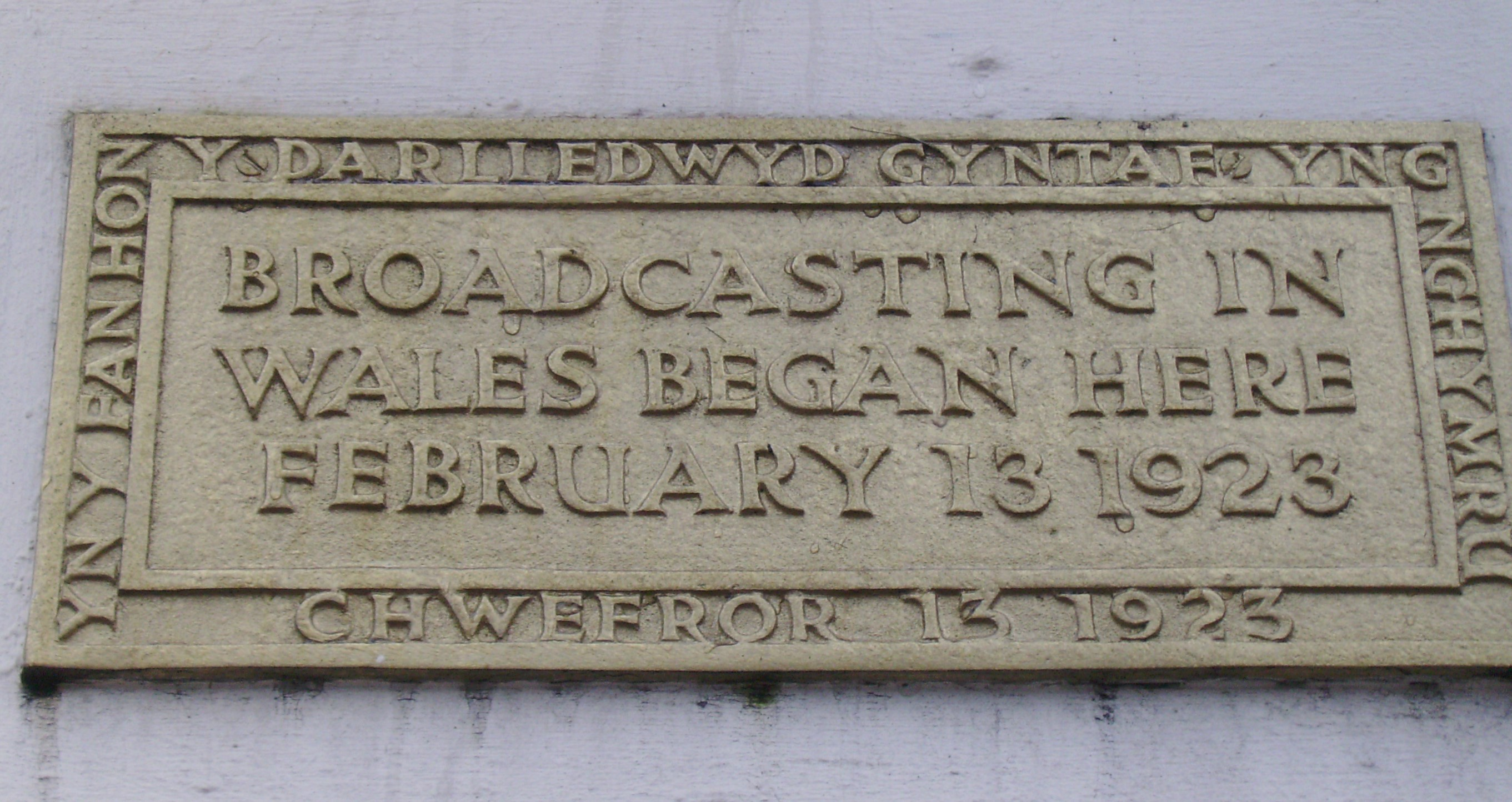
The Commemorative plaque at 19 Castle Street, Cardiff

The opening of the Cardiff station was quickly followed by the creation of a relay station at Swansea (5SX), which began output on 12 December 1924. Initially everything broadcast from Cardiff was produced by the station, but following the introduction of simultaneous transmission in 1924 roughly 75% of Cardiff's output, and an even larger proportion of Swansea's came from London.

By the end of the decade about 70% of the population of Wales were able to receive broadcasts from the BBC, which renamed itself the British Broadcasting Corporation in 1927. Though it was not until 1935 that the percentage of Welsh households were paying the licence fee. This was primarily due to many people at the time in Wales listening to a wireless in public halls. Despite the large listenership, very few programmes were aired in the Welsh language during these early years. The station producing the most substantial amount of Welsh language programmes at the time was Radio Éireann located in Dublin, who understood that their broadcasts could be picked up by the Welsh speaking communities of west Wales. The lack of regional or national programming was a decision made by the BBC's Director-General, John Reith and his senior staff, who felt that the 'best' programmes were made from London and the rest of the country imitate their style and content. Despite this, efforts were made within Wales to ensure the Welsh language was part of the Radio schedule. Pressure group Cylch Dewi (formed by a group of cultural nationalists who counted Saunders Lewis as one of its members) produced their own output to be aired, including the first Welsh-language religious service.

One of the most damning responses to the lack of Welsh-language radio provision came from a 1927 report commissioned by the President of the Welsh Board of Education. In the report the BBC was accused of: "...achieving the complete Anglicisation of the intellectual life of the nation. We regard the current policy of the British Broadcasting Corporation as one of the most serious menaces to the life of the Welsh language."

=== 1929–1939 ===
In February 1929 it was decided that Cardiff should become the main station for the BBC's West Region, which consisted of Wales and South West England. Despite Cardiff's central role as provider, the main transmitter was based in Washford in Somerset and most of north and mid-Wales were unable to receive the signal. In addition, simultaneous broadcast meant that only a small proportion of programmes were made by the station. The biggest impact of the decision to merge Wales with the South West was cultural. With two very different communities to provide for, Welsh language was virtually non-existent on the airwaves, which was much to the satisfaction of the West Region director, E. R. Appleton. Appleton was a staunch believer in spoken broadcasting being in the English-language only, and stated repeatedly, that as the Government had decided to form a corporation for the function of broadcasting, it was natural that the official language of the United Kingdom be used throughout. (Note: Although Appleton believed spoken broadcast should be in the English language only, he had no issue with songs in Welsh, as he equated it to listening to music in other languages, such as Italian opera.)

In the history BBC broadcasting in Wales, the importance of the victory won in sound radio can scarcely be exaggerated. All the subsequent recognition of Wales in the field of broadcasting (and, it could be argued, in other fields too) stemmed from that victory.

— John Davies gives his thoughts on the creation of the Welsh Region. Broadcasting and the BBC in Wales (1994)

The lack of Welsh-language broadcasting saw an alliance of organisations who waged a campaign to amend the situation. The University of Wales sent a deputation to London to argue for greater recognition of the nation in late 1928, but by the mid 1930s they were joined by the National Union of Welsh Societies, the Welsh Parliamentary Party and Plaid Genedlaethol Cymru in pressuring the BBC. The argument put forward by the BBC was that a lack of wavelengths made it technically impossible to separate the West and Wales. This argument was demolished by 19 year-old physicist Edward George Bowen and the resulting pressure resulted in a studio being established in north Wales at Bangor in 1935. In addition a transmitter was erected in Llangoed and Wales was given its first Welsh Regional Director, Rhys Hopkin Morris. Finally, in July 1937, Wales was allocated its own wavelength and broadcast its first program on 4 July. Historian John Davies argued that the establishment of the Welsh Region was an important concession to nationalist sentiment.

By the late 1930s the BBC had increased its staff in Wales, and a pool of bilingual Welsh writers, broadcasters and producers were brought into the corporations to meet the demands of the new region. Seen as the best of Welsh-speaking intelligentsia, they included poet Alun Llewellyn Williams, producer Sam Jones and historian Geraint Dyfnallt Owen. Although the team were joined by those who were not fluent in the language, such as Mai Jones and Philip Burton, the preponderance of Welsh-speaking producers caused resentment among the non-Welsh-speaking staff.

Of the programmes produced during this period, the creation of an all-Wales news is arguably the most important. Before this date there had never been a newspaper that covered the entire country, just regional copies. The fact that all corners of the country could now hear the same report was an innovation for Wales. These broadcasts also brought into existence a standard form of spoken Welsh.

=== 1939–1952 – Golden age of Welsh Radio ===
In 1939, after war was declared, the BBC was forced to transmit a unified service across the United Kingdom; due partly to release wavelengths for military use, partly from the fear of the enemy using wireless beams as a point of target, but mostly to create a unified centralization required during states of war. Despite this fact there was still some Welsh-language output, transmitted to all of the United Kingdom, including a daily news bulletin at 5pm. There were murmurs of disapproval in England to being forced to listen to Welsh broadcasts, but some productions made by the Welsh Region proved very popular, including Mai Jones' Welsh Rarebit. Another consequence of the war for Welsh radio was the relocation of much of the BBCs department to the Bangor Studio, due to the risks of air raids on the cities of London and Bristol. This decision saw some of the biggest names in British entertainment arriving in north Wales, including Tommy Handley, Arthur Askey and Charlie Chester. The most successful show produced at Bangor during this period was Handley's It's That Man Again, which became the best-loved of all wartime programmes in Britain.

In 1945 Hopkin Morris resigned from the BBC to re-enter the field of politics. Alun Oldfield-Davies became the acting director until he was confirmed permanently for the post on 15 June 1945. On the 29 July 1945 the BBC's Welsh Home Service was launched, which was proceeded two days earlier by the first Welsh edition of the Radio Times. Oldfield-Davies initially pushed for more Welsh language programming, in an attempt to 'recover ground lost during the war'. Despite his actions he was also keen to not have the service too closely associated with the Welsh language, and attempted, unsuccessfully, to have the Welsh Home Service named as the Wales Home Service.

In 1946, with most of the former staff now released from war-time commitments, output increased. The news unit returned from London to Wales on 22 January, and several new posts were filled.

=== 1952–present era ===
==== Public service radio broadcasting ====
The BBC runs two national radio stations, BBC Radio Wales in English and BBC Radio Cymru in Welsh. There are also a number of local and regional commercial and community radio stations throughout the country which broadcast in both Welsh and English.

Contention has existed regarding Welsh provision on the two most popular stations in Wales, BBC Radio 2 and BBC Radio 1. Politicians in Wales have pushed to have 'opt-outs' in between broadcasts which bring listeners locally relevant news and weather, as is done on national television channels like BBC One. The Corporation's response to Welsh Government indicated however that such opt-outs would be technically impossible, due to the location of transmitters often close to the English border, and FM technology limitations. The prospect of a digital switchover will however alter this landscape.

==== Commercial radio broadcasting ====
Ofcom statistics show that Welsh commercial local radio has higher listening hours than the UK average.

In 2019, UK radio conglomerate Global Plc cut a significant amount of its local programing across the UK, specifically stations branded as Capital, Smooth, and Heart, as well as those produced under license for Communicorp (owner of the Capital South Wales brand). Communicorp acquired the stations after the Competition Commission ordered the sale of services in Cardiff and North/Mid Wales in 2013.

As a result, most programming on five of the top ten Welsh radio stations is now produced in London, with the exception of Capital Cymru who increased local programming in order to meet their Welsh language obligations in the Gwynedd and Anglesey region.

Of the three conglomerates who own stations in Wales, only Nation Broadcasting are headquartered in Wales (based at St Hilary).

Name of conglomerate	Number of stations owned
Nation Broadcasting	7
Communicorp	2 (with 4 regional outputs)
Bauer Media Group	2

The industry monitor Rajar has recorded a subsequent fall in listenership of these deregulated stations, and an increase in listenership for Capital's commercial competitors, including Nation Radio and Dragon Radio Wales.

Welsh radio station reach, and change quarter on quarter
Rank	Radio station	Broadcast office location	Weekly reach (Q2 2019)	Reach change (Q2 on Q1 2019)
1	Heart South Wales	London / Cardiff	394,000	
2	BBC Radio Wales	New Broadcasting House, Cardiff	365,000	
3	Capital South Wales	London / Cardiff	231,000	
4	Nation Radio	St Hilary	145,000	
5	Capital North West and Wales	London / Wrexham	140,000	
6	Hits Radio South Wales	Manchester / Swansea	115,000	
7	BBC Radio Cymru	New Broadcasting House, Cardiff / Bangor / Aberystwyth / Carmarthen	112,000	
8	Heart North Wales	London / Wrexham	108,000	
9	Smooth South Wales	London / Cardiff	81,000	
10	Smooth North Wales	London / Cardiff	67,000	
11	Dragon Radio Wales	St Hilary	49,000	
13	Greatest Hits Radio South Wales	London / Swansea	40,000	
14	Radio Pembrokeshire	St Hilary	35,000	
15	Radio Carmarthenshire	St Hilary	30,000	No change
16	Bridge FM	St Hilary	22,000	
17	Swansea Bay Radio	St Hilary	21,000	
18	Nation Radio (formerly Radio Ceredigion, which ceased broadcasting March 2019)	St Hilary	14,000	

Listener hours of Welsh national and local commercial radio stations
Rank	Station
1	Swansea Sound
2	Heart South Wales
3	Bridge FM
4	Radio Carmarthenshire
5	Heart North Wales
6	Capital North West & Wales
7	Capital South Wales
8	Dragon Radio
9	Radio Pembrokeshire
10	Radio Ceredigion (ceased broadcasting March 2019)
11	The Wave
12	Swansea Bay Radio
13	Nation Radio (South Wales)

==== Community radio ====
Wales continues to have a number of operating community radio stations across both FM, university campuses, and online.

Ofcom registered stations

- BGFM (Blaenau Gwent)
- Bro Radio (Vale of Glamorgan)
- GTFM (Pontypridd and Rhondda Cynon Taf)
- Premier Radio (Wrexham)
- Môn FM (Anglesey and North Gwynedd)
- Newport City Radio (Newport)
- Radio Cardiff (Cardiff)
- SA Radio Live (Lliw Valley)
- Sound Radio (Vale of Clwyd)
- Drift Radio (Rhyl)

University radio stations

- Xpress Radio (Cardiff)
- Storm FM (Bangor)
- Xtreme Radio (Swansea)
- Bay Radio (Aberystwyth)

Online only radio

- Radio Beca (entirely Welsh language) (Dyfed)
- Ceredigion FM (Ceredigion)
- Heat Radio (Swansea)
- Gwent Radio (Newport)
- Glam Radio (Across South Wales)
- South Wales ONE (Across South Wales)

== Footnotes ==
=== Primary sources ===
- Davies, John (1994). Broadcasting and the BBC in Wales. Cardiff: University of Wales Press. ISBN 0-7083-1273-X.
- Davies, John; Jenkins, Nigel; Menna, Baines; Lynch, Peredur I., eds. (2008). The Welsh Academy Encyclopaedia of Wales. Cardiff: University of Wales Press. ISBN 978-0-7083-1953-6.
- Hajkowski, Thomas (2013). "The coming of BBC Wales". The BBC and National Identity in Britain, 1922-53. Manchester: Manchester University Press. ISBN 9781847797414.
- Medhurst, Jamie (2010). A History of Independent Television in Wales. Cardiff: University of Wales Press. ISBN 978-0-7083-2308-3.
- Stephens, Meic, ed. (1979). The Arts in Wales 1950-1975. Cardiff: Welsh Arts Council. ISBN 0-905171-43-8.
- Morgan, Kenneth O. (2002). A Rebirth of a Nation. Oxford: Oxford University Press. ISBN 0-19-821760-9.
