= Heart 107.3 =

Heart 107.3 may refer to:

- Heart North and Mid Wales in Prestatyn
- Heart South Wales in Bargoed
- Triple M Hobart in Tasmania
