= Ffestiniog transmitting station =

Welsh broadcasting and telecommunications facility

Ffestiniog
- Location within Gwynedd
- Tower height: 45 metres (148 ft)
- Coordinates: 52.934191°N 3.921521°W
- Grid reference: SH709391
- Built: 1969
- BBC region: BBC Wales (1967-1982)
- ITV region: ITV Cymru Wales

The Ffestiniog transmitting station is a broadcasting and telecommunications facility located on the slopes of Mynydd Maentwrog about 3 kilometres (1.9 mi) south of the town of Llan Ffestiniog, in Gwynedd, Wales. It was originally built by the IBA, entering service in early 1969 acting as a BBC and ITV relay transmitter for the now-defunct 405-line VHF television system.

== Specifications ==
The site has a self-standing 45 m (148 ft) lattice tower erected on land that is itself about 310 metres (1,020 ft) above sea level. The television broadcasts primarily cover the towns of Ffestiniog, Blaenau Ffestiniog and the Vale of Ffestiniog in general.

625-line colour TV came to the site in the late 1970s.

The 405-line VHF television service closed across the UK in 1985, but according to the BBC's and ITV's transmitter list and the BBC's internal "Eng. Inf." magazine, Ffestiniog's 405 line services were due to close early - in the third quarter of 1982.

Ffestiniog currently broadcasts digital television and analogue FM radio.

== Services listed by frequency ==
=== Analogue television ===
==== 28 February 1969 - Late 1970s ====
The start date is for ITV service from the site. It is not clear when the BBC service commenced. The transmitter was classed as a relay of Blaenplwyf about 40 miles (65 km) to the south (for BBC) and as a relay of Preseli about 120 kilometres (75 mi) to the south (for ITV). However, the line-of-sight to Preseli is obstructed about 6 miles (10 km) to the south of Ffestiniog, and it is likely that the signal feed was obtained by off-air reception of Arfon about 25 kilometres (16 mi) to the west, itself a repeater of Preseli.

Frequency	VHF	kW	Service
66.75 MHz	5H	0.05	BBC1 Wales
214.75 MHz	13V	0.1	HTV Wales

==== Late 1970s - Third Quarter 1982 ====
Colour TV eventually arrived, with the site now additionally acting as a very indirect relay of Llanddona (about 30 kilometres (19 mi) to the north) for the 625-line services, receiving its signal off-air from Llandecwyn, itself receiving a signal off-air from Arfon, which received its signal off-air from Llanddona itself.

Frequency	VHF	UHF	kW	Service
66.75 MHz	5H	—	0.05	BBC1 Wales
214.75 MHz	13V	—	0.1	HTV Wales
479.25 MHz	—	22	1.2	BBC1 Wales
503.25 MHz	—	25	1.2	HTV Wales
527.25 MHz	—	28	1.2	BBC2 Wales

==== Third Quarter 1982 - 21 October 2009 ====
Channel 4 launched across the UK on 1 November 1982. Being in Wales, Ffestiniog broadcast the S4C variant. 405-line television was discontinued (after a mere 13 years) at about the same time as this new service started up. For the next 27 years there were to be no changes to the television output at this site.

Frequency	UHF	kW	Service
479.25 MHz	22	1.2	BBC1 Wales
503.25 MHz	25	1.2	HTV Wales
527.25 MHz	28	1.2	BBC2 Wales
559.25 MHz	32	1.2	S4C

=== Analogue and Digital Television ===
==== 21 October 2009 - 18 November 2009 ====
Digital switchover started at Llanddona and therefore at Ffestiniog and all its other relays. BBC 2 was closed down on channel 28 and ITV 1 was moved from channel 25 to channel 28 for its final three weeks of service. Mux A started up on the newly vacated channel 25 at full post-DSO power.

Frequency	UHF	kW	Service	System
479.25 MHz	22	1.2	BBC1 Wales	PAL System I
506.000 MHz	25	0.24	BBC A	DVB-T
527.25 MHz	28	1.2	itv1 wales	PAL System I
559.25 MHz	32	1.2	S4C	PAL System I

=== Digital Television ===
==== 18 November 2009- present ====
All the remaining analogue TV transmitters were shut down and the three multiplexes of Freeview Lite took over their frequencies, leaving channel 32 unused for now.

Frequency	UHF	kW	Service
482.000 MHz	22	0.24	Digital 3&4
506.000 MHz	25	0.24	BBC A
530.000 MHz	28	0.24	BBC B

=== Analogue radio (FM VHF) ===
==== 14 December 1992 - January 2012 ====
For its FM radio services, Ffestiniog acts as an off-air relay of Blaenplwyf.

Frequency	kW	Service
88.1 MHz	0.1	Radio 2
90.3 MHz	0.1	Radio 3
92.5 MHz	0.1	Radio Cymru
97.7 MHz	0.1	Radio 1
103.5 MHz	0.1	Radio 4

== See also ==
- List of masts
- List of radio stations in the United Kingdom
- List of tallest buildings and structures in Great Britain
