= Real Radio Digital =

Real Radio (Digital)
England
- Broadcast area: At time of closure: London; West Midlands; North West England national via Sky
- Frequency: DAB digital TV

Programming
- Format: Hot AC

Ownership
- Owner: GMG Radio

History
- First air date: 2004
- Last air date: 2014

Real Radio Digital was a DAB Digital Radio station operated by GMG Radio as part of their Real Radio network of stations. The station was designed to provide service over digital services in areas where Real was not available in a local form.

Real Radio Digital was primarily provided on the MXR regional digital multiplexes. It was not available on MXR Yorkshire (where Real Radio (Yorkshire) was carried instead) or on MXR South Wales & Severn (Real Radio (Wales)); the Switch Scotland (Central Scotland regional multiplex) carries Real Radio (Scotland).

Real Digital initially broadcast to the North West, North East, and West Midlands on the regional DAB multiplexes. It replaced a digital-only easy listening service named 'Smooth', which GMG had launched with the MXR multiplexes in 2001; the relaunch of 100.4 Jazz FM as Smooth FM in 2004 led to Real Radio Digital replace the digital Smooth service on MXR NW, and the following year's replacement of 102.2 Jazz FM, which broadcast on the other MXR multiplexes, with Smooth FM saw the Real digital service rolled out to the other areas without their own regional Real Radio service - the West Midlands and North East. (In Yorkshire and the Severn Estuary, where MXR already carried Real stations for Yorkshire and Wales, a feed from jazzfm.com took the vacated slot for a time.)

In 2007, GCap Media sold the Century Network of stations to GMG, which consisted of FM/DAB stations in the North East and North West and a digital-only Century broadcast in London, Cardiff and Birmingham. This move made Century and Real sister operations.

Century Digital was removed from DAB in Birmingham and Cardiff, with listeners in these areas advised by the Century Digital website to instead listen to Real on the regional multiplex. In March 2007, Century Digital ceased on DAB in London and was replaced by Real Digital.

The decision was taken to remove Real Digital from DAB in the North East and North West, in favour of continuing the local Century services (which were becoming more integrated into the Real network). In May 2008, Real Digital was removed from the North East to make way for Rock Radio. However, Real Digital ultimately remained available in the North West for a time.

In October 2008, the launch of the new version of Jazz FM (UK) saw GMG remove Real Digital from the North West, West Midlands and London multiplexes and instead use the space for Jazz FM. (A relay of London's 102.2 Smooth Radio was also removed from the MXR South Wales & Severn multiplex for Jazz FM). This in effect ended all DAB carriage of Real Digital.

In 2009, Century in the North West and North East was renamed Real Radio; this led to the Real name returning to DAB in these areas and the demise of the final use of the Century name.

== On Sky ==
Real Radio Digital was also available nationally within the radio section of Sky Digital. This continued as an automated music service for a time after Real Digital's closure, then subsequently became a relay of Real Radio (Wales).

The Sky relay of the Welsh station ceased on 22 April 2014, when, ahead of the relaunch of Real Radio stations as Heart services on 6 May, Real Radio Wales was withdrawn from satellite and replaced with The Arrow. (Heart is already provided on satellite by way of a relay of Heart London).
