= Heart 106.2 =

Heart 106.2 may refer to:

- Heart Yorkshire in Barnsley, Huddersfield Leeds, Doncaster and the surrounding areas
- Heart South Wales in Fishguard
- Heart London in London and the surrounding areas
