= Choral Evensong (BBC) =

Radio programme

- Other names: Choral Vespers
- Genre: Evensong service
- Running time: 60 minutes
- Country of origin: United Kingdom
- Language: English
- Home station: BBC Radio 4 (until 1970); BBC Radio 3 (1970–present)
- Original release: 7 October 1926
- Audio format: Stereophonic sound
- Website: Official website

Choral Evensong is the BBC's longest-running outside broadcast programme. It is a broadcast of the Anglican service of Choral Evensong (sung evening prayer) live from cathedrals, university college chapels and churches throughout the United Kingdom.

== Broadcasting ==
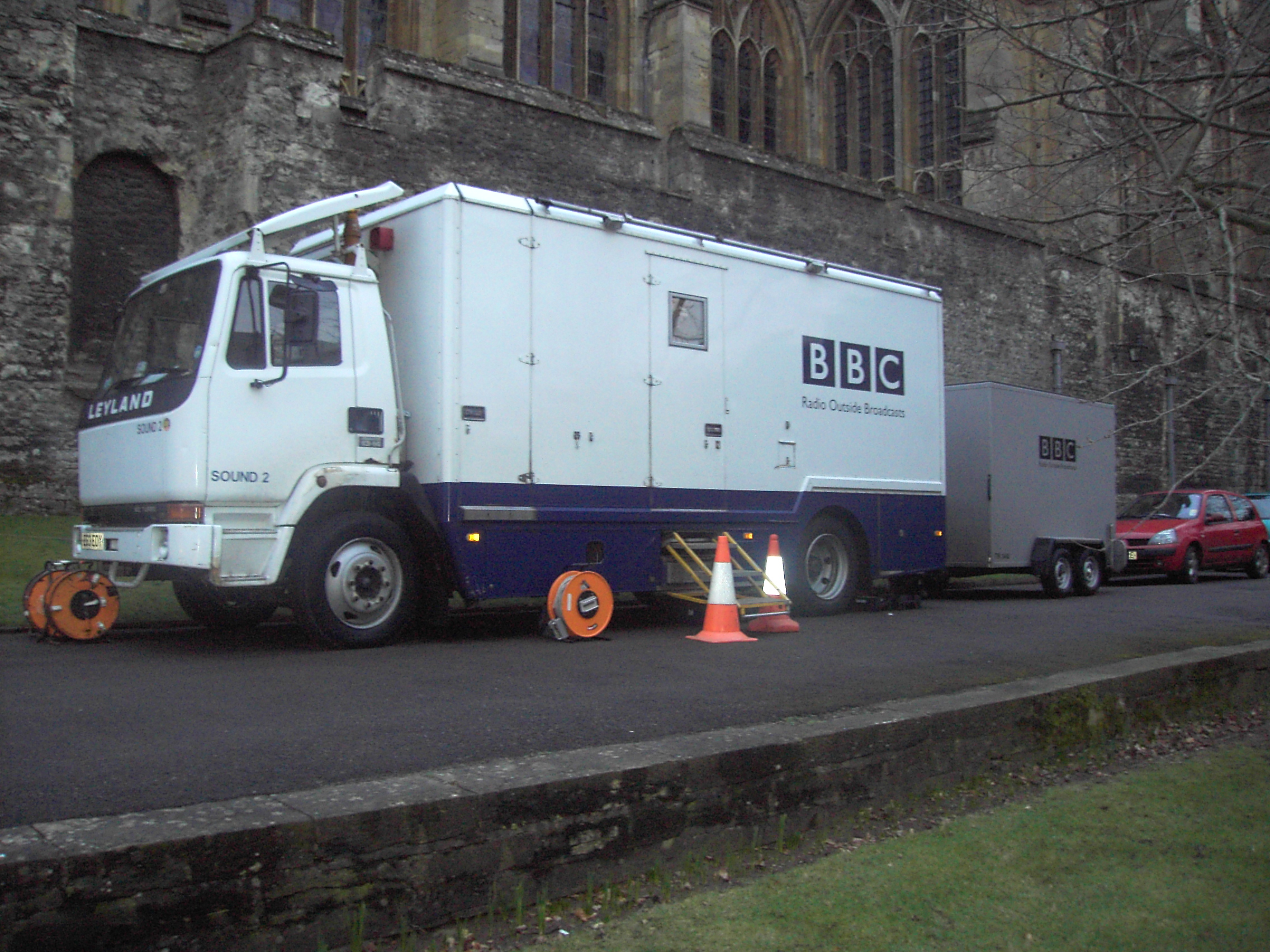
A BBC Radio Outside Broadcasts van at New College, Oxford in February 2006.

Choral Evensong is transmitted every Wednesday at 15:00 on BBC Radio 3, with a repeat on Sunday afternoons at 15:00. The most recent edition is available on BBC Sounds for one month following the original broadcast. There is also an archive available.

There are currently more than eighty venues on the rosta, ranging from Westminster Abbey, Oxbridge colleges and the famous cathedrals, but also including lesser known venues such as Bolton Parish Church. On occasion, Choral Vespers from Catholic cathedrals (such as Westminster Cathedral), Orthodox Vespers, or a recorded service from choral foundations abroad are broadcast, at which time it is referred to as Choral Vespers. Only about half of the broadcasts are now live, for cost reasons: the outside broadcasting team typically records a live service from one location and pre-records several others from the local area for later broadcasting.

== History ==
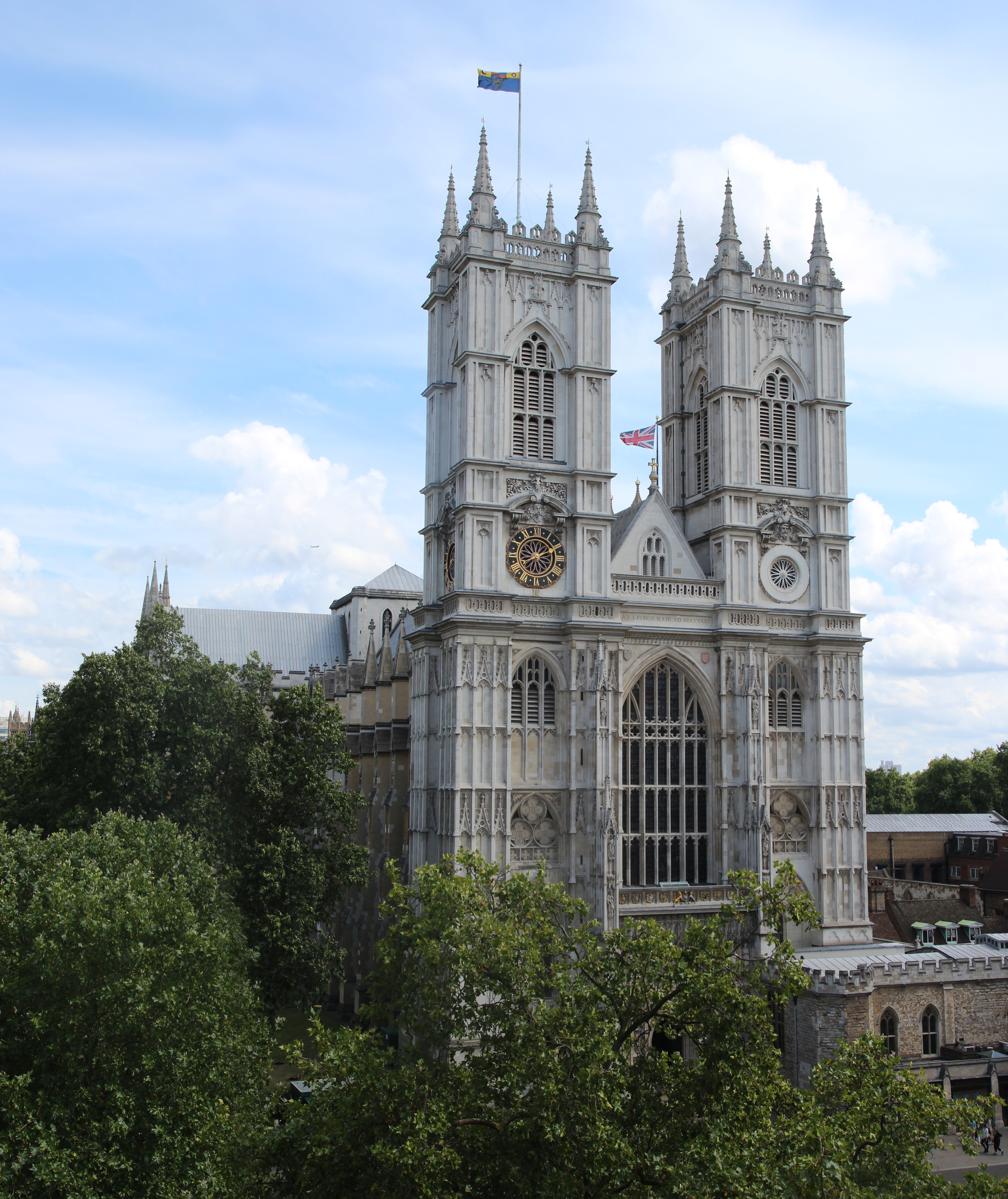
The first BBC broadcast of Choral Evensong came from Westminster Abbey in 1926

Regional radio stations began broadcasting ad-hoc evensongs from 1924: the earliest relay was from Llandaff Cathedral on Sunday 16 March 1924, and was broadcast on 5WA Cardiff, Wales’s first BBC radio station. These local broadcasts contined for the next two and a half years, with stations from Birmingham, Sheffield, Nottingham, Belfast, Newcastle and many others taking part.

The first national edition of Choral Evensong was relayed by the British Broadcasting Company from Westminster Abbey on 7 October 1926. For the first four years all the programmes came live from Westminster Abbey. York Minster joined the roster from 1931, and Norwich and Exeter cathedrals from 1933. After that more were added every year. But York withdrew from 1940 until 1949, following criticism by a BBC producer to Sir Edward Bairstow over the quality of his choir. From 1939 until 1942 the locations of wartime live broadcasts were not revealed due to security concerns.

Beginning on the National Programme, Choral Evensong was moved in the 1960s to the early evenings on the BBC Home Service and later to BBC Radio 4 until 8 April 1970, when it moved to BBC Radio 3. That year the programme was reduced to just one broadcast per month, but the BBC received 2,500 letters of complaint, and weekly transmissions were resumed on 1 July of that same year. There was a temporary return to Radio 4 in the late 1970s, then a permanent return to Radio 3 in 1981.

In 2007 the live broadcast was switched to Sundays, which again caused protests. The live transmission returned to Wednesdays in September 2008, with a recorded repeat on Sunday afternoons at approximately the same time. Choral Evensong forms part of Radio 3's religious programming remit, although non-religious listeners have also campaigned for its retention.

Its 80th, 90th and 100th anniversary programmes were celebrated live from Westminster Abbey, with services on 11 October 2006, 28 September 2016 and exactly 100 years to the date on 7 October 2026.

== Archives ==
As was common practice, the BBC did not preserve recordings of Choral Evensong before 1990. Colin Brownlee created the Archive of Recorded Church Music in the mid 2000s to collect recordings made over the years by members of the public. The earliest recording recovered so far (on 78rpm discs) comes from Derby Cathedral on 21 January 1947.
