= Heart 100.7 =

Heart 100.7 may refer to:

- Heart North East in Teesside and North Yorkshire
- Heart West Midlands in Birmingham and the West Midlands
