= Smooth Wales =

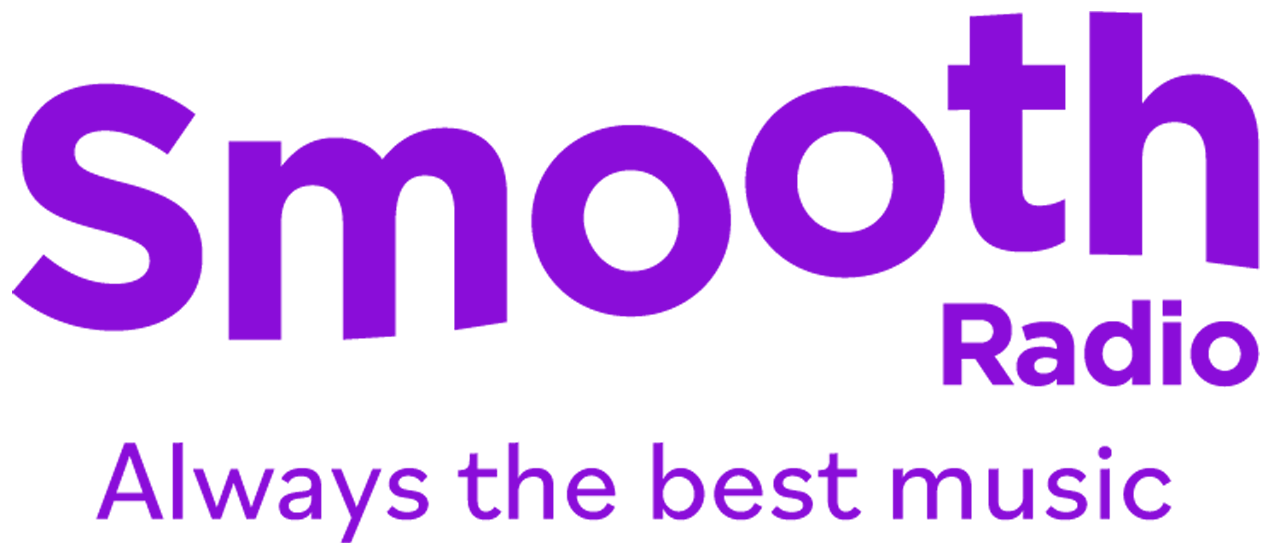
- Cardiff; United Kingdom
- Frequencies: DAB: 10D (North West Wales); DAB: 12C (Cardiff and Newport); DAB: 12D (North Wales)
- Branding: Always The Best Music across Wales

Programming
- Format: Soft Adult Contemporary
- Network: Smooth Radio

Ownership
- Owner: Global
- Sister stations: Capital North West and Wales, Capital South Wales, Heart North and Mid Wales & Heart South Wales

History
- First air date: 11 March 1980 (South Wales); 5 September 1983 (North Wales); 24 March 2014 (as Smooth)
- Former frequencies: AM: 1260 kHz (North Wales/Shropshire/Chester); AM: 1305 kHz (Newport); AM: 1359 kHz (Cardiff)

Links
- Website: Smooth North Wales & Cheshire; Smooth South Wales

Smooth Wales is an Independent Local Radio station broadcasting from Cardiff for South Wales and North Wales, as well as parts of Cheshire in England. All programming content is now shared to both areas. There are no longer any stations within the Smooth radio network broadcasting on AM, the last ever remaining one in North Wales and Cheshire closed at 1:00PM on Friday 28th February 2025. In later years, it was the only former regional Smooth AM station to have its own content, a local four-hour weekday show, as all other Smooth AM stations, as added to the network in 2014, carried the London network FM content, opting out only for local news and advertising breaks. The local show on Smooth Wales was carried over from the station's previous incarnation as Gold.

== History ==
=== Prior to 1999 ===
The two stations which latterly broadcast as Smooth in Wales were originally the AM frequencies of separate ILR stations in North and South Wales, although the former CBC/Red Dragon AM frequency has now been switched off. CBC launched to Cardiff in April 1980, and Marcher Sound broadcast to Wrexham and Deeside from September 1983. Both launched with FM and AM transmission. Initially, each station broadcast its own local programmes on both frequencies but, later, following the lead of Capital Radio in London and others, split their transmissions: CBC, which became Red Dragon in 1985, split off its AM frequencies as Touch Radio in 1990, and at around the same time Marcher Sound's AM franchise became Marcher Gold. The stations continued to exist as separate entities throughout this era.

=== 1999-2007: joining networks ===
Both Touch Radio and Marcher Gold would later go on to join network services after their parent stations were absorbed into larger entities. Capital Radio Group purchased Red Dragon and Touch Radio in 1999, and as a result the AM service joined the Capital Gold network, which was also being rolled out to other AM stations owned by the group. (Red Dragon on FM would retain its local programming and identity until becoming part of the Capital network in 2011.) Marcher Radio Group, meanwhile, was taken over by the GWR Group in 2000, and the Marcher Gold service on 1260 AM joined GWR's Classic Gold network, initially as 'Classic Gold Marcher' and latterly as 'Classic Gold 1260'. The Classic Gold station group was sold by GWR to UBC in 2002, though operationally little changed. On-air, the amount of local programming for Wales was reduced as the stations began to carry more of the networked programmes being broadcast from London (Capital Gold) and Dunstable (Classic Gold).

=== 2007-2014: Gold era ===
Following the merger of Capital Radio Group and GWR Group in 2005, forming GCap Media, ownership of Capital Gold stations, including that of the South Wales service, transferred to the new company. GCap then re-purchased the Classic Gold station network from UBC to regain control of the AM stations which had existed as sister stations to the ex-GWR FM stations, including the former Classic Gold Marcher.

On 3 August 2007, the Classic Gold and Capital Gold networks were combined into a single Gold network, broadcasting mostly from London, with four hours a day of local content to each station, broadcast between noon and 4pm, and this was generally voice-tracked rather than live. Both Gold services in Wales now received a single Gold programme for Wales in the slot, taking London content at other times.

Ofcom would later introduce content-sharing guidelines for AM stations, allowing all AM services to share programming with their sister services provided that at least ten hours a day of content came from within the nation (England, Scotland, Wales or Northern Ireland) to which the station was broadcast, although stations which had already been given permission to carry less than ten hours from their nation could retain their existing provision; this allowed Global Radio, who had purchased GCap (and by extension Gold) in 2008, to drop local programming on the Gold stations in England from June 2010, whilst continuing to provide the four-hour daily opt-out for Wales as previously constituted.

=== 2014: Relaunch as Smooth Radio ===
On 24 March 2014, most Gold AM frequencies in England were turned over to Smooth Radio, following Global Radio's acquisition of Real and Smooth Ltd. The Gold stations in England which changed over simply swapped out Gold network programming for that of the London Smooth service, retaining local news and advertising opt-outs, whilst the regional Smooth FM stations regained local breakfast and drivetime shows.

In Wales, a four-hour local show was retained: initially this continued in the former Gold timeslot of midday to 4pm, opting out of the final hour of the Kate Garraway morning show and the entire networked afternoon show, however as of August 3, 2015 the show had opted out the final hour of Paul Phear's afternoon show and the entire drivetime show; at this point the FM stations in the Smooth network were carrying local shows at drivetime. In preparation for the introduction of a networked Smooth drive show with Angie Greaves in 2019, the Smooth Wales programme reverted to its former noon timeslot. Networked content from Smooth's London service is carried at other times, including breakfast and weekends.

== Frequencies ==
- DAB - South East Wales and North West Wales

Although available on digital radio in the area, Smooth Wales is not currently carried on DAB in Northeast Wales/West Cheshire. The service on 1260 kHz closed at 1:00PM on Friday 28th February 2025. The DAB service to south-east Wales was turned over from Gold to Smooth at the same time as the AM service was, and DAB transmissions to northwest Wales began when the new local DAB multiplex was switched on in December 2014.

Smooth Wales formerly broadcast on AM, transmitting on:

- 1260 kHz AM - North Wales and Cheshire
- 1305 kHz AM - Gwent and Newport
- 1359 kHz AM - Cardiff

Smooth Wales ceased broadcasting on AM in Wales over four years and four months, beginning with the South Wales medium wave service - the heritage AM sibling of the FM service now broadcast as Capital South Wales - which was switched off in October 2020, with the broadcast licence turned in to Ofcom, due to the redevelopment of one of the transmitter sites. Smooth Wales remains available in the area via DAB.

The station finally ceased broadcasting on AM in Wales with the North Wales medium wave service - the legacy heritage AM sibling of the FM service now broadcast as Capital North West and North Wales and the last remaining AM transmitter from Global Radio - being switched off at 1:00PM on Friday 28th February 2025, when as soon as it cut to static, the frequency picked up medium wave transmission from Leicester's Sabras Radio from the MW transmitter site at Freemen's Common.

== Programming ==
National programming for Wales is produced and broadcast from Global's Cardiff Bay studios from 12-4pm on weekdays. All networked programming originates from Global's London headquarters, including The Smooth Drive Home with Angie Greaves.

=== News ===
Global's Newsroom broadcasts hourly national news bulletins for Wales from 6 am – 7 pm on weekdays and 6 am – noon at weekends. The Cardiff Bay newsroom also produces bulletins for Heart and Capital's stations in north and south Wales.

National news updates air hourly from Global's London headquarters at all other times.
