= Wrexham and Chester Gold =

Gold North Wales and Cheshire
- Wales
- Broadcast area: Wrexham and Chester
- Frequency: 1260 kHz AM

Programming
- Format: Classic Hits

Ownership
- Owner: Global Radio

History
- First air date: 31 March 1989 as Marcher Gold; 5 September 1983 as Marcher Sound

Technical information
- Transmitter coordinates: 53.0924°N 2.8892°W

Links
- Website: www.mygoldmusic.co.uk

Gold North Wales and Cheshire (originally Marcher Gold and later Classic Gold Marcher) was a British Independent Local Radio station broadcasting to Wrexham, Chester, Flintshire and some of the Wirral, and was part of the Gold radio network. It is the "sister" station to local FM station, Marcher Sound, launched by Marcher Radio Group in 1989. After a period of sales and takeovers which led to Gold being operated by a separate company to its FM sister station, both are now owned by Global Radio. It is broadcast from Mold Road, Gwersyllt, Wrexham, although most programming comes from London. Gold North Wales and Cheshire was replaced by Smooth Radio in March 2014.

== History ==
The station launched in 1989 when new radio regulations prevented the simulcasting of independent local radio stations on AM radio bands, and therefore Marcher Radio Group created MFM 103.4 on FM, while the 1260 AM frequency became Marcher Gold. Both frequencies previously simulcast Marcher Sound.

Marcher Radio Group was purchased by GWR Group in 2000, which also included the sale of Marcher Gold. However, after regulations on how many stations one company could own, Marcher Gold became part of the Classic Gold radio network, when the majority stake of the network was sold to UBC Media, with GWR retaining 20%. As a consequence, all participating stations in the network were re-branded, and Marcher Gold became Classic Gold Marcher. Despite the changes in ownership, Classic Gold Marcher continued to share facilities with the GWR Group-owned former sister station, MFM 103.4.

GWR Group merged with Capital Radio Group in 2005, creating GCap Media. After approval from the regulator, GCap successfully purchased 18 of the Classic Gold Network stations from UBC and merged it with its own Capital Gold network, forming simply "Gold" on 3 August 2007. As a result, the station's Wrexham and Chester licence was renamed "Gold North Wales and Cheshire".

In 2008 GCap Media was purchased by Global Radio.

== Content ==
Since the renaming of the station as Gold, local content included a daily four-hour local show, at one time presented by Simon Nicks. Local news bulletins feature hourly from 6am until 6pm, with local headlines during breakfast and drivetime. There are also regular local travel bulletins and local commercial breaks. It generally focuses on classic hit and late 20th Century music.

When the station was providing local programmes in daytime, Drivetime ended an hour earlier than the rest of the Gold Network at 6pm for an hour-long Welsh language programme called Cŵl Cymru which was networked with Champion 103 and later repeated at 10pm on Coast 96.3. All stations are in the Marcher Radio Group network of Global Radio. The Welsh programming was later dropped from Gold (though remaining on the FM stations as required by their licences) such that Gold could take the networked programming from London outside of a single daily local four-hour programme, also the format used by Gold's stations in England until local programming was dropped on these in 2010.
