= Heart West Midlands =

English regional radio station

Coordinates: 52°28′27″N 1°55′0″W

- Birmingham; United Kingdom
- Broadcast area: West Midlands
- Frequencies: FM: 100.7 MHz; DAB: 11B (Wolverhampton & Shropshire); DAB: 11C (Birmingham); DAB: 12D (Coventry)
- RDS: Heart
- Branding: This is Heart

Programming
- Format: Hot AC
- Network: Heart

Ownership
- Owner: Global
- Sister stations: Capital Midlands; Smooth West Midlands

History
- First air date: 6 September 1994 (31 years ago)

Links
- Website: www.heart.co.uk/westmids/

Heart West Midlands is a regional radio station owned and operated by Global as part of the Heart network. It broadcasts to the West Midlands.

== History ==
Heart began broadcasting to the West Midlands on Tuesday 6 September 1994, as 100.7 Heart FM, becoming the UK's third Independent Regional Radio station, five days after Century Radio in the North East and Jazz FM North West.

The first song to be played on 100.7 Heart FM was Something Got Me Started by Simply Red. Its original format of "soft adult contemporary" music included artists such as Lionel Richie and Tina Turner. Reflecting this, its early slogan described the station as being "100.7 degrees cooler".

Its programming format was modified in 1996, a year after Chrysalis launched Heart 106.2 in London. The new format saw the "soft" AC music replaced with a generally more neutral Hot AC music playlist. This saw radio audience listening figures grow to equal that of local rival BRMB, which had been the leading commercial radio station in the West Midlands. New presenters were brought in from other stations; Daryl Denham arrived in 2000 from Hallam FM's breakfast show in a high-profile move, while Ian Danter and Carlos also arrived from BRMB.

One of Heart's most popular presenters, Tushar Makwana, was killed in 2004 following a burglary at his home which left him injured on his doorstep. The station's staff paid tribute to the presenter on-air, and campaigned for the person(s) responsible to be brought to justice. The station's reception area at the former Broad Street studios included a photographic tribute and plaque.

Following a corporate rebrand of the station, including a change of logo, the more contemporary look was soon reflected in the station's sound. The format was later described as more Hot AC and featured more music from the likes of Natasha Bedingfield, James Blunt and Keane as well as soul music from the 1970s, branded as Club Classics. During this relaunch, long-time presenters departed the station, such as Carlos, and Nick Piercey, to be replaced by younger presenters.

2005 saw the evacuation of its studios after West Midlands Police alerted staff and other civilians following a bomb alert in Birmingham's Broad Street complex. The station continued to operate, initially relaying sister station LBC News 1152 before transmission switched to the studios of Century 106 (now Hits Radio East Midlands) in Nottingham which broadcast reports from DNN journalists, who had to broadcast from a phone booth due to restrictions on the use of mobile phones.

On 11 September 2006, new station idents and jingles were used for the first time, and saw the station referred to purely as 'Heart' rather than '100.7 Heart FM'.

On 25 June 2007, it was announced that Heart along with its sister stations The Arrow, LBC and Galaxy were to be sold for £170 million to Global from Chrysalis Radio.

On 28 April 2008, Heart West Midlands began simulcasting most of its programmes from Heart 106.2 in London. By 2010, local programming from Birmingham was reduced to seven hours on weekdays and four hours on Saturday and Sunday.

In February 2019, following OFCOM's decision to relax local content obligations from commercial radio, Global announced it would replace Heart West Midlands' local breakfast and weekend shows with networked programming from London.

From 3 June 2019, the station's local output consisted of a three-hour Drivetime show on weekdays, alongside local news bulletins, traffic updates and advertising.

As of 24 February 2025 all programming originates from Global's London headquarters, including Heart Drive, presented each weekday by JK and Kelly Brook.

== Station information ==
Former logo until in 2004

The station was housed in 111 Broad Street - the same building as Global Radio-owned sister stations Capital Birmingham and The Arrow. The Digital News Network (DNN) also broadcast from the building until it ceased transmission in August 2006, to be replaced by LBC, whose regional DAB service was fully rolled out on 1 September.

In April 2013, Global moved its Birmingham operations from Broad Street to new studios at nearby Eleven Brindleyplace - Heart shares its facilities with sister stations Capital Midlands and Smooth West Midlands.

The FM signal - 11kW ERP - is broadcast from the Sutton Coldfield transmitter. The station is available on DAB, thanks to eight transmitters throughout the West Midlands on the MXR 12A multiplex, with strong signals from The Wrekin and Ilmington in south Warwickshire.

== News ==
Journalists within the West Midlands produce hourly regional news bulletins from 6am to 7pm on weekdays and from 6am to 12pm at weekends.

== Notable former presenters ==
Former presenters on the station include Ed James, Carlos, Daryl Denham, Nick Piercey, Ted Elliott (voice over), Sarah Jane Mee and Joel Ross.
