= Holyhead transmitting station =

Former transmitting station in Wales

Holyhead
- Holyhead transmitting station (Anglesey)
- Mast height: 30 metres (98 ft)
- Coordinates: 53°18′36″N 4°40′05″W
- Grid reference: SH223825
- Built: 1963/1964
- Demolished: post 1984
- Relay of: Llanddona
- BBC region: BBC Wales

The Holyhead transmitting station was a broadcast television facility located about 2.5 km to the west of Holyhead, on Anglesey, Wales. It had a self-supporting 30 m lattice mast erected on land that is itself about 76 m above sea level. The site was originally built by the BBC, entering service in early 1964 transmitting the now-defunct 405-line VHF television system.

When UHF 625-line colour TV came to north Wales in the 1970s, the locality fell into the service area of the main transmitter at Llanddona or the relay at Arfon and so this site was not needed as a repeater.

405-line television from Holyhead was shut down in January 1984. The site appears to have been demolished subsequently.

== Services listed by frequency ==
=== Analogue television ===
==== 24 February 1964 – January 1984 ====
BBC 405-line television started up with the site acting as an off-air relay transmitter of Llanddona about 35 km to the east. BBC research report 1963-50 shows that the town of Holyhead fell just outside the service area of the Llanddona main transmitter and points out that co-channel interference (presumably from Divis in Northern Ireland, about 170 km to the northwest across the Irish Sea) was "severe".

Frequency	VHF	kW	Service
61.75 MHz	4H	0.01	BBC Wales

==== January 1984 – present ====
405-line television was shut down at Llanddona in 1984 and Holyhead's Band I transmitter therefore ended its service after 20 years.

== See also ==
- List of masts
- List of tallest buildings and structures in Great Britain
