= Galaxy Digital =

- England
- Broadcast area: Selected areas across the UK
- Frequencies: DAB Digital Radio; Online (Live Audio Stream)

Programming
- Format: Rhythmic CHR

Ownership
- Owner: Galaxy Radio, Global Radio

Galaxy Digital was a radio station broadcasting through the digital platform across the United Kingdom and was owned by Global Radio. It primarily broadcast in areas where Galaxy was not represented on FM, such as London, Leicester, Nottingham, and Derbyshire. It also formerly broadcast in Central Scotland, until the relaunch of Xfm Scotland as Galaxy Scotland, at which point Galaxy Digital on DAB was replaced with a relay of Xfm London.

The digital station was a 'sister' radio station to the local Galaxy Network services in various areas. The digital service was broadcast largely from the Galaxy Yorkshire studios, and much of the content networked across the group came from this location.

Since Monday 21 January 2008, Galaxy Digital was changed from its own dedicated service (albeit with mostly network content) to broadcast almost entirely as a direct relay of Galaxy Yorkshire, though the 'Across Yorkshire' on-air tagline was replaced by 'Across the UK' on the digital service. (Online listeners to the Galaxy Digital site got a direct feed of the Yorkshire service, with the Yorkshire tagline). Since Friday 21 March 2008, the radio station changed their 'Passion for Music, Passion for Life' strap-line slogan to 'Love Music' ; the tagline changed again in 2010 to "The UK's Number One Hit Music Station" in preparation for the impending Capital relaunch (see below).

Galaxy Digital, as with the other Galaxy stations, specialised in mainstream pop/dance/urban music with shows such as 'Hirsty's Daily Dose' in the mornings and James Barr in the evenings. Galaxy Digital often played cut-down versions of songs (usually recurrents) to fill in for all or part of the commercial break whilst the other Galaxy Stations played regional adverts.

In January 2011, Galaxy Digital ceased to operate, due to the merger of Galaxy stations into The Capital FM Network by Global Radio.

== Broadcast areas ==
Galaxy Digital was initially created by then-owner Chrysalis to broadcast in areas where Galaxy was not available on FM. As such it was provided on the Switch Scotland regional DAB multiplex for Central Scotland, and on one of the London multiplexes, whilst in the East Midlands, where no regional multiplex is available, it broadcast on the two local multiplexes for Nottingham and Leicester (Derbyshire having yet to switch on a local multiplex).

Galaxy Digital was rolled out to a number of other DAB areas in 2009, following the removal of sister station Chill. In some areas of the South of England, a relay of Galaxy South Coast was added rather than Galaxy Digital.

Galaxy Digital carriage in Central Scotland ended following the relaunch of Xfm Scotland as Galaxy Scotland, at which point Galaxy Digital on DAB was replaced with a relay of Xfm London.

In 2009, Galaxy Digital and Xfm London were added to the South Wales regional DAB multiplex; Galaxy took the place of sister station Choice, which moved to Xfm's previous location on the local Cardiff and Bristol multiplexes. Whereas the other MXR regional multiplexes carried Galaxy (usually the nearest local variant), Galaxy had not been available on the Severn regional multiplex, as local service Kiss 101 (ironically, formerly Galaxy 101) had been provided as the "dance" station instead.

== Ownership ==
The Galaxy services were owned by Chrysalis Radio. On Monday 25 June 2007, it was announced that Chrysalis Radio, including the Galaxy Network, along with its sister stations The Arrow, LBC and Heart, were to be sold for £170 million to Global Radio by owners Chrysalis Group.

Chrysalis Radio became wholly owned by Global Radio on Monday 30 July 2007 when the transaction was completed; at this point the Chrysalis name ceased to be used.

Global Radio subsequently merged with GCap Media, owner of 95.8 Capital FM, Choice FM, XFM and others.

== Capital rebrand ==
In January 2011, as part of a brand relaunch, Galaxy stations across the UK were combined with London's 95.8 Capital FM and the stations of The Hit Music Network to form the new multi-station "Capital FM Network". Galaxy Digital was replaced by Capital in most areas, except where Capital already broadcast alongside Galaxy.

=== Removal of Capital/Galaxy overlap ===
The rebrand of Galaxy and Hit Music stations as a single network lead to overlaps in those areas where Galaxy Digital was available alongside 95.8 Capital FM or a local HMN station. The areas affected were London, Nottingham, Leicester and South Wales on DAB, and on digital TV platforms. (South Wales was also impacted, as Galaxy Digital was on the regional multiplex with Red Dragon - to become Capital South Wales - provided on the local Cardiff multiplex).

In November 2010, Galaxy was removed from the Sky Digital platform; its slot on channel 0112 was taken by moving LBC 97.3 from 0124 to 0112, and adding LBC News 1152 on 0124. Shortly afterward, Galaxy was removed from Virgin Media and also replaced with LBC News 1152. (In 2016, LBC News was replaced on TV platforms by Heart Extra.)

On DAB, Galaxy Digital was replaced with The Arrow on DAB in London in November 2010. In January 2011, Galaxy Digital on DAB in Leicester and Nottingham was replaced by Heart Digital (a relay of Heart 106.2 from London) - this was designed to coincide with the rebranding of Heart East Midlands as Gem 106.

As a result of the change, DAB listeners in South Wales could for a time receive two versions of Capital - on the MXR regional multiplex, 95.8 Capital FM (from London) had replaced Galaxy Digital, whilst the Cardiff local multiplex carried the local Capital (the former Red Dragon). Following the cessation of the MXR Severn regional multiplex, changes have been made: Capital South Wales remained on the expanded south-east Wales local ensemble (which expanded its coverage following the closure of the regional provision), and also secured carriage on the Swansea/Southwest Wales local multiplex, whilst Bristol, previously provided with Capital London on the regional ensemble, saw the London station added to the local multiplex in place of Choice FM.

In all other areas, where there was no overlap, a Capital station (usually the London service) has replaced Galaxy on DAB. All carriage of Galaxy as a service has ceased.

== Former Galaxy Radio Stations ==
Broadcast area	Pre-Capital FM branding	Post-Capital FM branding	Slogan
Birmingham and the West Midlands	Choice FM / Galaxy Birmingham	102.2 Capital FM	Birmingham's No.1 Hit Music Station
Greater Manchester	Galaxy Manchester	102 Capital FM	Manchester's No.1 Hit Music Station
Teesside / Tyne and Wear	Galaxy North East	105-106 Capital FM	The North East's No.1 Hit Music Station
Central Scotland (Glasgow / Edinburgh)	Beat 106 / Xfm Scotland / Galaxy Scotland	105-106 Capital FM	Scotland's No.1 Hit Music Station
South Coast	Power FM / Galaxy South Coast	103.2 Capital FM	The South Coast's No.1 Hit Music Station
Yorkshire	Galaxy Yorkshire	105 Capital FM	Yorkshire's No.1 Hit Music Station
