= Marcher Radio Group =

Former British media organisation

- Company type: Holding
- Industry: Media
- Founded: 1983
- Headquarters: Gwersyllt, Wrexham
- Products: Broadcasting
- Website: Global (parent company)

Marcher Radio Group Ltd, previously Marcher Sound Ltd, was a British media organisation which operated several radio stations in north Wales and northwest England. The company, now owned by Global Radio founded the independent local radio stations Marcher Sound, Coast 96.3, Buzz 97.1, Champion FM 103, and Wrexham and Chester Gold, part of the Gold Network.

== History ==
The company was established in 1983 after successfully acquiring a local radio licence to broadcast Marcher Sound to Wrexham, Deeside and Chester on 95.4 MHz FM/VHF (from the Wrexham-Rhos Relay) and 1260 kHz AM/Mediumwave. The station launched on 5 September 1983. After a review, the frequency changed to the more familiar 103.4 MHz.

In 1989 the station opened an FM relay to cover the coastal areas of north east Wales and The Wirral on 97.1 MHz from the Moel-y-Parc transmitting station.

Due to IBA rulings, the company ceased simulcasting and started broadcasting different services on each frequency. The newer 103.4 FM frequency became MFM 103.4, the 97.1 FM frequency became MFM 97.1, and the 1260 AM frequency became Marcher Gold.

In 1993, the company acquired the rights to broadcast to the north Wales coast on 96.3FM, including Llandudno, Holywell and eastern Anglesey, and named the service Marcher Coast FM.

In 1998, Marcher launched Champion 103 broadcasting to Anglesey and Gwynedd from the Arfon transmitting station.

In 1999, MFM 97.1 was re-branded Buzz 97.1, and it moved from Moel-y-Parc to the Storeton transmitter, to specifically target listeners in The Wirral. At the same time, Marcher Coast FM was re-branded "Coast 96.3".

Subsequent re-brands saw Buzz 97.1 become branded as "Wirral's Buzz", Champion FM 103 becoming simply "Champion", Coast 96.3 again becoming simply "Coast" and MFM 103.4 becoming Marcher Sound. In August 2007, 18 stations of the former Classic Gold Digital Network including Classic Gold Marcher were sold back to GCap Media, merging it with its own Capital Gold network. At this point Classic Gold Marcher was re-branded to simply "Wrexham and Chester Gold".

== Takeovers ==
In 2000, the company was purchased by GWR Group, which included all of its radio assets. This followed an attempt to expand the Group further, including bidding for another licence on Merseyside, which was later secured by Dune FM. In 2005, GWR Group and Capital Radio merged to form GCap Media.

Upon purchase, Marcher's four FM licences became part of The One Network, a nationwide network of independent local radio stations operated by GCap Media which syndicated much of its programming from GWR FM Bristol. The practice of programme simulcasting has been extensively used by Marcher in the past across its FM stations, and still continues this to an extent in its local programming opt-outs.

In 2005 GCap announced it was to sell many of its radio businesses, including those of Marcher Radio Group. However, in March 2006 the company called off the sale.

Following acquisition by Global Radio, the Marcher Radio stations broadcasting on FM were rebranded as Heart in June 2009. In 2010 three of the stations were merged into a new station, Heart North West and Wales. In 2014 subsequent changes saw the stations become part of the Capital FM Network.

== See also ==
- Buzz 97.1 - became Heart Wirral, now merged into Capital North West and Wales
- Champion 103 - now Capital Cymru
- Marcher Sound - became Heart Wrexham, now merged into Capital North West and Wales
- Coast 96.3 - became Heart North Wales Coast, now merged into Capital North West and Wales
