= Heart Digital =

British digital radio network

Heart Digital was a digital radio network of stations that broadcast on DAB Digital Radio in the North East of England (on the MXR North East multiplex), the North West of England (MXR North West), Yorkshire (MXR Yorkshire), South Wales and the West of England (MXR Severn Estuary) and in Central Scotland (Switch Scotland), as part of the Heart network.

Heart Digital is now closed; listeners now hear Heart London or a local Heart service instead. Global also used this same approach with their Galaxy branded stations, where Galaxy Yorkshire replaced Galaxy Digital.

== Background ==
The stations were in the Hot AC format, although some suggested that they broadcast strong Adult contemporary music. The station's breakfast show was a delayed simulcast of Heart 106.2's breakfast show with Jamie Theakston and Harriet Scott. Other presenters included Paul Hollins and Steve Denyer. The station's Programme Manager was Carol Cheetham.

Saturday nights from 6 pm to 2 am had a show called "Club Classics", which featured uninterrupted disco music. After the move to simulcast more with Heart London, the shows became presenter-led.

Most of the MXR multiplex services ceased in 2013 (Yorkshire's continued to 2015). In 2014 regional Real Radio services in south Wales, central Scotland, Yorkshire, the North West and the North East – all areas into which Heart Digital had once broadcast – were relaunched as Heart stations on FM and DAB, carrying localised programming, news and advertising alongside Heart network content.

Heart continues to broadcast a digital service, which relays all the output of Heart London, into areas where Heart is not currently represented on FM (including the East Midlands) and nationally via digital TV platforms.

== Chrysalis Radio Sold ==
On 25 June 2007 it was announced that Heart along with its sister stations The Arrow, LBC and Galaxy were to be sold for £170 million to Global Radio from Chrysalis Radio.

== See also ==
- Heart
