= Wrexham City Radio =

Wrexham; Wales
- Broadcast area: Wrexham and surrounding areas
- Frequency: 105 MHz

Programming
- Format: Community radio

Ownership
- Owner: Premier Radio CIC

History
- First air date: March 2020
- Former names: Premier Radio (2020–2026)

Links
- Website: premier-radio.co.uk

Wrexham City Radio (formerly Premier Radio) is a community radio station serving Wrexham and surrounding areas.

The station is owned and operated by Premier Radio, a community interest company, and broadcasts from studios and offices located at the Eagles Meadow area of the city centre.

In April 2025, the station took over the community licence formerly held by Calon FM.

== Overview ==
Premier Radio was initially launched as an online service in response to the COVID-19 pandemic in March 2020.

Two years later, the station opened its studio at Eagles Meadow and in February 2024, it began broadcasting on the Wrexham DAB multiplex after securing a C-DSP licence.

In April 2025, Premier Radio began broadcasting on 105 FM after securing the community radio licence previously held by Calon FM until the station's closure.

In February 2026, the station was rebranded as Wrexham City Radio.
