= Heart Cheshire and North East Wales =

Wrexham; Wales
- Broadcast area: Cheshire and North East Wales
- Frequency: 103.4 MHz

Programming
- Format: Adult Contemporary

History
- First air date: 5 September 1983
- Last air date: 1 July 2010

Technical information
- Power: 1.2 kW

Heart Cheshire and North East Wales (formerly Marcher Sound and previously MFM 103.4) was an Independent Local Radio station broadcasting to north east Wales and Cheshire from its Mold Road studios in Gwersyllt, Wrexham, also shared with Gold and Heart Wirral.

The station was last owned and operated by Global Radio who purchased the previous owner, GCap Media, the group formed by the merger of GWR Group and Capital Radio Group. GWR purchased Marcher Radio Group in October 2000, although the latter remains as the official licensee of the station, which now forms part of Capital North West and Wales.

The station was broadcast from the Wrexham-Rhos Relay, situated just above The Moss near Wrexham, and although it officially broadcast to the Wrexham and Chester areas, it could also be heard in parts of Merseyside and Shropshire.

== History ==
=== Early years ===
Marcher Sound's final logo

Originally the flagship station for what became the Marcher Radio Group, Marcher Sound (Sain-Y-Gororau in Welsh), licensed by the Independent Broadcasting Authority, began broadcasting at 6.30 am on Monday 5 September 1983 on 95.4FM and 238 metres (1260 kHz medium wave). The first voice heard on air was the station's chairman, Lord Evans of Claughton and the first track played was Cliff Richard's Wired for Sound. Using the strapline Your station, your sound, Marcher broadcast in both English and Welsh to a potential audience of 660,000 listeners.

Marcher Sound was initially founded by a group of five redundant workers from the former Shotton steelworks, which closed in 1980. The six-strong consortium won the franchise in March 1981, seeing off two rival bids from 'Radio Offa' and 'Border Sound'. The group attracted funding from local businessmen and the Welsh Development Agency and shareholdings from neighbouring station Radio City. Within two years of its launch, Radio City pulled out, the original management had left and the station was in severe financial difficulties. Further investment was sought and Marcher Sound came close to a buyout by Chiltern Radio. Crown Communications, the UK subsidiary of the Toowoomba-based Darling Downs Television, later bought shares in the station.

Marcher initially broadcast for around 12.5 hours a day from 6am-6.30 pm (6am-6pm at weekends), with a daily Welsh language news programme on weekdays and a bilingual magazine show on Sunday. Radio City programming was relayed during downtime. Local programming later increased to 10 pm and soon, until midnight, before a full 24-hour service began in 1987. Around the same time, the station's main FM frequency changed from 95.4 to 103.4 FM on the Wrexham-Rhos transmitter, following a spectrum audit. A relay was added on 97.1 FM from the Moel-y-Parc transmitter, initially aimed at coastal areas of North East Wales.

=== Split frequencies ===
In 1989, Marcher Sound split its FM and AM frequencies into two separate services. MFM 103.4 featured chart-led music while Marcher Sound continued on 1260 kHz before being relaunched as Marcher Gold, carrying a classic hits playlist. The station continues to broadcast today as Smooth Wales, part of the Smooth Radio network.

A further split on MFM's service came when it refocused the target area of its relay frequency to the Wirral. A separate breakfast show for the area, produced from Wrexham was introduced, followed in 1993 by further local programming from a studio in Birkenhead. The move of the transmitter to Storeton led to the Wirral service being relaunched as a separate entity, Wirral's Buzz on 14 February 1999.

Marcher Sound's logo from 2006 to 2007, after it was rebranded from MFM

=== GWR ownership ===
In 2001, the Marcher Radio Group – now consisting of five stations in North Wales, the Wirral and Cheshire – was bought out by GWR. Four years later, the owners attempted to sell off the stations, although despite several offers, the sale was called off five months later.

On Monday 25 September 2006, the station was renamed 103.4 Marcher Sound, reviving their initial branding in keeping with GCap's decision to gradually erode the FM term from its FM services. Following Global Radio's takeover of GCap in 2008, the station became part of the Heart network in June 2009, relaunching as Heart Cheshire and North East Wales.

=== Station merger ===
On 21 June 2010, Global Radio announced plans to merge the station with Heart North Wales Coast and Heart Wirral as part of plans to reduce the Heart network of stations from 33 to 15, leading to the end of separate local programming for the Wrexham and Chester area.

Heart North West and Wales began broadcasting from Wrexham on Friday 2 July 2010. On Tuesday 6 May 2014, the station became part of the sister Capital FM network and relaunched again as Capital North West and Wales, with enhanced Heart output moving to a new regional station for North and Mid Wales, owned by Communicorp. Both stations continue to broadcast regional programming at peak times from the former Marcher studios at Gwersyllt in Wrexham.
