= Calon FM =

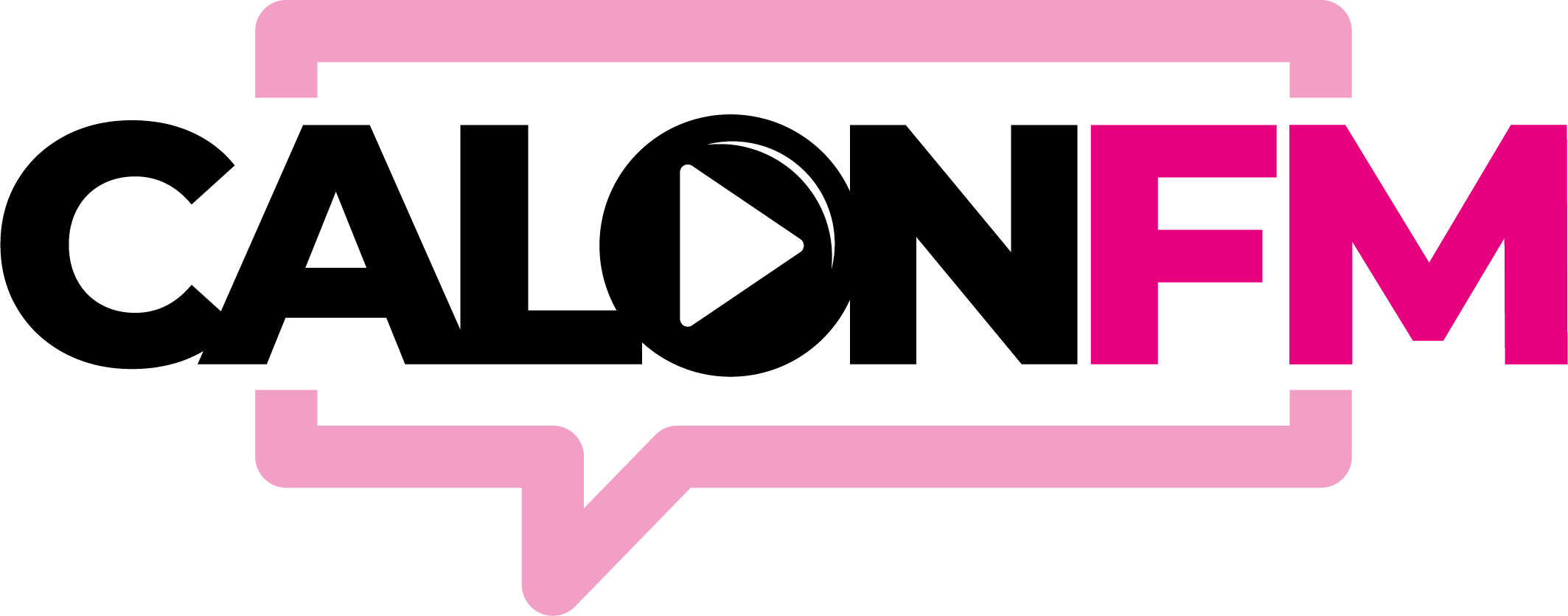

Wrexham; Wales
- Broadcast area: Wrexham and surrounding areas
- Frequency: 105 MHz

Programming
- Format: Community radio

Ownership
- Owner: Wrexham Community Broadcasting

History
- First air date: 1 March 2008
- Last air date: April 2025

Links
- Website: calon.fm

Calon FM was a community radio station serving Wrexham and surrounding areas. (Calon means "heart".)

The station was first launched as a RSL radio station, originally covering events at the 2005 Wrexham Science Festival on 87.7 FM. In 2006, the station was granted a 5-year community radio licence. The station officially launched on Saturday 1 March 2008 on 105 FM in Wrexham after a short period of test transmissions.

Calon FM was originally based on the campus of Glyndŵr University on Mold Road, initially based above a recording studio before moving into the Centre for Creative Industries (CCI). In its second incarnation, the station was based at the Wrexham Enterprise Hub in the city centre with its transmitter atop Tŷ Pawb ("Everyone's House").

The station's output consisted of music, features, sport, talk and specialist programming produced and presented by volunteers, including weekly programming in Welsh and other languages.

Besides its primary transmission area, the station could also be heard through much of the central areas of Wrexham County Borough, and parts of southern Flintshire.

In August 2017, Calon FM began carrying live commentaries on Wrexham A.F.C. matches throughout the football season. The station's live coverage ended after two seasons.

Calon FM also won a number of industry awards, including the Wales category in the Radio Academy Nations and Regions Awards twice in a row, in 2013 and 2014.

== First closure and revival ==
On 31 December 2020, it was reported that Calon FM would close, following a decision by Glyndŵr University to withdraw its support. The university had provided funding and studio facilities to the station since its launch.

In a statement, directors said the long-term financial position of the station's owners, Calon Communications Ltd, was left untenable as a result of the withdrawal, despite being able to raise additional income through advertising and sponsorship.

A Glyndŵr University spokesperson said it had spent more than £1 million on staff, equipment and indirect costs for studios and professional services.

In a later statement, the station's volunteers criticised the board of directors for the decision and announced they were forming a rescue plan to retain the FM licence and resume broadcasting.

Calon FM ceased broadcasting at midday on Wednesday 20 January 2021.

Following a tender process involving three separate groups, the station's assets were handed over to its volunteer staff, who relaunched the Calon service under the ownership of a new community interest company, "Wrexham Community Broadcasting". The group launched a campaign to secure funds to resume broadcasting.

On 8 October 2021, Calon FM announced it had resumed broadcasting after the original licence was transferred by OFCOM to the station's new owners. Test transmissions, including some presenter-led programming, were broadcast ahead of a soft launch of the station on Monday 11 October 2021.

Wrexham Community Broadcasting was also part of Wrexham DAB Ltd, a consortium which applied for a small-scale DAB multiplex in its broadcast area.

It was the only applicant in North Wales when bidding closed, and in May 2022, OFCOM announced that the consortium had been awarded a SS-DAB licence.

== Closure ==
In April 2025, OFCOM announced that Calon FM's licence had been transferred again from Wrexham Community Broadcasting to Premier Radio (now Wrexham City Radio), a community interest company which had been broadcasting a local radio service for Wrexham online since 2020 and on DAB since 2024.

The station's licence had been due to expire in March 2028, following a renewal by OFCOM at the end of 2022.
