= Capital Anglesey & Gwynedd =

Former Welsh-language radio station

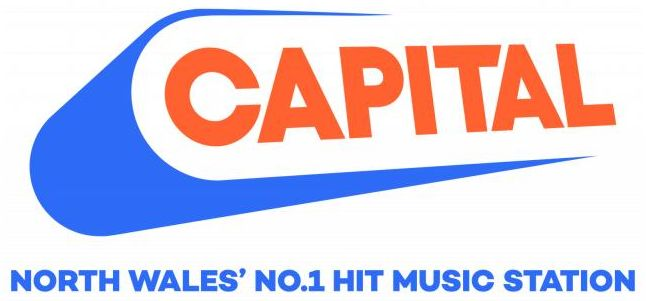
- United Kingdom
- Broadcast area: Anglesey and Gwynedd
- Frequencies: DAB: 12D North Wales; FM: 103.0 MHz Gwynedd
- Branding: North Wales' No.1 Hit Music Station

Programming
- Format: CHR
- Network: Heart (2009–2014); Capital (2014–present)

Ownership
- Owner: Global
- Sister stations: Capital North West and North Wales; Capital South Wales

History
- First air date: 11 December 1998 (as Champion 103; March 2009 (as Heart Cymru); 6 May 2014 (as Capital Cymru)

Technical information
- Transmitter coordinates: 53.0199°N 4.2732°W

Links
- Webcast: Global Player

Capital Anglesey & Gwynedd, formerly known as Capital Cymru, is a local radio station owned and operated by Global. The station broadcasts to Anglesey and Gwynedd via the Arfon transmitting station.

Previously, the station formed part of the Heart network, and earlier, the Marcher Radio Group. It switched to the Capital network on 6 May 2014. Heart North and Mid Wales now covers the region as part of the Heart network.

== Overview ==
Although the official transmission area takes in most of the Isle of Anglesey and a large part of Gwynedd (as far south as Harlech), the location of its transmitter means the signal carries across Cardigan Bay and can be heard in parts of Pembrokeshire and even in Ireland. Capital Cymru is also available on the North West Wales local DAB digital radio multiplex—broadcasting alongside the North Wales Coast feed of Capital North West and Wales.

Up until 21 February 2025, the station aired local programming in the Welsh language with the Capital network's playlist tweaked to include contemporary Welsh language music.

== History ==
When it launched in December 1998 as Champion 103, it was the first commercial radio station to serve Anglesey and Gwynedd as a whole, although Marcher Coast 96.3 had been broadcasting to a small part of the area for some time from its Colwyn Bay studios.

Originally owned and operated by the Marcher Radio Group, Champion 103 broadcast from studios at Parc Menai in Bangor, Gwynedd - later sharing its facilities with Coast 96.3. In 2000, the four Marcher stations - including Champion - were brought by the GWR Group and became part of The One Network.

In March 2009, following Global Radio's takeover of GCap Media, Champion was rebranded as Heart Cymru as part of a rollout of the Heart network across 29 local radio stations owned by Global. By this point, local programming had been reduced to ten hours on weekdays and seven hours at weekends.

In July 2010, Global closed the Bangor studios and moved Heart Cymru's operations to the former Marcher headquarters in Gwersyllt, near Wrexham. By this point, the three Heart stations serving North Wales Coast, Cheshire & North East Wales and the Wirral were merged into one regional station, Heart North West and Wales. Heart Cymru was not affected by the network restructuring.

On 6 February 2014, Global announced that Heart Cymru would be rebranded as Capital, with the North Wales licence of Real Radio Wales being sold to Communicorp and relaunched as a new separate Heart station for North and Mid Wales.

Capital Cymru was launched on 6 May 2014. All local output, including extended Welsh language shows, news bulletins and network opt-outs were retained.

On 23 May 2019, Capital Cymru dropped all of Capital's networked programming and introduced a full schedule of local output, including an additional Welsh-language daytime show. The station retained both the Capital branding and the tweaked CHR music playlist.

The Official Big Top 40, simulcast on Heart North Wales, continued to air on Sunday afternoons. Outside programming hours, the station broadcast automated output, including a full hour of Welsh language music at 5am on weekday mornings.

In January 2025, it was reported that Capital Cymru would lose all of its Welsh language programming following the broadcast regulator Ofcom's decision to relax local content obligations for commercial radio, apart from news.

The station ended local programming in Welsh at 7pm on 21 February 2025 before resuming network programming from London two days later, effectively becoming a relay of Capital North West and North Wales. It now simulcasts a national drivetime show for Wales on weekdays, presented by Josh Andrews and Kally Davies and broadcast from Global's Cardiff Bay studios. Local news and traffic bulletins were retained.

== Programming ==
Most networked programming originates from Global's London headquarters.

National programming for Wales is produced and broadcast from Global's Cardiff Bay studios on weekdays from 4–7pm, presented by Josh Andrews and Kally Davies.

=== News ===
Global’s Cardiff Bay newsroom broadcasts hourly localized news updates from 6 am–6 pm on weekdays and 8 am–12 pm at weekends.

== See also ==
- List of Celtic-language media
