= Llanddona transmitting station =

Transmitter site in Anglesey, Wales

Llanddona
- Location within Anglesey
- Mast height: 106.7 metres (350 ft)
- Coordinates: 53.306944°N 4.128333°W
- Grid reference: SH583810
- Built: 1958
- BBC region: BBC Wales
- ITV region: ITV Cymru Wales

The Llanddona transmitting station ((/lænˈdɒnæ/; Welsh: [ɬanˈðɔna]); Welsh pronunciation) is a broadcasting and telecommunications facility, situated at Llanddona, near Beaumaris, on the isle of Anglesey, Wales (grid reference SH583810). It comprises a 106.7 metres (350 ft) guyed mast with antennas attached at various heights. It is owned and operated by Arqiva.

== History ==
The station was built by the BBC in 1958 to provide a 405-line Band I (VHF) TV service and (later) a VHF (FM) radio services for north west Wales, including the Lleyn peninsula, Anglesey and the north Wales coast. ITV's service was provided from the Arfon transmitting station, approximately 20 miles to the south on the mainland.

In 1967 the site became the area's main station for 625 line colour UHF TV, starting with just BBC Two in June of that year. By this time, it was policy to co-site all UHF TV services at the same site, and by 1973 Llanddona was broadcasting BBC One, BBC Two and ITV on UHF. S4C was added later in 1982 in time for its launch.

Though 405-line TV was discontinued in the UK in 1985, it seems that Llanddona shut down its VHF TV a year early.

In the late 1990s, digital TV transmitters were added, carrying all six national multiplexes.

In 2006, digital radio transmitters were added for the BBC's national multiplex and also Digital One.

On Wednesday 21 October 2009, the Llanddona group of transmitters underwent the first stage of the Digital Switchover and on Wednesday 18 November 2009, analogue television was finally turned off from Llanddona and its group of transmitters as it underwent the second stage of the Digital Switchover. Whilst the old analogue channels were in the UK UHF C/D aerial group, the new DVB channels are now spread over into the E group (presumably to avoid co-channel interference with Winter Hill transmitter), meaning that some customers may need to replace their aerial to get optimum reception.

Freeview HD started transmitting using the BBC B multiplex on channel 53 in July 2010.

Llanddona was the site of the first TV, VHF radio, digital TV and digital radio broadcasts for the area.

== Coverage area ==
The coverage area consists of the majority of Anglesey, and a wide range of other parts of the North West Wales coast. As with the service areas of other transmitters in North Wales, such as the Moel-y-Parc transmitting station, signal overspill from transmitters in North West England and Greater Manchester means that strong radio and television signals from that region (BBC North West and ITV Granada) can be received in North Wales, and strong Welsh signals can be received in North West England also. In the days of analogue TV, some people who received signals from the Llanddona transmitter, but who had no interest in S4C (a Welsh speaking channel) were known to erect a second aerial and receive Channel 4 from Winter Hill instead.

The transmitter signals were also received across the Irish sea in many parts of the east and south east coast of the Republic of Ireland, mainly in counties Dublin and Wicklow. From 1958 onward, many households in these counties would point their outdoor aerials towards the Irish sea and could receive transmission from this transmitter. When cable television launched in the early 1970s, the Welsh BBC and ITV stations were provided on the cable platform as these channels were mainly received in the Dublin and Wicklow counties.

== Services listed by frequency ==
=== Analogue television ===
==== January 1958 - 3 June 1967 ====
it is unclear when transmissions began. "The Big Tower" claim that 405-line television from Llanddona started in January 1958, and the entrance plaque to the transmitter building certainly agrees that the mast and its building were built in 1958. Oddly, BBC research report 1963-50 does not mention a start date though it does point out that co-channel interference (presumably from Divis in Northern Ireland, about 180 km to the northwest across the Irish Sea) was "severe". This caused the transmitter's useful service area to be smaller than planned, and forced the building of the Holyhead relay.

"405 Alive" counter-claim a very precise date of 15 May 1962 for the start of 405-line television.

Frequency	VHF	kW	Service
45.00 MHz	1V	6	BBC Television Service (until 1960); BBC TV (1960-1964); BBC Cymru Wales (from 1964)

==== 3 June 1967 - 6 September 1973 ====
The first UHF transmitter at the site entered service.

Frequency	VHF	UHF	kW	Service
45.00 MHz	1V	—	6	BBC Cymru Wales
807.25 MHz	—	63	100	BBC2 Wales

==== 6 September 1973 - 1 November 1982 ====
HTV's transmissions certainly started on 6 September, but is likely that the BBC1 Wales UHF service had already commenced before then.

Frequency	VHF	UHF	kW	Service
45.00 MHz	1V	—	6	BBC Wales (BBC Cymru Wales until 1981)
759.25 MHz	—	57	100	BBC Wales (BBC Cymru Wales until 1981)
783.25 MHz	—	60	100	HTV Wales
807.25 MHz	—	63	100	BBC2 Wales

==== 1 November 1982 - 5th January 1984 ====
Channel 4 launched across the UK. Being in Wales, Llanddona transmitted the S4C variant.

Frequency	VHF	UHF	kW	Service
45.00 MHz	1V	—	6	BBC Wales
727.25 MHz	—	53	100	S4C
759.25 MHz	—	57	100	BBC Wales
783.25 MHz	—	60	100	HTV Wales
807.25 MHz	—	63	100	BBC2 Wales

==== 5th January 1984 - 15 November 1998 ====
The 405-line VHF TV transmission was discontinued after 22 years of service.

Frequency	UHF	kW	Service
727.25 MHz	53	100	S4C
759.25 MHz	57	100	BBC1 Wales (BBC Wales until 1985)
783.25 MHz	60	100	HTV Wales
807.25 MHz	63	100	BBC2 Wales

=== Analogue and digital television ===
==== 15 November 1998 - 21 October 2009 ====
Digital Television was launched. At first it was low because it would cause Inference for the analogue channels.

Frequency	UHF	kW	Service	System
674.000 MHz	46	1	Arqiva (Mux D)	DVB-T
706.000 MHz	50	1	BBC (Mux 1)	DVB-T
727.25 MHz	53	100	S4C	PAL System I
738.166 MHz	54+	1	Digital 3&4 (Mux 2)	DVB-T
759.25 MHz	57	100	BBC1 Wales	PAL System I
770.166 MHz	58+	1	SDN (Mux A)	DVB-T
783.25 MHz	60	100	HTV Wales	PAL System I
794.166 MHz	61+	1	BBC (Mux B)	DVB-T
807.25 MHz	63	100	BBC2 Wales	PAL System I
818.166 MHz	64+	1	Arqiva (Mux C)	DVB-T

==== 21 October 2009 - 18 November 2009 ====
The BBC2 analogue signal was switched off after 32 years of service, and BBC1 analogue was moved to channel 63. Multiplex 1 on channel 50 was also discontinued. The new "BBC A" multiplex took over on channel 57 which had just been vacated by BBC1 analogue with its full post-DSO ERP of 20 kW. BBC A is an expanded version of the BBC's multiplexes 1 and B (with several channels, such as BBC Four and radio stations temporarily available on both BBC multiplexes).

Frequency	UHF	kW	Service	System
674.000 MHz	46	1	Arqiva (Mux D)	DVB-T
727.25 MHz	53	100	S4C	PAL System I
738.166 MHz	54+	1	Digital 3&4 (Mux 2)	DVB-T
762.000 MHz	57	20	BBC A	DVB-T
770.166 MHz	58+	1	SDN (Mux A)	DVB-T
783.25 MHz	60	100	HTV Wales	PAL System I
794.166 MHz	61+	1	BBC (Mux B)	DVB-T
807.25 MHz	63	100	BBC1 Wales	PAL System I
818.166 MHz	64+	1	Arqiva (Mux C)	DVB-T

=== Digital television ===
==== 18 November 2009 - 14 November 2012 ====
All the remaining analogue TV was discontinued, and the new post-DSO multiplexes took over their frequencies plus a couple of new ones. Frequencies above 800 MHz were not re-used as these will be reassigned to 4G mobile phone services.

Frequency	UHF	kW	Operator
650.000 MHz	43	10	SDN
674.000 MHz	46	10	Arqiva A
706.000 MHz	50	10	Arqiva B
730.000 MHz	53	20	BBC B
762.000 MHz	57	20	BBC A
786.000 MHz	60	20	Digital 3&4

==== 14 November 2012 -??? ====
As a side-effect of frequency-changes elsewhere in the region to do with clearance of the 800 MHz band for 4G mobile phone use, Llanddona's "Arqiva B" multiplex was moved from channel 50 to channel 40, and "D3&4" on channel 60 gained a negative frequency offset.

Frequency	UHF	kW	Operator
682.000 MHz	47 (was 40).	10	Arqiva B
634.000 MHz	41 (was 43)	10	SDN
658.000 MHz	44 (was 46)	10	Arqiva A
674.000 MHz	46 (was 53	20	BBC B
626.000 MHz	40 (was 57)	20	BBC A
650.000 MHz	43 (was 60-	20	Digital 3&4

- Aerial group: W
- Polarisation: horizontal

=== Analogue radio ===
==== 1960 - Early 1990s ====
VHF FM radio was in service by October 1960 as evidenced by a BBC research report.

Frequency	kW	Service
89.6 MHz	12	BBC Light Programme
91.8 MHz	12	BBC Third Programme
94.0 MHz	12	BBC Welsh Home Service

==== Early 1990s - present ====
Radio 1 got its own frequency and National Radio 4 was added to the set. Additionally, the frequencies for the original three services were increased by 200 kHz each.

Frequency	kW	Service
89.8 MHz	21	BBC Radio 2
92.0 MHz	21	BBC Radio 3
94.2 MHz	21	BBC Radio Cymru
94.8 MHz	10	BBC Radio Wales
99.4 MHz	21	BBC Radio 1
103.6 MHz	21	BBC Radio 4

=== Digital radio ===
Frequency	Block	kW	Operator
222.064 MHz	11D	1	Digital One
225.648 MHz	12B	5	BBC National DAB

== See also ==
- List of masts
