= Heart Wirral =

Coordinates: 53°4′33.2″N 3°1′15.7″W

Wrexham; England
- Broadcast area: Wirral, east Flintshire
- Frequency: 97.1 MHz

Programming
- Format: Variety hit radio

History
- First air date: 31 March 1989
- Last air date: 2 July 2010

Heart Wirral (formerly Wirral's Buzz) was an Independent Local Radio station broadcasting to the Wirral Peninsula, sharing its facilities with Heart Wrexham and Gold, in Gwersyllt, Wrexham.

== History ==
Wirral's Buzz's final logo

The station, owned by Global Radio (originally by Marcher Radio Group), broadcast a mix of popular music and presenter chat. Launched in 1989 as MFM 97.1 (an opt-out service from the main Marcher Sound output), the station relaunched as Wirral's Buzz on 14 February 1999, before becoming Heart Wirral in 2009. The station was broadcast from the Storeton transmitter on Storeton ridge in Higher Bebington. Although the area of the licence was Wirral, it could be received as far east as Warrington and as far west as Ruthin in the Heart Wrexham region.

In November 2005, it was announced that GCap's former Marcher Radio Group stations, including Buzz, were to be sold. This was due to the fact that they were outside of the company's primary target area, however in 2006 GCap decided to call off the sales. Up until June 2008, the station's line-up of networked shows featured some programming from the Century lineup such as Hairbrush Divas. Century's former owner Capital Radio merged with Buzz's former owner GWR to form GCap Media.

== Closure ==
On 21 June 2010, Global Radio announced plans to close Heart Wirral and merge the station with Heart Cheshire and North East Wales and Heart North Wales Coast as part of plans to reduce the Heart network of stations from 33 to 15. Heart North West and Wales, began broadcasting from Wrexham on Friday 2 July 2010.

Following Global's purchase of the Real Radio and Smooth Radio stations from GMG Radio in 2012, Heart North West and Wales was replaced by Capital North West and Wales, as the previous Real Radio North West and Real Radio Wales stations were rebranded as Heart North West and Heart Wales, along with the rest of the Real Radio network of stations.

== See also ==
- Capital North West and Wales
- Heart North West
- Heart Wales
