= The Arrow (radio station) =

British radio station

Coordinates: 51°30′37″N 0°7′45″W

- United Kingdom
- Frequency: DAB: 11B (Greater London)

Programming
- Format: Rock music

Ownership
- Owner: Global
- Sister stations: Capital; Capital Xtra; Chill; Classic FM; Gold; Heart; LBC; Smooth Radio; Radio X

History
- First air date: July 2001
- Last air date: 1 September 2019

Links
- Website: www.thearrow.co.uk

The Arrow was a British digital radio station playing classic and contemporary rock music. It broadcast on DAB Digital Radio (in London) and was also streamed over digital satellite TV and online. The station was operated by Global; prior to Global's formation it was owned by their predecessor Chrysalis Radio.

== Changes and relocations ==
Launched in July 2001, The Arrow was at one point presenter-led, with programmes hosted by DJs (though usually voicetracked rather than live). There were also hourly news bulletins and the ability to opt out for local travel bulletins. The news, travel and on-air presenters have now been removed, with the station switching to non-stop music.

In May 2008, The Arrow ceased broadcasting on London's DRG digital radio multiplex. A portion of the Arrow's space, along with a smaller slot that was previously used by Bauer Group's Smash Hits Radio, was reused to launch Bauer-owned alternative/rock station Q Radio onto the DRG multiplex.

The Arrow was removed from Virgin Media channel 921 on 21 June 2009 and Sky channel 0161 on 22 June 2009.

In February 2009, The Arrow was removed from the Switch Scotland regional DAB service, and replaced by Gold.

In Yorkshire, the station has been moved from the regional DAB multiplex to local multiplexes; the move was to make way for XFM London, which moved in the other direction.

In February 2010 The Arrow was removed from the MXR Severn Estuary multiplex. Although DAB radios within the reach of that multiplex still displayed The Arrow as the received station, in fact XFM now broadcast on that channel.

In November 2010, The Arrow returned to London on DRG London replacing Galaxy Digital, following the decision to combine the Galaxy Network with 95.8 Capital FM (and The Hit Music Network) to form the new Capital FM Network, a change which came into force from January 2011. The Arrow was chosen to replace Galaxy as it was the only Global Radio station not already available on DAB in London. In the East Midlands, where the Hit Music Network stations became Capital, Galaxy was replaced with Heart London (this was tied in with Gem 106 replacing Heart East Midlands).

In December 2010, Bauer Radio removed Global's oldies music service Gold (which competed with Bauer's own Magic stations) from its local multiplexes in Central Lancashire, Humberside, Leeds, Liverpool, South Yorkshire, Teesside and Tyne and Wear, and replaced it with Absolute Classic Rock after signing a new deal with Absolute Radio for the space. Global retaliated by withdrawing The Arrow from the three Bauer multiplexes it broadcast on - Bauer Humberside, Bauer Leeds and Bauer South Yorkshire - and from MXR North East and MXR North West, replacing it in all these locations with Gold. This allowed coverage of Gold to continue in all these areas, though it created an overlap in Manchester (where Gold would be available both on CE Manchester and MXR North West) - this overlap continued until the cessation of the MXR service in 2013. The move also resulted in The Arrow's DAB service being available solely in London.

Many of these changes have come about as part of Global rearranging its digital assets following their acquisition of GCap Media; Global have also made changes to the distribution and availability of other stations in their portfolio, including Galaxy, Heart, Chill, XFM and Gold since the merger.

On 22 April 2014, Real Radio (Wales) was withdrawn from digital satellite TV, due to the impending integration (due on 6 May) of Real stations into the Heart network (with Heart London already being provided on satellite.) The satellite broadcast, which occupied Sky channel 0146, was replaced with a relay of The Arrow, returning to national satellite transmission after nearly five years away. Following the launch of Smooth Extra, 0146 was turned over to the new station and withdrawn from The Arrow: broadcast of The Arrow to DAB in London and online continued as before.

Following the switch to an automated service, spot advertising breaks on The Arrow ceased for a time: advertisements returned to The Arrow in late 2016.

It finally closed on 1 September 2019, with the DAB space it inhabited being used by a replacement station by its owners, Global. The last track played was "End of the line" by the Traveling Wilburys.

In February 2023, three and a half years after the closure of The Arrow, Global reintroduced a similar adult rock format to digital radio with the establishment of 'Radio X Classic Rock as a DAB+ sibling of Radio X.

== Ownership ==
On 25 June 2007 it was announced that The Arrow along with its sister stations Heart, LBC and Galaxy were to be sold for £170 million to Global Radio from Chrysalis Radio.
