= Capital North West and North Wales =

British regional radio station

Coordinates: 53.0765°N 3.0224°W

- Wrexham; United Kingdom
- Broadcast area: North East Wales, North West Wales, West Cheshire, parts of Shropshire and the Wirral Peninsula
- Frequencies: DAB: 10D/12D MuxCo North Wales; DAB: 12D MuxCo North Wales; DAB: 10D MuxCo Wrexham, Chester & Liverpool; FM: 96.3 MHz North Wales Coast; FM: 97.1 MHz Wirral; FM: 103.0 MHz Gwynedd; FM: 103.4 MHz Wrexham and Chester

Programming
- Format: Contemporary hit radio
- Network: Heart (2010–2014); Capital (2014–present)

Ownership
- Owner: Global
- Sister stations: Capital Anglesey & Gwynedd; Capital South Wales

History
- First air date: 6 May 2014

Links
- Website: www.capitalfm.com/northwales/ Capital Wirral

Capital North West and North Wales is a regional radio station owned and operated by Global as part of the Capital network. It broadcasts to Cheshire, Shropshire, the Wirral Peninsula, North East Wales & North West Wales.

The station was previously part of the Heart radio network, which began broadcasting on 2 July 2010 as a result of a merger between Heart Cheshire and North East Wales (formerly Marcher Sound), Heart Wirral (formerly Wirral's Buzz) and Heart North Wales Coast (formerly Coast 96.3). It switched to Capital on 6 May 2014.

== History ==
The regional station originally broadcast as three separate stations - Marcher Sound began broadcasting to North East Wales and Cheshire in January 1983, MFM 97.1 (later Wirral's Buzz) served the Wirral and parts of east Flintshire since March 1989 and Marcher Coast (later Coast 96.3) broadcast to the North Wales Coast from August 1993 onwards.

These stations were owned and operated by the Marcher Radio Group until the GWR Group's purchase in 2000. Five years later, the owners merged with Capital Radio to form GCap Media (later Global Radio).

By 2008, locally produced programming had been cut back to daily four-hour breakfast shows and a regional weekday drivetime show from Wrexham for the Marcher, Coast and Wirral areas, although Coast retained an opt-out for Welsh language programming. The stations were rebranded as Heart a year later.

On 21 June 2010, Global Radio announced it would merge the stations as part of plans to reduce the Heart network of stations from 33 to 16. The new station began broadcasting on Friday 2 July 2010, leading to the closure of the Bangor studios.

The former North Wales Coast station retains an opt-out for an hour-long Welsh language music programme six days a week and early morning news bulletins in the Welsh language.

On 6 February 2014, Global announced that Heart North West & Wales would be rebranded as Capital FM, with the North Wales licence of Real Radio Wales being sold to Communicorp and relaunched as a new separate Heart station for North and Mid Wales. The rebranding to Capital took place on 6 May 2014.

On 26 February 2019, Global confirmed the station's local breakfast and weekend shows would be replaced with networked programming from April 2019. The weekday Drivetime show was retained alongside news bulletins, traffic updates and advertising. Sister station Capital Cymru, serving Anglesey and Gwynedd, retained its full schedule of local programming due to separate Welsh-language requirements.

As of 24 February 2025, Capital's regional Drivetime show was replaced by a new national show for Wales, presented by Josh Andrews and Kally Davies, broadcast from Global's Cardiff Bay studios and simulcast on Capital's three stations in Wales. The Wrexham studios were closed although local news and traffic bulletins were retained.

=== On digital radio ===
Following the relaunch of Heart NW&W as Capital in 2014, the 97.1 MHz Wirral version of the service replaced Capital Manchester on Bauer's central Liverpool DAB multiplex, the Manc service having broadcast there following the closure of MXR North West. Following the relaunch of Juice FM as Capital Liverpool at the start of 2016, that service replaced Capital Wirral on Liverpool DAB; the Wirral service is now no longer transmitted on digital radio.

Since August 2016, MuxCo's 'North East Wales and West Cheshire' multiplex - which covers a similar footprint to the Capital FM frequencies for Wrexham/Chester and Wirral combined - has carried the Wrexham/Chester 103.4 MHz FM version of Capital; this took over the slot here from Capital Liverpool, which had inherited the space on this multiplex formerly occupied by Juice FM.

The 96.3 MHz FM North Wales Coast service is transmitted on MuxCo's North West Wales DAB multiplex, which went on air at the end of 2014.

== Programming ==
All networked programming is produced and broadcast from Global's London headquarters.

National programming for Wales is produced and broadcast from Global's Cardiff Bay studios on weekdays from 4-7pm. presented by Josh Andrews and Kally Davies.

=== News ===
Global's Newsroom broadcasts hourly localised news updates from 6am-6pm on weekdays and 8am-12pm at weekends.

Local bulletins on 96.3 MHz and 103.4 MHz FM are produced and broadcast from Global's Cardiff Bay studios. Separate bulletins for the Wirral on 97.1 MHz FM are produced from Global's Manchester newsroom.
