= Radio Cardiff =

Coordinates: 51.4698°N 3.1768°W

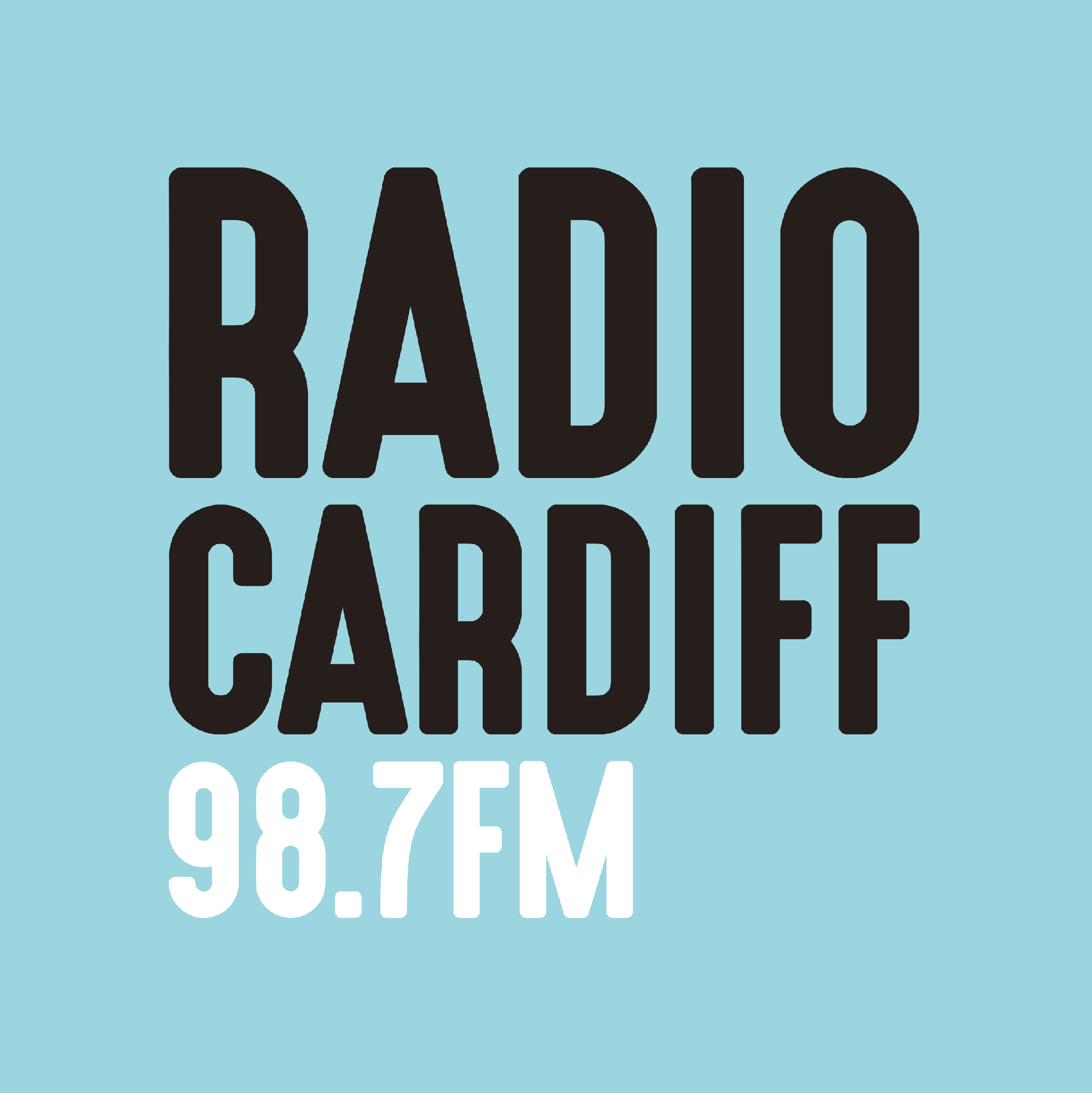
- Cardiff; Wales
- Broadcast area: Cardiff, Vale of Glamorgan
- Frequencies: 98.7 FM, DAB, Online
- Branding: Radio Cardiff 98.7FM

Programming
- Format: Community radio
- Affiliations: Community Media Association

Ownership
- Owner: Safer Wales

History
- First air date: 8 October 2007

Technical information
- Class: Community
- Repeaters: Butetown Transmitter; University Hall Transmitter

Links
- Website: Radio Cardiff

Radio Cardiff (98.7 FM) is a community radio station serving Cardiff, the capital city of Wales. It broadcasts on a terrestrial frequency of 98.7 FM; via DAB in Cardiff, Barry and Caerphilly; and streams online via their website and TuneIn. Radio Cardiff is a MOBO (music of Black origin) community station created largely by the team which ran the temporary Bay FM and Beats FM stations on a series of 28-day Restricted Service Licences (RSLs) in the 1990s and early 2000s.

The station was incorporated as Radio Cardiff Limited (RCL) on 1 November 2006 by John Lenney Jr. MBE and Ian Gallivan and launched its on-air service in October 2007. It is the only FM community radio station in the city, and has a specific remit to broadcast features of interest to the Welsh capital's diverse population.

The station's mission statement is "to deliver a diverse range of music with shows that break the mould of traditional radio".

Radio Cardiff is based at Meanwhile House with one main live studio and a second back-up studio, often used for pre-recording shows.

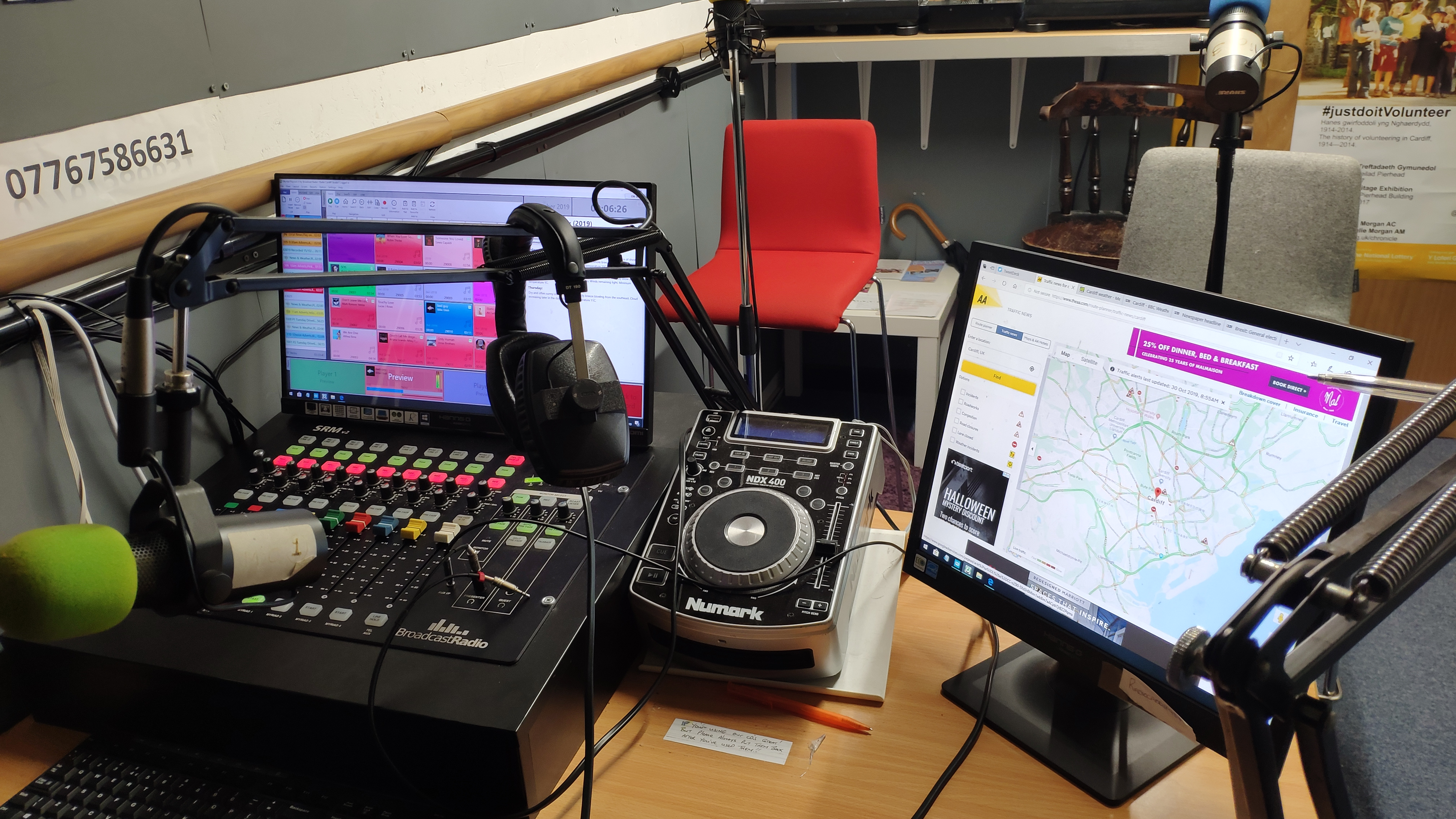
The previous main studio at Meanwhile House

== News service ==
Hourly national updates as well as weekday sports, business and entertainment updates are provided by Radio News Hub.

The station has also broadcast local news as bulletins on the half hour during daytime and as feature content in programmes.

== Programming ==
Radio Cardiff delivers programming intended to heighten cultural awareness and to spread information that is relevant to its target communities, and to offer listeners a wide variety of shows that demonstrate the station's commitment to provide a distinctive and local alternative to commercial and mainstream BBC output. Over 100 volunteers are regularly involved in creating content for the station, providing distinctive community-oriented programming which has an estimated weekly reach of 26,365.

The station showcases the rich cultural diversity of Cardiff, and provides training opportunities for members of its target audience. It broadcasts content that is popular and relevant to a local and specific audience which can often be overlooked, and it plays music that reflects the multi-cultural heritage of the city, which has one of the longest established BME communities in the UK. The cultural heritage of these communities is reflected in its station music policy, which features genres like soul, Jazz, reggae, Ska, R&B, Hiphop, and more.

As well as a wide variety of music, it produces talk-based shows cover a variety of different topics including: local history, current affairs, science among others.

Notable past and current presenters include:

- John Lenney Jr. MBE
- Scorpion
- Donna Zee
- Donna Ali

== Schedule ==
Radio Cardiff's schedule is a mix of music shows and topical programmes featuring interviews on matters of local interest.

== Governance ==
The operating licence for Radio Cardiff is held by Safer Wales.

Radio Cardiff is steered by a management committee made up of local people and broadcasters. The Head of Station now is Donna Zammit.
