= GTFM =

- Pontypridd; Wales
- Broadcast area: Rhondda Cynon Taf
- Frequencies: FM: 95.7 MHZ; 100.7 MHz; 107.1 MHz; 107.9 MHz; DAB+ across Cardiff, Rhondda and Cynon Valleys; Online; TuneIn Radio app Dedicated app for mobiles Smart speakers

Programming
- Languages: English, Welsh
- Format: Community: music and talk

Ownership
- Owner: GTFM (South Wales) Ltd.

History
- First air date: 24 May 2002

Links
- Website: GTFM

GTFM is a community radio station serving Rhondda Cynon Taf in south Wales. The station broadcasts locally on 107.9 FM in the Pontypridd, Taf Ely and lower Rhondda areas, 95.7 FM in Tonyrefail, 107.1 FM in Aberdare and 100.7 FM in Mountain Ash. The station is also available online via the station's website. GTFM also broadcasts on DAB+ across the Cardiff and Caerphilly areas and across the Rhondda and Cynon Valleys, from studios and offices on Pinewood Avenue in Rhydyfelin, near Pontypridd.

The station was started in 1999 by the local Glyntaff Tenants and Residents Association as a community project run by local enthusiasts. In partnership with the University of Glamorgan, it launched a full-time station GTFM 106.9 under an Access Radio experiment and following full evaluation was licensed as the first community radio station in Wales under Ofcom's changed rules in 2006.

The station's Ofcom license commits it to:

- 65% music, 35% speech in daytime
- 60s to present music in daytime, a range of specialist music styles in the evenings and at weekends
- Content mostly in English with some Welsh language programming
- Live broadcasting at least 12 hours a day on weekdays, 11 hours on Saturdays and 8 hours on Sundays
- All of content is produced in the station's studios except the Cardiff City Phone In which is produced at the University of South Wales

The station is also expected to provide training, encourage volunteering and deliver other social gains to the local community.

According to a local MP, Chris Bryant, GTFM is the most popular local station in the area.

== Programming ==
Most output is locally produced, including hourly local news bulletins, peak time travel updates and regular sports coverage, plus local features and interviews and specialist programming at evenings and on weekends.

The station broadcasts in Welsh three days a week, with a weekday news bulletin in Welsh that is simulcast from BBC Radio Cymru. National bulletins from Sky News Radio in London are broadcast during off-peak hours.
