= Heart North Wales Coast =

Coordinates: 53.0765°N 3.0224°W

Colwyn Bay; Wales
- Broadcast area: North Wales Coast
- Frequency: 96.3 MHz

Programming
- Format: Adult Contemporary, news, travel, Welsh language

History
- First air date: (as Marcher Coast) 27 August 1993

Coast 96.3's final logo

Heart North Wales Coast (formerly Coast 96.3 and originally Marcher Coast FM) was an independent local radio station broadcast along the North Wales coast, and owned & operated by Global Radio.

The station, which broadcast from studios in Colwyn Bay & latterly, Bangor and transmitted from Great Ormes Head, Llandudno, officially served an area stretching from Amlwch in the west to Holywell in the east, but could be heard as far away as Manchester and The Fylde.

Heart North Wales Coast, along with the nearby Heart Wrexham (formerly Marcher Sound) and Heart Cymru (Champion 103), were part of the Marcher Radio Group of radio stations, which were bought by the GWR Group (now GCap). GCap put the Marcher Group stations up for sale in 2005, but in March 2006 the sale was called off.

Coast 96.3 won a Gold Sony Award at the Sony Radio Awards 2006 for stations with a TSA of under 300,000. The first voices heard on Heart North Wales Coast were those of presenter Carl Hughes and newsreader Mair Thomas with Heart Breakfast at 6 am on Monday 22 June 2009.

On 21 June 2010, Global Radio announced plans to close Heart North Wales Coast and merge the station with Heart Cheshire and North East Wales and Heart Wirral as part of plans to reduce the Heart network of stations from 33 to 15, leading to the closure of the Bangor studios. Heart North West and Wales is broadcast from Wrexham but 96.3 FM retains an opt-out for Welsh language news bulletins and programming during early mornings. The station was rebranded as part of the Capital FM network on Tuesday 6 May 2014.

== Former presenters ==
- Al Murray
