= Heart London =

Radio station in London

Coordinates: 51.5102°N 0.1286°W

- London; United Kingdom
- Frequencies: FM: 106.2 MHz; DAB: CE Digital (London), Block 12C, 128 kbit/s Sky (UK only): 0109; TalkTalk TV: 612; Virgin Media: 918; Freeview 728; Freesat 733
- RDS: HEART

Programming
- Format: Hot AC
- Network: Heart

Ownership
- Owner: Global
- Sister stations: Capital London; LBC; LBC News; Smooth London; Radio X Gold

History
- First air date: 5 September 1995; 31 years ago

Links
- Website: www.heart.co.uk/london

Heart London is a regional radio station owned and operated by Global Radio as part of the Heart network. Across London and its neighbouring counties, it can be heard on 106.2 MHz.

== History ==
In 1994 Chrysalis Radio was awarded a London-wide licence to broadcast "soft AC" music, winning the licence as "Crystal FM".

The name was changed to Heart 106.2 which began test transmissions in August 1995, prior to the station launch on 5 September. This included live broadcasts of WPLJ from New York City.

In 1996 the Heart programming format saw the "soft AC" music replaced with a generally more neutral Hot AC playlist.

On 25 June 2007, Chrysalis Records announced that Heart along with its sister stations The Arrow, Sky News Radio, LBC and Galaxy were to be sold for £170 million to Global Radio.

On 28 April 2008, Heart London began simulcasting most of its programmes on Heart West Midlands, thereby beginning a roll-out of Heart London to other stations and by 2010, local programming was reduced to seven hours on weekdays and four hours on Saturday and Sunday. By 2019, that output was reduced to the OFCOM minimum 3 hours per weekday, with no local content on weekends.

== Current notable presenters ==
- Lindsey Russell
- Amanda Holden
- Jamie Theakston
- Ashley Roberts
- Kelly Brook
- Jason King
- Dev Griffin
- Toby Anstis
- Zoe Hardman
- Mark Wright
- Yasmin Evans
- Emma Bunton
- Lucy Horobin
- Vicky Pattison
- Scarlette Douglas
- Davina Mccall
- Olly Murs

== Availability ==
In addition to FM, the station is available on DAB digital radio in London, and across the UK on Freesat, Sky, Freeview, TalkTalk TV and Virgin Media. The station is also available on MXR regional DAB multiplexes in the North West, North East, the Severn Estuary and Yorkshire, as well as on Switch Digital in central Scotland, having replaced Heart Digital. Until April 2006, the station could also be listened to worldwide through its Internet stream. However, according to the website, the station has withdrawn this facility outside the UK due to licensing laws.

== News ==
Global's London headquarters broadcasts hourly news bulletins 24 hours a day, including local news bulletins from 0500 to 1900 on weekdays and 0600 to noon at weekends.

== See also ==
- Heart East
- Heart South
