= MXR (broadcaster) =

Former British DAB multiplex operator

MXR was an operator of regional DAB ensembles in the United Kingdom between 2001 and 2015.

== History ==
In 1999 and 2000, MXR London, a newly-formed consortium including Border Television, Chrysalis Radio and Daily Mail and General Trust, unsuccessfully applied for licences to broadcast a DAB ensemble in London which were ultimately awarded to CE Digital and Switchdigital. MXR subsequently, through multiple partnerships, including with Capital Radio Group, Chrysalis, 102.2 Jazz FM and GMG Radio, submitted applications for licences to operate regional ensembles throughout England and Wales and, following success with all of them, the ensembles started broadcasting in the early 2000s. The regional ensembles covered larger areas than local ensembles, with which they coexisted, but a smaller area than the national BBC and Digital One ensembles.

In 2000, Ford of Britain joined MXR and committed to adding DAB to audio systems in cars made from 2004.

In September 2012, MXR announced that their ensembles would stop broadcasting upon the expiration of their respective licences and the last one covering Yorkshire ceased transmissions in 2015, leaving Switchdigital's Central Scotland ensemble as the last regional multiplex in the UK.

== Multiplexes ==
=== North East England ===
MXR applied to broadcast an ensemble throughout North East England on 18 October 2000. It aired between 30 July 2001 and 29 July 2013.

=== North West England ===
MXR was given the licence to operate an ensemble in North West England in March 2001. It was broadcast between 25 September of that year and 24 September 2013.

=== South Wales and the Severn Estuary ===
MXR was given the licence to operate an ensemble covering South Wales and the Severn Estuary in January 2001. It was broadcast between 30 July of that year and 29 July 2013.

=== West Midlands ===
MXR was given the licence to broadcast in the West Midlands in February 2001 and the ensemble was active between 28 August of that year and 27 August 2013.

=== Yorkshire ===
MXR was given the licence to operate the regional ensemble covering Yorkshire in late 2002. It was broadcast between 30 June 2003 and 29 June 2015.

== See also ==
- CE Digital
- Switchdigital
