= Heart North and Mid Wales =

Welsh radio station

- Wrexham; United Kingdom
- Broadcast area: North and Mid Wales
- Frequencies: FM: Wrexham: 88.0 MHz; Welshpool: 102.8 MHz; Llandudno: 105.7 MHz; Newtown: 106 MHz; Rhyl: 106.9 MHz; Bangor : 107.2 MHz; Prestatyn: 107.3 MHz; Aberystwyth: 107.7 MHz; DAB+: 10D (North East Wales)
- RDS: HEART
- Branding: This is Heart

Programming
- Format: Hot Adult Contemporary
- Network: Heart

Ownership
- Owner: Communicorp UK
- Operator: Global
- Sister stations: Capital Cymru, Capital North West and Wales; Heart South Wales; Smooth Wales

History
- First air date: 4 January 2011

Links
- Website: Heart North and Mid Wales

Heart North and Mid Wales is a regional radio station owned by Communicorp UK and operated by Global Radio as part of the Heart network. It broadcasts to North and Mid Wales.

== History ==
In December 2008, GMG Media was awarded an FM licence to launch a new Real Radio station serving North and Mid Wales. Initially, the company pledged to produce separate local programming and news bulletins for the region in addition to off-peak pan-Wales output. Following an agreed format change request, the existing service covering south and west Wales was instead expanded to form a national service with no opt-outs. Real Radio Wales began broadcasting to the area at 8am on Tuesday 4 January 2011.

On 6 February 2014, Global Radio reached an agreement to sell the Northern licence for Real Radio Wales and seven other stations across the UK to Communicorp. The adjoining South and West Wales licence remains under Global's ownership. Under OFCOM rules, the sale required the then all-Wales station to be split into two with separate Heart stations launched under separate owners.

The new Heart North and Mid Wales station launched at 6am on Tuesday 6 May 2014. The move coincided with the rebrand and relaunch of Heart's North West and Wales and Cymru stations as part of the Capital network. The Heart and Capital stations shared facilities at Global's studios in Gwersyllt, near Wrexham.

In February 2019, following OFCOM's decision to relax local content obligations from commercial radio, Global announced it would replace Heart North and Mid Wales' local breakfast and weekend shows with networked programming from London.

As of 3 June 2019, the station's local output consists of a three-hour Drivetime show on weekdays, alongside local news bulletins, traffic updates and advertising.

As of 24 February 2025, Heart's regional Drivetime show was replaced by a new national show for Wales, presented by Simon Jagger and Chris Wood, broadcast from Global's Cardiff Bay studios and simulcast on both Heart stations in Wales. The Wrexham studios were closed although local news and traffic bulletins were retained.

=== Analogue (FM) ===
Transmitter Site	Frequency	Power	RDS Name	PI Code	Area	County
Wrexham-Rhos	88.0 MHz	1.4W	Heart	C3AA	Wrexham, Chester, and northwest Shropshire	Clwyd
Long Mountain	102.8 MHz	0.2W	Heart	C3AA	Welshpool, Oswestry	Powys and Shropshire
Llandinam	106.0 MHz	0.04W	Heart	C6A3	Powys	Mid Wales
Moel-y-Parc	106.9 MHz	0.45W	Heart	C3AA	Rhyl	Flintshire
Arfon	107.2 MHz	0.45W	Heart	C3AA	Bangor	Gwynedd
Gwaenysgor	107.3 MHz	0.07W	Heart	C3AA	Prestatyn	Clwyd
Aberystwyth	107.7 MHz	13W	Heart	C3AA	Aberystwyth	Ceredigion

=== Digital (DAB) ===
Multiplex Name	Bitrate	Short Label	Long Label	SID
MuxCo North East Wales & West Cheshire	40kbit/s	Heart	Heart N&M Wales	C2DF

On air date March 2014

== Programming ==
All networked programming originates from Global's London headquarters, including Heart Breakfast with Jamie Theakston and Amanda Holden.

Programming for both of Wales' Heart stations is produced and broadcast from Global's Cardiff Bay studios on weekdays from 4-7pm. presented by Simon Jagger and Chris Wood.

=== News ===
Global's Cardiff Bay newsroom broadcasts hourly regional news bulletins from 6am-7pm on weekdays and 6am-12pm at weekends with headlines on the half hour during weekday breakfast and drivetime shows.

National news updates air hourly from Global's London headquarters at all other times.
