= Heart South Wales =

- Cardiff; United Kingdom
- Broadcast area: South and West Wales
- Frequencies: FM: Pontypridd: 102.3 MHz; Carmarthenshire: 105.2 MHz; Abergavenny: 105.2 MHz; Cardiff: 105.4 MHz; Pembroke, Aberystwyth and Ceredigion: 105.7 MHz; Haverfordwest: 105.7 MHz; Newport: 105.9 MHz; Aberdare: 105.9 MHz; Carmarthen: 106 MHz; Swansea: 106 MHz; Ebbw Vale: 106.1 MHz; Fishguard: 106.2 MHz; Bargoed: 107.3 MHz; DAB: 12A (Swansea); 12C (South East Wales); 12D (Mid and South West Wales) RDS: Heart
- Branding: This is Heart

Programming
- Format: Hot Adult Contemporary
- Network: Heart

Ownership
- Owner: Global
- Sister stations: Capital South Wales; Smooth Wales

History
- First air date: 3 October 2000

Links
- Website: Heart South Wales

Heart South Wales is a regional radio station that broadcasts to South and West Wales from studios in Cardiff. The station is owned and operated by Global Radio and forms part of the expanded Heart radio network of stations.

== Background ==
=== Real Radio ===
On 3 October 2000 the Real Radio brand was launched after GMG Group won its first broadcast licence, serving South and West Wales. Following an introduction by Sir Tom Jones, the station's founding managing director John Myers introduced the song "A Star is Born".

In December 2008, GMG Group was awarded the corresponding North and Mid Wales licence. Following an agreed format change request with Ofcom, the existing South and West Wales service was rolled out to the new coverage area. The station began broadcasting on its North and Mid Wales frequencies on 4 January 2011.

Real Radio Wales was a music and speech station, playing an AC format of classic, contemporary and current music the past 25 years to the present day.

The station also carried news bulletins every hour between the hours of 6am and 7pm weekdays and from 6am to 2pm on Saturdays and Sundays (including half-hour headlines at breakfast and drivetime) from Cardiff. Other bulletins were provided by Sky News through IRN.

=== Heart ===
On 25 June 2012 it was announced Global Radio (the owner of stations such as Capital and Heart) had bought GMG Radio. The former GMG stations, including Real Radio, continued to operate separately until a regulatory review was carried out.

On 6 February 2014, Global Radio reached an agreement to sell the North Wales licence for Real Radio and seven other stations to Communicorp. The South Wales licence remains under Global's ownership.

Up until April 2014, the station was available across the UK on digital satellite TV (Sky Digital channel 0146), taking up the slot following the closure of Real Radio (Digital), but was replaced by The Arrow.

Under OFCOM rules, the sale required the all-Wales Real Radio station to be split into two with separate stations, launched under separate owners.

Both stations were rebranded and relaunched as Heart South Wales and Heart North and Mid Wales on Tuesday 6 May 2014. Around the time of the relaunch, the station's audience share had increased from 9.1% to 11.5% in the previous twelve months.

In February 2019, following Ofcom's decision to relax local content obligations from commercial radio, Global announced it would replace Heart Wales' local breakfast and weekend shows with networked programming from London.

As of 3 June 2019, the station's local output consists of a three-hour Drivetime show on weekdays, alongside local news bulletins, traffic updates and advertising.

From 24 February 2025, the station's weekday Drivetime show, presented by Simon Jagger and Chris Wood, will be simulcast on Heart in North and Mid Wales. Separate local news and traffic bulletins for South Wales will continue.

== Programming ==
All networked programming originates from Global's London headquarters, including Heart Breakfast, presented each weekday by Jamie Theakston and Amanda Holden.

Programming for both of Wales' Heart stations is produced and broadcast from Global's Cardiff Bay studios from 4-7pm on weekdays, presented by Simon Jagger and Chris Wood.

=== News ===
Global's Cardiff Bay newsroom broadcasts hourly regional news bulletins from 6am-7pm on weekdays and 6am-12pm at weekends with headlines on the half hour during weekday breakfast and drivetime shows.

National news updates air hourly from Global's London headquarters at all other times. The Cardiff Bay newsroom also produces bulletins for Capital South Wales and Heart North and Mid Wales (owned by Communicorp), Smooth Wales, Capital North West and Wales and Capital Cymru.
