= Arfon transmitting station =

Transmitter site in northwest Wales

Arfon
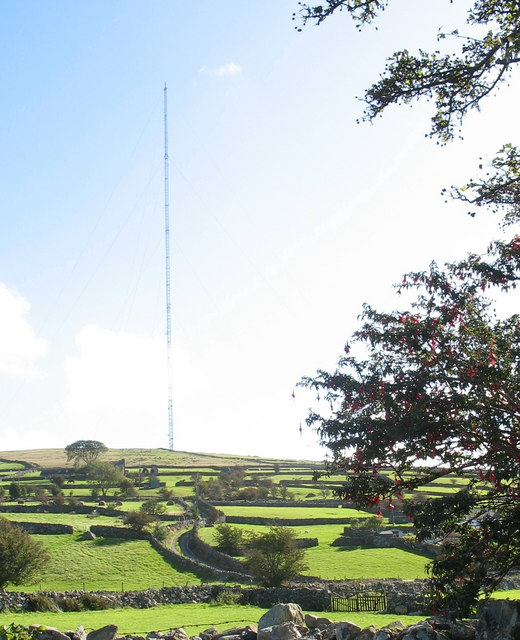

- Mast height: 317.4 m (1,041 ft)
- Coordinates: 53°01′11″N 4°16′24″W
- Grid reference: SH476493
- Built: 1962
- Relay of: Llanddona
- BBC region: BBC Wales
- ITV region: ITV Cymru Wales

The Arfon transmitting station is a facility for FM, DAB digital radio and television transmission near the villages of Nebo and Nasareth in Gwynedd, northwestern Wales (grid reference SH476493). It includes a 308.5 m (1,012 ft) guyed mast with antennas attached at various heights. The mast is surmounted by a television transmitting antenna, which brings the total height of the structure to 317.4 m (1,041 ft), making it the tallest structure in Wales. It is owned and operated by Arqiva.

== History ==
The station was built by the ITA in the early 1960s to provide a 405-line ITV Band III (VHF) TV service for north west Wales. Unlike the BBC, which served the area from Llanddona (on the island of Anglesey), Arfon gave better coverage to some areas. The tower was completed in 1962 and began broadcasting on 9 November of that year.

In October 1975 the site became a medium power UHF analogue colour television relay of Llanddona, at the time carrying BBC One, BBC Two and ITV. S4C was added in 1982.

405-line TV was finally discontinued in the UK in 1985, but it appears that Arfon's VHF transmitters were decommissioned a year early in 1984 and the transmitters themselves were reused for clinical radiotherapy.

More recently, Police and Ambulance communications have been added, in addition to mobile (cellular) telephone antennas. In 1993, Classic FM began using the site for FM coverage of north west Wales in preference to Llanddona (the BBC's regional FM site), partly due to a dispute over BBC charges for sharing fees of its transmitter masts and antennas, but more because Arfon, in conjunction with Great Orme's Head (near Llandudno) gave Classic FM better coverage than the BBC sites.

On 16 November 1998, local commercial radio station Champion 103 launched from studios in Bangor with its transmitter at Arfon.

The mast had its aircraft warning lights replaced in Summer 2006 to red lamps employing arrays of ultrabright LEDs.

On 18 July 2006, national digital radio network Digital One began broadcasting from the station.

== Coverage area ==
The primary television service area includes most of Anglesey and central parts of the Llŷn Peninsula, however many viewers in Ireland especially in south Dublin and north County Wicklow can also receive Arfon's broadcasts. The radio service area is slightly larger, reaching further down Cardigan Bay towards Tonfanau near Tywyn.

== Channels listed by frequency ==
=== Analogue television ===
==== 9 November 1962 – October 1975 ====
Initially, Arfon was a relay of Preseli, receiving its 405-line VHF transmission off-air on channel 8 and rebroadcasting it on channel 10.

Frequency	VHF	kW	Service
199.75 MHz	10	10	HTV Wales (Teledu Cymru until 1968)

==== October 1975 – 1 November 1982 ====
With the coming of colour TV on 625 lines, Arfon acted as a relay of Llanddona, whilst continuing to relay Preseli's VHF transmission.

Frequency	VHF	UHF	kW	Service
199.75 MHz	10	—	10	HTV Wales
631.25 MHz	—	41	3.6	HTV Wales
655.25 MHz	—	44	3.6	BBC2 Wales
711.25 MHz	—	51	3.6	BBC1 Wales

==== 1 November 1982 – January 1984 ====
1982 saw the rollout of the UK's 4th planned UHF television channel. As with all Welsh transmitters, Arfon was required to carry S4C instead of Channel 4 which is broadcast to the rest of the United Kingdom.

Frequency	VHF	UHF	kW	Service
199.75 MHz	10	—	10	HTV Wales
631.25 MHz	—	41	3.6	HTV Wales
655.25 MHz	—	44	3.6	BBC2 Wales
679.25 MHz	—	47	3.6	S4C
711.25 MHz	—	51	3.6	BBC1 Wales

==== January 1984 – 21 October 2009 ====
After 22 years of VHF television from this site, the service was discontinued in January 1984. On UHF, Arfon was destined only ever to transmit the originally-planned four of the eventual five analogue terrestrial television channels.

Frequency	UHF	kW	Service
631.25 MHz	41	3.6	ITV1 Wales (HTV Wales until 2002)
655.25 MHz	44	3.6	BBC Two Wales
679.25 MHz	47	3.6	S4C
711.25 MHz	51	3.6	BBC One Wales

=== Analogue and digital television ===
==== 21 October 2009 – 18 November 2009 ====
There never was a pre-DSO digital TV service from Arfon.

DSO for the repeaters of Llanddona occurred between 21 October & 18 November 2009. In preparation for this, the transmitting antenna at the top of the Arfon mast was replaced in March 2008. This new antenna is slightly taller than the previous one, resulting in the mast's total height increasing to 317.4 metres (1,041 ft) from its previous height of 313.9 metres (1,030 ft).

On 21 October, BBC2 Analogue was switched off, and ITV1 Wales took over its frequency for its final three weeks of service. BBC Mux A took over channel 41 that had just been vacated by ITV.

Frequency	UHF	kW	Service	System
634.166 MHz	41+	2	BBC A	DVB-T
655.25 MHz	44	3.6	ITV1 Wales	PAL System I
679.25 MHz	47	3.6	S4C	PAL System I
711.25 MHz	51	3.6	BBC One Wales	PAL System I

=== Digital television ===
==== 18 November 2009 – present ====
The analogue television transmissions from Arfon ceased and were replaced by digital transmissions. Unusually for the UK, the digital transmissions from this site are considerably more powerful than is usual practice considering the ERP of the analogue services that they replace.

Frequency	UHF	kW	Operator
634.166 MHz	41+	2	BBC A
658.000 MHz	44	2	Digital 3&4
682.000 MHz	47	2	BBC B

=== Analogue radio (FM VHF) ===
Frequency	kW	Service
100.7 MHz	3.75 (H); 15 (V)	Classic FM
103.0 MHz	2.5	Capital Cymru
107.2 MHz	2.5	Heart North and Mid Wales

=== Digital radio (DAB) ===
Frequency	Block	kW	Operator
215.072 MHz	10D	—	MuxCo North West Wales†
222.064 MHz	11D	1.9	Digital One
225.648 MHz	12B	4	BBC National DAB

† MuxCo North west Wales is on this transmitter carrying both the Welsh language Capital Cymru and the English Capital North West & Wales. Also carries Smooth Radio, Nation Radio Wales and Dragon Radio.

== See also ==
- Category:Transmitter sites in the United Kingdom
- List of masts
- List of tallest buildings and structures in Great Britain
- List of radio stations in the United Kingdom
