= Timeline of independent radio in the United Kingdom =

This is a timeline of the development of independent radio in the UK. The timeline focuses on commercial stations which broadcast on FM and MW.

== 1960s ==
- 1969
  - 30 April – University Radio York (URY) starts broadcasting and becomes the first licensed independent radio station in the UK.

== 1970s ==
- 1970
  - Until the 1970 United Kingdom general election, despite the popularity of Radio Luxembourg and, for a period in the mid-1960s, the off-shore "pirate" broadcasters, it had remained the policy of both major political parties that radio was to remain under the BBC. Upon the election of Edward Heath's government this policy changed. The new Minister of Post and Telecommunications and former ITN newscaster, Christopher Chataway, announces a bill to allow for the introduction of commercial radio in the United Kingdom. This service would be planned and regulated and would compete with BBC Local Radio services.
  - 1 September – United Biscuits launches its own radio station United Biscuits Network which is broadcast round the clock to the company's four factories.
- 1971
  - No events.
- 1972
  - 12 July – Following the enabling of The Sound Broadcasting Act 1972, The Independent Broadcasting Authority is formed. This new body is to be the regulator for commercial radio and it paves the way for the launch of Independent Local Radio.
- 1973
  - 8 October –
    - LBC becomes the first legal Independent Local Radio station in the United Kingdom when it begins broadcasting at just before 6 am, providing talk radio to the London area.
    - At 6 am, the very first Independent Radio News bulletin is broadcast.
  - 16 October – Capital Radio begins broadcasting a music-based general entertainment service to the London area.
  - 31 December – Radio Clyde, the first independent local radio station outside London, and the first in Scotland, begins broadcasting to the Glasgow area.
- 1974
  - 19 February – BRMB begins broadcasting to the Birmingham area.
  - 2 April – Piccadilly Radio begins broadcasting to the Manchester area.
  - 15 July – Metro Radio begins broadcasting to the Newcastle upon Tyne area.
  - 30 September – Swansea Sound, the first Independent Local Radio station in Wales, begins broadcasting to the Swansea area.
  - 1 October – Radio Hallam begins broadcasting to the Sheffield area.
  - 21 October – Radio City begins broadcasting to the Liverpool area on MW only.
- 1975
  - 22 January – Radio Forth begins broadcasting to the Edinburgh area.
  - 8 February – Radio City begins broadcasting to the Liverpool area on VHF.
  - 19 May – Plymouth Sound begins broadcasting to the Plymouth area.
  - 24 June – Radio Tees begins broadcasting to the Teesside area.
  - 3 July – Radio Trent beings broadcasting to the Nottingham area.
  - 16 September – Pennine Radio begins broadcasting to Bradford.
  - 14 October – Radio Victory begins broadcasting to the Portsmouth area.
  - 28 October – Radio Orwell begins broadcasting to the Ipswich area.
- 1976
  - 8 March – Radio 210 begins broadcasting to the Reading area.
  - 16 March – Independent Local Radio begins in Northern Ireland when Downtown Radio starts broadcasting.
  - 12 April – Beacon Radio, broadcasting to the Wolverhampton area, is the final station in the first wave of Independent Local Radio stations to begin transmission.
  - December – Capital Radio launches the Capital Radio Helpline, and also in 1976 Capital Radio launches the Flying Eye, a traffic spotting light aircraft which reported on traffic congestion on the streets of Central London.
- 1977
  - No events.
- 1978
  - No events.
- 1979
  - 16 December – United Biscuits Network closes after nine years on air.

== 1980s ==
- 1980
  - 11 April – CBC in Cardiff becomes the first of the second tranche of Independent Local Radio stations to start broadcasting. It is the first new ILR station since 1976.
  - 23 May – Mercia Sound begins broadcasting to Coventry and the surrounding area.
  - 10 July – Hereward Radio begins broadcasting to the Peterborough area.
  - 15 September – 2CR (Two Counties Radio) begins broadcasting to the Bournemouth and New Forest area.
  - 17 October – Radio Tay begins broadcasting to the Dundee area and on 14 November the station starts broadcasting to the Perth area.
  - 23 October – Severn Sound begins broadcast to Gloucestershire.
  - 7 November – DevonAir Radio begins broadcasting to Exeter and the surrounding mid-Devon area. On 12 December the station starts broadcasting to the Torbay area.
- 1981
  - 27 July – Northsound Radio begins broadcasting to the Aberdeen area.
  - 1 September – Radio Aire begins broadcasting to Leeds and Wakefield.
  - 7 September – Centre Radio begins broadcasting to Leicester.
  - 12 September – Essex Radio begins broadcasting to the Southend-on-Sea area of Essex.
  - 15 October – Chiltern Radio begins broadcasting to the Luton area.
  - 16 October – West Sound Radio begins broadcasting to Ayr and the surrounding area.
  - 27 October – Radio West begins broadcasting to Bristol.
  - 10 December – Essex Radio expands into mid-Essex when it starts broadcasting from transmitters located near Chelmsford.
- 1982
  - 23 February – Moray Firth Radio begins broadcasting to Inverness and the surrounding area of north east Scotland.
  - 1 March – Chiltern Radio's broadcast area expands when it begins broadcasting to the Bedford area.
  - April – At the start of the Falklands War, Radio Victory begins 24-hour broadcasting.
  - 4 October – Radio Wyvern begins broadcasting across Herefordshire and Worcestershire.
  - 5 October – Red Rose Radio begins broadcasting to the Preston and Blackpool areas of west Lancashire.
  - 12 October – Wiltshire Radio begins broadcasting to Swindon and West Wiltshire.
  - 6 November – Saxon Radio begins broadcasting to the Bury St. Edmunds area. This is the first station to network most of its output from another, in this case, Radio Orwell in Ipswich.
- 1983
  - 4 April – County Sound begins broadcasting to the Guildford area.
  - 13 June – Gwent Broadcasting becomes the first station in the UK to occupy the newly released 102.2 to 104.5Mhz part of the VHF/FM waveband.
  - 29 August – Southern Sound begins broadcasting to the Brighton area.
  - 5 September – Signal Radio begins broadcasting to the Stoke-on-Trent area at 6am and Marcher Sound begins broadcasting to the Wrexham area at 6.30am.
  - 6 October – Centre Radio stops broadcasting after running into financial difficulties. A take-over bid was rejected by the IBA and the station went off air at 5.30pm.
  - Plans for a station in the Derry region of Northern Ireland collapse.
- 1984
  - 17 April – Viking Radio begins broadcasting across Humberside.
  - August – Radio Forth becomes the first Independent Local Radio station to broadcast a part-time split service. It is Festival City Radio, which provides coverage of the 1984 Edinburgh Festival on MW, while Radio Forth continues on FM.
  - 7 September – Commercial radio returns to Leicester, eleven months after Centre Radio went off air. The new service is provided by Leicester Sound.
  - 30 September – The first edition of The Network Chart Show is broadcast. Aired on almost all of the UK's Independent Local Radio network, the programme is presented from the studios of Capital Radio by David Jensen.
  - 1 October – Three stations go on air – Invicta Sound begins broadcasting across Kent from Whitstable, Radio Broadland begins broadcasting to Norwich and Hereward Radio begins broadcasting to Northampton.
  - 20 October – Radio Mercury begins broadcasting to the Crawley area.
  - 4 December – Pennine Radio's broadcast area is expanded when the Bradford-based station starts broadcasting to Huddersfield and Halifax.
- 1985
  - 24 April – Financial difficulties force South Wales station Gwent Broadcasting to close down after less than two years on air. Its frequencies were later given over to a sustaining service provided by neighbouring station CBC in Cardiff, with which it was trying to merge.
  - 1 May – Invicta Sound is rebranded as Invicta Radio.
  - 9 September – Radio West closes down after Wiltshire Radio buys struggling Radio West and on 1 October a merged station, GWR, launches to Bristol and Swindon / West Wiltshire with shared (networked) and split local programming.
  - 1 October – Radio Hallam's broadcast area is expanded when the Sheffield-based station starts broadcasting across all of South Yorkshire.
  - 14 October – CBC is relaunched as Red Dragon Radio. The station also covers the Newport area, offering a replacement service to Gwent Broadcasting and provides separate breakfast shows for Cardiff and Newport until the early 1990s.
  - October – Plymouth Sound launches an opt-out service for Tavistock. The service operates on weekday breakfast and drive time and weekend mid-mornings.
  - Unknown – Due to general difficulties within the commercial radio industry, Hereward Radio withdraws from Northamptonshire and the Independent Broadcasting Authority assigns the Independent Local Radio franchise to a new company, Northants Radio Ltd, owned by Chiltern Radio Group.
- 1986
  - The Home Office sanctions six experiments of split programming on Independent Local Radio. Up to ten hours a week of split programming was allowed. These include Welsh language programmes on Marcher Sound, Asian programming on Leicester Sound and rugby league commentary on Viking Radio.
  - A European-wide re-organisation of band 2 of the VHF band comes into effect in July 1987. In preparation for this, 1986 sees many local stations change their VHF/FM frequency.
  - 28 June – Portsmouth station Radio Victory goes off air. It was the first commercial radio station to lose its licence.
  - 12 October – Ocean Sound begins broadcasting. Replacing Radio Victory in East Hampshire, it introducing commercial radio to Southampton, Winchester and the Isle of Wight. The station transmits with split frequencies; Ocean Sound West on 103.2FM and 1557AM and Ocean Sound East on 97.5FM (former 95FM transmitter for Radio Victory) and 1170AM, the former AM transmitter of the former ILR station.
  - 30 November – Following its purchase of Northants 96, Chiltern Radio launches a networked service called "The Hot FM". The service is broadcast on three ILR licenses including the newly launched Northants 96. Only the mid-morning show is broadcast locally.
- 1987
  - 1 January – A new transmitter for Radio 210 is switched on, allowing the Reading-based station to broadcast across Berkshire and north Hampshire.
  - 3 March – Radio Trent's broadcast area expands when it starts broadcasting to the Derby area.
  - 18 May – The Yorkshire Radio Network launches. It is a networked service of evening and overnight programming, broadcast on three commercial radio stations in Yorkshire – Pennine Radio in Bradford, Viking Radio in Hull and Radio Hallam in Sheffield – providing programming every night between 8 pm, starting slightly earlier at weekends, and 6 am.
  - 22 May – GWR's broadcast area expands when it launches in Bath.
  - 14 July – Beacon Radio's broadcast area expands when it launches in Shropshire.
  - 6 December – Ocean Sound launches a third station Ocean Sound North. It covers Winchester and the north of its region. It shares much of its programming with Ocean Sound West, except for a local breakfast show.
- 1988
  - January – Radio Tees is relaunched as TFM.
  - 1 June – County Sound becomes the first station to introduce full-time split programming on FM and AM. County Sound Premier Radio on FM and County Sound Gold on AM.
  - 7 June – County Sound Gold was rebranded as First Gold Radio.
  - 1 July – The Superstation launches an overnight sustaining service on a number of ILR stations around the country at 10pm. The service would run until 6am each morning, later expanding to start at 7pm.
  - 2 July – Capital Gold starts broadcasting, initially as a weekend only service on AM.
  - 12 August – Radio Clyde split their FM and AM services at the weekends to Radio Clyde 261 on AM and Clyde FM on FM.
  - 3 September – Key 103 and Piccadilly Gold launch in Manchester, replacing Piccadilly Radio.
  - 20 September – The Radio Data System (RDS) launches, allowing car radios to automatically retune, display station identifiers and switch to local travel news.
  - 4 October – Launch of GEM-AM, the result of a split between Radio Trent and Leicester Sound's FM and medium wave frequencies.
  - 31 October – Viking Radio is replaced on FM by Viking FM and on MW by Viking Gold.
  - 15 November – Brunel Classic Gold launches on MW across the west of England.
  - 1 November – Capital Gold begins broadcasting full-time on MW across London and the FM service is renamed as 95.8 Capital FM.
  - November – Supergold begins broadcasting on MW across Northamptonshire and Bedfordshire.
  - 4 December – Ocean Sound creates three new radio stations as part of the relaxing of ILR licensing rules. Power FM launches in Southampton and becomes the UK's first 24-hour non-stop chart hit music station, The Light FM launches in Winchester and The Gold AM replaces Ocean Sound on medium-wave. Ocean Sound continues its full service operation on 97.5 FM in Portsmouth.
- 1989
  - 15 January – Wolverhampton station Beacon Radio is replaced on FM by Beacon FM and on MW by WABC.
  - 12 February – CNFM begins broadcasting to Cambridge and Newmarket.
  - 27 March – Kent station Invicta Radio is replaced on FM by Invicta FM and on MW by Coast AM.
  - 31 March –
    - MFM 97.1 begins broadcasting to the Wirral area.
    - Marcher Gold begins broadcasting on MW to Wrexham and Chester and the area's FM station is renamed MFM.
  - 4 April – Xtra AM begins broadcasting on the MW frequencies of BRMB and Mercia Sound.
  - 8 April – Great North Radio begins broadcasting on MW to north east England.
  - 1 May – Classic Gold begins broadcasting on MW across west, south and east Yorkshire, replacing individual stations Pennine AM, Hallam AM and Viking Gold.
  - 4 July – A new transmitter for DevonAir is switched on allowing the station to expand its transmission area to East Devon, West Dorset and South Somerset. The relay broadcasts under the name of South West 103.
  - 16 July – The Breeze begins broadcasting on MW across Essex and Surrey.
  - 15 September – Fox FM starts broadcasting to Oxford and Banbury. It becomes the first UK commercial station to be licensed to broadcast on a single waveband.
  - 2 October – LBC ends and is replaced on FM by news and comment station LBC Crown FM
  - 15 October – Horizon Radio starts broadcasting to Milton Keynes.
  - 22 October – The first of the Independent Broadcasting Authority's series of incremental radio stations launches when Sunset 102 begins broadcasting to Manchester. More than 20 licenses were issued, which allowed new stations to start broadcasting in areas already served by independent local radio. The stations came on air in 1989 and 1990.
  - 5 November – Sunrise Radio begins broadcasting to west London's Asian community on MW.
  - 13 November – London Greek Radio and WNK begin broadcasting. They are the first stations to share a frequency and they alternate every four hours.
  - 26 November – Orchard FM begins broadcasting to Yeovil, Taunton and the surrounding area.
  - 9 December – Asian radio station Sunrise Radio Yorkshire begins broadcasting in Bradford.
  - Unknown – Liverpool station City Talk 1548 AM becomes the UK's first all-talk radio station outside of London.This was unusual as most stations launched 'golden oldie' stations on their AM frequencies.
  - Unknown – Southern Sound's broadcast area is expanded when it begins broadcasting to East Sussex.

== 1990s ==
- 1990
  - 1 January – Delta Radio launches using one of the previously County Sound Premier transmitters.
  - 3 January – Glasgow station Radio Clyde is replaced by Clyde 1 on FM and Clyde 2 on MW in Glasgow.
  - 22 January – Radio Borders begins broadcasting across the Scottish Border region.
  - 7 February – Cool FM begins broadcasting to Belfast on FM. Downtown Radio continues on MW in Belfast and on FM across Northern Ireland.
  - 17 February – KFM begins broadcasting to Stockport.
  - 4 March – London's Jazz FM, a station playing mainly soul and jazz music, launches with an Ella Fitzgerald concert at the Royal Albert Hall.
  - 18 March – Radio Thamesmead begins broadcasting to the Thamesmead area of London.
  - 31 March – Choice FM begins broadcasting to the Brixton area of London.
  - 6 April –
    - KCBC begins broadcasting to Kettering and Corby.
    - Belfast Community Radio launches.
  - 15 April – Isle of Wight Radio begins broadcasting.
  - 21 April – FTP begins broadcasting to Bristol.
  - 14 May – Buzz FM begins broadcasting to Birmingham.
  - 21 May – South West Sound begins broadcasting across Dumfries and Galloway.
  - 1 June – Red Rose Radio is split into two stations – Red Rose Rock FM using the FM frequency and Red Rose Gold on the medium wave frequency.
  - 4 June –
    - Centre Sound begins broadcasting to Stirling.
    - CityBeat begins broadcasting to Belfast.
  - 24 June – Chiltern Supergold begins broadcasting on the MW frequencies of Chiltern Radio.
  - 25 June –
    - Airport Information Radio begins broadcasting, providing a travel news service to Heathrow and Gatwick airports.
    - Spectrum Radio begins broadcasting. The station provides airtime to various ethnic communities across London.
  - 9 July – Melody 105.4 FM begins broadcasting an easy listening melodic music service across London.
  - 15 July –
    - Edinburgh station Radio Forth is replaced on FM by Radio Forth RFM and on MW by Max AM.
    - Touch AM begins broadcasting in South Wales.
  - 17 July – Leeds station Radio Aire is replaced on FM by Aire FM and on MW by Magic 828.
  - 28 August – Radio Harmony begins broadcasting in Coventry.
  - 1 September – Official launch of dance music station Kiss FM. The station had previously operated as a pirate broadcaster but now broadcasts legally across London..
  - 6 October – The Superstation closes after 2 years 3 months on air at 6am after going into liquidation.
  - 7 October – Mellow 1557 begins broadcasting to the Tendring area of Essex.
  - 8 October – Severn Sound splits into two services, with Severn Sound continuing on FM with 3 Counties Radio launching on MW.
  - October – Echo 96 begins broadcasting to South Cheshire and Staffordshire.
  - 5 November – Wear FM begins broadcasting to Sunderland.
  - 26 November – Centre Sound relaunches as Central FM.
  - 30 December – WABC begins broadcasting to Shropshire.
- 1991
  - 1 January – The Radio Authority comes into being, replacing the Independent Broadcasting Authority as the UK's radio regulator.
  - 27 January – Galaxy Radio replaces FTP in Bristol. This station would be part of Chiltern Radio's Hot FM network, with separate programmes during the day and taking the main network output from Milton Keynes between 2200 and 0600 overnight.
  - 10 March – South Coast Radio launches on MW along the Sussex and Hampshire coast.
  - March – After two years on air, Radio City closes its MW talk station City Talk 1548 AM and replaces it with Radio City Gold.
  - June – Airport Information Radio closes after just a year on air.
  - 5 July – Chiltern Radio launches Network News.
  - July – The Radio Authority awards the first Independent National Radio licence to Showtime Radio, which proposes a 'songs from the shows' format. The rules, as set out by the Broadcasting Act 1990, stated that the authority had to give the licence to the highest cash bidder, providing that the applicant met criteria set down in the Broadcasting Act and Showtime offered the highest amount out of the three applicants.
  - August – The Radio Authority re-awards the first Independent National Radio licence to Classic FM because Showtime has been unable to secure the required funding within the required time as stipulated by the Authority.
  - 31 August – The Pulse of West Yorkshire replaces Pennine FM in Bradford, Halifax and Huddersfield.
  - 16 September – Signal buys neighbouring KFM and merges the station with Echo 96 resulting in the launch of Signal Cheshire.
  - 19 October – SIBC begins broadcasting to the Shetland Islands.
- 1992
  - 15 February – Radio Orwell changes its name to SGR FM following the purchase of the station by East Anglian Radio.
  - 1 March – Lincs FM beings broadcasting to Lincolnshire.
  - 14 March – Heartland FM begins broadcasting to the Scottish towns of Pitlochry and Aberfeldy.
  - 3 April – Pirate FM begins broadcasting across Cornwall.
  - 14 April – Peterborough station Hereward Radio is replaced on FM by Hereward FM and on MW by The Worlds Greatest Music Station.
  - April – The Radio Authority awards the second Independent National Radio licence to Independent Music Radio, a consortium jointly owned by TV-am and Virgin Communications Ltd. The Authority had hoped that the station would launch by the end of the year but it didn't launch until the following April.
  - 4 May – Mercury 96.4 begins broadcasting to Guildford.
  - 25 May – Radio Wave 96.5 begins broadcasting to Blackpool.
  - 1 July – KL.FM 96.7 begins broadcasting to King's Lynn and West Norfolk.
  - 4 July – Minster FM begins broadcasting to York and the surrounding areas of mid North Yorkshire.
  - July – As Classic FM prepares to launch, test transmissions are carried out using a recording of birdsong originally made for a Raymond Briggs play about nuclear war in 1991. The recording proves popular with listeners and is later launched as Birdsong Radio.
  - 1 September – Q96 begins broadcasting to Paisley in Renfrewshire.
  - 5 September – Spire FM begins broadcasting to Salisbury and the surrounding area.
  - 7 September – Britain's first national commercial radio station, Classic FM launches at 6am.
  - 1 October – Sunshine 855 begins broadcasting on MW to the Ludlow area. The frequency had previously been used by BBC Radio Shropshire.
  - 15 October – Island FM begins broadcasting to the Channel Islands of Guernsey and Alderney.
  - 18 October – After previously enjoying success as a pirate radio station, Sunshine 855 in Shropshire officially goes on air.
  - 19 October – Lantern FM starts broadcasting to the Barnstaple and Ilfracombe areas of north west Devon.
  - 25 October – Channel 103 begins broadcasting to the Channel Island of Jersey.
  - 22 November – Delta Radio's new owners close the station after 2 years, and the transmitter is goes back to being a relay of Radio Mercury. Meanwhile, Wey Valley Radio launches in a different frequency.
  - 14 December – Radio Ceredigion begins broadcasting to Aberystwyth and the West Wales Coast.
- 1993
  - 18 January – Signal Gold launches as a full-time station on Signal Radio's MW frequency although a limited split service had been operating for the past year in the form of a separate MW-only Golden Breakfast Show.
  - 1 March – The Bay begins broadcasting to southern Cumbria and north Lancashire.
  - 14 April – CFM begins broadcasting to Carlisle.
  - 30 April – Virgin 1215, Britain's second national commercial radio station broadcasting on Radio 3's old mediumwave frequency, is launched by owner Richard Branson at 12.15pm.
  - 1 May – Ten 17 begins broadcasting to Harlow in Essex.
  - 21 May – Star FM begins broadcasting to the Berkshire towns of Slough, Maidenhead and Windsor.
  - May – Country Music Radio begins broadcasting a country music service on satellite and cable.
  - 1 July – Radio Maldwyn begins broadcasting on AM to the Montgomeryshire area of Wales.
  - 25 July – The last Network Chart Show goes out on Independent Local Radio.
  - July – Midland Radio Plc, which owns several stations, including BRMB, is acquired by GWR Group.
  - 1 August – 'Doctor' Neil Fox introduces the first Pepsi Chart, a Sunday afternoon Top 40 Countdown show for commercial radio, and based on single sales and airplay.
  - 27 August – Marcher Coast begins broadcasting. The station covers the north Wales coastal area from Llandudno eastwards.
  - 3 September – The Radio Authority announces that it will not be renewing LBC's licence. The new licensee is to be London News Radio, a consortium led by former LBC staff and backed by Guinness Mahon.
  - 4 September – Wessex FM begins broadcasting across central and western Dorset.
  - 7 October – Yorkshire Coast Radio begins broadcasting to the North Yorkshire coastal towns of Scarborough and Whitby.
  - 17 October – SGR Colchester begins broadcasting to the Colchester area.
  - 21 October – Q102.9 begins broadcasting to the Derry area of Northern Ireland.
  - October – Manchester station Sunset 102 goes into liquidation.
  - 30 October – Radio Rovers launches, and therefore becomes the first dedicated football club radio station in the United Kingdom. The station provides matchday coverage for all of Blackburn Rovers FC's home games.
  - Unknown – London station WNK closes. WNK's closure allows London Greek Radio, with whom it had shared a frequency, to begin full-time broadcasts.
  - Unknown – Sunrise Radio starts to broadcast across London when it begins transmission on the MW frequency previously occupied by BBC GLR.
- 1994
  - 5 March – Following the purchase by GWR of Mercia FM, Trent FM and Leicester Sound, Radio Trent's Derbyshire service is renamed Ram FM and two days later Xtra AM in Coventry is replaced by a Mercia-branded relay of Classic Gold.
  - 7 March – Manchester United launches its own radio station Manchester United Radio. The station operates on home match days.
  - 15 April – Mix 96 begins broadcasting to Aylesbury.
  - 6 June – NECR begins broadcasting to Inverurie and the surrounding areas of Aberdeenshire.
  - 20 June – Fortune 1458 launches in Manchester. The station uses BBC Radio Manchester's old MW frequency.
  - June – Following the purchase of Cambridge station CNFM by GWR, the station is relaunched as Q103.
  - 4 July – 97.2 Stray FM begins broadcasting to the Harrogate and Ripon areas of North Yorkshire.
  - 1 August – Nevis Radio begins broadcasting to the Fort William area.
  - 1–16 September – The UK's first five regional commercial stations start broadcasting. They are 100.4 Jazz FM (north west England), 100–102 Century Radio (north east England), Galaxy 101 which launches a dance music service on the 4th to the Severn estuary area, 100.7 Heart FM which launches on the 6th and covers the West Midlands and Scot FM which broadcasts music and speech to the Scottish central belt.
  - 1 September – Country 1035 begins broadcasting a country music service on MW to London.
  - 5 October – News Direct 97.3FM and London News Talk 1152AM begin broadcasting. They replace LBC Newstalk and London Talkback Radio. The change occurs following last year's decision by the Radio Authority not to renew LBC's licence, instead giving it to London News Radio, a consortium led by former LBC staff and backed by Guinness Mahon.
  - 16 October – Kiss 102 begins broadcasting a dance music service to Manchester.
  - 22 October – Oasis Radio begins broadcasting to Watford.
  - 31 December – This is the final day on air for DevonAir and Buzz FM. The stations lost their licenses to Gemini Radio and Choice FM respectively.
- 1995
  - 1 January – Gemini Radio and Choice FM's first day on air.
  - 9 January –
    - Two Scottish stations do the splits when Tay AM and Tay FM and Northsound One and Northsound Two begin broadcasting.
  - 14 January – Coventry station Radio Harmony is rebranded as Kix 96 and changes frequency.
  - 14 February – Talk Radio UK becomes the last of three national commercial radio stations to go on air. It broadcasts on the old Radio 1 mediumwave frequency.
  - 10 April – Virgin Radio starts broadcasting on FM in London. The station is a full simulcast of the national service apart from a 45-minute weekday early evening programme.
  - 30 May – Radio XL begins broadcasting to the Asian community of the West Midlands. The frequency was previously used by BBC Radio WM.
  - 10 June – Premier Christian Radio becomes the UK's first Christian radio station when it launches on AM across London.
  - 25 June – Vale FM begins broadcasting to the Shaftesbury area of Dorset.
  - 3 July – Viva 963 becomes the UK's first female-orientated radio station when it starts broadcasting on AM across London.
  - 8 July – KFM begins broadcasting to the towns of Sevenoaks, Tonbridge, Royal Tunbridge Wells, Dartford, Gravesend and the surrounding areas of South East of England.
  - July – The Radio Authority gives permission to GWR Group to begin programme networking across many of its FM stations. This landmark ruling begins the move by commercial radio companies in the UK to replace locally produced shows with networking.
  - 17 August – London Turkish Radio begins broadcasting.
  - 5 September – Heart 106.2 begins broadcasting an adult contemporary music service across London.
  - 9 September – Sabras Sound begins broadcasting to Leicester's Asian community on AM. It replaces Sunrise East Midlands.
  - 24 September – Amber Radio launches on MW across East Anglia.
  - 30 September –
    - CFM West Cumbria begins broadcasting to the Cumbrian towns of Workington and Whitehaven.
    - Sound Wave begins broadcasting on FM in Swansea. Swansea Sound continues on AM.
  - 30 November – 103.2 Alpha Radio begins broadcasting to the Darlington area.
- 1996
  - 5 February – Radio Wyvern becomes the last commercial station in England to end simulcasting on FM and AM.
  - 1 April – Network News closes.
  - 4 April – Guildford station 96.4 The Eagle replaces Mercury 96.4.
  - 21 April – Spirit FM begins broadcasting to the Sussex coastal towns of Chichester, Bognor Regis and Littlehampton.
  - 24 May – FM102 The Bear begins broadcasting to Stratford-upon-Avon.
  - 3 June – Asian Sound Radio begins broadcasting on MW across East Lancashire.
  - 1 July – The LBC name returns to London's airwaves following a rebrand of London News Radio's MW station News Talk 1152.
  - July – The Radio Authority receives 25 bids for the final FM citywide London licence. XFM is chosen as the winner.
  - 15 July – Oban FM begins broadcasting to the Oban area of west Scotland.
  - 2 September – Supergold closes after eight years on air, replaced by Classic Gold at 7am. Classic Gold was based at Chiltern Radio studios in Dunstable from this point.
  - 9 September – Following a change in ownership, Manchester station Fortune 1458 is renamed Lite AM.
  - September – The Radio Authority awards a full-time commercial licence to a student radio station for the first time when it awards the Oxford licence to Oxygen FM.
  - 29 September – 103.4 The Beach begins broadcasting to the coastal towns of Lowestoft and Great Yarmouth.
  - 23 November – Valleys Radio begins broadcasting on MW to the South Wales valleys.
  - Unknown – Hallam FM switches off its transmitter covering Rotherham as part of its licence agreement.
  - Unknown – Following its purchase of Bedford station Chiltern 96.9, new owners GWR Group rebrand the station as B97 FM.
  - Unknown – Delta FM returns after UKRD won the Guildford licence from Allied Radio the previous year.
- 1997
  - January – Leicester Sound moves frequency (from 103.2 to 105.4) and increases transmitter power to allow the station to cover the county of Leicestershire.
  - 6 January – West FM begins broadcasting on FM to Ayr and the surrounding areas. West Sound Radio continues on MW.
  - February – Emap launches a network of Magic stations on its MW frequencies across the north of England. The Yorkshire stations launch on 12 February, replacing and Great Yorkshire Gold and a week later Magic 1152 and Magic 1170 replace Great North Radio.
  - 14 February – At 1.05pm, Kiss 105 begins broadcasting a dance music service across East, West and South Yorkshire.
  - 17 March –
    - The roll-out of the Magic brand concludes when the north west Magic stations – Magic 1152 and Magic Magic 1548 launch.
    - After broadcasting a one-month temporary service called 1278 and 1530 AM West Yorkshire, Classic Gold launches in Bradford and Halifax/Huddersfield. The station is a simulcast of the Classic Gold network heard on MW in central and southern England with a local breakfast show supplemented by local news and information throughout the day.
  - 1 April – Wish FM begins broadcasting to Wigan.
  - 4 May – Yorkshire Dales Radio begins broadcasting on MW across the Yorkshire Dales.
  - 23 May – Lochbroom FM begins broadcasting to the Scottish town of Ullapool.
  - 31 August – Regular programming across UK radio is interrupted to provide ongoing news coverage of the death of Diana, Princess of Wales.
  - 1 September –
    - XFM London begins broadcasting an indie music service across London. It becomes the final London-wide station on FM.
    - KMFM Medway begins broadcasting to the Medway Towns area of Kent.
  - 6 September – Many UK radio stations broadcast live coverage of the Funeral of Diana, Princess of Wales.
  - 21 September – KMFM Canterbury begins broadcasting.
  - 23 September – Century 106 begins broadcasting a regional service across the East Midlands.
  - 29 September –
    - Following the purchase of Faze FM, owner of Kiss 102 and Kiss 105, by Chrysalis Radio, the dance music stations are renamed Galaxy 102 and Galaxy 105.
    - KMFM Shepway and White Cliffs Country begins broadcasting to Dover and Folkestone.
  - 7 October – 107.7 The Wolf begins broadcasting to Wolverhampton.
  - 12 October – Dune FM begins broadcasting to Southport.
  - 20 October – European Klassik Rock begins broadcasting a classic rock service via satellite. The station also operates 28-day RSLs in various cities and counties.
  - 17 November – Sovereign FM begins broadcasting to Eastbourne and Hailsham.
  - 22 November – Vibe 105–108 begins broadcasting a dance music service across East Anglia.
  - 28 November – Star FM 107.2 begins broadcasting to Bristol.
  - 6 December – Waves Radio begins broadcasting to the Peterhead area of Aberdeenshire.
  - 9 December – Chris Evans's media production company, Ginger Media Group buys Virgin Radio from Richard Branson for £85m. Branson had planned to sell the station to Capital Radio, but Evans, who had not wanted to work for the station, launched a rival bid.
- 1998
  - 17 January – KMFM Thanet begins broadcasting to the Thanet area of Kent.
  - 1 March –
    - Huddersfield FM begins broadcasting to Huddersfield.
    - Isles FM begins broadcasting from Stornoway in the Outer Hebrides, Scotland.
  - 7 March – Isle of Wight Radio and Isles FM begins broadcasting. The latter station broadcasts to the Scottish Western islands.
  - 23 March – Star Radio (Cambridge and Ely) begins broadcasting to Cambridge and Ely.
  - 27 March – 107 Crash FM begins broadcasting a new music service to Liverpool.
  - 10 April – Arrow FM begins broadcasting to the Hastings area of East Sussex.
  - April – After just seven months on air, East Midlands station Radio 106 is rebranded as Century 106 and relaunched with a new team of presenters.
  - 18 May –
    - Kestral FM begins broadcasting to Basingstoke.
    - Active FM begins broadcasting to the Havering area of east London.
  - 25 May – Silk FM begins broadcasting to Macclesfield.
  - 31 May – Xtra AM closes after nine years on air and the station is replaced by a relay of Capital Gold. 1998 also saw capital Gold rolling out in Birmingham and Kent, replacing Xtra AM and Invicta Supergold respectively.
  - 6 June – Centre FM begins broadcasting to Burton, Lichfield and Tamworth.
  - 14 June – Wave 105 begins broadcasting across the Solent area.
  - 15 August – QuayWest Radio begins broadcasting to the Bridgwater area of West Somerset.
  - 1 September – Wire FM begins broadcasting to Warrington.
  - 7 September – CAT FM begins broadcasting to the Cheltenham and surrounding areas of north Gloucestershire.
  - 8 September – Century 105 starts broadcasting, becoming the north west's second regional station.
  - 5 October –
    - One hour of Virgin Radio's breakfast show starts simulcasting on Sky One. When a track was played on the radio, viewers saw the song's video.
    - Kingdom FM begins broadcasting across Fife.
  - 7 October – Peak FM begins broadcasting to the Chesterfield area of Derbyshire.
  - 18 October – Chelmer FM begins broadcasting to Chelmsford.
  - 1 November – Fosseway Radio begins broadcasting to the Hinckley area of Leicestershire.
  - 12 November – TalkCo Holdings, whose chairman and chief executive was former Sun Editor Kelvin MacKenzie, purchases Talk Radio UK.
  - 19 November – Mellow 1557 closes and relaunches on FM as Dream 100.
  - 28 November – RNA Arbroath begins broadcasting.
  - 29 November – The Falcon begins broadcasting to Cambridge.
  - 11 December – Champion 103 begins broadcasting to Caernarfon and Anglesey.
  - 13 December – Rutland Radio begins broadcasting to the Rutland area.
  - December – Melody Radio is renamed Magic 105.4 FM following the purchase of Melody Radio by Emap.
  - Unknown – After just a year on air, European Klassik Rock closes down.
  - Unknown – South Coast Radio closes after seven years on air and its station is replaced by Capital Gold.
- 1999
  - January –
    - Choice FM is taken over by the Chrysalis Group, which later renames Choice FM Birmingham Galaxy 102.2.
    - London's dance/urban station Kiss 100 is rebranded by EMAP Radio with a new logo and mainstream pop music is introduced to the playlist, this leads to criticism from some DJ's and listeners.
  - 1 February – Mansfield 103.2 begins broadcasting.
  - 8 February – FLR 107.3 begins broadcasting to the Lewisham area of south London.
  - 20 March – Tower FM begins broadcasting to Bolton and Bury.
  - 3 May – Telford FM begins broadcasting.
  - 22 May – Northern Ireland stations Goldbeat and Heartbeat 1521 close down.
  - 18 June – Launch of Sky News Radio, a service providing bespoke bulletins for Talk Radio UK.
  - 26 June – Fire 107.6 begins broadcasting to Bournemouth and Poole.
  - 24 July – 106.8 Lite FM begins broadcasting to Peterborough.
  - 30 August –
    - Wave 102 begins broadcasting to Dundee.
    - The Revolution begins broadcasting go the Oldham, Rochdale and surrounding areas of eastern Greater Manchester.
  - 5 September – SouthCity FM
  - 19 September – 107.4 The Quay begins broadcasting to Portsmouth.
  - 3 October –
    - Fen Radio 107.5 begins broadcasting to the Fenlands area.
    - Ridings FM begins broadcasting to the Wakefield and the five towns area of West Yorkshire.
    - Win 107.2 begins broadcasting to Winchester.
  - 23 October – Star 107.7 begins broadcasting to Weston-super-Mare.
  - 7 November – Yorkshire Coast Radio Bridlington begins broadcasting to Bridlington and Filey. It operates as an opt-out service from the nearby Scarborough station.
  - 15 November – Bath FM begins broadcasting.
  - 19 November –
    - Beat 106 begins broadcasting across the Scottish central belt.
    - 107 The Edge begins broadcasting across Lanarkshire.
  - 1 December – South Hams Radio begins broadcasting to the South Hams area of Devon.
  - Unknown –
  - Bedford station B979 is rebranded back to its original name of Chiltern FM.

== 2000s ==
- 2000
  - 26 January – Q97.2, fully known as Q97.2 Causeway Radio, begins broadcasting to the Coleraine area of Northern Ireland.
  - 17 February – Talk Radio UK is rebranded as Talksport.
  - 14 March – Chris Evans sells his Ginger Media Group to SMG plc for £225m. The sale made Evans the highest paid entertainer in the UK in 2000, estimated by the Sunday Times Rich List to have been paid around £35.5million.
  - 1 May – 106.3 Bridge FM begins broadcasting to the Bridgend area of South Wales.
  - 3 May – Choice 107.1 begins broadcasting to north London.
  - 29 May – Kick FM begins broadcasting to the Newbury area of Berkshire.
  - May – Capital Radio buys Border Radio Holdings, thereby acquiring the three Century radio stations.
  - 10 July –
    - Argyll FM begins broadcasting across Kintyre and wider Argyll, the southern Inner Hebrides, Clyde islands and Ayrshire in south-west Scotland as well as to the Antrim coast of Northern Ireland.
    - Ten 17 changes its name to Ten 17 Mercury.
  - 25 July – 2BR begins broadcasting to the Burnley area of east Lancashire.
  - 28 September – Channel Travel Radio closes.
  - 3 October – South Wales regional station Real Radio Wales begins broadcasting.
  - 16 October – PrimeTime Radio begins broadcasting on Digital One. It provides a music service aimed at the over 50s.
  - 4 December – FLR 107.3 changes its name to Fusion 107.3FM.
  - Unknown – Delta FM's broadcast area expands when it is merged with Wey Valley Radio.
- 2001
  - 1 March – 107.8 Radio Jackie begins broadcasting to the Kingston-upon-Thames area.
  - 3 March – Hertbeat FM begins broadcasting to Hertford.
  - 31 March – Bright 106.4 begins broadcasting to the Burgess Hill and Haywards Heath areas of West Sussex.
  - 3 June – Compass FM begins broadcasting to Grimsby and Cleethorpes.
  - 16 June – KCR 106.7 begins broadcasting to the Knowsley area of Merseyside.
  - 4 July – Quay West 107.4 begins broadcasting to the Somerset coast.
  - August – The KM Group take full control of Neptune Radio and CTFM.**September – The KM Group rebrands its newly acquired Mercury FM stations as KMFM West Kent and KMFM Medway.
  - 16 October – Saga 105.7 FM, the UK's first radio station dedicated to the over-50s, begins broadcasting in Birmingham.
  - October – The Sky News Radio service is expanded to provide hourly news bulletins, audio and scripts for a number of clients in the commercial radio sector.
  - 23 October – Lakeland Radio begins broadcasting to the Cumbrian towns of Keswick, Windermere and Kendal.
  - 31 October – Mix 107 begins broadcasting to Aylesbury.
  - 5 November – 3TR FM begins broadcasting to the Warminster area of Wiltshire.
  - December – The eight medium wave Magic stations in northern England begin networking 10 am – 2 pm and 7 pm – 6 am with the London station Magic 105.4 providing the programmes.
  - Unknown – Garrison FM begins broadcasting. The station serves military bases across the UK.
- 2002
  - 8 January – Scot FM becomes part of the Real Radio network when it is purchased by GMG Radio and is renamed Real Radio Scotland.
  - mid February – 107.7 Chelmer FM is renamed Dream 107.7.
  - 11 March – TEAMtalk 252 launches. It is intended as a rival for Talksport and BBC Radio 5 Live.
  - 19 March – Q101.2 begins broadcasting to Omagh and Enniskillen.
  - 25 March – Real Radio Yorkshire begins broadcasting a music and speech service to West and South Yorkshire.
  - 14 July – 102.5 Radio Pembrokeshire begins broadcasting.
  - 31 July – TeamTalk 252 closes after four months on air.
  - 31 August – Rugby FM begins broadcasting.
  - September – The KM Group rebrands its newly acquired Mercury FM stations as KMFM West Kent and KMFM Medway.
  - 22 October – Reading 107 begins broadcasting.
  - 8 November – The Radio Authority relieves London station Liberty Radio of its licence to broadcast. The station had repeatedly only obtained a 0.1% share of listening. The Authority awarded the licence to Club Asia, which had previously been broadcasting for several hours each day on Spectrum Radio. This had been the first time in several years that the incumbent broadcaster's licence had not been renewed.
- 2003
  - 3 January – Severn Estuary regional station Galaxy 101 is renamed Vibe 101.
  - 6 January – The LBC services swap wavebands. The rolling news service News Direct 97.3 moves to AM and is renamed LBC News 1152 and LBC News 1152 transfers to FM and is renamed LBC 97.3. The change takes place following the purchase of the two stations by Chrysalis Radio.
  - January – Neptune Radio and CTFM are rebranded KMFM Shepway and White Cliffs Country and KMFM Canterbury respectively.
  - January – Just over a year after EMAP decided to simulcast London station Magic 105.4 on its eight medium wave Magic stations in northern England, and following a sharp decline in listening, the station ends the networking of Magic 105.4. It replaces the simulcast with a regional northern network.
  - 1 February – Mid 106 FM begins broadcasting across mid Ulster.
  - 11 February – John Peters presents the first programme (the breakfast show) on Saga 106.6 FM in Nottingham, making it his third station launch. He launched Radio Trent in 1975 and GEM-AM in 1988.
  - 1 March – Dee 106.3 begins broadcasting to Chester.
  - 5 May – 107 Splash FM begins broadcasting to Worthing.
  - 30 May – Castle Rock FM begins broadcasting to the Dumbarton area.
  - 3 July – Having lost its licence, Liberty Radio closes down after eight years on air. It is immediately replaced by Club Asia.
  - 3 September – River FM begins broadcasting to the Livingston area of West Lothian.
  - 5 October – Dearne FM begins broadcasting to Barnsley and the surrounding area.
  - 18 October – CTR 105.6 begins broadcasting to Maidstone in Kent.
  - 26 October – Ivel FM begins broadcasting to the Yeovil area of south Somerset.
  - 10 November – North Norfolk Radio begins broadcasting.
  - 22 November – Two Lochs Radio begins broadcasting to the Loch Ewe area of Scotland.
- 2004
  - 1 January – Ofcom replaces The Radio Authority.
  - 13 February – North west regional station 100.4 Jazz FM closes down after nearly ten years on air. It is replaced on 1 March by 100.4 Smooth FM.
  - 4 April – High Peak Radio begins broadcasting to the High Peak area of Derbyshire.
  - 1 May – KMFM Extra begins broadcasting across Kent.
  - 10 June – Kerrang! 105.2 begins broadcasting an indie-rock service across the West Midlands.
  - 13 June – 97.1 Radio Carmarthenshire begins broadcasting.
  - 14 July – 97.5 Scarlet FM begins broadcasting to the Llanelli area.
  - 7 September – Saga 105.2 FM begins broadcasting, becoming the third station to broadcast to Scotland's central belt.
- 2005
  - 17 January – Almost all of the UK's commercial stations join to broadcast UK Radio Aid, a twelve-hour event to raise money for the victims of the Asian tsunami.
  - 7 June – London's 102.2 Jazz FM is relaunched as 102.2 Smooth FM. It replaces 102.2 Jazz FM which had closed on 27 May.
  - 21 June – Emap buys Scottish Radio Holdings.
  - 29 August – 106 Century FM is rebranded as Heart 106.
  - 3 October – KMFM Ashford begins broadcasting.
  - 19 November – Lanarkshire station L107 launches, replacing 107 The Edge which had been on air since 2003.
  - 5 December – 102.6 & 106.8 Durham FM begins broadcasting.
  - Unknown – After being acquired by the CN Group, Kix 96 and its other sister stations in the south Midlands are rebranded as Touch FM.
- 2006
  - 14 February – Talk 107 begins broadcasting a speech-based service across Edinburgh.
  - 25 February – Touch FM (Banbury) begins broadcasting.
  - 29 June – 99.9 Radio Norwich begins broadcasting.
  - 2 September – Brunel FM begins broadcasting to Swindon.
  - 6 September – Kiss 100 is relaunched after a decline in listening figures, dance stations Vibe 101 and Vibe 105-108 are also rebranded to Kiss.
  - November – CTR 105.6 in Maidstone, Kent, is purchased by the KM Group, taking the number of KM-owned stations in Kent to 7.
  - December – GMG Radio purchases the Saga Radio Group.
  - 29 September – Cambridge station Star 107.9 closes after eight years on air.
  - 16 October – 107.3 Abbey FM begins broadcasting to Barrow-in-Furness and the surrounding area..
  - Unknown – Galaxy 102.2 is renamed Galaxy Birmingham in line with other Galaxy radio stations.
- 2007
  - January – 96.3 Rock Radio launches. It uses the frequency previous occupied by Q96.
  - 29 January – Livingston station River FM closes after less than four years on air.
  - 26 March – All Smooth Radio and Saga Radio are relaunched as the Smooth Network. Consequently 100.4 Smooth Radio operates in North West England, 102.2 Smooth Radio operates in London, 105.2 Smooth Radio – Glasgow, 106.6 Smooth Radio – East Midlands and 105.7 Smooth Radio airs in the West Midlands.
  - 27 March – Country music station 3C closes after eight years on air.
  - 16 April – Life FM (Harlesden) begins broadcasting to the Harlesden are of London.
  - 20 May – Bristol-based Original 106.5 begins broadcasting.
  - 11 June – Minster Northallerton launches as an opt-out service from the York station.
  - 25 June – It is announced that the Heart Network along with its sister stations The Arrow, LBC and Galaxy are to be sold for £170 million to Global Radio from Chrysalis Radio.
  - 3 August – All stations in the Classic Gold and Capital Gold networks are replaced by a new network called simply Gold, the result of the merger of the Classic Gold and Capital Gold networks under one owner, GCap Media.
  - 23 August – GMG Radio confirms that Mark Goodier's mid-morning show on 102.2 Smooth Radio will be syndicated across other Smooth stations in the network from September.
  - 12 September – CTR 105.6 is rebranded as KMFM Maidstone.
  - 25 September – Heat Radio re-launches with presenters and showbiz news throughout the day, having previously been a music only service.
  - 28 October – Aberdeen-based Original 106 begins broadcasting.
  - 14 December – Sunshine Radio (FM) begins broadcasting to Herefordshire and Monmouthshire.
- 2008
  - 8 January – 97.5 Smooth Radio becomes north east England's third regional station when it begins broadcasting. The licence had been awarded to Saga Radio but Smooth's owners GMG Group took over Saga in 2007, replacing the saga stations with Smooth Radio.
  - 28 January – City Talk 105.9 begins broadcasting, returning speech radio to Liverpool after 17 years.
  - 29 January – Bauer completes its purchase of Emap's radio, television and consumer media businesses, purchasing the assets for £1.14bn.
  - 15 February – Exeter-based community station Phonic FM begins broadcasting.
  - 18 February – Exeter FM begins broadcasting.
  - 15 March – Swindon 105.5 begins broadcasting.
  - 26 March – Leicestershire stations Fosseway Radio and Oak 107 FM merge. Both had been on air since the late 1990s.
  - 1 April – Rock Radio (North East) begins broadcasting.
  - 4 April – Touch FM (Warwick) begins broadcasting.
  - 28 April – The Heart Network begins simulcasting some of its programmes from Heart 106.2 in London. There are now only ten hours of local programming from 100.7 Heart FM in Birmingham and Heart 106 in the East Midlands during weekdays and four hours on Saturday and Sunday.
  - 3 May – After 14 years on air, Manchester United Radio closes.
  - 5 May – 106.1 Rock Radio begins broadcasting to Manchester.
  - 26 May – Andover Sound begins broadcasting.
  - 2 June – Q Radio begins broadcasting.
  - 16 June – Nation Radio begins broadcasting across South Wales.
  - 31 July – Fen Radio 107.5 closes after nine years on air.
  - 25 September – 106.5 Central Radio begins broadcasting to Preston, Leyland and Chorley.
  - 29 September – Virgin Radio changes its name to Absolute Radio.
  - 8 October – Jazz FM returns to the airwaves.
  - 30 October – Solent-based Original 106 is renamed The Coast following the sale of the station two months earlier to Celador.
  - 8 November – Poole-based community station The Bay 102.8 begins broadcasting.
  - 23 December – Edinburgh station Talk 107 closes after two years on air.
- 2009
  - 5 January – Chiltern Radio, Hereward FM, Radio Broadland, Q103, Northants 96, SGR Colchester, SGR Ipswich, and Horizon Radio are all rebranded as Heart after earlier being acquired by Global Radio.
  - 30 January – South Cumbria station 107.3 Abbey FM closes after less than three years on air.
  - 23 March – Fox FM, GWR FM Bath, GWR Bristol, GWR FM Wiltshire, Champion 103, 2CR, Essex FM, Gemini FM, Severn Sound, Ocean FM, Lantern FM, Coast 96.3, Plymouth Sound, Orchard FM, South Hams Radio, Wirral's Buzz and 2-Ten FM are all rebranded as Heart.
  - 1 April –
    - Ownership of Touch FM (Banbury) is transferred to Banbury Broadcasting Company Ltd. The station was subsequently renamed Banbury Sound on 1 June.
    - Mersey 106.7 closes after six years on air.
  - 3 April – London stations Time 107.3 and Time 106.8 close. The latter station had launched as Radio Thamesmead in 1990.
  - 30 April – Welsh station Valleys Radio closes after thirteen years on air.
  - May – Orion Media purchases BRMB, Mercia, Wyvern, Beacon in the West Midlands and Heart 106 in the East Midlands from Global Radio for a sale price worth £37.5 million.
  - 1 June – Banbury Sound begins broadcasting.
  - 14 June – Launch of The Big Top 40 Show, a chart show broadcast on commercial radio stations in the UK, and based on a combination of airplay and music download figures provided by iTunes.
  - 18 June – It is announced that the media executive Steve Orchard has bought the CN Group of Midland radio stations, having established the Quidem group. The stations involved in the purchase are: 107.3 Touch FM, 102 Touch FM, 96.2 Touch FM, 101.6 & 102.4 Touch FM and 107.1 Rugby FM.
  - 22 June – Invicta FM, Southern FM and 103.4 Marcher Sound are rebranded as Heart.
  - 1 July – After eight years on air, Mix 107 closes down.
  - 14 September – All programmes, apart from weekday/Saturday breakfast and Sunday afternoons, are networked across the KMFM network.
  - 2 November – Alpha 103.2, Minster Northallerton and Durham FM are merged into a single station called Star Radio North East.
  - 10 November – Thirteen stations owned by GMG Radio take part in an eighteen-hour on-air appeal to raise money for the Help for Heroes charity. The event raises almost £200,000.
  - 1 December – Touch Radio is rebranded to Touch FM.

== 2010s ==
- 2010
  - 28 February – Radio Plymouth begins broadcasting.
  - 24 March – The five radio stations owned by YMC Ltd (3TR FM, Bath FM, Brunel FM, Quay West 102.4/100.8 and Quay West 107.4) are closed by administrators after multiple refusals on the part of regulator Ofcom to transfer the licenses, following a number of financial issues at the stations after TLRC's sale.
  - 5 April –
    - Academy FM (Thanet) begins broadcasting to the Thanet area of Kent.
    - Huddersfield station Pennine FM closes after a decade on air.
  - 6 April – Sunshine 1530 closes after three years on air.
  - 15 April – Under new guidelines from Ofcom, from May commercial radio rivals will be allowed to co-locate to cut costs, and to slash local programming. The guidelines are a result of the recently passed Digital Economy Act.
  - 29 April – Lanarkshire station L107 closes after five years on air.
  - 3 June – Kestral FM's broadcast area expands when it subsumes Delta FM. However, a split breakfast show continues for a short while, prior to all output being merged in 2011.
  - 21 June – Global Radio announces plans to reduce the number of its local Heart stations from 33 to 15 "super stations" in a reorganisation. The stations will have their own breakfast and drivetime shows, and local news bulletins, but all other output will come from London. A further two stations owned by Global will also be subsumed into the Heart network.
  - 29 June – Smooth Radio announces plans to merge its five stations based in England, creating a national network. The new station will be based in Manchester and will see the loss of 60 jobs at Smooth's other bases. A phased launch will begin on 4 October.
  - 30 June – Heart Solent replaces Heart Hampshire and Heart Dorset & New Forest.
  - 2 July –
    - Heart Cambridgeshire replaces Heart Peterborough and Heart Cambridge.
    - Heart North Wales and West replaces Heart North Wales Coast, Heart Cheshire and North East Wales and Heart Wirral.
  - 9 July – Heart Thames Valley replaces Heart Oxfordshire and Heart Berkshire.
  - 16 July –
    - Heart Four Counties replaces Heart Northants, Heart Milton Keynes, Heart Dunstable and Heart Bedford || Dunstable, later Milton Keynes.
    - Heart West Country replaces Heart Bristol, Heart Bath and Heart Somerset.
  - 26 July –
    - Hertfordshire station Mercury 96.6 becomes part of the Heart network and is relaunched as Heart Hertfordshire.
    - Heart Essex replaces Heart Essex (Chelmsford & Southend), Heart Colchester and Ten 17.
    - Heart Sussex and Surrey replaces Heart Sussex and Mercury FM.
  - 27 August – Heart Devon replaces Heart Exeter and Heart Torbay, Heart Plymouth, Heart North Devon and Heart South Devon.
  - 3 September – Heart East Anglia replaces Heart Norwich and Heart Ipswich.
  - 4 October – Smooth Radio launches its new national station.
  - 25 December – Radio Hafren launches as a replacement for Radio Maldwyn.
- 2011
  - 1 January – East Midlands station Heart 106 closes. It is replaced by Gem 106.
  - 3 January – 95.8 Capital FM London launches nationally and becomes a part of The Capital FM Network following the merger of Global Radio's Hit Music and Galaxy networks to form the nine-station 'Capital Network'. Other than daily breakfast and weekday drivetime shows, the majority of Capital's London-based output is now networked.
  - 11 January – KMFM West Kent and KMFM Maidstone merge their breakfast shows, meaning all programming is shared across both stations.
  - 17 February – Perth FM closes.
  - 28 March – Celador Radio files a format change request for The Coast to air classic and contemporary rock instead of adult alternative.
  - 28 July – GMG Radio announces that the Manchester-based station 106.1 Rock Radio will be re-branded as 106.1 Real Radio XS, and that Glasgow-based 96.3 Rock Radio will be sold.
  - 5 September – Manchester station 106.1 Rock Radio is replaced by Real Radio XS.
- 2012
  - 6 January – Following its sale to UKRD, Fresh Radio which broadcast on MW across the Yorkshire Dales, closes after fifteen years on air. The more populous parts of the area are later served by Stray FM which is expanded to cover areas such as Skipton and Wharfedale and the Richmond area is served to Star Radio North East.
  - 23 January – GMG Radio announces it is conducting a "full review" of its news staff. Currently the broadcaster employs 39 journalists, nine of whom are based in Scotland.
  - 26 January – The UK-based British Army radio station, Garrison FM switches on two more transmitters in Inverness, making the city the second in Scotland to receive the service after Edinburgh.
  - 3 February – UTV Media acquires the licences for The Wyre and The Severn from MNA Broadcasting.
  - 7 February – UTV Media unveils plans to merge The Wolf, The Wyre and The Sever and rebrand them as Signal 107. The rebrand happens on 26 March.
  - 16 February – Ofcom gives the KMFM n e t w o r k permission to network the breakfast show, meaning programming will be identical across all seven stations at all times.
  - 7 March – Guildford based County Sound is given approval by Ofcom to change its classic hits format to a community-based information station under the name Eagle Extra.
  - 16 March – Quidem, owners of the Touch FM brand agrees a deal with the Lincs FM Group to buy Oak FM in Loughborough and Hinckley, thus increasing its number of stations to eight.
  - 26 March – Orion Media rebrands BRMB, Beacon, Mercia and Wyvern as Free Radio.
  - 2 April – From today, Talksport dedicates its entire programming schedule to sport output, having previously offered a variety of sport and general news-related topics.
  - April –
    - Celador rebrands Andover Sound and Newbury Sound as The Breeze, bringing to nine the number of stations with that name.
    - The weekend breakfast show on the north of England Magic stops being a local show in favour of a networked programme. Only the weekday breakfast show remains locally produced.
  - 1 May – Ofcom approves a co-location request from Touch Radio Staffordshire to move from Tamworth to Oak FM's headquarters in Coalville. Touch will share some of Oak's programming, but must retain its local Staffordshire-based breakfast show.
  - 7 May – Launch of Heart Cornwall, replacing Atlantic FM.
  - 1 June – Swansea's 102.1 Bay Radio is relaunched as Nation 80s, becoming the first FM station in the UK to play nothing but 80s music.
  - 12 June – It is reported that GMG has received multiple offers for its radio business which value it at £50 million, as the company seeks to reshape itself to stem losses being made by The Guardian and The Observer.
  - 25 June –
    - GMG Radio is sold to Global Radio for an undisclosed amount, thought to be around £50m. However, no structural changes will be made to either organisations until the deal has been investigated by Ofcom. Several rival radio groups express their concerns over the takeover and the effect it could have on commercial radio in the UK.
    - KMFM Extra closes and is replaced on DAB by the new-countywide KMFM.
  - 30 August – West Midlands based Sanjhi Awaz Radio ceases broadcasting after two years on air due to financial problems.
  - 4 September – Gold is replaced by Free Radio 80s in the West Midlands on MW and DAB.
  - 8 August – Southport station Dune FM closes after fifteen years on air.
  - 11 October – The Office of Fair Trading agrees to fast-track the investigation into Global Radio's purchase of GMG Radio after Secretary of State for Culture, Media and Sport Maria Miller says the deal will not be investigated for media plurality. The matter is also forwarded onto the Competition Commission, which oversees business mergers and takeovers. The Competition Commission later announces 27 March 2013 as the date on which it will publish its findings into the takeover.
  - 5 November – Real Radio begins networking its daytime schedule.
  - 15 December – Celador rebrands its recently acquired Kestrel FM stations as The Breeze.
- 2013
  - 14 February – The Competition Commission publish their preliminary findings into the Global Radio takeover of GMG Radio, recommending a full or partial sale of the now renamed Real and Smooth Radio Ltd.
  - 31 March – Garrison FM is merged with BFBS, resulting in BFBS taking over the six Garrison stations currently on air.
  - 14 June – Kerrang! 105.2's final day of broadcasting on FM in the West Midlands. The 105.2 frequency is taken over by Planet Rock simulcasting from London. Kerrang! continues on DAB, but with content aired from London from 17 June.
  - 7 October – Choice FM is rebranded as Capital Xtra.
- 2014
  - 6 January – It had been reported on 30 December 2013 that Hot Radio would close at 18:00, but the station remains on air after the deadline had passed.
  - 20 January – Global Radio is found to be in breach of their license remit for Heart Cornwall after a listener complained to Ofcom that there was not enough local news and speech to make it a fully local station.
  - 6 February – Global Radio sells eight of its regional stations to Irish media holdings firm Communicorp.
  - 11 February – LBC 97.3 launches nationally on the Digital One platform.
  - 14 March – Global Radio announces that Gold will become a non-stop music service, with the exception of the breakfast show and Saturday's Vinyl Heaven.
  - 24 March –
    - Smooth Radio returns to airing local output on its regional frequencies, with local programming for Breakfast and Drivetime, and a raft of new presenters joining the network.
    - Smooth Radio replaces Gold on MW across southern England.
  - 4 April – Real XS Glasgow closes at midnight, and is rebranded as Xfm Scotland from 7 April.
  - 6 May –
    - Real Radio is rebranded as Heart.
    - Following the launch of Heart North Wales, Capital North West and Wales replaces the former Heart station Heart North Wales & West which had broadcast to Cheshire, the Wirral Peninsula and North Wales.
- 2015
  - 5 January – All Magic Network AM stations in the north of England are rebranded as Bauer City 2.
  - 9 January – UTV Media confirms that it is considering the sale of some of its UK radio stations.
  - 3 February – Ofcom announces that two bids have been received for the second national digital multiplex.
  - 11 February – Welsh station Radio Hafren closes after 22 years on air.
  - 5 June – UTV Media agrees a £10 million deal to sell Liverpool's Juice FM to Global Radio.
  - 7 September –
    - Global announces that XFM will be relaunched as a national station called Radio X on 21 September.
    - Absolute Radio starts broadcasting on FM in the West Midlands, replacing Planet Rock.
  - 13 September – Ahead of the relaunch of XFM as Radio X, Global hands back the Paisley licence, on which it had broadcast XFM Scotland, to Ofcom when the regulator refused Global's request to network 24/7 from London.
  - 19 October – Time 106.6 closes after serving Slough, Windsor and Maidenhead since 1993.
  - 7 December – Liverpool stations Radio City 2 and Radio City Talk swap wavebands. City 2 moves from AM to FM with City Talk going in the opposite direction.
- 2016
  - 18 January – Following Global Radio's purchase of Liverpool station Juice 107.6, the station is relaunched as Capital Liverpool.
  - March – Manchester station Real Radio XS is rebranded as XS Manchester.
  - 15 March – Mellow Magic and Talksport 2 begin broadcasting on the Sound Digital multiplex. They are joined on the multiplex on 21 March by Talkradio, on the 27th by Premier Praise, on the 28th by Magic Chilled and on the 30th by Virgin Radio.
  - 6 May – Orion Media announces that they have been bought by Bauer for an undisclosed fee, reportedly between £40 and £50 million. This gives Bauer the West Midlands network of Free Radio stations and East Midlands regional station Gem 106.
  - June–September – Wireless Group is acquired by Rupert Murdoch's News UK which known for its newspaper business.
  - 9 September – Union JACK begins broadcasting.
- 2017
  - 29 March – UKRD Group announces that it is to hand back the licenses which are used to provide Star Radio North East to Ofcom apart from the Northallerton licence which it proposes to transfer back to Minster FM. Ofcom confirmed the transfer of the Northallerton licence to Minster on 4 April 2017.
  - 31 March – Star Radio is reprieved when UKRD announces that it has sold the station to View TV Group.
  - 1 August – Star Radio North East is rebranded as Rathergood Radio.
  - 20 November – Global announces that it has purchased Cumbrian stations The Bay and Lakeland Radio from CN Group.
  - 22 December – The former pirate station Radio Caroline begins broadcasting on MW on a full-time basis to Suffolk and north Essex, having been granted a licence to do so by Ofcom. The station uses a previously redundant BBC World Service transmitter mast at Orford Ness.
- 2018
  - 5 March – Cumbrian stations The Bay and Lakeland Radio are relaunched as Heart North Lancashire & Cumbria and Smooth Lake District respectively following Global's purchase of the two stations from CN Group.
  - 19 March – Love Sport Radio launches on MW across London. It uses the frequency previously occupied by Spectrum Radio.
  - 3 April – Aberdeen station Northsound 2 stops broadcasting on MW. The station continues to broadcast on DAB and online. It becomes the first commercial radio station in Scotland – and the first of Bauer's local stations – to cease analogue broadcasting.
  - 4 June –
    - Manchester station Key 103 is rebranded as Hits Radio Manchester. The station is a localised version of The Hits Radio which replaces DAB station The Hits.
    - Key 2 is renamed Key Radio.
  - 12 June – For the first time since its inception in 2004, Ofcom does not award a re-adversided licence to the incumbent licensee when it awards the Ipswich licence to Ipswich 102. It will replace Town 102 on 18 October.
  - 1 August – Ahead of its launch on FM in October, Ipswich 102 goes on air on DAB.
  - 15 August – Scottish station NECR closes after 28 years on air.
  - 23 October – The first radio station to have a playlist made up entirely of female artists, JACK Radio, launches on DAB. Jack will also feature female sports and material from female stand-up comedians.
  - 3 November – Nation Radio Scotland launches, broadcasting to Renfrewshire, Glasgow and West Central Scotland.
  - 17 December – Absolute Radio stops broadcasting on FM in the West Midlands. The frequency is to be transferred to Greatest Hits Radio.
- 2019
  - 7 January –
    - Greatest Hits Radio launches, replacing the Bauer City 2 branding. Individual station identities in Northern England are dropped and are rebranded to GHR with Scotland unaffected. The new network extends to the West Midlands although GHR West Midlands continues to air a weekday three-hour local show.
    - West Midlands station Free Radio 80s closes. It is replaced by either Absolute Classic Rock or GHR West Midlands.
  - 26 February – Global Radio announces plans to replace the regional breakfast shows on Capital, Heart and Smooth with a single national breakfast show for each network. Also, the number of drivetime shows will be reduced with local shows replaced by regional programmes.
  - 5 April – Country Hits Radio launches.
  - 8 April –
    - Lancashire station 2BR stops broadcasting and is replaced by a relay of Capital Manchester. This comes nine months after Global had bought 2BR from UKRD.
    - Capital London's breakfast show goes national, resulting in the scrapping of all other local breakfast shows apart from on Capital Cymru. The only 'local' output is at drivetime and the new regulations mean that Global is able to replace local shows with 10 regional programmes which will be networked across all stations in that region.
  - 31 May – Radio Ceredigion ceases broadcasting after its owners, Nation Broadcasting, decided to close the station and replace it with a relay of Nation Radio Wales.
  - 3 June – The local Heart breakfast shows are axed to make way for a single Heart breakfast show from London. Also, the number of drivetime shows are reduced with regional shows replacing local programmes.
  - 1 August – London stations Panjab Radio and Love Sport Radio swap frequencies.
  - 2 September –
    - Bauer begins to network its Hits Radio Manchester weekday Drivetime show on all but one of its Hits Radio stations in England, leaving only the weekday breakfast show as a local show following the removal in July of the one remaining local weekend programme.
    - Smooth Radio's networked Drivetime show launches. At the same time, the number of breakfast shows drops to seven.
  - 28 October – Global relaunches LBC London News as a national 24-hour rolling news channel called LBC News.
  - 2 December – Quidem's six local stations in the south east Midlands become part of the Capital network. They operate as Capital Mid-Counties, sharing all programmes with the Capital network apart from a local weekday drivetime show.

== 2020s ==
- 2020
  - 1 April – Your Radio closes and the frequency begins transmitting Nation Radio Scotland.
  - April – Jack 3, branded as Jack 3 & Chill, replaces Jack 2 on 107.9 MHz in Oxfordshire. an easy listening station which launched on DAB in Oxfordshire in May 2017.
  - 31 May – Liverpool speech station Radio City Talk closes.
  - 30 June – Bauer switches off the MW transmitters which had been carrying Absolute Classic Rock since the start of 2019. Consequently, Bauer is no longer broadcasting on MW in the West Midlands.
  - 20 July – Pulse 1, Signal 1, The Wave 96.4 and Fire Radio become part of the Hits Radio network with all programming, apart from weekday breakfast, networked. All four stations retain their station name.
  - 31 August –
    - Bauer closes Leeds station Radio Aire after 39 years on air. Its frequency is transferred to Greatest Hits Radio.
    - Hits Radio South Coast launches, thereby becoming the second FM station to be known on air as Hits Radio. The station had previously broadcast as The Breeze South Coast and the change is made following the purchase in 2019 of The Breeze network from Celador Radio.
  - 1 September – The majority of the stations that Bauer Media acquired the previous year from UKRD, Lincs FM Group, Wireless Group and Celador Radio. join Greatest Hits Radio, clustered to provide regional programming outside of network hours, consisting of three hours each weekday teatime. All of the affected stations lose their individual station names.
  - 16 October – Global switches off its mediumwave frequencies in Cardiff and Newport
  - 3 November – Global switches off its MW frequencies in Luton and Bedford. Both sets of frequencies had been used to broadcast Smooth Radio and in both areas Smooth is available on DAB.
  - 16 November – Following the purchase of The Revolution by Bauer Media, the east Manchester station is closed and its frequency transferred to Greatest Hits Radio, thereby giving Greatest Hits Radio Manchester its first berth on FM.
  - 11 December – Union JACK Rock and Union JACK Dance launch on Sound Digital. They replace JACK Radio on the multiplex.
  - 31 December – Love Sport Radio closes.
- 2021
  - 26 April – Bauer switches off its mediumwave frequencies in Lancashire, Greater Manchester, Leeds and Humberside. They are being switched off following the launch of Greatest Hits Radio on FM in those areas.
  - 17 May –
    - Greatest Hits Radio replaces Absolute Radio on FM 105.8 in London.
    - Country Hits Radio rebrands as Absolute Radio Country.
  - 17 June – Bauer purchases Stockport-based Imagine FM and announces it will join the Greatest Hits Radio network.
  - 9 August – Global Radio confirms its purchase of Quidem Media, allowing it to take full control of six Midlands stations that are running under the Capital brand.
  - 10 August – FM radio stations in North Yorkshire are forced off the air following a fire at Bilsdale transmitting station.
  - 1 September – Imagine FM rebrands as Greatest Hits Radio.
  - 6 September – Bournemouth's Fire Radio and Bristol's Sam FM rebrand as Hits Radio.
- 2022
  - 21 April – Nation Broadcasting launches Breezy Radio, a station replacing Swansea Bay Radio on 102.1FM in Swansea, and available throughout Wales on DAB. Later in 2022, the station is relaunched as Easy Radio.
  - 3 May – Fix Radio begins broadcasting nationwide after launching on the SDL Mutliplex.
  - 1 September – Launch of Virgin Radio 80s Plus on DAB in London and Central Scotland, as well as online.
  - 2 September – University Radio York is awarded a five-year licence by Ofcom to broadcast on 88.3FM to the University of York after taking part in a one-year broadcasting trial on FM of stations broadcasting on FM with a maximum radius of 1 kilometre. It was the only student radio station to do so.
  - 4 October – Radio Wyvern is relaunched in Worcester on 106.7FM, replacing Youthcomm Radio, which has used the frequency since 2008. This incarnation of Wyvern is a joint venture between Muff Muffin, Sammy Southall and former Wyvern presenter Paul Ellery.
- 2023
  - 20 January – Absolute Radio stops broadcasting on MW. Consequently, Absolute Radio becomes a digital-only station. A retune loop is active from midnight on this day. Ofcom revokes the mediumwave licence on 14 February.
  - 3 April – Lincs FM stops broadcasting on FM when it is replaced by a relay of Greatest Hits Radio Lincolnshire. However the station continues to broadcast on DAB.
  - 25 June – University Radio York switches off its MW frequency after 55 years on air, having made the decision to move to FM.
  - 30 June – Global Radio switches off more of its MW frequencies. It turns off all but two of the AM transmitters which carry Gold network, leaving the station as a digital only service apart from in London and Manchester, and Global switched off Smooth Radio's AM frequencies in Dorset, Essex, Gloucestershire, Norfolk, Suffolk, Wiltshire and Plymouth.
  - 4 September – BRMB is relaunched in Birmingham when community station Big City Radio rebrands its DAB output. Big City Radio continues online.
  - 29 September – Global switches off of its 1548KHz London frequency used by Gold.
- 2024
  - 19 January – Sunshine 855 switches off its mediumwave frequency on 855KHz, having been granted permission to do so by Ofcom due to the expensive cost of maintaining the transmitters and the small number of listeners who listen on mediumwave.
  - 28 March – Wave 105 closes at 10pm and its frequencies are then transferred to Greatest Hits Radio.
  - 17 April – Bauer stations Free Radio, Pirate FM, Gem Radio, Hallam FM, Lincs FM, Metro Radio, Pulse 1, Radio City, Rock FM, Signal 1, TFM, Viking FM and The Wave rebrand to Hits Radio. The stations continue to have local breakfast output, but have networked programming at all other times. Local news, advertising and traffic updates continue to air.
  - 1 May – Sun FM rebrands to Nation Radio North East
  - July – Oban FM closes.
  - 16 September – West FM rebrands as Clyde 1 Ayrshire.
  - 22 September – After 34 years, Kiss 100 in London stops broadcasting on FM due to it being replaced by Hits Radio.
- 2025
  - 24 February – In Manchester, Radio X offshoot Radio X 90s replaces XS Manchester.
  - 3 March – Following Bauer Media Audio UK reaching a deal in January 2025 to acquire Star Radio in Cambridgeshire, the station rebrands as Hits Radio.
  - 21 May – Following last year's closure of Oban FM, Nevis Radio starts broadcasting to the area.
  - 9 June – Bauer begins networking a single breakfast show across its Hits Radio network in England and Wales.
  - 31 July – Nation Broadcasting surrenders its FM licence for Ceredigion following Ofcom requiring Nation to reintroduce local programming. Nation had been using the three frequencies in the licensing area to relay Nation Radio Wales. Nation Radio continues to be available in the area via DAB.
  - 1 August – Time 107.5 is acquired by Nation Broadcasting and is rebranded as Nation Radio London.
- 2026
  - 20 July – Heartland FM announces that, after 34 years, it will be closing down.
  - 1 September – More Radio Sussex and Isle of Wight Radio was accuired by Nation Broadcasting.
  - 14 September – Mansfield 103.2 rebranded as Mansfield Radio.

== See also ==
- Timeline of radio in London
- Timeline of radio in Manchester
- Timeline of radio in Northern Ireland
- Timeline of radio in Scotland
- Timeline of radio in Wales
- Timeline of digital radio in the United Kingdom
