= The Voice (North Devon) =

Coordinates: 51.079°N 4.0594°W

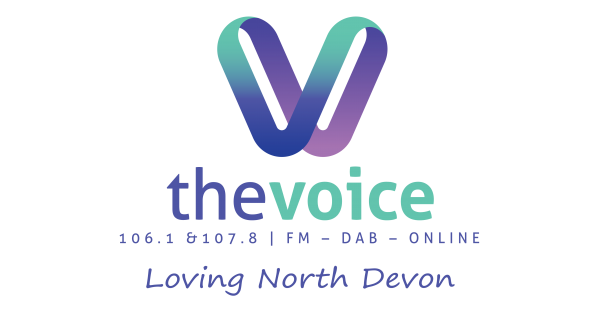
- Barnstaple; England
- Frequencies: FM: 106.1 MHz (Barnstaple); 107.8 MHz (Bideford & Surrounding Areas); 107.8 MHz (Ilfracombe); DAB

Programming
- Format: AC, Pop

Ownership
- Owner: The Voice (North Devon) CIC

History
- First air date: 4 July 2010 (online); 9 November 2010 (First FM RSL); 2 April 2012 (DAB); 18 January 2014 (Full Time FM)

Links
- Website: http://www.thevoicefm.co.uk

The Voice is a local radio station serving North Devon, and based at studios in Barnstaple.

As of September 2024, the station broadcasts to a weekly audience of 14,000 according to RAJAR.

== History ==
The station began broadcasting online in July 2010 as Network North Devon, part of a group of internet radio stations owned by former Lantern FM presenter Ian Starling. The station was set up in response to Global Radio's decision to merge five of its Heart radio stations (in North Devon, Plymouth & the surrounding areas, the Exeter & Torbay areas and the South Hams) into one county-wide station based in Exeter. By this time, local programming on the Heart stations had been restricted to breakfast and drivetime slots.

The Voice was granted its first licence to broadcast on FM for 28 days from 9 November 2010 to 6 December 2010 under a restricted service licence (RSL) by Ofcom, serving the Barnstaple area on 106 FM and online via the station's website. Further RSL broadcasts have since been made on FM for the Barnstaple and Bideford areas.

While the station was off air between its various FM broadcasts, it continued to provide live programming daily from the Barnstaple studios via its website and iPhone app. In January 2012, The Voice moved from its location on The Square to new temporary studios above 21 High Street, Barnstaple sharing space with The Olden Group.

The Voice planned to apply for the North Devon commercial FM licence in 2011, but shortly before the renewal date Now Digital submitted a proposal to Ofcom to extend DAB coverage in to North Devon, which would allow Heart Devon to automatically retain the licence. Despite the vast majority of responses to the consultation being 'No', Ofcom approved the request, effectively blocking The Voice from applying for the commercial licence.

=== DAB Launch ===
On 20 March 2012, during a 28-day RSL from 16 March 2012 to 12 April 2012, The Voice announced it had won a full-time licence to broadcast across most of North Devon on the local DAB digital radio multiplex, broadcast from the Huntshaw Cross transmitter.

The station began DAB broadcasts on Monday 2 April 2012 at 6am, following a weekend of testing. Its launch song was John Farnham's You're The Voice, which it adopted as its theme tune over the various broadcasts.

=== FM Launch ===
After being unsuccessful in its plans to win the North Devon commercial FM licence, the station applied for a full-time five year community radio licence, which was awarded in April 2012.

The FM service was launched on Saturday 18 January 2014. The first record played was John Farnham, You're The Voice, followed by a new version of Eternal Flame (which was the first record played on North Devon's first commercial station in 1992) by local band Zamba. The song was specially commissioned for the launch of The Voice on FM. The FM service is broadcast on two frequencies; 106.1 for Barnstaple and surrounding areas and 107.8 for Bideford and Ilfracombe.

=== New studios ===
In July 2017, the station moved to new studios in Barnstaple in the former Citizens Advice building. Paul Crockett, managing director of The Voice said: "the new facilities are the envy of many a commercial station up and down the land". In the same week that the new studios opened, the station was contacted by Channel Four, which informed the station it was the most-listened-to radio station in North Devon.

=== The Voice 2 ===
On Wednesday 7 February 2024, a new spin off station from The Voice was announced on air, on social media and online. The Voice 2 will be launched on DAB digital radio, online and on mobile app on 9 April 2024, playing music from the 60s, 70s and 80s.

== Presenters ==
The Voice features a wide range of programmes, created and produced in Barnstaple, North Devon.

Presenters currently on air at The Voice and The Voice 2 are:

- Laura James.
- Paul Hopper
- James Parkes
- Robert Stirzaker
- Chris Robbins
- Martin King
- Paul Andrews
- Ian Roberts
- Darryl Mollart
- Dave Englefield
- Marc Austin
- Lee Wardle
- Amy Dymond
- Bonnie Stainer
- Tessie
- Tim Ley
- Steve Jones
- Lee Chater
- Dean Moore
- Stu Dee
- Sarah Bunt
- Mark Chappell
- Alistair Gordon
- Debbie O'Keefe
- Keith Lockyer
