= Star 107 =

Star 107 may refer to a number of independent radio stations in the United Kingdom:

- Star Radio (Cambridge and Ely) in Cambridgeshire
- Star 107.2 in Bristol
- Star 107.5 in Cheltenham, Gloucestershire
- Star 107.7 in Weston-super-Mare, Somerset
- Star 107.9 in Stroud, Gloucestershire
