= Heart Oxfordshire =

Radio station in Oxford, England

Coordinates: 51.7377°N 1.1946°W

Heart 102.6 & 97.4 FM
- Oxford; England
- Broadcast area: Oxfordshire
- Frequencies: 97.4 (Banbury), 102.6 (Oxfordshire), and 103.4 (Henley-on-Thames) MHz

Programming
- Format: Hot AC

Ownership
- Owner: Global Radio

History
- First air date: (as Fox FM) 15 September 1989

Links
- Website: http://www.heart.co.uk/thamesvalley

Heart Oxfordshire (formerly Fox FM) was an Independent Local Radio station broadcasting to Oxfordshire on 102.6 MHz FM from the Oxford transmitting station and 97.4 MHz FM from a relay station at Farthinghoe, near Banbury.

Originally launched in September 1989, it was rebranded on 23 March 2009 by Global Radio in line with its rebranding of most of the One Network, of which the station was formerly a part. The station was closed and relocated to the Heart Berkshire studios in July 2010 and rebranded again as "Heart Thames Valley".

== History ==
Fox FM was launched on Friday 15 September 1989 from an ex-carpet warehouse in Cowley, Oxford. Following weeks of test transmissions, its first song after the official sign-on was Uptown Girl by Billy Joel. The Fox name was said to be a contraction of the original company name, the 'First Oxfordshire Radio Co'. The station was originally a joint venture between Blackwell's Group, Oxford and County Newspapers (now Newsquest Oxfordshire), Capital Radio and County Sound Radio. Jeremy Loyd (general manager of Capital) and Mike Powell (managing director of County Sound) were the driving forces behind the licence application that won the frequency. The original presenters were Phil Miles, Steve Ellis, Tony James, Jane Markham (the Fox Report), Steve Priestly, Paul Evans, Stuart Cameron, Henry Aubrey-Fletcher, Adrian Maughan and Claire Thomas. The chairman was Julian (Toby) Blackwell and the managing director (MD) was Tom Hunter. In 1994, Sally Oldham became MD and Jean-Paul Hansford became the programme director (PD). The following year, the MD was Mark Flanagan and PD Phil Angell. In 1998, Capital Radio plc took full control of Fox, Lyn Long became MD and Alex Roland became P.D. followed 12 months later by Stuart Davies

In 2005, Fox FM became part of the GCap Media group, formed from the merger of GWR Group and Capital Radio. In 2006, GCap Media applied for a new FM licence covering Oxford and South Oxfordshire, with a service called Fox Gold. Following GCap's takeover in 2008, Fox FM was integrated with Global Radio's portfolio and rebranded Heart Oxfordshire on 23 March 2009. It was one of the 38 regional stations that formed One Network.

== Notable former presenters ==
- Steve Priestley (now at Greatest Hits Radio Yorkshire)
- Adrian Maughan
- Ali Jones
- Phil Angell
- Debbie Ryan
- Adam Ball
- Steve Penk
- Dan Mills
- James Heming
- Jo Thoenes
- Katy Hill
- Stephanie Hirst (now at Hits Radio)

== Network restructuring ==
On 21 June 2010, Global Radio announced plans to close Heart Oxfordshire and merge the station with Heart Berkshire as part of plans to reduce the Heart network of stations from 33 to 15. The new station, Heart Thames Valley began broadcasting from Reading on 9 July 2010.

== Identity ==
Like other stations in "The One Network", Fox FM used similar idents – ending with the tagline "More Music Variety" which was later continued by Heart. The additional tagline of "Haven't you heard?" was used on the website and advertising but not spoken on air.

Despite being part of GCap since 2005, it retained the logo devised by Capital until September 2007, although its logo after that date was more in keeping with other One Network stations. Originally, its logo was a cartoon fox called "Freddy" whose nose and tail were poking out onto a radio dial which became highly recognisable in the Oxford area as it was distributed widely on car window stickers.

== Local Heroes ==
Fox FM rewarded notable people from the local area in their annual 'Local Heroes' awards. In 2003, four winners received accolades – including Young Person, Local Hero and Special Award. Andrew Baker, a fundraiser for John Radcliffe Oxford Children's Hospital in 2003 together with young singing star Zoe Mace in 2004. Fundraiser Jeff Samways and sea cadet volunteer Phil Pether were also amongst those honoured.

== Charity ==
Over its last ten years of broadcasting, Fox FM raised thousands of pounds each year for their chosen charities in their "Help An Oxfordshire Child" campaign. In 2008, over £48,000 raised by its listeners, staff and partners was distributed out to many children's charities. In the past, Oxford Children's Hospital, The Oxfordshire Playbus and the National Multiple Sclerosis Society have benefited. Events held towards the campaign included the very first Oxford Santa Run, raising over £30,000, the Oxford Moonlight Stroll, an online auction and a charity football tournament held in Abingdon, as well as a celebrity football match at Oxford United's Kassam Stadium in which a team of Fox presenters took on the stars from teen soap Hollyoaks in June 2008, as well as a greyhound race night, buggy trek and a charity premiere.

Help An Oxfordshire Child pledged £40,000 to name the Fox FM Outpatients Department in Oxford's New Children's Hospital, which was completed in 2008.
