= 102.8 FM =

Radio broadcasting frequency

This is a list of radio stations that broadcast on FM frequency 102.8 MHz:

== India ==
- Vividh Bharati in Hyderabad

== Bosnia and Herzegovina ==
- RSG Radio in Sarajevo

== China ==
- RTHK relays CNR Radio The Greater Bay in Hong Kong

== Indonesia ==
- Radio Jatayu Angkasa (JFM) in Semarang
- Radio Al Khairat (RAL FM) in Manado
- Radio Menara Tinggar (Menara FM) in Bali

== Malaysia ==
- Era in Kuala Terengganu, Terengganu

== United Kingdom ==
- Hot Radio in Dorset
- Capital Midlands in Derbyshire
- Nation Radio North East in County Durham
- Heart North and Mid Wales in Welshpool
- Heart South in Kent
- MFR in Keith
- Greatest Hits Radio Cornwall in West Cornwall
- Canalside in Cheshire
- Tay FM in Dundee
- Hits Radio Herefordshire & Worcestershire in Worcestershire
- Capital Manchester and Lancashire in Chorley
- YO1 Radio in York
