= 103.0 FM =

FM radio frequency

The following radio stations broadcast on FM frequency 103.0 MHz:

== Israel ==
- 103fm in Gush Dan

== United Kingdom ==
- Capital North West and North Wales in Anglesey
- Greatest Hits Radio Dumfries & Galloway in Kirkcudbright
- Heart West in Bath and Weston-super-Mare
- Hits Radio Manchester in Manchester
- Isles FM in the Outer Hebrides
- Nation Radio Scotland in Dumbarton
- Northsound 1 in Peterhead
