= L107 =

Coordinates: 55.7756°N 4.0476°W

Scotland
- Broadcast area: Lanarkshire
- Frequencies: 107.5 & 107.9 MHz; Online

Programming
- Format: Contemporary and new music

Ownership
- Owner: The Creative Media Group

History
- First air date: 19 November 2005
- Last air date: 11 November 2010

L107 was a Scottish Independent Local Radio station, serving Lanarkshire. The station broadcast on 107.5 and 107.9 FM from studios and offices in Hamilton.

== History ==
L107 replaced '107 The Edge', which was originally launched as "Clan FM" from 1999 until 2003, when it was saved from closure by the Kingdom Radio Group and rebranded. Within two years, the station was again saved from closure by former BBC Radio 1 and Radio Clyde presenter Mark Page (founder of the UK forces station Garrison Radio), who led its relaunch as L107, a full service local station.

The station closed at 10 am on 18 August 2008 but was again saved and reopened at 9 am on 26 August 2008 following a buyout and continued broadcasting for a further two years.

The station went off air for almost a week on 30 April 2010 when its main transmitter was removed from its Hamilton site.

After a period of a week of dead air followed by several days of automated music and commercials, L107's licence was handed back to the broadcasting regulator Ofcom on Thursday 11 November 2010. Earlier that month, the regulator had recorded a breach of format against the station regarding its local news output.
