= Delta FM =

- England
- Broadcast area: East Hampshire; South West Surrey; North West Sussex
- Frequencies: 97.1, 101.6, 101.8 and 102.0 MHz

Programming
- Format: Local radio playing a mix of current and classic hits

Ownership
- Owner: Tindle Radio

History
- First air date: January 1990; 36 years ago
- Last air date: 3 June 2010; 16 years ago

Delta FM was an Independent Local Radio station, broadcasting to East Hampshire, South West Surrey and North West Sussex. The station provided local news, community information, and specialist music programming to the towns of Alton, Bordon, Four Marks, Haslemere, Hindhead, Liphook, Midhurst and Petersfield.

== Background ==
The original Delta Radio first broadcast in January 1990. It was the brainchild of County Sound CEO, Mike Powell who successfully lobbied the Independent Broadcasting Authority for permission to put separate programming for the Haslemere district on what was originally intended to be a relay transmitter for Guildford's County Sound. The station was launched by County Sound's Terry Mann, formerly Programme Director of Radio 210, Reading.

After County Sound merged with Radio Mercury to form Allied Radio, Delta Radio was closed down by its new owners in 1992 and the transmitter went back to being a relay. However, when Mike Powell's UKRD Group won the Guildford licence (after it came up for renewal), Delta Radio was relaunched in 1996. Wey Valley Radio had already been operating as a full-time service in nearby Alton and Four Marks since 1992. This station was launched as a "community" station by David Way and Paul Mann after years of campaigning for such a licence and a first test broadcast in 1991 from the offices of the Alton Herald as part of the Radio Cracker restricted service licence. It was acquired by UKRD in 1994.

The decision to merge the two stations operationally was made in 1998 and the Wey Valley service was renamed Delta, and then in 2000, the Haslemere licence (which had previously been a part of the Surrey and North East Hampshire franchise) was merged with the Alton licence to finally form a single radio station.

Tindle Radio took over from UKRD as a major shareholder in the station in June 2003, a change which resulted in the closure of the Alton studios at Prospect Place, Mill Lane, with resulting consolidation at the Haslemere studios.

== Transmitters ==
Due to the geographical conditions, Delta Radio used five transmitters to cover its transmission area, which broadcast on four separate frequencies. The 97.1 FM transmitter was situated at the Holy Cross Hospital in Haslemere and served Haslemere, Midhurst and the surrounding area.

Two transmitters operated on 101.6 FM. The first of these was situated in Medstead which is close to Four Marks. This transmitter covers the West of the Delta FM transmission area. The second operated from the Hindhead crossroads on the A3 and operated as an "in-fill" between the service areas of the 97.1 and 102 transmitters.

A transmitter on 101.8 served Petersfield and the surrounding area. This transmitter was added in 2003 after many years of campaigning. The final transmitter, on 102, operated from Holybourne near to Alton. This transmitter could be heard from Farnham to Four Marks and also covered Bordon.

== Closure ==
On 29 April 2010, it was announced that Delta Radio would co-locate and merge with Kestrel FM in Basingstoke and share some programming. However, after the relocation, only a regional breakfast continued. After many weeks of trails announcing "Kestrel is coming", Delta Radio was replaced by Kestrel FM at 9 am on 3 June 2010.
