= Airport Information Radio =

Airport radio station in London

- London; United Kingdom
- Broadcast area: Heathrow and Gatwick airports
- Frequency: 1584 kHz

Programming
- Language: English
- Format: Airport radio

Ownership
- Owner: Allied Radio

History
- First air date: 25 June 1990
- Last air date: 11 February 1992

Airport Information Radio (AIR) was a short-lived British AM radio station which provided airport information for London Heathrow and Gatwick airports. It broadcast on medium-wave frequency 1584 kHz and was owned by Radio Mercury, eventually under the aegis of Allied Radio plc.

== History ==
In July 1989, Radio Mercury beat out four other bidders at the Independent Broadcasting Authority for the right to establish a radio service for Heathrow and Gatwick airports as part of the final batch of incremental radio licences. Radio Mercury's chairman, John Aumonier, got the idea while visiting Walt Disney World, which had a similar facility for visitors.

Airport Information Radio started broadcasting on 25 June 1990. The Heathrow service was originally a separate operation in Hounslow before its merger with the Gatwick service. The transmitters were separate at each site. An attempt to site the Gatwick transmitter at Povey Cross Road in Horley was rebuffed by local residents; the company eventually secured a location behind the Gatwick Penta Hotel.

The station broadcast live between 5 am and 11 pm daily, featuring departures and arrivals information, travel news and weather information. Outside of these times, a pre-recorded service with basic airport information was broadcast. Flight news, road news, terminal information and currency exchange rates were broadcast in 10-minute cycles. This was later updated and a complete hour clock was introduced, which would provide more information and lighter subjects such as in-flight entertainment reviews. The only airline to buy airtime was South African Airways. Mercury later awarded the contract to sell the station's advertising to the Radio Sales Company, a subsidiary of Yorkshire Television.

From 18 November 1991, live travel and news updates were discontinued in favour of a taped service of general airport information. The Radio Authority, successor to the Independent Broadcasting Authority, allowed the station to remain on the air through 31 January 1992 in spite of breaching its promise of performance conditions in order to give its owner, Allied Radio, time "to take decisions about the future of the service". Due to continued losses which Allied attributed to a recession in the advertising market, the station closed down on 11 February 1992.
