= Valleys Radio =

Coordinates: 51.7477°N 3.1960°W

Wales
- Broadcast area: Heads of South Wales Valleys
- Frequencies: 1116 kHz, 999 kHz
- Branding: For The Heart Of South Wales

Programming
- Format: Adult Contemporary

Ownership
- Owner: UTV Radio
- Sister stations: 96.4 The Wave; Swansea Sound

History
- First air date: 23 November 1996
- Last air date: 30 April 2009

Links
- Website: "Valleys Radio - For The Heart Of South Wales". Archived from the original on 26 May 2008.

Valleys Radio was an Independent Local Radio station broadcasting to the heads of the South Wales Valleys. The broadcast area was covered by two transmitters, 999 kHz from the Aberdare transmitter, and 1116kHz from the Ebbw Vale transmitter, with the Ebbw Vale signal being the comparatively stronger of the two.

== History ==
Owners Wireless Group were offered FM frequencies for The Heads of the Valleys they wanted to share programming with neighbouring service Swansea Sound and relocate Swansea Sound to a new media centre in Neath. Wireless applied to extend Swansea Sound West as well and applied for a licence to broadcast from transmitters in Carmarthenshire at Llanelli Carmel and Carmarthen. But due to ownership rules the applications were refused by Ofcom. FM transmissions were not initiated in the area.

On 20 March 2009, UTV Radio announced Valleys Radio was to be sold or shut down within the next 4 weeks. On Thursday 30 April 2009 at 10am, Valleys Radio ceased transmitting, after many listener messages, emotional speeches and farewells from radio producers and presenters. The final song aired was "Our last song together" by Neil Sedaka, on the final radio show, which was called Mark Powell @ Breakfast.

== Presenters/Producers (over the years) ==
These included Gareth Williams, Karen Brown, Bernie Keith, Dafydd Phillips, Steve Powell, Patrick Downes, Tony Peters, Mark Powell, John Curtis, Keri Jones, Simon Hawkins, Jo Price, Dave Bowen, Steve Johnson, Mike Parker.

== Music ==
The station mainly featured a strong variety of current and classic hits. The station also ran an online 'Music Academy' which allowed listeners to feedback on the music played by the station via the Valleys Radio website.

== Sister Stations ==
Two sister stations, Swansea Sound (Now Greatest Hits Radio South Wales) and The Wave - which broadcast to the Swansea area are still active. Some previous and current presenters from these two stations have broadcast on Valleys Radio.
