= Mike Powell (radio executive) =

British musician

Mike Powell is a British former newspaper and radio journalist who hosted shows on several UK music radio stations before transitioning to station management.

Powell moved to Guildford, Surrey in 1983 as launch News Editor of County Sound Radio. He was promoted to Program Director from 1984 to 1986 and then CEO from 1986 to 1991 - growing the group to four radio stations. His innovations at County Sound included being the first UK radio station to use RCS (Radio Computing Services) Selector music-scheduling software 24 hours a day and introducing the UK's first gold format radio station (County Sound Gold). Powell designed the programming for award-winning station, Fox FM - a joint venture with Capital Radio (London).

In 2001 Powell became Chairman of Infinity Media which then separated from UKRD to concentrate on digital platform technologies.

In October 2002, he joined RCS as Vice President of its International division, based at its World Headquarters in White Plains, New York. In October 2014 he was promoted to Senior Vice President International Operations and Chief Compliance Officer.
