= Mark Page =

English radio presenter

Mark Page (born 1958 in Middlesbrough) is a former English radio presenter, former Middlesbrough Football Club stadium announcer and convicted child sex offender. Between 1983 and 1987, he was the presenter of the BBC Radio 1 early weekend Breakfast Show.

== Career ==
=== Early career and BBC Radio 1 ===
Page started his career as a radio presenter on BBC Radio Cleveland in 1975. He later hosted the Breakfast Show on Radio Tees from 1978 to 1983. When Pat Sharp left Radio 1 in 1983, Page was offered the 6–8 am slot on weekend mornings and titled the show Me Mark Page. The Radio 1 show included humorous chat interspersed with music. He also did a stint presenting on Friday afternoons while Steve Wright presented on Sunday mornings as well as hosting the afternoon show from Monday to Thursday.

In 1987, he left Radio 1 and began working for independent radio stations.

=== After Radio 1 ===
Returning to independent radio, Page began broadcasting for Clyde FM and fronted the weekend Breakfast Show on Aire FM in Leeds. He was awarded the International Radio Personality of the Year at the New York Radio Awards in 1990 for Clyde FM and the following year he was awarded the Sony Gold Award, for Britain's Best Breakfast show – Aire FM in Leeds.

=== Later career ===
Following a long association with Forces Broadcasting, in 2001 Page founded the army base radio Garrison FM, where he presented the Saturday lunchtime slot until the station was taken over by BFBS in 2013.

In 2013, Page announced he was seeking backers in local business to support a bid to seek a commercial radio licence for Teesside, after TFM closed its Teesside Studio and merged broadcast operations with its sister station Metro Radio in Newcastle. Page was the Middlesbrough FC stadium announcer for 20 years.

=== Sexual offences conviction ===
In 2021, it was announced that Page would go on trial in 2022 for attempting to incite or cause an underage girl to engage in sexual activity and arranging or facilitating sexual exploitation of children in the Philippines. Page denied the allegations, which were alleged to have happened in 2016. He was found guilty at Teesside Crown Court in March 2022 and sentenced to 12 years in prison. This was later raised to 18 years by three Court of Appeal judges who said the original term was unduly lenient.
