= River FM =

Coordinates: 55.8860°N 3.5222°W

- Scotland
- Broadcast area: West Lothian
- Frequencies: 103.4 MHz, 107.7 MHz

Programming
- Format: Contemporary Hits

Ownership
- Owner: Kingdom Radio Group

History
- First air date: 1 September 2003
- Last air date: 29 January 2007

River FM was a radio station serving West Lothian, Scotland. The radio station was based at Livingston FC's stadium in the centre of the town. It played a range of hit music and older classics. Despite the limited area officially covered, it could sometimes be picked up as far away as Kilmarnock, Dundee and Stirling.

== Presenters ==
Some of the many past presenters are: Jimmy Young, Pete Smith, Dave Ross, Vicky Pichters, Rod Johnston, Donny Hughes, Scotty B, Gus Bain and Dave McIntosh, John Burns, Ryan Morrison, Scott Laing, Alex Boyd, Charlie Mac, Elanie Notman, Keith Crombie, Keith Reid, Paul Scott, Steve Hamilton, Jana Ramos, Katie Burnett to name a few.

The lineup immediately prior to closure consisted of Daily (Breakfast Show), Barry Snedden (Hits and Headlines and mid morning show), Paul Scott (Drivetime), Colin Young (Evenings), Rod Johnston (Saturday Breakfast Show), Grant Thomson, Keith Crombie, Colin Jackson, Gordon Hunter & Daimen Richards (Sunday Afternoons). Hit40UK could also be heard Sunday afternoons from 4 p.m.

== Attempted sale by Kingdom Group and subsequent closure ==
In December 2006, the station went up for sale. The station is believed to have been unprofitable, and Kingdom Group's Board of Directors decision raised a big question over the station's future, and even its existence.

On Monday 29 January 2007, at 15:00 GMT, River FM went into automation, with live programming going out as normal up until this point. With no offers to buy the station, at Kingdom's deadline of 18:00 on the same day the station shut down, with the last song being Nelly Furtado "All Things Come to an End". The radio presenters and staff did not know about the shutdown of the company until 17:00 that same day, just one hour before the station closed and handed back their licence.

== Sources ==
- Plunkett, John (30 January 2007). "Ofcom may relax rules for small stations". The Guardian.
- "River FM on the lookout for staff". Press Gazette.
- "End of the road for River FM". RadioToday. 29 January 2007.
