= Garrison FM =

Network of radio stations

Coordinates: 54°22′36″N 1°43′15″W

Garrison FM was a network of radio stations in the United Kingdom serving British Army bases around the country between 2001 and 2013. The stations broadcast a mixture of music, news, and chat, their emphasis being to bring news of military-related issues to soldiers and their families, as well as the wider public in general. The stations' licences were taken over by the British Forces Broadcasting Service in 2013.

== History ==
The network was founded in 2001 by former BBC Radio 1 disc jockey Mark Page, and came into being after an Army Communications initiative to establish a radio service for its troops in the UK. With a remit to provide news and entertainment to soldiers and their families, the station also enabled those posted on active service to stay in contact with their families.

Garrison FM expanded to serve several military bases, including Catterick, Aldershot, Edinburgh and Colchester. On 26 January 2012, Garrison FM switched on two more transmitters in Inverness, making the city the second in Scotland to receive the service after Edinburgh.

In 2012, the Ministry of Defence requested tenders for a ten-year contract to provide forces' broadcasting both at home and overseas. The contract was awarded to BFBS, the overseas incumbent, which from March 2013 took over all six Garrison stations, adding them to the four it already ran in Northern Ireland. BFBS continues to operate the six stations as part of their UK Bases network.
