= Pennine FM =

- England
- Broadcast area: Huddersfield
- Frequency: 107.9 MHz

Programming
- Format: Contemporary/classic hits

Ownership
- Owner: Pennine Media Ltd

History
- First air date: 1 March 1998
- Last air date: 5 April 2010

Pennine FM was an Independent Local Radio station based at Lockwood Park in Huddersfield, West Yorkshire, England. The station closed on 5 April 2010 and returned its licence to the industry regulator Ofcom.

== Background ==
The station was originally launched as Huddersfield FM by the Minster Sound Radio Group plc in October 1999. The station was bought by Radio Investments Limited and GWR in November 1999, then completely by Radio Investments (now The Local Radio Company) in December 2000 and renamed Home 107.9. It was broadcast from studios at The Old Stableblock, Lockwood Park, Huddersfield. Though popular music was the staple, community output was prominent on the station with content reflecting the diversity of the local communities.

In February 2008, Home 107.9 was rebranded as The New Pennine FM, and by June 2008 it had left The Local Radio Company profile and was taken over independently. However, they still took some of TLRC's networked shows such as The Lunchtime Gameshow broadcast from Minster FM in York on Sundays at 12 noon, hosted by John Harding and Russ Leighton.

On 16 April 2009, The New Pennine FM was put into administration and taken off the air. It is understood that the owners were heavily in debt to Huddersfield Rugby Union Football Club which leased their premises to the station. In the weeks following the station closure, the 107.9 frequency continued to play the Pennine FM backup disc from their transmitter. Ofcom noted this breach in their Bulletin Issue.

On 7 May 2009, the station was bought by Pennine Media Ltd. The new owners appointed Jonathan Gold as Programme Director and Dave Stankler as Commercial Director. The station was then branded as Pennine FM, Huddersfield's More Music Station, and aimed at 25- to 45-year-olds, playing a mix of classic and current hits.

== 2010 closure ==
On 5 April 2010, it was announced on air that Pennine FM will close at 10 pm that day and that the licence will be handed back to Ofcom. The station closed four hours earlier, at 6 pm, and the last song played was "Sleeping Satellite" by Tasmin Archer. A test tone was heard immediately after the final sweeper.

== Technical ==
The signal was at a relatively low power (100w vertical polarization, 100w horizontal polarization) and was broadcast from a transmitter at a site owned by Yorkshire Electricity Distribution PLC (YEDL) at Ainley Top, near the M62. The signal power was low to protect the aircraft communication band. The RDS name was PENNINE

== Branding ==
Huddersfield FM's jingle packages were produced by JAM Creative Productions and Steve England.

In January 2007, when the station was still Home 107.9, they began using a jingle package produced by the Bespoke Music Company, as did many other stations owned by the Local Radio Company. To complement the new jingles, the station's strap line was changed from music:fun:life to from Huddersfield with West Yorkshire's greatest hits.

When the station became Pennine FM, another batch of idents were produced by JonesTM which incorporated "the New Pennine FM" moniker.
