= Mersey 106.7 =

Coordinates: 53.4001°N 2.8155°W

KCR FM 106.7
- England
- Broadcast area: Knowsley, Merseyside
- Frequency: 106.7 MHz

Programming
- Format: Contemporary

Ownership
- Owner: KCR Media

History
- First air date: 16 June 2001
- Last air date: 1 April 2009

Links
- Website: KCR FM

Mersey 106.7 was an independent local radio station for the Knowsley area just outside Liverpool, England.

== Origins ==
KCR 106.7 was originally launched by Steve Dickson and Ray Ferguson, with financial backing of Chrysalis. It was sold to The Local Radio Company (TLRC) who embarked upon a rebranding and relaunch. In 2006, it was sold back to Ray Ferguson who reverted to the name KCR, and having to sell the station again, this time to Polaris Media in August 2008 but the sale was reneged two months later with KCR Media (the previous owners) using a clause to gain the company and station back after finding another person willing to back the ill-fated venture.

== The Rocket ==
During the period between the takeover and the relaunch, many of the original volunteer presenters and some minority specialist music shows were taken off the air, and replaced with paid professionals.

The Rocket broadcast TLRC's Musicfunlife format. The name 'Rocket' refers to Stephenson's Rocket, a locomotive which was the first passenger locomotive in the world, after winning the 'Rainhill Trials'.

The Station's news output was better during TLRC's ownership of the station however TLRC Group ran into financial difficulties, and sold the station to a group of local businessmen, who included some of the original investors,

== Return to KCR ==
In 2007 the name 'The Rocket' was dropped and the station was once again re-branded 106.7 KCR FM .

The station was then forced to relocate from its original base in the Cables Retail Park in Prescot, due to redevelopment, to new studios situated on Paramount Studios, Paramount Business Park just off Wilson Road in Huyton.

KCR FM was purchased on 19 August orchestrated handover from the previous owners KCR Media who took the station to near bankruptcy.

== KCR FM Problems ==
On 24 October 2008, KCR FM were locked out of the building by bailiffs acting on behalf of landlords "Brookhouse", after attempts to retrieve unpaid rent. All equipment and assets of the company were seized that morning, and the station was put onto automation. KCR FM have yet to comment on the situation and future of the station.

A notice was placed upon the front door of the studio reading "Landlords have taken peaceful possession of the property and the locks have been changed as a result of persistent breaches of the former lease. Access can only be allowed with the consent of the landlords".

On 28 October, KCR FM was handed a yellow card by UK regulator Ofcom, for not fulfilling its format. The regulator was quoted as saying "It is clear the station is at present broadcasting no local content, information or news as required by its Format."

== Mersey 106.7 ==
KCR's transmitter on 106.7 was turned off around lunchtime on Thursday, 27 November 2008.

Broadcasting began on 106.7 again on Thursday, 22 January 2009, under the new name "Mersey 106.7 - Great Songs for Liverpool".

On Wednesday 1 April 2009, the licence for Mersey 106.7 was officially revoked. This unprecedented move was initially announced back in December 2008 but had taken nearly four months to be put into action. Programmes went out as normal until after the 4pm news, when the song "Breaking Up is Hard to Do" by Neil Sedaka was broadcast. Then it went to dead air.
