= DevonAir =

- Exeter; England
- Broadcast area: East Devon, Exeter and Torbay
- Frequencies: 97.0/96.4/103 FM and 666/954 AM

History
- First air date: 7 November 1980
- Last air date: 31 December 1994

DevonAir Radio was the Independent Local Radio station serving East Devon, Exeter and Torbay.

== History ==
On 27 March 1978, the Independent Broadcasting Authority invited applicants for the licence to serve the Exeter and Torbay area. Three applicants came forward – Bay City Radio in Exeter, Radio Haldon Limited in Torquay and Riviera Radio in Paignton. The IBA awarded the licence to Radio Haldon Limited on 16 June 1979. The licensee name was changed to DevonAir Radio Limited on 4 October 1979.

On 7 November 1980, DevonAir began broadcasting to Exeter and mid-Devon from its studios at St Davids Hill in the city. The first presenter on air was Bob Kingsley, who opened the station with its first song Here Comes the Sun by The Beatles. On 12 December 1980, the station opened new studios above a former ballroom and nightclub at Harbour Point in Torquay. DevonAir became the first twin radio station in the UK, hence the on air branding of Double DevonAir.

In 1987, the station was acquired by London-based Capital Radio. In 1989, the Home Office granted permission for broadcasting on a new relay transmitter at Stockland Hill, allowing DevonAir's signal to be heard in East Devon, West Dorset and South Somerset. The relay broadcast on 103 FM from 4 July 1989, under the name of South West 103.

In 1991, the Bristol-based GWR Group bought a stake in DevonAir meaning it was now part-owned by two large radio groups. The station was relaunched on 9 November 1992 as the New DevonAir FM with the slogan "Devon's Better Music Station" – a change which coincided with the departure of several presenters as a result of a change in format.

DevonAir's broadcast licence went up for renewal in 1993 with two further groups bidding to take over – Gemini Radio (owned by Somerset-based Orchard Media) and Wild West Radio. The Radio Authority requested more time to make a decision on the licence award – Wild West Radio was ruled out of the final shortlist before on 8 October 1993, the authority announced that Gemini would takeover DevonAir's licence from 1 January 1995. The winning franchise had proposed to broadcast two separate services on the FM and medium wave frequencies while DevonAir proposed to continue with a sole service, claiming it had maintained a listenership of around 80,000 listeners because of simultaneous broadcasting.

The station ended broadcasting at 1pm on 31 December 1994 following an hour-long retrospective programme presented by Paul Saunders. The last song played on DevonAir was The Sun Ain't Going to Shine Anymore by The Walker Brothers. Up until midnight on 1 January 1995, the station aired pre-recorded music leading up to the handover of Gemini FM.

DevonAir's successor Gemini FM (later rebranded as Heart Exeter and Heart Torbay) continued to broadcast until 27 August 2010, when it was merged with four Heart Network stations in north & south Devon and the South Hams to form a single county-wide Heart station, broadcasting from Exeter and London.

On 1 March 2024 East Devon Radio changed its name to DevonAir Radio and the heritage name returned to the airwaves after co-founder and station manager, Andy Green secured the “DevonAir Radio” brand.

== Notable presenters ==
DevonAir Radio presenters included: Bob Kingsley, Paul Owens, Travis Baxter, John Pierce, Ian Waugh, John Reynolds, John Brocks, Gordon Sommerville, Tim Arnold, Mike Powell, Glen Richards, David Lowe, Stephen Ayres, James Lee, David FitzGerald, Kevin Kane & Keri Jones.
