= Allied Radio plc =

British radio company

Allied Radio plc was a publicly listed radio company that operated, or held an interest in, several Independent Local Radio contractors in the UK during the 1990s.

== History ==
Allied Radio plc was created when the Crawley-based Independent Local Radio station, Radio Mercury plc merged with the Guildford-based ILR contractors, County Sound plc in August 1991. The new company initially broadcast six stations to an area covering Guildford and Haslemere, (Ex-County Sound) Crawley and Horsham (Ex-Radio Mercury) and Gatwick and Heathrow Airports (Airport Information Radio). Live presentation on Airport Information Radio was stopped in favour of a pre-recorded service, on 18 November 1991, and the station was closed by Allied Radio in February 1992. The remaining stations were consolidated into an FM station, Radio Mercury FM, with County Sound Radio AM being the name for the combined AM service (although this became Mercury Extra within a year).

Allied Radio held a stake in Midlands Radio plc, who owned BRMB, Mercia FM, Trent FM, Leicester Sound, GEM AM and Xtra AM. Midlands Radio plc was taken over by Capital Radio plc in 1993.

Birmingham Country Radio, who applied for the Birmingham incremental station licence (held at that time by Buzz FM) in February 1994, were backed by Allied Radio plc. Birmingham Country Radio were unsuccessful and the licence was awarded to Choice FM who went on air on 1 January 1995.

In April 1994, Allied Radio announced plans for a capital reconstruction and a rights issue. Shares were suspended at 10 ½ p, at the company's request, pending the publication of accounts and clarification of the company's financial position.

Fortune 1458 AM went on-air on 20 June 1994 with Allied Radio increasing their stake in the company at the end of October 1994.

Meanwhile, the Mercury stations were experiencing a sharp reduction in listeners (especially on the former County Sound frequencies) at the same time as the Guildford licences were due to come to an end. The new Guildford licence was won by the UKRD Group subsidiary; Surrey and North East Hampshire Radio Ltd, and Allied Radio sold the last seven months of its Guildford licence (originally due to end in April 1996) to the incoming company for £192,500 on 17 August 1995.

Allied Radio was taken over by Independent Radio Group plc in March 1996.

== Operations ==
=== Holdings ===
- Radio Mercury plc

Independent Local Radio Contractor for Reigate and Crawley.

- County Sound plc

Independent Local Radio Contractor for Guildford and Haslemere.

- Fortune 1458 Ltd

Independent Local Radio Contractor for Manchester.

- Country 1035 (Originally London Country Radio)

Independent Local Radio Contractor for London (Consortium Member).

- Midlands Radio plc

Independent Local Radio Group in the Midlands.

- Birmingham Country Radio

Birmingham Incremental Station Licence Applicant (Backers).

=== Staff ===
Included:

- John Aumonier – Group Managing Director (1992), Non-Executive Director (1992 onwards)
- Martin Campbell – Station Programme Controller
- Nicholas Change - Group Development Director (1992), Non-Executive Director (1992 onwards)
- Andrew Dean – Sales Controller (1991–1995)
- Tim Gill
- Neil Macadam – Sales Controller (1995–1996)
- Peter S Perry – Managing Director
- Ken Pritchard-Jones – Chairman (1991–1994)
- Martyn Rose
- Brian Rowbotham – Chairman (1994–1996)
- Peter Saunders – Non-Executive Director
- John Wellington – Group Programme Director
- Dan Wright – Commercial Producer

=== Offices ===
Allied Radio plc was based at the original Radio Mercury studios at Broadfield House, Crawley.

== Ownership ==
The French radio network, Europe 1 held a stake in Allied Radio plc.

== Allied Radio plc Today ==
- Radio Mercury plc

DMG Radio agreed to buy Radio Mercury plc (by then, Radio Mercury Ltd) from the Independent Radio Group plc on 20 November 1998 for £3.75 million. The deal was completed after Radio Authority approval on 8 February 1999.

Fame 1521 became Breeze 1521 in 1999, an opt-out of Breeze 1359 and 1431 AM in Essex (also owned by DMG Radio). Mercury FM and Breeze 1521 came under the ownership of GWR Group in 2000. GWR renamed Breeze 1521, for the fifth time in nine years, to Classic Gold Breeze 1521 in January 2001.

Later in 2001, Classic Gold Breeze 1521 was sold, yet again, to along with several other Classic Gold Stations to UBC. Under UBC, the name was later adjusted to Classic Gold 1521.

Mercury FM came under the ownership of GCap Media plc, when GWR Group plc merged with Capital Radio plc in May 2005. GCap also reacquired the Classic Gold Network in April 2007 (these stations had originally been own by GCap predecessor GWR Group plc), renaming it simply ‘Gold’ on 3 August 2007. Thus Classic Gold 1521 became Gold Sussex and Surrey.

Mercury FM and Gold Sussex and Surrey were purchased owned by Global Radio who acquired GCap Media plc on 31 March 2008. Mercury FM was closed on 26 July 2010, and the former Mercury FM frequencies now broadcast a new service called Heart Sussex and Surrey.

- County Sound plc

After the sale to Surrey and North East Hampshire Radio Ltd, all services were renamed County Sound Radio with the 96.4 FM service becoming 96.4 The Eagle on 4 January 1996, the 97.1 FM service becoming Delta Radio on 9 May 1996 and the 1476 AM service keeping the County Sound Radio name. The AM frequency was changed to 1566 kHz in 1999. Delta Radio merged with Wey Valley Radio in Alton in November 1998 and the station, renamed Delta FM, was sold to Tindle Newspaper Group. Into the 2010s, County Sound Radio and 96.4 The Eagle were still owned by UKRD Group and were based at Dolphin House, Guildford. but 96.4 The Eagle became Greatest Hits Radio in 2020 and the County Sound AM frequency has carried Premier Christian Radio, a Christian radio station which is more widely available on DAB, since 2014.
