= Heart Exeter and Heart Torbay =

Former British Independent Local Radio stations

Heart Devon

England
- Broadcast area: Exeter, Torbay, Plymouth, North and South Devon
- Frequencies: 96.4 MHz (Torquay and Torbay); 97.0 MHz (Exeter); 103.0 MHz (Cullompton and Sidmouth)

Programming
- Format: Hot AC

Ownership
- Owner: Global Radio

History
- First air date: 27 August 2010

Links
- Website: Heart Devon

Heart Exeter and Torbay were part of the Heart Network of commercial local radio stations operated by Global Radio in the United Kingdom. The stations were launched on 23 March 2009, and replaced Gemini FM, which was the previous commercial radio station for the Exeter and Torbay areas in Devon.

Heart Torbay transmitted from Beacon Hill, near Torbay on 96.4 MHz FM. Heart Exeter transmitted from Exeter St Thomas on 97.0 FM, and Stockland Hill, near Honiton on 103.0 FM. They were also available on DAB digital radio and online via their respective websites. Both stations were replaced by Heart Devon, broadcast from Exeter, on Friday 27 August 2010.

== History ==
=== DevonAir Radio ===
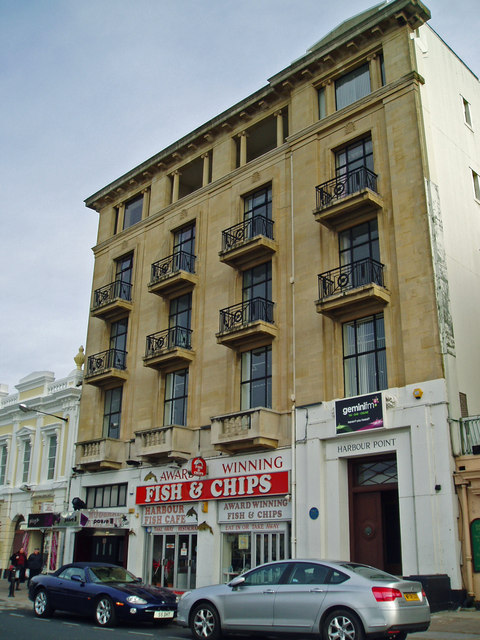
The Harbour Point studio building in Torquay

The first commercial local radio station for the Exeter and Torbay areas was DevonAir Radio, which was launched in November 1980. The station broadcast from studios in St. David's Hill, Exeter, and overlooking the harbour in Torquay. DevonAir was initially successful, but financial problems resulted in a takeover by Capital Radio in 1987. In October 1993 the station lost its franchise and closed on 31 December 1994, leading to the creation of Gemini FM.

=== Gemini FM ===
Launched on 1 January 1995, Gemini Radio was owned by the Orchard Media Group. The station was later bought by the GWR Group, which became part of GCap Media in May 2005. Gemini FM continued to broadcast from studios in Exeter and Torquay, although as with DevonAir, most of the programming was sourced from the studio in Exeter.

=== Heart rebranding ===
In September 2008, it was announced that Gemini FM was to become Heart as part of a national rebranding exercise by new owners Global Radio. Broadcasts from the Torquay harbourside studio ceased, and the programmes for both stations were produced at the studio in Exeter.

=== Network restructuring ===
On 21 June 2010, Global Radio announced that Heart Exeter and Torbay would be merged with Heart Plymouth, Heart North Devon and Heart South Devon as part of plans to reduce the Heart network of stations from 33 to 16. The new station, Heart South West, began broadcasting from Exeter on 27 August 2010.

DevonAir logo

Gemini FM logo from the GWR period

Gemini FM logo from The One Network period

== See also ==
- BBC Radio Devon
- Heart Plymouth
- Palm 105.5
