= Heart South West =

Radio station in Exeter, England

Heart Devon & Cornwall

Exeter; England
- Broadcast area: Barnstaple, Cornwall, Exeter, Plymouth, South Hams, Torbay
- Frequency: 96.2-107.0MHz, DAB: East Devon & Exeter 103.0MHz East Devon, 97.0MHz Exeter Torbay & South East Devon 96.4MHz The South Hams 100.5MHz Totnes, 100.8MHz Dartmouth, 101.2MHz Soar, 101.9MHz Ivybridge Plymouth 96.6MHz Tavistock, 97.0MHz Plymouth North Devon 96.2MHz, 97.3MHz Ilfracombe Cornwall 107.0MHz Redruth, 105.1MHz East Cornwall & West Devon
- Branding: This is Heart

Programming
- Format: Hot AC

Ownership
- Owner: Global

History
- First air date: 27 August 2010
- Last air date: 3 June 2019

Links
- Website: Barnstaple Cornwall Exeter Plymouth South Hams Torbay

Heart South West was a regional radio station owned and operated by Global Radio as part of the Heart network. It broadcast to Devon and Cornwall from studios in Exeter.

The station launched on Friday 27 August 2010 under the name 'Heart Devon', as a result of a merger between Heart Exeter and Heart Torbay (formerly Gemini FM), Heart Plymouth (formerly Plymouth Sound), Heart North Devon (formerly Lantern FM) and Heart South Devon (formerly South Hams Radio). On Monday 7 May 2012, the station merged again with Atlantic FM in Cornwall.

== History ==
The regional station originally broadcast as six separate stations - Plymouth Sound began broadcasting to Plymouth and surrounding areas in May 1975, Lantern Radio served North Devon from October 1992, Gemini FM broadcast separate services for East and South Devon from January 1995 onwards (DevonAir Radio served the dual-franchise area until losing its broadcast licence on New Year's Eve 1994) and South Hams Radio launched in the South Hams district of South Devon in December 1998. Atlantic FM began broadcasting to Cornwall from July 2006.

By 1999, Plymouth Sound, Gemini FM and Lantern FM were under the ownership of the GWR Group, which merged with the Capital Radio Group to form GCap Media six years later. In that same year, the stations were put up for sale as they were considered outside of the company's primary target area. In the event, the sale did not go ahead as all of the bids made fell short of expectations. In 2008, the group was taken over by Global Radio, which eventually took ownership of South Hams Radio as a joint venture with the UKRD Group. A year later, the stations were rebranded as Heart.

On 21 June 2010, Global Radio announced it would merge the five Devon stations as part of plans to reduce the Heart network of stations from 33 to 16. The new station began broadcasting on Friday 27 August 2010 from studios in Exeter, leading to the closure of studios in Plymouth, Torquay, Barnstaple and Kingsbridge.

On 19 March 2012, Global Radio announced it had bought Atlantic FM from joint owners Tindle Radio and Camel Media. Atlantic FM became part of the Heart Network and merged with Heart Devon on Monday 7 May 2012, forming Heart South West. In August 2012, Global Radio applied for a format change, to remove its commitment to speech content for the Heart Cornwall licence, however on 16 October 2012 this was rejected by media regulator Ofcom.

=== Station merger ===
On 26 February 2019, Global announced Heart South West would be merged with three sister stations in Bristol and Somerset, Gloucestershire and Wiltshire.

From 3 June 2019, local output will consist of a three-hour regional Drivetime show on weekdays, alongside localised news bulletins, traffic updates and advertising.

Heart South West's studios in Exeter closed with operations moving to Bristol - the station ceased local programming on 31 May 2019. Local breakfast and weekend shows were replaced with network programming from London.

Heart West began broadcasting regional programming on 3 June 2019.

== Availability and transmitters ==
=== Analogue (FM) ===
- Beacon Hill

96.4 MHz in Torquay, Paignton, Brixham and South East Devon

- Caradon Hill

105.1 MHz in East Cornwall

- Huntshaw Cross

96.2 MHz in Barnstaple
97.0 MHz in Plymouth and surrounding areas

- Redruth (Four Lanes)

107.0 MHz in West Cornwall

- Stockland Hill

103.0 MHz in Sidmouth

=== Digital (DAB) ===
Multiplex Name	Bitrate	Short Label	Long Label	Sld
NOW Exeter & Torbay	128kbit/s	Heart	Heart Devon	C369
NOW Plymouth	128kbit/s	Heart	Heart Plymouth	C869
NOW Cornwall	128kbit/s	Heart	Heart Cornwall	C36D
