= Heart North Devon =

Barnstaple; England
- Broadcast area: North Devon
- Frequencies: 96.2 MHz (North Devon); 97.3 MHz (Ilfracombe)

Programming
- Format: Hot AC

History
- First air date: 19 October 1992 (rebranded 23 March 2009)

Heart North Devon (formerly Lantern FM and previously Lantern Radio) was an Independent Local Radio station in North Devon.

== Technical ==
The station broadcast from two locations: its main transmitter at Huntshaw Cross on 96.2FM, and a relay station to cover the Ilfracombe area on 97.3FM. Both frequencies broadcast the same output.

== History ==
The station was originally known as Lantern Radio, taking its name from the local coastline, known as "the Lantern Coast" - smugglers would lure ships onto the rocks of the North Devon coast with lanterns, causing the ships to run aground and thus be able to be plundered.

Originally owned by a consortium of local businesspeople, Orchard Media (the owners of Somerset's Orchard FM) purchased the station during the mid-1990s.

GWR Group purchased the group in 1999 and later merged with the Capital Radio Group to form GCap Media. In November 2005, it was announced that GCap's local radio stations in the South West, including Lantern FM, were to be sold, as they lay outside the company's primary target area. However, no acceptable offer was made for the stations, and the sale was abandoned. GCap was itself later taken over by Global Radio.

Initially broadcasting from studios in Bideford, the station moved in 2000 to studios in Roundswell Business Park in Barnstaple, where the station's breakfast and drivetime shows were produced until its closure. Lantern FM was rebranded on 23 March 2009 as part of Global Radio's Heart Network. By this time, the majority of the station's programming was networked from the Heart Network's main studios in Leicester Square, London.

=== Network restructuring ===
On 21 June 2010, Global Radio announced plans to close Heart North Devon and merge the station with Heart Plymouth, Heart Exeter and Heart Torbay and Heart South Devon as part of plans to reduce the Heart network of stations from 33 to 16. The new regional station, Heart Devon, began broadcasting from Exeter on 27 August 2010.

=== Notable past presenters ===
- Amy Cole (now BBC Look North reporter, when it was Lantern FM.)
- Andy Garland (now BBC Radio Kent presenter, when it was Lantern FM.)
