= Star 107.9 =

England
- Broadcast area: Stroud, Gloucestershire
- Frequencies: 107.3 MHz, 107.9 MHz

Programming
- Format: Adult Contemporary

Ownership
- Owner: UKRD Group

History
- First air date: 29 November 1998
- Last air date: 29 September 2006

Star 107.9 was a UK Independent Local Radio station centred on the area of Stroud, in Gloucestershire, also broadcasting to other localities including Cirencester, Tetbury and Stonehouse, and Dursley on a 107.3 FM relay (originally 107.2 FM). The station was owned by the UKRD Group, and shared its programme controller, Brody Swain, and managing director Junie Lewis with Star 107.5 in Cheltenham.

== History ==
The station launched in 1998, originally known as "The Falcon". UKRD rebranded the station in 2002 as "Star 107", later becoming "Star 107.9" and then "Star Radio" in late 2005, based in premises in the Brunel Mall on London Road in Stroud.

=== Closure ===
The station ceased broadcasting on 29 September 2006 following a decision by UKRD to return the licence to the United Kingdom's broadcasting and telecommunications regulator, Ofcom. UKRD believed that it would be impossible for anyone to make the station profitable, which, according to figures, had been loss-making throughout its entire eight-year history.

The last song played on the station was Boy Meets Girl's "Waiting For a Star to Fall".

The Paul Ellery website, has exclusive footage of the final words spoken on the station, as well as pictures from the last week of the licence.

UKRD had applied to relocate the station to share the same building with nearby sister station Star 107.5 in Cheltenham and to introduce shared programming between the Stroud and Cheltenham stations in daytime hours. While Ofcom cleared the co-location of the two stations, it refused permission for programming sharing between the two stations, believed to be the catalyst for UKRD's decision to close the station altogether. Returning a licence to the broadcasting regulator had, until 21 September 2006, been unprecedented in the United Kingdom.
