= Hot Radio =

Coordinates: 50.7571°N 1.9238°W

- England
- Broadcast area: Poole
- Frequency: 102.8 MHz

Programming
- Format: Rhythmic & Chart

Ownership
- Owner: Community owned

History
- First air date: 8 November 2008

Links
- Website: wearehotradio.com

Hot Radio is a community radio station for Poole offering rhythmic music and local information.

The station started life as "The Bay 102.8" and was awarded a community radio licence by Ofcom in 2007 and began broadcasting at 00:01 on 8 November 2008. Community Radio stations in the UK are required to provide a social gain to the community they serve. Hot Radio is one of a growing number of such stations in the UK.

Based in Poole, Hot radio provides regular traffic & travel, job information, what's ons and other local information and interviews. The station plays a mix of music from the 90's to today including upbeat dance, funk, soul and RnB during normal daytime output. Hot radio also provides specialist programming evenings and weekends with local specialist DJs experienced within their music genre. The station also provides broadcasts from major local events.

The station covers The BCP Conurbation on FM 102.8, Dorset on DAB and its sister stations cover the whole of the South Coast on DAB as well as online, smart speakers and all radio apps, Mixcloud etc

Former branding

At 7:00am on 14 February 2012 "The Bay 102.8" re-branded to "Hot Radio 102.8". The last song played on The Bay 102.8 was "Never Can Say Goodbye" by The Communards.

The first song on Hot Radio was "Some Like It Hot" by The Power Station when Paul Stevens announced the new brand to listeners.

On 8 November 2013, Hot Radio was awarded a 5-year extension by ofcom to continue providing community radio to Poole. On 8 November 2018, Hot Radio was awarded another 5-year extension by ofcom to continue providing community radio to Poole.

On 6 February 2018, Hot Radio relaunched with a brand new sound and line up.

Hot Radio is also now available on DAB across Dorset. Since late 2020 it is also available on DAB across South Hampshire.

== Current daytime presenters ==
- Karl Davies & Holly Saunders - Hot Breakfast/Friday Frolics
- Niall Moloney – Mid-Mornings
- Glen - Afternoons
- Sparky – Hot's Big Drive Home

== Current weekday specialist/late night presenters ==
- Matt Black – Black On Track
- Elysa Marsden – The Road to Rock Radio Show
- Elysa & Dave - The Mixtape
- Glitterballs - The Weekend Warm Up

== Current weekend presenters ==
- Joe Kinch - Weekend Breakfast
- Chris Morley – Saturday Mornings
- Holly Saunders – Weekend Lunch
- Coco – Saturday Afternoons
- Clark - Hot Radio Dance
- Adam Bomb - Sweet As Candy (Saturday)
- Jay Rachet – Cafe Del Soul (Saturday)
- Angie Brown - Angie Brown House (Saturday)
- Niall Moloney – Sunday Mornings
- Kiri – Sunday Afternoons
