= Isles FM =

Radio station in Stornoway, Outer Hebrides

Coordinates: 58.2082°N 6.3800°W

- Stornoway; Scotland
- Broadcast area: Outer Hebrides
- Frequency: 103 MHz

Programming
- Format: Community info & mixed music

History
- First air date: 26 April 1994 (initial RSL); March 1998 (full-time)

Links
- Webcast: http://islesfm.reefnet.co.uk:8000/stream
- Website: islesfm.com

Isles FM is a local radio station operating from Stornoway in the Outer Hebrides, Scotland.

The station is operated entirely by a volunteer staff. Isles FM is the trading name of Western Isles Community Radio Limited, which owns all the equipment.

== History ==
The station's initially planned name, Radio nan Eilean, was objected to by the BBC due to potential confusion with a former local opt-out of BBC Radio Scotland of the same name, which had since merged into the Scotland-wide BBC Radio nan Gàidheal.

The station was initially set up in the living room of a local minister, Reverend Stanley Bennie, and operated for a few weeks at a time under a restricted service licence as a trial, with the first of these starting at 7:30 am on 26 April 1994 and ending on 25 July and another starting on 12 December 1994 for a period of 8 weeks.

After proving that the station was feasible, a permanent licence was granted by the UK Radio Authority (now Ofcom) and the station started operating on 1 March 1998 (with the current licence dating from 3 July of the same year). Bennie was removed as the station's managing director in 2000 after complaints were made over the lyrics of a song he repeatedly played, "The Bad Touch", caused offence, later being fired from the station in January 2001.

In 2013 the station relocated to custom-built premises in Seaforth Road, Stornoway. Its signal is broadcast from the island's largest transmitter site, Eitshal, with FM coverage across approximately 3/4 of the Island. The station also broadcasts live over the Internet on platforms such as Internetradiouk, and allows listeners to catch up via its replay website.

In January 2017, the station stopped broadcasting due to the transmitter malfunctioning following a power surge. It raised £8,000 for repairs through JustGiving, with contributors including the Hebridean Celtic Festival and Tesco, before airing again in April.

Many of the presenters are amateurs, although former presenter and current director Glenn Denny completed a VQ in Radio Broadcasting through Moray Firth Radio, which made him the only professionally trained presenter with Isles FM. Other notable volunteers with the station include Rodney Collins, who was formerly a journalist with Record Mirror went on to Radios 1 & 2 and was also a member of the Radio Luxembourg team in the 1970s before becoming managing director of ILR stations in Scotland and London. One of the younger members of Isles FM, Eilidh MacLennan, moved on to work for the BBC as a presenter on Gaelic children's television, Dè a-nis?.

== Programme content ==
The station broadcasts a variety of content. The mixture of Gaelic and English programming includes: specialist music, chat shows, children's programmes, and news. Every Sunday Isles FM broadcasts two Christian acts of worship, often from Churches across the Isles or from Isles 'expats' ministering across Scotland.

It is often a source of essential information in times of severe weather and other crises, when transport off the islands by ferry or air may be unavailable, or when roads may be closed.
