= Heart Plymouth =

Plymouth; England
- Broadcast area: Plymouth and surrounding areas
- Frequencies: FM: Tavistock; 96.6; Plymouth; 97.0; DAB: 12D (Plymouth)

Programming
- Format: Hot AC

History
- First air date: 19 May 1975
- Last air date: 27 August 2010

Heart Plymouth (formerly Plymouth Sound) was an Independent Local Radio station broadcasting to Plymouth in Devon, England.

== History ==
The heritage name Plymouth Sound was a pun on the popular meaning of sound (in the audio sense) and the bay of Plymouth Sound between Penlee Point and Wembury Point in Devon.

In November 2005, it was announced that GCap's local radio stations in the South West, including Plymouth Sound, were to be sold as they were outside of the company's primary target area. Four months later GCap decided that the sale would not go ahead, essentially because the offers made fell short of their expectations.

In September 2008, it was announced that Plymouth Sound would be rebranded Heart FM as part of a national rebranding exercise by owners Global Radio, which saw twenty-nine stations renamed as Heart. Plymouth Sound was rebranded as Heart Plymouth on Monday 23 March 2009. By this time, most of the station's programming was produced in London, with local programming broadcast at breakfast every day and at drivetime each weekday.

=== Network restructuring ===
On 21 June 2010, Global Radio announced plans to close Heart Plymouth and merge the station with Heart Exeter and Heart Torbay, Heart North Devon and Heart South Devon as part of plans to reduce the Heart network of stations from 33 to 16. The new station, Heart Devon, began broadcasting from Exeter on 27 August 2010.

== Cross Rhythms ==
The Christian media group and radio station Cross Rhythms grew out of a half-hour Christian music show on Plymouth Sound FM, which aired on Sunday evenings between 1983 and 1996. Initially called The Solid Rock of Jesus Christ, the show was renamed the Cross Rhythms Experience in 1992, and became a syndicated show in 1993. It was hosted by Chris Cole, the founder of Cross Rhythms.
