= County Sound Radio (1566 AM) =

Radio station in Guildford, UK

Coordinates: 51°14′26.26″N 0°34′53.8″W

Guildford; England
- Broadcast area: Guildford
- Frequency: AM: 1566 kHz

Programming
- Format: Contemporary

Ownership
- Owner: UKRD Group

History
- First air date: 4 April 1983
- Last air date: 2 April 2012
- Former frequencies: FM: 96.6 MHz; FM: 96.4 MHz; AM: 1476 kHz

Links
- Website: http://www.eagleextra.co.uk/

County Sound Radio was an Independent Local Radio station covering Surrey and north-east Hampshire in the United Kingdom. One of its closing forms in 2012–2014 formed Eagle Extra occupying 1566 MW following an internal split between older and newer music/features into two allied stations in 1988 and an incomplete takeover by Mercury FM then sale leaving a third station, that of Mercury, with enhanced coverage of this area and its successor Heart Sussex and Surrey. The post-1988 branch of the radio which was rooted in recent music, concerts and events in the area including for a younger audience alternated between three FM frequencies (96.6, 96.4 and 91.5); in 1996 it relaunched as 96.4 Eagle Radio.

== History ==
County Sound Radio was launched on 4 April 1983 by Frank Muir on 203 MW and 96.6 FM based at The Friary Shopping Centre in Guildford. In 1986, 96.6 changed to 96.4 FM.

It mainly used an FM transmitter on the Hog's Back section of the North Downs west of Guildford. The AM transmitter was next to the Portsmouth Direct Line in Farncombe, near Godalming.

=== Programmes ===
County Sound first aired weekdays 6am until 9pm, then until midnight. It went to 5am and/or 1am depending on day and schedule, before 24-hour service.

The original line-up included Phil Miles at Breakfast, Paul Owens, Sarah Lucas "after lunch" and Simon Cummings during the afternoon. Nigel Williams presented the evening show 96.6.

It featured long news broadcasts, County World, at lunchtime and 6pm. It took American Top 40 in the late 1980s.

=== Ownership and directors ===
Norman Cunningham was (company) Chairman. David Lucas was launch Managing Director and Mike Powell was the first Head of News. In year two, Powell became Programme Director. In year five Lucas left to become Managing Director of Ocean Sound and Powell became Managing Director.

In 1991 the group merged with Radio Mercury to form the listed plc, Allied Radio plc.

=== Theme jingle ===
The County Sound Radio theme was written by board member Les Reed (writer of hits including Delilah, The Last Waltz) with the slogan "The One and Only One for You". The lyrics to the County Sound song were:

Here comes the morning, it's a brand new day (Alt. lyrics for afternoon and evening: We are your music, and your news each day). Turn on the sunshine. The County Sound way. Open up your heart, and you will let a little sunshine through, with County Sound, the one and only one for you. We'll always be here, each and every day. Wherever you're going, we're going your way. Come with us and ride the airwaves discover something new, on County Sound - the one and only one for you. County Sound, the one and only one for you.

=== Promotional mascot ===
A costumed mascot was Brewster the Mouse who toured local fetes, funfairs and outdoor concerts.

=== 1988 to 1995 ===
On 1 June 1988, County Sound Radio used its FM and MW frequencies to create two stations, the first commercial station in the UK to do so.

1. 96.4 MHz became "County Sound Premier", "Premier Radio" and then on 4 May 1992 a 102.7 Reigate and Crawley shared edition of "Radio Mercury"
2. 1476 kHz became "County Sound Gold", later renamed "First Gold Radio" and then from 4 May 1992 a different County Sound originating from Crawley, West Sussex.

In 1989, the station moved most of its departments from its purpose-built studios on top of Guildford's "Friary Shopping Centre" to a new building in Chertsey Road, Woking. A small facility remained in the Centre's food court where shoppers could look directly into the on-air studio.

The FM frequences carried the West Surrey variant of Radio Mercury mainly programmed from the Friary Shopping Centre studio (Monday to Friday, 6am until 6.30pm). Weekend and overnight broadcasting came from Mercury's Crawley HQ in Sussex. The Haslemere area received additional frequency 97.1FM, enabling its own show 7am-11am, interspersing the main hours of broadcast.

Since 1986, Mercury's FM frequency changed from 103.6 to 102.7 as part of the UK-wide re-organisation of the VHF/FM band. 1989 saw a relay of the station added for the town of Horsham on 97.5. In 1991 the County Sound Radio Network was merged by owners Allied Radio in Guildford to form two brands Allied Radio plc.

Mercury then, having played a broad mix of music, became a mainly Top 40 hits station. County Sound's AM frequency was later renamed "Extra AM" and then again was shortly renamed to "Mercury Extra AM" to make the connection between the two AM frequencies of both stations better known. It also joined with Southend based Essex Radio and became known as Breeze under DMGT owned Essex Radio Group. In 2000, the GWR owned Classic Gold Network took over the AM licence of 1521 kHz. On 102.7, Mercury was renamed "Mercury FM" after the takeover of the group by IRG who had also rebranded medium wave, Fame 1521, in 1995. Before that Mercury had lost County Sound and Eagle Radio took the Surrey 96.4 FM transmitter, and County Sound returned to 1476 AM.

From 1992, news magazine The South Tonight broadcast on weekdays at 6.30pm on Mercury and County Sound. The programme was presented from Crawley; the Guildford news team gathered and pre-edited news for the areas north-west of Sussex.

=== 1995 to 2011 ===
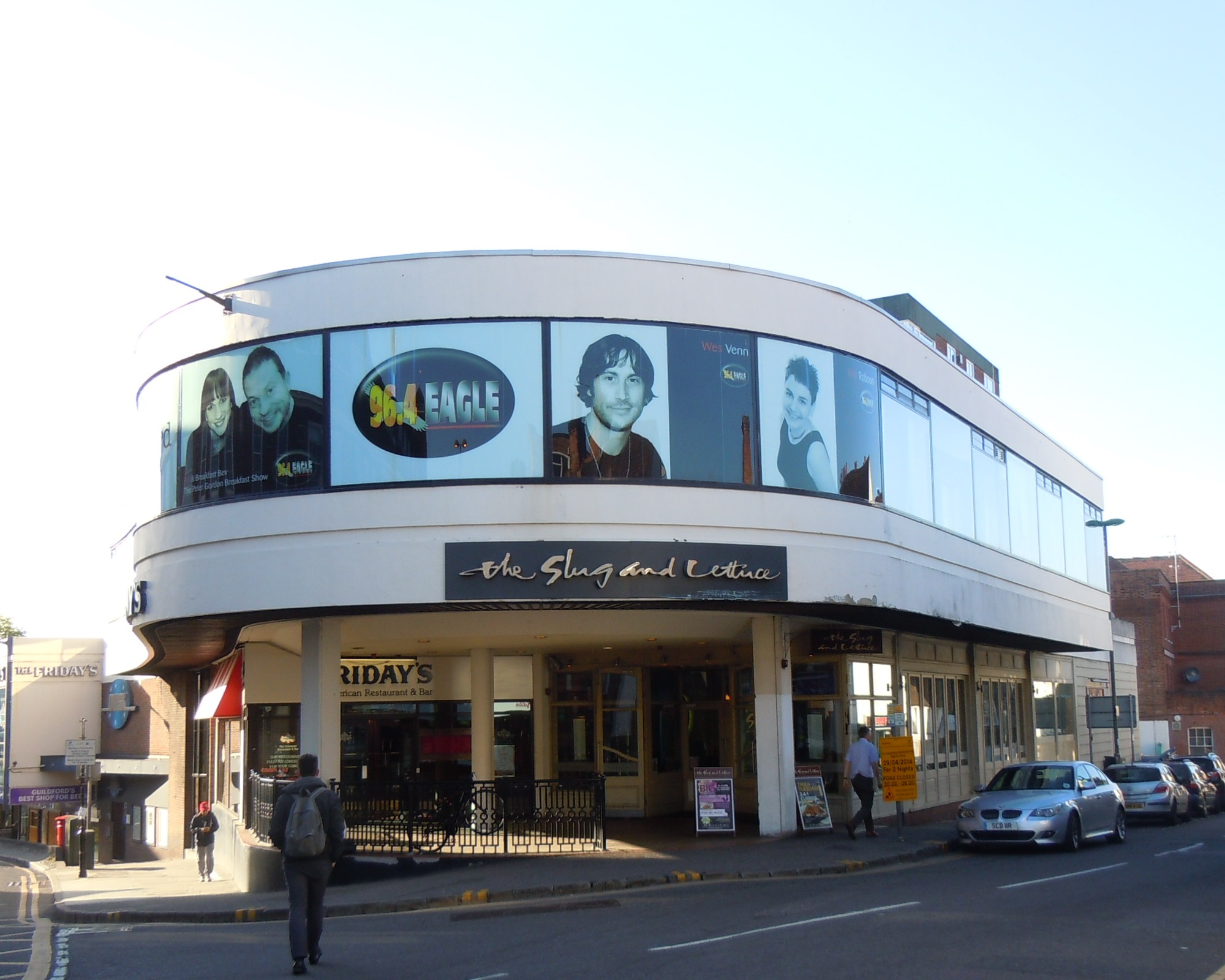
Dolphin House, North Street, Guildford

In 1995, the link between the Guildford and Crawley stations was broken, as Allied lost the Guildford licence. UKRD won the franchise - set to go on air in April 1996 - brought forward by seven months by agreement.

UKRD, led by Mike Powell, wanted to revive the station - and from 1 September 1995 it resumed broadcasting, as a skeleton service, on 96.4FM and 1476 AM to assist in a full launch.

On 29 December 1995, the station moved into Dolphin House, North Street, Guildford – ending twelve years at the Friary – and on 4 January 1996 the new UKRD stations launched, splitting frequencies:

1. 1476 MW became County Sound in its original style
2. 96.4 became Eagle Radio appealing more to a younger audience.

In 1999, County Sound moved to its last frequency of 1566 MW. In its last years, the MW station became increasingly a jukebox with Steve Dean on a Sunday morning, and the main live presenter Dave Johns who both left before Christmas of 2011. Original presenter Simon Cummings died in December 1996 after suffering a long illness.

For 20 months from 2 April 2012, the older-track focus of station continued as "Eagle Extra" which relayed 'The Peter Gordon Breakfast show' from Eagle Radio. In December 2014, its 1566 MW licence/bandwidth was sold to Premier Christian Radio which has become one of several AM relays in south-east England of its London-HQ broadcasts, which are more widely available on DAB.

== Further advertising ==
County Sound Radio also advertised with Matchbox toys, a van in the station's livery being released as part of Matchbox's Super Kings line.
