= Heart South Devon =

England
- Broadcast area: South Hams
- Frequencies: 100.5 MHz; 100.8 MHz; 101.2 MHz; 101.9 MHz

Programming
- Format: Hot AC

History
- First air date: 1 December 1999
- Last air date: 27 August 2010

Heart South Devon (formerly South Hams Radio) was an Independent Local Radio station serving the South Hams area of Devon, England. The station began broadcasting on 1 December 1999 and until its closure, was run as a joint venture between UKRD Group and Global Radio from studios at South Hams Business Park at Churchstow, Kingsbridge.

The station's main frequency was on 101.2 FM, broadcast initially from Bolberry Down near Hope Cove, but later moving to a site near Soar in 2003. The station also broadcast from three relay transmitters at Totnes (100.5FM), Dartmouth (100.8FM) and Ivybridge (101.9FM). In 2017, the main transmitter on 101.2FM was moved from Soar to the Kingsbridge TV relay site near West Alvington.

Some of the Presenters on South Hams Radio included David FitzGerald, Pat Holness, David James, Rob Wheeler, Lisa Hartwell, Dave Gould, Chris Batchelor, Matt Lissack, Carmella Mckenzie, Craig Armet, John Coates, and Graham Russell.

== History ==
On Monday 23 March 2009, South Hams Radio became Heart South Devon, as part of the Heart Network. By this time, most of the station's programming was produced in London, with the only local shows being the breakfast and drivetime shows during the week.

On 21 June 2010, Global Radio announced plans to close Heart South Devon and merge the station with Heart Plymouth, Heart Exeter and Heart Torbay and Heart North Devon as part of plans to reduce the Heart network of stations from 33 to 16. The new station, Heart Devon, began broadcasting from Exeter on Friday 27 August 2010.
