= Eagle Radio =

Former radio station in Surrey, England

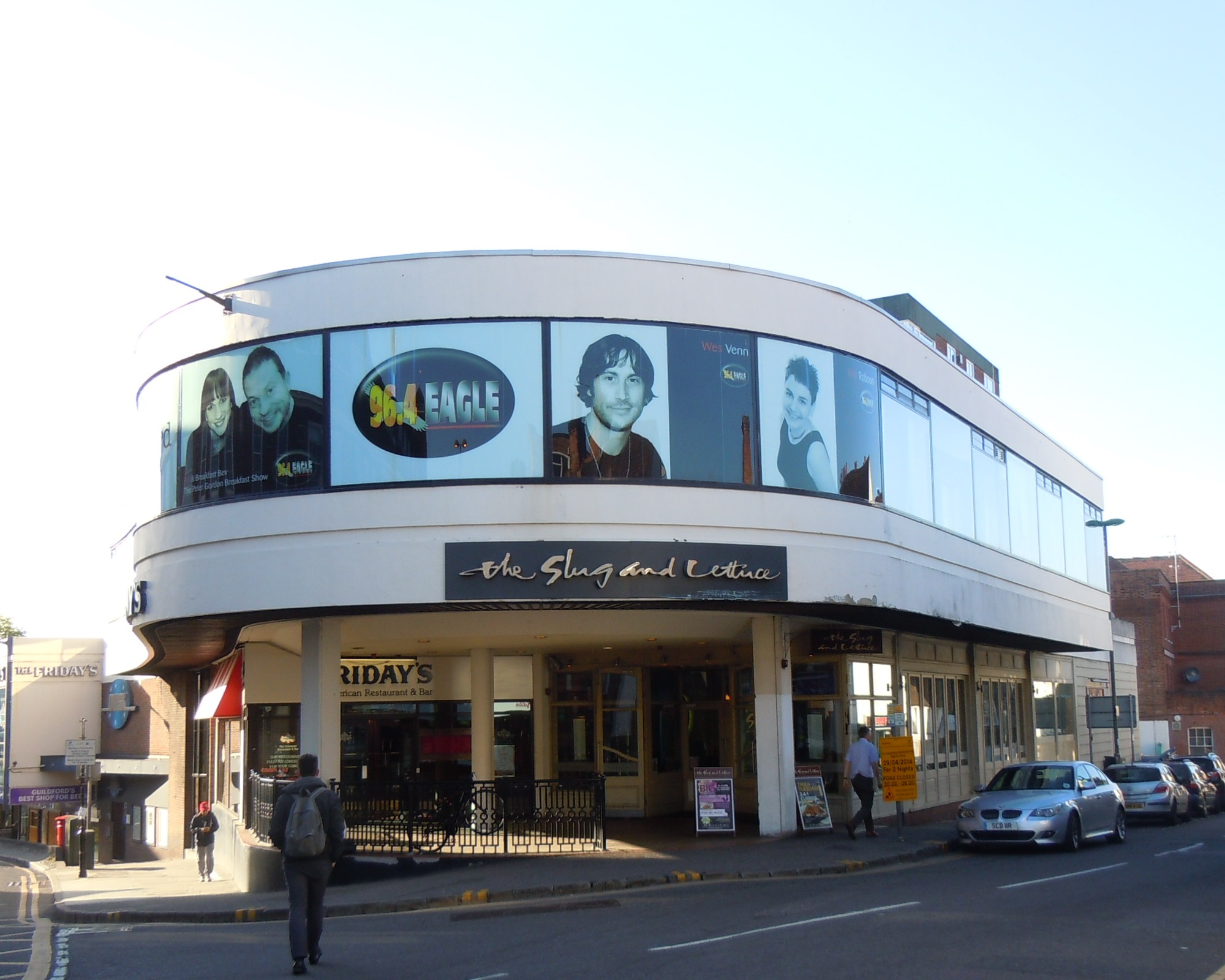
- Dolphin House, Guildford – the radio station's former base – in 2014, showing the logo in use at that time

England
- Broadcast area: Surrey and North-East Hampshire
- Frequencies: FM: 96.4 MHz; DAB

Programming
- Format: Hot AC
- Network: Greatest Hits Radio

Ownership
- Owner: Bauer Radio
- Sister stations: Formerly: eagle80s eagle70s

History
- First air date: 4 January 1996; 30 years ago
- Last air date: 1 September 2020; 5 years ago
- Former names: 96.4 The Eagle; 96.4 Eagle Radio

Technical information
- Transmitter coordinates: 51.2284°N 0.6054°W

Eagle Radio was an Independent Local Radio station in the Surrey and North East Hampshire area of England. Based in Guildford in the Guildford College campus, Eagle Radio was part of the UKRD Group of radio stations.

== Launch ==
Peter Gordon launched 96.4 The Eagle at 7:45a.m. on 4 January 1996, with the words "Hey, I've landed", an allusion to "the Eagle has Landed", spoken by Neil Armstrong after the Apollo 11 mission had reached the surface of the Moon. The first song played was "Uptown Girl" by Billy Joel and the second song was "Dreams" by Fleetwood Mac.

== History ==
The station changed its name from 96.4 The Eagle to 96.4 Eagle Radio in February 2007 and later changed to solely Eagle Radio. It launched on DAB Digital Radio on 12 December 2013.

Until 2018, Eagle Radio broadcast The Vodafone Big Top 40 chart show (previously The Pepsi Chart & Hit40UK) which was produced from Capital FM in London and syndicated across over 140 commercial radio stations in the UK. However, the show was withdrawn from syndication in 2018 and now broadcasts solely on Heart & Capital stations.

Sister stations eagle70s and eagle80s were launched on DAB in 2017 and 2018 respectively.

== Closure ==
Eagle Radio was purchased by Bauer Media in 2019 along with other stations in the UKRD group. On 27 May 2020, it was announced that Eagle Radio would become Greatest Hits Radio from early September 2020. The station went through a transitional period where its playlist was changed over to the 70s, 80s and 90s era, and jingles changed to reflect the station playing "greatest hits". Eagle Radio was finally rebranded to Greatest Hits Radio at 6:00am on 1 September 2020.

== Notable past presenters ==
- Leona Graham (now at Absolute 80s)
