= Timeline of radio in London =

This is a timeline of the development of radio in London.

== 1970s ==
- 1970
  - 6 October – BBC Radio London launches, becoming the first legal radio station broadcasting to London.
- 1971
  - No events.
- 1972
  - No events.
- 1973
  - 8 October – LBC becomes the first legal Independent Local Radio station in the United Kingdom when it begins broadcasting at just before 6 am, providing talk radio to the London area.
  - 16 October – Capital Radio begins broadcasting a music-based general entertainment service to the London area.
- 1974
  - 22 November – The first regular programme for the black community Black Londoners is broadcast on BBC Radio London. The programme was initially launched as a trial run of six programmes before becoming a weekly fixture in the schedules.
- 1975
  - Capital Radio and LBC change MW frequencies. This gives Capital a boost as its MW service had suffered from co-channel interference from Dutch station Radio Veronica.
- 1976
  - 12 September – The first edition of London Sounds Eastern is broadcast on BBC Radio London.
  - December – Capital Radio launches the Flying Eye, a traffic spotting light aircraft which reported on traffic congestion on the streets of Central London.
- 1977
  - No events.
- 1978
  - No events.
- 1979
  - 15 November – BBC Radio 4 begins broadcasting on MW in London. Listeners struggle to get buzz-free and crackle-free reception on long wave due to large steel-framed buildings. This issue does not affect MW broadcasts so the transmitter is brought into service to provide a satisfactory signal for the station's long wave output for listeners in central London.

== 1980s ==
- 1980
  - No events.
- 1981
  - 11 February – BBC Radio London begins broadcasting in stereo and the station relaunches, adopting an easy listening format ranging from softer contemporary pop to light classical music. The launch of stereo broadcasting sees the station simulcast BBC Radio 1 on weeknight evenings between the end of programmes and 10pm, the start time of the MW-only station's weeknight 'borrow' of BBC Radio 2's FM frequencies.
- 1982
  - September – Listeners in London are able to tune into the BBC World Service for the first time following the switching on of the Orfordness transmitting station. It is switched on to provide reception across Northern Europe of the English language service.
- 1983
  - No events.
- 1984
  - BBC Radio London is relaunched with the tagline The Heart and Soul of London, with more soul music being played during the day.
- 1985
  - London Sounds Eastern ends after nine years on air.
  - 4 February – After broadcasting off and on since 1969, Radio Jackie's time as a pirate station ends. It returns 18 years later as a legal station, broadcasting to the same area of south west London that it had served as a pirate.
  - October – The first broadcasts of Kiss as a pirate station take place, initially broadcasting at the weekend across south London but is soon broadcasting across London on 94 FM.
- 1986
  - 4 May – As part of an experiment in split broadcasting, Capital runs a Sunday service called CFM, broadcasting a more contemporary mix of music than normally broadcast by the station.
  - Kiss expands its broadcasting hours when it adds a Friday schedule.
- 1987
  - Capital Radio’s new programming controller Richard Park oversees an overhaul of Capital's output from a full-service station to a music-intensive CHR format, which proves highly successful. The revamp is underlined by a new on-air imaging package, known as 'Music Power'.
  - 31 October – London is the first area of the UK to be able to receive BBC Radio 1 all day on VHF/FM.
- 1988
  - 2 July – At 7am, Tony Blackburn launches Capital Gold on Capital Radio's MW frequency. The station initially broadcasts only at the weekend. Other launch presenters include David Hamilton, Paul Burnett, Pete Tong, Clive Warren, Paul Gambaccini, and Kenny Everett.
  - 7 October – At 7pm, BBC Radio London stops broadcasting after 18 years on air and straight away, test transmissions for its replacement, Greater London Radio (GLR), begin.
  - 25 October – At 6:30am, BBC GLR launches. Put together by new Managing Editor Matthew Bannister and Programme Director Trevor Dann, the station is aimed at 25- to 45-year-olds and is on air daily from 6.30am until 12midnight. Early promotions use the phrase "rock 'n' rolling news" with a music mix that was best described as Adult album alternative and travel news every 20 minutes. A number of specialist speech programmes launch, many of them broadcasting as a MW opt-out. They are aimed at London's communities with weekly programmes for the Asian, Afro-Caribbean, Jewish, Gay and Irish communities.
  - 1 November – Capital Gold begins full-time broadcasting, and Capital's FM service is renamed as 95.8 Capital FM.
  - 31 December – Kiss ends its time as a pirate station, doing so in order to be able to apply to broadcast legally. It fails in its first attempt but is successful second time round.
- 1989
  - 2 October – LBC ends and is replaced on FM by news and comment station LBC Crown FM and on MW by phone-in station London Talkback.
  - 5 November – Sunrise Radio begins broadcasting to west London's Asian community on MW.
  - 13 November – London Greek Radio and WNK begin broadcasting. They share a frequency and alternate every four hours.
  - December – A second batch of London-wide incremental licenses are awarded and this time Kiss is successful.

== 1990s ==
- 1990
  - 4 March – Jazz FM launches on 102.2 FM, playing mainly soul and jazz music.
  - 18 March – Radio Thamesmead begins broadcasting to the Thamesmead area of London.
  - 31 March – Choice FM begins broadcasting to the Brixton area of London.
  - 25 June
    - Airport Information Radio begins broadcasting, providing a travel news service to Heathrow and Gatwick airports.
    - Spectrum Radio begins broadcasting. The station provides airtime to various ethnic communities across London.
  - 9 July – Melody Radio launches as an easy listening music service on 104.9 FM.
  - 1 September – Kiss 100 starts broadcasting as a legal, licensed station.
- 1991
  - During 1991, GLR is given three years to prove itself or face closure. The threat is lifted after the BBC deemed it sufficiently patronised to remain on-air.
  - 18 November – Live presentation on Airport Information Radio ends in favour of a pre-recorded service, after the station was bought by Allied Radio plc.
- 1992
  - 11 February – Airport Information Radio closes after less than two years on air.
- 1993
  - BBC GLR is forced to introduce all-speech programmes at breakfast and drivetime.
  - September – The Radio Authority announces that it will not be renewing LBC's licence. The new licensee is to be London News Radio, a consortium led by former LBC staff and backed by Guinness Mahon.
  - November – BBC GLR stops broadcasting on MW.
  - Unknown – London station WNK closes. WNK's closure allows London Greek Radio, with whom it had shared a frequency, to begin full-time broadcasts.
  - Unknown – Sunrise Radio starts to broadcast across London when it begins transmission on the MW frequency previously occupied by BBC GLR.
- 1994
  - 1 September – Country 1035 begins broadcasting a country music service on MW to London.
  - 5 October – News Direct 97.3FM and London News Talk 1152AM begin broadcasting. They replace LBC Newstalk and London Talkback Radio. The change occurs following last year's decision by the Radio Authority not renew LBC's licence, instead giving it to London News Radio, a consortium led by former LBC staff and backed by Guinness Mahon.
  - 8 October – Virgin Radio is awarded one of the new London-wide FM licences. The other three newly licensed stations are Heart 106.2, Premier Christian Radio and Viva 963.
- 1995
  - 10 April – Virgin Radio starts broadcasting on FM in London. The station is a full simulcast of the national service apart from a 45 minute weekday early evening programme, presented initially by Rowland Rivron.
  - Spring – The rolling news format on London News Direct 97.3 gives way to a more traditional schedule of news sequences and magazine programmes and the station name is shortened to News 97.3 in the summer.
  - 10 June – Premier Christian Radio becomes the UK’s first Christian radio station when it launches on AM.
  - 3 July – Viva 963 becomes the UK’s first female-orientated radio station when it starts broadcasting on AM.
  - 17 August – London Turkish Radio begins broadcasting.
  - 5 September – Heart 106.2 launches, broadcasting a 'Hot AC' music format.
  - 27 September – The BBC begins regular Digital Audio Broadcasting, from the Crystal Palace transmitting station.
- 1996
  - May – Viva 963 is sold to Mohammed Al Fayed, owner of Harrods and chairman of Fulham Football Club, who renames the station as Liberty Radio.
  - London News Radio buys London Radio Services which operates the two London news licenses – London News 97.3FM and London News Talk 1152AM and News 97.3 reverts to a rolling news format, initially with no name (the station was branded as 97.3FM).
  - 1 July – The LBC name returns to London's airwaves following a rebrand of London News Radio's MW station News Talk 1152.
  - July – The Radio Authority receives 25 bids for the final FM citywide London licence. XFM is chosen as the winner.
  - October – Capital’s flagship news programme The Way It Is ends.
  - 14 November – LBC relaunches its rolling news service as News Direct 97.3.
  - Melody Radio changes frequencies, moving from 104.9 to 105.4.
- 1997
  - 1 September – XFM London begins broadcasting an indie music service across London. It becomes the final London-wide station on FM.
  - Capital leaves its Euston Tower studios and moves to new headquarters in Leicester Square.
  - Radio Thamesmead, (broadcasting as RTM), changes its name to Millennium 106.8.
- 1998
  - 18 May – Active FM begins broadcasting to the Havering area of east London.
  - December – Melody Radio is renamed Magic 105.4 FM.
- 1999
  - January – Controversial changes are made to Kiss 100 following Emap's decision to align the station with the rest of its operations. The on-air changes lead to criticisms from presenters and listeners who feel that the station is losing its musical direction.
  - 8 February – FLR 107.3 begins broadcasting to the Lewisham area of south London.
  - 2 September – London’s first DAB multiplex, CE Digital, launches.

== 2000s ==
- 2000
  - 25 March – BBC Radio London replaces GLR. Promising even more speech and less music, the station launches with new on-air personalities and new shows, including a speech-heavy breakfast show and a mid-morning phone-in and debate. Only drivetime and the specialist shows would remain, albeit refreshed.
  - 3 May – Choice 107.1 begins broadcasting to north London.
  - 26 June – London’s second DAB multiplex, Switch London, launches.
  - July – BBC London Live 94.9 starts broadcasting via DAB.
  - News Direct 97.3 is renamed with the ITN brand and is now called ITN News Direct 97.3FM.
  - 4 December – FLR 107.3 changes its name to Fusion 107.3FM.
- 2001
  - 1 March – 107.8 Radio Jackie begins broadcasting to the Kingston-upon-Thames area.
  - 1 October – BBC London Live changes its name to BBC London 94.9.
- 2002
  - 25 February – London’s third DAB multiplex, DRG London, launches.
  - 12 November – The Radio Authority announces that London station Liberty Radio has lost its licence to Club Asia, which had previously been broadcasting for several hours each day on Spectrum Radio. This had been the first time in several years that the incumbent broadcaster's licence had not been renewed. The station had repeatedly only obtained a 0.1% share of listening.
  - Late 2002 – London Radio Services is sold to Chrysalis Radio. The new owner drops the ITN prefix and the station returns to its previous name of News Direct 97.3.
- 2003
  - 6 January – The LBC services swap wavebands. The rolling news service News Direct 97.3 moves to AM and is renamed LBC News 1152 and LBC transfers to FM and is renamed LBC 97.3. The change takes place following the purchase of the two stations by Chrysalis Radio.
  - January – Millennium 106.8 is rebranded as Time 106.8.
  - A number of specialist shows are axed from BBC London Live.
  - 3 July – Having lost its licence, Liberty Radio closes down after eight years on air. It is immediately replaced by Club Asia.
  - September – Live evening programmes on Magic 105.4 are replaced by automated output.
  - 19 October – More than three decades after it first began broadcasting as a pirate station, and 18 years since its last broadcast, Radio Jackie goes on air as a legal station. It broadcasts to south west London, replacing Thames Radio which had fallen into financial difficulty.
- 2004
  - February – Fusion 107.3 changes its name to Time 107.3FM.
- 2005
  - 27 May – After more than 15 years on air, 102.2 Jazz FM closes.
  - 7 June – 102.2 Smooth FM launches as the replacement service for 102.2 Jazz FM.
- 2006
  - 9 January – Capital is relaunched under its original name Capital Radio, with a modified line-up of presenters and a slightly tweaked music format.
  - 6 September – Due to falling listener figures, Kiss 100 is relaunched with a renewed focus on dance music.
- 2007
  - March – Capital Radio is rebranded once again as Capital 95.8 – together with a new slogan, The Sound of London.
  - 16 April – Life FM begins broadcasting to the Harlesden area of London.
  - 20 May – Time 107.3 is relaunched as South London Radio. The change sees alterations to the station's coverage area. It no longer serves Southwark, and instead, thanks to approved transmitter adjustments, moving westwards to focus on the boroughs of Lewisham, Bromley, and Croydon.
  - 3 August – Capital Gold is replaced by a new network called simply Gold following the merger of the Classic Gold and Capital Gold networks under one owner, GCap Media.
- 2008
  - Summer – LBC News 1152 is substantially cut back. The automated overnight service is abandoned in favour of a simulcast of LBC 97.3 and even daytime is semi-automated.
- 2009
  - 3 April – London stations Time 107.3 and Time 106.8 close. The latter station had originally launched as Radio Thamesmead in 1990.
  - August – Club Asia goes into administration and is taken over by the Litt Corporation, owners of rival station Sunrise Radio. The station is relaunched as Buzz Asia.

== 2010s ==
- 2010
  - No events.
- 2011
  - 3 January – Capital FM launches nationally and becomes a part of The Capital FM Network as part of a merger of Global Radio's Hit Music and Galaxy networks to form the nine-station 'Capital Network'. Other than daily breakfast and weekday drivetime shows, the majority of Capital's London-based output is now networked.
  - 27 March – Due to budget cuts, transmission of the BBC World Service on 648 kHz MW ends. The transmissions, from the Orfordness transmitting station in Suffolk, had been on air since 1982 and had provided English-language coverage of the World Service to much of northern Europe resulting in the World Service being available on MW across London.
- 2012
  - 3 January – Live presentation returns to LBC News 1152.
- 2013
  - 7 January – BBC Radio London no longer broadcasts its own evening programming, instead it broadcasts the BBC's networked evening programme.
  - 7 October – Choice FM is rebranded as Capital Xtra.
- 2014
  - 11 February – LBC 97.3 launches nationally on the Digital One platform.
  - Unknown – Launch of London One Radio, an online station for London's Italian community, and the UK's first Italian radio station.
- 2015
  - January – LBC London News is relaunched as LBC London News. It broadcasts a 20-minute wheel of news and airs during the day with evening and overnight programming being a simulcast of LBC 97.3.
  - 5 January – Magic 105.4 becomes a national DAB station but continues to air on its FM frequency in London.
  - 21 September – Xfm is relaunched as Radio X and begins broadcasting nationally via DAB but continues to be available across London on FM.
  - 6 October – After 27 years, the name BBC Radio London returns to the airwaves.
  - 29 October – As part of a trial of small-scale digital multiplexes, a small-scale multiplex in London, operated by U.DAB, goes on air. Initially a nine-month trial, the multiplexes are now licensed until March 2020.
- 2016
  - No events.
- 2017
  - No events.
- 2018
  - 19 March – Love Sport Radio launches on MW across London. It uses the frequency previously occupied by Spectrum Radio.
  - 26 November – Following the decision to reinstate local programmes on BBC Local Radio on weeknights, BBC Radio London launches The Scene, which is described as "a platform for London’s community arts, entertainment and cultural activities, featuring new talent and emerging artists, performers and creators."
- 2019
  - 8 April – Capital London's breakfast show goes national, replacing most of the network's local breakfast shows, except for Capital Cymru, which also retains local programming at weekends. All Capital stations continue to air weekday Drivetime shows, local news bulletins and traffic updates.
  - 1 August – Love Sport Radio and Panjab Radio swap MW frequencies.

== 2020s ==
- 2020
  - 31 December – Love Sport Radio closes.
- 2021
  - 17 May – Greatest Hits Radio launches on FM in London. It is able to do so by broadcasting on the frequency that carried Absolute Radio. Bauer is able to make the change following permission from Ofcom to swap Absolute Radio with Greatest Hits Radio. Absolute Radio, and its predecessor Virgin Radio, had broadcast on FM in London since 1995, and the station continues to be available in the capital on MW and DAB.
- 2022
  - No events.
- 2023
  - No events.
- 2024
  - 12 September – Global launches 12 new radio stations, all sister stations to its existing networks, and they all appear on DAB in London.
  - 22 September – After 34 years, Kiss 100 stops broadcasting on FM due to it being replaced by Hits Radio.
  - 30 October – Global removes LBC News from its 1152 kHz medium wave frequency, but the station continues on DAB and online.

== See also ==
- Timeline of radio in Manchester
- Timeline of radio in Northern Ireland
- Timeline of radio in Scotland
- Timeline of radio in Wales
