= Time FM =

Time FM could mean any of the following radio stations operated by the Sunrise Radio Group:

- Time 106.6
- Time 106.8
- Time 107.3
- Time 107.5
