= Easy Radio London =

England
- Broadcast area: London
- Frequencies: DAB: 11B DRg London

Programming
- Format: Pop, easy listening and country

Ownership
- Owner: Sunrise Radio Group

History
- First air date: 1 September 1994 as Country 1035
- Last air date: 28 October 2008

Easy Radio London was a British radio station broadcasting to London on DAB.

== History ==
The station began life in September 1994 as Country 1035, a country station broadcasting to London on medium wave. Over the next few years, successive takeovers and relaunches saw the station broadcast under the names RTL Country 1035, Ritz Radio 1035 and Mean Country 1035.

In 2003, the Sunrise Radio Group acquired Mean Country 1035 and renamed the station Easy Radio. Sunrise agreed a slight change of format with the Radio Authority permitting it to reduce the proportion of pure country tracks and play more mainstream pop and rock songs that were either influenced by country music or musically compatible with it.

The station's presenters during this period included Ron Brown on the breakfast show and Jack Kelly on the mid-morning programme. The programme controller was Simon Yates.

In July 2004, Sunrise applied to Ofcom to change the station's format to an Asian speech station, Kismat Radio. In its submission, Sunrise claimed the country format had never been profitable, losing between £6m and £7m since launch, and had proven "disastrous financially". It also cited poor sound quality on medium wave.

In addition, Sunrise pledged to maintain the Easy Radio service on DAB if its application to change the medium wave format was granted. The station had originally launched on the DRg multiplex for London in January 2002, during the Ritz Radio era.

Ofcom granted Sunrise permission to change format in November 2004, and Kismat Radio took over the 1035 kHz frequency, with Easy Radio moving to DAB only, now playing a broader mix of music with some country crossover.

In 2007 and 2008, Easy Radio formed part of successful applications by the DAB operator MuxCo for digital multiplexes in Gloucestershire, Herefordshire and Worcestershire, Lincolnshire, North East Wales and West Cheshire, North Yorkshire, Somerset, and Surrey and Sussex.

In June 2008, live presentation by DJs ended, with the station now playing non-stop music, interspersed with jingles and hourly news bulletins from IRN.

The station played a mix of pop, rock and easy listening, as well as a proportion of country tracks by mainstream artists such as Shania Twain, Dixie Chicks, Kenny Rogers and Dolly Parton. It had 19,000 listeners a week, according to listening figures published by RAJAR for the period ending June 2008.

The station closed on 28 October 2008 and was replaced on the DRg multiplex by Kismat Radio.

== Former presenters ==
- Mark Anthony
- Ron Brown (later worked for Time 106.6 on the Breakfast show).
- Keith Butler
- Chris England
- Mark Yates
- Lee Canderton
- Philip Chryssikos
- Gavin Harris
- Sid Griffin
- Kerry McCarthy
- Paul Owens
- Bobby Gee
- Dave Silver
- Stephen Ham
- Gill Rickson
