= Telecommunications in Sierra Leone =

Telecommunications in Sierra Leone include radio, television, fixed and mobile telephones, and the Internet. Radio remains the most widely accessed and trusted media source in the country, with high listenership particularly in urban and peri‑urban areas. Sierra Leone’s broadcast landscape includes a mix of government‑owned and private radio and television stations, with community and commercial outlets serving both urban and rural populations.

Telephone services have grown significantly since the early 2010s, driven primarily by mobile cellular networks. As of late 2025, there were approximately 8.94 million active cellular mobile connections in Sierra Leone, equivalent to about 101 % of the population, reflecting widespread access to mobile communication.

Internet access has expanded in recent years alongside mobile network growth. By the end of 2025, an estimated 1.85 million individuals in Sierra Leone were using the internet, corresponding to roughly 20.8 % of the population. Mobile broadband (including 3G and 4G services) now covers a large portion of the population, although actual usage varies by region and device access.

== Radio and television ==
- Radios: 1.12 million radios (1997).
- Television sets: 53,000 (1997).
- Television stations: One government-owned TV station; one private TV station began operating in 2005; pay-TV services are available (2007).
- Radio stations: One government-owned national radio station; about two dozen private radio stations primarily clustered in major cities; transmissions of several international broadcasters are available (2007).
  - Sierra Leone Broadcasting Service (SLBS), government broadcaster on 100.0 MHz (Freetown), Bo 96.5 MHz, Kenema 93.5 MHz, Makeni 88.0 MHz, Koidu 89.2 MHz and Kailahun.
  - BBC World Service, 94.3 MHz (Freetown), 94.5 MHz Bo and 95.3 MHz Kenema.
  - Believers Broadcasting Network (BBN), 93.0 MHz.
  - Capital Radio 104.9 MHz in Freetown and 102.3 MHz in Bo.
  - Citizen, 103.7 MHz.
  - Radio Democracy, 98.1 MHz.
  - Kalleon, 105.7 MHz.
  - Radio France Internationale (RFI), 89.9 MHz.
  - Sky, 106.6 MHz.
  - United Nations Radio, 103.0 MHz.
  - Voice of America (VoA), 102.4 MHz.
  - Voice of the Handicapped (VoH), 96.2 MHz.

Radio is the most-popular and most-trusted media in Sierra Leone, with 85% of people having access to a radio and 72% of people in the country listening to the radio daily. These levels vary between areas of the country, with the Western Area having the highest levels and Kailahun the lowest. Stations mainly consist of local commercial stations with a limited broadcast range, combined with a few stations with national coverage – Capital Radio Sierra Leone being the largest of the commercial stations.

Outside the capital Freetown and other major cities, television is not watched by a great many people, although Bo, Kenema, and Makeni are served by their own relays of the main SLBC service. There are two national, free terrestrial television stations in Sierra Leone, one run by the government SLBC and the other a private station, AIT (Africa Independent Television) which is linked with the Nigerian station of the same name.

In 2007, a new pay-per-view TV service was introduced by GTV as part of a pan-African television service in addition to the then nine-year-old sub-Saharan Digital Satellite Television service (DStv) from the South African company Multichoice. GTV subsequently went out of business, leaving DStv as the only provider of pay-per-view television in the country.

The Sierra Leone Broadcasting Service (SLBS) was created by the colonial government in 1934 making it the earliest English language radio broadcaster service in West Africa. The service began broadcasting television in 1963, with coverage extended to all the districts in the country in 1978.

The United Nations Mission in Sierra Leone (UNIOSIL) ran one of the most popular stations in the country, broadcasting programs in a range of languages. The UN mission was restructured in 2008 and it was decided that UN Radio would merge with SLBS to form the new Sierra Leone Broadcasting Corporation (SLBC). This merger took place in April 2010 after the necessary legislation was enacted. SLBC transmits radio on FM and has two television services, one of which is uplinked by satellite for international consumption. The SLBC is operated by an Independent Media Commission (IMC), under the supervision of the Sierra Leone Ministry of Information and Communications.

FM relays of the BBC World Service, Radio France Internationale and Voice of America are also broadcast.

The All People’s Congress (APC) and opposition Sierra Leone People’s Party (SLPP) radio stations that were shut down in the wake of the 2009 riots remain closed.

Challenges facing broadcasters include unreliable power supplies, poor funding and low advertising revenues. Media rights monitors say high-level corruption is a taboo topic, with officials using libel laws to target errant journalists.

== Telephones ==
- Calling code: +232
- International call prefix: 00
- Main lines:
  - 18,000 lines in use (2012);
  - 14,000 lines in use (2009)
- Mobile cellular:
  - 2.2 million lines (2012);
  - 2 million lines (2009)
- Telephone system: marginal telephone service with poor infrastructure; the national microwave radio relay trunk system connects Freetown to Bo and Kenema; while mobile-cellular service is growing rapidly from a small base, service area coverage remains limited (2009).
- Satellite earth stations: 1 Intelsat (Atlantic Ocean) (2009).
- Communications cables: the Africa Coast to Europe (ACE) Submarine communications cable that runs along the west coast of Africa and on to Portugal and France has a landing point in Freetown.

== Internet ==
- Top-level domain: .sl
- Internet users:
  - 71,318 users, 176th in the world; 1.3% of the population, 207th in the world (2012);
  - 14,900 (2009).
- Internet hosts: 282 hosts (2012).
- IPv4: 44,032 addresses allocated, less than 0.05% of the world total, 78.6 addresses per 1000 people (2012).
- Internet service providers (ISPs) (2014):
  - Cajutel
  - Afcom
  - Iptel
  - Limeline
  - Onlime
  - Sierra WiFi
  - Alemobet Innovations
- VSAT Satellite Service Providers (2014):
  - GlobalTT
  - Limeline
  - Onlime
  - Vizocom

Internet access in Sierra Leone has been sparse, but is on the increase, especially since the introduction of 3G cellular phone services across the country and the arrival of the ACE cable in Freetown in the second half of 2011. Freetown has Internet cafes and other businesses offering Internet access. Problems experienced with access to the Internet include an intermittent electricity supply and a slow connection speed in the country outside Freetown. Outside of Freetown enterprises generally have to rely on VSAT satellite services.

=== Internet censorship and surveillance ===
There are no government restrictions on access to the Internet or credible reports that the government monitors e-mail or Internet chat rooms. Individuals and groups engage in the expression of views via the Internet, including by e-mail.

The constitution and law provide for freedom of speech and press, and the government generally respects these rights. An independent press, a generally effective judiciary, and a functioning democratic political system combine to ensure freedom of speech and press. The law criminalizes defamatory and seditious libel, but is rarely applied. Its threatened application may stifle expression and journalists do engage in self-censorship. The constitution and laws prohibit arbitrary interference with privacy, family, home, or correspondence, and the government generally respects these prohibitions.

== See also ==
- Media in Sierra Leone
