= Mass media in Sierra Leone =

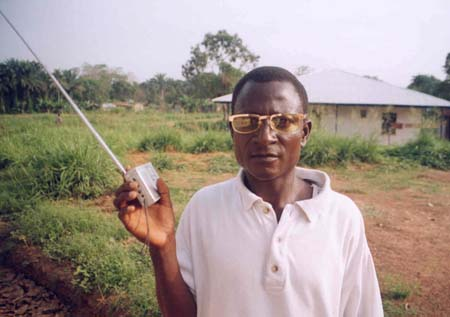
Radio listener in rural Kailahun

Mass media in Sierra Leone began when the first modern printing press in Africa arrived at the start of the 19th century. In the 1860s the country became a journalist hub for Africa with professional travelling to the country from across the continent. At the end of the 19th century the industry went into decline and when radio was introduced in the 1930s this became the primary communication media. Print media is not widely read in Sierra Leone, especially outside Freetown, partially due to the low levels of literacy in the country. In 2008 there were 15 daily newspapers in addition to those published weekly. Among newspaper readership young people are likely to read newspapers weekly and older people daily. The majority of newspapers are privately run and are often critical of the government.

The Sierra Leone Broadcasting Services (SLBS) was created by the government in 1934 making it the earliest English language radio broadcast service in West Africa. Radio is the most popular and most trusted media in Sierra Leone, with 85% of people having access to a radio and 72% of people in the country listening to the radio daily. Stations are mainly local commercial stations with a limited broadcast range with only a few stations having national coverage. There is one national free terrestrial television station but outside the capital Freetown and a few other major cities television is not watched by many people. Internet access in Sierra Leone has been low but is on the increase, especially since the introduction of wireless services across the country.

The constitution of Sierra Leone guarantees freedom of speech, and freedom of the press; however, the government maintains strong control of the media and at times restricts these rights in practice. Some subjects are seen as taboo by society and members of the political elite, imprisonment and violence has been used by the political establishment against journalists. In 2006 President Ahmad Tejan Kabbah committed to reforming the laws governing the press and media to create a freer system for journalist to work in but in 2007 Sierra Leone was ranked as having the 121st least free press in the world. Sierra Leone has been featured in foreign media with coverage mainly focused on the country's civil war. Foreign media, particularly American gangsta rap had an influence on the combatants in the civil war particularly the West Side Boys.

== History ==
The first modern printing press in Africa arrived in Freetown in 1794 but was destroyed by a French raiding party before it could be used. When another press became operational in 1800 it allowed the newspapers the Sierra Leone Advertiser and the Royal Gazette to begin publication. The Royal Gazette and Sierra Leone Advertiser was published from 1817 to 1827. In the 1860s Sierra Leone developed into a hub of African journalism with professional from all over Africa employed by the country’s newspapers.

The media boom also had an international dimension with newspaper professionals from around the world settling in the country. For example, the New Era paper was set up by West Indian William Drake. The year 1855 saw the foundation of the African Interpreter and Advocate by F. A. Belgrave founded and of the Sierra Leone weekly by Charles Bannerman. In the period newspapers were politically outspoken covering topics including stories about racism, colonialism and the rights of Africans. The industry went into decline at the end of the 19th century due to low levels of sales, which were the main source of income for newspapers.

In 1934 the Sierra Leone Broadcasting Service (SLBS) was formed from the Freetown Rediffusion Service making it the earliest English language radio broadcast service in West Africa. Television broadcasts started in 1963 as a cooperation between the SLBS and commercial interests. Coverage was extended to all districts in 1978 when the service was also upgraded to colour.

Isaac Theophilus Akuna Wallace Johnson started the African Standard in 1939 the newspaper of Sierra Leone's branch of the West African Youth League. In the same year the Daily Mail began and was to become one of the longest running papers in the country and its leading paper closing from 1970 and early 1980s. It closed in the late 1990s but was revived on line in 2010 by three journalists, Leeroy Wilfred Kabs-Kanu, Ahmed Kamara and David Tam-Baryoh.

At the end of the 20th century the newspaper industry experienced a decline with more than 40 newspapers ceasing publication between 1991 and 2007. This was also the time when newspapers developed in terms of business management, and when computers and mobile phones started to be used by journalist.

== Print ==
=== Newspapers ===
Most popular newspapers in 2007
Rank	Title
1	Awoko Times
2	Concord Times
3	For di People
4	Standard
5	Democrat
6	Independent Observer
Data from BBC Trust and Search for Common Ground:

After the end of the Civil War newspapers are not a widely used medium, especially outside Freetown, with only 15 daily newspapers operating in Sierra Leone. As the country recovered the number of newspapers increased and there were 58 newspapers registered in 2010.

Most newspapers are privately run and often critical of the government. The number of people reading newspaper is affected by low levels of literacy in the country. This is a particularly important factor for some sections of society, as only about half of women and older people are literate and literacy levels are lower outside Freetown. Among newspaper readership older people are more likely to read a paper daily and younger people to read weekly. People also trust the information published in newspapers less than that found on the radio.

The standard of print journalism is generally low, with some journalists lacking the training and skills they need to write, edit and disseminate information effectively in print.

=== Books ===
Although Sierra Leone had a long history of publishing and consuming books, the civil war altered this position. In 1982 there were three publishers in Sierra Leone, but 2002 there were no book publishers in Sierra Leone and only one bookshop, a church bookshop for in Christian literary material. Books written by authors from Sierra Leone were still published but publishers from abroad, for example, Unanswered Cries by Osman Conteh won the 2002 Macmillan Writer's Prize for African Children's Literature award.

The Sierra Leone diaspora has written a high proportion of the books published from Sierra Leone authors, including A Long Way Gone: Memoirs of a Boy Soldier, written by Ishmael Beah. The book recalls the experiences of Ishmael during the war in Sierra Leone and his following rehabilitation. There are organisations, such as Sierra Leone PEN, who are trying to revitalise the sector.

== Broadcast ==
=== Radio ===
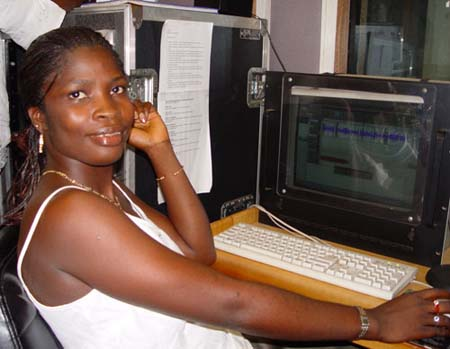
Isata Mahoi radio editor and actress in Atunda Ayenda

Radio is the most common and trusted media in Sierra Leone with 85% of population having access to the radio and 72% listening daily in 2007. The level of penetration of radio varies between districts, from 96% in the urban part of the Western Area, to 65% in Kailahun, and is higher in the main towns than in rural areas. Peak times for listening to the radio are between 6 am and 10 am and between 6 pm and 10 pm. Results of a 2007 British Broadcasting Corporation (BBC) survey indicated it was important to listeners that radio news was unbiased, accurate and trustworthy and that it was by far the most trusted media in Sierra Leone. The results showed that news and music programmes were the most popular and that the radio source of information most people used to learn about events that happened in the country including national elections.

One of the most popular programmes is the soap opera Atunda Ayenda which is broadcast five days a week on 18 local stations. It is produced by Talking Drum Studios a company that was set up by Search for Common Ground, an international non-profit organization, to produce programmes aimed at using the media to address the problems in Sierra Leone left by the civil war by promoting peace and reconciliation. Another popular radio program is Golden Kids News a program produced by young journalists that allows children to discuss topics of interest to them.

==== Stations ====
Most popular radio stations in 2007
Area	Radio station
Bo	Kiss FM
Bombali	Radio Mankneh
Kailahun	Radio Moa
Kono	BBC
Prujehun	Kiss FM
Western Area	UN radio
Data from BBC Trust and Search for Common Ground:

All major cities in the country have their own radio stations and there are many local community radio stations but only a few national stations operating. The Sierra Leone Broadcasting Services (SLBC) which operates under the government Ministry of Information and Broadcasting run stations broadcasting on FM. The SLBC has a studio and transmitter in Freetown and regional headquarters in Bo, Makeni, Kenema, Kailahun, Magburaka and Koidu.

The UN Mission in Sierra Leone (UNIOSIL) used to run the station UN Radio on FM frequency 103.0, this broadcast in languages including English, Krio, Temne, Limba and Mende. Content included news of UN activities and human rights information, as well as music and news. The station closed in 2011.

There are also FM relays of BBC World Service, in Freetown on frequency 94.5, Bo 94.5, Kenema 95.3 and Makeni, Radio France Internationale and Voice of America are available in Freetown.

==== List of radio stations ====
- SLBC - State radio(/TV) station, based in Freetown
- Capital Radio 104.9, 102.3, 103.3 - private station in Freetown, Bo, Kenema and Makeni
- Believer's Broadcasting Network (BBN) FM 93.0 - private station in Freetown
- Fountain Of Peace Radio (FOP) FM 89.6-Private radio in Moyamba
- Sky FM 106.6 - private station in Freetown
- Radio Democracy 98.1 - private station in Freetown
- Voice of the Handicapped - private-run radio station for disabled but attracts audience nationwide
- Children's Radio 103.0 in Freetown
- Radio Tombo 96.0 - private station in Freetown
- Radio Citizen 103.7 private station in Freetown
- Radio Freetown 90.6 private station in Freetown
- Kiss FM 104 - private station in Bo
- Radio New Song 97.5 - private station in Bo
- Eastern Radio 101.9 - private station in Kenema
- Radio Mankneh 95.1 - private station in Makeni
- Radio Gbaft 91.0 - private station in Kenema
- Koidu Radio Station private station in Koidu
- Bintumani 93.5 - private station in Kabala
- Radio Modcar 93.4 - private station in Moyamba
- Radio Moa 101.5 - private station in Kailahun
- Destiny Radio 94.1-private Christian station in Freetown
- Radio Kolenten 92.4 - private station in Kambia
- Radio Bontico 96.4 - private station in Bonthe
- Radio Universal 98.7 - private station in Freetown
- Cat Radio Barming 106.8 - community radio station in Madina Junction, Tonko Limba.
- Radio Maria Sierra Leone Freetown 90.9. Makeni 101.1. Bo 90.9. Kenema 90.7 Private station
- Radio Mount Aureol 107.3- private station in Freetown
- West Africa women and girls empowerment-S/L - private station in Freetown

International Radio

- BBC World Service FM relays in Freetown on 94.5 MHz, Bo on 94.5 MHz, Kenema on 95.3 MHz and Makeni
- RFI (Radio France International) FM relay in Freetown on 89.9 MHz

=== Television ===
There is one operational national television station broadcasting in Sierra Leone which covers the Western Area, Bo, Kenema and Makeni. Outside of these areas TV is not watched by a great many people because of the lack of electricity supply. The operational national terrestrial station is the state run the Sierra Leone Broadcasting Corporation (SLBC) with coverage of Freetown (2 channels), Bo, Kenema and Makeni. Star TV provides a commercial television service for Freetown.

Private station ABC Television-Africa ceased operations several years ago. AIT of Nigeria launched a TV and radio service in 2012, but this was suspended early in 2013 after it attracted only 2 advertisers.

Commercial television in Sierra Leone has not been a viable business because of the relatively low population, low disposable income, poor access to electricity (though this is improving) and lack of large businesses with the budget for television advertising. State broadcaster SLBC does receive some income from commercial operations.

== Internet ==
Internet access in Sierra Leone has been low but from 2008, after the introduction of wireless service and 3G mobile phones, use has increased dramatically. There are several Internet service providers (ISPs) in Sierra Leone. Freetown has a citywide wireless Internet connection and Internet access is offered in cafeterias, hairdressers and dedicated Internet cafes. However, problems, such as intermittent electricity supply, have affected general adoption of the internet.

As of the end of 2013 there are approximately 2,000 business and high-end residential users of fixed Internet services in Sierra Leone and somewhere in the region of 10,000 users with Internet dongles provided by the mobile operators. 3G Mobile Internet services are available throughout the country, though quality can be poor in the east. Businesses operating outside of Freetown generally have to rely on VSAT satellite services.

=== List of ISPs ===
- Afcom
- Africell (2G/3G)
- Orange (2G/3G)
- Atlas
- CeeDee
- Iptel
- Onlime
- Sierratel
- Smart

=== List of VSAT Providers ===
- Onlime

== Censorship and control ==
Press Freedom ranking
Year	Country rank	score
2013	61	26.35
2011-12	63	21.00
2010	91	24.25
2009	115	34.00
2008	114	27.75
2007	121	39.50
2007	121	39.50
2006	103	26.00
2005	126	39.50
2004	88	24.50
2003	87	23.50
2002	72	24.50
Data and ranking from the Press Freedom Index by Reporters Without Borders, a lower score indicates more freedom.

Traditionally, media in Sierra Leone has enjoyed considerable freedom, with very little government interference. The government does effectively control the only free terrestrial television network since they provide the funding. In the distant past, society and members of the political elite imposed a strong control on what was produced with some subjects seen as taboo and violence was used by the political establishment against journalists. For example, Harry Yansaneh, the acting editor of For di People, died in 2005 of kidney failure from the injuries caused by an attack by people allegedly sent by a deputy in the ruling party.

International organisations also have media outlets in Sierra Leone. For example, the BBC World Service is one of the most popular radio stations. However, most of the radio stations in the country are independent commercially owned stations and which is also the case for the newspaper industry. In 2013 Sierra Leone was ranked 61st out of 179 countries on the Press Freedom Index by Reporters Without Borders.

The Sierra Leone constitution guarantees freedom of speech, and freedom of the press; however, the government at times restricts these rights in practice. Under legislation enacted in 1980, all newspapers must register with the Independent Media Commission and pay sizeable registration fees and the Criminal Libel Law including Seditious Libel Law of 1965 is sometime threatened to be used against media houses that incur the displeasure of the government. In the past, this has led to journalists being imprisoned, for example, Paul Kamara, editor of For di People, was imprisoned for 14 months during 2004 and 2005 for seditious libel. Journalist Mohamed Bangura and others were abducted, held, imprisoned and eventually released in 1996. The Sierra Leone Independent Media Commission was created in 2000 as an independent body to regulate the mass media.

In 2006 former President Ahmad Tejan Kabbah committed to reforming the laws governing the press and media to create a freer system for journalist to work in.

== Foreign media ==
Twenty-first century coverage of Sierra Leone in foreign media has focused on events connected with the country's civil war, diamond trade and more recently the Ebola outbreak. Sierra Leone was the setting of the 2006 Edward Zwick film Blood Diamond, set in 1999 during the period of civil war. In the film, Solomon Vandy's son, Dia, is forcibly conscripted into the Revolutionary United Front (RUF). Sierra Leone was the subject of Kanye West's hit single "Diamonds from Sierra Leone" and the video feature the plight of children used to mine conflict diamonds. The work of radio journalist was featured in the 2010 documentary Leh Wi Tok. Continued reference to the counties past problems does cause some exasperation within Sierra Leone.

The content of foreign media influenced rebel groups in the country, for example the West Side Boys, especially American rap and gangsta rap music and the media portrayal of the culture surrounding it.

== See also ==
- Communications in Sierra Leone
- Internet censorship and surveillance in Sierra Leone

what is Mass media

== Bibliography ==
- Richard M'bayo; et al. (1995). "Press Freedom and the Imperatives of Democracy: Towards Sustainable Development". Africa Media Review. 9 (3). Archived from the original on 2020-11-21 – via Michigan State University Libraries, African e-Journals Project. (About Sierra Leone and Nigeria)
