= Time 106.6 =

Former local radio station in England

Coordinates: 51°30′30″N 0°35′18″W

England
- Broadcast area: Slough, Maidenhead and Windsor
- Frequency: 106.6 MHz

Programming
- Format: Adult contemporary

Ownership
- Owner: Lyca Media II

History
- First air date: 21 May 1993
- Last air date: 19 October 2015

Time 106.6 was an Independent Local Radio station for Slough, Maidenhead and Windsor. Time played a variety of music from the 1970s, 1980s, 1990s, 2000s and today, with a strapline of 'all time favourites'. The station was available on FM on 106.6 MHz and online.

== History ==
The station launched as Star FM in 1993 (later one of six local stations owned by the UKRD Group to be branded under the 'Star' name), managed by Valerie Handley. Originally it was known as Star 101.6 before becoming Star 106.6, broadcasting from Slough's Observatory Shopping Centre in studios located on the first floor above Primark which are now the home of Asian Star Radio.

Star FM was sold to the London Media Company in May 2006, a subdivision of the Sunrise Radio Group, owners of Sunrise Radio, who re-branded the station into Time 106.6, in line with three other Sunrise-owned stations in Romford, Bexleyheath and Lewisham. It operated out of studios at Radio House in Southall during this time.

In January 2014, Time 106.6 and its sister stations entered Administration, and were acquired for an estimated £2m on 4 February 2014 by Lyca Media II Ltd, a subdivision of Lycamobile. The station has retained its branding as 'Time 106.6FM'.

== Programming ==
Time 106.6FM broadcast live output 24 hours a day. Traffic & travel news was from INRIX read by Gary Scott on the Breakfast show & Nicola Richards at Drivetime. The news programming was sourced locally & read by James Brydges and Kirsty Manley. Some bulletins were from Sky News. Sport was from Sports Media. Kevin Hatchard read on the breakfast show with Steve Bell at Drivetime & Saturday Sportszone. Paul Owens was the Programme Controller and Morning Presenter, other Presenters at the time of closure were Steve Lee, Steve Dean, Bruce Montgomery, Richard Linton, Gary Elsden, Jason Reynolds, Mark Denholm, Andy Smith, Ben Shoveller, and Tony Fatania.

== Performance ==
Audience data for period ending September 2015 TSA: This radio station broadcast to a survey area of 305,000 adults (aged 15+). Reach: It was listened to by 16,000 people (5.0%) each week. Hours: Each listener tuned in for 3.0 hours per week - a total of 50,000. Share: In its area, it had a 1.1% market share. Rajar

== Closure ==
The station ceased live broadcasting at 8pm on 15 October 2015, citing "unforeseen circumstances with the transmitter and aerial".

Time 106.6 was broadcasting from a temporary studio, at the Queensmere shopping centre in Slough with plans for permanent studios to be built in the centre. Other Lyca Media radio stations formerly known as Sunrise Radio and Kismat Radio, now known as Lyca Radio 1458 & Lyca Gold 1035 respectively are broadcasting from temporary studios in South London until they move to a permanent London home.

=== See also ===
- Time 107.5
