= Leicester Peak transmitting station =

Leicester Peak
- Location: Freetown, Sierra Leone
- Coordinates: 8°26′58″N 13°13′28″W
- Built: 1978

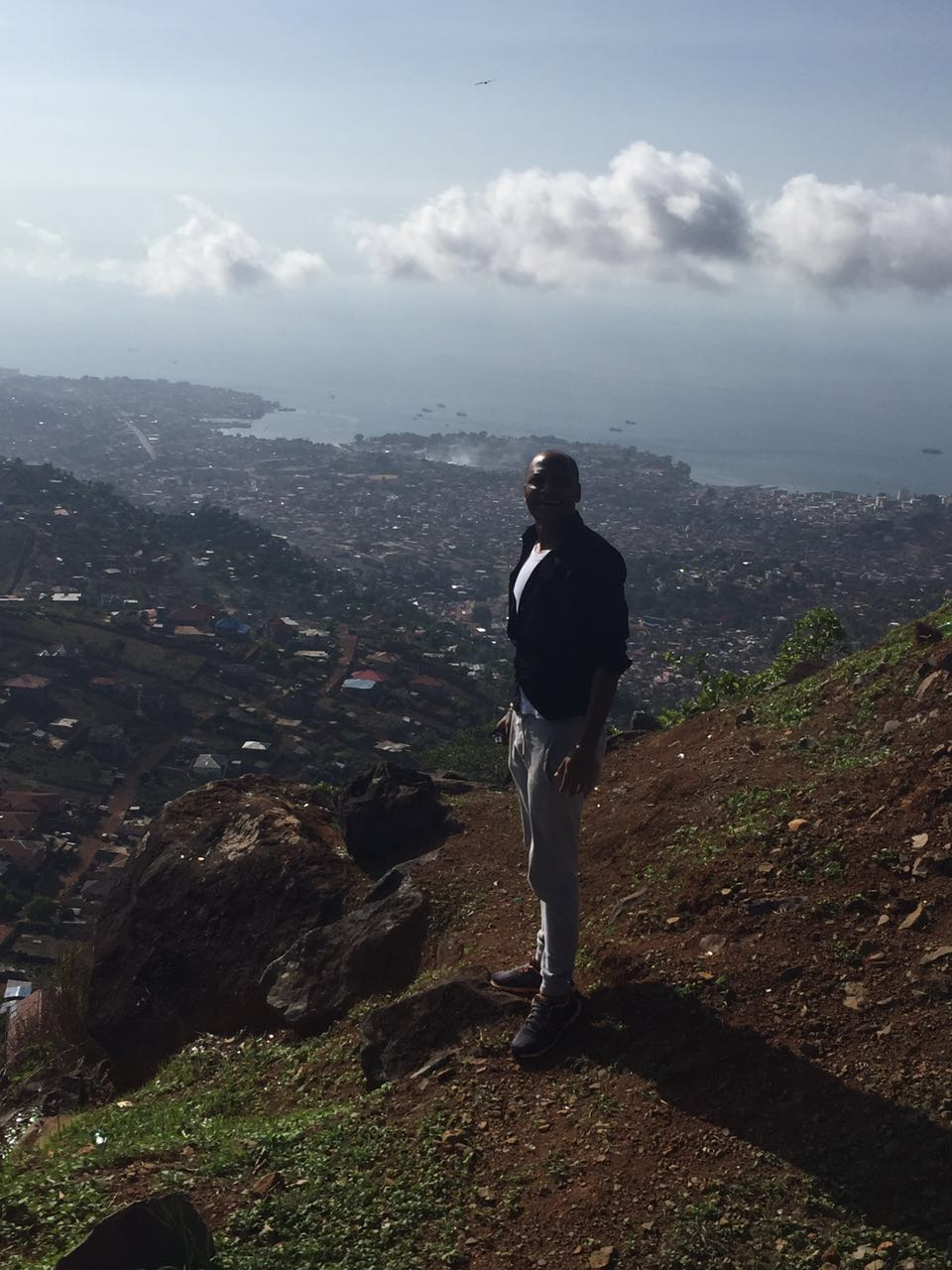
View on Freetown from Leicester Peak.

The Leicester Peak transmitting station is a broadcast transmitting station and communications relay station located near Freetown, Sierra Leone. The site is owned by the Sierra Leone Broadcasting Corporation the country's state broadcaster. It is now the primary (for SLBC) transmitting station providing broadcast services for the Western Area of Sierra Leone. Previously the SLBC operated a shortwave transmitting station in Waterloo and a shortwave/mediumwave station in Goderich.

The Leicester Peak site is located on top of the mountain of the same name which is 564m above sea level. The closest settlement is Leicester village to the south-west of the mountain. Because of its height, coverage extends as far as Makeni and Bo to the east. Signals can be received in Conakry in neighbouring Guinea.

Apart from the SLBC's own services, the site is leased to other broadcast stations and operators of communications systems such as the state run Sierratel, mobile telephone operators and Internet Service Providers.

== History ==
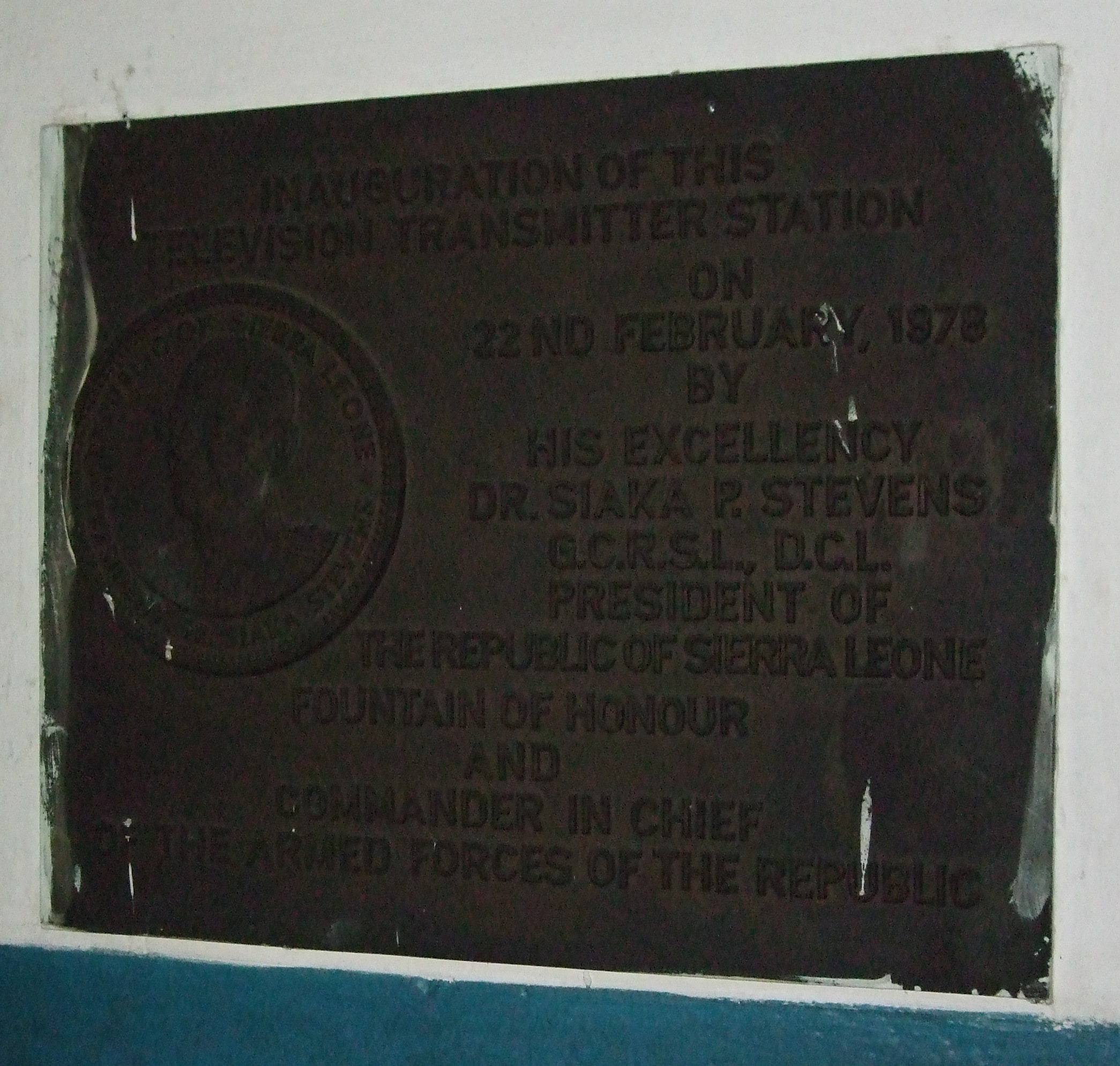
This sign is displayed in the entrance area of the SLBC Leicester Peak transmitting station. It commemorates the opening of the site by former president Siaka Stevens.

The site was originally constructed by the British Marconi company. At that time it provided a new VHF colour television service, replacing the original monochrome service which launched in 1963. An access road was built from the Regent Road near Leicester village. The building also included its own power generating room since there was no public supply on the mountain at that time. A Francis & Lewis self-supporting triangular tower was used for the antenna systems. The site was inaugurated by President Siaka Stevens on 22 February 1978.

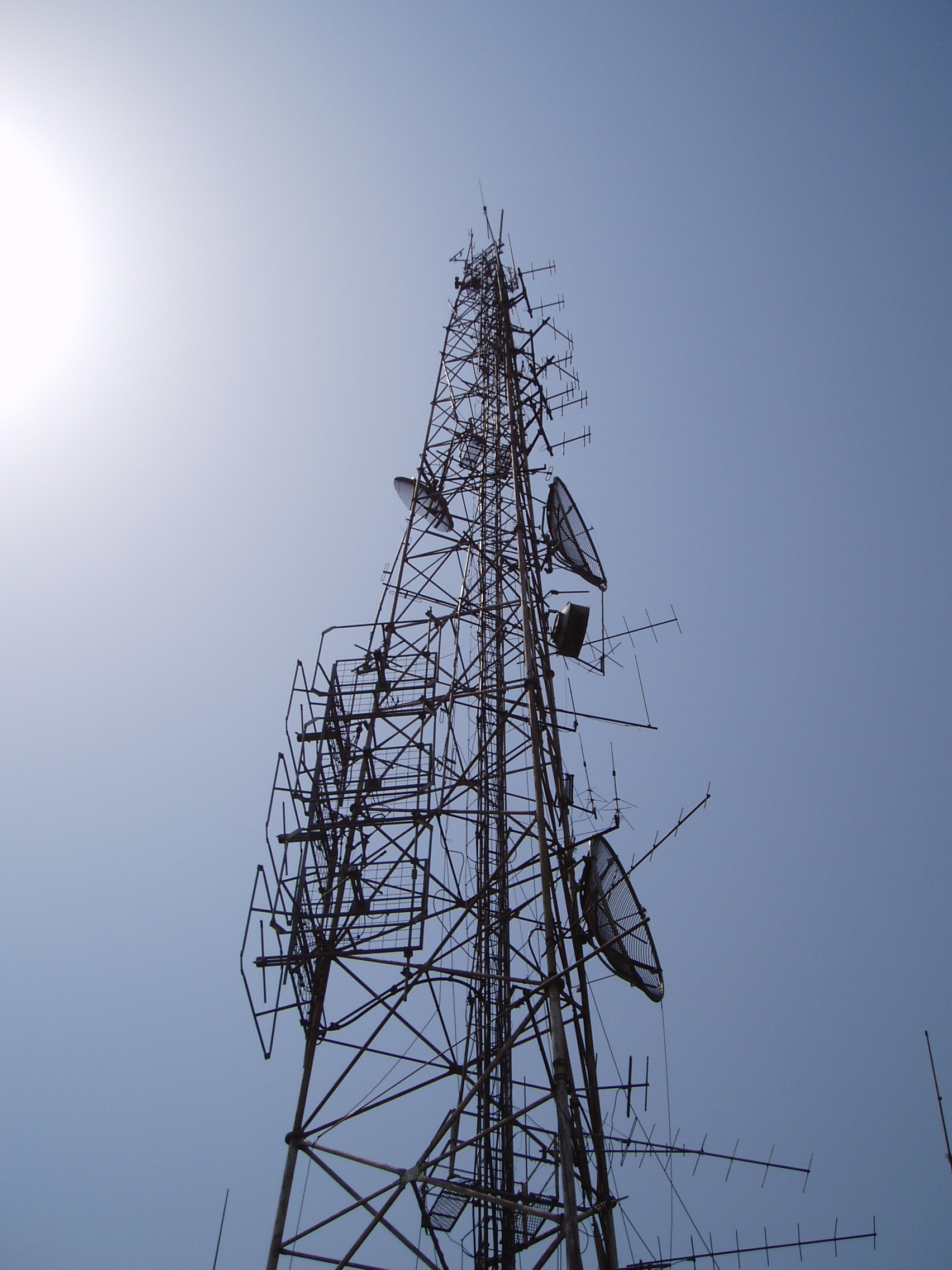
Leicester Peak Francis & Lewis (shortened) tower in 2005.

The station was never directly attacked by rebels during the countries civil war which started in the early 1990s. However as a result of the conflict, the condition of the site deteriorated. Because of a misunderstanding the Nigerian air-force attacked the site, believing it to be under rebel control. Damage was limited to one of the upper legs of the transmission tower which was hit by a shell.

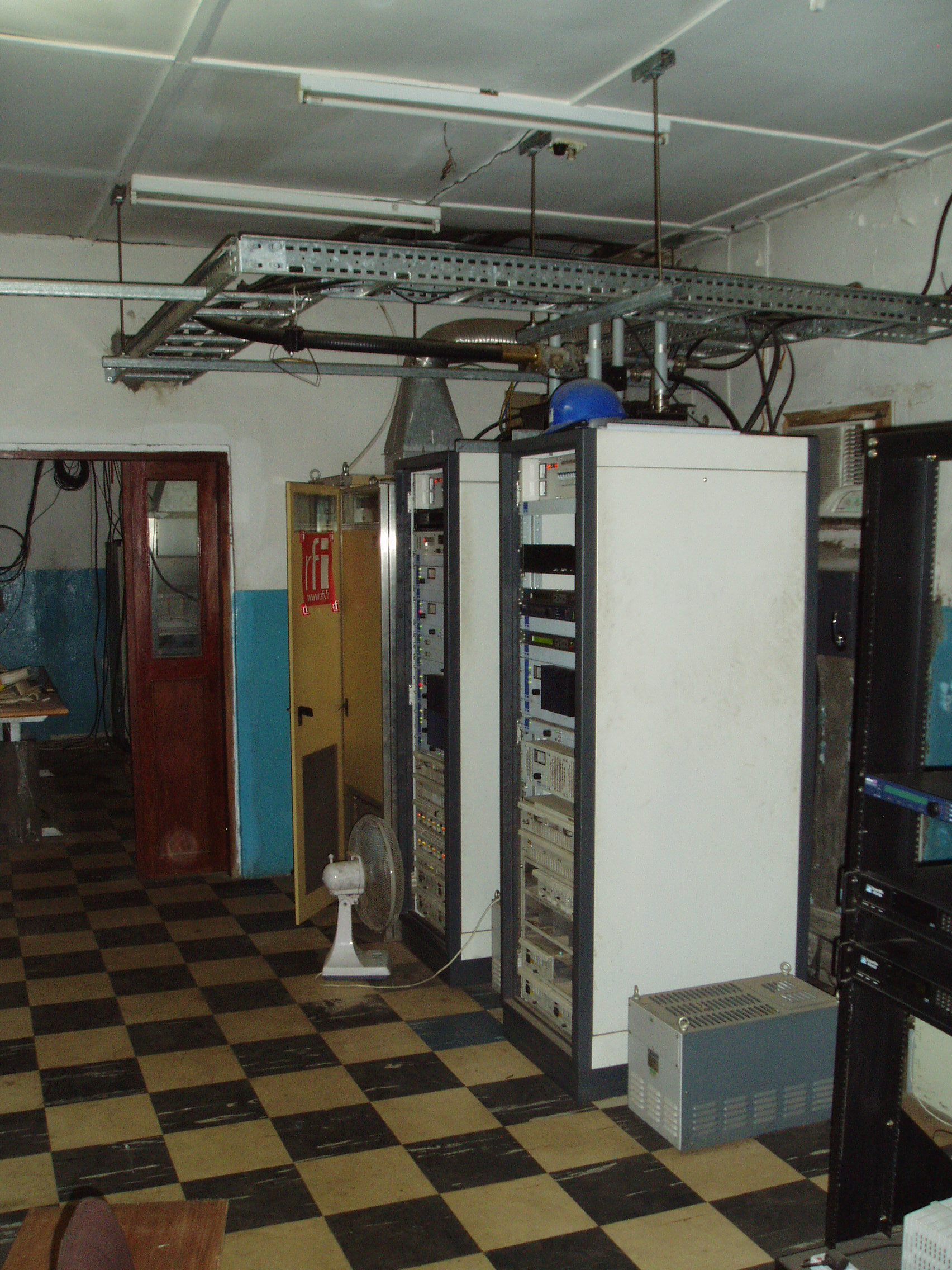
The FM transmitter room in 2005.

By the end of the war the VHF television service had been replaced with a lower power UHF transmitter. A low power FM transmitter was also installed for the radio service. However, the site was in very poor condition at this time. Meanwhile, Radio France International had installed a transmitter to cover Conakry with a highly directional antenna system. Even with Sierra Leones war, RFI found it easier to operate there than in Guinea.

In 1999, the British Department for International Development had started a project to re-equip and train the Sierra Leone Broadcasting Service as it was then known. This project included the reconstruction of the radio broadcast systems at the site. British companies Sound Broadcast Services (now part of Eddystone Broadcast) and Alan Dick & Co were given the contract to build the radio services. SBS provided the transmitters, radio links and initial technical expertise, whilst Alan Dick & Co provided the antenna systems. The war briefly delayed the project which was eventually completed during 2001.

The damaged tower leg was replaced by Alan Dick & Co. The tower was also shortened since it was not structurally safe. SBS installed a 2 kW FM transmitter for SLBS and also a 2 kW transmitter for the BBC World Service. Both were combined into the new panel antenna system installed by Alan Dick & Co. The SLBS service was sent to the site by UHF link and the BBC service was received by satellite.

In the following years other operators installed towers and systems at the site under rental agreements with SLBS. The UN was also allowed to install a large tower and buildings for its own communications systems and UN radio station. Eventually the UN Radio was absorbed into SLBS which was renamed SLBC. The UN's technical facilities were handed over to SLBC.

In July 2006, Capital Radio Sierra Leone started broadcasting from Leicester Peak again under a rental agreement with SLBS, also combining into the existing SLBC/BBC antenna system.

SLBS had considerable difficulties providing power for the site. They struggled with maintenance and providing fuel for the station with Capital Radio providing fuel for some time. Despite the site being about 30 years old, it had never received a utility power supply. Because of the problems, Capital Radio started a project to install a medium voltage power line to the site. With the assistance of the National Power Authority and with materials provided by the Japanese the power line was completed in September 2010.

The original low power UHF television transmitter was replaced with a pair of transmitters, allowing SLBC to launch a second general entertainment channel.

== Services available ==
The following broadcast services are transmitted from SLBCs Leicester Peak facilities:

Service	System	Frequency	Transmitter Power	ERP
SLBC Radio	FM	100.0 MHz	2 kW	8 kW
SLBC TV 1	UHF PAL I	CH27		
SLBC TV 2	UHF PAL I	CH31		
BBC World Service	FM	94.3 MHz	2 kW	8 kW
Capital Radio	FM	104.9 MHz	2 kW	8 kW
Radio France International	FM	89.9 MHz		
Voice of Islam	FM	102.0 MHz		
Ahmadiyya Muslim Radio	FM	91.7 MHz		
