= Buzz Asia =

English Asian music radio station

Buzz Asia was a rhythmic contemporary Asian music radio service, broadcasting to London on 963 and 972 medium wave. As of mid-2013 the name used on its Web site was "Buzz Radio". It is the fourth station to occupy that position, following Viva, Liberty Radio and Club Asia. Sunrise Radio is currently broadcasting on this frequency

== History ==
Prior to 2002, the frequencies had been occupied by a light pop music and female-skewing talk service initially named "Viva 963", which was renamed "Liberty Radio" in 1996 following its takeover by Mohamed Al-Fayed. The station was then sold again, to Brazilian religious group the Universal Church of the Kingdom of God (UCKG).

Liberty did not become available on digital radio (due to regulations at the time preventing stations owned by religious groups from launching onto DAB); as a result their licence was not eligible for the automatic renewal which was granted to operators carrying their existing AM/FM stations on DAB. It was re-advertised, and awarded in November 2002 to Club Asia, a service proposing a rhythmic dance and urban music service aimed at London's Asian population. Liberty Radio ceased broadcasting on medium wave (MW) in July 2003, and live transmission of the Club Asia service began in September of that year following three months of automated programming.

Club Asia collapsed into administration in August 2009, and the station stopped live programming and played only back-to-back music, resulting in it being found in breach of its licence obligations by Ofcom. The operators of Club Asia subsequently negotiated a takeover of the frequencies by the parent firm of Sunrise Radio and Kismat Radio, the Litt Corporation, and the new owners relaunched the station as Buzz Asia. Following the takeover and the resumption of presented content, Ofcom ruled the station had returned to compliance with its licence conditions.

As of 2011 Buzz Asia continued to broadcast on medium wave and online; it had not at that time secured a digital radio licence (its siblings Sunrise Radio and Kismat Radio were available on DAB in London, Sunrise on CE London and Kismat on DRG London, with a third Litt service, Punjabi Radio, carried on Switch London having replaced Yarr Radio).
