= Country 1035 =

Former country music radio station in London

- England
- Broadcast area: London
- Frequency: 1035 kHz

Programming
- Format: Country music

History
- First air date: 1 September 1994
- Last air date: 2002

Country 1035 was a country music based Independent Local Radio station based in London, England.

== History ==
Announced as Europe's first dedicated country music radio station, Country 1035 began broadcasting across Greater London on 1 September 1994. Transmissions were on frequency 1035 kHz on the medium wave band. Martin Satterthwaite, the station’s senior music consultant, speaking to Billboard magazine prior to the launch envisaged a playlist of predominantly American artists divided equally between established and newer, less familiar. Roger Trapp writing in The Independent described country music in the station's proposed playlist as "pretty much anything you want it to be". He questioned whether the genre would be attractive to advertisers, given country music had an image problem in Britain.

After airing test transmissions the first voice officially heard on air was the station's chairman John Wellington. In his opening words he noted that the station will "fulfill a long awaited need". It was the first terrestrial station in the UK to broadcast Country music 24 hours a day, 7 days a week (although TV and Radio stations had been broadcasting the genre daily for sometime). Garth Brooks, who was at the peak of his fame, officially opened the station after Wellington's speech with the words "On behalf of all the Country music artists and Country music fans. Hi folks, this is Garth Brooks and you've got it tuned to the newest radio station in London. It's Country 1035 and I officially declare it open. I wish you guys a long success and a lot of happiness, cause that's the true measure of success".

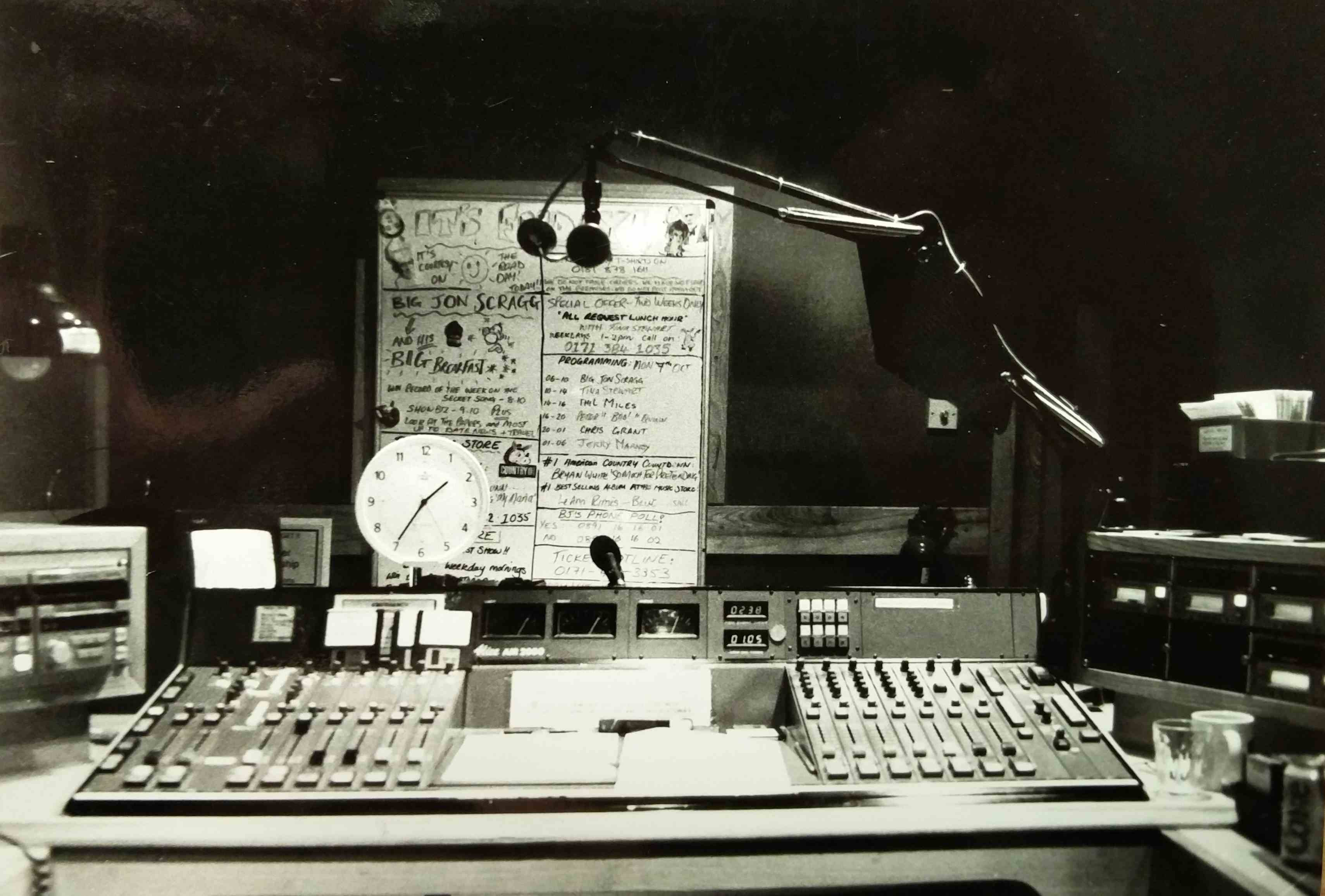
Country 1035 On Air Studio circa 1995

The first song played was Brooks' Friends in Low Places (which was voted #1 country song ever by listeners of the station a few months later), the second was another Brooks song The Dance. The station's early line up included presenters Chris Grant, Jon Scragg, Randall Lee Rose, Peter Quinn, Paul Hollingdale, David Allan and Bryan Chalker. Chalker was subsequently dismissed for disciplinary reasons. David Allan left the station, going back to BBC Radio 2 and in an article for Country Music People magazine he criticized the station for not playing enough true country music.

Advertising take-up was slow as potential advertisers, particularly record labels awaited publication of audited audience figures, however, success was reported for concert ticket sales promoted on air. Luxembourg-based CLT Multimedia (RTL), who previously held a minority stake had assumed ownership by the beginning of 1995.

RTL made strenuous attempts for nearly three years to turn it around. An initially over-formulaic, heavy-rotation playlist damaged ratings, but a subsequent, more audience-friendly format saw station share rise, and at one time, even exceed its competitor Jazz FM.

RTL decided to automate the presentation and to broadcast from the studios of Talk Radio in London's West End. This resulted in huge savings for the loss-making station. The presenter line-up at this time included Tina Stewart, Keith Francis (station manager), Randall Lee Rose, Gary Ziepe, Miles Long, and Michele Stephens. Sales and administrative functions were amalgamated into RTL's Talk Radio and Atlantic 252. Eventually, RTL sold RTL Country 1035 as it had become known to Ritz Records, at one time the UK record label for Daniel O'Donnell, but problems within the RMG group resulted in the mother company becoming close to bankruptcy.

By 2002 the audience had reduced from over 250,000 listeners a week in 1999 to only 75,000 listeners by 2001. The new management at Ritz also tinkered with the transmitter and reduced the station's coverage considerably as a result. Ritz eventually sold the station in a deal which saw the staff go unpaid to Mean Radio, part of Vince Power's Mean Fiddler group. It was in turn purchased by Asian radio tycoon Avtar Lit, owner of Sunrise Radio, who renamed it Easy 1035. After a year or so of broadcasting a mixed easy listening/country format, Mr Lit applied to Ofcom to transfer Easy to a digital platform, thus freeing the 1035 frequency for Kismat Radio, a further Asian-language station. "Easy 1035" stopped broadcasting on the analogue AM service in 2003 but continued broadcasting (now called Easy Radio London) via its digital frequency. In 2008 this too was closed.
