= Voice acting =

Performing voice-overs to a character or provide information

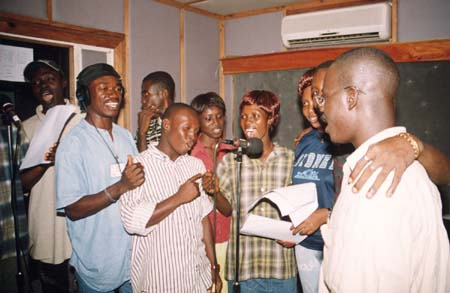
The cast of the Sierra Leonean radio soap opera Atunda Ayenda

Voice acting is the art of performing a character or providing information to an audience with one's voice. Performers are often called voice actors/actresses in addition to other names. (Note: Other names include voice artists, VO artists, VO talent, dubbing artists, voice talent, voice-over artists, and voice-over talent.) Examples of voice work include animated, off-stage, off-screen, or non-visible characters in various works such as films, dubbed foreign films, television shows, video games, animation, documentaries, commercials, audiobooks, radio dramas and comedies, amusement rides, theater productions, puppet shows, and audio games.

The role of a voice actor may involve singing, most often when playing a fictional character, although a separate performer is sometimes enlisted as the character's singing voice. A voice actor may also simultaneously undertake motion-capture acting. Non-fictional voice acting is heard through pre-recorded and automated announcements that are a part of everyday modern life in areas such as stores, elevators, waiting rooms, and public transport. Voice acting is recognized as a specialized dramatic profession in the United Kingdom, primarily due to BBC Radio's long and storied history of producing radio dramas.

== Types ==
=== Character voices ===
The voices for animated characters are provided by voice actors. For live-action productions, voice acting often involves reading the parts of computer programs, radio dispatchers or other characters who never actually appear on screen. With an audio drama, there is more freedom because there is no need to match a dub to the original actor or animated character. Producers and agencies are often on the lookout for many styles of voices, such as booming voices for more dramatic productions or cute, young-sounding voices for trendier markets. Some voices sound like regular, natural, everyday people; all of these voices have their place in the voiceover world, provided they are used correctly and in the right context.

=== Narration ===
In the context of voice acting, narration is the use of spoken commentary to convey a story to an audience. A narrator is a personal character or a non-personal voice that the creator of the story develops to deliver information about the plot to the audience. The voice actor who plays the narrator is responsible for performing the scripted lines assigned to them. In traditional literary narratives (such as novels, short stories, and memoirs) narration is a required story element; in other types of (chiefly non-literary) narratives (such as plays, television shows, video games, and films) narration is optional.

=== Commercial ===
One of the most common uses for voice acting is within commercial advertising. The voice actor is hired to voice a message associated with the advertisement. This has different sub-genres such as television, radio, film, and online advertising. The sub-genres are all different styles in their own right. For example, television commercials tend to be voiced with a narrow, flat inflection pattern (or prosody pattern) whereas radio commercials, especially local ones, tend to be voiced with a very wide inflection pattern in an almost over-the-top style. Marketers and advertisers use voice-overs in radio, TV, online adverts, and more; total advertising spend in the UK was forecast to be £21.8 billion in 2017. Voice-over used in commercial adverts had traditionally been the only area of voice acting where "de-breathing" was used. This means artificially removing breaths from the recorded voice, and is done to stop the audience being distracted in any way from the commercial message that is being put across. However, removal of breaths has now become increasingly common in many other types of voice acting.

=== Translation ===
Dub localization is the practice of voice-over translation, in which voice actors alter a foreign-language film or television series. Voice-over translation is an audiovisual translation technique, in which, unlike in Dub localization, actor voices are recorded over the original audio track, which can be heard in the background. This method of translation is most often used in documentaries and news reports to translate words of foreign-language interviewees.

=== Automated dialogue replacement ===
Automated dialogue replacement (ADR) is the process of re-recording dialogue by the original actor after the filming process to improve audio quality or reflect dialogue changes, also known as "looping" or a "looping session". ADR is also used to change original lines recorded on set to clarify context, improve diction or timing, or to replace an accented vocal performance. In the UK, it is also called "post-synchronization" or "post-sync".

=== Automated announcements ===
Voice artists are also used to record the individual sample fragments played back by a computer in an automated announcement. At its simplest, each recording consists of a short phrase which is played back when necessary, such as the "mind the gap" announcement introduced on the London Underground in 1969, which is currently voiced by Emma Clarke. In a more complicated system, such as a speaking clock, the announcement is re-assembled from fragments such as "minutes past", "eighteen", and "p.m." For example, the word "twelve" can be used for both "Twelve O'Clock" and "Six Twelve". Automated announcements can also include on-hold messages on phone systems and location-specific announcements in tourist attractions.

=== AI-generated and AI-modified voices ===
Since the late 2010s, software to modify and generate human voices has become more popular. In 2019, AI startup Dessa created the computer-generated voice of Joe Rogan using thousands of hours of audio from his podcast, while video game developer Ubisoft used speech synthesis to give thousands of characters distinguished voices in its 2020 game Watch Dogs: Legion, and Google announced that same year their solution to generate human-like speech from text.

Most voice actors and others in the entertainment industry have reacted negatively to this development due to the threat it poses to their livelihood. The 2023 SAG-AFTRA strike included negotiations between the union and Hollywood studios about the regulation of AI, as well as discussions with video game studios about new terms that would protect voice actors who specialize in that field. Although SAG-AFTRA heralded the deal it struck with AI company Replica Studios as a breakthrough due to its supposed ability to give actors more control over licensing their voice and how it may be used, the deal received backlash for its actual lack of protections from prominent voice actors such as Steve Blum, Joshua Seth, Veronica Taylor, and Shelby Young. The use of AI voices in video games and animation has also been criticized in general by voice actors such as Jennifer Hale, David Hayter, Maile Flanagan, and Ned Luke.

AI voices have caused concern due to the creation of believable audio deepfakes featuring celebrities or other public figures saying things they did not actually say, which could lead to a synthetic version of their voice being used against them. In October 2023, during the start of the British Labour Party's conference in Liverpool, an audio deepfake of Labour leader Keir Starmer was released that falsely portrayed him verbally abusing his staffers and criticizing Liverpool. That same month, an audio deepfake of Slovak politician Michal Šimečka falsely claimed to capture him discussing ways to rig the upcoming election. In January 2024, voters in the New Hampshire Democratic presidential primary received phone calls featuring an AI-generated voice of U.S. President Joe Biden that tried to discourage them from voting.

== Voice acting by country ==
=== United States ===
In films, television, and commercials, voice actors are often recruited through voice acting agencies.

=== United Kingdom ===
The UK banned broadcasting of the voices of people linked to violence in Northern Ireland from 1988 to 1994, but television producers circumvented this by simply having voice actors dub over synchronized footage of the people who had been banned.

=== Japan ===
Voice actor (Japanese: 声優, Hepburn: Seiyū) occupations include performing roles in anime, audio dramas, and video games; performing voice-overs for dubs of non-Japanese movies; and providing narration to documentaries and similar programs. Japan has approximately 130 voice acting schools and troupes of voice actors who usually work for a specific broadcast company or talent agency. They often attract their own appreciators and fans, who watch shows specifically to hear their favorite performer. Many Japanese voice actors frequently branch into music, often singing the opening or closing themes of shows in which they star, or become involved in non-animated side projects such as audio dramas (involving the same characters in new storylines) or image songs (songs sung in character that are not included in the anime but which further develop the character).

=== Brazil ===
Most of the films in the theaters are dubbed in Portuguese, and most Brazilians tend to prefer watching movies in their native language. Many voice actors are also dubbing directors and translators. To become a voice actor in Brazil, one needs to be a professional actor and attend dubbing courses. Some celebrities in Brazil have also done voice acting.

=== Iran ===
Voice acting in Iran is divided into three categories. Voice over Persian films, voice over Iranian animations, and dubbing of films and animations related to other countries (in non-Persian language) In the first category, due to the lack of facilities for simultaneous recording of sound while filming a film, the voice actors spoke instead of the film actors. Although this type of voice is related to years ago and now with the increase of facilities, it is possible to record the voice of the actors at the same time, but even today, sometimes the voice of the voice actors is used instead of the main actor. The tail of the voice is on Iranian animations, and like in other parts of the world, voice actors speak instead of animated characters. But most of the activities of Iranian voice actors are in the field of dubbing foreign films. In this case, the main language of the film is translated into Persian, and the dubbing director compiles the sentences according to the atmosphere of the film and the movement of the actors' mouths and other such cases, and finally the voice actors play roles instead of the actors' voices.

== See also ==
- National Audio Theatre Festival
- Adventures in Voice Acting
- The Magic Behind the Voices
- I Know That Voice
- Voice-over
- Dubbing
