= Liberty Radio =

- London; England

Programming
- Format: Easy Listening, R'n'B, Classical, pop, and religious

Ownership
- Owner: Universal Church of the Kingdom of God

History
- First air date: 3 July 1995
- Former names: Viva 963 (1995–1996); 963 Liberty (1996–2000)

Links
- Website: www.libertyradio.co.uk

Liberty Radio is a UK radio broadcaster and company based in London, England that, as of 2013, is transmitted free to air from the Astra 2F satellite at 28.2° East to most of Europe, and on the Internet, but not on analog or DAB terrestrial radio. The station is also available to subscribers to BSkyB on the Sky EPG at LCN 186. The company started as Viva 963, broadcasting on terrestrial radio, predominantly for women, and was later renamed. It lost its terrestrial broadcasting licence in 2002 after being acquired by the Universal Church of the Kingdom of God (UCKG); the broadcasting slot was taken over by Club Asia, with different content.

== History ==
=== Viva 963 ===
The station started on 3 July 1995 as Viva 963, a service of talk and pop aimed at women devised by public relations consultant Lynne Franks. It broadcast on 963 kHz on medium wave from a transmitter at Lea Bridge Road, Leyton. A second transmitter, broadcasting on 972 kHz, was later added at Glade Lane, Southall, Middlesex.

=== 963 Liberty (Fayed) ===
In May 1996 the station was sold to Mohammed Al Fayed, owner of Harrods and chairman of Fulham Football Club, who renamed the station Liberty Radio. For a time it broadcast commentaries of Fulham FC's home and away football games.

==== Presenters ====
Presenters before UCKG ownership:

- Toby Anstis
- Zoe Ball
- Simon Bates
- Sean Bolger
- Bruno Brookes
- Nino Firetto
- Emma Forbes
- David Hamilton
- Mike Hollingsworth
- Caron Keating
- Carol McGiffin
- Sally Meen
- Anna Raeburn
- Chris Reardon
- Richard Skinner
- Penny Smith
- Michele Stephens
- Anthea Turner

=== Liberty Radio (UCKG) ===
In 2000, Al Fayed sold the station to the Universal Church of the Kingdom of God (UCKG);

==== The broadcasting slot ====
UCKG were not allowed to change the format to religious programming, but did broadcast programmes linked to their UCKG Help Centres in the evenings. In February 2001 Ofcom issued a "Yellow Card" to Liberty Radio over religious content and giving undue prominence to its owners, the UCKG, breaching two rules of the Advertising and Sponsorship Code. Changes were made as a result.

At the time there were rules preventing stations owned by religious organisations from owning digital radio licences in the UK. Therefore, Liberty could not move onto DAB and did not get an automatic license renewal, so their broadcasting licence was readvertised. It was awarded on 12 November 2002 to Club Asia, who took over 963 and 972 MW at midnight on 3 July 2003. Club Asia went into administration in August 2009 and was taken over by Sunrise Radio Group, itself owned by Litt Corporation, who branded it "Buzz Asia", later "Buzz Radio".

==== Programming ====
Since the loss of the terrestrial broadcasting licence Liberty Radio has been broadcasting Christian music, and a variety of talk shows on the Internet, Sky Digital and the Eurobird satellite.
