= Club Asia =

- London; England
- Frequencies: 963 and 972 kHz

Programming
- Format: Asian music

History
- First air date: 2003
- Last air date: 2010

Club Asia was a London-based radio station, mainly targeted at the Asian youth market.

== History ==
Club Asia was awarded a licence to broadcast on MW in London by The Radio Authority in 2002 and went on air at midnight on 3 July 2003. Club Asia broadcast in English. At their peak, they had 202,000 listeners and broadcast on 963 and 972 AM and online. In 2009, Ofcom was notified that the radio station had gone into administration. Club Asia continued to broadcast, whilst under the management of an accountancy firm who were tasked to find a buyer to hopefully revive the channel. It was taken over by Sunrise Radio Group, itself owned by Litt Corporation who branded it "Buzz Asia", later "Buzz Radio".
