= Time 107.5 =

Coordinates: 51°34′37″N 0°11′0″E

Romford; United Kingdom
- Broadcast area: East London and West Essex
- Frequency: 107.5 MHz
- RDS: TIME1075

Ownership
- Owner: Nation Broadcasting; Lyca Media

History
- First air date: 18 May 1998; 27 years ago
- Last air date: 1 August 2025; 5 months ago
- Former names: Active 107.5 FM; Soul City FM

Links
- Website: www.time1075.net

Time 107.5 was an Independent Local Radio station, based in Romford and broadcasting to East London and West Essex.

Time played a variety of music from the 1960s to the present day. News reports were live, in-house bulletins, with local stories covering the London boroughs of Barking and Dagenham, Havering and Redbridge.

== History ==
The station launched as Active 107.5 FM and, after ten years of planning, went on air on 18 May 1998, broadcasting to East London and in particular to the London Boroughs of Havering and Barking & Dagenham. Active FM played a mix of new and old pop music with an emphasis on soul and rhythm and blues; evening shows catered for specialist musical tastes covering genres including disco, garage and contemporary club music. The station had its own local news team which would broadcast from Studio 2.

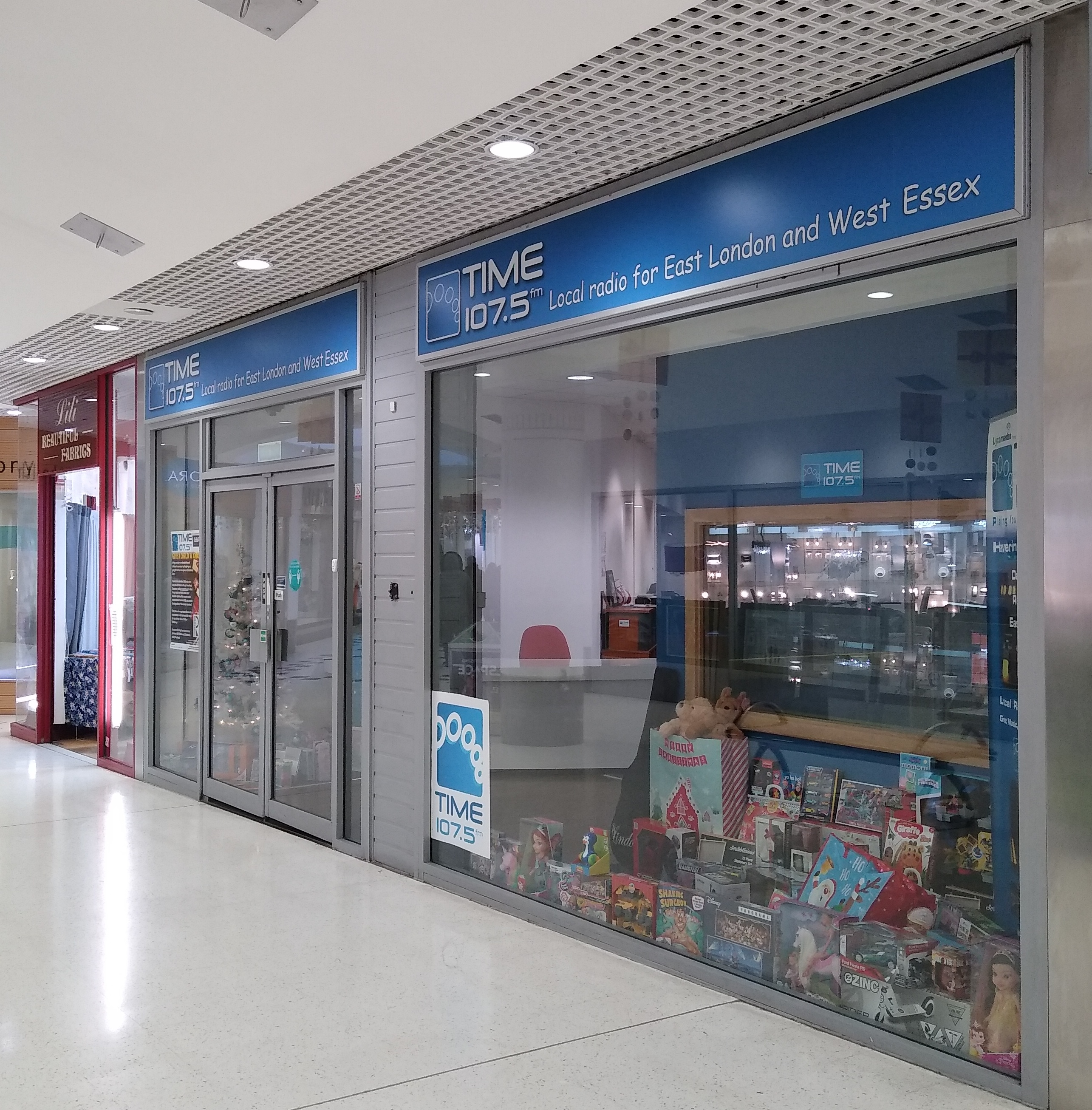
Time at Lambourne House

The station was run out of Lambourne House, Romford and its transmitter was located on the roof.

Active FM was bought by UKRD Group which later ran the station as Soul City FM. Soul City was then acquired by the London Media Company, a subdivision of the Sunrise Radio Group in April 2004, resulting in a format and name change to Time.

From June 2009 until April 2012, weekends on Time FM were produced by Centreforce as Centreforce Sessions, with shows and DJs including Jumping Jack Frost, Artful Dodger, Soul Syndicate (Peter P, Chris Phillips), Matt Jam Lamont, and Mr Buzzhard. A change of management at Time FM saw the relationship parting company.

In January 2014, Time entered administration, along with its sister stations, Time 106.6, Sunrise Radio and Kismat Radio. On 4 February 2014, they were acquired for an estimated £2m by Lyca Media, a subdivision of Lycamobile.

In 2024, the station celebrated its 20th anniversary under the brand of Time FM.

== Closure ==
On 1 August 2025, it was announced that Nation Broadcasting had acquired Time from Lyca Media and that the station was to close down at 2pm that day. The frequency was taken over by Nation Radio London, and marked the end of the Time after operating for 21 years. The last song played on the station was Unfinished Sympathy by Massive Attack.
