= AudioNow =

- Company type: Private
- Industry: Telecommunications
- Founded: 2008
- Headquarters: Washington, D.C., USA
- Area served: Worldwide
- Key people: Elan Blutinger (President) & (CEO)
- Number of employees: 10-50(June 2014)
- Website: audionow.com

AudioNow is a company which connects diaspora communities to their countries of origin and news in their native languages through mobile access to radio and television content. Founded in 2008, AudioNow is headquartered in Washington, D.C. The business currently operates on a call-to-listen platform.

== History ==
AudioNow was founded in 2008 by Elan Blutinger. Blutinger has been a managing director of Alpine Consolidated, LLC since 1996 and led the launch, IPO, and sale of multiple public travel companies in the US and the UK: He subsequently was a Director at Hotels.com and chaired the Special Committee that sold the company to IAC/ InterActiveCorp.

After the 2010 Haiti earthquake, the business to expand to Haiti. Partners include the United Nations, BBC, Voice of America, Al Jazeera, IMG College, C-SPAN, Adventist World Radio, Radio Free Asia, and Radio France Internationale.

In June 2018, AudioNow was acquired by Zeno Radio, now known as Zeno Media.
