= Yarr Radio =

British digital radio station

Coordinates: 51°30′19″N 0°22′30″W

Programming
- Format: Asian

Ownership
- Owner: Sunrise Radio Group

History
- First air date: 2003
- Last air date: 2008

Yarr Radio was a British music radio station aimed at a young Asian audience, which broadcast from 2003 until 2008 on digital radio in various regions of the United Kingdom, and on Sky Channel 187.

Launched in 2003 by Indo-Canadian singer Jazzy B, it was called 'London's First Young Asian Hit Music Station'. The original presenters of 'Yaar Radio' were: Maya, Ranj Rekhi, Sonia Paneser, Danny Deol, Dee Singh, Kim Boss, Vinny Virdee (aka: Jas Rao or Jas 'The Man'), Ellia Khan (aka: Noreen Khan). The management had a policy of playing only Asian music, consisting of "the latest Bhangra and Bollywood mixes" and "the hottest urban, fusion and R&B".

Part of the Sunrise Radio Group, it was based at Sunrise's headquarters in Southall, west London. On some frequencies it was replaced by Sunrise's Punjabi Radio.
