= United Nations Radio =

Audio service of the United Nations

- Type: International public broadcaster

Ownership
- Owner: United Nations

History
- Launch date: 1946

Coverage
- Availability: International

Links
- Website: news.un.org/en

United Nations Radio was a radio service of the United Nations, established on 13 February 1946. In 2017, United Nations Radio and the UN News Centre merged to form UN News, which produces daily news and multimedia content in Arabic, Chinese, English, French, Swahili, Portuguese, Russian, Spanish, and Hindi. UN News Audio continues to produce daily news and feature stories on the work of the United Nations and its member states in eight languages, distributing content to more than 2,000 partner radio stations worldwide.

== History ==
The League of Nations' "Radio Nations" broadcasts began in 1929, initially transmitted via the Dutch station PCJJ. From 1932, broadcasts originated from the League's own transmitters, HBL and HBP, located in Switzerland. The final Radio Nations broadcast took place in 1939.

United Nations Radio began broadcasting in 1946 from temporary studios and offices at the United Nations Headquarters in Lake Success, New York. Its initial call sign was: "This is the United Nations calling the peoples of the world."

United Nations Radio was formally established by a United Nations General Assembly resolution on 13 February 1946. Resolution 13 (I) mandated the Department of Public Information to establish the service, stating that the United Nations could not achieve its objectives unless the peoples of the world were fully informed of its aims and activities.

In November and December 2016, surveys conducted by United Nations Radio among smaller radio stations indicated that, due to limited resources for producing original content, United Nations material was considered essential. In many cases, it was reported to be the sole source of international news available to those broadcasters.

== Transmission ==
=== Founding partnerships ===
In 1946, the International Broadcasting Division of the United States Department of State began transmitting the full proceedings of the Security Council and the Economic and Social Council via shortwave to international audiences. News bulletins and feature programmes were broadcast for 9 to 12 hours daily in the United Nations' then five official languages—Chinese, English, French, Russian, and Spanish. Arabic was added as a broadcast language in 1974.

As it lacked its own transmission facilities, United Nations Radio initially entered into arrangements with established broadcasting organizations to relay its programmes to different regions. These included the International Service of the Canadian Broadcasting Corporation (1946–1952), the European Service of the British Broadcasting Corporation (BBC), and Voice of America (1953–1985).

=== Shortwave broadcasts ===
Beginning in 1960, United Nations Radio started transmitting its own programmes via shortwave. Initially, it leased transmitters in France, Switzerland, Italy, and the United States. In 1963, it acquired transmission facilities with significantly greater reach and effectiveness, enabling broadcasts to Africa, Europe, Latin America, the Middle East, and parts of Southeast Asia.

Shortwave broadcasts were temporarily suspended in 1986 due to a sharp increase in transmission costs. Following the suspension, United Nations Radio distributed its programmes on cassette tapes. Annual distribution increased from approximately 110,000 cassettes in the late 1980s to about 205,000 by 1997. Thereafter, cassette distribution declined substantially as electronic delivery methods became more widely available and cost-effective.

== Live programme and new formats ==
=== Live programme ===
On the occasion of the UN General Assembly's Millennium Summit, United Nations Radio launched live radio broadcasts from United Nations Headquarters in New York. The broadcasts were produced in the six official United Nations languages, as well as Portuguese. The 15-minute daily current affairs programmes included news, interviews with United Nations officials, government representatives, diplomats, and ambassadors, as well as background reports, feature segments, updates from peacekeeping missions, and coverage of activities undertaken by United Nations organizations worldwide.

These live broadcasts were distributed via satellite and telephone feeds and aired by national and regional radio networks in many parts of the world, in addition to being made available through the United Nations Radio website. Shortwave services were reintroduced to support live transmissions to audiences in the Middle East and North Africa, but were suspended again in 1997 due to declining shortwave listenership in those regions.

=== Web and social media ===
United Nations Radio distributes its content free of charge to hundreds of radio stations worldwide via the internet. Broadcast-quality audio files are available for download from its website, and programmes are distributed through RSS feeds and SoundCloud. United Nations Radio also maintains a presence on social media platforms, including Twitter and Facebook.

=== Call-to-listen ===
In December 2013, United Nations Radio programmes became available through a call-to-listen service operated by AudioNow. The service allows users to dial a local telephone number to access audio content, including live audio from the United Nations General Assembly and the United Nations Security Council.

The UN News Reader app, one of the most widely used United Nations mobile applications, provides daily updates on breaking news and events through multimedia content, including video, text, photographs, and audio. The app is fully multilingual and is available in Arabic, Chinese, English, French, Kiswahili, Portuguese, Russian, and Spanish.

=== Mobile apps ===
In September 2014, the parent office of United Nations Radio, the United Nations Department of Public Information, released two mobile applications, including UN Audio Channels for Android and iOS, in cooperation with AudioNow. Similar to the call-to-listen service, the applications allow users to listen to United Nations Radio programmes as well as live audio feeds from the United Nations General Assembly and the Security Council.

== UN Radio's Anti-Apartheid Programme Section ==
In 1977, the UN General Assembly established the Anti-Apartheid Programme Section (AAPS). The purpose of the AAPS was to counter broadcasts by the Government of South Africa and to support international efforts aimed at ending apartheid. The AAPS pursued this objective by producing radio programming intended for direct broadcast into South Africa, Namibia, and other countries in the region.

Daily programmes began in March 1978. Initially, seven 15-minute scripts were produced in English and subsequently translated into five South African languages: Zulu, Afrikaans, Xhosa, Sesotho, and Setswana. The programmes featured interviews with individuals from South Africa and other countries, including participants from the United States, who were involved in the international campaign against apartheid.

The AAPS was restructured in 1988, and in 1989 the programme was renamed One South Africa. In Resolution 49/38, the UN General Assembly decided that, following the establishment of a united, non-racial, and democratic South Africa, United Nations information activities in support of the eradication of apartheid should be discontinued.

== UN Radio and peacekeeping operations ==
United Nations Radio first produced radio and television programmes related to a peacekeeping mission in 1989. The initiative was led by former United Nations High Commissioner for Human Rights Sérgio Vieira de Mello, who was later killed in the bombing of the United Nations offices in Iraq in August 2003.

In 1992, United Nations Radio established its first in-country broadcasting facility as part of the United Nations Transitional Authority in Cambodia (UNTAC). The operation was led by João Lins de Albuquerque, a Swedish-Brazilian journalist. The primary role of Radio UNTAC was to explain the mission's mandate and to support the peace process and electoral activities underway in Cambodia.

Radio services have since become an important communications component of the Department of Peacekeeping Operations (DPO). As of 2019, United Nations radio services operated in several mission areas, including Afghanistan, the Central African Republic (CAR), the Democratic Republic of the Congo (DRC), Mali, and South Sudan. These services provide information on peacekeeping operations to international news media and also serve as broadcast partners in post-conflict and hard-to-reach areas.

== Languages ==
UN News Arabic reports on issues including migration, refugees, and peace and security, with a focus on audiences in the Middle East. To engage younger audiences who increasingly use digital platforms, content is adapted for social media distribution. In 2017, the Arabic team covered major developments related to Iraq, Libya, Syria, and Yemen, including early reporting on Saudi Arabia's decision to lift the ban on women driving.

The Chinese Language Unit strengthened strategic partnerships with major broadcasters such as China National Radio, Radio Beijing, Radio Shanghai, and China Radio International. Through live link-ups with China National Radio during peak listening periods, United Nations content reached audiences estimated in the millions. On Earth Day, UN News programmes on environmental issues were shared with Radio Shanghai, reaching an estimated audience of 50 million listeners in central and eastern China. The Unit also expanded its outreach beyond China through the Global Chinese Broadcasting Cooperation Network, partnering with more than 40 Chinese-language radio stations worldwide. Stations in cities such as New York and Melbourne regularly used its news and feature content, and special programming around Chinese New Year reached audiences in North America and Australia.

UN News English resumed its podcast series in 2017, developing it into a weekly programme addressing topics such as counter-terrorism, peacekeeping, and cyberbullying. Between September and December 2018, English-language United Nations radio products recorded approximately 250,000 downloads by broadcast partners and direct listeners.

UN News French audio content was downloaded at least 100,000 times worldwide in 2017 by radio partners and individual users. High levels of interest were recorded for stories on United Nations experts addressing anti-terrorism legislation, the appearance of the humanoid robot Sophia at a United Nations event, developments in francophone Africa, and coverage of health and climate change issues, including the United Nations Climate Change Conference held in November 2017. During the Secretary-General's visit to the Central African Republic in October 2017, the French Language Unit provided extensive online, video, and audio coverage.

The Kiswahili Language Unit serves audiences in Eastern Africa and the Swahili-speaking diaspora. In 2017 and 2018, it established new partnerships with traditional and online radio stations and digital platforms, including outlets in Somalia and the United Republic of Tanzania. Following attacks on Tanzanian peacekeepers in the Democratic Republic of the Congo in December 2017, the Unit worked with the United Nations Information Centre in Dar es Salaam to disseminate information and coordinate outreach with partners such as the Tanzania Broadcasting Corporation.

The Portuguese Language Unit produces a daily news programme, Destaque ONU News, which includes interviews with Lusophone ambassadors and senior United Nations officials. Audience engagement is facilitated through digital platforms, allowing listeners to submit comments and questions. Some segments have been rebroadcast by other media outlets, including an interview with the President of Brazil that aired nationally on the Brazilian network NBR and was used by other outlets.

The Russian Language Unit produces news and feature content on global issues on the United Nations agenda, including migration, climate change, human rights, peacekeeping, sustainable development, and gender equality, as well as topics of particular relevance to Russian-speaking audiences.

The Spanish Language Unit produces daily radio news and multimedia features covering topics such as migration, human rights, and sustainable development. Coverage of the opening of the 2017 high-level session of the General Assembly included interviews with the President of Panama, the Vice President of Argentina, and the Minister of Foreign Affairs of Mexico. In December 2017, the Unit reported on the Preparatory Stocktaking Meeting for a Global Compact on Migration held in Puerto Vallarta, Mexico, in cooperation with the United Nations Information Centre in Mexico City. The most widely read Spanish-language stories that year related to the United Nations response to the September earthquake in central Mexico.

The Hindi Language Unit has expanded its output in Hindi, with increased coverage of global issues, climate change, and development.

Further information on the activities of United Nations Radio is available in the most recent report of the Secretary-General on the work of the Department of Global Communications' news services.

== Awards and honours ==
In 1997, The Child Sex Trade, a four-part series examining the global issue of the commercial sexual exploitation of children, won a silver medal at the New York Festivals International Radio Programming competition. In the same year, two other United Nations Radio programmes, Female Condom and Teenage Reproductive Health and Namibia, were finalists in the competition.

In 1999, the United Nations Radio programme UNESCO Funds Documentary on Links between Calypso and High Life Music received a bronze medal at the New York Festivals International Radio Programming competition.

The Portuguese-language service received awards for its weekly programmes Africa na ONU and UN in Action, which featured interviews with government leaders, ministers, ambassadors, and United Nations officials.

In 2007, a silver medal was awarded to the feature 200th Anniversary of the Abolition of the Trans-Atlantic Slave Trade. The programme also received a certificate of honourable mention from the Association of International Broadcasters (AIB).

In 2008, the United Nations Radio series on climate change was a finalist in the Association for International Broadcasting (AIB) Awards.
