= Spectrum Radio =

Coordinates: 51°28′28″N 0°8′47″W

The Spectrum Radio Network
- London; England
- Broadcast area: Greater London
- Frequency: DAB

Programming
- Format: Multi Language Speech and Music

Ownership
- Owner: Spectrum Radio Group

History
- First air date: 1990 - 2021

Links
- Website: The Spectrum Radio Network official site at the Wayback Machine (archived 30 December 2018)

Spectrum Radio was a multi-ethnic radio network based in London. It catered to over 20 different ethnic communities, each of which were aired on the station at various times of the week.

Spectrum Radio was distinguished by its multiethnic, foreign language programmes, many of which had been on air since its launch in 1990.

The station launched as a MW-only station on 558 kHz and in its early months, the station clashed with pirate station Radio Caroline, which used the same frequency. This caused more interference to Spectrum than vice versa. Spectrum threatened to sue the Independent Broadcasting Authority, which then allowed Spectrum to temporarily broadcast on 990 kHz alongside 558 kHz. Eventually, Caroline left 558 kHz and moved to 819 kHz prior to it stopping broadcasting on 5 November 1990. Consequently, the temporary transmitter on 990 kHz was switched off.

In 2019, the station switched to DAB only.

In 2019 the station's studio moved to a new facility on London's South Bank.

In February 2020, the station was issued with a winding-up order by the High Court and its broadcasting licence was therefore suspended. The online broadcast was discontinued after the last date on 18 November 2021.

== Network ==
- Spectrum Radio (DAB and online)
- Chinese Spectrum (online, two hours a day)
- Sout-al-Khaleej (DAB and online)
- Spectrum World Music Radio (online)
