= Atunda Ayenda =

Radio soap opera broadcast in Sierra Leone

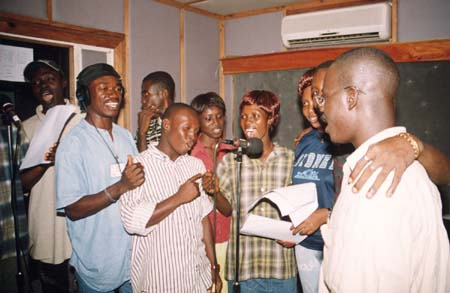
- The cast from 2004, including Alhaji Sesay, third from the left, Winstinia Johnson, fifth from left, Patricia Fallah Hollist, centre
- Other names: Lost and Found
- Genre: Soap opera
- Running time: 15 minutes
- Country of origin: Sierra Leone
- Language: Krio
- Written by: Emrys Savage
- Produced by: Emrys Savage
- Recording studio: Talking Drum Studio, Sierra Leone
- Original release: December 2001 – Present
- No. of episodes: 3024 (As of June 2015)
- Website: Atunda Ayenda Website
- Podcast: Atunda Ayenda on the internet

Atunda Ayenda is a radio soap opera broadcast on 27 stations within Sierra Leone and through the Internet. It was created by Talking Drum Studios and was the first radio soap opera aired in Sierra Leone. In the Mandingo language, Atunda Ayenda means Lost and Found. The plot on the show revolved around young people and their experiences of the Sierra Leone Civil War, with story-arcs addressing contemporary issues such as HIV/AIDS.

== Background ==
In 2000, Sierra Leone's 10-year Civil War came to an end leaving the country to rebuild itself and enact a disarmament programme. Search for Common Ground, an international non-profit organization, started Talking Drum Studios to produce media content to address problems experienced after the war and promote peace and reconciliation. In December 2001, it produced Atunda Ayenda, which means lost and found in the Mandingo language, the first radio soap opera aired in Sierra Leone. The show quickly gained significant popularity; according to a 2004 survey of Sierra Leonean radio listeners, 90 percent of respondents said that they regularly listened to the show and 80 percent discussed the content with family and friends.

== Narrative ==
The narrative is divided into stages with story arcs reflecting current events in Sierra Leone. Each stage is written independently in the period just prior to broadcasting so that the stories are always up-to-date. The show's narrative is a reflection of the real experiences of people throughout Sierra Leone with the writers travelling to remote areas of the country to research the stories. The plot of the show revolves around young people and their experiences of the Sierra Leone Civil War and reconstruction after the war. Individual story-arcs address contemporary issues such as HIV/AIDS. The show was originally scripted by Kemoh Daramy but is now written by a team of writers.

=== Characters ===
- Dragon - An ex-combatant who did not take part in the disarmament process.
- Matuka - Was held prisoner by Dragon but escaped to Nigeria.
- Tapia - A hot tempered character who coaches football and is in love with Matuka.

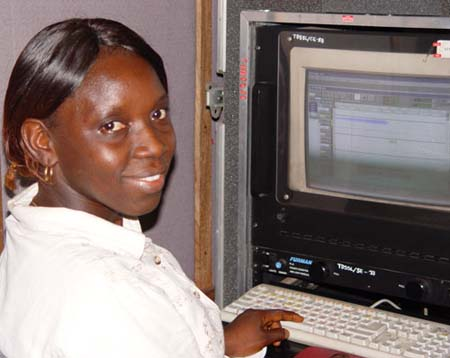
Isastu Mansaray who plays Safie in the show and assists in producing the show. She is also a radio programme editor.

== Production ==
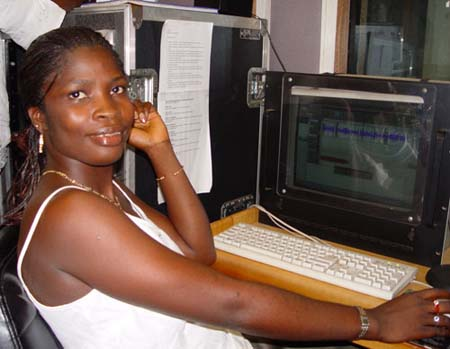
Isata Mahoi, an actress for Atunda Ayenda, shown editing radio programmes at Talking Drum Studio in Freetown

The show is normally produced in the Krio language, but Talking Drum Studios has joined partners with the BBC World Service to produce an English version of the show. The original producers of the show were Desmond During and Emrys Savage with assistants including Isastu Mansaray. Some members of the cast, for example Isata Mahoi who plays Mamy Saio, also work as programme editors.

=== Format ===
The show is broadcast weekly, from Monday to Friday, on 21 radio stations within Sierra Leone and on the Internet in an MP3 format. Old episodes of the show following from programme 850 are also available on the Internet. The show is 15 minutes in length when its theme tune is included and is usually broadcast on an evening prime-time slot at 17:45, GMT. A 30-minute summary of the show is also broadcast during the weekend.

== See also ==
- Media of Sierra Leone
