= Sound Broadcast Services =

SBS
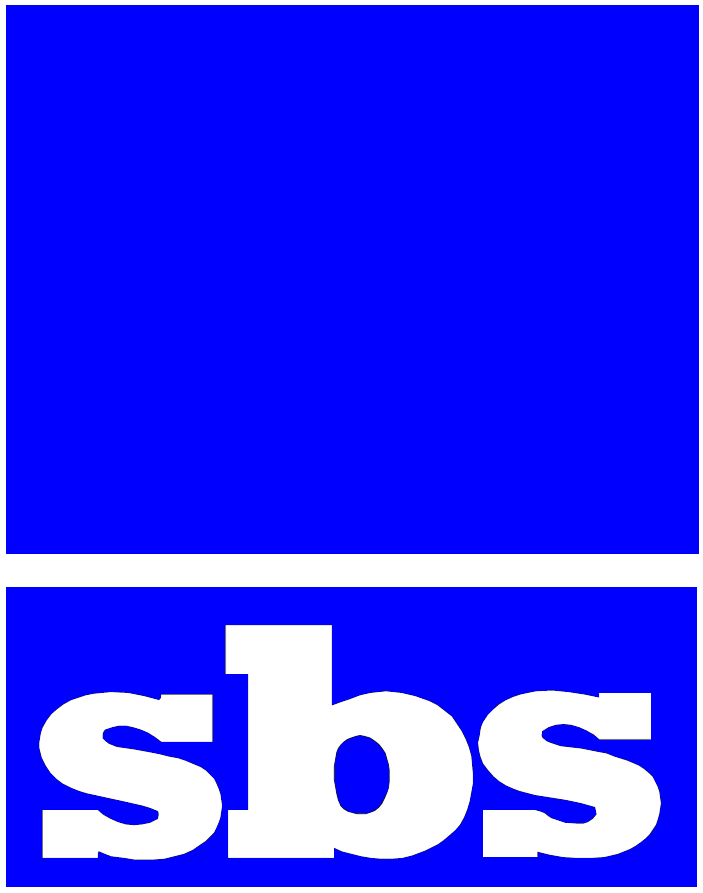
- Company type: Private
- Industry: Broadcasting
- Headquarters: United Kingdom

Sound Broadcast Services (SBS) was a British electronics manufacturer that produced terrestrial radio broadcast equipment. Originally known as Sound Broadcast Services, the name was later invariably abbreviated to SBS and more commonly written as lower case sbs in the company's documents and marketing materials.

The company enjoyed considerable success in the UK market during the 1990s following deregulation of the UK broadcast radio industry. The company's products were also exported globally, particularly to developing countries. SBS was a major supplier to BBC World Service.

== Products and services ==
The company produced a range of products that were associated with FM broadcast radio transmission. During the 1990s the company produced audio limiting and stereo encoding products at a time when commercial broadcasters throughout the UK were needing to upgrade this type of equipment.

The company's products were:

- MaXiM Deviation limiter (Mk1 and Mk2 versions)
- MPX5 Stereo encoder (Mk1 and Mk2 versions)
- MPX5/OS Stereo encoder with overshoot correction
- FM25/RDS RDS encoder using RE OEM module
- FMB10 RDS encoder using Aztec OEM board
- Guardian Audio failure detector
- Guardian 2 Audio failure detector
- FMLP2 2W FM exciter with optional limiter/stereo encoder
- FM10 10W FM exciter with optional limiter/stereo encoder
- FM25 17W FM exciter with optional limiter/stereo encoder
- FM30 30W FM exciter with optional limiter/stereo encoder
- TX400 Radio link transmitter with optional limiter/stereo encoder
- RX400 Radio link receiver (Mk1 and Mk2 versions)
- PA125 125W FM amplifier
- PA250 250W FM amplifier
- TAConn RS232 remote control for RDS TA flag switching
- MicLim Microphone limiter based on the MaXiM limiter

The company produced a range of cable head end equipment for multichannel audio distribution. These included low power versions of the FMLP2 and FM10 exciters and a 4-channel version called Quadmod. Passive combiners were also made with varying numbers of inputs.

Towards the end of the brand's life, a range of audio interface products were manufactured. This product line was sold to the Sonifex company in 2006 and marketed under the ProAVM brand.

By 2019 only the RX400 link receiver remained available from Eddystone Broadcast.

The FM30 exciter was a development from the original FM25. The main difference being the amplifier module and an uprated mains transformer. The FM25 first appeared in 1990. The production of these exciters ran for more than 20 years with many hundreds being produced.

The design of most of the products used sealed cases (no ventilation) and linear power supplies. This resulted in very long life, particularly when used in dirty environments. The sealed cases meant that the electronics were protected from dirt and corrosion. Products such as the exciters, audio failure detectors and radio links remain in regular use around the world, despite being 20–30 years old.

== Locations ==
SBS started in North London. It moved to Hastings, East Sussex in 1991. In 2002, the company was moved to Pitchill near Evesham in Warwickshire with Eddystone Radio. A few years later, SBS/Eddystone moved to Alcester in Warwickshire where the company remains.

== History ==
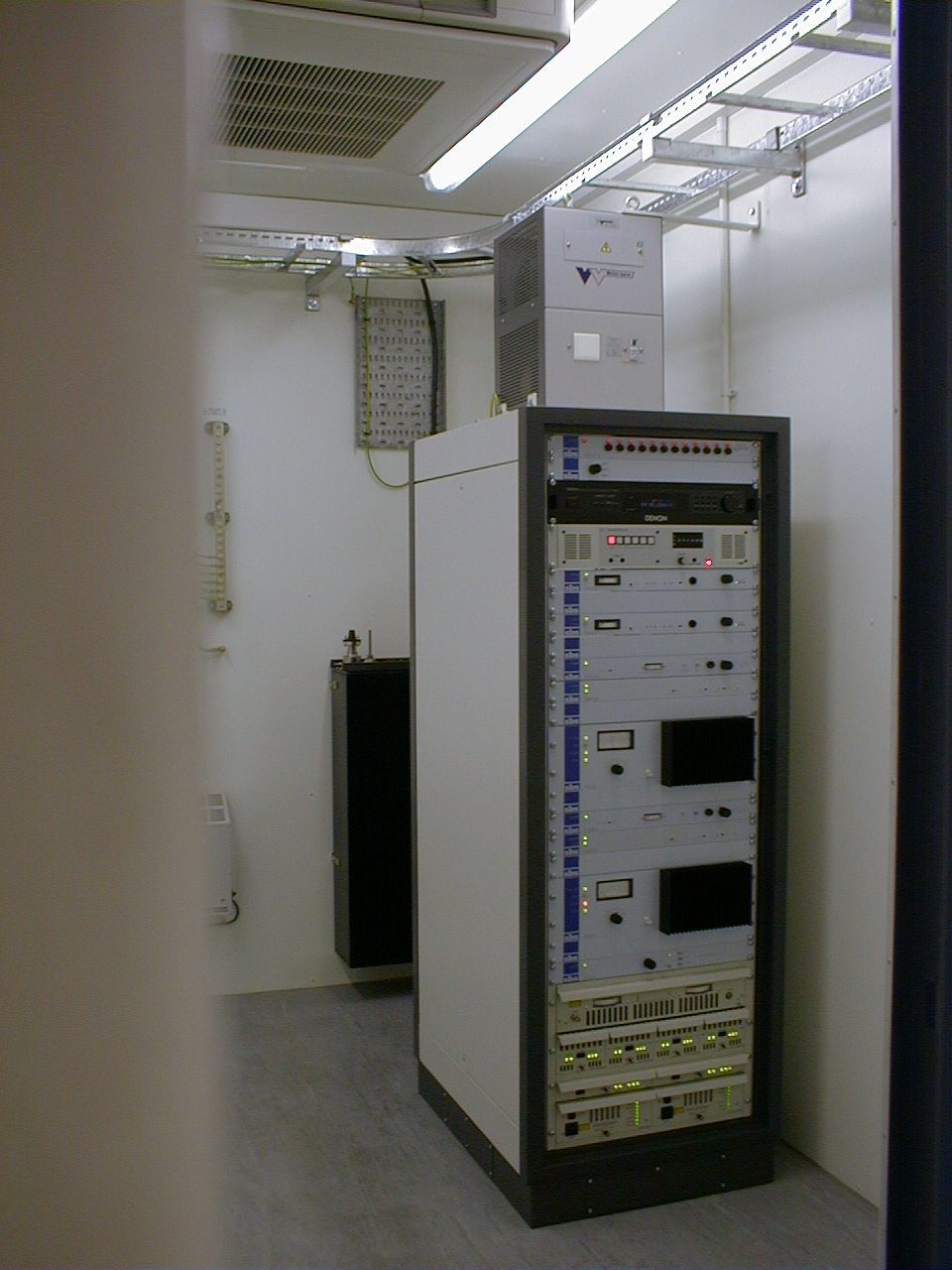
SBS FM transmitter deployed to Sierra Leone

The company started in the late 1980s, supplying equipment to unlicensed broadcasters. At that time it was based in north London. The highly regulated broadcast industry in the UK at that time meant that the market was not open to small companies. At the end of the 1980s, the UK radio industry was deregulated, with new 'Incremental Radio' stations licensed and launched from 1989 onwards. Stations were no longer required to sign transmission contracts with the government owned transmission operator, the IBA. During 1991, the company relocated to Hastings in East Sussex. Throughout the 1990s, SBS became one of the biggest suppliers and installers for the newly licensed stations.

Also during the 1990s, SBS became sales agents for some other equipment such as audio processors. The increased competition in the UK radio industry meant that existing commercial radio stations needed to upgrade their equipment. SBS dominated this upgrade market with audio processors and the MaXiM/MPX5/OS products.

Towards the end of the 1990s, the company started exporting through a number of agents. Its products were particularly popular in developing countries. This was also aided by BBC World Service, which had started using SBS equipment.

In 2002, SBS effectively merged with Eddystone Radio, the UK's oldest manufacturer of high power radio transmitters (in fact SBS had taken over Eddystone). In the years after the merger, it was the SBS brand that gradually disappeared as the products were replaced with new Eddystone versions. SBS had also relocated to Worcestershire with Eddystone.

The company's original web sites (www.sbs.uk.com and www.sbsfm.com) no longer exist.
