= Time 106.8 =

Time 106.8 (now defunct)
- England
- Broadcast area: Thamesmead
- Frequency: 106.8 MHz

Programming
- Format: Adult contemporary

Ownership
- Owner: Sunrise Radio Group

History
- First air date: 18 March 1990
- Last air date: 4 April 2009

Time 106.8 was an Independent Local Radio station located in the south-east London and north-west Kent area of England, which broadcast to Greenwich and Bexleyheath in London and Dartford and Gravesend in Kent on 106.8 FM, and ceased transmission in April 2009.

== Background ==
The radio station originally broadcast as Radio Thamesmead using the local Rediffusion cable television system (channel L). It was financed originally by the Home Office, due to a fear of flooding before the Thames Barrier was finished and featured weekly alarm rehearsals. The first studio was in the Ecumenical Centre and run by the Rev Patrick Forbes who presented a mainly classical music breakfast show. Nick Hennegan, broadcasting as Nick Mobbs, was a volunteer who took over the breakfast show after the Rev Forbes moved to another parish. Australian Frank Warren arrived back at his home in Thamesmead and worked with the voluntary sector to develop the station, turn it into a youth project and moved to studios in Tavy Bridge (where Willow Bank School now stands). It was also broadcast in Greenwich for a time on a cable television service there. Towards the end of the 1980s, new management were brought in by the station's backers (the Community Service Volunteers NGO and Thamesmead Town company) with a view to campaigning and applying for a permanent broadcast (FM) license. The station was managed by Bob Smith (deceased)) and David Stanley headed the engineering/technical side.

An Incremental Radio license was applied for in 1989. One other applicant, Greenwich Community Radio Meridian applied, but Radio Thamesmead won the license which it had long campaigned for. The volunteers of the radio station were given the opportunity to vote on a new name for the station. It was felt that the Thamesmead name should be dropped to reflect the much wider service area which covered a large part of south east London. RTM Radio was the name chosen by the majority.

Following upgrading of the station's facilities to meet the IBA engineering code, the station commenced broadcasts from its existing studios at Tavy Bridge, Thamesmead, as RTM Radio transmitting on 103.8 F.M. Transmission was from Shooters Hill, one of the highest points in London. The station was the first broadcaster in the UK to use an independent company (Sound Broadcast Services) to provide its FM transmission systems.

The station negotiated a change in frequency from 103.8 to 106.8 MHz following persistent interference from BBC local radio transmissions from Bedfordshire. The station also changed from vertical polarisation to circular using a custom designed antenna from SBS.

RTM stayed at Tavy Bridge until moving to the Thamesmead Town offices in Harrow Manor Way during April 1994. The new studios and production facilities were designed and built in house by Frank de Pellette and Jon Lucas.

The station then moved to Basildon Road on the outskirts of Plumstead, sharing its premises with sister station South London Radio 107.3. By then, Time 106.8 was in the final five years of its life and was owned by the Sunrise Radio Group.

== History ==
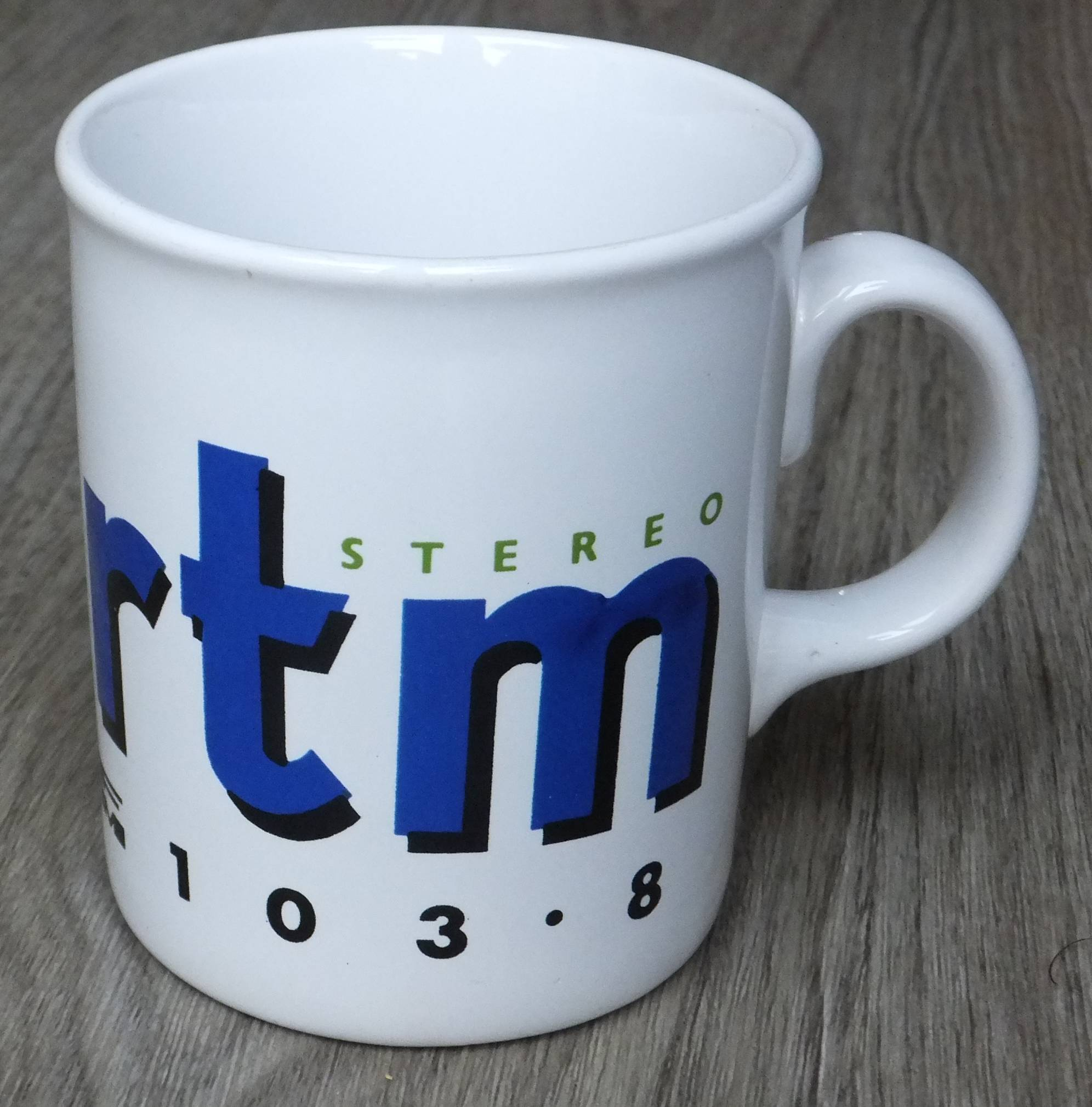
RTM Radio mug bearing original logo.

The station launched on the FM radio band as RTM Radio on 18 March 1990, having previously broadcast on the area's local cable television service as Radio Thamesmead, and intended to fulfil a community-style remit, with any profits generated being invested in local regeneration projects. Prior to its full time license, the station operated the first FM restricted service licence in the UK from 23 to 24 July 1988 on 104.3 MHz during the weekend of the Thamesmead Town Show in Southmere Park. The broadcast came from a vintage double decker bus in the showground. The 1W ERP transmitter was in a caravan on a slightly raised area of the park.

RTM changed its name to Millennium 106.8 in 1997, to link in with the upcoming celebrations at the Millennium Dome in Greenwich, having successfully amended its minority-orientated programming obligations with the Radio Authority. The station was put up for sale in June 1999, and was purchased by the Milestone Group in 2000. Fusion Radio Holdings later took reins of the station.

Millennium was rebranded as Time 106.8 at the beginning of 2003, in a move to associate the station with local town Greenwich's connection with the Greenwich Meridian. Avtar Lit's Sunrise Radio Group purchased the station in March 2004.

From 1 April 2021 the station's FM frequency of 106.8MHz has been licensed to a drive-in cinema in Billericay, north-east London.

== Performance and subsequent closure ==
The station consistently struggled to perform in a highly competitive London market in terms of audience figures, with its market share steadily declining in RAJAR performance since the middle of 2005. In its final survey at the end of 2008, Time recorded an audience of 13,000 listeners, representing a market share of 1%.

In an unusual move, the Sunrise Radio Group put the station up for sale via a message on its website in mid-October 2008, and following disputed claims a buyer had been found, Time 106.8 ceased broadcasting at midnight on Saturday 4 April 2009.

== Past Notable Presenters ==
- John Kennedy (Moved to XFM, now Radio X)
- Keir Simmons (ITV News)
- Roger Day (Boom Radio)
- Simon Beale (Heart UK)
