= Sierra Leone Broadcasting Corporation =

Sierra Leone Broadcasting Corporation (SLBC)
- Type: Television and Radio network
- Country: Sierra Leone
- Availability: across Sierra Leone
- Headquarters: Freetown, Sierra Leone
- Owner: Government of Sierra Leone
- Launch date: 1934 (radio); April 1963 (television)
- Former names: Sierra Leone Broadcasting Services
- Official website: www.slbc.gov.sl

The Sierra Leone Broadcasting Corporation (SLBC) is the national radio and television broadcaster in Sierra Leone. It is owned by the government of Sierra Leone and is a branch of the Sierra Leone Ministry of Information and Communications. It is theoretically regulated by the Independent Media Commission (IMC). The SLBC primarily broadcasts the national television and regional radio service from its headquarters in the New England neighborhood of Freetown. Regional stations provide FM radio services in Bo, Kenema, Kailahun, Makeni, Magburaka and Koidu.

Currently the Freetown headquarters produces 2 television channels for Freetown, one of which is intermittently distributed by satellite for relays in Bo, Kenema and Makeni. The other is a general entertainment channel (films etc.) A radio service is transmitted from Leicester Peak transmitting station on 100 MHz which covers a large part of the Western Area. The Freetown radio service is relayed by a number of the regional SLBC stations during parts of the day. The regional stations broadcast their own radio services for most of the day. They enjoy a great deal of autonomy from the Freetown headquarters.

Radio broadcasting uses FM exclusively. Previously a shortwave and mediumwave station were located at Goderich. A high power shortwave station also existed at Waterloo, but was mostly leased to international broadcasters. It was destroyed during the civil war. Television is broadcast in analogue on the UHF band.

== History ==
In 1934 the Sierra Leone Broadcasting Service (SLBS) was formed from the Freetown Rediffusion Service making it the earliest English language radio broadcast service in West Africa. Television broadcasts started in April 1963 as a cooperation between the SLBS and commercial interests. The service was initially limited to Freetown on channel 2. Coverage was extended to all districts in 1978 when the service was also upgraded to colour.

Before the country's civil war, SLBS had FM and shortwave transmissions from Freetown. High power mediumwave had been discontinued some time before that. A high power shortwave station was constructed during the 1970s and used for leased transmission of international broadcasters after SLBS could not afford to operate it. Television was broadcast on UHF, having replaced the earlier VHF system.

During the war, the Waterloo shortwave station was completely destroyed and looted. It is not known if it had been broadcasting before this. The rest of the SLBS's facilities fell into disrepair. From 1999 on-wards, the UK's Department For International Development renovated the radio services including the Goderich shortwave station. The Goderich station transmitted for a year before part of the antenna system was destroyed by lightning in June 2002.

The SLBC was formed in April 2010, when the government-owned Sierra Leone Broadcasting Services (SLBS) merged with the United Nations peacekeeping radio station Radio UNAMSIL.

The SLBC was formally inaugurated on June 15, 2010 by Sierra Leone's president Ernest Bai Koroma and United Nations secretary-general Ban Ki-moon. It is under the supervision of the Sierra Leone Ministry of Information and Communications.
