= DRG London =

Digital Audio Broadcasting multiplex

DRG London Greater London 3
- Licensed area: Greater London
- Frequency: 11B (218.640 MHz)
- Air date: 25 February 2002
- Owner: The Digital Radio Group (London) Ltd.
- Website: thedigitalradiogroup.co.uk

DRG London is a Digital Audio Broadcasting multiplex available in the London area that has been broadcasting since January 2002. It is also referred to as the Greater London 3 multiplex. The station operates from ten transmitters: Croydon, Alexandra Palace, Blue Bell Hill, Reigate, Guildford, Brookmans Park, Zouches Farm, BT Bedmont, High Wycombe and Kemsing.

The Kemsing site (2 kW) was replaced in 2010 by the more powerful Wrotham site (5 kW) in Kent.

== Stations available ==
Service	Service ID	Bit rate	Audio channels	Description	Analogue availability
Absolute Classic Rock	C7C9	64 kbit/s	Mono	Classic rock	—
Absolute Radio 60s	C3C4	64 kbit/s	Mono	60s Music	—
Colourful Radio	CEC7	64 kbit/s	Mono	Soul music	—
Desi Radio	C9C1	64 kbit/s	Mono	Panjabi talk and music	1602 kHz (Southall)
Fun Kids	C5C9	80 kbit/s	Mono	Children's radio, on air 0600–1900	—
Gaydio	C9C9	128 kbit/s	Joint stereo	House, dance and pop music; gay-orientated news and entertainment	—
IBC Asia	CAC1	64 kbit/s	Mono	Asian service	—
IBC Tamil	C8C1	64 kbit/s	Mono	Asian service	—
Kismat Radio	C8C0	80 kbit/s	Mono LSF	Asian talk	1035 kHz (London)
Panjab Radio	CF99	64 kbit/s	Mono LSF	Panjabi service	558 kHz (London)
Polish Radio London	C1D0	96 kbit/s	Mono	Polish service	—
Premier Gospel	C9C8	80 kbit/s	Mono	Gospel music, replaced Premier Christian Radio	—
Rainbow Radio	CAC0	64 kbit/s	Mono LSF	African music station	—

== See also ==
- CE London
- Switch London
