= Capital Radio Sierra Leone =

Coordinates: 8°29′33″N 13°17′28″W

Capital Radio
- Sierra Leone
- Frequencies: 104.9, 102.5 and 103.3 MHz

Programming
- Format: Contemporary

History
- First air date: July 2006

Links
- Website: www.capitalradio.sl

Capital Radio is a Sierra Leone radio station based at the Mammy Yoko Business Park in Aberdeen, Freetown.

== History ==
Capital Radio was established as a company in Sierra Leone in 2005. The station has 3 directors - Adonis Abboud, Colin Mason and David Stanley. Test programmes commenced in May 2006 from the Cape Sierra Hotel using the newly installed transmitter at Leicester Peak. The full service started from studios in Wilkinson Road on 3 July 2006. The station fully relocated to the Mammy Yoko Hotel complex in December 2011 and then to Wilberforce in May 2026.

The station transmits from the SLBC Leicester Peak transmitting station using 104.9 MHz. A relay in Bo, Sierra Leone, provides coverage of the city on 102.5 MHz. A relay was launched in Makeni in January 2012 using 103.3 MHz and for Kenema in May 2017 using 104.9 MHz. The station also started streaming its broadcasts in July 2016.

== Current Presenters/DJs ==
- Ishata Bai Kamara (Station Manager)
- Camareh Sarah Kamara
- Alpha Amadu Bah
- Ballie Lamin Kamara
- Nicky Spencer-Coker
- Vanessa Campbell
- Zenobia Jones
- Eric Kawa
- Ida Elizabeth Duncan
- Nathan Sahr Gbamanja
- Christiana Sawyerr

== See also ==
- 2014 Ebola virus epidemic in Sierra Leone (radio programs were used to inform people about the disease)
