= Sunrise Radio Group =

Sunrise Radio Group Limited was a UK radio broadcaster (chairman Avtar Lit), and ran Sunrise Radio. The company also used to own London Media Company Limited. In January 2014, Sunrise Radio Limited, owners of Sunrise Radio 1, Sunrise Radio 3, Time 107.5 and Tristar 96.6, fell into administration, and were acquired for an estimated £2m on 4 February 2014.

== Stations ==
The company owned and managed the following radio stations:

- Sunrise Radio
- Asia Broadcasting Corporation (Sri Lanka) - Hiru fm, Sha fm, Sun fm, Gold fm, Sooriyan fm.

It also owned 33% of Sunrise Radio Yorkshire.

== Former stations ==
- Punjabi Radio
- Yarr Radio
- South London Radio 107.3
- Time 106.8

These ceased broadcasting after they were sold on 22 February 2009, but the new buyer could not afford to run the stations.

The stations that were sold are:

- Time 106.6
- Time 107.5
- Kismat Radio

Sunrise also formerly owned 65% of Radio Plymouth, but this was sold in March 2013.

107.3 Radio Exe was also owned by the group until 2011.

== Controversies ==
The company came under investigation for allegedly delaying passing on £160,000 raised for the Pakistan earthquake in 2005 and the Indian Ocean tsunami in 2004.
