= South London Radio =

Lewisham; England
- Frequency: 107.3 MHz

Programming
- Format: Contemporary

Ownership
- Owner: Sunrise Radio Group

History
- First air date: 8 February 1999
- Last air date: 4 April 2009
- Former names: FLR 107.3 (1999–2000); Fusion 107.3 (2000–2004); Time 107.3 (2004–2007)

South London Radio was an Independent Local Radio station, previously known as FLR 107.3, Fusion 107.3 and Time 107.3, which ceased broadcasting in April 2009.

== Background ==
Despite the geography of South London Radio's coverage area, the station operated out of studios on Basildon Road on the outskirts of Plumstead, sharing its premises with sister station Time 106.8.

South London Radio was, in the final five years of its life, owned by the Sunrise Radio Group.

== Early history ==
The station began life as FLR - 'First Love Radio' - on 8 February 1999, broadcasting from studios in Astra House, New Cross, on the outskirts of Lewisham town centre, backed by the UKRD Group. Their official broadcast area was the London Borough of Lewisham but the signal stretched throughout much of south east London, from the Thames in the north, south west to Camberwell, south to Bromley, and east through Greenwich to Bexley. FLR targeted listeners aged 25 to 54 with a pop music playlist that reflected in particular the contemporary musical interests of the area's black population, including soul, jazz, reggae and club music. Evening specialist shows were led by presenters knowledgeable in funk, gospel and African sounds. The station's slogan was "Hot stuff south of the river".

Figures instrumental in the station's foundation and the winning of its first commercial licence to broadcast were its chairman and noted community worker Sybil Phoenix OBE, founder Stella Headley and director John Shonubi. The first of several Restricted Service Licences were issued in 1992, when the station was broadcast from makeshift studios in Brockley. Guest of honour at the launch was Jeffrey Archer.

UKRD sold their stake in the company to Fusion Radio Holdings in April 2000. The transfer of ownership saw the station adopt a new moniker, Fusion 107.3, on 4 December that year.

Fusion Radio Holdings were purchased by the Milestone Group in April 2003, taking control of the former's similarly named Fusion 107.9 station in Oxford, and adding a second operation to its portfolio of London-based radio stations - the first being Time 106.8, operating from studios in Plumstead.

The sale of Milestone's London assets to the Sunrise Radio Group in February 2004 saw Fusion rebranded as Time 107.3, under the directorship of former Ten-17 FM and Dream 107.7 chief Gary Mulligan, with the intention to temporarily move the operation into office space at the group's existing site in Plumstead, facilitating programming-sharing, which formed a significant part of the two stations' output for several months. Ofcom agreed to this 'co-location arrangement' in March 2006, with the stations continuing to operate from premises outside its own service area, although programme sharing was ended.

== Ofcom Yellow Card ==
On 17 August 2006, industry regulator Ofcom issued Time 107.3 with a 'yellow card', officially recognising that the station was not operating within its format obligations. Following a listener complaint, Ofcom found the station in breach of its music policy - playing a significantly higher percentage of 'current chart hits' than its 33% limit - as well as the accuracy of its 'public file', which carried misleading information as to the amount of automated programming broadcast per day.

Ofcom's report carried the admission from the station's management that outside breakfast, output was automated - indeed, during the latter days of Time's operation, only four hours of daily output were live, and Time's 'public file' was amended accordingly.

Thanks to specialist shows at weekends, the 'yellow card' was lifted at the end of August 2007, after Ofcom concluded that, after further sampling, the station was now operating within its format.

== South London Radio relaunch ==
At 11 am on 20 May 2007, Time 107.3 was relaunched as South London Radio with Tom Hogan playing the first song, George Benson's 'Never Give Up On A Good Thing', and, with the exception of the then-breakfast presenter Jonathan Miles, an entirely new presentation line-up was introduced, with seventeen hours of live output a day.

The station's coverage area was also altered - no longer serving Southwark, and instead, thanks to approved transmitter adjustments, moving westwards to focus on the boroughs of Lewisham, Bromley, Croydon and their conurbations.

== Performance and subsequent closure ==
Much like sister station Time 106.8, South London Radio struggled badly to deliver large audiences in a cut-throat London radio market. Despite an adjustment in the survey area to incorporate the boroughs of Bromley and Croydon in late 2007, RAJAR figures were largely unaffected: in its final listening survey at the end of 2008, the station reached 19,000 listeners a week, representing a 0.4% audience share.

In an unusual move, the Sunrise Radio Group put the station up for sale via a message on its website in mid-October 2008, and following disputed claims that a buyer had been found, South London Radio ceased broadcasting at midnight on Saturday 4 April 2009.
