= Sunrise Radio =

Asian radio station in the United Kingdom

Coordinates: 51°30′19″N 0°22′31″W

- United Kingdom
- Broadcast area: Greater London on AM; United Kingdom on DAB
- Frequencies: MW: 963 kHz and 972 kHz; DAB: 11A (Sound Digital)

Programming
- Format: Asian Music, Entertainment & News

Ownership
- Owner: Sunrise Radio London Limited
- Sister stations: Sunrise Hits; Sunrise Retro

History
- First air date: 5 November 1989 (34 years ago)
- Former frequencies: 1413 kHz; 1458 kHz

Links
- Website: www.sunriseradio.com

Sunrise Radio is a British Asian commercial radio station based in Hounslow, London. It broadcasts Asian music, entertainment and news from the Indian subcontinent to Greater London on 963 and 972 AM, nationally on DAB+, and online.

According to RAJAR, Sunrise Radio National's weekly audience stands at 333,000 listeners (Q3/26). Sunrise Radio was overtaken in London by its closet rival for the first time ever in Q3/26 data. Its reach in London now stands at 154,000.

== History ==
Sunrise Radio started life as the pirate radio station Sina Radio, originally founded in Southall in 1984 by Avtar Lit and Harjinder Kaur who were also the key presenters alongside the adored Manjit Singh Gehdu and Asif Ghazali. The first studio was based on The Cresent Road in Southall, Middlesex from 1984 until 1988.

Sina Radio Studios (circa 1988), The Crescent, Southall UB1 1BE

In 1989, owned by Avtar Lit, it was awarded a license and officially launched on 5 November 1989, becoming the first 24-hour radio station in the UK specifically for the Asian demographic. It initially broadcast to West London on 1413 AM. In 1994, it took over the BBC's former 1458 kHz frequency which had been used for GLR.

In 1992, the station acquired Sunrise House in Southall which was officially opened on 21 January 1993, by Peter Baldwin Chief Executive of the Radio Authority. In 2016, Sunrise Radio Moved to a new purpose built studio and office in Hounslow, which also serves as the company's Headquarters.

The station expanded by also broadcasting on satellite television, first on the Astra analogue satellite, and later on Sky Digital.

From 1991 through until August 2004, the Sunrise Radio satellite feed was the source of the live hourly IRN news bulletins for numerous UK commercial, community and hospital radio stations.

In July 2013, Lit was one of forty radio professionals honoured by the Radio Centre for their significant contribution to the growth and success of the industry.

On 13 January 2014, the station would go into administration. The station was bought by the mobile operator Lyca, and was able to retain its license, with a move to 963/972 AM. Tony Lit was appointed managing director, with Gurdev Jassi as chairman.

In November 2014, the Sunrise Radio Training Academy was launched - a free training scheme for those wanting to pursue a career in radio. The scheme allows those wishing to pursue a career in radio to train alongside professionals and learn every aspect of the business, from producing to presenting and radio journalism.

Sunrise Radio went Nationwide on DAB in early 2016.

== Events ==
Sunrise Radio has organised and sponsored many events and melas, including a collaboration with the Mayor of London's office to put together the London Mela, launched in August 2003 in Gunnersbury Park, West London. The event attracted an audience of over 60,000.

In 2004 Sunrise Radio launched the Asian Lifestyle Show at London's Olympia attracting over 40,000 people. The event was widely recognised as the largest celebration of Asian culture in Europe. The show was shortlisted for the 'Best New Consumer Show 2004' by the Association of Event Organisers. The Asian Lifestyle Show 2004-2007 was consistently sold out.

Sunrise Radio has collaborated with University College London (UCL) and Imperial College to support their West End production, Rangeela.

== Subsidiary stations ==
On 8 May 2023, Sunrise Radio launched Sunrise Smooth, a station playing easy listening Asian music. Sunrise Smooth was launched on DAB in London, but Sunrise Radio confirmed it had plans to launch the station on other DAB platforms in the UK.

On 5 November 2025, Sunrise Smooth was replaced by two new stations: Sunrise Hits, playing melodic contemporary Asian music, launched nationally on Sound Digital in space freed up by the conversion of the principal Sunrise Radio service to DAB+; and Sunrise Retro, playing older-leaning Asian pop, which took the place of Sunrise Smooth in London. Sunrise Hits downsized from national to London DAB only in November 2026.

== Recognition ==
Sunrise Radio has won the 'Radio Station of the Year' award at the Asian Media Awards in 2016, 2017 2019, 2021, 2023, and 2025. It has won 'Asian Radio Station of the Year' at the British Asian Media Awards in 2020, and 2025. In 2024, it won the 'Media of the Year' award at Economic Policy Group's 16th Annual Political & Public Life Awards at the House of Commons. It won the NTL Commercial Radio Award for Marketing Excellence in 2004.

Farah Ahmed (Bollywood Top 20) was named the 'Best Media Personality' by the Pakistani Achievement Awards 2014.

== See also ==
- List of radio stations in the United Kingdom
