= Kismat Radio =

Coordinates: 51.5049°N 0.3746°W

London; England
- Broadcast area: Greater London
- Frequency: 1035 kHz

Programming
- Format: Asian talk

Ownership
- Owner: Sunrise Radio Group

Kismat Radio was a radio station broadcasting from the Crystal Palace Transmitter in south-east London.

== Background ==
Kismat Radio was part of the Sunrise Radio Group, aimed at an audience of British Asians and South Asian expats aged 30+. Programme formats comprised Asian Talk and music.

The station could be heard on 1035 AM in London, DAB Digital Radio across Bradford and Huddersfield, Sky channel 0173, and also broadcast a live web stream from its website.

The station was removed from Sky on 20 March 2013, having gone silent the previous day. The station continued broadcasting on AM and the website, but closed in early 2014 or before.

The 1035 AM band was taken over by DilSe radio.
