= Plymouth Gold =

Radio station in Devon, England

Plymouth Gold (formerly Classic Gold 1152) was an Independent Local Radio station broadcasting to the city of Plymouth in Devon and surrounding areas. It was owned by GCap Media and was part of the national Classic Gold Digital Network. It broadcast on 1152 kHz AM, DAB digital radio, as well as online and on Sky Digital Channel 0189 (the latter two were the national versions of Classic Gold, lacking the local elements). Based at Earl's Acre, Plymouth, its sister station was Heart Plymouth, formerly known as Plymouth Sound until 2009.

== History ==
Plymouth Gold was launched on 19 May 1975, as Plymouth Sound, broadcasting on 97.0 FM and 261 metres medium wave (1152 AM). It was one of the earliest ILRs to launch in the UK and was the first commercial radio station for the West Country.

Towards the end of the 1980s/ early 1990s, as with most other ILRs Plymouth Sound split into two stations; the FM frequency remained as Plymouth Sound and the AM service became Plymouth Sound AM. After being owned (either fully or partly) by the GWR Group, the Capital Group and The Local Radio Company, throughout the 1990s, the station was fully bought by the GWR Group around 2000. On 7 February 2000 Plymouth Sound AM was re-branded Classic Gold 1152 (Plymouth). Due to ownership rules the GWR Group had to sell off all of their Classic Gold stations. They were sold to the UBC Media Group, although the GWR Group did keep a 20% stake in the brand. The 20% stake was increased to 100% in 2007 and GCap assumed full control of both Capital Gold and the Classic Gold Digital Network, merging the two networks, and renaming it simply Gold on 3 August.

== Later years ==
Plymouth Gold formerly had around 20 hours a day of networked programming. Only the weekday drivetime show was local. Network shows still had local adverts, information and news aired at selected intervals. The station mostly played music from the 1960s, 1970s and 1980s. According to the RAJAR results for the period ending December 2006, the station had a total of 6,000 listeners and a 1.1% market share.

== Network programmes under Classic Gold ==
- The Even Tastier Breakfast
- The Graham Rogers Morning Show
- Classic Gold Drivetime (local programme)
- Paul Baker's Evening Show
- Classic Gold Late Night
- The Retro Countdown
- Classic Gold Albums

== Notable Network presenters ==
- Tony Blackburn
- Paul Burnett
- Gary Crowley
- Trevor Dann
- Chris Hawkins
- Graham Rogers
- Sandy Warr

== Past network presenters ==
- Simon Bates
- David Hamilton
- Noddy Holder
- Dave Lee Travis
- Mike Read
- Emperor Rosko
- Jimmy Savile
- Johnnie Walker
