= Classic Gold 1332 =

UK Independent Local Radio station

Coordinates: 52.5746°N 0.24718°W

Classic Gold 1332 was an Independent Local Radio station broadcasting to the Peterborough area on 1332 kHz AM and DAB digital radio. It also was available around Cambridge on DAB digital radio. It was part of the Classic Gold Digital Network which was owned by GCap and was the sister station of 102.7 Hereward FM. Its studios were based in the Queensgate Centre, Peterborough.

== History ==
The station was launched on 10 July 1980, as Hereward Radio, broadcasting on 102.7 FM and 1332 AM. On 14 April 1992 the station split its AM and FM frequencies, with 102.7 Hereward FM broadcasting on 102.7 FM and The Worlds Greatest Music Station or WGMS launching on 1332 AM. WGMS was short-lived, as around 1994, it was bought by the GWR Group and re-branded as Classic Gold 1332. Owing to going over the limit of the number of stations a group can own, the GWR Group had to sell all of their "Classic Gold" stations. They were purchased by the UBC Media Group, although GWR did keep a 20% stake in the brand of stations.

== Format ==
Classic Gold 1332 played the best songs from the 1960s to the present day, with a larger focus on the 1960s to the 1980s. It was networked for 20 hours a day during the week, with the single local show presented by Pete Revell. Network shows had local elements broadcast at selected intervals. According to the RAJAR results for the period ending December 2006, the station had 36,000 listeners and a 2.9% market share in its area.

On 3 August 2007, all Classic Gold stations were rebranded as simply Gold. This followed the GCap Media's purchase of the Classic Gold network, and the merging of the merger between the Capital Gold and Classic Gold networks.

== Network programmes ==
- The Even Tastier Breakfast
- The Graham Rogers Morning Show
- Classic Gold Drivetime (local programme)
- Paul Baker's Evening Show
- Classic Gold Late Night
- The Retro Countdown
- Classic Gold Albums

== Network presenters ==
- Paul Baker
- Tony Blackburn
- Paul Burnett
- Matthew Hardy
- Erika North
- Gary Crowley
- Graham Rogers
- Sandy Warr
- Trevor Dann
- Mark Dennison
- Chris Hawkins

== Past network presenters ==
- Jimmy Savile
- Dave Lee Travis
- Johnnie Walker
- Mike Read
- Noddy Holder
- David Hamilton
- Simon Bates
- Emperor Rosko
- Darth Vader
