= Heart Berkshire =

Coordinates: 51.4422°N 1.0372°W

Reading; England
- Broadcast area: Berkshire and north Hampshire
- Frequencies: FM: 97.0, (Reading); 102.9 (Basingstoke and West Berkshire); 103.4 (Henley-on-Thames) MHz; DAB: 12D (Reading and Basingstoke)
- RDS: HEART
- Branding: Heart

Programming
- Format: Hot AC

History
- First air date: 8 March 1976
- Last air date: 9 July 2010
- Former names: Radio 210 (1976–1988); 210-FM (1988–1994); 2-Ten FM (1994–2009)
- Former frequencies: 1431 MW

Heart Berkshire (formerly 2-Ten FM) was an Independent Local Radio station, serving Berkshire and North Hampshire from studios in Reading.

== About ==
Launched as Radio 210 (Two-One-Oh), the station commenced broadcasting in March 1976 on its medium-wave frequency of 210 metres (1,431 kHz). It later became known as 210-FM, later as 2-Ten FM, and was part of The One Network group of stations owned and operated by Global Radio by 2008. The station was rebranded a year later as part of the Heart Network.

== History ==
The original parent company, Radio Kennet had won the licence to broadcast as far back as 1974, but plans for the station to float on the London Stock Exchange as soon as it commenced broadcasting failed as it did not raise enough funding. Radio Kennet returned in 1976 as Thames Valley Broadcasting.

Radio 210 first broadcast on 8 March 1976 at 6 a.m. Former BBC Radio 2 DJ Paul Hollingdale played the Carpenters record "We've Only Just Begun" at the start of his four-hour breakfast show. Other early presenters were Steve Wright, Mike Read, Tony Fox, Steve Crozier ("Yer Man Croze"), Howard Pearce, Mike Matthews, John Flower, Tony Holden, Steve Wood, Phil Coope, Chris Hall, Chris Kelly, Mike Quinn, Dave Glass, John Hayes (deceased), Gavin McCoy, Bob Morrison, Graham Ledger, Mike Sanderson (the Folk Show), Martin Dean (the Soul Show) and news editor David Addis. Rising stars Mike Read and Steve Wright co-hosted the Read & Wright Show at weekends before gaining daily shows and later pursuing high-profile careers on BBC Radio 1. Howard Pearce also followed Read & Wright's route to the national networks, first to Radio Luxembourg and later the BBC. Other presenters made the opposite move, leaving the BBC to join Radio 210, including Bob Harris and David Hamilton, the latter having defected from BBC Radio 2 because of changes in that station's music policy.

Radio 210 initially only served Reading with a transmitter on 97.0 MHz FM on top of The Butts shopping centre; however that changed when it began broadcasting from the Hannington transmitter on a second frequency of 102.9 MHz at midday 1 January 1987 to serve a wider area of Berkshire and north Hampshire, with a Henley-on-Thames relay added in 1997. Classic Gold gained a new AM transmitter in 1996 on 1485kHz, broadcasting to West Berkshire and North Hampshire from a site in Newbury.

== Split frequencies ==
In 1990, Radio 210 split frequencies (as required then to do so by Government due to a radio act recently passed to end simulcasting) to provide two services – 210-FM (Now broadcasting as Heart South) and 210 Classic Gold Radio. The AM transmitter was actually a relay of Brunel Classic Gold's service from Bristol. Also, broadcast to Bournemouth, Devon, & Swindon. It took a couple of networked shows. One Sunday Lunchtime show with David Hamilton, and also Jimmy Savile's Saviles Travels (1990–92). It stopped taking that because it was said that they preferred to broadcast their own shows. Classic Gold featured slightly more known presenters like Tony Gillham (head of music), and Trevor Fry. Paul Burnett joined in 1996, and Tony Blackburn a few years later. They were both dropped in July 2007, when Classic Gold was taken over by GCap Media, and became known as Gold.

Radio 210 claimed to be "the only comprehensive travel service in the Thames Valley and North Hampshire". The station broadcast news bulletins on the hour every hour and regional news during certain points throughout the day.

== Network restructuring ==
On 21 June 2010, Global Radio announced plans to merge Heart Berkshire with Heart Oxfordshire as part of plans to reduce the Heart network of stations from 33 to 15. The new station, Heart Thames Valley began broadcasting from Reading on 9 July 2010.
