= Mid-Anglia Radio =

British radio network

Mid-Anglia Radio PLC, was a company that owned radio stations in the Norfolk and Cambridgeshire regions of the UK.

The stations they owned were:

- Hereward Radio, in Peterborough (and, briefly, in Northampton as well).
- Worlds Greatest Music Station (or WGMS 1332) – in Peterborough.
- CN-FM 103, in Cambridge.
- KL.FM 96.7, in Kings Lynn, Norfolk, sold to Bauer Media.

== History ==
In March/April 1994 Mid-Anglia Radio PLC was sold to Swindon based GWR Group, (now Global Radio) for £3.5M. It was said that Mid-Anglia Radio had made a loss of £12,186 for the year ending 30 September 1993.

After the GWR Group bought the Mid-Anglia Radio group of stations, a couple of stations were renamed. WGMS became Classic Gold 1332, and CN-FM 103 became Q103.

In 1997, KL.FM was sold to Dawe Media, moving from there into the UKRD Group in 1999 and via that group to Bauer in 2019: since September 2020 the station has been part of the Greatest Hits Radio network.

Classic Gold 1332 became part of the Gold network in 2007 and Smooth Radio in 2014, reverting to Gold in 2019 when Connect FM was absorbed into Smooth East Midlands. All programming is now fed from London, with localised news and advertising.

Global retained ownership of Hereward Radio and Q103; in 2009 the stations were rebranded as Heart services, and as of 2019 these transmit as part of Heart East with a regional afternoon programme (from Milton Keynes), network programming at other times, and localised news and advertising for each licensed area.
