= Suffolk Group Radio =

Suffolk Group Radio was the parent company for two Independent Local Radio stations serving the county of Suffolk in England.

== The Stations ==
Radio Orwell began transmissions from Electric House, Ipswich on 28 October 1975. It was one of the original group of ILR stations set up by the Independent Broadcasting Authority following a relaxation of the rules governing broadcasting in Britain. Other stations that were included in the original 19 were LBC, Capital Radio and BRMB.

The western side of Suffolk got its own radio station in the form of Saxon Radio, which began broadcasting in Bury St Edmunds on 6 November 1982.

== Programmes ==
The two stations operated with separate breakfast shows and other programmes were networked from either site to both transmitters. Most of the programmes came from the Electric House studios in Ipswich and a few came from Bury St Edmunds' Long Brackland studios.

In 1984-85, the stations experimented with a drive-time news and current affairs programme ("The Home Run") which had presenters in both studios - Allan Lee in Ipswich and Adrienne Rosen in Bury. This proved too expensive to continue for long and the programme was cut back to one presenter in the Ipswich studio.

== Take overs ==
In 1990, Norwich-based station Radio Broadland took over Orwell and Saxon and to reflect the addition of these new stations, the company became East Anglian Radio. The new group re-launched Orwell and Saxon as one station under the name of SGR FM in 1992 and the following year, the station moved from its original studios in the centre of Ipswich to a brand new base on the outskirts of the town. The studio and offices in Bury St Edmunds were then closed.

EAR also launched a sister station to SGR in 1993 named SGR Colchester after successfully applying for the broadcast licence. The Ipswich station provided programmes which were shared during offpeak times with SGR Colchester.

In 1995, the decision was made by East Anglian Radio to make better use of its AM frequencies and Amber Radio was created to play 60s and 70s music from its studios in Ipswich and also Norwich. Amber operated on the AM transmitters previously used by the SGR stations to simulcast.

Then in 1996, the East Anglian Radio was bought by the GWR Group, which later became GCap Media and then Global Radio.
