= The Worlds Greatest Music Station =

Radio station in England

The Worlds Greatest Music Station (or WGMS) was the AM sister station to Hereward FM. Its time on-air was short lived and restricted to approximately two years when both local ILR stations were acquired by the GWR group in the 1990s.

== History ==
Originally, Hereward Radio (which launched on 10 July 1980) broadcast on both on FM and 1332 AM. On 14 April 1992 the station split its AM and FM frequencies, with Hereward FM just broadcasting on 102.7 FM and The Worlds Greatest Music Station launching on 1332 AM. WGMS was short-lived, as around 1994, it was purchased by the GWR Group and then re-branded as Classic Gold 1332. Owing to going over the limits of the number of stations a group can own, GWR sold their "Classic Gold" stations, and they were bought by UBC Media, although GWR did keep a 20% stake. Then, on 3 August 2007, all Classic Gold stations were rebranded as simply "Gold". This followed the GCap Media purchase of the Classic Gold network, and the merging of the Capital Gold and Classic Gold stations.
