= Nicola Bonn =

British podcaster and former radio presenter

Nicola Bonn (born 1980/1981) is a British podcaster and former radio presenter.

== Background ==
Bonn studied at the University of Bristol, where she gained a Bachelor of Arts with honours in 2003.

== Career ==
Bonn's career in radio lasted 15 years. As of 2006, Bonn was a presenter at Capital Life, a DAB radio station broadcasting across the UK. In the same year, she joined Classic FM to present on weekend mornings; prior to working at Classic FM, she had worked at Severn Sound in Gloucestershire and at Core radio, a national digital radio station, in addition to presenting on Capital Life. As of 2006, the Sunday morning edition of her show began at 4am.

As of 2011, Bonn was presenting the weekday early breakfast show on the Heart radio network.

In 2013, she became a beauty columnist for a range of UK magazines, whilst continuing to present on Heart Radio. In the latter half of 2013, Bonn moved to Smooth Radio, another music-based commercial radio station, to present the early breakfast show on weekdays.

By 2018, Bonn had become a contributor to This Morning on ITV, specialising in beauty. In late 2018, Bonn left the weekday early breakfast show on Smooth Radio. She left Smooth Radio to concentrate full-time on the podcast the Outspoken Beauty Podcast which she was also hosting.

In early 2019, Bonn became the beauty editor of Heart Radio and the Heart Radio website.

Bonn currently presents the Outspoken Beauty Podcast, which releases three episodes per week, with some episodes lasting almost an hour and others being a few minutes in length.

In a 2024 interview, Bonn discussed, amongst other things, her battle with mental health problems and her experience of her own appearance.

== Personal life ==
As of 2019, Bonn had a husband and two children, and lived in London.
