= Capital Life =

British digital radio station

- London; United Kingdom
- Frequency: DAB: 11D (Digital One)

Programming
- Format: Pop

Ownership
- Owner: GCap Media
- Sister stations: 95.8 Capital FM

History
- First air date: 15 November 1999
- Last air date: 31 March 2009
- Former names: Life

Links
- Website: listentolife.com

Capital Life, also known as Life, was a digital radio station broadcasting across the UK on the Digital One network and streamed online. Capital Life was due to be available on DTV but never launched due to the station's closure.

== About ==
Capital Life was owned by GCap Media, having been launched by Capital Radio PLC before the company merged with GWR Group PLC. In 1999, it was one of the first DAB Digital Radio stations to launch on the Digital One multiplex in the UK.

To start, the station had two presenters. It was based in a news studio used by Capital Gold London outside of breakfast hours. Later, it moved into a newly created Digital Broadcast studio in Leicester Square, which it shared with Capital Disney and Century London.

Until 2005, Paul Phear Magic 105.4 presented the breakfast show on weekday mornings, culminating in "The Life Top Ten At Ten" - a chart from years gone by - any year from 1975 onwards - the chart was, in fact, not actual historic chart positions but the order chosen by the programme controller to avoid playing certain novelty songs and those that did not reflect the musical style. After the Life Top Ten At Ten, the station was automated all day - news from IRN hourly, but music at all other times. Paul Phear then returned to present a late-night love song show from 10 pm. For a short spell, Jon O'Neill presented in the drivetime slot. On Saturday morning, Phillip Chryssikos presented a show. Sunday, it was non-stop music.

After a successful year presenting 'The Life Coach,' a quirky weekend breakfast show, comedian Anthony Davis replaced Paul Phear, hosting the weekday breakfast show live, instead of pre-recording, a rare event for a Digital radio station, making Capital Life one of the very few digital radio stations to have live presentation. (Along with sister station Capital Disney, which mainly provided live programming).

Unlike other radio stations, there were no travel bulletins (due to the limited number of DAB Radios in households at the time and the fact that the station provided blanket national coverage), commercials, interviews with celebrities and politicians, or sports reports - the emphasis was on music, and there was a playlist similar to that of Century Digital.

== Relaunch and demise ==
'Life' relaunched as Capital Life in 2005, under Programme Controller Micky Gavin (who left very shortly afterwards to run Hereward FM) and Digital Content Director Kevin Palmer, and a full presenter line-up joined the station, along with a new sung jingle package from Reelworld. These presenters (with subsequent positions/station) included: Susan Spence (now LBC 97.3 & BBC Radio 5 Live), Nicola Bonn (Classic FM and Heart Network), Ali Wheeler (Invicta FM), Leigh Jones (Red Dragon), Tom Rudolph, Brian O'Neill (GMTV), Pam Sharpless, Micky Gavin (Real Radio Scotland), Jonathan Miles (BBC Radio Newcastle) Ali Jones (Fox FM) and Anthony Davis (LBC 97.3 and Jazz FM)

Upon the merger of Capital Radio PLC and GWR Group PLC, 'Capital Life' was mooted to become the Digital alternative to BBC Radio 2 and preparations were made for Capital Gold and Capital Life to be merged into one 'super station'. Later, these plans were quietly abandoned by GCap Media, and Capital Gold rebranded to 'Gold'.

In its final two years, Life had no presenters. Quietly, the weekend presenters were dropped, followed by all weekday programming aside from the live breakfast show. This was later dropped, and the station broadcast non-stop music with news bulletins every hour for the remainder of its life. The only other non-music items heard were promotions for GCap Media products such as CD releases associated with its other radio stations, Classic FM and theJazz, and an afternoon 'showbiz' report produced internally by the GCap News team.

== Closure ==
On 11 January 2008, newly appointed GCap Chief Executive Fru Hazlitt announced a package of measures to save GCap Media from being taken over and prevent the company from slipping further into the red due to bad trading conditions within the radio industry. Under Fru Hazlitt, GCap announced a complete retreat from DAB Digital Radio. (A bold move, after the Ralph Bernard years in charge of the company, who had been a big supporter of Digital Radio, both while in charge of GWR Group PLC and GCap Media). It had already been announced in 2007 that Life and sister station Core were to close, with all investment in them ceasing. Only now had there been any announcement that TheJazz was to close and that Planet Rock would be sold. Life continued to broadcast with continuous music until 31 March, when it went off air at just after 11 pm, along with theJazz.
