= The Breeze (radio station) =

The Breeze was the name of two easy listening radio stations in Essex and Surrey. The stations are today part of the Gold network.

== History ==
=== Breeze Essex ===
Starting life as the medium wave frequencies of Essex Radio, the frequencies split in July 1989, when Breeze AM was born. It later changed name to simply Breeze, then The Breeze. In 2000, the GWR Group bought Essex Radio and Breeze became Classic Gold Breeze despite petitioning by locals. The word Breeze was later dropped as it became part of the Classic Gold Digital network.

=== Breeze Surrey ===
Breeze 1521 was formerly known as Fame 1521, Mercury Xtra and Extra AM. It came about when Radio Mercury split its AM and FM frequencies to form two services. Just like its sister station in Essex it became Classic Gold Breeze then it became part of the Classic Gold Digital network.

== Today ==
Since August 2007 after another take over by Global Radio, both services have become Gold and offer very few local programmes. At present Breeze AM is an online station with a music policy of love songs and easy listening.
