= GWR FM =

Regional radio network in England

- England
- Broadcast area: Bristol, Bath, and Wiltshire
- Frequencies: 96.3 (Bristol Yate, Nailsea, Keynsham, Portishead Thornbury), 103.0 (Weston-super-Mare and Bath); 97.2 (Swindon); 102.2 (Chippenham Corsham, Melksham, Trowbridge, Calne)

Programming
- Format: Hot adult contemporary

Ownership
- Owner: GWR FM Group, later a part of GCap Media

GWR FM was a network of three radio stations in the south west of England broadcasting to Bristol, Bath, Wiltshire and surrounding areas. All three stations were rebranded and joined the Heart Network on 23 March 2009.

The stations in the network were:

- GWR FM Bristol, which was launched in 1981 as Radio West. It relaunched as GWR in 1985
- GWR FM Bath, first broadcast as GWR Radio Bath in 1987, becoming the third station in the network and sharing some programming with the Bristol station
- GWR FM Wiltshire, which launched in 1982 as Wiltshire Radio. In 1985, Wiltshire Radio relaunched as GWR, to coincide with the re-launch of the Bristol station

== History ==
The GWR Radio brand started life in 1985 when Swindon-based Wiltshire Radio joined with Bristol's Radio West.

== The Mix Network ==
In 1992 a re-launch of the station saw The New GWR-FM become the hub of what was The Mix Network, a network of radio stations owned by the GWR Group (later GCap Media ) covering southern England and Wales. The radio station created a tightly formatted sound where popular Top 40 chart hits were blended with older hits. This led to its "Better Music Mix" format which was then utilised on other radio stations within the GWR Group, including Essex FM, Trent FM and Beacon Radio, creating a mini national network.

Each station within the Mix Network played a centrally produced playlist. Songs were broadcast almost at the same time as neighbouring group stations and each station adopted the "Better Music Mix" tagline which was announced by local presenters in between the music. Following the introduction of the Mix Network some programming, such as Late Night Love and The Request Fest, was syndicated across the whole network from the GWR Bristol studios.

== Notable presenters ==
- Scott Mills
- Ralph Bernard
- Dave Barrett
- Keith Francis (Gooden)
- Sandy Martin
- Charlie Wolf
- Graham Torrington
- Johnnie Walker
- Andy Henley
