= Paul Phear =

British radio presenter

Paul Phear is a British radio presenter, who presents on weekday afternoons and Saturday evenings across the UK on Smooth Radio.

== Career ==
In the 1980s, Phear worked as the afternoon presenter at Bristol's Radio West, presenting the show between 1:15pm and 4:00pm in 1983 with a radio market taking place 15 minutes into the show, before moving to present a networked show on the GWR network. He also presented the Top 40 show on Radio West on Saturdays in the 1980s. Phear then moved to presenting the breakfast show on Chiltern Radio from 1988 to 1990, as well as hosting on The Superstation - a radio service that provided overnight programmes for independent local radio stations across the UK.

Phear joined 95.8 Capital FM in 1991 and in 1994 he was presenting Saturday breakfast on the station. As of 1996, he was presenting the breakfast show every Thursday between 6am and 10am on the station. Before leaving the station to work at Capital Life, Phear presented early mornings on the station.

At Capital Life, a commercial radio station broadcasting across the UK on digital radio, Phear presented the breakfast show. Phear presented the breakfast show until 2005, and the last part of his show was an exploration of the music of a particular year from the past few decades.

Phear presented the afternoon show on Magic Radio until 2014, when he left to present the afternoon show on Smooth Radio. He still presents the same show on Smooth Radio, as well as presenting The Smooth Sanctuary, a show featuring particularly downbeat and relaxing pop music pieces from the last seven decades, on Saturday evenings (The Smooth Sanctuary is presented on the other days of the week by either Gary Vincent or Darren Parks). He began presenting The Smooth Sanctuary on Saturday evenings in 2021. The Smooth Sanctuary's Saturday edition is currently broadcast between 7pm and 10pm.

In the radio audience listening figures from RAJAR covering July to September 2023 inclusive, Phear's afternoon show on Smooth Radio had a market share of 4.2%.
