= KL.FM 96.7 =

Former radio station in King's Lynn, Norfolk, England

- King's Lynn; England
- Broadcast area: West Norfolk
- Frequency: 96.7 FM
- RDS: KLFM96.7

Programming
- Language: English
- Format: Hot adult contemporary

Ownership
- Owner: Bauer Radio

History
- First air date: 1 July 1992
- Last air date: 31 August 2020

Technical information
- Transmitter coordinates: 52.7742°N 0.6498°E

Links
- Website: KLFM 96.7

KL.FM 96.7 (King's Lynn FM) was an Independent Local Radio station located in King's Lynn, Norfolk, England. It broadcast from a former bank building at 18 Blackfriars Street in King's Lynn on 96.7 FM, the frequency previously used by BBC Radio Norfolk. The station was closed as part of a merger of dozens of local stations owned by Bauer into its national Greatest Hits Radio brand.

== History ==
=== Licence application ===
In 1987, Mid-Anglia Radio Limited identified King's Lynn and West Norfolk as an area poorly served by the broadcast media. An application to the Independent Broadcasting Authority for a relay transmitter to serve this area was rejected. Discussions were then opened with the West Norfolk MP, Henry Bellingham, who wrote to the Home Office and the IBA supporting the concept of a station serving the area.

On 4 October 1990, the IBA announced that King's Lynn was one of the areas to be advertised in the first phase of local radio licences by the new Radio Authority, who assumed responsibility for licensing and regulating commercial radio in the UK on 1 January 1991.

On 4 June 1991, the licence was formally advertised. Potential applicants had until 24 September to return their proposals. On 25 September, it was announced that three applicants had applied for the licence: King's Lynn FM (Mid-Anglia Radio PLC), X-Cel FM (X-Cel FM LTD) and one other.

In December 1991, it was announced that Mid-Anglia Radio PLC (trading as King's Lynn FM) had won an eight-year licence to provide the area with its own independent local commercial radio station, known initially as "King's Lynn Radio" before adopting the KL.FM moniker. Two weeks of test transmissions began on 16 June 1992. Two kilowatts of power was originally used to broadcast from a transmitter at the Great Massingham transmission site; this was later increased to three kilowatts.

=== Equipment ===
Studio equipment originally included DAT players, a computer playout system for jingles and commercials, Technics CD players and an Audionics mixing desk. The original audio processor was an Inovonics FM 250 model. In the Summer of 2004 the old studio equipment was removed and new equipment and furniture installed. This included a Sonifex Sovereign mixing desk and a new digital playout system (RCS Master Control).

=== Management ===
Stewart Francis was the first managing director of the station, with Peter Kingham holding the post of Station Manager and Dave King was Programme Controller. Other people on the board of directors were Martin George (chairman), Dr Mary Archer MA, David Ball, Jean Barker OBE, David Cocks, Tony Durham MA, William Gibbs, Harry Giltrap, Patrick Sharman & Richard Winfrey.

After Mid-Anglia Radio PLC was sold to the GWR Group in 1994 KLFM's on-air name was changed to "Greatest Hits 96.7, The New KLFM". This "new" service played more music and had less chat.

In late 1996, displeased with the new format, Dave King and a number of other presenters left the station and set up a 28-day restricted service licence trial service. They called the station "King's Lynn Radio 105.4" and the station's tag line was "All that local radio should be".

In March 1997, GWR sold a number of local commercial stations, including KL.FM, as part of a planned disposal programme following the acquisition of Classic FM. Dawe Media of Cambridge bought KL.FM for £1.1 million; Stewart Francis once again became involved with the station by becoming the new chairman. It was while Dawe Media owned the station that some equipment changes were made, including the installation of a computerised playout system (the Enco DAD).

In December 1999, Dawe Media sold KL.FM to the UKRD Group. That company, in turn, was acquired in 2019 by Bauer Radio, alongside Lincs FM Group, Celador Radio & Wireless Group's Local Radio Stations.

=== Replacement with Greatest Hits Radio ===
On 27 May 2020, KL.FM's owners Bauer Media announced that the station, alongside the other local stations in its portfolio, would be replaced by Greatest Hits Radio East on 1 September 2020. Key presenter Simon Rowe, who had worked at KL.FM for 23 years, went on to head up a new local independent station on DAB, Radio West Norfolk, launched on 20 November 2020.

== Programming ==
All programming was produced and presented locally. Until 2018, KL.FM had broadcast The Vodafone Big Top 40 chart show (previously The Pepsi Chart & Hit40UK) which was produced from Capital FM in London and syndicated across over 140 commercial radio stations in the UK. However, the show was withdrawn from syndication and now broadcasts solely on Heart and Capital stations.

== Branding ==
On-air imaging came from mainly Century 21 and JAM Creative Productions. The original jingles (July 1992-September 1993) were re-sings of Century 21's 'Madison Avenue' package. Between September 1993 and August 1994 the station used TM Century re-sings of a WPLJ package. The 1997-2002 jingle package was a re-sing of Jams 'Ultimate One' package (originally created for BBC Radio 1). A recent package (the '...And Now' package) was originally produced by JAM for KIMN in Denver, Colorado and re-sung for KL.FM 96.7, although these were never used on air by KL.FM.

By the end of the station's life, most of KL.FM's on air branding (jingles, promotions, etc.) was produced in-house at UKRD's production department in Bristol, but the station had re-sings of the 'Star Radio' package from Reelworld.

== Sources ==
- KL.FM 96.7 staff
- IBA, Radio Authority & OFCOM
- Eastern Daily Press
- Lynn News
- Hospital Radio Lynn
- Norfolk County Library Services
- KL.FM Licence Application (dated: 19 September 1991)
- KL.FM & UKRD Websites
- radiorewind.co.uk
- Sound recordings
- Guinness World Records Ltd.
