= Heart 103.3 =

Coordinates: 52.0298°N 0.7999°W

Heart Milton Keynes

Milton Keynes; England
- Broadcast area: North Buckinghamshire
- Frequency: 103.3 MHz
- RDS: HEART_MK

Programming
- Format: Hot AC

History
- First air date: 15 October 1989
- Last air date: 16 July 2010
- Former names: Horizon Radio (1989–2009)

Heart Milton Keynes (formerly Horizon Radio) was an Independent Local Radio station for Milton Keynes and North Buckinghamshire. Broadcasting on 103.3FM from the Bow Brickhill transmitter, the station was part of Global Radio's Heart Network. The station's flagship shows were Heart Breakfast with Wes Venn and Heart Drivetime with Lucy Ellis.

== History ==
The station was launched as Horizon Radio by Chris Pearson in October 1989 as sister station to neighbouring Chiltern Radio and part of The Chiltern Radio Network. It was subsequently rebranded as 'Horizon Radio, The Hotter Mix' in 1992. The first song played was "The Only Way Is Up" by Yazz and the Plastic Population.

The station was later re-branded as FM 103 Horizon in 1995, following the purchase of the Chiltern Radio Network by the GWR Group, before changing back to Horizon Radio in 2006 and finally, Heart in January 2009. The name, Horizon Radio, had no real significance other than being an idea created when the station launched, due to the aerial view and 'horizon' seen from the transmitter location in Bow Brickhill, on the southeastern boundary of MK .

== Sports coverage ==
During the 2008-09 football season, the station's predecessor Horizon Radio secured a deal with the MK Dons football club to broadcast live match commentary for both home and away matches which continued following the Heart rebrand; the Dons competing in the Coca-Cola League 1. Commentary was provided by Mike Burrows. This arrangement was not however continued into the 2009-10 season and is now broadcast on BBC Three Counties Radio. A similar incident occurred on Heart Ipswich, where Ipswich Town FC used a "get-out clause" and handed over commentary rights over to BBC Radio Suffolk. A Heart spokesman said they were pleased with this because speech does not fit in with the Heart format.

== Closure ==
On 21 June 2010, Global Radio announced plans to merge Heart MK with Heart Northants, Heart Dunstable and Heart Bedford as part of plans to reduce the Heart network of stations from 33 to 16. The new station, Heart Home Counties, began broadcasting from Dunstable at 10:00am on 16 July 2010 following the final edition of Heart Breakfast with Wes Venn. The station still broadcasts on 103.3 to Milton Keynes as Heart Home Counties and is no longer affiliated with Horizon Radio.
