= Capital Disney =

- United Kingdom
- Frequencies: DAB; Sky Digital: 0175; Virgin Media: 960 and Online

Programming
- Format: Children's radio

Ownership
- Owner: GCap Media PLC; The Walt Disney Company
- Sister stations: 95.8 Capital FM, Capital Gold

History
- First air date: 17 October 2002
- Last air date: 29 June 2007
- Former call signs: Cube

Links
- Website: www.capitaldisney.co.uk

Capital Disney was a British digital radio station owned and operated by GCap Media and The Walt Disney Company.

Targeted at 10–to–16–year–olds, the station was broadcast across the UK on DAB Digital Radio in selected areas, launching in October 2002. It closed in June 2007.

== Background ==
In 1998, Capital Radio Group (later GCap Media) announced plans to launch a kids-only format radio station, bidding for the North East England FM licence. Called Fun Radio, the licence was eventually won by Chrysalis Group, who launched Galaxy 105-106.

=== The Cube ===
The station aired in 2001 under the name of Cube (the name originally chosen for Century London) in several regional areas of England and Wales with a purely new pop music format aimed at young teens. Because Cube was on DAB, at the time very few people listened to the service.

It shared studio space with Life and Century London and shared Kevin Palmer as the senior manager.

== History ==
In February 2002, Disney announced a joint venture with Capital Radio to create and develop Capital Disney, replacing Cube. Capital Disney started broadcasting on 17 October 2002.

In May 2007, it was that Capital Disney would close down in June 2007 after five years. A statement on the Capital Disney website told that both GCap and The Walt Disney Company had agreed to "pursue their interests individually."

Capital Disney started to leave DAB multiplexes in at the end of June 2007, being replaced with Traffic Radio or XFM.

Due to an operational freeze at Sky, Capital Disney remained on air until July 2007, however, with the original name of 'Cube', as the Walt Disney Company had agreed with GCap Media to only contract their name until June 2007.

== Playlist ==
Capital Disney played a range of chart music and new acts. Originally, talking story books could be heard often during school hours, but were replaced by non-stop music from 9 am until 1 pm and then a DJ, James Beckingham, from 1 to 4 pm, under the name of "Daytime". They also played artists that didn't get any airplay on mainstream radio such as The Lovebites and album tracks from artists that appeared on the playlist.

Overnight, Capital Disney played non-stop hits, however previously to this overnight was the home of non-stop chillout music. This ceased in 2003 and later this type of music could be heard on sister station Chill.

== Presenters ==
The final line up of presenters at closure was Adam Morris, known on air as The General, James Beckingham, Matt James, Val Mellon, Leigh Purves, Nigel Mitchell, Andrew Rendle, known as Radio Rendle, Adam O'Neill, Saffron Oddy and Sophie Bruce. Previous presenters on the station have included Allan Lake, Tim Lichfield, known as Tiger Tim, Korry Denison, Andy Kench, Dan Marsh, Kelli Nelson, Will Chambers, Carl Carter and Gema Ensenat.

== Awards ==
In 2004, the station won the NTL Digital Radio station of the year award.

In 2005, the station was nominated for and won the Sony Radio Academy Award for 'Digital Terrestrial Radio Station' of the year, against BBC 6 Music and BBC 7 (later BBC Radio 4 Extra). The judges noted that the station "[filled] a genuine gap in the market with a professional and entertaining service directly meeting the needs of an under-served audience."

The station was nominated for the same award in 2006. Planet Rock, another GCap Media station, was presented with the award.
