= Amber Radio =

Radio station in East Anglia, England (1995–2007)

- Norwich and Ipswich; England
- Broadcast area: Norfolk and Suffolk
- Frequency: 1152, 1170, 1251 KHz

Programming
- Format: Classic hits

Ownership
- Owner: East Anglian Radio Group

History
- First air date: 24 September 1995
- Last air date: 3 August 2007

Amber Radio was originally a classic hits/gold radio station operating from studios in both Norwich and Ipswich, England. It was the AM sister station of Radio Broadland and SGR and served Norfolk and Suffolk, covering a population of over a million for several years.

Amber Radio returned to the airwaves in Norwich and Norfolk and parts of north Suffolk in September 2023. It broadcast on the Norfolk local DAB multiplex, as well as on smart speaker and online. The station was operated on a voluntary basis by mainly former Amber and Broadland staff members as a not-for-profit business.

== History ==
The station was launched after East Anglian Radio decided to make better use of the group's medium wave frequencies. On 24 September 1995, the AM frequencies of Broadland and SGR fm became Amber Radio, playing mainly music from the 1960s and 1970s, allowing the FM stations to focus more on current and recent chart hits. All the stations were programmed by EAR group programme director Mike Stewart, with Dave Brown in Norwich and Mark Pryke at Ipswich as local heads of presentation. Programmes emanated from the two broadcast centres for both group and separate areas.

The station continued for some time in the same format and under the same management after a takeover of the East Anglian Radio group by GWR about a year later. Amber Radio was eventually renamed Classic Gold Amber and it joined GWR's Classic Gold Digital Network of stations in 1998.

1998 saw GWR begin to pressurise the Radio Authority to allow them to 'network' Classic Gold for up to 20 hours a day. This meant that all of the stations in the Classic Gold network would receive the same programmes for most of the day, including the stations in Norwich and Ipswich. GWR's argument was that the use of higher profile presenters would give listeners a better quality of service. The Radio Authority agreed to the change and all the stations began sharing the programmes produced in Dunstable in Bedfordshire, more than 100 miles from the Norwich studios. At this stage, the only local programme remaining on Classic Gold Amber was the Breakfast Show, this was later changed to Drivetime to allow Mike Read and later Dave Lee Travis to present a networked breakfast show.

Due to GWR exceeding the ownership limit of stations, the Classic Gold stations were sold to UBC Media, although GWR kept hold of a 20 per cent stake. On 3 August 2007 the stations were re-branded as Gold. This followed the GCap Media purchase of the Classic Gold network and the merging of the Capital Gold and Classic Gold stations.

== Branding ==
Prior to being taken over by GWR, Amber Radio's station idents were specially written by American jingles specialist, Bruce Upchurch and produced by UK-based David Arnold Music with Mike Stewart at Thompson Creative in Dallas, Texas.

From the start, Amber Radio, along with its sister stations, Broadland 102 (Norfolk) and SGR FM / SGR Colchester (Suffolk / Essex), broadcast jingles made at TM Studios (previously Century 21), also in Dallas, Texas.

== Revival ==
In August 2023, it was announced that Amber Radio would return to the airwaves in Norwich, around Norfolk and parts of north Suffolk on the Now Digital Norfolk local DAB multiplex, as well as on smart speaker and online. The launch date was set for 4 September 2023, with some of the presenters, who originally broadcast on Amber and Broadland, returning to the new station.

The revival was the idea of the station's original Programme Director, Mike Stewart, supported by Bob Norman, formerly Finance Director and later Managing Director of Broadland. The station's Classic Hits format featured Adult Contemporary/Gold tracks from recent decades, with local and national information and news.

At the end of August 2024, it was announced that Amber Radio would close on DAB, due to cost issues. It has since continued broadcasting on smart-speaker and online with a reduced service, featuring mainly music. Presenters broadcasting each weekend include Mark Pryke, Simon Jones, Pete Revell and Andrew Cooper.
