= Queensgate shopping centre =

Queensgate shopping centre may refer to:

- Queensgate shopping centre, United Kingdom, a shopping centre in Peterborough
- Queensgate Shopping Centre, New Zealand, a shopping centre in Lower Hutt
