= Heart Norwich =

Radio station in Norwich, England

Heart 102.4
- Norwich; England
- Broadcast area: Norfolk and north Suffolk
- Frequency: 102.4 MHz

Programming
- Format: Hot AC

Ownership
- Owner: Heart Network, Global Radio

History
- First air date: 1 October 1984

Heart Norwich (formerly Radio Broadland) is an Independent Local Radio station for Norfolk and North Suffolk, including Norwich, Great Yarmouth and Lowestoft, until early 2009. The station is owned and operated by Global Radio as part of the Heart Network.

== Station history ==
On 1 October 1984, a new independent local radio station called "Radio Broadland" was launched by a Norfolk-based group with experience in local business, newspapers and television, but little in radio.

Several people with extensive radio experience were brought in to start the station. Russell Stuart arrived from Gwent Broadcasting in Newport as managing director, Mike Stewart from Radio West in Bristol as programme controller and Robb Young moved from Radio Orwell in Ipswich as sales manager.

Stewart put together the first team of presenters. Nick Risby joined from Red Rose Radio in Preston, Tony Gillham came from Chiltern and BBC Radio Bedfordshire, Dave Brown from Radio Tees, Rob Chandler from Radio Orwell and Adrian Finighan from Gwent Radio. Dave Brown became programme controller of the station in the late 1990s, while Rob Chandler remained for 30 years, including more than 25 years as breakfast presenter, until leaving the station in December 2013. Another long server was Chrissie Jackson, who lasted for 27 years including 14 as joint breakfast host, until leaving at the same time as Rob Chandler. Bob Harris presented a weekly show on the station for a time after it launched, while he was living in the area.

For the first two years, Radio Broadland went off air at 10 pm until 6 am the following morning. The station simulcasted on 97.6 FM and 1152 AM for three years, but in 1987, due to national changes in local radio frequencies, moved to 102.4 FM. Broadland at the end of the 1980s was achieving an audience reach of 50 per cent and average weekly listening of up to 18 hours per listener, some of the best in the UK.

In 1990, Broadland took over Suffolk Group Radio, which owned Radio Orwell in Ipswich and Saxon Radio in Bury St Edmunds and, to reflect the addition of the new stations, the company became East Anglian Radio. The two Suffolk stations were renamed and re-launched as SGR fm in 1992. The group later won the licence to launch a station in Colchester under the SGR banner in 1993.

Initially, Radio Broadland played both classic hit music and current chart hits, but in 1995 the decision was made by the EAR group to make better use of the AM slot. Amber Radio was created in Norfolk and Suffolk playing 60s and 70s music, whilst Broadland 102 focused more on current and recent chart hits. The EAR group continued to be run by the original Broadland management team.

In 1996, the GWR Group bid more than £25 million for the East Anglian Radio group, which later resulted in changes to the station such as networked programming and a new strapline of "Today's Better Music Mix". The original management remained in different roles with GWR and then GCap, but had all left by 2003. Mike Stewart and Russell Stuart were part of a new company, Norwich Radio Group, which narrowly failed to win a new ILR licence advertised in 2005 for Norwich.

In 2007, the station reverted to the name of Radio Broadland, adopting 'More Music Variety' to reflect an emphasis on classic hits in place of chart material. Also that year, as with all of GCap's One Network, the station gained a new logo and website.

An offer of £375 million for the GCap group from Global Radio, owner of Heart and LBC in London and Galaxy station, was accepted in 2008. All GCap's senior management departed on completion of the takeover.

== Heart re-brand ==
In January 2009, Radio Broadland was renamed as Heart Norwich, as part of a major re-branding involving 29 stations owned by Global Radio. By this time, local programming was restricted to daily breakfast and weekday drivetime with all other output networked from London.

=== Network restructuring ===
On 21 June 2010, Global Radio announced plans to merge Heart Norwich with Heart Ipswich as part of plans to reduce the Heart network of stations from 33 to 16. The new station, Heart East Anglia, began broadcasting from Norwich on 3 September 2010.

The former Radio Broadland studios in Norwich were closed, after nearly 35 years, in the summer of 2019, and the building was put up for sale. Broadcasting on the Heart network moved from a local to a regional basis, with Heart East Anglia emanating from studios at Milton Keynes.

In April 2021, it was announced that the University of East Anglia would open a broadcast journalism course centre at the Colegate building in the autumn. It meant that the still-intact studio areas would be retained, just a few weeks before they were due to be demolished.

In June 2025 the Broadland name returned to the airwaves as a new station on DAB across Norfolk and North Suffolk
