= Heart Breakfast with Wes Venn =

Radio show

- Developed by: Heart
- Presented by: Wes Venn (2008-2010); Ros Hale (1998-2010); Trevor Marshall (1991-2006); Andrew Whyatt-Sames (1998-2008)
- Country of origin: United Kingdom
- Original language: English
- No. of episodes: 10

Production
- Producer: Stephen Allden
- Production locations: Crownhill, Milton Keynes
- Running time: 4 hours (excluding adverts)

Original release
- Network: Heart 103.3
- Release: 5 July – 16 July 2010

Related
- Heart Breakfast with Wes and Ros; Heart Breakfast with Stuart and Natalie

Heart Breakfast with Wes Venn was a radio show broadcast 6am to 10am weekdays on Heart's Milton Keynes station, Heart 103.3 (now Heart Home Counties). It was hosted by Wes Venn and sponsored by Pilling Renault. Wes now presents the afternoon show on Bucks Radio.

== History and overview ==
From 1998, the breakfast show on Horizon Radio was presented by "The Morning Crew", made-up of Trevor Marshall, Andrew Whyatt-Sames (better-known as "Cueball") and Ros Hale. The show won the GCap Media Breakfast Show of the Year award in 2003 and 2005, and the trio also had a Sunday morning slot on London's Capital FM for a time. When Marshall left in 2006, the show was rebranded as Cueball and Ros at Breakfast and ran for two years. Cueball bowed-out in 2008 in order to pursue a career as a business psychologist, shortly before the Heart rebrand, and was replaced by Wes Venn, who had previously presented the drivetime show. He was subsequently replaced by Joe Rudd; Lucy Ellis fronted Heart Drivetime up until the station's closure. Following Horizon's transition to Heart, the breakfast show was rebranded, this time as Heart Breakfast with Wes and Ros, débuting on Monday 5 January 2009. On Friday 2 July 2010, Ros – the last connection to the Horizon Morning Crew – left the Milton Keynes station. The following Monday, she joined Heart Cambridgeshire to front their new breakfast show, Heart Breakfast with Kev and Ros. The Milton Keynes show was presented exclusively by Wes Venn until the station's merger with Heart stations in Northamptonshire, Bedfordshire and Dunstable. The final show aired on Friday 16 July 2010. The breakfast show on Heart Home Counties is presented by Stuart Miles and Natalie Besbrode, formerly of Heart Northants.

== The Time Tunnel ==
In line with the rest of the rest of the Heart network, the Milton Keynes show broadcast The Time Tunnel from 9am to 10am. The idea behind the segment was that the DJs played a number of songs from a certain year, as well as gave out hints, and listeners texted in their guesses at what year the songs all came from. A correct text was selected at random to win Odeon cinema tickets. Since the end of 2009, there were two years per morning: whilst the first was a competition for cinema tickets, the second was just for fun.

== Weekends ==
Wes returned for Saturday Breakfast each Saturday from 8am to 12pm on Heart, whilst Mikey Faulkner presented the Sunday morning show during the same time slot. On bank holidays, including Christmas Day, Wes and Ros presented the show in its normal format but from 8am to noon.
