= Alex Gerlis =

British writer

- Born: 1955 (age 70–71); Lincolnshire, England
- Citizenship: British
- Occupations: Novelist, journalist
- Website: https://alexgerlis.co.uk/

Alex Gerlis is a British novelist and former BBC journalist.

== Early life and education ==
Gerlis was born in Grimsby, Lincolnshire, England. He graduated with a degree in Law and Politics from Hull University in 1977.

== Career ==
Gerlis worked for the BBC for nearly thirty years as a television journalist and held senior editorial and training roles. He started as a researcher on the programme Panorama with a short-term contract. His work for the BBC took him to Europe, the United States, the Middle East, and China. He led the training of the BBC's journalists as the Head of Training at the BBC College of Journalism. Alex Gerlis represented the BBC on the Broadcast Journalism Training Council. He also chaired the European Broadcasting Union Training Committee. Alex left the BBC in 2011 to write full-time. As an author, he has written historical espionage novels that focus on the Second World War. His novels are published by Canelo (Alex Gerlis | Canelo). His literary agent is Gordon Wise at the Curtis Brown Literary Agency (Alex Gerlis - Curtis Brown). The Financial Times named Gerlis's Every Spy a Traitor as one of the year's best thrillers.

== Bibliography (selected) ==
Spy Masters Series

- The Best of Our Spies (2012)
- The Swiss Spy (2015)
- Vienna Spies (2017)
- The Berlin Spies (2018)

Prince of Spies Series

- Prince of Spies (2020)
- Sea of Spies (2020)
- Ring of Spies (2020)
- End of Spies (2021)

Wolf Pack Spies Series

- Agent in Berlin (2021)
- Agent in Peril (2022)
- Agent in the Shadows (2023)

Double Agent Series

- Every Spy a Traitor (2024)
- The Second Traitor (2025)
- City of Traitors (to be published August 2026)
