= East Anglian Radio =

British radio broadcasting company

East Anglian Radio was a company based in Norwich that operated 3 Independent Local Radio stations in the counties of Norfolk, Suffolk and Essex in the UK.

The stations owned by the group were:

- Radio Broadland in Norwich.
- SGR FM in Ipswich & Bury St Edmunds (originally, Radio Orwell in Ipswich and Saxon Radio in Bury St Edmunds).
- SGR Colchester in Colchester.
- Amber Radio in Ipswich and Norwich.

== History ==
East Anglian Radio was set up in 1990, following Radio Broadland's takeover of Suffolk Group Radio, which was broadcasting at the time as Radio Orwell and Saxon Radio. The Suffolk group had made an unsuccessful offer to take over Broadland the year before.

Orwell was one of the early independent radio stations launched in the UK in 1975, followed by Saxon in 1982. Broadland went on air later in 1984, but quickly established itself as market leader in its area, with some of the highest-ever listening figures for an ILR station (50% audience reach and an average of over 17 hours a week per listener in 1989 and 1990).

The management team that had successfully launched Broadland in Norfolk and North Suffolk took over the running of the new larger group, with Russell Stuart as Managing Director, Mike Stewart as Programme Director, and Robb Young as Sales Director. Bob Norman became Finance Director.

The Suffolk stations were re-vamped and re-branded as SGR in 1992, resulting in the closure of the Bury St Edmunds studios and a move to new, modern studios opened in Ipswich in 1993. The same year, the group successfully applied for the ILR licence for Colchester, launching SGR Colchester in the town later that year.

In 1995, a decision was made by the EAR Group to make better use of its AM frequencies in Norfolk and Suffolk (Colchester was an FM-only service) by creating a new station. Amber Radio was launched to focus mainly on music from the 60's and 70's, leaving Broadland and SGR on FM to play more recent and current chart hits. Amber had split programming at peak times for each area, but programmes were shared at other times, emanating from both the Norwich and Ipswich studios. By the mid-90s, the three FM services were each market leader and the Amber service had one of the highest audience reaches for an AM output in the country.

In 1996, GWR Group, which had been acquiring large numbers of radio companies for about seven years, made a successful bid of about £25 million for East Anglian Radio. The takeover saw major changes later in the year, with the EAR stations gradually assimilated into the GWR set-up as individual operations and EAR management moving internally to different roles. Stuart became Regional Managing Director for the East stations of GWR and later MD of GWR Digital, Stewart was MD of the SGR group, Norman was MD of Broadland and Young became Sales Director for the East stations.

By 2003, only Norman remained of the original EAR team. Mike Stewart and Russell Stuart helped to form the locally-based Norwich Radio Group, which narrowly failed to win a new ILR licence for Norwich, advertised in 2005. Stewart later became a director of Park Radio, a community radio group which eventually launched a Diss-based station for South Norfolk and Mid Suffolk, in November 2017. After leaving GWR, Norman worked for the former Orion group and later Bauer as a station director.

A merger between GWR and Capital Radio (GCap Media) followed in 2005 and then a further take-over of GCAP by Global Radio.

The SGR stations and Broadland had by then lost considerable local input, broadcasting more networked programming with a shared new strapline of Today's Better Music Mix and similar logos. Eventually, they lost their heritage names and became part of the Heart Network of stations, sometimes referred to as Heart Norwich, Heart Colchester and Heart Ipswich, before Global eventually decided to close down the Ipswich and Colchester studios in 2010. Amber Radio became Classic Gold Amber in 1998, then Classic Gold, then simply Gold.

The East Anglian Radio Group had no involvement in East Anglian Radio Services, a Lowestoft-based business operating in theatrical production since the mid-1980s.
