= Century Digital =

England
- Broadcast area: London & Birmingham
- Frequency: DAB

Programming
- Format: Adult contemporary

Ownership
- Owner: GMG Radio

History
- First air date: 30 September 2001
- Last air date: March 24, 2007

Links
- Website: www.centurydigital.co.uk

Century Digital was a radio station for London and Birmingham established in 2001 and disestablished in 2007.

== About the station ==
When CE Digital won the licence to operate a Digital Audio Broadcasting (DAB) multiplex in London, one of the stations they proposed to offer was a new Adult contemporary music station from the then Capital Radio plc. The station was originally developed under the name Cube, but after the takeover of the regional Century stations in the North of England, previously owned by Border Television, the Cube name was dropped in favour of making the new station an offshoot of these, under the name Century London.

Contemporary artists such as Blur, Oasis, Pulp etc. were interspersed with classics from bands such as Thin Lizzy, Queen, Slade, Rolling Stones, Dream Academy. The station also broadcast shows at the weekend that were heard elsewhere on the Century network with presenters such as Noddy Holder and Mike Sweeney.

When the format of the other Century stations changed towards a female bias 'London' retained the older rockier (male) songs, but added the female-friendly 'current' hits (due to an unfixable fault with the station database in the scheduling system Selector software). It also broadcast Sunday to Thursday the networked "Confessional" show presented by Mark Forrest & SJ (later Holly Samos) that all the other Century Stations took. This was produced and presented from the 'Digital' studio in the Capital Radio headquarters in Leicester Square. The same studio also initially broadcast Paul Phear's Breakfast Show on Life and all the Cube/Capital Disney shows. The show was the only live programme on the station and was transmitted to IRN and then via their satellite feed to the other Century stations.

== Satellite launch ==
After the station launched on the Astra satellite at 28.2 East and appeared on the Sky EPG sometime later, the music fell into line with the other stations (after a new station manager took over who had time to create a new station database in the scheduling system) and was rebranded Century Digital (also launching on DAB in Birmingham). The satellite feed for live programmes (now including Hairbrush Divas) was dropped in favour of ATM lines set up between the stations, which was a cost saving. However, when problems occurred with these lines to the Century Stations, the studio 'tech ops' had instructions to patch in the Astra 28.2 broadcast and use this feed until the line was fixed.

== The end of the station ==
Following the sale of Century East Midlands to Chrysalis and the other Century stations to GMG Radio, Century Digital became a GMG brand. Century Digital ceased transmission in London on 24 March 2007 and was replaced with sister station Real Radio (Digital).

== See also ==
- 100-102 Century FM (North East)
- 105.4 Century FM (North West)
