= Classic Gold WABC =

Coordinates: 51.8903°N 0.5298°W

- England
- Broadcast area: Wolverhampton and Shropshire
- Frequencies: 990 kHz in Wolverhampton; 1017 kHz in Shropshire; DAB

Programming
- Format: Oldies

Ownership
- Owner: Classic Gold Digital (UBC)

History
- First air date: 15 January 1989; 37 years ago
- Last air date: 3 August 2007; 18 years ago

Classic Gold WABC was a United Kingdom radio station, broadcasting to much of Wolverhampton and Shropshire from studios in Dunstable. Regional news, weather, events and community information, local advertising (separate for Wolverhampton and Shropshire) and a four-hour live weekday regional programme came from a studio centre in Wolverhampton, home also to Beacon Radio.

The station, along with the rest of the Classic Gold network, was replaced on 3 August 2007 by a new network called simply Gold, the result of the merger of the Classic Gold and Capital Gold networks under one owner, GCap Media.

Bauer closed the 990/1017kHz medium wave outlets at the beginning of May 2020.

== History ==
The station began as Radio WABC in 1989 (the letters WABC standing for Wolverhampton and Black Country). The offshoot of the area's long-established Beacon Radio, it was launched as a response to government disapproval of the simulcasting of radio companies' FM programming on their mediumwave frequencies. Beacon began to cater for a younger audience following the frequency split, while the new AM service started to aim its programming toward a much older audience. Beacon's American management had originally wanted to use the name WABC for Beacon, but at the time of its launch during the 1970s, the IBA had considered the name too American (the W ITU prefix is designated for call signs in the United States; WABC in that country is used by an unrelated radio station in New York City).

WABC's opening show at 10am on 15 January 1989, was presented by Bill Young, who kicked proceedings off with Frank Sinatra's Nice 'n' Easy, a song which it was felt would reflect the feel of the station, and which was used as its strapline. While other similar AM stations of the time were focusing on playing music from the 1950s through to the 1970s, WABC adopted a format of easy listening and big band tracks. The station also had a distinctly American flavour to its shows, with presenters often referred to as 'the good guys', and weather forecasts giving temperatures in 'WABC degrees'.

WABC first transmitted to Wolverhampton only on 990 kHz, but in December 1990, a frequency was added for Shropshire (1017 kHz), and again the vocals of Frank Sinatra heralded its launch. Jim Duncan launched the Shropshire service at 10am on Sunday December 30th 1990. However, the music policy of the station gradually began to change, eventually shifting towards a standard 'Gold' format. Presenters began to play fewer big band and easy listening tunes, and more music generally associated with 'Gold' services. Music from the 1960s and 1970s became more prominent, together with tracks from the 1980s and contemporary chart hits. The 'Nice'n'Easy' strapline was also dropped in a bid to appeal to a younger audience, and replaced with 'The best mix of golden oldies'.

In 1993 WABC was sold to GWR. One of the conditions of the sale negotiated by Beacon was that the format would be retained for three years. When that period ran out in 1996, WABC underwent a management change, while GWR made significant alterations to the format. A restricted playlist of 800 songs was adopted, while on-air presenters were replaced the following year and the station relaunched as Classic Gold WABC. Finally on 1 April 1998, programming at WABC was networked with other Classic Gold stations, with only four hours of local weekday programming remaining in the Midlands. The WABC name was eventually dropped in 2006, when the station was renamed Classic Gold 990/1017.

On 3 August 2007, the station, along with the rest of the Classic Gold network, was replaced by a new network called simply Gold, the result of the merger of the Classic Gold and Capital Gold networks under one owner, GCap Media.
