= WABC =

WABC may refer to:

- WABC (AM), a New York City radio station (770 AM)
- WABC-TV, a New York City TV station (channel 7)
- WPLJ, a New York City radio station (95.5 FM), which held the call sign WABC-FM from 1953 until 1971
- WHSQ, a New York City radio station (880 AM), which held the WABC call sign from 1926 until 1946
- WWNC, an Asheville, North Carolina radio station (570 AM), which held the WABC call sign from 1925 until 1926
- Classic Gold WABC, a defunct British radio station
