= Heart 102.7 =

Heart 102.7 may refer to:

- Heart Peterborough in Peterborough
- Heart Sussex in Reigate
