= Core (radio station) =

- United Kingdom
- Frequency: DAB: 11D Digital One

Programming
- Format: Teen and Twenties Pop and Chart

Ownership
- Owner: GCap Media; Daily Mail and General Trust

History
- First air date: 15 November 1999
- Last air date: 11 January 2008

Links
- Website: www.corefreshhits.com

Core was a digital radio station broadcasting across the UK on the Digital One and streamed online. It was aimed at 16- to 24-year-olds with a focus on new music.

== Station history ==
Core was originally owned by GWR Group (which became GCap Media and then Global Radio after the station's closure). It was launched on the Digital One multiplex on 15 November 1999 at 1 pm (GMT), alongside four other stations, Planet Rock, Classic FM, Talk Radio (now Talksport) and Virgin Radio (now Absolute Radio), with other stations joining the multiplex in the following months.

The station gradually built up the schedule over the years, to include more DJs and shows. In August 2006, a breakfast show was introduced, presented by Allan Lake, previously from Capital Disney. However, as of 31 March 2007, the station changed to a jukebox format, known by the station as "Access All Areas." This involves the DJs, apart from Ryan Seacrest, who presents the American Top 40, being removed from the station, and the only voice appearing on the station will be the listeners. To encourage interaction, the station used their MySpace account, a new MySpace discussion group, Skype, SMS text, online and a phone message machine to take requests and get audio clips to add to the stations output.

The presenter lineup prior to the changes was Allan Lake, Nicola Bonn, Sophie Bruce, Philippa Collins, Nick Ludlow, Tim Cocker, Ben Moss, Val Mellon, Sally Hudson, Ben Glover and Kevin Hughes. The syndicated American Top 40 with Ryan Seacrest was broadcast as part of the weekend line-up.

== Closure ==
The station left Sky and Virgin Media on 3 July 2007, with other GCap stations Capital Disney, Chill and Classic Gold.

In January 2008, it was announced on the website and in email to listeners, that the station was to close on 11 January 2008. The station closed at 23:59 on 11 January 2008. The final song to play on the station was "So Long & Thanks For All The Fish" by Hilary Summers, Kemi Omniyi & The R'svp Voices. The online stream continued to play until 01:07, where the final song was "Hey There Delilah" by The Plain White T's. The DAB station was replaced with BFBS.

== Interactivity ==
The station created the CoreControl Chart from the most requested songs each day. Core was one of the UK's first radio stations with a presence on MySpace. The station relaunched its website in late 2006 with extra content, a music download service and information on currently playing and upcoming tracks. This aspects will be the basis of the station after the presenters are removed.

The station won three awards for its interactivity :

Date	Award
June 2001	The ntl New Media Award
June 2003	The ntl Commercial Radio Technical Innovation Award
July 2004	The ntl Commercial Radio Award for Technical Innovation (Creation New Platforms)

== A Face For Radio ==
"A Face For Radio" was launched in spring 2006 with the aim to find a new presenter for the station. Friends of possible candidates made nominations, which were then reduced to a final ten.

The ten competed in a variety of tasks to demonstrate their presenting skills, whilst gathering friends on MySpace. Each week, the two contestants with the least friends went head-to-head in a challenge to keep their place. Core's Programme Manager, Bern Leckie, decided who stayed in the competition based on their performance.

The two finalists were Will Goodhand and Matt Treacy. They each broadcast a two-hour show, appealing for listener votes to decide the winner.

Will, a contestant in the UK series of Beauty and the Geek and a market research account manager, won. In January 2007 he began presenting a short-lived Monday night show, which was removed in March due to the axing of presenters.
