= Heart Cambridge =

- Cambridge; England
- Broadcast area: Cambridge, Newmarket and Haverhill
- Frequencies: FM: 97.4 & 103.0 MHz; DAB; RDS: Heart___

Programming
- Format: Hot AC

Ownership
- Owner: Heart Network, Global Radio

History
- First air date: 12 February 1989 (as CNFM)

Links
- Website: Heart Cambridge

Heart 103 (formerly Q103 and CNFM) was an Independent Local Radio station broadcasting to Cambridge on 103.0 MHz and DAB Digital Radio. Heart also broadcast in Newmarket and Haverhill on 97.4 MHz.

== History ==
The station was originally owned by Mid-Anglia Radio and began life as CNFM (Cambridge and Newmarket FM) in February 1989, before being renamed to Q103 FM in June 1994 when it was acquired by the GWR Group.

In 2004 the name was slightly adjusted to Q103 Cambridge after their launch on DAB Digital Radio. On 1 August 2007, Q103 reverted to their 2004 strapline of "Today's Best Mix", also dropping the "Cambridge" from their name to reflect the newly extended TSA area (covering Haverhill and the longly served Newmarket on the Cambridgeshire-Suffolk border). Q103 also introduced their new jingle package. On Monday 30 June 2008, Q103 along with other One Network stations adopted the strapline More Music Variety, in essence a reversion to the previous strapline.

On 5 January 2009, the station was rebranded as Heart Cambridge.

On 21 June 2010, Global Radio announced plans to merge Heart Cambridge’s programming with Heart Peterborough as part of plans to reduce the Heart network of stations from 33 to 16. The new station, Heart Cambridgeshire began broadcasting from Peterborough on Friday 2 July 2010. On 19 September 2011, the station announced it would relocate to the former Q103 studios just outside Cambridge, in Histon.

On 3 June 2019 a new national breakfast show launched, broadcast live from Leicester Square and hosted by Jamie Theakston and Amanda Holden. Hannah Clarkson became the host of a new Heart East drive show, broadcast from Milton Keynes with the Cambridge studios closing.

== Past Straplines ==
- A Better Music Mix for Cambridge
- Today's Better Music Mix
- Cambridge's Music Station
- Today's Best Mix
- More Music, Less Talk
- Today's Best Mix, Today's Best Variety
- The Best Mix of the 80s, 90s and Today
- More Music Variety
- Today's Best Mix
- More Music Variety for Cambridge
