= The Storm (radio station) =

The Storm (defunct)
United Kingdom
- Broadcast area: Various areas within the Midlands and southern UK
- Frequencies: DAB Band III, Sky Satellite Radio, NTL and Telewest

Programming
- Format: Modern Rock

Ownership
- Owner: GWR / Latterly GCap Media

History
- First air date: 2000

The Storm was a digital-only, modern rock music radio station broadcasting in parts of Central and Southern UK, and owned by GCap Media. It played music from bands such as Green Day, The Killers, Kaiser Chiefs, The Libertines, Garbage and Franz Ferdinand.

In November 2005, as part of a review of GCap Media services, it was decided that The Storm was to be replaced with Xfm on most digital radio multiplexes. This move occurred on 23 January 2006. Chill replaced The Storm on digital TV.

Live broadcasts on The Storm closed down on 20 January 2006 at 2305 GMT. The last track played by presenter Neil Grayson was Green Day's "Good Riddance (Time of your Life)".

An automated service (including a text-to-speech "DJ") playing the same music format, was left in place on three multiplex areas where Xfm was already broadcast digitally (London, Wolverhampton and Bristol). This was eventually removed in August 2006 from Bristol and Wolverhampton and from the London multiplex on 27 March 2007. Its frequency was taken over by Premier Christian Radio.
