= Holly Samos =

British radio broadcaster (born 1970)

- Born: 23 December 1970 (age 55); Guildford, Surrey, England
- Education: Ealing College (BA)
- Occupation: Radio broadcaster

Holly Samos (born 23 December 1970 in Guildford, Surrey) is a British radio broadcaster. A former member of Chris Evans's breakfast show team from the 1990s, Samos and the team released the Breaking Breakfast podcast series in 2022. After a successful music radio career Samos became the Formula 1 pit lane reporter for BBC Radio 5 Live. She currently is a freelancer for Formula One.

== Early life ==
Born to a Greek father and English mother in Surrey, Samos grew up in Oklahoma, London and Northampton. A portable radio cassette player given to her for Christmas as a child led her onto the path of broadcasting. She gained 9 O-Levels, and a BTEC National Diploma in Business & Finance at Northampton College for Further Education, before studying in London at Ealing College for a Bachelor of Arts degree in Design and Media Management.

== Early career ==
Aged 19 during her degree years in London, Samos undertook work experience for GLR (BBC Greater London Radio) as a runner and switchboard operator, where she worked on the Greenhouse radio show presented by Chris Evans. She completed her degree, and moved into the record business working for MCA Records on Piccadilly in the A&R department.

== Chris Evans period - BBC1 / Virgin Radio ==
In 1995, Chris Evans moved to the BBC to take over the Radio One Breakfast show from Steve Wright, taking previous colleagues, producer John Revell, sound engineer Dan McGrath and radio researcher Holly Samos. The 7-month contract evolved to become seven years on the breakfast show until 2001.

In September 1997, Evans and his team made a return to Breakfast Radio, on Virgin Radio.

By the middle of the May 2001, Evans was reported to have sacked his team and the Chris Evans breakfast show was dissolved.

== After Evans ==
When Samos left Virgin Radio she moved to the Century FM network/Century Digital presenting The Confessional and then the late night love show LoveLines. As a result of Jeremy Kyle taking over the late night weekly slot with Late Night Love, Samos was moved to an earlier evening slot in the weekends presenting Hairbrush Divas in late 2003.

Samos also undertook a lot of commercial work during her career, she presented for the Formula One Jordan team, the BBC's Holiday programme, and a number of fashion and beauty shows. She also works as a professional voice-over artist.

After Capital Radio took over Century Network, Samos moved to London's Heart 106.2 to present the Saturday breakfast show with Toby Anstis. She also returned to Virgin Radio as a swing shift DJ.

In March 2006, it was announced by BBC Radio 5 Live that Samos had joined their Formula One team, and reported the latest news live from the pit lane and the paddock at each grand prix.

In January 2008 she became Virgin's presenter of Sunday Early Mornings 2 – 6 am.

In 2010, she featured in the Codemasters game F1 2010, alongside David Croft (5 Live commentator). She has also been the voice behind the Renault F1 Official Podcast and Force India F1 Team Podcast.

She was not part of the BBC Radio 5 Live commentary team for the 2011 Formula One season.

After leaving BBC Radio 5 Live in 2011 Samos has worked for Formula One Management, Fanvision, AllSport, F1.com, hosts events for Formula One, various sport, music fashion and beauty companies.

From 2011 to 2020, Samos provided the official live voiceovers for the Brit Awards. She freelance presented weekend shows on BBC Radio Oxford from 2012.

In 2021 Samos and the Radio 1 breakfast show team wrote and produced the 'Breaking Breakfast' podcast series which reached No.1 in the Apple charts.

Samos is currently creating podcasts for the BBC and Formula 1.
