= Fru Hazlitt =

British broadcasting executive (born 1963)

Anne Frances Hazlitt (born April 1963) is a British broadcasting executive.

== Early life ==
She was born in south-west Surrey. She attended Downe House School from 1974 to 1980. She attended the Goldsmiths University from 1981 to 1984, where she studied English and Drama.

== Career ==
Hazlitt's career started in trade magazine publisher Centaur Communications, working in the advertising sales department.

=== Yahoo! ===
She joined Yahoo! UK in December 1999, became European Sales Director in 2000, and was managing director from 2003 to July 2005 of Yahoo! UK & Ireland. In June 2005 she was winner in the media category in the First Women Awards ceremony, organised by the CBI and Real Business magazine.

=== Virgin Radio ===
From July 2005 to March 2007 she was Chief Executive of Virgin Radio UK (since 2008 called Absolute Radio). She put Virgin Radio onto Freeview (UK). Virgin Radio UK was owned by SMG. The station group included Virgin Radio, Virgin Radio Classic Rock and Virgin Radio Groove. She resigned from Virgin Radio on 8 January 2007.

=== GCap Media ===
In May 2007 she became managing director of GCap London, the largest commercial radio group in the United Kingdom, and bought £250,000 worth of GCap shares. She was appointed Chief Executive of the company in December 2007, but left in April 2008 when the company was bought by Global Radio.

=== ITV ===
From July 2010 until March 2015, she was a managing director at ITV, at the London Television Centre (The London Studios), on the south bank of the Thames.

Media offices
Preceded by John Pearson	Chief Executive of Virgin Radio UK; July 2005 – January 2007	Succeeded by Paul Jackson
Preceded by Martina King	Managing Director of Yahoo! UK & Ireland; 2003 – July 2005	Succeeded by Jon Gisby
