= Queensgate Peterborough =

Shopping mall in Peterborough, England

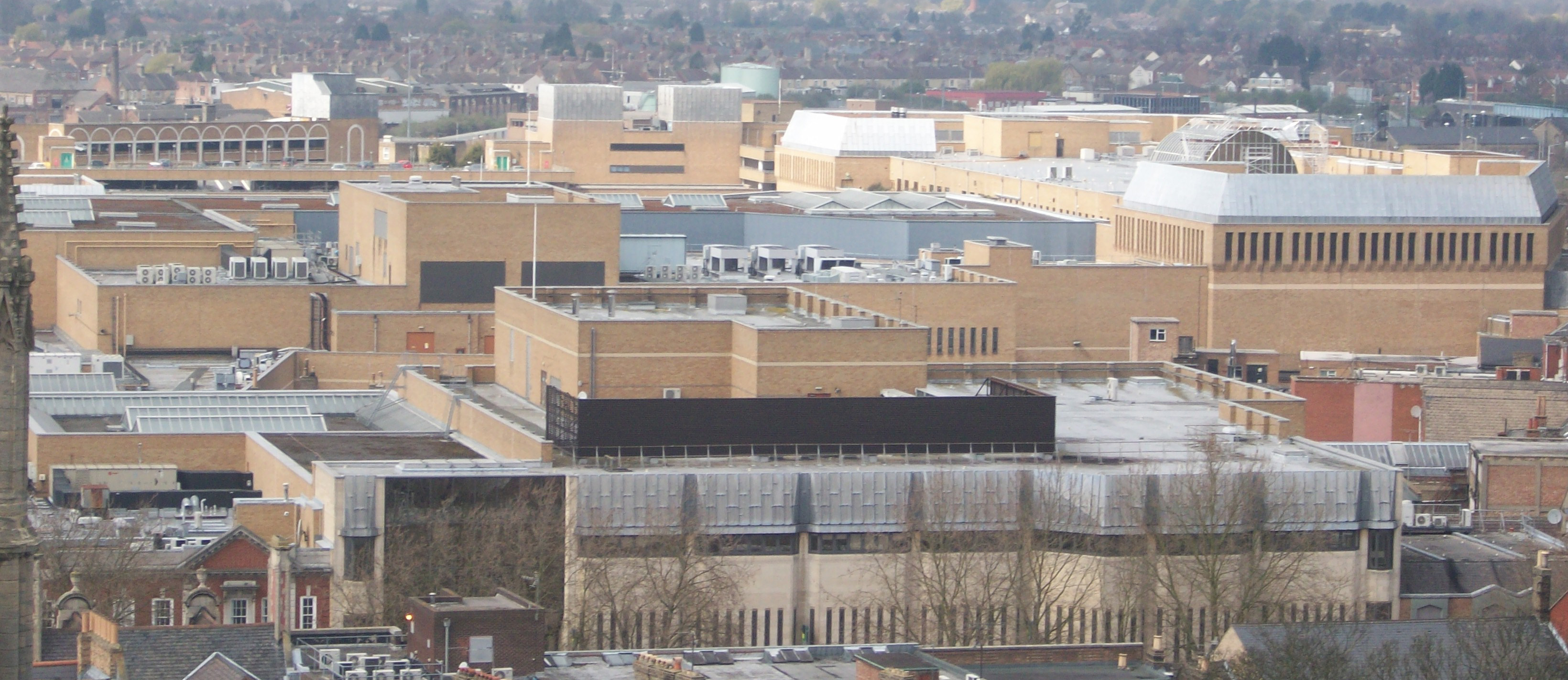
- Queensgate viewed from the top of Peterborough Cathedral
- Location: Peterborough, Cambs. PE1 1NT
- Coordinates: 52.574°N 0.244°W
- Developer: Jones Lang LaSalle (JLL)
- Manager: Lend Lease & Sovereign Centros
- Owner: Invesco Real Estate
- Num. of stores: 102
- Num. of anchor tenants: 4
- Floor area: 804,000 square feet (74,700 m^{2})
- Floors: 4
- Parking: 2,300 spaces
- Public transit: Queensgate bus station
- Website: queensgate-shopping.co.uk

The Queensgate shopping centre is located in the centre of the UK city of Peterborough, in Cambridgeshire. It contains over 100 stores and parking for 2,300 cars in four onsite multi-storey car parks. Queensgate bus station is located within the shopping centre and only a short walk from Peterborough railway station. Peterborough Shop Mobility provide wheelchairs and electric scooters to help those with limited mobility. The centre was opened by Queen Beatrix of the Netherlands on 9 March 1982.

== History ==
Peterborough was designated a new town in 1967 and the Peterborough Development Corporation decided to construct a new purpose-built shopping centre in the heart of the city. Planning permission was received in the late summer of 1976 and in November the retailer John Lewis Partnership announced that it had agreed to be the anchor shop in the new development. The opening of a John Lewis store in Peterborough marked the company's return to the city after an absence of over twenty-five years. Until 1956, when the two main blocks of the building were completely destroyed by fire, the John Lewis Partnership had a small department store in Peterborough trading under the name of Robert Sayle. Originally known as Thompsons, the shop had been renamed following the Partnership's acquisition of Selfridge Provincial Stores in 1940.

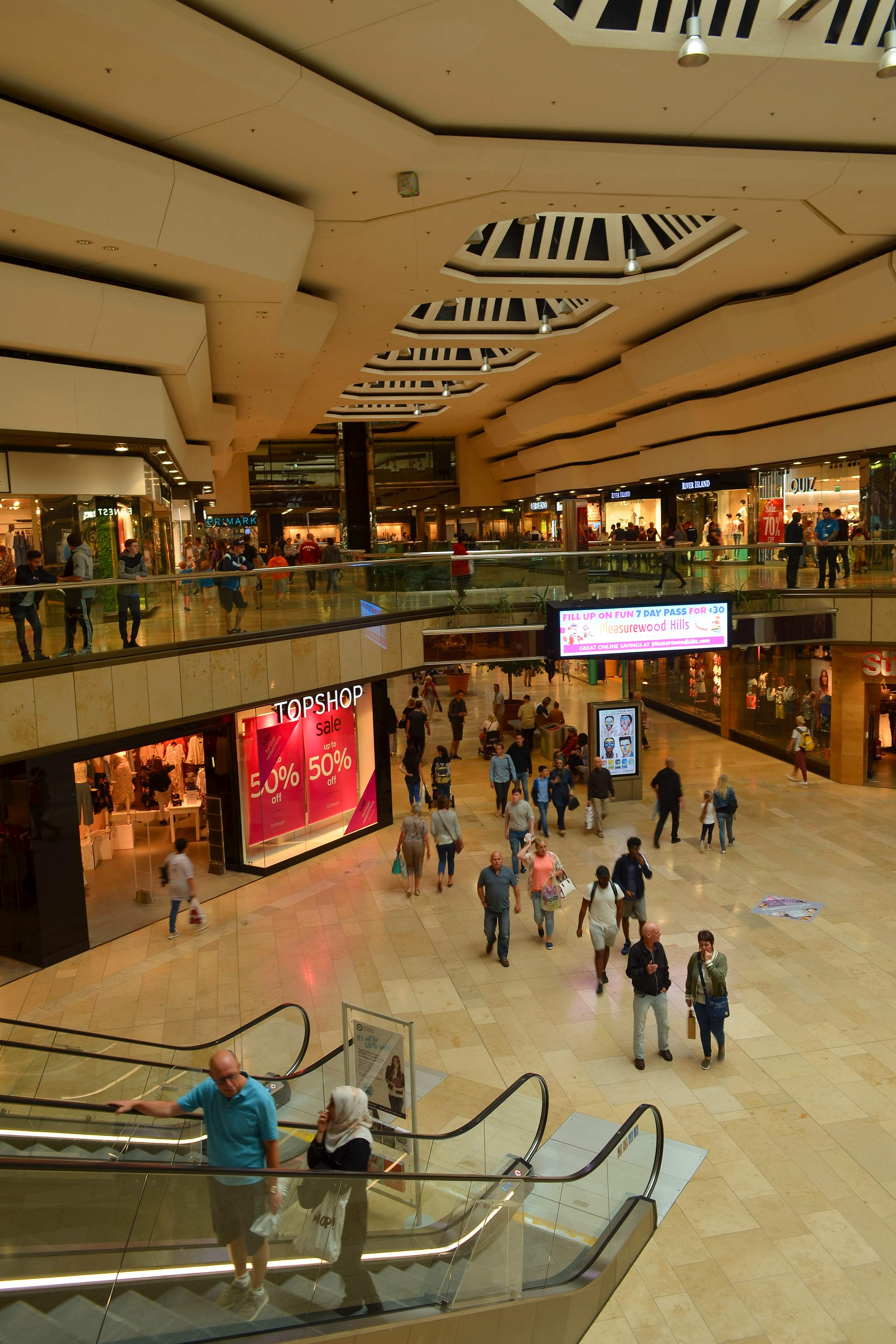
North Square, Queensgate shopping centre in July 2017

In 2005, Hammerson PLC acquired a 50% interest in the freehold of Queensgate from Norwich Union Life and Pensions for £156 million. Plans were drawn up for a 646,000 square foot (60,000 m^{2}) mixed-use development adjacent to the existing shopping centre, to be known as the North Westgate Project. If completed, the combined scheme would have formed a single 1,450,000 square feet (135,000 m^{2}) shopping center. Plans for the development were shelved in the wake of the 2008 recession.

In 2011, a £20 million revamp to Queensgate was undertaken, which included the clothing retailer Primark taking over several units and an extension to replace the units taken over. Changes to the car park removed references to local historical figures (Edith Cavell, Frank Perkins, Henry Royce and John Clare) in favour of a colour-coded system, but these were subsequently reinstated and paired with the new colour system.

In 2014, Paten Bridge, which crosses Bourges Boulevard (the A15), links Queensgate to the station quarter, was built on the site of the former Royal Mail sorting office. Later in 2018 some areas were re-paved and a number of shop fronts were updated. There has been discussion of covering the entire street with a glass roof, but the plans have not been finalised.

In 2015, a detailed planning application for a £30 million enhancement of the centre was submitted to Peterborough City Council by new owners Invesco and its managers Lendlease. The plan was to create a 77,000 square feet (7,153 m^{2}) extension in partnership with John Lewis, which has since permanently closed. The development is to include a restaurant hub and a multi-screen digital cinema. Planning permission has been granted and work is scheduled to start in 2019; tenders for the cinema and the food hall have been allocated.

In early 2020 McLaren Construction Group landed the contract to build the 77,000sqft extension, work quickly began on the site compounds which resulted in half of the bus station being closed temporarily and relocated to the Coach Park just behind The Brewery Tap. Before work could fully get underway due to the Coronavirus Pandemic work ground to a halt whilst everyone in the building trade found out where they stood, after guidelines and measures were put in place work quickly resumed on site with cranes and scaffolding being erected to provide material and personnel access to the roof. In preparation of the extension John Lewis carried out a £21 million refurbishment project on their anchor store in the centre, part of their project involved giving up around 60,000 square foot of retail space to make way for the construction for four new retail units, three of which will have two floors.

In April 2021, John Lewis announced that they would not be reopening their Peterborough Queensgate store following its closure during the COVID-19 lockdown in the United Kingdom. Despite numerous officials campaigning for the store to remain open, John Lewis took the decision to cancel its retail license with Peterborough City Council and ceased its existence in Peterborough since the store opened in the 1980s.

Next expressed an interest in moving into one of the store which was rumoured to be a 32,000 sqft retail unit directly opposite H&M, however Next closed its Queensgate store in April 2021, and is unlikely to consider a return to the centre. TK Maxx have announced they will be giving up their current store in Bridge Street to move into a vacant unit, on the Upper Ground Floor of the Central Square.

Since the reopening of Queensgate Shopping Centre following the pandemic the centre has seen various changes, with the welcoming of Black Sheep Coffee, Rich & Famous, as well as Sostrene Green submitting building control to Peterborough City Council to refurbish the former Joule's store which closed in December 2022.

Following the collapse of Empire Cinemas, the future of Queensgate Cinema development hung in the balance, waiting for a new operator to come forward to take it on. In March 2024, Odeon Group announced they would be taking on and refurbishing the cinema unit, and in September, the new 10 screen IMAX cinema was opened. Frasers Group also announced they would be refurbishing the former John Lewis store to create a Frasers store and Sports Direct store within the centre, bringing shoppers brands such as USC, Jack Wills and Game into the centre, and the store opened in December 2025.

== Radio ==
Independent local radio station Hereward Radio (now Heart Cambridgeshire) broadcast from studios at Queensgate from 1987 to 2011.

== Transport ==
Queensgate bus station is located within the shopping centre and is a short walk from Peterborough railway station, a major interchange on the East Coast Main Line.

== See also ==
- Peterborough railway station
