= Radio X (United Kingdom) =

British alternative radio station

- London; United Kingdom
- Frequencies: DAB: 11D (England, Wales and NI) Digital One; DAB: 12A (Scotland) Digital One; FM: 104.9 MHz London and the South East; FM: 97.7 MHz Manchester; Sky (UK only): 0111; Freesat: 723; TalkTalk TV: 621; Virgin Media: 960; Virgin Media Ireland: 923
- RDS: Radio X

Programming
- Format: Alternative

Ownership
- Owner: Global Radio
- Sister stations: Radio X 90s; Radio X 00s; Radio X Chilled; Radio X Classic Rock

History
- First air date: 1 September 1997
- Former names: XFM (1997–2015)

Links
- Webcast: Global Player
- Website: www.radiox.co.uk

Radio X is a British national commercial radio station focused on alternative music, primarily indie rock, and owned by Global. The station launched in 1989 as a pirate radio station named Q102, before being renamed XFM in 1992. The station became a legally licensed London-wide station in 1997, and in 2015 began national broadcasting under the name Radio X.

According to RAJAR as of Q4 2025, Radio X has reached 2.5 million listeners. The Chris Moyles Show has received 1.1 million listeners, beating Virgin Radio's Chris Evans morning show.

== History ==
In 1989, the pirate radio presenter Sammy Jacob, known as DJ Sammy Jay on London's Horizon Radio and Solar Radio, set up an indie music station called Q102, which started broadcasting rock music on a part-time basis from 1 January 1989, with other hours following the soul format of another local station called CD93.

Jacob was one of the presenters on this forerunner to Xfm alongside Adrian Gibson, Donald Johnson, Steve Lamacq and CD93's Bob Matthews (a DJ also known as Bob Mower), with the format changing to play only indie rock music by 1990. In late 1990, Fiction Records founder, and manager of The Cure, Chris Parry got involved with the London station, even though at that point it still did not have any official authorisation to operate. The Cure's singer Robert Smith used the radio as a platform to promote the release of a Cure remix album Mixed Up during night-time radio shows, broadcast live on the air.

By 1991, Q102 was off-air, with Jacob re-organising this rock station as Xfm in Clapton, East London. At this point the station was still a pirate radio station operating out of his parents' flat, though Jacob had plans to get a number of restricted service licences for Xfm, which would make Xfm a legal radio station even though it could only be on the capital's airwaves for short periods of time.

Xfm was officially created in London in 1992 by Jacob and Parry, with the station broadcasting at festivals and legally from Fiction's Charlotte Street headquarters on short-term licences. When the station faced difficulties in 1993, Smith and Parry organised a one-off open air festival titled XFM Great Expectations in London's Finsbury Park on 13 June, with the Cure at the top of the bill. The XFM Great Expectations event was covered by the media including TV channels which talked about the XFM radio in interviews with Smith.

In 1994, Xfm unsuccessfully applied to broadcast full-time across London. However, two years later, Xfm was awarded what was to be the final London-wide FM licence, and the station went on air on a permanent basis on 1 September 1997. During the following year the station played a range of music from its studios in 97 Charlotte Street. Jacob would later go on to co-found NME Radio (now TMM) and CDNX (Camden Experience) in 2008 and 2015 respectively.

In 1998, Xfm was acquired by the Capital Radio Group (now part of Global Radio) and relocated from Charlotte Street to Capital's headquarters at Leicester Square, where it remains today. On 23 August that year, Xfm was closed down for four days, during which a test tape featuring mainstream soft rock acts was looped. The station subsequently relaunched with a more mainstream format, and a new advert featuring a cartoon radio saying "Don't be afraid!", which referred to the perceived inaccessibility of its old format. The soft rock revamp was not a success, culminating in listener-led protests outside the Capital Radio studios. Listeners also lodged objections with the Radio Authority, which found Xfm to be acting in a manner contrary to its licence requirements, and a degree of alternative output was eventually restored, particularly through night-time playlists and specialist shows.

Following the take-over by Capital, the station dropped its wide-ranging music policy, which was replaced by a format based on USA college stations. The first audience figures after this change showed a sharp decline. The DJs were no longer able to select some of their own tracks, and specialist shows were dropped. The station soon became more male-orientated and featured football coverage and "laddish" output. This came to an end after the Radio Authority fined Xfm £50,000 for breakfast presenter Tom Binns' jokes about bestiality on air.

Capital Radio attempted to increase Xfm's listening figures, recruiting DJs such as Zoe Ball, former BBC Radio 1 presenter, and re-recruiting comedians Ricky Gervais and Stephen Merchant, who took voluntary redundancy when Capital bought the station, after the first airing of The Office. Together with Zane Lowe and Christian O'Connell, this yielded growing listening figures.

In 2012, host John Kennedy was the only member of the presenter lineup that had been with the radio station since its first broadcasts. His new music show, X-Posure is the station's longest running show and is credited as being the first to give radio play to artists including Adele, Florence and the Machine, Razorlight and Mumford & Sons.

=== Expansion of the Xfm network ===
Xfm logo used from 2003 to 2015.

Xfm has held 28-day restricted service licence FM broadcasts in a number of British cities, including Manchester, Birmingham, Cardiff and Glasgow.

In 2000, Xfm London was added to a number of DAB multiplexes around the country, and in January 2006 its reach expanded when it replaced The Storm on a number of other local multiplexes, creating near-national coverage. It was at one point reported that this "national" version of Xfm London (known as Xfm UK) would have local content drop-ins within it (e.g. news, travel) over time, but this ultimately never came to pass. Most DAB coverage of Xfm carried the London version of the station, but for a time some multiplexes in the north of England instead received a feed of Xfm Manchester.

In 2001, Xfm rehired Ricky Gervais and Steve Merchant to run the Saturday afternoon show. Karl Pilkington was assigned to them as a producer, to "just push the buttons", but eventually became the focal point of the show.

By 2002, the station had added many specialist shows, such as London Express, The A-X of Alternative Music presented by Steve Taylor and generating a book published in 2004, and The Remix. Although the daytime playlist consisted of forty current releases, these were changed frequently, and the overall playlist contained about ninety records. In time the specialist shows gradually declined in number, and the playlist was again restricted.

On 9 June 2005, the group was awarded a permanent FM broadcasting licence to serve the city of Manchester as Xfm Manchester. This station went on air in March 2006. Also in 2005, Xfm was among the bidders for the regional north east franchise on 97.5 FM, but this licence was ultimately awarded to Smooth Radio by Ofcom.

On 4 January 2006, GCap Media relaunched its Central Scotland regional station Beat 106 as Xfm Scotland.

In 2007, a fourth station joined the network with the launch of a new regional Xfm for south Wales, based at the Cardiff studios of Red Dragon FM (now Capital South Wales).

=== Output changes ===
In May 2007, in an attempt to cut costs, the parent company of Xfm, GCap Media, announced that they would be removing all presenters from the daytime (10 am–4 pm) lineup and replacing them with a jukebox based upon listener requests through their websites. On 6 March 2008 an announcement was made reversing the decision to remove daytime presenters. From 25 March 2008 a new schedule restoring daytime schedules was put in place.

On 11 February 2008 GCap Media announced that they would be selling the analogue licence for the Manchester, Scotland and South Wales stations, retaining only XFM London. This decision was made in an attempt to shore up profits and concentrate on 'winning brands', calling the former nationalisation strategy into question. After this announcement, in early 2008, breakfast show host Alex Zane admitted on air that the future of the London station was also being reviewed, even making jokey references to perhaps being out of a job soon. The sale of the South Wales station went ahead, with Town and Country Broadcasting relaunching this as Nation Radio; the sale of the Scotland and Manchester stations was suspended when Global Radio entered into discussions to purchase GCap Media.

The re-appointment of a previous Programme Controller in 2011 led to a number of changes to Xfm's output. Specialist shows such as Music:Response and Mix Master Mike Show returned, as did presenter Danny Wallace. In September 2011 a new Xfm schedule began, and included Mary Anne Hobbs moving to a re-launched evening show, Music:Response. A new "local" slot was introduced. Broadcaster Richard Skinner left the station after two years. The show Import:Export, produced and directed by Redefined Media, was resurrected and linked to KROQ-FM Los Angeles. Further weekend signings included The Sun journalist Gordon Smart starting a three-hour Sunday show. Smart's show ended in October 2013 when he left to join the Scottish Sun as editor. As part of the 2013 schedule Jon Holmes took over the breakfast show. Comedian Josh Widdicombe presented a show on Saturdays between 10 am and 1 pm with Lliana Bird on afternoons. It was announced in March 2015 that Russell Brand would be hosting a new Sunday night show, which was to first air on 15 March.

Following Heart and Galaxy owner Global's takeover of GCap Media, Xfm Scotland became Galaxy (it went on to become Capital Scotland in 2011), leaving just Manchester and London with local Xfm stations.

Following Global's acquisition of Real and Smooth Ltd, the Paisley/Renfrewshire 96.3 FM service previously broadcast as Real Radio XS became a new XFM Scotland in 2014. This service was available across central Scotland over DAB.

Up until the end of the Xfm branding, the London, Manchester and Scotland stations broadcast 43 hours a week of local programming – weekday breakfast and drive, and four hours a day at weekends – with networked programming, primarily from London, at other times. TV platforms followed the London output and all three stations were streamed online.

=== Rebrand as Radio X ===
Xfm rebranded as Radio X on 21 September 2015. The rebrand was carried out in partnership with creative agency We Are MBC. The rebranded station launched with new presenters including Chris Moyles, Vernon Kay, Johnny Vaughan and Ricky Wilson joining some existing XFM presenters on a refreshed schedule.

Xfm aired its last day of programming on Sunday 13 September 2015, with Lliana Bird playing out the final song 'Kick Out The Jams' by MC5 and bidding an emotional farewell to the station. Musicians, listeners and Xfm DJs were invited to share their memories of the station using #wewerexfm. Xfm Scotland ceased broadcasting entirely on the same day, with Global handing back the Paisley licence to Ofcom. A "holding" service of music and announcements began transmitting on national DAB under the Radio X title the following day, with this service also taking the place of Xfm on FM, TV and online until the full launch of the new Radio X at 6:30 am on Monday 21 September 2015.

The first song played on the rebranded Radio X, by Chris Moyles just before 7 am on 21 September, was "Love Machine" by Girls Aloud, an off-format nod to media reports of a male bias by the new station.

Radio X is now available nationally via Digital One national DAB, with all local-layer Xfm carriage dropped (replaced in many cases by Gold). The new national Radio X also replaced Xfm on FM in London and Manchester, and on other platforms including TV and online. There is no longer any local output on the Manchester station, and the only variance between the UK, London and Manchester services is split advertising and top-of-the-hour news intros.

In October 2019, Radio X's DAB station switched to DAB+ using a more efficient 40 kbps AAC+ stream. This enabled it to broadcast nationally in stereo on DAB for the first time; the previous DAB broadcast used the less efficient MP2 coding, so although a higher bitrate (80 kbps), it was broadcast in mono. The change was made to make room for LBC News on the Digital One multiplex.

During the 2010s, the station progressively included more "classic" records in its output. By 2021, with the exception of John Kennedy's X-Posure (airing Friday and Saturday, in addition to X-Posure Daily on Global Player), only about twelve recent releases would be playlisted in any one week.

== Sister stations ==
=== Radio X Classic Rock ===
On 16 February 2023, Global launched Radio X Classic Rock to play classic rock music, broadcast on DAB nationwide and online. The move reinstated an adult rock service into Global's portfolio three years after the demise of The Arrow. Radio X Classic Rock has a dedicated weekday daytime show, usually presented by Sunta Templeton of The Johnny Vaughan 4 'til 7 Thang.

=== Radio X Chilled ===
Launched on 12 September 2024 alongside Radio X 90s and Radio X 00s, Radio X Chilled broadcasts exclusively chill-out alternative music. It is available on DAB in London.

=== Radio X 90s ===
Launched on 12 September 2024 alongside Radio X 00s and Radio X Chilled, Radio X 90s plays the alternative rock from the 1990s. Radio X 90s broadcasts across the UK on Global Player, and is also available in London on DAB. and it has also been broadcasting on 106.1 FM and DAB in Manchester from 24 February 2025, replacing XS Manchester. Rob Ellis, formerly of Capital Manchester and Lancashire, presents a show as part of the schedule from 11am to 2pm every weekday.

=== Radio X 00s ===
Launched on 12 September 2024 alongside Radio X 90s and Radio X Chilled, Radio X 00s plays the alternative rock from the 2000s. It is available on DAB in London.

=== Radio X Oasis ===
On 15 April 2025, Radio X launched their first ever pop-up station dedicated to English rock band Oasis to coincide with the UK leg of their reunion tour, which featured the whole song catalogs (including B-sides and rarities) along with the specialized programming. The pop-up station ends the run on September following their encore run at the Wembley Stadium. As of most recent, the pop-up station are currently occupied by Heart Xmas, awhile Radio X Oasis will getting special pop-up takeover on sister station Radio X 90s during the premiere week for Oasis: Don't Look Back in Anger documentary on Disney+.

== Former Xfm stations ==
The stations which formerly comprised the Xfm network were:

- Xfm London, which has been broadcasting on 104.9 FM in the Greater London area full-time since 1997 (and by restricted service licence from 1992).
- XFM Manchester, which was launched on 97.7 FM on 15 March 2006.
- XFM Scotland

== Current and former presenters ==
Current presenters on the network include:

- Chris Moyles
- Dominic Byrne (co-hosting Chris Moyles)
- Toby Tarrant
- Issy Panayis
- Johnny Vaughan (also host The Kickabout on Saturdays)
- Sunta Templeton (co-hosting Johnny Vaughan; also on Radio X Classic Rock)
- Dan O'Connell
- Rich Wolfenden (Indie Night on weekends)
- John Kennedy (for X-Posure)
- Danny Wallace
- Polly James
- Dan Gasser
- Adam Brown (Early mornings)
- Steve Jones

Former presenters on the network include:

- David Arnoff
- Ricky Gervais
- Stephen Merchant
- Karl Pilkington
- Russell Brand
- Zane Lowe
- Dave Rowntree, whose final show was on 13 September 2015.
- Dermot O'Leary
- Adam and Joe
- Shaun Keaveny
- Claire Sturgess
- Zoe Ball
- Pete Mitchell
- Eddy Temple-Morris, host of The Remix, whose final show after 15 years on Xfm was on 4 September 2015. He took The Remix to Soho Radio.
- Josh Widdicombe, who alternated on Saturday and Sunday mornings from February 2013 until July 2015.
- Iain Baker, who worked at Xfm for seven years presenting a number of different shows
- Alex Zane
- Christian O'Connell
- Jane Gazzo
- Dave Berry
- Lauren Laverne
- Eoghan McDermott, now on RTÉ Radio.
- Scroobius Pip, who presented The Beatdown, a late-night spoken-word and hip-hop show, from April 2013 to August 2014
- Jon Holmes (2013–2016)
- Phil Clifton
- Ricky Wilson
- Vernon Kay (2015–2017)
- Clint Boon
- Jo Good
- Mary Anne Hobbs
- Janice Long
- Richard Skinner
- Kevin Greening
- Alan Freeman
- Elis James
- John Robins
- Jimmy Hill
- Gordon Smart
- Liam Gallagher
- Noel Gallagher
- Lliana Bird, the longest standing female DJ on the station (16 years)
- Steve Taylor, author of The A to X of Alternative Music
- Robin Banks
- Pippa Taylor, now on parent station Heart

== Kick Out the Jams: The Story of XFM ==
In 2022, Signature Entertainment released Kick Out the Jams: The Story of XFM, a documentary by The Wee Man's Ray Burdis co-directed with Ian Jefferies, about the history of Xfm. The film features interviews with former Xfm presenters like Gary Crowley, Ricky Gervais, Steve Lamacq, Stephen Merchant, Claire Sturgess, John Kennedy and Steve Taylor as well as musicians like The Libertines' Pete Doherty and Carl Barat, Alan McGee and Sonya Madan.

== See also ==
- The Music Machine - formerly NME Radio, founded by XFM's Sammy Jacob
