= Ralph Bernard =

British radio executive

Ralph Mitchell Bernard CBE (born 11 February 1953) is a British journalist, and a former chief executive of commercial radio group GCap Media.

== Early life ==
He attended Caterham High School in north-east London.

== Career ==
He started his career as a journalist at Sheffield's Radio Hallam in 1975, before moving to Hereward Radio in Peterborough.

In 1982 he moved south to launch Wiltshire Radio as programme director, becoming managing director in 1983. From here, he helped develop the GWR radio group which later merged with Capital Radio to form the biggest commercial radio company in the UK, GCap Media. He was chief executive of GWR Group PLC between 1987 and 2001, when he was appointed Executive Chairman. GCap Media's portfolio includes Classic FM and London's Capital Radio.

He was appointed a Fellow of The Radio Academy in 1998. He won the Sony Gold Award in 2000 for his contribution to the radio industry, and was appointed a CBE for his services to broadcasting in 2002. He left GCap in March 2008 to be replaced by Fru Hazlitt.

He is chair of the Broadcast Journalism Training Council (BJTC), a partnership between the major broadcasters, the National Union of Journalists (NUJ) and academics who teach broadcast and multimedia journalism.

== Personal life ==
He is married with four children and lives in Wiltshire. He was awarded the CBE in the 2002 Birthday Honours.

Business positions
Preceded by	Chairman of Classic FM; 2007 - 2012	Succeeded by
Preceded by	Chief Executive of GCap Media; 2005 - 2007	Succeeded by
Preceded by	Chief Executive of Classic FM; 1997 - 2005	Succeeded by
Preceded by	Executive Chairman of GWR Group; 2001 - 2005	Succeeded by
Preceded by	Chief Executive of GWR Group; 1985 - 2001	Succeeded by
