= Heart Bedford =

Coordinates: 52.1253°N 0.4223°W

Bedford; England
- Broadcast area: Bedford
- Frequencies: FM: 96.9 MHz; RDS: Heart_BD

Programming
- Format: Hot AC

History
- First air date: 1 June 1982

Heart Bedford (formerly Chiltern Radio 96.9) was an Independent Local Radio station based in the Priory Business Park in Bedford, Bedfordshire in England.

== History ==
Together with sister stations 97.6 Chiltern FM, Northants 96 and Horizon Radio, it formed the Chiltern Radio Network, which became the Chiltern Radio Group. The station briefly changed its name to B97 FM in 1996 when GWR bought the station. The station changed back to Chiltern FM in 1999. Now part of the Global Radio portfolio, after GCap Media failed to stop the buyout, the station was rebranded as Heart Bedford on 5 January 2009, becoming a part of the Heart Network.

== Network restructuring ==
On 21 June 2010, Global Radio announced plans to close Heart Bedford and merge the station with Heart Milton Keynes, Heart Dunstable and Heart Northants as part of plans to reduce the Heart network of stations from 33 to 16. The new station, Heart Home Counties, began broadcasting from Dunstable on 16 July 2010.
