= Heart Ipswich =

Ipswich & Bury St Edmunds; England
- Broadcast area: Suffolk & King's Lynn
- Frequencies: 96.4 & 97.1 MHz

Programming
- Format: Hot AC

Ownership
- Owner: Heart Network, Global Radio

History
- First air date: 28 October 1975
- Last air date: 3 September 2010

Heart Ipswich (formerly SGR FM) was an Independent Local Radio station that evolved from Suffolk Group Radio, which was the parent company for two Independent radio stations serving the county of Suffolk in England.

== Overview ==
The older of the radio stations was Radio Orwell, which began transmissions in Ipswich on 28 October 1975 on 257m MW. It was one of the original group of ILR stations set up by the Independent Broadcasting Authority following relaxation of the rules governing broadcasting in Britain. Other stations that were included in the original 19 were LBC and Capital Radio in London and BRMB in Birmingham.

The western side of Suffolk got its own radio station in the form of Saxon Radio on 240m MW, which began broadcasting in Bury St Edmunds in November 1982. The two stations operated separate breakfast shows, and then programmes were networked from either site to both transmitters. Most of the programmes came from the studios at Electric House, Ipswich, and a few from the Bury St Edmunds' Long Brackland studios.

In 1984-85, the stations experimented with a drive-time news and current affairs programme ("The Home Run") which had presenters in both studios - Allan Lee in Ipswich and Adrienne Rosen in Bury. This proved too expensive to continue for long and the programme was cut back to one presenter in the Ipswich studio.

Ipswich Town FC was sponsored by Radio Orwell and had the station's logo on the front of the team's shirts in the mid-1980s.

The Radio Orwell logo

In 1990, the stations were taken over by the successful Norwich-based Radio Broadland to form the East Anglian Radio group, run by the Broadland management team. EAR re-launched Orwell and Saxon as one station under the SGR-FM banner in 1992 and also won the licence to start SGR Colchester in Essex the following year. The group launched a new service in 1995 called Amber Radio, with studios in Ipswich and Norwich, on the AM transmitters previously used to simulcast the SGR stations; these, some years later, became Classic Gold Amber and then Gold. In 1996, EAR was bought by the GWR Group network, which continued to run the stations for about 10 years until it was taken over by Global Radio.

=== Heart rebrand ===
On 5 January 2009, SGR-FM was renamed as Heart, as part of a major re-brand involving 29 One Network stations. By that time, local programming was restricted to daily breakfast and weekday afternoon drivetime shows with all other output networked from London. As part of the re-brand, the station pulled out of a contract to broadcast live commentary on Ipswich Town FC games after just one season.

=== Network restructuring ===
On 21 June 2010, Global Radio announced plans to close Heart Ipswich and merge the station with Heart Norwich as part of plans to reduce the Heart network of stations from 33 to 16. The new station, Heart East Anglia, began broadcasting from Norwich on 3 September 2010.

== See also ==
- 96.1 Heart Colchester
- Global Radio
- The One Network
