= Heart Colchester =

Colchester; England
- Broadcast area: Colchester and surrounding areas
- Frequencies: FM: 96.1 MHz; RDS: Heart___

Programming
- Format: Hot AC

Ownership
- Owner: Heart Network, Global Radio

History
- First air date: 17 October 1993
- Last air date: 3 September 2010

Links
- Website: Heart Colchester

Heart Colchester (formerly SGR Colchester) was an Independent Local Radio station broadcasting to Colchester and the surrounding areas. The station was launched in 1993 as SGR Colchester by the East Anglian Radio group, which also operated the Ipswich-based SGR-FM, Radio Broadland in Norwich, and Amber Radio across Suffolk and Norfolk.

== History ==
The station, serving a population of around 150,000, broadcast programmes from its studios in the town during daytime (6am - 6pm) but shared output from its larger sister SGR station in Ipswich at other times. The Colchester station was an immediate success and quickly built an impressive audience locally, soon establishing itself as market leader. Staff in the early years included Mike Stewart (group programme director), Danny Cox (station manager) and presenters Nick Jackson and Simon Taylor.

It became part of the GWR Group when East Anglian Radio was taken over in 1996. In January 2009, owners Global Radio re-branded SGR Colchester as Heart Colchester and the following year, it was merged with Heart Essex, resulting in the closure of the station's studio base in the town.

== See also ==
- Heart Ipswich
- Global Radio
