= Emperor Rosko =

American DJ (born 1942)

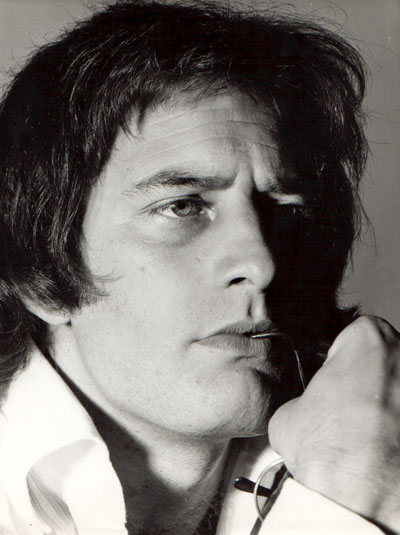
- Emperor Rosko early in his career
- Born: Michael Joseph Pasternak; 26 December 1942 (age 83); Los Angeles, California, United States
- Other names: Emperor Rosko; Michael Prescott
- Occupations: Radio personality Disc jockey
- Years active: c. 1960 – present
- Known for: Fast-paced US-style rock show
- Parent(s): Joe Pasternak; Dorothy Darrel
- Website: www.emperorrosko.com

Michael Joseph Pasternak (born 26 December 1942), known by his stage name Emperor Rosko, is an American presenter of rock music programmes, most widely known for his shows on Radio Caroline and BBC Radio 1 in the UK in the 1960s and early 1970s.

== Early life ==
Born in Los Angeles, California, he is the son of Hollywood film producer Joe Pasternak. He was influenced in his career choice by Los Angeles disc jockeys Lord Tim Hudson at KFWB and Wolfman Jack at XERB the Mighty 1090 (Rosarito Beach MX). Pasternak's opportunity to broadcast came when he was in the US Navy, where he presented a show on the aircraft carrier USS Coral Sea, using the name Michael Prescott. He then moved to Europe and hosted sponsored programmes in France and Andorra.

== Origin of stage name ==
In an interview with Chris Edwards, for Offshore Echoes, Rosko explained: "I used to listen to a guy named Roscoe, who used to listen to a guy called Boscoe and the double-syllable name ending in "o" was synonymous with rhythm and rhyme which was a precursor to rap. I also used to listen to several other people like Wolfman, Tom Donahue, etc. So I took a little bit of everybody and became Emperor Rosko to distinguish myself from all the others."

== Offshore radio ==
He joined Radio Caroline, a pirate radio station broadcasting from a ship off the coast of Britain, in April 1966. There, his American-influenced fast-paced presentation style soon made him one of the station's best-loved DJs. He was often joined on air by his mynah bird Alfie. After his time at Radio Caroline, speaking fluent French, he presented for French-language stations Radio Monte Carlo and Radio Luxembourg as "Le Président Rosko".

Rosko compered the Stax/Volt Tour of Europe in 1967 and can be heard introducing Booker T. & the M.G.'s, the Bar-Kays, Carla Thomas, Eddie Floyd, Sam & Dave, and Otis Redding on the two-album set The Stax/Volt Tour in London, recorded at the Finsbury Park Astoria (later the Rainbow Theatre) on 17 March 1967. It is Rosko who can be heard introducing Redding and encouraging the crowd to chant and spell his name on Redding's album Live in Europe, recorded on 17 March and 21 March 1967.

=== Return to Radio Caroline ===
In January 2023, it was announced that Rosko was to re-join Radio Caroline. In a statement on their website the station stated that Rosko would present monthly breakfast shows under the Radio Caroline North link-up with Manx Radio.

== BBC career ==
As a disc jockey with BBC Radio 1 at its launch in September 1967, Rosko initially recorded shows in France for the Midday Spin programme. On his first Midday Spin show, Rosko introduced himself with "I am the Emperor, the geeter with the heater, your leader, your groovy host from the West Coast, here to clear up your skin and mess up your mind. It'll make you feel good all over." He highlighted the new Motown, reggae and rock music.

Rosko moved to the UK in 1968 and from 1970 presented Radio 1's Friday Roundtable, in which new records were reviewed by a panel of guests. He also presented in a Saturday lunchtime slot. Together with fellow Radio 1 DJ Dave Lee Travis, he launched the first mobile discothèque, the "Rosko International Roadshow". He stayed with Radio 1 until September 1976, when he left for America to rejoin his father, who was suffering from Parkinson's disease. Around 1975, he briefly hosted Crackerjack on BBC Television with Little & Large. During that year he also presented a few editions of Top of the Pops, including the edition broadcast on 10 April.

When Rosko returned to Europe, he was heard via recorded shows on Radio Luxembourg. In 1981 he returned to Radio 1 for a 13-week Sunday series of shows, and continued to broadcast at weekends during the Summer for four years. In 1988, he returned to Radio 1 to help celebrate the 21st birthday of the station. In 1992, he helped celebrate the station's 25th birthday with a special broadcast, before joining Virgin Radio 1215 in April 1993.

== Since 2000 ==
From October 2001, Rosko was heard on the now defunct Classic Gold Digital, and REM.FM, his programme being recorded in California. He also ran his own soul station "Rosko Radio" for Internet broadcaster Live365, which aired its final broadcasts in December 2007. There was no sponsor and the free distribution was challenged by the societies of authors and composers in the US based on complaints of unfair competition for FM radio. The service continued in podcast form.

He also broadcasts a programme called "The LA Connection" from his studios in California, which in 2012 could be heard in the UK on 96.5 Bolton FM, Classic Hits Forest Gold, Radio Scarborough, Zack FM 105.3 in East Anglia, Forest FM 92.3 in Verwood, Dorset, Vixen 101 in East Yorkshire, Belfast 89 and across Europe on several stations including Central FM in southern Spain, and Radio Ayia Napa in Cyprus.

On 11 April 2009, Rosko presented a three-hour show within a BBC-sponsored commemorative broadcast from the lightship LV18 berthed at Harwich. Since then, Rosko has been heard regularly on the internet broadcaster Big L International.

On 14 August 2017, Emperor Rosko made a special guest broadcast on Radio Caroline to mark the 50th anniversary of the Marine, &c., Broadcasting (Offences) Act 1967.

In 2018, Rosko joined the line-up for the United DJs DAB and online radio station.

In August of 2023 he was to be heard on Alderney's QUAY-FM.

On 28 March 2024, he broadcast on Boom Radio to celebrate the 60th anniversary of the launch of Radio Caroline. He is now on KFM Radio online Saturday 10am-12 noon.

== Film ==
Rosko has a small part in the 1972 film Ciao! Manhattan. He appears as himself in the 1975 film Slade in Flame.

Rosko was the inspiration for the Philip Seymour Hoffman character "The Count" in the 2009 comedy film The Boat That Rocked, known as Pirate Radio in the United States.

== Singles discography ==
Year	Title	Label
1969	"Opposite Lock"	Polydor – 56316
1970	"Al Capone"	Trojan - TR7758
1970	"Grabbit The Rabbit"	Philips - 6009070
1971	"Customs Man's Suspicious"	Philips - 6009126
1975	"Al Capone" [reissue]	Trojan - TR7949
1979	"Al Capone" [2nd reissue]	Trojan - TRO9059

== Awards ==
- 2008 – at a lunch in December, inducted into the Radio Academy Hall of Fame
- 2011 – Lifetime Achievement Award at the International Radio Festival in Zürich.

== Publications ==
His book Emperor Rosko's DJ Book was published by Everest in March 1976 (ISBN 0903925923). It was re-published, with additional material, as an eBook in October 2012.
