= Central FM (Spanish radio station) =

Radio station in Spain

Central FM is an English commercial radio station broadcasting in Southern Spain. There are other English stations broadcasting over a similar area on the Costa del Sol.

== Current Presenters ==
- Tony Keys
- Nataly Garcia
- Andy Little
- Lynn Halliday
- Sean Swaby
- Mike Whittingham
- Geoff Jameson
- Paul Breen Turner
- Cath John
- Baz Williamson
- Dave Englefield
- Spencer James
