= Broadcast Journalism Training Council =

The Broadcast Journalism Training Council (BJTC) is an industry-led body offering accreditation to courses for aspiring journalists.

== History ==
In the late 1970s, the National Union of Journalists was pushing for a more structured approach to training for broadcast. After a series of meetings with universities, the BBC and the Independent Broadcasting Authority, the Joint Advisory Council for the Training of Radio Journalists was formed, chaired by the retired managing director of BBC World Service, Gerard Mansell.

This organisation was the forerunner of the BJTC. In 1987, Tom Beesley succeeded Mansell as chair. He continued for 23 years, before retiring in 2010. Other past chairmen have been Marie Kinsey from the University of Sheffield and Martin Campbell, former Ofcom chief advisory. Currently the BJTC is chaired by Ralph Bernard, with Jon Godel as its chief executive.

It was founded on 25 November 1996.

== Purpose ==
The BJTC is a partnership of 90 per cent of UK broadcasting employers: the BBC, ITV News Group, ITN, Sky News, Thomson-Reuters, RadioCentre, APTN, plus the NUJ and Creative Skillset, the sector Skills Council for the media industries. Associate members include 37 colleges and universities, running a total of 56 accredited courses. The aim of the BJTC is to make students more employable, so the primary role is as a forum for employers and training providers to agree training standards.

Recently the BJTC has reviewed and updated its Requirements in accordance and consultation with industry and academic personnel. These were published to all accredited courses in December 2015.

The BJTC hold biannual conferences for Council members, allowing them to get up-to-date news from the BJTC and partake in debates, talks and workshops including voice training, mobile, social media and drone journalism.

== Awards ==
The BJTC also runs a successful annual awards programme. In 2016, the ceremony was held at ITV Southbank studios, hosted by Charlene White with students from City, University of London winning the top Steve Harris Award for Best Original Journalism. Past presenters have included Alastair Stewart, Nina Hossain, Neila Butt (BBC Diversity Editor), Dominic Laurie and Chris Mason (BBC Political Correspondent).

== Structure ==
It is headquartered in Gerrards Cross in Buckinghamshire, near Gerrards Cross railway station, between the B416 and A413.

== See also ==
- National Council for the Training of Journalists, for newspaper journalists, based in Essex
