= Sandy Warr =

British radio presenter and newsreader

Sandy Warr is a British radio news presenter and academic. She presents on LBC News on Sundays and teaches at City St George’s University of London.

== Education ==
Warr studied English Language and Literature at the University of Hull, graduating in 1983. Immediately following this, she began studying for a Diploma in broadcast journalism at the University of Central Lancashire;she then completed a Masters Degree in Mass Communication research at Leicester.

== Career ==
Warr's career began at Radio Mercury in Sussex and Surrey in 1984.

From 1984 to 1988, she was the News Editor at BBC Radio Bedfordshire, Hertfordshire and Buckinghamshire, which is now known as BBC Three Counties Radio and BBC 3CR. She was Chris Tarrant’s newsreader at Capital Radio and Presented the Award winning The Way It Is and the Capital Doctor phone in before leaving to joint GLR

In 1992, she played a fictional newsreader in the 2-episode TV series The Guilty, which starred, among others, Michael Kitchen.

As of 1995, Warr was presenting sports programmes at BBC Radio 5 Live. She presented a programme focused on skiing, Off Piste, which was broadcast every Friday evening. As of the same year, she was also a sports commentator at the station, and was given the Rose Harris Award for her services to netball. Also as of the same year, Warr was presenting a weekday early breakfast programme on Talk Radio UK, between 6 and 7 am. As of 1996, Warr was presenting the show from 5am until 7am, alongside Chris Ashley.

In 1998, she completed a master's degree in mass communication research at the University of Leicester. In the same year, Warr joined City, University of London to teach about topics relating to radio production, radio journalism and radio presenting; she is currently a senior lecturer in journalism at City, University of London.

From 2001 until 2006, Warr was a visiting lecturer at the University of Westminster.

As of 2002, she was presenting the drivetime show on LBC. During Warr's time at the station, she appeared on at least one occasion as a panelist on an ITN television programme. From 2006 to 2007, Warr was a programme presenter and news presenter at BBC Radio Berkshire. As of 2008, she was presenting on Smooth Radio in the UK.

In 2015, she co-presented a podcast for The Guardian, analysing the events of the Rugby World Cup of that year.

From 2012 until 2020, Warr presented the news on Talksport. She was also heard on talkSPORT's sister station Talkradio, after the station launched in 2016. In 2016, she stormed off an edition of the Alan Brazil Breakfast Show on talkSPORT after Brazil accused her of showing a political bias during an on-air conversation. Complaints were made to OFCOM in relation the incident, but no action was taken by the regulator against Brazil. As of 2018, Warr presented the news on the Magic family of stations as well as on talkRADIO.

By 2023, Warr had pioneered the first MA in Podcasting in the UK; the qualification began to be taught in that year. She was involved in finding funding for bursaries for the MA.

Warr presents on Sundays on LBC News, a radio station delivering rolling summaries of the latest news, business news, entertainment news, sports news, and other news.

Warr has won awards for her radio work, and is a Fellow of the Radio Academy.

Warr has also worked as a network presenter at the Classic Gold Digital Network, also presented "The Way It Is" news programme on Capital Radio and worked at Absolute Radio.

== Personal life ==
Warr has run the London Marathon, and in 2008 she was interviewed by The Guardian about taking part in the MoonWalk, a charity fundraising event which involves power-walking, in Hyde Park in London. She is a passionate supporter of AFC Wimbledon
