= Tony Gillham =

British radio presenter

Tony Gillham is a British radio presenter.

== Career ==
Gillham first became a radio presenter in the 1960s.

Gillham's first daily radio show was on a radio station based in a factory that made biscuits. He then presented on Radio Tees, followed by other commercial radio stations.

In the 1980s, Gillham presented the early breakfast show on BBC Radio 2.

In early 2007, Gillham was presenting "Gillham Gold" on BBC Radio Cambridgeshire on Saturdays; he was also presenting on BBC Radio Berkshire, BBC Somerset Sound, BBC Radio Oxford and BBC Radio Devon. Also in early 2007, Gillham was asked by his local authority to take down a 40-foot radio mast from his home's garden which he had put up without planning permission.

Gillham presented a Monday afternoon programme on BBC Radio Cambridgeshire in 2012.

Gillham founded Black Cat Radio, a community radio station in St Neots, Cambridgeshire, which received its licence to broadcast on FM in 2015. Prior to this, the station had broadcast on a restricted service licence (RSL) on FM for a restricted time period.

Gillham presented a weekday programme on BBC Radio Jersey in the 2000s and 2010s.

Until 2019, Gillham presented a weekend programme featuring older pop music on BBC Radio Oxford, BBC Radio Jersey and BBC Radio Guernsey. From 2019 to 2022, he presented a weekend programme on BBC Radio Jersey and BBC Radio Guernsey.

Gillham's current radio presenting roles include presenting on 45 Radio, a pop-music radio station which broadcasts across the UK, and on Black Cat Radio on Sundays. For his work on Black Cat Radio, Gillham won "Sage Person of the Year" at the 2024 Community Radio Awards.
