= Paul Burnett =

English radio disc jockey (born 1943)

- Born: 26 November 1943 (age 82); Hulme, Manchester, England

Paul Burnett (born 26 November 1943) is an English radio disc jockey.

== Early career ==
Burnett began his radio career while in the Royal Air Force in the Persian Gulf in 1964. In 1966 he joined offshore radio station, Radio 270, broadcasting off Scarborough, North Yorkshire. After the banning of the offshore stations he moved in 1967 to Manx Radio on the Isle of Man, but he soon joined Radio Luxembourg, where he hosted the chart show. Here Burnett discovered many recordings, previously thought lost, of propaganda broadcasts by William Joyce ("Lord Haw Haw") to Britain, made from the Luxembourg stations during the Nazi occupation. On Luxembourg, he presented the Saturday Top 20 show from 1967 to 1974.

On 24 March 1974 Burnett joined BBC Radio 1 hosting a Sunday morning show All There Is To Hear (a radio one airplay chart show) and also hosted the station's national Top 20 show, broadcast on Sunday evenings between 6 and 7pm whilst Tom Browne, the main presenter of the show at the time, was absent. The first record he ever played on the station was Seven Seas Of Rhye by the group Queen. In 1976, an on-air parody of the U.S. hit single "Convoy", became "Convoy GB" (by Laurie Lingo & The Dipsticks), which led to a release of the song as a single along with fellow DJ Dave Lee Travis. The song reached number four in the UK Singles Chart, and Burnett appeared dressed as a chicken on Top of the Pops.

From 5 July 1976 Burnett hosted the weekday lunchtime show after Johnnie Walker left the station. Here Burnett had the responsibility of revealing the new singles chart every Tuesday lunchtime on 247 metres Medium Wave as the chart positions were received by the British Market Research Bureau. His popular show included several features such as Pub of the Day, Fun at One and Is, Was, Should Have. Burnett became a regular presenter of Top of the Pops, and presented the Radio 1 Roadshow during the summer. In 1981 he moved from lunchtimes to later in the afternoons, but his daily show ended in 1982 to allow Steve Wright's show to be extended. He was then briefly heard on Saturday mornings from 10am–1pm.

During 1982–84, Burnett was heard on BBC Radio 2 as a stand-in host for broadcasters such as David Hamilton and Terry Wogan and occasionally presenting the Early Show. In 1978, Burnett co-hosted the Miss World contest broadcast on BBC1.

== From 1985 ==
Between 1985 and 1987, he moved to Pennine Radio (now Hits Radio West Yorkshire) in Bradford, Southern Sound (now Heart Sussex) in Sussex, and Capital Radio, where he deputised for Alan Freeman on Pick of the Pops Take Two in February 1988. In October 1985, billed as the 'Pee Bee Squad' he reached #52 in the United Kingdom chart with "Rugged and Mean, Butch and on Screen".

In 1988 Capital split its frequencies and he joined Capital Gold where he presented a daytime Vintage Chart programme (Monday–Friday at 1 pm), playing charts from 1956 to 1972. He also did a Sunday afternoon show on Capital Gold (2–5pm). This featured an hour of listeners' requests. He featured a Vintage Top 30 in the final couple of hours, playing complete top 30s again from 1956 to 1972. He left Capital Gold around 1994 and later worked for Classic Gold for a couple of years in the late 1990s.

Burnett replaced Jimmy Savile as the long-time host of The Vintage Chart Show on the BBC World Service (1989–1999).

== Since 2000 ==
Burnett returned to Classic Gold around 2000, where he presented at lunchtimes and early afternoons. He left the station when it merged with Capital Gold to form the new Gold network in August 2007.

On 9 November 2007 Burnett broadcast with Dave Lee Travis on KCFM from Hull, and on 16 November 2007 he did the show as their 'Live Legend' of radio. For the following four weeks he had a three-hour weekly spot on the station - 'Burnett Live' - which broadcast live late on Friday evenings. Tony Blackburn replaced Burnett in this slot in January 2008.

Burnett could be heard presenting weekdays between 5 and 7 (9 February – September 2009) on internet radio station Wight FM (this was voicetracked). He could be heard on KCFM (Hull) on Sunday afternoons between 12 and 3 between Summer 2009-Summer 2010. On Saturday 16 October 2010, he stood in for Dave Cash on BBC Radio Kent, Sussex, Surrey, Solent, Oxford and Berkshire presenting a classic chart show featuring top 40 sounds from 1971 and 1981. He also did a Christmas Eve show on Time106.6 in 2010, and another on Monday 27 December at 10 am. He could be heard occasionally on The Vintage Top 40 Show on various BBC Local Stations on Sundays at 5 pm.

Since December 2023 Burnett has been broadcasting bank holiday and festive specials on Boom Radio.
