= Capital Gold =

Radio network in London, England

- Original Capital Gold logo
- Type: Classic hits
- Country: England
- First air date: 2 July 1988
- Headquarters: London
- Language: English
- Replaced: 3 August 2007
- Replaced by: Gold

The Capital Gold radio station started in London in 1988 on Capital Radio's AM frequency, after the Independent Broadcasting Authority had urged stations to end simulcasting (broadcasting the same programmes simultaneously on AM and FM) and threatened to remove one of their frequencies if simulcasting continued. The original DJs on the early incarnation of Capital Gold included Tony Blackburn, Kenny Everett and David Hamilton. The hiring of radio personalities to host networked shows continued to be a feature of the Capital Gold network as it grew.

== History ==
As required by the forthcoming Broadcasting Act, in 1987 the IBA and the Home Office ruled that all ILR stations were to permanently split their AM and FM frequencies (instead of simulcasting the same service) in order to create new local radio stations and improve choice. In 1986 Capital Radio had experimented with split contemporary formats at weekends, but now responded by launching a "golden oldies" station on its AM frequency, 1548 AM Capital Gold. The station launched on 2 July 1988 as a weekend-only service and went full time on 1 November 1988, while on that date Capital on FM became 95.8 Capital FM, a chart contemporary music station. Both stations received brand-new jingle packages from Muff Murfin and TM Productions in Dallas. These were later followed up by new packages from Californian jingle house Who Did That Music (later Groove Addicts).

Capital Gold featured a strong presenting lineup such as Tony Blackburn, who joined from BBC Radio London and launched the station, "Diddy" David Hamilton, Paul Burnett, Paul Gambaccini and Kenny Everett, who returned to daily broadcasting at Capital Gold, hosting daytime shows on weekdays until 1994, when his deteriorating health meant he was unable to continue. The mid-late 1990s saw Capital Gold rated London's most popular AM radio station and the third-most-popular music station, behind Capital FM and BBC Radio 1.

With Capital Gold proving popular with its London audience, the station management decided to syndicate Tony Blackburn's Sunday soul show and expand its popular 'Sportstime' brand to Birmingham station Xtra AM, which Capital had purchased in 1993 along with BRMB to form Capital Radio Group plc. This was followed in 1994 with the purchase of the Southern Radio Group.

Both Capital Radio plc and GWR Group lobbied the then Radio Authority to allow syndicated programmes to be broadcast on their AM stations. The Radio Authority agreed and it was announced early in 1998 that Capital Gold from London would replace Invicta Supergold; Xtra and South Coast followed on 1 June.

The networking was agreed by the Radio Authority with the stipulation that at least four hours a day of weekday broadcasting were kept and local news, traffic announcements and advertising remained on each station. Listeners to the previous local stations were dismayed that so much local broadcasting was to be eliminated, resulting in the loss of jobs. Capital Radio boss David Mansfield maintained that AM listenership had steadily declined and required a consistent, high-quality programme offering across all stations to remain competitive.

Initially, the four hours were scheduled in the afternoon drivetime slot (3 – 7 p.m.) with a networked breakfast/morning show hosted by comedian Mike Osman (7 – 11 a.m.). This surprised many people in the industry as this sidelined Capital Gold's biggest radio name at the time, Tony Blackburn, who had previously presented the weekday breakfast show to weekends. However, a few months later Blackburn was moved back on the weekday schedule in the afternoon drivetime slot, while local breakfast shows were reintroduced to meet the four-hour requirement. A new jingle package from now-defunct jingle company AJ Productions and a new slogan – "Great Time Music" heralded the major change.

In 1999, Capital Radio plc acquired Red Dragon FM and its medium wave service Touch Radio in South Wales, with the result being that Capital Gold replaced Touch Radio. 1999 saw the station's reach increase yet again: across the UK and Ireland on Sky.

In 2002, new logos and imaging re-launched the Capital Gold Network, with the new slogan, "The Greatest Hits of the 60s, 70s and 80s", and a further medium wave station in Manchester was added after the former Wireless Group agreed to sell Big 1458 AM's broadcasting licence.

== Sport ==
1988 also saw the launch of live, uninterrupted football coverage with a programme called Capital Gold Sportstime, presented by Jonathan Pearce, who was known for his loud, enthusiastic delivery. Prominent football clubs featured on the show included Crystal Palace, Arsenal, Tottenham Hotspur, Fulham, West Ham United, Queens Park Rangers, Chelsea, Charlton Athletic, and Wimbledon.

== Digital ==
In 1999, CE Digital – a consortium made up of Capital Radio plc and Emap Radio – won local DAB digital radio licences for Manchester, Birmingham and London. This was followed by similar wins by Capital Radio plc in Kent, Sussex and Hampshire. Capital Gold actively encouraged listeners to switch to DAB Digital Radio which offered stereo broadcasts for the first time in its history.

In a dispute with station bosses, Tony Blackburn left the station in 2002, having been at the station since Gold's launch in 1988. He hosted weekday drivetime and the Soul Spectrum until being replaced by Greg Edwards. Blackburn would later appear on the Classic Gold Digital Network, leaving when this was combined into Gold.

In 2004, station management decided to stop broadcasting live football coverage under the Capital Gold Sportstime title. Jonathan Pearce had moved to BBC Radio 5 Live, and the fees involved in acquiring live radio coverage rights had become too costly. A replacement sports show, Sports Saturday now covers sports results. A Saturday Football League preview magazine was briefly aired in 2004 but discontinued after a few months.

== Programming ==
Capital Gold played a range of music, from the 1960s, 1970s and 1980s, and added 1990s music and later. The station had a weekly playlist of new material, plus a "Rated And Recommended" list which was chosen by David Jensen. The station played classic hits and almost every song played was by a major artist.

On Saturday morning David Jensen hosted a celebrity and showbiz programme and recent notable guests have included Paul Weller, Jools Holland, Jeremy Irons, Smokey Robinson and Juliette Lewis. Every Friday, Saturday and Sunday evenings, Greg Edwards hosted a soul show called Soul Spectrum, the name taken from his Capital show in the 1970s. On Sunday mornings from 11:00, a chart rundown show called From the Bottom to the Top featured the top 20 tracks when the featured guest was riding high in the charts.

== Merger with Classic Gold ==
Following the 2004 merger of Capital Radio plc and GWR Group plc to form GCap Media in 2005, a review of station assets was carried out by Chief Executive Ralph Bernard. One of the aims for 2006 was that Capital Gold would be carried on a national digital multiplex – enabling near-nationwide coverage – by the merger between itself and digital-only station Capital Life. However, following GCap's purchase of the Classic Gold network in April 2007, the earlier plan was scrapped, and it was decided to merge the two networks to form the 'Gold Network', and this began at 7 p.m. on 3 August 2007.

== Compilation CDs ==
Capital Gold released a CD compilation early in 2001 called Capital Gold Legends, featuring artists such as Blondie, Queen and Tina Turner. This was followed in November 2001 by Capital Gold Legends Vol. 2 and in March 2002 by Volume 3, and in November 2002 by Sixties Legends, Seventies Legends and Eighties Legends.
