= Heart Peterborough =

Former radio station in Peterborough, England

Coordinates: 52.5746°N 0.2471°W

- Peterborough; England
- Broadcast area: Cambridgeshire, south Lincolnshire and west Norfolk
- Frequency: 102.7 MHz
- RDS: HEART

Programming
- Format: Hot AC

Ownership
- Owner: Heart Network, Global Radio

History
- First air date: 10 July 1980
- Former names: Hereward Radio (1980–1992); Hereward FM (1992-2009)
- Former frequencies: 95.7 FM; 1332 MW

Links
- Website: www.heartpeterborough.co.uk

Heart Peterborough (formerly Hereward FM) was an Independent Local Radio station serving Cambridgeshire, south Lincolnshire and west Norfolk. Launched on 10 July 1980 as Hereward Radio 225, the station was the first local service in the area, with the studios originally based in the back of a former pub in Bridge Street, Peterborough, before relocating to the Queensgate shopping centre in the city in 1987.

== History ==
With the tagline of the station you can really call your own, Hereward Radio began on 95.7 MHz and 225 metres/1332 kHz. Reorganisation of the FM broadcast band moved the station to 102.7 since around 1987/1988, with BBC Radio Cambridgeshire using the former frequency for the Peterborough area.

Notable personalities from the past include the former chief executive of GCap Media, Ralph Bernard, who was the station's first news editor. Hereward split its AM and FM frequencies in April 1992, and called its 1332 kHz AM service 'WGMS - The World's Greatest Music Station'.

The station was bought out by the GWR Group in 1995 from its original management, Mid-Anglia Radio plc.

On 5 January 2009, Hereward FM rebranded as Heart Peterborough, as part of a major rebrand involving twenty-nine stations owned by Global Radio.

On 21 June 2010, Global Radio announced that Heart Peterborough's programming would be merged with Heart Cambridge as part of plans to reduce the Heart network of stations from 33 to 16. It has still got different advertisements to Heart Cambridge. Heart Cambridgeshire's programming began broadcasting from Peterborough on 2 July 2010. On 19 September 2011, the station announced it would relocate to new studios in the Histon area of Cambridge.

=== Morborne Mast collapse ===
In October 2004, the 153-metre Morborne mast near Peterborough collapsed after a fire in suspicious circumstances, taking Hereward's DAB service off the air, along with the national and local BBC services. A temporary mast was soon erected, restoring the service and a new permanent mast has since been erected.
