= Classic Gold Digital Network =

UK radio network

Classic Gold Digital Network was one of the biggest 'gold' (oldies) formatted radio networks in the United Kingdom, with a potential audience of 47 million. Classic Gold was broadcast on analogue and DAB digital platforms, as well as Sky channel 0189. The first stations were launched in 1988; the network grew to 18 stations and was merged into what became the Gold network in 2007.

== History ==
Most of the stations were originally the medium wave services of Independent Local Radio stations. For example, "Classic Gold 1359" in Coventry was originally part of Mercia Sound and was a full local service. In the 1980s, FM/AM stations split (in this case to Mercia FM and Xtra AM), before the station was bought by GWR radio in 1993, and the AM station rebranded to "Classic Gold".

In 1998, Classic Gold in Northampton legally rebranded to Classic Gold 1557 Northamptonshire.

The stations were sold to UBC in two tranches in 2000 and 2002; however, in 2007 they came back under the control of GCap (formerly GWR & Capital). Most stations in the network carried the same programming, except for a local 4-hour afternoon programme from 3pm to 7pm.

Additionally, the AM service operated by UTV Radio in West Yorkshire, Pulse Classic Gold, carried programming supplied by the Classic Gold network (with additional localisation and programmes), although it was not owned by UBC.

In summer 2007, GCap Media agreed to acquire the 18 AM Classic Gold radio stations owned by Classic Gold Digital for a cash consideration of £3.95 million. GCap merged the network with its own Capital Gold network of stations to form one classic hits network. The acquisition, which included relevant DAB digital licences held by Classic Gold, was approved by Ofcom. The new network rebranded as 'Gold' launched at 7pm on Friday 3 August 2007.

== Programmes ==
Weekdays

- Classic Gold's Even Tastier Breakfast with Tony Blackburn and Laura Frey
- The Morning Show with Graham Rogers
- The Afternoon Show with Paul Burnett
- Classic Gold Drivetime (local opt-out programme)
- Classic Gold Evening Show with Paul Baker
- Classic Gold Late Night with Tim Allen
- The Overnight Express with Matthew Hardy

Weekends included

- The Retro Countdown with Mark Dennison
- Classic Gold Albums with Trevor Dann
- Neil Sean's Star People
- Saturday Night At The Movies with Steve Springett
- The Essential Tony Blackburn

== Presenters ==
- Paul Burnett
- Gary Crowley
- Trevor Dann
- Tony Blackburn
- Jimmy Savile (deceased)
- Dave Lee Travis
- Johnnie Walker
- Mike Read
- Noddy Holder (from Slade)
- David Hamilton (now at Boom Radio and 45 Radio)
- Simon Bates
- Emperor Rosko
- Andy James
- Chris Hawkins

== Regional stations ==
These were the 20 stations in the Classic Gold Digital Network on 3 August 2007:

- Classic Gold 1152, Plymouth
- Classic Gold 1260, Bristol and Bath
- Classic Gold 1332, Peterborough
- Classic Gold 1359, Coventry and Warwickshire
- Classic Gold 1359/1431, Essex
- Classic Gold 1431/1485, Reading
- Classic Gold 1521, Reigate and Crawley
- Classic Gold 1557, Northampton
- Classic Gold 666/954, Exeter and Torbay
- Classic Gold 774, Gloucester
- Classic Gold 828, Bournemouth
- Classic Gold 828/792, Hertfordshire, Bedfordshire, Buckinghamshire and Cambridgeshire
- Classic Gold 936/1161, Swindon and West Wiltshire
- Classic Gold 990/1017, Wolverhampton, Shrewsbury and Telford
- Classic Gold Amber, Norfolk and North Suffolk
- Classic Gold Amber, Ipswich and Bury St Edmunds
- Classic Gold Digital: Humberside, Lancashire, Leeds, London, Merseyside, Sheffield, Teesside, & Tyne & Wear on DAB; it also broadcast on Sky Digital Channel 0189
- Classic Gold GEM, Nottingham and Derby
- Classic Gold Marcher, Wrexham and Chester

In addition, until 1 December 2008, the UTV Radio-owned Pulse Classic Gold in West Yorkshire broadcast programming supplied by the network, with additional localisation and programmes specific to West Yorkshire. This station relaunched as Pulse 2, a completely local station before closing in August 2020 to become Greatest Hits Radio West Yorkshire.
