= GCap Media =

British radio broadcasting company

- Type: Defunct
- Industry: Media
- Founded: May 9, 2005
- Defunct: November 1, 2008
- Fate: Bought by Global Radio
- Successor: Global Radio
- Headquarters: London
- Key people: Ralph Bernard (2005–07), Steve Orchard (2005–08), Fru Hazlitt (2007–08), David Mansfield (2005), Ashley Tabor (2008)
- Products: Broadcasting
- Parent: Global Radio

GCap Media was a British commercial radio company formed from the merger of the Capital Radio Group and GWR Group.

The merger was completed on 9 May 2005. It was listed on the London Stock Exchange and was a constituent of the FTSE 250 Index. On 31 March 2008, the company agreed on a takeover by the Global Radio for £375 million. This was completed on 6 June 2008, and the company became a wholly owned subsidiary of Global Radio.

On 1 November 2008, Global Radio discontinued using the name GCap Media.

== Pre-merger ==
=== Capital Radio Group ===
Capital Radio Group was, until May 2005, a London-based British radio group. The company was originally set up to operate a General Entertainment Independent Local Radio service in October 1973. Capital Radio was the second legal commercial radio station to launch in the UK, a few days after London news station LBC. In the 1980s, the station was allowed to operate separate services on the AM and FM stations.

Changes in the media ownership laws meant, that Capital Radio Group was able to acquire other stations throughout the UK, becoming a powerful player in the UK's commercial radio industry; before the merger with GWR. In 1993, Capital bought BRMB, and in 1994, the Southern Radio Group which owned Southern FM in Sussex, Invicta FM in Kent, Power FM and Ocean FM in Hampshire, Fox FM in Oxfordshire and Red Dragon FM in South Wales, were also purchased in the 90s. Capital also acquired the Century FM stations in 2000, as well as Border Television to acquire its radio stations (subsequently selling the station to Granada plc, a year later). All in all, Capital Radio Group controlled 22 analogue and 59 digital radio licences. In July 1998, Capital Radio Group bought the financially troubled "alternative" radio station, Xfm.

In the early 21st century, Capital Radio Group expanded its range of FM stations, and also started broadcasting digital-only stations, such as Capital Disney and Capital Life.

=== GWR Group ===
GWR Group was a British radio company with major assets, including the nationwide station Classic FM and an extensive network of independent local radio stations in the UK.

Between 1996 and 1999, GWR was a major shareholder in London News Radio, which owned and operated London's LBC and News Direct radio stations. These stations were sold to Chrysalis Radio in 2002.

GWR was owned by Daily Mail and General Trust plc (majority share), various asset management firms, Sir Peter Michael, and other small shareholders. Until the merger, the group was chaired by Ralph Bernard, and its head office was in Passage Street, Bristol.

During its existence, GWR acquired the Marcher Radio Group, Mid Anglia Radio Group, Chiltern Radio Group and East Anglian Radio Group, to name but a few.

==== Key dates ====
- 1981: Wiltshire Radio is founded.
- 1982: Wiltshire Radio begins broadcasting.
- 1985: Wiltshire Radio merges with Radio West to form GWR.
- 1987: GWR Group goes public.
- 1988: GWR joins Classic FM partnership.
- 1992: Classic FM begins broadcasting.
- 1996: GWR acquires full control of Classic FM.
- 1998: GWR wins Digital One license.
- 1999: Digital One begins broadcasting; launches Internet radio broadcasts.
- 2000: GWR acquires DMG Radio.

==== Programming ====
GWR attempted to revolutionise local radio with its policy of branding its stations with similar phrases, initially "today's better music mix", later "today's best mix" and "the best mix of the 80s, 90s and today". This was after a landmark ruling in July 1995 by The Radio Authority had given GWR permission to begin programme-networking across many of its FM stations.

By 2008, it had four main syndicated programmes: a weekday mid-morning programme which started in 2008 hosted by Phillippa Collins (this show was only carried on a few stations, when taken over by Global radio, the show was rolled out to all stations), a week-nightly music and showbiz based programme, (formerly called 'Core Control' and then 'Music Control') (weekdays 7 pm to 10 pm) presented by Kam and Sally, (Kam was replaced by Kevin Hughes), 'Late Night Love' (Sunday to Thursday 10pm to 1am) presented by Graham Torrington (later the show was replaced by 'the wind down' presented by Cat James), and Music On Demand (1am till Breakfast, 7 days a week) presented by Tony Wright (Now Celador Radio), then James Clayton and latterly Dan Wood (now Gem) and at weekends Andy Henly. On Friday and Saturday evenings, the network splits, with most stations taking Non-Stop Party (Friday 10pm to 1am) and Party Anthems (Saturday 7pm to 10pm), while the other stations take School Daze (Friday 10 pm to 1 am) and Hairbrush Divas (Saturday 7 pm to 10 pm). All stations then take a Non-Stop Party show (Saturday 10 pm to 1 am).

== GCap – The merged company ==
The two groups officially "tied the knot" on 9 May 2005, with GCap employees being given branded 'GCap' digital radios to commemorate the launch. For the first five months the group was run by Ralph Bernard (ex-GWR) as Executive chairman, and David Mansfield (ex-Capital Radio Group) as CEO. David Mansfield stepped down on the afternoon of 19 September 2005 with Ralph Bernard taking over both roles. Within weeks of the merger, rumours had abounded about disagreements between Bernard and Mansfield about the future direction of the company, and this was compounded by a £184m loss in the market capitalisation of the two combined entities by the time the merger was sealed. Many market commentators felt that the savings brought about by cost cutting and elimination of duplicated departments across the company were far outweighed by large drops in the audience and advertising revenue across the newly formed group. Over the following months, amid rumours of a GWR putsch, and continuing dissatisfaction from the City, a stream of executives from the former Capital Radio Group side of the business left the company, including David Mansfield himself.

=== Restructure and the 'failed sale' ===
In October 2005, GCap Media announced around 100 job losses and the sale of nine non-core radio stations, as part of a restructuring initiative. By this time, over £300m had been wiped off the market capitalisation of GCap Media, and the group was frequently touted as a take-over target by City commentators. The nine stations, which included the Marcher Group stations in North Wales and Orchard FM in the West Country, came with a price tag of £75m. Eventually, after bids as low as £25m were placed and interest waned, GCap Media called off the sale.

=== Classic Gold acquisition ===
In April 2007, GCap Media announced that it was acquiring 18 AM and DAB 'Classic Gold' radio stations from Unique Broadcasting Company Media Group. Many of these licences had formerly been operated by GWR Group before being sold to Unique. It was announced that the stations would be merged with existing Capital Gold AM licences to form a new station, Gold, which launched on 3 August 2007.

=== Ralph Bernard leaves ===
In November 2007, it was announced that Ralph Bernard was leaving as the CEO of the company. This was unusual, as neither he nor the company named a successor, but announced that they would start to look for one. This uncertainty caused a massive drop in the share price of the company, and it never recovered from that, leaving the new CEO with a difficult task to rebuild share value for the shareholders.

=== Withdrawal from DAB and disposal of "non-core" stations ===
In the late December 2007, Fru Hazlitt was appointed CEO. Under pressure from a £313m share offer to the board from Global Radio (made possible by the low value of the shares), Hazlitt laid out her plans for the company's recovery to financial health on 11 February 2008. Cost-cutting lay at the heart of Hazlitt's statement, including divesting GCap of its costly involvement in DAB – directly turning her back on the 'digital future' policy of her predecessor. It was announced that GCap had sold its interest in Digital One to Arqiva, and that "non-core" DAB stations, Planet Rock and theJazz, would be closing by the end of March 2008.

The station theJazz ceased broadcasting as announced, but Planet Rock remained on air while negotiations took place with potential buyers, which were successfully concluded in June 2008. In addition, the non-London XFM stations would also be closed if they could not be sold, as the stations were forecast to make a combined loss of £800,000 in 2008. An improved offer from Global was finally accepted by GCap shareholders, resulting in the departure of the group's senior management. Fru Hazlitt resigned in May 2008.

== Takeover by Global Radio ==
The Office of Fair Trading conducted an investigation into the take-over of GCap by Global, and cleared it in August 2008, on the condition that BRMB, Beacon Radio, Mercia FM, Wyvern FM, and Heart East Midlands were sold to satisfy the competition concerns.

On 23 September 2008, it was announced that Fun Radio had been sold to Folder Media, leaving Chill as GCap's only digital station.

== Stations owned ==
=== National radio stations ===
- Classic FM

=== XFM stations ===
- Xfm London
- Xfm Manchester
- Xfm Scotland – previously Beat 106

=== The One Network ===
This was a network of local radio stations in various towns and cities around the UK. It comprised the local stations previously part of GWR's Mix Network and the Capital Radio Group's local stations.

- 2CR FM (Bournemouth)
- 2-Ten FM (Reading)
- Beacon Radio (Wolverhampton)
- Beat 106
- BRMB (Birmingham)
- Radio Broadland (Norwich)
- Buzz 97.1 (Wrexham)
- 95.8 Capital FM (London)
- Champion 103 (Bangor)
- 96.9 Chiltern FM (Bedford)
- 97.6 Chiltern FM (Dunstable)
- Coast 96.3 (Bangor)
- Essex FM (Chelmsford)
- Fox FM (Oxfordshire)
- Gemini FM (Exeter & Torbay)
- GWR FM Bath
- GWR FM Bristol
- GWR FM Wiltshire (Swindon)
- Hereward FM (Peterborough)
- Horizon Radio (Milton Keynes)
- Invicta FM (Whitstable)
- Lantern FM (Barnstaple)
- Leicester Sound
- Marcher Sound (Wrexham)
- Mercia FM (Coventry)
- Mercury FM (Crawley)
- Northants 96 (Northampton)
- Ocean FM (Fareham)
- Orchard FM (Taunton)
- Plymouth Sound
- Power FM (Fareham)
- Q103 (Cambridge)
- RAM FM (Derby)
- Red Dragon FM (Cardiff)
- Severn Sound (Gloucester)
- SGR Colchester
- SGR Ipswich
- South Hams Radio (Kingsbridge)
- Southern FM (Portslade)
- Ten 17 (Harlow, Essex)
- Trent FM (Nottingham)
- Wyvern FM (Worcester)

=== AM local radio stations ===
- Gold – quasi-national network, broadcasting in the following areas:

Birmingham (AM & DAB), Black Country (AM & DAB), Bournemouth (AM & DAB), Bristol & Bath (AM & DAB), Cambridge (DAB), Cardiff & Newport (AM & DAB), Coventry (AM & DAB), Derby (AM), Essex (AM & DAB), Exeter & Torbay (DAB), Gloucester & Cheltenham (AM), Greater London (AM & DAB), Humberside (DAB), Kent (AM & DAB), Lancashire (DAB), Leeds (DAB), Luton & Bedford (AM), Manchester (AM & DAB), Norfolk & North Suffolk (AM & DAB), Northamptonshire (AM), Nottingham (AM & DAB), Peterborough (AM & DAB), Plymouth (AM & DAB), Reading (AM & DAB), Reigate & Crawley (AM), Shropshire (AM), South Hampshire (AM & DAB), South Yorkshire (DAB), Suffolk (AM), Sussex (AM & DAB), Swindon & Wiltshire (AM), Teesside (DAB), Tyne & Wear (DAB), Wrexham & Chester (AM).

=== Digital-only stations ===
- Chill – National Digital Station also on Sky and Virgin Media.

=== Internet television stations ===
- Classic FM TV

=== Former stations ===
- KMFM Medway – sold to the KM Group in 2002
- KMFM West Kent – sold to the KM Group in 2002
- The Storm – closed 20 January 2006
- Capital Disney – closed 29 June 2007
- Core – closed 11 January 2008
- Capital Life – closed 31 March 2008
- theJazz – closed 31 March 2008
- Xfm South Wales – sold to Town and Country Broadcasting on 31 May 2008
- Planet Rock - sold to Malcolm Bluemel's 'Rock Show' consortium
- Fun Radio (with HIT Entertainment)

== See also ==
- The One Network
