= Smooth Radio presenter history =

The presenter history of Smooth Radio includes many well-known British radio personalities who made their names on networks such as Radio 1, Radio 2, and other stations. The Smooth Radio brand began life in 2004 with the Manchester-based 100.4 Smooth FM, and gradually expanded to encompass a number of regional stations; these were subsumed into a UK-wide station in 2010. The regional stations were reintroduced in 2014.

Several prominent broadcasters and disc jockeys have been recruited to the line-up. Current and former presenters on Smooth include Emma B, Simon Bates, Tony Blackburn, Paul Coia, Kate Garraway, Mark Goodier, Kevin Greening, David Jensen, Myleene Klass, Lynn Parsons, Eamonn Kelly, Andy Peebles and Graham Torrington. As a national broadcaster, the station's flagship breakfast show was presented by Simon Bates, who left Classic FM after more than a decade to join Smooth. Breakfast and Drivetime shows are currently fronted by a number of regional presenters. In addition, Smooth has also played featured one-off specials presented by personalities such as Russell Grant, Denise Van Outen and Dionne Warwick.

== Pre-2010 ==
Kevin Greening was a presenter on 102.2 Smooth Radio, and had worked for its predecessor, 102.2 Smooth FM. Lynn Parsons joined 102.2 Smooth Radio along with Capital FM's Mike Allen in March 2007. Mark Goodier also joined Smooth in London in March 2007 to present his first daily radio programme for a decade, which was networked from September of that year. In September 2012 he announced he would leave Smooth in mid-December to focus on his company, Wise Buddah Productions.

Carlos hosted a show on 105.7 Smooth Radio in Birmingham until joining the national Smooth Radio in 2010. Dave Hickman—formerly of BRMB and 100.7 Heart FM—also presented on 105.7 Smooth Radio from 2008. After joining 102.2 Smooth Radio in February 2008, veteran broadcaster Tony Blackburn presented a syndicated weekend breakfast show for Smooth later that year. He left the station in October 2010 to present Pick of the Pops on BBC Radio 2 because the BBC would not allow him to continue working for a rival broadcaster. Fiona Phillips was signed to present a networked Sunday afternoon show from 23 March 2008, but after disappointing audience figures she was dropped from the schedule a year later. Chris Tarrant joined the station in 2008 and presented a weekly Saturday morning show for several GMG stations to compete with Jonathan Ross's programme on Radio 2. The show aired for twelve months, after which Tarrant's contract with GMG Radio was not renewed. Former BBC Radio Scotland and Pebble Mill presenter Paul Coia was a Drivetime presenter on 102.2 Smooth Radio from December 2008, having previously been a stand-in presenter.

Andy Peebles began presenting a networked weekday evening show from March 2009, having presented Soul Train on 100.4 Smooth Radio upon its launch in 2004. His weekday evening show ended in January 2013, but he continued to present Soul Train for Smooth for another few months, after which the station's owners, Global Radio transferred the show to its Gold network. Former head of music at GMG Radio Terry Underhill joined the network in 2009, but left in 2011 to take up the position at UTV Media as director of programming. In September 2009 record producer Pete Waterman was signed to present a programme featuring some of his favourite hits from the 1970s and 1980s.

== 2010–2014 ==
When GMG launched Smooth as a national station in 2010, Simon Bates left Classic FM after 13 years to join Smooth Radio as its new weekday breakfast presenter from January 2011. Bates revived The Golden Hour and Our Tune, two popular features from his Radio 1 days. David "Kid" Jensen was signed in November 2010 to present an afternoon show from 2011. later confirmed to begin from April. After going on to present Drivetime, he left the station in December 2013.

Pat Sharp was appointed as Tony Blackburn's replacement in January 2011, and after later becoming Smooth's afternoon presenter, departed along with Jensen in December 2013. Emma B joined the network in March 2011 to host a Sunday afternoon show. In January 2012 Graham Torrington joined the station to host his Late Night Love show on Sunday evenings, but left after three months, and was replaced by a syndicated programme from the United States presented by Donny Osmond. In October 2012 Smooth announced stand-in presenter David Prever would become a permanent host from December, taking over from Lynn Parsons at weekends, who was confirmed as Mark Goodier's replacement on the weekday mid morning show. Daryl Denham joined the network in January 2013 to present the weekend breakfast show after an overhaul of the schedule saw Pat Sharp move to become the weekday afternoon presenter. Denham left Smooth in January 2014. From 10 March 2013, Kate Thornton presented The Boots Feel Good Forum, an eight-part series dedicated to health and fitness, which aired on Smooth and its sister station, Real Radio. In August 2013, Andi Peters was signed up to present a Sunday lunchtime programme, after previously hosting a number of Bank Holiday specials for the station. The programme was dropped as part of a schedule overhaul less than two months later.

The station announced a major overhaul of its schedule following its relocation from Manchester to London in October 2013. The actress Tina Hobley was announced as a Sunday morning presenter. Others to join the station were Paul Hollins to present Smooth Radio's Movie Songs and Smooth Soul Sunday, Gary King for a Sunday lunchtime show and David Andrews with a Soul and Motown show on Sunday evenings. The changes also saw the departure of many well-known names, such as Andy Peebles and Andi Peters.

In December 2013, it was announced that former LBC 97.3 presenter Anthony Davis would join the station as its Drivetime presenter from January 2014. Eamonn Kelly—former breakfast presenter on Nottingham's 106.6 Smooth Radio—took over Sunday breakfast from January 2014 following Daryl Denham's departure.

== 2014–present ==
Global Radio announced a relaunch of the Smooth Radio Brand in February 2014, taking effect from 3 March. This coincided with a return to some regional programming, and the departure of Simon Bates, Lynn Parsons, Carlos and David Prever. New names joining the network included ex-GMTV presenter Andrew Castle, who would host the breakfast show in London, replacing Bates. Other changes included Kate Garraway taking over Parsons' mid-morning show, Paul Phear joining the network as an afternoon presenter and Heart Cambridge presenter Chris Skinner replacing Carlos in the evenings. Myleene Klass of Classic FM was also given a Saturday morning show on Smooth, replacing David Prever.

Global announced that regional breakfast and drivetime shows would return from 24 March 2014, and a raft of presenters were hired to host the programmes. As well as Castle and Davis presenting breakfast and drivetime for Smooth Radio London, Darren Parks, formerly of Real Radio joined to present the breakfast show on Smooth Radio North West, while Carlos returned to front the region's drivetime programme. Smooth Radio North East hired Steve Coleman, previously a presenter on Magic AM for breakfast, and Clive Warren, formerly of Metro Radio and Radio 1 as his drivetime counterpart. On Smooth Radio East Midlands, the roles were filled by Gareth Evans of BBC Radio Nottingham and Emma Caldwell of Capital FM, while Nigel Freshman of Free Radio and Charlie Jordan, previously a Smooth presenter in the West Midlands joined Smooth West Midlands.

Changes continued throughout 2015, which included the axe of the Saturday and Sunday soul shows and several weekday shows were reduced from four to three hours a day. In May 2015, Paul Phear replaced Chris Skinner as presenter of the Saturday evening show The Great British Songbook, whilst Skinner replaced Phear as presenter of Sunday afternoons. The Great British Songbook was eventually dropped in October 2015 and replaced with the Saturday Sanctuary. Danny Pietroni of Magic 105.4 FM joined Smooth in November 2015 as presenter of the daily late night Smooth Love Songs Show. On 22 March 2016 it was announced that Andrew Castle would leave the Smooth Breakfast Show after two years and was replaced by Absolute Radio DJ Russ Williams. Later that same year, Martin Collins returned to Smooth Radio from Magic 105.4 to present the weekend edition of Smooth Love Songs. At the beginning of 2017 Tina Hobley replaced Anthony Davis as presenter of Smooth Drive Home. In March 2017, Margherita Taylor, formally of Heart London replaced Chris Skinner as presenter of the Sunday Afternoon Show, in the same month David Andrews, presenter of the weekday edition of The Smooth Nightshift left the station and was replaced by Paul Hollins. In October 2017, Gary Vincent, previously of Magic 105.4 FM replaced Chris Skinner as presenter of the Weekday edition of The Smooth Sanctuary.

On Christmas' Eve 2017, Andrew Castle presented the last Great American Songbook. The show was reverted into Smooth Sanctuary from 2018. Castle left the station in March 2018 and Gary Vincent fulfilled the presenting duties of the Sunday Smooth Sanctuary. In February 2018, Russ Williams resigned from presenting the Smooth Breakfast Show and was replaced by Gary King.

On 2 September 2019, a new networked afternoon Drivetime show was introduced across all Smooth stations, hosted by Angie Greaves, joining the station from Magic. Weekday breakfast remained local to each FM station, mostly retaining existing presenters. Carlos moved from Smooth North West drive to the breakfast show on Heart 70s.

On 3 January 2020, Jenni Falconer moved over from sister network Heart to present breakfast on Smooth London (also aired on Smooth Wales, Smooth Extra and Smooth UK); Gary King moved to an early-breakfast programme. Kirsty Gallacher joined Smooth to front a Saturday afternoon show in July 2021, moving to weekday drivetime on Gold Radio in January 2025.

Falconer's weekday breakfast show was extended to the entire Smooth Radio FM network from 24 February 2025, replacing previous regional weekday breakfast programmes; some of the impacted presenters were retained by Global, with Darren Parks of Smooth North West appointed to front The Smooth Sanctuary on weekday evenings and Nigel Freshman of Smooth West Midlands at Smooth 80s.

== One-off presenters ==
Denise Van Outen has hosted one-off shows for Smooth, covering for Emma B in May 2011, presenting a special programme on Christmas Eve, and again on Easter Monday 2012. The former BBC Royal Correspondent Jennie Bond reported on the wedding of Prince William and Catherine Middleton for Smooth on 29 April 2011. The astrologer Russell Grant joined the network to present a one-off programme on 27 August (Bank Holiday Monday) featuring some of his favourite songs from the 1960s. The singer Michael Bublé presented a series of three shows over Christmas 2012. Also over the 2012 holiday season Dionne Warwick hosted a programme in which she talked about her life in music, while Katherine Jenkins had a one-off special playing some of her favourite songs.

== See also ==
- Timeline of Smooth Radio
