= Timeline of Smooth Radio =

A timeline of notable events relating to Smooth Radio, a British radio station that first launched in 2004. Note that this article also includes information about the national version of Smooth Radio that existed between 2010 and 2014.

== 1990s ==
- 1990
  - 4 March – Jazz FM launches in London.
- 1994
  - 1 September – A second Jazz FM station launches in north west England, becoming one of the UK's first five regional commercial radio stations.

== 2000s ==
- 2002
  - The Jazz FM stations are purchased by GMG Radio.
- 2003
  - GMG Radio conducts market research into the type of music that listeners in the north-west of England wanted to hear on the radio. The study concluded that many people were dissuaded by the name Jazz. Consequently, bosses decide to revamp and relaunch the station as Smooth FM.
- 2004
  - 13 February – After nearly 10 years on air, 100.4 Jazz FM closes.
  - 1 March – 100.4 Smooth FM launches across north west England. Jazz continues to be part of the off-peak schedule with daytime programming focussing on mainstream music aimed at an older audience.
- 2005
  - 27 May – After more than 15 years on air, 102.2 Jazz FM closes.
  - 7 June – 102.2 Smooth FM launches as the replacement service for 102.2 Jazz FM.
  - 25 July – London's 102.2 Smooth FM signs a three-year deal with Chelsea F.C. to provide exclusive match coverage of the club's games until the end of the 2007–08 season.
- 2006
  - December – GMG Radio, owners of the two Smooth stations, purchases the Saga Radio Group.
- 2007
  - 21 March – It is confirmed that former BBC Radio 1 and Capital London presenter Lynn Parsons and ex-Capital London host Mike Allen will join 102.2 Smooth Radio which launches on 26 March. The line-up will also include Graham Dene, Mark Goodier, Nick Piercey, Kevin Greening, Martin Collins and Nick Barraclough. Mark Goodier will present his first daily radio show for more than a decade on the station.
  - 26 March – All Smooth Radio and Saga Radio are relaunched as the Smooth Network.
  - 23 August – GMG Radio confirms that Mark Goodier's mid-morning show on 102.2 Smooth Radio will be syndicated across other Smooth stations in the network from September.
- 2008
  - 8 January – Launch of 97.5 Smooth Radio in North East England.
  - 11 March – Smooth Radio has recruited GMTV presenter Fiona Phillips to present a Sunday afternoon show on 102.2 Smooth Radio from Easter Sunday (23 March).
  - 23 April – An application by GMG Radio to end a commitment that Smooth Radio in London and Manchester must play 45 hours of jazz each week is rejected by Ofcom. GMG had wanted to drop the commitment as part of plans to relaunch Jazz FM.
  - 3 June – Tony Blackburn's weekend breakfast show on 102.2 Smooth Radio is to be syndicated across the rest of the Smooth network in England from 7 June.
  - 30 June – It is announced that Chris Tarrant will return to radio, hosting a weekly Saturday morning show for GMG Radio's network of stations including London's 102.2 Smooth Radio, Real Radio (Scotland) and the North West's Century Radio. The show will air in direct competition to Jonathan Ross's show on BBC Radio 2. It began on 26 July.
  - 21 November – London's 102.2 Smooth Radio announces that former BBC Radio Scotland and Pebble Mill presenter Paul Coia will replace Martin Collins as its Drivetime presenter.
- 2009
  - 25 July – Chris Tarrant presents his last Saturday morning show for GMG Radio.
  - 4 September – Smooth Radio recruits record producer Pete Waterman to present a Sunday evening programme focusing on music from the 1970s and 1980s, his show begins on 13 September.
  - 10 November – Thirteen stations owned by GMG Radio take part in an eighteen-hour on-air appeal to raise money for the Help for Heroes charity. The event raises almost £200,000.

== 2010s ==
- 2010
  - 27 February – The six stations in the Smooth Radio network stage a "Starlight Supper", en event aimed at raising money for a number of charities: Breast Cancer Care in London, Macmillan Cancer Support in the Northwest, North East and West Midlands, the Rainbows Hospice for Children and Young People in the East Midlands and Marie Curie's Big Build in Glasgow.
  - 30 April – It is reported that Smooth and Real Radio have become the official broadcasters of the switch-on ceremony for the Blackpool Illuminations, after securing the broadcast rights from BBC Radio 2 which had aired it since 1997.
  - 29 June – Smooth Radio announces plans to merge its five stations based in England, creating a national network. The new station will be based in Manchester and will see the loss of 60 jobs at Smooth's other bases. A phased launch will begin on 4 October.
  - 17 August – It is announced that Simon Bates will join Smooth Radio as its new national breakfast presenter from 4 January 2011.
  - 29 September – Smooth launches an ad campaign ahead of its national launch featuring eight of its listeners, who have been recruited as Smooth ambassadors.
  - 4 October – Smooth Radio launches its new national station.
  - 31 October – Tony Blackburn presents his final Weekend Breakfast Show, as he leaves the station.
  - 11 December – It is reported that David "Kid" Jensen is to join Smooth Radio as an afternoon presenter. He would make his debut on 4 April 2011.
- 2011
  - 4 January – Simon Bates joins the station to become its new national breakfast presenter.
  - 12 January – Pat Sharp joins the station as Smooth Radio's new Weekend Breakfast presenter with immediate effect, By this time he had been presenting the show since December 2010, having taken over from Graham Dene who had been standing in since Tony Blackburn's departure in October 2010.
  - 27 March – Emma B joins the station to present a Sunday afternoon show.
  - 4 April – David "Kid" Jensen joins the station to present a weekday afternoon show.
  - 11 September – On the 10th anniversary of the September 11 attacks on the United States, Smooth airs a documentary featuring British people who were living in New York City at the time of the attacks. This is followed by live coverage of the remembrance service from Ground Zero, the former site of the World Trade Center, which was destroyed in the attacks.
  - September – Simon Bates presents a week of shows from South Australia as part of a promotion in which the station gives away a holiday to the state.
  - 1 November – GMG Radio launches a dedicated station playing nothing but Christmas music, under the brand "Smooth Christmas". The station had no news or advertisements but did promote Smooth Radio and broadcast until 27 December 2011.
  - 12 December – Simon Bates takes the Smooth Radio Breakfast show to Afghanistan for a week of programmes with British troops from Camp Bastion.
  - 23 December – GMG Radio confirms plans to launch a station dedicated to music from the 1970s on a trial basis. Smooth 70s will replace Smooth Christmas on the Digital One platform from 27 December.
  - 27 December – Launch of Smooth 70s.
- 2012
  - 8 January – Graham Torrington joins the station to host his Late Night Love show on the station.
  - 12 January – GMG Radio confirms a deal with US syndication firm Premiere Networks to air 1970s editions of the original American Top 40 show presented by Casey Kasem at weekends on its new digital station Smooth 70s. The station also features Disco Lunch and Late Night Love Songs among its weekday programming.
  - 21 March – Smooth Radio announces a deal to begin airing a syndicated show from the United States presented by singer Donny Osmond from 8 April, replacing Graham Torrington's Late Night Love. Torrington will leave the station, while other changes include Drivetime's Carlos and afternoon presenter David "Kid" Jensen swapping shows.
  - 8 April – Forces broadcaster BFBS simulcasts a two-hour show with Smooth Radio allowing family and friends of serving troops to connect with their loved ones.
  - 14 May – "Jealous of the Angels", a song recorded by US country singer Jenn Bostic and inspired by her father, is first played by Simon Bates on his Simon Bates at Breakfast show on Smooth Radio as part of the Our Tune strand. The song is quickly among the station's Top 10 Most Played for the week, and goes on to receive over two million views on YouTube.
  - 27 May – Simon Bates presents a special programme ahead of the Thames Diamond Jubilee Pageant, previewing Elizabeth II's journey along the Thames on the Spirit of Chartwell. Given special access to the vessel chosen as the royal barge he chats to the boat's owner, Philip Morrell as well as composer Debbie Wiseman who was commissioned to write the music for the event.
  - 11 June – Simon Bates takes the Smooth Radio Breakfast Show to the Falkland Islands for a week of programmes to mark the 30th anniversary of the Falklands War.
  - 25 June – GMG Radio is sold to Global Radio for an undisclosed amount, thought to be around £50m. However, no structural changes will be made to either organisations until the deal has been investigated by Ofcom.
  - 27 August
    - Astrologer Russell Grant joins the station to present a one-off programme playing some of his favourite tracks from the 1960s.
    - The digital station Smooth 70s counts down its Top 70 of the 70s chart after inviting listeners to vote for their favourite hits from the decade. The chart, presented by several presenters from the main Smooth Radio station, with ABBA's "Dancing Queen" as its number one.
  - 5 September – Mark Goodier announces he will leave Smooth Radio in mid-December to focus on his company, Wise Buddah Productions.
  - 12 September – The radio industry news website Radio Today reports that Simon Bates has started to present a separate breakfast show for Smooth Radio's sister station, Smooth 70s. The content is "voice tracked" from the main breakfast show.
  - 30 October – Smooth Radio confirms that Smooth Christmas will return, airing on the Digital One multiplex in the lead up to the festive season, giving the brand three stations on the platform.
  - December – Mark Goodier leaves.
  - 14 December – Real and Smooth have secured exclusive broadcast rights to the "Christmas Hit Factory Live" concert, a show featuring artists and groups who achieved success with the Stock Aitken and Waterman and PWL record labels. The event is held on 21 December and is aired on New Year's Eve.
  - 17 December – Lynn Parsons takes over Smooth Radio's weekday Mid Morning show from Mark Goodier. David Prever succeeds her as presenter of the weekend Mid Morning slot.
- 2013
  - 14 January – Smooth Radio overhauls its schedule. Changes include the introduction of a new movie programme on Saturdays and documentary slot on Sunday afternoons. Daryl Denham becomes weekend breakfast presenter as Pat Sharp takes over Carlos's afternoon show. In turn, Carlos succeeds Andy Peebles as weekday evening presenter, with the latter becoming a weekend presenter.
  - 22 March – In a rare move for a radio station, and to celebrate the 40th anniversary of the release of Pink Floyd's "The Dark Side of the Moon", Smooth 70s plays the album in its entirety.
  - 21 May – The Competition Commission publishes its final report into Global's acquisition of GMG Radio, requiring Global to sell radio stations in seven locations. (Note: The stations involved were: Smooth or Capital (East Midlands); Real or Capital (South Wales); Real or Heart (North Wales); Capital or Real XS with either Real or Smooth (North West); Real or Smooth or Capital (North East); Real or Capital (Yorkshire); and Real or Capital (Scotland))
  - 8 August – Smooth Radio hires former CBBC presenter Andi Peters to present a Sunday lunchtime show, as he joins the station.
  - 1 October – Smooth Radio is moved to Global Radio's Leicester Square headquarters in London and given a makeover.
  - 3 October – Global Radio announces that Smooth 70s will close less than a week after Smooth programming moved to its London headquarters.
  - 6 October – Actress Tina Hobley begins presenting a Sunday Morning show on Smooth Radio, as she joins the station.
- 2014
  - 8 January – Smooth Radio announces that weekend breakfast presenter Daryl Denham has left the station with immediate effect. His shows will be taken over by Emma B on Saturdays and Eamonn Kelly on Sundays.
  - 4 February – The Radio Today website reports that Ofcom have given Global Radio permission to remove Smooth Radio from the Digital One platform, and replace it with a new national station. Under the agreement, Smooth will continue to air on its regional FM frequencies, but with a greater local output.
  - 24 February – Plans are announced for Smooth Radio's relaunch, which will begin from 3 March. The changes will see the departure of several presenters, including Simon Bates and Lynn Parsons, while Andrew Castle, Kate Garraway and Myleene Klass will join the lineup. Castle will be the station's new breakfast presenter in London, while Garraway will take over Parsons' mid-morning show. Klass will present a weekend show.
  - 24 March
    - Smooth Radio returns to airing local output on its regional frequencies, with local programming for Breakfast and Drivetime, and a raft of new presenters joining the network.
    - Smooth Radio replaces Gold on MW across southern England.
  - 6 April – Smooth Radio launches a multi-million ad campaign featuring Michael Bublé.
  - 15 November – Smooth Christmas returns to DAB in preparation for the launch of a new station with the Smooth brand.
  - 27 December – Launch of Smooth Extra on DAB.
- 2015
  - 15 May – Smooth Berkshire and North Hampshire closes.
- 2016
  - 19 February – Smooth Bristol and Bath closes because the land which houses the transmitter is sold to developers.
  - 1 June – A previous jingle package produced for Smooth Radio has been re-recorded for the United Arab Emirates station 92 Smooth by Salford-based Ignight Jingles.
- 2017
  - 1 October – Smooth Radio hires former Magic presenter Gary Vincent to present its evening programme. He succeeds Chris Skinner from 2 October, as Chris himself leaves the station and as Gary himself joins the station.
- 2018
  - 5 March – Following Global Radio's purchase of Lakeland Radio from the CN Group, the station is relaunched as Smooth Lake District at 6am.
  - 18 March – Andrew Castle presents his final show as he leaves the station, he is replaced the following week by Gary Vincent.
  - 28 May – Smooth Radio launches The Smooth Late Show, a nightly show that is presented by Martin Collins on weekdays and Danny Pietroni at weekends.
- 2019
  - 26 February – Global Radio announces plans to replace the regional breakfast shows on Capital, Heart and Smooth with a single national breakfast show for each network. Capital's new breakfast show will launch in April, with the others following later in the year. The number of regional drivetime shows will also be reduced.
  - 1 March – Launch of Smooth Country.
  - August – Nikki Bedi joins.
  - 2 September – Smooth's networked Drivetime show, presented by Angie Greaves, launches. At the same time, the number of breakfast shows drops to seven.
  - 3 September
    - Smooth Country gets its first carriage on DAB multiplexes.
    - Smooth Chill launches, replacing the long-standing Chill radio station.

== 2020s ==
- 2020
  - 3 January – Jenni Falconer joins to present Smooth Breakfast for London and nationwide on Smooth Extra.
  - 12 March – Smooth Extra ceases broadcasting at midnight, it is replaced by a full-time national 'Smooth UK' feed.
  - 16 October – Smooth Radio switches off its mediumwave frequencies in Cardiff and Newport because the site from which they are transmitted is being redeveloped.
  - 3 November – Smooth Radio switches off its mediumwave frequencies in Luton and Bedford.
- 2021
  - 17 July – Former Sky Sports News presenter Kirsty Gallacher joins to present the Saturday afternoon show.
- 2022
  - No events.
- 2023
  - 25 January – Smooth Radio undergoes a "brand refresh", with a new logo and strapline. "Your relaxing music mix" is replaced by "Always the best music". The refresh sees Smooth start to play a broader range of classic hits.
  - 30 June – As part of Global Radio's strategy to switch of its mediumwave frequencies, Smooth Radio's AM frequencies in Dorset, Essex, Gloucestershire, Norfolk, Suffolk, Wiltshire and Plymouth are switched off.
- 2024
  - 8 January – Another new spin-off station, Smooth Relax, launches. The station occupies the space on Digital One which had become available following the conversion of Classic FM to DAB+ the prior week. Smooth Relax reuses the format and slogan of "Your relaxing music mix", previously used by the main Smooth Radio network.
- 12 September
  - Smooth 70s returns. The station broadcasts on DAB in London.
  - Global launches a new Smooth decades station, Smooth 80s, broadcasting on the semi-national Sound Digital multiplex. Also launching on this day are Smooth Soul and Smooth 70s, which broadcast in London.
- 25 September – Global relaunches Smooth Christmas on Global Player.
- 2025
  - 21 February – Smooth stations in England broadcast local and regional programming for the final time.
  - 24 February – Jenni Falconer presents the first national Smooth Breakfast, replacing the regional breakfast programmes in England.
