= Smooth North West =

Coordinates: 53.480543°N 2.253398°W

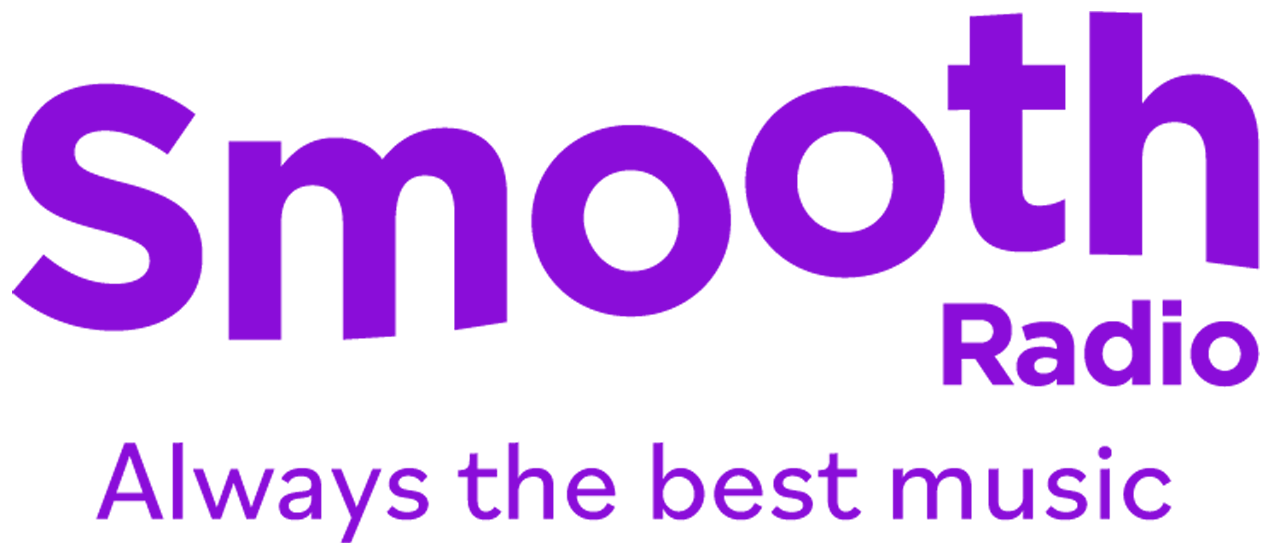
- Manchester; England
- Broadcast area: North West England
- Frequencies: FM: 100.4 MHz (Winter Hill); DAB: 10C Liverpool; 12A Lancashire; 12C Manchester
- Branding: Always The Best Music for the North West

Programming
- Format: Jazz/soul/R&B
- Network: Smooth Radio

Ownership
- Owner: Communicorp UK
- Operator: Global
- Sister stations: Capital Manchester and Lancashire, Heart North West, Radio X 90s

History
- First air date: 1 September 1994 (as Jazz FM); 2 March 2004 (as Smooth FM); 26 March 2007 (as Smooth Radio 100.4)

Links
- Website: Smooth North West

Smooth North West is a regional radio station owned by Communicorp UK and operated by Global as part of the Smooth network. The station broadcasts to the North West of England from studios at Spinningfields in Manchester.

== History ==
=== GMG Radio ownership ===
The station was launched by Radio Investments Ltd on 1 September 1994 as Jazz FM, but was also known as JFM in an attempt to appeal to listeners who could be put off by the use of the word "jazz". Jazz FM originally played a wide variety of jazz, pandering to more smooth jazz during the daytime in order to attract the 25- to 45-year-old target market which was required to make the station a success. However, the focus of the music later changed, and by the early 2000s, it was focusing more on soul and softer R&B alongside jazz.

100.4 Jazz FM broadcast its daytime shows from its Manchester station, but specialist shows such as Dinner Jazz and Legends of Jazz with Ramsey Lewis were networked from its London sister station 102.2 Jazz FM.

In 2003, the Guardian Media Group did extensive research into the type of music that listeners in the north-west wanted to hear. They concluded that many people were dissuaded by the name "jazz", and as a result, 100.4 Jazz FM closed on 13 February 2004 and relaunched as Smooth FM on 2 March 2004.

The station now began to play more modern music during the day, but continued a mostly jazz themed output at night. The arrangements for local and networked programming remained for a time, but from March 2005, only Mike Chadwick's The Saturday Night Experience was networked from 102.2 Smooth FM. All other programming was produced and aired in the North West.

The station was relaunched again as Smooth Radio 100.4 on 26 March 2007. The launch occurred at the same time as London based 102.2 Smooth FM, however Smooth Radio 100.4 continued with its own unique soul music based format. On 5 July 2007, GMG Radio announced that it was requesting a change of format from Ofcom, which would bring Smooth Radio 100.4 in line with the rest of the network. It proposed an easy listening music service mixed with speech for the over 50's, coupled with an improved local news service. Ofcom approved the changes on 11 October 2007.

In March 2008, GMG requested a format change to remove its jazz commitments it has in place for Smooth Radio 100.4. Part of the plans included a relaunch of Jazz FM from the jazzfm.com service broadcasting on DAB in Glasgow and online on the MXR North West multiplex. In a meeting on 22 April 2008 Ofcom denied GMG's request to drop its jazz commitments. GMG said that it would be relaunching Jazz FM despite the decision.

Local and networked programming originated from studios at Laser House in Salford Quays.

In 2010, GMG announced that it would be merging its five Smooth stations in England to create a nationwide Smooth Radio service based in Salford. The new station was launched on 4 October 2010 and could be heard both on DAB and on the locally on the FM frequencies.

=== Global Radio franchisee under Communicorp ownership ===
Smooth Radio's output was relocated to new owner Global's Leicester Square headquarters from 1 October 2013, a move that coincided with a major overhaul of its schedule, and the closure of Smooth 70s after 21 months on air.

Global reached an agreement to sell Smooth North West and seven others to Communicorp, as part of a plan to allay competition fears following Global's purchase of GMG Radio.

On 4 February 2014, the Radio Today website reported that Ofcom had given Global permission to remove Smooth from the Digital One platform, and to replace it with a service playing music from the 1970s, 80s and 90s. Under this agreement, Smooth would continue to broadcast on its regional frequencies, but would be required to provide seven hours of local output on weekdays (four hours at weekends) and a regional news service.

In May 2017, local programming moved from Salford to new studios at the XYZ building in the Spinningfields district of Manchester City Centre. Smooth North West shares facilities with sister station Radio X 90s and two Global-owned stations, Heart North West and Capital Manchester and Lancashire.

In September 2019, following OFCOM's decision to relax local content obligations from commercial radio, Smooth's local Drivetime and weekend shows were replaced by network programming from London. Local news bulletins, traffic updates and advertising were retained, alongside the station's North West breakfast show.

On 24 February 2025 a fully networked schedule of programming across all Smooth Radio stations in England was reinstated, with the London-based breakfast show hosted by Jenni Falconer rolled out to the stations in place of local/regional morning programmes; split localised news and advertising were retained. Smooth North West breakfast host at the time, Darren Parks, was retained by Smooth Radio and appointed to host the networked Smooth Sanctuary strand on weekday evenings.

== Programming ==
The Smooth Sanctuary with Darren Parks is produced and broadcast from Global's Manchester studios from 7 pm to 10 pm on weekdays, for broadcast across the Smooth Radio network. Other networked programming originates from Global's London headquarters, including Smooth Breakfast with Jenni Falconer and The Smooth Drive Home with Angie Greaves.

=== News ===
Global's Newsroom broadcasts hourly regional news bulletins from 6am-7pm on weekdays and 6am-12pm at weekends. The bulletins are produced for Communicorp by Global's Manchester newsroom.

National news updates air hourly from Global's London headquarters at all other times.

== Former notable presenters ==
- Emma B
- Simon Bates (now at Boom Radio)
- Tony Blackburn (now at BBC Radio 2)
- Carlos (now at Heart 70s)
- Daryl Denham (now at BBC Radio Kent)
- Mark Goodier (now at BBC Radio 2)
- David Jensen (now at Boom Radio)
- Lynn Parsons (now at Magic Radio)
- Andy Peebles
- David Prever (later at BBC Radio Oxford)
- Pat Sharp (later at Greatest Hits Radio)
- Pete Waterman
