= Smooth London =

English regional radio station

Coordinates: 51.517107°N 0.163374°W

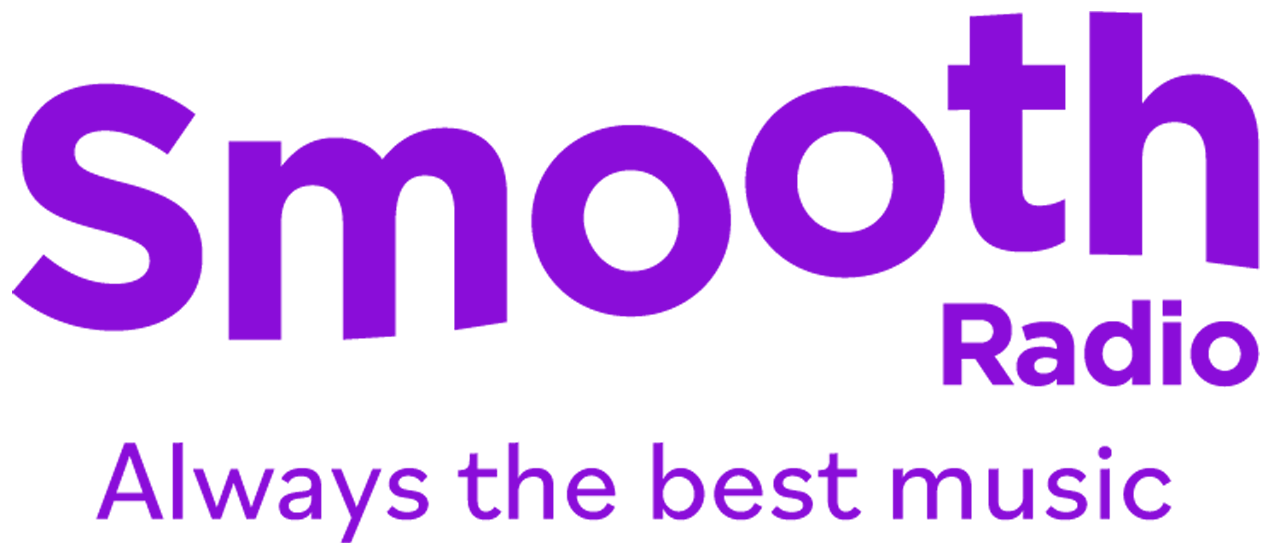

London; England
- Broadcast area: Greater London
- Frequencies: FM: 102.2 MHz; DAB: 12C
- RDS: SMOOTH
- Branding: Always The Best Music For London

Programming
- Format: Soft Adult Contemporary
- Network: Smooth Radio

Ownership
- Owner: Global
- Sister stations: Capital London; Capital Xtra; Classic FM; Heart London; LBC; LBC News; Radio X Gold

History
- First air date: 26 March 2007

Links
- Website: Smooth London

Smooth London is a regional radio station owned and operated by Global as part of the Smooth Radio network. It broadcasts to the Greater London area from Croydon transmitting station on 102.2 MHz. It broadcasts a soft adult contemporary radio format from Global's studios in Leicester Square, London, and replaced 102.2 Smooth FM on 26 March 2007.

== History ==
=== GMG Radio ownership ===
The station launched on 4 March 1990 as Jazz FM, playing mainly soul and jazz music. It was relaunched in June 2005 as 102.2 Smooth FM, playing middle of the road music, soul and R&B during the day and, as part of its licence requirements, focused on jazz music at night. On 20 October 2006, GMG Radio announced that it was requesting a change of format for 102.2 Smooth FM from Ofcom, moving the station away from its daytime soul and R&B remit which had, until that point, formed an integral part of the licence. GMG proposed an easy listening music service mixed with speech for the over 50s, coupled with an improved local news service. Ofcom approved the changes on 8 December 2006, with the condition that GMG retained the 45 hours of jazz per week that constituted part of the former licence requirement.

As a result of the format change, GMG agreed to adhere to a minimum of 20% of its music during daytime being over 40 years old, to distance the station from its London rivals Magic and Heart 106.2.

In March 2008, GMG requested a format change to remove the 45-hour jazz commitment it has in place for 102.2 Smooth Radio. Part of the plans included a relaunch of Jazz FM from the jazzfm.com service (at the time broadcasting on DAB in Glasgow and online) onto a DAB multiplex in London. In a meeting on 22 April 2008 Ofcom denied GMG's request to drop its jazz commitments. GMG, under licence to The Local Radio Company relaunched Jazz FM despite the decision.

On 6 October 2008 Smooth Radio was removed from the MXR Wales and West multiplex to allow for the relaunch of Jazz FM. Although initially, Real Radio was removed, Smooth Radio was removed and Real restored on the multiplex. It replaced Jazz FM in South Wales and returned to DAB.

Local programming originated from studios in London. Networked programming was syndicated from sister station Smooth North West at Salford Quays, Manchester.

In 2010 GMG announced that it would be merging its five Smooth stations in England to create a nationwide Smooth Radio service based in Manchester. The new station was launched on 4 October 2010 and could be heard both on DAB and on the locally on the FM frequencies.

=== Global Radio ownership ===
Smooth Radio's output was relocated to new owner Global's Leicester Square headquarters from 1 October 2013, a move that coincided with a major overhaul of its schedule, and the closure of Smooth 70s after 21 months on air.

On 4 February 2014, the Radio Today website reported that Ofcom had given Global permission to remove Smooth from the Digital One platform, and to replace it with a service playing music from the 1970s, 80s and 90s. Under this agreement, Smooth still continues to broadcast on its regional frequencies, but would be required to provide seven hours of local output per day.

== Programming ==
As of 22 February 2025, programming is broadcast and produced from Global's London headquarters, or studios in Birmingham and Manchester.

Smooth London also broadcasts hourly news bulletins 24 hours a day from Global's London newsroom, including networked overnight and weekend updates on the hour.

== Presenters as of 2025 ==
- Paul Hollins
- Gary King
- Jenni Falconer
- Kate Garraway
- Paul Phear
- Angie Greaves
- Gary Vincent
- Martin Collins
- Simon Clarke
- Eamonn Kelly
- Myleene Klass
- Danny Pietroni
- Tina Hobley
- Margherita Taylor
- Philip Chryssikos
- Adil Ray
- Darren Parks

=== Former presenters ===
- Andrew Castle (now Wimbledon Commentator)
- Anthony Davis
- Russ Williams (now with Nation Radio UK)
- Nikki Bedi (now with BBC Radio 4 and the BBC World Service)
- Kirsty Gallagher (Now on Gold Radio)

== See also ==
- Timeline of Smooth Radio
