= 100.4 Jazz FM =

100.4 Jazz FM (defunct)

England
- Broadcast area: North West (FM/DAB)
- Frequency: 100.4 MHz

Programming
- Format: Jazz

Ownership
- Owner: GMG Radio

History
- First air date: 1 September 1994
- Last air date: 13 February 2004

Links
- Website: jazzfm.com

100.4 Jazz FM (launched as JFM 100.4) was an Independent Local Radio station for the North West England playing jazz music. 100.4 Jazz FM played its own music from its Salford studio during the day, whereas specialist shows like Dinner Jazz and Legends of Jazz with Ramsey Lewis were networked from London's 102.2 Jazz FM. The station was replaced by Smooth FM 100.4 in 2004.

== History ==
In 1993, Golden Rose Communications was awarded the regional FM licence for the North West, beating ten other applications for the licence. Jazz FM was launched as JFM on 1 September 1994 and broadcast from Exchange Quays, in Salford, England. It was originally known as JFM in order to try to appeal to more listeners who were put off by the "jazz" in Jazz FM. The station name reverted to Jazz FM, a decision also made to its sister London station in 1995 when Richard Wheatly became chief executive officer for Golden Rose Communications. Jazz FM originally played a wide variety of jazz, pandering to more smooth jazz during the daytime to attract the 25- to 45-year-old target market Jazz FM needed to make the station a success. The station before the rebrand, however, played more soul and softer R&B alongside jazz.

In 2003, the Guardian Media Group did extensive research into the type of music the listeners in the north-west wanted to listen to. They concluded that many people were put off by the name "jazz" in the station name. As a result, 100.4 Jazz FM closed on 13 February 2004 and relaunched as 'Smooth FM' on 1 March 2004.

Smooth FM 100.4 relaunched as Smooth Radio 100.4 in March 2007 at the same time as London based 102.2 Smooth FM.

=== Return to the airwaves ===
Hierarchy of Jazz FM from 1990 to present

On 28 February 2008, GMG Radio's chief executive John Myers made an announcement that Jazz FM would be brought back in the North West, London and the West Midlands on DAB. Myers also said that he believed it would make more sense for there to be a dedicated radio station for jazz listeners than the commitments to play jazz on Smooth Radio 100.4, as required by the licence granted to them by Ofcom. The closure of theJazz on Digital One was also part of the reason for the return of Jazz FM. The relaunch of jazzfm.com, under a three-year deal with The Local Radio Company happened on 6 October 2008.

== See also ==
- Jazz FM (UK)
- Smooth FM 100.4
- 102.2 Jazz FM
- 102.2 Smooth FM
