= Jazz FM =

Jazz FM may refer to:

- Jazz FM (Bulgaria), a radio station in Bulgaria that started in 2001
- Jazz FM (UK), a digital jazz radio station in the United Kingdom
- 102.2 Jazz FM, a defunct radio station based in London, England
- 100.4 Jazz FM, a defunct radio station based in Manchester, England
- Arrow Jazz FM, a radio station based in Amsterdam, the Netherlands
- CJRT-FM, a radio station known as "Jazz FM 91" and online as "Jazz.fm" based in Toronto, Ontario, Canada
- WMCE-FM, an FM jazz station formerly known as "JAZZ FM", in Erie, Pennsylvania
