= Smooth Radio (2010) =

Former British national radio station

- United Kingdom
- Broadcast area: United Kingdom: National (DAB); North West, London, West Midlands, North East, Scotland & East Midlands (FM & DAB)
- Frequencies: FM 100.4 MHz (North West), 101.4 MHz (Derby), 102.2 MHz (London), 105.7 MHz (West Midlands), 97.5 MHz (North East), 105.2 MHz (Glasgow), 106.6 MHz (East Midlands); DAB – 11D (England & Wales) – 12A (Scotland) – 12A (West Midlands) – 12C (North West) – 12C (North East) – 12C (Nottinghamshire); Sky: 0128; Virgin Media: 916; Freeview: 718; Freesat: 732

Programming
- Format: Adult contemporary

Ownership
- Owner: Global Radio
- Sister stations: Real Radio; Real Radio XS

History
- First air date: As Jazz FM; 4 March 1990; As Smooth Radio; 4 October 2010

Links
- Website: www.smoothradio.co.uk

From 2010 to 2014, Smooth Radio was an independent, commercial, national radio station in the United Kingdom. Owned by Real and Smooth—a company formerly known as GMG Radio—the station was aimed at the over-40 demographic, and competed for its audience with BBC Radio 2. It was broadcast on the DAB Digital Radio Digital 1 national multiplex, Sky, Freesat, Freeview, Virgin Media, online and on regional FM and DAB frequencies in the North West, London, North East, West Midlands, Scotland and East Midlands. Nationally the station attracted a weekly average audience of 3 million.

The station opened in 1990 as 102.2 Jazz FM in London, and a second Jazz FM branded station was launched four years later in Manchester. The Manchester station became Smooth FM 100.4 in 2004, and was the first in the network of independent local radio stations to use the Smooth brand. The London station followed suit a year later. The network's parent company, GMG Radio – a subsidiary of the Guardian Media Group – acquired the Saga Radio Group in the mid-2000s, and all Saga stations were given the Smooth name. After the publication of John Myers' recommendations of a regulatory overhaul in commercial radio, and the passing of the Digital Economy Act 2010 allowing stations to co-locate or discontinue local shows and broadcasts, Smooth Radio merged its five English stations into a single, quasi-national station in October 2010; local news feeds were produced at GMG Radio's headquarters in Salford Quays. 105.2 Smooth Radio in Scotland produced its own breakfast and drivetime shows, but carried networked programming at other times. As part of their licence agreement, the London and Manchester stations were required to continue their commitment to jazz music after dropping the Jazz FM name, and the UK's broadcasting industry regulator Office of Communications (Ofcom) stipulated they must broadcast 45 hours of jazz programming per week, but this requirement was ended shortly before the merger took place.

Smooth recruited many well-known British radio personalities to its line-up. Presenters on the network included Emma B, Simon Bates, Tony Blackburn, Mark Goodier, David Jensen and Chris Tarrant. The station's flagship breakfast show was presented by Simon Bates, who left Classic FM after more than a decade. It broadcast occasional documentaries on subjects relating to music, news and media events; some of these won the station radio industry awards. In November 2011 Smooth launched a second station on the Digital One platform dedicated to Christmas music, and later replaced this with "Smooth 70s", which played music from the 1970s. The Christmas station returned in 2012, and Smooth 70s closed in September 2013. Along with its sister station, Real Radio, Smooth was an official host of the Blackpool Illuminations switch-on ceremony from 2010, and staged regular, free live music events. The station signed a number of sponsorship deals with companies such as Tetley Tea and ATS Euromaster, and held annual fundraising events in aid of the charities Help for Heroes and Macmillan Cancer Support.

GMG Radio was taken over by rival Global Radio in June 2012. Global's purchase of the company was referred to Ofcom, the Office of Fair Trading and the Competition Commission amid concerns that Global's market share may be disproportionately large as a result of the deal, and consequently not in the public interest. GMG Radio subsequently changed its name to Real and Smooth Radio Ltd. A report issued by the Competition Commission in May 2013 highlighted competitiveness issues and recommended a full or partial sale of Real and Smooth. Real and Smooth Radio Ltd and Global continued to operate as separate companies while the takeover was investigated. Smooth moved its operations from Manchester to Global's London headquarters in October 2013. In February 2014, Global were given permission to remove Smooth from the Digital One platform and replace it with another station. Global also sold eight of its regional stations, including three operated under the Smooth brand, and announced that Smooth would replace much of its Gold network on the medium wave frequency. The Smooth brand was relaunched as a network of regional stations in March 2014.

== History ==
=== Early years as Jazz FM ===
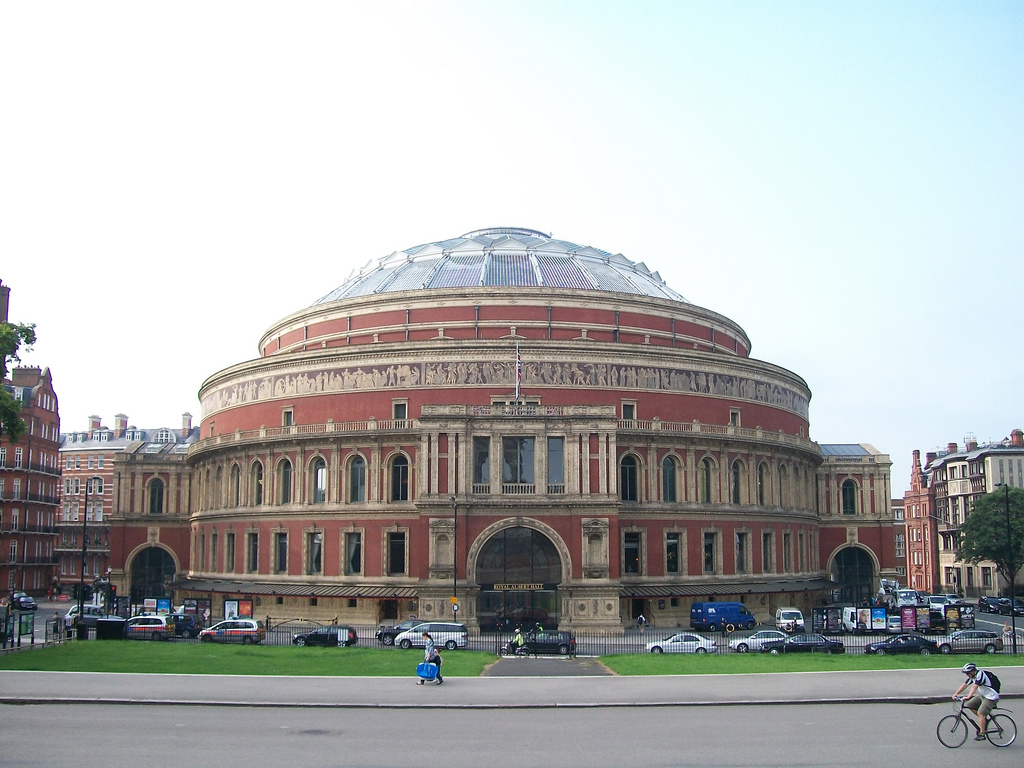
London's Royal Albert Hall was the venue for Jazz FM's launch night which featured a performance by Ella Fitzgerald.

London station 102.2 Jazz FM was launched on 4 March 1990 with a concert performed by Ella Fitzgerald at the Royal Albert Hall. Jazz FM played mainly soul and jazz music and was broadcast to the London area. A sister station in Manchester called 100.4 Jazz FM was launched on 1 September 1994. The Jazz FM stations were purchased by the Guardian Media Group in 2002, and became part of the company's radio division, GMG Radio Holdings Ltd.

In 2003, GMG radio conducted market research into the type of music that listeners in the north-west of England wanted to hear on the radio. The study concluded that many people were dissuaded by the name Jazz, and as a result, 100.4 Jazz FM closed on 13 February 2004 and relaunched as Smooth FM on 1 March. In 2005, GMG rebranded the London station 102.2 Smooth FM. The two renamed stations played middle of the road music, soul and R&B during the day and as part of their licence requirements, jazz music at night.

On 20 October 2006, GMG Radio announced that it was requesting a change of format for 102.2 and 100.4 Smooth FM from Ofcom, to remove the stations' daytime soul and R&B licence commitments. GMG Radio proposed an easy listening music service mixed with speech for the over 50s, and an improved local news service. Ofcom approved the changes on 8 December 2006, with the condition that GMG retained the 45 hours of jazz per week that constituted part of the former licence requirement. As a result of the format change and to distance the station from its London rivals Magic and Heart 106.2, GMG Radio agreed that a minimum of 20% of its daytime music output would be over 40 years old.

=== Change of identity and expansion ===
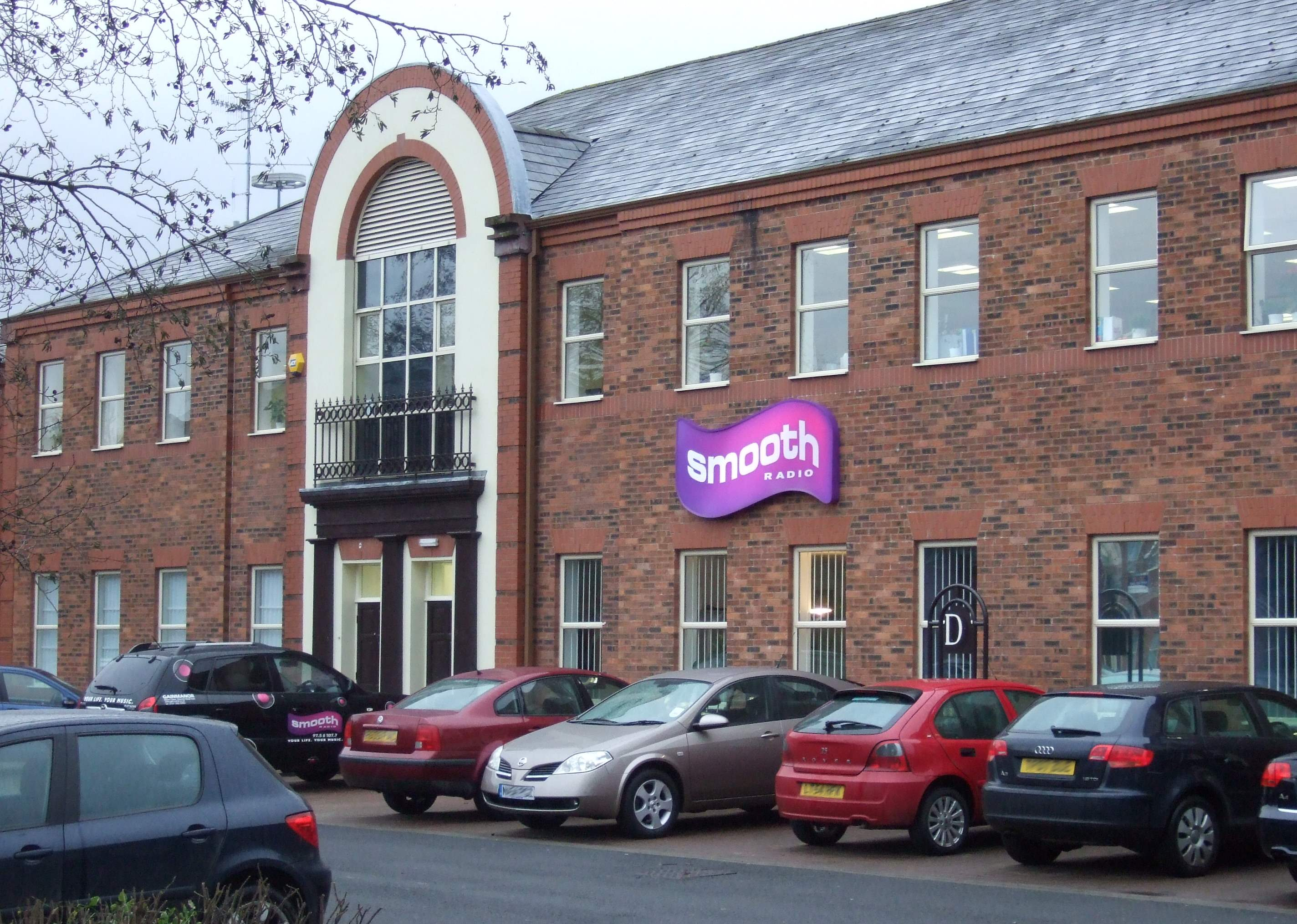
The former studios of 97.5 Smooth Radio in Gateshead, Tyne and Wear, seen here in January 2008 shortly after it went on air. The station was broadcast to the north-east of England.

In December 2006, GMG Radio acquired the Saga Radio Group, which owned stations in the West Midlands, East Midlands and Scotland, and a licence to begin broadcasting to the North East, and expanded the Smooth Network. Along with the Smooth FM stations in London and Manchester, all Saga stations were relaunched under the Smooth Radio brand on 26 March 2007. Saga 105.7 FM in the West Midlands became 105.7 Smooth Radio, Saga 106.6 FM in the East Midlands became 106.6 Smooth Radio and Glasgow based Saga 105.2 FM became 105.2 Smooth Radio. A service for the north-east of England, 97.5 Smooth Radio, was launched in January 2008. To begin with, most programming for these stations was produced locally and some shows were networked from London. However, Smooth gradually increased its networked programming until most content was originated in London or Manchester.

In March 2008, GMG Radio requested that Ofcom remove the 45-hour jazz commitment for its London and Manchester stations. The company planned to relaunch Jazz FM from the jazzfm.com service which broadcast on DAB in Glasgow, online and on a DAB multiplex in London. In a meeting on 22 April 2008, Ofcom declined the request. GMG relaunched Jazz FM despite having to retain the jazz commitment.

The decrease of local output lead to criticism from Norman Quirk, the former managing director of Saga 105.2 FM in Glasgow, after GMG Radio dismissed six Scottish presenters in August 2008 in favour of increased networked content from its stations in London and Manchester. The station had operated a 24-hour schedule of local programming. Quirk labelled the dismissals "disgraceful" and expressed his fears that the station would not be able to serve the needs and interests of the Scottish people as well as Saga had done.

=== Further expansion ===
After John Myers' recommendations of a regulatory overhaul in commercial radio were published, and the Digital Economy Act 2010 allowing stations to co-locate or discontinue local shows and to broadcast on national DAB was passed, Smooth Radio merged its five English stations into one quasi-national station, and local news feeds were produced from GMG Radio's headquarters in Salford Quays. GMG Radio announced on 29 June 2010 that it wanted to compete with BBC Radio 2 by broadcasting on the Digital One multiplex on DAB to the whole of England and Wales, and Sky, Freesat, Freeview, Virgin Media and online. Regional content would be kept; split news, travel and weather bulletins would be broadcast on the FM and regional DAB stations in the North East, North West, West Midlands and East Midlands. Listeners in London and those tuning to the national output would hear national information. 105.2 Smooth Radio in Scotland would keep its local breakfast and drivetime programmes because of the rules governing its broadcast licence, but networked content would be broadcast the rest of the time. The jazz commitments for London and the North West were also ended. The new Smooth Radio was launched on 4 October 2010 with most of the output originating from Salford Quays, and other programming coming from London.

On 1 November 2011, GMG Radio launched "Smooth Christmas" on the Digital One multiplex, a dedicated station playing only Christmas music with no news or advertisements. It promoted Smooth Radio and broadcast until 27 December 2011. Smooth Christmas was replaced on a trial basis by Smooth 70s, playing tracks from the 1970s. The station was warmly received by listeners, and in January 2012 GMG Radio confirmed a deal with US syndication firm Premiere Networks to air 1970s editions of the American Top 40 show presented by Casey Kasem, which would be broadcast at weekends. Smooth 70s' weekday programming included Disco Lunch and Late Night Love Songs. Due to its popularity, Smooth Christmas was relaunched in November 2012 on the Digital One multiplex alongside Smooth 70s.

=== New ownership ===
In June 2012 it was reported that Guardian Media Group was seeking to sell GMG Radio in order to restructure itself to stem losses being made by The Guardian and The Observer newspapers. Several offers were received for the subsidiary, valuing it at £50 million. GMG Radio was sold to Global Radio on 25 June, at an estimated price of between £50 million and £70 million. (Note: A financial report released by Global Radio in December 2013 indicates the company paid £69m for its purchase of GMG.) Global renamed GMG Radio "Real and Smooth Radio Ltd." Several rival radio groups expressed their concerns over the takeover and the effect it could have on commercial radio in the UK. The deal prompted speculation about the possible disappearance of the Smooth Radio brand as a result of a possible merger with Global's Gold network, which was aimed at a similar audience. It was announced that in the short term GMG Radio and Global would continue to operate as separate entities while a review of the sale was carried out by Ofcom.

On 3 August the Culture Secretary Jeremy Hunt instructed Ofcom and the Office of Fair Trading (OFT) to examine Global Radio's purchase of GMG, which gave Global over 50% of the UK radio market because of concerns the takeover may not be in the public interest. On 11 October, the OFT agreed to fast-track the investigation. Hunt's successor Maria Miller said the deal would not be investigated for media plurality. The OFT concluded that the merger could lead to a rise in local advertising costs because of the decrease in competitors, and forwarded the matter to the Competition Commission, which oversees business mergers and takeovers. On the same day the Competition Commission announced it would publish its findings into the takeover by 27 March 2013.

On 21 February 2013, the Competition Commission confirmed it would delay its decision until May, and issued a statement in which it said, "The range of possible remedies to be considered in this case is complex and that all possible remedies need to be explored with the parties to the merger and third parties". The Commission published its final report into the acquisition on 21 May, requiring Global to sell radio stations in seven locations. (Note: The stations involved were: Smooth or Capital (East Midlands); Real or Capital (South Wales); Real or Heart (North Wales); Capital or Real XS with either Real or Smooth (North West); Real or Smooth or Capital (North East); Real or Capital (Yorkshire); and Real or Capital (Scotland)) On 14 June, it was reported that Global would appeal against the commission's decision. A date for the appeal was subsequently scheduled for October. Following the hearing, in November, the Competition Appeal Tribunal rejected Global's appeal, meaning it would have to sell some stations in order to complete the takeover. Global announced in December that it would not appeal the decision, and would instead begin the process of selling the assets as directed by the commission.

Global announced on 12 August 2013 that Real and Smooth would relocate their London and West Midlands offices to Global premises. Smooth Radio's output was relocated to Global's Leicester Square headquarters from 1 October, a move that coincided with a major overhaul of its schedule, and the closure of Smooth 70s after 21 months on air. On 4 February 2014, the Radio Today website reported that Ofcom had given Global Radio permission to remove Smooth from the Digital One platform, and to replace it with a service playing music from the 1970s, 80s and 90s. Under this agreement, Smooth would continue to broadcast on its regional frequencies, but would be required to provide seven hours of local output per day. On 6 February, Global confirmed the sale of eight of its regional stations—including those with the Smooth Radio brand in the North West, North East and East Midlands—to the Irish media holdings company Communicorp. (Note: The eight stations were Smooth Radio North West, Smooth Radio North East, Smooth Radio East Midlands, Capital South Wales, Real Radio North Wales, Capital Scotland, Real Radio Yorkshire and Real XS Manchester.) Under a franchising agreement between the two firms, these stations would retain the Smooth Radio name, but relaunch airing a mixture of both regional content and networked programming from London. Smooth would also take over Gold's medium wave frequencies, except in London, Manchester and the East Midlands. Global announced later that month that Smooth would be relaunched from 3 March, and subsequently confirmed the Gold changes would take effect from 24 March, when the stations would begin simulcasting with Smooth Radio London. This also coincided with the return of local programming at breakfast and drivetime.

== Audience and ratings ==
Smooth Radio catered mainly for listeners over the age of 40, a similar audience to that of BBC Radio 2. Official quarterly audience figures collated by Radio Joint Authority Research Limited (RAJAR) show that the station had an average weekly audience of just over 3 million listeners. Figures for the third quarter of 2010, released in October 2010 showed that collectively, the six regional Smooth stations had a weekly audience of 3 million at the time Smooth became a national broadcaster. John Simons, Group Programme Director for GMG Radio said, "The scope for Smooth Radio is huge and we're looking forward to seeing this growth continue as more and more people discover the station across the UK. We firmly believe Smooth has the potential to become the UK's biggest national commercial station and these figures show it's heading in the right direction!"

During the final quarter of 2010 – the station's first as a national broadcaster – listening figures rose to 3.08 million, which remained unchanged in the first quarter of 2011, although listenership in London increased by 29%, largely because of the arrival of Simon Bates on the breakfast show in January 2011. Smooth continued to increase its audience share in the second quarter of 2011, with an average weekly total of 3.2 million, which rose once again in the third quarter to 3.328 million, meaning that for the first time Smooth's figures overtook those of one of its national rivals, Talksport. The station had an audience of 3.3 million in the final quarter of 2011, making it the second most listened to national commercial radio station in the UK. 3,317,000 listeners were tuning in during the first quarter of 2012, which dropped slightly in the second quarter to 3.2 million. The third quarter of 2012 saw another small drop to 3.19 million, but in the same period Smooth 70s recorded its first audience figures of 749,000. Collectively 3.7 million listeners were tuning into Smooth-branded stations. That figure rose to 3.8 million in the final quarter of the year. The first quarter of 2013 saw an average weekly audience of 3.6 million, which fell to 3.1 million for the second quarter. However, figures rose again through the second half of the year, with 3.26 million in the third quarter of 2013, and 3.38 million in the fourth.

== Marketing and sponsorship ==
When Smooth Radio launched as a national network, GMG launched a hoarding and television advertising campaign featuring eight "Smooth Ambassadors" – listeners chosen to represent the station's "zest for life". Each advertisement included a piece of information about one of the ambassadors, and something they were currently doing. (Note: A typical example of a Smooth ambassador was Rachel Cook from the north east, who on one occasion had abseiled down the Tyne Bridge, and was at that point restoring a 1964 scooter.) The campaign ran throughout October and November 2010. A later campaign featured Simon Bates, whose breakfast show attracted increased listening figures in London in early 2011.

The station signed a number of sponsorship deals with advertisers, often for a particular show or for competitions associated with the advertiser. Its first major sponsorship deal was with Honda, which sponsored the drivetime show upon the station's launch. In July 2011 GMG signed a 13-week deal with gaming website Foxy Bingo to sponsor Smooth Radio's afternoon show, and a three-month deal with ATS Euromaster to sponsor the drivetime show began in September 2012. Real and Smooth announced a three-month deal with Sky Movies to sponsor Smooth's weekend film show, Smooth Radio at the Movies from February 2013.

As part of a three-month deal with Tetley Tea announced in October 2011, Smooth Radio's logo appeared on Tetley products sold in British supermarkets. In August 2011, GMG announced a deal with the magazine publisher IPC whereby Smooth Radio would sponsor the TV Times Awards. A trip to Kenya was given away in association with the Kenya Tourist Board in the lead up to the 2011 wedding of Prince William and Catherine Middleton; the winners would stay at the Lewa Wildlife Conservancy, where the royal couple became engaged. High Street retailer Boots UK launched The Feel Good Forum, a health and beauty lifestyle programme that began airing for an eight-week run on Real and Smooth from March 2013. The show, presented by Kate Thornton was a collaboration between the broadcaster, Boots and other partners, including the Mumsnet website. Some online content was also produced to supplement the programme. In July 2013, Real and Smooth secured a deal with the organisers of the 2014 Commonwealth Games to be the Official Media Partner for its Ticketing Campaign.

== Presenters and shows ==
=== Presenters ===
Presenters on the station included many notable British radio personalities. The breakfast show was hosted by Simon Bates, who joined the network in January 2011. Bates revived The Golden Hour and Our Tune, two popular features from his Radio 1 days. Emma B presented a Sunday afternoon show from March 2011. Paul Gambaccini presented a Saturday morning show, Peter Young both daytime and the specialist 'Soul Cellar', Paul Jones a blues show and Howard Pearce both weekend music shows and the stations 'live' football coverage of Chelsea F.C. games. The actress Tina Hobley became a Sunday morning presenter from October 2013. Others to join the station at that time include Paul Hollins who presented Smooth Radio's Movie Songs and Smooth Soul Sunday, Gary King who hosted a Sunday lunchtime show, and David Andrews with a Soul and Motown show on Sunday evenings. Former LBC 97.3 presenter Anthony Davis joined the station as its Drivetime presenter from January 2014.

Mark Goodier hosted a weekday mid-morning show from 2007 to 2012. Chris Tarrant was a Saturday morning presenter whose show was networked across several GMG stations in 2008. Also in 2008, Tony Blackburn presented a syndicated weekend breakfast show for Smooth. He left the station in October 2010 to present Pick of the Pops on BBC Radio 2 because the BBC would not allow him to continue working for a rival broadcaster. Andy Peebles was also a presenter with the station, having hosted his Andy Peebles Soul Train from 2004 to 2013, before moving the programme to Gold, another station owned by Global Radio. David "Kid" Jensen was a weekday presenter from April 2011 to December 2013.

=== Special programming and events ===
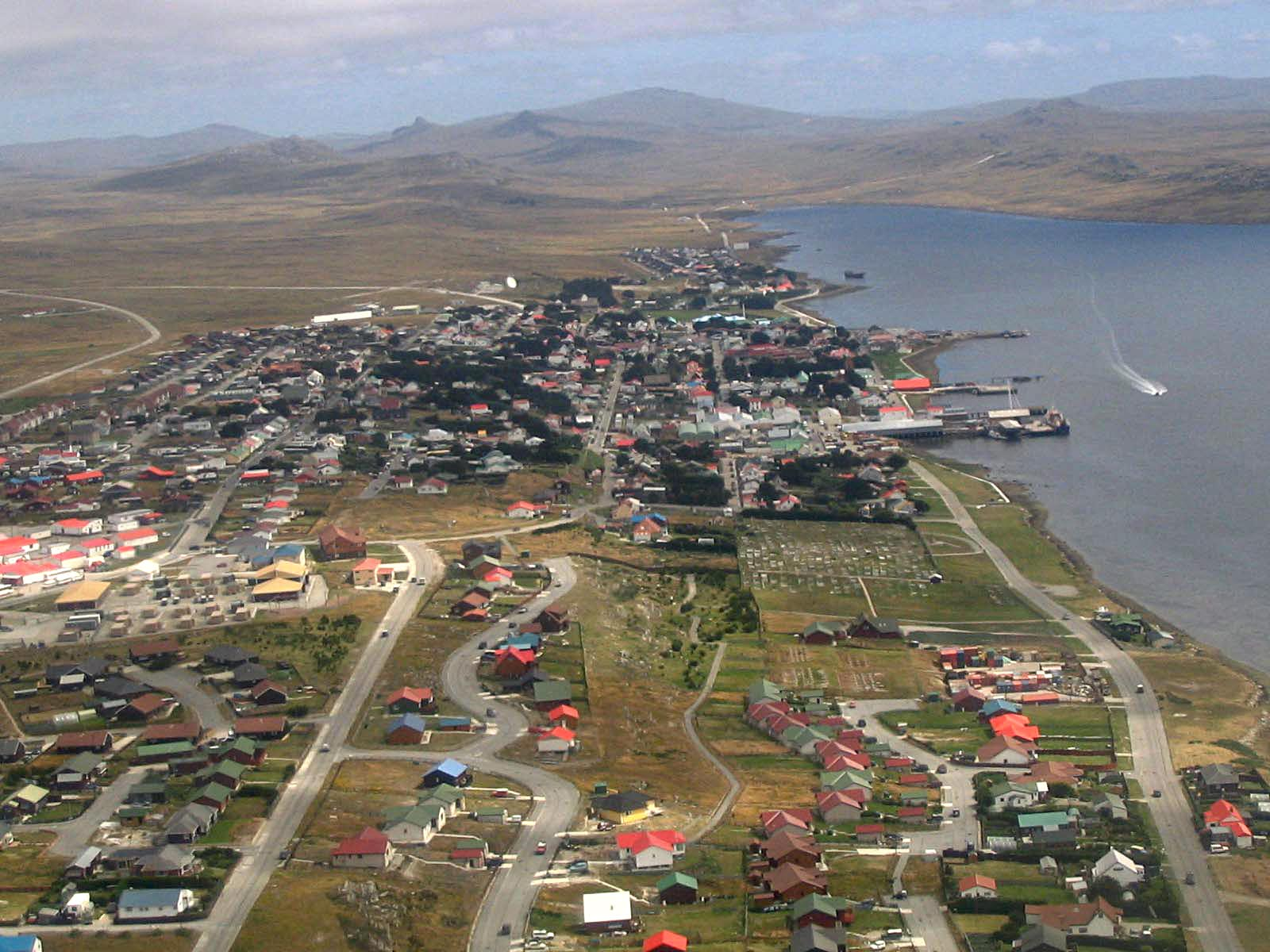
An aerial view of Stanley, capital of the Falkland Islands, seen here in 2005. In 2012, Simon Bates broadcast a week of programmes from the Islands to mark the 30th anniversary of the Falklands War.

25 July 2005 – London's 102.2 Smooth FM signed a three-year deal with premiership team Chelsea Football Club to provide exclusive 'live' match coverage of the club's games until the end of the 2007–08 season. Howard Pearce hosted the stations live football coverage of every Chelsea FC match during a time when Chelsea F.C. were Premiership Champions and Cup holders, this included them winning the first FA Cup final at the new Wembley Stadium. Howard worked alongside commentator Gary Taphouse and soccer legend Kerry Dixon 05/06 & 06/07 seasons.

In September 2011, Simon Bates presented a week of programmes from South Australia as part of a promotion in which the station gave away a holiday to the state. In December 2011, Bates travelled to Afghanistan to present a series of shows with British troops at Camp Bastion, which featured Christmas messages from British soldiers serving there to their friends and relatives. Bates discussed the possible future of Afghanistan as coalition forces prepared to hand over control to the Afghan National Army. On 8 April 2012, Easter Sunday, the forces broadcaster BFBS simulcast a two-hour show presented jointly by Bates and BFBS's Rachel Cochrane, with Smooth, allowing family and friends of serving troops to connect with their loved ones. On 27 May 2012, Bates presented a special programme ahead of the Thames Diamond Jubilee Pageant, previewing Elizabeth II's journey along the River Thames on the royal barge, Spirit of Chartwell. He was given special access to the vessel and spoke to the boat's owner, Philip Morrell and to composer Debbie Wiseman who was commissioned to write the music for the event. To commemorate the 30th anniversary of the end of the 1982 Falklands War, Bates broadcast the breakfast show from the Falkland Islands for a week; he explored the lives and experiences of Islanders and reflected on the conflict.

From 2010, Smooth and Real Radio were the official broadcaster of the switch-on ceremony for the Blackpool Illuminations, the broadcast rights to which it won from BBC Radio 2, which had aired it since 1997. 2010 was the first time the event was broadcast on commercial radio. The annual event was compered by presenters from the two stations at a purposely-built arena, and featured a music concert by popular artists. Performers in 2010 included Alesha Dixon, Gabriella Cilmi, The Wanted, Olly Murs, and Robbie Williams, who switched on the lights that year. The 2012 switch-on was performed by Greg Rutherford, Luke Campbell and Beth Tweddle—British Olympians who won gold medals at the 2012 Summer Olympics.

Smooth Radio hosted a series of free live music gigs titled Love Live Music held at venues around the UK. Featured artists included Adele, Beverley Knight, Eliza Doolittle, Katie Melua, Will Young, Nell Bryden, Honey Ryder, Paul Carrack, The Pierces, Roachford, Jack Savoretti and Leddra Chapman. On 4 October 2011 the station celebrated its first anniversary as a national broadcaster with a concert at London's Cafe de Paris. An evening of music and entertainment was held at Liverpool's Waterfront on 21 July 2012, which was attended by 20,000 people. A similar event was held in June 2013. Paul Carrack played at an event at Nottingham's Glee Club on 26 September 2012.

In December 2012 Real and Smooth secured exclusive broadcast rights to the "Christmas Hit Factory Live" concert, a show featuring artists and groups who achieved success with the Stock Aitken and Waterman and PWL record labels. Those appearing at the concert on 21 December included Kylie Minogue, Jason Donovan, Dead or Alive and Pat and Mick. It aired on New Year's Eve.

=== Charity fundraising ===
From 2009 GMG Radio stations, including Smooth Radio, held an annual fundraising day for Help for Heroes, a UK charity which provides help and support to injured British service personnel. The first "Help for Heroes Day" took place on 10 November 2009, and collectively the stations raised £200,000. The 18-hour special featured Ronan Keating, Simon Cowell, Spandau Ballet and The Soldiers, and Chris Tarrant returned to the network for the event. The second "Help for Heroes Day" in 2010 raised £350,000, bringing the accumulated total to £750,000. £255,000 was raised for the charity in 2012.

During the fundraising event "Smooth Radio Starlight Supper", listeners were encouraged to hold dinner parties at which guests donated money to a cancer charity. The event began in 2010 when the six stations in the Smooth network raised money for Breast Cancer Care in London, Macmillan Cancer Support in the North West, North East and West Midlands, the Rainbows Hospice for Children and Young People in the East Midlands and Marie Curie's Big Build in Glasgow. The 2011, 2012 and 2013 events raised money exclusively for Macmillan Cancer Support.

=== Documentaries ===
Smooth Radio occasionally broadcast documentaries about music and historic events, usually at weekends. Its first series of documentaries, broadcast in 2008, included a six-part series about music from America's Mississippi River region, titled Rolling River of Rock. A second series broadcast the following year included Live Fast Die Young about famous musicians who died before the age of 30, Legendary Labels about major record labels and From Cleethorpes to California about record producer Rod Temperton. The station's documentaries won a bronze award in the Programmes and Series Promotion category at the 2009 New York Festivals International Radio Program Awards.

In December 2010, the station celebrated the 50th anniversary of the television soap opera Coronation Street with a documentary titled Coronation Street at 50 and the station's Fallen Heroes won a Gold at the 2011 New York Festivals International Radio Awards. In March 2011 GMG Radio reporter Katie Collins travelled to Norway to interview Prince Harry as he prepared to join a group of injured ex-servicemen on a walk to the North Pole in aid of the charity Walking with the Wounded. The station also covered the walk; Collins was the only commercial radio journalist to interview the Prince on that occasion. The documentary won a Gold award for Best Documentary at the 2012 Sony Radio Academy Awards.

On the 10th anniversary of the September 11 attacks on the United States, Smooth aired a documentary featuring British people who were living in New York City at the time of the attacks. This was followed by live coverage of the remembrance service from Ground Zero, the former site of the World Trade Center, which was destroyed in the attacks.

In November 2012, Smooth confirmed it would air a documentary celebrating the life of Dusty Springfield over the Christmas period to mark the upcoming 50th anniversary of her debut as a solo artist. In January 2013, a Saturday programme dedicated to films and a regular documentary slot for Sunday afternoons were announced as part of an overhaul of the station's schedule. Mark Goodier returned to the network in June 2013 to present Rolling Home: The Summer of the Stones—a one-hour documentary about The Rolling Stones.

== Bibliography ==
- Myers, John (2012). Team, It's Only Radio. Kenton Books. ISBN 978-0954622398.
