= Russell Pockett =

British radio presenter

Russell Pockett is a radio presenter who has spent the majority of his career working for stations in the south of England.

Russell was heard on Radio Mercury from 1984 to 1997, later moving to Thames 107.8 as their weekday mid-morning presenter, also appearing on Star 106.6 in Slough. Pockett enjoyed a lengthy spell at Magic 105.4 as weekend breakfast presenter, later moving to a weekend evening slot, a role he retained for a short time whilst joining London rival Jazz FM in 2003 as weekday mid-morning host. He later moved to drivetime, where he remained on the rebranded 102.2 Smooth FM until March 2007, when a further rebrand to 102.2 Smooth Radio saw him replaced by ex-Virgin Radio presenter Martin Collins.

Russell was 102.2 Smooth Radio's interim weekday breakfast host for eight months from April 2007 while contractual difficulties prevented former Magic 105.4 presenter Graham Dene from joining the station before January 2008; he then moved to the weekend breakfast slot, but was replaced by Tony Blackburn.

He then went on to present in several different weekend slots at Smooth, before joining The Coast 106 on the South Coast as their drivetime presenter in January 2010. In February 2011 he left The Coast 106.
