= Lynn Parsons =

British DJ (born 1961)

- Born: 27 June 1961 (age 65)
- Presenting career
- Stations: Magic Radio (2016–present); Jazz FM (2014–2015); Smooth Radio (2007–2014); BBC Radio 2 (1998–2014); Virgin Radio (1996–1998); BBC Radio 1 (1991–1996); Capital London (1987–1991)
- Style: Presenter
- Country: United Kingdom
- Website: www.lynnparsons.net

Lynn Margaret Parsons (born 27 June 1961) is a British disc jockey.

== Career ==
Having graduated from college with an OND in electronic principles, Parsons started her career working in the television industry, where she was a sound engineer and later a vision mixer. She was a DJ on the pirate soul station JFM before moving to a Saturday night pop music programme at County Sound in Guildford. In radio, she joined London's Capital London in 1987 as a weeknight presenter, before moving to BBC Radio 1 in 1991. Initially she was an overnight presenter, but later hosted other shows, and during her time with the network she became the last person to interview the comedian Peter Cook. After leaving Radio 1, she joined Virgin Radio in 1996, spending two years as a presenter there.

In 1998, Parsons joined BBC Radio 2, taking over the Friday and Saturday overnight slot, where she remained as a full-time presenter until 2003. She was also briefly a presenter of the weekday late show during 1999 whilst fellow DJ Richard Allinson covered the drivetime slot. In 2001, Parsons' show received two hours of phone calls after rival Virgin Radio DJ Jon Holmes requested that his listeners call Parsons to request John Denver's Annie's Song be played. From 2003 she was a stand-in presenter on the network. She had her own early Sunday morning show on Radio 2 from January to April 2010, and later that year stood in for Sarah Kennedy after Kennedy was absent from her Dawn Patrol programme. It was announced on 3 September that Kennedy would not be returning to the network and that Parsons would continue to present the show until a shake up of the Radio 2 schedule in October. In January 2012 it was confirmed she would provide cover for the 6 – 8 am Saturday breakfast slot after Zoe Ball announced her decision to leave the show, and until another regular presenter was appointed.

She joined 102.2 Smooth Radio in London following its launch in March 2007, later becoming a presenter on its successor, Smooth Radio. In January 2008 she took over the station's afternoon slot following the death of fellow DJ Kevin Greening. From October 2010 she was the breakfast show presenter on the new national Smooth Radio, a role which was taken over by Simon Bates in January 2011. Parsons then returned to the weekend mid-morning show. In October 2012 Parsons was confirmed as the new host of the weekday mid morning show on Smooth, replacing Mark Goodier from December. She was later replaced as weekend presenter by David Prever. Parsons left Smooth Radio on 28 February 2014.

On 11 September 2014, the Radio Today website reported that Parsons would join Jazz FM to present the station's breakfast show, The Jazz Breakfast. She joined Jazz FM from 15 September as part of an overhaul of their schedule. She left Jazz FM in October 2015, and she joined Magic Radio in 2016.

Her hobbies and interests include Feng Shui, science, the paranormal, English literature, antiques and swimming. She is a regular participant in the 26 mile moonlight walkathon.
