= TheJazz =

British jazz digital radio station that started Christmas Day of 2006

theJazz
- United Kingdom
- Frequencies: Sky Digital: 0113; Virgin Media: 961

Programming
- Format: Jazz

Ownership
- Owner: GCap Media

History
- First air date: 25 December 2006
- Last air date: 31 March 2008

Links
- Website: thejazz.com

theJazz was a British jazz digital radio station run by GCap Media that started on Christmas Day of 2006 on Digital One, DAB ensemble, Sky Digital, Virgin Media, and the internet.

The station played blues and traditional and modern jazz and stopped broadcasting on 31 March 2008 on DAB. The station was a generic automated two-hour loop on Sky, Virgin, and online without disc jockeys. This was closed down and removed from Sky and Virgin on 3 November. Chill started on Digital TV using theJazz's old channel numbers on both Sky and Virgin.

== History ==
After the closing of PrimeTime Radio, Ofcom allowed a variation of the Digital One license to replace the requirement of an easy listening station to a classic and contemporary jazz requirement. On 19 September 2006, GCap released a press statement announcing the start of a national radio station before 2007.

TheJazz started test transmissions on all the platforms it would broadcast on in December 2006. The test transmissions consisted of Lindos Electronics test tones and an announcement of the forthcoming broadcast. Beginning in December 2007, it broadcast on DAB at a bit rate of 96 kbit/s in mono. This was increased to 128 kbit/s in joint stereo.

On 6 April 2007, the station started programming led by presenters. At 09:00, Darren Henley, managing director of Classic FM, opened theJazz. Helen Mayhew was the first voice heard on theJazz, introducing theJazz 500, a chart of jazz songs voted for by listeners. Presenters included Margherita Taylor, Jamie Cullum, David Jensen, Mike Chadwick, Anthony Davis, Digby Fairweather, Jacqui Dankworth, and Courtney Pine.

On 11 February 2008, GCap Media announced that unless a buyer was found, theJazz and its sister station Planet Rock would close at the end of March 2008. To compensate for the closing, Classic FM broadcast a nightly jazz program between midnight and 2 am, but that ceased in late September 2008 without warning. TheJazz stopped broadcasting at midnight, 31 March 2008 on DAB. The last song to be broadcast was "Don't Worry, Be Happy" by Bobby McFerrin followed by the beginning of "Tally Ho" by Don Byron.

== Services ==
=== Internet ===
GCap Media also stated that the station would expand beyond radio in the services it offers, including podcasts, concerts, and downloads. GCap set up a MySpace profile for theJazz to promote the station in the same way that it did for sister stations such as Planet Rock, Chill, and Core. On 1 August 2007 the website was relaunched as part of this expansion.

=== Record publishing ===
In April 2007, GCap announced that it had made a deal with Universal Classic and Jazz to allow theJazz to start its own record label. The label will publish jazz albums under theJazz name.

=== Other ===
Pure and TheJazz started a branded DAB digital radio receiver in 2007, sold exclusively in Marks & Spencer stores in the United Kingdom.

== Slogans ==
- "Come into the cool and feel good with The Jazz."

== See also ==
- 102.2 Jazz FM – An earlier UK jazz-only radio station which broadcast from 2002 until 2005 before being rebranded as 102.2 Smooth FM. It was owned by GMG Radio and had no connection with theJazz. However, many of the DJs and shows from Jazzfm could be heard on theJazz.
