= Smooth Radio =

Smooth Radio may refer to:

- Smooth Radio (2010), the original national network in the UK
- Smooth Radio (2014), the UK network in its current form
- Smooth FM, Australian radio network
