= Margherita Taylor =

English TV and radio presenter

Margherita Taylor MBE
- Born: Margherita Taylor; London, England
- Education: Birmingham City University
- Occupations: TV and radio presenter
- Years active: 1993–present
- Radio Stations: Classic FM and Smooth London
- Website: Archived site

Margherita Taylor is an English TV and radio presenter. She is a freelancer with Global Group and presents on stations Smooth Radio and Classic FM.

She studied media and communications at the University of Central England (now Birmingham City University), majoring in video production for her degree.

== Radio ==
Taylor started her career in broadcasting in 1993 when Birmingham based radio station BRMB offered her a slot as a DJ as part of a talent contest. She presented a weekend overnight show, but soon came to the attention of bosses at Capital London, BRMB's former sister station in London, and in 1994, was appointed presenter of weekend breakfast on the station, and provided cover for Capital's other presenters. She was the longest serving member of the on-air team.

Taylor presented an evening show on The Jazz; a radio station available on satellite, DAB and online. She could be heard on the Capital nine-station network presenting early weekend breakfast from 8 January until 31 December 2011. She then hosted Sunday afternoons from 1200–1600 and provided supply cover on Heart London and The Heart Network until March 2017. In March 2017 Taylor moved to Smooth London to present Sunday afternoons 2–6pm show. She now presents a show between 4pm and 7pm on Sundays across the Smooth Radio network.

Taylor presented Smooth Classics on Classic FM each weeknight until April 2023, when she became Classic FM's Drivetime presenter.

== Television ==
In March 1999, Taylor became one of the original presenters of the Channel 4 daytime teen-aimed show, T4, alongside Dermot O'Leary and later Vernon Kay. She left in January 2002.

She has acted as a contributor for Good Morning Britain, Lorraine, Countryfile, and This Morning on ITV, presenting competitions.

She began presenting Escape to the Country in 2016 until departing in 2022. She is presenter on BBC One's Countryfile.

Taylor has provided the voiceover for Woolworths adverts on television.

== Personal life ==
Taylor is of British, Trinidadian, Ghanaian and Danish heritage.

Taylor was appointed Member of the Order of the British Empire (MBE) in the 2022 New Year Honours for services to broadcasting and diversity.
