= Russ Williams (DJ) =

English radio DJ (born 1962)

- Born: Russell Williams; 21 January 1962 (age 64); Blackpool, England
- Occupation: Radio personality
- Years active: 1980s–present

Russell "Russ" Williams (born 21 January 1962) is an English radio DJ primarily known for his long-running shows on Virgin Radio (from 1993), and 2008 to 2016 on Absolute Radio, the re-launched version of Virgin Radio.

== Early life ==
Williams trained at London's National Broadcasting School in Programming and Journalism.

== Radio career ==
After his training, Williams landed a journalist job at Brighton's Southern Sound including presenting weekend Breakfast, which then led to a presenting job at Radio Mercury in Sussex, presenting a chart show every Sunday from 3–5pm. Williams then moved to Finland where he presented his own show on Helsinki's Radio 1.

Williams returned to the UK and joined Newcastle's Metro Radio. In 1990, he joined London's Capital Radio to present the Weekend Breakfast Show, which remained his domain for three years. He often stood in as holiday relief for Chris Tarrant, and he also hosted The Rebel Yell Rock Machine, which was syndicated across the nation's airwaves every week.

Williams worked at Virgin Radio since it went on air in 1993. His first role was the Breakfast show, initially on his own, then alongside Jonathan Coleman. In October 1997, due to Chris Evans' arrival at the station, the duo went on to present the Drivetime show and in early 1998, Williams took on the mid-morning show on his own, until he finished in May 2015. He also presented a show on Absolute Classic Rock but left both shows in May 2015. In February 2008, he joined TalkSport as host of Kick Off.

Williams announced that he was leaving his mid-morning show on Absolute Radio on 28 April 2015 but would still continue his Saturday afternoon show for Rock and Roll Football. His last appearance on Rock and Roll Football was in May 2016. He joined Global Radio to host breakfast on Smooth Radio in March 2016 and began presenting on LBC London News later that year with his Saturday afternoon football show, Scores. He left both suddenly in 2018.

He has hosted Saturday Scoreboard for Talksport after leaving Global.

On 14 January 2019, he and Jonathan Coleman were reunited and joined Fix Radio when they started hosting their new show called The Russ & Jono Fix Radio Experience.

In January 2020, Williams began hosting the weekday morning show 10–1pm on Nation Radio UK and Nation local stations.

From 2022, Williams also hosted other shows on Nation Radio UK's sister stations Nation Radio Scotland and Nation Radio Wales.

In March 2025, Williams was absent from his show with Neil Fox reporting that he had Laryngitis. Mark Collins (from Nation Radio South) filled in with his local show being networked to all Nation local stations. In April 2025, despite Williams reporting on this X account that Nation had offered him a two year extension, he was removed from all Nation's websites and Collins took over the networked 10-1pm slot. No formal announcement of his departure was made.

== TV work ==
In 1995 and 1996, Williams was host of the Sky Sports TV show, Soccer AM and also presented Sky's live Football League coverage when they first obtained the rights in the 1996/97 season. In 1998, he was the announcer on ITV's Saturday night show Don't Try This at Home!. Then in 2001, he was the event commentator on the Channel 5 sports show Under Pressure which lasted one series and ten episodes.

During ITV's broadcasting of Premier League football coverage from 2001 to 2004, Williams was part of the team, commentating on edited matches and goal highlights. He also presented ITV's snooker coverage (the Nations Cup and the Champions Cup) between 1999 and 2002.

== Books ==
Russ Williams is author or co-author of the following books:

"Football Babylon", Virgin Books (1996)

"The Russ and Jono's Breakfast Experience" (with Jonathan Coleman), Virgin Books (1997)

"Football Babylon 2", Virgin Books (1998)

"How to Walk Yourself Healthy and Happy: Why Walking Exercise Boosts Physical and Mental Health", M-Y Books Ltd. (2020)

"How to Walk Yourself Healthy and Happy: Discover the Physical and Mental Benefits of Regular Walking" (audiobook), Zenibo Publishing (2020)

== Personal life ==
Williams lives in Tewin, Hertfordshire.

He is an ardent walker and a supporter of Tottenham Hotspur Football Club.
