= 102.2 Smooth FM =

- London; England
- Broadcast area: Greater London (FM); Nationwide (Freeview 718); Sky 0128
- Frequency: 102.2 MHz

Programming
- Format: Adult Contemporary

Ownership
- Owner: GMG Radio

History
- First air date: 7 June 2005
- Last air date: 26 March 2007

102.2 Smooth FM was an Independent Local Radio station for Greater London. It replaced 102.2 Jazz FM on 7 June 2005 at 10 am, with the help of R&B singer Lemar and the then breakfast show host Jon Scragg. The first track played, keeping with the name of the newly launched radio station was Sade Adu's "Smooth Operator", and was owned by the radio division of the Guardian Media Group, GMG Radio. Following disappointing audience figures, the station was closed on 23 March 2007 and relaunched as 102.2 Smooth Radio the following Monday, following a successful format change request to Ofcom to play music oriented at listeners aged 50 and above.

102.2 Smooth FM was available on DAB across London, Central Scotland, the North East of England, South Wales and the Severn Estuary, Yorkshire and the West Midlands, as well as on Freeview channel 718.

== Origins ==
In 2005, the Guardian Media Group made the decision to drop the jazz name from the Jazz FM brand and relaunch the station as Smooth FM. The London version of Jazz FM closed on 27 May 2005 to prepare for the launch of Smooth FM on 7 June.

== On-Air ==
102.2 Smooth FM played middle of the road music, soul and R&B during the day and, as part of its licence requirements, focused on jazz music at night. Smooth FM also played specialist jazz and soul shows at weekends, details of which are listed below.

The station was launched on the premise of a 'clutter-free' listen, offering 40 minutes of non-stop music every hour without commercial interruptions, deliberately posed as a direct challenge to the 'might' of the BBC and a tactic aimed at increasing the total number of hours listeners stayed with the station. The 'Smooth 40' later became the '9-5 Smooth 40', with off-peak shows introducing more commercial breaks into their output, before the concept was dropped altogether in mid-2006.

Weekday programming featured an 'all-request' feature entitled 'Smooth on Demand' at 2 pm and 7 pm, Monday to Friday, where listeners were invited to 'demand' their favourite song by calling a local-rate phone number.

Smooth FM also ran a number of 'big money' promotions to entice listeners to trial the station - the 'Smooth £10K Tripleplay' ran for several weeks in late 2005, giving £10,000 to a listener for correctly identifying three consecutive songs in a particular order. Another large prize was awarded to Dawn Muggleton on 19 April 2006, however - who correctly identified the 'Smooth Secret Song' (Diana Ross' My Old Piano), winning £118,454 at the end of a contest that had run for several months, which was, at that time, the biggest cash prize awarded on UK radio since 1999.

The station also held exclusive live commentary rights for Chelsea FC soccer matches, both Premiership and Champions League, in London for the 2005/06 and 2006/07 seasons. Hosted by Howard Pearce, live commentary was provided by Gary Taphouse and Kerry Dixon.

The station's jingle package was produced by Bespoke and voiced by Mitch Johnson.

== Presenters ==
102.2 Smooth FM's presenters included:

- Mike Allen
- Dave Brown
- Campbell Burnap
- Jim Colvin
- Jenni Costello
- Kevin Greening
- Rosie Kendrick
- Dave Koz
- Ramsey Lewis
- Gavin McCoy
- Howard Pearce
- Russell Pockett
- David Prever
- Jon Scragg
- Mark Walker
- Sarah Ward
- Nigel Williams
- Paul Wisdom
- Gareth Trower

== Specialist Shows Broadcast on 102.2 Smooth FM ==
- Motown Sunday: Four hours of Motown classics, initially hosted by programme director Mark Walker and later by Dave Brown.
- Legends of Jazz with Ramsey Lewis: A show which featured classic jazz recordings from major and influential jazz artists.
- Mainstem with Campbell Burnap: A two-hour programme which included many forms of jazz from classic to Latin as well as a mix of jazz from the younger players of the day.
- Peter Young: Three hours of funk, soul and jazz music.
- Smooth Selection: A selection of mellow jazz through the evening, first presented by Sarah Ward, later by Mark Walker and finally by Dave Brown.
- Smooth Edge: Four hours of soul music on in the early hours of Saturday and Sunday morning.
- The Dave Koz Radio Show: The jazz saxophonist presented a two-hour syndicated radio show on Sunday nights featuring the latest tracks in the world of smooth jazz, alongside interviews with well-known smooth jazz artists.
- The Late Lounge with Rosie Kendrick: A two-hour show featuring chillout grooves and jazz.
- The Saturday Night Experience: Broadcast on Saturday evenings from 9 pm and presented by Mike Chadwick, the show specialised in music with a distinct cutting edge.

== Rebrand ==
On 20 October 2006, GMG Radio announced that it was requesting a change of format for Smooth FM from Ofcom, moving the station away from its daytime soul and R&B remit, instead offering easy listening music and speech for the over 50s and an improved local news service. Ofcom approved the changes on 8 December 2006, with the condition that GMG retained the 45 hours of jazz per week that constituted part of the former licence requirement.

Smooth FM trailed the forthcoming changes from the beginning of March 2007, promising 'more of London's smooth favourites mixed with the best songs from the past five decades'. The station closed at 6:02 pm on Friday 23 March 2007 with newsreader Sam Gudger uttering the final words - "that was Smooth FM" - followed by a weekend of preview music, before the station's replacement, 102.2 Smooth Radio, launched on Monday 26 March.

== See also ==
- Timeline of Smooth Radio
