= Smooth jazz =

Commercially oriented crossover jazz

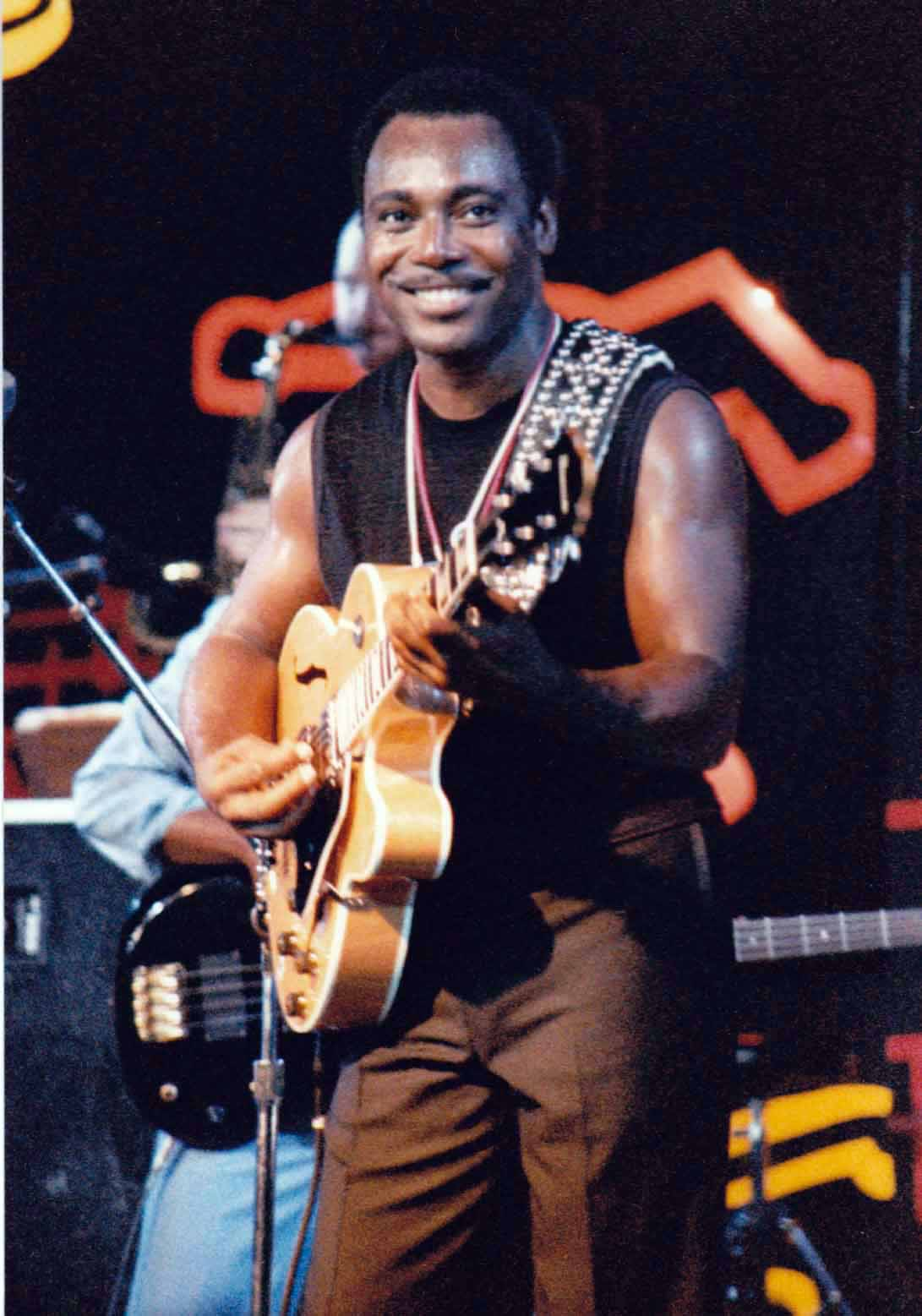
- George Benson in Montreux 1986
- Stylistic origins: Jazz fusion; Funk; Rock music; Pop; Rhythm and blues; Soul
- Cultural origins: 1970s, United States

Fusion genres
- Crossover jazz

Other topics
- List of musicians

Smooth jazz is a commercially oriented sub-genre style of jazz music that is influenced by R&B, funk, rock and pop music styles (separately, or in any combination).

Beginning in the early-1970s, jazz fusion (aka "fusion") was a movement by some jazz musicians to merge the instrumental virtuosity and improvisation of traditional jazz, with a modern, electronic sensibility. The instrument that has become the most widely-associated with the genre is the saxophone inspired by players like Grover Washington Jr., Ronnie Laws, Wayne Shorter and Nathan Davis; plus a gentle, legato electric guitar (influenced by players like Wes Montgomery and Grant Green). Jazz fusion ensembles such as Weather Report, Spyro Gyra, Hiroshima and Bob James' Fourplay were vital to the development of the genre.

Modern derivatives of the genre includes the more recent New Adult Contemporary format broadcast radio. "Smooth jazz" has been successful as a radio format, particularly in the 1980s and 1990s; however, its popularity has been on a decline since the 2000s, and most radio play today takes place on non-commercial radio stations.

== Description ==
In general, a smooth jazz track is downtempo (the most widely played tracks are in the 90–105 BPM range), layering a lead, melody-playing instrument (saxophones – especially soprano and tenor – are the most popular with guitars a close second) over a backdrop that typically consists of programmed rhythms and various pads and/or samples.

Smooth jazz groups or recording artists tend to play their instruments in a melodic fashion such that they are recognizable within just a few measures; this category includes names such as saxophonists Kenny G, Najee, David Sanborn, George Howard and Art Porter Jr.; guitarists George Benson, Earl Klugh, Marc Antoine, Peter White, Jonathan Butler, Norman Brown, Ronny Jordan, and Yves Vincent; keyboardist/pianists Joe Sample, David Benoit, and Bradley Joseph. Some performers, such as Dave Koz, Bob James, and Nathan East are notable for their numerous collaborations with many of the genre's big names. Groups include Fourplay, Pieces of a Dream, Acoustic Alchemy, Airbourne and the Rippingtons. Female performers includes Keiko Matsui, Joyce Cooling, Mindi Abair, Candy Dulfer, Sade, Brenda Russell, Pamela Williams, Regina Belle and Anita Baker.

== History ==
Smooth jazz may be thought of as commercially-oriented, crossover jazz which came to prominence in the 1980s, displacing the more venturesome jazz fusion from which it emerged. It avoids the improvisational "risk-taking" of jazz fusion, emphasizing melodic form, and much of the music was initially "a combination of jazz with easy-listening pop music and lightweight R&B."

During the mid-1970s in the United States, it was known as "smooth radio"; the genre was not termed "smooth jazz" until the 1980s.

The term itself seems to have been birthed directly out of radio marketing efforts. In an industry focus group in the late 1980s, one participant coined the phrase "smooth jazz" – and it stuck.

The popularity of smooth jazz as a radio format grew in the '80s and '90s, but gradually declined in the early 2000s. By 2009, many stations including in NYC, Washington, DC, and Boston had switched away from the format.

== Pioneers and notable songs ==
Smooth jazz was arguably pioneered in the early 1970s, with notable songs and artists including: "Grazing in the Grass" (1968), by trumpeter Hugh Masekela, "Nautilus" (1974) by keyboardist Bob James, and "Mister Magic" (1975) by saxophonist Grover Washington, Jr.

Other early popular releases include guitarist George Benson's 1976 cover/version of "Breezin'" and flugelhorn player Chuck Mangione's "Feels So Good" in 1977. Others are "What You Won't Do for Love" by Bobby Caldwell in 1978, jazz fusion group Spyro Gyra's 1979 instrumental song "Morning Dance" and the 1981 collaboration between Grover Washington Jr. and Bill Withers on "Just the Two of Us".

Smooth jazz grew in popularity in the 1980s and 1990s as Anita Baker, Sade, Al Jarreau, Grover Washington Jr. and Kenny G released multiple hit songs.

== Critical and public reception ==
The smooth jazz genre experienced a backlash exemplified by critical complaints about the "bland" sound of top-selling saxophonist Kenny G, whose popularity peaked with his 1992 album Breathless.

Music reviewer George Graham argues that the "so-called 'smooth jazz' sound of people like Kenny G has none of the fire and creativity that marked the best of the fusion scene during its heyday in the 1970s".

Digby Fairweather, before the start of UK jazz station theJazz, denounced the change to a smooth jazz format on defunct radio station 102.2 Jazz FM; he stated that the owners GMG Radio were responsible for the "attempted rape and (fortunately abortive) re-definition of the music — is one that no true jazz lover within the boundaries of the M25 will ever find it possible to forget or forgive."

== See also ==
- Rhythm and blues
- Lofi hip hop
- Neo-soul
- Mallsoft
- Quiet storm
- Sophisti-pop
- Yacht rock
- Smooth jazz radio
