= Kevin Greening =

British radio presenter (1962–2007)

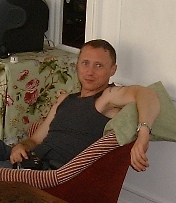
- Greening in 2002
- Born: Kevin Greening; 30 December 1962; Kent, England
- Died: 29 December 2007 (aged 44); Wandsworth, south London, England
- Resting place: Herongate Wood Cemetery, Brentwood, Essex.
- Education: St Catharine's College, Cambridge
- Occupation: Radio DJ
- Partner: Sean Griffin

Kevin Greening (30 December 1962 – 29 December 2007) was a British radio presenter, who co-hosted BBC Radio 1's Breakfast Show with Zoe Ball from 13 October 1997 to 25 September 1998.

== Early career ==
Kevin Greening grew up in Bristol where he worked voluntarily for the Bristol Hospital Broadcasting Service and was educated at Bristol Grammar School. He later studied chemical engineering at St Catharine's College, Cambridge, where he was station manager at Cambridge University Radio. His first job was as a construction worker on the Humber Bridge. He then trained as a studio manager and began his broadcasting career at the BBC World Service. After a brief spell as a Programme assistant at BBC Radio Solent, in 1989 Greening joined London's Local station BBC GLR as a producer, before becoming a presenter of their Breakfast show in 1991.

In April 1993, Greening joined the newly launched Virgin Radio, presenting a Friday and Saturday evening show and a Sunday morning show. After two months, he took over their weekday afternoon show, where he remained until he quit Virgin in December 1993.

== Radio 1 ==
In January 1994, Greening joined BBC Radio 1, presenting the Weekend Breakfast Show (Saturday and Sunday 7–10 am). In the summer of 1994, Radio 1 agreed to cover the Gay Pride event for the first time and these reports into the general days' output were fronted by Greening; the success of these led to Radio 1 becoming a regular fixture at Gay Pride events. In May 1995 Greening was named in Gay Times' Top 200 Gay Men and Lesbians as an out gay DJ.

In November 1994, Greening took over the Weekend Lunchtime show (Saturday and Sunday noon to 2 pm). Again he featured many of his comedy characters (usually voiced by Andrew McGibbon) featured on Weekend Breakfast. October 1995 saw Greening move back to Weekend Breakfast where he would remain for another 16 months. Greening was given the Drivetime show in February 1997. Regular features on the show included the "Joke du Jour", "60 Second Cinema", and the "Evening Procession".

Early mornings seemed to play a big role during Greening's time at Radio 1, as he had presented Weekend Breakfast and had also been the main stand-in presenter for Steve Wright, Chris Evans and Mark Radcliffe on the weekday breakfast show, but October 1997 saw Greening present The Radio 1 Breakfast Show alongside Zoe Ball, where he would remain for 12 months.

Greening moved to a Sunday morning show from 6:30 to 10 am in September 1998. At the time he was also presenting shows for BBC World Service and a TV show for digital station BBC Choice. It was during this period that Greening became the main stand-in presenter on the network, covering for many weekday presenters including Scott Mills, Simon Mayo and Mark Radcliffe. There was also a period when Greening took over the weekday lunchtime show whilst regular presenter Jo Whiley was away on maternity leave. He occasionally made light of his status as a stand-in presenter, giving an alternative Email address as supply.dj@bbc.co.uk (his main address being kevin.greening@bbc.co.uk)

On Sunday 16 January 2000, Greening presented his final Radio 1 show. In the last half-hour he played some of the sketches from his time with the station.

== Radio 5 Live ==
Not long after he left Radio 1, in 2000 Greening moved to BBC Radio 5 Live, where he was a stand-in presenter for various daytime slots.

In March 2001, whilst undertaking supply work at Five Live, he began co-presenting a Saturday Morning show on GLR's replacement, BBC London Live, alongside Amanda Hussain, the show went out from 8 to 11 am on Saturday mornings and lasted until September the same year when the show was taken over by Danny Baker.

== Commercial radio ==
From late 2001 into 2002, 102.2 Jazz FM employed him for various slots, then in May 2002, he briefly joined London's Heart 106.2 presenting their 2-6 pm weekend afternoon show.

In June 2002, he joined London's Rock station XFM, sitting in for Christian O'Connell on the Breakfast Show. One month later, he took over the station's mid-morning slot from 10 am to 1 pm, where he remained until December 2003.

In January 2004, he was moved to the Station's Best of X show on Saturday evenings from 6 to 9 pm.

After a stand-in stint on the BBC Radio 6 Music's Night Train programme, and in addition to his Saturday evening show on XFM in April 2004, he re-joined 102.2 Jazz FM to present a Sunday morning show from 10 am to 2 pm. Shortly after, he also took over from Clive Warren on Saturdays from 10 am to 2 pm.

On 7 June 2005, he took over the 10 am – 3 pm slot on 102.2 Jazz FM's replacement, 102.2 Smooth FM. From 26 March 2007, he moved to a 1–4 pm weekday afternoon slot on the relaunched 102.2 Smooth Radio where he built up a cult following. His "game with no name" quiz show, in which listeners had to suggest the most suitable song to play against a particular news item, was particularly popular.

He also presented Saturday afternoons from 2 to 5 pm on the station.

== Personal life ==
Greening was awarded a Fellowship by The Radio Academy in 2001. He was the only non-executive ever to be so honoured in the academy's 25 years.

Greening was openly gay and had a previous long-term relationship with Andy Lowe, whom he often referred to on air as his "lesbian life-partner" or "live-in chum". When their relationship came to an end in 2005, after a brief separation they continued to share their house in north London.

At the time of his death Greening had been in a relationship with Sean Griffin for some time.

== Death ==
On 30 December 2007, Chris North, Greening's agent, announced that Greening had "died peacefully in his sleep" one day before his 45th birthday. His boyfriend, Sean Griffin, was arrested the following day in connection with his death, and for possession of a Class A drug, but charges in relation to Greening's death were not pursued by police.

On 3 January 2008, it was revealed following the post-mortem that Greening died of a heart attack after taking large quantities of cocaine, ecstasy and GHB. He had spent part of the night prior to his death at the Recon event held at The Arches nightclub in Southwark, London.

Greening was buried on 18 January 2008 in a woodland burial ground after a secular humanist farewell ceremony in accordance with his wishes.

At the inquest into his death, a verdict of death by misadventure was recorded as a result of a self-induced drug overdose during a bondage session.

After his death an award was named after him at the Student Radio Association's annual Student Radio Awards. The Kevin Greening Award is dedicated to recognising unique on-air creativity, for which Greening was known.

Media offices
Preceded by Mark and Lard	BBC Radio 1 Breakfast Show Presenter (with Zoe Ball); 1997–1998	Succeeded by Zoe Ball
