= Emma B =

English radio presenter (born 1970)

- Born: Emma Louise Boughton; 27 November 1970 (age 55); Birmingham, England
- Presenting career
- Country: United Kingdom
- Previous shows: BBC Radio 1 (1998–2005); Heart 106.2; Smooth Radio; Magic Radio

Emma Louise Boughton (born 27 November 1970) is an English radio presenter who worked for BBC Radio 1.

== Early career ==
Boughton's childhood was spent in Canada before she moved to Birmingham, England as a teenager. She graduated from the University of Exeter with a BA in English and Drama, staying on as a sabbatical officer organising all the live events and skiing competitively for the university. She came seventh in the giant slalom in the British university championships.

Her first experience with radio was at the age of seven as part of a drama on BBC Radio Oxford with Timmy Mallett. She worked at Radio Caroline (at Bristol dock) before writing articles for media magazines, which included Kerrang!. She also presented a daily children's show along with Timmy Mallet at Radio Oxford, where she was called Susan Zinc.

== BBC ==
Boughton joined BBC Radio 1 in April 1998, presenting an early Saturday morning show from 4 am to 7 am. In 1999, she took over the Saturday afternoon show from 1 pm to 3 pm alongside Sara Cox and the Sunday night/Monday morning overnight slot from 1 am to 4 am. In addition to that, in January 2000, she co-presented the Sunday Surgery show, alongside Dr. Mark Hamilton every Sunday evening from 9 pm to 11 pm. Sunday Surgery dealt with social and health problems including sex, drugs, poverty and crime. She won four Sonys for the show and was singled out as having saved lives through the show.

In September 2001, Boughton took over Saturday Breakfast from 7 am to 10 am as well as the Sunday Surgery show. She continued with Saturday Breakfast until late 2003. From 2004 to 2005, she also presented on BBC Radio 6 Music, filling in for various presenters such as Liz Kershaw, Gideon Coe, Vic McGlynn and Jane Gazzo. She has also presented Top of the Pops for the BBC World Service.

== Heart 106.2 ==
Boughton eventually quit BBC Radio 1 in early 2005. In August 2005, she joined London's Heart 106.2, presenting a Sunday evening show from 7 pm to 10 pm. She then took over the weekday drivetime show alongside fellow DJ Greg Burns, and then moved to the 4 pm – 7 pm slot alone. Her show was the first female solo show to ever take the number one spot on the drivetime slot in the London area. During her time at Heart she also occasionally presented shows for its sister station LBC as well as the BBC's Five Live service. She left Heart at the end of July 2009 to move with her family to Ibiza.

== Other radio and work ==
Boughton was the voiceover for the safety video of former British charter airline Thomsonfly. She joined Magic Radio to cover Angie Greaves' afternoon show in November 2016. She hosted her own show on Saturday 10:00 to 1:00 before taking over from Greaves as host of the weekday afternoon slot (1:00 pm to 4:00 pm) on Magic in September 2019.

In February 2020, Boughton began hosting Macmillan Cancer Support's podcast, Talking Cancer.

On 6 June 2025, Emma B left Magic Radio for new ventures, with Jo Russell taking over her weekend slot on an interim basis until a permanent replacement was made.

In July 2025, Emma B announced she would be sitting in for Chris Evans for three weeks on his Virgin Radio breakfast show.

In January 2026, Emma B took over the morning 10:00 am to 1:00 pm slot at Virgin Radio.

== TV career ==
Boughton presented various youth programmes on television including The Base on ITV and Hype on BBC Choice. She also occasionally appears on GMTV. She narrated a few series of ITV's Club Reps, which was made by STV Productions.

== Personal life ==
Boughton married on 8 November 2003. She has two daughters who were both born in London; one daughter is an actor and the other is a contemporary dancer.
