= 102.2 Jazz FM =

102.2 Jazz FM (defunct)
- England
- Broadcast area: Greater London (FM), Nationwide (Freeview); Nationwide (Sky Digital); Greater London, Yorkshire, South Wales and the Severn Estuary, West Midlands, North East England, Central Scotland (DAB)
- Frequency: 102.2 MHz

Programming
- Format: Jazz

Ownership
- Owner: GMG Radio

History
- First air date: 4 March 1990
- Last air date: 23 March 2005

Links
- Website: www.jazzfm.com

102.2 Jazz FM (also known as London Jazz Radio and JFM) was an Independent Local Radio for London run by GMG Radio. The station was based in and broadcast from Castlereagh Street in London. The station experimented with its core playlist over its fifteen-year history, incorporating smooth jazz, mainstream jazz, soul, jazz fusion, acid jazz, blues and rhythm and blues. In 1994, the station changed its name to JFM to encourage more listeners who were put off by the 'Jazz' in the station's name. Richard Wheatly was appointed in 1995 to turn the station around when there was only three months' money left to run the station. He made a number of sweeping changes to the playlist, selling a sister station and changing the name back to Jazz FM, as well as starting up a record label and spin-off business deals and opportunities which helped Jazz FM swing into the black and make a profit in 2001.

In July 2002, after a relaxation in ownership rules from the publication of the Communications Bill, the Guardian Media Group's (GMG) radio division was able to purchase the station for £44.5 million. GMG made more changes to the playlist, shifting to more R&B, soul, easy listening and adult contemporary music during the daytime. In 2004 with the agreement of Ofcom, jazz was dropped from the daytime schedules, but a requirement of 45 hours per week of jazz was retained, this to be played during the night.

In June 2005, GMG Radio replaced the station with adult contemporary station 102.2 Smooth FM. GMG cited a number of reasons for replacing Jazz FM, including poor listening figures, not making money, the 'Jazz' name putting off potential listeners as well as not enough jazz for jazz purists. The Jazz FM name was retained by GMG for the relaunched ejazz.fm website service which was renamed jazzfm.com on the same day as the launch of Smooth FM. The station broadcast on digital satellite, online and on spare DAB capacity in Yorkshire, South Wales and the Severn Estuary where 102.2 Smooth FM and the defunct Smooth Digital service would have been duplicated.

On 28 February 2008, GMG Radio announced the potential return of Jazz FM in London on DAB radio, digital satellite and the Internet as a relaunch of the current jazzfm.com service. The station relaunched on 6 October 2008.

== History ==
The station was launched as a result of a ten-year campaign by musician Dave Lee and Jasper Grinling (CBE 1978; Chairman, London Jazz Radio plc, 1989–91) who was inspired after listening to a Los Angeles jazz radio station, which has turned into a classical station. In 1980, Lee wrote the following to the Independent Broadcasting Authority: "Dear Sir, I hereby apply for a licence to open a jazz radio station in London."

With competition from Kiss FM for one of the Londonwide incremental radio licenses, the IBA awarded the London Jazz Radio group the licence on 12 July 1989. Ron Onions, the former editor-in-chief of LBC, was appointed station director. As Jazz FM the station launched on 4 March 1990 with an Ella Fitzgerald concert at the Royal Festival Hall in London. Fitzgerald was flown in by the station to perform the concert, at which she sang with the Count Basie Orchestra; the concert was her last appearance in Europe. To promote the station, Jazz FM paid out £750,000 for advertising on ITV.

Jazz FM faced insolvency in its early life. Broadcast Investments made an offer of £348,000 to purchase the station. Broadcast Investments withdrew the offer when Golden Rose Communications made a higher offer of £500,000 for the station. Golden Rose Communications took over the station in 1991. Former finance director Alastair Mackenzie stated that in an interview in 2002 that the station had run out of money three times in 1991, and he also helped with a management buy-in of the station for £435,000 in 1992.

Jazz FM's licence was put up for renewal in 1993 by the Radio Authority. As well as Jazz FM, there was a bid for the licence from Euro Jazz London, which included ex-Jazz FM employees. Jazz FM retained its licence to broadcast.

In 1994, the name of the station was changed to JFM by the station's management in order to appeal to more listeners who may have been put off by the name "jazz" in Jazz FM, and who thought that Jazz FM only played jazz records. The station spent £500,000 on publicising the name change. Richard Wheatly was appointed chief executive officer in 1995 to revive JFM which was running out of money due to both JFM and sister radio station Viva AM, a radio station for women. When Wheatly joined JFM, the station had three months cash remaining in the bank. Golden Rose Communications was floated on the stock exchange in the early part of 1995. Wheatly sold Viva AM which was losing £100,000 a month before the sale for £3 million to Mohamed Al-Fayed as part of his cost-cutting plans. After 15 months of being branded as JFM, in the autumn of 1995 the name reverted to Jazz FM after Wheatly asked the Radio Authority for approval to change the name of the station back from JFM to Jazz FM. The change back to Jazz FM was reported to have cost £900,000.

Golden Rose Communications opened a jazz themed restaurant, Cafe Jazbar in Liverpool in April 1997. The restaurant was operated under a joint venture with Regent Inns. A travel service in partnership with Thomas Cook Group and British Airways was also set up. There were plans for jazz retail outlets named "Jazshops" to sell CDs and merchandise.

In December 1997, Golden Rose Communications planned to make a bid for Melody 105.4 FM which failed. The station was purchased by EMAP and rebranded Magic 105.4 FM.

Jazz FM Regional and ILR FM applications
Area	Year	Successful Applicant	Reference
North West	1993 (launched 1994)	100.4 Jazz FM (licensed as Jazz FM 100.4, launched as JFM 100.4)	
Central Scotland	1998	Beat FM	
North East England	1998	Galaxy North East	
South Wales	1999	Real Radio	
Yorkshire	2001	Real Radio	
West Midlands	2003	Kerrang! 105.2	
Glasgow	2003	Saga 105.2	

Beginning in 1998, Jazz FM wanted to expand its operation across the UK. The station made bids to run stations on FM frequencies in Central Scotland, the North East of England, South Wales, Yorkshire, the West Midlands, and Glasgow. Jazz FM withdrew from bidding for an FM licence in the East Midlands because chief executive Richard Wheatly believed that a dance station would secure the licence. The East Midlands FM licence was awarded to Saga 106.6 FM which started broadcasting in 2003. Jazz FM did become a member of the MXR consortium and did launch on DAB multiplexes operated by MXR as well as Switch Digital multiplexes in London and Central Scotland.

The station signed a deal with Clear Channel Communications in February 1999. The deal not only invested £3 million into the station but also allowed Jazz FM to advertise on unused advertising billboards.

On 12 December 1999, Golden Rose Communications changed its name to Jazz FM plc. In January 2002, Jazz FM plc made a £20 million bid for London talk radio station London News Radio. The bid was backed by the Guardian Media Group (GMG) and Clear Channel International. If the bid had succeeded, the station would have combined London News Radio's operations with its own to save money. The station was later sold to the Chrysalis Group for £23.5 million. In May 2002, GMG made a bid of £41 million to Jazz FM plc at 180p per share. The bid came on the day the draft Communication Bill was published.

Jazz FM plc's largest shareholder, Clear Channel, had been waiting for a 220p-per-share bid, but agreed to the 180p-per-share bid in late May. Herald Investment Management, which had a 7.7% stake in the company, and Aberforth Partners were unhappy with the 180p-per-share bid. On 6 June, GMG raised its bid to 195p per share to secure the institutional shareholders who were holding out for a better bid. Richard Wheatly announced that he would leave Jazz FM once the takeover was complete. The offer was declared wholly unconditional on 5 July. In December 2002, GMG moved its sales operation from Clear Channel Radio Sales to the Chrysalis Group, inline with the sales operation for other GMG Radio stations.

=== Jazz FM TV ===
Plans for a Jazz FM TV channel to start in the middle of 2004 were reported by websites from 2003. The channel would have been a mix of music videos and documentaries.

=== Making way for Smooth FM ===
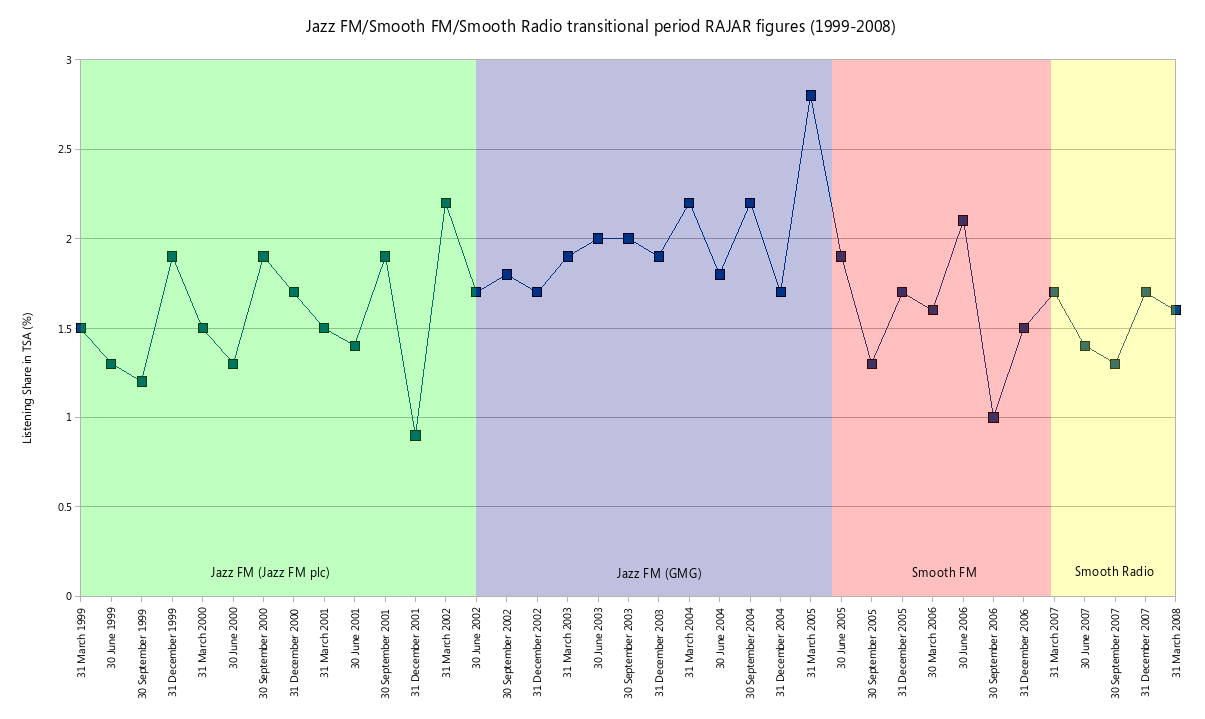
RAJAR figures for 102.2 Jazz FM/Smooth FM/Smooth Radio

In 2005, GMG dropped the name "jazz" name and rebranded Jazz FM Smooth FM. Chief Executive John Myers said, "As sorry as we are to say goodbye to Jazz FM, it's a sad fact of life that it has never made a profit in its 15 years of existence." However, in 2001 Jazz FM plc did make a profit before tax for the six months to December 2000 of £60,000, with most of the profit coming from Hed Kandi and other Jazz FM Records CD sales, a move of Jazz FM's sales team to Clear Channel's control, saving Jazz FM plc £1 million every year and increased revenues from advertising due to higher audience figures. Jazz FM also announced in 2001 that it had made full year profits before tax of £134,000 to 30 June 2001.

Other reasons given for rebranding included disappointing RAJAR figures, that the Jazz FM name discouraged people from listening, and that the station wasn't playing enough jazz for the purists. The latter situation was solved by GMG Radio when it invested in the ejazz.fm website and changed the name to jazzfm.com at the same time 102.2 Jazz FM became 102.2 Smooth FM. Included in the investment would be two dedicated jazz stations.

The North West version of Jazz FM was the first to rebrand on 1 March 2004, followed by the London version (including the Freeview and many of the DAB feeds) on 7 June 2005. During the last few weeks before the start of Smooth FM, Jazz FM changed its jingles slightly from "Smooth Jazz and Classic Soul" to "London's Smooth Favourites" as an indication to listeners of the change to come. Jazz FM in its previous form closed on Friday 27 May 2005. The last track it played was "Ev'ry Time We Say Goodbye" by Ella Fitzgerald.

=== Return to the airwaves ===
Hierarchy of Jazz FM from 1990 to present

The station continued to broadcast after the launch of Smooth FM under the Jazz FM name as jazzfm.com on the Internet and on Digital Audio Broadcasting in West Central Scotland at a higher bit rate.

On 28 February 2008 GMG Radio's chief executive John Myers announced that Jazz FM would return in London, the North West, and the West Midlands on DAB. Myers also said it would make more sense to have a dedicated radio station for jazz listeners than the 45 hours of jazz on Smooth FM, as required by the licence granted to them by Ofcom. The closing of theJazz on Digital One was one reason for the return of Jazz FM. The relaunch of jazzfm.com, under a three-year deal with The Local Radio Company, happened on 6 October 2008.

== Playlist ==
When Jazz FM launched, the station played a mixture of mainstream jazz, with the daytime schedules dedicated to smooth jazz and soul. Specialist programming from Jez Nelson and concerts were broadcast in the evening and at weekends. In 1992, the policy changed, and all non-jazz programming was taken off the schedules.

In 1994, alongside the change of name to JFM, the core playlist was changed under agreement with the Radio Authority to give a more mainstream sound of soul, jazz fusion, and blues music, with a requirement that only 25% of music played on the station had to be jazz.

In 1995, when the name changed back to Jazz FM, smooth jazz and fusion were reduced. More popular mainstream jazz was put in the playlist.

Chief Executive Officer Richard Wheatly noted the station format was in trouble because of its serious straight jazz playlist. To counteract this downturn in listeners to Jazz FM, beginning in 1998, Wheatly introduced varied jazz into the daytime playlists. Beginning in February 1998, smooth jazz and soul were more integrated into the core playlist of Jazz FM.

Although from the start Jazz FM played jazz, soul and softer R&B were added to appeal to the 25-45-year-old market. This was especially true after GMG Radio took over the running of the station and in November 2004 after an agreement with Ofcom, when jazz was dropped from the daytime playlists. John Simon, GMG programme director, said that the station was never licensed as a jazz station, but as a station that played a broad range of black music styles.

=== Music policy criticism ===
Why not pull out altogether and hand the wavelength to a company happy to play jazz? That, after all, is its broadcasting mandate.

— Jack Massarik, Evening Standard

Since the station began in 1990, fans of traditional and modern jazz criticised Jazz FM for playing more 'accessible' music, such as smooth jazz, British jazz and blues singer George Melly stated to The Independent in 2003 that he had become so disillusioned with Jazz FM's playlist he had stopped listening to the station, describing the music as "middle of the road". Grammy Award-winning jazz musician John Chilton stated that Jazz FM was failing to reach its remit for jazz and that he would prefer the station adopt a jazz-only policy.

In March 2003 the Radio Authority (embodied into Ofcom, the UK government's communications regulator) investigated Jazz FM after it received two complaints from listeners that the station was playing more pop music after changes to the playlist in January 2003. Musicians played on Jazz FM which were alleged to have infringed its licence included U2, Eric Clapton, and Van Morrison. Chris Hodgkins, director of Jazz Service, which is funded by the Arts Council in the UK, stated he would lodge a complaint with the Radio Authority because jazz musicians were being denied airplay due to daytime play of soul and smooth jazz.

Jazz FM was cleared by the Radio Authority of any breach in June 2003. By the end of the investigation, it was revealed that fifteen people had complained that Jazz FM was not playing enough jazz.

As part of its licence agreement with Jazz FM, Ofcom stated that Jazz FM had to dedicate at least 50% of the daytime output before 19:00 to jazz, and that the music "must sit well with the label jazz". However, from 15 November 2004, as part of an agreement with GMG, Ofcom agreed to allow GMG to change the format, with the 50% jazz in daytime requirement dropped. John Myers said, "The policy we are going on is ratings by day, reputation by night. Jazz is much more of a night-time listen so the changes fit well." As a result, jazz was increased from 40 to 45 hours and the Dinner Jazz programme hours were increased from two to three.

In a 2006 article for theJazz, musician Digby Fairweather said Jazz FM had turned into a "tragic and swift disaster story" and that the change of playlist was "responsible for both the attempted rape and (fortunately abortive) re-definition of the music" to which no-one within the Jazz FM coverage area would forgive.

== Jingles, slogans, and branding ==
British jazz singer Kay Garner was asked by Dave Lee, founder of Jazz FM, to sing jingles for the station when it began in 1990. Jazz FM has had other jingles and slogan. The most well known was the "Listen in Colour" (featuring the Jazz FM chameleon) strapline, poster advertising campaign and CD in January 1997. The campaign was created by the Willox Ambler Rodford Law advertising agency. The campaign was credited with a 48% increase in RAJAR listening figures from 437,000 to 650,000 in the last quarter of 1997. Later in 2002 a poster campaign by WARL was started with the chameleon peering through a misted window with the tagline "Come into the Cool". Other slogans include "The Rhythm of the City" and afterwards, during the GMG era, "Get It On" created by Kitcatt Nohr Alexander Shaw, though on-air it was swiftly replaced by "Smooth Jazz and Classic Soul". The £5 million relaunch with Manning Gottlieb over three years from 2003 brought an end to the Jazz FM chameleon because extensive research carried out by GMG Radio found that few people could associate and recall the chameleon with Jazz FM. The Bespoke Music Company created the Jazz FM jingles which were in use since 1 January 2003, until 102.2 Jazz FM was relaunched as 102.2 Smooth FM.

== Availability ==
As well as on FM in London, Jazz FM was made available on digital radio in the United Kingdom via the Sky Digital platform on 30 April 2002 and on the Freeview platform on 30 October 2002. Both were preceded by test transmissions. Jazz FM was available on DAB digital radio on MXR multiplexes in England, South Wales, and Central Scotland (excluding MXR North West, which hosted the defunct 100.4 Jazz FM service for the North West) and the Switch Digital multiplex covering Greater London. Jazz FM was broadcast around the world on the Internet through its website.

== Jazz FM events ==
Jazz FM Events specialised in setting up and providing events based on jazz and soul. This included concerts and performances in bars in the UK.

== Jazz FM connections ==
Jazz FM Connections was a dating site run by People2People.com. The service required an individual to pay a subscription to chat and meet people registered on the service. The service continued as Smooth FM Connections and later became Smooth Soulmates.

== Bring a Pound to Work Day ==
Jazz FM, like its counterpart GMG radio stations, held 'Bring a Pound to Work Day' in late October/early November 2003/2004. Listeners were asked to donate and collect pound coins for a local children's charity – Nordoff-Robbins in 2003 and the Lennox Children's Cancer Fund the following year. Listeners could also text message for donations at a cost of £1.50, of which £1 went to the charity. Jazz FM has held auctions to raise money for charity.

== Former specialist programmes ==
Many of the programmes that played on Jazz FM continued to be broadcast on 102.2 Smooth FM and were made available for download on the jazzfm.com website until 2008.

- Andy Peebles' Soul and Soccer: A three-hour show on Saturday afternoons featuring soul music alongside soccer updates and scores. The show continues on 100.4 Smooth FM but is now entirely playlisted and musically mirrors the station's normal music output.
- Behind the Mask: A six-part series which was commissioned in early 2003 following GMG's purchase of the station which saw vocalist Alison Moyet profiling well-known figures within the jazz industry.
- Behind the Mic: An occasional series which tended to air on Saturday lunchtimes between 1 pm and 2 pm – famous figures within the jazz/soul industry were invited to play their favourite songs.
- Dinner Jazz: One of Jazz FM's flagship shows on weekdays between 7 pm and 9 pm/10 pm featuring easy listening and jazz. The show made a return as part of Jazz FM's return in October 2008.
- Drivetime with Russell Pockett: A four-hour show playing jazz and soul music, included the Million Sellers at 3 pm, which only played songs that sold a million records or over and the Top 3 Most Requested at 5 pm, where a listener requests three pieces of music to be played in sequence on the show.
- Hed Kandi: Hed Kandi had two parts: between 2 am and 5 am, presenters Mark Doyle and Andy Norman played dance music for the "post-clubbing generation". Then, for one hour between 5 am and 6 am, the Hed Kandi Chillout Hour played more chilled out music.
- Legends of Jazz with Ramsey Lewis: A show which features classic jazz recordings from major and influential jazz artists.
- Mainstem with Campbell Burnap: A two-hour programme which included many forms of jazz from classic to Latin as well as a mix of jazz from the younger players of the day.
- Mike Chadwick's Cutting Edge: A two-hour show on Saturday nights featuring contemporary jazz music. The Cutting Edge was also produced for jazzfm.com, theJazz and part of the programming for the relaunch of jazzfm.com to Jazz FM in October 2008.
- Paul Gambaccini's Jazz 20: A jazz chart show which was originally broadcast on Saturdays but which moved to Sundays in 2004, and became the Jazz 40 between 5 pm and 8 pm.
- Peter Young's The Soul Cellar: A show on Sunday afternoons which featured soul music, including northern soul.
- Sidetrax: A half-hour show (1990–1991) from 10 pm on Saturday nights doubly presented by curators from the British Library Sound Archive in which a broad selection of jazz tracks was alternated with world and popular music according to a chosen theme. Introduced in a one-hour live special with Malcolm Laycock on the station's first day of transmission, the programme ran in its original form for over a year with Chris Clark and Lucy Duran as the main presenters. Sidetrax transferred to a slot within Somethin' Else in February 1991 and continued until May that year.
- Smooth Jazz Through the Night: A three-hour show through the night which played well known smooth jazz records from the archives of Jazz FM.
- Somethin' Else: A four-hour show on week nights featuring contemporary and classic jazz music, competitions and listener contributions. Presented and produced by Jez Nelson and Chris Phillips.
- The Late Lounge with Rosie Kendrick: A two-hour show featuring chillout grooves and jazz. In 2008, the show was brought back on the relaunched Jazz FM and presented by Claire Anderson.
- Tony Blackburn's Real Party Night: A show presented by Tony Blackburn featuring lively soul and disco music from the ages. Tony Blackburn also presented a show on Jazz FM called Real Soul between 10 pm and 12 am on weeknights from March 2003 for twelve months. Real Soul was replaced by a three-hour show from 1 March 2004 featuring jazz, soul and R&B music presented by Clive Warren.

== Notable former presenters ==
- Claire Anderson
- Tony Blackburn
- Campbell Burnap
- Mark Doyle
- Digby Fairweather
- Ruth Fisher
- Paul Gambaccini
- Jonny Gould
- Angie Greaves
- Kevin Greening
- Chris Hawkins
- Nicky Horne
- Paul Jones
- Dave Koz
- Malcolm Laycock (former programme controller)
- Ramsey Lewis
- Helen Mayhew
- Chris Philips
- Jez Nelson
- Charles Nove
- Bill Oddie
- Andy Peebles
- Gilles Peterson
- Chris Philips
- Russell Pockett
- Mike Shaft
- Tim Smith
- Clive Warren
- Jeff Young

== Jazz FM Records ==
Jazz FM employee Mark Doyle created and marketed many of the later Jazz FM compilations and created the Hed Kandi label, running and compiling the albums until his departure in 2005. From 2000 Hed Kandi began to market events appearing at nightclubs around the world. The most successful events were the residencies in Ibiza at El Divino and at Pacha in London. Hed Kandi also started the record labels Stereo Sushi & The Acid Lounge and had with Stonebridge. In November 2001, Ministry of Sound and Jazz FM plc made a deal whereby Ministry of Sound would distribute all Jazz FM records. Jazz FM Records was renamed Enterprise Records, which in turn was bought by the Ministry of Sound record label from GMG for an undisclosed sum in January 2006. However, under plans to relaunch jazzfm.com as Jazz FM, the Jazz FM Records label was brought back.

=== Jazz FM Records discography ===
- 101 Eastbound
- A Cellar Full of Soul
- Absolute Blues
- Brazilian Nights
- Breezin'
- Dinner Jazz American Classics
- Disco Jazz
- Dreamin'
- Driftin
- Guitar, Saxes and More
- Inspired
- Inspired 2
- Jazz FM – The Album
- Jazz of the Beat Generation
- Late Lounge Presents Boudoir Beats
- Mitchell & Dewbury – Beyond The Rains
- Nu Cool
- Nu Cool 2
- Ocean Drive
- Pacific Coast Highway
- Paul Hardcastle – 1983 – 2003, The Very Best of Paul Hardcastle
- Paul Hardcastle – Three
- Pure Smooth Jazz
- Soho Jazz Sounds
- Soul Inspired
- Spirit of the Street: The Very Best of Inner City Cool
- The Late Lounge
- The Late Lounge 2
- The Late Lounge Presents Angels
- The Perrier Jazz Award Winners
- The Soul of Smooth Jazz
- The Soul of Smooth Jazz – Volume 2
- The Very Best of Smooth Jazz
- The Very Best of Smooth Jazz – Volume 2
- The Very Best of Jazz FM
- The Very Best of Jazz FM – Volume 2
- Tom and Joyce
- Tony Blackburn – Soul Survivor
- Velvet – Smooth Moods
- Velvet – Smooth Moods 2
- Venice Beach

== See also ==
- Jazz FM (UK)
- 100.4 Jazz FM
- 102.2 Smooth FM
