= Stake Out (game show) =

British television series

- Genre: Game show
- Created by: The Chatterbox Partnership
- Presented by: Anthony Davis
- Country of origin: United Kingdom
- Original language: English
- No. of series: 1
- No. of episodes: 30

Production
- Running time: 30 minutes (inc. commercials)
- Production company: Flextech

Original release
- Network: Challenge
- Release: 12 November – 21 December 2001

Stake Out is a British game show which originally aired on Challenge between 12 November and 21 December 2001. It was hosted by Anthony Davis in which contestants each bring £250 in cash, competing against each other in the hope of raising it up to £25,000.

== Gameplay ==
In each game, four contestants each brought £250 of "their own money" as an initial stake, which was immediately doubled to £500. In reality, all the money was supplied by the production company; no personal funds were ever at risk. The game was played in four rounds.

=== Round 1: All In ===
Four multiple-choice questions were asked, each with three answer options. Before every question, £75 was deducted from each contestant's total to form a pot of £300. Contestants secretly locked in their response on keypads, and the pot was evenly divided among all those who gave the correct answer.

=== Round 2: Cashing In ===
Each contestant was asked one question, but had to decide how much of their total to wager before hearing the three answer options. A correct answer added the wager to their total, while a miss deducted it.

=== Round 3: Face Off ===
Each contestant in turn chose an opponent to challenge, a category from a list of five, and a wager (up to either their own total or their opponent's, whichever was lower). The host then asked a toss-up question on the buzzer. If a contestant buzzed-in with the correct answer, the wager was added to their score and deducted from their opponent's. A miss gave the opponent a chance to hear the entire question again before buzzing-in. Once a contestant's total was reduced to zero, they were out of the game. A new list of five categories was presented after each complete pass through the field. Once two contestants remained, the game will move to the final round.

=== Final Round: All or Nothing ===
The last two players will play in a buzzer head to head, general knowledge questions. The stake start at £100 and increase rapidly and if one player can't match the stake it will match that number to the player that can't match the stake. If a player answered correctly they get the stake, if they get it wrong the other player can buzz in. If both of them answered the wrong answer, no money is lost. The round ends when one player bankrupted the other player.

The last remaining contestant became the champion and could either leave the show with their entire total, or risk £250 of it to defend their title in the next game. The contestant can play up to five games in succession.
