= Andy Peebles =

English DJ and television presenter (1948–2025)

- Born: Robert Andrew Peebles; 13 December 1948; Hampstead, London, England
- Died: 22 March 2025 (aged 76); Blackburn, Lancashire, England
- Education: Bishop's Stortford College
- Occupations: Radio DJ; Television presenter Cricket commentator
- Years active: 1969–2025

Robert Andrew Peebles (13 December 1948 – 22 March 2025) was an English radio DJ, television presenter and cricket commentator.

== Life and career ==
Born in Hampstead, London, Peebles attended Bishop's Stortford College. He began as a nightclub DJ in the late 1960s.

Peebles was resident DJ at the Chelsea Village disco in Glen Fern Road, Bournemouth, in the early 1970s.

He began his radio career in 1973 with BBC Radio Manchester. In 1974, Peebles was among the founding DJs of Piccadilly Radio in Manchester. After four years at Piccadilly, Peebles was a presenter on BBC Radio 1 from 1978 to 1992. During his time with the BBC, he also presented 15 editions of Top of the Pops from 1979 to 1984 and broadcast for the British Forces Broadcasting Service and the BBC World Service.

John Lennon recorded his final interview with a UK media outlet on 6 December 1980, with Peebles for Radio 1, two days before Lennon was murdered. That interview was the subject of the 2020 documentary Lennon's Last Weekend, directed by Brian Grant.

He presented Andy Peebles Soul Train on Smooth Radio which later moved to Gold which ended in 2014.

On 22 March 2025, Peebles died at the age of 76 at his home in Blackburn. He was married to Anne and had a stepdaughter, Sarah.
