= Angie Greaves =

British radio presenter

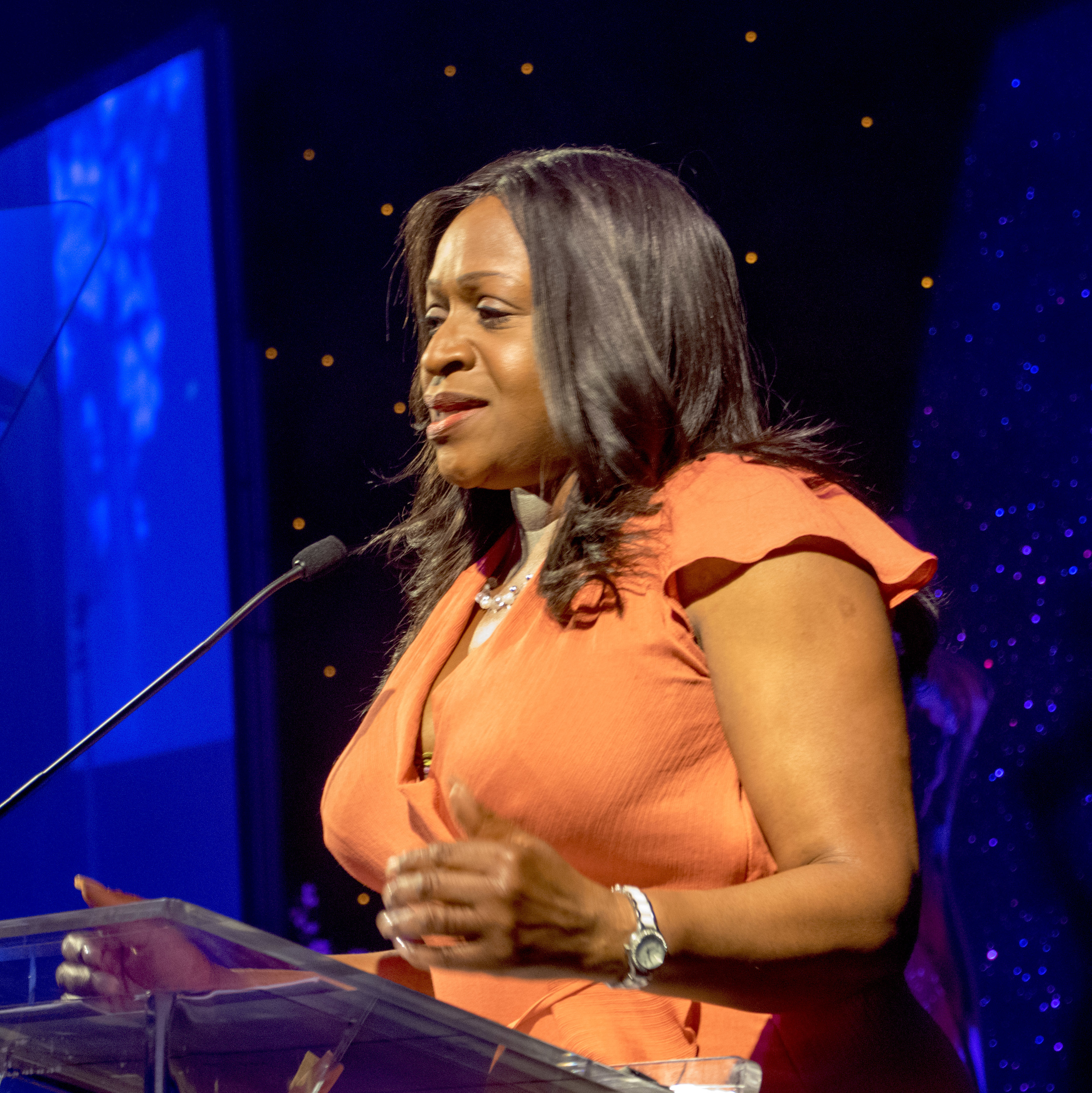
Angie Greaves at the Trade and Industry Gala Awards & Dinner in 2018

Angie Greaves (born in London) is a British radio presenter.

== Radio career ==
Greaves started her media career in 1982 as a BBC Administrator at Television Centre. In 1986 she moved to London's Capital Radio, where she began working on the radio after being “discovered” by DJ David “Kid” Jensen. She was the first female presenter to join the station and was the only female drivetime DJ on London radio.

Greaves went on to produce and present many long running, popular radio shows. She was the first DJ on Spectrum Radio at its launch on 25 June 1990. Between 1992 and 1997, Greaves presented the “Angie Greaves Breakfast Show” on Choice FM, London's first urban radio station. It became the most listened to show in the station's schedule and saw listening figures treble.

In 1997, Greaves joined the BBC, presenting “Angie’s Sunday Magazine Show” on BBC London Live and the weekly “Angie Greaves Music Show” for BBC Three Counties Radio. During the 2002 Commonwealth Games in Manchester, Greaves moved to the city for six months to present the weekday Drive Time show on BBC Commonwealth Games Radio.

Greaves hosted the mid-morning show in the run-up to London's 102.2 Jazz FM's closure in mid-2005 following the departure of previous host Nicky Horne, presented the lunchtime show on Radio Jackie and the afternoon slot on LBC 97.3FM until 2 January 2006.

From 2006 Greaves presented on Magic 105.4, which featured music, competitions and Angie's Book Club. She also presented on Magic's sister station Magic Soul, presenting the station's breakfast show.

She has filled in on BBC Radio 2's Good Morning Sunday; for example, she filled in February 2017.

In 2011, she was featured in the launch video for Sound Women, the network committed to celebrating the achievements and raising the profile of the women who work in the radio and audio industry. In an interview with The Observer about women in radio she commented, 'It's always baffled me why the majority of listeners to radio are women but they're a minority of presenters.'

In May 2019, Global announced that Greaves will be the host of a new national Drive Time show on the Smooth Radio network. This marked the end of 13 years of presenting on Magic Radio. Her final show for Magic was on 28 June 2019. Her first show on Smooth Radio was on 2 September 2019.

== Voiceover work ==
Greaves has recorded voiceovers for the MOBO Awards and documentaries on Channel 4, BBC1, BBC2, Sky TV and The Biography Channel. She has also recorded commercials for Sunny Delight and Snack-a-Jacks.

In 2002, she worked with The Jim Henson Company on the BAFTA-nominated series Construction Site to voice the character Maxine The Concrete Mixer.
