= Timeline of Global Radio =

A timeline of notable events relating to Global Radio, a British media company founded in 2007.

== 2000s ==
- 2007
  - Global is founded by Ashley Tabor-King, with financial backing from his father Michael Tabor.
  - 25 June – Global purchases Chrysalis Radio for £170 million, thereby acquiring the radio brands Heart, Galaxy, LBC and The Arrow.
- 2008
  - 31 March – Global agrees to purchase rival GCap Media for £375 million.
  - 31 October – Global Radio officially takes control of all GCap Media and its brands, giving it ownership of The One Network. The GCap Media name is dropped at this time.
- 2009
  - 5 January – Chiltern Radio, Hereward FM, Radio Broadland, Q103, Northants 96, SGR Colchester, SGR Ipswich, and Horizon Radio are all rebranded as Heart after earlier being acquired by Global Radio.
  - 7 April – Global sells its stake in the Digital One multiplex to transmission company Arqiva.
  - May – Orion Media purchases Midlands stations BRMB, Mercia, Wyvern, Beacon and Heart 106 from Global Radio for a sale price worth £37.5 million.

== 2010s ==
- 2010
  - 21 June – Global Radio announces plans to reduce the number of its local Heart stations from 33 to 15 so-called "super stations" in a reorganisation that will lead to the loss of up to 200 full-time and freelance posts. The stations will have their own breakfast and drivetime shows, and local news bulletins, but all other output will come from London. A further two stations owned by Global will also be subsumed into the Heart network.
  - 13 September – Global announce plans to scrap the Galaxy Network in order to create a nationwide Capital FM. The plans will also include the closure of four further stations, with the new network going live in early 2011.
- 2011
  - 3 January – Capital FM launches as a nine-strong quasi-national network of stations. It subsumes Capital London, The Hit Music Network and the Galaxy network.
- 2012
  - 25 June – GMG Radio is sold to Global Radio for a yet-to-be-disclosed amount, thought to be around £50m. However, some structural changes will be made to either organisations until the deal has been investigated by Ofcom. Several rival radio groups express their concerns over the takeover and the effect it could have on commercial radio in the UK.
  - 3 July – Global Radio announce plans to branch into television with the launch of two non-stop music channels; Heart TV and Capital TV, which will go on air from September.
  - 3 August – Culture Secretary Jeremy Hunt instructs Ofcom and the Office of Fair Trading to examine Global Radio's £70m purchase of GMG Radio.
  - 11 October – The Office of Fair Trading agrees to fast-track the investigation into Global Radio's purchase of GMG Radio after Secretary of State for Culture, Media and Sport Maria Miller says the deal will not be investigated for media plurality. The matter is also forwarded onto the Competition Commission, which oversees business mergers and takeovers. The Competition Commission later announces 27 March 2013 as the date on which it will publish its findings into the takeover.
  - 12 October – Global launches two television channels – Heart TV and Capital TV.
- 2013
  - 14 February – The Competition Commission publish their preliminary findings into the Global Radio takeover of GMG Radio, recommending a full or partial sale of the now renamed Real and Smooth Radio Ltd.
  - 21 May – The Competition Commission publishes its final report into Global's acquisition of GMG Radio, requiring Global to sell radio stations in seven locations. (Note: The stations involved were: Smooth or Capital (East Midlands); Real or Capital (South Wales); Real or Heart (North Wales); Capital or Real XS with either Real or Smooth (North West); Real or Smooth or Capital (North East); Real or Capital (Yorkshire); and Real or Capital (Scotland))
  - 1 October – Smooth Radio is moved to Global Radio's Leicester Square headquarters in London and given a makeover.
  - 3 October – Global Radio announces that Smooth 70s will close less than a week after Smooth programming moved to its London headquarters.
  - 7 October – Choice FM is rebranded as Capital Xtra and launches nationally on DAB radio.
  - 31 December – A financial report released by Global Radio shows the company paid £69m for the purchase of GMG Radio.
- 2014
  - 20 January – Global Radio is found to be in breach of their license remit for Heart Cornwall after a listener complained to Ofcom that there was not enough local news and speech to make it a fully local station.
  - 6 February – Global Radio sells eight of its regional stations to Irish media holdings firm Communicorp.
  - 11 February – LBC 97.3 launches nationally on the Digital One platform, taking over the slot formerly occupied by Jazz FM. The station also secures a sponsorship deal with the Financial Times.
  - 14 March – Global Radio announces that Gold will become a non-stop music service, with the exception of the breakfast show and Saturday's Vinyl Heaven. Presenters Paul Coyte, Eamonn Kelly, Dean Martin and Andy Peebles are also dropped from the network.
  - 24 March –
    - Smooth Radio returns to airing local output on its regional frequencies, with local programming for Breakfast and Drivetime, and a raft of new presenters joining the network.
    - Smooth Radio replaces Gold on MW across southern England.
  - 6 May – Heart North Wales launches. Consequently, the two local Heart north Wales stations become part of the Capital network.
  - September – Global launches its Make Some Noise charity.
  - 9 October – Global's first Make Some Noise Day raises over £1million for good causes.
  - 27 December – Global launches Smooth Extra on DAB.
- 2015
  - 7 September – Global announces that XFM will be relaunched as a national station called Radio X on 21 September.
  - 13 September – Ahead of the relaunch of XFM as Radio X, Global hands back the Paisley licence, on which it had broadcast XFM Scotland, to Ofcom when the regulator refused Global's request to network 24/7 from London.
  - 21 September – Radio X relaunches, and Chris Moyles joins the station to present the relaunched station's breakfast show with a return of the zoo format, and Vernon Kay also joins.
- 2016
  - 18 January – Following Global Radio's purchase of Liverpool station Juice 107.6 for £10m the station is relaunched as Capital Liverpool.
  - 23 February – Launch of Heart Extra.
  - March – Manchester station Real Radio XS is rebranded as XS Manchester.
  - 12 September – Launch of the Global Academy, a University technical college based in London.
- 2017
  - 20 January – The Global Academy is officially opened by the Duke of Cambridge and Prince Harry.
  - 14 March – Launch of Heart 80s.
  - 20 November – Global announces that it has purchased Cumbrian stations The Bay and Lakeland Radio from CN Group.
  - 20 December – Global Radio announce details of the voting categories for its inaugural awards ceremony, the Global Awards to be held at London's Hammersmith Eventim Apollo on 1 March 2018. The Awards will be reflective of the music, programmes and news aired on its network of stations.
- 2018
  - January – Global Radio announces that it has brought Brighton station Juice 107.2 for an undisclosed sum and in August it revealed that it would relaunch the station as Capital Brighton on Monday 3 September.
  - 1 March – Global Radio holds its inaugural awards ceremony, the Global Awards at London's Hammersmith Apollo.
  - 5 March – Cumbrian stations The Bay and Lakeland Radio are relaunched as Heart North Lancashire & Cumbria and Smooth Lake District respectfully following Global's purchase of the two stations from CN Group.
  - 31 July – Global announces that it has purchased Lancashire station 2BR from UKRD.
  - 11 October – After six years on air, Global closes its two music television channels Heart TV and Capital TV.
- 2019
  - 26 February – Following further deregulation allowing less locality, Global Radio announces plans to replace the regional breakfast shows on Capital, Heart and Smooth with a single national breakfast show for each network. Global also announces that it will take full advantage of the deregulation regarding the one non-national programme – a single three hour weekday programme – which allows local programmes to be replaced with regional programmes networked across all the stations in that region.
  - 1 March – Launch of Smooth Country.
  - 8 April – Capital London's breakfast show launches as a national programme, resulting in the scrapping of all other local breakfast shows apart from on Capital Cymru. The only 'local' programme is at drivetime and the new regulations mean that Global is able to replace local shows with 10 regional programmes which are networked across all stations in that region.
  - 3 June – Global launches a national 'Heart UK' breakfast show (broadcast from London), presented by Jamie Theakston and Amanda Holden. As with Capital, the only non networked programme is at drivetime with 23 local shows replaced by 10 regional programmes which are networked across all stations in that region.
  - 10 June – Gold UK starts broadcasting nationally when it launches on Digital One.
  - 21 June – Global launches another Heart spin-off station, Heart Dance.
  - 28 August-3 September – Global launches five more stations on DAB – Heart 90s (28 Aug), Heart 70s (30 Aug), Capital XTRA Reloaded (2 September), Smooth Country and Smooth Chill.
  - 1 September – Global closes rock station Arrow. It had been on air since 2001.
  - 2 September –
    - Global closes Chill after nearly 15 years on air. It is replaced the following day by Smooth Chill.
    - Smooth's networked Drivetime show, presented by Angie Greaves, launches. At the same time, the number of breakfast shows drops to seven.
  - 28 October – Global relaunches LBC London News as a national 24-hour rolling news channel titled LBC News.
  - 14 November – Ofcom gives its approval to change the format of six Quidem-owned stations – Banbury Sound, Rugby FM and the four Touch FM stations – to rhythmic-based, music-led services for listeners aged 15–29. The decision comes after Quidem entered into a deal with Global Radio to rebrand Quidem stations with one of Global's networks.

== 2020s ==
- 2020
  - 1 October – Global launches Capital Dance.
  - 3 October – Global Radio launches its first multimedia television advertising campaign, with the minute-long commercial first airing during an edition of Britain's Got Talent on ITV.
- 2021
  - 2 March – Global Radio is given Ofcom approval to drop the Heart Nightly News programme from a number of stations in the network previously owned by GMG Radio. As Real Radio the stations were required to provide extended news content, but Global has successfully argued listeners do not want to hear the programme. Heart also no longer has to commit to 24-hour news. The stations concerned are Heart Scotland, Heart Wales, Heart North Wales, Heart North West, Heart North East, Heart Yorkshire and Heart Cornwall; all were previously operated under the Real Radio name apart from Heart Cornwall.
  - 9 August – Global Radio confirms that it has purchased Quidem Media, allowing it to take full control of six Midlands stations that are running under the Capital brand.
- 2022
  - 13 June – Global Radio buys a share in Odeeo, a tech start-up that delivers audio ads in mobile games.
- 2023
  - 25 January – Smooth Radio undergoes a "brand refresh", with a new logo and strapline. "Your relaxing music mix" is replaced by "Always the best music".
  - 13 February – Capital Chill launches on the Sound Digital multiplex, and becomes the fifth Capital-branded station.
  - 16 February – Radio X Classic Rock is launched on the Sound Digital multiplex.
  - 18 May – Global Radio signs a deal with ITV to show highlights of the Capital Summertime Ball and Capital Jingle Bell Ball.
  - 30 June – Global Radio switches off more of its AM frequencies. The switch-offs leave Gold network as a digital only service apart from in London and Manchester. and Smooth Radio's AM frequencies in Dorset, Essex, Gloucestershire, Norfolk, Suffolk, Wiltshire and Plymouth are switched off.
  - 10 August – The Radio Today website reports that Global have relaunched the Galaxy brand on their Global Player app with a playlist titled "Galaxy of Stars".
  - 29 September – Global switches off of its 1548 kHz London frequency used by Gold.
- 2024
  - 8 January – Smooth Relax launches. The station occupies the space on Digital One which had become available following the conversion of Classic FM to DAB+ the prior week. Smooth Relax reuses the format and slogan of "Your relaxing music mix", previously used by the main Smooth Radio network.
  - April – Global nearly completes its withdrawal from broadcasting on AM when it switches off its last remaining MW transmitter for Gold in Greater Manchester.
  - 12 September – Global launches 12 new radio stations, all sister stations to its existing networks, with the new stations appearing on DAB and online. They include Capital Anthems and Smooth 80s, which air nationally on DAB, with the rest broadcasting on digital multiplexes in London. The stations also include a relaunch of Smooth 70s and the first sister stations for Classic FM.
  - 31 October – Global removes LBC News from its London 1152 kHz medium wave frequency, but the station continues on DAB+, Smart speaker, and online.
- 2025
  - 21 February – Heart, Smooth and Capital stations in England end all local and regional programming.
  - 28 February – At 1:00PM, Global completes its withdrawal from broadcasting on AM when it switches off its last remaining MW transmitter, in North Wales and Cheshire which had carried Smooth Radio North Wales and Cheshire.
  - 21 July – Global have acquired their first non-UK radio station after buying Monaco-based English language station Riviera Radio.
  - 11 December – Global unveils the winners of its inaugural Global Player Awards, recognising the artists and podcasters most listened to across its radio network and on Global Player.
- 2026
  - 23 September – Global Radio announces plans for the launch of Radio Plus, a premium service that will allow listeners to hear ad free versions of their radio stations.

== See also ==
- Timeline of Bauer Radio
