= 2019 in British radio =

This is a list of events taking place in 2019 relating to radio in the United Kingdom.

== Events ==
=== January ===
- 4 January – After presenting more than 10,000 programmes in his 42-year career, BBC Radio WM breakfast presenter Alex Lester announces he is stepping down from the role with immediate effect.
- 6 January – The first edition of The Official Big Top 40 is aired. The programme is broadcast every Sunday from 4-7pm on Global's Capital and Heart networks and is presented by Will Manning.
- 7 January –
  - Greatest Hits Radio replaces the Bauer City 2 branding. Individual station identities in Northern England are dropped and are rebranded to GHR with Scotland unaffected. The new network extends to the West Midlands, replacing Absolute Radio on FM in the region.
  - Absolute Classic Rock starts broadcasting on MW for the first time, when it replaces Free Radio 80s in Birmingham, Wolverhampton and Shropshire.
  - Jimmy Hill begins hosting The Capital Evening Show with Jimmy Hill, which broadcasts from 7pm across the Capital network.
- 14 January –
  - Zoë Ball takes over as presenter of The Radio 2 Breakfast Show.
  - Sara Cox replaces Simon Mayo as presenter of the drivetime show on Radio 2. The show is part of a major shake-up of the station's schedule, which sees it return to its two-hour format from 5.00pm to 7.00pm. Jo Whiley follows Sara with the return of her evening show, the specialist music programmes move to 9pm and Trevor Nelson replaces Sara Cox as presenter of the Monday to Thursday late show.
  - Samantha Meah and Daz Hale succeed Alex Lester as presenters of BBC Radio WM's breakfast show .
- 21 January –
  - Chris Evans joins Virgin Radio to present the breakfast show, and in a first for a commercial radio breakfast show, the show does not carry adverts as the programme is being paid for by sponsorship.
  - Former Radio 2 presenter Simon Mayo joins the lineup of Scala Radio, a new classical music station from Bauer Radio which will launch on 4 March.
  - On what would have been presenter Rachel Bland's 41st birthday, BBC Radio 5 Live launches the Rachel Bland New Podcasting Award, designed to encourage new broadcasting talent.
- 25 January – Radio 2 confirms that Johnnie Walker will step down from his presenting role for a short while to receive treatment for a heart condition.
- Undated in January – Talksport 2 is re-positioned as a rolling sports news and live sport station.

=== February ===
- 5 February – Bauer Media purchases Lincs FM Group and the stations owned by Celador Radio. However, three of the purchased stations are in areas in which Bauer currently operates stations. Therefore, Bauer immediately sells these stations. Consequently, the two purchases gives Bauer ownership of 33 more analogue and three more digital-only stations.
- 6 February – John Humphrys announces his intention to step down from his presenting role on BBC Radio 4's The Today Programme later in the year.
- 8 February – The Wireless Group sells its network of local radio stations in England and Wales to Bauer Media.
- 9 February – BBC Radio Solent airs the documentary When George Met Michael in which excerpts of a 1979 Radio 1 appearance by Michael Jackson is heard. Jackson is heard reviewing record releases with and George Harrison in the recording, and was thought to have been lost until its discovery and restoration.
- 26 February – Following OFCOM's decision to relax local content obligations from commercial radio, Global Radio announces plans to replace the regional breakfast shows on Capital, Heart and Smooth with a single national breakfast show for each network. Capital's new breakfast show will launch in April, with the others following later in the year. The number of regional drivetime shows will also be reduced.

=== March ===
- 4 March –
  - Scala Radio is launched, with Simon Mayo making his debut as one of the new station's presenters.
  - Jonathan Dimbleby announces he is stepping down as chair of Radio 4's Any Questions? He will present his final edition of the programme at the end of June.
- 5 March – Bauer purchases the ten FM stations owned by UKRD. The deal also includes the purchase of three local DAB multiplexes and UKRD's interest in First Radio Sales.
- 6–7 March – Radio 1's "LOLathon" with Scott Mills and Chris Stark took place as part of Red Nose Day 2019. The event raises £250,000 for Comic Relief.
- 11–12 March – Radio 2's Longest Ever Danceathon takes place as part of Red Nose Day.

=== April ===
- 4 April – Rhod Gilbert announces he is leaving his weekend show on BBC Radio Wales with immediate effect.
- 8 April –
  - Deregulation allows Global to launch Capital London's breakfast show as a national programme, resulting in the scrapping of all other local breakfast shows apart from on Capital Cymru. The only 'local' output is at drivetime and the new regulations mean that Global is able to replace local shows with 10 regional programmes which will be networked across all stations in that region.
  - Following Global's purchase of 2BR, Capital launches across north Lancashire.

=== May ===
- 2 May – The BBC removes the rap music track "Chaabian Boyz" by Frenzo Harami from playlists of Radio 1 and BBC Asian Network after it has been accused of glamourising sexual exploitation. The song, which has received limited play on the stations, will not be played again because it "did not meet [the BBC's] editorial standards".
- 9 May – Danny Baker is dismissed from his presenting role at BBC Radio 5 Live after he appeared to mock the racial heritage of the Duchess of Sussex by sharing on social media an image of a couple holding hands with a chimpanzee dressed in clothes with the caption: "Royal Baby leaves hospital". The BBC describes the incident as a "serious error of judgement" making The Danny Baker Show come to an end.
- 13 May – Major changes take place to the weekday output of BBC Radio Wales. Good Morning Wales and Good Evening Wales are replaced with brand new programmes and the daytime line-up is also modified.
- 31 May –
  - BBC Radio 5 Live launches a new Friday afternoon entertainment show presented by Elis James and John Robins. Consequently, the Friday edition of 5 Live Drive is reduced in length, starting an hour later, at 5pm.
  - BOB fm (Hertfordshire) closes as a stand-alone station and is subsumed into Heart Hertfordshire. This follows the purchase of the station by media group Communicorp.
  - Radio Ceredigion ceases broadcasting after its owners, Nation Broadcasting, decided to close the station and replace it with a relay of Nation Radio Wales.
  - Ed James presents his final breakfast show for Heart West Midlands after 17 years, and as Global Radio prepares to introduce a national breakfast programme from London.

=== June ===
- 3 June – Global launches a national 'Heart UK' breakfast show (broadcast from London), presented by Jamie Theakston and Amanda Holden. The only 'local' output is at drivetime and the new regulations mean that Global is able to replace 23 local shows with 10 regional programmes which will be networked across all stations in that region.
- 11 June – Jo Brand appears as a guest on Radio 4's Heresy during which she makes a remark about throwing battery acid at "unpleasant characters", prompting the BBC to defend the comment as "deliberately provocative as the title implies". However, the joke is subsequently removed from the programme when it appears on iPlayer.
- 13 June – The BBC announces it has commissioned its award-winning Brexitcast podcast for television, launching on BBC One in September.
- 21 June – Danny Baker announces plans to revive his axed Radio 5 Live show as a twice-weekly podcast, launching in 2020.
- 26 June – Michael Palin will serve as executive producer on five Radio 4 specials to mark the 50th anniversary of Monty Python's Flying Circus.
- 27 June – Phone-in show Night Owls with Alan Robson is broadcast for the final time on north east commercial stations Metro Radio and TFM. Robson has presented the show since 1983.
- 28 June – Jonathan Dimbleby steps down as chair of BBC Radio 4's Any Questions?, having presented the programme for nearly 32 years.

=== July ===
- 5 July – Kirsty Young announces she is stepping down as presenter of Radio 4's Desert Island Discs. Cover presenter Lauren Laverne will continue in the role for the foreseeable future.
- 19 July – American Karina Canellakis becomes the first woman to conduct the First Night of the Proms (broadcast live by BBC Radio 3).
- 24 July – Nicky Morgan is appointed Secretary of State for Digital, Culture, Media and Sport, replacing Jeremy Wright.
- 29 July – Radio 1 announces the launch of a new early weekend breakfast show from 6 September. The show will run from Friday to Sunday and be presented by Arielle Free.

=== August ===
- 1 August – London stations Panjab Radio and Love Sport Radio swap frequencies.
- 2–4 August – BBC Radio 1's annual Ibiza Weekend takes place.
- 5 August – Ofcom clears Brexit Party leader Nigel Farage over comments made on his LBC show in March. Seven complaints were received by the regulator after Farage said that Channel 4 News journalist Jon Snow "should be attacked" for comments he made about a pro-Brexit rally, but Farage is cleared of breaching Ofcom rules because he clarified that any attack should be verbal.
- 28 August–3 September – Global launches five more stations on DAB – Heart 90s (28 Aug), Heart 70s (30 Aug), Capital XTRA Reloaded (2 September), Smooth Country and Smooth Chill.

=== September ===
- 2 September –
  - Bauer begins to network its Hits Radio Manchester weekday Drivetime show on all but one of its Hits Radio stations in England, leaving only the weekday breakfast show as a local show following the removal in July of the one remaining local weekend programme.
  - Smooth Radio's networked Drivetime show, presented by Angie Greaves, launches. At the same time, the number of breakfast shows drops to seven.
- 6 September – Launch of the new Radio 1 weekend early breakfast show presented by Arielle Free.
- 19 September – John Humphrys presents his final edition of Radio 4's Today programme after 32 years on the programme. Guests on his final edition include David Cameron, Tony Blair and Dame Edna Everage.

=== October ===
- 5 October –
  - BBC Sounds releases a 10-minute soundscape of The Archers as a podcast. The special episode depicts the soap's setting without characters, instead focusing on its background sounds.
  - A BBC Radio 1Xtra event at the Arena Birmingham is brought to a close early following the backstage assault of a rapper.
- 9 October – BBC political correspondent Chris Mason is appointed chair of Any Questions?, succeeding Jonathan Dimbleby. He will present the programme from 18 October.
- 10 October – BBC Radio 1 offers anyone with radio experience the chance to present a one-off show as part of its Christmas schedule by inviting interested parties to send in a demo recording of themselves.
- 11 October – Europe's Biggest Dance Show takes place, with Radio 1 representing the UK.
- 18 October – Former Key 103 and Hits Radio Content Director Chris Pegg is appointed editor of BBC Radio Nottingham.
- 21 October – Ofcom rejects a listener complaint over a swearing incident on Planet Rock that occurred on 12 July. The expletive was accidentally broadcast over the introduction of a track on an unnamed show that is usually prerecorded but was going out live on that particular day.
- 22 October – Ben Cooper, the Controller of BBC Radio 1, announces his intention to step down from the position after eight years, and to leave the BBC in early 2020.
- 23 October – Talksport has written to Ofcom to request permission to reduce transmission on its mediumwave frequencies by 2.4%. Ofcom have provisionally agreed to the request, but will wait to hear the views of stakeholders before making a final decision.
- 25 October – Manx Radio secures further funding from the Isle of Man Government to help it maintain its future. The station will receive almost £1m in 2020 after the Tynwald, the Isle of Man's parliament, approved a further £95,000 of funds.
- 28 October – Global Radio relaunches LBC London News as a national 24-hour rolling news channel titled LBC News.
- 31 October –
  - Ofcom awards Bailiwick Broadcasting a DAB digital radio multiplex licence for the Bailiwicks of Jersey and Guernsey; three bids were made for the licence.
  - Little Britain returns for a one-off Radio 4 Brexit-themed special titled Little Brexit, aired to coincide with the date on which Prime Minister Boris Johnson had wanted Britain to leave the European Union.

=== November ===
- 5 November – BBC Radio Norfolk breakfast presenter Nick Conrad leaves his post in order to put his name forward as a Conservative Party candidate for the Broadland constituency at the general election on 12 December. However, two days later he announces that he will not contest the seat following "ill-judged comments" he made on the radio about a rape case back in 2014.
- 12 November –
  - The Fox, a radio station based in the Cotswolds, is reported to be the first in the UK to ban Christmas songs from its playlist.
  - Former BBC Radio Solent, Radio Plymouth and Radio Exe presenter Simon Jupp is selected to stand for parliament in East Devon as a Conservative candidate.
- 13 November –
  - Ofcom extends the closure date of the consultation on Talksport's plans to reduce its mediumwave broadcasting. The period, due to close on 13 November, is extended to 28 November.
  - London Greek Radio celebrates its 30th anniversary on air, making it the UK's longest running ethnic radio station to hold an FM licence.
- 14 November – Ofcom gives its approval to change the format of six Quidem-owned stations – Banbury Sound, Rugby FM and the four Touch FM stations – to rhythmic-based, music-led services for listeners aged 15–29. The decision comes after Quidem entered into a deal with Global Radio to rebrand Quidem stations with one of Global's networks.
- 18 November – Absolute Radio launches its sixth decades-only station, Absolute Radio 10s which, unlike its sister stations, operates exclusively online.
- 21 November – Bauer launches Magic at the Musicals on DAB+ in and around London. Presenters include Ruthie Henshall and Jonathan Bailey.
- 26 November –
  - Absolute Radio 80s announce plans for a series of programmes presented by Paul Gambaccini to celebrate their tenth anniversary on air. Dave Berry will also give away £80,000 on the breakfast show.
  - It is announced that Adam Singer will step down as Chairman of Digital Radio UK after a decade in the post. He will be replaced by Will Harding, Global's Chief Strategy Officer, who will take up the role from early 2020.
- 27 November – Global Radio confirms that Capital FM will replace the Quidem stations it has acquired.

=== December ===
- 2 December –
  - Quidem's six local stations in the south east Midlands become part of the Capital network. They operate as Capital Mid-Counties, sharing all programmes with the Capital network apart from a local weekday drivetime show.
  - Steve Penk announces the closure of his stations The Music Channel and Radio Dead after they became financially unsustainable. A third station of his, The Wind-Up Channel will close by the end of December.
- 4 December – BBC Radio 1 announces the 35 people who will get a chance to present a one-off show over the festive period; the station received over a thousand entries after inviting anyone with radio experience to send in a demo.
- 6 December – LBC announces plans to broadcast its election night coverage both on radio and in HD video on Global Player.
- 17 December – Rhod Sharp announces he will leave BBC Radio 5 Live in early 2020.
- Undated in December – Wireless Group revives Virgin Radio Groove. Like the other Virgin spinoffs station, Virgin Radio Groove relays the Chris Evans Breakfast Show. The station had previously been on air between 2000 and 2008.

== Station debuts ==
- 7 January – Greatest Hits Radio
- 2 February – Buchan Radio
- 1 March – Smooth Country
- 4 March – Scala Radio
- 5 April – Country Hits Radio
- 21 June – Heart Dance
- 28 August – Heart 90s
- 30 August – Heart 70s
- 2 September – Capital XTRA Reloaded
- 3 September – Smooth Chill
- 18 November – Absolute Radio 10s
- 21 November – Magic at the Musicals

== Programme debuts ==
- 5 July – Radio 1's Party Anthems (2019 – present)
- 2 August – Party's Over on BBC Radio 4 (2019–2022)

== Podcast debuts ==
- 31 March – RunPod (presented by Jenni Falconer) released by Global Player (2019–Present)

== Continuing radio programmes ==
=== 1940s ===
- Desert Island Discs (1942 – present)
- Woman's Hour (1946 – present)
- A Book at Bedtime (1949 – present)

=== 1950s ===
- The Archers (1950 – present)
- The Today Programme (1957 – present)

=== 1960s ===
- Farming Today (1960 – present)
- In Touch (1961 – present)
- The World at One (1965 – present)
- The Official Chart (1967 – present)
- Just a Minute (1967 – present)
- The Living World (1968 – present)

=== 1970s ===
- PM (1970 – present)
- Start the Week (1970 – present)
- You and Yours (1970 – present)
- I'm Sorry I Haven't a Clue (1972 – present)
- Good Morning Scotland (1973 – present)
- Newsbeat (1973 – present)
- File on 4 (1977 – present)
- Money Box (1977 – present)
- The News Quiz (1977 – present)
- Feedback (1979 – present)
- The Food Programme (1979 – present)
- Science in Action (1979 – present)

=== 1980s ===
- Steve Wright in the Afternoon (1981–1993, 1999 – 2022)
- In Business (1983 – present)
- Sounds of the 60s (1983 – present)
- Loose Ends (1986 – present)

=== 1990s ===
- The Moral Maze (1990 – present)
- Essential Selection (1991 – present)
- Essential Mix (1993 – present)
- Up All Night (1994 – present)
- Wake Up to Money (1994 – present)
- Private Passions (1995 – present)
- In Our Time (1998 – present)
- Material World (1998 – present)
- Scott Mills (1998–2022)
- The Now Show (1998 – present)

=== 2000s ===
- BBC Radio 2 Folk Awards (2000 – present)
- Big John @ Breakfast (2000 – present)
- Sounds of the 70s (2000–2008, 2009 – present)
- Dead Ringers (2000–2007, 2014 – present)
- Kermode and Mayo's Film Review (2001 – present)
- A Kist o Wurds (2002 – present)
- Fighting Talk (2003 – present)
- Jeremy Vine (2003 – present)
- The Chris Moyles Show (2004–2012, 2015 – present)
- Annie Mac (2004–2021)
- Elaine Paige on Sunday (2004 – present)
- The Bottom Line (2006 – present)
- The Christian O'Connell Breakfast Show (2006 – present)
- The Unbelievable Truth (2006 – present)
- Radcliffe & Maconie (2007 – present)
- The Media Show (2008 – present)
- Newsjack (2009 – present)
- Paul O'Grady on the Wireless (2009–2022)
- Alan and Mel's Summer Escape (2009–2020)

=== 2010s ===
- Graham Norton (2010–2020)
- The Third Degree (2011 – present)
- BBC Radio 1's Dance Anthems (2012 – present)
- Late Night Graham Torrington (2012–2020)
- Sounds of the 80s (2013 – present)
- Question Time Extra Time (2013 – present)
- The Show What You Wrote (2013 – present)
- Friday Sports Panel (2014 – present)
- Stumped (2015 – present)
- Brexitcast (2017–2020)
- The Nigel Farage Show (2017–2020)
- You, Me and the Big C (2018–present)

== Ending this year ==
- 4 January – Alex Lester at Breakfast (2017–2019)
- 9 May – The Danny Baker Show
- 13 May –
  - Good Morning Wales
  - Good Evening Wales
- 18 May – Eurovision Song Contest (1956–2019, 2021–present)

== Closing this year ==
Date	Station	Debut(s)
7 January	Free Radio 80s	2012
31 May	Radio Ceredigion	1992
1 September	Arrow	2001
2 September	Chill	2005

== Deaths ==
- 10 January – Dianne Oxberry, 51, radio and television presenter (BBC Radio 1, North West Tonight)
- 1 February – Jeremy Hardy, 57, comedian (Jeremy Hardy Speaks to the Nation)
- 2 April – Bill Heine, 74, broadcaster (BBC Radio Oxford)
- 23 April – Edward Kelsey, 88, actor (The Archers)
- 30 May – John Tidmarsh, 90, journalist and broadcaster with BBC World Service
- 1 June – John Myers, 60, radio executive and presenter
- 23 August – Sheila Steafel, 84, actress (Week Ending)
