= Capital Dance =

British dance music radio station

- United Kingdom
- Frequency: DAB: 11D

Programming
- Language: English
- Format: Electronic dance music

Ownership
- Owner: Global
- Sister stations: Capital UK; Capital Xtra; Capital Xtra Reloaded; Heart Dance; Capital Chill

History
- First air date: 1 October 2020

Links
- Website: https://capitaldance.com

Capital Dance is a national digital radio station in the United Kingdom, owned and operated by Global and run as a spin-off from Capital. The station broadcasts from studios at Leicester Square in London alongside its siblings Capital, Capital Xtra and Capital Chill. The station predominantly plays contemporary and current electronic dance music. Capital Dance broadcasts nationally, transmitted on Digital One in the DAB+ format, and online. To enable the addition of the station to Digital One, several other Global stations on the platform, including Capital UK, Heart UK, Capital XTRA Reloaded, Gold and Heart 70s, saw a reduction in their broadcast bandwidth.

As of May 2025, the station broadcasts to a weekly audience of 1.052 million, according to RAJAR.

== History ==
The station's launch at 4 pm on 1 October 2020 followed both the establishment in 2019 of Global's Heart Dance as an older-skewing classic and contemporary dance and rhythmic music station, and the decision to reorientate Capital Xtra back towards predominantly playing Black and urban music genres. One week after the launch of Capital Dance, the BBC Radio 1 Dance stream was launched on BBC Sounds; the BBC's plans for this had been announced before Capital Dance was revealed.

Following the successful launch of the station, a breakfast show hosted by Rio Fredrika was added to the station schedule from 4 January 2021, with former KISS presenter Charlie Powell joining the station as well. Later, in July 2021, shows hosted by Karen Nyame (known on-air as KG) and Jess Bays were added to the schedule.

As part of schedule changes across the whole of the Capital network in October 2022, Matty Chiabi, Meg McHugh, and Zofia all joined the station as presenters. At the same time, Rio Fredrika left Capital Dance to present a weekday show on Capital UK, with Charlie Powell taking over the breakfast show slot.

On 31 October 2023, Capital Dance announced that a new show would launch on Friday and Saturday nights called Club Capital Dance, hosted by two new presenters, Sam Lavery and Sarah Devine. This replaced the Capital Weekender, which still airs on Capital UK.

A revised schedule from February 2025 saw Sam Lavery move to the Capital Weekender and Sarah Devine to Capital Dance weekday afternoons, with cover presenters Max Tyler and Hannah Rose hired to take over Club Capital Dance on weekend evenings permanently.

== Current presenters ==
- Charlie Powell (weekdays 7–11am and Saturday 12–4pm)
- Sarah Devine (weekdays 12–4pm)
- MistaJam (weekdays and Saturday 4–7pm)
- Zofia (Monday–Thursday 7–10 pm)
- Max Tyler (Club Capital Dance; Friday & Saturday 7–10pm)
- Hannah Rose (Club Capital Dance; Friday & Saturday 10pm–1am and Sunday 12–4pm)
