= Gold (British radio network) =

United Kingdom oldies radio network

Gold Radio
- United Kingdom
- Frequencies: DAB+: 11D/12A (UK) Digital One; DAB: 11C (Cambridge and North West Essex); DAB: 10B (Derby and East Staffordshire); DAB: 11B (Leicester and Tamworth); DAB+: 12C (CE Digital London 1); DAB: 10C (Northampton, Rugby and Lutterworth); DAB: 12C (Nottingham); DAB: 12C (CE Digital Manchester and Stoke); DAB: 12D (Peterborough, Kings Lynn and South Lincolnshire); Freesat: 722; Sky (UK only): 0119; Virgin Media: 923

Programming
- Language: English
- Format: Oldies

Ownership
- Owner: Global
- Sister stations: Heart 70s; Heart 80s; Heart 90s; Smooth Radio; Smooth Country

History
- First air date: 3 August 2007 in the UK
- Former names: Gold
- Former frequencies: 945 AM (Derbyshire); 999 AM (Nottinghamshire); 1152 AM (Norfolk and Suffolk); 1332 AM (Cambridgeshire); 1458 AM (Manchester); 1548 AM (London); 1557 AM (Northamptonshire)

Links
- Webcast: Global Player
- Website: Gold

Gold Radio is a network of oldies radio stations in the United Kingdom, which was formed by the merger of the Capital Gold network and the Classic Gold network in August 2007. Most programming is broadcast from the Global Radio studios in Leicester Square, London.

The station relaunched in March 2014 as a partly-automated service, broadcasting in fewer areas, after many of Gold's local AM/DAB frequencies were transferred to Smooth Radio. The station ceased broadcasting on AM in London on 29 September 2023 leaving Manchester as the only area receiving Gold on analogue radio. On 12 April 2024 the Gold website posted that the final AM transmitter would close at the end of the month.

As of September 2024, the network broadcasts to a combined weekly audience of 1.8 million, according to RAJAR.

== History ==
The Capital Gold network started in London in 1988 on Capital Radio's AM frequency, as the Government urged radio stations to end simulcasting (broadcasting the same programmes simultaneously on AM and FM) and threatened to remove one of their frequencies if simulcasting continued. The Classic Gold network was similarly formed from the AM transmissions of the former GWR Group's station licence areas. (Many of the FM pop stations to which the Gold stations were sister operations are themselves now part of the Heart or Capital networks.)

The original presenters on the early incarnation of Capital Gold included Tony Blackburn, Kenny Everett and David Hamilton. The hiring of radio personalities to host networked shows continued to be a feature of the Capital Gold and Classic Gold networks as they grew, though following the 2014 relaunch Gold only had three presenters.

=== Merger ===
Following the merger of Capital Radio plc and GWR Group plc to form GCap Media in 2005, a review of station assets was carried out by Chief Executive Ralph Bernard. One of the aims for 2006 was that Capital Gold would be carried on a national digital multiplex – enabling near-nationwide coverage – by the merger between itself and digital-only station Capital Life. However, following GCap's purchase of the Classic Gold Digital Network in April 2007, the former plan was scrapped, and it was decided to merge the two networks to form the "Gold Network" (this began at 7pm on 3 August 2007). The majority of the shows and presenters on the new station were taken from Capital Gold's former network, rather than Classic Gold's network, with the exception of Erika North, who was the co-presenter on the Classic Gold breakfast show with radio DJ Tony Blackburn. She co-hosted the new "Gold" breakfast show with James Cannon until December 2010; with Blackburn having quit the network completely, joining Smooth Radio. Local programming took the form of a voice-tracked show on weekdays between noon and 4pm.

On 28 June 2010, the local afternoon programming on Gold stations in England was dropped by Global Radio following changes in OFCOM regulation. This led to all stations receiving networked programme content from London, though split local advertising and news bulletins continued to be dropped into the networked output. The broadcaster continued to be required to deliver a four-hour local show for Wales, which was broadcast on both the South Wales (sister to Red Dragon/Capital) and North Wales & Cheshire (ex-Marcher) Gold stations.

Gold is now owned by Global Radio. A condition of Global's takeover was that the local stations in Birmingham, Coventry, Wolverhampton and Worcester had to be sold and were operated under a franchise to Orion Media. Orion Media ended the franchise agreement and relaunched its Gold West Midlands stations as Free Radio 80s on 4 September 2012.

=== Transfer of AM and DAB outlets to Smooth Radio ===
On 28 February 2014, Global Radio announced that all but four AM transmitters and three DAB transmission areas would be transferred to broadcast their recently acquired Smooth Radio station with effect from Monday 24 March 2014. Only London, Nottingham, Derby and Manchester would continue to receive Gold on AM frequencies, and London & Home Counties, Yorkshire, Leicester and Nottingham areas on DAB. These remained with Gold as Smooth Radio is broadcast on FM in London, the North West and the East Midlands, and the Yorkshire DAB broadcast was a relay of the London service. Global encouraged listeners not in these areas to move to Smooth Radio, or else continue to listen to Gold via satellite, cable, or internet streaming.

=== Expansion of DAB outlets ===
On 7 September 2015, Global Radio announced Gold would take over the local DAB multiplex slots previously occupied by XFM, following the latter's rebrand as Radio X and its move to the Digital One national multiplex on 21 September 2015. The announcement said Gold would become available again on DAB in Manchester, Birmingham, Ayr, Bournemouth, Cambridge, Cornwall, Exeter/Torbay/North Devon, Kent, Norwich, Peterborough, Plymouth, Reading/Basingstoke, Southend/Chelmsford, on the Sussex Coast and in Swindon. This is in addition to Gold's existing DAB availability in London, Nottinghamshire, Derbyshire, Leicestershire and Yorkshire.

On Monday 10 June 2019, Gold expanded to transmit nationally via the Digital One DAB+ multiplex; the station had been using DAB+ for its transmission in London since early 2019. The relaunch as a national service was accompanied by a new breakfast show hosted by DJ James Bassam, joining from sister station Capital.

In September 2019, many of the local-level DAB transmissions of Gold were transferred to a new service, Smooth Country. Gold continues to broadcast on DAB in the East Midlands, where Smooth Country took the place of Smooth Chill.

Following the relaunch of Connect FM as part of Smooth East Midlands on 1 October 2019, Gold programming returned to the AM and local DAB platforms in Cambridgeshire and Northamptonshire, reversing the change made to these frequencies in 2014.

=== Closure of AM transmitters ===
The early years of the 2020s saw Global withdraw from AM transmission and by 2023, Gold only remained on AM in Manchester and London. August 2023 saw Global announce that Gold would end its AM broadcasting in London and just before midnight on 29 September 2023 the final song played on Gold 1548 London was the song that had launched Capital Radio nearly half a century earlier - 'Bridge over Troubled Water'. Programming then ceased, and a retuning announcement was played until closure of the transmitter just before 1100. The Gold London outlet continues on DAB. Gold on AM in Manchester ended at the end of April 2024.

On 12 September 2024, the station was rebranded as Gold Radio with the new strapline "All Time Classics".

== Radio stations ==
=== On digital radio ===
- Gold Radio Cambridgeshire (DAB)
- Gold Radio East Midlands (DAB)
- Gold Radio Manchester (DAB)
- Gold Radio Northamptonshire (DAB)
- Gold Radio London (DAB)
- Gold Radio UK (Nationally) (DAB+ and digital TV)
- Freesat: 722
- Sky: 0121
- Virgin Media: 923

=== Former Gold stations (now Smooth Radio) ===
- Gold Berkshire and North Hampshire (DAB)
- Gold Bristol and Bath (DAB)
- Gold Cumbria (DAB)
- Gold Dorset (AM & DAB)
- Gold Essex (AM & DAB)
- Gold Exeter and Torbay (DAB)
- Gold Gloucester (AM & DAB)
- Gold Herts, Beds & Bucks (AM & DAB)
- Gold Humberside (DAB)
- Gold Kent (AM & DAB)
- Gold Norfolk and North Suffolk (AM & DAB)
- Gold North East Wales and Cheshire West (AM & DAB)
- Gold North-East England (DAB)
- Gold North West England (DAB)
- Gold Oxfordshire (DAB)
- Gold Plymouth (AM & DAB)
- Gold South Hampshire (AM & DAB)
- Gold South Wales (DAB)
- Gold Suffolk (AM)
- Gold Sussex (AM & DAB)
- Gold South Yorkshire (DAB)
- Gold Swindon/Wiltshire (AM & DAB)
