= Heart 10s =

British digital radio station

- The station's logo since its launch date in 2024.
- London; United Kingdom
- Broadcast area: United Kingdom
- Frequencies: DAB in London & Northamptonshire, Birmingham and Herts Beds Bucks

Programming
- Language: English
- Format: 2010s music
- Network: Heart

Ownership
- Owner: Global
- Sister stations: Heart 70s; Heart 80s; Heart 90s; Heart 00s; Heart Dance; Heart Love; Heart Musicals; Heart UK; Heart Xmas

History
- First air date: 12 September 2024

Links
- Webcast: Heart 10s on Global Player
- Website: Heart 10s

Heart 10s is a national digital radio radio station owned and operated by Global as a spin-off from Heart. The station broadcasts from studios at Leicester Square in London.

Launched on 12 September 2024, Heart 10s is a rolling music service playing non-stop “feel good” music from the 2010s. It has its own dedicated breakfast show, hosted by Adam O’Neill, 6–10 am weekdays. Adam O’Neill also presents a Saturday Breakfast show weekly, 8am-12noon. At other times, the station is mostly an automated service.

The station broadcasts on Digital One DAB in London, on smart speakers and online.

== Content ==
Heart 10s plays a selection of music from the 2010s.

== Programming and Presenters ==
Heart 10s programming is produced and broadcast from Global’s headquarters of Global in London. The breakfast show is produced live from its studios in Manchester. From its launch in 2024 until Feb 25 it was broadcast from Leeds until the Studios was closed due to local programming ending for Heart & Capital. Most of the network's output is automated, with a breakfast show hosted weekday mornings by Adam O’Neill.

The breakfast and weekend show is now broadcast from Monaco, with Adam O Neill moving there to present the breakfast show for Riviera Radio alongside Sarah Lycett. Adam still continues with his Heart 10s breakfast show.
