= Rio Fredrika =

English radio and television presenter (born 1995)

- Born: Rio Fredrika Debolla; 3 July 1995 (age 31)
- Other name: Rio Debolla
- Years active: 2012–present
- Employers: Capital FM; Capital Dance; The Playlist; MTV UK; Kiss FM

Rio Fredrika Debolla (born 3 July 1995) is an English radio and television presenter, DJ, and former model. She began her career in modeling before going into presenting. She gained prominence through her work with Capital and Capital Dance (2018–2024), and on CBBC's The Playlist (2019–2021). As of 2026, she works for Kiss.

== Early life ==
Fredrika is from South East London.

== Career ==
Fredrika began her career in modeling and signed with Models 1 in 2012. She modeled for brands such as Adidas, L'Oreal, ASOS, and Boohoo. She appeared in the music videos for Magalie's "First Kiss" (2014) and Fakear's "Skyline" (2015). She had a 2016 Galore feature with Cassyette and Ana Tanaka.

Fredrika began hosting content for Unilad in 2015, interviewing the likes of Jack Whitehall and Idris Elba. Fredrika was subsequently scouted by MTV UK to present for the network, making her debut in summer 2016. In 2017, she appeared in the revival special of MTV's The Grind in Malta with Becca Dudley. She also had her first radio gig Rio's Adventures with Hoxton Radio.

In 2018, Fredrika featured on Humza Arshad's 2018 Together TV panel series Wild Wild Web. Fredrika took part in a homelessness awareness campaign A Deed A Day with Lucien Laviscount, Zac Lichman, and Tanaka. For Christmas that year, the group ran a soup kitchen out of Laviscount and Lichman's The Shop NW10.

In December 2018, it was announced Fredrika had joined Capital FM for its 2019 lineup, co-hosting Friday night's The Capital Weekender with Sarah Story and Ministry of Sound from 10pm to 6am. Fredrika and Story had a joint slot at the 2019 South West Four (SW4). From 2019 to 2021, Fredrika was a presenter on CBBC's The Playlist alongside the likes of Vick Hope, Jordan North, Lauren Layfield, Dev Griffin, and Conor Maynard. Guests on The Playlist included Raye, Holly Humberstone, Benny Blanco, Mae Muller, Oti Mabuse, and Dodie.

In October 2020, Fredrika moved to the Monday Drive on the new platform Capital Dance. In December 2020, Fredrika became the new platform's inaugural breakfast host. In addition, she took on Saturday mornings across the Capital network from March 2022.

In October 2022, Fredrika took over Will Manning's mid-morning slot on Capital FM. She kept her Saturday show, while Charlie Powell took over Capital Dance Breakfasts. Also that year, Fredrika began taking on more gigs as a DJ, such as at Chelmsford City Racecourse.

Fredrika had a solo DJ set at the 2022 Jingle Bell Ball and a joint one with MistaJam at the 2023 Summertime Ball. She also broadcast backstage content from the Balls with other Capital presenters, such as Jimmy Hill. She conducted interviews on the Brit Awards red carpet. Fredrika took part in the Play Capital campaign, which starred Ed Sheeran, Dua Lipa, Stormzy, Niall Horan, and more.

In 2023 and 2024, Fredrika had D4 D4nce slot at O Beach Ibiza. She featured at the 2024 Wilderness Festival with Itchy Rich. In August 2024, Fredrika announced her departure from Capital after six years and intention to "take some time out".

On 17 April 2026, she joined the Kiss network, presenting weekends (7–11pm) on Kiss and weekdays (2–7pm) on Kiss Dance.

== Personal life ==
Fredrika has spoken about her experiences with eating disorders in her youth and is a mental health advocate.
