= Capital UK =

UK radio station

- England
- Broadcast area: United Kingdom and Malta
- Frequencies: DAB+: 11D/12A Digital One; DAB+: 6C Malta; DAB+: 12A Channel Islands; Freesat: 719; Freeview: 724; Sky Q (UK only): 0109; TalkTalk: 610; Virgin Media: 958
- Branding: The UK's No.1 Hit Music Station

Programming
- Format: Contemporary hit radio
- Network: Capital

Ownership
- Owner: Global Radio
- Sister stations: Capital Xtra; Capital Xtra Reloaded; Capital Dance; Capital Chill

Links
- Webcast: Global Player (United Kingdom); Global Player (London)
- Website: www.capitalfm.com/digital/

Capital UK is a radio station broadcasting across the United Kingdom and Malta via DAB and internet streaming, and is owned by Global and operates from the Capital radio network.

Capital UK is available nationally on digital radio, and instead of having separate programming, it shares the same schedule as Capital London, but without its local news and adverts.

The station was formed when the Galaxy stations across the UK were combined with Capital London, with the existing stations of the Hit Music network to form the new multi-station Capital network.

On Digital TV platforms it is available on:

- Freesat 719
- Freeview 724
- Sky Q 0109
- TalkTalk 610
- Virgin Media 958
