= Capital Xtra Reloaded =

British radio station

Capital XTRA Reloaded
- Birmingham; England
- Broadcast area: United Kingdom
- Frequency: DAB+: 11A

Programming
- Format: Classic urban music

Ownership
- Owner: Global Radio
- Sister stations: Capital XTRA; Capital FM; Capital Dance

History
- First air date: 2 September 2019

Links
- Webcast: Global Player
- Website: Capital XTRA Reloaded

Capital XTRA Reloaded, is a Global-owned radio station operated as a sister station to Capital XTRA. It broadcasts from Birmingham and is available on DAB Digital Radio in London, and on the Global Player app. Its output consists primarily of hip-hop, dance, garage, R&B and grime classics from the 1990s and 2000s.

As of September 2024, the station broadcasts to a weekly audience of 669,000, according to RAJAR.

== History ==
Global Radio announced in July 2019 that the station was to start broadcasting later the next month. Capital XTRA Reloaded launched on 2 September 2019.

At launch the station had one presented show each weekday, a four-hour mid morning show presented by Sacha Brooks. The number of presented programme hours has since been increased: an early afternoon slot on weekdays with Capital Xtra drivetime host Mike Panteli has been added; Ras Kwame has taken up Saturday and Sunday mid-daytime shows in addition to his duties on the main station; and in October 2020 former Choice FM presenter Jigs was added to the schedule with a one-hour slot on Sunday to Thursday evenings.

In May 2022 it was confirmed that Capital Xtra Reloaded would be removed from the national Digital One multiplex and transition to broadcasting in DAB+ in London only, to release a national slot for a new Heart spinoff station, Heart 00s, which would include a breakfast show hosted by former Capital Xtra and Reloaded DJ Mike Panteli, whose weekday show on Reloaded ended as a result of the move.

On 24 October 2022, the station returned to national digital radio on the Sound Digital multiplex.
