= Smooth 70s =

London; England
- Broadcast area: London and the Home Counties
- Frequency: 11B: (London 3)

Programming
- Format: Non-stop music from 1970–1979

Ownership
- Owner: Global Radio

History
- First air date: 27 December 2011 September 2024 (Relaunch)
- Last air date: 6 October 2013 (Original)

Links
- Webcast: Smooth 70s
- Website: Smooth 70s

Smooth 70s is a British radio station dedicated to music from the 1970s. Launched by GMG Radio as a sister station to Smooth Radio, it first aired on 27 December 2011, replacing a temporary station GMG had launched for the Christmas period. The station was broadcast through DAB on the Digital One multiplex and was also available online, where it could be accessed using Radioplayer. The station operated largely on an automated basis, but there was also some presenter input. Although Smooth 70s was not the first UK radio station to be dedicated solely to music from the decade, it was the first to be broadcast nationally. Audience data released by Radio Joint Audience Research Limited (RAJAR) in October 2012 indicated 749,000 listeners were tuning into the station on a regular basis. Global Radio–which bought GMG in June 2012–announced on 3 October 2013 that Smooth 70s would cease broadcasting from the early hours of 6 October.

In September 2024, Global announced the relaunch of Smooth 70s as part of an expansion of its portfolio that saw the launch of 12 spin-off stations, with Smooth 70s appearing on DAB in London and online on 12 September.

== History ==
The concept of a decade-themed radio station was first introduced by Absolute Radio, and in June 2011 GMG Radio decided to launch several stations through the online music streaming service we7 which would play particular types of music associated with the output of its stations. Three stations were launched under the Smooth Radio brand; Smooth 60s, Smooth 70s and Smooth Soul.

On 1 November 2011, GMG Radio launched a dedicated station playing nothing but Christmas music, under the brand "Smooth Christmas". The station, on the Digital One multiplex, had no news or advertisements but did promote Smooth Radio and broadcast until 27 December 2011. Smooth Christmas was subsequently replaced on a trial basis by Smooth 70s, playing tracks from the 1970s. The station was received positively by listeners, and in January 2012 GMG Radio confirmed a deal with US syndication firm Premiere Networks to air 1970s editions of the original American Top 40 show presented by Casey Kasem at weekends. Other early features included Disco Lunch and Late Night Love Songs, which continued to be among its weekday programming.

Smooth 70s was the first 1970s-themed radio station to air nationally in the United Kingdom, and as of August 2012 was still the only such station broadcasting nationally, but it was not the first dedicated to music from the decade. Absolute Radio had launched a similar station, Absolute Radio 70s, on 29 November 2011, but this was only available on DAB in London. However, Absolute 70s styled itself as the UK's only 1970s-themed radio station. From its launch, Smooth 70s predominantly operated on an automated basis, playing back-to-back music tracks, although some live programming was later added. Smooth 70s began with no news bulletins, but these were added in June 2012, together with travel updates, after feedback from listeners indicated a demand for these. Other features added to the line-up included Smooth Radio 70s at 7 with David Jensen, 2 TV Themes at 2 O'Clock and Weekend Themes.

In August 2012 the station compiled a Top 70 of the 70s chart after inviting its listeners to vote for their favourite hit from the decade. The chart, presented on Bank Holiday Monday, 27 August, by several presenters from the main Smooth Radio station, featured ABBA's Dancing Queen as its number one. In September 2012 the radio industry news website Radio Today reported that Simon Bates – host of Simon Bates at Breakfast on Smooth Radio – had started to present a separate breakfast show for Smooth 70s. Smooth Radio did not publicise the show, but confirmed Bates was providing "a little content" when asked about the programme. The content was "voice tracked" from his main breakfast show.

The station recorded its first official listening figures in October 2012, when Radio Joint Audience Research Limited (RAJAR) published the official audience figures for the third quarter of 2012. The statistics showed that 749,000 listeners were tuning into Smooth 70s on a regular basis. The final listening figures gathered for the station before it closed, and released in February 2014, showed a weekly audience of 804,000.

Smooth Christmas returned to the Digital One multiplex as a stablemate of Smooth Radio and Smooth 70s in the lead up to Christmas 2012.

Smooth 70s celebrated the 40th anniversary of the release of Pink Floyd's 1973 album The Dark Side of the Moon by playing it in full on the evening of 22 March 2013. (Note: It is rare, at least in the United Kingdom, for a radio station to play an album in its entirety.)

GMG Radio was bought by Global Radio in June 2012. On 3 October 2013, Global announced that Smooth 70s would close. The announcement came within a week of Smooth's operations being relocated from Manchester to Global's headquarters in Leicester Square, London. Smooth 70s ceased broadcasting in the early hours of Sunday 6 October. Its place on national DAB was taken by Capital Xtra.

In August 2019, nearly six years after the closure of Smooth 70s, Global resumed transmission of a 1970s music station over Digital One, with the launch of Heart 70s as a broadcast radio service (it had been operating as an online stream through Global Player since 2017). In September 2024, Global announced the relaunch of Smooth 70s as part of a launch of 12 new sister stations for its various networks, which would also include a Smooth 80s on national DAB. Smooth 70s began broadcasting on DAB in London, as well as online, on 12 September.

== Schedule ==
=== GMG era ===
- Smooth 70s Breakfast – Weekdays 6.00am–10.00am (Note: Smooth 70s Breakfast was presented by Simon Bates.)
- Mid-Morning Mini Concert – Two live tracks from 70s artists daily at 11.00am
- Disco Lunch – Weekdays 12.00pm–2.00pm
- 2 TV Themes at 2 – Weekdays at 2.00am and 2.00pm (Note: 2 TV Themes at 2 did not air on Friday afternoons.)
- Smooth Radio 70s at 7 with David Jensen – Weekdays 7.00pm–8.00pm (Note: Smooth Radio 70s at 7 was simulcast live with Smooth Radio where it was part of David Jensen's Drivetime show.)
- Late Night Love Songs – Weekdays and Saturdays 10.00pm–Midnight
- Casey Kasem's American Top 40 – Saturdays and Sundays 9.00am–12.00pm (or to 1.00pm if a four-hour show)
- The Saturday Night Party – Saturdays 6.00pm–10.00pm
- Weekend Themes – 2 themed songs hourly from Friday 2.00pm–Sunday 8.00pm
- Soul Connections – Sundays 2.00pm–4.00pm (Note: A programme of Northern Soul and 70s Soul presented by Richard Searling and Kev Roberts.)
- Sweeney's Million Sellers – Sundays 7.00pm–10.00pm (Note: Mike Sweeney played hits from the 1970s that sold over a million copies.)
- The Takeover – Occasional Sunday afternoon show presented by famous singers or groups from the 1970s

=== Global era ===
Global's Smooth 70s currently runs an entirely automated schedule consisting of five daily programming blocks:

- Wake Up with Smooth 70s – 4.00am–8.00am
- Smooth 70s Mornings – 8.00am–12.00pm
- Smooth 70s Afternoons – 12.00pm–6.00pm
- Smooth 70s Evenings – 6.00pm–10.00pm
- Smooth 70s Late Night – 10.00pm–4.00am

== See also ==
- 1970s nostalgia
