= The EE Official Big Top 40 From Global =

UK music chart radio programme

The EE Official Big Top 40 from Global
- Genre: Top 40
- Running time: 180 minutes (4:00 pm – 7:00 pm)
- Country of origin: United Kingdom
- Language: English
- Home station: Global's London studios
- Syndicates: Capital; Heart
- Hosted by: Will Manning
- Produced by: Zoe Piner & Gemma Nash
- Original release: 14 June 2009 – present
- Website: www.bigtop40.com

The EE Official Big Top 40 from Global is a radio chart show broadcast every Sunday from 4 to 7pm on Global's Capital and Heart networks, presented by Will Manning.

The show started on 14 June 2009, with "When Love Takes Over" by David Guetta featuring Kelly Rowland becoming the show's first number 1. There have been 405 number one songs as of 1 November 2026 with the current being Babydoll by Jamie Miller.

== Format ==
The EE Official Big Top 40 begins with a recap of the previous week's Top 10 songs, followed by a countdown of the 40 biggest songs from the last seven days. A recap is broadcast after every 10 songs, apart from the top 10 which is recapped after 9 songs. Interviews with the artists making that particular week's chart, competitions, calls with listeners and advertisements make up the remaining airtime. The number 1 song is announced just before 7pm. The week's chart is subsequently published on the Big Top 40 website after the show.

The chart is compiled based on iTunes sales, Apple Music streams, and radio airplay from the stations that broadcast the show. The algorithm differs to that of the UK singles chart, which includes physical sales, as well as downloads and streaming from all sources, but does not take radio airplay into account.

Each year is rounded off with the top 40 songs of the last 12 months, leading up to the biggest song of that year. It is known as the "chart of the year" that is broadcast on the last weekend of the year.

Will Manning is the programme's current host, having taken over from Marvin Humes and Kat Shoob in January 2019. The show is broadcast from Global's studios in Leicester Square, London.

In the case of the Summertime Ball (if held on a Sunday) and the Jingle Bell Ball, for which Capital provides backstage access, its sister network Heart continues to air the shows.

== History ==
The chart was launched as The Big Top 40 Show on 14 June 2009. Between 2010 and 2018, the programme was sponsored by Vodafone, becoming The Vodafone Freebees Big Top 40 (later The Vodafone Big Top 40 and The Official Vodafone Big Top 40). For the first time, listeners could change the chart during the show by downloading tracks on iTunes. Songs 40 to 11 are played before the new Top 10 is finalised at 6:10pm, with iTunes sales during the show taken into account. The show, originally produced by Paul Armstrong and Paddy Bunce, was the first real-time chart show broadcast on UK radio.

In September 2018, Bauer announced that their Hits Radio Network would stop carrying the show after the expiration of its contract at the end of 2018. Global, which produced the show, made the decision to withdraw the programme from syndication to the wider commercial radio network. The final show across the commercial radio network aired on 30 December 2018. The relaunched show, The Official Big Top 40, started in January 2019 and is widely available on Capital and Heart.

In March 2022, the show gained a new sponsor and was renamed The Sky VIP Official Big Top 40. After an appeal from the Official Charts Company to the Advertising Standards Authority, Global was ordered not to refer to the show as "The Official Big Top 40", and subsequently updated the name to "The Official Big Top 40 from Global".]

The show was not broadcast on 11 September 2022 due to the death of Elizabeth II. The day's chart was uploaded to their website.

In September 2024, the show gained a new sponsorship and was renamed to "The EE Official Big Top 40 from Global".

== Presenters and producers ==
Current presenters

- Will Manning (2019–present)
- Dev Griffin (cover)

Current producer

- Zoe Piner (2025-present)

Previous presenters

- Rich Clarke (2009-2013)
- Kat Shoob (2009–2018)
- Marvin Humes (2014–2018)
- James Bassam (cover)
- Sian Welby (cover, 2019)
- Pandora Christie (cover, 2026)

Previous producer

- Luke Prior (2019-2025)
- Richard Steel (2016-2023)
- Paul Armstrong (2009–2012)

== Records and statistics ==
The current Number 1 belongs to "Babydoll" by Jamie Miller (4 weeks)

The song holding the record for the most weeks at Number 1 is "Despacito (remix)" by Luis Fonsi and Daddy Yankee featuring Justin Bieber, at 11 non-consecutive weeks.

The songs that have spent the most consecutive weeks at Number 1 are "These Days" by Rudimental featuring Jess Glynne, Macklemore and Dan Caplen, (4 February - 1 April 2018) and "The Fate of Ophelia" by Taylor Swift (5 October - 7 December 2025) with 9 consecutive weeks each.

The artist with the most Number 1 songs is Ed Sheeran with 23 as of 2025, while the group with the most Number 1 songs is Little Mix with 8 songs as of 2021.
