= Global Academy =

The Global Academy

Location
- The Global Academy, The Old Vinyl Factory, Blyth Road; Hayes, Middlesex, UB3 1HA; England; 51.5046°N 0.4270°W

Information
- Type: University Technical College
- Established: 2016
- Local authority: London Borough of Hillingdon
- Department for Education URN: 142887 Tables
- Principal: James Murray-Walsh
- Gender: Coeducational
- Age: 14 to 19
- Enrolment: 300 (eventual: 800)
- Website: www.globalacademy.com

The Global Academy is a University Technical College located on The Old Vinyl Factory site in Hayes, London.

The UTC opened in September 2016 and is sponsored by the media and entertainment group Global and by the University of the Arts London.

On 20 April 2017, the academy was officially opened by the Duke of Cambridge and Prince Harry in their capacity as patrons of "Heads Together", a mental health charity. Two breakfast shows from Global radio stations were broadcast live from the Academy: Heart London Breakfast with Jamie Theakston and Emma Bunton and Nick Ferrari on LBC.

The academy has an online student radio station and TV channel, Youths Choice.

On 25 June 2024, James Murray-Walsh was appointed Principal of the Global Academy.

In March 2025, and following an Ofsted inspection, the Global Academy was awarded an outstanding rating.

In August 2025, 62% of the Academy's Year 13 students achieved Distinctions in their UAL Level 3 Extended Diploma, the equivalent of three A*s at A Level. In August 2026, 88% of its Year 13 students achieved Merit or above, with 47% securing a Distinction.
