= Heart UK =

- United Kingdom
- Frequencies: DAB+: 11D/12A Digital One, 12A Channel Islands
- Branding: This Is Heart

Programming
- Language: English
- Format: Hot AC
- Network: Heart

Ownership
- Owner: Global
- Sister stations: Heart 70s; Heart 80s; Heart 90s; Heart 00s; Heart 10s; Heart Love; Heart Musicals; Heart Xmas

History
- First air date: 29 February 2016 (as Heart extra); 12 March 2020 (as Heart UK)

Links
- Webcast: MP3 Stream
- Website: Heart UK

Heart UK (formerly Heart Extra) is a digital radio station owned and operated by Global as a national version of Heart, and broadcast from studios at Leicester Square in London.

On 2 February 2016, Global announced that the station would launch as Heart Extra on national DAB on 29 February. As Heart Extra, the station broadcast a presenter-free music sequence from 10am-4pm on weekdays, and simulcast Heart London programming outside this time.

On 14 March 2017, Heart Extra was removed from the Sky and Virgin Media TV platforms in favour of new sibling Heart 80s. Heart Extra continued to broadcast on DAB and online as before. Global closed Heart Extra on 12 March 2020 and replaced it with a full-time 'Heart UK' national feed.

== Heart Xmas ==
Heart Extra was rebranded as Heart Extra Xmas, a pop-up Christmas music service with the slogan 'Turn up the festive feel good!', during late November 2016. The pop-up festive offering was Global's successor to the prior Smooth Christmas service.

Following the retirement for Heart Xtra in March 2020, the station was rebrand as Heart Xmas following the station launch on 25 October 2020.

Heart Xmas has recently return on air on 25 September 2026 alongside the announcement for forthcoming Heart Christmas Live concert.
