= Smooth Radio (2014) =

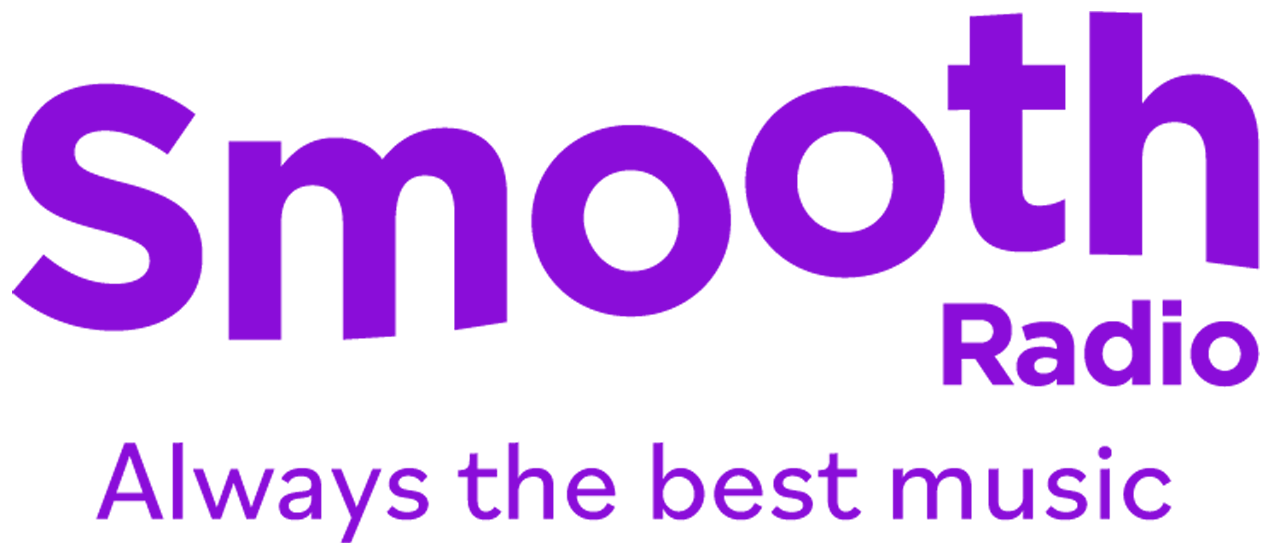
- London; United Kingdom
- Frequencies: FM: 97.2 MHz–107.7 MHz; DAB: 10B–12D; Sky (UK only): 0122; Virgin Media: 916; Freeview: 718; Freesat: 732
- RDS: Smooth
- Branding: Always The Best Music

Programming
- Format: Soft AC/MOR

Ownership
- Owner: Global
- Sister stations: Smooth Chill; Smooth Country; Smooth Relax; Smooth 70s; Smooth 80s; Smooth Soul

History
- First air date: 4 March 1990 (As Jazz FM); 4 October 2010 (As Smooth Radio)
- Last air date: 28 February 2025 (AM Network)
- Former frequencies: AM: 603 kHz–1557 kHz

Links
- Website: smoothradio.com

Smooth Radio is a network of local radio stations broadcasting on FM and DAB in the United Kingdom. It no longer broadcasts any outlets on AM since the last outlet on medium wave ceased at 1:00pm on Friday 28th February 2025. Smooth Radio previously featured a soft adult contemporary radio format but has introduced more upbeat music since 2023. Launched in March 2014, it replaced the national Smooth Radio that had launched in 2010 on FM and DAB, and most outlets of Gold on AM.

Each FM station broadcasts localised breakfast with networked shows simulcast from London at all other times. Four of the seven FM stations, and the former AM stations, are owned and operated by Global, with the remaining three FM licences owned by Communicorp UK and run as a franchise.

According to RAJAR, the network broadcasts to a combined weekly audience of 7.8 million with a listening share of 4.1% as of July 2025.

In January 2023, Smooth introduced a new logo and slogan, "Always the best music".

== Background and History ==
Having previously operated under a number of regional licences, Smooth Radio's owners, GMG Radio, merged its five English stations into one quasi-national station, launching the brand on the Digital One national DAB network on 4 October 2010. Most of the output was broadcast from Salford Quays in Manchester, with other programming coming from Castlereagh Street in London.

On 25 June 2012, GMG Radio's owners, Guardian Media Group, sold its radio division to Global at an estimated price of between £50 million and £70 million. (Note: A financial report released by Global Radio in December 2013 indicates the company paid £69m for its purchase of GMG.) Global renamed GMG Radio "Real and Smooth Radio Ltd." Several rival radio groups expressed their concerns over the takeover and the effect it could have on commercial radio in the UK. Ofcom launched a review of the sale, and it was announced that GMG Radio and Global would continue to operate as separate entities while the review was conducted. On 3 August the Culture Secretary Jeremy Hunt instructed Ofcom and the Office of Fair Trading (OFT) to examine Global's purchase of GMG, which gave Global over 50% of the UK radio market because of concerns the takeover may not be in the public interest. On 11 October, the OFT concluded that the merger could lead to a rise in local advertising costs because of the decrease in competitors, and forwarded the matter to the Competition Commission, which oversees business mergers and takeovers. On the same day the Competition Commission announced it would publish its findings into the takeover by 27 March 2013.

The Competition Commission published its final report into the acquisition on 21 May 2013, requiring Global to sell radio stations in seven locations. (Note: The stations involved were: Smooth or Capital (East Midlands); Real or Capital (South Wales); Real or Heart (North Wales); Capital or Real XS with either Real or Smooth (North West); Real or Smooth or Capital (North East); Real or Capital (Yorkshire); and Real or Capital (Scotland)) Global appealed the decision, but this was rejected by the Competition Appeal Tribunal in November. Global announced in December that it would not contest the decision, and would instead begin the process of selling the assets as directed by the commission. On 4 February 2014, the Radio Today website reported that Ofcom had given Global permission to remove Smooth from the Digital One platform, and to replace it with a service playing music from the 1970s, 80s and 90s. Under this agreement, Smooth would continue to broadcast on its regional frequencies, but would be required to provide seven hours of local output per day. On 6 February, Global confirmed the sale of eight of its regional stations—including those with the Smooth Radio brand in the North West, North East and East Midlands—to the Irish media holdings company Communicorp. (Note: The eight stations were Smooth Radio North West, Smooth Radio North East, Smooth Radio East Midlands, Capital South Wales, Real Radio North Wales, Capital Scotland, Real Radio Yorkshire and Real XS Manchester.) Under a franchising agreement between the two firms, these stations would retain the Smooth Radio name, but relaunch airing a mixture of both regional content and networked programming from London. Smooth would also take over Gold's medium wave frequencies, except in London, Manchester and the East Midlands. Global announced later that month that Smooth would be relaunched on 3 March, and subsequently confirmed the Gold changes would take effect from 24 March, when the stations would begin simulcasting with Smooth Radio London. This also coincided with the return of local programming at breakfast and drivetime.

On 5 March 2018, Global added the former Lakeland Radio station to the network as Smooth Lake District following its purchase from the CN Group for an undisclosed fee.

Local weekend afternoon programming ended on 25 August 2019. Angie Greaves was announced as the new host of the national Smooth Drive Home, which began broadcasting on 2 September.

In October 2020, the AM frequencies which carried Smooth Radio in Cardiff and Newport were switched off because the site from which they are transmitted was being redeveloped, and the following month, Smooth Radio switched off its mediumwave frequencies in Luton and Bedford.

On 30 June 2023, Global switched off the AM frequencies which carried Smooth in Dorset, Gloucestershire, Wiltshire, Suffolk, Norfolk, Essex and Plymouth, with Sussex following suit three months later. All these localised versions of Smooth are continuing on DAB. In late April 2024, the Hampshire and Kent medium wave frequencies were also switched off and it was announced that the North Wales and Cheshire relay would follow later in 2024. This frequency was finally switched off on 28 February 2025, by which time it was the last medium wave frequency operated by either Global or Bauer, the two main commercial radio companies in the UK.

Smooth stations in England ended local and regional programming on 21 February 2025. Scotland and Wales retain their respective local programming.

== Current Network Lineup ==
- Jenni Falconer (Smooth London breakfast)
- Angie Greaves (The Smooth Drive Home on weekdays; Sunday mid-mornings)
- Tina Hobley (Sunday afternoons)
- Adil Ray (Saturday mid-mornings)
- Myleene Klass (Saturday afternoons)
- Margherita Taylor (Sunday afternoons)
- Kate Garraway (weekday mid-mornings)

== List of Smooth Radio stations ==
The Smooth network comprises 24 stations:

=== Stations across the UK ===
FM stations produced and broadcast local programming from their own studios from 6-10am weekdays until 21 February 2025. The former AM stations carried networked programming from London. Before its closure, the last remaining AM station in Wales carried networked programming content as broadcast from London, with the exception of a local opt-out programme from noon to 4pm on weekdays, as it had done under Gold. The FM stations are largely also carried on DAB. Digital TV platforms carry the Smooth UK version of Smooth, also now transmitted nationwide on Digital One in DAB+ – this carries the network programming output of Smooth London at all times, with national news and advertising.

==== FM radio stations ====
FM stations
Station	FM	DAB
Smooth East Midlands (franchise)	97.2, 101.4, 106.6, 106.8 & 107.4	10B (Derby); 11B (Leicester); 12C (Notts)
Smooth Lake District	100.1, 100.8 & 101.4	11B (North Lancs and South Cumbria)
Smooth London	102.2	12C (London)
Smooth North East (franchise)	97.5, 101.2, 107.5 & 107.7	11B (Teesside); 11C (Tyne & Wear)
Smooth North West (franchise)	100.4 (North West, North Wales and parts of West Yorkshire excluding Leeds)	10C (Liverpool); 12A (Lancashire); 12C (Manchester)
Smooth Scotland	105.2 (Glasgow and The West)	11C Glasgow; 12D Edinburgh
Smooth West Midlands	105.7	11B (Wolverhampton, Shrewsbury and Telford); 11C (Birmingham); 12D (Coventry)

The Smooth AM frequencies in Peterborough and Northampton, which had switched from Gold to Smooth as part of the 2014 reallocation, reverted to carrying Gold programming in 2019 as a result of Communicorp's relaunch of Connect FM as part of Smooth East Midlands.

The AM transmitters serving Wiltshire, Dorset, Plymouth, Gloucestershire, Norfolk, Suffolk and Essex ceased broadcasting on 30 June 2023, alongside the Gold network transmitters in the Midlands and East, and Smooth's AM transmissions in Sussex ceased three months later. Medium wave transmissions in Hampshire and Kent ceased in late April 2024, and those in North Wales and Cheshire were planned at the time to end later in 2024, but ceased broadcasting at 1:00pm on Friday 28th February 2025. In most of the affected areas, transmission of Smooth via alternate means, such as DAB, has continued.

==== DAB (former AM areas) ====
In several areas, local Smooth services have ceased transmitting on AM (usually due to the closure of transmitter sites) but continued to be provided on digital radio. These variants, being the siblings of Heart/Capital stations which remain available on FM, continue to follow the AM model of localised advertising and information alongside networked programming content, rather than taking Smooth UK as heard in other areas served only via digital radio.

- Smooth Berkshire and North Hampshire – was on 1431 and 1485 AM (switched off 15 May 2015)
- Smooth Bristol and Bath – was on 1260 AM (switched off 10 February 2016)
- Smooth Herts, Beds and Bucks – was on 792 and 828 AM (switched off 2 November 2020)
- Smooth South Wales – was on 1305 and 1359 AM (switched off 12 October 2020)
- Smooth North Wales and Cheshire – was on 1260 AM (switched off 28 February 2025)
- Smooth Dorset - was on 828 AM (switched off 29 June 2023)
- Smooth Essex - was on 1359/1431 AM (switched off 28 June 2023)
- Smooth Gloucester - was on 774 AM (switched off 28 June 2023)
- Smooth Hampshire - was on 1170 / 1557 AM (switched off late April 2024)
- Smooth Kent - was on 603 and 1242 AM (switched off late April 2024)
- Smooth Norfolk - was on 1152 AM (switched off 28 June 2023)
- Smooth Suffolk - was on 1170 and 1251 AM (switched off 27 June 2023)
- Smooth Sussex - was on 945 and 1323 AM (switched off 30 September 2023)
- Smooth Plymouth - was on 1152 AM (switched off 29 June 2023)
- Smooth Wiltshire - was on 936 and 1161 AM (switched off 30 June 2023)

In addition, the former Gold in Exeter/Torbay, which continued to operate on DAB after the closure of its AM transmission, transitioned to Smooth with the rest of the AM network in 2014.

==== Smooth UK ====
- DAB+ via Digital One (11D/12A) and Digi-Can TF (8A)
- Digital TV – Sky 0128, Virgin Media 916, Freeview 718, Freesat 732

=== Sister stations ===
==== Smooth Country ====
A country music radio station which, having launched as an online stream through Global Player and the Smooth website in March 2019, was established as a broadcast radio service on 3 September 2019. It has a presented weekday daytime show (hosted at launch by Eamonn Kelly, who also presents on Smooth Radio) and the service was added to a number of local DAB multiplexes, replacing The Arrow in London, Chill in the East Midlands, and Gold elsewhere.

==== Smooth Chill ====
This mellow and chillout music service launched on 3 September 2019, replacing Chill in the Global portfolio. The station is available in the DAB+ format in London, and was made available online through Global Player (which had not carried the prior Chill service) and the Smooth Radio website, with the Chill URL redirected to point to the Smooth site. The station re-launched nationally on 8 April 2020 on Digital One, broadcasting in 32kbps DAB+.

==== Smooth Relax ====
Following the conversion of Classic FM to DAB+ the prior week, capacity became available for the addition to Digital One on 8 January 2024 of a new soft adult contemporary service under the Smooth network. Smooth Relax reuses the format and slogan of "Your relaxing music mix", previously used by the main Smooth Radio network before its transition into playing a broader range of classic hits in the "Always the best music" era.

==== Smooth 70s ====
Launched on 12 September 2024 alongside Smooth 80s and Smooth Soul, Smooth 70s follows the same soft adult-contemporary format as Smooth Radio, but instead exclusively music from the 1970s era. The station has no presenters and broadcasts a 24/7, automated output.

==== Smooth 80s ====
Launched on 12 September 2024 alongside Smooth 70s and Smooth Soul, Smooth 80s follows the same soft adult-contemporary format as Smooth Radio, but instead exclusively plays music from the 1980s era. The station broadcasts a mostly automated output, with a weekday breakfast show being hosted by Smooth West Midlands breakfast host, Nigel Freshman.

==== Smooth Soul ====
Launched on 12 September 2024 alongside Smooth 70s and Smooth 80s, Smooth Soul is a station dedicated to Soul music. The station has no presenters and broadcasts a 24/7, automated output.

==== Smooth Extra ====
Smooth Radio also operated Smooth Extra, with the slogan Your Refreshing Music Mix. The station transmitted its own non-stop music output from 10am to 6pm every day, and relayed Smooth London at other times.

Smooth Extra launched in December 2014 as a result of the removal of the prior network Smooth service from Digital One (during November and December the slot had been used for Smooth Christmas). Originally broadcast in mono in the traditional DAB format, Smooth Extra and Heart Extra switched to stereo DAB+ transmission in summer 2019, enabling the addition of Gold and Heart Dance to the Digital One multiplex in the released capacity.

Smooth Extra was also broadcast on the Sky satellite TV system (channel 0146) from 1 October 2015, taking over the slot from The Arrow (which had itself replaced Real Radio there the year before, due to Real Radio stations becoming Heart). Smooth Extra was replaced by Heart Dance on Sky on 7 October 2019.

Smooth Extra closed at midnight on Thursday 12 March 2020 (along with Heart Extra) and was replaced with a national feed of Smooth on Digital One.

==== Smooth Christmas ====
Originally launched on DAB during the weeks preceding Christmas 2011, Smooth Christmas was a pop-up sister station launched by GMG, and was replaced by Smooth 70s at the end of December. Smooth Christmas returned to the Digital One multiplex as a stablemate of Smooth Radio and Smooth 70s in the lead up to Christmas 2012.

On 25 September 2024, Smooth Christmas was relaunched by Global, and made available on Global Player. It was launched alongside Heart Xmas, also a Global station dedicated to playing Christmas music. On the day of their launch, the Radio Today website described the difference between the stations: "Heart Xmas is more Mariah Carey and Michael Bublé whilst Smooth Radio, playing 'Always the Best Christmas Music', is more Elton John and Slade."

== See also ==
- Timeline of Smooth Radio
