= Old Vinyl Factory =

Complex of British buildings

The Old Vinyl Factory
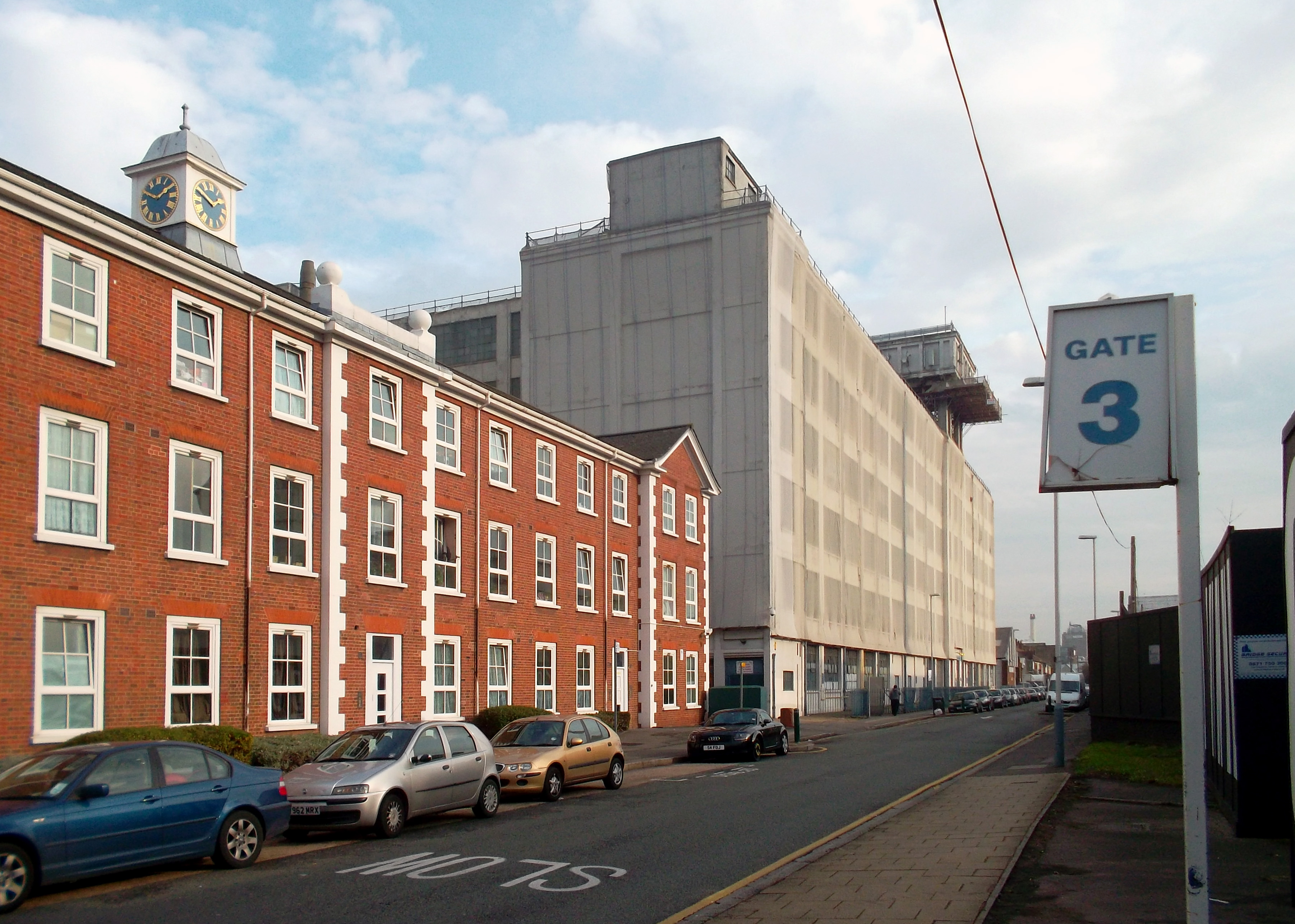
- View of the former headquarters (left) and Enterprise House on Blyth Road

- Location within London Borough of Hillingdon Location within Greater London
- Former names: EMI Laboratories
- Alternative names: EMI Buildings

General information
- Location: Blyth Road, Hayes, United Kingdom
- Coordinates: 51.505278°N 0.425833°W
- Groundbreaking: 9 February 1907
- Renovation cost: £250m (projected)

Design and construction
- Architecture firm: Wallis, Gilbert and Partners

Renovating team
- Renovating firm: U + I Group

The Old Vinyl Factory is a complex of buildings formerly owned by the British music company EMI in Hayes, within the London Borough of Hillingdon. The site was originally purchased by Gramophone and Typewriter Ltd and the buildings were designed by Wallis, Gilbert and Partners in the early 20th century.

While used by EMI, the site was responsible for the production of many thousands of shellac and vinyl records by 20th century musical acts, as well as radios and other broadcasting equipment.

In April 2011 the site was purchased for redevelopment by a joint venture of Cathedral Group PLC and Development Securities plc (now U + I Group). Under plans for £250 million of works, the site, covering 17 acres (6.9 ha), is to include commercial and residential units and a university technical college.

== History ==
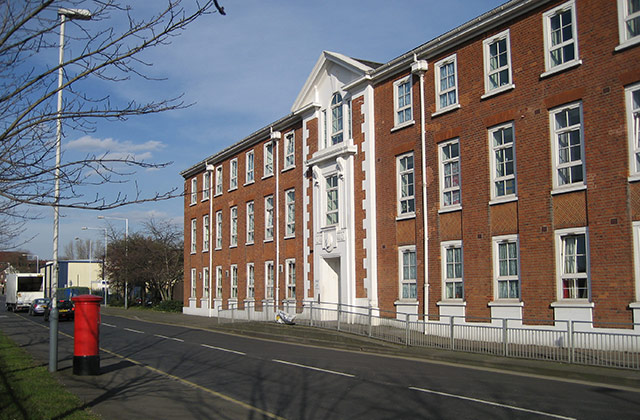
The former head office building

The Gramophone and Typewriter Ltd, the precursor to EMI, purchased the site in the early 20th century and began constructing the first buildings in 1907. The company had originally sold gramophones and discs imported from the US, and began making its own recordings in London in 1898. These were pressed at a factory in Hanover, Germany, until the Hayes Record Factory opened. From 1910, records bore the His Master's Voice trademark. The tenor Edward Lloyd took part in the groundbreaking ceremony. Vinyl records were produced from 1952.

What became the Cabinet Building was opened in 1911, after the Italian soprano Luisa Tetrazzini laid the cornerstone. The following year, a head office was built nearby on the site. During the First World War, the factory was used for the production of munitions.

During the period 1927–29, the site was further extended with alterations and additions designed by Wallis, Gilbert and Partners. The site covered 58 acres (23 ha) by 1929 and 7,500 people were employed across it.

The factories again returned to the production of munitions during the Second World War, as well as domestic radio receivers, which were marketed with some adaptations to households by the Home Office for £12. The site was bombed on 7 July 1944, killing 37 employees.

In 1952, EMI began the production of "microgroove" records, made of vinyl rather than the shellac-based compound used for earlier records. Artists of the time – including the Beatles, the Rolling Stones, Cliff Richard and Pink Floyd – had their vinyl records produced at the site. Production reached its peak in the 1960s at the Hayes site, which covered 150 acres (61 ha) and saw 14,000 people in work there.

In the 1970s, EMI moved its record-pressing operations to a different site, still within Hayes, and many of the buildings on the site moved over to defence electronics development and production.

== Redevelopment ==
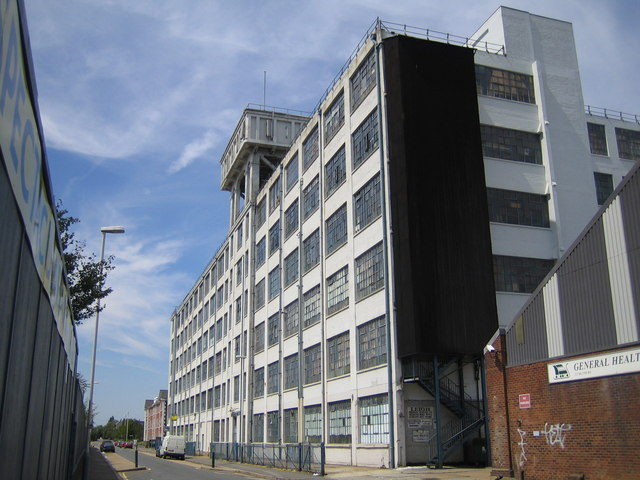
Enterprise House, part of the complex of former EMI buildings

The former head office building on the corner of Blyth Road and Trevor Road was converted to self-contained flats in around 2000 and was not part of the main project site. This is also true of Enterprise House.

The site was purchased in April 2011 by Purplexed, a joint venture between Cathedral Group PLC and Development Securities plc. The purchasers renamed the site "The Old Vinyl Factory" (from "London Gate Business Park"). The buildings on the site were renamed according to their former functions – one example being the "Shipping Building", which was where records were stored before being dispatched. Purplexed stated the redevelopment would cost around £250 million and that the company would give £40,000 to the London Borough of Hillingdon to cover the cost of putting the plan together.

A seven-storey block of flats was announced as part of the development in February 2012. Its name, the Gatefold Building, was chosen as an allusion to the gatefold sleeves of some vinyl records. Planning permission for the building was granted in February 2012.

The master plan for the entire site was approved by Hillingdon Council on 30 November 2012. It includes a new building, known as "The Picturehouse", which will house a cinema. There will also be offices, 500 flats, a museum, restaurants, landscaped areas and playgrounds.

By February 2015, Sonos, Host Europe Group and CHAMP Cargosystems had signed agreements to occupy the Shipping Building.

The Global Academy secondary school opened in 2016 on the site originally planned as "The Picturehouse". The "Gatefold Building" was completed by late 2016. In March 2017 a multi storey car park dubbed "The Music Box" was under construction at the west end of the site near Dawley Road and Bourne Bridge.

At the east end of the site and not officially part of the project are Paradigm Housing's 'The Stylus' on the former Damont Audio plot, as well as Bellway's 'Bluenote' which is the former Electropatent plot. Both of these projects will be of similar function to the rest of the redevelopment area with commercial units at ground level with residential above.

In autumn 2019, work was underway at the Powerhouse to create an innovation hub. Planning permission had been secured for 1 Vinyl Square on the plot west of the Global Academy, and permission was being sought for the Assembly Buildings completion.
