= Riviera Radio =

Monegasque radio station

- Monaco
- Frequency: 106.5 MHz

Programming
- Language: English

Ownership
- Owner: Global
- Sister stations: Riviera Relax

Links
- Website: rivieraradio.mc

Riviera Radio is an English language FM radio station that broadcasts to Monaco, Nice, Cannes, Antibes, and St. Tropez on 106.3-106.5 MHz. The station is also available worldwide on the internet, and as of December 2025, in the UK on Global Player.

== History ==
The station was once part of the Capital Radio Group, and was later owned by Grundy Media. Ashley Tabor-King, the founder and executive president of Global Media & Entertainment, began his radio career at the Riviera Radio. On 21 July 2025, it was announced that Global had acquired the station, their first outside the UK, after buying Riviera Radio from Grundy.

== Programmes ==
The Full English Breakfast with Adam & Sarah is hosted by Adam O'Neill and Sarah Lycett every weekday from 7am until after the 10am news. It features news bulletins from Global's newsroom in London (news bulletins were previously provided by the BBC), covering world/UK news together with local news from the South of France.

Prior to December 2025, the Drivetime Show with Anthony Yammine aired on weekdays in the afternoon from 3 till 7 with frequent news and traffic updates. During the show, Anthony also read out the 'what's on guide' which is used throughout the station's broadcast schedule.

On December 1st 2025, Riviera Radio received a makeover, with a new logo and branding package based on that of Heart Radio in the UK. In addition, a new line-up was launched, with Heart Radio UK's Ant Payne now presenting from 10am to 1pm, Heart's Pandora Christie on afternoons from 1pm to 4pm, and Matt Wilkinson (also from Heart) from 4pm to 7pm. Both Pandora and Matt's shows overlap into each other's own Heart shows in the UK due to the time difference between the UK and France. In addition, Capital's Tom Watts took over as new host of Club Classics from 7pm to 12am, which previously aired without any presenters. In addition, Gold Radio's James Bassam presents a new weekend show every Saturday and Sunday from 2pm to 7pm.

On January 5th 2026, it was announced that eight other presenters would join the station, with Capital's Aimee Vivian hosting weekend breakfast live from Global's Leicester Square studios from 6-10am. Four current Heart DJs also joined the line-up, as Heart 10s breakfast host Adam O'Neill joined to host weekends 10-2pm, and current Heart 00s breakfast host Fia Tarrant would also do Riviera's Evening show Monday to Thursday from 7-10pm. Heart's Ben Atkinson will host weekday overnights from 1am to 4am, Simon Beale Heart 80s breakfast will also present Sunday afternoons 2-7pm. Meanwhile four Smooth Radio presenters joined, with Darren Parks becoming the new host of weekday early breakfast, and Tina Hobley hosting the Evening show on Sunday nights. A new 10pm-1am late show also launched, with Paul Phear hosting Mondays to Thursdays, and Gary Vincent doing so on Sundays.

On June 22nd 2026, Adam O'Neill joined Sarah Lycett on the breakfast show. The programme is now titled as The Full English Breakfast with Adam & Sarah.
