= Heart 00s =

UK digital radio station

Programming
- Format: 2000s music
- Network: Heart

Ownership
- Owner: Global Media & Entertainment

History
- First air date: 20 May 2022; 2 years ago

Links
- Website: www.heart.co.uk/00s/

Heart 00s is a national digital radio station owned and operated by Global Media & Entertainment as a spin-off from the Heart radio network. The station broadcasts from studios at Leicester Square in London and was launched on 20 May 2022. Heart 00s has its own dedicated breakfast show, presented by Fia Tarrant. Ashley Roberts of the Pussycat Dolls is also a presenter, with a programme airing on Saturday evenings. At other times, the station is mostly an automated service. The station is available on the Digital One multiplex while Global migrated Capital Xtra Reloaded to being available via DAB+ in London only to make way for the launch of Heart 00s.

== Current presenters ==
Current presenters include:

- Fia Tarrant
- Ashley Roberts
- Kelly Brook
- Rachel Stevens
- Aston Merrygold

== See also ==
- Heart 70s
- Heart 80s
- Heart 90s
- Heart Dance
- Heart 10s
- Heart Love
- Heart Musicals
