= Pandora Christie =

British radio presenter

Pandora Christie (born 1982), also known as Pandora, is a British radio presenter. She is the current host of Heart Radio's mid-morning show.

== Background ==
Christie grew up in South London. Christie's mother suffered from alcoholism and died in front of Christie from a heart attack when Christie was nine years old. Christie has said that her memories of her life before she was nine years old are snapshots; she says that she can remember visits by social services' staff relating to both her, and her sister, being temporarily taken into care. She remembers being aged either five or six when her family were evicted and became homeless. She stated in 2018 that she had stayed close to a family who fostered her in her teen years and whose care and support she found particularly helpful.

== Career ==
Christie originally wanted to become a professional actor, and played the character of Jessica in the 2001 film Beginner's Luck. Early in her career in radio, Christie was a member of staff promoting Heart 106.2, before she worked at the community radio station Westside Radio; while at Heart, she handed out leaflets promoting the station and was involved in organising events promoting Heart. She was then given a role by Choice FM, a radio station in London playing Black music. She initially presented overnights on Choice FM, before presenting during the day on the station. Her daytime show was between midday and 4 pm. She was then offered a presenting role at Capital FM. She remained at Capital FM for 4 and a half years, presenting nationally. She maintained a personal lifestyle and beauty blog while at Capital.

Christie left Capital for Kiss FM in early 2017, presenting on the station and its spinoff, Kisstory, for 18 months before being replaced by Neev, who she herself had originally replaced. During her time at Kiss, Christie also presented her own show on the television channel 4Music, "Hit Afternoons With Pandora".

As of 2019, Christie was presenting on the QLive app game from News UK, in addition to her other activities within the media.

In April 2019, it was announced that Christie was joining Heart Radio to present a weekday show between 9am and 1pm, the first hour of which would not be broadcast on local Heart stations apart from Heart London; it was also announced that she would present Club Classics on Saturday evenings on Heart.

Christie now no longer presents between 9am and 10am on any Heart station; her show runs from 10am to 1pm on weekdays. She continues to present Heart's Club Classics on Saturday evenings nationally. Club Classics is also simulcast on Heart Dance. According to Alta Loma MGMT, her weekly audience on Heart was 4.6 million as of November 2024.

In 2022, Christie starred in a single West End theatre performance of the musical & Juliet. She played a number of roles in the performance. In 2024, Christie appeared as a contestant on Pointless Celebrities. In addition to her other media activities, Christie currently plays DJ sets at various events.

Christie is an ambassador for the Care Leavers Covenant and an ambassador for the Fostering Network. She has also been involved, in encouragement of people to foster, with the National Fostering Group.

== Personal life ==
As of 2022, Christie lived in Fulham, West London; she spoke about her love for Fulham in an interview with the London Evening Standard.

Christie's charity work includes organising a fundraiser which raised more than $5,000 for dogs in the Maldives.
