= Heart 80s =

British digital radio station

- London; United Kingdom
- Broadcast area: United Kingdom and Tenerife
- Frequencies: DAB+: (11D/12A); DAB+: Digi-Can TF (8A): Sky (UK only): 0110; Virgin Media: 921
- Branding: Non-stop 80s feel good!

Programming
- Language: English
- Format: 1980s music
- Network: Heart

Ownership
- Owner: Global
- Sister stations: Heart 70s; Heart 90s; Heart 00s; Heart 10s; Heart Dance; Heart Love; Heart Musicals; Heart Xmas

History
- First air date: 14 March 2017

Links
- Webcast: Heart 80s on Global Player
- Website: Heart 80s

Heart 80s is a national digital radio station owned and operated by Global as a spin-off from Heart. The station broadcasts from studios at Leicester Square in London.

Launched on 14 March 2017, Heart 80s is a rolling music service playing non-stop “feel good” music from the 1980s. It has its own dedicated live breakfast show, which since January 2024 has been hosted by Simon Beale (6–10 am weekdays and 8 am – noon Saturdays). At other times, the station is mostly an automated service.

The station broadcasts nationally on Digital One DAB and online alongside the existing Heart extra service. Shortly after its launch it replaced Heart Extra on television platforms. Like all of its Heart network sister channels, it is also broadcast via satellite on Astra 2G.

On 28 August 2019, the station switched its Digital One service from broadcasting in mono using DAB to a stereo service in the DAB+ standard. The surplus capacity vacated by this move was used the following day to add another sibling, Heart 90s in DAB+.

== Content ==
Heart 80s plays a selection of music from the 1980s.

== Programming and Presenters ==
Heart 80s programming is produced and broadcast from the headquarters of Global at Leicester Square in central London. Most of the network's output is automated, with a live breakfast show hosted by Simon Beale (Monday to Saturday). Guests on Simon's show have included Jason Donovan, Billy Ocean, Bonnie Tyler, Nik Kershaw, Boy George, Carol Decker, Hue & Cry, Martin Fry, Marti Pellow, Tony Hadley, Matt Goss, Midge Ure, Billy Crystal and Andrew Ridgeley, Pepsi & Shirlie (from Wham).

Since May 2024, Pat Sharp has been a relief presenter, covering for Simon Beale. Simon was originally on the main Heart network, often covering for Roberto - the original Heart 80s Breakfast presenter from 2017-2023.

=== Presenters ===
- Simon Beale (Heart 80s Breakfast)
- Pat Sharp (Relief Presenter)

=== Former presenters ===
- Neil 'Roberto' Williams (Heart 80s Breakfast)
- Jason Donovan (Heart 80s Rewind)
