= Heart Dance =

British radio station

- United Kingdom
- Broadcast area: United Kingdom
- Frequencies: DAB: 11D/12A Digital One; Sky (UK only): Channel 0128

Programming
- Language: English
- Format: Club classics/old school dance
- Network: Heart

Ownership
- Owner: Global
- Sister stations: Heart 70s; Heart 80s; Heart 90s; Heart 00s; Heart 10s; Heart Love; Heart Musicals; Heart UK; Heart Xmas

History
- First air date: 21 June 2019

Links
- Webcast: Heart Dance on Global Player
- Website: Heart Dance

Heart Dance is a British digital radio station owned and operated by Global as a substation of Heart. The station broadcasts from the Global studios at Leicester Square in London.

Launched on 21 June 2019, Heart Dance is a rolling music service playing club classics and old school dance hits (including modern-day remixes/reworkings of classic songs, and club classics that feature extracts taken from a classic song) from the late 1980s onwards. The station has a breakfast programme, hosted by Toby Anstis. Heart's Club Classics airing Friday and Saturday evenings on the main Heart station are simulcast with Heart Dance.

The station broadcasts nationally on the Digital One DAB multiplex and on Global Player. On 7 October 2019, the station launched on Sky channel 0146 replacing Smooth Extra.

== Presenters ==
- Toby Anstis (Heart Dance Breakfast, weekdays; Heart's Club Classics: Friday evening, simulcast with Heart)
- Pandora Christie (Heart's Club Classics: Saturday evening, simulcast with Heart)
- Rezzy Ghadjar (Main Relief Presenter)
