= Heart 90s =

British radio station

- United Kingdom
- Broadcast area: United Kingdom and Tenerife
- Frequencies: DAB+: 11D/12A Digital One DAB+: 8A (OpenDigitalRadio); Sky (UK only): Channel 0138

Programming
- Language: English
- Format: 1990s music
- Network: Heart

Ownership
- Owner: Global
- Sister stations: Heart 70s; Heart 80s; Heart 00s; Heart 10s; Heart Dance; Heart Love; Heart Musicals; Heart Xmas

History
- First air date: 29 August 2019

Links
- Webcast: Heart 90s on Global Player
- Website: Heart 90s

Heart 90s is a national digital radio station owned and operated by Global as a spin-off from Heart. The station broadcasts from studios at Leicester Square in London.

Launched on 29 August 2019, Heart 90s is a rolling music service playing non-stop “feel good” music from the 1990s. It has its own dedicated live breakfast show, hosted by Kevin Hughes, 6–10 am on weekdays. At other times, the station is mostly an automated service.

The first song played on the station was "Wannabe" by the Spice Girls. On 12 November 2019, the station launched on Sky channel 0217, following sister station Heart Dance launching on there a month earlier.
