= Digital One =

UK national commercial digital radio multiplex

- Licensed area: United Kingdom
- Frequency: 11D (222.064 MHz); England; Wales; Northern Ireland; 12A (223.936 MHz); Scotland
- Air date: 15 November 1999
- Owner: Arqiva

Digital One, also known as D1 National, is a national commercial digital radio multiplex in the United Kingdom, owned by Arqiva. As of March 2010, the multiplex covered more than 90% of the population from 137 transmitters. Coverage was extended to Northern Ireland in July 2013. It contains a list of DAB and DAB+ radio stations operated by Bauer Media Audio UK, Global Media & Entertainment and News Broadcasting.

== Stations carried ==
DAB

Service	Service ID	Bit rate	Audio channels	Description	DAB launch date	Analogue availability
LBC	C0C2	64 kbit/s	Mono	A national talk and phone-in station owned by Global Radio and also broadcast on 97.3 MHz in London.	11 February 2014	97.3 MHz (London)
Talksport	C0C0	64 kbit/s	Mono LSF	Sport and talk	15 November 1999	1053, 1071, 1089 kHz

DAB+

Service	Service ID	Bit rate	Audio channels	Description	DAB launch date	Analogue availability
Absolute Radio	C1C0	40 kbit/s	Stereo DAB+	Adult alternative music, carries London output during any programme splits, but with national news and advertising	15 November 1999	1197 kHz, 1215 kHz, 1242 kHz, 1260 kHz (closed in January 2023)
Capital Dance	C9ED	40 kbit/s	Stereo DAB+	Dance	1 October 2020	
Capital UK	C5DA	40 kbit/s	Stereo DAB+	Contemporary Hit Radio	12 September 2016	95.8–107.6 MHz
Capital XTRA	C37B	40 kbit/s	Stereo DAB+	Urban and Dance Music. Formerly branded as Choice FM; relaunched and renamed to coincide with its national DAB availability	7 October 2013	96.9 and 107.1 MHz (London)
Classic FM	C2A1	64 kbit/s	Stereo DAB+	Classical music	15 November 1999	99.9–101.9 MHz
GB News Radio	C4F0	24 kbit/s	Mono DAB+	Talk Radio (Right-Wing News)	4 January 2022	
Gold UK	CEE8	40 kbit/s	Stereo DAB+	Classic hits. Previously transmitted on local AM and DAB prior to D1 addition, having evolved from Capital Gold (1988).	10 June 2019	
Greatest Hits Radio 70s	C243	32 kbit/s	Stereo DAB+	1970s music	31 March 2025	
Greatest Hits Radio 80s	C244	32 kbit/s	Stereo DAB+	1980s music	31 March 2025	
Heart Dance	CFE8	40 kbit/s	Stereo DAB+	Rhythmic adult contemporary	21 June 2019	
Heart UK	CFD1	40 kbit/s	Stereo DAB+	Adult contemporary music	29 February 2016	96–107 MHz
Heart 70s	CAE9	32 kbit/s	Stereo DAB+	1970s music	30 August 2019	
Heart 80s	C1DC	40 kbit/s	Stereo DAB+	1980s music	14 March 2017	
Heart 90s	CBE9	40 kbit/s	Stereo DAB+	1990s music	29 August 2019	
Heart 00s	C9F3	40 kbit/s	Stereo DAB+	2000s music	20 May 2022	
Hits Radio 90s	C245	40 kbit/s	Stereo DAB+	1990s music	31 March 2025	
Hits Radio 00s	C246	40 kbit/s	Stereo DAB+	2000s music	31 March 2025	
Kiss UK	C5C0	40 kbit/s	Stereo DAB+	A London-based station specialising in hip hop, R&B, urban and electronic dance music owned by Bauer Radio. Also broadcast on FM in London, South Wales and the Severn Estuary, and East Anglia; all frequencies including D1 now share programme content	27 December 2012	97.2, 100, 101 and 106.1 MHz (closed in September 2024)
Kisstory	CFE6	40 kbit/s	Stereo DAB+	Old Skool & Anthems. Owned by Bauer Radio as a sibling to Kiss FM UK. Was broadcast on Sound Digital prior to D1 addition.	11 February 2019	
LBC News	C8EA	32 kbit/s	Mono DAB+	24-hour rolling news station with updates every 20 minutes.	28 October 2019	1152 kHz (London) (closed in Oct 2024)
Magic	C0C6	40 kbit/s	Stereo DAB+	Melodic soft adult contemporary hits.	1 January 2015	105.4 MHz (London)
Radio X	C4CD	40 kbit/s	Stereo DAB+	Rock station primarily playing alternative and indie music. Previously broadcast in mono on DAB from launch until moving to DAB+ on 25 October 2019.	21 September 2015	104.9 MHz (London) 97.7 MHz (Manchester)
Smooth Chill	C1C3	32 kbit/s	Stereo DAB+	Chill out, ambient and trip-hop music.	8 April 2020	—
Smooth Relax	C4FB	32 kbit/s	Stereo DAB+	Relaxing melodic hits.	8 January 2024	
Smooth UK	C6C0	40 kbit/s	Stereo DAB+	Melodic hits from the past five decades.	12 March 2020	96.4–108.0 MHz
UCB 1	C4CA	24 kbit/s	Stereo DAB+	Christian music	1 December 2009	—
UCB 2	CBD8	32 kbit/s	Stereo DAB+	Christian music		

== History ==
On 24 March 1998, the Radio Authority advertised for the first national ensemble to be broadcast on DAB, with the three Independent National Radio services on FM and medium wave required to be included in the ensemble - Classic FM, Talk Radio UK (now Talksport) and Virgin Radio (now Absolute Radio). The licence was awarded to the sole applicant, GWR Group and NTL Broadcast to form Digital One. The original licence application included the following stations:

Digital One Ltd (original application)
Classic FM	Classical music	GWR (now part of Global Radio)
Classic Gold Rock	Rock music	NTL
Club dance	Dance music	TBA
Plays, books and music	Comedy, drama and serials	TBA
Rolling news service	Rolling news	ITN
Soft AC	Female contemporary music	TBA
Sports channel	Live sports and comment	Talk Radio UK
Talk Radio (now Talksport)	Talk radio	Talk Radio UK (now owned by Wireless Group)
Teen and chart hits	Pop and dance music	GWR
Virgin Radio (now Absolute Radio)	Complementary rock music	SMG plc (station is now owned by Bauer Media)

Digital One was due to launch on 1 October 1999, but this was postponed until 15 November 1999, when it started broadcasting at 1:00 pm. It was officially opened by Mel C.

The "Classic Gold Rock" service eventually went on air as Planet Rock, which remains on air, having migrated from D1 to the Sound Digital multiplex in 2016; it is, however, the only one of the D1 launch stations (bar the INR simulcasts) still to be broadcasting as of 2017, and is also the longest-established DAB-first service in UK national radio, having been a digital-only service until 2013, when new owner Bauer put PR on their 105.2 FM frequency in the West Midlands (previously Kerrang! Radio); the FM berth was turned over to Absolute Radio in September 2015, leaving Planet Rock as a digital-only service once again. The "plays, books and music" service went on air as Oneword. The "Teen & Chart Hits" service became Core, and the "Soft AC" service – which was ultimately provided by the then Capital Radio Group (now part of Global Radio) was launched as Life (later known as Capital Life). The "Sports Channel" proposal was dropped as a separate entity and instead combined with Talk Radio in 2000 to form the current Talksport as broadcast on AM and DAB. ITN's rolling news service ultimately went on air as part of the multiplex, later joined by a business news service provided by Bloomberg. "Club Dance", however, never made it to air. The space released by the absence of the Club Dance and Sports Channel services from the eventual lineup was used to allow the Oneword service to end at midnight rather than the proposed 7pm, and also freed up a slot for a melodic easy-listening music service aimed at an older audience, the Saga-operated PrimeTime Radio.

After the closure of PrimeTime Radio in 2006, the original licence was amended to allow the launch of a new classic and contemporary jazz service, TheJazz which was launched on 25 December 2006, before 31 December 2006 deadline set in the licence amendment.

On 11 February 2008 GCap announced that it was selling its interest in Digital One to Arqiva and that "non-core" DAB stations Planet Rock and TheJazz would be closing by the end of March 2008. Whilst TheJazz ceased broadcasting at midnight on 30 April 2008, Planet Rock was sold off and remains on air. GCap also closed down their two other D1-only stations, Core and Capital Life, prior to GCap being taken over later in 2008 by Global Radio.

== Former services ==
Services previously carried on the multiplex include:

- Smooth Radio Christmas – festive music service, ran from 1 November until 27 December 2011 and operated again as a pop-up in Nov/Dec 2012, 2014 and 2015 (due to the launch of Capital Xtra there was not space for the service in 2013)
- Absolute Radio 80s – 1980s music service. Transferred to the Sound Digital multiplex on 29 February 2016.
- Absolute Radio 90s – 1990s music service. Moved onto Digital One from 2010 – initially sharing a slot with Absolute Radio Extra – having previously been provided on local DAB; returned to local-layer DAB in January 2015 so that its capacity could go towards the addition of Magic to Digital One. Absolute Radio 90s returned to Digital One during 2018 (replacing Magic Christmas), before migrating across to Sound Digital in February 2019, as part of a wider reorganisation of Bauer's space across national and local DAB, ahead of the launch of Scala Radio on SDL in March.
- Planet Rock – Classic rock music station. Transferred to the Sound Digital multiplex on 29 February 2016.
- Smooth Radio – Easy listening service relaunched in 2010 as national network; local content on local/regional FM frequencies was replaced with network output also broadcast nationally on Digital One. New owners reintroduced local content on local FM/DAB in March 2014 and withdrew Smooth from Digital One in November 2014.
- NME Radio (ceased on 12 July 2010)
- Panjab Radio (temporary service, ceased on 31 May 2010)
- Fun Kids (temporary service, ceased on 3 October 2009)
- Birdsong (ceased on 1 June 2009, replaced by Amazing Radio)
- TheJazz (ceased on 31 March 2008)
- Capital Life (ceased on 31 March 2008)
- Core (ceased on 11 January 2008, immediately replaced by BFBS Radio)
- Oneword (ceased on 11 January 2008 because of financial problems, replaced by Birdsong – see the section below)
- Primetime (ceased on 24 May 2006, replaced by theJazz on 25 December 2006)
- D1 Temp (ceased on 9 June 2005 – see the section below)
- Bloomberg (ceased on 6 December 2003, replaced by D1 Temp)
- ITN (ceased on 1 July 2003)
- Smooth Radio 70s (ceased on 6 October 2013)
- TeamRock SID C0C1 (started on 1 May 2013, ceased on 1 July 2015)
- Premier Christian Radio (started on 21 September 2009, transferred to the Sound Digital multiplex on 29 February 2016)
- BFBS Radio – following an initial three-month trial service (replacing Core), which ended on 31 March 2008, test transmissions for a permanent service began on 17 April 2009 and the station officially launched as a full-time service on Digital One at 07:00 on 20 April 2009. The station was withdrawn from Digital One on 6 March 2017; broadcasts of BFBS services on other platforms continue.
- Heart Extra and Smooth Extra – these stations played automated music during the daytime, simulcasting the breakfast and evening/night programmes of Heart London and Smooth London respectively. Smooth Extra launched 27 December 2014, following the removal of Smooth Radio (2010) from Digital One (Smooth Christmas had used the slot in November/December), with Heart Extra following in February 2016 in tandem with the migration of several stations from Digital One to Sound Digital. Heart Extra and Smooth Extra converted from mono DAB to stereo DAB+ in 2019, and closed on 12 March 2020, replaced by the national Heart UK and Smooth UK feeds (already used on other national platforms such as TV) The Extra stations' broadcast slots on satellite TV had earlier been switched over to Heart 80s and Heart Dance respectively.

In addition to the audio services listed above a number of data services, short lived temporary audio services, and mobile video channels have been broadcast on this multiplex.

== Birdsong ==
Birdsong was a temporary transmission of a continuously looping recording of bird song.

When the magazine-format digital radio station Oneword ceased in January 2008, the birdsong audio returned to the multiplex on the Oneword channel and the service name of the DAB channel changed to "Birdsong", until Amazing Radio launched on 1 June 2009.

== See also ==
- BBC National DAB
- Sound Digital
