= Smooth Chill =

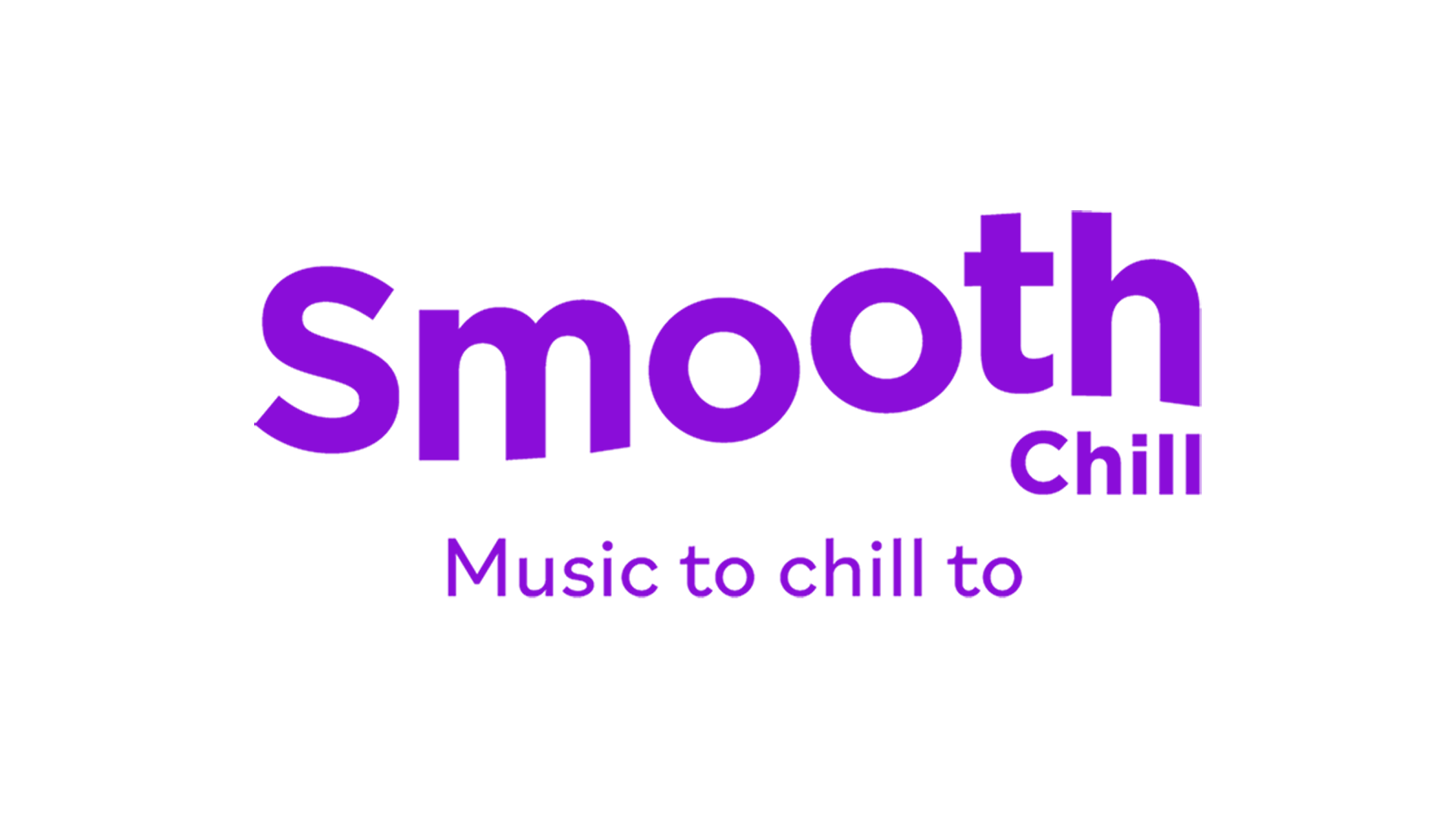
- United Kingdom
- Frequencies: DAB+: 11D (England, Wales and Northern Ireland and North and North East Ireland); DAB+: 12A (Scotland)

Programming
- Language: English
- Format: Ambient; Chill-out
- Network: Smooth Radio network

Ownership
- Owner: Global
- Sister stations: Smooth Radio; Smooth Country; Smooth Christmas

History
- Founded: 21 February 2005 as Chill
- First air date: 3 September 2019

Links
- Webcast: Global Player
- Website: www.smoothradio.com/chill/

Smooth Chill (formerly Chill) is a British digital radio station dedicated to chill out, ambient and trip hop music. On 3 September 2019, it was rebranded from Chill to the Smooth Radio brand. It is owned and operated by Global.

Originally, the station broadcast solely online and in Greater London as well as on Radioplayer and Global's own Global Player, but was made available nationally on Digital One on 9 April 2020.

As of September 2024, the station broadcasts to a weekly audience of 457,000 listeners, according to RAJAR.

== History ==
The station was launched officially on 21 February 2005, although it could be heard as early as December 2004 as a means of filling empty slots on DAB multiplexes owned by GWR prior to its merger with Capital Radio. Group Corporate Development Director Gregory Watson and Programme Director Bern Leckie devised a format for a relaxing, ambient station, aimed at 18 to 35 year olds.

On the station website, the founders claimed, "We used to make compilation tapes for ourselves and friends to chill out to. That's where the idea for our station came from, and we make it the same way we made the tapes – listening to lots of music, swapping ideas, seeing what happens."

In its early days, Chill featured no live shows or presenters, merely interspersing tracks with pre-recorded links featuring messages voiced by Davinia Palmer that reinforced the laidback atmosphere of the station. One of these memorably described the station as "T'ai chi for your ears".

The Chill playlist was largely drawn from the mainstream end of chill out and ambient music, mixed with downtempo rock, vocal jazz and lounge tracks, film scores and the occasional classical piece.

In June 2006, Chill bid for its first analogue licence, for Bristol, citing the city's record in producing trip-hop artists such as Massive Attack, Portishead and Tricky in support of its application. However, in September 2006, Ofcom awarded the licence to Canwest and its Original 106 format.

In August 2006, the station launched its first regular programmes on weekday evenings. Some of its regular shows over the years included:

- Simple City Acoustic music with Bern Leckie (Monday, 10pm)
- alucidnation presents Eclectronica with Bruce Bickerton (Saturday 10pm - Midnight, repeated Sunday 10pm - Midnight)
- The Deep End with Paul Noble (Wednesday, 10pm)
- The Garden of Delights with Pete Lawrence (organiser of The Big Chill festival) (Monday, 8pm)
- The Chiller Cabinet (Saturday and Sunday, 2am, repeated Tuesday and Thursday 10pm)
- Ben Mynotts's Fluidnation (Monday 7pm, repeated Friday 10pm & Sunday Noon-2pm)

Late in 2006, Chill upgraded from a 32 kbit/s internet stream to a 128 kbit/s stream, offering internet listeners the same quality as the cable and satellite viewers.

The station stopped being broadcast on Sky and Virgin Media on 3 July 2007, with other GCap stations Capital Disney, Core and Classic Gold Digital Network. It is speculated that this is connected with cost-cutting measures under previous owners GCap. In November 2008, Chill reappeared on Sky and Virgin Media, following the closure of jazz radio station TheJazz, using its old channel numbers on Sky and Virgin Media.

In March 2009, Chill ceased to broadcast in Leicester, Nottingham and west Wiltshire due to competition regulator compliance following the takeover of GCapMedia by Global Radio.

In July 2009, Global Radio announced that Chill would lose many of its DAB slots on numerous local DAB ensembles across the UK to allow for an expansion of the Galaxy network, but would still broadcast in London, some parts of the West Midlands and central Scotland. A spokesman indicated that this move was also financially led.

It was announced on 28 August 2009 that Chill Radio would be replaced in Edinburgh and Glasgow by LBC Radio.

On 20 October 2009, it was announced by Bern Leckie that Chill Radio has moved from stereo to mono output on DAB Radio in the London area. However the range in which Chill can be heard has slightly extended to an extra 20 miles or so from London.

Rajar figures for the third quarter of 2009 showed an increase of weekly listeners by 9,000, bringing total listenership to 209,000. In March 2012 it attracted 229,000 listeners per week.

On 15 July 2010, Chill ceased broadcasting on Virgin Media channel 961. On 8 June 2012, Chill ceased broadcasting on the Birmingham multiplex, leaving London as the only area where the station broadcasts on DAB Digital Radio. On 24 August 2012, Chill ceased broadcasting on Sky channel 0177.

In September 2014, TuneIn Radio announced that Chill Radio had received the 100k 'follower' mark, one of the most listened-to UK and worldwide stations, via its various apps and websites.

In September 2015, Global Radio confirmed that Chill would return to DAB in Nottingham and Leicester, replacing XFM. This is because XFM would be re-branding, and launching nationally on Digital One. Since its return to DAB in Nottingham and Leicester, Chill can also be heard on DAB in Derby.

Global announced on 2 September 2019 the station would be replaced with a new station, Smooth Chill.

The station relaunched nationally on 8 April 2020 on Digital One broadcasting in 32 kbit/s DAB+.

== DAB multiplexes ==
- Chill broadcast on DAB using the London 1, Leicester and Nottingham multiplexes.

=== Former multiplexes ===
Chill closed in March 2009 due to Office of Fair Trading ruling on the merger of GCap and Global Radio:

- Leicester
- Nottingham
- West Wiltshire

Chill closed from August 2009 on these multiplexes:

Replaced with Galaxy:

- NOW Bournemouth
- Bristol and Bath
- Cambridge
- Cardiff and Newport
- NOW Cornwall
- Exeter and Torbay
- Norwich
- NOW Peterborough
- NOW Plymouth
- Reading and Basingstoke
- Southend and Chelmsford
- NOW Sussex Coast
- NOW Kent

Taken off air:

- Coventry
- Wolverhampton, Shrewsbury and Telford

Replaced with LBC:

- Edinburgh
- Glasgow

Closed on the following multiplex in June 2012:

- Birmingham
