= Global Media & Entertainment =

British media company

Global Media & Entertainment Limited
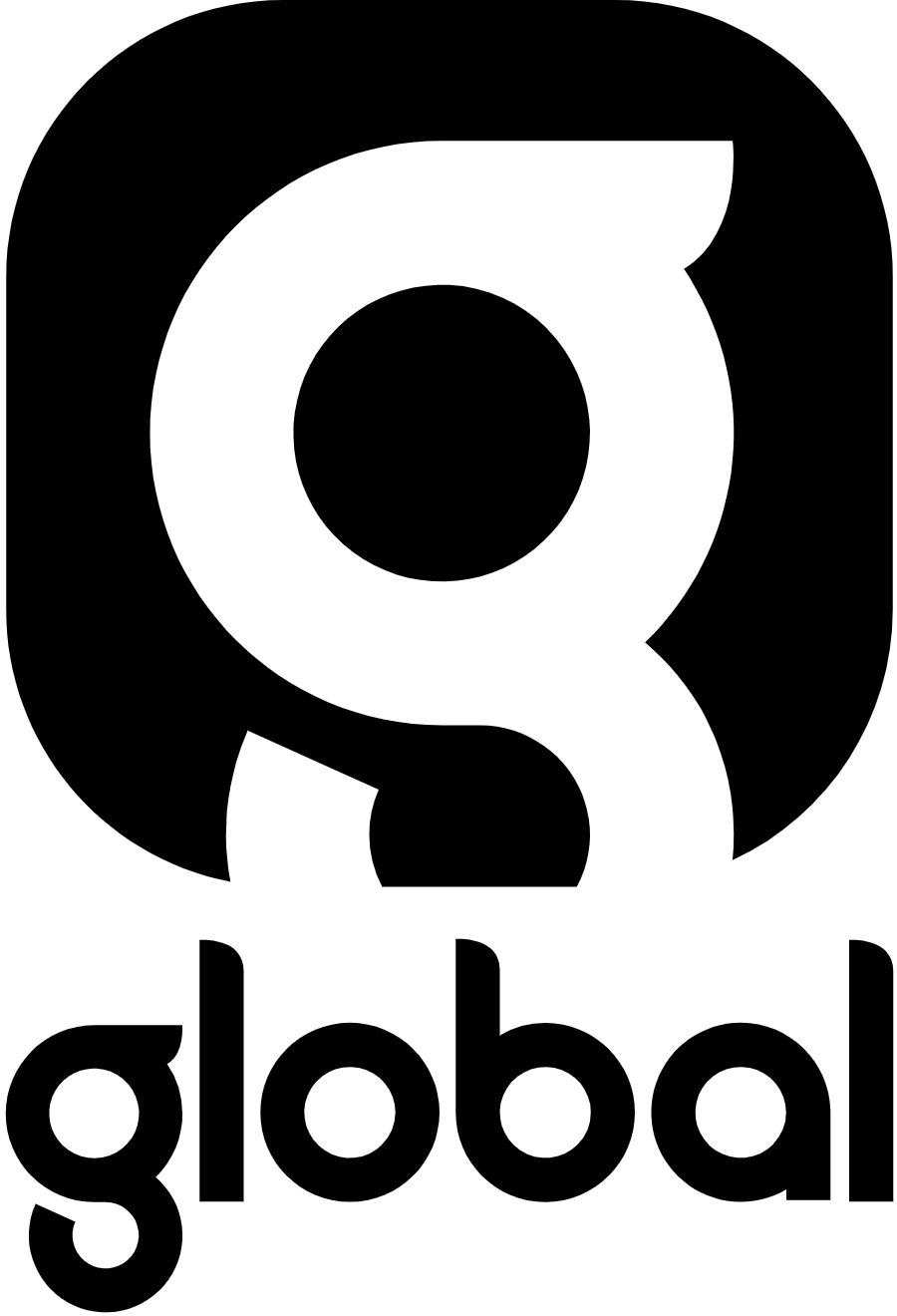
- Trade name: Global
- Type: Private
- Industry: Media
- Founded: 2007; 19 years ago
- Headquarters: London, England
- Area served: United Kingdom
- Key people: The Lord Allen of Kensington (Chairman); Ashley Tabor-King (Founder & Executive President)
- Revenue: ▲£824 million (March 2020)
- Operating income: ▲£59.5 million (March 2020)
- Net income: ▲£−202.9 million (March 2020)
- Total assets: ▲£1.781 billion (March 2020)
- Total equity: ▲£−555.45 million (March 2020)
- Owner: Ashley Tabor-King
- Website: www.global.com

Global Media & Entertainment Limited, trading as Global, is a British media company formed in 2007. It is the owner of the largest commercial radio company in Europe having expanded through a number of historical acquisitions, including Chrysalis Radio, GCap Media, and GMG Radio. Global owns and operates seven core radio brands, all employing a national network strategy, including Capital, Heart, Smooth, Radio X, Gold, Classic FM, and LBC.

Global is also one of the leading out-of-home advertising (OOH) companies in the UK.

== History ==
Global was founded by Ashley Tabor-King in 2007, with financial backing from his father Michael Tabor, and purchased Chrysalis Radio, taking control of the radio brands Heart, Galaxy, LBC, and The Arrow. A year later, on 31 October 2008, Global Radio officially took control of GCap Media and its brands. The GCap Media name was dropped at this time. The GCap purchase gave Global the network of FM stations which GCap had operated as The One Network (many of which are now part of the Heart or Capital networks), plus Classic FM, XFM (now Radio X), Choice FM, Gold, and Chill.

Following the acquisition of GCap Media, Global was required to sell off a number of stations in the Midlands. The stations were bought by Orion Media, headed by Phil Riley, former Chief Executive of Chrysalis Radio.

Heritage local radio stations in areas not already served by Heart FM were gradually rebranded and incorporated into a larger Heart Network that covers most of southern England and parts of North Wales – the stations which would become Heart in the North were acquired later. The remaining stations briefly formed The Hit Music Network before being merged with the Galaxy network and Capital London into the Capital network.

On 25 June 2012, Global acquired GMG Radio for a sum thought to be between £50 and £70 million; it continued to be run separately while a regulatory review was conducted. In May 2013, the Competition Commission ruled that Global would be required to sell seven stations across the network.

The company initially offered to dispose of three stations, Real XS in Manchester and Scotland, and Gold in the East Midlands, to try to prevent the sale of the seven stations mentioned in the ruling. When this failed, Global Radio launched an appeal against the decision.

The appeal was based on three grounds: (a) Real and Smooth as alternatives to the Greater Manchester stations, (b) reliance on "significant adverse effects" in the North-West (c) Global's remedy proposal (see above). The appeal was rejected on all grounds, requiring the company to sell the seven stations it was ordered to in the original judgement. Global said it was disappointed with the decision and was considering it further.

On 6 February 2014, it was announced that a number of stations would be sold to the Irish broadcaster Communicorp, with programming to be supplied by Global under contract. The deal involved control of Smooth Radio in the North East, the North West and the West Midlands, of Capital in South Wales and Scotland, of Real Radio in North Wales and Yorkshire, and of Real XS in Manchester. Most stayed under their previous brands, though the Real stations were renamed Heart and carried the Heart network off-peak programming as provided by Global. Global retained control of all other stations, relaunching the existing Heart North West and Wales as Capital to allow Real North Wales (under Communicorp) to take on the Heart affiliation. Real XS in Paisley was retained by Global and joined the XFM network; Real XS in Manchester is still a separate station owned by Communicorp as XS Manchester. Most of the Gold AM stations switched to taking the Smooth London/Network output; all but one no longer broadcasts on that platform.

It was announced in June 2015 that Darren Singer would be appointed as Global's chief financial officer.

In February 2017, Global changed its company name from 'This is Global Limited' to 'Global Media & Entertainment Limited'. It also changed all its social media handles from 'thisisglobal' to 'global' and its web domain to global.com. Global also combined the three sub-companies, Global Radio, Global Entertainment and Global Television into just 'Global'.

On 1 March 2018, Global launched a brand new awards show called The Global Awards celebrating the stars of music, news & entertainment across genres in the UK and from around the world. It took place at London's Eventim Apollo.

In September 2018, Global announced the acquisition of two outdoor advertising companies, Primesight and Outdoor Plus, creating Global's Outdoor Division. The acquisitions were reported to be worth £200 million.

On 19 September 2018, rival commercial radio group Bauer announced that they were pulling out of the biggest networked commercial radio chart show, The Official Vodafone Big Top 40, produced by Global's Capital. The move led to Global discontinuing the Sunday evening show for all stations outside of their own Heart and Capital networks, on which the show continues to air.

On 26 February 2019, Global Radio announced plans to replace the regional breakfast shows on Capital and Heart with a single national breakfast show for each network, whilst Smooth kept its regional breakfast shows, instead turning its drive time show national. Capital's new breakfast show launched in April with Roman Kemp, Heart Breakfast with Jamie Theakston and Amanda Holden launched in June, and Smooth Drivetime with Angie Grieves launched in September.

In September 2019, it was announced that Quidem, the owners of Banbury Sound, Rugby FM and Touch FM, had entered into a brand-licensing agreement with Global Radio. This change saw the Quidem stations rebrand under the Global brands. At the beginning of October, Ofcom opened a consultation following Quidem's request for its six stations to make significant changes to their formats.

On 20 December 2021, it was announced that Global has acquired the UK podcast hosting, distribution and monetisation startup, Captivate. Founders Mark Asquith and Kieran McKeefery subsequently joined the Global team in order to continue to grow Global's presence in the digital audio and podcasting space.

On 22 February 2022, Emily Maitlis and Jon Sopel announced they were joining Global to launch a new podcast. On 30 August 2022, The News Agents launched as a daily podcast presented by Emily Maitlis, Jon Sopel, and Lewis Goodall. Episodes are released every weekday afternoon. On 26 May 2023, it was announced that a weekly US version of the podcast would launch on 20 June. The News Agents USA is hosted by Maitlis and Sopel. On 29 September 2023, Global announced a further spin-off podcast, The News Agents Investigates, would launch on 1 October and be presented by Goodall.

In March 2024, Simon Pitts was appointed Group Chief Executive of Global Media. He started the role in early 2025.

In the first week of September 2024, Global announced that they would introduce an additional twelve radio stations, via a week long advertisement campaign on their social media pages. Additional spin-off stations of Heart, Capital, Radio X and Classic FM were introduced on the 12 September 2024. This brings the total number of stations operated by Global up to 33.

In October 2025, it was announced that Global had acquired The Fellas Studios, whilst simultaneously launching Global Studios.

In January 2026, it was announced that Global had acquired a majority stake in The Overlap, a sports media group founded by Gary Neville. The acquisition formed part of a partnership to develop a multi-format sports media network, with Global providing distribution, commercial, and operational support. In May, Global was announced as a sponsor of McLaren's Formula 1 and Hypercar teams.

== Radio stations ==
=== Capital ===
The Capital network consists of eleven contemporary hit stations which are broadcast in numerous areas of England, Wales and central Scotland, alongside a digital UK-wide version. On 3 January 2011, Capital London, The Hit Music Network, and the Galaxy network joined the Capital radio network; two former Heart stations became Capital in May 2014. Local news hours were extended as part of the agreement to increase programme-sharing, and advertising remains locally sold. Programming outside local hours is broadcast from Capital's network studios in Leicester Square, London. Unlike its competitor BBC Radio 1, Capital primarily plays dance-pop music and rarely plays rock or alternative music.

Capital runs two major multi-artist events each year, Capital's Summertime Ball and Capital's Jingle Bell Ball.

=== Capital Dance ===
Capital Dance is a national digital radio station, operating as a spin-off from the main Capital station. Like its sister stations, the station broadcasts from Leicester Square in London. The station predominantly plays contemporary electronic dance music.

=== Capital XTRA ===
Capital XTRA is an urban music station. Originally named Choice FM, it was acquired by Global in 2010; it was marketed as part of the Galaxy network, but retained its own separate branding and programming. On 7 October 2013, Choice FM was rebranded as Capital XTRA and made available nationally via DAB radio.

=== Capital Xtra Reloaded ===
Capital Xtra Reloaded is a digital radio station broadcasting from Birmingham. Its output consists primarily of hip-hop, dance, garage, R&B, and grime music from the 1990s, 2000s, and 2010s.

=== Heart ===
Heart is a contemporary radio station which currently broadcasts in numerous areas of England, Wales and central Scotland, alongside a digital UK-wide version. The network began with a single regional station in the West Midlands, followed by a second station in London. The third station, Heart 106 in the East Midlands (previously Century 106) was sold to Orion Media and run as a franchise; it retained the Heart name until the start of 2011, when it was rebranded as Gem 106. Heart stations in Hertfordshire, North Wales, and Yorkshire are owned by Communicorp and uses the Heart name and format under licence from Global. Heart South Devon was partly owned by UKRD Group; all other Heart stations are wholly Global-owned.

In 2009, many of the heritage CHR stations which had formed part of the One Network were renamed Heart, as were Ocean and South Hams Radio (which were not part of the One Network). Real Radio stations were rebranded as Heart on 6 May 2014.

Heart has eight sister stations: Heart 70s, Heart 80s, Heart 90s, Heart 00s, Heart 10s, Heart Dance, Heart Love, and Heart Musicals.

On 11 April 2023, it was announced that Heart Scotland would reintroduce local breakfast, daytime and weekend shows as part of an expansion of Global's Scottish radio operations. This saw drive time presenters Des Clarke and Jennifer Reoch move to the breakfast time slot. Sister station Capital Scotland (owned and operated under a brand licence by Communicorp) has also reintroduced local programming.

=== Classic FM ===
Classic FM is a classical music station broadcast nationally on FM and DAB, as well as on Freesat, Sky, Freeview and Virgin Media. It is one of three Independent National Radio franchises, and the only one to broadcast on FM.

On 3 January 2024, it was announced that Dan Walker was joining Classic FM to host its breakfast show.

=== Smooth ===
Acquired as part of the takeover of Real & Smooth Ltd, Smooth Radio broadcasts soft adult contemporary music on FM in six areas, and AM in a number of areas previously served by Gold. After taking over Smooth, Global reversed the "national" format that Smooth had taken in 2010, reintroducing local breakfast and drivetime shows. Two of the Smooth areas had previously been Jazz FM stations, and three had originally been Saga stations; the North East service launched as Smooth on a licence originally awarded to Saga.

=== LBC ===
LBC is a news and talk radio station, focusing on UK-wide and international news via phone-in discussion programmes. It launched on 8 October 1973 as the UK's first licensed commercial radio station, with Capital Radio launching a week later on 16 October. LBC broadcasts nationally on DAB, television, and Global Player, as well as FM in London.

=== LBC News ===
LBC News is a 24-hour rolling news station. Its news presenters include Lisa Aziz and Martin Stanford, whilst John Kettley is one of the weather presenters.

=== Radio X ===
Radio X (formerly XFM) broadcasts alternative rock and independent music. Founded in 1997 as an independent London station, it was purchased by Capital Radio Group (now Global) in 1998. Radio X is available nationally on DAB+ digital radio, Global Player, Virgin TV, and Sky, as well as FM in London and Manchester.

=== Gold Radio ===
Gold is a national DAB station mostly playing music from the 1950s to the 1980s, which grew out of a network of AM and later DAB stations. Many of these were the AM sister stations to heritage CHR stations which are now Heart or Capital stations, though Gold Manchester was originally a standalone station Fortune 1458 and Lite AM before becoming part of the Big-AM and later Capital Gold networks. In the West Midlands, after the divestiture of some radio holdings to Orion Media, the Gold brand continued as a franchise, however, in late 2012 these stations were rebranded as Free Radio 80s and no longer carried Gold network programming.

Most Gold stations on AM/local DAB transferred to receive their network programming provision from Smooth Radio on 24 March 2014; local news, travel and advertising drop-ins into the network programming feed continue as previously provided under Gold, and the former Gold stations in Wales continue to offer a four-hour local show as Smooth Wales. Three Gold areas where Smooth is already provided on FM – London, Manchester and the East Midlands – retained a reduced Gold service on AM and (bar Manchester, where capacity is unavailable) local DAB, with most presented shows (aside from a daily morning show) ceasing. However these were subsequently switched off as part of Global's decision to withdraw from AM broadcasting - the last to go being Greater Manchester at the end of April 2024.

A number of areas gained or regained Gold as a DAB service in September 2015 in space vacated by XFM, following XFM's move from local to national transmission as Radio X. This was then in turn superseded by the transmission of Gold nationally over Digital One in the DAB+ format from 2019, with most of the prior Gold capacity outside London reallocated to Smooth Country. With the closure of Gold's last AM transmission in 2024, Gold Radio - as the station was officially rebranded that year - is now a digital-only offering.

=== Streaming-only stations ===
Global currently operates the following stations exclusively broadcast via web-based platforms:

==== Smooth Extra ====
Smooth Extra launched at the end of 2014 to broadcast nationally on Digital One (in the slot previously occupied by the network Smooth Radio service) with a 'melodic music from past decades' format (some programming is simulcast with Smooth London). A previous plan to launch a service of "music from the 70s, 80s and 90s" in the Digital One capacity ultimately did not go ahead. Smooth added two further digital siblings on 3 September 2019; Smooth Country (previously a Global Player stream) and Smooth Chill, the successor to Chill.

A pop-up digital Christmas music station, Smooth Christmas, was operated by R&S in the run-up to Christmas of 2011 and 2012, and having not run in 2013 was revived by Global in 2014 but was in 2015. In 2016, Smooth Christmas was not revived, instead Heart Extra Xmas, a pop-up digital Christmas music station, appeared from 12 November 2016 until 27 December 2016. It returned on 9 November 2017.

==== Heart brand ====
Heart 80s launched in March 2017; the conversion of these stations to DAB+ in 2019 permitted the launch of further stations including Heart Dance, Heart 70s, Heart 90s, followed by Heart 00s in 2022 and Heart 10s, Heart Musicals & Heart Love in 2024 as part of Global's network expansion on 12th September.

==== Capital Buzz ====
Capital Buzz is a cultural platform of interviews, articles, podcast, videos, and GIFs, combined with a music stream of the fastest trending tracks in social media with digital goodness from around the web. Founded in 2014, the brand is targeted to millennials and Gen Zs.

== Events ==
Global produce over 150 events for its radio brands annually. These include Capital's Summertime Ball and Jingle Bell Ball, Heart Live and Classic FM Live at the Royal Albert Hall. It also produces its own Global Awards, which recognizes the most popular songs across its radio stations.

In March 2018, Global launched a new awards show (The Global Awards) celebrating the stars of music, news and entertainment across genres in the UK and from around the world.

== Global Academy ==
The Global Academy UTC opened on 12 September 2016 and is sponsored by Global and University of the Arts London. It is located on the site of the Old Vinyl Factory in Hayes, Hillingdon.

On 20 January 2017, The Global Academy was officially opened by the Duke of Cambridge and Prince Harry. Two Breakfast shows from the Global brands were broadcasting Live from the academy, Heart London Breakfast with Jamie Theakston and Emma Bunton and Nick Ferrari on LBC.

== Global's Newsroom ==
All of Global's stations broadcast news updates under the name Global's Newsroom. Local and national bulletins are produced and Global's Newsroom also provides the news to Global's news station LBC. In terms of weekly audience reach, Global's Newsroom is the second largest news broadcaster in the UK, second only to the BBC.

== The Global Awards ==
The Global Awards which started on 1 March 2018 are held by Global and reward music played on its own stations. The Global Awards returned in 2019.

=== List of ceremonies ===
Year	Date	Venue	Broadcast	Hosts		
2018	1 March 2018	Hammersmith Apollo	Capital; Capital TV; Heart TV	Roman Kemp	Rochelle Humes	Kate Garraway
2019	7 March 2019	Hammersmith Apollo	Capital; Heart	Roman Kemp	Rochelle Humes	Kate Garraway

== Charity ==
Global's Make Some Noise is Global's in-house charity.

Every year Global's Make Some Noise has an annual appeal day where its radio stations come together to raise money for small projects supporting youngsters and their families living with illness, disability or lack of opportunity, in their local communities.

Before Global's Make Some Noise, some of Global's stations ran their own charities, such as Help a Capital Child, Have a Heart and the Classic FM Foundation.

In 1975, Capital FM's charity Help a London Child was established by the late Sir Richard Attenborough, to help disadvantaged young people in the capital. He once said: "Disadvantaged children don't have less imagination, just less opportunity to express it."

In 2014, Global's Make Some Noise was formed. 9 October it was Make Some Noise day, where all of Global's brands came together. Make Some Noise raised more than 1 million pounds.

In 2015, Global's Make Some Noise ran its second year on 8 October they came all came together. They raised £1,955,869.

In 2016, Global's Make Some Noise returned on 7 October. In total £2,860,897 was raised. In the financial year 2016-2017 £0.98M was spent by Global Charities on fund raising.

In 2017, Global's Make Some Noise returned on 6 October and raised a record breaking £3,534,628.

== Criticism ==
In February 2009, Global and LBC were the subject of criticism by technical and scientific bloggers following their threat of legal action against medical journalist Ben Goldacre for publishing part of an LBC 97.3 broadcast by Jeni Barnett on his website. The move was interpreted as an attempt to suppress criticism and debate rather than enforcement of copyright. The broadcast itself was described as irresponsible by David Aaronovitch in The Times, and LBC and Barnett were specifically identified in a critical Early Day Motion by Norman Lamb MP.

In May 2015, Global was criticised for dropping coverage of the Swiss Leaks story in February that year. Coverage of the story was resumed "some days later".

In July 2020, Global was criticised for failing to investigate multiple online allegations that Capital Xtra DJ Tim Westwood had behaved inappropriately with young female fans.

Corporate Watch has criticised Global's use of shareholder loans to avoid tax.

== See also ==
- Timeline of Global Radio
