= Heart 70s =

British radio station

United Kingdom
- Broadcast area: United Kingdom
- Frequency: DAB+: Digital One

Programming
- Language: English
- Format: 1970s music
- Network: Heart

Ownership
- Owner: Global
- Sister stations: Heart 80s; Heart 90s; Heart 00s; Heart 10s; Heart Dance; Heart Love; Heart Musicals; Heart UK; Heart Xmas

History
- First air date: 30 August 2019

Links
- Webcast: Heart 70s on Global Player
- Website: Heart 70s

Heart 70s is a national digital radio station owned and operated by Global as a spin-off from Heart. The station broadcasts from studios at Leicester Square in London.

Launched on 30 August 2019, Heart 70s is a rolling music service playing non-stop “feel good” music from the 1970s. It has its own dedicated live breakfast show, hosted by Carlos, 6–10 am on weekdays. At other times, the station is mostly an automated service. On 8 January 2021, Heart 70s announced that Carlos would host a Saturday Show from 8am–12noon with the first programme being on 9 January 2021.

== See also ==
- 1970s nostalgia
