= 2017 in British radio =

This is a list of events in British radio during 2017.

== Events ==
=== January ===
- 3 January –
  - Bauer Radio's Cash for Kids appeal raises £15.5 million for charity.
  - Former Free Radio presenter Gemma Hill joins Ed James as co-presenter of Heart Breakfast at Heart West Midlands, replacing Rachel New, who left the station in December 2016.
- 5 January –
  - LBC hires former UK Independence Party leader Nigel Farage to present an hour-long weeknight show for the station starting from 9 January.
  - Smooth North East attracts some media attention after a social media post meant for a personal account is mistakenly posted to its official Twitter page.
- 6 January – Bed retailer Dreams signs a long-term sponsorship deal with the Heart network to air features offering listeners advice on how to maximise their sleep. and Tony Blackburn's The Golden Hour broadcasts for the first time, after Blackburn's return to BBC Radio 2 from New Year's Eve 2016.
- 7 January – BBC Radio 4 broadcasts six comedy pilots.
- 8 January – Simon Bates confirms he has left BBC Radio Devon after presenting their breakfast show for two years.
- 9 January – BBC Radio 2 announces changes to its overnight schedule from the end of January. The After Midnight programme, presented by Janice Long and Alex Lester will be axed in favour of repeats of shows such as Sounds of the 60s and Pick of the Pops, while an automated service titled Radio 2 Playlists will air in the 2 am – 5 am slot.
- 12 January – Talkradio announces the launch of its own version of Woman's Hour–Badass Women's Hour–which will air on Saturday evenings at 8pm from 14 January.
- 13 January – Channel 5 weather presenter Sian Welby will join Heart to present the weekday evening show from 16 January. A number of other presenters are also subsequently announced, all of whom will be part of Heart's Feel Good Weekend; Annaliese Dayes will present Club Classics, while Anna Johnson and James Stewart will present shows on Sundays.
- 17 January – Cross Counties Radio announce plans to launch an online radio station for the 9,000 workers based at the Magna Park distribution centre in Lutterworth, Leicestershire.
- 18 January – Absolute Radio presenters Geoff Lloyd and Annabel Port announce their departure from the station.
- 19 January – The Armed Forces radio station BFBS announces it will cease broadcasting on the Digital One platform from March because of the cost of transmitting content through DAB.
- 21 January –
  - The BBC launches an investigation after a Twitter account belonging to BBC Northampton was hacked, and a fake news story posted claiming that US President Donald Trump had been shot.
  - Dermot O'Leary presents his final Saturday afternoon show for BBC Radio 2, having hosted the programme for twelve years.
- 28–30 January – Absolute Radio 90s is temporarily renamed Absolute Radio Frank to celebrate the 60th birthday of its presenter Frank Skinner.
- 29 January – Former England captain David Beckham is the castaway on the 75th anniversary edition of BBC Radio 4's Desert Island Discs.
- 30 January – London Evening Standard editor Sarah Sands is appointed editor of Radio 4's Today programme, replacing Jamie Angus; Sands becomes the second woman to take the role after Jenny Abramsky was appointed to the position in 1986.
- 31 January – Celador Radio buys Anglian Radio, and adds five stations in the East of England to its portfolio.

=== February ===
- 1 February – Clare Teal presents Desmond Carrington – All Time Great, a special Radio 2 show celebrating the music played by Desmond Carrington during his time with the network. The programme airs on the day that Carrington's death is announced.
- 25 February – Brian Matthew presents his final edition of Sounds of the 60s for Radio 2, having taken the decision to retire from the weekly show because of ill health.

=== March ===
- 4 March – Tony Blackburn succeeds Brian Matthew as presenter of Radio 2's Sounds of the 60s. The two-hour show also moves to the earlier time of 6 am.
- 29 March –
  - BBC Radio 4 broadcasts the magazine programme Midweek, presented by Libby Purves, for the last time after 30 years.
  - UKRD Group announces that it is to hand back the licenses which are used to provide Star Radio North East to Ofcom, apart from the Northallerton licence which it proposes to transfer back to Minster FM. Ofcom Confirmed the transfer of the Northallerton licence to Minster on 4 April 2017.
- 31 March – Star Radio is reprieved when UKRD announces that it has sold the station to View TV Group.

=== April ===
- 10 April – BBC Radio 4 controller Gwyneth Williams announces that the arts programme Saturday Review will be axed in the autumn as part of cost-cutting measures; instead Front Row will get a Saturday highlights edition.
- 22 April – BBC Radio 4 broadcasts the play Keeping in Touch written in 1978 by Joan Bakewell as a response to Harold Pinter's play Betrayal which was based on Pinter's clandestine extramarital affair with Bakewell.
- 28 April – BBC Media editor Amol Rajan will succeed Steve Hewlett as presenter of Radio 4's The Media Show following Hewlett's death in February.

=== May ===
- May – Talksport secures exclusive national radio commentary rights to the English Football League. It gives them the ability to broadcast up to up 110 EFL fixtures a season for three years until the end of the 2019/2020 season.
- 22 May – A light-hearted quiz concerning Moors murderer Ian Brady which appeared on Nathan Turvey's BBC Radio Leeds breakfast show the previous day is described by the BBC as "unacceptable".
- 26 May – London-based LBC announces that Katie Hopkins, who had presented a Sunday morning programme since April 2016, will leave the station immediately following a post she made on Twitter in the aftermath of the Manchester Arena bombing in which she talked of the need for a "final solution".

=== June ===
- 9 June –
  - Following a three-week trial at Warwick Crown Court, former BBC radio presenters Tony and Julie Wadsworth are convicted of indecently assaulting under-age boys during the 1990s, and each jailed for five years.
  - Gary Davies joins BBC Radio 2, and returning to BBC Radio after 23 years away.
- 14 June – BBC Radio 4 announces that Malawian comedian and Britain's Got Talent finalist Daliso Chaponda will have his own show on the network, titled Daliso Chaponda: Citizen of Nowhere.
- 19 June – Launch of Brexitcast, a BBC podcast looking at Brexit-related issues. It is also aired by BBC Radio 5 Live.

=== July ===
- 5 July – Jazz FM confirms its presenter Peter Young, known as PY to listeners, has stepped down from his presenting role after 27 years at the station due to ill health. The station also announces a new schedule beginning on 8 July, which will see three new presenters–Tony Minvielle, Tim Garcia and Anne Frankenstein–join its weekend lineup.
- 24 July – The BBC announces a new music festival for 2018, which it is hoped will fill the gap left by Glastonbury, which is taking a year off. The Biggest Weekend will run from 25 to 28 May, and take place at four venues, one in each of the Home Countries. Coverage will be shown on BBC radio and television.
- 27 July – The BBC reverses its decision to axe the Radio 4 arts programme Saturday Review.

=== August ===
- 1 August – Star Radio North East is rebranded as Rathergood Radio.
- 10 August – Radio 4 defends its decision to include an interview with Nigel Lawson in a segment of The Today Programme about climate change after the Green Party accused the former Chancellor of making "false claims" on the topic. Radio 4 says it has a duty to represent all sides of the climate change debate.
- 13–14 August – Pirate BBC Essex broadcasts for the fourth and presumably final time to commemorate the 50th anniversary of the passing of the Marine Broadcasting Offences Act 1967.
- 17 August – Radio 4 announces it has commissioned a pilot of Where's The F In News, a topical radio panel show whose guests will mostly be women. The programme will be written and presented by Jo Bunting, producer of Have I Got News for You.
- 18 August – Four new presenters—Abbie McCarthy, Katie Thistleton, Jordan North and Yasser—will make their debut on BBC Radio 1, standing in on Matt Edmondson's weekend show throughout September while he is away filming for television.
- 30 August – BBC Radio 3 announces plans to broadcast a one-off, six-hour programme featuring the voices of people living with dementia, which will air overnight on 15 October.

=== September ===
- 1 September – The Bauer City 3 network is disbanded, and The Hits as a single national service returns to DAB in its place.
- 9 September – The concert held to reopen Manchester Arena following June's bombing is broadcast live on BBC Radio Manchester, Key 103 and Radio X.
- 18 September – The fourth roll-out of new transmitters of the BBC National DAB multiplex is completed. The programme, which had run for the past two years, increased the reach from 93% to more than 97% of the UK's population and saw the switching on of 164 new transmitters.
- 26 September – A poll of Radio Times readers names Sir Terry Wogan the greatest broadcaster of the last 50 years.
- 30 September – 50th anniversary of the launch of BBC Radio 1 and BBC Radio 2, which began broadcasting on 30 September 1967. To celebrate the occasion, the two stations air a joint 90-minute show presented by Nick Grimshaw and Tony Blackburn, while Radio 1 launches a special pop up vintage station featuring 50 hours of programming from their archives.

=== October ===
- 1 October – Smooth Radio hires former Magic presenter Gary Vincent to present its evening programme. He succeeds Chris Skinner from 2 October.
- 6 October – Prince Harry has been invited to guest edit an edition of The Today Programme, its editor, Sarah Sands confirms. The Prince is one of several guest editors lined up to edit the programme over the Christmas 2017 period.
- 12 October – BBC Radio 4 confirms that The Hitchhiker's Guide to the Galaxy is to return for a new series, with the original cast reuniting to record a dramatisation of Eoin Colfer's And Another Thing..., a continuation novel commissioned by the Estate of Douglas Adams.
- 22 October – Reality television starlet Gemma Collins suffers a near fatal fall after plunging through a trapdoor while presenting an award at the Radio 1 Teen Awards, held at Wembley Stadium.
- 23 October – Julia Hartley-Brewer, a presenter on talkRADIO, faces criticism after posting a joke on Twitter about an armed siege. Hartley-Brewer posted about the siege at a bowling alley in Nuneaton, Warwickshire on 22 October, saying that she would "take hostages too" if she was stuck at the venue on a Sunday evening.
- 26 October – Figures indicate that the Radio 1 Breakfast Show with Nick Grimshaw recorded its lowest listener audience in the third quarter of 2017, with 4.93 million weekly listeners between July and September, compared to 5.5 million in the previous quarter.

=== November ===
- 9 November – BBC Director General Tony Hall says the BBC will not go ahead with a planned £10million in cuts to local radio.
- 19 November – It is reported that BBC Radio Wales presenter Aled Jones has voluntarily agreed not to appear on the BBC while the broadcaster holds an investigation into allegations he sent inappropriate messages to a woman more than a decade ago, it is reported. Jones apologises for any upset caused by his behaviour, which he says can be "occasionally juvenile". In January 2018, the BBC confirms the presenter, last heard on air in October, will return to his presenting roles.
- 20 November – Global announces that it has purchased Cumbrian stations The Bay and Lakeland Radio from CN Group.
- 23 November – Guest presenters of BBC Radio 4's Today programme over the Christmas period will include Henry, Prince of Wales and a robot, it is confirmed.
- 26 November – Clare Balding steps down as presenter of BBC Radio 2's Good Morning Sunday, with the day's edition being her final programme. Angie Greaves will assume the presenting role in the short term.

=== December ===
- 18 December – Ofcom launches an investigation into impartiality over two appearances by climate change denier Nigel Lawson on BBC Radio 4's Today programme, the first major Ofcom investigation into the BBC since taking over responsibility for regulation of the BBC earlier in the year. The investigation concerns appearances made by Lawson on the programme in 2014, and August 2017.
- 20 December –
  - BBC Radio 2 announces plans to extend its religion-themed magazine programme Good Morning Sunday to three hours, while the long-running The Sunday Hour will end after more than seven decades. The new programme, which begins on 4 February 2018, will air from 6.00am to 9.00am, and be presented by Kate Bottley and Jason Mohammad.
  - Global Radio announce details of the voting categories for its inaugural awards ceremony, the Global Awards to be held at London's Hammersmith Eventim Apollo on 1 March 2018. The Awards will be reflective of the music, programmes and news aired on its network of stations.
- 22 December – The former pirate station Radio Caroline begins broadcasting on 648kHz medium wave, having been granted a licence to do so by Ofcom. The frequency was formerly used by the BBC World Service.
- 27 December – Prince Harry guest edits the Today programme, on which is included guest interviews with former US President Barack Obama and Prince Charles.

== Station debuts ==
- 14 March – Heart 80s
- 26 April – Fix Radio
- RG2 Radio (Reading, Berkshire)

== Programme debuts ==
- 7 January – Alone on BBC Radio 4 (2017 (pilot)–Present)
- 9 January – The Nigel Farage Show on LBC (2017–2020)
- 20 March – Alex Lester at Breakfast on BBC Radio WM (2017–2019)
- 19 June – Brexitcast on BBC Radio 5 Live (2017–2020)
- 17 November – The Wilsons Save the World on BBC Radio 4 (2017–2020)
- 18 December – Holmes and Watford on BBC Radio 4 (2017–2018)

== Continuing radio programmes ==
=== 1940s ===
- The Sunday Hour (1940–2018)
- Desert Island Discs (1942–Present)
- Woman's Hour (1946–Present)
- A Book at Bedtime (1949–Present)

=== 1950s ===
- The Archers (1950–Present)
- The Today Programme (1957–Present)

=== 1960s ===
- Farming Today (1960–Present)
- In Touch (1961–Present)
- The World at One (1965–Present)
- The Official Chart (1967–Present)
- Just a Minute (1967–Present)
- The Living World (1968–Present)
- The Organist Entertains (1969–2018)

=== 1970s ===
- PM (1970–Present)
- Start the Week (1970–Present)
- You and Yours (1970–Present)
- I'm Sorry I Haven't a Clue (1972–Present)
- Good Morning Scotland (1973–Present)
- Newsbeat (1973–Present)
- File on 4 (1977–Present)
- Money Box (1977–Present)
- The News Quiz (1977–Present)
- Feedback (1979–Present)
- The Food Programme (1979–Present)
- Science in Action (1979–Present)

=== 1980s ===
- Steve Wright in the Afternoon (1981–1993, 1999–2022)
- In Business (1983–Present)
- Sounds of the 60s (1983–Present)
- Loose Ends (1986–Present)

=== 1990s ===
- The Moral Maze (1990–Present)
- Essential Selection (1991–Present)
- Essential Mix (1993–Present)
- Up All Night (1994–Present)
- Wake Up to Money (1994–Present)
- Private Passions (1995–Present)
- In Our Time (1998–Present)
- Material World (1998–Present)
- Scott Mills (1998–2022)
- The Now Show (1998–Present)

=== 2000s ===
- BBC Radio 2 Folk Awards (2000–Present)
- Big John @ Breakfast (2000–Present)
- Sounds of the 70s (2000–2008, 2009–Present)
- Dead Ringers (2000–2007, 2014–Present)
- Kermode and Mayo's Film Review (2001–2022)
- A Kist o Wurds (2002–Present)
- Fighting Talk (2003–Present)
- Jeremy Vine (2003–Present)
- The Chris Moyles Show (2004–2012, 2015–Present)
- Annie Mac (2004–2021)
- Elaine Paige on Sunday (2004–Present)
- The Bottom Line (2006–Present)
- The Christian O'Connell Breakfast Show (2006–Present)
- The Unbelievable Truth (2006–Present)
- Radcliffe & Maconie (2007–Present)
- The Media Show (2008–Present)
- Johnnie Walker's Sounds of the 70s (2009–Present)
- Newsjack (2009–Present)
- Paul O'Grady on the Wireless (2009–2022)
- Alan and Mel's Summer Escape (2009–2020)

=== 2010s ===
- The Chris Evans Breakfast Show (2010–2018)
- Graham Norton (2010–2020)
- Simon Mayo Drivetime (2010–2018)
- The Third Degree (2011–Present)
- BBC Radio 1's Dance Anthems (2012–Present)
- Late Night Graham Torrington (2012–2020)
- The Radio 1 Breakfast Show with Nick Grimshaw (2012–Present)
- Sounds of the 80s (2013–Present)
- Question Time Extra Time (2013–Present)
- The Show What You Wrote (2013–Present)
- Friday Sports Panel (2014–Present)
- Home Front (2014–Present)
- Stumped (2015–Present)
- 50 Things That Made the Modern Economy (2016–Present)

== Ending this year ==
- 9 January – After Midnight
- 21 January – The Dermot O'Leary Show (2005–2017)
- 12 April – Geoff Lloyd with Annabel Port (2008–2017)
- 28 October – 50 Things That Made the Modern Economy (2016–2017)

== Deaths ==
- 1 February – Desmond Carrington, 90, broadcaster (BBC Radio 2, BBC Light Programme) (Alzheimer's disease)
- 4 February – Howard Philpott, 63, newsreader (BBC Radio 4) (cancer)
- 13 February – Sara Coward, 69, actress (The Archers) (breast cancer)
- 20 February
  - Steve Hewlett, 58, journalist (The Media Show, BBC Radio 4) (esophageal cancer)
  - Stephen Rhodes, 66, broadcaster (BRMB, Beacon Radio, BBC Radio Shropshire, BBC Three Counties Radio) (motor neurone disease)
- 8 April – Brian Matthew, 88 radio presenter (BBC Radio 2 Sounds of the 60s, BBC Light Programme) (pneumonia)
- 5 July – Paul Hollingdale, 79, radio broadcaster (BBC Radio 2, BBC Light Programme)
- 1 September – Ralph Dellor, 69, cricket commentator
- 28 September – Alan Thompson, 54, Welsh radio broadcaster (BBC Radio Wales) (pneumonia)
