= Central Radio (Lancashire) =

British Independent Local Radio serving parts of Lancashire

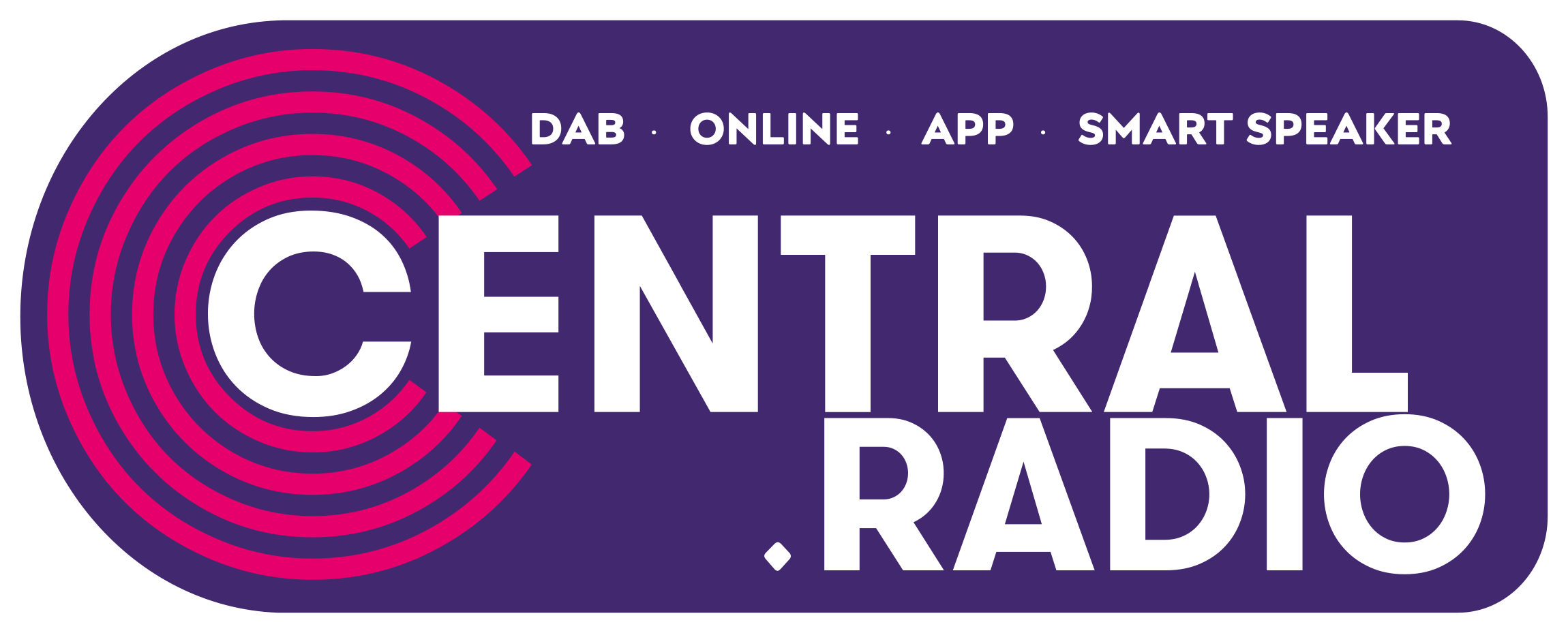
- Preston, Lancashire; England
- Broadcast area: Blackpool, The Fylde, Preston, Chorley, Leyland, Blackburn, Accrington and Burnley
- Frequency: DAB

Programming
- Language: English
- Format: talk radio, music radio

History
- First air date: September 25, 2008

Technical information
- Transmitter coordinates: 53.64637°N 3.017229°W

Links
- Website: www.central.radio

Central Radio is a British Independent Local Radio serving Blackpool, The Fylde, Preston, Leyland, Chorley, Blackburn and Burnley areas of Lancashire which covers approximately 981,000 adults.

The station launched on 25 September 2008, having changed its name prior to launch from Proud FM, derived from Proud Preston on the city shield to Central Radio in order to better reflect the transmission area.

== Ownership history ==
=== UTV ===
Central Radio launched on 25 September 2008. Following Ofcom relaxations on local programming requirements, the station began taking UTV Radio's networked evening and overnight shows in late March 2009.

On 16 December 2009, it was announced by owners UTV Media that the station would be closing on Christmas Eve of that year (24 December) and the station's broadcasting licence returned to the UK broadcasting regulator, Ofcom. UTV cited the unfortunate launch of the station in the midst of a recession as a primary reason for the decision, and the station's consequent unprofitability. UTV did not anticipate the station becoming viable for the foreseeable future, saying:

"We won the licence against strong competition, but unfortunately had to launch the station in the middle of the worst recession in memory. We have been looking closely at the station's viability and unfortunately given the economic climate we have taken the difficult decision to close the station."

=== Niocom ===
On 24 December 2009, the day that Central Radio was scheduled to close, it was announced that a buyer had been found, revealed to be competitor Niocom in January 2010. The company also operated the neighbouring Southport station Dune FM at the time of the sale. On 12 January 2010, the station co-emplaced and began to share resources with sister station Dune FM.

A month later, OFCOM granted permission for Central Radio to co-locate with sister station Dune FM in Southport. Programme management, production, administrative, engineering and management resources were to be shared between the two stations, but the programming on Central Radio remained editorially focused on the Preston, Leyland and Chorley areas.

In December 2010, Niocom sold Dune FM, and from 1 February 2011 the programming syndication ended with Central Radio becoming as a fully independent service.

=== UKRD ===
On 14 June 2011 it was announced that UKRD, owners of the 107 The Bee in neighbouring Blackburn had purchased the Central Radio licence and planned to merge the service with its East Lancashire station 107 The Bee.

Three days later, Central Radio ceased broadcasting with Drivetime presenter - Leyland born Andy Hilbert - playing the final record, Unforgettable by Nat King Cole. On 1 July 2011, 106.5fm became a simulcast of The Bee but with local news and adverts.

=== Relaunch in 2022 ===
On 1 September 2022, Central Radio relaunched across the Fylde Coast broadcasting from the new Blackpool MUX at the top of Blackpool Tower. The station launched with a number of familiar former local radio presenters.

For the launch, the radio station offered a holiday to Las Vegas as a prize.

=== Extension into Central Lancashire - September 2023 ===
Exactly 12 months after the initial launch of Central Radio in Blackpool, on 1 September 2023, the station expanded by joining the new Preston & Chorley DAB multiplex which added a further 370,000 adults into the broadcast area.

=== Extension into East Lancashire - October 2023 ===
In October 2023, the station expanded further into East Lancashire and commenced broadcasting from three new DAB transmitters, located in Blackburn (at the top of Royal Blackburn hospital), Burnley (located at Spen Height) and Accrington (at Accrington Academy) - this extension added a further 430,000 adults into the broadcast area.

=== Extension into North Lancashire - August 2024 ===
From 1 August 2024, Central Radio absorbed Morecambe-based online station Triple M Radio from founder Tony Simon, with Triple M effectively closed and listeners directed to stream Central in its stead, effectively enlarging Central's target area to include north Lancashire (though the station's FM and digital coverage was unchanged).

== Current Presenters ==
- Danny Matthews (formerly at Heart North Lancashire & Cumbria)
- Dave Salmon (formerly at Radio Wave)
- Chris Kirk (formerly at Heart North Lancashire & Cumbria)
- Dom Molloy (formerly at The Revolution 96.2)
- Mark Walker (formerly at Smooth Lake District)
- Steve Crumley (formerly at Wish FM & Tower FM)
- Martin Emery (formerly at Radio Wave)
- James Macdonald
- Ian Davies
- Nathan Hill (presenter and owner)

== Past presenters ==
- Aaron Roscoe (now at Signal 1)
- Aidan Bracken (now at Dune FM)
- Andy Hilbert (now at 107 The Bee)
- Anna Woolhouse (now at Lincs FM)
- Brendan Kearney (now at 96.2 The Revolution)
- Brent Williams (now at Dune FM)
- Chris Buckley (now at Signal 1)
- Dave Asher (now at Peak FM)
- Dave Turley (now at Dune FM)
- David Duffy (now at Lincs FM)
- John Cooper (now at Rother FM)
- Jon Holling (now at Tower FM)
- Kim Shaw (now at Heart)
- Mark Blackman (now at Silk 106.9)
- Mark Keen (now at Radio Wave 96.5)
- Neil Jackson (now at Dune FM)
- Olly Houldsworth (now at 107 The Bee)
- Paul Harvey (now at Peak FM)
- Paul Jordan (now at Hallam FM)
- Paul Tasker (now at Dune FM)
- Phil Johnson (now at RadioWave 96.5)
- Phil King (now at Mighty Radio)
- Scott Wright (now at 107 The Bee)
- Steve Bradshaw (now at Radio Wave 96.5)

== See also ==
- List of radio stations in the United Kingdom
