= The Local Radio Company =

British media company

- Type: Subsidiary
- Industry: Broadcasting
- Founded: 1996; 30 years ago
- Defunct: 2010
- Headquarters: Redruth, UK
- Products: Local Radio

The Local Radio Company was a British media company, based in Redruth, Cornwall, that owned eleven Independent Local Radio stations in the UK. After takeover talks with UTV Media, UKRD Group and Hallwood Financial, UKRD acquired the majority share of the company in June 2009.

== History ==
TLRC was formed in 1996 as a joint venture between its majority shareholder Radio Investments Limited and GWR Group plc, with founding Chief Executive Chris Carnegy also holding a small stake. It was designed as a specialist operator of small stations and its initial portfolio consisted of stations transferred from the founders: Spire FM, Gold Radio, KCBC and Boss 603 Cheltenham from RIL, and Isle of Wight Radio from GWR. The group expanded rapidly by acquisitions and new licence wins.

Changes in structure saw a merger between TLRC, RIL and RIL subsidiary Radio Services. At its peak the merged private company owned or invested in 28 stations, spread between Stirling in Scotland and the Isle of Wight, and between Lowestoft and Plymouth. From 2000, the Guardian Media Group held a management contract, with its radio chief John Myers taking charge.

The group was sold in 2004 and began a new life as The Local Radio Company plc, an AIM-quoted public company under the leadership of former Jazz FM CEO Richard Wheatly.

For a while, all stations owned by the quoted group, except Fire Radio, broadcast under a contemporary music format known as Music:fun:life. However this was generally not deemed a success so, after the departure of Group Programme Director Gordon Davidson in June 2006 to Emap, most stations developed their own branding.

The playlist offered a mix of new and classic pop music, with some special programming such as Party Anthems or Soul on Sunday. Network programmes broadcast by the group include The Lunchtime Gameshow which returned to the network after a break of 2 years in November 2008, hosted by John Harding and Russ Leighton broadcasting from Minster FM in York to the Northern TLRC stations; the hit40uk chart show; the urban chart show Fresh 40 and the Fierce Angel Radio Show on Saturday nights.

For six months in 2008 there were two new networked shows on the group, including the Saturday Afternoon show with Tim West (which not all stations took) and the Network Weekend Breakfast Show with Danny Mathews (previously on Capital Gold, Key 103, Century and the Magic Network). This was short-lived and, although the shows were well received by the audience / RAJAR, the shows' contracts were only six-months long and, due to the selling of many stations, these shows ceased in late 2008.

Former networked shows, such as the evening music and comedy show Simon James and Hill and late-night phone-in North-South Divided (which was broadcast jointly from studios in London and Durham to pitch listeners in the South of England against those in the North), were dropped in favour of more music-based shows that reflected the daytime sound of the TLRC stations. For a time, Sunday afternoons across the network were dedicated to a premium rate phone-in show hosted by Andy Muir, titled Money on your Mobile.

Network shows were mostly broadcast from Mix 107 in High Wycombe, although they also sometimes came from the alternative network centres at Isle of Wight Radio or Minster FM in York.

In 2005, TLRC made a large number of acquisitions including full control of east Lancashire station 2BR and Bath FM. New licences, Durham FM and Brunel FM, went on air in 2005 and 2006 respectively. In June 2007, TLRC launched Minster Northallerton which was moved into Alpha 103.2's studio outside of the stations border in Darlington. Before selling them, the company had already moved Bath studios to neighbouring Brunel FM in Swindon.

In 2007, TLRC station Isle of Wight Radio won the Sony Radio Academy Award for Radio Station of the Year (under 300,000). In 2008, Silk FM won the same award, having been shortlisted the previous year.

In June 2008, TLRC announced plans to sell six of its stations, 3TR, Bath, Brunel, Ivel, Pennine and Vale, after selling loss-incurring Dune FM earlier in the month. This was followed by Central FM in September 2008. Also in 2008, TLRC made a licensing agreement with GMG Radio for three years to run the rebranded jazzfm.com service as Jazz FM on a number of DAB multiplexes, on digital satellite and on the Internet. The station went live on 6 October 2008, sharing studios with Mix 107 in High Wycombe.

On 7 January 2009, TLRC placed Jazz FM up for sale following a strategic review of the company. The station was sold to former chairman of TLRC, Richard Wheatly, on 9 April 2009 for £1.

In 2009, The Local Radio Company was acquired by UKRD and closed or disposed of long-term loss-making stations, as well as re-branding Alpha Radio, Minster Northallerton and Durham FM Into Star Radio North East. The Local Radio Company Limited was eventually dissolved in 2021.

== Stations ==
- 2BR (Burnley)
- Fire 107.6 (Bournemouth), (Poole) and (Christchurch)
- Minster FM (North Yorkshire)
- Mix 96 (Aylesbury)
- Spire FM (Salisbury)
- Spirit FM (West Sussex and parts of Surrey, Hampshire and Isle of Wight)
- Star Radio North East (County Durham/North Yorkshire)
- 97.2 Stray FM (Harrogate)
- Sun FM (Sunderland)
- Wessex FM (Dorset)
- Yorkshire Coast Radio (Bridlington/Scarborough)

== Sold and closed stations ==
- 107.3 Abbey FM (35%) - ceased broadcasting.
- Central FM - sold to John Quinn.
- Pennine FM - sold to Pennine Media Ltd.
- Silk FM (Macclesfield) - sold to Dee 106.3 in Cheshire.
- Arrow FM (Hastings) - sold to Media Sound Holdings.
- Sovereign Radio (Eastbourne) - sold to Media Sound Holdings.
- Mix 107 (High Wycombe) - ceased broadcasting.
- Isle of Wight Radio - sold to its management.
- 107.4 The Quay (Portsmouth) - sold to Portsmouth Football Club.
- KMFM Shepway and White Cliffs Country (formerly Neptune Radio) - sold to the KM Group in 2002.
- Dune FM - sold to NIOCOM.
- Fire 107.6 - sold to Westward Broadcasting.
