= Capital Manchester and Lancashire =

Coordinates: 53.480543°N 2.253398°W

- Manchester; United Kingdom
- Broadcast area: Greater Manchester, east and central Lancashire
- Frequencies: DAB: 12A Bauer Lancashire; DAB: 11C CE Digital Manchester; FM: 102.8 MHz Chorley; FM: 99.8 MHz Burnley; FM: 102.0 MHz Manchester; FM: 106.5 MHz Preston; FM: 107.0 MHz Blackburn
- RDS: CAPITAL

Programming
- Format: Contemporary hit radio
- Network: Capital

Ownership
- Owner: Global
- Sister stations: Heart North West; Smooth North West

History
- First air date: 8 April 2019

Links
- Webcast: Global Player
- Website: Capital Manchester; Capital Lancashire (Burnley & Pendle); Capital Lancashire (Preston & Blackburn)

Capital Manchester and Lancashire is a regional radio station owned and operated by Global as part of the Capital network. It broadcasts to Greater Manchester and eastern & central parts of Lancashire from studios at the XYZ Building in Spinningfields, Manchester.

The station launched in April 2019 as a result of a merger between Capital Manchester and 2BR.

== Overview ==
The regional station originally broadcast as two separate stations.

- Kiss 102 began broadcasting to Greater Manchester in October 1994, after taking over the licence previously held by Sunset 102. After being sold to Chrysalis, it rebranded as Galaxy 102 in 1997, before becoming a part of the Capital network in January 2011.
- 2BR began broadcasting to the Burnley, Pendle and Hyndburn areas in July 2000. It was merged in June 2016 with The Bee to form a larger station under the 2BR moniker, also covering the Blackburn and Preston areas. The station was sold by UKRD to Global in July 2018.

On 26 February 2019, Global confirmed the two Capital stations would be merged, following Ofcom's decision to relax local content obligations from commercial radio.

As of April 2019, regional output consists of a three-hour drivetime show from Manchester on weekdays, alongside localised news bulletins, traffic updates and advertising for the two areas.

In late May 2021, transmissions covering the Chorley area moved from 96.3 MHz to 102.8 MHz.

== Programming ==
All programming is broadcast and produced from Global's London headquarters.

Global's Manchester newsroom broadcasts hourly localised news updates from 6am-6pm on weekdays and 8am-12pm at weekends.
