= Mix 107 =

England
- Broadcast area: High Wycombe
- Frequencies: 107.4 MHz & 107.7 MHz

Programming
- Format: Variety Hit Radio

Ownership
- Owner: The Local Radio Company

History
- First air date: 31 October 2001
- Last air date: 1 July 2009

Links
- Website: www.mix107.co.uk

Mix 107 was an Independent Local Radio station, based in High Wycombe, England. It developed from an AM licence known as Elevenseventy and its successor operation Swan FM. The brand was a result of ownership by The Local Radio Company, owners of Mix 96 in neighbouring Aylesbury. Mix 107's building was the head office for the TLRC – a group with 22 other radio stations nationwide prior to its takeover by UKRD Group.

The station closed at 10am on 1 July 2009.
