= UKRD Group =

British media company

UKRD Group Ltd
- Company type: Subsidiary
- Industry: Broadcasting
- Founded: 1990
- Defunct: 2020
- Headquarters: Redruth, Cornwall, UK
- Products: Local radio
- Owner: Bauer Radio
- Website: www.ukrd.com

The UKRD Group Ltd was a British media company that owned 15 commercial radio stations in the United Kingdom. The name originates from UK Radio Developments. Since its acquisition in March 2019, it has been run as a subsidiary of Bauer Radio.

== History ==
Formed on 22 August 1990 as a company to invest in commercial stations following the relaxation of station ownership laws, its first investment was a stake in Cornwall's Pirate FM 102, which was designed and launched by former County Sound boss Mike Powell who, after leaving County Sound, had formed Infinity Radio. Shortly after the launch, Infinity Radio merged with UK Radio Developments and Powell became CEO of the embryonic UKRD Group. Under Powell's leadership, UKRD became one of the fastest growing private radio groups in the UK, rapidly adding Star FM in Slough and winning the Guildford radio franchise which gave birth to 96.4 The Eagle, the new County Sound (a recreation of the original Guildford commercial station of the same name) and Delta Radio. Subsequently, it acquired several more stations, and launched further stations on the issue of new local licences.

UKRD acquired a significant minority share-holding in Faze FM, which ran Kiss 102 in Manchester and Kiss 105 in Yorkshire. The stations had a branding deal with EMAP's Kiss FM, London. UKRD sold its interests in the Kiss stations in 1997 to the Chrysalis Group, who added them to its Galaxy Radio network. It also had a helping hand in the launch of South Hams Radio in December 1999, which was closed in 2009 to make way for Heart.

From 2001, the head of the organisation was William Rogers, one-time leader of Penwith District Council, Cornwall.

UKRD Group's head office was within the Carn Brea Studios of Pirate FM 102 in Redruth, Cornwall. It also had offices in Guildford, Exeter and Bristol.

In 2009, it acquired The Local Radio Company which had 20 local radio stations. UKRD disposed of many non-profitable stations, as well as re-branding Alpha Radio, Minster Northallerton and Durham FM into Star Radio North East.

In 2010, UKRD was ranked 27th in the Sunday Times Best Companies to Work For (SMEs) and was ranked first in the same category every year between 2011 and 2014.

In July 2018, Global announced it had bought 2BR from UKRD. The station was previously merged with The Bee.

In March 2019, Bauer Radio acquired 10 stations from UKRD as well as three local DAB multiplexes and the interest in First Radio Sales

== Stations previously owned by UKRD Group ==
Prior to their sale to Bauer Radio, UKRD owned the following stations:

- 2BR Radio 2BR
- Eagle Radio
- Eagle 70s
- Eagle 80s
- Encore Radio
- Escape to Cornwall
- KL.FM 96.7
- Minster FM
- Mix 96
- Pirate FM
- Pirate 70s
- Spire FM
- Spirit FM
- Stray FM
- Wessex FM
- Yorkshire Coast Radio

== Crowdfunded local 'replacements' for former UKRD Group stations ==
As most of the UKRD Group stations were rebranded under the Greatest Hits Radio brand by Bauer Radio, a number of schemes were launched to establish local radio 'replacements' for these services, many of which featured the same staff/presenters as the UKRD stations and many of which were set up through crowdfunding schemes. In Sussex, V2 Radio was set up to fill the gap vacated by Spirit FM, with test transmissions starting in West Sussex in December 2020, and the new service launching fully on 18 January 2021. In York, YorkMix Radio launched with former presenters from Minster FM on air, after a successful crowdfunding scheme to get local radio back on air, whilst in the Aldershot and Woking area, Radio Biscuit could be found with presenters from Eagle Radio. and Your Harrogate Radio is scheduled to launch on 1 March.
