= Connect Radio 97.2 & 107.4 =

Former English commercial radio station

Coordinates: 52.407456°N 0.740263°W

Connect FM
- Kettering; England
- Broadcast area: Kettering, Corby, Wellingborough Northampton Peterborough and Rushden
- Frequencies: FM: 107.4 MHz, 97.2 MHz, 106.8 MHz; DAB

Programming
- Format: Contemporary, Top 40, Hit Music, '80s Hits

Ownership
- Owner: Communicorp

History
- First air date: 6 April 1990
- Last air date: 1 October 2019

Links
- Website: connectfm.com

Connect FM was an Independent Local Radio station broadcasting to Northamptonshire and Peterborough and the home counties. It was owned by Adventure Radio and based in Kettering.

On 7 February 2019, the station was purchased by Communicorp UK, merging with the group's existing East Midlands license, now rebranded as Smooth East Midlands. The station played 'hit music' songs from the 1980s to the present day, with a selection of presenters. Connect FM closed and its FM frequencies were merged with Smooth East Midlands on 1 October 2019. Its DAB transmissions were rebranded as Radio Up.

== History ==
Previous logo

The station launched as KCBC on 6 April 1990 on 1530 kHz AM. The original daytime line-up consisted of Howard Rose at breakfast time, followed by Tony Harrison, Terry Doyle, Mark Jeeves and Andy Jackson. It originally broadcast a Golden Oldies format, playing hits from the 1950s, 1960s and 1970s, in addition to local news bulletins and sports coverage. In 1992, the station switched frequency to 1584 kHz.

For a few years in the early 1990s, a few shows on KCBC were broadcast from a local school Brooke Weston City Technology College which housed a radio studio, allowing students the chance to try out working in a professional studio and even go on air.

In 1996, KCBC was purchased by The Local Radio Company. The station transferred to FM in March 1998, broadcasting on 107.4 MHz in Kettering and Corby, with a sister station, Connect FM, in Wellingborough, on 97.2 MHz. During this time KCBC was broadcast from Telford Way Industrial Estate in Kettering, while Connect FM broadcast from a small studio on the top floor of Tresham College in Wellingborough.

In August 1999, the station's new owners, Jersey-based Hub Trans Communications, merged KCBC and Connect FM, rebranding them as Connect 97.2 and 107.4, and co-locating both stations at Telford Way Industrial Estate in Kettering. The station changed hands again in May 2000, when it was bought by Forward Media. In 2007, Connect was granted permission by OFCOM to relocate to Peterborough at the headquarters of Lite FM, another station operated by Forward Media. In 2010 Connect FM moved back to Kettering after acquiring the old Tollers solicitors building in the Headlands.

In 2009, Connect was acquired by Adventure Radio. The station drew its playlist from the late 1970s, 1980s, 1990s and 2000s, under the banner of Today's Best Mix For Northamptonshire and Peterborough and in 2011, Connect FM launched a "No Repeat Nine To Five" format that guaranteed listeners wouldn't hear the same song twice during the working day. It provided hourly local news bulletins between 6am and 7pm on weekdays, 7am and 1pm on Saturdays and 8am and 1pm on Sundays.

In July 2016 the station owners Adventure Radio signed a management contract with Communicorp which would see them offer extra support to both Connect FM and Heart Hertfordshire. In 2019 Communicorp agreed to buy the services, with a view to replacing Connect FM with Smooth East Midlands.

At the time of its closure in 2019, Connect FM's longest serving on-air voices were Carlo Fiorentino, who had been with the station since 1990 and Gregg Nunney who had remained on air since 1996. The station's presenters included Liz Jeeves, Tracie Young, Paul Lovett, Mikey Faulkner, Chris Brooks, Gregg & Phil, Murray J, Daniel Fox, Jack White and Chance Litchfield.

On 1 October 2019 Connect FM's FM transmissions were replaced with Smooth, whilst its DAB transmissions were replaced with a non-stop music only service, Radio Up.
