= Forward Media =

British media company

Forward Media was a media company based in Stockport, Merseyside which operated radio stations.

== History ==
Forward Media Ltd was established in 1998 primarily to acquire and operate Lite FM in Peterborough and Connect FM in Kettering. Forward Media also previously owned Dune FM in Southport, which it purchased for £1.8m, but sold the station to The Local Radio Company in early September 2004. Connect and Lite were later sold to Adventure Radio.
