= Stray FM =

Coordinates: 53.990615°N 1.539112°W

- England
- Broadcast area: Harrogate / Yorkshire Dales (Western North Yorkshire, Northern West Yorkshire, Southeastern Cumbria & Northern Lancashire)
- Frequencies: FM: 97.2 MHz (Harrogate, Knaresborough, Ripon); 107.1 MHz (Ilkley, Otley, Pateley Bridge, Skipton; 107.8 MHz (Craven); DAB: 10C (North Yorkshire)

Programming
- Format: Contemporary

Ownership
- Owner: Bauer

History
- First air date: 4 July 1994
- Last air date: 31 August 2020

Stray FM was an Independent Local Radio station serving the western half of North Yorkshire, and sections of West Yorkshire, to the north of Leeds and Bradford, England. The original licence covered the towns of Harrogate and Ripon and the surrounding areas. From the 1st of February 2012 the station expanded to cover the Yorkshire Dales.

As part of a rebrand, the station was folded into Greatest Hits Radio Harrogate & The Yorkshire Dales on the 1st of September 2020.

== History ==
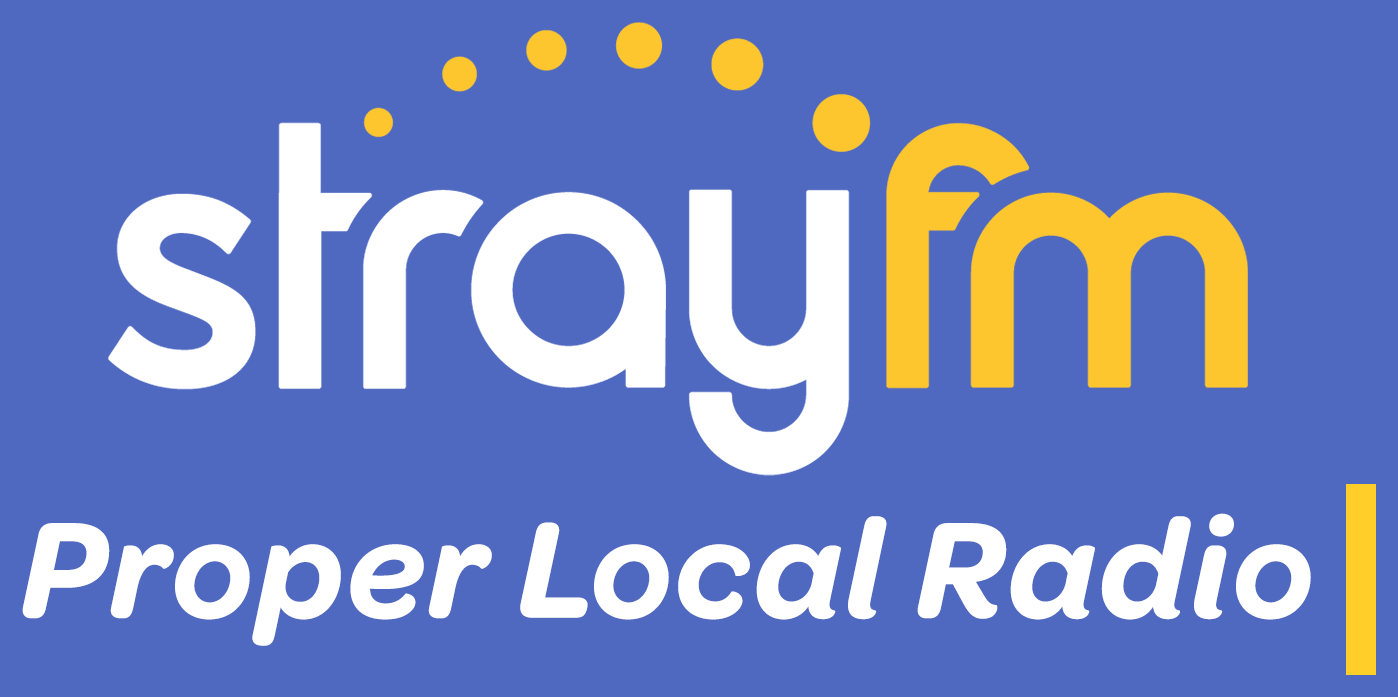
Former logo until it became GHR Harrogate & Yorkshire Dales

After completing a series of 28-day trial broadcasts in Harrogate, Stray FM won the licence to broadcast to the wider area of Harrogate, Ripon and surrounding areas and launched as a full-time station on 4 July 1994, eleven years to the day after BBC Radio York started transmitting and two years to the day after Minster FM first went on air.

In 2008, 97.2 Stray FM was awarded an Arqiva Award for "Station of the Year" (TSA under 300,000). In 2012, UKRD bought Yorkshire Dales licensee Fresh Radio. Following agreement from Ofcom, the station announced plans to cede coverage of Richmond to Star Radio North East and to switch off the AM transmitters, rolling the remaining portions of the old Yorkshire Dales licence into an integrated and enlarged licence.

On 17 December 2014, Stray FM started broadcasting on DAB digital radio, under the name Stray Extra. It was broadcast on the North Yorkshire DAB multiplex from various locations within the county, including Bilsdale, Acklam Wold, Hildebrand Barracks and Oliver's Mount. Stray Extra carried Stray FM programmes in the morning and through the day, but during the evening the DAB schedule differed from the FM version, broadcasting its own dedicated programming. The DAB service was later merged with the FM service as Stray FM.

On 5 March 2019, Bauer announced agreement to purchase the UKRD Group. The whole UKRD Group, including Stray FM was placed into hold separate by the Competition and Markets Authority on 12 March 2019 subject to completion of a merger inquiry.

Bauer announced on 27 May 2020 that Stray FM would be rebranded as Greatest Hits Radio Yorkshire from early September 2020.
