= Nation Radio North East =

Radio station in Sunderland, England

Coordinates: 54.91839°N 1.419921°W

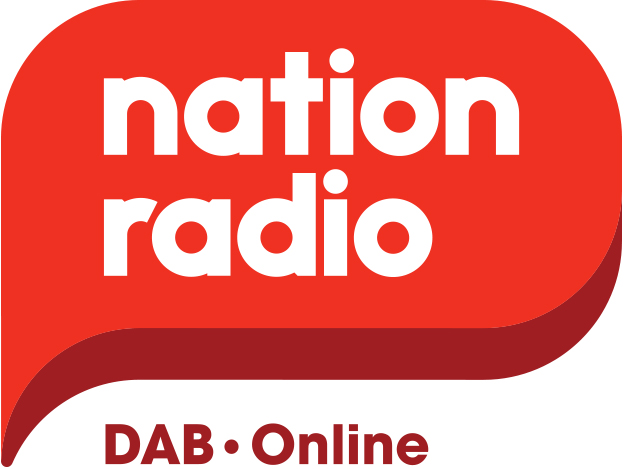
- Sunderland; United Kingdom
- Broadcast area: Tyne and Wear, County Durham, Northumberland, Teesside and North Yorkshire
- Frequencies: FM: 103.2 MHz (Darlington); FM: 102.8 MHz & 106.8 MHz (Durham); FM: 103.4 MHz (Sunderland & Wearside)
- Branding: “The Best Variety of Hits”

Programming
- Format: Contemporary
- Network: Nation Radio

Ownership
- Owner: Nation Broadcasting

History
- First air date: 5 November 1990 (as Wear FM) - 33 years ago
- Former names: Wear FM (1990–1995); Sun City FM (1995–1997); Sun FM (1997-2024)

Links
- Webcast: Radioplayer
- Website: Nation Radio North East

Nation Radio North East is an Independent Local Radio station broadcasting from studios in Sunderland to across the North East region of England which includes Northumberland, Tyne and Wear, County Durham, Teesside and parts of North Yorkshire. It is owned by Nation Broadcasting.

== Overview ==
Nation Radio North East broadcasts on FM, DAB, as well as online. The station plays a mix of contemporary and classic popular music alongside local news and travel.

== Audience ==
As of October 2025, the station broadcasts to a weekly audience of 80,000, according to RAJAR.

== History ==
=== Wear FM ===
The station was launched by the Sunderland Community Radio Station in 1990 and broadcast as Wear FM, based at the University of Sunderland. Wear FM gained international acclaim for its community programming and social inclusion and won the Sony Award for UK Radio Station of the Year in 1992.

Wear FM ceased transmissions in 1995 when it was taken over by the Minster Sound Group, who relaunched the station as Sun City FM. The station's studios in the Forster Building were taken over by the University of Sunderland.

=== Sun City FM ===
Sun City took over when Wear FM ceased broadcasting in 1995. Sun City 103.4's operator was financially penalised in that year by the Radio Authority for not fully adhering to elements of their Promise of Performance.

=== Sun FM ===
A sale to Border Radio Holdings followed with the new owners rebranding the station as Sun FM. In January 1999, Brian Lister joined as managing director. Sun FM became part of the Capital Radio Group when they acquired Border Radio in April 2000 as part of a three-way deal with Granada TV.

The Sun FM logo during its UKRD Group ownership.

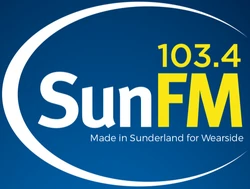
Final logo used from 2017 to 2018 before its sale to Nation Broadcasting.

In March 2001, Radio Investments Limited purchased Sun FM and its parent company Bucks Broadcasting. This sale also included the other group station, Mix 96 in Aylesbury. Radio Investments later became known as The Local Radio Company and, in June 2009, was itself acquired by UKRD Group.

In 2018, UKRD Group sold Sun FM to Wales-based radio operator Nation Broadcasting. In March 2020, Nation Broadcasting bought neighbouring Durham Radio and Alpha Radio, merging the stations into Sun FM to enlarge the broadcast area to include large parts of County Durham.

=== Nation Radio North East ===
On 2 April 2024, Nation Broadcasting announced that Sun FM will be rebranded to Nation Radio North East as of 1 May 2024. They will also expand the station onto the local DAB multiplexes across the North East to include Newcastle, Gateshead, Middlesbrough, Bishop Auckland and Darlington.

== Programming & presenters ==
=== Programming ===
Nation Radio North East broadcasts a mix of regional and networked programming.

=== Regional Shows ===
- Weekday Breakfast with Simon Grundy
- Weekday Drivetime with Dave Sherwood

=== Local Presenters ===
- Simon Grundy
- Dave Sherwood

=== Networked Presenters ===
- Tim Allen
- Gary Parker
- Mark Collins
- Mark Franklin
- Tony Shepherd
- Roberto
- Neil Greenslade
- Neil Fox
- Greg Burns

== Programming ==
As Nation Radio North East, local programming is broadcast from 6am to 10am and 3pm to 7pm Monday to Friday. The rest of the time it takes networked programming from Nation Radio UK, with opt-outs for news, sport, travel and weather updates. During local programming, the station plays a separate playlist to Nation Radio UK.

== Transmission ==
Nation Radio North East's transmission facility is located on farmland at Haining, to the south-west of Sunderland. It transmits with an ERP of 300 watts.
