= Simon James and Hill =

Simon James and "Hill" (real names Simon Richard Burrell and James Edward Burrell respectively) are UK radio presenters and voice-over artists.

The pair began their careers in 1996 presenting the afternoon programme on Hallam FM in Sheffield, before moving to Liverpool to host shows on both Radio City and its sister station Magic 1548. In 1998, they moved to Radio Aire in Leeds to host drivetime. This programme was a concoction of sketches, surreal on-the-street interviews with members of the public and spoof competitions. It quickly increased its audience substantially and also became critically acclaimed, receiving the gold Sony Radio Academy award for Best Drivetime in 1999.

A move to Manchester followed in 2002, where the duo presented the drivetime programme on the Northwest regional station Century FM (now Real Radio). There they received a second Sony Radio Academy award in 2002, this time for Best Daytime Music Programme. A year later, the pair joined Virgin Radio (now Absolute Radio) to present a late night show that developed a cult following and saw the birth of two of the duo's trademark features. Firstly, "Around the World" (in which contestants had to guess the length of a live conversation between the presenters and a foreign hotel receptionist) and the "One-Sided phone calls" which were a departure from the tried and tested telephone prank.

Simon and Hill then had a spell presenting a Saturday afternoon sports show on the Capital Gold network, before joining the Local Radio Company in 2005 to host an independently produced evening show which was syndicated across the group's 27 stations nationwide. This programme had an alternative music focus, and featured regular sessions from both established and upcoming bands. The programme was one of the first in the country to feature Arctic Monkeys. It received a silver Sony Radio Academy award for Best Interactive Programme in 2006.

In January 2008, the pair joined Kerrang! Radio in the West Midlands, initially to present drivetime. They took over the breakfast show in May of the same year and held this position until they left Kerrang! at the end of 2011. In that time they secured a further two Sony Radio Academy awards. Firstly, the silver for Music Radio Personalities Of The Year in 2009 (where they were beaten to gold only by Chris Evans), and most recently the bronze for Best Breakfast Show in 2011.

During their time at Kerrang! Radio, Simon and Hill became best noted for blurring reality and theatre. Guests generally appeared remotely (apparently speaking from a mysterious "booth" in London), and often it was never clear which parts of an interview were genuine and which were the result of deliberately bizarre editing.
