= 102.6 & 106.8 Durham FM =

Durham FM
Durham; England
- Broadcast area: County Durham
- Frequencies: 102.8 and 106.8 MHz

Programming
- Format: Contemporary

Ownership
- Owner: The Local Radio Company

History
- First air date: 5 December 2005
- Last air date: 2010

Durham FM was an Independent Local Radio station based in Durham, County Durham, England.

== History ==
From its launch in 2005, Durham FM was owned and operated by TLRC.

In December 2008, Durham FM submitted an application to Ofcom to co-locate with sister station, Sun FM in Sunderland. Following a consultation, the majority of responses were against the idea.

In July 2009, Ofcom give permission to rename Durham FM to Alpha Durham, and sister station Minster Northallerton to Alpha Northallerton. All programmes on would be shared, except for a local breakfast show and four-hour show on Saturday and Sunday, each produced and broadcast locally. Previously, TLRC asked for Ofcom approval to move Durham FM further north to Sunderland to share facilities with Sun FM, but a decision was delayed by the regulator.

Instead, the three stations became part of UKRD's Star brand and the station's frequencies were then used to broadcast Star Radio North East which was formed when UKRD merged the services of Durham FM with Alpha 103.2 and Minster Northallerton. Until 2010, a daily local breakfast show was produced for the former Durham FM area.

=== Ex-presenters ===
- Peter Grant
- Craig Andrews
- Steve Phillips
- Vic Ribbands
- Chris Hakin
- Dicky Ord
- Dave 'Ceefax' Fenwick
- Geoff Longstaff
- Mike Jinx
- Marie Gardiner
- Mike Nicholson
- Kyle Wilkinson
- Les Gunn
- Mike Patterson
- Pete Clough
- Mat Page
- Tim West
- Sarah Knapper
- Lisa Dawson

=== Ex-Newsreaders ===
- Julie Howe (News Editor)
- Louise Bostock
- Emily Bull
- Ed Turner
