= Spire FM =

Salisbury; England
- Broadcast area: Salisbury
- Frequencies: FM: 102.0 MHz; DAB+: 8A (Trial Salisbury)

Programming
- Format: Contemporary

Ownership
- Owner: Bauer Radio

History
- First air date: 20 September 1992
- Last air date: 1 September 2020

Links
- Website: www.spirefm.co.uk

Spire FM was an Independent Local Radio station based in Salisbury, Wiltshire. It was awarded the licence to broadcast to Salisbury and the surrounding areas by the Radio Authority, now Ofcom, in 1991. The station took its name from the spire of Salisbury Cathedral.

After several changes of ownership, it was rolled up into Greatest Hits Radio in September 2020, ceasing local programming.

== History ==
The station was fully launched on 20 September 1992 (the licence ran from the 5th, when test transmissions began to include programmes about the Salisbury Arts Festival). Spire FM broadcast from City Hall Studios in Malthouse Lane, Salisbury, part of the City Hall entertainment venue.

Originally independently owned, it was acquired by Radio Investments Limited in 1995, and from 1996 the station was owned by The Local Radio Company, which was a joint venture with GWR Group until it was converted into an AIM-quoted company in 2004. TLRC was acquired by UKRD Group in 2009, and Bauer Radio bought UKRD's ten stations in 2019.

Spire FM won a prestigious Sony Radio Award for Station of the Year in 1994 and the runner-up award in 2003. Other awards included the KPMG Marketing Excellence Award, and Wiltshire Business of the Year finalists.

Bauer Media rebranded the station as Greatest Hits Radio Salisbury in September 2020, as part of their national Greatest Hits Radio network. It now broadcasts national and regional music programmes with local news bulletins.

In January 2024, Bauer dropped local news bulletins for Salisbury - determining these to sound "jarring and parochial" alongside networked programming - and instead transmitted bulletins shared with the (then digital-only, prior to the April flip of Wave 105) South Hampshire iteration of GHR. Salisbury-specific bulletins on weekdays were reinstated in March 2024. Ofcom considered that a complaint about the lack of local news material had been resolved by their reintroduction.

== Programming ==
All programming on the station was locally produced. Until 2018, Spire FM broadcast The Vodafone Big Top 40 chart show (previously The Pepsi Chart and Hit40UK) which was produced from Capital FM in London and syndicated across over 140 commercial radio stations in the UK. However, the show was withdrawn from syndication in 2018 and now broadcasts solely on Heart and Capital stations.
