= Central FM (Stirling) =

103.1 Central FM
- Stirling; Scotland
- Broadcast area: Stirling, Falkirk and Clackmannanshire
- Frequencies: FM: 103.1 MHz; DAB+: 9C

Programming
- Format: AC

Ownership
- Owner: John Quinn

History
- First air date: 4 June 1990

Technical information
- Power: 500 watts
- Transmitter coordinates: 56.0716°N 4.0604°W

Links
- Website: Central FM

Central FM is an Independent Local Radio station serving Falkirk, Stirling, Clackmannanshire and the Forth Valley. It is owned and operated by businessman John Quinn and, as of February 2026, broadcasts from studios in Henderson Street in Bridge of Allan near Stirling.

As of September 2026, the station broadcasts to a weekly audience of 40,000, according to RAJAR.

== History ==
In December 1988, the Independent Broadcasting Authority announced it had chosen the Stirling area as one of twenty areas of the UK where new incremental radio licences were to be awarded. A month later, the regulator advertised the Stirling licence, permitting any station format.

Centresound, a community-based station founded by a local community association, began broadcasting on Monday 4 June 1990 from studios at the John Player Building in the Stirling Enterprise Park but within two months, fell into financial difficulties due to problems in attracting enough investment to maintain an independent operation.

The board of directors resigned when the long-established Radio Forth went into partnership with Centresound after investing in the station. An overhaul saw the station relaunch as Central FM, sharing programming, news content and administration with Forth under an agreement. The move was criticised as being in commercial interests, rather than for the community's benefit, but station manager Brian Hawkins argued the station was broadcasting more local output than before and no complaints had been received. The Radio Authority went on to award a new ten-year licence to Central FM in December 1993.

The station continued to record a loss, and in 1996, Radio Investments Ltd gained control after increasing its stake to 60%, ending the partnership with Radio Forth and leading to the station relocating to studios in Falkirk. Later, the controlling share passed onto The Local Radio Company, with 20% held by EMAP and the rest by independent investors.

Chairman, John Quinn took control of Central FM in 2008. In October 2012, the station returned to Stirling with the opening of new studios at the Springkerse Industrial Estate. In August 2013, Central FM began broadcasting on DAB across Central Scotland.

On 1 December 2016, three online-only stations were launched under the Central FM brand; Central FM Chart (playing non-stop hits), Central FM Country (24-hour current and classic country hits) and Central FM Gold (non-stop '60s, '70s and '80s hits). All are accessible from the station website and downloadable app. These online stations have now ceased transmission.

== Awards ==
Central FM won the Scotland category in the Radio Academy Nations and Regions Awards twice in 2008 and 2011. It also won the Sony Gold Award for best UK station (in a TSA under 300,000 listeners) in 2012 and placed in the top three of stations (TSA under 500,000 listeners) at the 2013 Arqiva Commercial Radio Awards and won the Silver Award for Station of The Year at The Arqiva Radio Awards 2015.

== Programming ==
Central FM's Programming is headed by Brad Yule, the station's Programme Controller. Central FM's programming is produced and broadcast from its Stirling studios. Presenter-led programming airs from 6 am to 7 pm from Monday - Friday, 7am to 6pm on Saturdays and 7am to 10pm on Sundays.

The station's presenters include Brad Yule (Weekday Breakfast), Sharon Oakley (Weekday Breakfast), Stuart McCafferty (Weekday Daytime & Weekend Breakfast), Stuart Smith (Weekday Drivetime & Saturday Afternoons), Liv Cowle (Weekday Evenings), Brian Woolfson (Weekend Daytime), Gav & Hannah (Sunday Afternoons) and Ellie Foster (Sunday Evenings)

=== News ===
Local news bulletins air hourly from 6 am – 7 pm on weekdays, 7 am – 1 pm on Saturdays and 8 am – 1 pm on Sundays with headlines on the half-hour during breakfast and drivetime shows. National bulletins from Sky News Radio in London air during all other hours.

=== Travel ===
Local travel news air hourly from 6 am – 7 pm on weekdays & 8 am – 12 pm on Saturdays. These bulletins are provided from INRIX based at the National Control Centre in South Queensferry, Edinburgh in Scotland.
