= Paul Smith (blogger) =

British blogger, writer, and former radio executive

Paul Smith OBE is a British blogger, writer, and former radio executive. An advocate of social media, Smith coined the phrase "twitchhiking" in February 2009 when he travelled around the world using the social media network Twitter.

== Radio career ==
Smith began his radio career at commercial station Alpha 103.2 as a 'presenter and dogsbody' before joining Metro Radio and then 96.6 TFM as a copywriter and subsequently Head of Creative, where he also presented football show "90 Minutes". In March 2003, he joined the BBC as a Programmes Editor in BBC Local Radio before moving on to BBC Radio 7 as Executive producer, where he recruited Richard Bacon (broadcaster) as weekday breakfast announcer. At BBC Radio Manchester, he launched and produced the Terry Christian breakfast show, before moving to Galaxy Yorkshire as the producer of Hirsty's Daily Dose. Smith then joined 100-102 Century Radio as Programme Controller, before leaving in September 2007.

== Twitchhiker ==
In February 2009, Smith launched the Twitchhiker Project, an attempt to travel "as far around the world as possible in 30 days, relying only on the goodwill of people using the social media network Twitter." The rules of the project meant Smith could spend no money on transport or accommodation, he only accept offers of help through Twitter, his travel plans could only be made up to three days in advance and if he was stranded anywhere for longer than 48 hours, Smith had to abandon his journey.

After thirty days and with the aid of over 11,000 Twitter followers, Smith had travelled as far as Stewart Island in New Zealand, raising over £5,000 for charity: water. His intended destination had been Campbell Island, several hundred miles further south.

The project was covered by media around the world, including Good Morning America and the Los Angeles Times in the US, the BBC, The Sun and This Morning in the UK as well as numerous tech blogs and other media outlets. Smith has since presented to seminars and events about the project and how social media can benefit business.

== Writing ==
As a writer, Smith has contributed to both the travel, technology and media sections of The Guardian, as well as writing for satirical site Holy Moly. He was previously the co-editor of consumer blog Bitterwallet.com.

In November 2009, Smith announced he had been contracted by Summersdale Publishing to write a book based on Twitchhiker. The book, Twitchhiker: How One Man Travelled the World by Twitter, was published in the UK in August 2010 by Summersdale Publishers and subsequently translated and re-published for the Taiwanese, Indian and Polish markets. A sequel, Tales from the Edge of America, was published in February 2013, with a foreword written by The Inbetweeners creator Iain Morris.

== Order of the British Empire ==
In December 2019, Smith was awarded an OBE for services to Technology in Newcastle upon Tyne.
