= Dune FM =

Coordinates: 53°37′52.2″N 3°0′9.6″W

- England
- Broadcast area: Southport, Ormskirk and Sefton
- Frequency: 107.9 MHz

Programming
- Format: Adult / Oldies

History
- First air date: 12 October 1997
- Last air date: 8 August 2012

Technical information
- Power: 100 watts

Links
- Website: www.dune1079.co.uk

Dune FM was an Independent Local Radio station serving Southport, Sefton and surrounding areas between 1997 and 2012.

== Origins ==
Dune FM originally broadcast two temporary restricted service licences (RSLs) in 1993. The first RSL was broadcast from makeshift studios at the rear of the town's Floral Hall complex, with the transmitter on the roof of The Southport Theatre. The second broadcast saw the station move to a new base above the Victoria Health & Leisure club, with the transmitter at Greenbank High School in the Hillside area of the town.

The station then broadcast two RSLs as "Magic Dune FM", with a target area of the town and neighbouring West Lancashire and North Sefton, and a transmitter close to the present site of Aughton near Ormskirk.

The Radio Authority eventually advertised a small-scale local licence for the towns of Southport and Ormskirk and the Merseyside borough of Sefton, which attracted three bids, including the winning Dune FM consortium.

== Full-time licence ==
Dune FM was originally owned by local shareholders, including Steve Dickson, David Maker, Philip Hilton, John Cooper, and the founder of Blackpool's Radio Wave, John Barnett. The station found a permanent home at a former substation building on Victoria Way, renamed The Power Station.

== Changing hands ==
Dune FM was sold to Forward Media in 1999, backed by venture capital finance and chaired by David Maker, at a time when the station claimed its highest listening figures.

In 2004, the station was bought by The Local Radio Company Plc. who introduced networked programming. In June 2008, Dune FM was bought from TLRC by NIOCOM Limited, and renamed Dune 107.9.

January 2011 saw the station transferred to the ownership of Southport Radio Limited, a group headed by local DJ Jon Jessop and including many of the original group who ran RSL broadcasts under the 'Southport Radio' moniker. The station relaunched again in February 2011 under the original name of Dune FM.

== Financial problems ==
Around the time of the buyout, the station had been suffering from financial problems. In October 2011, High Court enforcement officers acting for multiple creditors removed the station's broadcasting equipment from its studios, forcing makeshift facilities to be quickly assembled to get back on-air. During March 2012, a Statutory Demand notice was published in the Southport Champion newspaper, claiming Dune FM Limited owed a significant sum to Proud FM Limited. On Monday 9 July 2012 Dune FM Ltd was wound up in the Liverpool District Registry

== Closure ==
Following the winding-up order, the station's licence passed into the hands of the official receiver. OFCOM ordered the station to cease broadcasting by 2 August 2012, a deadline which was ignored by Dune's owner. Six days after the deadline, OFCOM engineers attended the transmitter site at Gaws Hill, Ormskirk, accompanied by Dune's transmission contractor, and removed the transmission equipment. The station went off air at 12.23pm.

The station now exclusively broadcasts online as Coast1079, using the same format and personalities with similar branding.
