= Minster Northallerton =

England
- Broadcast area: North Yorkshire
- Frequencies: 102.3 & 103.5 MHz

Programming
- Format: Adult Contemporary

Ownership
- Owner: Local Radio Company

History
- First air date: 11 June 2007

Minster Northallerton was an Independent Local Radio station based in Northallerton, North Yorkshire, England.

== History ==
Prior to launch, Minster Northallerton was originally known as BTN FM, after the principal towns of the area - Bedale, Thirsk and Northallerton. The Local Radio Company were awarded the franchise in November 2005 by OFCOM and the station launched on 11 June 2007.

The station was later given permission by OFCOM to move into the same building as Alpha Radio in Darlington which is outside of Minster Northallerton's broadcast area and to share some programmes with Alpha Radio. The station was also going to be renamed as Alpha Northallerton.

These plans were amended, and the Northallerton service ultimately broadcast Star Radio North East which was formed when the parent company decided to merge Minster Northallerton with Alpha 103.2 and Durham FM. The signal was broadcast on two FM frequencies, a 40 watt signal on 103.5, as well as the former Thirsk relay of sister station Minster FM on 102.3 FM.

In March 2017, when the other licences which made up Star Radio North East were sold to ViewTV Group and relaunched as Rathergood Radio, UKRD retained the Northallerton frequencies and received permission to revert these to relaying Minster FM. Following the acquisition of Minster FM by Bauer Radio, since September 2020 the Minster FM frequencies, including those in Northallerton, carry Greatest Hits Radio York and North Yorkshire.

=== Past presenters ===
- Rafe Parker
- Chris Hakin
- Pete Egerton
- Tim West
- Alex Cann
- Mike Nicholson
- Martin Reay
- Paul Denton
- Tony Collins
- Stu Leighton
- Suzi Martin
- Mike Patterson
