= The Bee (radio station) =

Coordinates: 53.7699°N 2.3897°W

- England
- Broadcast area: Blackburn, East Lancashire, Preston, Leyland and Chorley
- Frequencies: FM: 96.3 MHz; 106.5 MHz; 107.0 MHz

Programming
- Format: Hot AC

Ownership
- Owner: UKRD
- Sister stations: 2BR

History
- First air date: 1 October 2005
- Last air date: 26 May 2016

The Bee was an Independent Local Radio station serving southern and eastern parts of Lancashire, England. On Friday 27 May 2016, The Bee merged with its sister Lancashire station 2BR.

The station was owned and operated by UKRD and broadcast from studios at Clayton-le-Moors in Accrington.

== History ==
The Bee initially broadcast to the Blackburn, Darwen and Accrington areas under restricted service licences (RSLs) in 2001 and 2002, before winning a permanent licence in December 2004. The station, founded by Roy Martin, launched full-time on 1 October 2005. Its investors included neighbouring station 2BR, The Radio Business and local shareholders. Initially based at Dalton Court in Darwen, the station moved to Petre Court in Clayton-le-Moors in August 2010, co-locating with 2BR.

At 7pm on 17 June 2011, the station began broadcasting to the Preston, Leyland and Chorley areas on 106.5 FM, following the sale and subsequent closure of 106.5 Central Radio. A further relay (96.3FM) for the Chorley area went on air in 2012.

On 4 April 2016, UKRD announced The Bee would be closed and merged with its sister East Lancashire station 2BR as part of an expansion onto DAB. The merged station carries the same 2BR programming and identity with opt-outs for local news, traffic and advertising in the Burnley, Blackburn and Preston & Chorley areas.

In July 2018, the expanded 2BR was brought by Global.

== Frequencies ==
- 96.3FM Chorley
- 106.5FM Preston and South Ribble
- 107.0 FM Blackburn, Darwen and Accrington
