= Tony and Julie Wadsworth =

British radio presenters

Tony Wadsworth
- Born: 1947 (age 78–79); Leicester, England
- Occupation: Radio presenter
- Known for: Radio presenter on BBC Radio WM and BBC Radio Leicester
- Spouse: Julie Wadsworth (née Mayer)
- Status: Convicted (released on parole by November 2021)
- Criminal charges: Indecent assault of underage boys; outraging public decency
- Penalty: 5 years imprisonment

Details
- Date: 1992–1996

Julie Wadsworth
- Born: Julie Mayer; 1957 (age 68–69)
- Occupation: Radio presenter, seamstress
- Known for: Radio presenter on BBC Radio WM and BBC Radio Leicester
- Spouse: Tony Wadsworth
- Status: Convicted (released on parole by November 2021)
- Criminal charges: Indecent assault of underage boys; Outraging public decency
- Penalty: 5 years imprisonment

Details
- Victims: Six underage boys
- Date: 1992–1996

Tony Wadsworth and Julie Wadsworth (née Mayer, known professionally by her maiden name) are former English radio presenters and convicted paedophilia child sexual abusers who presented shows on both BBC Radio WM and BBC Radio Leicester. They were most recently heard on Radio Leicester, and for a time were known as the "Richard and Judy" of local radio. In 2017, they were both sentenced to five years in prison after being convicted on several counts of historic child sexual abuse that occurred during the 1990s.

== Marriage and radio careers ==
Tony Wadsworth was born in Leicester circa 1947. He worked for a time in his family's business, before getting into broadcasting, presenting Weekdays with Waddo on BBC Radio Leicester. His father, Tommy Wadsworth, was also a presenter at Radio Leicester, and was one of the first voices to be heard on the station when it launched in 1968. The younger Wadsworth met Julie Mayer while she was working as a seamstress at Leicester's Haymarket Theatre and hired her to make a costume for a charity event. They were married in 1994. She continued to use 'Mayer' as her on-air surname after their marriage. In 2004, Mayer revealed that she had been diagnosed with skin cancer. She was given the all clear the following year after undergoing surgery.

Following their marriage, Wadsworth moved to the BBC Radio WM studios at Pebble Mill in Birmingham, presenting all the mainstream programmes. Alongside Mayer, he also presented the regional Late Show; the couple subsequently became known as the "Richard and Judy" of local radio. In 2005, Wadsworth and Mayer returned to Leicester and resumed broadcasting on Radio Leicester. There, Wadsworth presented the weekday mid-morning show, while Mayer was a travelling reporter, presenting from the station's radio car on both the breakfast show and the programme that followed. The Wadsworths presented at BBC Leicester until their arrests in 2015. In November 2015 they returned to BBC Radio WM for a one-off show to celebrate the station's 45th anniversary.

== Charity work and awards ==
Wadsworth and Mayer involved themselves in charity, including raising funds for children's charities, and in 2001 organised Tony and Julie's Children of Merit honours for children who had "shown great courage or exceptional kindness." Medals for the awards were produced by the Birmingham Mint. On another occasion, Wadsworth performed in a Beatles tribute band for charity. Julie Wadsworth once posed for a BBC-sanctioned Calendar Girls-style photoshoot to raise funds for Children in Need.

Wadsworth won several awards, including: a Sony award for the Best Local Radio Programme, a Gillard gold award for the Best Daytime Programme, a Gillard silver award for the reality radio soap series: The Street, and a Gillard bronze award for The Street Party. He was awarded an Honorary Degree of Doctor of Letters in 2012 by De Montfort University in recognition of his services to broadcasting and to the Leicestershire community.

== Child sexual abuse allegations and conviction ==
In January 2016, the Wadsworths went off air for "personal reasons," and in April it was announced that both had been charged with historical child sex offences. Their trial at Warwick Crown Court began on 19 May 2017; the couple denied the charges.

The charges mostly involved the couple luring young boys into sex with Mayer while Wadsworth acted as a "lookout." The incidents occurred between 1992 and 1996, when the boys were aged from 11 to 15. The offences happened at a golf course and in surrounding woodland near the Warwickshire market town of Atherstone and at the couple's residence, also at Atherstone.

On 9 June 2017, the Wadsworths were convicted on nine charges of indecently assaulting six under-age boys and on five counts of outraging public decency, by a majority verdict of 10–2. Mayer was cleared of a further charge relating to an incident said to have occurred at the couple's home. Each was jailed for five years, and ordered to register as sex offenders for life. In his summing up statement, Judge Andrew Lockhart QC described the case as "grave offending against boys, some of whom were very young – I have come to a view that all were damaged by their experience."

Following their convictions, a spokesperson for the BBC stated that the Wadsworths were no longer employed by the corporation. De Montfort University revoked Tony Wadsworth's doctorate. The Wadsworths became eligible to be considered for parole on 6 January 2020. On 7 November 2021, the Sunday Mercury reported that the couple had recently been released from prison.
