= Warwickshire Justice Centre =

Judicial building in Leamington Spa, England

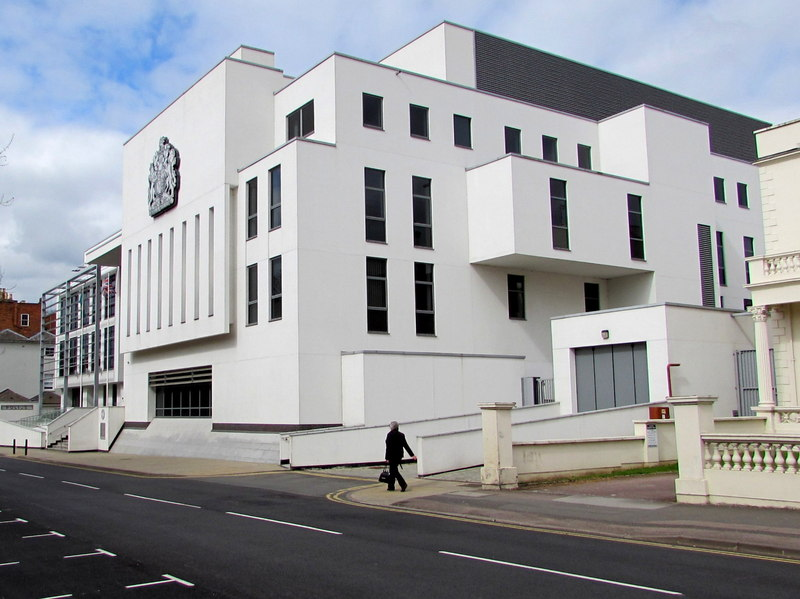
- Warwickshire Justice Centre

- Shown in Warwickshire
- 52.2883°N 1.5334°W
- Location: Newbold Terrace, Leamington Spa

History
- Built: 2010

Site notes
- Architect: HLM
- Architectural style: Modernist style

The Warwickshire Justice Centre is a Crown Court venue, which deals with criminal cases, as well as a County Court venue, which deals with civil cases, in Newbold Terrace, Leamington Spa, England. The complex also incorporates magistrates' court, a police station, and other agencies such as the Probation Service and Victim Support.

== History ==
Until the early 21st century, the Crown and County Courts in Warwickshire were based at Shire Hall in Warwick. However, as the number of court cases in the county grew, it became necessary to commission a more modern courthouse for both Crown Court hearings and County Court hearings. The site selected by the Ministry of Justice, on the northwest side of Newbold Terrace, had been occupied by a row of Regency style houses erected in the mid-19th century. These buildings had been badly damaged by German bombing during the Second World War and replaced by a series of low-rise buildings including some government offices, a magistrates' court building and a police station in the 1960s.

The new building was intended to re-recreate the scale and massing of the original Regency style housing. Construction started in July 2008. It was designed by HLM in the Modernist style, built by Galliford Try in white stucco at a cost of £26.3 million and was completed in December 2010. It was officially opened by Queen Elizabeth II on 4 March 2011.

The design involved a main frontage in three main sections facing Newbold Terrace. The left hand section of five bays was fenestrated on the first and second floors by rows of casement windows, which were fronted by a slatted structure which was projected forward. The central section, which was recessed, was formed by a flight of steps leading up to a revolving door giving access to a full-height atrium, while the right hand section, which was taller than the other sections, was fenestrated by a series of recessed lancet windows spanning the first and second floors, which were surmounted by a huge Royal coat of arms. Internally, the complex was laid out to accommodate seven courtrooms, a magistrates' court, a police station, and other agencies such as the Probation Service and Victim Support.

Notable cases included the trial and conviction of the radio presenters, Tony and Julie Wadsworth, in June 2017, in connection with historical child sex offences.
