= Silk Radio =

Cheshire's Silk Radio
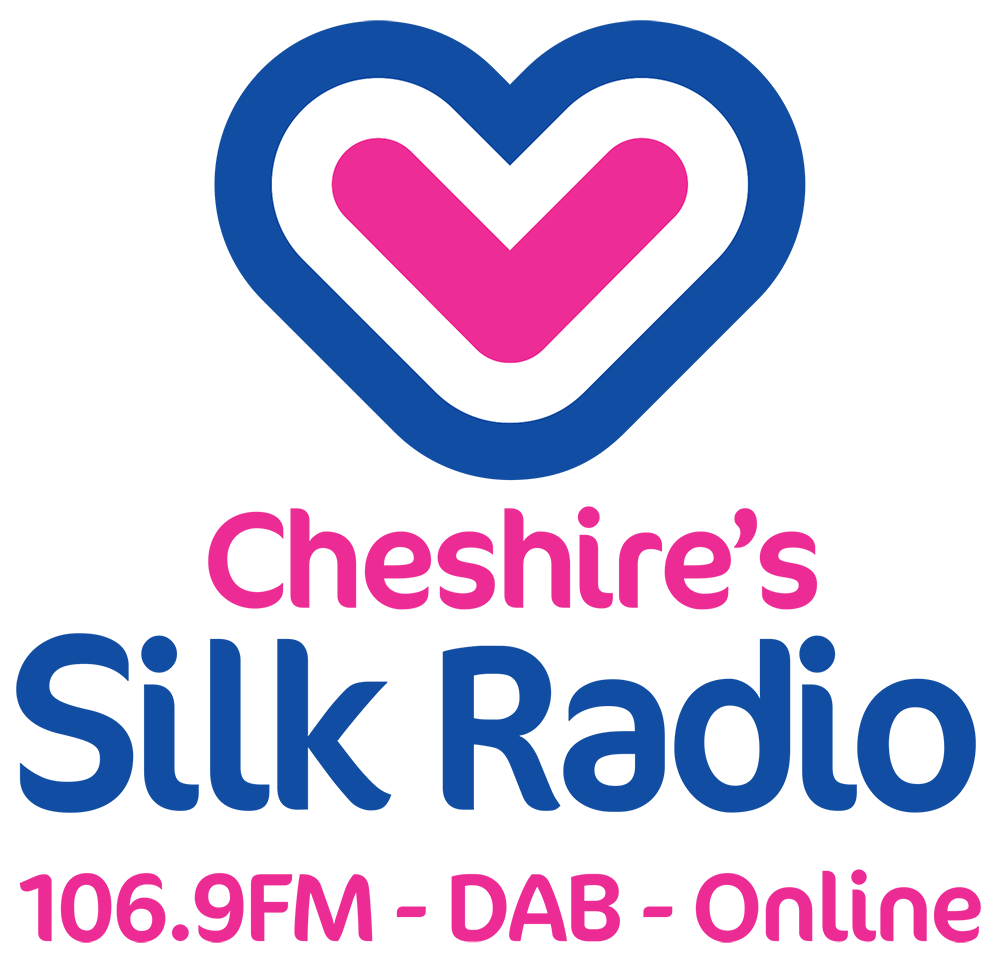
- Macclesfield; England
- Broadcast area: East Cheshire
- Frequencies: FM: 106.9 MHz; DAB: 7D (Crewe and Nantwich); 9A (Congleton and Leek)
- RDS: SILK1069

Programming
- Format: AC

Ownership
- Owner: Dee Radio Group
- Sister stations: Chester's Dee Radio

History
- First air date: 26 May 1998; 28 years ago
- Former names: Silk FM; Cheshire's Silk 106.9

Technical information
- Transmitter coordinates: 53.2061°N 2.1007°W

Links
- Website: Silk Radio

Cheshire's Silk Radio is an Independent Local Radio serving Macclesfield and parts of East Cheshire, owned and operated by neighbouring station Chester's Dee Radio.

It broadcasts a mix of current and classic hits alongside local news and sport.

As of March 2024, the station broadcasts to a weekly audience of 7,000, according to RAJAR.

== History ==
Silk FM launched on 25 May 1998 with special guest Sammy McIlroy, then manager of Macclesfield Town Football Club. Past presenters have included Nick Wright, Jeff Cooper, Guy Morris, Paul Allen and Trevor Thomas.

The station was previously owned by The Local Radio Company before being sold to the owners of Dee 106.3 in June 2009. In January 2017 the station moved into a new studio complex at Adelaide House, Adelaide Street in Macclesfield.

In November 2012, the station was granted a significant transmitter power increase, partly to combat co-channel interference from the Heart North and Mid Wales transmitter at the Moel-y-Parc transmitting station, also broadcasting on 106.9 MHz FM. The transmitter site at Sutton Common BT Tower offers a line of sight across the Cheshire plain, meaning the signal can be heard into Lancashire, Shropshire, Staffordshire, Derbyshire, Greater Manchester and Merseyside.

On 25 May 2023, the station celebrated its 25th anniversary by launching on DAB on the South Cheshire Multiplex. With the transmitter being located on the roof of South Cheshire College

== Community ==
The station awards the title School of the Week to schools within its broadcast area. Perhaps the most important awards it gives are the "Local Hero awards" which have been awarded since the stations inception.

The annual Cheshire Show is one of the highlights in the Silk calendar, of which the station offers extensive coverage.

== Awards ==
In 2008, having been short-listed for the award in the previous year, Silk won Radio Station of the Year (under 300,000) at the Sony Radio Awards. It was again short-listed for the 2009 award.

In 2006, 2007 and 2008, Silk was named Radio Academy North West Station of the Year.

== Programming ==
Some of Silk Radio's programming is produced and broadcast from its Macclesfield studios. Live programming airs from 6am-7pm on weekdays, 8am-6pm on Saturdays and 8am-8pm on Sundays. Other output is automated or networked from Riverside Innovation Centre in Chester - Chester's Dee Radio.

Silk Radio broadcasts hourly local, and national news bulletins from Radio News Hub.

The station also airs weekly sports programming and Saturday afternoons, including regular coverage of Macclesfield FC and Congleton Town.

== Current Presenters ==
Andy Clewes - Weekday Breakfast

Daz Antrobus - Afternoon Show

Mike Peters - Saturday Daytime Show

Jade Worsley - Saturday Breakfast

Dave Phillips - Sunday Brunch

Neil Davis - Silk Sport
