= 2BR =

Former radio station in Lancashire, England

- Clayton-le-Moors; England
- Broadcast area: East and Central Lancashire
- Frequencies: FM: 96.3 MHz; 99.8 MHz; 106.5 MHz; 107.0 MHz; DAB: 12A

Programming
- Format: Adult Contemporary

Ownership
- Owner: Global

History
- First air date: 25 July 2000
- Last air date: 29 March 2019

Two Boroughs Radio (known on air as 2BR) was an Independent Local Radio station serving East and Central Lancashire, England. It was owned and operated by Global and broadcast from studios at Clayton-le-Moors near Accrington.

2BR was merged with Capital Manchester and relaunched as part of the Capital radio network on 8 April 2019.

== History ==
2BR logo used until May 2016

2BR launched on 25 July 2000, serving the Burnley, Pendle and Hyndburn areas from studios at the Lomeshaye Industrial Estate in Nelson with its transmitter located on Pendle Hill in Newchurch in Pendle, near Fence.

A common misunderstanding is that the station's name originally referred to the "BB" postcodes of Burnley, Pendle & Hyndburn. This is incorrect. 2BR simply stood for Two Boroughs Radio. Whilst the name 'Two Boroughs Radio - 2BR' was used on the three trial broadcasts (1997 and 1998), 'Two Boroughs Radio' was dropped upon the full-time launch.

Broadcasting stations in the United Kingdom do not use callsigns, but as "2" is a prefix assigned by the ITU to callsigns in Great Britain, 2BR is technically a valid radio callsign.

In August 2010, the station moved to new studios at Clayton-le-Moors, co-locating with The Bee.

On 4 April 2016, UKRD announced 2BR would merge with sister Lancashire station The Bee as part of an expansion onto DAB across the county. The merged station carried the same 2BR programming and identity, alongside opt-outs for local news, traffic and advertising in the Burnley, Blackburn and Preston & Chorley areas. DAB transmissions, via the Lancashire multiplex, commenced on Wednesday 1 June 2016.

On 31 July 2018, Global Radio announced it had bought 2BR from UKRD. The sale followed Global's acquisition of another Lancashire station, The Bay, which relaunched as Heart North Lancashire & Cumbria in March 2018.

=== Closure ===
On 26 February 2019, Global confirmed 2BR would be relaunched as Capital Lancashire and form part of the Capital radio network on 8 April 2019. The station was merged with Capital's Manchester station.

2BR ceased broadcasting at 7pm on Friday 29 March 2019, with the station entering a transition period ahead of the full relaunch as Capital. The station's studios at Clayton-le-Moors closed with operations moving to Manchester. The final song played on the station was Unwritten by Natasha Bedingfield.

Local output for Greater Manchester and Lancashire consists of a three-hour regional Drivetime show on weekdays, alongside localised news bulletins, traffic updates and advertising. Separate local news services are produced for the Blackburn & Preston and Burnley & Pendle areas.

== Frequencies ==
- 96.3 FM: Chorley
- 99.8 FM: Burnley, Pendle and Hyndburn
- 106.5 FM: Preston and South Ribble
- 107 FM: Blackburn, Darwen and Accrington (Note: Both 99.8 FM and 107 FM work in Accrington.)
