= Dee Radio =

Chester's Dee Radio
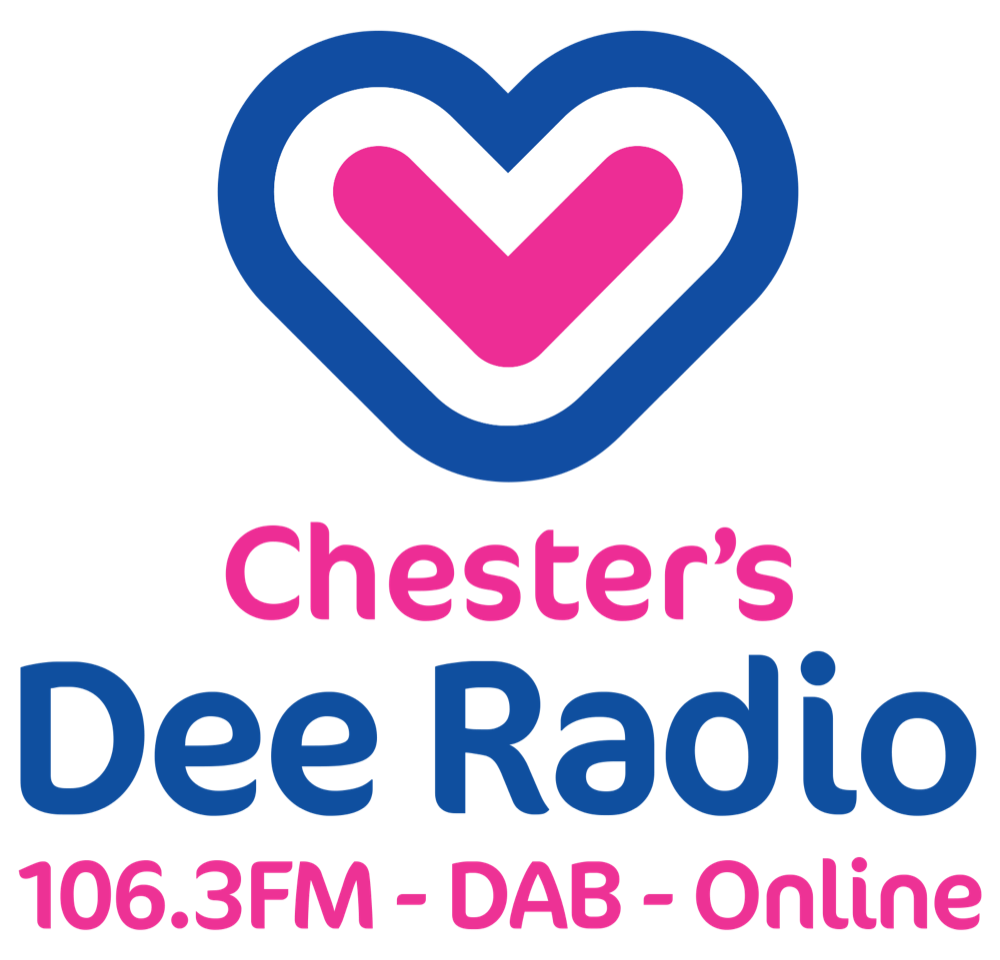
- Chester; England
- Broadcast area: Chester and Flintshire
- Frequencies: FM: 106.3 MHz; DAB: 10D
- RDS: DEERADIO
- Branding: Chester's Dee Radio

Programming
- Format: Adult contemporary

Ownership
- Owner: Dee Radio Group
- Sister stations: Cheshire's Silk Radio

History
- First air date: 1 March 2003; 23 years ago
- Former names: Dee 106.3

Technical information
- Transmitter coordinates: 53.1935°N 2.8799°W

Links
- Website: dee1063.com

Chester's Dee Radio is an Independent Local Radio station serving the city of Chester and surrounding areas. The station is independently and locally owned, and broadcasts from studios at the Riverside Innovation Centre.

As of March 2024, the station broadcasts to a weekly audience of 12,000, according to RAJAR.

== History ==
The station launched as Dee 106.3 on 1 March 2003 from its original studios at Chantry Court in Chester.

In June 2009, the station's owners purchased neighbouring local radio station Silk 106.9, based in Macclesfield.

In March 2013, Dee 106.3 launched a second station, Dee on DAB, on the MuxCo DAB digital radio multiplex serving North East Wales and West Cheshire. The service later became a full-time simulcast of the main Dee Radio service.

In January 2020, the station rebranded as Dee Radio, de-emphasising its FM frequency and reflecting its availability across both FM and digital radio platforms.

== Programming ==
All of Dee Radio's programming is produced and broadcast from its Chester studios. Live programming airs from 6am to 7pm on weekdays, 8am to 6pm on Saturdays and 10am to 2pm on Sundays. Other output is voice-tracked or automated.

The station's presenters include Gavin Matthews, Dave Phillips, Steve Lord, Ruth Anne Pollard, Darren Antrobus and Shane Pinnington.

=== News and sport ===
Dee Radio broadcasts hourly local news bulletins produced by Radio News Hub from 6am to 6pm on weekdays and 10am to 2pm at weekends. National bulletins from Sky News Radio are carried hourly at other times.

The station airs weekly sports programming on Friday evenings and Saturday afternoons, including regular coverage of Chester FC.

== Transmission ==
Dee Radio broadcasts on 106.3 MHz from a transmission site atop the Steam Mill building in Chester city centre.

The station is also available on DAB digital radio via the MuxCo North East Wales and West Cheshire multiplex, which is part-owned by Dee Radio.
