= Rathergood Radio =

Coordinates: 54.5275°N 1.5608°W

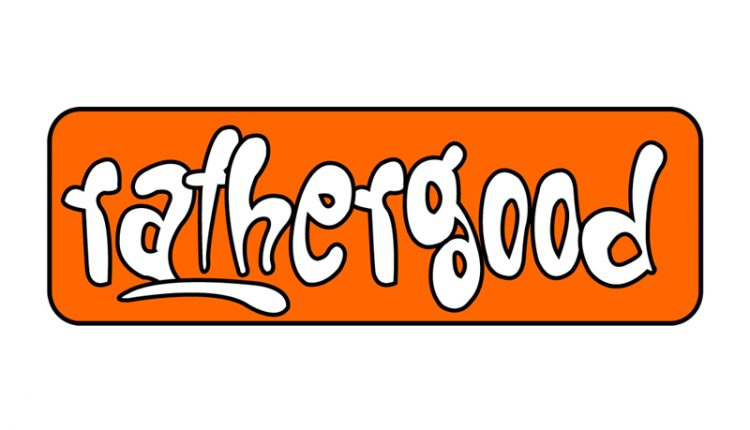
- London; England

Programming
- Format: Adult contemporary music

Ownership
- Owner: View TV Group

History
- First air date: 2017
- Last air date: July 2019

Links
- Website: Rathergood Radio

Rathergood Radio, formerly known as Star Radio (in County Durham), was an Independent Local Radio station. It formerly broadcast in Darlington, County Durham, North Yorkshire and surrounding areas on FM. The County Durham licences were owned and operated by UKRD Group until 31 March 2017, when it was purchased and later rebranded by View TV Group.

In July 2019, Helius Media Group purchased the FM licences from View TV Group and rebranded the County Durham frequencies as Durham Radio & Alpha Radio but sold them to Nation Broadcasting in March 2020 who merged them with neighbouring station Sun FM.

== History ==
Following UKRD's takeover of The Local Radio Company, Star Radio North East was launched on 2 November 2009 by merging Alpha 103.2, Minster Northallerton and Durham FM into one station. Originally, the Alpha name was to be used making the stations Alpha Northallerton and Alpha Durham.

On 29 March 2017, UKRD announced that it would hand back the Star Radio licences to the regulator Ofcom and cease broadcasting two days after that. It also asked Ofcom to transfer the Northallerton licence to sister station Minster FM. Ofcom Confirmed the transfer of the Northallerton licence to Minster on 4 April 2017.

On 31 March 2017, UKRD's chief executive officer William Rogers confirmed a deal had been reached with View TV to secure the future of the station effective immediately. It rebranded on 1 August.

In March 2018, Rathergood Radio was found in breach of its licence by Ofcom for failing to broadcast from two of its FM transmitters between 7 December 2017 and 8 February 2018. Telecommunications company Arqiva, which provided transmission services to the station's licence holder Alpha Radio Ltd, said it had terminated the services due to "nonpayment of fees".

In April 2019, it was announced that Helius Media Group had acquired the Durham Radio & Alpha Radio names and would be launching two new local stations on 1 July 2019 using the Rathergood Radio frequencies. Durham Radio was broadcast on the 102.8 & 106.8 frequencies to Durham City and the surrounding areas and Alpha Radio was broadcast on the 102.6 & 103.2 frequencies to Darlington and surrounding areas. The stations were sold to Nation Broadcasting in March 2020 and were merged with neighbouring station Sun FM which broadcasts from studios in Sunderland.

== Programming ==
All output was automated.

=== News ===
National bulletins from Radio News Hub were carried every hour.
