= Smooth Lake District =

Coordinates: 54.3453°N 2.7769°W

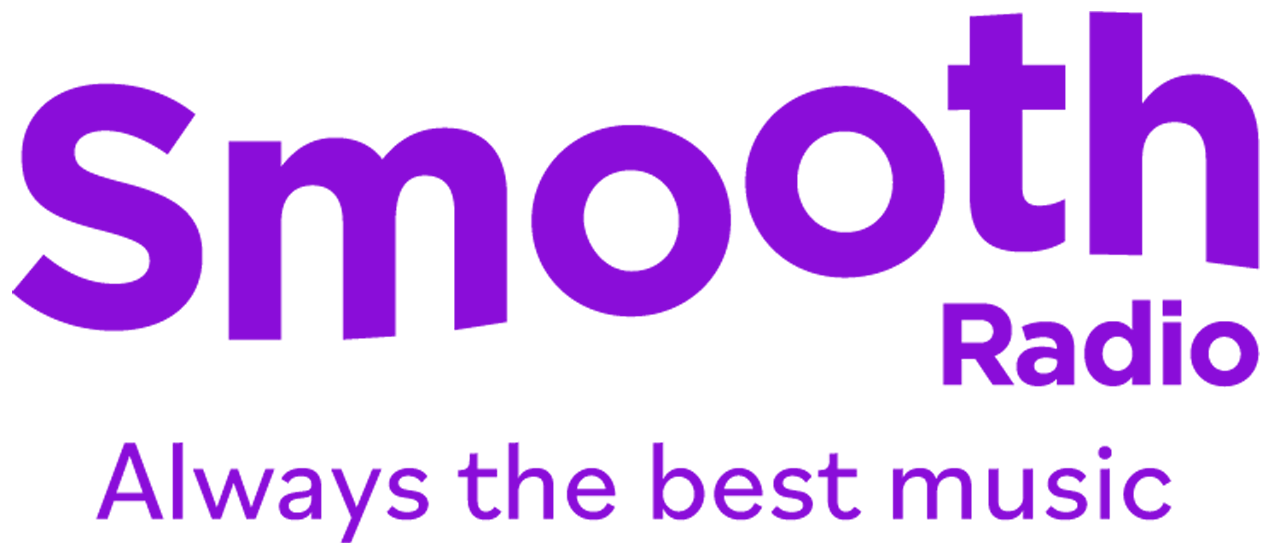

Manchester; England
- Broadcast area: Lake District
- Frequencies: FM: 100.1 MHz (Kendal and Morecambe); 100.8 MHz (Windermere); 101.4 MHz (Keswick); DAB+: 11B (Morecambe Bay)
- Branding: Always The Best Music for the Lake District

Programming
- Format: Soft Adult Contemporary
- Network: Smooth Radio

Ownership
- Owner: Global
- Sister stations: Heart North West

History
- First air date: 27 October 2001
- Former names: Lakeland Radio

Links
- Website: Smooth Lake District

Smooth Lake District is an Independent Local Radio station for the Lakes, owned and operated by Global and part of the Smooth network.

== Overview ==
Logo used to 2018

Originally known as Lakeland Radio, the station broadcasts from transmitters at Kendal on 100.1 MHz, the western side of Lake Windermere on 100.8 MHz and Keswick Forest on 101.4 MHz.

Originally licensed to serve the South Lakes, the station's coverage area extended northwards on 23 April 2013 when it began broadcasting to Keswick and surrounding villages. Part of the service area overlaps with that of its Lancaster-based sister station The Bay (now Heart North Lancashire & Cumbria).

On 20 November 2017, CN Group announced Lakeland Radio would be sold to Global along with sister station The Bay - the sale was finalised by 1 December 2017. Global later announced Lakeland Radio would become part of the Smooth network.

The Lakeland Radio brand and programming were phased out in February 2018 and following a transition period, the station was relaunched as Smooth Lake District at 6 am on Monday 5 March 2018.

In September 2019, the station closed its Kendal studios and co-located with sister station Smooth North West in Manchester.

Following OFCOM's decision to relax local content obligations from commercial radio, Smooth's local Drivetime and weekend shows were replaced by network programming from London. Local news bulletins, traffic updates, and advertising were retained, alongside the station's Lake District breakfast show.

== Programming ==
As of 22 February 2025, programming is broadcast and produced from Global's London headquarters, or studios in Birmingham and Manchester.

=== News ===
Global's Newsroom broadcasts hourly local news bulletins from 6 am to 7 pm on weekdays and from 6 am to 12 pm on weekends.

National news updates air hourly from Global's London headquarters at all other times.

== See also ==
- Heart North Lancashire & Cumbria
