= Radio Wave 96.5 =

Radio Wave
- Blackpool; England
- Broadcast area: The Fylde
- Frequency: FM: 96.5 MHz

History
- First air date: 25 May 1992
- Last air date: 31 August 2020

Technical information
- Transmitter coordinates: 53.8159°N 3.0551°W

Radio Wave was an Independent Local Radio station serving Blackpool, The Fylde and surrounding areas. It broadcast from studios in the Layton area of Blackpool via a specially constructed transmitter atop Blackpool Tower.

Following its sale to Bauer Radio, the station was closed and merged with the Greatest Hits Radio network in September 2020.

== History ==
Radio Wave logo used from 2010 to 2016.

In the late 1980s, local businessman John Barnett started lobbying the radio industry regulator for a distinct Independent Local Radio (ILR) licence for the Blackpool and Fylde area. The licence was awarded in 1992 and Radio Wave began broadcasting at 7 am on 25 May 1992 with an introduction from its founder. The first presenter on-air was Neil Sexton and the first record played was "The Best" by Tina Turner. The official launch took place on a specially erected stage in front of a live audience on the promenade by Blackpool Tower and featured Les Dawson and Derek Batey, together with other local celebrities.

In its first year of broadcasting, the station won a Sony Radio Academy Awards Gold Award and was commended in the Local Station of the Year category.

In August 1996, Radio Wave was confirmed by RAJAR as the most listened-to radio station in the area, ahead of fourteen other stations which were available including BBC Radio 1, which had half the number of listeners locally. In 2000, John Barnett received an MBE for services to radio broadcasting. He later became the station's chairman.

== Transmission area ==
Radio Wave's studios were based on Mowbray Drive in the Layton area of Blackpool, with the signal coming from the top of the Blackpool Tower.

The station could be heard from Fleetwood in the Wyre district, in the northwest corner of the Fylde, Preston to the east and Southport, 14.8 miles (23.8 km) west-southwest of Preston. Radio Wave could also be received as far north as Shap Fell in Cumbria.

== Station rebrand ==
On 8 February 2019, Radio Wave and the Wireless Group's local radio stations were sold to Bauer Radio. The sale was ratified in March 2020 following an inquiry by the Competition and Markets Authority.

On 27 May 2020, it was announced that Radio Wave will join Bauer's Greatest Hits Radio network.

On 13 July 2020, local programming outside weekday breakfast was replaced by networked output from the GHR network, with Radio Wave retaining its own branding.

On 1 September 2020, the station merged with six local stations in the North West of England and North Wales, forming Greatest Hits Radio North West. The station's local breakfast show was dropped and replaced by a regional afternoon show. Localised news bulletins, traffic updates and advertising are retained as opt-outs. The station's Blackpool studios were closed.
