= Alpha Radio Darlington =

Alpha Radio
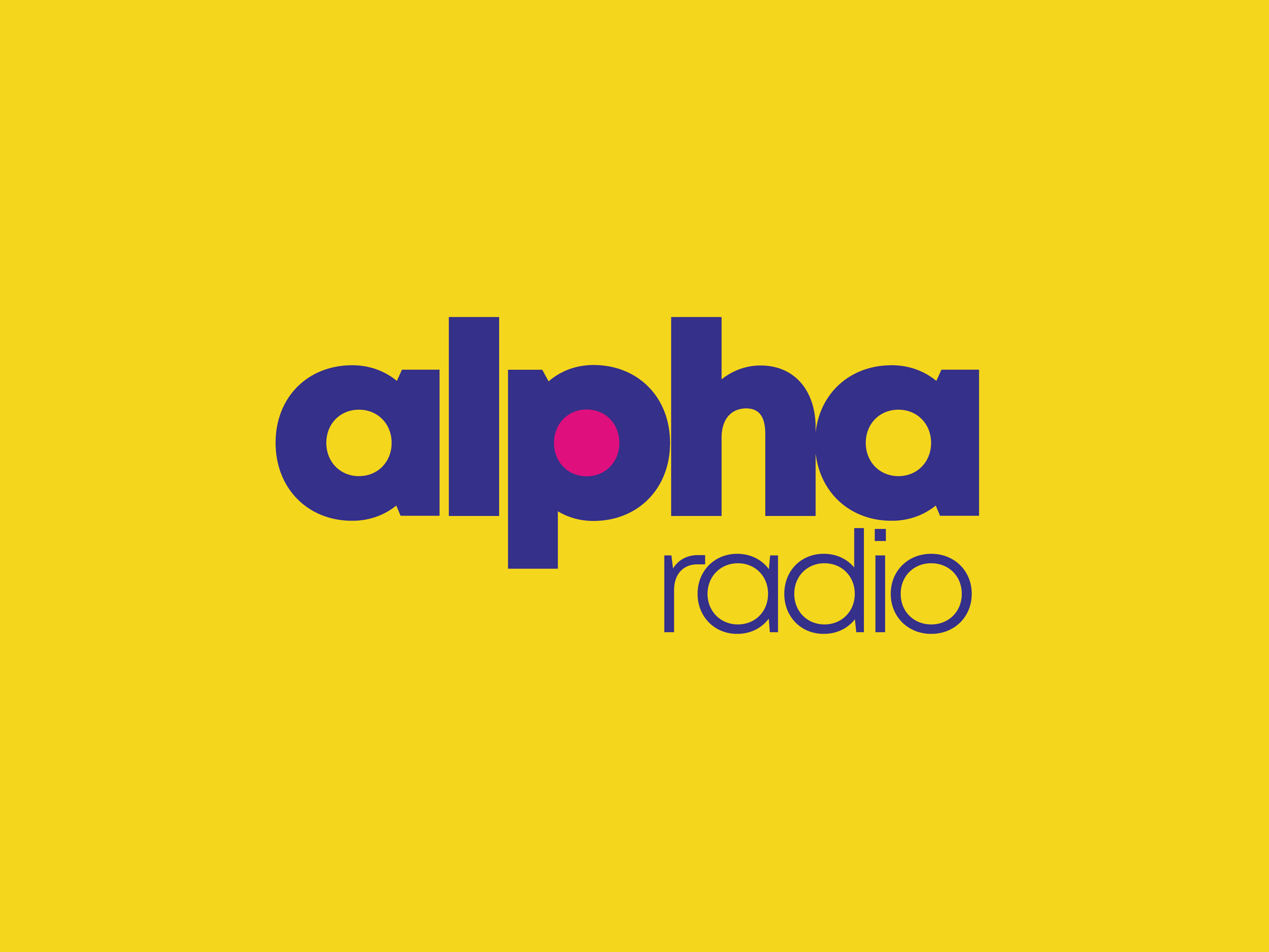

Programming
- Format: Contemporary

History
- First air date: 30 November 1995 (1st); 1 July 2019 (2nd); 10 July 2023 (3rd)
- Last air date: 2009 (1st); 2020 (2nd)
- Former names: Original: A1 FM; Alpha 103.2; Current: Darlo Radio

Links
- Website: https://alpharadio.co.uk

Alpha Radio was a community radio station based in Darlington, England, for south County Durham. The brand has been bought and used multiple times, the current third iteration was formerly known as Darlo Radio. The original version was merged into Star Radio, the second into Sun FM.

== History ==
When launched in 1995 as A1FM, Alpha was owned by Radio Investments Ltd while First Radio Sales

In 2009, Alpha was joined by neighbouring station Minster Northallerton to share the studio complex in a cost-cutting exercise. To make further savings, both Alpha and Minster Northallerton, along with Durham FM were rebranded as Star Radio North East which meant all three stations lost their heritage names and only produced a daily breakfast show. Since June 2010, output has been networked across all frequencies, although commercial breaks were still unique to the three areas.

=== Imaging ===
In its history, Alpha 103.2/ Alpha FM/ Alpha Radio had many jingle packages and imaging updates. In 2002, The Local Radio Group introduced Bespoke Music Jingles to its group of stations. This then launched an iconic sung logo for Alpha 103.2. Alpha had four main jingle packages from Bespoke. They were introduced in 2001, 2003, 2007 and 2009. During 2003/ 2006, Alpha lost its jingles in favour of imaging when the Music:Fun:Life streamline was introduced. The main station Voice overs for Alpha throughout its life were, Emma Clarke, Chris Marsden, Jeff Davies and Greg Marsden.

The last ever Alpha Jingles were by sung radio jingles made by Bespoke Music. but had the name tweaked when the station changed names from Alpha 103.2 to Alpha Radio.Most recently the station had sung radio jingles made by Bespoke Music. The main station imaging for Alpha was designed and produced in house via the TLRC from Minster FM in York which was made as a generic package for the TLRC group and sent to all local station within the portfolio to be edited into 'local ID's' however later, the imaging was produced in Darlington's Woodland Road studio's via various producers such as Chris Hakin, Craig Bailey, Dan Callum and Dave Lee.

== Notable presenters ==
- Joel Ross
- Paul Smith OBE
