= Heart North Lancashire & Cumbria =

Coordinates: 54.0542°N 2.8069°W

Manchester; England
- Broadcast area: North Lancashire and South Cumbria
- Frequencies: FM: 96.9 Preston; 102.3 Windermere; 103.2 Kendal; DAB+: 11B (Morecambe Bay)

Programming
- Format: Hot AC

Ownership
- Owner: Global
- Sister stations: Smooth Lake District

History
- First air date: 1 March 1993
- Last air date: 31 May 2019

Links
- Website: Heart North Lancashire & Cumbria

Heart North Lancashire & Cumbria (formerly The Bay) was an Independent Local Radio station owned and operated by Global Radio as part of the Heart network. It broadcast to north Lancashire and south Cumbria from studios in Lancaster.

== History ==
=== The Bay ===
The station's original name, The Bay, derived from the sand banks of Morecambe Bay, above which the main 96.9 MHz transmitter is located. Relay transmitters are located near the Lake District towns of Windermere (102.3 MHz) and Kendal (103.2 MHz), near the A684.

The station served a potential audience of around 292,000 people, including the key centres of Barrow-in-Furness, Kendal, Lancaster, Morecambe and Windermere, where the service area overlaps with sister station Smooth Lake District.

Under previous owners, The Bay was nominated for and won several industry awards, including the Station of the Year at the 2010 Arqiva Commercial Radio Awards, and more recently, Arqiva's Breakfast Show of the Year in 2012.

=== Sale and rebrand ===
On 20 November 2017, CN Group announced The Bay would be sold to Global along with sister station Lakeland Radio - the sale was finalised by 1 December 2017. Global later announced The Bay would join the Heart network.

The Bay's brand and programming was phased out during February 2018 and following a transition period, the station was relaunched as Heart North Lancashire and Cumbria at 6am on Monday 5 March 2018.

=== Closure ===
On 26 February 2019, Global announced the station would be merged with Heart North West. From 3 June 2019, local output will consist of a three-hour regional Drivetime show on weekdays, alongside local news bulletins, traffic updates and advertising.

Heart North Lancashire & Cumbria's studios in Lancaster closed with operations moving to Manchester. Local breakfast and weekend shows were replaced with network programming from London. The station ceased local programming on 31 May 2019.

== See also ==
- Smooth Lake District
