= Minster FM =

- England
- Broadcast area: York and parts of North Yorkshire
- Frequencies: FM: 104.7, 102.3, 103.5 MHz; DAB: 10C

Programming
- Format: Adult Contemporary

Ownership
- Owner: Bauer

History
- First air date: 4 July 1992
- Last air date: 31 August 2020

Technical information
- Transmitter coordinates: 54.047°N 0.787°W

Minster FM was an Independent Local Radio station serving York and the surrounding areas such as Selby, Tadcaster, Thirsk, Northallerton and Goole. The station closed on 31 August 2020 and its frequency is now a relay of Greatest Hits Radio Yorkshire. It broadcast on 104.7 FM from the Acklam Wold transmitter, near Leavening, on the Yorkshire Wolds.

== History ==
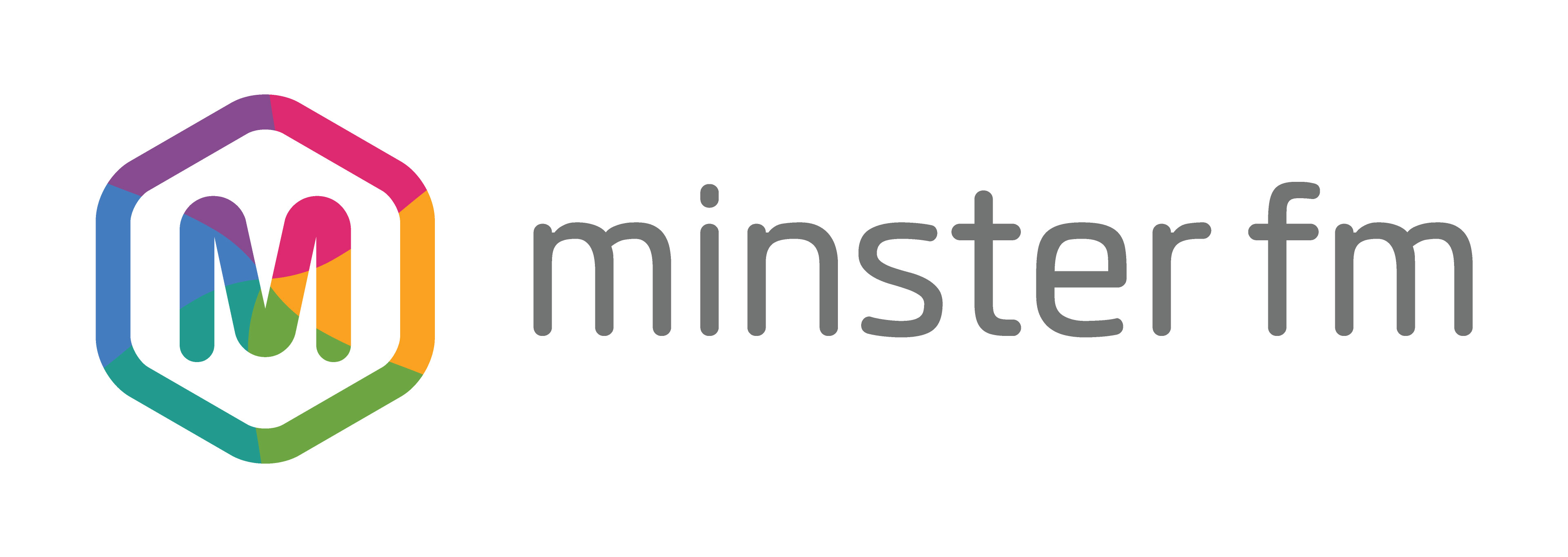
Former logo used until Rebranding in 2020

Minster FM, named after York Minster, began broadcasting at 6 am on Saturday 4 July 1992. This was nine years to the day after BBC Radio York launched. The first presenter to air was Daragh Corcoran and the first song played was 'Saturday in the Park' by Chicago. Minster FM launched with a live locally presented schedule 24 hours a day. This continued until the launch of Yorkshire Coast Radio in November 1993 when programmes between 10 pm and 6 am were broadcast (or networked) on both stations.

In 1996, the station added a transmitter to cover the Thirsk and Northallerton area using a signal on 102.3 FM from Calvert's Carpets in Thirsk.

In 2005, station owners The Local Radio Company (TLRC) secured a specific licence for the area and launched Minster Northallerton on that frequency.

TLRC was later taken over by UKRD, and in 2009, the new owners merged this station with its stations based in Darlington and Durham to form Star Radio.

On 17 December 2014, Minster FM started broadcasting on DAB digital radio, under the name More Minster. It is broadcast on the North Yorkshire DAB multiplex from various locations within Yorkshire, including Bilsdale, Acklam Wold, Hildebrand Barracks and Oliver's Mount.

More Minster carried Minster FM programmes in the morning and through the day. During the evening, the DAB schedule differed from the FM version, broadcasting its own dedicated programming.

In 2017, UKRD announced that it would give back Star Radio licences to the regulator Ofcom in return for the transfer of the Northallerton licence to Minster FM. This was confirmed on 4 April 2017. 102.3 FM once again began broadcasting Minster FM along with a transmitter covering the Northallerton area on 103.5 FM.

UKRD local radio stations were bought by Bauer Radio in 2019, along with many other local radio stations in England. On 1 September 2020 it became a part of Bauer Radio's Greatest Hits Radio network with music from the 70s, 80s & 90s – this type of music having been phased in since its takeover.

In January 2021, a number of former presenters and staff from Minster FM launched a new digital radio station for the region, YorkMix Radio.

== Awards ==
In 2009, Minster FM was one of three stations to be nominated for The Arqiva Station of the Year (under 300,000 listeners in TSA), but lost out to Lincs FM 102.2.

In 2017, drivetime presenter Harry Whittaker received a nomination for 'Best New Show' at the UK ARIAS and 'Best Entertainment Programming' at the 2018 O2 media Awards

In 2019, Minster FM won the 'Charitable Business Award' at the Yorkshire Choice Awards 2019.

== Programming before rebrand ==
The majority of Minster FM's programmings were produced and broadcast from its York studios. Live presenter-led programming aired from 4 am to 10 pm on weekdays, 6 am to 8 pm on Saturdays and 6 am to 7 pm on Sundays, with automated non-stop music broadcast overnight. The sole syndicated programme on the station, produced by Salford-based Chris Country Radio, aired on Sunday evenings.

=== News ===
Minster FM broadcast hourly local news bulletins from 6 am to 6 pm on weekdays and from 8 am to 1 pm at weekends. On weekdays, headlines and sports bulletins were broadcast on the half-hour during breakfast and drivetime shows. At all other times, syndicated national bulletins from Sky News Radio were broadcast on the hour.

Originally, Minster FM's local news provision had been contracted out to Yorkshire Television's regional news service Calendar. However, it was later brought in-house.

== Notable former presenters ==
- Stephanie Hirst
- Roxanne Pallett
- Ryan Swain

== See also ==
- Greatest Hits Radio Yorkshire, which replaced Minster FM in September 2020
