= Greatest Hits Radio Bucks, Beds and Herts =

Coordinates: 51.8158°N 0.8138°W

- Aylesbury; United Kingdom
- Broadcast area: Aylesbury, Buckinghamshire, Bedfordshire and Hertfordshire
- Frequencies: FM: 96.2 MHz (Aylesbury) DAB: 10D (Herts, Beds & Bucks); Mobile; Online

Programming
- Language: English
- Format: Classic Hits
- Network: Greatest Hits Radio

Ownership
- Owner: Bauer Media Audio UK

History
- First air date: 15 April 1994
- Former names: Mix 96
- Former frequencies: 1548 kHz

Technical information
- Licensing authority: Ofcom

Links
- Website: Greatest Hits Radio Bucks, Beds and Herts

Greatest Hits Radio Bucks, Beds and Herts (formerly Mix 96) is an Independent Local Radio station, owned and operated by Bauer, which broadcasts to Buckinghamshire, Bedfordshire and Hertfordshire. It is part of the Greatest Hits Radio network.

It was formerly known as Mix 96 prior to a rebrand by Bauer in 2020.

== History ==
Former Logo

Mix 96 launched on 15 April 1994 broadcasting on 96.2FM, it was the first radio station to gain a permanent licence to serve Aylesbury and the surrounding towns including Thame, Princes Risborough, Tring and Leighton Buzzard. The launch slogan was 'Bucks Best Music' but the station later used the strapline "Bucks Best Mix of Music". The first song to be played on the radio station was 'Dancing Queen' by ABBA, played at 7:45am on the opening morning, 15 April 1994.

Originally an independent station, it was wholly owned by the local group Bucks Broadcasting Ltd. The original chairman of Mix 96 was Richard Morris-Adams, with Mark Flanagan serving as managing director, Erika Sorby-Firth as sales director, and Keri Jones as programme controller. In 1995, Sorby-Firth became managing director, a role she held until Bucks Broadcasting was sold to Radio Investments in 2001. The current managing director is Max Hailey, who returned to the station in 2013.

The group invested in a number of stations throughout the UK including The Bear 102, in Stratford-upon-Avon, 107.7 The Wolf in Wolverhampton, Arrow FM in Hastings and Surf 107 in Brighton.

Fox FM increased their shareholding in Bucks Broadcasting, and were themselves wholly acquired by Capital Radio plc, leading the company to become part of Capital until they were divested to Radio Investments (later known as The Local Radio Company).

The latest audience listening figures show that Mix 96 has a weekly reach of 34% (42,800).

It celebrated its 20th birthday on 15 April 2014.

On 27 May 2020 it was announced that Mix 96 would be closed and rebranded to Greatest Hits Radio from early September 2020.

A Facebook group and online petition to save Mix 96 was created by loyal listeners which even got raised as a talking point in the Houses Of Parliament.

On 1 February 2021 the previous presenters formed a new online radio station Bucks Radio which reverted to the previous mix of old and new songs with local news, weather and travel. Bucks Radio launched on DAB across the county in June 2024

== Present format ==
Its playlist is a now a syndicated feed from Greatest Hits Radio playing music from the 70's, 80's and 90's. The previous format of Mix 96 had played a mixture of old classics and new music.
