= Geography of Scotland =

- Continent: Europe
- Region: British Isles
- Area
  - Total: 80,231 km^{2} (30,977 sq mi)
  - Land: 97%
  - Water: 3%
- Coastline: 11,796 km (7,330 mi)
- Borders: England; 154 km (96 mi)
- Highest point: Ben Nevis; 1,346 m (4,416 ft)
- Lowest point: Atlantic Ocean, 0 m
- Longest river: River Tay; 188 km (117 mi)
- Largest lake: Loch Lomond; 71.3 km^{2} (27.5 sq mi)
- Climate: Temperate, Subarctic, Tundra
- Terrain: mountains, hills, forest, bog, urban
- Natural resources: iron, zinc, potash, silica sand, coal, fish, timber, wildlife, petroleum, natural gas, hydropower
- Natural hazards: windstorms, floods
- Environmental issues: climate change, renewable energy, waste disposal and water pollution

The geography of Scotland is varied from rural lowlands to unspoilt uplands, and from large cities to sparsely inhabited islands. Located in Northern Europe, Scotland comprises the northern part of the island of Great Britain as well as 790 surrounding islands encompassing the major archipelagos of the Shetland Islands, Orkney Islands and the Inner and Outer Hebrides. The only land border is with England, which runs for 96 miles (154 kilometres) in a northeasternly direction from the Solway Firth in the west to the North Sea on the east coast. Separated by the North Channel, the island of Ireland lies 13 nautical miles (24 kilometres) from Mull of Kintyre on the Scottish mainland. Norway is located 190 nmi (350 km) northeast of Scotland across the North Sea. The Atlantic Ocean, which fringes the coastline of western and northern Scotland and its islands, influences the temperate, maritime climate of the country.

Scotland contains the majority of mountainous terrain in the UK. The topography of Scotland is distinguished by the Highland Boundary Fault which traverses the Scottish mainland from Helensburgh to Stonehaven. The faultline separates two distinctively different physiographic regions; namely the Highlands to the north and west and the Lowlands to the south and east. The more rugged Highland region contains the majority of Scotland's mountainous terrain, including the highest peak, Ben Nevis.

Lowland areas, in the southern part of Scotland, are less mountainous and home to most of the population, especially the narrow waist of land between the Firth of Clyde and the Firth of Forth known as the Central Belt. Glasgow is the largest city in Scotland, although Edinburgh is the capital and political centre of the country. While the Lowlands are less elevated, upland and mountainous terrain is located across the Southern Uplands.

Natural resources such as coal, iron and zinc contributed significantly to the industrial growth of Scotland during the 19th and early 20th centuries. Today, energy is a major component of Scotland's economy. Whilst Scotland is a large producer of petroleum, the production potential of renewable energy has emerged as an important economic and environmental issue in recent years.

== Geology and morphology ==
The land area of Scotland is 30,090 square miles (77,900 km^{2}), 32% of the area of the United Kingdom (UK). The mainland of Scotland has 6,160 miles (9,910 km) of coastline.

The morphology of Scotland was formed by the action of tectonic plates, and subsequent erosion arising from glaciation. The major division of Scotland is the Highland Boundary Fault, which separates the land into 'highland' to the north and west, and 'lowland' to the south and east. The Scottish Highlands are largely mountainous, and form the highest ground in the UK: they are bisected by the Great Glen into the Grampian Mountains to the southeast and the Northwest Highlands. The Scottish Lowlands can be further subdivided into the Southern Uplands, an area of rolling farmland and high moorland, and the lowland farmland of the Central Belt and eastern Scotland.

Scotland has an incomparable variety of geology for an area of its size.

The oldest rocks of Scotland are the Lewisian gneisses, which were formed in the Precambrian period, up to 3 billion years ago. They are among the oldest rocks in the world. During the Precambrian, the Torridonian sandstones and the Moine were also laid down. Further sedimentary deposits were formed through the Cambrian period, some of which metamorphosed into the Dalradian series. The area which would become Scotland was at this time close to the south pole.

During the Silurian period (439–409 Ma), the area which became Scotland was part of the continent of Laurentia. Across the Iapetus Ocean to the south, was the continent of Baltica. The two continents gradually collided, joining Scotland to the area which would become England and Europe. This event is known as the Caledonian Orogeny, and the Highland Boundary Fault marks this stitching together of continents. Silurian rocks form the Southern Uplands of Scotland, which was pushed up from the seabed during the collision. The highlands were also pushed up as a result of this collision, and may have been as high as the modern-day Alps at this time. The Old Red Sandstones were laid down in low-lying areas during this period. Volcanic activity occurred across Scotland as a result of the collision of the tectonic plates, with volcanoes in southern Scotland, and magma chambers in the north, which today form the granite mountains such as the Cairngorms.

During the Carboniferous period (363–290 Ma), Scotland lay close to the equator. Several changes in sea level occurred during this time. The coal deposits of Lanarkshire, and further sedimentary deposits, date from this time. More volcanic activity formed Arthur's Seat in Edinburgh, among other hills. By the Triassic, Scotland was a desert, the origin of large sandstone outcrops of the southwest. Although large deposits of Cretaceous rocks would have been laid down over Scotland, these have not survived erosion, as have the chalks of England.

By the Tertiary period, the tectonic plates were again moving, separating into modern-day North America and Europe with the creation of the Atlantic Ocean. The split occurred to the west of Scotland, leaving a chain of former volcanic sites through the Hebrides, including Skye and St. Kilda. This was the last period of rock formation in Scotland.

== Physical geography ==
=== Main points ===
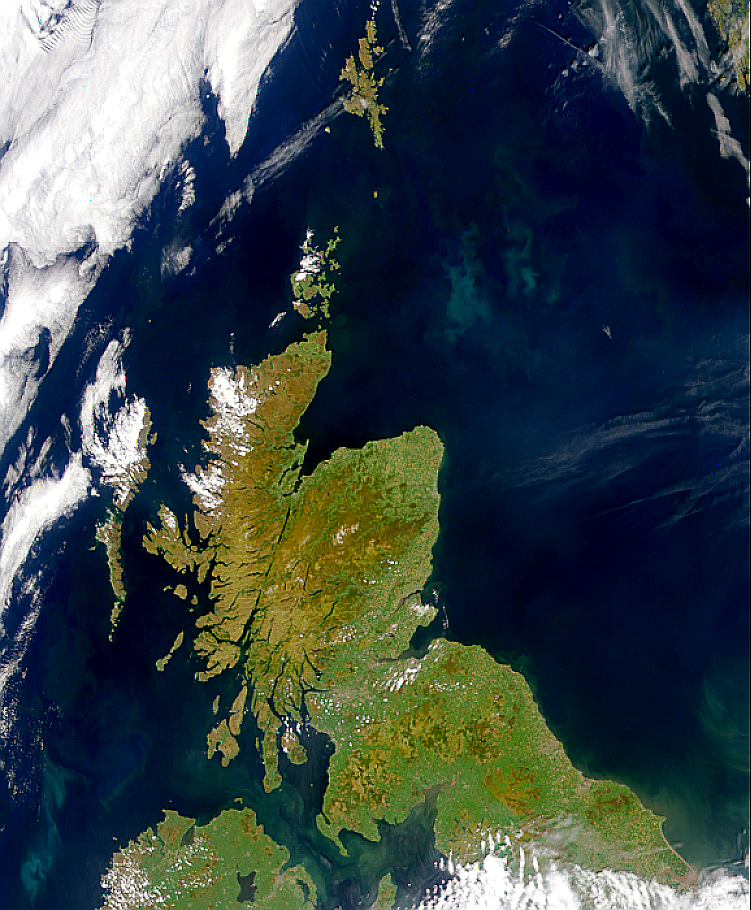
Scotland viewed from space

The main points of the Scottish mainland are:

- North: Easter Head, Dunnet Head, Caithness
- East: Keith Inch, Peterhead, Aberdeenshire
- South: Mull of Galloway, Dumfries and Galloway
- West: Corrachadh Mòr, Ardnamurchan (headland), Lochaber

It is often yet incorrectly stated that John o' Groats is the most northerly point of mainland Scotland. The pre-Union phrase "John o' Groats to Maidenkirk" was the Scottish equivalent of the British Land's End to John o' Groats.

The extreme points of Scotland, including outlying islands, are:

- North: Out Stack, north of Unst, Shetland Islands
- East: Bound Skerry, Out Skerries, Shetland Islands
- South: Mull of Galloway, Dumfries and Galloway
- West: Either Rockall (annexed in 1972 to the former Inverness-shire), the international status of which is disputed, or Soay, St. Kilda, Western Isles

The geographical centre of Scotland lies a few miles from the village of Newtonmore in Badenoch, far to the north of the modern population heartlands. The geographical centre of the mainland alone lies near the peak of Schiehallion.

=== Land use ===
The total land area of Scotland is 8,023,947 hectares. Grasses and rough grazing account for 67% of the land area, forest and woodland 17%, urban development 8%, crops and fallow 7%, and other agricultural land accounts for 2%.

=== Topography, mountains and hills ===
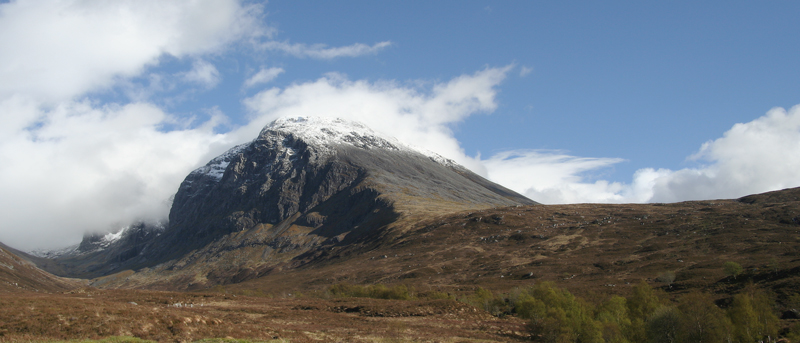
Ben Nevis is the highest peak in Great Britain.

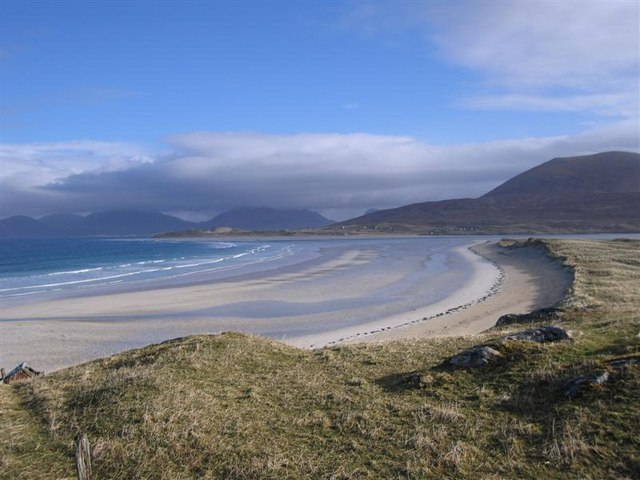
Large parts of the Scottish coastline are dune pasture, such as here at Traigh Seilebost on the Isle of Harris.

30A map of British Isles EEZs and surrounding nations. Internal UK borders are represented by thin lines.Scotland's EEZ is highlighted in blue.

Scotland contains the most mountainous terrain in Great Britain. Much of the highest uplands lie to the north and west of the Highland Boundary Fault in the Northwest Highlands and Grampian ranges. The jagged Cuillin, on the Isle of Skye, represents a major mountain range that is not located on the Scottish mainland. Located at the western end of the Grampian Mountains, at an elevation of 1,345 m (4,413 ft), Ben Nevis is the highest mountain in Scotland and Great Britain. Ben Macdui and Braeriach are, respectively, the second and third tallest peaks in Scotland. Both are located in the Cairngorms, a mountain range in the eastern Highlands which is the highest upland area in Britain.

In the south of Scotland lie the Southern Uplands, a vast, rolling mountain chain that is less rugged and more forested than the Highlands. Shorter than the Highlands, the tallest mountain in the range is Merrick, at 843 m (2,766 ft).

There are ranges of gentler, rolling hills even in the central lowlands of Scotland. Such ranges include the Ochil Hills, near Stirling, the Campsie Fells outside Glasgow, and the Lomond Hills in Fife.

Mountains in Scotland are categorised by their height. Peaks over 3,000 ft (914.4 m) are known as Munros. There are 282 Munros in Scotland, all within the Highlands. Corbetts are peaks with an altitude of between 2,500 and 3,000 ft (762.0 and 914.4 m), with a relative height of at least 500 ft (152.4 m) . The classification of peaks in Scotland is kept under periodic review by the Scottish Mountaineering Club.

=== Coastline ===
Mainland Scotland has 6,160 miles (9,910 km) of coastline. Including the numerous islands, this increases to some 11,602 miles (18,672 km). The west coast in particular is heavily indented, with long promontories separated by fjordlike sea lochs. The east coast is more regular, with a series of large estuarine inlets, or firths, and long sandy beaches, for example at Aberdeen. Parts of the Scottish coastline consist of a machair formation, a dune pasture land formed as sea levels subsided.

The east coast has several significant estuaries and is home to nature reserves including the Ythan Estuary and Fowlsheugh, both of which have been designated as Important Bird Areas.

Firths around the Scottish coast include the Solway Firth, Firth of Clyde, and Firth of Lorne on the west coast, and the Cromarty Firth, Moray Firth, Firth of Tay, and Firth of Forth on the east coast. The Pentland Firth is not an inlet, but the strait that separates the Orkney Isles from the mainland.

Major sea lochs include Loch Fyne, Loch Long, Loch Ryan, Loch Linnhe, Loch Torridon, Loch Ewe and, on the Isle of Lewis, Loch Seaforth.

=== Islands ===
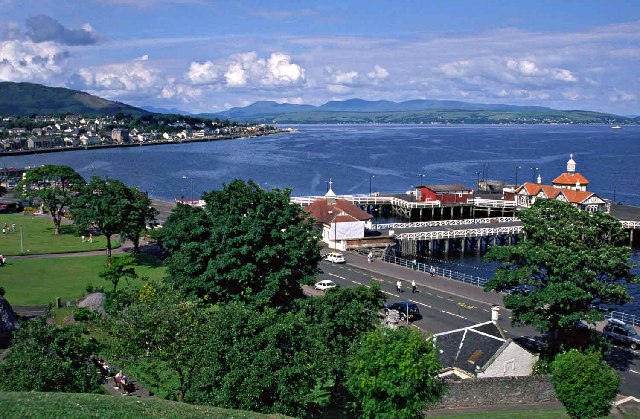
Dunoon in Argyll and Bute

Scotland has over 900 islands, over 100 of which are inhabited. Most of the islands are located off the northern and western coast of the country. The northern and western islands of Scotland can be found in three main groups: Shetland, Orkney and the Hebrides which can be divided into the Inner Hebrides and the Outer Hebrides. Shetland and Orkney, together with Fair Isle and Stroma are referred to as the Northern Isles. With a total land area of 860 square miles (2,200 km^{2}) Lewis and Harris (referred to as two islands but actually just one) is the largest Scottish island. The smallest island in Scotland is Easdale, which is located in the Inner Hebrides. It covers just 0.08 square miles (0.2 square kilometers) and has a population of about 50.

Many of these offshore islands are swept by strong tides, and the Corryvreckan tide race between Scarba and Jura is one of the largest whirlpools in the world. Other strong tides are to be found in the Pentland Firth between mainland Scotland and Orkney, and the Grey Dog between Scarba and Lunga. There are also numerous clusters of islands in the Firth of Forth and the Firth of Clyde and in freshwater lochs such as Loch Lomond and Loch Maree. Outlying islands include St Kilda and Rockall the status of which is disputed.

Scotland's islands have a varied topography. Mull, Skye and Arran are noted for their mountainous terrain, whilst Tiree and Coll are flat or low lying. Striking topographical differences can be seen within island groups themselves; in Orkney, the Island of Hoy is hillier and more rugged than surrounding islands and Harris is distinctive in being more mountainous than the islands of Lewis, North Uist, South Uist and Barra, in the Outer Hebrides. Islay's terrain is gentle and rolling; however, its neighbour Jura is mountainous and rugged. Rùm and Eigg display jagged terrain; nearby Canna and Muck are flatter.

=== Rivers ===
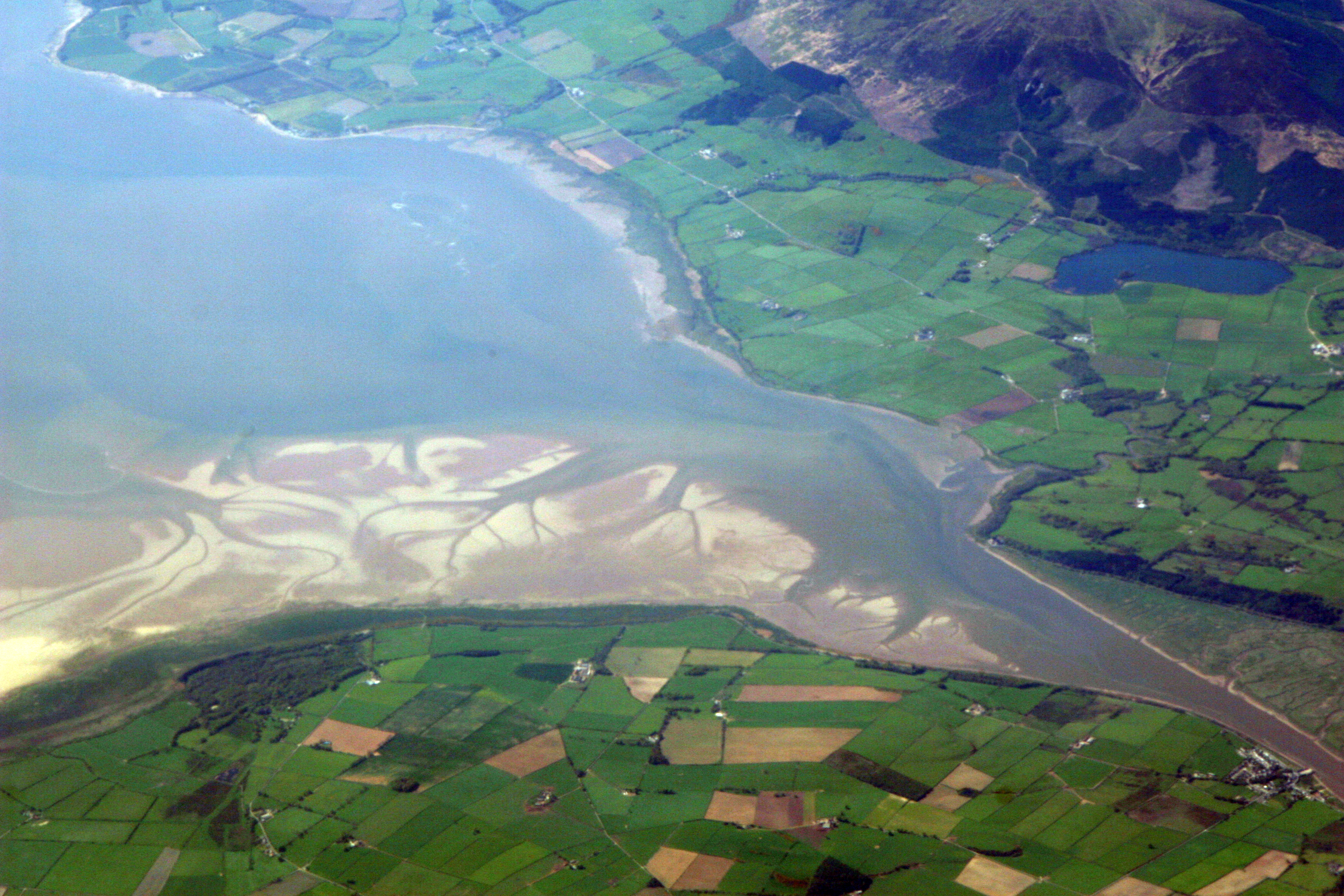
The estuary of the River Nith emptying into the Solway Firth to the south of Dumfries.

The ten major rivers of Scotland, in order of length, are:

1. River Tay 120 mi (190 km)
2. River Spey 107 mi (172 km)
3. River Clyde 106 mi (171 km)
4. River Tweed 97 mi (156 km)
5. River Dee 85 mi (137 km)
6. River Don 82 mi (132 km)
7. River Forth 65 mi (105 km)
8. River Findhorn 63 mi (101 km)
9. River Deveron 61 mi (98 km)
10. River Annan 50 mi (80 km)

The watershed between river systems flowing west to the Atlantic Ocean and east into the North Sea is 745 mi (1,199 km) long.

=== Lochs ===
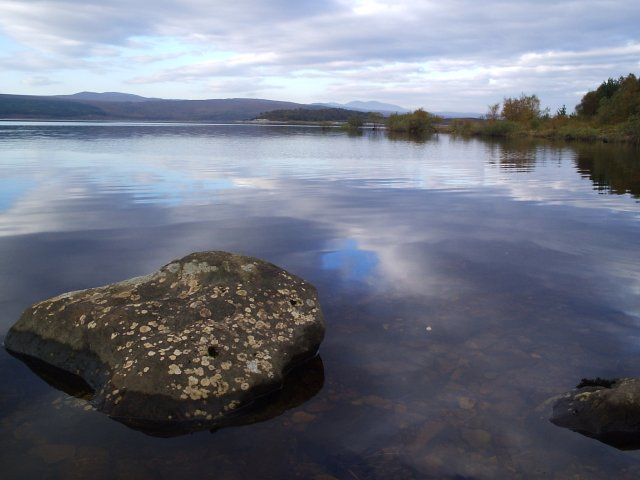
Loch Shin is one of many freshwater bodies in Scotland.

Fresh water bodies in Scotland are known as lochs, with the exception of the Lake of Menteith and one or two-man-made "lakes". 90% of the standing fresh water volume of Great Britain lies within Scotland. Loch Lomond is the largest freshwater body in Britain by area, although with a capacity of 1.78 cubic miles (7.4 km^{3}) Loch Ness is the most voluminous. The water in Loch Ness is nearly double that of all the lakes of England and Wales combined, and is by volume the largest lake in the UK and Ireland.

1. Loch Lomond 27.5 sq mi (71 km^{2})
2. Loch Ness 22.0 sq mi (57 km^{2})
3. Loch Awe 15.0 sq mi (39 km^{2})
4. Loch Maree 11.0 sq mi (28 km^{2})
5. Loch Morar 10.3 sq mi (27 km^{2})
6. Loch Tay 10.2 sq mi (26 km^{2})
7. Loch Shin 8.7 sq mi (23 km^{2})
8. Loch Shiel 7.6 sq mi (20 km^{2})
9. Loch Rannoch 7.4 sq mi (19 km^{2})
10. Loch Ericht 7.2 sq mi (19 km^{2})

=== Distances to other countries ===
Scotland's only land border is with England, and runs for approximately 60 miles (100 kilometres) between the basin of the River Tweed on the east coast and the Solway Firth in the west. The Atlantic Ocean borders the west coast and the North Sea is to the east. The island of Ireland lies only 12 nautical miles (22 kilometres) from the southwestern peninsula of Kintyre; Norway is 190 nmi (350 km) to the east; the Faroes, 170 nmi (310 km) to the north; and Iceland, 460 nmi (850 km) to the northwest.

== Climate ==
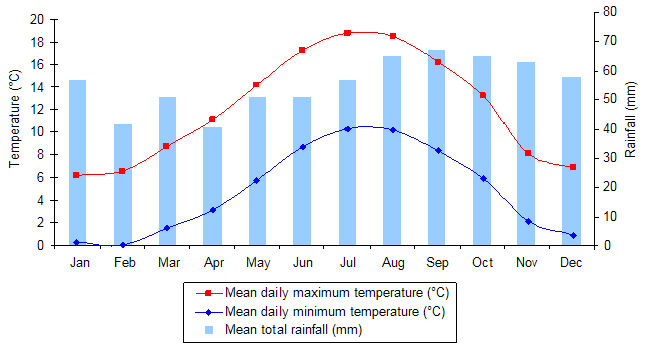
Climate graph for Edinburgh. Mild temperatures and evenly distributed rainfall, throughout the year, are characteristic of Scotland's temperate, maritime climate.

The climate of Scotland is temperate and very changeable, but rarely extreme. Scotland is warmed by the North Atlantic Drift and given the northerly location of the country, experiences much milder conditions than areas on similar latitudes, such as Labrador in Canada—where icebergs are a common feature in winter.

Average temperatures are lower than in the rest of Great Britain, with the coldest ever UK temperature of −27.2 °C (−17.0 °F) recorded at Braemar in the Grampian Mountains, on 10 January 1982 and also at Altnaharra, Highland, on 30 December 1995. Winter maxima average 5.0 to 5.7 °C (41.0 to 42.3 °F), with summer maxima averaging 14.9 to 16.9 °C (58.8 to 62.4 °F). Western coastal areas of Scotland are warmer than the east and inland areas, due to the influence of the Atlantic currents, and the colder surface temperatures of the North Sea; however, during rare hot spells, the west is cooler than the east. The highest temperature recorded was 34.8 °C (94.6 °F) at Charterhall in the Scottish Borders on 19 July 2022. Areas such as Inverewe Garden in the northwest and the Logan Botanic Garden in the southwest have warm enough microclimates to support palm trees.

Rainfall totals vary widely across Scotland—the western highlands of Scotland are one of the wettest places in the UK with annual rainfall up to 4,577 mm (180.2 in). Due to the mountainous topography of the western Highlands, this type of precipitation is orographic in nature, with the warm, wet air forced to rise on contact with the mountainous coast, where it consequently, cools and condenses, forming clouds. In comparison, much of eastern Scotland receives less than 870 mm (34.3 in) annually; lying in the rain shadow of the western uplands. The town of Dunbar, east of Edinburgh, has an annual rainfall of merely 560.18 mm (22.05 in), less than Barcelona. Snowfall is less common in the lowlands, but becomes more common with altitude. Parts of the Highlands have an average of 36 to 60 snow days per year, while some western coastal areas have between 0 and 6 days with snow a year. Scotland's snowiest spot is the Cairngorm mountain range.

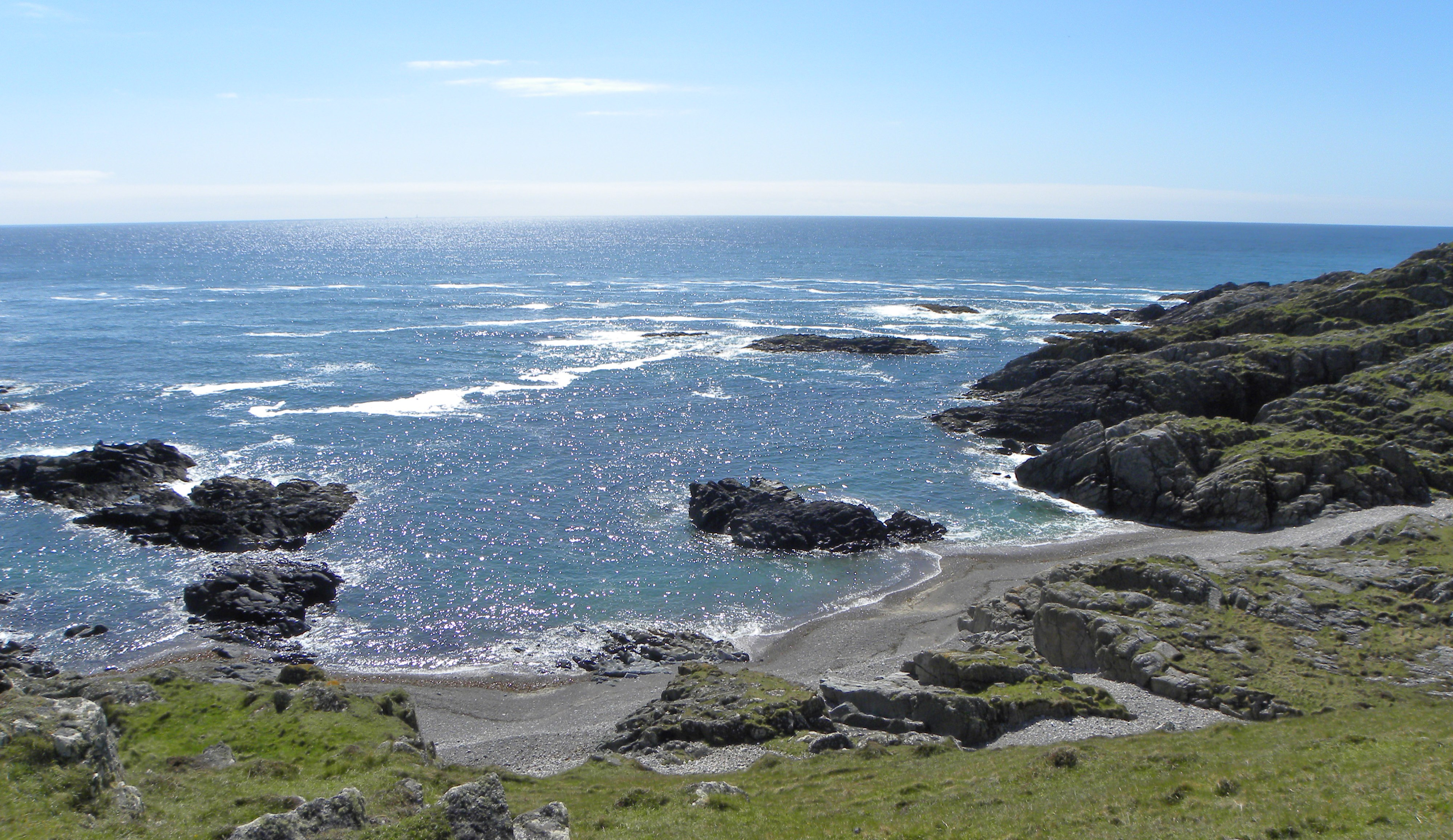
Sunshine on the coastline at Ceann a' Mhara near Tiree

The Hebridean island of Tiree received a total of 329 hours of sunshine in May 1946 and again in May 1975, the highest number of sunshine hours ever recorded in one month in Scotland. On the longest day of the year there is no complete darkness over the northern isles of Scotland. Lerwick, in Shetland, has four hours more daylight at midsummer than London, although this is reversed in midwinter. Annual average sunshine totals vary from as little as 711–1140 hours in the Highlands and the north-west up to 1471–1540 hours on the extreme eastern and south-western coasts.

In common with the rest of the UK and Ireland, wind prevails from the south-west, bringing warm, wet and unstable air from the Atlantic. The windiest areas of Scotland are in the north and west, with parts of the Outer Hebrides, Orkney and Shetland experiencing over 30 days with gales per year. Vigorous Atlantic depressions, also known as European windstorms, are a common feature of the autumn and winter in Scotland.

== Human geography ==
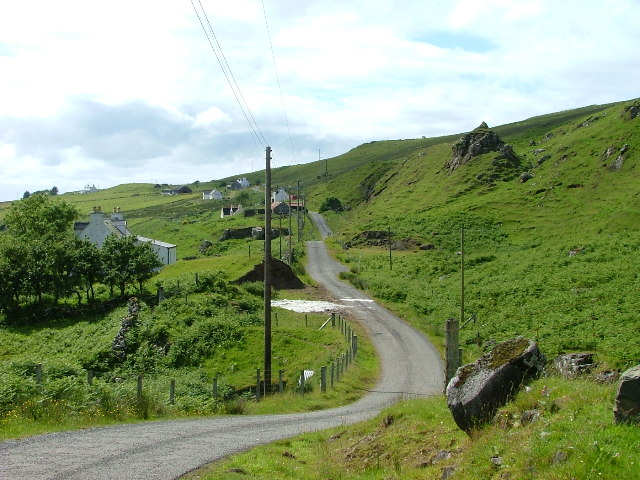
In northern and western areas, many people live in small crofting townships such as here on the Isle of Skye.

According to the General Register Office for Scotland, the total population of Scotland stood at 5,168,500 in June 2008, an increase of 2.1% since the census of April 2001. Scotland's share of the United Kingdom population has been declining in recent years and stands at just over 8.5% due to differential rates of growth in the home nations. However, an increasing birth rate and higher levels of inward migration to Scotland have reversed the decline and contributed to the recent population growth.

Compared with the rest of Europe, Scotland has a low population density at 65 people per square kilometre. However Scotland is a highly urbanised country, with 82% of the population living in settlements of 3,000 people or more. As a result, the majority of the population live in the Central Lowlands of Scotland, surrounding the chief cities of Glasgow and Edinburgh. Other concentrations of population include the northeast coast of Scotland – principally surrounding the city of Aberdeen and its environs – and around Inverness. With a population density of 8 people per square kilometre, the Highlands are the most sparsely populated part of the country, and one of the most sparsely populated areas in Europe. In these areas, the population is scattered in villages, small towns and isolated farmsteads or crofts.

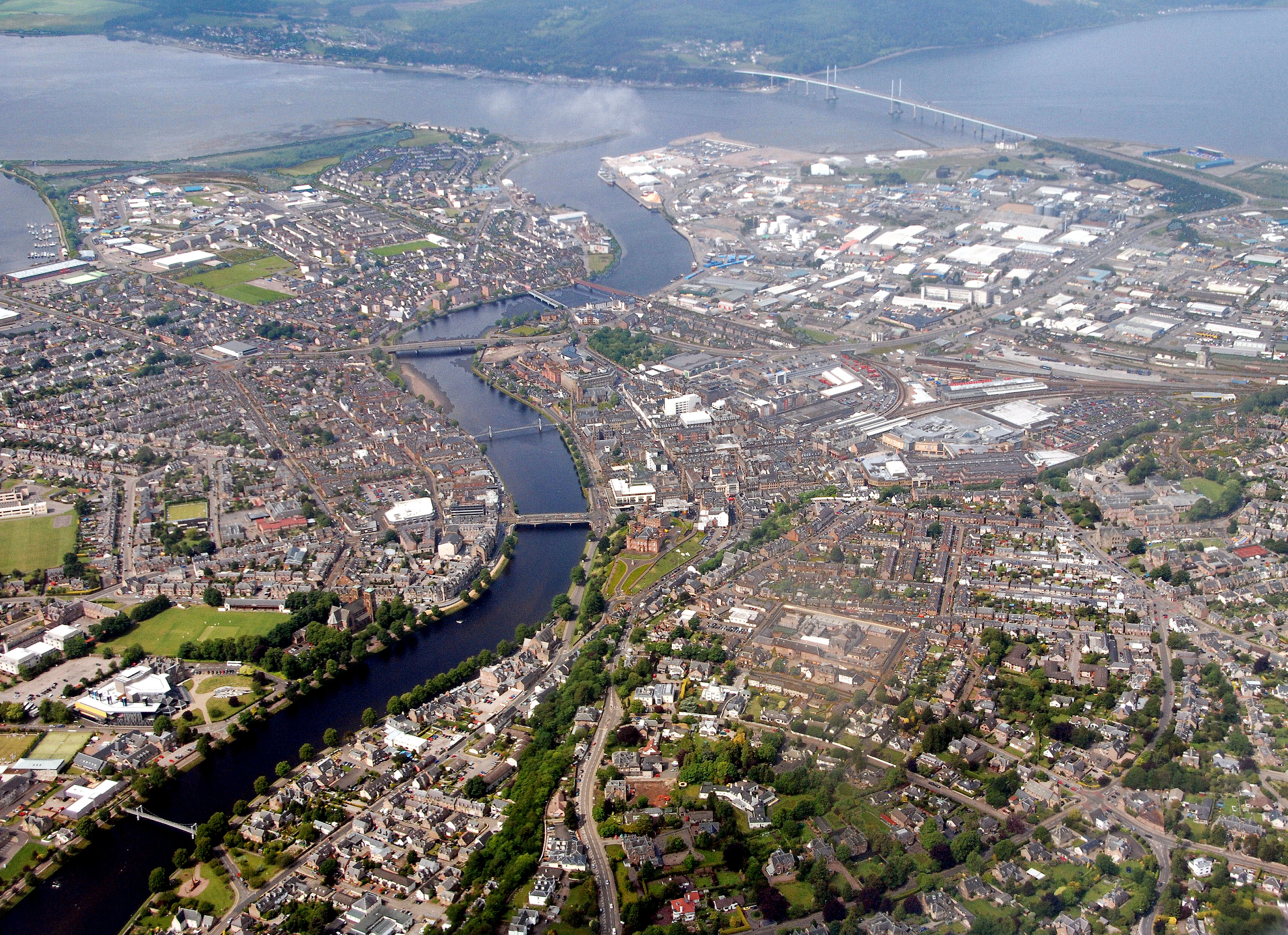
The city of Inverness is often regarded as the Capital of the Highlands

Nearly 100 of Scotland's islands are inhabited, the most populous being Lewis and Harris with 21,031 people resident in 2011, primarily concentrated around Stornoway, the only burgh of the Outer Hebrides. Other island populations range down to very low levels on certain small isles. Between 1991 and 2001, the total number of people living on Scotland's islands fell by 3%. Conversely, islands such as Tiree, Skye and Eigg experienced increases in their respective populations over the same decade.

There are eight cities in Scotland; Glasgow, Edinburgh, Aberdeen, Dundee, Inverness, Perth, Dunfermline and Stirling. The 2001 census identified Glasgow as being the largest city in Scotland, with a total population of 629,501, while the Scottish capital, Edinburgh had a population of 448,624, in the same year. Between 1991 and 2001, the populations of Edinburgh and Stirling grew by 2.9% and 6.5% respectively. Inverness experienced population growth of over 10% during the same period. At the same time, Glasgow, Dundee and Aberdeen all witnessed population decline. Aside from the cities, the greatest intra-census population growth was experienced in the local authorities of West Lothian, East Lothian, Aberdeenshire and Perth and Kinross. The Western Isles saw a 9.8% decrease in population between 1991 and 2001.

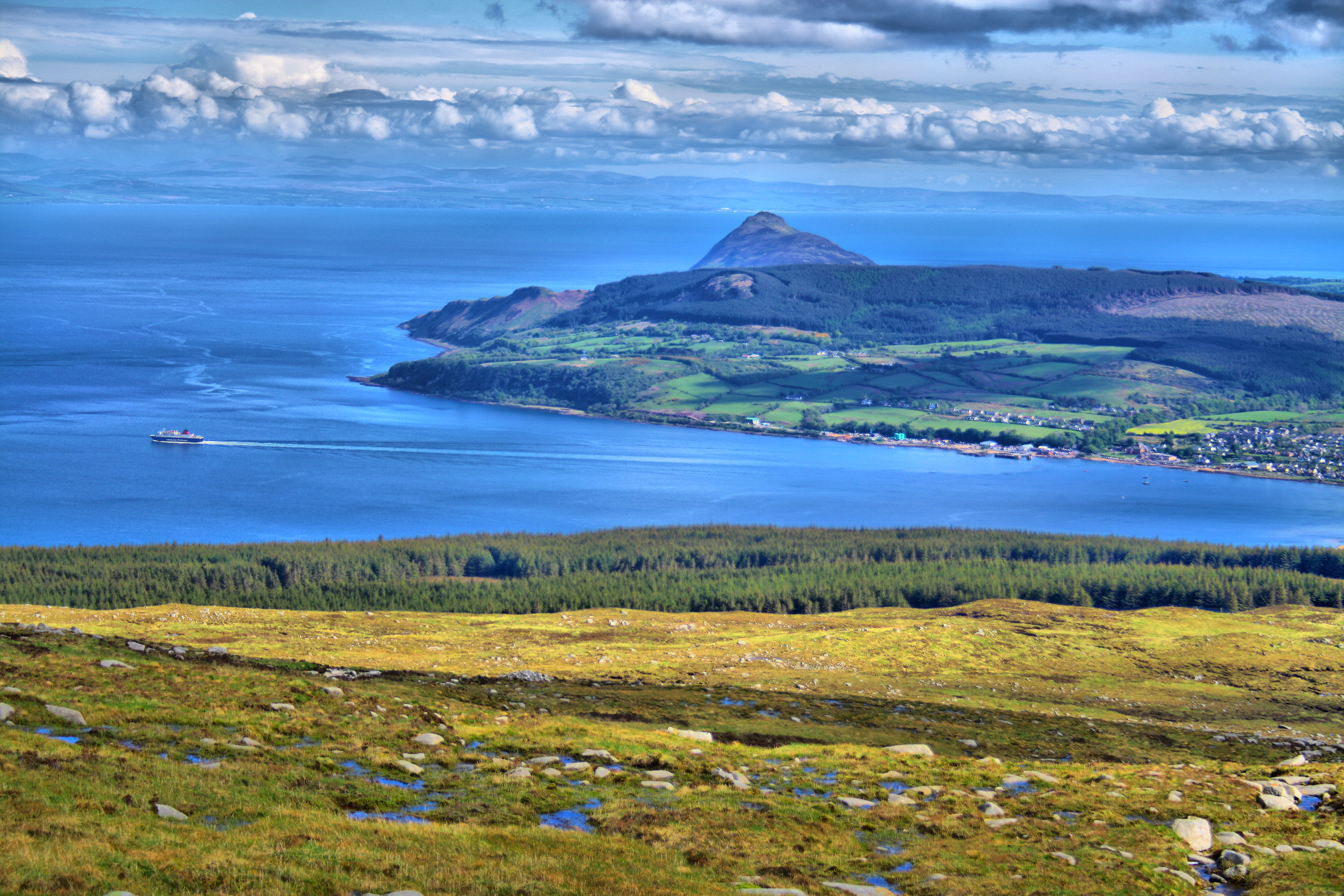
North Ayrshire's population is split across two areas; the main area on Scotland's west coast, and the Isle of Arran, separated from the mainland by the Firth of Clyde

Major towns in Scotland based on population include Paisley, East Kilbride, Kilmarnock, Livingston, Hamilton, Ayr, Cumbernauld, Irvine, Coatbridge and Wishaw. Paisley is commonly referred to as Scotland's largest town, having a population of 77,270 in 2020, a larger population than four Scottish cities – Dunfermline (54,990), Inverness (47,790), Perth (47,350) and Stirling (37,910). Towns such as Cumbernauld, East Kilbride and Stonehouse were largely created or expanded as new towns in order to combat the overpopulation and overspill in Scotland's largest cities – Glasgow and Edinburgh. Other new towns in Scotland include Glenrothes, Irvine and Livingston.

Glasgow City is the largest of the subdivisions of Scotland in terms of population, with a population of 622,820 in 2022. This is followed by City of Edinburgh with a population of 514,990 in 2022, Fife with a population of 371,340, North Lanarkshire with 340,930 and South Lanarkshire with 327,430. Despite being the largest subdivision in Scotland by area, Highland has a combined population of 235,710, making it the seventh largest subdivision in the country by population. Similarly, despite having a smaller area than its boundary neighbours East Ayrshire and South Ayrshire, North Ayrshire has the largest population of the former Ayrshire counties, with a population of 133,490 people across an area of 885km2. In contrast, East Ayrshire has a population of 120,390 people across 1,262km2, whilst South Ayrshire with an area of 1,222km2 has a population of 111,560.

== Political geography ==
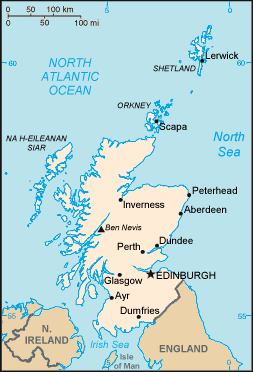
The territorial extent of Scotland has been relatively unchanged since the late 15th Century.

The territorial extent of Scotland is generally that established by the 1237 Treaty of York between Scotland and England and the 1266 Treaty of Perth between Scotland and Norway. Exceptions include: the Isle of Man, which having been lost to England in the 14th century is now a crown dependency outside of the United Kingdom, the acquisition of Orkney and Shetland from Norway in 1472, and the permanent recovery of Berwick by England in 1482. Originally an independent country, Scotland joined with England to form the Kingdom of Great Britain in 1707 with the Acts of Union.

Between 1889 and 1975 Scotland was divided into burghs and counties, which were replaced by regions and districts. Since 1996, for the purposes of local government, Scotland has been divided into 32 council areas.

Rockall, a small and uninhabitable rocky islet in the North Atlantic, was annexed by the UK in 1955 and later declared part of Scotland by the Island of Rockall Act 1972. However, the legality of this claim is disputed by the Republic of Ireland, Denmark and Iceland and it is probably unenforceable in international law.

As a country of the United Kingdom, Scotland is represented by Members of Parliament at the Parliament of the United Kingdom at Westminster, London. In 1997 a referendum was held, and the people of Scotland voted for the establishment of a devolved Scottish Parliament in Edinburgh. The new parliament has the power to govern the country on Scotland-specific matters and has a limited power to vary income tax. The United Kingdom Parliament retains responsibility for Scotland's defence, international relations and certain other areas. A Scottish independence referendum was held in September 2014, at which time independence was rejected.

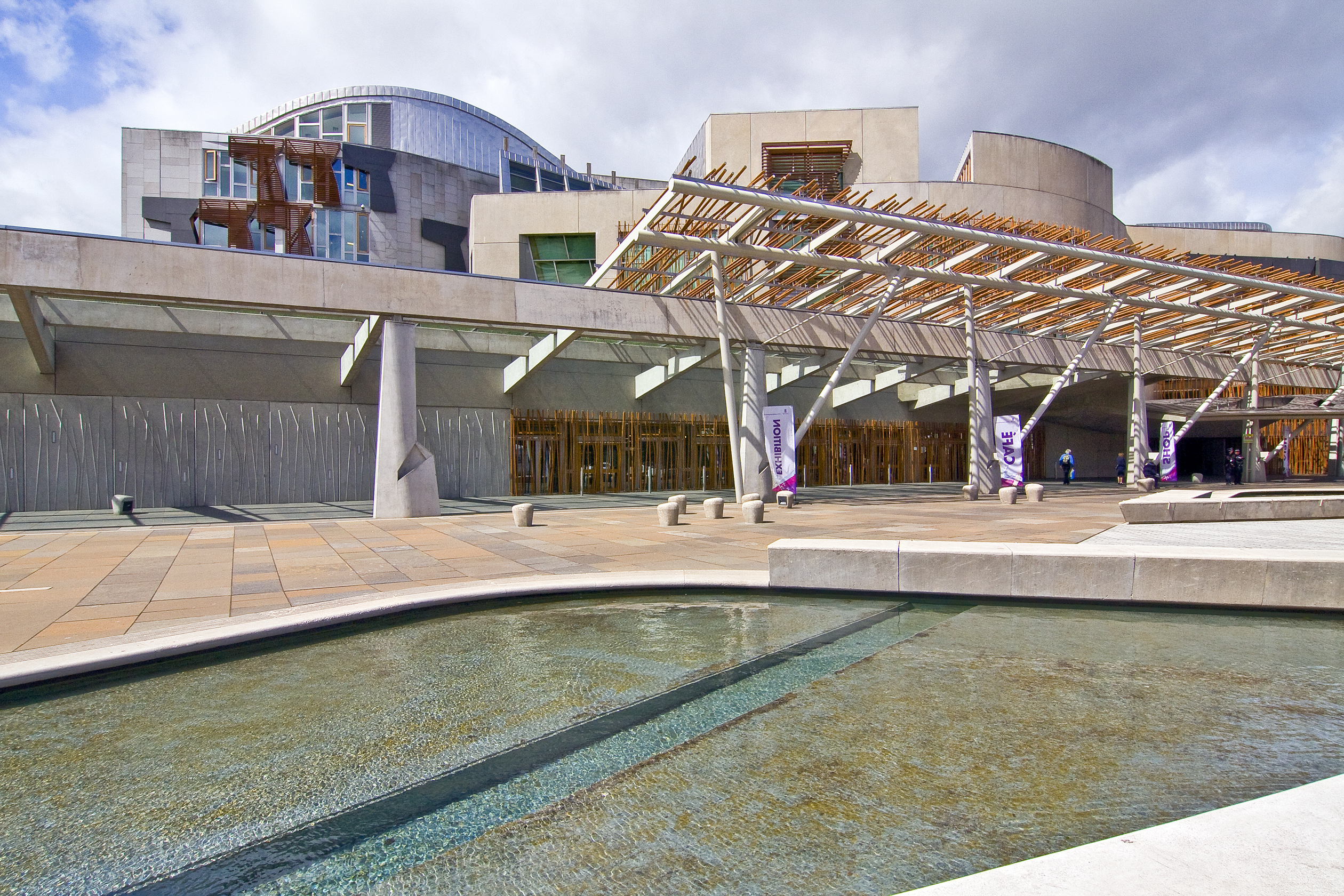
Scotland's capital city, Edinburgh, is home to the Scottish Government and Scottish Parliament

The latest election to the Scottish Parliament in 2021 concluded with the SNP winning a fourth consecutive term in government, winning 64 seats and an increase of one. The SNP gained Edinburgh Central, Ayr, and East Lothian as well as winning the largest share of the popular vote and the largest number of constituency seats in any Scottish Parliament election (62). The Greens won 8 seats, their best result to date at a Scottish Parliament election, while the Conservatives retained second place with 31 seats. Labour had its worst-ever result with 22 seats, and the lowest share of the vote in both Constituency & List votes for either Westminster or Holyrood since 1910. The Lib Dems won four seats, their worst showing at a Holyrood election to date.

The SNP and the Greens, both of which support Scottish independence, won 72 of the 129 seats in the parliament. Unionist parties achieved a slight majority of votes in constituency contests, whilst pro-independence parties did the same in the regional list votes. Voter turnout in the election reached 63.5%, the highest ever at a Scottish Parliament election. Following the election, the third Sturgeon government was formed, initially consisting of just the SNP but later including the appointment of Slater and Harvie as junior ministers, after the two parties negotiated a power-sharing agreement.

For centuries, a core aspect of Scotland's political geography has been the general divide between the Highlands and the Lowlands, a divide both physical and cultural. The physical geography of the divide (via the Highland Boundary Fault) and the political geography of the divide greatly overlap but are not identical. Despite any suggestiveness of the etymons "high" and "low", the division of Highlands and Lowlands does not thoroughly correspond either to elevation or to latitude in the sense of Northern Scotland and Southern Scotland being "upper" and "lower" (as north and south are often termed in various countries), and yet interestingly, the division does bear some noticeable degree of correspondence to both elevation and latitude, with upward and northward both tending toward stronger Highlander identity, more preservation of Gaelic versus Scots, and other political differentials (e.g., in previous centuries, degree of Unionism, degree of Jacobitism, and others).

== Economic geography ==
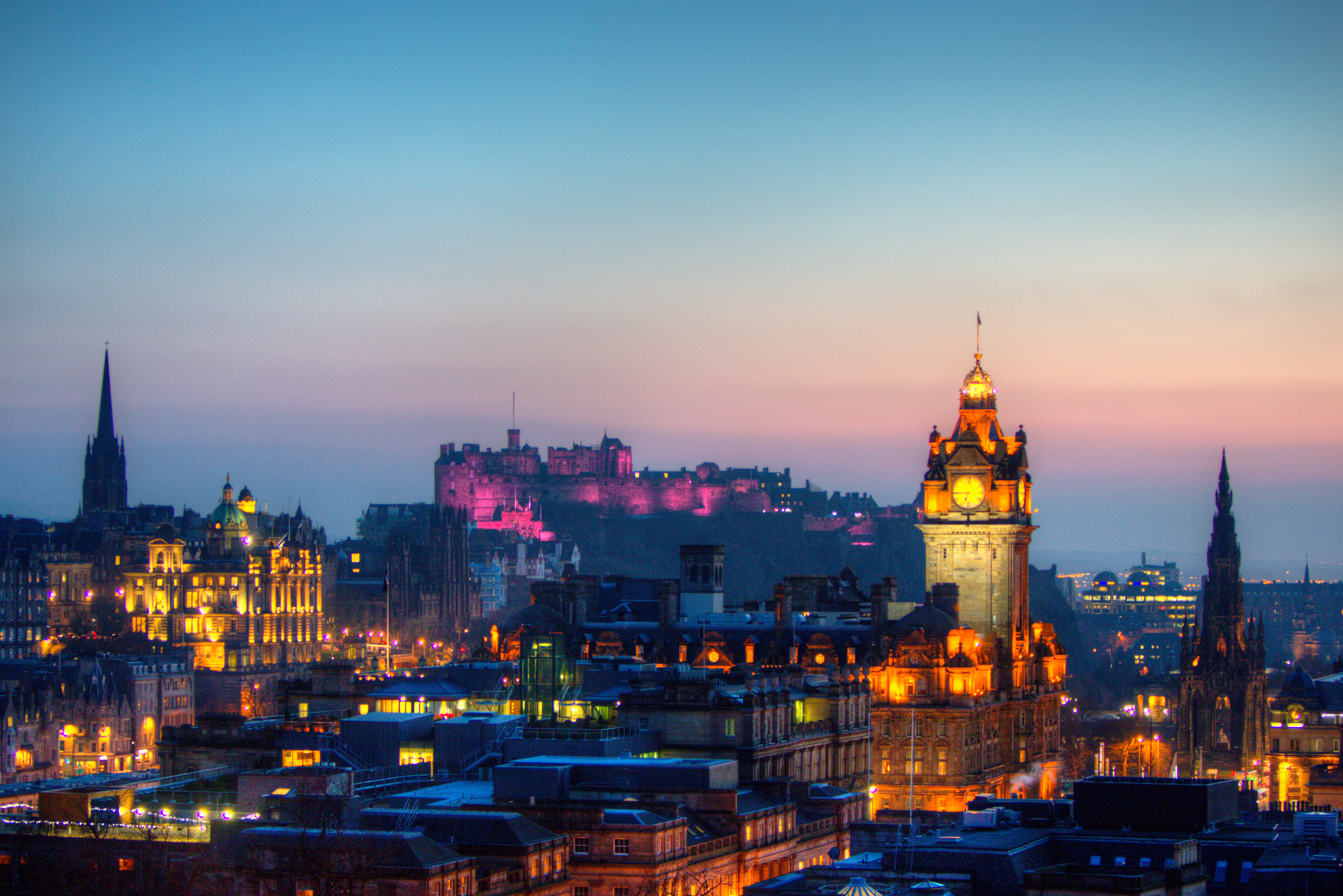
Edinburgh is the financial centre of Scotland. It ranked as 13th largest internationally and 4th largest in Europe in 2020.

The nominal gross domestic product (GDP) of Scotland in 2023 was estimated to be £211.7 billion (US$290 billion) including oil and gas extraction in Scottish waters. resulting a per capita GDP of approximately £38,622 per person. Major industries include banking and financial services, steelmaking, transport equipment manufacturing, oil and gas, agriculture, whisky distilling, and tourism.

The Economy of Glasgow encompasses the largest municipal and regional economy in Scotland. It is recognised as the largest contributor to the Scottish economy, and is the largest integrated economic region in Scotland and produces around a third of Scotland's output, business base, research power and employment. By Gross Domestic Product (GDP) figures, Glasgow City is the second highest amongst Scottish areas, behind, Edinburgh, and ahead of Aberdeen and Aberdeenshire. In 2021, Glasgow's GDP was estimated at just under 25.8 billion pounds, with an estimated £48billion in Gross Value Added (GVA) in 2021. Glasgow and Edinburgh are members of the Core Cities Group, a self-selected and self-financed collaborative advocacy group of large regional cities in the United Kingdom outside Greater London. The group was formed in 1995 and serves as a partnership of city councils.

Both the Economy of Glasgow and the Economy of Edinburgh contribute to the central belt of Scotland being one of the 20 largest urban regions in Europe. Based on Gross Value Added (GVA) and GVA per head figures in 2015, Glasgow's economy was the fifth largest amongst the cities of the United Kingdom.

The petroleum industry in Aberdeen, the third most populous city in Scotland, began in the mid-20th century following the discovery of significant oil deposits in the North Sea. Aberdeen has been characterised as the "oil capital" of Scotland, the United Kingdom, as well as Europe as a whole. Traditionally Aberdeen was home to fishing, textile mills, ship building and paper making. These industries have mostly gone and have been replaced with high technology developments in the electronics design and development industry, research in agriculture and fishing, and the oil industry which has been largely responsible for Aberdeen's economic boom in the last three decades.

== See also ==
- Royal Scottish Geographical Society
- Geography of the United Kingdom
- Geography of England
- Geography of Wales
- Geography of Ireland
