= Greatest Hits Radio Edinburgh, Lothians & Fife =

Coordinates: 55°57′28″N 3°11′12″W

Greatest Hits Radio Edinburgh, Lothians, Fife & Falkirk
- Edinburgh; United Kingdom
- Broadcast area: Edinburgh, The Lothians, Fife and Falkirk
- Frequency: DAB: 12D
- Branding: The Good Times Sound Like This; Across Edinburgh, the Lothians and Fife

Programming
- Format: Classic Hits
- Network: Greatest Hits Radio

Ownership
- Owner: Bauer Media Audio UK
- Sister stations: Forth 1

History
- First air date: 22 January 1975
- Former names: Radio Forth; Festival City Radio; Max AM; Forth AM; Forth 2

Links
- Website: GHR Edinburgh, Lothians, Fife & Falkirk

Greatest Hits Radio Edinburgh, Lothians & Fife (formerly Forth 2) is an Independent Local Radio station based in Edinburgh, Scotland, owned and operated by Bauer as part of the Greatest Hits Radio network. It broadcasts to Edinburgh, The Lothians, Fife and Falkirk.

As of December 2023, the station has a weekly audience of 108,000 listeners according to RAJAR.

== History ==
Entrance to Forth House in Forth Street, Edinburgh.

Forth 2 logo used from 2013 to 2015.

Radio Forth was launched on 22 January 1975 by its then managing director the late Richard Findlay. His opening speech included "This, for the very first time is Radio Forth". Steve Hamilton was the first on-air presenter, hosting the breakfast show.

In 1990, Forth was forced to create a new station on its AM frequency. Before this, Radio Forth was broadcast as a single station on both FM and AM frequencies. The FM station was renamed Radio Forth RFM, with Donny Hughes broadcasting the first Breakfast Show from the newly revamped Studio F in Forth House. The station became known as Forth FM in 1993. The new AM station became "Max AM" which was later renamed Forth AM to match its sister station.

Logo used from 2015 to 2023

In 2000, both stations were relaunched as 97.3 Forth One and 1548 Forth 2. Many changes occurred at this time including new presenters and a new jingles package. Forth 2 was redesigned as an adult contemporary music station while Forth One continued to play Top 40 songs for the 35s and under.

Radio Forth was owned by Scottish Radio Holdings until 23 June 2005 when British media group EMAP took over. In January 2008, EMAP Radio was sold to Bauer. The radio division was renamed Bauer Radio.

A new programming schedule was introduced on Monday 15 June 2009, consisting mostly of programming simulcast with Bauer's other AM stations in Scotland – Clyde 2 from Glasgow, Northsound 2 from Aberdeen, Tay 2 from Dundee and West Sound AM from Ayr. Forth 2 local programming was then restricted to breakfast shows, news bulletins and some specialist programming although the station also produced networked output on weekday evenings and Sunday mornings.

On 3 June 2013, station owners Bauer Radio announced Forth 2 would axe its remaining local programming with the weekday breakfast show, presented by Bob Malcolm, replaced with a networked show hosted by Robin Galloway from Monday 1 July 2013 across Bauer's network of AM stations in Scotland. The station became part of the Bauer City 2 network on Monday 5 January 2015.

On 17 June 2022, Forth 2 along with sister station Forth 1, moved into new studios in St James Quarter, Edinburgh, after leaving their long term home in Forth House.

On 12 November 2023, it was announced that the station would cease broadcasting on medium wave before the end of the year, but would continue on DAB.

== Programming ==
Much of the station's programming was produced in Greatest Hits Radio's studios in Dundee, Glasgow and Edinburgh.

Some output is produced from GHR's Birmingham, London and Manchester studios and broadcast on both networks in Scotland and England.

=== News ===
Forth 2 broadcast local news bulletins hourly from 6am to 7pm on weekdays and from 7am to 1pm at weekends. Headlines were broadcast on the half hour during weekday breakfast and drivetime shows, alongside sport and traffic bulletins.

National bulletins from Sky News Radio were carried overnight with bespoke networked Scottish bulletins at weekends, produced from Radio Clyde's newsroom in Clydebank.

== See also ==
- Radio Forth
- Forth 1
