= Economy of Glasgow =

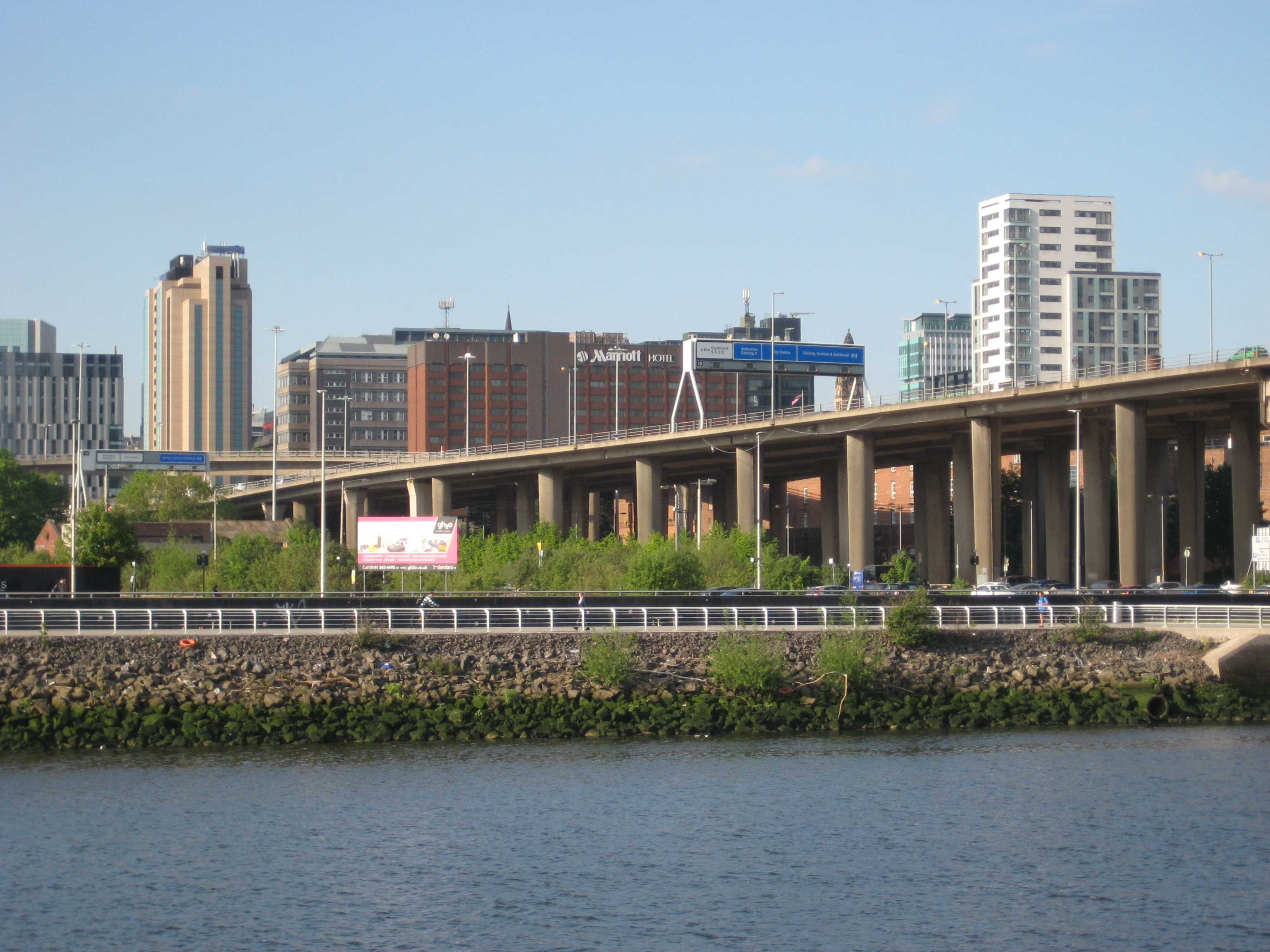
- A view towards the city centre of Glasgow, home to some of Scotland's largest industries and employers

Statistics
- Population: 650,300 (2024)
- GDP: £31.8 billion (2023)
- GDP per capita: £50,250 (2023)
- Labour force: 327,200 / 74.4% in employment (Jan 2023-Dec 2023) (Note: In employment and aged 16 or over (quantity) or aged 16–64 (percent))
- Labour force by occupation: List: 30.1% Professional Occupations; 19.7% Associate Professional Occupations; 10.4% Skilled Trades Occupations; 7.8% Caring, Leisure And Other Service Occupations; 6.3% Sales And Customer Service Occs; 5.6% Administrative & Secretarial Occupations; 3.4% Managers, Directors And Senior Officials; (Jan–Dec 2023) (Note: Percent is a proportion of all persons in employment aged 16 and over)
- Unemployment: 16,800 / 5.1% (Jan 2023-Dec 2023) (Note: Unemployed aged 16 and over. Percent is a proportion of economically active.)

The city of Glasgow, in the central belt of Scotland, encompasses the largest municipal and regional economy in Scotland. It is recognised as the largest contributor to the Scottish economy, and is the largest integrated economic region in Scotland. Glasgow produces around a third of Scotland's output, business base, research power and employment. By Gross Domestic Product (GDP) figures, Glasgow City ranks second amongst Scottish areas, behind Edinburgh and ahead of Aberdeen and Aberdeenshire. In 2021, Glasgow's GDP was estimated at just under 25.8 billion pounds, with an estimated £48 billion in Gross Value Added (GVA) in 2021.

Together with the country's capital city, Edinburgh and it's associated economy, the central belt of Scotland is one of the 20 largest urban regions in Europe. Based on Gross Value Added (GVA) and GVA per head figures in 2015, Glasgow's economy was the fifth largest amongst the cities of the United Kingdom.

== Economic profile ==
=== Employee Jobs By Industry ===
As of 2022, the largest industries in Glasgow consist of the following sectors:

Employee Jobs By Industry in Glasgow
Industry	Glasgow City (Employee Jobs)	Glasgow City (%)
Human Health And Social Work Activities	63,000	14.6
Administrative And Support Service Activities	59,000	13.7
Wholesale And Retail Trade; Repair Of Motor Vehicles And Motorcycles	45,000	10.4
Professional, Scientific And Technical Activities	40,000	9.3
Education	39,000	9.0
Accommodation And Food Service Activities	32,000	7.4
Information And Communication	23,000	5.3
Financial And Insurance Activities	19,000	4.4
Construction	18,000	4.2
Manufacturing	18,000	4.2
Transportation And Storage	12,000	2.8
Arts, Entertainment And Recreation	11,000	2.6

=== Total Employee Jobs ===
Total Employee Jobs
Job Type	Glasgow City (Employee Jobs)	Glasgow City (%)
Full-time	298,000	69.1
Part-time	133,000	30.9
Total	431,000	100

=== Workforce skills and education ===
Workforce skills and education
SVQ Level Qualification or alternative education	%
None	10.75%
Level 1	6.87%
Level 2	11.6%
Level 3	13.49%
Level 4	47.69%
Other	6.7%
Apprenticeship	2.89%

== Economic overview ==
=== History ===
==== Manufacturing ====
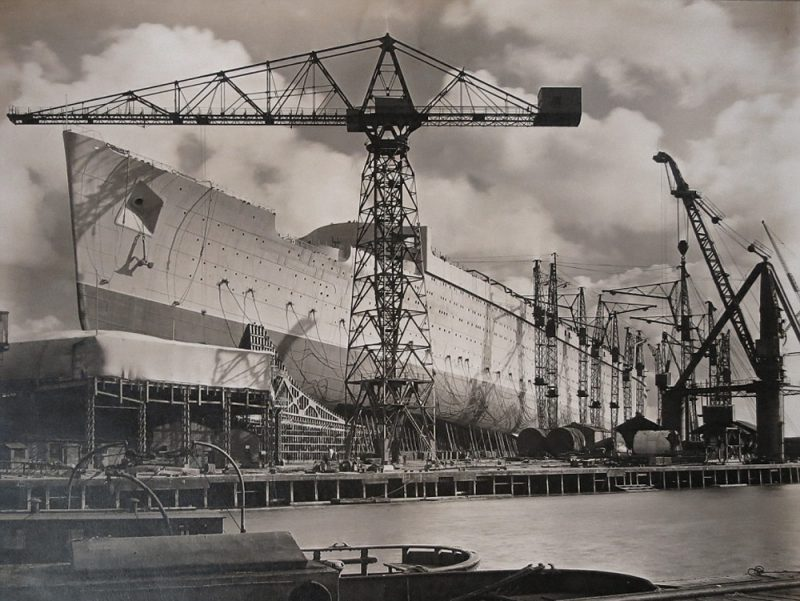
Vessels such as the RMS Queen Mary are largely regarded as a sign of Glaswegian powerhouse shipbuilding industry.

Glasgow was once one of the most significant cities in the UK for manufacturing, which generated a great deal of the city's wealth; the most prominent industry being shipbuilding based on the River Clyde. Among the historic vessels constructed there were the famed tea clipper Cutty Sark, the Royal Navy battlecruiser HMS Hood, and the transatlantic luxury liners Aquitania, RMS Queen Mary, RMS Queen Elizabeth, and RMS Queen Elizabeth II.

Although Glasgow owed much of its economic growth to the shipbuilding industry, which still continues today in the form of Ferguson Marine and BAE Systems Maritime - Naval Ships' two shipyards, the city has its roots in the tobacco trade and is noted to have "risen from its medieval slumber" from trade in tobacco, pioneered by figures such as John Glassford. The city was also noted for its locomotive construction industry – led by firms such as the North British Locomotive Company – which grew during the 19th century before entering a decline in the 1960s.

==== Tertiary ====
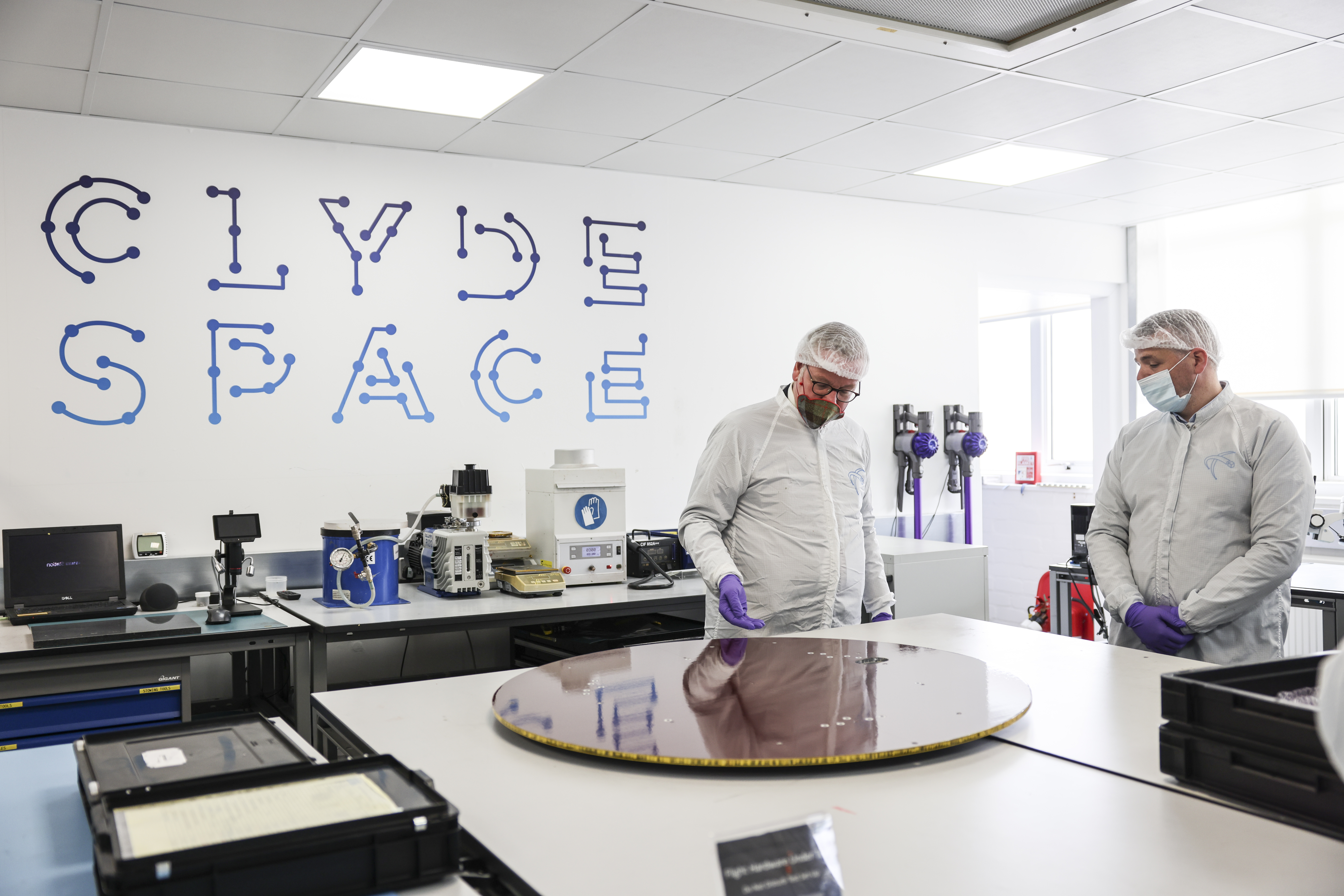
Clyde Space spacecraft manufacturers based in Glasgow

Whilst manufacturing has declined, Glasgow's economy has seen significant relative growth of tertiary sector industries such as financial and business services (centred around the International Financial Services District on the Broomielaw, once a stretch of riverside warehouses replaced by modern office blocks), communications, biosciences, creative industries, healthcare, higher education, retail and tourism. Glasgow is now the second most popular foreign tourist destination in Scotland (fifth in the UK) and offers Scotland's largest retail centre.

=== Modern industry ===
==== Financial ====
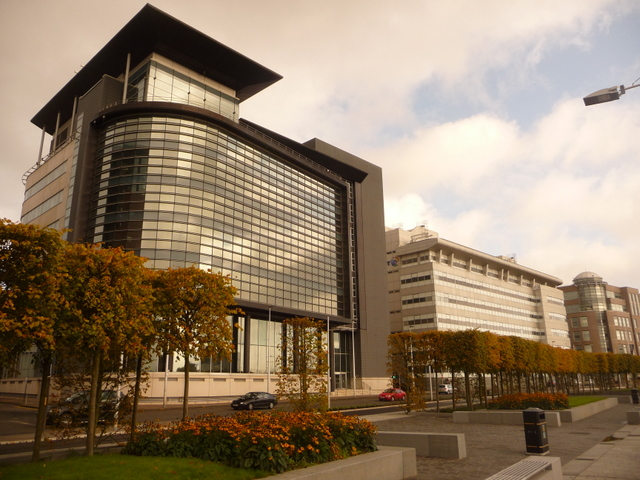
Scottish Government offices at 5 Atlantic Quay in the financial centre of the city

Between 1998 and 2001, the city's financial services sector grew at a rate of 30%, making considerable gains on Edinburgh, which has historically been the centre of the Scottish financial sector. Glasgow is now one of Europe's sixteen largest financial centres, with a growing number of Blue chip financial sector companies establishing significant operations or headquarters in the city.

==== Offices ====
The 1990s and first decade of the 21st century saw substantial growth in the number of call centres based in Glasgow. In 2007 roughly 20,000 people, a third of all call centre employees in Scotland, were employed by Glasgow call centres. This growth and its high use of recruitment agencies to hire graduates as temporary workers has led to accusations of exploitative practices such as long hours, poor pay and lack of job security by the TUC and other union bodies.

==== Modern industries ====
The city's main manufacturing industries include companies involved in; shipbuilding, engineering, construction, brewing and distilling, printing and publishing, chemicals and textiles as well as newer growth sectors such as optoelectronics, software development and biotechnology. Glasgow forms the western part of the Silicon Glen high tech sector of Scotland with consumer electronics companies such as RHA Technologies headquartered.

=== International Financial Services District ===
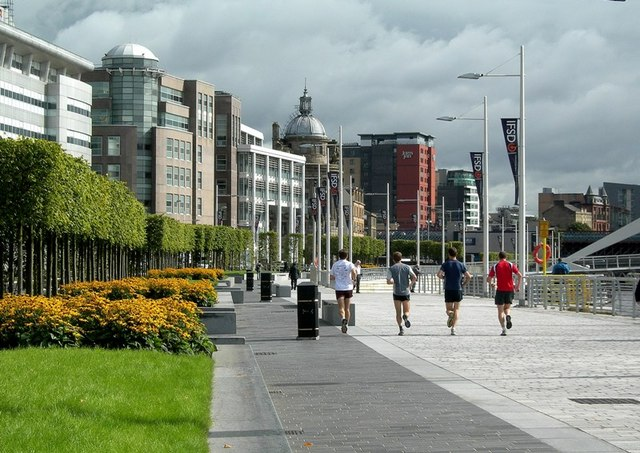
The International Financial Services District alongside the River Clyde

To the western edge of the city centre, occupying the areas of Blythswood Hill and Anderston, lies Glasgow's financial district, known officially as the International Financial Services District (IFSD), although often irreverently nicknamed by the contemporary press as the "square kilometre" or "Wall Street on Clyde". Since the late 1980s the construction of many modern office blocks and high rise developments have paved the way for the IFSD to become one of the UK's largest financial quarters. With a reputation as an established financial services centre, coupled with comprehensive support services, Glasgow continues to attract and grow new business.

Of the 10 largest general insurance companies in the UK, 8 have a base or head office in Glasgow – including Direct Line, Esure, AXA and Norwich Union. Key banking sector companies have also moved some of their services to commercial property in Glasgow – Resolution, JPMorgan Chase, Barclays Wealth, Tesco Personal Finance, Morgan Stanley, Lloyds Banking Group, Clydesdale Bank, BNP Paribas, HSBC, Santander and the Royal Bank of Scotland. The Ministry of Defence have several departments and Clydeport, the Glasgow Stock Exchange, Student Loans Company, Scottish Executive Enterprise, Transport and Lifelong Learning Department, BT Group, Scottish Friendly. Scottish Qualifications Authority and Scottish Enterprise also have their headquarters in the district. Royal Dutch Shell also have one of their six worldwide Shared Business Centres located in the IFSD. Hilton has a corporate office based in the area.

== See also ==
- Economy of Scotland
- Economy of Edinburgh
- Economy of Aberdeen
