= Radio Forth =

Edinburgh; Scotland
- Broadcast area: Edinburgh, The Lothians, Fife and Falkirk
- Frequencies: Forth 1: 97.3/97.6/102.2 MHz; GHR Edinburgh, The Lothians, Fife & Falkirk: DAB; All services on DAB: 12D

Programming
- Format: Forth 1: CHR/Pop; GHR Edinburgh, The Lothians, Fife & Falkirk: Classic Hits

Ownership
- Owner: Bauer Media Audio UK

History
- First air date: 22 January 1975; 6 February 1990 (RFM/Max AM split); 19 January 2015

Links
- Webcast: Yes
- Website: Forth 1 GHR Edinburgh, The Lothians, Fife & Falkirk

Radio Forth is a group of two Independent Local Radio stations serving Edinburgh, Lothians and Fife. Radio Forth is owned and operated by Bauer, based at studios in Edinburgh and forms part of Bauer's Hits Radio network and Greatest Hits Radio network of local stations.

== History ==
Radio Forth was launched on 22 January 1975 on 194 metres medium wave (1548 kHz) by Richard Findlay, whose opening speech included the words: This, for the very first time, is Radio Forth. The first presenter on air was breakfast show host Steve Hamilton. Other presenters included Steve Jack, Bill Torrance on the daytime shows (including drivetime) and also had special nighttime slots including a once-a-week show for the public to call into the show and discuss their issues and problems. The station is also well known for its Radio Forth charity auctions where it auctioned off donated items, services and what have you with all the funds raised going to a local charity or providing much-needed funds for causes throughout the broadcast area.

In 1990, Forth created a second station on its AM frequency. Before this, Radio Forth was broadcast as a single station on both FM and AM frequencies although in 1984 Radio Forth had been the first Independent Local Radio station in the UK to operate a split service when it created Festival City Radio to provide coverage of that year's Edinburgh Festival. The FM station was renamed Radio Forth RFM and aimed at a younger age group, while Max AM was designed for over 35s. The FM station was later renamed Forth FM and then in the mid-late 90s, Max AM was later renamed Forth AM to match its sister station.

In 2000, both stations were relaunched as 97.3 Forth One and 1548 FORTH2. Many changes occurred at this time, including new presenters and a revamped station sound. Forth 2 was redesigned as an adult contemporary music station while Forth One continued to play chart and contemporary music for under-35s.

Radio Forth was originally owned by a consortium of local companies (The Scotsman, Scottish & Newcastle, Christian Salvesen among them) until acquired by Scottish Radio Holdings in [1995?] and on 3 June 2005 British media group EMAP took over SRH. In January 2008, the EMAP's radio business was brought out by the German-based Bauer group.

Most of Radio Forth's locally produced programming airs on Forth 1, consisting of 13 hours on weekdays and 4 hours at weekends, with live football commentaries airing on Forth 2. Both stations also carry local news, sport and traffic bulletins every day. Some networked programming is produced by Radio Forth for broadcast across Scotland and northern England, alongside output from sister stations such as Radio Clyde in Clydebank and Hits Radio in Manchester.

== See also ==
- Edinburgh and District Churches’ Council for Local Broadcasting (EDCCLB)
- Forth 1
- Greatest Hits Radio Edinburgh, Lothians & Fife
