= Forth 1 =

Radio station in Edinburgh, Scotland

Coordinates: 55°57′28″N 3°11′12″W

- Logo used since 2015.
- Edinburgh; United Kingdom
- Broadcast area: Edinburgh, Lothian, Fife and Falkirk
- Frequencies: FM: 102.2 (Penicuik); FM: 97.3 (Edinburgh)(Fife) and (Falkirk) MHz; FM: 97.6 (West Lothian) MHz; DAB: 12D
- RDS: FORTH1

Programming
- Format: CHR/pop
- Network: Hits Radio

Ownership
- Owner: Bauer Media Audio UK
- Sister stations: Greatest Hits Radio Edinburgh, Lothians & Fife

History
- First air date: 22 January 1975

Links
- Webcast: Rayo
- Website: Forth 1

Forth 1 is an Independent Local Radio station based in Edinburgh, Scotland, owned and operated by Bauer Media Audio UK as part of the Hits Radio network. It broadcasts to Edinburgh, the Lothians, Fife and Falkirk.

As of September 2024, the station has a weekly audience of 383,000 listeners according to RAJAR.

== History ==
Forth 1 logo used from 2013 to 2015.

Radio Forth was launched on 22 January 1975 by current chairman Richard Findlay. His opening speech included "This, for the very first time is Radio Forth". Steve Hamilton was the first on-air presenter, hosting the breakfast show.

In 1990, Forth was forced to create a new station on its AM frequency. Before this, Radio Forth was broadcast as a single station on both FM and AM frequencies. The FM station was renamed Radio Forth RFM (later simplified to Forth FM) with Donny Hughes broadcasting the first Breakfast Show from the newly revamped Studio F in Forth House. The new AM station became "Max AM" which was later renamed Forth AM to match its sister station.

In 2000, both stations were relaunched as 97.3 Forth One and 1548 Forth 2. Forth 2 was redesigned as an adult contemporary music station while Forth One continued to play Top 40 songs for the 35s and under.

Radio Forth was owned by Scottish Radio Holdings until 3 June 2005 when British media group EMAP took over. In January 2008, EMAP Radio was sold to Bauer and the radio division was renamed Bauer Radio. Ownership changes have led to more networked programming on the station.

On Friday 17 June 2022, Forth 1 broadcast from their studios at Forth House for the final time. During the breakfast show at 7.45 the station played a farewell montage before walking to their new studios at St James Quarter where the first link was broadcast just after 8am. The first song played from the new studios was 'New Emotion' by The Time Frequency.

On 6 January 2025, Forth 1’s breakfast show expanded, replacing MFR, Northsound 1 and Tay FM’s separate local breakfast shows.

== Programming ==
Local programming 'Boogie in the Morning' is produced and broadcast from Radio Forth's Edinburgh studios based within St James Quarter shopping centre from 6am-10am Monday-Friday. The station also produces networked programming on Saturday mornings - Boogie and Arlene, also The Big Saturday Football Show with Steven Mill & Ewen Cameron

Forth 1 also airs networked programming from Clyde 1 in Glasgow and Hits Radio in London & Manchester.

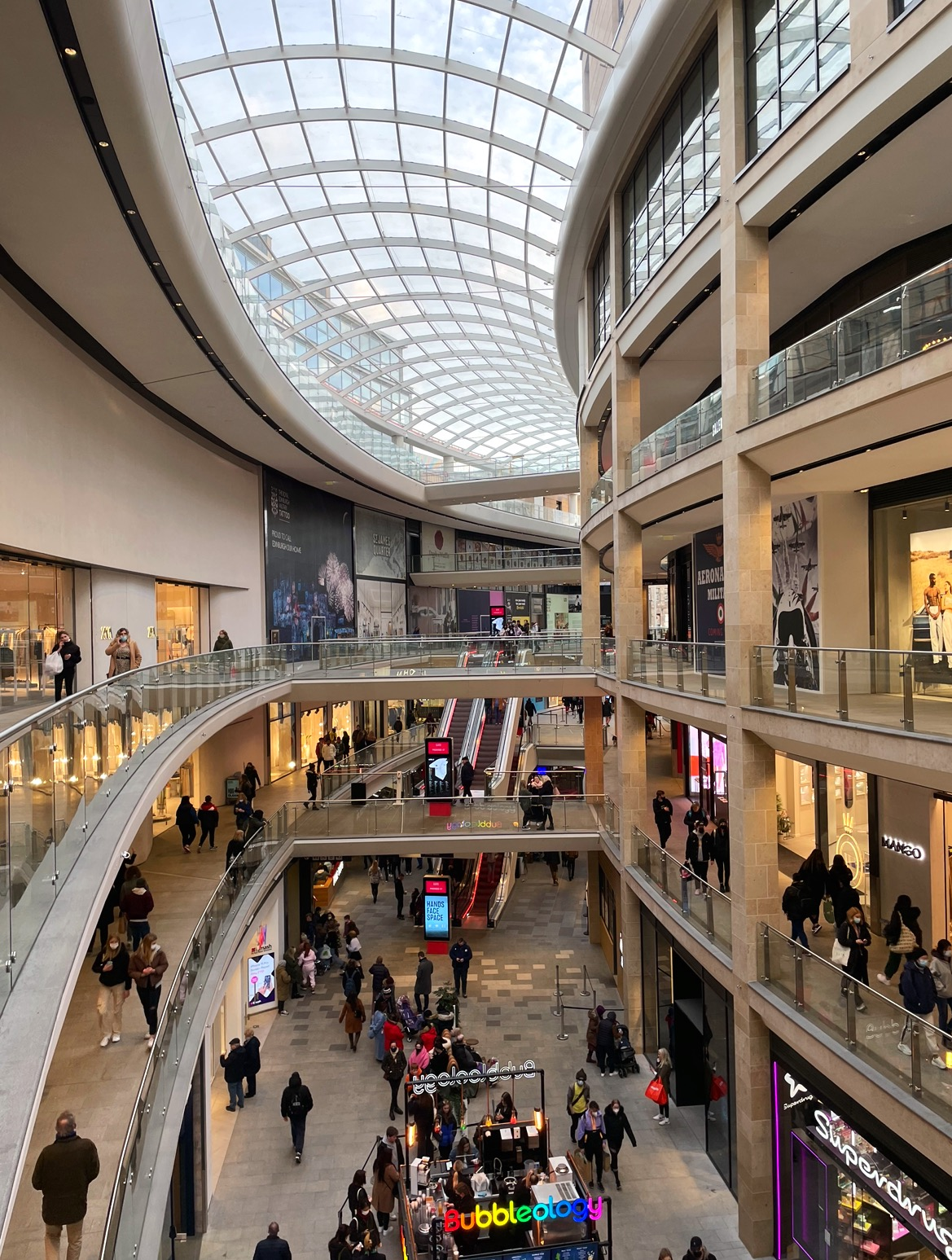
Forth 1 and sister station Greatest Hits Radio Edinburgh, Lothians and Fife, broadcast from studios in St James Quarter in Edinburgh city centre, since 2022

=== News ===
Forth 1 broadcasts local news bulletins hourly from 6am to 7pm on weekdays and from 7am to 1pm at weekends. Headlines are broadcast on the half-hour during weekday breakfast and drivetime shows, alongside sport and traffic bulletins.

National bulletins from Sky News Radio are carried overnight with bespoke networked Scottish bulletins at weekends, produced from Radio Clyde's newsroom in Glasgow.

== See also ==
- Radio Forth
- Greatest Hits Radio Edinburgh, Lothians & Fife
