= EDCCLB =

The Edinburgh and District Churches’ Council for Local Broadcasting was founded in 1974 and exists to encourage, develop and support religious broadcasting in Edinburgh and surrounding districts. The council is resourced by local churches and promotes Christian involvement in all aspects of local broadcasting in the area.

The council has forged particularly strong links with Radio Forth, Edinburgh's main commercial radio station.
