= Bonnie & Wild =

Coordinates: 55.9542028°N 3.1884139°W

Bonnie & Wild in November 2026

Bonnie & Wild’s Scottish Marketplace is a food hall in Edinburgh, Scotland, located in the St James Quarter. It opened in July 2021 with National Chef of Scotland Gary Maclean and TV chef Jimmy Lee among the opening line-up of kitchens. The line-up now includes El Perro Negro, twice winner of the UK Burger Awards, and Kochchi, winner of several awards including the Scottish street food awards.

== Awards & Recognition ==
In 2024, it received a business award from Scotland Food & Drink, and in 2023 received the national Taste Our Best accreditation from VisitScotland.

It has been listed by The Times and National Geographic as one of the UK's best food halls.

== Events ==
On the last Thursday of every month, it hosts a free ceilidh night called the White Heather Club.
