= Richard Findlay (broadcaster) =

Scottish broadcaster

Richard Findlay CBE (5 November 1943 – 8 July 2017) was a Scottish broadcaster who served as Chairman of STV and CEO of Scottish Radio Holdings, amongst other roles.

== Life ==
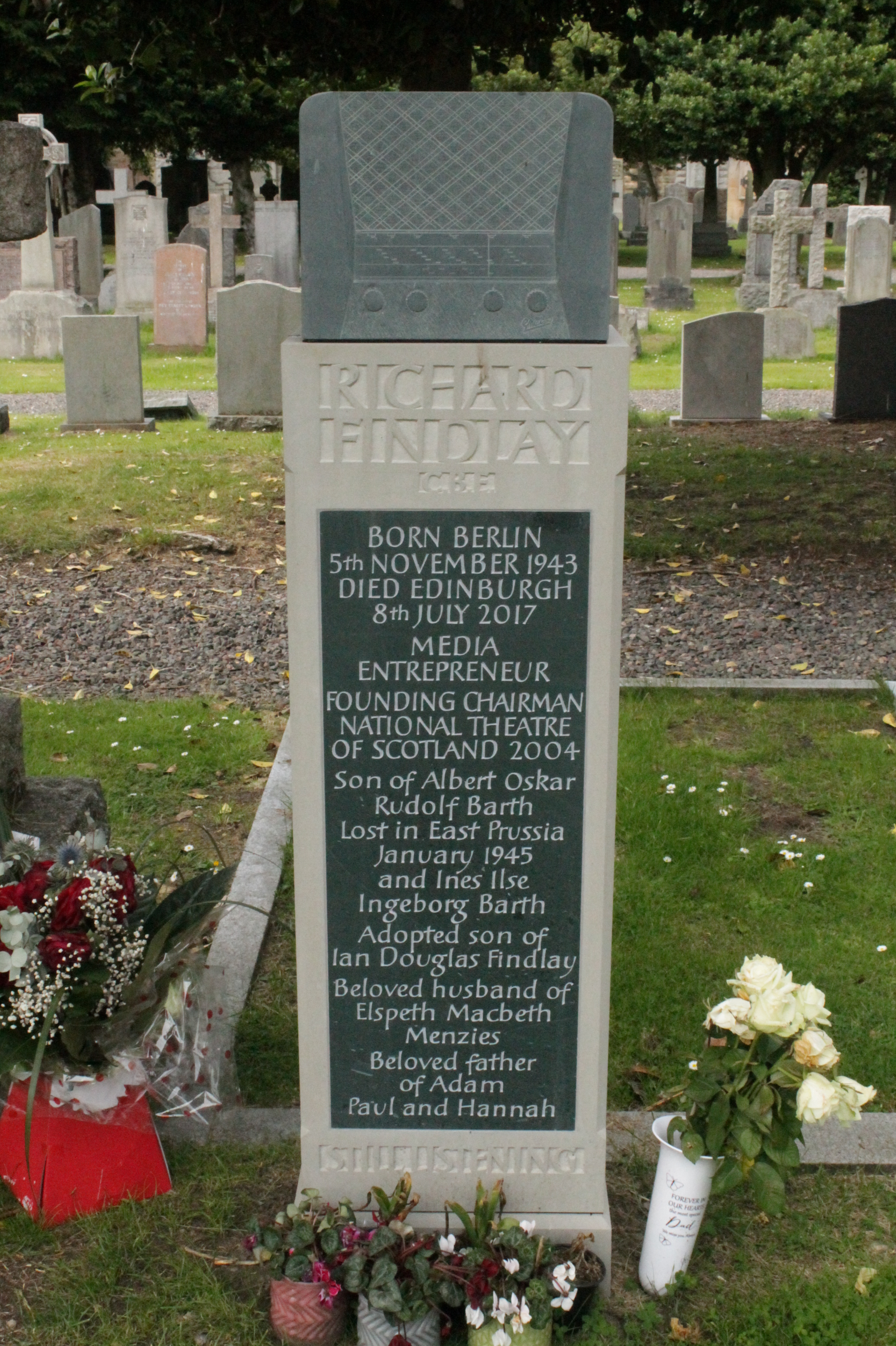
Richard Findlay's grave in Dean Cemetery, Edinburgh

Findlay was born Dietrich Rudolf Barth in Berlin on 5 November 1943, during the Second World War. He did not know his father, Albert Oskar Rudolf Barth, who was killed somewhere in East Prussia, having earlier won the Iron Cross with Oak Leaves. His mother Ines Ilse Ingeborg Barth ("Inge") worked as a translator for the British Occupation Force in Berlin. There she met Captain Ian Douglas Findlay, and married him. The couple returned to Scotland and brought Dietrich with them, along with his older sister Linde. For obvious reasons they decided to give him a new name when they arrived, and Dietrich became Richard Findlay.

Having a strong artistic flair Richard studied at the Royal Scottish Academy of Music and Drama in Glasgow. He graduated in 1963 and obtained a 6 month contract with the BBC. His debut was as a monk in a production of The Brothers Karamazov.

His next role was playing a schoolteacher in an STV drama series "This Man Craig" (1966/7) and then "The Revenue Men" (1967/8). However, he felt uncomfortable in front of the camera. After spending some time as a continuity announcer for BBC Scotland he was asked to set up an English language radio station in Saudi Arabia.

In 1972 he got a job with the COI Radio Division in London and moved to a 14th century tithe barn in Crowborough in East Sussex. In 1973 he moved to the privately run and newly created Capital Radio in their newsroom. In the same year he created Waverley Radio in an attempt to control the East of Scotland radio franchise, but this was awarded to the rival Radio Forth. However, Radio Forth recruited Findlay as programme controller, and he later rose to be Chief Executive.

In 1991 a merger with Radio Clyde created Scottish Radio Holdings (SRH) then working with James Gordon, Lord Gordon. In 1995 they expanded into publishing, creating Score Press which ran 45 publications. He stood down as Chief Executive in 2004 and soon after the company was sold to Emap for £394 million.

In 2003 he was brought in to set up the National Theatre of Scotland and served as its first Chairman. In 2007 he was brought in to rescue STV as its new Chairman with Rob Woodward as CEO. His final role was the rescue of Creative Scotland.

He died following a short illness on 8 July 2017, at the age of 73. He is buried in Dean Cemetery. The highly unusual grave depicts a war-time radio on top. It lies on the north side of the main entrance path.

== Family ==
In 1971 he married Elspeth Macbeth Menzies. They had two sons and a daughter.

== Positions held ==
see

- Chief Executive Officer of Scottish Radio Holdings
- Chief Executive of Radio Forth
- Chief Executive of Score Press
- Chairman of STV
- Chairman of the National Theatre of Scotland
- Chairman of the Royal Lyceum Theatre
- Chairman of Lothian Health Board
- Governor and Fellow of the Royal Conservatoire of Scotland
- Governor of Creative Scotland
- Board Member of New Wave Media
- Rector of Heriot-Watt University
