= Economy of Edinburgh =

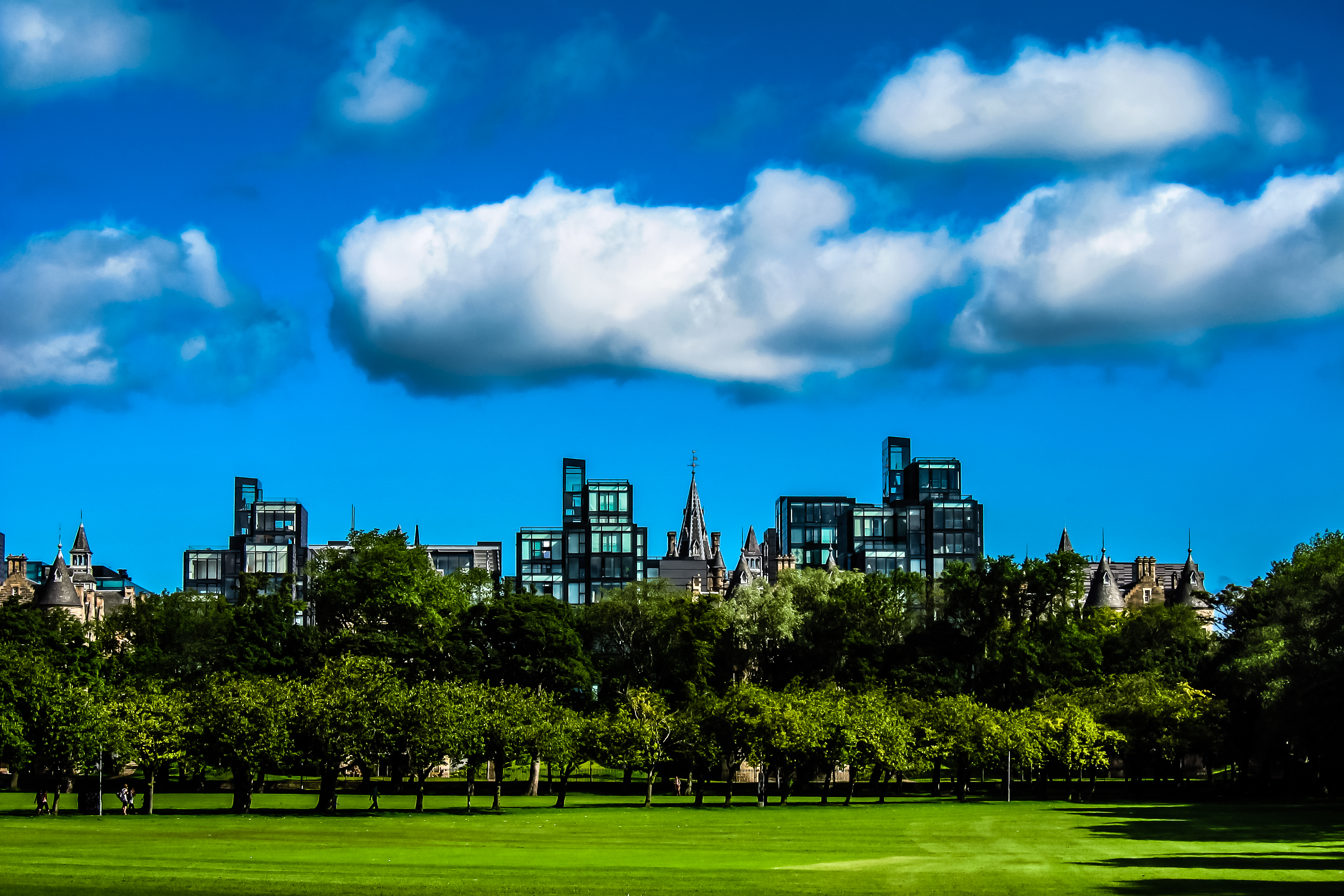
- Quartermile, mixed use development including office space and retail units

Statistics
- Population: 530,680 (2024)
- GDP: £36.5 billion (2023)
- GDP per capita: £69,809 (2023)
- Labour force: 312,100 / 82.1% in employment (Jan 2023-Dec 2023) (Note: In employment and aged 16 or over (quantity) or aged 16–64 (percent))
- Labour force by occupation: List: 40.8% Professional Occupations; 19.4% Associate Professional Occupations; 9.4% Managers, Directors And Senior Officials; 7.5% Administrative & Secretarial Occupations; 6.0% Sales And Customer Service Occs; 5.4% Skilled Trades Occupations; 4.9% Caring, Leisure And Other Service Occupations; 4.8% Elementary Occupations; 1.8% Process Plant & Machine Operatives; (Jan–Dec 2023) (Note: Percent is a proportion of all persons in employment aged 16 and over)
- Unemployment: 10,900 / 3.5% (Jan 2023-Dec 2023) (Note: Unemployed aged 16 and over. Percent is a proportion of economically active.)
- Average gross salary: £720.70 per week (2023) (Note: Median gross weekly pay for full time employees resident in Edinburgh)

Edinburgh, the capital city of Scotland, was ranked the 13th largest financial centre internationally and the 4th largest financial centre in Europe in the Global Financial Centres Index in 2020. The economy of Edinburgh is recognised as a powerhouse of the Scottish economy, as well as the wider UK economy, being the second largest financial centre in the United Kingdom behind London.

Edinburgh has been consistently one of the most prosperous parts of the country and has the strongest economy of any city in the UK outside London. In 2023, its gross domestic product per capita of £69,809 surpassed London's for the first time. Financial Times FDi Magazine has named Edinburgh as the "Best Large European City of the Future" and "Best Foreign Direct Investment Strategy (Large City)" for 2012/13.

The city is consistently ranked as one of Scotland's major industrial hubs, with an employment workforce of around 48,030 across the city.

== Economic profile ==
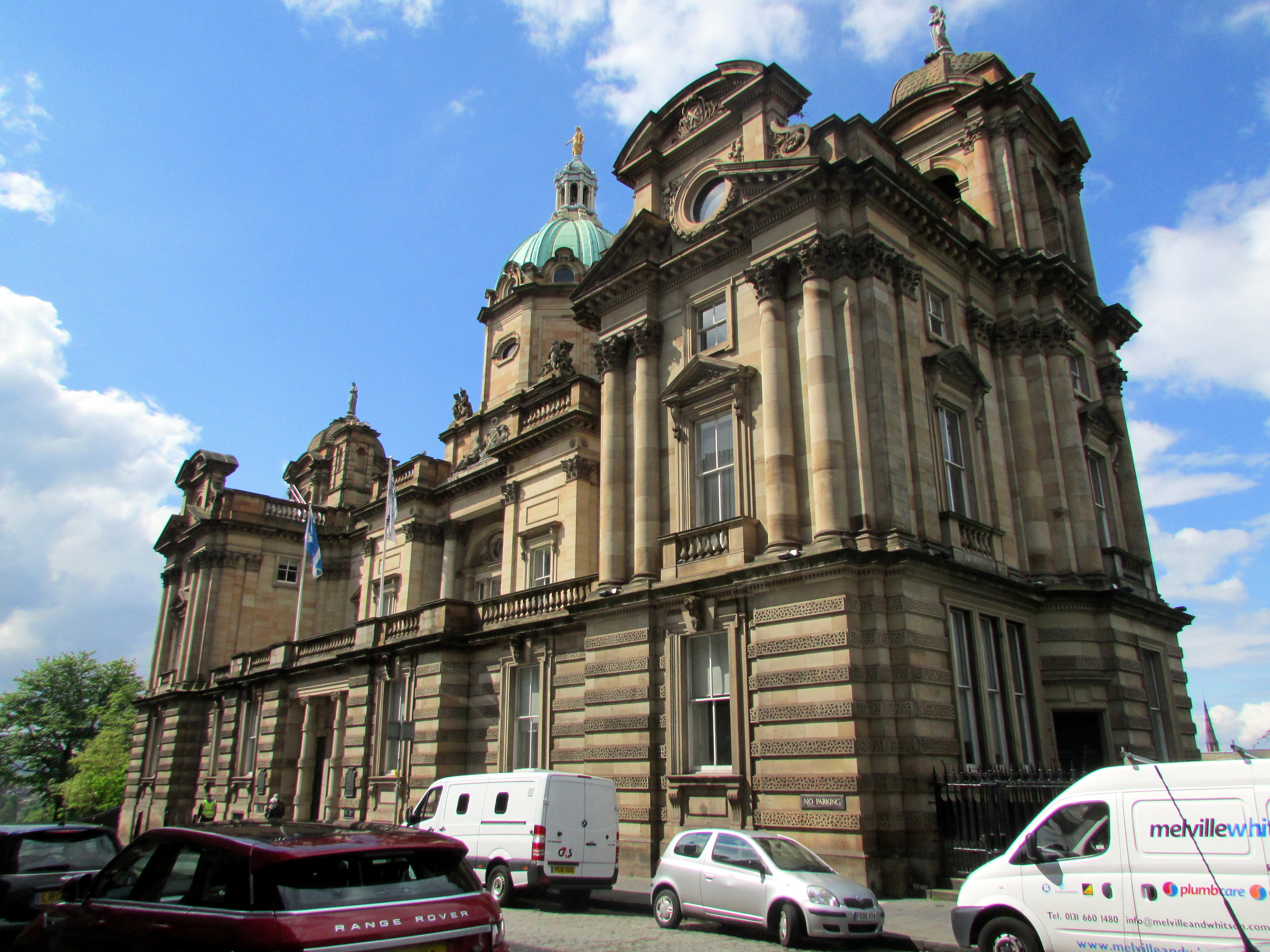
Bank of Scotland headquarters in Edinburgh

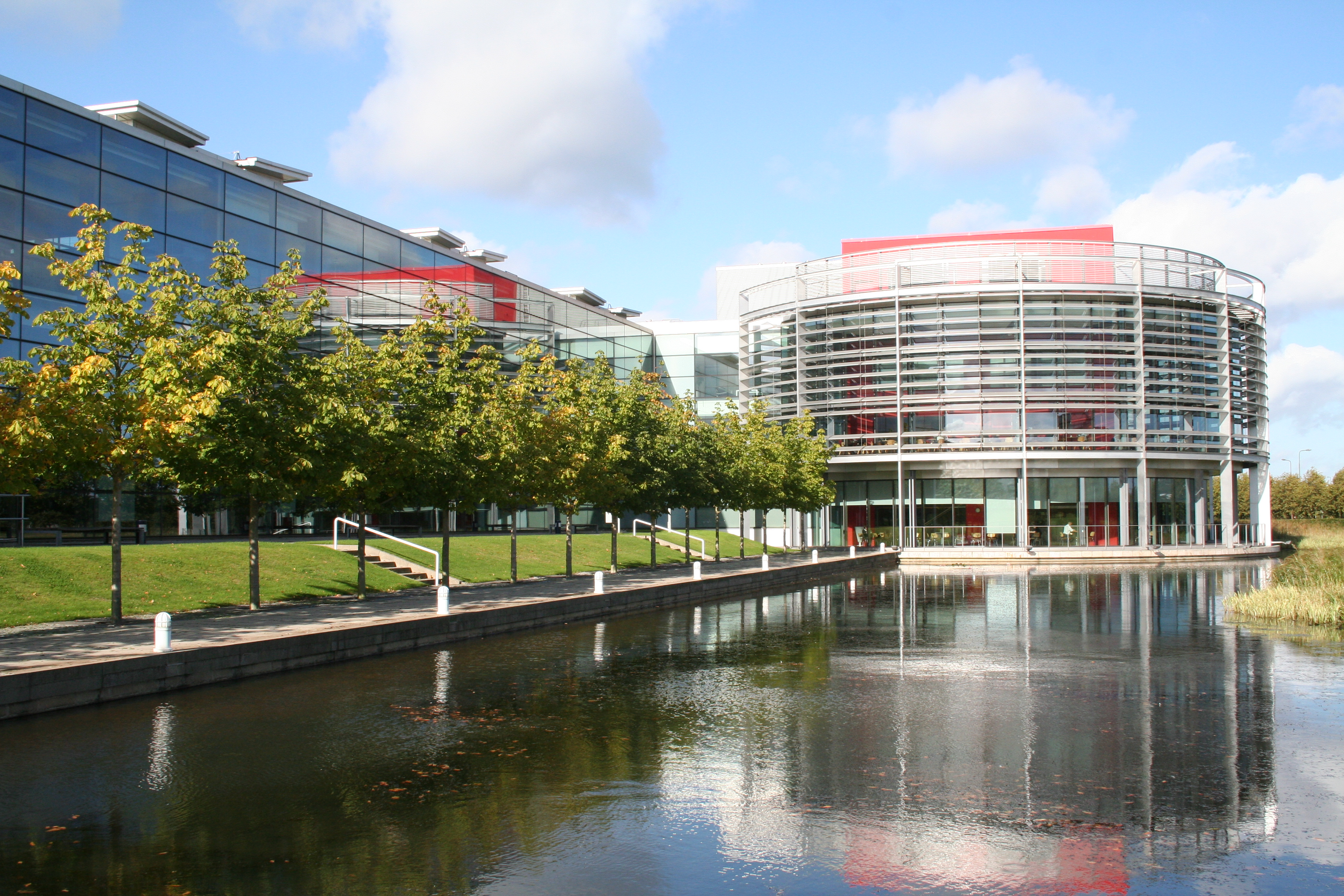
Edinburgh Park

=== Banking history ===
Banking has been a mainstay of the Edinburgh economy for over 300 years, since the Bank of Scotland was established by an act of the Scottish Parliament in 1695. Today, the financial services industry, with its particularly strong insurance and investment sectors, and underpinned by Edinburgh-based firms such as Scottish Widows and Standard Life Aberdeen, accounts for the city being the UK's second financial centre after London and Europe's fourth in terms of equity assets.

The NatWest Group (formerly Royal Bank of Scotland Group) opened new global headquarters at Gogarburn in the west of the city in October 2005. In the 19th century, Edinburgh's economy was known for banking and insurance, publishing and printing, and brewing and distilling. Today, its economy is based mainly on financial services, scientific research, higher education, and tourism.

=== Statistics ===
- In 2011, the population of Edinburgh was estimated at 476,600, which was an increase of 28,000 on the figure from 2001 which stood at 448,600.
- The city has the second-highest gross value added (GVA) per resident (behind London) in major UK cities, with the average being £34,178 per resident.
- The employment rate for the city stood at 73.6% for Q1 of 2013, which was higher than the rate for Scotland as a whole, which stood at 71.8%.
- The city has the lowest percentage of total working age residents claiming Jobseeker's Allowance of major UK cities at 3.2% as of December 2012.
- Edinburgh is second only to London in average gross annual earnings per resident in major UK cities, with an average salary of £27,800.

== Top employers ==
The table below shows the top employers in terms of employee numbers in the City of Edinburgh:

Top employers, City of Edinburgh
Employer	Number of employees
NHS Lothian	19,890
City of Edinburgh Council	18,617
University of Edinburgh	13,372
NatWest Group	8,368
Lloyds Banking Group	7,500
Standard Life	5,259
The Scottish Government	3,913
Lothian and Borders Police	2,439
Tesco (inc Tesco Bank)	2,400
Royal Mail	2,257
| Source: Edinburgh by Numbers 2013/14

This next table highlights the number of people in employment in the City of Edinburgh by industrial sector:

Top employment sectors, City of Edinburgh
Sector	Number of employees
Human health and social work	45,300
Wholesale, retail and repair	36,400
Financial Services	34,600
Education	29,200
Accommodation and food services	26,800
Professional, scientific and technical activities	27,100
Administrative and support services activities	21,000
Public administration, defence and social security	18,700
Information and communication	12,400
Transportation and storage	10,200
Arts, entertainment and recreation	10,000
Construction	9,000
Manufacturing	7,300
Other service activities	5,500
Primary industries and utilities	3,200
Real estate	5,200
| Source: Edinburgh by Numbers 2013/14

== Key sectors ==
=== Financial services ===
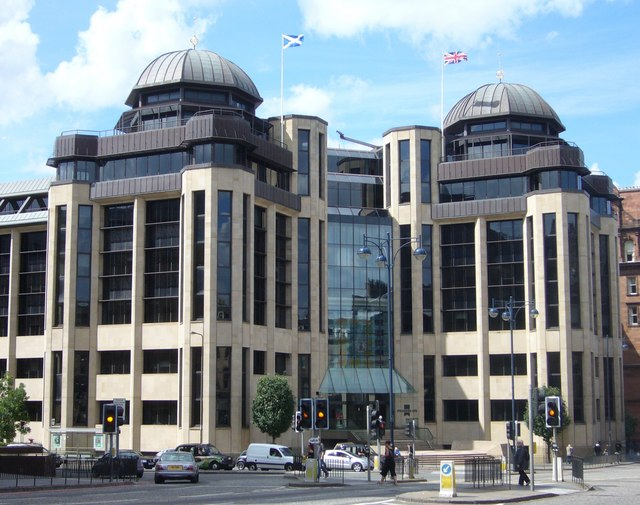
Headquarters of Standard Life on Lothian Road. The area is at the heart of an expanding financial district.

Edinburgh is the second largest financial centre in the United Kingdom, after the City of London, and the fourth in Europe by equity assets.

Edinburgh has been a centre of banking for over 300 years; the Bank of Scotland was founded in 1695, by an act of the original Parliament of Scotland and is now part of Lloyds Banking Group, who have retained the Scottish headquarters in Edinburgh. The Royal Bank of Scotland (RBS) was founded in 1727 by royal charter. In 2000, RBS acquired National Westminster Bank in the biggest banking takeover in British history. It is now part of the NatWest Group, who have also retained the Edinburgh headquarters, operating from a complex at Gogarburn since 2005. TSB, Tesco Bank, Sainsbury's Bank, and Virgin Money also have headquarters in the city.

In insurance terms, indigenous Edinburgh companies such as Standard Life and Scottish Widows form a large part of the European insurance sector as well as being major employers in the city. Scottish Widows was founded in 1815, managing £145.79 billion worth of funds at June 2013 with a workforce of around 3,500.

The New Town and city centre has traditionally been home to many companies, in the banking, finance and legal professions, but modern needs have caused many to relocate. Immediately to the west of the city centre is the Terry Farrell master-planned Exchange business district, which now houses major employers such as Scottish Widows, Standard Life, the Clydesdale Bank, and Baillie Gifford.

Edinburgh Park is one of the largest business parks in the UK and is located on the western periphery of city, near Edinburgh Airport. The park was opened in 1992, between two large out-of-town shopping developments at South Gyle and Hermiston Gait (all three with their own respective tram stops), and is close to Edinburgh Airport as well as major road routes such as the A8, the M8, M9 and M90 motorways and the A720 Edinburgh City Bypass. It is also centred between three local railway stations - Edinburgh Gateway, South Gyle and its own, Edinburgh Park. Close to Edinburgh Park at Gogarburn, the Royal Bank of Scotland have their global headquarters campus. HSBC, Royal Bank, Diageo, J. P. Morgan, Telewest, BT, Fujitsu and Lloyds Banking Group have all established large offices in this park. Following the opening of the Royal Bank's new headquarters, there will be around 20,000 people working in the western outskirts of the city.

=== Technology and software ===
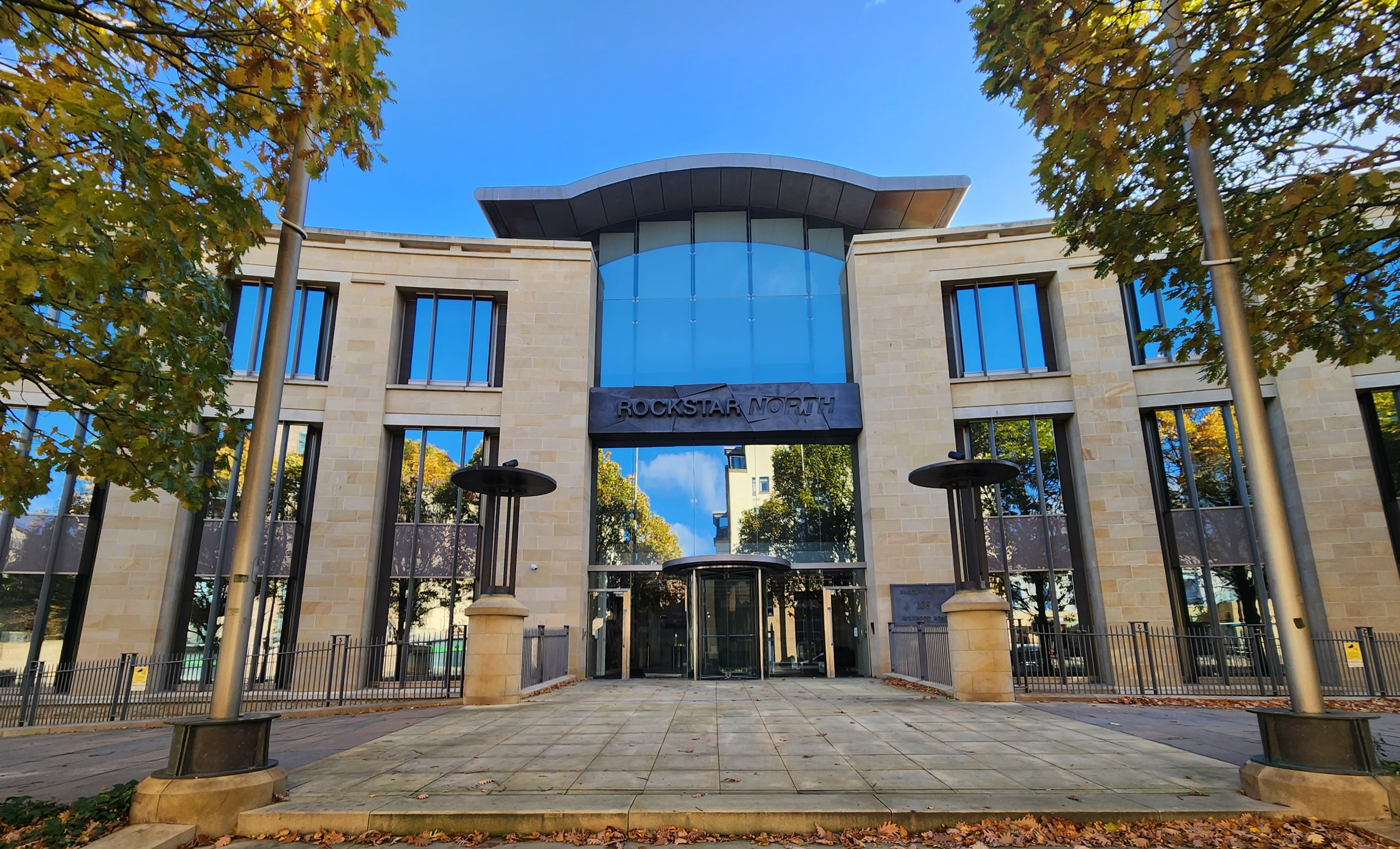
Rockstar North headquarters, the developer famous for the Grand Theft Auto series

Edinburgh has an estimated 17,136 people working within digital companies. The technology sector has grown upon the expertise within the city’s universities. The city has seen a growth in the number of software companies in the city over the last 10 years and there are now more than 100. These include travel search website Skyscanner and one day fantasy sports provider FanDuel who have grow within the city. Rockstar North (formerly DMA Design), known for creating the Grand Theft Auto series, is also based in Edinburgh. Several large corporates have invested in Edinburgh including Amazon Development Centre Scotland and Microsoft. The School of Informatics is the UK’s largest and longest established research group in informatics. In the REF 2014 assessment for computer science and informatics the School of Informatics has produced more "world-leading" and "internationally excellent" research (4* and 3-star) than any other university in the UK.

A large number of technology companies are based in the area around the University of Edinburgh.

=== Retail ===
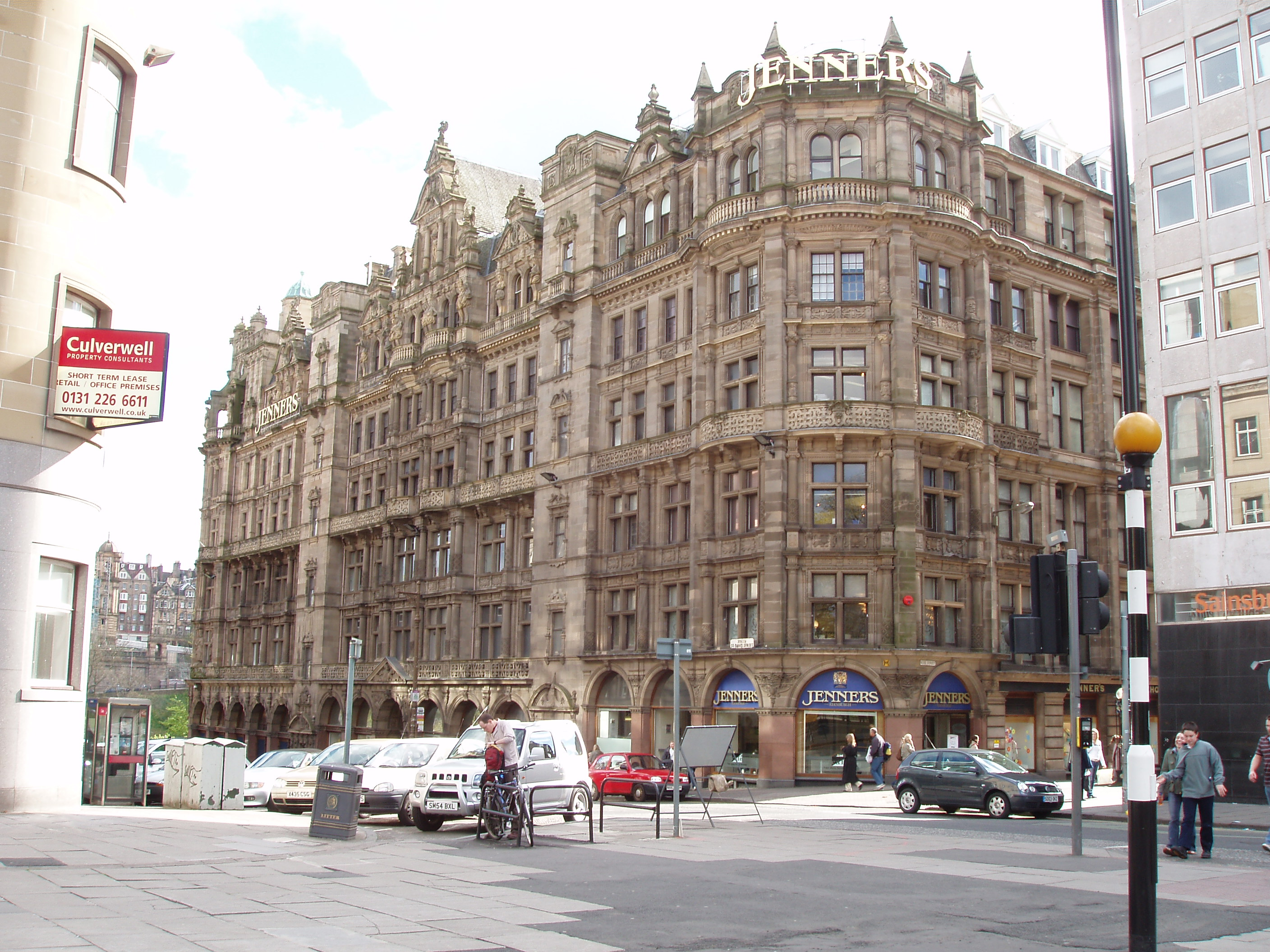
Jenners on Princes Street, one of Edinburgh's main streets

Edinburgh has not had as large or as significant a retail sector compared to Glasgow, however large out-of-town shopping developments have taken place in recent years, such as the Gyle development in 1993 and the Fort Kinnaird shopping complex located to the east of the city. The St. James Centre and Princes Mall started in the 1970s, then Cameron Toll in the 1980s. More recent developments are the Gyle centre next to Edinburgh Park, Ocean Terminal in Leith and the retail parks at Hermiston Gait, Straiton and Fort Kinnaird which are all next to the Edinburgh City Bypass. Edinburgh has many modern supermarkets in its suburbs which offer a more day-to-day type of shopping. As a shopping centre, particularly Princes Street, Edinburgh suffered some decline for a number of years, but since 2005 has seen the City centre yield rise in comparison to other similarly sized cities. Recent attempts to encourage shoppers back into the city centre have included the development of top brand department stores on George Street and St Andrew Square and plans to redevelop Princes Street in the future. In October 2016, the St. James Centre was demolished and rebuilt with a new £1 billion design by Allan Murray Architects and BDP Architects, and was opened to the public in June 2021. It was renamed the St James Quarter and is able to accommodate up to 80 new brands. While it brought a new excitement to the city with many new brands appearing within the quarter, it caused many brands located in Princes Street to relocate to the St James Quarter, undermining the hopes to revitalise the street. St James Quarter was designed to be in the shape of an eye, with the 5-star W Hotels taking pride of place in the 'iris'. This central feature, however, caused a lot of controversy in the city and even put Edinburgh's UNESCO World Heritage status under threat.

=== Tourism ===
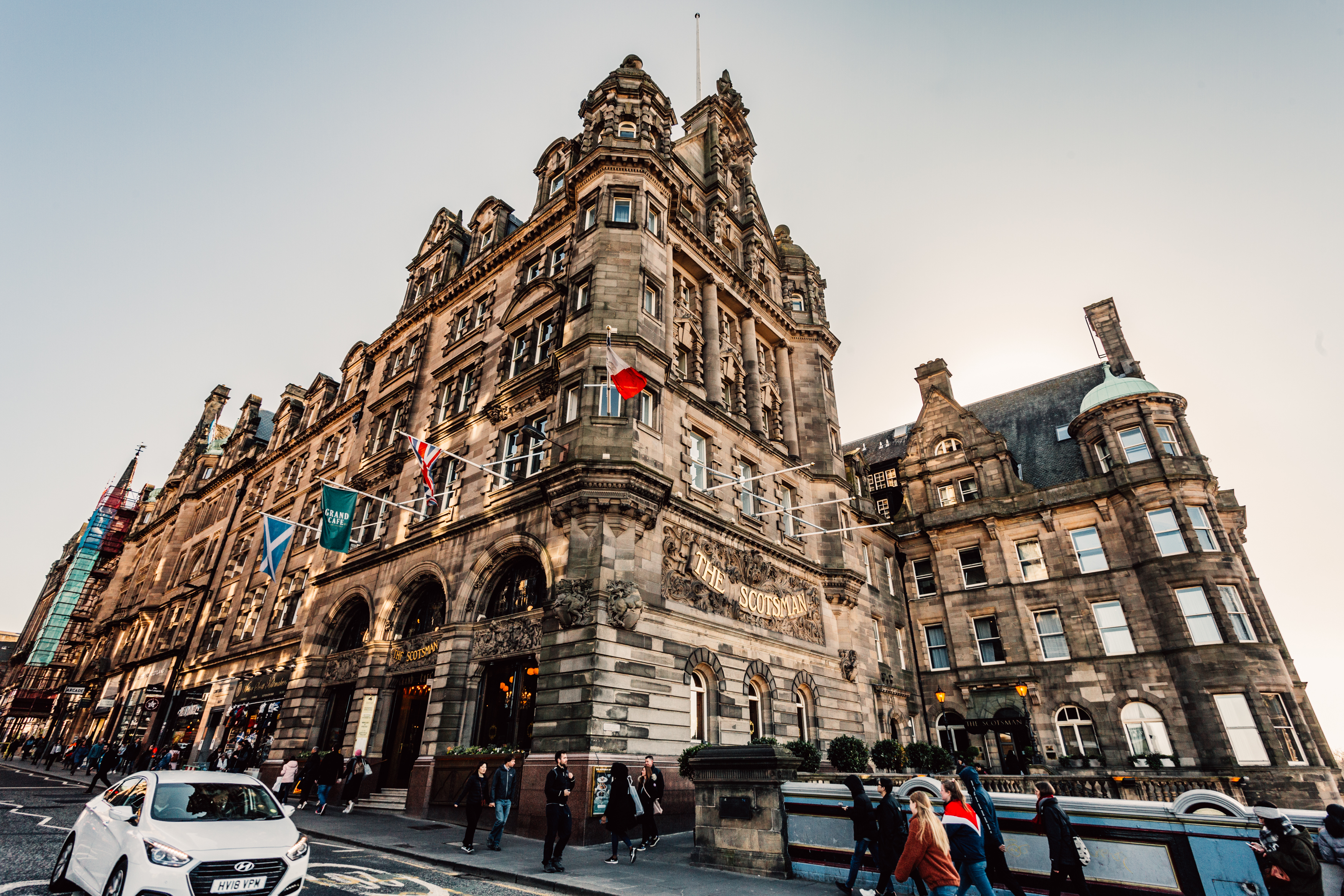
The Scotsman Hotel

Tourism is another important mainstay of the economy of Edinburgh, supporting 30,000 jobs in the city worth £1.6 billion to the city economy. In 2011, visitor spending was £1.16 billion, compared to £250 million in 1990. Edinburgh is Scotland's most popular tourist destination in terms of visitor numbers, with numbers growing substantially each year, particularly in the budget travel and backpacking sector, assisted by the growth of Edinburgh Airport and direct rail links to the rest of the country.

The programme of cultural festivals held annually, including the Edinburgh International Festival and Hogmanay, attracted 4.3 million visitors in 2012 and the Festival Fringe is the largest ticketed event in the world, after the Olympics and the World Cup. The summer events alone (sometimes collectively referred to as the "Edinburgh Festival") generate in excess of £100 million for the local economy.

Another component of Edinburgh's tourist industry is business and conference tourism, which generates in excess of £74m for the city. Edinburgh is the UK's most popular conference destination, ahead of both London and Glasgow. Visitors are attracted by the UNESCO World Heritage Sites of the Old Town and the New Town as well as the history and culture of the city most visible in tourist attractions such as Edinburgh Castle and the Palace of Holyroodhouse.

Top 10 tourist attractions in Edinburgh, 2012
Tourist attraction	Number of visitors
National Museum of Scotland	1,893,500
Edinburgh Castle	1,230,200
Scottish National Gallery	961,300
St Giles' Cathedral	904,400
Edinburgh Zoo	810,900
Royal Botanic Garden Edinburgh	704,600
Edinburgh Bus Tours	511,400
National War Museum	492,700
Scottish Parliament Visitor Centre	345,100
Our Dynamic Earth	331,800
Scottish National Portrait Gallery	328,000
Scottish National Gallery of Modern Art	314,800
Royal Yacht Britannia	300,700
Scottish Whisky Heritage Centre	270,600
Museum of Childhood	237,500
Source: Moffat Centre Visitor Attraction Monitor 2012

== Public sector ==
Edinburgh is the centre of Scotland's government and legal system. As a consequence many government departments and public sector agencies are headquartered in the city as well as the High Court of Justiciary and the centres of Scotland's legal establishment. As a centre of Scots law, the legal profession has had a long presence in Edinburgh, with many premises in the New Town belonging to legal practices and firms. Many ancillary economic undertakings and political pressure groups have thus set up around this new seat of government leading to a boom in the recruitment and employment of public sector officials. The City of Edinburgh Council and the National Health Service are the two largest employers in the city.

=== Education ===
Edinburgh is a major centre of education in the United Kingdom, and has been since the establishment of the University of Edinburgh in 1583, with another three major higher education institutions in the city developing later. Education and academic research (including medical research) plays a significant role in the economy of the city. The presence of these educational institutions also attracts many overseas students (27,005) and those from the rest of the UK (15,270). For the 2021–22 academic year, there is a student population of 74,710 enrolled across the four universities in the city.

Students enrolled in Edinburgh universities
Institution	Number of students	International Students	Rest of the UK Students
University of Edinburgh	41,250	18,050	11,900
Edinburgh Napier University	15,530	3,635	1,005
Heriot-Watt University	11,680	4,135	1,615
Queen Margaret University	6,250	1,185	750
| Source: Higher Education Statistics Agency 2021/22

Life sciences and microelectronics in particular and have grown in prominence in recent years. The University of Edinburgh is a leader in the fields of medicine and law, and was a pioneer in British artificial intelligence teaching. Heriot-Watt University specialises in science and engineering and Napier University in the fields of computing and business, as well as creative fields.

The city is also home to a number of independent schools, with around one in five school-age pupils attending private institutions.

== Infrastructure ==
The city is linked internationally by Edinburgh Airport (EDI) which in 2018 saw 14.3 million passengers throughout the year, which makes Edinburgh Airport the busiest Scottish Airport and sixth busiest in the UK.

In terms of rail connections, Edinburgh Waverley railway station is the principal mainline station in the city serving over 22.5 million passenger journeys over 2011–12.

The city is also well served by its bus service, with Lothian Buses having its headquarters in Edinburgh. Over 70 services run throughout the city, which includes a direct link to the airport and open top buses for city tours.

The first phase of the Edinburgh Trams was completed in May 2014, consisting of 16 tram stops along the single 14 km (8.7 mi) line. The route linked Edinburgh Airport in the West, to York Place in the East. The second phase of the Edinburgh Tram development was completed in June 2023 and added a further 8 stops from Picardy Place, which replaced the former York Place stop, to Newhaven in Leith, extending the line to 18.5 km (11.5 mi). There are plans to build new lines to Granton, the Royal Infirmary of Edinburgh, and Musselburgh but nothing is certain at the moment.

== Challenges ==
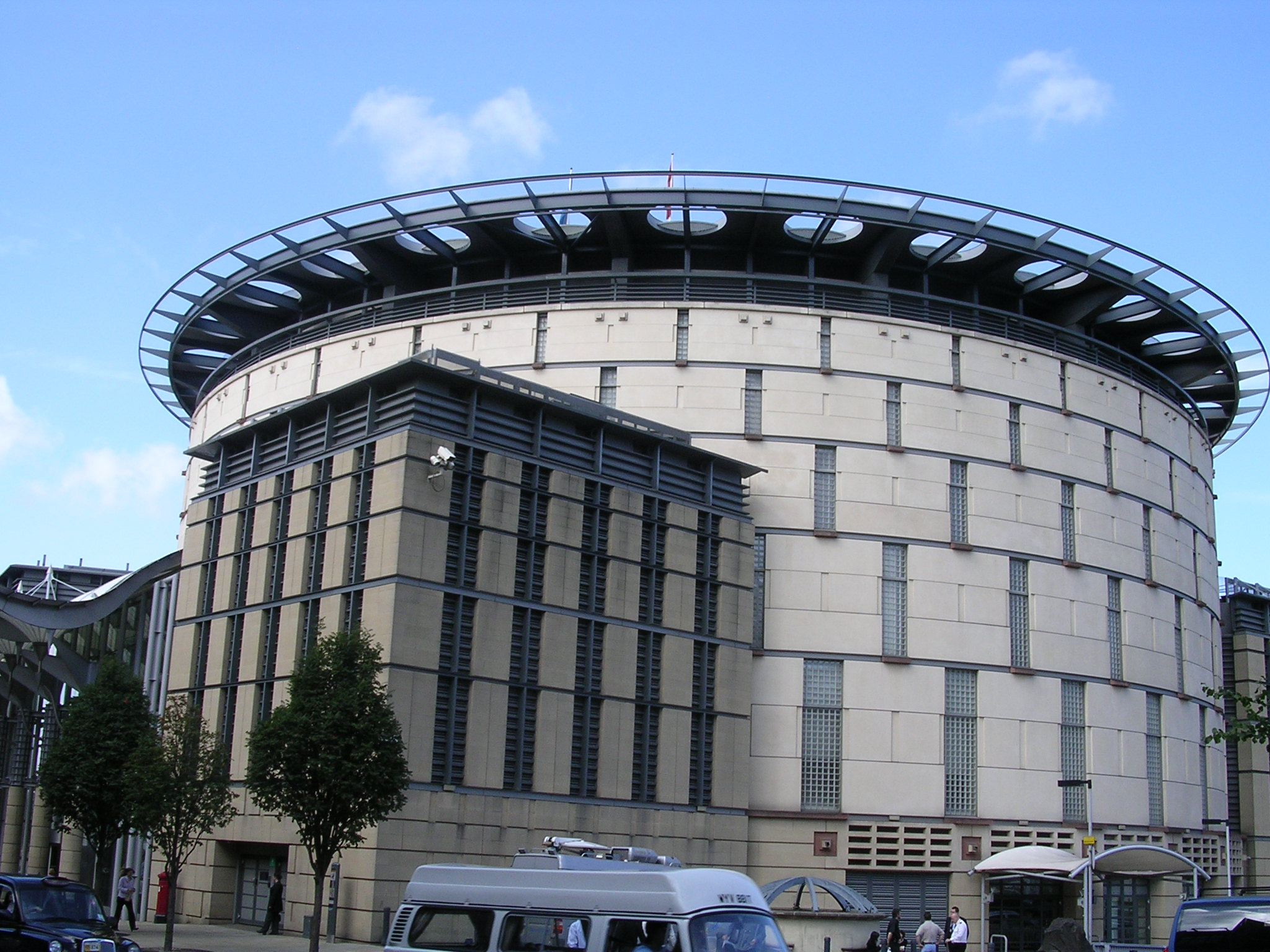
The Edinburgh International Conference Centre building at the heart of the redeveloped Exchange District in the west end of the city

=== Regeneration ===
Derelict land and areas on the waterfront of Edinburgh at places like Granton and Leith are in the process of being regenerated to make way for mixed commercial, residential and industrial developments to further provide for the forecast growth of the city.

=== Urban growth ===
In an economic sense Edinburgh is constrained by its relatively small size, and that there are economic benefits to be had with greater collaboration with surrounding areas such as Glasgow. Edinburgh itself is ringed by greenbelt land, which has seen developments such as the offices at Edinburgh Park and housing and commercial developments to the south of Edinburgh spring up on it.

== See also ==
- Economy of Scotland
- Economy of the United Kingdom
- Economy of the European Union
- Politics of Edinburgh
- Transport in Edinburgh
