= RHA Audio =

British earphone manufacturer

Origin North Ltd.
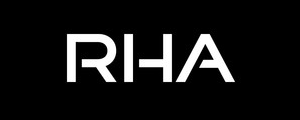
- Type: Private
- Industry: Audio electronics
- Founded: 2011; 15 years ago
- Founder: Andrew Reid and Thomas Lewis Heath
- Headquarters: Glasgow, Scotland, United Kingdom
- Products: Audio electronics

Origin North Ltd., formerly RHA Technologies Ltd., is a British independently owned audio company specialising in the design and production of in-ear headphones.

== History ==
Origin North Ltd. (formerly RHA Technologies Ltd.) is an independent audio company based in Glasgow. The company was founded in 2011 by Thomas Heath and Andrew Reid. RHA being an acronym for Reid and Heath Acoustics. Before 2011 Reid and Heath operated another audio company called Audio Chi which was liquidated and they went on to start RHA (Reid and Heath Acoustics).

In 2016, designer and co-founder Thomas Heath left the company to found Scottish watchmaker anOrdain.

The company was listed on the Sunday Times Fast Track 100 which ranks the UK's fastest-growing privately held companies by sales growth (% per annum) over the past three years and for the 2017/18 season the company became a sponsor for the Glasgow Warriors professional Rugby Union team. In 2017, co-founder Andrew Reid won the EY 2017 Disruptor Entrepreneur Award for Scotland.

Despite being a relatively new company, it has become known as one of a small group of specialist British audio manufacturers. By 2015, its products were sold in 40 countries globally. It has since become one of the major competitors in the global earbud market, alongside Sony, Sennheiser and Bose.

In 2016, RHA launched their first portable DAC headphone amp, the Dacamp L1, with their first wireless headphones, the MA650 and MA750, hitting the market the following year in 2017.

By 2018, the company became the world's first to release in-ear planar magnetic headphones when they launched the product at the annual IFA show. In 2019, the company became the first in Scotland to qualify for a public funding initiative, using the funds to invest in further research & development of its products and in hiring new product designers and software engineers. 2019 was also the year that RHA launched their Wireless Flight Adapter, enabling bluetooth connectivity when using airline In-flight entertainment systems.

In 2021, RHA changed its name to Origin North Ltd and closed its Social Media accounts, and was then acquired by Sonos. The website in the old company name was shut down towards the end of 2024.

== Awards and recognition ==
RHA has won industry awards for their products. In 2015, the RHA T10i earbuds won a Red Dot award for product design, furthermore in 2019 their CL2 Planar wireless earbuds won a Red Dot award for its 'striking design' and 'technical equipment'.

At the CES show in 2017, the CL1 Ceramic in-ear headphone was named as a Best of Innovation Honouree. Furthermore, there have also been awards for RHA Audio's products at the Digit Zero1 Awards; in 2017 the MA750 wireless headphones won the wireless category award and in 2019 the CL2 Planar won the award for best performing wireless IEM headphone.

== Products ==
Wireless

- TrueConnect Wireless earbuds with Bluetooth 5.
- MA650 Wireless earphones with flexible neckband (discontinued)
- MA750 Wireless high fidelity earphones with HiFi aptX streaming (discontinued)
- T20 Wireless high fidelity earphones with DualCoil Technology (discontinued)

Wired

- MA390 Universal earphones (discontinued)
- MA650i earphones for Apple devices (discontinued)
- MA750 high fidelity earphones (discontinued)
- MA750i high fidelity earphones for Apple devices (discontinued)
- T20 high fidelity earphones with DualCoil Technology (discontinued)
- T20i high fidelity earphones with DualCoil Technology for Apple devices (discontinued)

Adaptors

- Wireless Flight Adapter

Amplifiers

- Dacamp L1 (discontinued)
