= Westfield St James Quarter =

Shopping centre in Edinburgh, Scotland

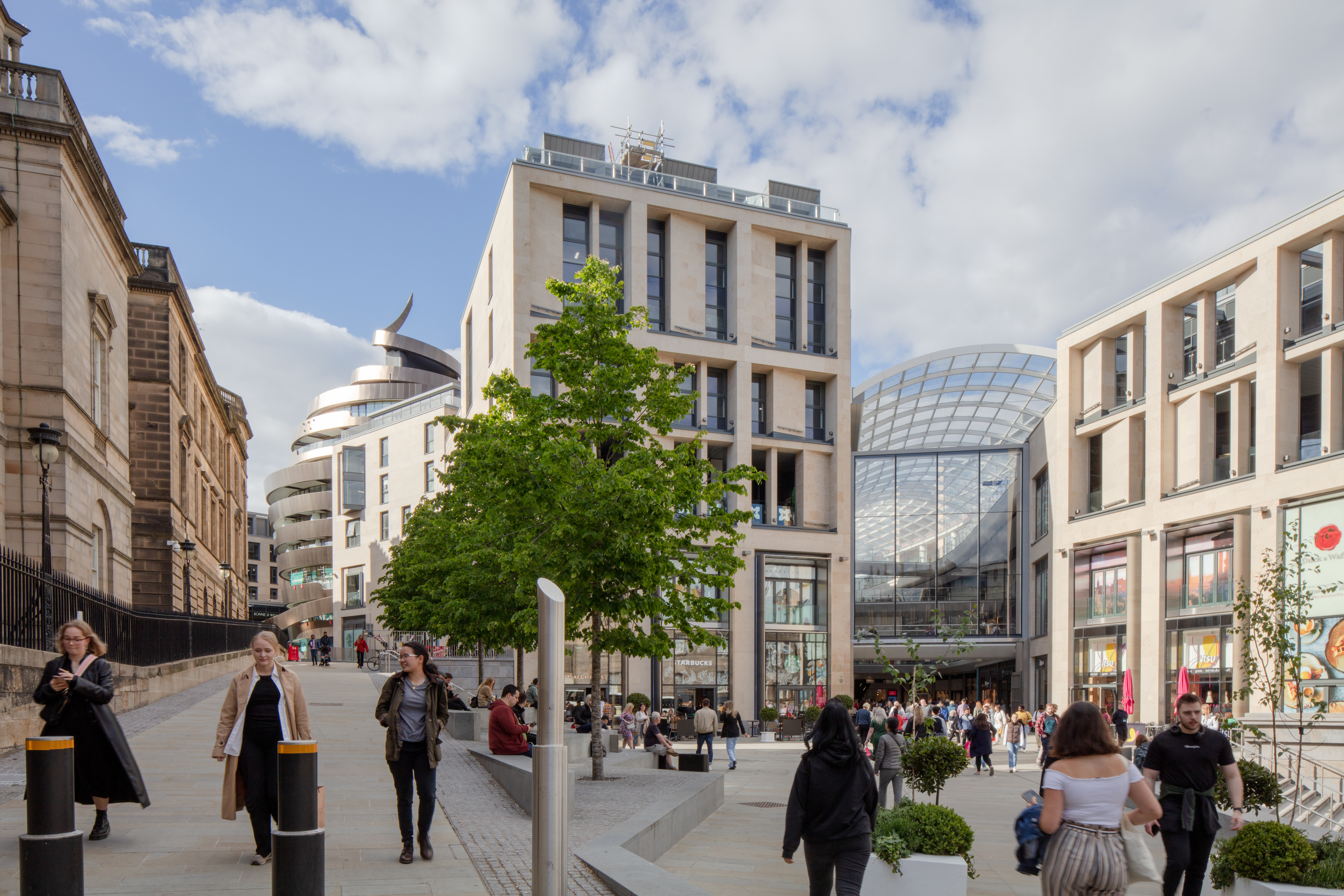
- View of St James Quarter and W Hotel from Leith Street
- Location: Edinburgh, Scotland, UK
- Coordinates: 55°57′15.13″N 3°11′18.29″W
- Address: St James Crescent; Edinburgh; EH1 3AD
- Opened: 24 June 2021
- Developer: Nuveen
- Manager: Unibail-Rodamco-Westfield
- Owner: APG Asset Management (75%); Unibail-Rodamco-Westfield (25%)
- Architect: Allan Murray Architects; BDP
- Num. of anchor tenants: 1 (John Lewis & Partners)
- Floor area: 1.7 million sq ft (160,000 m^{2})
- Parking: 1,600
- Public transit: Edinburgh Waverley; St Andrew Square; Picardy Place
- Website: westfield.com/en/united-kingdom/stjamesquarter

Westfield St James Quarter (formerly St James Quarter) is a large galleria retail shopping centre and residential development in the centre of Edinburgh, Scotland. It is situated in the east end of the New Town.

== History ==
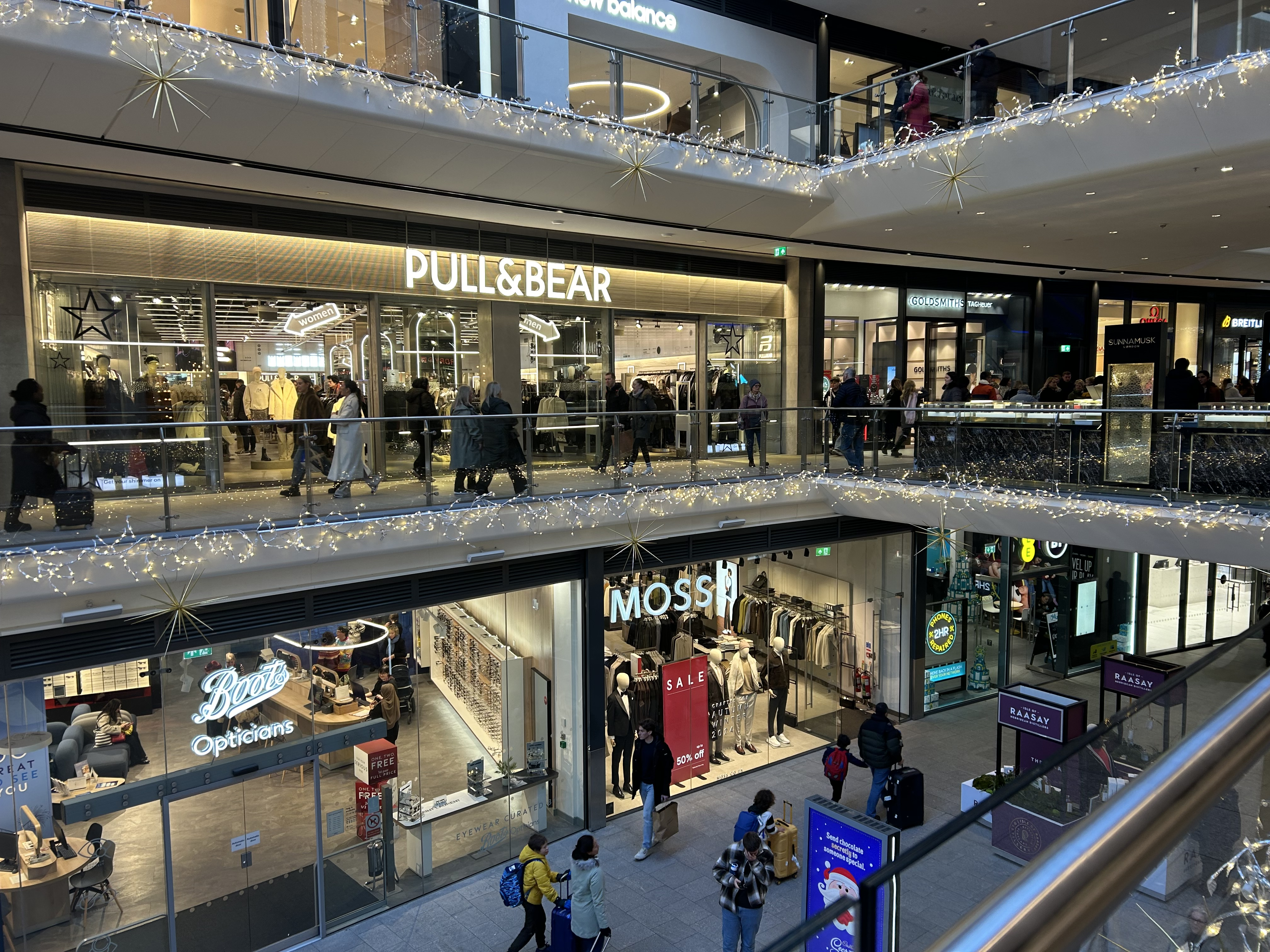
Interior of the centre in 2024

The site is built on the site of the St. James Centre which closed in October 2016 and the adjoining New St Andrew House office, which was formerly occupied by the Scottish Office.

The retail centre opened on 24 June 2021.

On 17 June 2022, Forth 1 moved into new radio studios within St James Quarter.

On 29 September 2022, HRH Princess Royal officially opened the development.

In October 2025, it was announced that St James Quarter would be rebranded under the Westfield brand in 2026, after Unibail-Rodamco-Westfield (URW) purchased a 25% stake in the shopping centre, they would also take over management duties.

On 10 September 2026, St James Quarter was rebranded as Westfield St James Quarter.

== Constitute sections ==
=== Retail galleria ===
The new shopping centre makes space for 850,000 square feet (79,000 square metres) of retail space, with the neighbouring John Lewis & Partners store being the shopping centre's anchor. The retail centre has a capacity of 80 units, alongside an Everyman Cinema and the food hall Bonnie & Wild. The W Hotel and Roomzzz Aparthotel opened in 2023.

A selection of stores in the centre include H Beauty, Zara, Coach, New Balance, Lego, Next, Cos and H&M.

=== W Hotel ===
W Hotels opened the 12-storey hotel in Winter 2023.

== Transportation ==
The development is situated close to Edinburgh Waverley railway station, Edinburgh Bus Station and the Edinburgh Trams stops at St Andrew Square and Picardy Place.

== Controversies ==
The Ribbon Hotel has proven controversial amongst residents of Edinburgh and the media, due to its perceived resemblance to both the poo emoji and a Walnut Whip. This led in 2015 to inspectors being sent from UNESCO, regarding its potential impact on Edinburgh's skyline and its World Heritage Site status.
