= Timeline of radio in Scotland =

This is a timeline of the development of radio in Scotland.

== 1970s ==
- 1972
  - 12 July – Following the enabling of The Sound Broadcasting Act 1972, the Independent Broadcasting Authority is formed, paving the way for the launch of Independent Local Radio.
- 1973
  - 17 December – The first BBC Radio Scotland broadcasts take place, two weeks earlier than planned.
  - 31 December – Radio Clyde, the first Independent Local Radio station outside London, and the first in Scotland, begins broadcasting to the Glasgow area.
- 1974
  - No events.
- 1975
  - 22 January – Radio Forth begins broadcasting to the Edinburgh area.
- 1976
  - 17 May – BBC Radio Highland begins broadcasting programming in Gaelic.
- 1977
  - 9 May – BBC Radio Orkney and BBC Radio Shetland launch as part-time stations.
- 1978
  - 23 November –
    - All BBC national radio stations change their medium or long wave transmission wavelength as part of a plan for BBC AM broadcasting in order to improve national AM reception, and to conform with the Geneva Frequency Plan of 1975. Radio 1's transmission wavelength is moved from 247m (1214 kHz) to 275 & 285m (1089 & 1053 kHz) medium wave. Radio 2's wavelength is moved from 1500m (200 kHz) long wave to 433 & 330m (693 & 909 kHz) medium wave. Radio 3 is moved from 464m (647 kHz) to 247m (1215 kHz) medium wave. Radio 4 is moved from various medium wavelengths to 1500m (200 kHz) long wave.
    - Due to Radio 4's transfer from medium wave to long wave, BBC Radio Scotland launches as full-time stations on Radio 4's former Scottish medium wave opt-out wavelengths of 370m (810 kHz), albeit initially with very limited broadcast hours due to very limited coverage of Radio 4 on FM in both countries.
- 1979
  - 5 October – The Scottish Gaelic service BBC Radio nan Eilean launches, broadcasting to north west Scotland from Stornoway.

== 1980s ==
- 1980
  - 17 October – Radio Tay begins broadcasting to the Dundee area.
  - 14 November – Radio Tay begins broadcasting to the Perth area.
- 1981
  - 7 July – Northsound Radio begins broadcasting to the Aberdeen area.
  - 4 December – West Sound Radio begins broadcasting to Ayr and the surrounding area.
- 1982
  - 23 February – Moray Firth Radio begins broadcasting to Inverness and the surrounding area of north east Scotland.
- 1983
  - No events.
- 1984
  - August – Radio Forth becomes the first Independent Local Radio station to broadcast a part-time split service. It is Festival City Radio, which provides coverage of the 1984 Edinburgh Festival.
- 1985
  - 1 October – BBC Radio nan Gàidheal launches as the BBC's first full-time Gaelic language station.
- 1986
  - No events.
- 1987
  - No events.
- 1988
  - 12 August – Radio Clyde launches a weekend-only chart music on FM, with the full Radio Clyde service continuing on MW.
  - 1 September – Radio 1 begins broadcasting on FM across central Scotland.
- 1989
  - 19 December – BBC Radio 1 starts transmitting on FM in southern Scotland.

== 1990s ==
- 1990
  - 3 January – Radio Clyde splits on a permanent basis with the full time launch of its classic hits service on MW. The FM station, Clyde 1, relaunched as a contemporary hit music station.
  - 22 January – Radio Borders begins broadcasting across the Scottish Border region.
  - 21 May – South West Sound begins broadcasting across Dumfries and Galloway.
  - 4 June – Centre Sound begins broadcasting to Stirling.
  - 15 July – Radio Forth is replaced on FM by Radio Forth RFM and on MW by Max AM.
- 1991
  - 19 October – SIBC begins broadcasting to the Shetland Islands.
- 1992
  - 14 March – Heartland FM begins broadcasting to the Scottish towns of Pitlochry and Aberfeldy.
  - 1 September – Q96 begins broadcasting to Paisley in Renfrewshire.
- 1993
  - No events.
- 1994
  - 6 June – NECR begins broadcasting to Inverurie and the surrounding areas of Aberdeenshire.
  - 1 August – Nevis Radio begins broadcasting to the Fort William area.
  - 16 September – Regional station Scot FM launches, broadcasting a music and speech to the Scottish central belt.
- 1995
  - 9 January – Two Scottish stations do the splits when Tay AM and Tay FM and Northsound One and Northsound Two begin broadcasting.
- 1996
  - 15 July – Oban FM begins broadcasting to the Oban area of Argyll.
- 1997
  - 6 January – West FM begins broadcasting on FM to Ayr and the surrounding areas. West Sound Radio continues on MW.
  - 23 May – Lochbroom FM begins broadcasting to the Scottish town of Ullapool.
  - 6 December – Waves Radio begins broadcasting to the Peterhead area of Aberdeenshire.
- 1998
  - 1 March – Isles FM begins broadcasting from Stornoway in the Outer Hebrides, Scotland.
  - 5 October – Kingdom FM begins broadcasting across Fife.
  - 28 November – RNA Arbroath begins broadcasting.
- 1999
  - 19 August – BBC Radio 1 broadcasts its first split programming when it introduces weekly national new music shows for Scotland, Wales and Northern Ireland. The Session in Scotland is presented by Gill Mills and Vic Galloway.
  - 15 November – Britain's first national commercial DAB digital radio multiplex, Digital One, goes on air to England, and parts of Scotland and Wales.
  - 19 November – Beat 106 begins broadcasting a new music service across the Scottish central belt.

== 2000s ==
- 2000
  - The two Radio Forth stations are relaunched as 97.3 Forth One and 1548 FORTH2. Many changes occurred at this time, including new presenters and revamped station sounds. Forth 2 is redesigned as an adult contemporary music station while Forth One continues to play chart and contemporary music for under 35s.
  - 10 July – Argyll FM begins broadcasting across Kintyre and wider Argyll, the southern Inner Hebrides, Clyde islands and Ayrshire in south-west Scotland as well as to the Antrim coast of Northern Ireland.
- 2001
  - 5 July – The Switch Scotland multiplex launches, operating a multiplex of DAB stations across Scotland's central belt.
- 2002
  - 8 January – Scot FM becomes part of the Real Radio network after it is purchased by GMG Radio. It is renamed Real Radio Scotland.
- 2003
  - 3 September – River FM begins broadcasting to the Livingston area of West Lothian.
  - 22 November – Two Lochs Radio begins broadcasting to the Loch Ewe area of Scotland.
  - 30 November – Castle Rock FM begins broadcasting to the Dumbarton area.
- 2004
  - 4 September – The Superstation Orkney begins broadcasting as a community radio station, broadcasting to Orkney and Caithness.
  - 7 September – Saga 105.2 FM begins broadcasting, becoming the third station to broadcast to Scotland's central belt.
- 2005
  - 21 June – Emap buys Scottish Radio Holdings.
  - 19 November – Lanarkshire station L107 launches, replacing 107 The Edge which had been on air since 2003.
- 2006
  - 14 January – Dance-based regional station Beat 106 is relaunched with an indie-music format as XFM Scotland.
  - 14 February – All speech station Talk 107 begins broadcasting a speech-based service across Edinburgh.
- 2007
  - January – 96.3 Rock Radio launches. It uses the frequency previously occupied by Q96.
  - 29 January – Livingston station River FM closes after less than four years on air.
  - 26 March – All Smooth Radio and Saga Radio, including Saga 105.2, are relaunched as the Smooth Network.
  - 28 October – Aberdeen station Original 106 begins broadcasting.
- 2008
  - 16 January – Celtic Music Radio begins broadcasting a Celtic music service in Glasgow.
  - 29 January – Bauer completes its purchase of Emap's radio, television and consumer media businesses for £1.14 bn.
  - 8 August – Thomas Quirk, the former managing director of Saga 105.2 FM (the predecessor to 105.2 Smooth Radio in Glasgow) criticises parent company GMG Radio's decision to sack six local Scottish presenters in favour of increased networking of shows from Smooth stations in London and Manchester. The station had operated a 24-hour schedule of local programming until August 2008.
  - 8 November – XFM Scotland returns to a dance and r&b format when it is relaunched as Galaxy Scotland.
  - 23 December – Edinburgh station Talk 107 closes after two years on air.
- 2009
  - 6 June – Mearns FM launches as a community station broadcasting from Stonehaven and covering Laurencekirk, Inverbervie, Stonehaven and Portlethen leading to a coverage area stretching from St Cyrus to Newtonhill.
  - 15 June – Some networked output begins to be heard on Bauer Scotland's AM stations.

== 2010s ==
- 2010
  - 29 April – Lanarkshire station L107 closes after five years on air.
- 2011
  - 3 January – Galaxy Scotland is relaunched as Capital Scotland.
  - 17 February – Perth FM closes.
  - October – 96.3 Rock Radio is rebranded as 96.3 Real Radio XS.
- 2012
  - No events.
- 2013
  - 1 July – Bauer's Scottish MW stations start to receive a networked breakfast show from Glasgow presented by Robin Galloway. Consequently, there is now no local programming on any of these stations.
- 2014
  - 7 April – Real XS Glasgow closes at midnight, and is rebranded as Xfm Scotland.
  - 6 May – Real Radio Scotland is rebranded as Heart Scotland.
  - September – The specialist output on MFR ends and is replaced by networked content from Bauer's 'Greatest Hits Network' of Scottish AM stations.
  - 16 November – The Superstation Orkney closes due to a lack of public funding and dwindling advertising revenue.
- 2015
  - 5 January – Bauer creates a national Scotland network for its AM stations called The Greatest Hits Network) with some peak time opt-outs.
  - 13 September – Global hands back the Paisley licence, on which it had broadcast XFM Scotland, to Ofcom when the regulator refused Global's request to network Radio X 24/7 from London.
- 2016
  - 29 February – The UK's second national commercial multiplex starts broadcasting. However, only 73% of the UK's population is able to receive it.
- 2017
  - No events.
- 2018
  - 3 April – Aberdeen station Northsound 2 stops broadcasting on MW. The station continues to broadcast on DAB and online. It becomes the first commercial radio station in Scotland – and the first of Bauer's local stations – to cease analogue broadcasting.
  - 15 May – Sound Digital announces that it will add 19 transmitters to its network, including in the North of Scotland.
  - 15 August – NECR closes after 28 years on air.
  - 3 November – Nation Radio Scotland launches, broadcasting to Renfrewshire, Glasgow and West Central Scotland.
- 2019
  - No events.

== 2020s ==
- 2020
  - 1 April – Your Radio closes and the frequency begins transmitting Nation Radio Scotland.
- 2021
  - 1 November – Argyll FM launches its Internet radio service, the last radio station operating on a commercial licence in the UK to do so. Consequently, all commercial radio stations in the country are now available online.
- 2022
  - 11 July – The Edinburgh small-scale DAB multiplex goes live.
  - 17 August – The Glasgow small-scale DAB multiplex begins broadcasting.
- 2023
  - 3 April – Bauer Radio rebrands Clyde 2, Forth 2, MFR 2, Northsound 2, Tay 2, West Sound in Ayrshire, and West Sound in Dumfries & Galloway, and Radio Borders as Greatest Hits Radio, bringing its Scottish stations under the Greatest Hits banner alongside those in England and Wales.
  - 20 November – The Stirling and Falkirk small-scale multiplex launches.
  - 11 December – Bauer shuts down all of its remaining MW Greatest Hits Radio transmitters.
- 2024
  - 15 January – The Aberdeen small-scale multiplex launches.
  - 1 August – The Inverclyde small-scale multiplex launches.
- 2025
  - 21 May – STV Group plc announces that it will launch a new Scotland-focused commercial radio station. It will be based at STV’s headquarters in Pacific Quay, Glasgow, and the mainstream music station, predominantly aimed at 35–54 year olds, would be available across the main areas of Scotland on DAB, and online.
- 2026
  - 6 January – Launch of STV Radio, with Ewen Cameron and Cat Harvey presenting the weekday breakfast show.

== See also ==
- Timeline of radio in London
- Timeline of radio in Manchester
- Timeline of radio in Northern Ireland
- Timeline of radio in Wales
