= Greatest Hits Radio Tayside & Fife =

Coordinates: 56°28′25″N 2°58′15″W

- Edinburgh; United Kingdom
- Broadcast area: Tayside
- Frequency: DAB: 11B
- Branding: The Good Times Sound Like This; Across Tayside & Fife

Programming
- Format: Classic Hits
- Network: Greatest Hits Radio

Ownership
- Owner: Bauer Media Audio UK
- Sister stations: Tay FM

History
- First air date: 9 January 1995
- Former names: Tay AM; Tay 2
- Former frequencies: 1161 kHz

Technical information
- Licensing authority: Ofcom

Links
- Website: GHR Tayside & Fife

Greatest Hits Radio Tayside & Fife (formerly Tay AM and Tay 2) is an Independent Local Radio station based in Dundee, Scotland, owned and operated by Bauer as part of the Greatest Hits Radio network. It is a descendant of the original Radio Tay and broadcast in Dundee, Perth and Tayside.

As of December 2023, the station has a weekly audience of 35,000 listeners, according to RAJAR.

== History ==
Tay AM logo used from 2010 to 2015.

=== Radio Tay ===
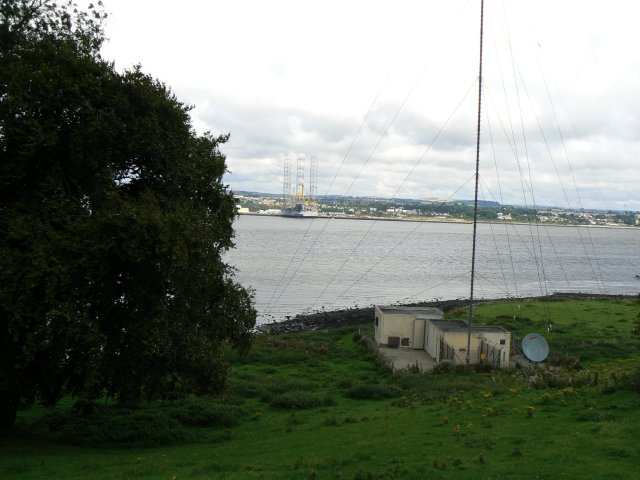
Greenside Scalp transmitter in Fife. This was formerly used for broadcast of the station and its predecessor Radio Tay on 1161 kHz MW until AM transmissions ceased in 2023.

Radio Tay commenced broadcasting on 17 October 1980, in Dundee and 14 November 1980 in Perth with Gerry Quinn presenting the first show from the studios. In early years, the station broadcast only from 6am-8pm daily.

=== Split into Tay AM and Tay FM ===
On 9 January 1995 the station split transmissions on its AM/MW and FM frequencies (until then a simulcast) into two separate stations, Tay AM and Tay FM. Both stations are now also broadcast on DAB (Digital Audio Broadcasting – i.e. Digital Radio) and over the internet via their respective websites.

Tay AM broadcast on 1161 AM in Dundee and 1584 AM in Perth, and was more oriented around older music than its sister station Tay FM, playing more classic hits from the past few decades, along with some of the more easy listening of modern-day offerings.

=== Bauer era ===
A new programming schedule was launched on 15 June 2009 introducing which introducing networked programming across Bauer's AM network. Tay AM retained its locally produced and presented breakfast and specialist evening shows (Tay AM was the only station to opt out of the network in the evenings, so they could continue to broadcast their heritage specialist shows), some weekend output, and Ally Ballingall's weekday mid-morning show, which was broadcast across Scotland from Radio Tay's Dundee studios. Outwith these times, programming was simulcast from other stations in the Scottish AM network.

On 3 June 2013, station owners Bauer Radio announced Tay AM would replace its weekday breakfast show beginning on 1 July 2013 with a networked show hosted by Robin Galloway across Bauer's network of AM stations in Scotland. Local news & traffic bulletins were retained with some networked programming broadcast from Tay AM's Dundee studios.

=== Rebrands and closure of AM frequencies ===
In January 2015, Tay AM was renamed Tay 2 and became part of the Greatest Hits Radio network in Scotland and Northern England.

In January 2023, Bauer announced that, on the 3rd of April, it would be rebranding Tay 2- along with several other Scottish stations in the Greatest Hits network- to "Greatest Hits Radio" to match stations in England and Wales.

On 12 November 2023, it was announced that the station would cease broadcasting on AM medium wave before the end of the year, but would continue on DAB.

== Programming ==
Most of Tay 2's programming was carried from Greatest Hits Radio's network of locally branded Scottish stations with some off-peak output also carried from GHR's sister network in England. Most of the output originates from the studios of Clyde 2 in Clydebank, Forth 2 in Edinburgh and Greatest Hits Radio's Birmingham, Nottingham, London and Manchester studios. Occasional programming was produced and broadcast from MFR 2 in Inverness, Northsound 2 in Aberdeen and West Sound in Ayrshire and Dumfries and Galloway.

=== News ===
Tay 2 broadcast local news bulletins hourly from 6am to 7pm on weekdays and from 7am to 1pm on weekends. Headlines were broadcast on the half-hour during weekday breakfast and drivetime shows, alongside sport and traffic bulletins.

National bulletins from Sky News Radio were carried overnight with bespoke networked Scottish bulletins at weekends, produced from Radio Clyde's newsroom in Clydebank.

== See also ==
- Tay FM
- Radio Tay
