= In:Demand Scotland =

- Genre: Contemporary hits
- Running time: 180 minutes
- Country of origin: Scotland
- Language(s): English
- Home station: Clyde 1
- Syndicates: Forth One; Northsound 1 Radio Borders; Tay FM; West FM
- Hosted by: Romeo, Krystle Weaver and Jim Gellatly
- Original release: 15 September 2008 – February 2014
- Audio format: FM and Digital radio
- Website: indemandscotland.co.uk

In:Demand was the name of a Scottish syndicated radio programme hosted by Romeo. It was produced from Clyde 1's headquarters near Glasgow, airing weeknights 7:00 pm to 10:00 pm on Bauer Place stations in Scotland.

On 17 February 2014 In:Demand England and In:Demand Scotland merged to create a single In:Demand programme with new presenter Stu Tolan, however, the local variations In:Demand Dance and In:Demand Uncut are still broadcast from Bauer's Scotland studios (Clyde 1 and Forth 1) to the Bauer Place stations in Scotland.

== Overview ==
The show played chart music, and in the past has included interviews with Rihanna, The Saturdays, Lady Gaga, One Direction, Jessie J, Professor Green amongst others.

== In:Demand Scotland variations ==
As well as the flagship show hosted by Romeo, Bauer also operate two other programmes broadcast across Scotland. In:Demand Uncut showcases new music from Scotland as well as live session tracks. It is broadcast on a Sunday night, hosted by Jim Gellatly. This show is broadcast from the Clyde 1 studios to all stations with the exception of MFR.

In:Demand Dance, hosted by Krystle, is broadcast on Friday nights from the Forth 1 studios and plays new and classic Dance music.

== In:Demand Live ==
The show held the annual In:Demand Live event at the SECC in Glasgow, which hosted by Romeo. The event includes some of the many artists which are broadcast on the show, past events have featured Tulisa, The Saturdays, Alexandra Burke, Professor Green, Cover Drive, Stooshe, Lawson, Alyssa Reid, Skepta, DJ Fresh, JLS, Diana Vickers, The Hoosiers, Alesha Dixon, Eliza Doolittle, Alex Gardner, Basshunter, Fugative, The Wanted, Nicola Roberts, Chipmunk, The Feeling, Tinchy Stryder, Example, Wretch 32, Wonderland, Yasmin, Parade, Starboy Nathan, Beat Bullyz, and Carrie Mac.
