= Tiger Tim Stevens =

Scottish radio presenter

"Tiger" Tim Stevens MBE (born James Gerard Dickson McGrory on 4 February 1952) is a disc jockey, working in the West of Scotland since 1973 on radio, primarily Radio Clyde. He moved from Clyde 1 to Clyde 2 at the start of 2008. He presented his last show on Radio Clyde on Saturday 8 May 2010 on Clyde 2, which featured friends and colleagues paying tribute to him.

Stevens was born on 4 February 1952 and was brought up in Easterhouse, a housing scheme in Glasgow. At the age of 17 he started disc jockeying at The Electric Garden nightclub in Sauchiehall Street. Stevens was recruited to Radio Clyde in 1974 and remained a regular broadcaster there for most of his career, with a temporary stint at West Sound in the 1980s. Stevens' first show on Radio Clyde, that was broadcast on Monday evenings between 8 pm and 10 pm in the mid-1970s - was entitled The Aff Its Heid Show.

Stevens left Radio Clyde in May 1975 to try his hand at being a pop star (he had released a number of songs which he would play on his own show with his band called the Aff Its Heid Band, a group of young Glasgow musicians), but he returned to the Radio Clyde shortly afterwards.

In 1987 Stevens was diagnosed with multiple sclerosis, but continued to work in radio despite the steady progression of the disease. In March 2010 a benefit night was held to raise funds for treatment for Stevens. Stevens then travelled to Katowice, Poland for a new experimental treatment of Chronic Cerebrospinal Venous Insufficiency. Stevens reported initial results as promising.

In the early 1990s, Stevens made public announcements for the Scottish football club Celtic during games at Celtic Park. He was sacked in September 1993 for making a joke during a European match about rivals Rangers getting beaten in the European Cup on the same night.

In 2006 Stevens was awarded the Member of the Order of the British Empire (MBE) for his charity work and services to broadcasting in Scotland. He was also awarded Reo Stakis Lifetime Achievement award at the Tartan Clef Awards in 2006

Stevens presented The Untied Shoelaces Show, a BBC Scotland morning children's TV programme in 1982.

Stevens has a fashion modelling contract with Ben Sherman.

In 2012 Stevens portrayed the character Dr Ferguson in an independent feature film Night is Day.

In August 2015 it was announced that Stevens would be one of the voices on the forthcoming DAB radio station GO! in Glasgow.
