= Robin Galloway =

British broadcaster (born 1961)

- Born: 18 December 1961 (age 63); Aberdeen, Scotland
- Occupation(s): Radio presenter and executive
- Website: www.robingalloway.com

Robin Galloway (born 18 December 1961) is a Scottish radio and TV broadcaster. He is Group Head Of Radio Presentation for DC Thomson and he was the breakfast presenter on Pure Radio Scotland until the station's closure in 2023.

== Career ==
Robin Galloway began his career in March 1983 as a presenter for Northsound Radio in Aberdeen. While working at the station, he joined Grampian Television (now STV North) as a continuity announcer and newsreader, and presented a number of regional programmes for the station including feedback series Put It In Writing (1991–94), and Grampian's local & networked contributions for the ITV Telethons, and at Clyde 1 during 1993. During the summer of 1996, he was short-listed for the role of new male presenter in a revamp of Channel 4's The Big Breakfast, but failed to get the job.

=== Scot FM and KEY 103 ===
Galloway left Grampian in 1995 to work on the breakfast show for the Central Scotland regional station Scot FM, which saw his ratings increase by nearly 400%, and helped boost the station. He left the station in March 1997 after a series of clashes with then programme director Jeff Graham. Later that year, Robin moved to Manchester to present the drivetime show on Key 103 with stints at 100.4 Jazz FM, During this time, he also presented for Granada Sky Broadcasting and Discovery.

In March 1999, Galloway started presenting a Sunday lunchtime show on Scot FM from his new home studio in Manchester. His studio was also used present a Saturday morning show on Northsound 1 and an overnight slot on Century 105.

=== Return to Scot FM Breakfast show ===
In December 2000 he became the Scot FM breakfast DJ for the second time, and by May 2001 he had increased his listenership by 55%. He was joined on breakfast by Marie-Clair, Robin also created a number of characters and sketches for the Scot FM show,

- Cecil & Sandy: Two hairdresser from the shop Curlup and Die on Balshagme Avenue,
- Winston: A Jamaican with no morals,
- Shug the Schemie: Shug the salesman comes into the studio daily with his 'special offers' of dodgy goods.
- Old Mrs Galloway and Hector Brocklebank from the wind up calls.

In June 2001, the Guardian Media Group acquired Scot FM from previous owners, the Wireless Group. This resulted in a major overhaul of the station including an on-air rebrand. Real Radio Scotland began broadcasting at 8am on Tuesday 8 January 2002, with Galloway opening the station. Not all of his characters carried over to Real Radio. Marie-Clair left in January 2004 and was replaced by Cat Harvey, who become his new co-host.

Since 2004, Galloway has written a weekly column for The Scottish Sun, which is published every Friday.

=== Clyde ===
After being Real Radio Scotland's breakfast DJ for ten years, Galloway left the station in November 2010 shortly after an incident in which his producer ran in the nude past then-Labour Party leader Ed Miliband while he was being interviewed, despite Miliband defending them.

In January 2011, Galloway rejoined Clyde 1 in Glasgow to present the station's weekday drivetime show. In addition, he began presenting a Sunday morning show on 9 October 2011 for the Bauer Scotland network of FM stations including Clyde 1, Forth One, Tay FM, Northsound 1, 96.7 West FM and MFR.

In June 2013, Bauer Radio, the owners of Clyde, announced that Galloway was moving over to the AM frequency to start a new networked breakfast show for Clyde 2, Forth 2, Northsound 2, Tay AM and West Sound, as part of its audience growth plans. A Bauer spokesperson said: "His new show is an integral part of Bauer Media’s plans to bring the very best programming and content to audiences across the whole of Scotland, whilst also retaining, producing and broadcasting local news, sport, traffic and travel and ‘what’s on’ information from each of the local Greatest Hits Network stations it serves: Clyde 2, Forth 2, Northsound 2, Tay AM and West Sound.".

His last day on Clyde 1 drivetime show was 6 June 2013, with the breakfast show starting on Monday 1 July. His network Sunday show continued until early October 2014.

=== Heart ===
On 20 October 2014, it was announced that Galloway was joining as new breakfast show host for Heart Scotland, co-presenting with Adele Cunningham. He replaced Ewen Cameron, who left the station to pursue other opportunities. On 31 May 2019, he presented his final edition of the show.

=== Pure Radio ===
On 28 October 2019, it was announced that Galloway was being hired to become the new breakfast show host for Pure Radio Scotland, which launched at 8am on Wednesday 27 November 2019 with the Robin Galloway Breakfast Show. The station announced its closure on 12 September 2023. Galloway said the station "didn’t quite reach the listener numbers and revenue that we'd expected" but that "the closure of Pure is in no way a reflection on its brilliant team." He added that he would be focusing on talent acquisition and strategy at DC Thomson going forward.

== Wind ups ==
A long-standing feature of Galloway's radio shows were his wind-up phone calls, first heard on Northsound 1, before becoming a fixture on Scot FM shows and Real Radio Scotland's breakfast show. Annual compilation CDs of the wind-up calls were released, with the 2007 edition achieving Gold sales status.

In December 2012, he decided to give the segment a hiatus as a mark of respect to nurse Jacintha Saldanha, who committed suicide after being on the receiving end of an Australian radio show's prank call. He admitted a few years later in 2015, he was deeply affected by the tragedy. In November 2015 the wind up calls were brought back to his breakfast show with Adele Cunningham as the "8:10 Phone Tap", with some calls featuring Cunningham in addition to Galloway.

== Awards ==
- Arqiva Broadcast of the Year 2015

Bronze: Referendum Live – Robin Galloway Bauer Scotland

- In 1999, Galloway won Gold at The New York Radio festivals, For the Best Breakfast show in the world
- Ace award for World's Best Local Radio Personality.
- Two British radio awards.
