= Scotland's Hot 20 =

- Other names: The Hot 20
- Genre: Contemporary hits
- Running time: 120 minutes
- Country of origin: United Kingdom
- Language: English
- Home station: Forth 1
- Syndicates: Clyde 1 Radio Borders; Tay FM; West FM; Northsound 1 MFR
- Hosted by: Greig Easton (Greigsy)
- Original release: 13 August 2011
- Audio format: FM, DAB and Online

Scotland's Hot 20 (The Hot 20) is the name of a Scottish syndicated radio programme hosted by Greigsy.

It is produced from Clyde 1's studios in Glasgow, airing Saturdays from 12:00 pm to 2:00 pm on all of Bauer Place stations in Scotland.

== Overview ==
The show counts down Scotland's most 20 bought, streamed, downloaded and requested songs of the week with two 'One To Watch' future hits as well as 'Former UK Number One' songs.
