= In:Demand England =

In:Demand
- Other names: North West's Most Wanted (2006–2007)
- Genre: Entertainment
- Running time: 180 minutes
- Country of origin: United Kingdom
- Language: English
- Home station: Key 103
- Syndicates: CFM Radio, Hallam FM, Metro Radio, Radio Aire, Radio City, Rock FM, The Hits Radio, TFM, Viking FM
- Hosted by: Rich Clarke (2006–08); Lucy Horobin (2006–11); Alex James (2009–14)
- Announcer: Mark Chadwick
- Produced by: James Robinson
- Original release: January 2006 – February 2014
- Audio format: FM and Digital radio
- Website: In:Demand
- Podcast: The In:Demand Podcast

In:Demand was the name of a British syndicated radio programme hosted by Alex James. It is produced from Bauer Radio headquarters in Manchester, airing weeknights 1900 to 2200 on Bauer Place stations in Northern England and The Hits Radio across the UK.

On 17 February 2014 In:Demand England and In:Demand Scotland merged to create a single In:Demand programme with new presenter Stu Tolan.

== Overview ==
In January 2006, Rich Clarke and Lucy Horobin begun hosting North West's Most Wanted on Key 103 in Manchester, later renamed In:Demand after a short time. Due to cost cutting, it became syndicated on its sister stations from 2007 replacing existing successful shows. The program is also available on digital radio station The Hits Radio where an extra program airs each Saturday 1000–1300.

Clarke left in December 2008 to join Capital and was replaced by Alex James. Co-presenter Horobin left in November 2011 to later join Heart Solent. James is now the sole presenter and interviews guests on the show every evening. These interviews are a mix of pre-recorded and live interviews. Past guests have included Alexandra Burke, JLS, Robbie Williams, Little Mix, Rizzle Kicks, Alesha Dixon and many more.

=== Live Demand ===
Guests that visit In:Demand usually record live tracks. These live tracks are played several times a week usually after 9.30pm. In August 2009 In:Demand broadcast the whole U2 360 tour concert from Don Valley Stadium in Sheffield.

In:Demand often has coverage live from music awards, for example, backstage at the 2009 Mobo Awards.

=== Friday broadcast ===
In:Demand originally broadcast from Monday to Thursday, with a separate show, Feel Good Friday Night, hosted by Lucy Horobin alone, broadcast in the same slot on Fridays. However, in late 2008 it was announced that this show would be dropped and replaced by a Friday edition of In:Demand.

== Presenters ==
=== Main presenters ===
- Rich Clarke (2006–2008; now with Heart Solent)
- Lucy Horobin (2006–2011; formerly also a presenter on Heat Radio, now with Heart and Heart London)
- Alex James (2009–2014; formerly also a presenter on Heat Radio and Q, now with Key 103)

=== Stand-in presenters ===
- Matt Wilkins (2008–2013; early breakfast network presenter on Bauer Place stations in Northern England)
- Stuart Elmore (5–8 June 2012; weekday drivetime presenter on Metro Radio and TFM)
- James Everton (2012–2014)

== Former In:Demand variations ==
=== Heat ===
In 2009, Bauer Passion station Heat Radio began airing highlights from In:Demand on weekday mornings, with these broadcasts billed as In:Demand Breakfast with Alex and Lucy.

In late 2010 they moved to a new evening show on the station – HeatWorld on Heat Radio. The show is a one-hour digest of the latest showbiz news – Alex and Lucy were also featured in heat magazine around this time. Though the HeatWorld programme in this form was later removed, Alex James continues to appear infrequently on Heat Radio in addition to his duties on In:Demand, which is produced at the same studio base.

=== Kerrang! ===
The Bauer Passion rock music station Kerrang! Radio used the In:Demand brand for a time for a listener interactive show airing each weeknight 1900–2200 with presenter Matt Stocks. The programme had a similar "interactive" format to the Big City Network's version of In:Demand (the show, originally hosted by Henry 'Singing Henri' Evans, was initially billed as "You Own Singing Henri" on the Freeview EPG), but playing rock music and associated features in keeping with the general format of Kerrang! Radio. In:Demand was removed as part of a later schedule shuffle, with the station cutting back its presented hours in tandem with its removal from the West Midlands on FM, though the station continues to be available on DAB and Freeview.

=== In:Demand Scotland ===
In:Demand Scotland is produced by Clyde 1 in Glasgow and is networked on Bauer Place stations in Scotland, airing each weeknight 1900–2200, with spin-off shows In:Demand Dance with Krystle and In:Demand Uncut with Jim Gellatly at weekends.
