= In:Demand =

Former syndicated radio program from Bauer Radio

- Genre: Entertainment
- Running time: 180 minutes
- Country of origin: United Kingdom
- Language(s): English
- Home station: Key 103
- Syndicates: CFM Radio, Clyde 1, Forth One, Hallam FM, Metro Radio, Northsound 1, Radio Aire, Radio Borders, Radio City, Rock FM, Tay FM, The Hits Radio, TFM, Viking FM, West FM
- Hosted by: Stu Tolan
- Produced by: James Robinson
- Original release: 17 February 2014 – 16 August 2015
- Audio format: FM Digital Radio and Online
- Website: In:Demand
- Podcast: The In:Demand Podcast

In:Demand was the name of an English and Scottish syndicated radio program hosted by Stu Tolan. It was produced from Bauer Radio headquarters in Manchester, airing 1900 to 2200 on Sunday to Thursday nights on Bauer Place stations in England and Scotland.

On 17 February 2014 In:Demand England and In:Demand Scotland merged to create a single In:Demand programme, respective presenters Alex James and Romeo were dropped, with new presenter Stu Tolan introduced.

In October 2014, as part of wider changes to schedules on the Bauer stations, In:Demand was rescheduled to run on Sunday to Thursday nights, replacing prior local/regional Sunday night content including Scotland's In:Demand Uncut; the prior Friday night In:Demand slot was used for a new upbeat music show, Friday Night Floor Fillers.

The feature was dropped by Bauer on Monday 17 August and replaced by regional syndicates.
