= Clyde Rocks =

Scottish radio station

Coordinates: 55°54′14″N 4°24′28″W

Programming
- Format: Alternative Rock

Ownership
- Owner: Bauer Radio
- Sister stations: Clyde 2 Clyde 3 Clyde 1

Links
- Website: http://www.clyderocks.com

Clyde Rocks was a trial Scottish Independent Local Radio station serving Glasgow and West Central Scotland. The station was dedicated to rock music alongside sports news and discussion and was operated by Radio Clyde (part of Bauer Radio). The station broadcast on DAB and online for 30 days, but was axed after the trial was completed. Clyde Rocks was a contender for the then advertised 96.3FM licence for Glasgow and The West of Scotland, but however, lost out to the all new Rock Radio Glasgow.

== Programming ==
Most of the stations output came from Radio Clyde's studios in Clydebank.

The stations local presenters were Gavin Pearson (Weekday Breakfast), John Milne (Weekday Daytime and Sunday 4-7), Fraser Thomson (Weekday Home Run), Mark Martin (weekend Breakfast), Mike Richardson (Saturday Morning and Sunday Night) and Mark MacKenzie (Sunday Afternoon)

=== News and Sport ===
Clyde Rocks broadcast local news bulletins from 6am to 7pm on weekdays, from 9am to 1pm on Saturdays and from 9am to 12pm on Sundays. There is also sport and traffic bulletins.

Sports coverage aired under the Superscoreboard Extra banner which was a sister programme to Clyde 1's Superscoreboard. Superscoreboard Extra was on Clyde Rocks Monday to Friday from 8pm to 10pm with Hugh Keevins. Superscoreboard Extra was previously broadcast on Clyde 2 in the early 2000s, albeit known as Superscoreboard XTRA.

Also on a Saturday the station had the latest team news ahead of the afternoon football matches from 12pm - 2pm with Gavin Pearson and from 2pm Fraser Thomson had score updates and news.
