= Martin Ingram (broadcaster) =

- Born: Martin Ingram; Scotland
- Presenting career
- Show: Weekday morning/lunchtime
- Station: Original 106
- Country: United Kingdom

Martin Ingram (born 1965 in Banff) is a Scottish radio presenter, currently working for Original 106 presenting an afternoon show. Ingram did work for Northsound Radio. He first worked on Northsound 1 then later on switched over to Northsound 2.

== See also ==
- Original 106
