= Night Is Day =

2012 British film by Fraser Coull

- Directed by: Fraser Coull
- Written by: Fraser Coull
- Starring: Chris Summers; Kirsty Anderson
- Production company: Silly Wee Films
- Release date: 22 February 2012 (Glasgow)
- Country: United Kingdom

Night Is Day is a 2012 independent feature film shot in Glasgow, Scotland. It follows the adventures of Jason Mackenzie, a 20-something year old superpowered vigilante with the power of lightning and the gift of foresight. In Night Is Day, Jason has to fight both natural and supernatural villains with the assistance of the police, in order to save Lena Dwyre, a medical student at Glasgow University.

The story takes place over three days and was filmed mostly in Glasgow and Falkirk, Scotland on a micro-budget. It was written and directed by Fraser Coull of Silly Wee Films and produced by GoldRay Productions with support from FK One Productions and Artist Media Ltd. Night Is Day features a local cast but also features special guest appearances from minor local celebrities such as Elaine C. Smith, Colin McCredie, Simon Weir, Tiger Tim Stevens, and Lynne Hogan from Real Radio.

== Plot ==
Jason Mackenzie was a normal young Glaswegian until he was mysteriously bestowed with supernatural powers. Now he has the ability to see into the future of anyone he touches, as well as the ability to generate electricity, creating lightning bolts as he fights crime.

Superintendent Charles Sloan of F-division, a special team that keeps the truth about monsters and demons from reaching the population, knows first-hand of Jason’s abilities. His team consists of Detective Inspector Iain Mullan, a rough and ready cop, and Inspector Rebecca Munro.

The Cailleach, an ancient creature in Scottish mythology who wields magical powers and is believed to have formed Scotland's landscape has been freed after years of imprisonment in limbo. Working with Jason’s adversary Mr. Philips, a corrupt businessman who seeks only power and control, the Caillech threatens to wipe out the world in three days.

== Cast ==
- Chris Summers as Jason Mackenzie
- Kirsty Anderson as Lena Dwyre
- Catriona Joss as The Caillech Bheur
- John Gaffney as Superintendent Sloan
- Tam Toye as Mr Philips
- Steven McEwan as DCI Iain Mullan
- Mark Harvey as Frank Stone
- Clare Sheppard as Inspector Munro
- Simon Weir as CS Carlisle
- Nicki Fleming as Lexi
- Colin McCredie as Taylor
- Alexandra MacKenzie as Miss Jones
- Kenny Boyle as PC Douglas
- Dave Wills as Alex MacKenzie
- Elaine C. Smith as Mrs Munro
- Anna Walseth as Caitlyn
- Liz Strange as Angel
- Kelly Love as Gwen
- Vharri Lavery as Sara
- Tiger Tim Stevens as Dr Ferguson
- Eli Ghafouri as Dr Anila
- Lynne Hogan as a reporter
