= Lucy Horobin =

British radio presenter (born 1979)

- Born: Lucy Clare Horobin; 17 October 1979 (age 47); Canterbury, Kent, England
- Occupation: Radio presenter
- Employer(s): Global, Rayo, BBC
- Known for: Heart Drivetime with JK & Lucy; In:Demand with Rich & Luce

Lucy Clare Horobin (born 17 October 1979) is a British radio presenter. Horobin is best known for presenting on Heart London, Magic (UK radio station) and BBC Radio Berkshire.

== Career ==
Horobin attended Nottingham Trent University where she achieved a BA (Hons) in Broadcast Journalism.

Horobin began radio presenting at Trent FM alongside Jason King, and then with Rich Clarke on the evening show which was branded Rich and Luce. Horobin and Clarke then moved to Bauer Radio owned Key 103 to present In:Demand, which later became networked on Hits Radio stations in the North of England, and digital station The Hits Radio. In November 2011 she left In:Demand.

On 23 January 2012, Horobin and Jason King debuted as presenters of Heart Breakfast on Heart Solent. From 4 August 2012 the duo had also presented Saturday breakfast on Heart. From 13 until 29 August 2012 Horobin and King presented Heart Breakfast on Heart London, in the absence of Harriet Scott and Jamie Theakston, meaning they were absent from their usual show on Heart Solent. In January 2013, Horobin along with Jason King moved to Heart London to present weekday drivetime. For a time they also presented the networked Saturday breakfast.

Horobin was brought in as a temporary co-host for Theakston between the departure of Emma Bunton and the arrival of Amanda Holden.

In June 2019, Horobin presented weekday drivetime and Saturday mid-mornings on Heart Dance.

In August 2019, Horobin became a stand in presenter for Heart’s national Breakfast Show, covering for Amanda Holden

In 2020 amid the COVID-19 crisis, Horobin joined a supergroup of celebrities called The Celebs which included Frank Bruno and X Factor winner Sam Bailey to raise money for both Alzheimer's Society and Action for Children. They recorded a new rendition of Merry Christmas Everyone by Shakin' Stevens and it was released digitally on 11 December 2020, on independent record label Saga Entertainment. The music video debuted exclusively on Good Morning Britain the day before release. The song peaked at number two on the iTunes pop chart.

On 1 March 2024, Horobin presented her final Heart Dance show before stepping down from the Heart network entirely, she later joined Magic FM. In 2026, Horobin presented cover shows for BBC Radio Kent. In July 2026, Horobin was announced as the mid-morning presenter for BBC Radio Berkshire, with her programme starting from August.
