= Craigkelly transmitting station =

Broadcasting and telecommunications facility in Craigkelly, Fife, Scotland

Craigkelly
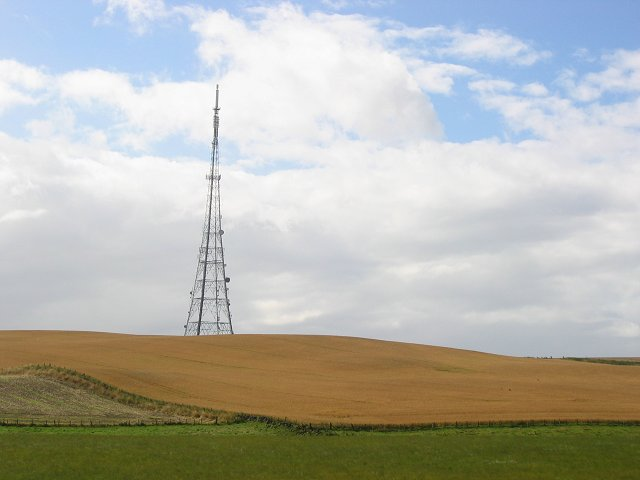

- Location within Fife
- Location: 3QC8+HG, Burntisland KY3 0AJ
- Tower height: 125 metres (410 ft)
- Coordinates: 56.071944°N 3.233194°W
- Grid reference: NT233872
- Built: 1968
- BBC region: BBC Scotland
- ITV region: STV Central
- Local TV service: That's TV Lothian

The Craigkelly transmitting station is a broadcasting and telecommunications facility located at Craigkelly (grid reference NT233872) north of the Firth of Forth above the town of Burntisland in Fife, Scotland. It has a 125-metre tall free-standing lattice tower reassembled after being moved from its original location at Emley Moor, West Yorkshire, where it was used to broadcast the 405-line ITV service between 1956 and 1966.

The station came into service in 1968 to improve coverage of BBC2 to the Edinburgh area, which has a number of hills blocking good reception from Black Hill. In September 1971 it also started broadcasting BBC1 and Scottish Television on 625 lines in colour and though considered a 'main' station, it actually rebroadcast the signal from the Black Hill transmitting station, like a relay. Since DSO in 2011 however, all feeds to the station are by fibre optic cable, with microwave links provided as a backup.

In March 1983 Channel 4 was added (five months after programmes began), however Channel 5 was available at its launch on 30 March 1997.

Its tower now also carries antennas for many broadcasting and private radio organisations.

Craigkelly is part of the STV Central TV region, and unlike Black Hill, the variant of STV Central in Craigkelly is the East variant, so there is regional news and commercials for the Edinburgh area.

The transmitter was originally an A group but has become a K group (or wideband) with the advent of Channel 5 and Digital. Craigkelly is one of the few main transmitters which did not return to its original group at Digital Switchover (DSO). However, when Craigkelly went through its 700 MHz clearance in October 2018 all of the main 6 muxes returned to the A group, the only two outside being muxes 7 and 8, which were switched off between 2020 and 2022.

The tower can be clearly seen from many parts of Edinburgh across the Firth of Forth on its prominent position atop the hill known as The Binn.

== Coverage ==
Television reception from Craigkelly includes a wide area stretching from Stirling and Falkirk in the central belt, eastwards to Crail in Fife and Dunbar in Lothian and southwards to Peebles in Scottish Borders. Kirkcaldy and Glenrothes also receive a strong signal, as does most of the principal city of Edinburgh.

== Transmitted services ==
=== Analogue radio ===
| Frequency | kW | Service |
|---|---|---|
| 97.3 MHz | 9.8 | Forth 1 |
| 101.1 MHz | 10 | Heart Scotland |
| 104.1 MHz | 5 | BBC Radio nan Gaidheal |
| 105.7 MHz | 10 | Capital Scotland |

=== Digital radio ===
| Frequency | Block | kW | Operator |
|---|---|---|---|
| 222.064 MHz | 11D | 0.78 | Switch Scotland |
| 223.936 MHz | 12A | 6.8 | Digital One |
| 225.648 MHz | 12B | 5 | BBC National DAB |
| 229.072 MHz | 12D | 1 | Bauer Edinburgh |

=== Digital television ===
| Frequency | UHF | kW | Operator | System |
|---|---|---|---|---|
| 474.166 MHz | 21+ | 20 | PSB3 (BBC B) | DVB-T2 |
| 498.000 MHz | 24 | 20 | PSB2 (D3&4) | DVB-T |
| 522.000 MHz | 27 | 20 | PSB1 (BBC A) | DVB-T |
| 538.000 MHz | 29 | 10 | COM4 (SDN) | DVB-T |
| 554.000 MHz | 31 | 10 | COM5 (ARQ A) | DVB-T |
| 562.000 MHz | 32 | 5 | LTVmux | DVB-T |
| 602.000 MHz | 37 | 10 | COM6 (ARQ B) | DVB-T |

=== Before switchover ===
| Frequency | UHF | kW | Operator |
|---|---|---|---|
| 489.833 MHz | 23- | 4 | SDN (Mux A) |
| 513.833 MHz | 26- | 4 | BBC (Mux B) |
| 538.000 MHz | 29 | 4 | Digital 3&4 (Mux 2) |
| 570.000 MHz | 33 | 4 | BBC (Mux 1) |
| 618.000 MHz | 39 | 2 | Arqiva (Mux D) |
| 642.000 MHz | 42 | 2 | Arqiva (Mux C) |

=== Analogue television ===
Analogue television transmissions ceased from Craigkelly on 15 June 2011. BBC2 Scotland were switched off on 1st June 2011

| Frequency | UHF | kW | Service |
|---|---|---|---|
| 471.25 MHz | 21 | 100 | Channel 4 |
| 495.25 MHz | 24 | 100 | STV (Central) |
| 519.25 MHz | 27 | 100 | BBC Two Scotland |
| 551.25 MHz | 31 | 100 | BBC One Scotland |
| 687.25 MHz | 48 | 4 | Channel 5 |

1st of June 2011-15th of June 2011,

| Frequency | UHF | kW | Service |
|---|---|---|---|
| 471.25 MHz | 21 | 100 | Channel 4 |
| 495.25 MHz | 24 | 100 | STV (Central) |
| 522.000 MHz DVB-T | 27 | 20 | BBC A |
| 551.25 MHz | 31 | 100 | BBC One Scotland |
| 687.25 MHz | 48 | 4 | Channel 5 |

== See also ==
- List of towers
