= Superstation (disambiguation) =

Superstation is a term in North American broadcasting that has several meanings.

Superstation or SuperStation may also refer to:

- The Superstation, a British overnight sustaining service for Independent Local Radio
- The Superstation Orkney, a Scottish community radio station
- Superstation TBS, an American TV channel
- Superstation WGN, now NewsNation, an American subscription television network
- Superstation, Inc., holding company for TBS
- 910 AM Superstation, WFDF (AM), an American radio station
- RK FM, a Kuwaiti radio station

== See also ==
- Superstition
