= Digital News Network =

Digital News Network (DNN) was a rolling news service broadcast via Digital Audio Broadcasting in the United Kingdom that operated between 2001 and 2008.

== History ==
DNN was the first regional network of rolling news stations. Set up in 2001, the network of five stations were available in Manchester and the North West, Newcastle and the North East, Cardiff and Wales/West, Birmingham and the West Midlands, and from 2003 in Leeds and Yorkshire.

Sue Owen was the stations launch director, with Dave Richards as her Deputy Editor. Richards took on her role upon her departure for BBC Radio Stoke just six months after the stations launched. This followed a culling of staff through redundancy.

The stations ran on a 20-minute menu of news, sport, travel, business and showbiz. DNN also acted as a news bulletin provider to around 30 stations across the UK offering regional news, sport and travel. It was thought it would go on to be a regional rival to IRN.

DNN was set up by Capital (GCap Media), Chrysalis Radio and GMG as part of the bid to win regional DAB licenses from the Radio Authority, who later became Ofcom. Regulations required news and local content on new stations and DNN was seen as a way to win new multiplex licenses.

DNN's target audience was male and female, 35 to 55 and ABC1.

After five years of operation and little investment, DNN was absorbed into LBC at the end of 2006 by the then sole owner Chrysalis. and LBC's London talk station was heard on the MXR regional multiplexes. A reduced digital news bulletin service was moved out of DNN's Heart Birmingham home and into Chrysalis London, which subsequently became Global Radio.

In December 2008, the DAB regional news bulletins and travel reports ceased. LBC and Heart Digital became a straight relay of the news bulletins and output of the London FM stations, and The Arrow became a non-stop DJ-free music station.

== Presenters ==
- Bill Steel
- Anita Clements
- John Collins
- Dave Richards
- Gareth Setter
- Amy Armstrong
- James Rea
- Sue Owen
- Caroline Beavon
- Dave McMullan
- Carl Edwards (ITV News)
- Lisa Dowd (Sky News)
- Chris Blakemore (BBC WM)

== See also ==
- Sky News Radio
