= Radio Tay =

Coordinates: 56.44741°N 2.9720°W

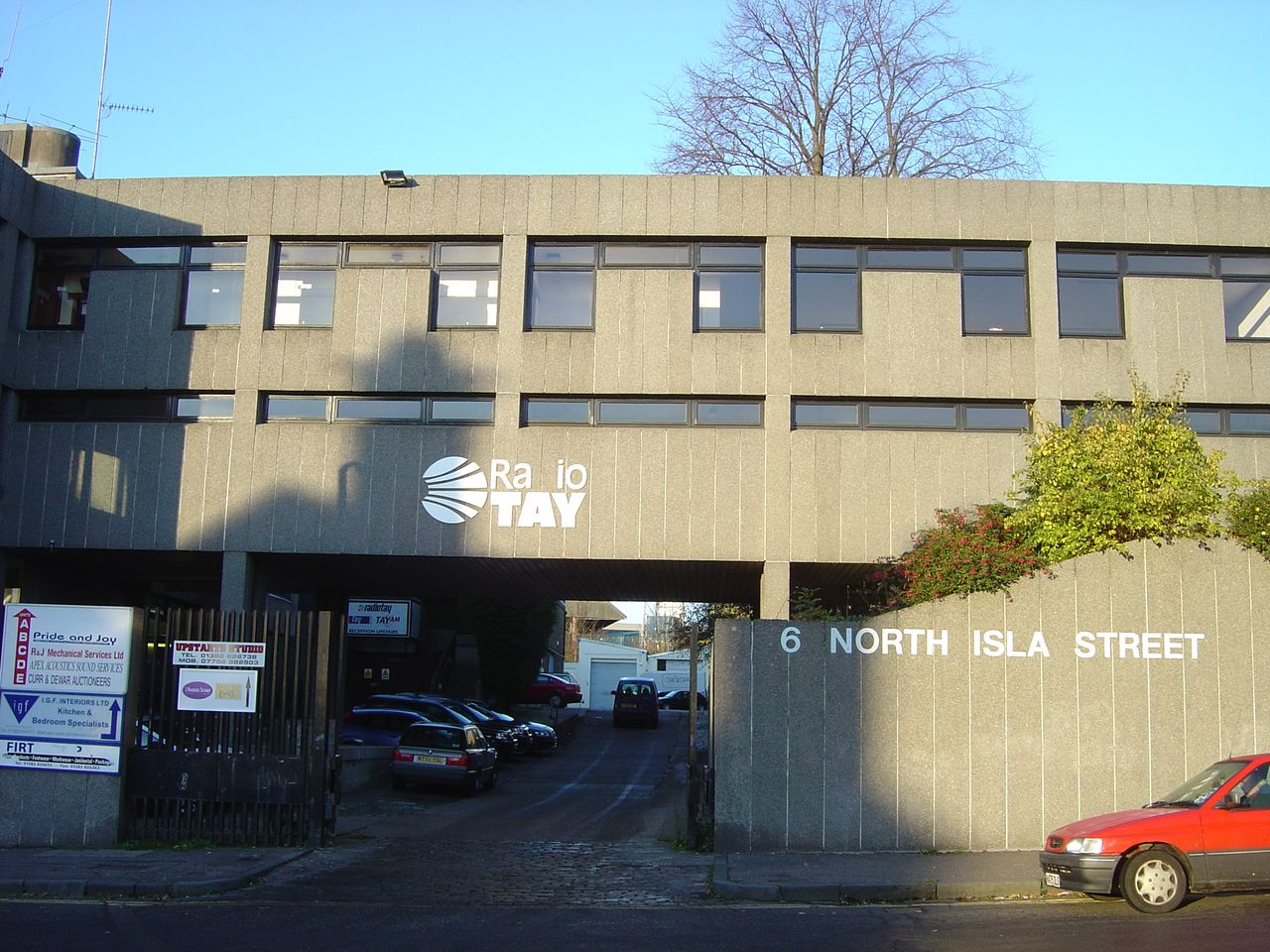
- Radio Tay's former premises in Dundee
- Dundee; Scotland
- Broadcast area: Tayside and north east Fife
- Frequencies: Tay FM: 102.8/96.4 MHz (Dundee/Perth); GHR Tayside & Fife: DAB; All services on DAB: 11B

Programming
- Format: Tay FM: CHR/Pop; GHR Tayside & Fife: Classic Hits

Ownership
- Owner: Bauer Media Audio UK

History
- First air date: 17 October 1980 (Dundee); 14 November 1980 (Perth); 9 January 1995 (Tay AM/Tay FM)

Links
- Webcast: Yes
- Website: Radio Tay

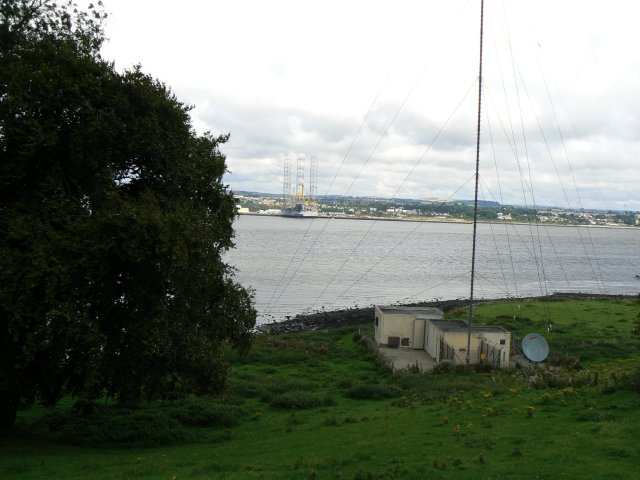
Greenside Scalp transmitting station. This formerly transmitted Radio Tay, Tay AM and Tay 2 on 1161 kHz MW until AM transmissions ceased in late 2023.

Radio Tay is a group of two Independent Local Radio stations serving Tayside and northeast Fife in Scotland.

Formerly a station in its own right, in 1995 the original Radio Tay was split into Tay FM and Tay AM (the latter known today as Greatest Hits Radio Tayside & Fife).

Radio Tay is owned and operated by Bauer Radio and forms part of Bauer's Hits Radio and Greatest Hits Radio network of radio stations. Radio Tay was formerly based at 6 North Isla Street in Dundee, however due to the station vacating the premises, now their only dedicated local show for the Tayside area (weekday breakfast) is broadcast from Radio Forth's studio in Edinburgh.

== History ==
=== Early years as Radio Tay ===
Tayside Sound Limited was incorporated on 27 April 1979 to set up a radio station in accordance with the then regulatory body, the Independent Broadcasting Authority.

Radio Tay commenced broadcasting on Friday 17 October 1980 from the Taybridge TV transmitter site at the southern end of the Tay Road Bridge on 95.8 MHz FM and an AM transmitter on 1161 kHz at Greenside Scalp close to the Taybridge site but located lower down, at the shoreline of the River Tay. Relay transmitters in Perth opened on 14 November 1980 – FM on 96.4 MHz from the existing Perth TV transmitter on Craigie Hill on the SE edge of the city and a new AM transmitter on 1584 kHz at Friarton Road, also on the southern perimeter.

The Taybridge FM transmitter changed frequency to 102.8 MHz as part of a European agreement to reallocate FM frequencies. The 95.8 MHz having been allocated to BBC Radio 4 in Scotland.

The 102.8 MHz transmissions from Taybridge were moved to the larger Angus TV transmitter site, near Tealing, on 10 February 1994. The Taybridge transmitter became a relay site and changed to the same frequency as the Perth relay transmitter (96.4 MHz)

=== Split into Tay FM and Tay FM ===
Originally launched as a simulcast station on AM and FM, Radio Tay split into two distinct radio services on 9 January 1995: Tay FM, playing contemporary hit music and Tay AM, carrying an older selection of classic hits.

These stations broadcast to the Tayside catchment area, with a potential target audience of 391,000 people.

=== Tay 3 ===
On 19 January 2015, Bauer launched Tay 3 on DAB alongside similar "City 3" stations elsewhere. These were locally branded but with content itself (other than opt-outs) taken from the same UK-wide feed based on existing station The Hits. They were pop services aimed at 15- to 25-year-olds.

Tay 3 ended in September 2017 when it and the other "City 3" stations reverted to "The Hits" branding.

=== Recent years and current programming ===
As of Q1 2024, Tay FM has a weekly reach of 110,000 listeners (source: RAJAR).

Radio Tay's locally targeted programming for Tayside on Tay FM consists of 4 hours per day on weekdays (Breakfast 6-10am). Greatest Hits Radio (Tayside & Fife) (formerly Tay 2) produces no shows intended specifically for the Tayside area. Both stations carry local news, sport and traffic bulletins every day. Networked programming is carried on Tay FM from sister stations including Radio Clyde in Clydebank and Hits Radio in Manchester.

== Educational content ==
In the 1980s, Radio Tay featured a number of educational radio programmes as part of their Campus Radio venture, in association with local colleges.

== Notable presenters ==
- David Robertson – former presenter of BBC Reporting Scotland
- Bill Torrance – previously presented The Beechgrove Garden and other television programmes
- Mark Goodier – previously worked for Radio Tay, prior to his career on BBC Radio 1
- Dave Bussey – later presented a weekend programme on BBC Radio 2, once at BBC Radio Lincolnshire
- Eddie Mair – former presenter of BBC Radio 4's PM
