= Simon Weir =

Scottish actor

Simon Weir is a Scottish actor. He is known as Paul Lafferty in Take the High Road and for his role as a gangster in River City. He also appeared in the short-film The Acid House as Tambo. Simon also recently took up the role of CS Carlisle in the independent movie Night is Day (film). He also played Stuart MacIntosh on the television series Monarch of the Glen. In November 2019, he appeared in an episode of the BBC soap opera Doctors as Steve Jones.

Outside of acting, Weir is part of a group aimed at reviving defunct Scottish football club Third Lanark and restoring their Cathkin Park ground.
