= Lisa Dowd =

British news reporter for Sky News

Lisa Dowd is a British news reporter for Sky News. She joined Sky News in 2005, having previously worked as a reporter for Central Tonight West.

She began her career in Radio as a Reporter in Coventry for Kix96, Beacon radio in Wolverhampton and at HeartFM and DNN in Birmingham.
