= Dominik Diamond =

Scottish television and radio presenter and newspaper columnist (born 1969)

- Born: Dominik Paul Diamond; 31 December 1969 (age 56); Arbroath, Scotland
- Presenting career
- Show: Get Up! with Dominik Diamond
- Station: 89.9 The Wave - Halifax
- Time slot: 6am-10am Mon-Fri
- Style: Disc jockey Comedian
- Country: Canada
- Previous shows: The Rock of the Atlantic; Q104 Halifax; The Dominik Diamond Show; Q107 Toronto; Diamond and de Andrade; Talk 107; 1400–1800 Mon-Fri "The Dominik Diamond Breakfast Show"; XFM Scotland; 6:00–10:00 a.m. Monday–Friday "The Dominik Diamond Show"; Beat 106; 1000–1300 Saturday/Sunday "Dominik & Dye"; 5:30–9:30 am Monday–Friday; 102.1 The Edge; Jack FM Calgary Morning Show

Dominik Paul Diamond (born 31 December 1969) is a Scottish television, radio presenter and newspaper columnist. He was the original presenter of Channel 4's video gaming programme GamesMaster before later hosting The Dominik Diamond Breakfast Show on XFM Scotland and as a columnist for the Daily Star. After moving to Canada in 2009, he has hosted radio shows for stations in Toronto, Halifax and Calgary, where he was host of the Morning Show on Jack FM from 2015 to 2018.

== Early life ==
Born in Arbroath, Scotland, Diamond attended Strathallan School in Forgandenny, Perthshire. He studied drama at Bristol University, where he was a contemporary of David Walliams and Simon Pegg. Diamond, Walliams and Pegg were part of a comedy troupe called David Icke and the Orphans of Jesus.

Walliams and Diamond fell out after Walliams and Matt Lucas appeared as guests on Diamond's Paramount show Dom'n'Kirk's Night O Plenty – after which Diamond said that Walliams and Lucas were "complete arseholes" on the show. In a 2007 interview Diamond said that he had not spoken to Walliams since, whom he described as both a "comic genius" and a "twat".

== Television and publications ==
Diamond's biggest role on television came presenting 6 series of Channel 4's computer and video game show GamesMaster, which ran from 1992 to 1998. Diamond did not present the show's third series, following disagreements with the show's creators about Diamond's desire to pursue business opportunities outside GamesMaster and the appointment of McDonald's as the show's sponsor. He returned as host from season 4 onwards. He went on to present the short-lived BBC Scotland panel show Caledonia McBrains in 2002. He presented When Games Attack from 2004 to 2005, a British TV show focused on video games.

In 2006, Diamond filmed a Five documentary, Crucify Me. During filming, he took part in the annual Holy Week re-enactment of the crucifixion at San Pedro Cutud in the Philippines. However, he backed down at the last minute, breaking into tears.

Diamond appeared on the Discovery Real Time programme, Rubble Trouble, which charts the development of his house extension. While residing in Brighton from 2002 to 2004, he trained and worked as a bus driver with the local transport company Brighton and Hove Bus Company, recording his thoughts and feelings for a documentary to be shown on UK television Channel 5. Similarly to Diamond, many celebrities have worked for Brighton and Hove Bus Company, some of which are named on the front of the city's buses.

Diamond's autobiography, Celtic & Me: Confessions From the Jungle was published in the UK by Black & White Publishing in August 2010. The book is a combination of media memoir and the story of Diamond's life as a fan of Celtic Football Club. In 2015, he became one of 44 financial backers for the short film Autumn Never Dies.

== Radio ==
Diamond launched XFM Scotland with The Dominik Diamond Breakfast Show on XFM Scotland in January 2006. On 27 June 2007, RadioToday.co.uk announced that Diamond had joined Talk 107 to cover a number of programmes over the summer months. From 13 October 2007 Diamond presented The Dominik Diamond Breakfast Club on Talk 107. In January 2008 Dominik took over Talk 107 Drive with Marisa de Andrade. In April 2008, following a station revamp, the show became known as Diamond and de Andrade. Diamond left Talk 107 in 2008 with the station closing that Christmas.

He hosted The Dominik Diamond Show Mon–Fri 6–11pm on Q107 in Toronto. After a stint hosting on new music station Radio 96.5 in Halifax, Nova Scotia, Diamond returned to the Toronto market in March 2014, replacing Dean Blundell as host of the morning show on 102.1 the Edge. From September 2015 to November 2018 he was the Morning Show host on 96.9 Jack FM in Calgary. In April 2020 during the COVID-19 lockdown, Dominik started a livestream channel on Twitch.

== Personal life ==
Diamond is a lifelong fan of Celtic F.C.
