= David Robertson (broadcaster) =

British journalist and newsreader (born 1965)

David Robertson (born 1965 in Dundee) is a Scottish former journalist and newsreader for Reporting Scotland from 2000 to 2008.

== Career ==
Robertson's career began at Dundee radio station Radio Tay. He joined the British Broadcasting Corporation (BBC) in the late 1980s, as a reporter and correspondent, covering the Bosnian War from Sarajevo and reporting from the US, Germany and Spain. He was also a presenter in the early days of BBC News 24 on the Breakfast show. From 2000 to 2008, Robertson worked as a presenter on Reporting Scotland, joining established presenters Jackie Bird and Sally Magnusson. Briefly during this period he also had a news quiz show on BBC Radio Scotland. On Friday 19 September 2008, he announced that he had been with the BBC for twenty years, presenting Reporting Scotland for eight, was honoured to have done so, and that this was his last appearance.

It emerged that the BBC had ended his employment. Press reports claimed he sought a compensatory pay-off from BBC Scotland on the grounds that he was sacked by the corporation, rather than resigning.

Robertson was head of public affairs for the Wise Group, a social enterprise aiming to provide work focused solutions to social exclusion through employment, regeneration and sustainable development. He has recently worked for the Cell Therapy Catapult as head of communications and marketing, and is currently head of public relations, EMEA for the US biotech company, Illumina.

== Popular culture ==
In January 2008, David Robertson's apparently regular on-air pen trick during Reporting Scotland was spotted and highlighted in the media and on YouTube by Scottish comedian Limmy.
