= Matt Wilkinson (radio presenter) =

British radio presenter and continuity announcer

Matthew John Wilkinson (born 1981/1982) is a British radio presenter and television continuity announcer.

== Education ==
Wilkinson comes from London. He studied at university in Newcastle upon Tyne. He holds an undergraduate degree in psychology.

== Career ==
At the age of 15, Wilkinson presented on hospital radio for St Helier Hospital in the London Borough of Sutton.

Early in his career, Wilkinson worked at Century Northeast in North East England (where in 2005 he was the presenter of the drivetime show) and 100.7 Heart FM in the West Midlands. On the 5th of February 2007, he began working at Trent FM in Nottingham.

However, in December 2007, Wilkinson was hired to present a show on Heart 106.2 in London between 7pm and 10pm on weekdays, replacing Paul Hayes. In late 2009, this show was broadcast across the Heart network from Monday to Thursday, with Wilkinson presenting Club Classics on Fridays from 7pm to 10pm, although in November 2009, Simon Dale took over the show. As of 2010, Wilkinson was presenting a show between 6am and 8am on weekend mornings nationally on the Heart network of radio stations. As of 2013, he was presenting on weekdays between 4am and 6am nationally on the Heart network. As of 2014, he was presenting between 1pm and 4pm on weekdays nationally on the Heart network, with a Time Tunnel, a focus on the music of one year, taking place after 2pm. As of 2016, Wilkinson's show contained an hour of exclusively happy, upbeat pop music (from the same decades as the other hours) between 2pm and 3pm; the show However, from 2017, due to a change in the Heart network's playlist, the entire show has contained happy, upbeat pop music. From 2019 he also presented a show between 12pm and 4pm nationally on Heart. He now no longer presents in that slot. Wilkinson has in the past also presented a show between 4pm and 7pm on Saturdays nationally on Heart. Wilkinson still presents between 1pm and 4pm on weekdays nationally on Heart; however, Wilkinson is not heard on Heart Scotland, on which another presenter presents.

Wilkinson has in the past stood in as host of the Big Top 40 show, which was previously broadcast across several commercial radio networks but is now broadcast only on the radio stations of the Heart network and Capital network.

In the first half of the 2010s, Wilkinson created and presented a series of podcasts for the UK mental health charity Mind in which he interviewed sufferers of mental health problems about their experiences of mental health problems. He was on the panel of judges for the Mind Media Awards 2012.

Wilkinson is a continuity announcer for the television channel TLC (also known as The Learning Channel). He has also provided voiceovers for advertisements in both the audio and video advertisements formats.
