= Richard Clarke (radio personality) =

British radio presenter

Richard "Rich" Clarke is an English radio presenter, podcast creator, host and DJ from Worcester, England.

== University ==
Clarke attended Royal Holloway, University of London where he studied Geography. Whilst at university, Clarke’s love of Radio ensured he took the initiative to create a student radio station - Insanity - which is still active. During his tenure as Station Manager and presenter, the station won awards, namely with the Student Radio Association. Clarke also began his foray into DJ’ing at popular events.

== Post-graduation ==
After graduating, Clarke was elected on to the Executive of the Student Radio Association as a Development Officer, also attaining this position within the Radio Academy. He also worked in Greater London as a DJ and a freelance radio producer.

== Career ==
=== Podcast - This Was Always Me ===
2025 provided Clarke the opportunity to flex his journalistic muscles further. In association with Global he has created a podcast called This Was Always Me, telling the untold stories of people who were unable to live as their true selves. The podcast is hard hitting and moving, sympathetically speaking to individuals who have had to hide their true identities.

Launched in June 2025 for Pride month, the Podcast has been called out as one of the Top 5 Podcasts to listen to by The Independent. Clarke interviews Dame Kelly Holmes and Nick Gibb MP, who tell their stories of shame and fear and coming to terms with who they are.

Lara Owen has said that the Podcast is

"a touching tour de force of candid conversations with both well-known figures and everyday individuals who’ve encountered social, political, religious and personal obstacles in their journey to live authentically"

This Was Always Me was reviewed and recommended in The Observer - “These are revealing and tender interviews, and I recommend them all.” (Miranda Sawyer)

The Times (Clair Woodward) highlighted ‘This Was Always Me’ as one of ‘The best podcast of the week’ in June 2025.

In July 2026 This Was Always Me received incredible recognition by being shortlisted for The British Podcast Awards in the Lifestyle category.

=== Radio ===
Clarke got a break in mainstream radio when he signed to host the evening slot on CFM Radio in Carlisle. Moving from London to Cumbria, Clarke impressed station directors and was moved to the afternoon drive time. He was then offered the mid-morning slot at Wyvern FM in his home city of Worcester, presenting for two years. Clarke also regularly DJ'd at local nightclubs, often and hosted the XS concerts. A further move to Nottingham followed to host drive time on Trent FM (now Capital Midlands). This led him to meet Lucy Horobin to present Richard and Lucy. He was also the station's Deputy Programme Director, a post he had continued since working at Wyvern FM (now Free Radio Herefordshire and Worcestershire).

In January 2006, Clarke and Horobin moved north to Manchester to present a new evening show. The show was originally given the short-lived name North West's Most Wanted and aired on Key 103 and sister station Rock FM. By this time they were known as Rich and Luce. Following its success, the programme was rebranded In:Demand and launched across the Big City Network as a Bauer Radio simulcast show across the North of England. Bauer's nationwide DAB station The Hits also took the programme. At Key 103, Clarke also hosted a Saturday lunchtime show and often covered the nationwide Hit40UK when regular presenter Lucio Buffone was absent, the first time being 24 June 2007.

In 2008, the Guardian newspaper broke the news that Clarke would be joining 95.8 Capital FM to host the weeknight late slot. The paper reported him as “fresh, exciting and well on the way to being a world-class broadcaster”. The group programme director, Jackson, explained signing Richard was part of an innovation campaign “In a competitive market we need to be constantly innovating and evolving to excite and engage Londoners while maintaining the best talent in radio on 95.8 Capital FM,"

Clarke joined Capital London in January 2009 to host the weeknight late slot and a Sunday evening "sorting out your problems" style show. In March 2009, he was joined by new co-presenter Kat Shoob and they presented six shows a week. The shows were high energy and resulted in OK! Magazine dubbing them as “Britain’s hottest radio duo” The focus of the show was entertainment, focusing on interviewing the world’s biggest stars. Clarke created exclusive content, recording interviews on music shoots, at live music venues or in transit!

In April 2009, Clarke began presenting Hit40UK in place of Lucio Buffone, whose contract was not renewed. Hit40UK was re branded as The Vodafone Big Top 40 on 14 June 2009. During the show, Clarke met and interviewed many artists, like Bruno Mars, Ed Sheeran, Robbie Williams, Dizzee Rascal, Ne-Yo and was well liked and respected by his celebrity interviewees.

Clarke had covered the Capital London's Capital Breakfast whilst Johnny Vaughan was absent in July 2009. From 3 January 2011, on the newly formed Capital network, Clarke solely presented every weeknight from 19:00 until 23:00 (excluding Friday's between December 2011 and March 2012). On 2 April 2012, he moved to the weekday mid-morning slot.

On 12 December 2013 Clarke announced he was leaving The Vodafone Big Top 40 show and the mid morning show on the Capital Network. From January 2014 onwards he co-presented the breakfast show on Heart Solent. the show was a great success, growing local listening figures.

From 3 June 2019 Clarke presented a weekday drive time on Heart South and Saturday drive time across the Heart Network. In 2022, Clarke’s drive show was beating every regional drive and breakfast show across Capital, Smooth and Heart.

In 2024 Clarke had a top tier status show, being one of the leading regional commercial radio shows accruing over 500,000 listeners a week.

At the start of October 2025, Clarke joined the team at BBC Radio Berkshire hosting the Breakfast Show.

From 18 October 2025 Clarke has joined Magic Radio for cover. He covered Dan Morrissey on his first day.

Bauer announced in a press release that from 31 January 2026 Clarke will be joining the team at Magic Radio , waking up the nation every Saturday.

=== Hosting ===
From 2009, Clarke was invited to be on the hosting team for the Summertime and JingleBell Ball, before later taking on the role as host for both Capital’s Summertime Ball and JingleBell Ball. Clarke interviewed numerous artists, backstage such as Disclosure, Rudimental, Example, JLS, John Newman Little Mix, Tinie Tempah, Rita Ora, Taio Cruz and Olly Murs.

In 2012 Clarke was invited to present the Critic’s Choice Award at The Brit Awards to Emeli Sandé. Clarke interviewed nominees and winners such as Coldplay and JLS backstage at the Brits, generating on air material and videos.

In Christmas 2012 Clarke switch on of the Christmas Lights at Westfield Shopping Centre, with Taylor Swift.

In 2013 Clarke hosted Help a Capital Child Burns Night an established charity event hosted by Capital.

June 2013 Clarke opened for Robbie Williams at Wembley Stadium as part of the “Take The Crown” tour. Clarke has also hosted the Teenage Cancer Trust concerts at the Royal Albert Hall and DJ for The Princes Trust dinner.

In 2023 Clarke hosted on the main stage at Brighton Pride introducing Black Eyed Peas, Steps, Mel C and B*witched. He was also invited back again in 2024, introducing acts such as Sophie Ellis Bexter, Girls Aloud, Mika and Gabrielle.

Clarke has also been a regular, DJ’ing on the main stage at Camp Bestival

=== Other activities ===
Clarke is a voice over artist and has voiced album campaigns. He has worked in web development with his own Trickster Media company and is a keen runner, having completed the Great North Run and the Great Manchester Run.
