= Greatest Hits Radio Ayrshire =

Coordinates: 55.0672°N 3.6102°W

- Ayr; United Kingdom
- Broadcast area: Ayrshire
- Frequency: DAB: 11B

Programming
- Format: Classic Hits

Ownership
- Owner: Bauer Media Audio UK
- Sister stations: Clyde 1 (Ayrshire); Greatest Hits Radio Dumfries & Galloway

History
- First air date: 16 October 1981
- Former names: Westsound
- Former frequencies: MW: 1035 kHz

Links
- Webcast: Rayo
- Website: GHR Ayrshire

Greatest Hits Radio Ayrshire is an Independent Local Radio station based in Glasgow, Scotland, owned and operated by Bauer as part of the Greatest Hits Radio Network. It broadcasts to Ayrshire.

As of December 2022, the station had a weekly audience of 69,000 listeners according to RAJAR.

The station rebranded from West Sound to Greatest Hits Radio Ayrshire on 3 April 2023. On 12 November 2023, it was announced that the station would cease broadcasting on medium wave before the end of the year, but would continue on DAB.

== Programming and presenters ==
Much of the station's programming is produced in Greatest Hits Radio's studios in Dundee, Glasgow and Edinburgh.

Some output is produced from GHR's Birmingham, London and Manchester studios and broadcast on both networks in Scotland and England.

Presenters currently on Greatest Hits Radio Ayrshire are; Ewen Cameron and Cat Harvey (Ewen & Cat at Breakfast, weekdays 6-10 am), Ken Bruce (weekdays 10 am-1 pm), Kate Thornton (weekdays 1 pm-4 pm), Simon Mayo (Drivetime weekdays 4 pm-7 pm and Album Show Sunday 1 pm-4 pm), Jackie Brambles (Monday-Thursday 7 pm-10 pm), Martin Kemp (Friday 7 pm-10 pm), Andy Crane (Sunday-Thursday 10 pm-1 am), Des Paul (Rhythm of the Night Friday and Saturday 10 pm-1 am).

=== News ===
The station broadcasts local news bulletins hourly from 6 am to 7 pm on weekdays and from 7 am to 1 pm at weekends. Headlines are broadcast on the half-hour during weekday breakfast and drivetime shows, alongside sport and traffic bulletins.

National bulletins from Sky News Radio are carried overnight with bespoke networked Scottish bulletins on weekend afternoons, produced from Radio Clyde's newsroom in Clydebank.
