= Go Radio (Glasgow) =

Radio station in Scotland

- Glasgow and the west; Scotland
- Frequency: DAB: 11D

Programming
- Format: CHR/Pop

History
- First air date: 17 July 2018

Links
- Website: thisisgo.co.uk

Go Radio is a commercial radio station based in Glasgow, Scotland. It broadcasts to Glasgow and the wider Central Belt on Switchdigital's DAB multiplex covering the region. It launched on 17 July 2018, and re-launched on Friday 17 April 2020. The station is primarily owned and funded by William Haughey, Baron Haughey, a Scottish businessman and philanthropist who also appears on air presenting a business-related programme.

== History ==
Go Radio was originally conceived in 2016, as a fully local Glasgow-based radio service in response to a perceived decrease in Glasgow-specific programming on the city's other local radio stations, such as Clyde 1. Its original presentation lineup included former Clyde presenters, including Suzie McGuire.

== Programming ==
All programming is produced and broadcast from Go Radio studios in Glasgow. The station broadcasts live shows daily between 6am and midnight.

The station's weekday presenters include Zoe Kelly and Graeme Stevely, better known as Grado (Go radio breakfast with Grado and Zoe), Alan Shaw (Go Radio No - repeat workday), Gina Mckie (Drive), Joe Kilday (Evenings).

Between 9am and 5pm the station doesn't repeat a song under the No repeat workday.

The weekend line up includes Dance music shows with Stevie Lennon and a business show, The Go Radio Business Show with Hunter & Haughey, presented by Tom Hunter and Willie Haughey.

== News and sport ==
Sports coverage airs under as the Go Radio Football Show and includes live match reports during the season and a magazine show / phone in on weekday evenings between 5 and 7. It is presented by Paul Cooney and Rob MacLean and features regular panellists Barry Ferguson and John Hartson.
