= Black Hill transmitting station =

Transmitter station in North Lanarkshire, Scotland

Black Hill
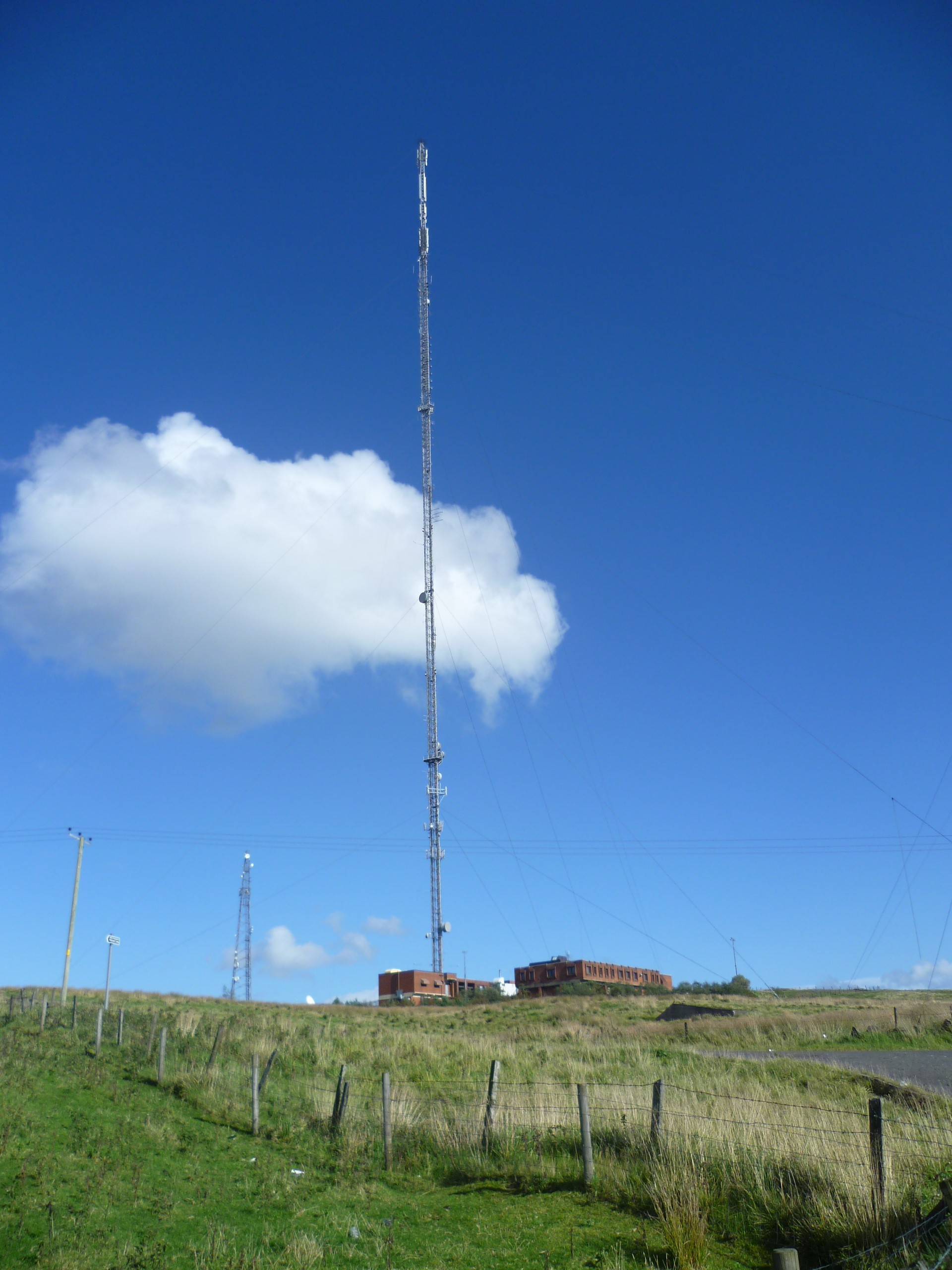
- Black Hill transmitter

- Location within North Lanarkshire
- Location: Salsburgh, North Lanarkshire
- Mast height: 306.6 metres (1,006 ft)
- Coordinates: 55.861944°N 3.8725°W
- Grid reference: NS828647
- Built: 1961
- BBC region: BBC Scotland
- ITV region: STV Central
- Local TV service: That's TV Glasgow

The Black Hill transmitting station is a facility for FM and TV broadcasting at Black Hill (grid reference NS828647), on Duntilland Road, Salsburgh, North Lanarkshire, Scotland which is near the town of Airdrie. It has a guyed mast 306.6 m (1,006 ft) tall, bringing the antennas to a height of 540 m (1,770 ft) above sea level. This transmitter covers the whole of central Scotland including Edinburgh and Glasgow.

== History ==
=== Construction ===
It was built by BICC for the Independent Television Authority (ITA), in 1957 and is now owned and operated by Arqiva.

The present mast is the second to have been built at the site. The first, built in 1957 brought the Independent Television service to Central Scotland and opened for service on 31 August 1957. However, complex anomalies in the behaviour of the antenna caused its performance to be less than predicted, and the decision was taken in 1959 to replace the mast with a higher structure and a more conventional aerial on the outside of the mast rather than inside as had been the case with the first mast. The original 750 foot mast was then dismantled and later used at the Selkirk transmitting station in the Borders where it still stands.

=== Transmission ===
The transmitter was originally a B group but with the advent of Digital two of the 6 muxes then went out of band and required an E group (or wideband) aerial if reception of these was required. At DSO in 2011 it returned to the B group though with the eventual addition of muxes 7 and 8 it technically became a K group. At Blackhill's 700 MHz clearance in Sept 2018 it more or less returned to the B group, but, because its output has (since DSO) been fairly close to the B group at all times a B, K or E group (or a wideband) aerial would work for most areas. Black Hill has the fifth greatest population coverage with a figure of around 2.5 million.

Between 1961 and the end of the 405 line ITV service in 1985, the Black Hill aerial had the highest effective radiated power of any transmitter in the ITV network with 475 kW radiated towards Dundee.

In the summer of 2008, work began on the construction of a second 306.6 m mast close to the original. This mast carries the new full-power Digital TV (DTT) services since digital switchover became effective at Black Hill in June 2011. The original mast will now be shortened in height and will radiate FM and DAB services only.

In June 2011, Black Hill became the final transmitter in Scotland to switch off analogue television. BBC Two Scotland was turned off first on 8 June, and the remaining four closed on 22 June.

== Services listed by frequency ==
=== Analogue radio (FM VHF) ===
Frequency	kW	Service
89.9 MHz	250	BBC Radio 2
92.1 MHz	250	BBC Radio 3
94.3 MHz	250	BBC Radio Scotland
95.8 MHz	250	BBC Radio 4
97.6 MHz	0.1	Forth 1
99.5 MHz	250	BBC Radio 1
100.3 MHz	20	Heart Scotland
101.7 MHz	125	Classic FM
102.5 MHz	15†	Clyde 1
104.7 MHz	10	BBC Radio nan Gàidheal
105.2 MHz	30†	Smooth Scotland
106.1 MHz	10	Capital Scotland

† This signal is largely radiated towards Glasgow.

=== Digital radio (DAB) ===
Frequency	Block	kW	Operator
220.352 MHz	11C	4.23	Bauer Glasgow
229.072 MHz	12D	0.44	Bauer Edinburgh
216.928 MHz	11A	9.5	Sound Digital

=== Digital television ===
Frequency	UHF	kW	Operator	System
546.000 MHz	30	10	LTVmux	DVB-T
626.000 MHz	40	100	PSB3 (BBC B)	DVB-T2
634.166 MHz	41+	100	COM4 (SDN)	DVB-T
650.000 MHz	43	100	PSB2 (D3&4)	DVB-T
658.000 MHz	44	100	COM5 (ARQ A)	DVB-T
674.000 MHz	46	100	PSB1 (BBC A)	DVB-T
682.000 MHz	47	100	COM6 (ARQ B)	DVB-T

==== Before switchover ====
Frequency	UHF	kW	Operator	System
634.166 MHz	41+	20	BBC (Mux 1)	DVB-T
658.166 MHz	44+	20	SDN (Mux A)	DVB-T
682.166 MHz	47+	20	Digital 3&4 (Mux 2)	DVB-T
714.166 MHz	51+	20	BBC (Mux B)	DVB-T
746.000 MHz	55	20	Arqiva (Mux C)	DVB-T
778.000 MHz	59	10	BBC B (Mux HD)	DVB-T2
826.000 MHz	65	20	Arqiva (Mux D)	DVB-T

=== Analogue television ===
Analogue television was broadcast from Black Hill until 22 June 2011. BBC2 Scotland was previously switched off on 8 June.

Frequency	UHF	kW	Service
599.25 MHz	37	500	Channel 5
623.25 MHz	40	500	BBC One Scotland
647.25 MHz	43	500	STV (Central)
671.25 MHz	46	500	BBC Two Scotland
703.25 MHz	50	500	Channel 4

== See also ==
- Kirk o'Shotts transmitting station
- List of masts
- List of tallest structures in the United Kingdom
- Salsburgh
