= XFM Scotland (2006) =

Scottish regional radio station

Scotland
- Broadcast area: Central Scotland
- Frequencies: 105.7 MHz and 106.1 MHz

Programming
- Format: Alternative

Ownership
- Owner: GCap Media plc / Global Radio Ltd

History
- First air date: 19 November 1999 as Beat 106; 4 Jan 2006 as XFM Scotland

Links
- Website: xfmscotland.co.uk

XFM Scotland was a regional radio station broadcasting to Scotland's Central Belt, an area surrounding the two cities of Glasgow and Edinburgh. The station changed format to join the Galaxy Network on 8 November 2008 as Galaxy Scotland.

== History ==
It began on 19 November 1999 as Beat 106, a dance music station. The first presenter on-air, at 1:06 p.m. on launch day, was Matt Finlay, who stayed at the station until late 2005. After launch, Beat quickly widened its format to include rock and R&B music. Beat 106 closed on 1 January 2006, playing a countdown of the top 1000 tracks voted for by visitors to its website, entitled "The X-List".

Beat 106 was originally established by the Big Beat Group, headed up by a group of nightclub promoters from Glasgow. However, just a few months into its existence, in July 2000, it was bought by the Capital Radio Group. In 2005, Capital Radio merged with the GWR Group to form GCap Media, creating the UK's largest commercial radio group. The rebranding of Beat 106 to XFM was one of a number of measures announced by GCap to improve their corporate performance following the merger. The original XFM station was Xfm London and the rebranding in Scotland occurred four months before the expected launch of Xfm Manchester.

Normal XFM Scotland programmes were launched by breakfast presenter Dominik Diamond on 4 January 2006. The first record to be played on XFM Scotland was 'Loaded' by Primal Scream. (The first record to be played on Beat 106 was "Revolution" by The Beatles.)

On 11 February 2008 GCap Media announced that they would be selling the analogue licence for the station.

On 28 August 2008, Jim Gellatly announced that his last show would be broadcast that day and he would be leaving the station together with a number of colleagues.

== Re branding to Galaxy (Now known as Capital FM) ==
On 27 August 2008 new owners Global Radio announced it would re-brand XFM Scotland as Galaxy Scotland. The re-brand was part of Global Radio's major strategy to expand the brand across the UK. On 8 November 2008 Galaxy Scotland joined the Galaxy Network (Now known as the Capital FM Network) .

XFM Scotland's last days on-air were broadcast during the weekend of 25–26 October 2008, with the website warning visitors and listeners that XFM would shortly be no longer available in the area on FM. It advised XFM fans to switch to DAB, the Internet stream or satellite to continue listening, and to visit http://www.xfm.co.uk (XFM London and XFM Manchester's shared website) and not http://www.xfmscotland.co.uk from Monday 27 October.

== Relaunch of XFM Scotland ==
On 7 April 2014, Global Radio relaunched XFM Scotland on 96.3 FM from the Paisley area. XFM Scotland replaced Real Radio XS, Which used to broadcast on the same frequency. This lasted until September 2015, when Global announced that XFM (UK) would be rebranding as Radio X (United Kingdom). Due to the devolved nations rule, Radio X couldn't be fully networked on 96.3FM. Global decided to hand the Scottish FM licence back prior to Radio X's launch.

== Former presenters ==
=== Weekday ===
- Julyan Sinclair 0600-1000 – The Xfm Breakfast Show
- Jo Good 1300–1600
- Des Clarke 1600–1900 – Xfm Drivetime
- Steve Harris 1900–2200 – Music Response

=== Weekend ===
- Eddy Temple-Morris Friday 2200-0100 – The Remix
- Heather Suttie 0600-1000 – Weekend Breakfast
- Danny Wallace Saturday 1000–1400 – The Danny Wallace Show
- Steve Harris 1400–1800
- Rick Edwards Saturday 1800–2100 – The Weekender
- Marsha Sunday 1000–1400 – Sunday Roast

== Notable former presenters ==
- Dominik Diamond
- Jim Gellatly (now at BFBS Scotland)
- Zoe Ball (now at BBC Radio 2)
