= Talk 107 =

talk107
- Scotland
- Broadcast area: Edinburgh, Fife and The Lothians
- Frequency: 107.0 MHz

Programming
- Format: Speech

Ownership
- Owner: UTV Radio

History
- First air date: 14 February 2006
- Last air date: 23 December 2008

talk107 was an Independent Local Radio station based in Edinburgh, Scotland, broadcasting a phone-in based talk format. It was the UK's first local commercial talk licence to be awarded outside London and was the only station of its kind in Scotland. It was owned by UTV Radio and traded as a wholly owned division of Talksport – the national sports talk station.

The station ceased broadcasting at 10 pm on 23 December 2008 – a day earlier than initially announced – with Kickabout being the final program. The station's head of news, Gwen Lawrie, was both the first and last voice heard on the station.

== Station history ==
The FM local commercial radio licence for the city of Edinburgh and the area surrounding the Firth of Forth was awarded to Dunedin FM on 16 December 2004 (Dunedin is an anglicisation of the Scottish Gaelic name Dùn Èideann for Edinburgh, Scotland). Originally due to be launched as Dunedin FM, talk107 was launched on 14 February 2006 at 6 am. The first programme was The Morning Show with Alex Bell & Susan Morrison. On 24 August 2007, talk107 became available to central Scotland on DAB digital radio. The station was led by the former Emap programme director Colin Paterson in charge of news and programme output and the former Scot FM sales director Peter Gillespie as managing director.

== Presenters ==
The original talk107 presenter line-up consisted of Alex Bell, Susan Morrison, Mike Graham, Graham Stewart, Simon Pia, Heather Dee, Gordon Dallas, Micky Gavin, Barry Snedden, Ramsay Jones, Mark Woods, Colin Paterson (also programme director), Stephen Jardine and Alex Hastie.

Shortly after launch, in March 2006, Mark McKenzie, Mark Judge and Adrian Allen were added to the weekend schedule. George Galloway, the Respect politician, presented a weekend shows for the station which was later syndicated on its sister station Talksport from 3 June 2006. Following the release of the station's first set of RAJAR figures, Micky Gavin took over the afternoon show, where he was joined by the ex-Radio Forth presenter Diane Lester as his co-host from October 2006. Scottie McClue was brought in to do the Sunday to Thursday late night show from 20 August 2006.

Alex Bell left the Morning Show on Wednesday 25 October 2006 after station chiefs labelled him "too intelligent" for the format and he was replaced by the "more suitable" ex-Forth One and Forth 2 presenter Scott Wilson. In November, the launch programme director Colin Paterson left the station to be replaced by Mike Graham and, on 1 December 2006, a new weekend line-up was unveiled. Paterson went on to work for Global Radio and the BBC. On 3 December 2006, former Solidarity MSP Tommy Sheridan began a new Sunday morning show. Sheridan often stood in for Mike Graham. Stephen Jardine left in February 2007 to concentrate on his work at STV and was replaced by the Sun columnist Martel Maxwell.

In January 2008, Simon Pia and Heather Dees' drivetime slot was given to Dominik Diamond and Marisa de Andrade, who had both been presenting weekend breakfast since November 2007. On 30 March 2008, Sheridan was dropped as a presenter and he follows ex-presenters, Mike Graham and Susan Morrison, in the station's transformation. From September 2008, the station began broadcasting a live Sunday afternoon sports programme with the TV presenter Jeremy Kyle, networked from Talksport in London.

== News ==
Talk 107 broadcast live, locally produced news bulletins 24 hours a day, including two flagship news programmes talk107 Today at 6 am and talk107 Tonight at 6:45 pm.

== Audience figures ==
In its original licence application in September 2004, The Wireless Group plc published initial audience projections for talk107. By the end of its first year on-air, the forecast was for an average weekly reach of 140,000 listeners (12.5% of a potential 1.1 m), each listening for an average of 8 hours per week. However, in the weeks leading up to the launch in February 2006, public predictions by station management saw estimates lowered to around 100,000 listeners.

talk107's first RAJAR results, published on 3 August 2006, revealed the station had made poor progress towards that target. In the three months from April to June 2006, the station attracted an average of only 16,000 listeners per week (2%), each listening for an average of 2.2 hours per week, leading to a market share of 0.2%. This was the lowest debut of any UK radio station in RAJAR's history and talk107 became Scotland's smallest surveyed radio station.

The station's second RAJAR, published 26 October 2006, saw a modest increase in listeners to 23,000 (2%), with 3.8 average hours per listener and a doubling of market share to 0.4%. February 2007 saw another increase to 34,000 and 4.3 average hours. In May 2007, this rose to 43,000 and 5.7 average hours, taking market share above 1%. August 2007 saw talk107's performance begin to slip, with the number of weekly listeners decreasing to 26,000, a slight increase in listening hours to 5.8, and a decrease in market share to 0.8%.

== Sale and closure ==
On 29 October 2008, UTV Radio, the owners of talk107 announced that the station was for sale as it wanted to focus on Talksport among other things. However, as no buyers were found, the decision was taken to close the station with the loss of 20 jobs.

The station originally intended to cease transmission at 10 pm on 24 December 2008 but decided to close 24 hours earlier than planned. talk107's website was closed on the same evening.

Staff were only informed of the decision to cease broadcasting 24 hours earlier at 5 pm on the evening of 23 December. Mark and Marisa, the Drive Time presenters, made the announcement live on air at 5:20 pm GMT and both the staff's personal emails and the stations website were closed at 10 pm GMT. No announcement from UTV was made about the decision to close earlier than planned.
