= Greatest Hits Radio North East Scotland =

- Aberdeen; United Kingdom
- Broadcast area: North East Scotland
- Frequency: DAB: 11C
- Branding: The Good Times Sound Like This

Programming
- Format: Classic Hits
- Network: Greatest Hits Radio

Ownership
- Owner: Bauer Media Audio UK
- Sister stations: Northsound 1

History
- First air date: 9 January 1995; 31 years ago (as Northsound 2); 3 April 2023; 2 years ago (as Greatest Hits Radio North East Scotland)
- Former names: Northsound 2
- Former frequencies: 1035 kHz

Technical information
- Licensing authority: Ofcom

Links
- Website: GHR North East Scotland

Greatest Hits Radio North East Scotland (formerly Northsound 2) is an Independent Local Radio station broadcasting to Aberdeen and Aberdeenshire on DAB digital radio and online. Owned and operated by Bauer as part of the Greatest Hits Radio network of classic hit music stations in England, Scotland and Wales, carrying networked programmes originating mainly from Glasgow and Manchester 24 hours a day, featuring local news and traffic bulletins.

The station relaunched as Greatest Hits Radio North East Scotland on 3 April 2023.

As of December 2023, the station broadcasts to a weekly audience of 37,000, according to RAJAR.

== History ==
Former Northsound 2 logo used from 2015-2023

Northsound 2 logo used from 2003 to 2015.

Northsound 2 was established on 9 January 1995 as a sister station to Northsound Radio, which was renamed Northsound 1 at the same time, and broadcast using the older station's AM frequency.

On 3 June 2013, station owners Bauer Radio announced that Northsound 2 would axe its one remaining local programme, the weekday breakfast show which was presented by John McRuvie, and replace it with a networked show hosted by Robin Galloway from Monday 1 July 2013 across all of Bauer's network of AM stations in Scotland. The station became part of the Bauer City 2 network (since rebranded as Greatest Hits Radio) upon its launch on Monday 5 January 2015.

On Tuesday 3 April 2018, Northsound 2 ceased broadcasting on AM and became a digital-only station on DAB and online. It is the first commercial radio station in Scotland - and the first of Bauer's local stations - to cease analogue broadcasting in favour of a digital switchover.

== Programming ==
As of July 2025 the entirety of the station's programming is produced outwith Scotland, at Greatest Hits Radio's studios in Birmingham, London and Manchester studios and broadcast on both networks in Scotland and England, with the only Scotland-wide show - the breakfast show which comes from Glasgow being cancelled in favour of expanding the English breakfast show into Scotland.

=== News ===
Greatest Hits Radio North East Scotland broadcasts local news bulletins hourly from 6a.m. to 7p.m. on weekdays and from 7a.m. to 1p.m. at weekends. Headlines are broadcast on the half hour during weekday breakfast and drivetime shows, alongside sport and traffic bulletins.

National bulletins from Sky News Radio are carried overnight with bespoke networked Scottish bulletins at weekends, produced from Radio Clyde's newsroom in Clydebank.

== See also ==
- Northsound 1
