= Capital Scotland =

- Glasgow; United Kingdom
- Broadcast area: Central Scotland
- Frequencies: DAB: 11C Bauer Glasgow; DAB: 12D Bauer Edinburgh; FM: 105.7 MHz Craigkelly; FM: 106.1 MHz Black Hill
- RDS: Capital
- Branding: Scotland's No.1 Hit Music Station

Programming
- Format: Contemporary hit radio
- Network: Capital

Ownership
- Owner: Communicorp UK (2014–)
- Operator: Global

History
- First air date: 19 November 1999
- Former names: Beat 106 (1999–2006); XFM Scotland (2006–2008); Galaxy Scotland (2008–2011)

Links
- Webcast: Global Player
- Website: www.capitalfm.com/scotland/

Capital Scotland (formerly known as Beat 106, XFM Scotland, and later Galaxy Scotland) is a regional radio station owned by Communicorp UK and operated by Global. It broadcasts to Scotland's Central Belt, an area surrounding the two cities of Glasgow and Edinburgh.

== History ==
=== Beat 106 ===
Beat 106 was established by the Big Beat Group, headed up by a group of nightclub promoters from Glasgow, and first aired on 19 November 1999 as a new rock and dance station. Notable presenters at launch included Graham Stewart and Jim Gellatly. After being sold to Capital Radio Group in July 2000 it switched towards playing more dance music, later changing back to a more rock/dance format. In 2005 Capital Radio merged with the GWR Group to form GCap Media, creating the UK's largest commercial radio group. Beat 106 closed on 1 January 2006.

=== XFM Scotland ===
The rebranding of Beat 106 to XFM was one of a number of measures announced by GCap to improve their corporate performance following the merger. The original XFM station was XFM London and the rebranding in Scotland occurred four months before the expected launch of XFM Manchester.

XFM Scotland programmes were launched by breakfast presenter Dominik Diamond on 4 January 2006 with Loaded by Primal Scream as the first song played on the relaunched station. A major marketing campaign was launched a year later in a bid to try to regain lost listeners since the rebrand. By September 2007, the station was only reaching audience shares of 2.6% in the West and 4.1% in the East.

On 11 February 2008 GCap Media announced that they would be selling the analogue licence for the station. GCap later became part of Global Radio and it was decided to keep the licence.

On 28 August 2008, Jim Gellatly announced that his last show would be broadcast that day and he would be leaving the station together with a number of colleagues. By the time of XFM's rebrand as Galaxy, station audience shares had fallen further to 2.4% in the West and 2.6% in the East.

=== Galaxy Scotland ===
On 27 August 2008, new owners Global announced they would re-brand XFM Scotland as Galaxy Scotland. The rebrand was part of Global Radio's major strategy to expand the brand across outside Scotland and into parts of England. Local programming on the station consisted of daily breakfast, weekday drivetime and specialist shows with networked programming broadcast from Leeds.

Galaxy Scotland joined the Galaxy network on 7 November 2008. XFM closed at approximately 3.30pm that day, followed immediately by a 15-minute launch sequence for Galaxy. Galaxy programming started by 4pm the same afternoon, with Gary Spence as the first voice on the air, followed by a special evening show with networked presenter Dave Kelly.

From its launch, Galaxy Scotland gained 429,000 listeners providing almost 3.2 million listening hours per week. In the 12 months up to May 2010, the station doubled its number of listeners. As of Monday 12 July 2010, Galaxy Scotland changed their tagline from "Love Music" to "Scotland's No 1 Hit Music Station" in line with the other Galaxy stations across the UK.

=== Capital Scotland ===
The station was re-branded as Capital Scotland on 3 January 2011 as part of a merger of Global's Galaxy and Hit Music networks to form the nine-station Capital network. Local breakfast and drivetime output was retained with most networked programming now broadcast from the network's London studios. The station also produced a networked dance music show on Saturday overnights, which was networked across the Capital network until July 2012.

On 1 July 2011, Global requested to change the formats of Capital Birmingham and Capital Scotland which have obligations from previous owners, enabling all nine Capital stations to fall inline. The two format change requests were approved in November.

On 6 February 2014, Global announced it would be selling Capital Scotland to Communicorp. Capital's network programming and brand name remain in use under contract with Global.

On 26 February 2019, Global confirmed the station's local breakfast and weekend shows would be replaced with networked programming from April 2019. The weekday Drivetime show was retained alongside news bulletins, traffic updates and advertising.

On 11 April 2023, it was announced that Capital Scotland would reintroduce local breakfast, daytime and weekend shows as part of an expansion of Global's Scottish radio operations. Sister station Heart Scotland (owned and operated by Global) also reintroduced local programming.

== Programming ==
All networked programming originates from Global's London headquarters.

Local programming is produced and broadcast from Global's Glasgow studios from 6am-7pm on weekdays and 9am-12pm on weekends.

=== News ===
Global's Newsroom broadcasts hourly regional news updates from 5am-7pm on weekdays and 5am-1pm at weekends.

The bulletins are produced for Communicorp by Global's Glasgow newsroom, which also produces bulletins for Heart Scotland and Smooth Scotland.

== Former notable presenters ==
- Sacha Brooks (Capital XTRA Reloaded)
- Des Clarke (Heart Scotland)
- Dominik Diamond
- David Dunne
- Andi Durrant (Kiss Fresh)
- Jim Gellatly (BFBS Radio)
- Jo Good
- Stephanie Hirst (Hits Radio)
- Dave Kelly (Hits Radio)
- Amy Irons (Heart Scotland)
- John Kennedy
- Adele Roberts (BBC Radio 1)
- Julyan Sinclair
- Steve Sutherland (deceased)
- Margherita Taylor (Classic FM & Smooth London)
- Tiësto
- Matt Wilkinson (Heart)
- Tom Wilson
