= The Superstation Orkney =

Defunct radio station in Orkney Islands, Scotland

- Scotland
- Broadcast area: Orkney, Caithness
- Frequencies: 105.4 MHz, Online

Programming
- Format: Commercial

Ownership
- Owner: Independent

History
- First air date: 4 September 2004
- Last air date: 16 November 2014

Technical information
- Transmitter coordinates: 58.9879°N 3.0256°W

Links
- Website: The Superstation Orkney

The Superstation Orkney, also known as just The Superstation, was a commercial radio station, broadcasting to Orkney and Caithness. Until its closure in November 2014, the station was Orkney's only independent radio station, and broadcast 'a broad range of popular and contemporary music'. The station also broadcast local news bulletins on the half-hour and national news from Sky News Radio on the hour.

The Superstation broadcast on 105.4 FM from the Wideford Hill transmitter near Kirkwall and online via the station's website.

The station also offered free courses in radio production and presentation.

== History ==
=== Restricted service licence ===
The Superstation began broadcasting under a three-month trial restricted service licence awarded by Ofcom on Saturday 4 September 2004, from the MV Communicator, berthed at St Margaret's Hope. The station was expected to launch earlier in the week, but could not due to not being linked to the Wideford Hill radio transmitter which serves Orkney. The licence expired and the station ceased broadcasting at around 7pm on Tuesday 23 November 2004.

=== Radio licence ===
After The Superstation's restricted service licence expired, the station applied to Ofcom for a community radio licence. Ofcom's Radio Licensing Committee granted Superstation Orkney the licence on 5 September 2005. The station resumed broadcasting under its radio licence on Monday 14 January 2008 at 12:00 GMT with a show co-presented by Dave Miller and Ryan Woodman.

=== Closure ===
At midday on Sunday 16 November 2014, The Superstation ceased broadcasting under its community radio licence, having announced its closure online with just two hours' notice. The station's founder, Dave Miller, said a lack of public funding and dwindling advertising revenue during its later years had forced the community interest company which owned The Superstation to cease trading.

== Former presenters (before closure) ==
- Ryan Woodman
- JC
- Ron Brown
- Gary King
- Andy Lawson
- Dave Sherwood
- Dave Miller
- Will Atkinson
- Sam Turner

== Former programming ==
- Weekday Mornings
- The Golden Hour
- Hit's Not Homework
- Through The Night
- New Music Show
- The Superstation Dance
- Totally 90s
- Europe Rocks
- The Quiet Storm
- Drivetime
- The Superstation Party
- Totally 80s
- The Time Tunnel
- Club Classics
- Chillout Show
- Solid Gold Sunday
