= Smooth Scotland =

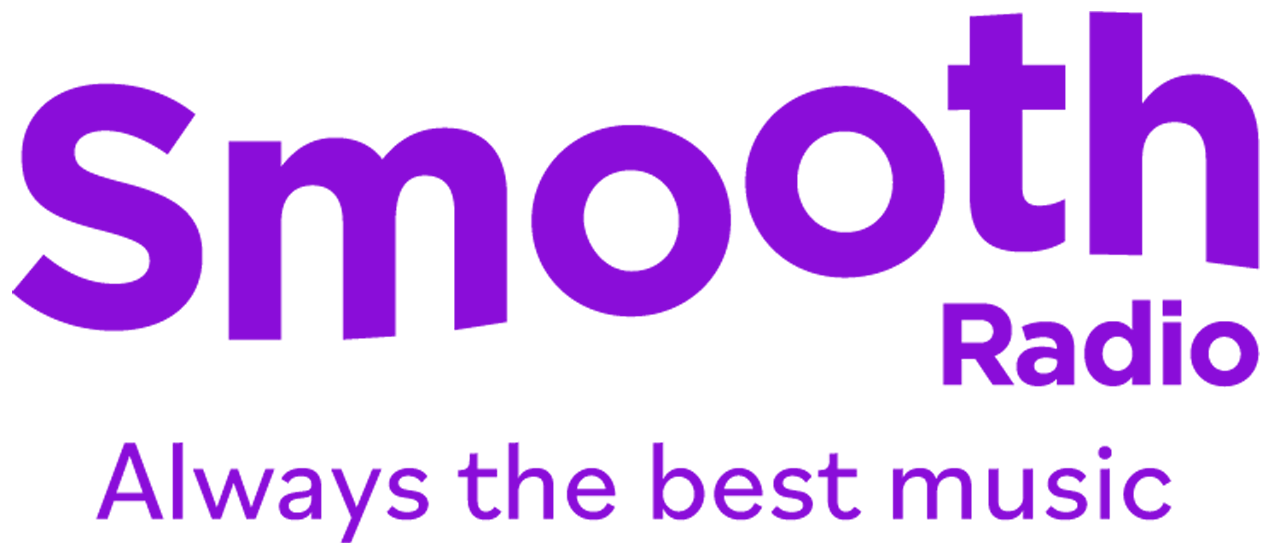
- Glasgow and Edinburgh; Scotland
- Broadcast area: East and West Scotland
- Frequencies: DAB: 11C Glasgow; DAB: 12D Edinburgh (FM: 105.2) MHz Black Hill
- Branding: Always The Best Music for Scotland

Programming
- Format: MOR/oldies
- Network: Smooth Radio

Ownership
- Owner: Global
- Sister stations: Capital Scotland; Heart Scotland

Links
- Website: Smooth Scotland

Smooth Scotland is a Scottish Independent Local Radio station owned and operated by Global as part of the Smooth network. The station replaced Saga 105.2 FM in 2007.

As well as being carried on FM in the Glasgow area, the station is also broadcast on DAB radio to the East of Scotland and online via a streaming service. It is also carried on FM in Wester Ross during non-local broadcast hours of Two Lochs Radio for which it forms a sustaining service.

== Overview ==
=== GMG Radio ownership ===
The station came into being following GMG Radio's purchase of the Saga Radio Group in December 2006, and the granting of permission from the regulator Ofcom to change the format of its Smooth FM stations in London and the North West of England. The decision was made to change both the Smooth FM and Saga stations to Smooth Radio and Saga 105.2 FM was closed at 6pm on Friday 23 March 2007. This was then followed by a preview weekend for the new Smooth Radio giving listeners the opportunity to hear the presenters and music which would be featured on the new station.

The station operated a 24-hour schedule of local programming until August 2008 when networked output from London and Manchester was introduced, leading to the firingsof six station presenters.

Following the publication of John Myers' recommendations of a regulatory overhaul in commercial radio, and the passing of the Digital Economy Act 2010, which allowed stations to co-locate or drop all local shows and broadcast on national DAB, Smooth Radio merged its five England-based stations into one quasi-national station, with local news feeds produced from GMG Radio's headquarters in Salford Quays. GMG made the announcement on 29 June 2010, that it wanted to rival BBC Radio 2 by broadcasting on the Digital 1 multiplex on DAB Digital Radio to the whole of England and Wales, as well as Sky, Freesat, Freeview, Virgin Media and online. A regional flavour would be kept with split news, travel and weather bulletins broadcasting in the FM and DAB regional stations in the North East, North West, West Midlands and East Midlands. London listeners and those tuning nationally would hear national information.

=== Global ownership ===
Most of Smooth Radio's output was relocated to new owner Global's Leicester Square headquarters from 1 October 2013, a move that coincided with a major overhaul of its schedule, and the closure of Smooth 70s after 21 months on air.

In November 2016, Smooth Scotland and its sister station Heart Scotland moved from its former studios at Ballieston in the east end of Glasgow to Global's new Scottish headquarters at West Regent Street in the city centre.

In September 2019, following OFCOM's decision to relax local content obligations from commercial radio, Smooth's local Drivetime and weekend shows were replaced by network programming from London. Local news bulletins, traffic updates and advertising were retained, alongside the station's Scottish breakfast show.

== Programming ==
Local programming is produced and broadcast from Global's Glasgow studios from 6-10am on weekdays presented by John Mellis. All networked programming originates from Global's London headquarters or studios in Birmingham and Manchester.

=== News ===
Global's Newsroom broadcasts hourly regional news bulletins. The Glasgow newsroom also produces bulletins for Capital and Heart in Scotland. National news updates air hourly from Global's London headquarters at times.
