= Greatest Hits Radio Dumfries & Galloway =

Coordinates: 55.0672°N 3.6102°W

- Dumfries; United Kingdom
- Broadcast area: Dumfries and Galloway
- Frequencies: FM: 96.5 MHz; 97.0 MHz; 103.0 MHz
- RDS: GRT HITS
- Branding: The Good Times Sound Like This

Programming
- Format: Classic Hits
- Network: Greatest Hits Radio

Ownership
- Owner: Bauer Media Audio UK
- Sister stations: West FM; Greatest Hits Radio Ayrshire

History
- First air date: 21 May 1990
- Former names: West Sound, South West Sound FM

Links
- Website: GHR Dumfries & Galloway

Greatest Hits Radio Dumfries & Galloway is an Independent Local Radio station based in Glasgow, Scotland, owned and operated by Bauer as part of the Greatest Hits Radio Network. It broadcasts to Dumfries and Galloway.

As of September 2023, the station broadcasts to a weekly audience of 75,000, according to RAJAR.

== Overview ==
The station in Dumfries and Galloway is one of three FM stations forming part of the Greatest Hits Radio network and carries networked programming, with local news and travel.

In September 2019, all local programming from Dumfries ended and local breakfast and drive is coming from Glasgow.

Former West Sound logo used from 2015-2023

The station was rebranded from West Sound to Greatest Hits Radio Dumfries and Galloway on 3 April 2023.

== History ==
Westsound began broadcasting in May 1990, from studios at Campbell House in the grounds of the Crichton Estate, under the name South West Sound FM.

The station later moved to studios in Dumfries' shopping centre, The Loreburne Centre, where it remained until its local shows were axed in 2019.

On 3rd April 2023, Westsound rebranded to form Scotland’s first national commercial radio station, Greatest Hits Radio, along with its sister stations from the Scottish Greatest Hits Radio Network and Radio Borders. Seven hours of Scottish programming were retained, Ewen & Cat At Breakfast and Webster in the afternoons.

== Programming and presenters ==
Much of the station's programming is produced in Greatest Hits Radio's studios in Dundee, Glasgow and Edinburgh.

Some output is produced from GHR's Birmingham, London and Manchester studios and broadcast on both networks in Scotland and England.

Presenters currently on Greatest Hits Radio Dumfries & Galloway are; Simon Ross (Greatest Hits at Breakfast with Rossie), weekdays 6-10am), Ken Bruce (weekdays 10am-1pm), Zoe Ball (weekdays 1pm-4pm), Simon Mayo (Drivetime weekdays 4pm-7pm and Album Show Sunday 1pm-4pm), Jackie Brambles (Monday-Thursday 7pm-10pm), Jenny Powell (Friday 7pm-10pm), Andy Crane (Sunday-Thursday 10pm-1am), Des Paul (Rhythm Of The Night Friday and Saturday 10pm-1am).

=== News ===
The station broadcasts local news bulletins hourly from 6am to 7pm on weekdays and from 7am to 1pm at weekends. Headlines are broadcast on the half-hour during weekday breakfast and drivetime shows, alongside sport and traffic bulletins.

National bulletins from Sky News Radio are carried overnight with bespoke networked Scottish bulletins on weekend afternoons, produced from Radio Clyde's newsroom in Clydebank.
