= West Sound (Ayrshire) =

This is a historical record for the now defunct West Sound radio station that broadcast between 1981 and 2023.

For the current station serving the Ayrshire TSA please visit Greatest Hits Radio Ayrshire.

West Sound began on 16 October 1981 as an independent local radio station for Ayrshire, established by Ayr Radio Limited. It entered a broadcasting environment in which commercial local radio was still relatively new, with only BBC Radio Scotland offering a non-national alternative, so its local identity was central to its appeal.

== The original FM and AM services ==
At launch, West Sound was one station broadcasting on two frequencies:

| Service | Launch frequency | Later frequency |
|---|---|---|
| FM | 96.2 MHz | 96.7 MHz |
| AM / medium wave | 1035 kHz | 1035 kHz |

The FM transmitter was associated with the Darvel transmitter site, while the AM service broadcast from a transmitter near Symington.

In its earliest years, West Sound had a relatively restricted broadcasting day, initially running from 7 am until 8 pm. It later extended its hours, including a move towards midnight broadcasting during the late 1980s

One distinctive feature was its specially composed station theme, Mystic Waters, played at the beginning and end of the broadcasting day. This helped give the station a recognisable identity beyond its presenters and jingles.

== The sound of West Sound ==
West Sound was not simply a music service. It built its reputation on being recognisably Ayrshire-based, with extensive local news, sport, travel (provided by AA roadwatch) community information, familiar voices and specialist programmes.

Its early schedule included presenters such as Bryce Curdy, Ray Daniels, Lou Grant, Tom Ferrie, Dave Marshall and Kenny Campbell. Weekend and late evening output also included country music fronted by Tommy Trusedale, Scottish music, local affairs and other specialist programmes such as rock, dance and indie.

The early AM/FM split

Starting in 1989, the station begun a limited AM split between 9am and noon. This allowed the AM audience to continue to hear Lou Grant, while the growing younger audience on FM would have more contemporary programming.
