= Northsound 1 =

Radio station in Aberdeen, Scotland

Coordinates: 57.1249°N 2.0993°W

- Aberdeen; United Kingdom
- Broadcast area: Aberdeenshire
- Frequencies: FM: 96.9 MHz; 97.6 MHz; 103.0 MHz; DAB: 11C
- RDS: N'Sound1
- Branding: Across North East Scotland

Programming
- Format: CHR/pop
- Network: Hits Radio

Ownership
- Owner: Bauer Media Audio UK
- Sister stations: Greatest Hits Radio North East Scotland

History
- First air date: 27 July 1981; 45 years ago (as Northsound Radio); 9 January 1995; 31 years ago (as Northsound 1)
- Former frequencies: 1035 MW

Links
- Webcast: Rayo
- Website: Northsound 1

Northsound 1 is an Independent Local Radio station formerly based in Aberdeen, Scotland, owned and operated by Bauer Media Audio UK as part of the Hits Radio network. It broadcasts to Aberdeenshire and North East Scotland, although the station no longer has any studios or offices in Aberdeen.

As of September 2024, the station has a weekly audience of 117,000 listeners according to RAJAR.

== History ==
=== Background ===
Northsound 1 logo used from 2003 to 2015.

Until Northsound Radio's establishment, the only local radio output available to listeners in the North East of Scotland was a regional opt-out from the BBC at Beechgrove, which broadcast specialist music programmes for a couple of hours a week along with some opt-out regional news coverage.

In the late 1970s, a commercial radio franchise for Aberdeen, Peterhead and the surrounding areas was advertised by the then-regulator, the Independent Broadcasting Authority. Several organisations applied for the licence, with most additionally seeking a licence covering Inverness and the Moray Firth region – these included Aberdeen Inverness Radio (AIR), North of Scotland Radio, Radio Caledonia and Radio North-East. The only organisations to apply for operations in only one of the broadcast areas were Moray Firth Community Radio (MFCR) and Aberdeen Radio for the Community (ARC).

North of Scotland Radio ultimately won the franchise for Aberdeen on 27 December 1979. It was unsuccessful in its submission for the Moray Firth which was granted to MFCR.

=== Establishment ===
After a change of name, Northsound Radio commenced broadcasting at 6 am on 27 July 1981 from King's Gate. The station was initially broadcast from 6 am to 8 pm each day on 1035 kHz (290 metres) and 96.9 FM (VHF).

=== Later years ===
In October 1988, the station was purchased by Radio Clyde for £1.383 million. The parent company was renamed Scottish Radio Holdings (SRH) in 1994.

For a two-year period from 1994, the station was the main sponsor of Aberdeen Football Club, with the logo appearing on the players' shirts.

On 9 January 1995, Northsound Radio was renamed Northsound 1 and Northsound 2 was established as a classic hits station using the station's AM frequency. Both stations have since started broadcasting on DAB radio and online.

In 2005, SRH was bought by Emap, which then sold its radio stations to Bauer Media Group in 2007.

In March 2025 it was announced that Northsound's studio building was to close and be put up for sale.

== Free concerts ==
From 1997 until 2007, Northsound held free music concerts in Aberdeen almost bi-annually. Northsound delivered its first major outdoor event when the Tall Ships Races arrived in Aberdeen, which called Free at the Quay. Following its success, Free 2000 was staged at the Queen’s Links at Aberdeen Beach followed by Free at the Dee at Duthie Park.

Due to the numbers attending, Northsound decided to move the event to Hazlehead Park and the event was renamed to simply Free 2007. More than 30,000 people attended Free 2007 which saw Beverley Knight, McFly, Shayne Ward, Booty Luv, MacDonald Brothers, Ali Love, Unklejam and others perform free.

Northsound has also been sponsors and organisers of Aberdeen's free Hogmanay street party when they were staged in the city, where performers such as Sandi Thom, Travis and Amy Macdonald have played to large crowds.

== Programming ==
The entirety of the Northsound 1's programming no longer originates from Aberdeen, but is networked content fed across Scotland, and produced and broadcast from Clyde 1 in Clydebank, Forth 1 in Edinburgh and Hits Radio in London & Manchester.

The last remaining local, Aberdeen-based programming strand which consisted of just weekday breakfast was axed in December 2024, and now this show is broadcast from Edinburgh and shared with Bauer radio marketplaces in Edinburgh, Tayside and Inverness.

=== News and sport ===
Northsound 1 broadcasts local news bulletins hourly from 6am to 7pm on weekdays and from 7am to 1pm at weekends. Headlines are broadcast on the half hour during weekday breakfast and drivetime shows, alongside sport, traffic and business bulletins.

National bulletins from Sky News Radio are carried overnight with networked Scottish bulletins at weekends, produced from Radio Clyde's newsroom in Clydebank.

Extended sports coverage airs under the Superscoreboard banner on Saturday afternoons.

== Notable DJs ==
- Nicky Campbell - now a BBC journalist and television presenter.
- Alan Fisher - worked at the station as a reporter/newsreader and is now a senior correspondent with the global news channel, Al Jazeera English based in the United States.
- Robin Galloway - later became a continuity announcer and newsreader for Grampian Television. He would later present the breakfast show on Pure Radio in Glasgow & Tayside.

== See also ==
- Greatest Hits Radio North East Scotland
