= Tay FM =

Coordinates: 56°28′24″N 2°58′16″W

- Dundee and Perth; United Kingdom
- Broadcast area: Tayside and Fife
- Frequencies: FM: 102.8 MHz (Dundee); 96.4 MHz (Perth); DAB: 11B
- RDS: TAYFM
- Branding: Across Tayside and Fife

Programming
- Format: CHR/pop
- Network: Hits Radio

Ownership
- Owner: Bauer Media Audio UK
- Sister stations: Greatest Hits Radio Tayside & Fife

History
- First air date: 9 January 1995 (31 years ago)

Links
- Webcast: Rayo
- Website: Tay FM

Tay FM is an Independent Local Radio station serving Dundee, Perth and Tayside in Scotland. The station is owned by and operated by Bauer Media Audio UK and forms part of the Hits Radio network.

As of September 2024, the station has a weekly audience of 116,000 listeners according to RAJAR.

== History ==
=== Early years as Radio Tay ===
Tay FM logo used from 2010 to 2015.

Radio Tay commenced broadcasting on 17 October 1980 in Dundee and 14 November 1980 in Perth from studios at 6 North Isla Street in Dundee, near the city's Tannadice & Dens Park football stadia. The station originally broadcast each day from 6am to 8pm.

=== Split into Tay FM and Tay AM ===
On 9 January 1995, Radio Tay split transmissions on its FM and AM/MW frequencies (which had until then been a simulcast) into two separate stations and relaunched as Tay FM and Tay AM (later renamed Tay 2 and today known as Greatest Hits Radio Tayside & Fife).

Both stations now also broadcast on DAB (Digital Audio Broadcasting – i.e. Digital Radio) and via their respective websites.

Tay FM broadcasts on a main transmitter in Angus on 102.8 MHz, with relays on 96.4 MHz in Perth and on the same frequency at the Tay Bridge. It is the more contemporary of the two stations.

== Programming ==
Networked programming is produced and broadcast from Clyde 1 in Glasgow, Forth 1 in Edinburgh and Hits Radio in London & Manchester.

The remaining local programming which consisted of just weekday breakfast was axed in December 2024.

=== News ===
Tay FM broadcasts local news bulletins hourly from 6am to 7pm on weekdays and from 7am to 1pm at weekends. Headlines are broadcast on the half-hour during weekday breakfast and drivetime shows, alongside sport and traffic bulletins.

National bulletins from Sky News Radio are carried overnight with bespoke networked Scottish bulletins at weekends, produced from Radio Clyde's newsroom in Clydebank.

== See also ==
- Tay 2
- Radio Tay
