= Heart Scotland =

Regional radio station in Scotland

Coordinates: 55.8602°N 4.1156°W

- Glasgow; United Kingdom
- Broadcast area: Central and Southern Scotland
- Frequencies: DAB: 11C Glasgow; DAB: 12D Edinburgh; FM: 100.0 MHz Millburn Muir; FM: 100.3 MHz Black Hill; FM: 101.1 MHz Craigkelly; FM: 101.1 MHz Rosneath; FM: 103.3 MHz Penicuik
- Branding: Scotland's Heart

Programming
- Format: Hot AC
- Network: Heart

Ownership
- Owner: Global
- Sister stations: Capital Scotland; Smooth Scotland

History
- First air date: 6 May 2014

Heart Scotland is a regional radio station owned and operated by Global as part of the Heart network. The station relaunched as Heart on 6 May 2014, serving central and southern Scotland from studios in Glasgow city centre.

Heart Scotland originally broadcast as Scot FM until 2001, when Guardian Media Group bought the station, leading to a relaunch as Real Radio Scotland. Global Radio acquired GMG Radio on 25 June 2012, but operated Real Radio in a "hold separate" situation known as Real and Smooth Ltd, which ended on 1 April 2014.

== History ==
=== Scot FM ===
In September 1994, Scot FM began broadcasting a regional 24-hour service to Central Scotland from studios in the Leith district of Edinburgh. Originally billed pre-launch as a relatively highbrow and primarily speech-based station, the station went through numerous format changes, financial difficulties and mixed ratings fortunes. In June 2001, the Guardian Media Group acquired Scot FM from previous owners, the Wireless Group for £25.5 million.

=== Real Radio ===
Original Real Radio logo

Shortly afterwards, a major overhaul of the station was announced including an on-air rebrand, a move to new studios at Ballieston near Glasgow, a revamped programming line-up and a strengthened round-the-clock news service. Real Radio Scotland began broadcasting at 8am on Tuesday 8 January 2002 with breakfast presenter Robin Galloway introducing the first song to be played, "A Star Is Born".

Within a year of its launch, the station reached a record weekly audience of 614,000 listeners, and by 2004, further increased its audience to 688,000, placing Real Radio as the most listened to station in Scotland. By 2007, the station's audience share reached a record 31% but fell by around 10% a year later.

Under the Real Radio brand, the station held various charity events and campaigns since its launch, including a reality challenge called The Real Sleeopver, and the annual Bring £1 to Work Day, both in aid of the Children's Hospice Association Scotland.

In 2006, Real Radio Scotland attempted to increase its coverage area by applying for the new FM licence for Aberdeen & Aberdeenshire, but lost out to Original 106. During the summer of 2008, the station introduced networked programming including evening & overnight output from Manchester and a Saturday morning show hosted by Chris Tarrant. Listeners' complaints led to the return of local night time output a few months later. The networked output was reintroduced during the summer of 2011.

From August 2006 to June 2009, the Irish-based sports broadcaster Setanta Sports simulcast Real Radio's weeknight football phone-in live twice a week on Setanta Sports 1. The station also carried live commentaries for some of the Scottish national team's matches and eight SPL games during the season, alongside broadcast a Scottish football phone-in on weekday evenings and Saturday afternoons, until sports coverage outside news bulletins was dropped at the end of the 2011-12 season.

Robin Galloway left Real Radio in November 2010, shortly after an incident in which his producer ran in the nude past Labour Party leader Ed Miliband while he was being interviewed - despite Miliband defending them. After RAJAR reported a decline in listenership figirues, Galloway commented the halcyon days for the brand are very much in the past now.

By March 2014, the station's audience share had dropped further to 7.7%, down sharply from an 11.3% share recorded in December 2010. Around the time of the rebrand to Heart, the share had slipped to 6% with an audience of 421,000 listeners - at the time, the station's all-time lowest RAJAR figures. The station later managed to recover slightly, increasing its share back to 7.4%.

=== Global Radio ===
On 25 June 2012, it was announced Global Radio (the owner of stations such as Capital, Smooth Radio and Heart) had bought GMG Radio. The former GMG stations, including Real Radio, were placed under a hold separate company known as Real and Smooth Limited.

As of 5 November 2012, Real Radio's local programming has consisted of daily breakfast and weekday drivetime shows from Glasgow, with most non-peak output broadcast from Salford Quays.

On 6 February 2014, Global Radio announced it would be rebranding all Real Radio stations as Heart. Real Radio Scotland began a gradual transition to the Heart branding on 24 March 2014 and phased out the Real Radio branding on Sunday 20 April 2014. The full relaunch as Heart Scotland took place on Tuesday 6 May 2014 in line with most other Heart rebranded stations.

Although the station managed to increase its audience towards the end of 2014, its share had dropped even further to 5.9% by the following March before dropping to the station's all-time lowest RAJAR figures (at the time) of 4.8%. By September 2016, its audience share had recovered to 6.7%, but fell back to 4.8% a year later. In December 2018 the audience share reached an all time low with 4.5%

In November 2016, Heart Scotland and its sister station Smooth Scotland moved from its former studios at Ballieston in the east end of Glasgow to Global's new Scottish headquarters at 1 West Regent Street in the city centre.

In February 2019, following OFCOM's decision to relax local content obligations from commercial radio, Global announced it would replace Heart Scotland's local breakfast and weekend shows with networked programming from London.

As of 3 June 2019, the station's local output consists of a three-hour drivetime show on weekdays, alongside local news bulletins, traffic updates and advertising. Four of the station's local personalities left, including presenters Robin Galloway, Adele Cunningham, Lynne Hoggan and Paul Harper.

On 11 April 2023, it was announced that Heart Scotland would reintroduce local breakfast, daytime and weekend shows as part of an expansion of Global's Scottish radio operations. This will see current drive time presenters Des Clarke and Jennifer Reoch move to Breakfast. Sister station Capital Scotland (owned and operated under a brand licence by Communicorp) has also reintroduced local programming.

=== Analogue (FM) ===
| Transmitter Site | Frequency | Power | RDS Name | PI Code | Area | County |
|---|---|---|---|---|---|---|
| Millburn Muir | 100 MHz | 0.1W | Heart | C3A9 | Alexandria, Dunbartonshire, and Balloch | West Dunbartonshire |
| Black Hill | 100.3 MHz | 20 | Heart | C3A9 | Glasgow, Lanarkshire | West Central Scotland |
| Craigkelly | 101.1 MHz | 10 kW | Heart | C3A9 | Edinburgh, Queensferry, and St Andrews | Edinburgh |
| Rosneath | 101.1 MHz | 0.2W | Heart | C3A9 | Rosneath | West Central Scotland |
| Penicuik | 103.3 MHz | 0.45W | Heart | C3A9 | Penicuik | Midlothian |

== Programming ==
All networked programming originates from Global's London headquarters.

Regional programming is produced and broadcast from Global's Glasgow studios from 6:30am-7pm on weekdays and 12-4pm on weekends.

=== News ===
Heart Scotland broadcasts hourly regional news bulletins, produced by Global's Scotland newsroom in Glasgow, from 6am-7pm on weekdays and 6am-12pm at weekends. It also broadcasts headlines on the half hour during weekday breakfast and drive time shows.

National news updates air hourly from Global's London headquarters at all other times. The Glasgow newsroom also produces bulletins for Capital Scotland and Smooth Scotland.

== Notable former presenters ==
- Nick Abbot (now at LBC)
- Colin McAllister and Justin Ryan
- Robin Galloway (now works for DC Thomson as Group Head Of Radio Presentation)
- Ewen Cameron (now at STV Radio)
- Alan Rough (now at Central FM)
- Derek Johnstone (The Real Radio Football Phone In)>
- Cat Cubie
- Ryan Seacrest (continues at On Air with Ryan Seacrest)
