= Clyde 1 (Ayrshire) =

Coordinates: 55.243717°N 4.855249°W

Clyde 1 Ayrshire
- Ayr; United Kingdom
- Broadcast area: Ayrshire and South West Scotland
- Frequencies: FM: 96.7 MHz; 97.5 MHz; 106.7 MHz; DAB: 11B
- RDS: ClydeAyr
- Branding: Across Ayrshire; Ayrshire's Clyde 1

Programming
- Format: CHR/Pop
- Network: Hits Radio

Ownership
- Owner: Bauer Media Audio UK
- Sister stations: Clyde 1 Greatest Hits Radio Ayrshire; Greatest Hits Radio Dumfries & Galloway

History
- First air date: 6 January 1997 (as West FM); 16 September 2024 (as Clyde 1 Ayrshire)
- Former names: West FM

Links
- Webcast: Rayo
- Website: https://hellorayo.co.uk/clyde/ayrshire/

Clyde 1 Ayrshire, formerly West FM, is an Independent Local Radio station based in Glasgow, Scotland, owned and operated by Bauer Media Audio UK. It is a part of the Hits Radio network. It broadcasts to Ayrshire and South West Scotland.

== Programming ==
Bowie at Breakfast which is produced and broadcast from Clyde 1 at its studios in Glasgow on weekdays 6-10am, is the only non networked show, but is shared with the main Glasgow TSA Broadcast. At all other times, the station airs networked programming from Forth 1 in Edinburgh and Hits Radio in London and Manchester.

On Monday 10 July 2017, West FM ceased broadcasting from Ayr and moved its studio output to Clyde 1's Clydebank studios. The station retained its local breakfast, albeit presented from Clydebank, with news, sales and charity staff based in Prestwick.

In August 2024, it was announced that after 27 years of the West FM name, the station would be rebranded to 'Clyde 1 Ayrshire' from 16 September 2024 and share all output with Clyde 1 whilst retaining local news, weather and travel bulletins. The station's breakfast show, Ali & Michael in the Morning, was replaced by Clyde 1's Bowie at Breakfast.

=== News and Sport ===
Clyde 1 Ayrshire broadcasts local news bulletins hourly. Headlines are broadcast on the half hour during weekday breakfast and drivetime shows, alongside sport and traffic bulletins.

National bulletins from Sky News Radio are carried overnight with bespoke networked Scottish bulletins at weekends, produced from Radio Clyde's newsroom in Glasgow.
