= Greatest Hits Radio Glasgow & the West =

- Glasgow; United Kingdom
- Broadcast area: Glasgow and West Central Scotland
- Frequency: DAB: 11C
- Branding: The Good Times Sound Like This; Across Glasgow & the West

Programming
- Format: Classic hits
- Network: Greatest Hits Radio

Ownership
- Owner: Bauer Media Audio UK
- Sister stations: Clyde 1

History
- First air date: 3 January 1990; 36 years ago (as Clyde 2); 3 April 2023; 2 years ago (as Greatest Hits Radio Glasgow and the West)
- Former names: Clyde 2
- Former frequencies: 1152 kHz; 103.3 MHz (Oban)

Technical information
- Transmitter coordinates: 55.7943°N 4.1595°W

Links
- Website: GHR Glasgow and the West

Greatest Hits Radio Glasgow & the West (formerly Clyde 2) is an Independent Local Radio station based in Glasgow, Scotland, owned and operated by Bauer as part of the Greatest Hits Radio network. It broadcasts to Glasgow and West Central Scotland.

As of December 2023, the station has a weekly audience of 238,000 listeners according to RAJAR.

== History ==
The station has its origins with Radio Clyde, which began playing different programmes on its AM and FM frequencies on 12 August 1988. The new Clyde FM adopted a top-40 format while the older station continued on AM. Clyde 2 was established on the AM frequency when Radio Clyde fully stopped simulcasting on 3 January 1990, with Clyde 1 using the FM frequencies.

Clyde 2 was rebranded as Greatest Hits Radio Glasgow and the West on 3 April 2023. On 12 November 2023, it was announced that the station would cease broadcasting on medium wave before the end of the year, but would remain available on DAB.

Logo used from 2015 to 2023 up until rebrand, under the name Clyde 2.

== Programming ==
Much of the station's programming is produced in Greatest Hits Radio's studios in Dundee, Glasgow and Edinburgh.

Some output is produced from GHR's Birmingham, London and Manchester studios and broadcast on both networks in Scotland and England.

=== News ===
Greatest Hits Radio Glasgow and the West broadcasts local news bulletins hourly from 6am to 7pm on weekdays and from 7am to 1pm at weekends. Headlines are broadcast on the half hour during weekday breakfast and drivetime shows, alongside sport and traffic bulletins.

The Clydebank newsroom also produces bespoke national Scottish bulletins at weekends with Sky News Radio bulletins carried overnight.

== See also ==
- Radio Clyde
- Clyde 1
