= Radio Clyde =

Former radio station in Glasgow City, Scotland

- Glasgow; Scotland
- Broadcast area: Glasgow and West Central Scotland
- Frequencies: 102.5 MHz; 1152 kHz

Ownership
- Owner: Radio Clyde plc

History
- First air date: 31 December 1973; 52 years ago
- Last air date: 2 January 1990; 36 years ago

Radio Clyde was an Independent Local Radio station serving Glasgow and West Central Scotland. Radio Clyde was owned and operated by Radio Clyde plc, which was later renamed Scottish Radio Holdings, and it was based at studios in Clydebank, West Dunbartonshire.

== History ==
Radio Clyde began broadcasting as the commercial radio station in Scotland at 10.30pm on Monday 31 December 1973. It was the first ILR station outside London, on 261 metres medium wave and 95.1 FM (later moving to 102.5 FM). Its original slogan was Radio Clyde, 261, all together now. The station's studios were originally located at the Anderston Centre complex within Glasgow city centre, but moved to its current site at Clydebank in 1983.

During the 1980s, under Programme Controller Alex Dickson, the station maintained a commitment to the arts, including outside broadcasts by the Scottish National Orchestra and other orchestras in its programming. It also broadcast Interact, a two-hour weekly arts magazine programme, and employed a full-time drama producer who commissioned work performed by prominent Scottish actors such as Eileen McCallum and Bill Paterson.

Radio Clyde's FM frequencies were used for a new top 40 format on 12 August 1988, with the launch of a separate Clyde FM service carrying chart music at weekends. The split became permanent on Wednesday 3 January 1990, with the establishment of Clyde 2 carrying a classic hits format on the older station's AM frequency.

Notable past presenters within the Radio Clyde family of stations include Ross King, who was the station's youngest ever DJ, and is now based in Hollywood, from where he appears regularly on Good Morning Britain and Lorraine. Other names are Paul Coia, Mary Lee, Norman Ross, who now is operating a charity community radio,Ken Sykora, Richard Park, Tiger Tim Stevens, Mark Goodier, Tom Russell (who presented the long running Friday Night Rock Show), Alan Todd and Dougie Donnelly. BBC Breakfast anchor Bill Turnbull began his career in journalism at the station.

== See also ==
- Clyde 1
- Greatest Hits Radio Glasgow & The West
