= Sky News Radio =

- Osterley; United Kingdom
- Frequency: Lyngsat Home Page

Programming
- Language: English
- Format: News

History
- First air date: June 1999

Links
- Website: news.sky.com/info/radio

Sky News Radio is the radio arm of Sky News, owned by Sky UK. It has been operating since June 1999, providing a news bulletin service for UK commercial radio stations operators across the UK and for a number of English-speaking radio stations around the world.

Sky News Radio is also responsible for producing a number of podcasts, including the Sky News Daily, which is regularly hosted by Nial Patterson and Ian King live.

Sky News Radio also produce a news service for smart speakers.

== Bulletin service ==
Sky News Radio launched in June 1999 originally providing bespoke bulletins for Talk Radio UK. The service subsequently expanded in October 2001 to provide hourly news bulletins, audio and scripts for clients including UTV Radio, GMG Radio, Global Radio and DNN.

The radio newsroom operated from Sky News' studios at Osterley, London. Adverts following peak-time news bulletins were sold via UBC Media and reached more than eighty radio stations.

On 15 October 2008, Independent Radio News (IRN) announced it was switching its main supplier of news from ITN to Sky News Radio, expanding its customer client list by more than 280 stations and giving it a near-monopoly in UK commercial radio news provision.

The new IRN service from Sky News Radio began at 14:00 on Tuesday 3 March 2009, with the first bulletin read by Ursula Hansford and simulcast on the Sky News television channel. Bulletin duration was reduced from three minutes to two minutes, and the previous IRN 90 overnight and weekend bulletin service was dropped.

Audio cuts are distributed to stations via FTP from the IRN website. Stations can also source their own audio cuts from Sky News and Sky Sports News television. The solus Newslink advertising spots are managed by Global Radio.

IRN operates two audio channels on the Eutelsat 9B satellite: IRN1 transmits the hourly news bulletins and live sports reports. IRN2 transmits press conferences and live events.

IRN1 is also broadcast on an audio channel on the Astra 2B satellite.

In the event of a major news story (e.g., royal death or major terrorist incident), audio from Sky News television will be relayed on IRN1 and IRN2 with additional one-minute bulletins on the half-hour.

IRN supplies match reports from every Premier League match, with reporters supplied by sports radio agency World Sports Communications. A classified football results check is broadcast every Saturday at 17:10.

Many community, student and hospital radio stations around the UK take the hourly bulletin service. Copy and audio cuts are also used by BFBS Radio, in addition to radio stations in the Republic of Ireland, Spain, Cyprus, UAE, South Africa and Australia.

== Proposed radio station ==
In 2001, BSkyB proposed to become a partner in DAB news station DNN. This deal fell through, although Sky News Radio did become the main national news supplier to DNN. The station closed in July 2006 and was replaced on the MXR multiplexes by London speech station LBC.

In March 2007, BSkyB and Chrysalis Radio announced a new joint partnership to launch a dedicated Sky News Radio station on the proposed bid by Channel 4's 4 Digital Group for the second UK DAB multiplex. Chrysalis's existing London rolling news station, LBC News 1152, was to be re-branded "Sky News Radio for London". A large amount of programming was planned to be shared with the national DAB service. However, following the sale of Chrysalis Radio's stations to Global Radio, chief executive Ashley Tabor announced in October 2007 that the contract was "not commercially attractive" and they would not be continuing with the proposals.

== See also ==
- Sky News
- Sky Sports News Radio, the Sky Sports News equivalent
- DNN (radio)
