= Clyde 1 =

Scottish independent local radio station

Coordinates: 55.9040°N 4.4077°W

- Logo used since 2015.
- Glasgow; United Kingdom
- Broadcast area: Glasgow, West Central Scotland and Ayrshire (Clyde 1 Ayrshire)
- Frequencies: FM: 97.0MHz; 102.3MHz; 102.5MHz; 103.3MHz; DAB: 11C
- RDS: Clyde 1
- Branding: Across Glasgow & The West "The Biggest Hits, The Biggest Throwbacks"

Programming
- Format: CHR/pop
- Network: Hits Radio

Ownership
- Owner: Bauer Media Audio UK
- Sister stations: Clyde 1 (Ayrshire); Greatest Hits Radio Glasgow & The West

History
- First air date: 12 August 1988; 38 years ago
- Former frequencies: FM: 95.1 MHz; AM: 1152 kHz

Links
- Webcast: Rayo
- Website: Clyde 1

Clyde 1 is an Independent Local Radio station based in Glasgow, Scotland, owned and operated by Bauer Media Audio UK as part of the Hits Radio network. It broadcasts to Glasgow and West Central Scotland.

As of September 2024, the station has a weekly audience of 747,000 listeners according to RAJAR.

== History ==
Clyde 1 was born out of the compulsory transmission splitting enforced by the UK regulators from the late 1980s. It used the pre-existing Radio Clyde's FM frequency for a new Top-40 format radio station called Clyde FM, which aired at 4 pm on 12 August 1988. The station fully separated from Radio Clyde on 3 January 1990, when it was renamed Clyde 1, while the older station was replaced with Clyde 2 on the same day.

The development of live-streaming and digital radio led to a widening of the station's potential audience through carriage on the station's website and Bauer Radio's DAB multiplex in Glasgow.

Radio Clyde was controlled by Scottish Radio Holdings (SRH) until 2005, when the company was acquired by Emap. It changed hands again in 2008, when Emap sold their consumer magazines and radio business units to current owner Bauer Media.

The station's Freeview carriage came as a consequence of the closure of its sister station 3C by the station's then-owners, and resulted in UK-wide coverage until it was removed on 30 October 2008.

A third service was launched on Monday 19 January 2015 as Clyde 3, carrying a locally branded version of The Hits on DAB, with opt-outs for local news, traffic and advertising. From 1 September 2017, the local City 3 branding of the stations on DAB was withdrawn, in favour of reverting to using The Hits name.

A fourth station, Clyde Rocks, was launched as a 30-day trial on Wednesday 20 April 2016, with the intention of the outcome of the trial being used to form a bid for the 96.3 FM radio licence, which had recently been vacated by its former operator, XFM Scotland. Ultimately, however, Bauer Radio were unsuccessful in their bid, and the licence was awarded by Ofcom to another bidder, Rock Radio.

It was announced on 12 January 2026 that, after 43 years in Clydebank, Clyde 1 would be returning to Glasgow city centre. The station broadcast from its Clydebank base for the final time just before 7am on 28 August 2026 during Bowie at Breakfast with the show coming live from a Glasgow City Sightseeing bus transporting the team to the new studios at 100 Queen Street. The first song played from the new studios was Bits and Pieces. The final show that was broadcast from the Clydebank studios was the edition of Superscoreboard that aired on 10 November 2026 with its first show in Glasgow broadcast the next day.

== Events ==
Clyde 1 used to hold an event called Clyde 1 Live at the SECC in Glasgow. The event included some of the many artists which are broadcast on the station, past events have featured Calvin Harris, Labrinth, Jessie J, Olly Murs, The Sugababes, Amelia Lily, Pixie Lott, McFly, Lawson, Cover Drive, Matt Cardle, Gary Barlow, John Newman, The Vamps and also Dappy.

On 5 February 2024, it was announced that Clyde 1 Live would return to celebrate the station's 50th anniversary. This event took place on 31 May 2024 at the OVO Hydro, with 12,500 people in attendance. Clyde 1 presenter George Bowie performed one of his GBX sets, with fellow presenters Cassi Gillespie and Callum Gallacher performing DJ sets as well. Acts included Texas, Tom Walker, Amy Macdonald, Emeli Sandé, Callum Beattie and Nathan Evans.

== Programming ==
The majority of programming - local and networked - is produced and broadcast from Radio Clyde's studios in Glasgow, however some networked output originates from Forth 1 in Edinburgh and sister station Hits Radio in Manchester. The station also opts out of some networked output to broadcast additional local programming, including sports coverage and specialist music shows.

The station's local presenters include George Bowie (Bowie at Breakfast/The GB Xperience), Garry Spence, Grant Thomson, Steven Mill and Cassi Gillespie (Bowie at Breakfast).

=== News and sport ===
Clyde 1 broadcasts local news bulletins hourly from 6a.m. to 7p.m. on weekdays and from 7a.m. to 1p.m. at weekends. Headlines are broadcast on the half hour during weekday breakfast and drivetime shows, alongside sport and traffic bulletins.

The Clydebank newsroom also produces bespoke national Scottish bulletins at weekends, with Sky News Radio bulletins carried overnight. Radio Clyde's head of news and sport is Lorraine Herbison, who is also Bauer's head of news for its Scottish stations.

Sports coverage airs under the Superscoreboard banner and includes live match reports during the season and a magazine show on weekday evenings. It is presented by Gordon Duncan and features regular panellists Hugh Keevins and Gordon Dalziel.

== See also ==
- Radio Clyde
- Greatest Hits Radio Glasgow & the West
