= Media in Glasgow =

This article deals with the Media in Glasgow. The city of Glasgow, Scotland is home to large sections of the Scottish national media. It hosts the following:

== Television ==
- BBC Scotland — the national broadcaster, based in Pacific Quay Studios at Pacific Quay.
- BBC Alba — a Scottish Gaelic language channel jointly owned by the BBC and MG Alba. It has its headquarters at Pacific Quay.
- STV — (previously known as Scottish Television in Central Scotland, and Grampian Television in Northern Scotland). Scotland's largest independent ITV company, owned by the STV Group plc, is based in Pacific Quay.

Television programmes set in Glasgow include: Taggart, Rebus (set in Edinburgh but shot mostly in Glasgow), High Times, Rab C Nesbitt, City Lights, Chewing the Fat, River City, Still Game and Lovesick.

== Radio ==
- AWAZ FM
- BBC Radio Scotland
- Capital Scotland
- Celtic Music Radio
- Clyde 1
- Eklipse Sports Radio
- Greatest Hits Radio Glasgow & The West
- Insight Radio
- Nation Radio Scotland
- Radio Free Scotland
- Smooth Scotland
- STV Radio
- Sunny Govan Radio

== Magazines ==
- bunkered — Scotland's best-selling golf magazine and the biggest-selling golf magazine in the UK per capita.

== Newspapers ==
A number of major Scottish newspapers are published in the city:

- The Daily Record and Sunday Mail — Scotland's best-selling tabloid, based at Central Quay
- The Herald — Scotland's best-selling broadsheet
- The Sunday Herald — its five-year-old sister title
- The Evening Times — an evening tabloid distributed in the west of Scotland

As well as Scottish editions of:

- The Sun
- The Daily Mail and The Mail on Sunday
- The Times and Sunday Times

Local newspapers are:

- The Glaswegian — Covering Glasgow and parts of East Renfrewshire
- The Digger — Mainly covering the North of Glasgow
- Local News for Southsiders — The Southside of Glasgow and the Govan area.
- The Glasgow East News — The East End of the City
- The West End Mail — Partick, West-End and the Northwest outskirts. -Ceased December 2006
- The Springburn Herald — Weekly newspaper covering the area of North Glasgow and East Dunbartonshire
- G41 — Monthly community newspaper serving Dumbreck, Pollokshields, Strathbungo, Shawlands and Langside. Published by a social enterprise called Southside Media.
- Glasgow Keelie A mutual-aid based monthly newspaper covering events in the Glasgow area

== Internet ==
- Scot24news
- Southside Happenings A local website documenting life on the southside of the city.
- g41.org.uk Citizen journalism website created by Southside Media
- Transform Television Transform TV is Scotland's Community TV Channel on the web by Fablevision
- Glasgowist A website celebrating the best people and places in Glasgow.
- Glasgow Filmmakers Alliance Online database of Individuals and Companies working in Film and Television in Glasgow.

== See also ==
- Media in Scotland
- Scottish Daily News
- List of Scotland–based production companies

== Resources ==
Gurevitch M. Culture, Society and the Media. Routledge: New Ed edition, 1982
