= Queen's Park Secondary School =

School in Glasgow, Scotland

- City and royal burgh of Glasgow (ca. 1175–1893); County of the city of Glasgow (1893–1975); District of City of Glasgow (1975-1996); Scotland

Information
- Established: 1873
- Closed: 1994
- Gender: Co-educational

Queen's Park Secondary School was a secondary school in Glasgow, Scotland.

== History ==
Queen's Park School was built in 1873 for the Cathcart Parish School Board and opened officially in 1876, with the original building located on Grange Road in the Battlefield neighbourhood of the city, opposite the public park after which it was named as well as the Glasgow Victoria Infirmary hospital. Extensions were added in 1902 and 1912 (the latter intended as the first section to entirely replace the older buildings, but the project went uncompleted due to World War I). In its early decades Queen's Park School also educated young children of primary school age, before later being defined as a Senior Secondary school only, its Junior equivalent being the buildings a few blocks away on Carmichael Place, which have survived into the 21st century as Battlefield Primary School.

Queen's Park Secondary School
- Location of the school's two sites

In 1967, a new campus was constructed over a mile away to the east in the Toryglen area to serve as the local comprehensive school for the South East of the city.

In 1989, Strathclyde Regional Council announced a plan for pupils from Stonelaw High School in the nearby town of Rutherglen – which at that time was within the boundaries of Glasgow – to leave their existing buildings (split over two separate sites) and move into the Queen's Park Secondary buildings at Toryglen, while the Queen's Park pupils would be relocated to Adelphi Secondary School in the Gorbals district. However, this plan never became reality, and within a few years a replacement for Stonelaw was under construction in Rutherglen, the Adelphi buildings had been converted to other commercial uses and Queen's Park was marked to be closed; it had already suffered from falling enrollment for some years due to its location on the periphery of its catchment area and persistent rumours concerning the likely closure, and eventually this occurred in 1994. Most feeder primary schools were realigned to Shawlands Academy. After several years as a derelict plot, a housing development was built on the site, while its adjacent playing fields still have a recreational function as part of the Toryglen Regional Football Centre.

The Grange Road buildings were used as a filming location for The Prime of Miss Jean Brodie in 1968, and the premises became a Teachers' Resource Centre before being damaged in an arson attack in the 1990s and being demolished in 2006. The site is now occupied by the New Victoria Hospital (or more precisely one of its car parks), the only surviving feature being the exterior fence and its stone gate posts.

== Sport ==
The school's rugby union team, Queens Park F.P., existed from 1906 to 1974 when they merged with Cartha RFC to form Cartha Queens Park RFC which still plays today.

In football, the school still holds the national record for the number of Boys Under 16 Shield victories with six (their closest challengers being local rivals Holyrood Secondary School), although these wins were all achieved prior to World War II.

== Notable pupils ==
- John Anderson, sports coach/referee (Gladiators)
- Chaim Bermant, writer and journalist
- Winnie Ewing, politician
- Monty Finniston, industrialist
- Alastair Fowler, academic and literary critic
- Tom Honeyman, museum curator Kelvingrove Art Gallery and Museum
- Stan Laurel (1890–1965), comic actor, writer, and film director
- John Maclean (1879–1923), political activist (Red Clydeside)
- Ally MacLeod, football player and manager
- Ian McCaskill (1938–2016), meteorologist
- Robert Smyth McColl, international footballer and businessman (RS McColl)
- Dame Anna Neagle, actress and singer
- Junior Omand (1931–2005), footballer
- John Ormiston (1880–1917), footballer
- Charles Risk (1884–1949), footballer
- Ralph Risk, footballer and solicitor
- Manny Shinwell, politician
- C. P. Taylor, playwright
- William Templeton (1913–1973), playwright
- George Wallace, businessman and life peer
- Isaac Wolfson, businessman
- Helen Fraser, feminist, educationalist and politician
