= Southside Media =

Southside Media was a not-for-profit hyperlocal media publisher. It was a social enterprise based in the southside of Glasgow, Scotland.

Its first community newspaper - G41 - was launched in December 2005 by journalist David Eyre. It was a monthly paper serving the communities of Pollokshields, Shawlands, Strathbungo, Crossmyloof, Langside and Dumbreck. A second newspaper - G42 - was launched in September 2007. It served the communities of Govanhill, Crosshill, Toryglen, Battlefield and Mount Florida.

G41 was one of Scotland's first hyperlocal newspapers. Southside Media was one of Scotland's first Community Interest Companies and was officially registered under the name Glasgow Southside Media CIC.

The papers were produced using open source software, including GIMP and Scribus.

Alongside its newspapers, Southside Media ran two online community news networks, g41.org.uk and g42.org.uk. These were built using the Drupal open source content management system.

In July 2008 Southside Media had to cease trading after a fall in advertising revenue.

Southside Media won several awards, including a Level 2 award from Scotland UnLtd. In June 2008, Southside Media journalist Joe Eyre was a runner up in the Local Category of the Oxfam Refugee Week Scottish Media Awards. In August 2008 a motion S3M-2405 regretting the closure of G41 and G42 was put down in the Scottish Parliament, attracting cross-party support.
