= Risk (disambiguation) =

Risk is the possibility of loss or injury.

Risk, Risks, or The Risk may also refer to:

== Arts, entertainment, and media ==
=== Films ===
- Risk (2001 film), an Australian film
- Risk (2007 film), a Bollywood film directed by Vishram Sawant
- Risk (2016 film), an American documentary

=== Games ===
- Risk (game), a strategy board game of world conquest
  - Risk (1988 video game), a 1988 game based on the board game
  - Risk (1996 video game), the Windows version

=== Literature ===
- "Risk" (short story), a 1955 science fiction short story by Isaac Asimov
- Risk, a book by John Adams

=== Music ===
- Risk (band), German thrash metal band

==== Albums ====
- Risk (Megadeth album), a 1999 album by the metal band Megadeth
- Risk (Terminaator album), a 2001 album by rock band Terminaator
- Risk (Ten Shekel Shirt album), 2003
- Risk (Paul Brandt album), a 2007 album by country music singer Paul Brandt

==== Songs ====
- "Risk" (song), by Gracie Abrams from the 2024 album The Secret of Us
- "Risk", a song by Deftones from the 2010 album Diamond Eyes
- "Risk", a song by Die Krupps from 1985 album Entering the Arena
- "Risk", a song by Metric from the 2018 album Art of Doubt

=== Periodicals ===
- Risk (magazine), a financial magazine covering risk management
- RISKS Digest, an online computer periodical

=== Other uses in arts, entertainment, and media ===
- Risk (character), a DC comics character and member of the Teen Titans
- "Risk", a television episode of Person of Interest season 1.
- RISK!, a storytelling podcast created and hosted by Kevin Allison
- The Risk, a musical group in The X Factor (British TV series) series 8

== Math and science ==
- Statistical risk

== People ==
- Charles Risk (1897–1943), American politician
- Charles Risk (footballer), Scottish footballer
- Ralph Risk (1891–1961), Scottish lawyer and footballer
- RISK (graffiti artist), Los Angeles-based graffiti artist and fashion entrepreneur

== Other uses ==
- The Risk, New South Wales, a rural locality in New South Wales
- Risk, County Londonderry, a townland in Northern Ireland
- RiSK, a television production company co-founded by Karl Pilkington
- Risk, the collective noun for lobsters

== See also ==
- Risky (disambiguation)
- RISC (disambiguation)
