= Crosshill Queen's Park Church =

Church building in Glasgow, Scotland

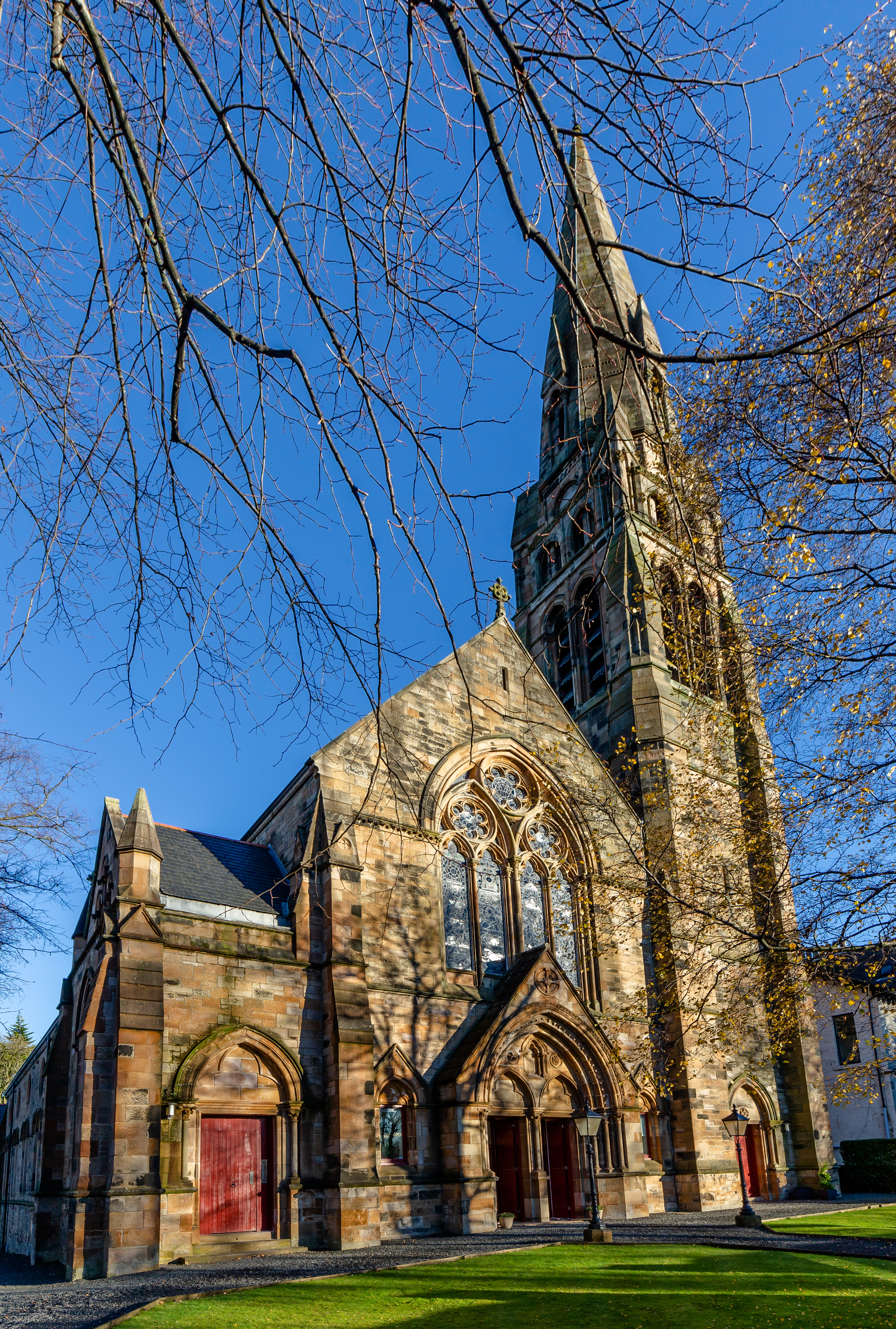
- The building in 2018
- Interactive map of the Crosshill Queen's Park Church area

General information
- Status: Residential flats
- Architectural style: French Gothic
- Location: 40, Queen's Drive, Glasgow, Scotland
- Coordinates: 55°49′55″N 4°15′41″W
- Groundbreaking: 1872
- Completed: 1873
- Closed: 2000 (as a church)

Design and construction
- Architects: Campbell Douglas & James Sellars

Listed Building – Category A
- Designated: 5 December 1989
- Reference no.: LB32451

Crosshill Queen's Park Church is a 19th-century former Church of Scotland parish church near Queen's Park in Glasgow. Nowadays, the building has been converted into residential flats.

== History ==
The building was founded as Queen's Park Established Church. It was built in the French Gothic style between 1872 and 1873 on designs by Campbell Douglas and James Sellars. A steeple was also built of Franco-German inspiration, with an octagonal stone spire. The church was completed and opened on 12 October 1873.

Upon union with the Church of Scotland in 1929, the church was renamed Queen's Park High Church, to distinguish it from Queen's Park West Church. A large stained glass window by Charles Paine, depicting the adoration of the Magi, was added in 1957. In 1972, the parish of Crosshill Victoria, united with Queen's Park High to form Crosshill Queen's Park Church. In 1999, due to a decline in the congregation, plans were made to merge Crosshill Queen's Park with Strathbungo Queen's Park. The final service at Crosshill Queen's Park Church was held on Sunday, 13 February 2000, while the union of the parishes came into effect on 16 February. Consequently, the Crosshill Queen's Park Church building was sold and eventually converted into residential flats between 2002 and 2004. The listing category of the building was changed from B to A in December 1989.
