= Queen's Park Govanhill Parish Church =

Queen's Park Govanhill
- Queen's Park Govanhill Parish Church
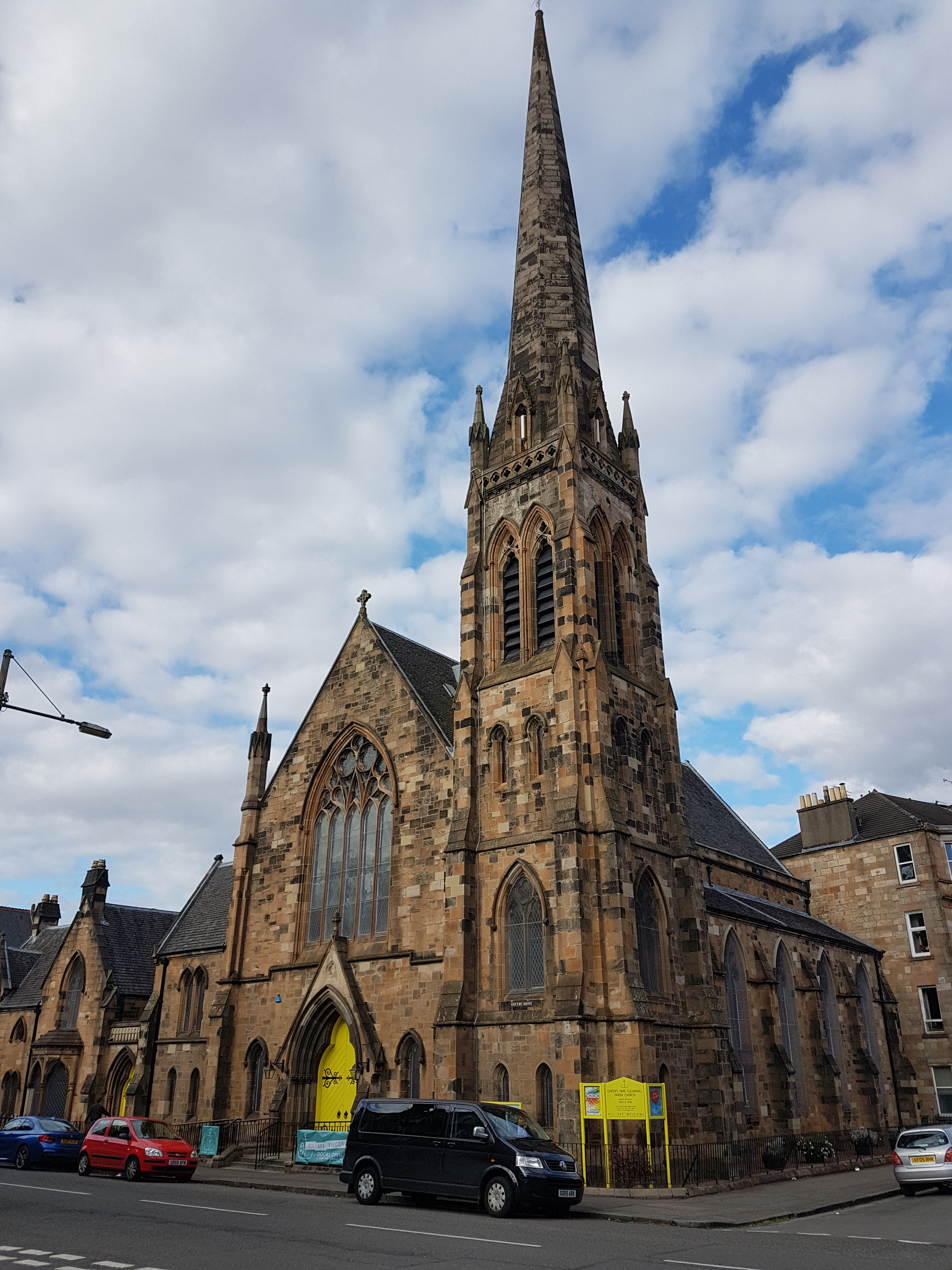
- The church in 2017
- Queen's Park Govanhill
- 55°50′05″N 4°16′11″W
- Location: Glasgow
- Country: Scotland
- Denomination: Church of Scotland
- Website: Church Website

History
- Status: Active

Architecture
- Functional status: Parish church
- Architect: James Thompson
- Architectural type: Church
- Style: Neo-Gothic
- Years built: 1874–1875
- Groundbreaking: 28 February 1874
- Completed: 16 May 1875

Administration
- Parish: Queen's Park Govanhill

Listed Building – Category B
- Designated: 5 December 1989
- Reference no.: LB32457

Queen's Park Govanhill Parish Church is a 19th-century Parish church of the Church of Scotland located in the south side of Glasgow, near Queen's Park, from which the church's name derives.

== Foundation and construction ==
The church was founded as the Queen's Park Free Church, as a congregation of the Free Church of Scotland. The congregation was formed in December 1866. The current church building was designed by James Thomson and was built between 1874 and 1875. The foundation stone was laid on 28 February 1874 by Patrick Playfair, Lord Dean of Guild, and the church building was completed in a little over a year. It was dedicated and opened for use on 16 May 1875. The church was built in the Neo-Gothic style, with a corner spire. The church halls were added in 1879.

== Development of the congregation ==
In 1900, after the union between the Free Church of Scotland and the United Presbyterian Church to form the United Free Church of Scotland, the church was renamed Queen's Park West United Free Church. The name was once more changed, this time to Queen's Park West Parish Church, after the merger of the United Free Church of Scotland with the Church of Scotland in 1929.

In 1979, Strathbungo Parish Church was closed and the congregation united with Queen's Park West to form the parish of Strathbungo Queen's Park, a change from Queen's Park West. In 1983, the Presbytery of Glasgow had agreed on a Basis of Association, an agreement between Strathbungo Queen's Park and Camphill Queen's Park (present-day Camphill Queen's Park Baptist Church), that upon the retirement or resignation of either church minister, the Strathbungo Queen's Park building would close and the congregation would move to the Camphill building. However, the agreement was amended in October 1990, deciding in favour of retaining the Strathbungo Queen's Park building instead of the Camphill building, the latter closing some years later and subsequently sold to the Baptist Church.

In February 2000, Crosshill Queen's Park Parish (a union of the original Queen's Park High and Crosshill Victoria which united in 1972) united with Strathbungo Queen's Park, retaining the Strathbungo Queen's Park building, while the Crosshill Queen's Park was sold. The new name for the church and parish was Queen's Park Parish Church. The latest union and name change occurred in 2014, when the congregation of Govanhill Trinity Church united with Queen's Park, choosing the new name Queen's Park Govanhill Parish Church.

== Works of art ==
The church has a galleried interior with two tiers of cast-iron columns and a barrel-vaulted roof. There are also a number of stained glass windows by Daniel Cottier, including some wall decoration which was uncovered and restored in 2008. An additional window was installed after WWII by Douglas Hamilton commemorating Jane Haining, a Church of Scotland missionary, who was arrested by the Gestapo in April 1944, and imprisoned in Auschwitz concentration camp, where she died in July 1944. The church also contains a number of war memorials of the various parish churches that once existed, but which merged with Queen's Park Govanhill Parish Church through the years. These include memorials of the parishes of Queen's Park West (present-day Queen's Park Govanhill), Strathbungo (converted into flats), Queen's Park High (converted into flats) and Crosshill Victoria (present-day Al-Farooq Education and Community Centre). The church was extensively renovated and restored between the late 1990s and 2006.

== Controversies ==
The church made national headlines in 2018 when its then minister Californian Elijah Wade Smith was accused of a string of sexual misconduct allegations, most notably masturbating in front of a female colleague, abusing his former girlfriend and developing a relationship with a teenage parishioner. Following an inquiry which investigated and proved the claims, he was removed from post in 2019.
