= Camphill =

Camphill may refer to:

- The 20th-century Camphill Movement social change initiative
- The Woolton Woods and Camp Hill park in Liverpool, England, sometimes written "Camphill"
- Camphill Queen's Park Baptist Church, church in Glasgow, Scotland
- Camphill, Derbyshire, an area of Great Hucklow
