= New Victoria Hospital =

- NHS Greater Glasgow and Clyde
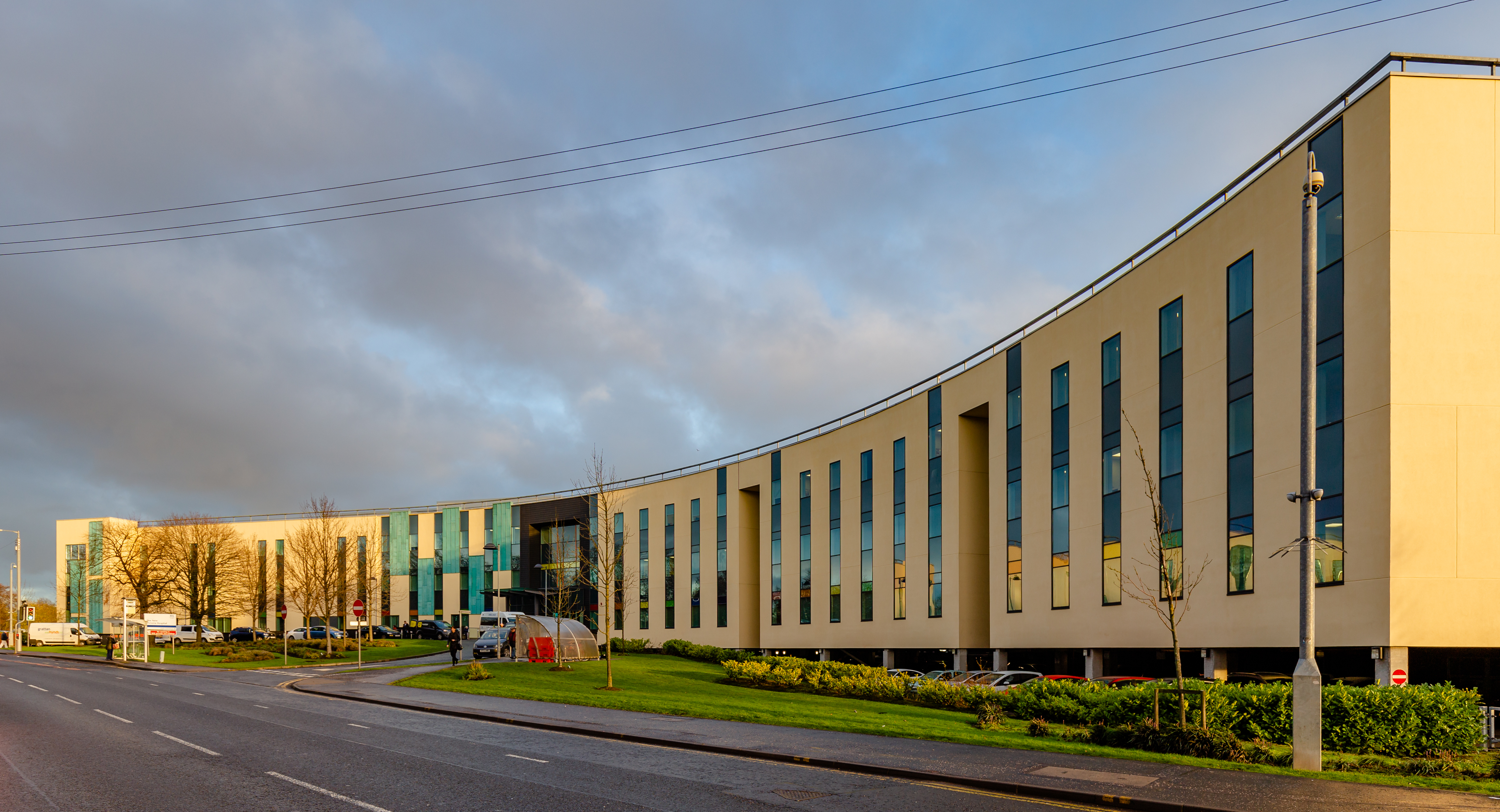
- New Victoria Hospital

- Shown in Glasgow

Geography
- Location: 55 Grange Road, G42 9LL, Glasgow, Scotland
- Coordinates: 55.82869°N 4.26332°W

Organisation
- Care system: NHS Scotland
- Type: Ambulatory care
- Affiliated university: University of Glasgow; Glasgow Caledonian University

Services
- Emergency department: minor injuries unit

History
- Founded: 2009

Links
- Website: New Victoria Hospital
- Lists: Hospitals in Scotland

The New Victoria Hospital is an ambulatory care hospital situated at Langside/Battlefield in the south-east of Glasgow, Scotland. It is managed by NHS Greater Glasgow and Clyde.

== History ==
The hospital, which was commissioned to replace the outpatient health care services previously provided by Glasgow Victoria Infirmary, was built on a site previously occupied by Queen's Park Public School. The construction work, which was carried out by Balfour Beatty at a cost of £100 million, began in December 2006 and was completed in early April 2009.

== Services ==
The hospital was designed to treat around 400,000 annually. The facilities include 30 single-bed rooms with en-suite wet room and 30 rooms with four bays. There are eight operating theatres and 12 short-stay surgical beds. There is an MRI scanner and diagnostic services and specialist services such as cardiology, renal dialysis and gynaecology. The building was given an 'excellent' BREEAM rating. Features were incorporated to reduce the impact of traffic noise from the surrounding area.
