= List of Scotland-based production companies =

This is a list of filmmaking companies based in Scotland. The list includes both active and no longer active (defunct) companies. Active production companies are either run by themselves or as a subsidiary of another company.

== Notable production companies ==
Legend
Active
Defunct

Name	Est.	City	Key people	Notable films	Notes
Oddness Ltd	2020	Glasgow	Kieran Howe		
29 Studios Ltd	2009	Glasgow	Lynne McGunigal; Gillian O'Neil; Kevin O'Neil		
55 Degrees Ltd	2000	Glasgow	Roger Booth; Russell Henderson; Simon Tricker		Dissolved on 21 Nov 2013
Ancell Media Ltd.	2015	Glasgow	Alexander Torrance; Calum Ansell		
AuldLands Films Ltd	2018	Glasgow	Dimitri Lemoine; Thomas Lemoine		
B4 Films Ltd	2008	Aberdeen	Christopher Brown; James Brown; Lesley Brown; Jonathan Brown		
Bad Monkey Ltd	2011	Glasgow	David Newman		Dissolved on 22 September 2020
Black Bear Productions Ltd	1998	Edinburgh	Richard Donald Ord		Dissolved on 27 September 2016
Black Camel Pictures Company Ltd	2004	Glasgow	Arabella Croft; Kieran Parker	Sunshine on Leith (2013); Outpost 2: Black Sun (2012); Legacy (2009); Outpost (2008)	
Blue Iris Films Ltd	2011	Edinburgh	Katie Crook; Olivia Gifford	Betrayal; Liar; Joyride	
Bona Broadcasting Ltd	2003	Edinburgh	Turan Ali; Iain Hay	Slate of gay	
Brett Currie	2019	Edinburgh			
[BrightWolf Films	2018	Edinburgh	Magnus Wake Simone Bett		
Broken Blonde Ltd	2012	Edinburgh			
Burning Horseshoe Productions Ltd	2012	Midlothian	Douglas Caldow; Renate Farkas; Simon McCay; Adam Ordog	The Dying Eye (2013); The Priest with Two Guns (2013); Close Encounters (2013); I.F (2012)	Dissolved on 13 November 2018
Caesura Media	2020	Glasgow			
Cadies Productions Ltd	2001	Edinburgh	Robin Mitchell	And So Goodbye	
Caledonia TV Productions Ltd	1992	Glasgow	Stephen Foster; Faye Maclean; Sajid Quayum; Seona Robertson; Leslie Wilson		
Caledonian Television	1986	Edinburgh	Matt Quinn	Doorstoppers!	
Capricorn Film Productions Ltd	2006	Glasgow	Suzanne Reid	The Pedestrian (2011); Saved (2011); Alfonso (2009); Daddy (2008)	
Cinemate Ltd	2010	Glasgow	Simon Ferguson; Gregg Houston		Formerly known as Artist Media Ltd
Classic Video Productions Ltd	1982	Glasgow	Martin O'Hare; Thomas O'Hare		
Clyde Digital, Glasgow	2017	Glasgow	Gordon Connelly; Gordon Connelly		
Completely Normal Media Ltd		Edinburgh	Kevin Laverty-Glover Lois Mosconti		
Concept Productions Ltd	1985	Aberdeen	Lynn Llewellyn; Michael Lloyd-Wiggins; Andrew Wilson		
Creation Editor Ltd	2010	Edinburgh	Sabine Klaus		Dissolved on 2 July 2019
Crystal Media Ltd	1996	Edinburgh	Francis Kirwan; Elke Williams; Philip Williams		Dissolved on 16 September 2015
Cutscene Media Ltd	2014	Edinburgh	Richie Morgan; Barry Topping		Dissolved on 27 February 2018
Custom Flavour Ltd	2018	Edinburgh	Alan Ciechalski		
Dark Form Productions Ltd	2013	Glasgow		Innocent Violation (2012); To Make Me Feel Your Love (2012)	Dissolved on 29 March 2016
Digital Onset	2014	East Lothian	Grant McPhee	Big Gold Dream	
DX Films Ltd	2012	Edinburgh			
Ear Trumpet Media	2010	Edinburgh	Nicol J Craig	Pulp; Dublin In Pieces	
EDFEST.TV Ltd	2007	Edinburgh	Marnie Anderson; John Garrow		Dissolved on 8 Mar 2013
Edinburgh Film Company	2012	Edinburgh	Luke Moodley; Simon Ray	'Beyond Likeness'. A film with Victoria Crowe 'Voyage into the deepest darkest blue'. A film with Dovecot Studios. 'What is a Portrait'. A film with National Portrait Gallery Scotland.	
Edit 123 Ltd	1993	Glasgow		The Hawk & the Dove (2002)	
Effingee Productions Ltd	2000	Glasgow	Ford Kiernan		
Encaptivate Films Ltd.	2018	Edinburgh	Simone Bett Magnus Wake	Dark Sense (2019) The Great Game (2025) Simon, First and Only (2016)	
Enterprise Screen Productions Ltd	2005	Glasgow	Brendan Smith; Jamie Smith; Jay Smith; Sarah Hellings; Gavin Hopkins; Ali McLauchlan; Ewan Fletcher	Fire and Sand: How Glass is Made (2015) Mind Games: Mental Health in Scottish Football (2014) Power of Attorney TV Campaign (2014)	Operates offices in Glasgow, Washington DC and Toledo Ohio
Event Video Services Ltd	2008	Edinburgh	Andrew Crow		Dissolved on 6 June 2017
Extra Veg Ltd	1996	Edinburgh			
Fablevision Studios Ltd	2007	Glasgow	Elizabeth Gardiner; Gordon Hunter; Agnes Porter	Two More Than Most (2013)	
Finlay Marketing	2019	Glasgow			
Fluid Eye Productions Ltd	2006	Edinburgh		Run Tony Run! (2006); Edie's P.O.V. (2006); Suburban Home (2005)	
Film Colorist	2018	Edinburgh			
Film Cut Post Limited	2011	Edinburgh	Matt Williams		
Forest Of Black Ltd	2005	Glasgow	Oscar Sansom; Beth Allan Michael Sherrington		
Forza Films	2022	Glasgow	Stuart Elliott		
Freak Films Ltd	2006	Edinburgh	Hamish Allison; Claire Deas		
Freedonia Films Ltd	1994	Edinburgh	Kathleen Cox; Patrick Hickey	About a Band (2011); William McLaren: An Artist Out of Time (2010); The Dungeon Moor Killings (2009); Frozen (2005)	
Futurist Digital Ltd	2005	North Lanarkshire	Stephen Johnson		
Giles Productions Ltd	1997	Edinburgh			Dissolved on 13 Nov 2009; Formerly known as Red Kite Productions Ltd
Glasgow Film Productions Ltd	2004	Glasgow	Alexander Mccall		
Glass Bullet Productions Ltd	2007	Fife	Laura Binnie; Graeme Campbell		
Great Silence Media Ltd	2009	Edinburgh	Colan Mehaffey; Iain Miller		Dissolved on 26 April 2016
GlobalSound Productions	2006	Stirlingshire	D Faulds; L Redelinghuys		
Greenroom Films Ltd	2000	Edinburgh	Lucy Ball		
Haphazard Media Ltd	2007	Dumfriesshire		Exodus 21:24 (2014); Toast (2013); Zombie Musical (2011); Time, Care and Attention (2009)	
Story + Stage	1991	Inverness	David Eglinton		
Head Gear Films Ltd	2002	Aberdeen	Gregory Cruttwell; Philip Hunt; Shaun Ross	Desert Dancer (2014); The Little Death (2014); Spike Island (2012); The Rise (2012)	
Heehaw Ltd	2000	Edinburgh	Toby Trueman	Meet You in Scotland (2022)Tiktok Queen at 16 (2021)Not Seeing Straight (2021)Covid Y Jab A Ni (2021)	
Hopscotch Films Ltd	1999	Glasgow	John Archer; Clara Glynn Carolynne Sinclair	Arcadia (2017); Accidental Anarchist (2017); The Carer (2016); I Am Belfast (2015); The Story of Film: An Odyssey (2011)	
Hot Tap Media Ltd	2011	Glasgow	Rebecca Thompson		
Interference Pattern Ltd	2008	Edinburgh	Tom Bryant		
Ironstar Films Ltd	2017	Arbroath	Graeme Carr; Dean Pearson; Allan Jennings; Peter Birnie	Bloodloss (2015); The Clearing (2016); Best friends come in boxes (2016); A Private Revolution (2016); 1416: The Beginning (2019); Tellurian (2020)	
Ko Lik Films Ltd	2004	Edinburgh	Neil James Jack; James Andrew Cameron Fraser	Ujbaz IzbenekiI Has Lost His Soul (2006); Fatal Distraction (2004); Show Ponies (2004); The Tree Officer (2003)	
L A Media Ltd	2001	Edinburgh	Louise Adams; Justin Adams		
La Belle Allee Productions Ltd	2001	Glasgow	Karen Smyth	Tracks (2006); Ma Boy (2006); Caffalic Educashun (2004)	
Learning Curve Education Ltd	2011	Edinburgh			
LifeUp Productions Ltd	2012	Glasgow	John McFarlane; John McMurtrie; Christopher Muir; Joseph Thomas	One(2013)	Dissolved on 24 Oct 2014
Maïdo Films Ltd	2020	Glasgow	Xavier Coll		
Mallard Productions Ltd	2009	Glasgow	Tim Mallard		
MakeMeAFilm.com Ltd	2013	Glasgow			
Martin Films	2019	Edinburgh	Andrew Martin	The David McDonald Report	
Mark Flood Animations Ltd	2014	Glasgow	Mark Flood		
M&B Arts Productions	2010	Edinburgh	Mina Radovic Boris Bosilkov	Iris	Dissolved in 2020
Melt the Fly Ltd	2018	Edinburgh	Austen McCowan Will Hewitt	Sink or Skim	
M.I.C. Productions Ltd	2000	Aberdeen	Andrew Philip Wood		Dissolved on 16 Dec 2011
Mirage Television Productions Ltd	2011	Edinburgh	Douglas Bogie Gray		
Muckle Hen Productions Ltd	2003	Edinburgh	Shona Donaldson		
Native Film	2010	Glasgow	Martin Burt		Production Corporate films/brand content Commercials
Nexus Digital Media Ltd	2008	Edinburgh	Kerrie Doris; Peter Richard Doris		
Northern Collective	2014	Aberdeen			
One-Eyed Dog Scotland Ltd	2008	Edinburgh	Cassian Hall; Ishbel Hall; Matthew Hall; Gordon Newman		
Onit Studio Ltd	2018	Glasgow	Lewis Gilfillan Christopher Sproat Declan Leach		
Oscus Media Ltd	2005	Edinburgh			
Partickular Films	2011	Glasgow	Joseph Andrew Mclean		
Plum Films Ltd	2002	Edinburgh	Tina Louise Foster; James MacDonald	Dread (2009); Book of Blood (2009); Senseless (2008); Meat the Campbells (2005); Arts: The Catalyst (2005); Tumshie McFadgen's Bid for Ultimate Bliss (2004)	
Polifilm Media Ltd	2012	Edinburgh	Tomas Sheridan		
Production Attic Ltd	2011	Glasgow	Matthew Cowan; Darren Eggenschwiler; Stephen Paton; Andrew Robertson	The Unchecked Rampage of the Infamous Gangsteristas (2013); Pushing Buttons (2013); 30 Seconds Apart (2012); Mugging for Amateurs (2012); Rough-House (2012)	
Quick Off The Mark Productions Ltd	2009	Glasgow	Mark Ferguson; Christopher Quick	The Greyness of Autumn (2012); Mr Cheval (2012); In Search of La Che (2011)	
Quipu TV Ltd	2011	Glasgow	David Holmes; Jack McGill; Michael Stanger		
Rapid Visual Media	2010	Edinburgh	Brian Ross; Douglas Walker		Rebranded as STROMA Films in 2018
Raptor Filmz Ltd	2012	Livingston	Christopher Young		
Republic Productions Ltd	2000	Edinburgh	Marnie Anderson; Jack Garrow		
SDI Productions Ltd	2007	Edinburgh	Sonja Henrici; Noemie Mendelle		
See It Off Productions Ltd	2021	Edinburgh	Hester Middleton Archie Middleton	Out Of Town (2021) Ice Melts (2021) Earth Is Flat (2022) 26.2 (2023) Room Temperature (2025)	
Serious Facilities Ltd	1998	Glasgow	Allan Cull; Eleanor Cull; Simon Cull		
Shining Example Films Ltd	2013	Glasgow	Christopher Goldie; Gordon Holliday; Andrew Stewart	Split (2014); Dysmorphia (2012)	Dissolved on 18 Oct 2016
Six4 Productions	2017	Glasgow	Lee Phillips	Aerial: Jinde Meriye (2019) Bollywood Film Aerial: Street Gangs (2023) TV Series	
Sigma Films Ltd	1996	Glasgow	Brian Coffey; David Mackenzie; Zara Berrie	Starred Up (2013); Perfect Sense (2011); Hallam Foe (2007)	
Sole Media Business Services	2011	Glasgow	Iain McIntosh Seth Gardner		
Silly Wee Films Ltd	2011	Glasgow	Fraser Coull	Night Is Day: The Movie (2012); I Heart You (2010); Hush (2010); Bottle (2005)	Dissolved on 23 Aug 2013
Skyline Productions Ltd	1996	Edinburgh	Leslie Hills	Rivers and Tides (2001); Leaning into the Wind (2018); Breathing Earth (2012); Living Lightly (2007); Touch the Sound: A Sound Journey with Evelyn Glennie (2004); Women in Black (2004)	
Skywolf Productions Ltd	2012	Glasgow	Leesa Mcinnes; Craig Walker		
Smudge Digital	2012	Glasgow	Nicole Anderson; Lauren Kerr		
SNAP Studio	2018	Aberdeen	Will Farquhar James Galbraith		
Sorepaw Productions Ltd	2009	Glasgow	Suzanne Hendry; James Cuzen; Karen Flynn	A Year and a Day (2012)	
Speakeasy Productions Ltd	1993	Perth	Simone Bett; Jeremy Hewitt; Shona Johnstone; Mark Mckenna; Jonathan Young		
Stepping Stone Films Ltd	2008	Glasgow	Sarmed Mirza	An Act of Terror (2009)	Dissolved on 21 Sep 2012
Strange Boat Ltd	2004	Edinburgh	David Barras; Gillian Black		
STROMA Films	2010	Edinburgh	Brian Ross; Douglas Walker		Previously knowns as Rapid Visual Media
Studio Scotland Ltd	2003	Inverkeithing	Stewart Menelaws Deborah Forrest	The Daniel Connection (2014) The Daniel Project (2010) Spirit of Discovery (2017) Cup of Trembling (1996)	
Sync or Swim Productions Ltd	2011	Glasgow	Kerr Castle; Philip Duncan; Scott Mackay		
Tenbobflix Ltd	2009	Glasgow	Graham Maciver		Dissolved on 13 Jul 2012
The Polka Dot Factory Ltd	2010	Edinburgh	Victoria Thomas		
Theatre Workshop Scotland Ltd	1975	Edinburgh	Jeremy Anderson; Robin Harper; John Murphy; Robert Rae; Andrew Taylor	The Happy Lands (2012); Trouble Sleeping (2008)	Longest Running Company on the List
Those Media Guys Ltd	2005	Edinburgh	Colin Perry		
Transmission Productions	2007	Edinburgh	Joe Carter		
Turkey Red Media	2016	Glasgow	Martin Gillon Craig Jump	BBC Highland Series, (Drone Services) The Loch, (Drone Services) Flour Power, (Drone Services)	
TVP Film & Multimedia Ltd	1996	Aberdeen	Ranald Wood; Richard Wood	Sawney: Flesh of Man (2012); Forgotten Souls (2007)	
Urbancroft Ltd	2007	Glasgow	Martyn Robertson; Louise Storrie	Marty Goes to Hollywood (2014); A Cuillin Rising (2011)	
Vivid Films Ltd	2007	Edinburgh			Dissolved on 30 Oct 2009
Waltzer Films	2001	Edinburgh	Ruth Barrie Glenda Rome	Callum Easter, TV Special (2022) Be Different Today (2019)	
Wandern Media Ltd	2016	Glasgow	David McCourt Emma Bryceland		
Worrying Drake Productions Ltd	2014	Falkirk			
YouMore Ltd	2020	Edinburgh	Alex Richards, Aalyn Wild		
Young Films	1986	Isle of Skye	Christopher Young Sarah-Jane Campbell	The Inbetweeners (2008–2010) The Inbetweeners Movie (2011); Bannan (2014–2022); Venus Peter (1989); Silent Roar (2022)	

== See also ==
- List of film production companies
- Media of Scotland
- Media in Glasgow
