= George Wallace, Baron Wallace of Campsie =

Scottish businessman

George Wallace

Baron Wallace of Campsie
- In office 1974–1997

Personal details
- Born: 13 February 1915
- Died: 23 December 1997 (aged 82)
- Occupation: businessman

Military service
- Branch/service: Royal Air Force

George Wallace, Baron Wallace of Campsie KStJ DL (13 February 1915 – 23 December 1997) was a Scottish businessman and life peer.

== Biography ==
Educated at Abbotsford Primary School and Queen's Park Secondary School in Glasgow, Wallace served in the RAF during the Second World War. In 1950, he founded the Wallace Cameron and Company, manufacturers of first aid supplies, which at it peak employed over 300 employees in its Glasgow factory.

Wallace was appointed to the West Scotland Advisory Board in 1965, serving as chairperson between 1972 and 1982, and the East Kilbride Development Corporation, which he served two terms as chair. In 1971, he was appointed a deputy lieutenant for Glasgow. In 1975, he was one of the founding members of the Scottish Development Agency. He also served as chairperson of the Institute of Marketing, president of the Glasgow Chamber of Commerce and on the South of Scotland Electricity Board.

On the 28 June 1974 he was awarded a life peerage as Baron Wallace of Campsie of Newlands in the County of the City of Glasgow, he subsequently formally entered the House on the 24 July 1974. In 1992, his charitable work with the Salvation Army was honoured by his name adorning the Wallace of Campsie Lifehouse in Gallowgate, which provides emergency homelessness accommodation.

He was married to Irene Alice Langdon Wallace, whom he predeceased at the age of 82 on the 23 December 1997. She died aged 91 on the 3 April 2018.
