= Media of Scotland =

There are several types of mass media in Scotland: television, cinema, radio, newspapers, magazines, game design and websites. The majority of Scotland's media is located in Glasgow, the countries largest city, which serves as the HQ for much of the countries major media employers such as broadcasters BBC Scotland and STV, radio services including BBC Radio Scotland, Clyde 1 and Pure Radio Scotland. Game design and production company, Rockstar North, has its international offices in the countries capital city, Edinburgh.

Scotland has a number of production companies which produce films and television programmes for Scottish, British and international audiences. Production companies are mostly located in Scotland's cities including Glasgow, Edinburgh and Aberdeen, as well as production facilities in areas such as North Lanarkshire, Fife and Dumfriesshire. Wardpark Studios in Cumbernauld is one of Scotland's television and film production studios where the television programme Outlander is produced. Dumbarton Studios, located in Dumbarton is largely used for BBC Scotland programming, used for the filming and production of television programmes such as Still Game, River City, Two Doors Down, and Shetland.

Popular films associated with Scotland through Scottish production or being filmed in Scotland include Braveheart (1995), Highlander (1986), Trainspotting (1996), Red Road (2006), Neds (2010), The Angel's Share (2012), Brave (2012) and Outlaw King (2018). Popular television programmes associated with Scotland include the long running BBC Scotland soap opera River City which has been broadcast since 2002, Still Game, a popular Scottish sitcom broadcast throughout the United Kingdom (2002–2007, revived in 2016), Rab C. Nesbitt, Two Doors Down and Take the High Road. The Rig (2023) was the first Amazon Prime Video production to be filmed and produced entirely in Scotland.

== Broadcasting ==
=== Television ===
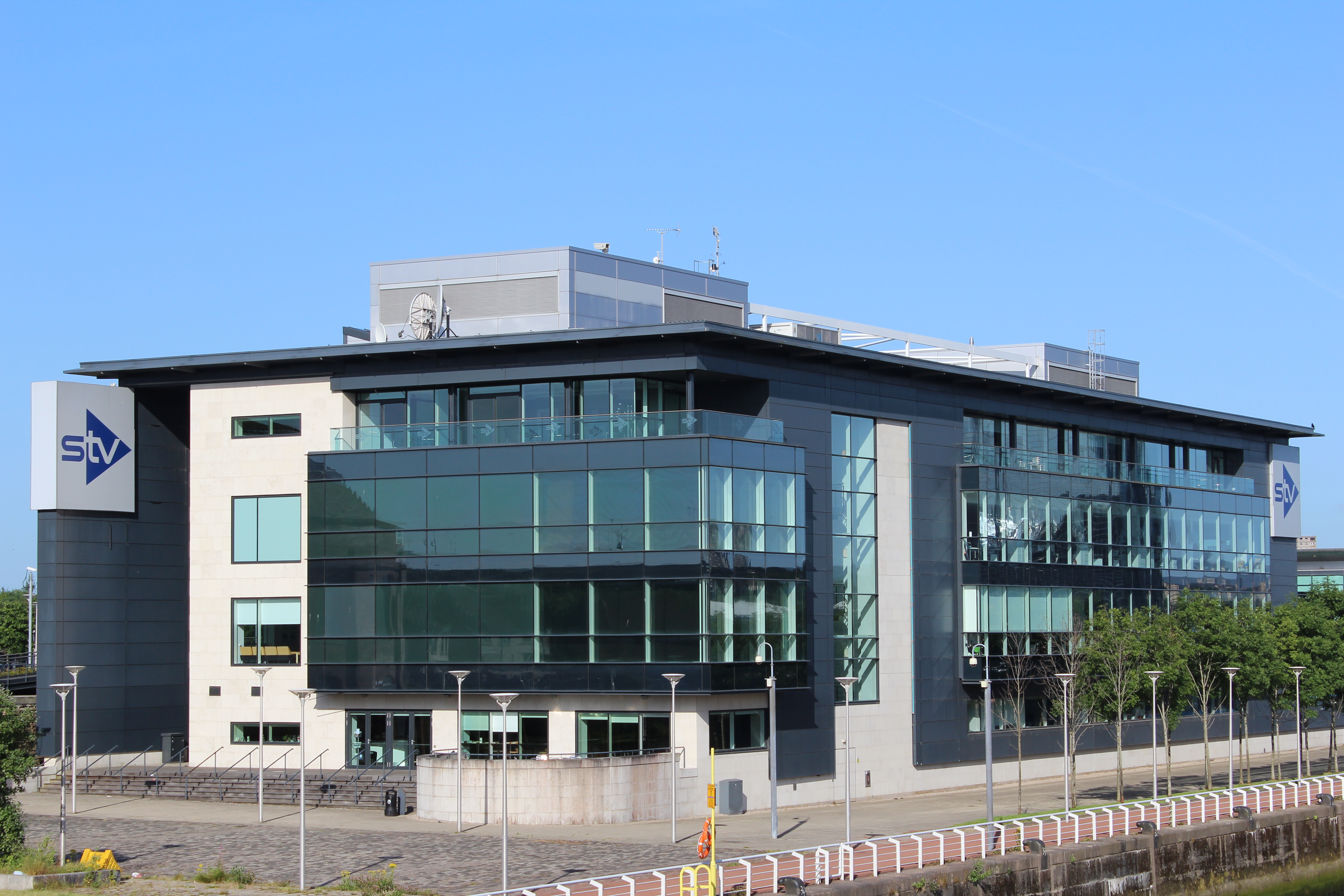
The HQ and production studios of STV is located in Glasgow

BBC Scotland runs two national television stations. Much of the output of BBC Scotland Television, such as local news, current affairs and sport programmes are intended for broadcast within Scotland, whilst others, for example many drama and comedy programmes, aim at audiences throughout the United Kingdom and worldwide markets.

Three ITV stations also broadcast in Scotland. STV broadcasts to the majority of the Scottish population. Although branded as one channel, it is composed of two stations: STV Central and STV North, both of which are both owned by STV Group plc. ITV Border broadcasts in the South of Scotland.

BBC Alba is the only Gaelic language television service available in Scotland, broadcasting digital terrestrial platform Freeview, as well as Sky, Virgin Media and Freesat.

In 2014, STV Group plc launched two super-local TV services, STV Glasgow in 2014 and STV Edinburgh in 2015. Following the awarding of local broadcasting licences for Aberdeen, Ayr and Dundee in 2015 to STV Group, it combined its two existing stations with the new licences and relaunched the new stations as a single network, branded STV2 in April 2017. This channel was closed down the following year.

==== Channels ====
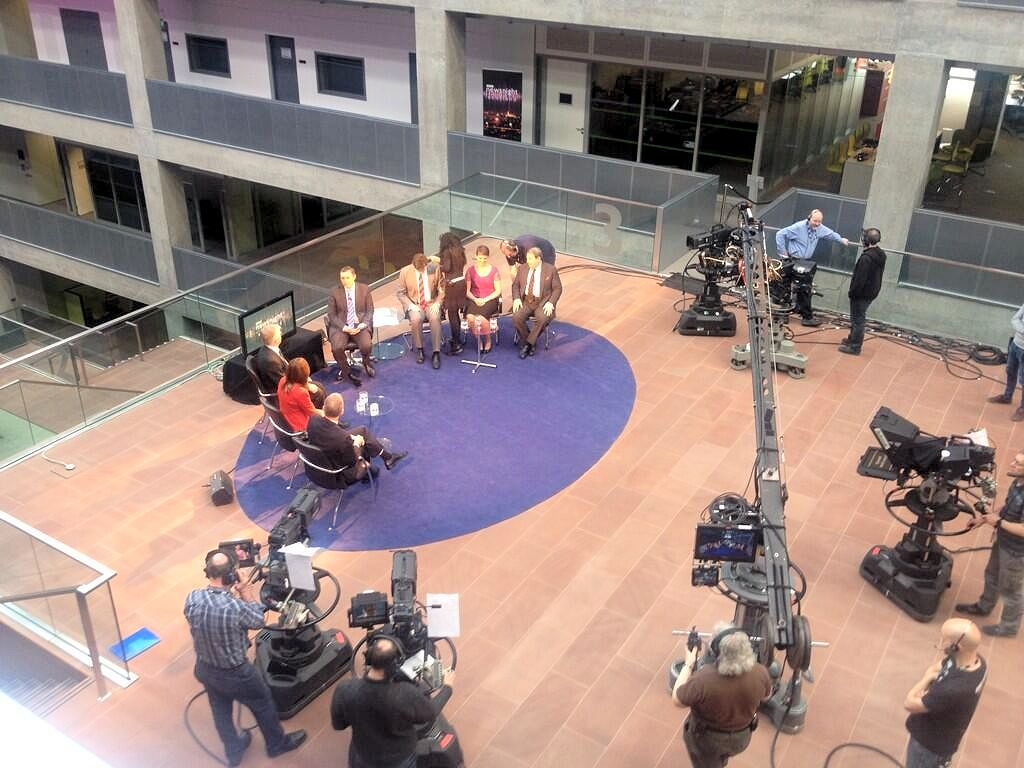
Preparations for recording Newsnight Scotland at Pacific Quay, Glasgow

===== Current =====
- BBC One Scotland
- BBC Scotland
- BBC Alba
- ITV1 Border (Dumfries and Galloway and Scottish Borders only)
- STV
- That's TV Scotland

===== Defunct =====
- BBC Two Scotland
- Celtic TV
- Grampian Television
- Rangers TV
- S2
- Scottish Television
- Sky Scottish
- STV Edinburgh
- STV Glasgow
- STV2
- TeleG
- Thistle TV

=== Programming ===
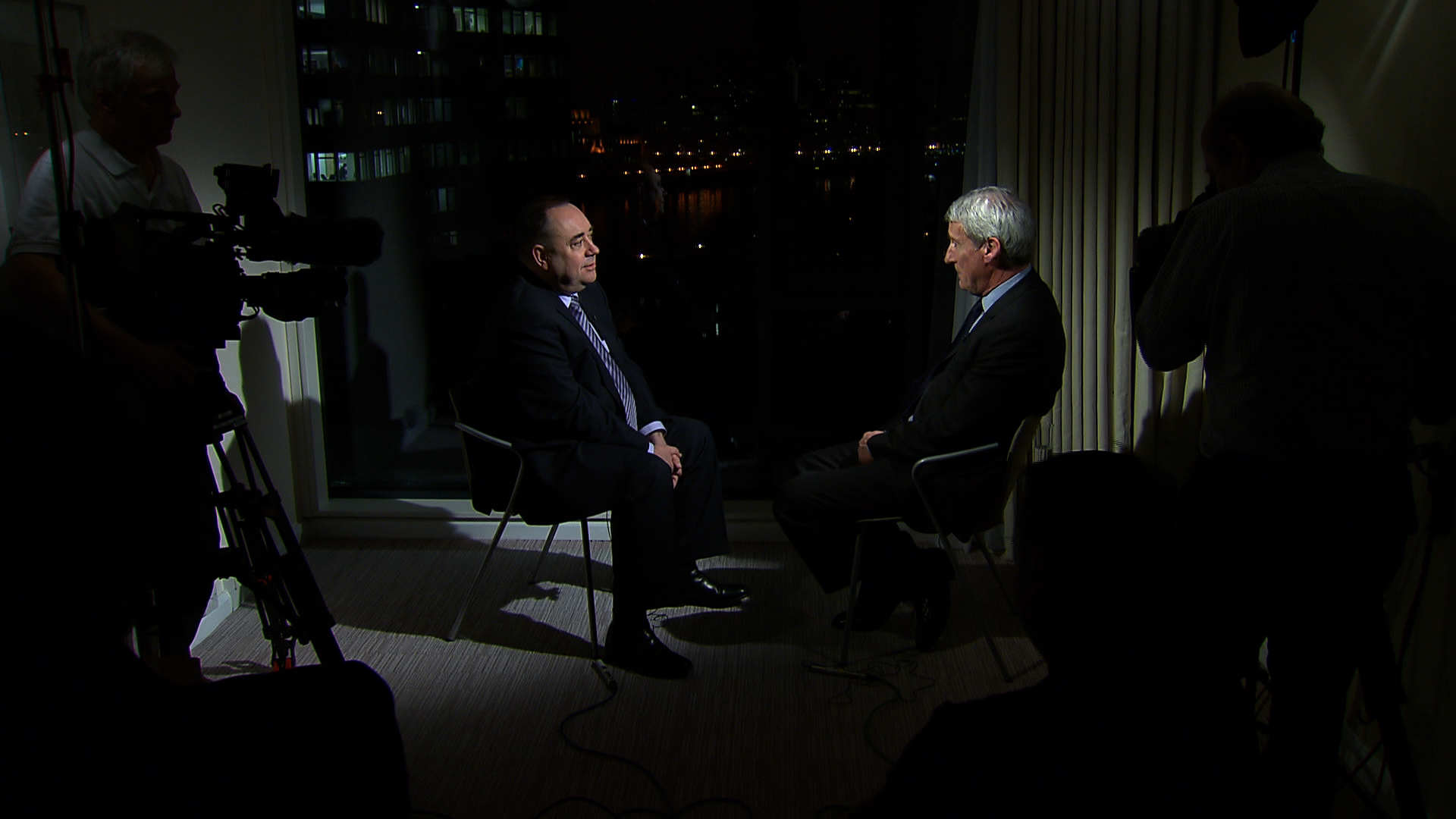
First Minister Alex Salmond being interviewed by BBC Scotland for Newsnight Scotland, 2012

A number of programmes are broadcast in Scotland focusing on all aspects of Scottish life; news and current affairs, sports and entertainment. The majority of television programming is produced and broadcast by the two main broadcasters in Scotland – BBC Scotland and STV. Distinct programming of BBC Scotland include Reporting Scotland, Newsnight Scotland, Sportscene, BBC Scotland Investigates, BBC Scotland's Hogmanay, The Nine, A View from the Terrace, The Sunday Show and Sport Nation.

The BBC is required to spend at least 8% of its budget on programming and production in Scotland. A review in 2021 found that the BBC had failed to comply with this target, with OFCOM claiming that the cooperation only had spent 6.5% of its budget in Scotland during 2020–2021.

STV programming includes a variety of current affairs, news, entertainment and drama productions; Scotland Tonight, STV News, Scotsport, The Five Thirty Show, The Hour, The Late Show with Ewen Cameron, The Nightshift, Live at Five, Debate Night, Talking Scotland and STV Children's Appeal.

Both BBC Scotland and STV (as part of STV Studios) also produce a number of television programming and series for broadcast both across the United Kingdom and internationally such as Mrs. Brown's Boys, The Link, This Is Your Life, Antiques Road Trip, Art Attack, Beechgrove, A Question of Genius, The National Lottery: In It to Win It, The Weakest Link and Who Dares Wins.

=== Radio ===
Scotland has its own BBC services which include the national radio stations, BBC Radio Scotland and Scottish Gaelic language service, BBC Radio nan Gaidheal, which is available in the North of Scotland. There are also a number of BBC and independent local radio stations throughout the country. Other major radio stations specific to Scotland and feature Scottish broadcasting content include Capital Scotland, Heart Scotland, Smooth Scotland, Nation Radio Scotland, Go Radio, Clyde 1 (Glasgow) and Clyde 1 (Ayrshire).

== Print ==
=== Newspapers ===
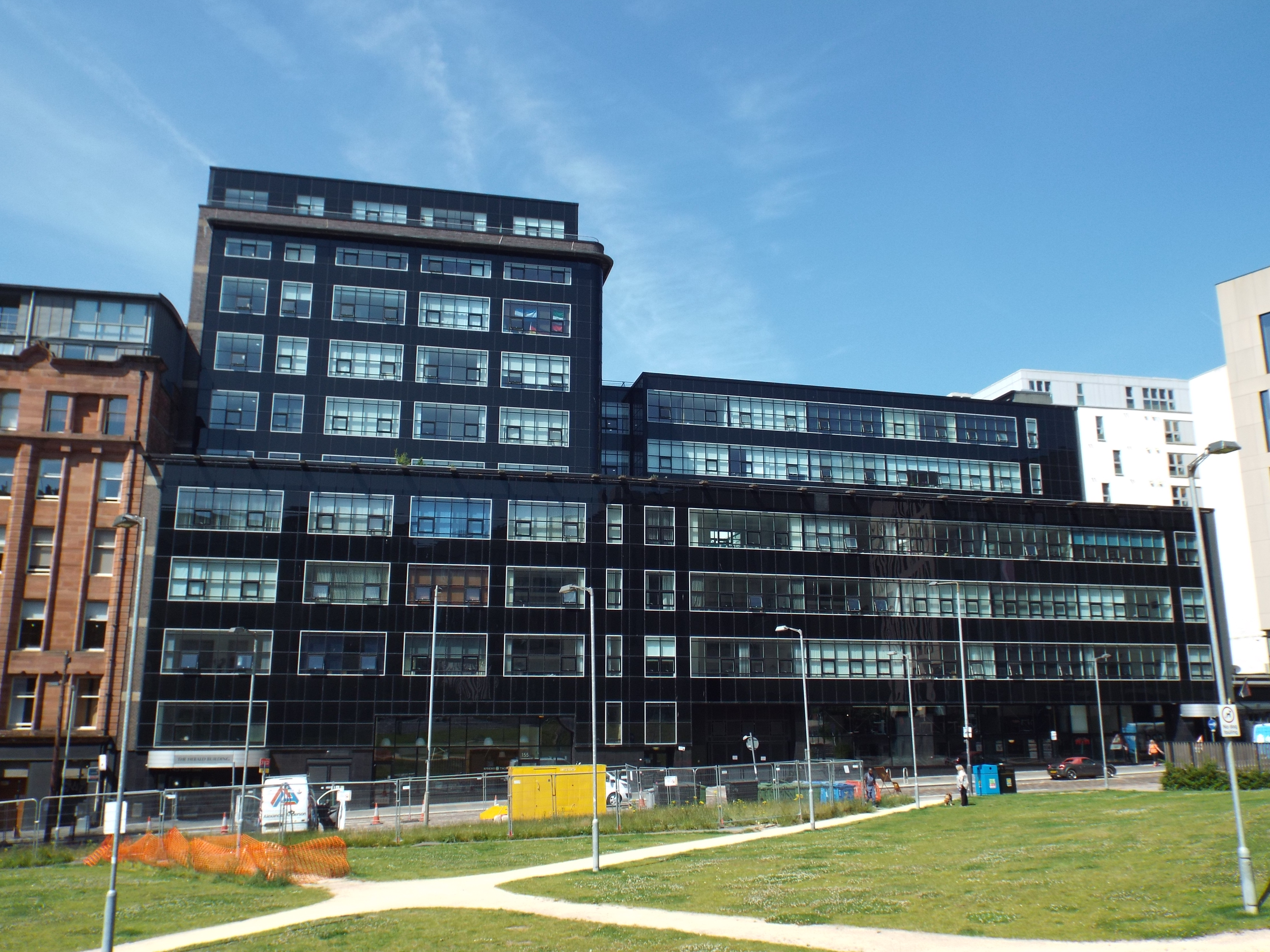
HQ of The Herald in Glasgow

There are four national daily newspapers in Scotland:

- The Daily Record (Trinity Mirror) is Scotland's leading tabloid
- The Scotsman (National World), based in Edinburgh, is a former broadsheet now printed in tabloid format
- The Herald (Newsquest), based in Glasgow, is Scotland's only broadsheet newspaper
- The National (Newsquest), based in Glasgow, launched in 2014 following the 2014 independence referendum.

Sunday newspapers include the tabloid Sunday Mail (published by the Daily Record's parent company, Trinity Mirror) and the Sunday Post (D.C. Thomson & Co.), while the Sunday Herald and Scotland on Sunday have associations with The Herald and The Scotsman respectively.

National UK-wide newspapers such as The Times, The Daily Telegraph, Daily Express, Daily Mail, Daily Star, Daily Mirror & The Sun publish Scottish editions of their paper.

Regional dailies include The Courier in Dundee and the east, and The Press and Journal serving Aberdeen and the north.

=== Magazines ===
There are over 700 magazines published in Scotland, by nearly 200 organisations, with an estimated total turnover of £157m per annum.

=== Awards ===
Print publications and journalists in Scotland are recognised for their quality at the Scottish Press Awards. Additionally, film and television production is celebrated during the annual BAFTA Scotland ceremony. Individuals within the media industry may also be recognised at events such as the Spirit of Scotland Awards, with distinct categories relating to Scottish media including Music, Screen and Writing awards. Past recipients in these categories at the Spirit of Scotland Awards include James McAvoy (screen), Paolo Nutini (music) and Sally Magnusson (writing).

Scottish music is typically celebrated at ceremonies such as the Scottish Music Awards, Scots Trad Music Awards, Scottish Album of the Year Award and the Scottish Alternative Music Awards. Other distinct awards celebrated in Scotland to honour work within the field of media include BBC Radio Scotland Young Traditional Musician, BAFTA Scotland New Talent Awards and Scotland's National Book Awards.

== Film ==
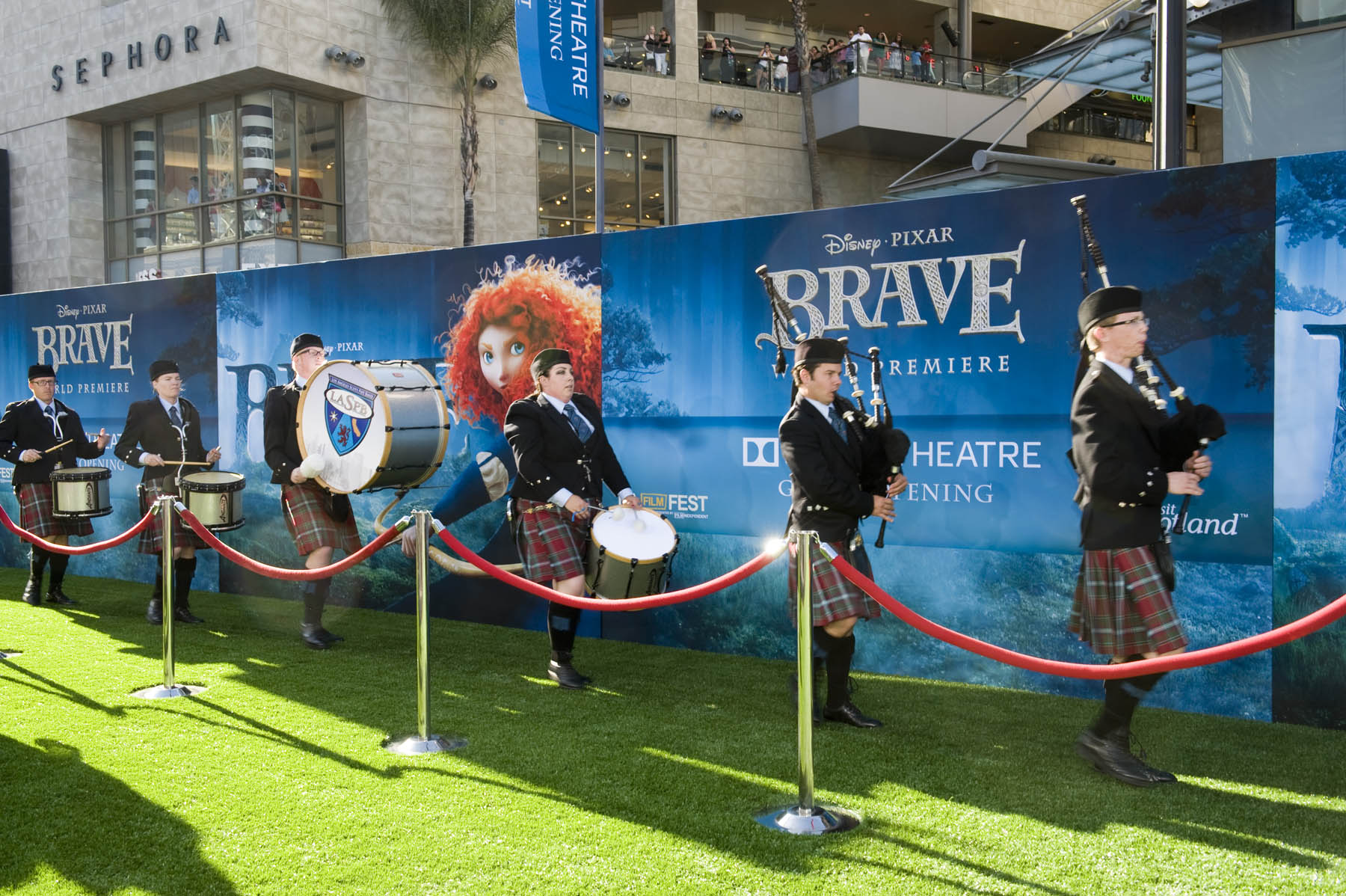
Pipers at the premiere of Brave, a Pixar film set in Scotland during the medieval ages

Scotland has produced many award winning and high-grossing films produced and filmed in the country, such as Trainspotting, Shallow Grave, Braveheart, Local Hero, Gregory's Girl, Outlaw King, and Red Road. It has also produced many award winning actors, directors and producers, such as Billy Connolly, Craig Ferguson, David Tennant, Ewan McGregor, Kelly Macdonald, Kate Dickie, Martin Compston, Sean Connery, Karen Gillan, Peter Capaldi, Robert Carlyle and Lewis MacDougall to name a few.

Scotland has played set to a number of high grossing movies and film franchises, with a number of James Bond films being set there including; Casino Royale (1967), The World Is Not Enough (1999) and Skyfall (2012). The majority of the Harry Potter films were set in Scotland, with Hogwarts said to be based on the University of Glasgow. Other major and notable films set in Scotland include The Water Horse: Legend of the Deep, Sweet Sixteen, Victoria & Abdul, The Young Victoria, The Wicker Man, Brave, A Castle for Christmas, The Da Vinci Code, The Day After Tomorrow, Fantastic Beasts: The Crimes of Grindelwald, Fantastic Beasts: The Secrets of Dumbledore, The King's Speech, The Last King of Scotland, Highlander and The Queen.

BAFTA Scotland recognises and awards Scottish talent in film annually.

== Television series ==
Scotland produces a number of television shows and series, mostly soap operas and sitcoms. Notable soap operas include Take the High Road (1980–2003) and River City (2002–present). Popular sitcoms to have been filmed, set and produced in Scotland include Still Game (2002–2007; 2016–2019), Rab C. Nesbitt (1988–1999, 2008–2014), Burnistoun (2009–2019), Two Doors Down (2013–present), Chewin' the Fat (1999–2005), Gary: Tank Commander (2009–2012) and Scot Squad (2014–2023). The 2024 BBC drama Nightsleeper was filmed and set primarily in Scotland.

Other notable television series filmed in Scotland include Dinosaur (2024–present), Life of Riley (2009–2011), City Lights (1984–1991) and Monarch of the Glen (2000–2005). Although not set in Scotland, the BBC comedy series Mrs Brown's Boys (2011–present) is filmed at BBC Pacific Quay studios in Glasgow, as was its spin–off series All Round to Mrs. Brown's (2017–2020). A variety of critically acclaimed television series have been filmed and set in Scotland including Outlander, Katie Morag, Shetland, Taggart, Vigil and Waterloo Road.

As well as recognising and celebrating achievement in Scottish film and video games, BAFTA Scotland also recognises Scottish talent in television and broadcasting annually.

== Online ==
Television broadcasters BBC Scotland, STV, ITV and most newspapers in Scotland (like The Herald and The Scotsman) also provide online content and blogs.

Other notable Scottish online news and commentary sites include: Bella Caledonia, and The Ferret.

Dàna is the only Scottish Gaelic news source independent of the BBC at present; it is an online magazine.

== See also ==
- Media in Scotland
- Gaelic broadcasting in Scotland
- Scottish Broadcasting Commission
- List of Scotland-based production companies
