= Barbara Quaile =

Scottish nurse and midwife (1906–1999)

Barbara Quaile OBE
- Born: 28 March 1906; Edinburgh, Scotland
- Died: 15 February 1999 (aged 92); Glasgow
- Occupations: Nurse, Matron
- Spouse: Kenneth Quaile (m. 1958; died 1975)
- Honours: OBE

Ida Barbara Helen Quaile OBE (née Renton 28 March 1906 – 15 February 1999) was a Scottish nurse, midwife, Matron of Glasgow Victoria Infirmary and Lady Superintendent of Royal Infirmary of Edinburgh.

== Early life and training ==
Quaile was born in Edinburgh on 28 March 1906, the second child of Ida Sandeman, of the Sandeman port and wine family, and David Renton, a solicitor. She was educated at St Trinnean's School for Girls in Edinburgh where she was Head Girl. In 1927 she began four years of nursing training at Edinburgh's Royal Infirmary and was admitted to the Royal College of Nursing in 1932. A believer in continuing education she went on to gain a Diploma in Nursing from the University of London in 1936, received the Central Midwives' Board for Scotland midwife teachers' qualification in 1939, and in 1946, was registered as a Sister Tutor by the General Nursing Council for Scotland.

== Career ==
After qualifying as a nurse, she went to work at the Kent and Canterbury Hospital before returning to Scotland to take up the position of assistant matron at the Simpson Memorial Maternity Pavilion in Edinburgh. In 1940 she moved to work at the 2,000-bed emergency war hospital, Bangor Hospital near Livingston. She was appointed matron at the hospital, making her, at that time, the youngest woman in Scotland to hold such a position. In 1946, she was appointed matron of Glasgow Royal Infirmary, remaining there until 1955, after which she took up the position of lady superintendent of the Royal Infirmary of Edinburgh.

In the hospitals that Quaile oversaw, she implemented changes and efficiencies, including portering services to transport patients to and from wards rather than using nursing staff, actively encouraging the employment of male nurses, advocating for senior staff to live out from the hospital, and seeking improvements to nursing accommodation. Considered a strict disciplinarian with high standard, she was respected by both staff and patients.

In 1958 she received an OBE for services to nursing.

== Professional activities ==
Quaile held several professional positions during her career and after her retirement. She was a member of the General Nursing Council for Scotland, and Secretary, and later President, of the Association of Scottish Hospital Matrons, representing the Association at the Coronation of Queen Elizabeth II. She served on the Scottish Board of the Royal College of Nursing and from 1944 to 1948 was a member of the Board's Reconstruction Committee which examined the future of nursing after the Second World War. She was a member of the Western Region Hospitals Board and helped establish the Marie Curie Centre at Hunters Hill, chairing its house committee. From 1961 to 1968 she was president of Bearsden Red Cross, from 1968 to 1971 chair of the board of governors of Queens College, and a director of Balmanno Homes adult care centres.

== Personal life ==
Her interests included painting and music.

She retired in 1958 to marry Kenneth McEwan Quaile, a widower and stockbroker from Glasgow.

Quaile died in Glasgow on 15 February 1999, aged 92.
