= Strathbungo Parish Church =

Church building in Glasgow, Scotland

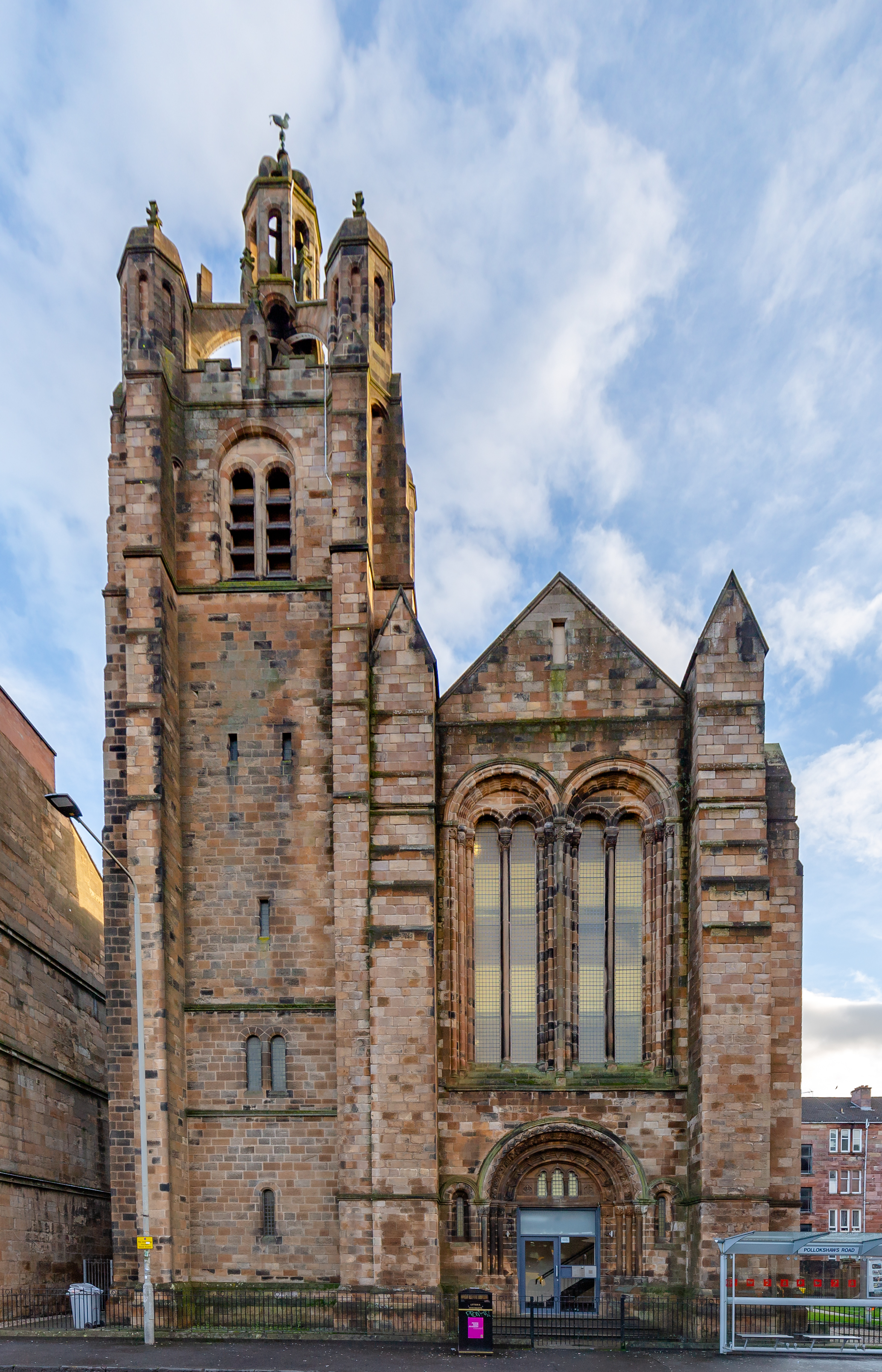
- Interactive map of the Strathbungo Parish Church area

General information
- Status: Residential Flats
- Architectural style: Romanesque and Scots Gothic style (facade and steeple)
- Location: 605, Pollokshaws Rd, Glasgow, Scotland
- Coordinates: 55°50′16″N 4°16′06″W
- Groundbreaking: October 1887 (church); 2005 (flats)

Design and construction
- Architect: John McKissack

Listed Building – Category B
- Designated: 15 December 1970
- Reference no.: LB32397

Strathbungo Parish Church was a 19th-century Church of Scotland building located in the Strathbungo area of Glasgow. The church body was demolished and converted into flats in 2006, but retained the original facade and bell tower of the former church.

== Original Church ==
Strathbungo, like most of the south and west side of Glasgow was part of Govan Parish. In 1833, it was decided that a new mission be established in Strathbungo. Consequently, plans were made for a church to be built, which was eventually built between 1839 and 1840 on designs by Charles Wilson, with a total cost of £1300. The Reverend Alexander Sutherland became the first minister of the church in 1848.

== Second Church ==
Strathbungo became an independent parish from the Govan Parish on 13 January 1879. Consequently, a new church was planned by 1883. Designs by J Ritchie were favoured and won the competition, but the designs by John McKissack of McKissack & Rowan were accepted and used instead. The foundation stone for the new church, built on the site of the old church, was laid in October 1887 Sir John Neil Cuthbertson. Most of the stone of the old church were reused in the new building, which opened on 7 October 1888. It was built in a Romanesque and Scots Gothic style, with a Crown steeple.

A WWI memorial was installed in the church remembering the parishioners who died during the war, and which today is located in Queen's Park Govanhill Parish Church.

== Closure ==
By the 1970s, the congregation had dwindled and it was decided to close Strathbungo Parish Church and unite the congregation with Queen's Park West. The church closed in May 1979 and was eventually sold. However, it became derelict by time, at the point of destruction. The body of the church building, including the church halls, were demolished. In 2005 Southside Housing Association, who had purchased the site, built a number of residential flats in its stead, while retaining the church facade and steeple. the building was completed by May 2006.
