= Govanhill Trinity Church =

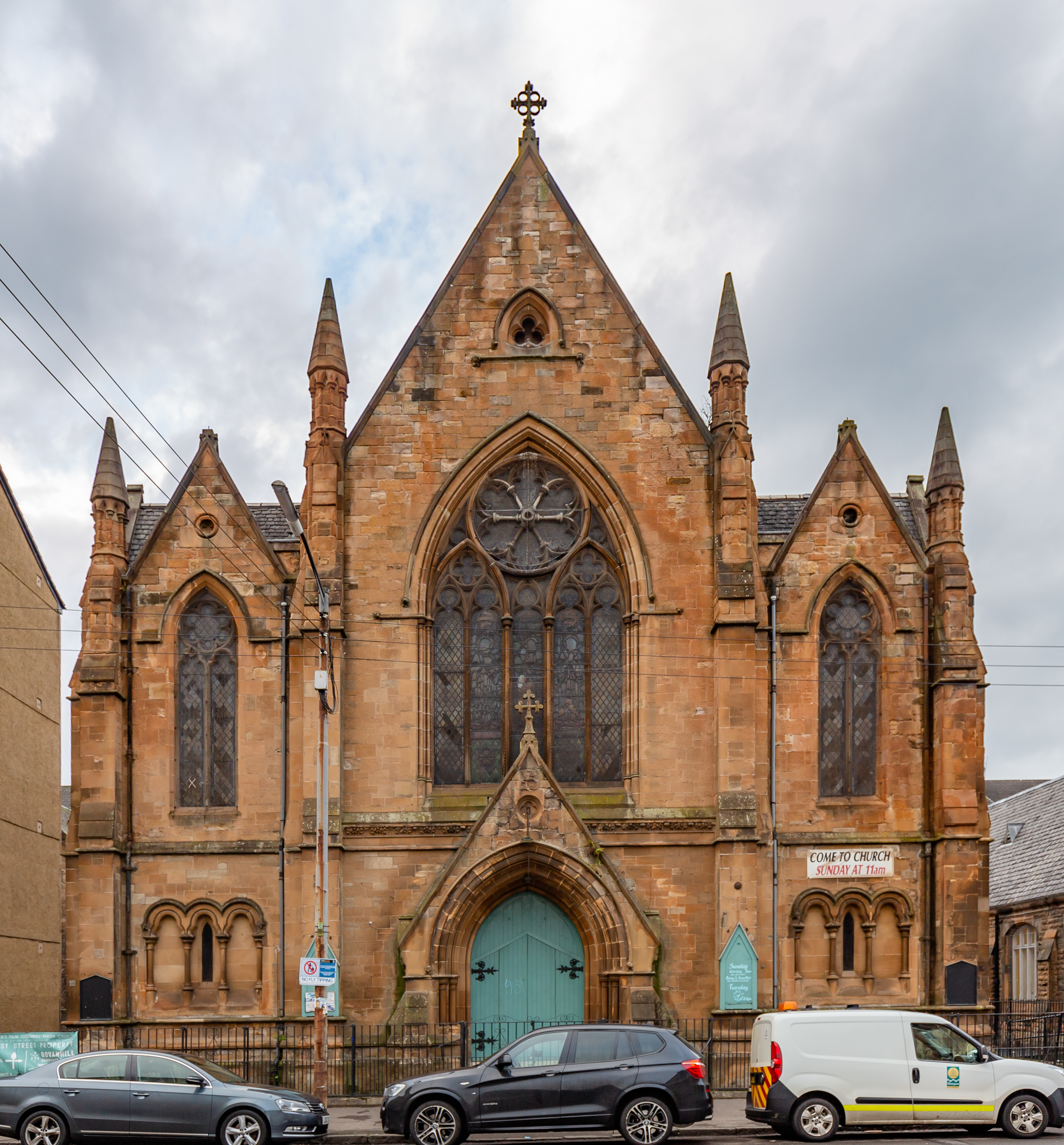
- The church in 2018.
- Govanhill Trinity Church
- 55°50′10″N 4°15′31″W
- Location: Glasgow
- Country: Scotland
- Denomination: Church of Scotland

History
- Former name(s): Govanhill United Presbyterian Church; Govanhill Parish Church
- Status: Closed
- Founded: 1878

Architecture
- Functional status: Community Centre
- Architect: Robert Baldie
- Architectural type: Church
- Style: Neo-Gothic
- Years built: 1878–1880
- Groundbreaking: 1878
- Completed: 1880

Listed Building – Category B
- Designated: 5 December 1989
- Reference no.: LB32430

Govanhill Trinity Church is a 19th-century church building in the Govanhill area of Glasgow. The church closed down in 2015, but it is still owned by the Church of Scotland.

== History ==
The church building was founded as the Govanhill United Presbyterian Church. It was built between 1878 and 1880 in a geometric Neo-Gothic style designed by Robert Baldie. The church included a nave and gable-fronted Aisles. An organ by Abbott and Smith was installed in 1912.

Upon union with the Church of Scotland in 1929, the church was renamed Govanhill West Church, to distinguish it from Govanhill South Church. Both congregations united in 1952 to form Govanhill Parish Church using the church building in Daisy Street. In 1989, the congregation of the now demolished Candlish Polmadie Church (formerly Candlish Memorial Church), united with the Govanhill congregation forming Govanhill Trinity Parish Church. The Reverend Tomas Bisek, a Czech clergyman ordained in the Evangelical Church of Czech Brethren, became the first minister of Govanhill Trinity.

In January 2014, the Presbytery of Glasgow approved a two-year guardianship relationship between Govanhill Trinity and Queen's Park entered into a two-year guardianship relationship. The guardianship proposed that upon the end of December 2015, the two congregations would unite and worship would continue at the Queen's Park Church building. This came into being in 2015, when Queen's Park Govanhill Parish was formed. Since 2015, the former Govanhill Trinity Church building has been used as a community centre and canteen operated by the Church of Scotland.
