= John Ormiston =

Scottish footballer

Personal information
- Full name: John James Ormiston
- Date of birth: 9 November 1880
- Place of birth: Glasgow, Scotland
- Date of death: 1 March 1917 (aged 36)
- Place of death: Vimy Ridge, France
- Position: Right half

Senior career*
Years	Team	Apps	(Gls)
1900–1908	Queen's Park	17	(0)
- * Club domestic league appearances and goals

John James Ormiston (9 November 1880 – 1 March 1917) was a Scottish amateur footballer who played in the Scottish League for Queen's Park as a right half.

== Personal life ==
Ormiston was educated at Queen's Park Secondary School and the Royal College of Science and Technology and later worked as an analytical chemist. He emigrated to Canada prior to 1911 and after the outbreak of the First World War in 1914, he enlisted in the 75th Battalion (Mississauga), CEF under the assumed name "John Armstrong". Ormiston was killed on Vimy Ridge on 1 March 1917 and was buried in Villers Station Cemetery, Villers-au-Bois.

== Career statistics ==
Appearances and goals by club, season and competition
Club	Season	League			Scottish Cup		Other		Total	
Club	Season	Division	Apps	Goals	Apps	Goals	Apps	Goals	Apps	Goals
Queen's Park	1899–1900	Inter City League	3	0	0	0	0	0	3	0
Queen's Park	1900–01	Scottish First Division	7	0	0	0	1 (Note: Appearance in Glasgow Merchants Charity Cup)	0	8	0
Queen's Park	1901–02	Scottish First Division	4	0	0	0	3 (Note: 2 appearances in Glasgow Cup, 1 appearance in Glasgow International Exhibition Cup)	0	7	0
Queen's Park	1902–03	Scottish First Division	3	0	0	0	0	0	3	0
Career total			17	0	0	0	4	0	21	0
