= RISC (disambiguation) =

RISC is an abbreviation for reduced instruction set computer.

RISC or Risc may also refer to:

== Computing ==
- Berkeley RISC
- Classic RISC pipeline, a component of early RISC aicrorchitectures
- CompactRISC, National Semiconductor family of RISC architectures
- MIPS RISC/os, a discontinued UNIX operating system developed by MIPS Computer Systems
- OpenRISC, a project to develop a series of open-source hardware
- PA-RISC, an instruction set architecture developed by Hewlett-Packard
- Research Institute for Symbolic Computation in Linz, Austria
- RISC iX, discontinued UNIX operating system
- RISC OS, operating system created by Acorn Computers
- RISC OS character set, used in the Acorn Archimedes
- History of RISC OS, Acorn Computers OS history
- RISC OS Open Ltd., (ROOL) a company engaged in computer software and IT consulting
- Risc PC, Acorn computer launched in 1994
- RISC-V, an open-source instruction set architecture

== Other ==
- RNA-induced silencing complex, a multiprotein complex involved in gene silencing
- Rockwell Integrated Sciences Center, a building on the campus of Lafayette College.

== See also ==
- Risk (disambiguation)
