= Camphill Queen's Park Baptist Church =

Camphill Queen's Park
- Camphill Queen's Park Baptist Church
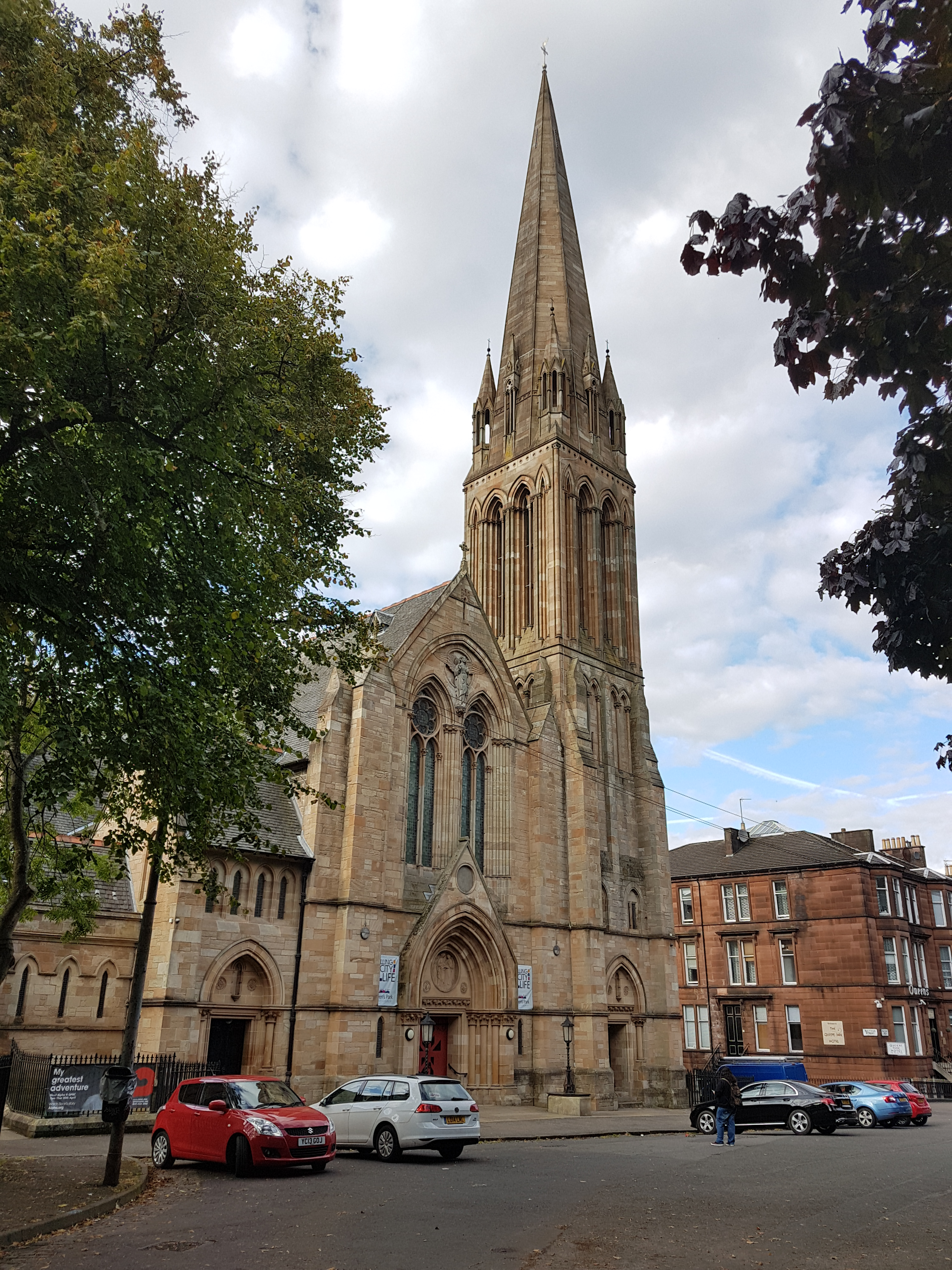
- The church in 2017
- Camphill Queen's Park
- 55°50′02″N 4°16′15″W
- Location: Glasgow
- Country: Scotland
- Denomination: Baptist Church
- Previous denomination: Church of Scotland
- Website: Church Website

History
- Status: Active
- Founded: 1872

Architecture
- Functional status: Parish church
- Architect: William Leiper
- Architectural type: Church
- Style: French Gothic
- Years built: 1872–1876
- Completed: 8 October 1876

Clergy
- Pastor(s): Brodie McGregor; Iain Macaulay; Mairi Greenshields

Listed Building – Category A
- Designated: 15 December 1970
- Reference no.: LB32359

Camphill Queen's Park Baptist Church is a 19th-century church building in the south-side of Glasgow, immediately opposite Queen's Park.

It was built in the French Gothic style, on designs by William Leiper. The church hall was built in 1873, while the church was completed by 8 October 1876. The octagonal church spire was completed in 1883.

== History ==
The church was founded by members of the Queen's Park United Presbyterian Church (destroyed during WWII) of Langside Avenue, as the Camphill United Presbyterian Church. The Campill church was built to serve as a parish church of the United Presbyterian Church.

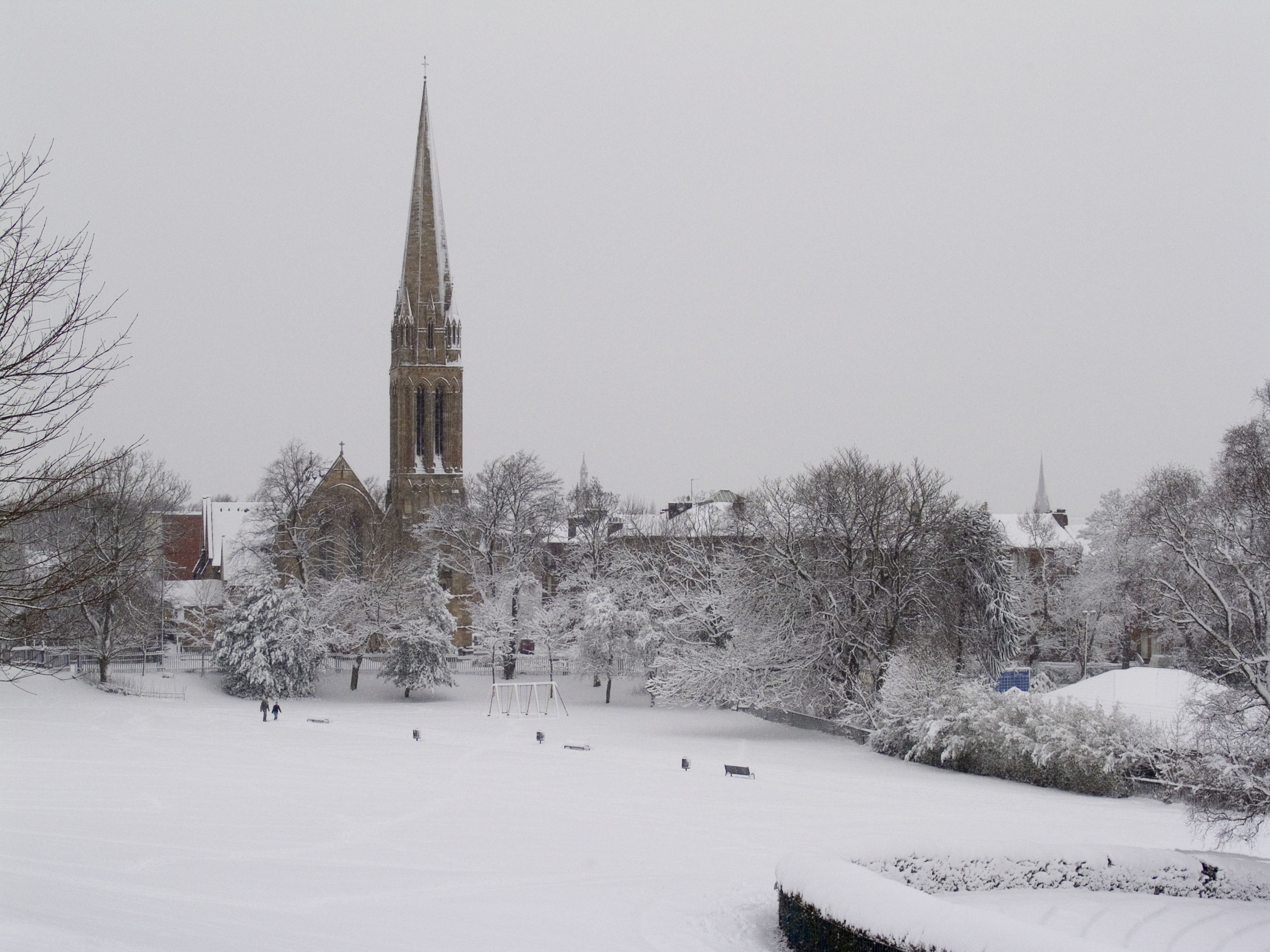
The church as seen from Queen's Park.

Upon the union with the United Presbyterian Church and the Free Church of Scotland in 1900, the church became known as Camphill United Free Church. In 1929, when the United Free Church of Scotland united with the Church of Scotland, the church was renamed Camphill Queen's Park Church.

In 1983, the Presbytery of Glasgow formed a Basis of Association, an agreement between Strathbungo Queen's Park and Camphill Queen's Park, that upon the retirement or resignation of either church minister, the Strathbungo Queen's Park building would close and the congregation would unite with the Camphill parish and use the Camphill building as the parish church.

However, the agreement was amended in October 1990, deciding in favour of retaining the Strathbungo Queen's Park building instead of the Camphill building. Consequently, Camphill Queen's Park Church closed in the 1990s and was eventually sold to the Baptist Church, who already possessed Queen's Park Baptist Church in Queen's Drive.
