= Ralph Risk =

Scottish footballer

Personal information
- Full name: Ralph Risk
- Date of birth: 28 July 1891
- Place of birth: Cathcart, Scotland
- Date of death: 24 May 1961 (aged 69)
- Place of death: Edinburgh, Scotland
- Position: Outside forward

Senior career*
Years	Team	Apps	(Gls)
1913–1914	Queen's Park	17	(0)
- * Club domestic league appearances and goals

Ralph Risk CBE, MC and Bar (28 July 1891 – 24 May 1961) was a Scottish solicitor, lawyer and president of the Law Society of Scotland. He also briefly played as an outside forward in the Scottish League for Queen's Park and was later the president of the club between 1935 and 1938.

== Personal life ==
Risk was educated at Queen's Park School and Mount Florida School in Glasgow and later studied law at Glasgow University, eventually becoming a solicitor. He was married with three sons and two daughters and his elder brother Charles also played football for Queen's Park. Risk was a member of the General Council of Solicitors in Scotland between 1933 and 1939, a senior partner in Maclay Murray & Spens and president of the Law Society of Scotland. He died in hospital in Edinburgh in 1961.

== War service ==
In June 1915, nearly a year after Britain's entry into the First World War, Risk received his commission as a second lieutenant in the Gordon Highlanders. He won an MC and Bar, for "conspicuous gallantry and devotion to duty" in actions at Rœux Chemical Works during the Battle of Arras in spring 1917 and during the Battle of the Scarpe in August 1918. Risk rose to the rank of captain during the course of his war service, having been promoted to lieutenant in July 1917 and to captain in April 1918. He left his battalion on special leave to Britain on 25 September 1918 and would see no further action before the Armistice.

Risk served with the Royal Air Force during the Second World War and established the barrage balloon defence of Scapa Flow in 1939. He later rose to the rank of wing commander and was superintendent of balloon development at RAF Cardington.

== Career statistics ==
Appearances and goals by club, season and competition
Club	Season	League			Scottish Cup		Other		Total	
Club	Season	Division	Apps	Goals	Apps	Goals	Apps	Goals	Apps	Goals
Queen's Park	1912–13	Scottish First Division	3	0	1	0	1 (Note: Appearance in Glasgow Merchants Charity Cup)	0	5	0
Queen's Park	1913–14	Scottish First Division	2	0	0	0	0	0	2	0
Queen's Park	1914–15	Scottish First Division	12	0	0	0	2 (Note: Appearances in Glasgow Cup)	0	14	0
Career total			17	0	1	0	3	0	21	0
