= Queen's Park, Glasgow =

Park in Glasgow, Scotland

Queen's Park
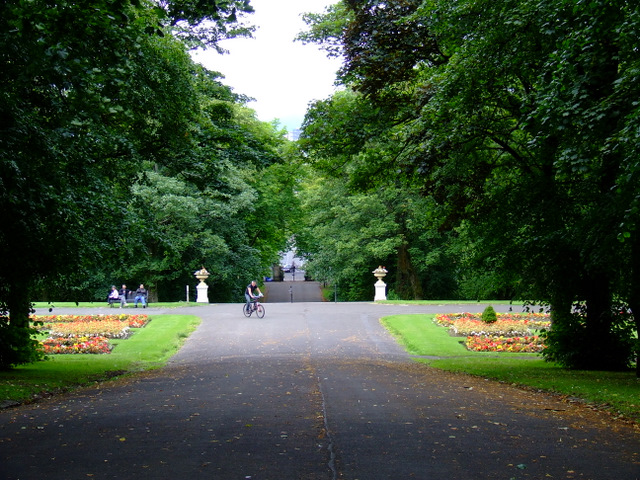
- Interactive map of Queen's Park
- Type: Public park
- Location: Glasgow, Scotland
- Coordinates: 55.830433°N 4.267759°W
- Area: 60 hectares (148 acres)
- Operator: Glasgow City Council
- Open: Open all year
- Public transit: Queens Park railway station

Queen's Park (Scottish Gaelic: Pàirc na Banrìghinn, Scots: Queen's Pairk) is a park situated on the south side of the city of Glasgow, Scotland, between Strathbungo, Shawlands, Battlefield, Mount Florida, and Crosshill. The 60-hectare (148-acre) park lies about 2 1/2 miles (4 km) south of the city centre, and gives its name to a nearby railway station and several other local businesses and institutions, including the football team Queen's Park FC.

== History ==
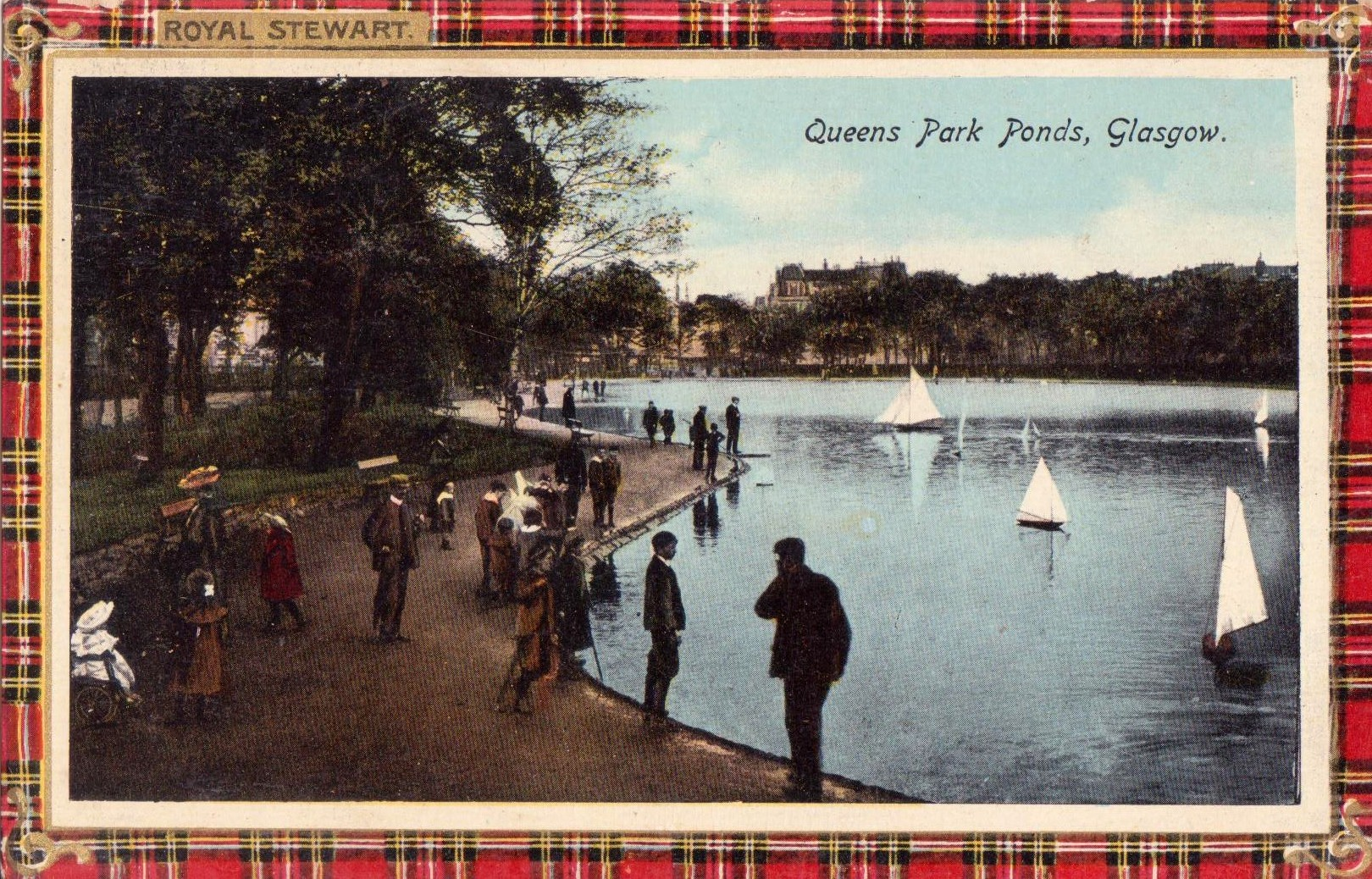
Queen's Park Ponds, c. 1910.

The lands of the park were part of the lands of Langside, belonging to the Maxwells of Pollok. During the 17th Century, the western part was sold to form Camphill Farm. This was sold again in 1799 to Glasgow manufacturer Robert Thomson who built Camphill House, which still stands at the edge of the park grounds. His son purchased the adjacent Pathhead Farm in 1834, and the merged land was sold by grandson Neale Thomson to Glasgow Corporation in 1857 for the purpose of developing Glasgow's third park.

The park was developed in the late 19th century in response to the increasing population density of Glasgow in general, and the South Side in particular, with the growth of tenement housing supplying the increased demand for middle-class homes. Victorian Glasgow took the provision of open spaces extremely seriously, with the result that parks such as Queen's Park sprang up across the city. It is surrounded by several residential city districts, mostly consisting primarily of tenements, namely Battlefield, Crosshill, Crossmyloof, Govanhill, Langside, Shawlands and Strathbungo. The buildings of the Glasgow Victoria Infirmary hospital (both the 19th and 21st century facilities) are also nearby.

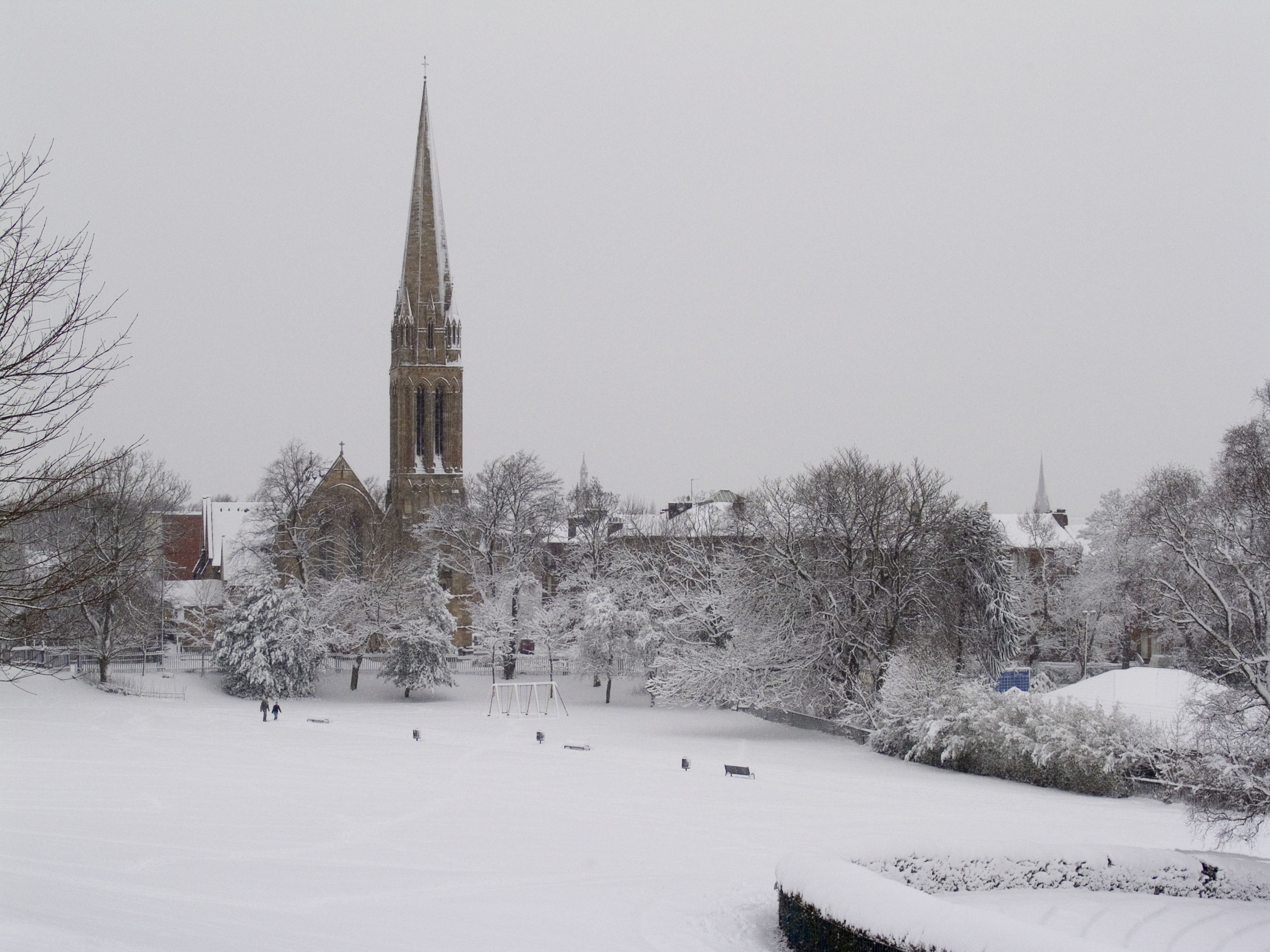
Queen's Park in winter, looking towards Queen's Park Baptist Church.

The park was designed by Sir Joseph Paxton, also responsible for noted public parks in London, Liverpool, Birkenhead and the grounds of the Spa Buildings at Scarborough. The original plans for the park included a winter garden and an artificial loch, but these were considered too extravagant and were removed in amended plans developed by the city architect, John Carrick. The park was dedicated to the memory of Mary, Queen of Scots - Mary lost the Battle of Langside near the park, and the park given its present name in place of the original 'South Side Park'.

In 2008 local resident Moira Jones was abducted outside her home and killed in the park, and this crime and the hunt for the killer were given considerable media coverage In 2014, several thousand women marched through the park and surrounding streets at night to highlight and protest against several sexual assaults which had occurred in the area over the preceding months during hours of darkness. However, further rare but serious incidents of a similar nature occurred following that event.

== Current usage ==
Today the park is used by many thousands of people annually, and remains a focal point for the people of the South Side of Glasgow and beyond. The park holds the regular farmers markets and a wide range of family events, many of these in the redeveloped bandstand which is now known as Queen's Park Arena. The park also contains a wide range of leisure and sports areas and facilities. Since 2019, 'Queen's Parkrun', a weekly free 5 km event, has taken place in the park every Saturday morning at 9.30am.

There are three lawn bowls clubs, a tennis centre, a five-a-side football facility and a pitch and putt course within the park, as well as Camphill House (a former mansion built 1806, now private apartments), and Langside Hall, a former bank office which was originally in Glasgow city centre before being moved to its current location in 1889; it is now a community centre. Both buildings are Category A listed.

In 1895, the council built a plant nursery, including an extensive complex of glasshouses which latterly contained displays of exotic plants, fish, insects and reptiles which were open to the public. By the 21st century, this was being run in conjunction with Scotland's Rural College (SRUC) to teach horticultural students but structural issues in the buildings caused a partial closure of the glasshouses in 2017. Along with the planned withdrawal of SRUC in summer 2026, the future of the facility and continued public access looks increasingly uncertain. The council also leases allotments located between the glasshouses/nursery and the flagpole - these are managed on behalf of the Council by Queen's Park Allotment Association.

The tennis courts are managed by Queens Park Community Tennis Club and Glasgow City Council who funded the refurbished tennis courts in 2015.

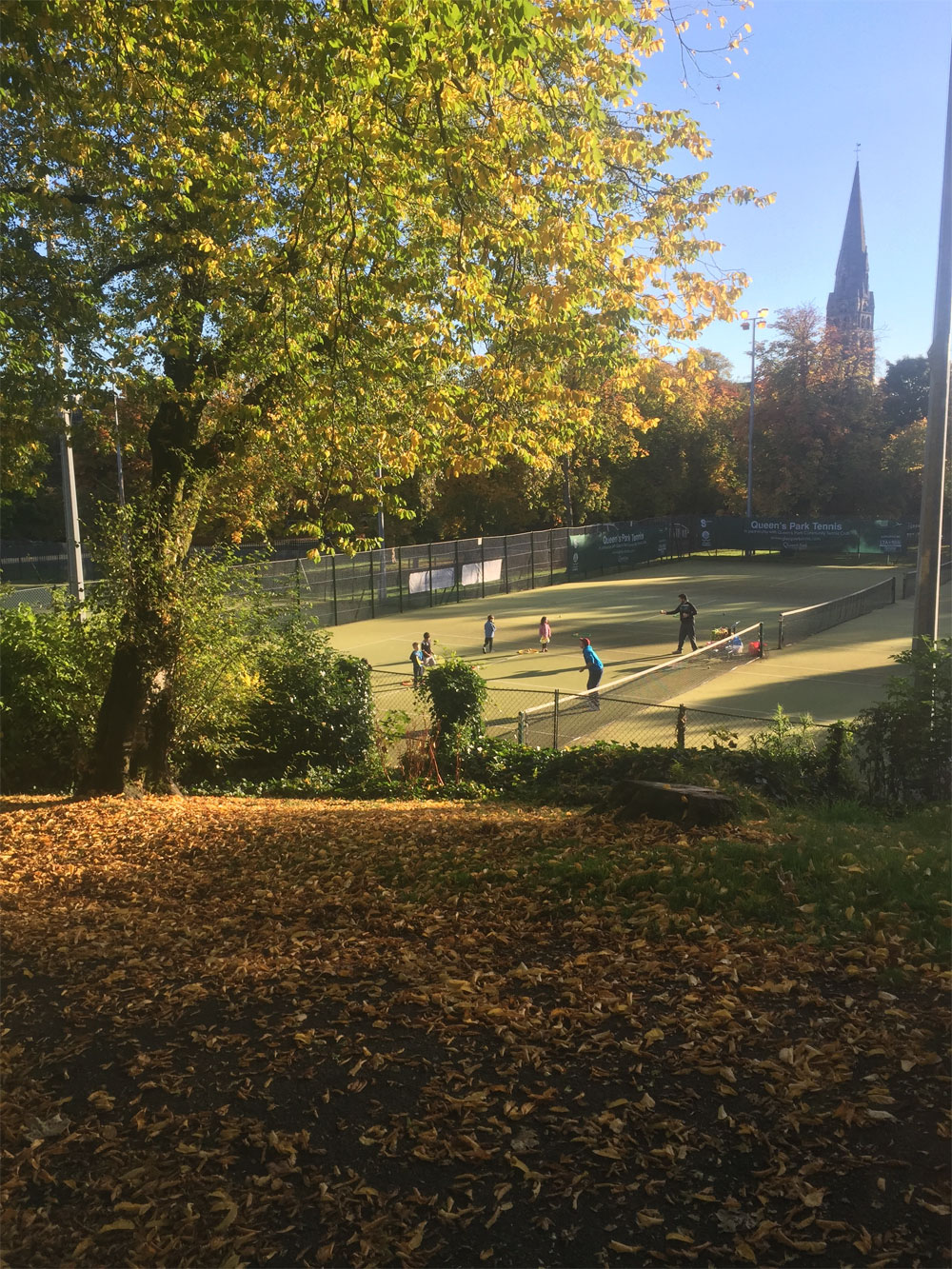
Tennis courts at Queens Park

The park is popular in snowy weather, when the public make use of the park's steep hills for sledging.

From various points of the park, it is possible to view the full expanse of Glasgow in a given direction. The most comprehensive viewpoint is marked by a flagpole, and affords views of tens of miles to the north, east and south. In good visibility this view encompasses the Campsie Fells. Although the current viewfinder indicates that Ben Lomond is visible, this is incorrect. What is actually visible are the twin summits of Stob Binnein and Ben More by Crianlarich. Ben Lomond is further west, and would be completely obscured behind the Kilpatrick Hills, if they themselves were not hidden behind nearby trees.

== Archaeology ==
An earthwork runs over the top of the hill in the park enclosing an area approximately 120 by 100 metres (390 by 330 ft). Excavations in 1951 revealed 14th century pottery. By comparison with similar archaeological sites in the area, it is suggested by Eric J Talbot, then of Glasgow University, that this was a Norman ringwork earth and timber castle.

== See also ==
- Glasgow Golf Club
