= Eklipse Sports Radio =

Scotland
- Broadcast area: Central Scotland
- Frequency: DAB: Central Scotland

Programming
- Format: Sport, Classic rock

Ownership
- Owner: Eklipse Sports Radio Ltd

History
- First air date: 5 May 2014
- Last air date: 29 February 2016

Links
- Website: Listen live

Eklipse Sports Radio was a Scottish-owned independent local radio station. It was based in Kinning Park on the Southside of Glasgow and broadcast to Fife, and Central Scotland. All programming was produced in Glasgow.

The station ceased broadcasting on 29 February 2016 after the owners withdrew their financial support.

== History ==
The station was mooted in the Summer of 2013 when capacity became available on the Central Scotland multiplex and a five-year transmission contract was signed with Switch Scotland. The station's OFCOM broadcast licence was granted in July 2013 with a licensed format of sports news, talk and Classic rock music to a potential 2.7 million adults in the station's total survey area (TSA). The founding Station Director was Spencer Pryor, and aimed to raise £40,000 in capital through the UK government's Seed Enterprise Investment Scheme. In October, Eklipse Sports Radio hired former Bill Young as station controller, who had previously worked with talkSport and Real Radio Scotland.

In February 2014 the station moved into new studio premises in Admiral St in the Kinning Park area of Glasgow. Eklipse Sports Radio launched their first schedule in April 2014, alongside the rights to cover Scottish Junior Football for the 2014/15 season including commentaries and match reports. The station launched at 7am on 5 May 2014, with DJ Chris Kane the opening presenter. The station also broadcast coverage from the 2014 Commonwealth Games and the 2014 World Matchplay darts in Blackpool.

By late 2014, Pryor sold his shareholding to a consortium of investors including the owners of Hamilton Academical FC. Pryor remained with the station, under new CEO Keira McDougall. However, he would resign in January 2015 just days before the relaunch. In figures reported by RAJAR in August 2015, across Q2 Eklipse Sports Radio (now named RockSport) had a weekly audience of just 7,000 listeners.

== Presenters and programming ==
At the time of its closure, presenters included George Aitchison, a former Qfm and Your Radio presenter on Breakfast. Bill Young the former Programme Controller at Belfast's CityBeat hosted the station's flagship phone-in programme along with co-hosts ex Rangers, Heart of Midlothian and Ayr United defender Hugh Burns on Mondays, Thursdays and Fridays. The other regular co-hosts were Ally Graham former Falkirk and Raith Rovers striker was also a regular pundit.

=== Programming ===
The main programming at closure included:

- George Aitchison (Weekday breakfast)
- Ian Martin (Weekday mid-mornings)
- Alex Horsburgh (Weekday afternoons)
- Bill Young (Weekday football phone-in)
- Stephen Quinn (Weekday Evenings)
- Dave Mac (Weekend Breakfast)
- Ian Oliphant (Weekend mornings)
- Andy Alston (F1 Review Show)
- Andy Coyle (Sunday afternoon)

=== Former Presenters ===
- Nick Mills
- Peter Greenwood
- Catt Weir
- Steve Delahaye
- Chris Kane
- Rod Johnston
- Chris Duke
- Scott Summers
- Dave Knight
