= Talking Scotland =

Scottish social affairs television series

Talking Scotland Logo

Talking Scotland was a Scottish social affairs television series on STV and Grampian Television in Northern and Central Scotland. Each segment was one minute long.

The series was produced in conjunction with the Scottish Executive and broadcast each weekday at approximately 4:58 am, 3:58 pm and 6:28 pm, the programme also aired at 11:03 pm on Monday nights when Scotsport was on air.

The issues highlighted during Talking Scotland's run included:

- Alcohol
- Anti-Social Behaviour
- Better Renting
- Biodiversity
- Child Protection on the Internet
- Children's Hearings
- Children's Traffic Club
- Determined to Succeed
- Disability
- Domestic Abuse
- Drink Driving
- Drugs & Drug Driving
- E.coli 0157
- Family Support Groups (Drugs)
- Fire Safety
- Health Service
- Healthy Living
- Internet
- In-Car Safety
- Mental Health
- NHS24 & GP Out Of Hours
- Organ Donation
- The Pneumococcal Jab Race
- Smoking in Public Places
- Social Work/Care
- Speeding
- Tailgating
- Teacher Recruitment
- Teaching
- Travel Awareness
- Violence at Work
- Volunteering
- Waste Awareness
- Working in the NHS
- 20 mph Zones
