= Strathbungo =

Area of Glasgow, Scotland

Coordinates: 55.83654°N 4.27057°W

Strathbungo: Scottish Gaelic: Srath Mhungain
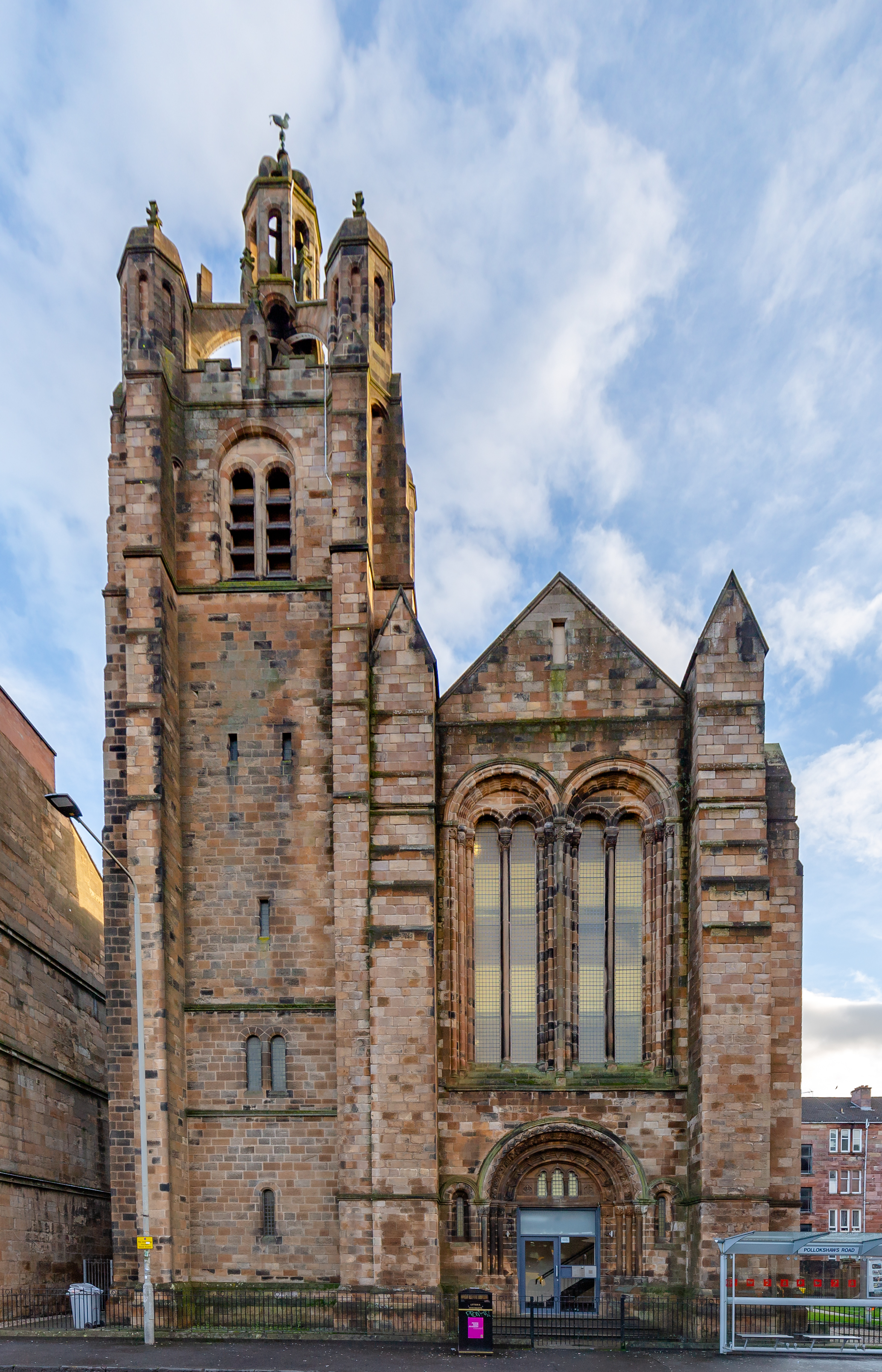
- Strathbungo Parish Church

- Location within Glasgow
- OS grid reference: NS579627
- Community council: Shawlands and Strathbungo
- Council area: Glasgow
- Lieutenancy area: Glasgow
- Country: Scotland
- Sovereign state: United Kingdom
- Post town: Glasgow
- Postcode district: G41, G42
- Dialling code: 0141
- Police: Scotland
- Fire: Scottish
- Ambulance: Scottish
- UK Parliament: Glasgow Central
- Scottish Parliament: Glasgow Southside

Strathbungo is a mainly residential area of southern Glasgow, Scotland, bordered by the neighbourhoods of Crossmyloof to the south, Govanhill to the east and Pollokshields to the north and west. The settlement grew up as a small isolated village built along the Pollokshaws Road, one of the main arteries leading southwards from the centre of Glasgow (today part of the A77 road), adjoined by the Camphill Estate, now part of Queens Park. Strathbungo lay just inside Govan parish, on its boundary with Cathcart parish, and at one time a line just north of Allison Street and Nithsdale Street formed the boundary or 'march' between the counties of Lanark and Renfrew.

The feudal superiors, the Maxwells of Pollok, preferred the name Marchtown. This name is seen on some old maps, and survives in March Street.

== Etymology ==
The words 'Strathbungo Cross' appear on a tenement at the corner of Allison Street and Pollokshaws Road, but no satisfactory explanation has ever been given for the name Strathbungo, as 'Strath' (from Scottish Gaelic: Srath) is normally a prefix for a wide river valley. However, there is no river Bungo. "Bungo" may represent a de-nasalisation of Mungo, the patron saint of Glasgow, from Srath Mhungain.

== Development ==
Strathbungo developed as a crofters and miners village in the early 18th century. By the end of that century, over 35 families were living in the village and weaving had become the principal occupation.

1859 and 1860 are the dates of the feuing dispositions granted by Sir John Maxwell of Pollok to the builder John McIntyre and quarrier William Stevenson for the development of the new Strathbungo. 1-10 Moray Place was the first block to be built in the new Strathbungo, to the designs of Alexander "Greek" Thomson that set the path for Strathbungo to develop as a residential suburb of Glasgow, linked by the Glasgow, Barrhead and Neilston Direct Railway. Thomson lived in the house that he designed at No 1 Moray Place and died there in 1875. The other terraces, Regent Park Square, Queen Square and Princes Square (later renamed Marywood Square), were built from 1862 to 1884, to form a desirable residential suburb. These, along with Moray Place, were named after the protagonists in the Battle of Langside fought nearby. The architect Charles Rennie Mackintosh lived in Strathbungo in the 1890s, first at 6, then 15, Regent Park Square, until the time of his marriage. Strathbungo was later extended in 1928–9 to include the red sandstone terraces of Vennard, Thorncliffe and Carswell Gardens.

Strathbungo was designated a conservation area in 1973, although the Gardens were later removed and the area extended to include Nithsdale Street and Drive.

In Alexander Thomson's death notice published in the Glasgow Herald of 23 March 1875, his place of death is described as "1, Moray Place, Regent Park" with no reference to Strathbungo; the residential suburb was initially styled Regent Park, although the area was always more widely known as Strathbungo.

By the 1860s tenement buildings had started to appear, and the last of the original village buildings were lost in the 1890s. The village never achieved burgh status and was annexed to Glasgow in 1891.

Strathbungo railway station opened on 1 December 1877, and closed on 28 May 1962.

== Conservation ==
The Strathbungo Society helps promote the preservation of the Strathbungo Conservation Area and organises events for local people like 'Bungo at the Bells' at the New Year and the 'Bungo in the Back Lanes' event in June each year. The latter was originally set up to help get people into the lanes in Strathbungo and to highlight the need for their refurbishment.
