= Charles Risk (footballer) =

Scottish footballer (1884–1949)

Personal information
- Full name: Charles David Risk
- Date of birth: 22 June 1884
- Place of birth: Cathcart, Scotland
- Date of death: 9 June 1949 (aged 64)
- Place of death: Vancouver, British Columbia, Canada
- Position: Outside forward

Senior career*
Years	Team	Apps	(Gls)
1908–1909	Queen's Park	8	(1)
- * Club domestic league appearances and goals

Charles David Risk (22 June 1884 – 9 June 1949) was a Scottish amateur footballer who played as an outside forward in the Scottish League for Queen's Park.

== Personal life ==
Risk was the elder brother of footballer and lawyer Ralph Risk. He emigrated to Canada in 1910 and died in Vancouver in 1949.

== Career statistics ==
Appearances and goals by club, season and competition
Club	Season	League			Scottish Cup		Total	
Club	Season	Division	Apps	Goals	Apps	Goals	Apps	Goals
Queen's Park	1908–09	Scottish First Division	8	0	0	0	8	0
Career total			8	0	0	0	8	0
