= Battlefield, Glasgow =

District in the Scottish city of Glasgow

Coordinates: 55.8249°N 4.2699°W

Battlefield: Scots: Battilfield
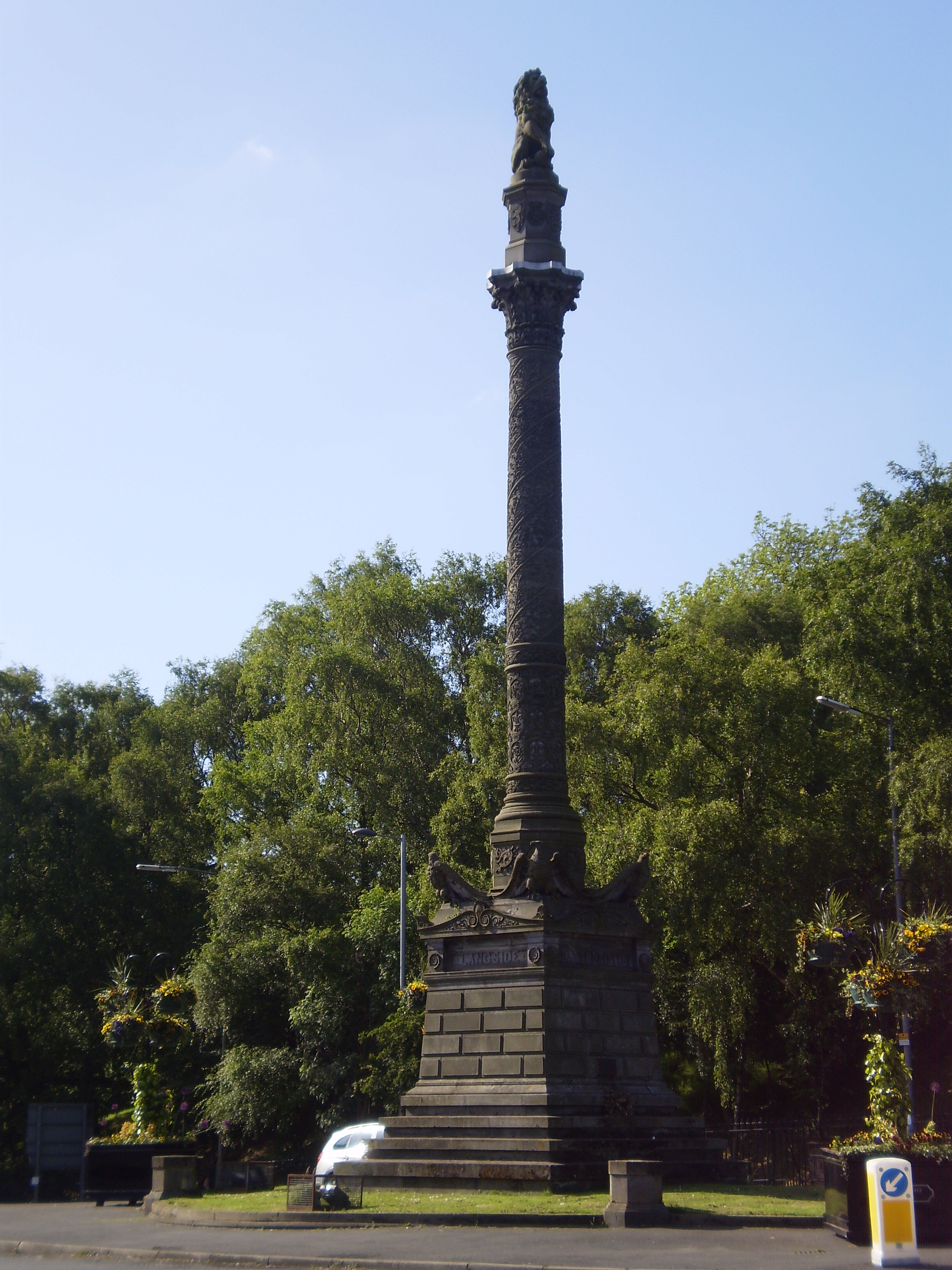
- Battlefield Monument, Glasgow

- Location within Glasgow
- OS grid reference: NS579614
- Council area: Glasgow City Council
- Lieutenancy area: Glasgow
- Country: Scotland
- Sovereign state: United Kingdom
- Post town: GLASGOW
- Postcode district: G42
- Dialling code: 0141
- Police: Scotland
- Fire: Scottish
- Ambulance: Scottish
- UK Parliament: Glasgow South
- Scottish Parliament: Glasgow Cathcart

Battlefield is a district in the Scottish city of Glasgow. It is situated south of the River Clyde. The area takes its name from the Battle of Langside of 1568 in which Mary, Queen of Scots' army was defeated by forces acting in the name of her infant son, James VI. A highly decorative monument, designed by Alexander Skirving in 1887, now stands adjacent to Queen's Park commemorating the 320th anniversary of her defeat.

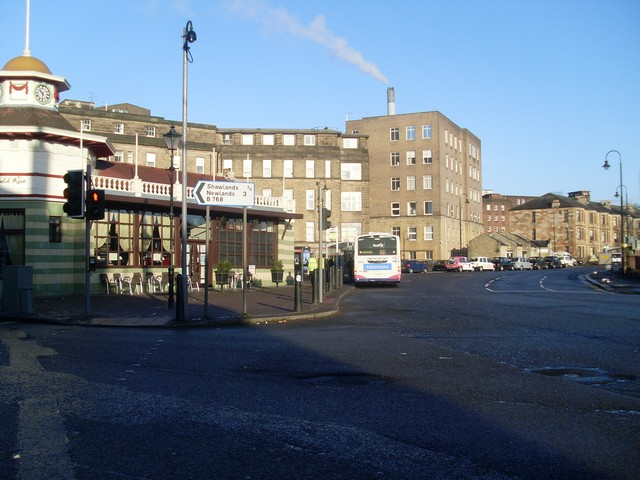
Grange Road at Battlefield Road

Housing consists mainly of three and four-storey Victorian and Edwardian tenements, although there are also numerous townhouses from the same era, and some modern properties.

Battlefield was formerly a centre of Glasgow's Jewish community, although most have now moved further south to Giffnock and Newton Mearns, or further afield to Manchester or Israel. The former synagogue has been converted to flats.

The area includes one of Glasgow's main hospitals, the New Victoria Hospital, as well as being the site of the former (old) Victoria Infirmary, with most of the latter area now being used for flats. Another key local landmark, the Battlefield Rest building and clocktower, was originally a tram shelter that has been converted into a restaurant. Another restaurant, the Church on the Hill, was previously the Langside Hill Church. There is also a Glasgow Clyde College location serving as a higher education institution for the area, previously the Langside College.

Langside Library, at the junction of Sinclair Drive and Battlefield Road, is the final Carnegie library in Glasgow.

The Southside Festival takes place in Queens Park in May annually. It celebrates the cultural diversity and uniqueness of the Southside of the city.
