= Glasgow Victoria Infirmary =

Victoria infirmary
- NHS Greater Glasgow and Clyde
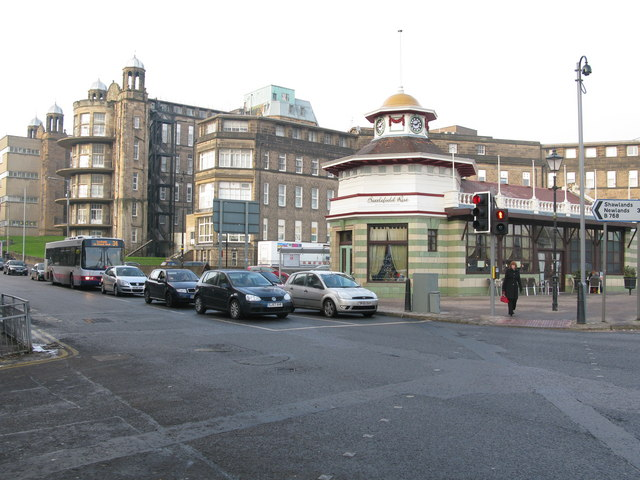
- Old Victoria Infirmary Buildings

- Shown in Glasgow

Geography
- Location: Langside Road, Glasgow, Scotland, United Kingdom
- Coordinates: 55.82742°N 4.26746°W

Organisation
- Care system: NHS Scotland
- Type: Teaching
- Affiliated university: University of Glasgow

Services
- Emergency department: Yes Accident & Emergency
- Beds: 370

History
- Founded: 1890
- Closed: 2015

Links
- Website: Victoria Infirmary
- Lists: Hospitals in Scotland

Glasgow Victoria Infirmary was a teaching hospital situated at Langside/Battlefield in the south-east of Glasgow from 1880 until 2015. It was managed by NHS Greater Glasgow and Clyde.

== History ==
A competition was held to design a 120-bedded hospital and this attracted 46 entries from architects around the UK. Campbell Douglas & Sellars won the competition to design the new voluntary hospital for the city's South Side in 1882. Building work began in 1888 and the infirmary was officially opened on 14 February 1890. The original buildings consisted of a central administration block, a lodge and one pavilion. A nurses' home was added in the 1890s and additional pavilions were added in 1902, to a design by Harry Edward Clifford, and in 1906.

The Victoria Infirmary obtained General Nursing Council approval for providing a 4 year nurse training course in 1918. Nurses who completed their training after 1923 were presented with the Victoria Infirmary solid silver badge with the puma emblem on it.

A new wing added an additional 120 beds to the hospital in 1927, another block provided a further 30 beds in 1931 and a further extension provided a further 50 beds in 1935. By 1939 the hospital had 555 beds.

Implementation of a development plan brought new laboratories, a theatre suite and teaching facilities in 1967.

After all inpatient and accident and emergency services had been transferred to the Queen Elizabeth University Hospital, the Glasgow Victoria Infirmary closed in May 2015. Housing provider Sanctuary Group then took over the 9.5-acre site in August 2016.

== New Victoria Hospital ==
The New Victoria Hospital opened as an ambulatory care facility on a site opposite the old hospital in June 2009, and it is where all outpatient services that were previously housed at the old Victoria are now located.

== Notable nursing staff ==
The following are the Matrons that worked at the Victoria Infirmary

1890 – 1894 Annie Ross, trained at Guy’s Hospital London.

1894 – 1910 Mary Mackinlay MacFarlane

1910 – 1917 Jessie Campbell, trained in the Victoria Infirmary.

1917 – 1936 Janet Sloan Rodger, RRC, also of the Royal College of Nursing Scotland Board.

1936 – 1944 Isabella Stewart, trained in Aberdeen Royal Infirmary, sister tutor, pioneer in developing a formal course of instruction for student nurses. She published Dietetics for nurses in 1928.

1945 – 1955 Barbara Quaile, OBE, trained in Edinburgh Royal Infirmary, returned there to take up post of Lady Superintendent of nurses.

1955 – 1965 Janet Locke, OBE, trained in the Victoria Infirmary.

1965 – 1968 Ishbel Cameron, trained in the Victoria Infirmary, elected member of the Royal College of Nursing Council Scottish Section.

1968 – 1982 Florence Mitchell, trained in the Victoria Infirmary.

Nursing Director

1982 – 1984 Anne Jarvie, trained in the Glasgow Royal Infirmary. She went on to become the Deputy Chief Nursing Officer at the Scottish Home and Health Department.
