= Langside =

Coordinates: 55.825585°N 4.279516°W

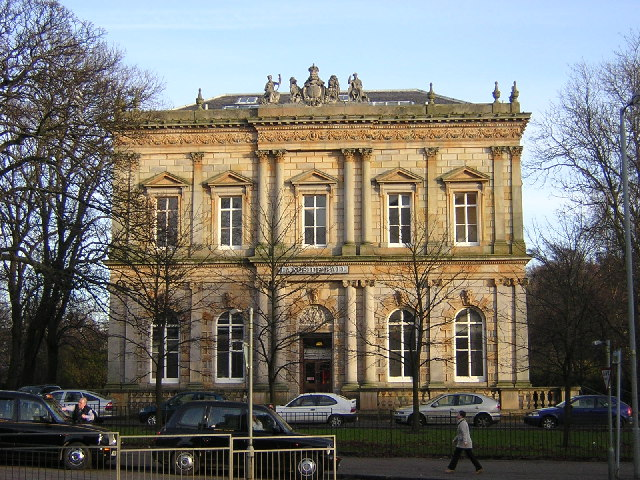
- Langside Hall

- Location within Glasgow
- Area: 0.46 km^{2} (0.18 sq mi)
- Population: 4,425 (2015)
  - Density: 9,620/km^{2} (24,900/sq mi)
- OS grid reference: NS573615
- Council area: Glasgow City Council
- Lieutenancy area: Glasgow
- Country: Scotland
- Sovereign state: United Kingdom
- Post town: GLASGOW
- Postcode district: G41
- Dialling code: 0141
- Police: Scotland
- Fire: Scottish
- Ambulance: Scottish
- UK Parliament: Glasgow South
- Scottish Parliament: Glasgow Cathcart

Langside is a district in the Scottish city of Glasgow. It is situated south of the River Clyde, and lies east of Shawlands, south of Queens Park, west of Cathcart and north of Newlands. The district is residential and primarily middle-class, and has become an increasingly fashionable address in recent years. The housing stock is mainly of the Victorian tenement type, along with some townhouses of the same period.

== History ==
In 1568 the area was the site of the Battle of Langside, the last battle fought by the forces of Mary, Queen of Scots, prior to her exile and death in England.

The original village of Langside was based around what is now Algie Street, named after Glasgow Merchant Matthew Algie, near the Battlefield Monument. There were two mills nearby on the White Cart, a meal mill and a paper mill which dated back to the 17th century. In the early 19th century most of the inhabitants of the village were weavers although they also cultivated fruits and flowers. The area South of the village, on what is now Mansionhouse Road, was a popular location for villas in the mid 19th century and included houses designed by Alexander "Greek" Thomson and Rawcliffe, a villa which was built in Scottish Baronial style: it was later used as a convent and has recently been converted to flats. The area to the West of the village at this time consisted of the Camphill Estate and Langside Estate during which time a number of the roads in the area such as Tantallon Road and Camphill Avenue were laid out. The Camphill Estate was bought by the Glasgow Corporation in 1893 and now forms the basis of Queen's Park.

In the late 19th century as Glasgow expanded South during the rapid growth of the industrialisation in the city, the area was built up with tenements. The area became part of the City of Glasgow in 1891, with the last of the original weaver's cottages being demolished in 1905. The area was served by trams from 1901 with the terminus being at the Victoria Infirmary in what is now the Battlefield Rest. The Langside Library opened in 1915 and was the last library in Glasgow to be built with funds from Andrew Carnegie.

In 2016, a group of local people launched Langside Community Heritage, to promote the history and heritage of the area. A number of events have already taken place and, in conjunction with other community groups, a commemoration of the Battle of Langside took place over the weekend of 12/13 May 2018, the 450th anniversary.

Today, Langside incorporates various distinct estates, including the 12-acre Mansionhouse Gardens estate with its protected woodland, and the 2011 Rawcliffe development directly across Mansionhouse Road. House prices are typically higher here than in neighboring boroughs like Shawlands or Battlefield to the west and east respectively, while Langside is also bordered by Queens Park to the north, and the Cathcart Circle train line to the south.

== Governance ==
Langside is part of the Glasgow South and Glasgow Southside constituencies in the UK and Scottish Parliaments respectively and is currently represented in Westminster by Gordon McKee.

Langside gives its name to Ward 7 of the Glasgow City Council area which also includes the areas of Battlefield, King's Park and Mount Florida.

Councillor	Party
Susan Aitken	SNP
Paul Leinster	SNP
Holly Bruce	Green
Stephen Ignatius Docherty	Labour

== Transport ==
Langside is served by a railway station offering regular commuter services to Glasgow Central Station (high level) on the Cathcart Circle.
