= The Step Music =

Indie rock band

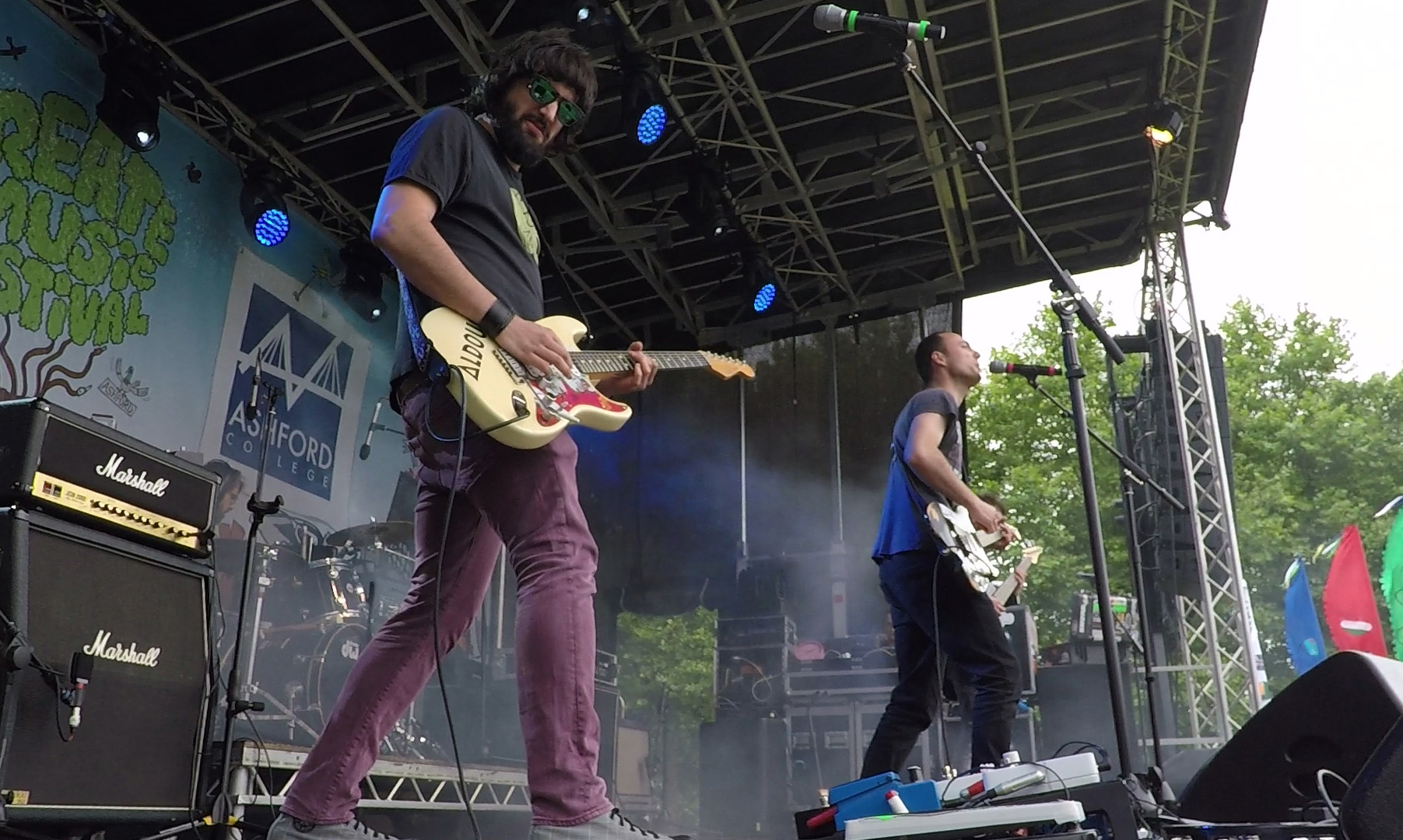
- The Step Music live at Ashford's Create Music Festival in 2017

Background information
- Origin: London, England
- Genres: Indie rock, Alternative rock, Pop rock
- Years active: 2007–present
- Members: Stefano Donato, Oliviero Fella
- Website: www.thestepmusic.com

The Step Music is an indie rock, alternative, band based in London. The band was originally formed in Rome in 2007 by lead vocalist Stefano Donato. In 2013, guitarist Oliviero Fella joined the project when the band relocated to London. The group is also known simply as The Step.

== History ==
The Step Music was founded in Rome in 2007 by frontman Stefano Donato. After relocating to London in 2013, the band began performing at various London venues. In March 2015, they played at the official aftershow party for Noel Gallagher.

In December 2014, The Step released their debut EP. A review on the music website Renowned For Sound described the Gravity EP as "a bright and confident debut effort" with "sensitive and thoughtful lyrics" and praised the band for delivering "a promising start with room to grow".

In 2015, their singles "Gravity" and "Something More" were included in the soundtrack of the Brazilian TV drama Cúmplices de um Resgate aired by SBT. Their single "Let It Go Friends" was played by DJ Jim Gellatly on Amazing Radio.

The band's debut album No War To Win was released in 2017 and was positively reviewed by Italian and international music media.

== Musical style ==
The Step Music's sound blends indie rock, alternative rock, and pop rock with influences from the Italian alternative scene. Their music is known for introspective lyrics, bittersweet melodies, post-Britpop textures, piano arrangements, jittery guitars, and dynamic drums.

== Band members ==
=== Core members ===
- Stefano Donato – vocals
- Oliviero Fella – lead guitar

=== Live members ===
- Mattia De Santis – drums
- Carlo Andrea Salaris – drums
- Enrico Bartoli – bass
- Riccardo Vitale – bass
- Luca Oggioni – bass
- Mimmo Marfuggi – bass
- Giulio Petralia – bass
- Pietro Cicci – bass

== Discography ==
=== Albums ===
- No War To Win (2017)

=== EPs ===
- Gravity (2014)

=== Selected singles ===
- "Gravity" (2014)
- "Let It Go Friends" (2015)
- "Horizon" (2016)
- "Stay Awake" (2016)
- "Human Machines" (2017)
- "Live Forever" (2020)
- "Hello" (2025)
