= NB (TV programme) =

- Genre: arts
- Created by: Donny O'Rourke
- Country of origin: United Kingdom
- Original language: English
- No. of series: 23

Production
- Running time: 30 minutes
- Production company: Scottish Television

Original release
- Release: 27 April 1989 – 1997

NB is a Scottish television programme about the arts and what's on guide in the entertainment world within the Central belt of Scotland.

== History ==
NB debuted in 1989 and aired until it ended in 1997. Produced by Scottish Television, it was largely conceived by its producer Donny O'Rourke, and presented by a young, all-Scottish cast. Daily Record television critic Paul English wrote that the show "helped shape the taste of Scotland's clubbers, gig-goers, opera lovers and theatre-buffs too".

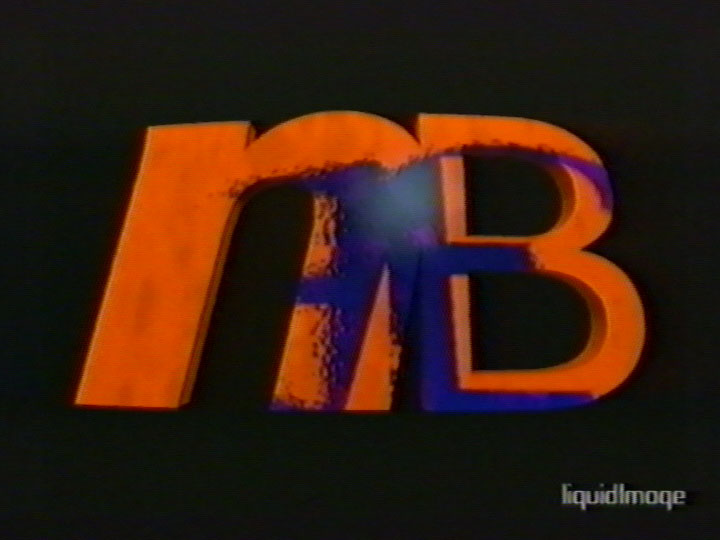
NB title sequence from 1993 by Liquid Image for Scottish Television

=== Series ===
23 series were produced, with most years having 3 series each.

- Series 1: 27 April – 1 June 1989: 6 episodes
- Series 2: 2 October – November 1989

== Presenters ==
- Janice Forsyth (1989–1995)
- Bryan Burnett (1989–1993)
- Allan Campbell (1989–1997)
- Dougie Vipond (1993–1997)
- Sally Gray (1995–1997)
- Angus Coull (1996–1997)
