= Minty (TV series) =

Television series

- Genre: Children's television series; Drama; Comedy
- Countries of origin: Australia; United Kingdom
- No. of seasons: 1
- No. of episodes: 13

Production
- Running time: 25 minutes
- Production companies: Scottish Television; RT Films

Original release
- Network: ABC Australia
- Release: 20 August – 7 September 1998

Minty is a 1998 comedy television series, in which Australian actress Angela Kelly appeared in the dual roles of Minty and Melanie (an Australian girl and an English girl who are identical in appearance).

The 13-episode series was co-produced by Scottish Television (now STV Central) and RT Films in association with the Australian Broadcasting Corporation and supported by ScreenWest and The Lotteries Commission of Western Australia.

== Cast ==
- Angela Kelly as Minty Sullivan / Melanie Hobson
- Damian De Montemas as Shane Connor
- Kim De Lury as Cameron Davis
- Vivienne Garrett as Pamela-Anne
- Bill Kerr as Willie Courtenay
- Michael Loney as Lionel Hobson
- Phineas Glover as Alex Hobson
- Peter O'Brien as Ric da Silva

== Plot ==
When British schoolgirl Melanie Hobson wins a trip to Australia in a competition, she is amazed to discover, on arrival at the airport, that she has a double, Minty Sullivan, an Australian soap opera star. Minty who is getting tired of her life as a soap-opera actress, is dressed as Cinderella as part of a prize for a fan of Minty's television program (the winner has won the right to be Minty's partner at an awards ceremony). Melanie and Minty swap identities, and Melanie keeps Minty's appointment as Cinderella.

After this, Minty and Melanie often swap places – with almost nobody suspecting the truth of the situation. Although the two girls seem to be identical in many ways, there are significant differences between the two. For instance, Melanie is good at sport – but Minty is not; Melanie can sing – but Minty can't; Minty can dance – but Melanie can't; Minty is studious – but Melanie is not; Minty knows about wildlife – but Melanie does not (Melanie thinks that whales are fish).

Melanie has parents and a brother – as well as many aunts and uncles in England. However, Minty has no family. The two girls manage to share in each other's lives – both in England and Australia – by continuing to swap identities. In the final episode they finally switch places for good, Melanie starting a singing career while Minty enjoys the chance to have a real family.

== Episodes ==
1. No Worries, Cinderella
2. No Probs, Princess
3. If I Were You
4. Dangerous Creatures
5. I've Got Who Babe?
6. Between Rock 'n' Roll and a Hard Place
7. The Great Escape
8. Secret Identity
9. Good One, Sport
10. Reality Bites Back
11. All The World's A Stage
12. Double Exposure
13. All Good Things

== Soundtrack ==
"I Wanna Be Free" was released as a single from the TV show's 1999 soundtrack "Minty: Favourite Songs From The Hit TV Series". "I Wanna Be Free" made it to #67 on the official United Kingdom singles charts on the week of 23 January 1999. Angela Kelly sings every song on the ten-track soundtrack. The soundtrack was released by Virgin Records.

Track list

1. I Wanna Be Free
2. Wish I Could
3. Don't Look Back
4. Secret Identity
5. In Your Head
6. Hard Habit To Break
7. Destination Somewhere Wonderful
8. Show Me
9. Snakes And Ladders
10. I Found Myself in You

== DVD release ==
The series was released on DVD in Region 4 exclusively on the Taylor Media web store on Tuesday 14 December 2010.

== Trivia ==
- The Australian Broadcasting Corporation originally intended to follow up the series with a sequel. However, this never happened.
- The programme was re-aired in 2009 on wknd@stv – a children's television strand on Scottish television channel, STV.
