= Paul Campbell (entrepreneur) =

British entrepreneur and musician (born 1959)

Paul Andrew Campbell (born 1959) is a British entrepreneur and musician. He is the founder of amazing, the digital media brand, and CEO of Amazing Media, operator of Amazing Radio, Amazing TV and CMJ.

== Education ==
Campbell was born in north-east England and educated at RGS Newcastle and New College, Oxford, where he read English Literature.

== Early career ==
Campbell started his media career as a BBC General Trainee. He became a producer of File on 4, the BBC Radio 4 current affairs programme. After producing and directing BBC Television programmes such as Russell Harty and Brass Tacks, he left the BBC to freelance as a TV Producer with Diverse Production and Zenith Productions.

In 1989 he founded Bell Television, a London-based television production company which diversified into radio, commercials, corporate films and new media, building its first website for The Barbican Centre in 1995. It was an early adopter of desktop digital production techniques to deliver content across multiple platforms.

During the dot-com bubble Bell focused entirely on new media, working for clients such as Granada Television, Goldman Sachs, JP Morgan and UBS Warburg from offices in Carnaby Street, London and New York. In 2002 Campbell re-located to north-east England and co-founded Liberty Bell Productions (the TV company which produced Grumpy Old Men for the BBC) with former ITV CEO Stuart Prebble and The Tube creator Andrea Wonfor. In 2003 he founded 'Amazing'.

== Amazing ==
Amazing started life as an educational software company, making content for schools and colleges in a partnership with the UK's leading private schools. In 2005, while reading a biography of Steve Jobs, Campbell had the idea of expanding into an ethical music business to help emerging artists and promote new music. 'amazingtunes.com' launched as a beta website in 2006 and was spun off as a separate company in 2007. Amazing Radio launched in 2009, a national digital station broadcasting 100% new music. ‘Amazing' now includes Amazing Radio stations based in the UK and USA, Amazing TV (similar to MTV in its heyday), and the New York-based music festival CMJ, as well as The Amazing Chart, an unsigned chart published weekly by the European music industry journal Music Week.

== Musical experience ==
Campbell has performed as a freelance professional musician for most of his life, playing timpani, percussion and drums. He started studying aged 9, gave his professional debut aged 11, and by age 21 had played in The Royal Albert Hall, Royal Festival Hall, The Marquee Club and BBC Maida Vale Studios. He now freelances part-time as a timpanist with Royal Northern Sinfonia and other professional orchestras and plays jazz and rock drums for pleasure. He also plays the piano.

== Awards and honours ==
Campbell has an MA from Oxford University, is a Fellow of the Royal Society of Arts and in 2011 was awarded an honorary Doctorate of Business Administration by Sunderland University.

He won the Broadcasting Press Guild Award for 'outstanding radio programme' in 1984 for File on 4 and has other creative awards in a variety of electronic media, including three New York Film Festival Awards and a Communication Achievement Award for 'Excellence in the Use of Video'.

== Personal life and other activities ==
Campbell is a member of the British Association of Snowsport Instructors and has taught skiing in the European Alps. He was a governor of Royal Grammar School, Newcastle, a Governor of Sunderland University and a founder member and director of The Entrepreneurs' Forum, a networking association for British entrepreneurs. He lives in Northumberland and New York. Paul has 3 children, the youngest studying at University, the middle child working as a professional choral singer in London, and the oldest working in marketing.
