= Louise Steel =

Louise Steel may refer to:

- Louise Steel (archaeologist), Welsh archaeologist
- Louise Steel (broadcaster) (born 1985), Scottish broadcaster
