= The Hot Rod Dogs and Cool Car Cats =

Animated television series

- Created by: Dave Edwards
- Voices of: Dana Hill; Jim Cummings; Russi Taylor; Frank Welker
- Composers: Ben Heneghan; Ian Lawson
- Countries of origin: United Kingdom; United States
- Original language: English
- No. of series: 2
- No. of episodes: 52

Production
- Producers: Dave Edwards; Mike Young; Liz Young
- Running time: 10 minutes
- Production companies: Dave Edwards Studio; Mike Young Productions; Rainbow Animation Group; Scottish Television

Original release
- Network: ITV (CITV)
- Release: September 9, 1995 – June 15, 1996

The Hot Rod Dogs and Cool Car Cats is a British American animated television series which aired between September 9, 1995, and June 15, 1996, on ITV kids strand CITV, and was shown on May 11, 2009, on Scottish children's programme wknd@stv. The series is about anthropomorphic automobiles that bear resemblances to cats and dogs. The main characters are freedom fighters trying to save their homeworld of Autopia from The Crusher. The show ran for two seasons, each consisting of 26 ten-minute episodes.

== Heroes ==
Hot Rod: A red dog-car, and the main character of the series. He was on his way to camp when he was captured by The Crusher's forces. He managed to escape and join the resistance movement. He has an attraction to his best friend, Carbs. He was upgraded by the mechanic Gus (see below), gaining larger tires, a cog-firing weapon that can also be used as a buzzsaw, and the ability to fly (but only when he needs them). Gus later built an external weapons pack for Hot Rod, equipped with long-range armaments. Both Gus and The Crusher hinted that there was something "special" about Hot Rod, but it was never elaborated on.

Carbs (Short for "Carburetta"): A pink cat-car, and Hot Rod's best friend. They first met when they were captured by The Crusher's forces. She seems to share the attraction between Hot Rod and herself. She too was upgraded by Gus, gaining high-intensity headlights, tire claws, and an extendable tail. Her sister, Spare Parts, later built her a weapons pack, similar to Hot Rod's.

Dog-Gone: An old and wily brown dog-car. He often provides reason and wisdom for the group, when he isn't keeping his friend Benz from falling apart.

Benz: A green dog-car, and Dog-Gone's best friend. In major disrepair, "Benji" is always falling apart.

Gus: A light grey dog-car, and legendary mechanic. He was the one who built The Crusher, and exiled himself when his creation went out of control. He later outfitted Hot Rod and Carbs with weaponry, to better combat The Crusher's forces.

== Villains ==
The Crusher: Originally designed to recycle the junk of Autopia, something went horribly wrong, and he became a power-hungry monster.

Scarhood: A bounty hunter, and The Crusher's main henchman. A mean and nasty black Dog-car, he has gained a personal vendetta against Hot Rod for his numerous defeats.

Choppers: Scarhood's idiot henchmen. A band of nasty-looking Cat-cars, equipped with a variety of weapons. They consist of their leader, Gadget (whose son, Socket, appeared in one episode), Firefur, Carpoon, and One-Eye.

Gridlockers: Autopia's police force, completely under the Crusher's proverbial thumb. They are led by Number One, who is assisted by Number Two. The lower ranking officers are Number Three and Number Four.

== Other characters ==
Sandcat: A junk merchant in the city of Catatonia. His trade was greatly increased thanks to Hot Rod and friends.

Bentley Royce: A news reporter. He has an annoying habit of showing up when he's not wanted, and of getting his interviewees name's wrong.

Towhead: A young dog-car who pretended to be a friend in order to infiltrate the resistance. He intended to have them lead him and Scarhood to Gus, but his plan was thwarted by Hot Rod's intervention.

Baby Bumper: A baby dog-car who twice found his way into the hero's camp, leaving Hot Rod and Carbs to care for him.

Spare Parts: Carbs' older sister. She appeared in a couple of episodes. An expert mechanic, on par with Gus, she built Carbs' weapons' pack.

Jag: An evil cat-car with the ability to hypnotize others. She managed to infiltrate the camp, but was swiftly defeated. She expressed an "interest" in Scarhood.

Hot Rod's parents: Hot Rod's mother and father who only appear in the first episode, They always try to be "carful" and they love and care for Hot Rod dearly, Hot Rod's mother is a blue dog-car with a star emblem with the number 9 in it and a red light on her head so it can only assume that she works for the police but this was not explained, Hod Rod's father is a brown dog-car with bushy eyebrows and something that looks like a green mohawk on his head.

== Voice cast ==
- Hot Rod: Dana Hill
- Carbs/Jag: Russi Taylor
- Dog-Gone/Benz: Frank Welker
- Spare Parts/Baby Bumpers: Kath Soucie
- Crusher/Scarhood: Jim Cummings

== Broadcast ==
The programme was re-aired in Ireland on Den 2 in 1998-2003 and in UK On Sky One as part of The DJ Kat Show and in Australia on Cheez TV Network Ten And in 2009 on wknd@stv - a children's television strand on Scottish television channel, STV.
