= Passport Quiz =

Scottish Gameshow

- Created by: Bryan Burnett
- Presented by: Bryan Burnett
- Country of origin: United Kingdom
- Original language: English

Production
- Running time: 30 mins (inc. adverts)
- Production company: Scottish Television

Original release
- Network: Scottish Television, Grampian Television
- Release: 26 February 1998 – 9 August 2002

Related
- Scottish Passport

Passport Quiz is a Scottish Gameshow created by Bryan Burnett in which three pairs of contestants competed to win cash and prizes. The programme ran between 1998 and 2002 and was produced by Scottish Television.

== History ==
Bryan Burnett was the Co-host of Scottish Passport, which started in 1994. In 1998 Burnett came up with the idea for the show, in which contestants would use their knowledge of world geography when answering questions to win prizes.

== Broadcast ==
Five series were broadcast between 1998 and 2002, on Scottish Television and Grampian Television.

- Series 1 : 25 Episodes (1998)
- Series 2 : 26 Episodes (1999)
- Series 3 : 50 Episodes (2000-2001)
- Series 4 : 25 Episodes (2002)
- Series 5 : 25 Episodes (2002)
