= Red Amber Green =

Scottish Children's Television Show

Red Amber Green is a Scottish Television children's game show hosted by Bryan Burnett, and later Craig Elliott, that ran from 1996 to 1999. The title refers to the colours of traffic lights.

Two school students competed against each other in a series of questions to earn points. The questions were divided into three categories based on the colours of traffic lights. The winner participated in a bonus round in which 9 traffic light questions had to be answered to win the star prize.

== Series ==
- 1st: 8 July – 9 August 1996: 25 Episodes. Were broadcast Summer School Holidays.
- 2nd: 7–28 August 1997: 15 Episodes. Were broadcast Summer School Holidays.
- 3rd: 6 January – 23 June 1998: 24 Episodes. Were broadcast weekly on Tuesday teatimes, No episode broadcast on 16 June due to World Cup coverage.
- 4th: 13 January – 15 December 1999: 26 Episodes. Were broadcast weekly on Wednesday teatimes from 13 January to 31 March then remaining episodes were shown from 22 September – 15 December.
