= Sergeant (band) =

Scottish indie rock band

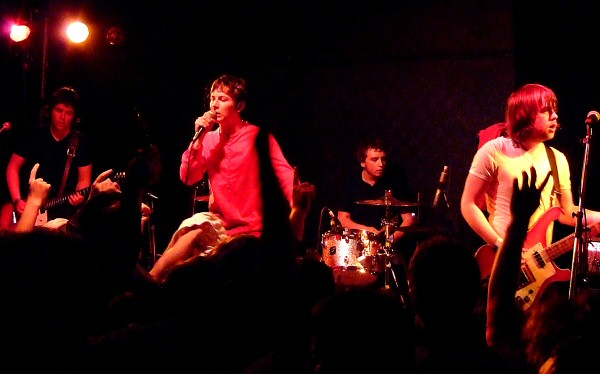
- Sergeant in 2007

Background information
- Origin: Glenrothes, Scotland
- Genre: Indie rock
- Years active: 2004–2010
- Label: Mercury Records
- Past members: Nick Mercer; Scott Duncan; Bill Anderson; Rory Buchanan

Sergeant were a Scottish four-piece indie rock band from Glenrothes in Fife. In 2007, they signed a contract with Mercury Records and played both the T in the Park and Glastonbury festivals that year. The band received good reviews for their live shows and attracted support from Jim Gellatly of Xfm Scotland and from Alan McGee, who called the group "a major talent".

Prior to the release of their album, the band were chosen to support Oasis on four Scottish dates and also to support the Fratellis on their full UK tour. Sergeant reformed for a one-off gig in Glenrothes in June 2018 to celebrate the town's 70th anniversary.

== Members ==
- Nick Mercer – vocals
- Scott Duncan – guitars
- Bill Anderson – bass
- Rory Buchanan – drums, percussion

== Discography ==
Albums

- Sergeant (2009)

EPs

- Sergeant (2007)

Singles

- "K-Ok" (2008)
- "Sunshine" (2008)
