= Louise Steel (broadcaster) =

Scottish broadcaster

Louise Steel (born 19 February 1985) is a Scottish broadcaster.

Originally from Aberdeen, Steel has worked on several television programmes including BBC Scotland's The Saturday Show and STV's Club Cupid. She has also been a presenter and newsreader for Grampian Hospital Radio.

Steel is currently a production journalist for STV North and also a stand-in presenter/producer for the station's online video blog, Northern Exposure. She is also a presenter/producer of stv.tv's fashion video features.
