= Michelle Watt =

Scottish television presenter and interior designer (1977-2015)

Michelle Watt (13 May 1977 – 24 June 2015) was a Scottish television presenter and interior designer. She was the daughter of Jim Watt, a former professional boxer and WBC world lightweight champion. Among the television shows she presented were the Junior Eurovision Song Contest, STV Appeal, the National Lottery Daily Play, the Live New Year Show, 60 Minute Makeover and Club Cupid.

Watt was also a newspaper columnist for The Scottish Sun newspaper.

== Biography ==
Watt was born in 1977, the daughter of Jim Watt, a boxing world lightweight champion, and his wife, Margaret. In 1995, when Watt was 18 years old, she and her family suffered the loss of her brother, Jim, one year her junior, in a car accident.

In 2008, Watt became one of the hosts of "60 Minute Makeover" on ITV.

On 24 June 2015, Watt committed suicide. She was experiencing pain following a surgical procedure. Watt had been suffering from headaches and blackouts when she visited an eye doctor for tests in 2014; after being told she needed to go to a hospital immediately, she was given CAT scans and MRI tests, which showed she had calcium deposits on her optical nerve. A lumbar puncture operation was performed to discover the root of her medical condition, a procedure her father later disclosed that she had done despite the Watts' supposed knowledge that actor George Clooney had been suicidal after having one performed on him.

== Personal life ==
Watt first met her husband, Paul Kerr, when she was 14. The two had a daughter who was five years old when Watt died.

She lived in Airth, Stirlingshire.
