= Jim Gellatly =

Scottish radio presenter and disk jockey

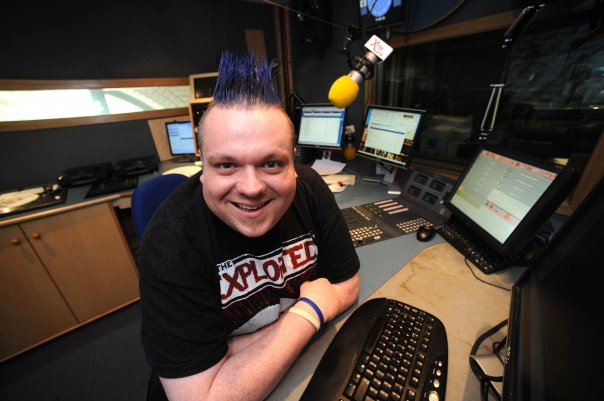
- Jim Gellatly
- Born: James Norman Gellatly; 4 March 1968 (age 58); Dundee, Scotland
- Presenting career
- Show: Jim Gellatly Show
- Station: Amazing Radio
- Time slot: Sunday 2 – 4 pm
- Show: Breakfast Show
- Station: BFBS Radio Scotland
- Time slot: Weekdays 6.30 – 10 am
- Style: Disc Jockey
- Country: United Kingdom

James Norman Gellatly (born 4 March 1968) is a Scottish radio presenter and DJ. He presented Drivetime on XFM Scotland until its closure. Currently he hosts Afternoons on BFBS Radio in Germany, and does a weekly new music showcase on Amazing Radio.

== Biography ==
Educated at the private High School of Dundee and Strathallan School, Gellatly is married to Candy and has three children. His late father, Ian Gellatly, was Chairman of Dundee Football Club and President of the Scottish Football League, while his grandfather was chairman of the club when they won the Scottish League Championship in 1961–62.

Gellatly began as a volunteer for Moray Firth Radio in Inverness in the late 80s, moving to Northsound Radio in Aberdeen in the early 90s. He joined the launch of Glasgow-based radio station Beat 106 in November 1999. Following a shift in the station's music policy, he left after just a few months to join Chrysalis-backed internet radio project Puremix in London. In January 2001 he returned to Beat 106 on Sunday nights, while continuing to work in London during the week. When Puremix folded, he returned to Scotland on a full-time basis. When Beat 106 rebranded as XFM Scotland, he presented the 'X-Posure' showcase for new music.

Gellatly is credited as the first radio DJ to play KT Tunstall, Glasvegas, Biffy Clyro, The Fratellis, Twin Atlantic, The Enemy, Sergeant and his hometown band The View. In December 2007, and December 2008 he presented Amy MacDonald with sales discs onstage at the Barrowland in Glasgow. He featured in 'The Daily Record's Razz Hot 100' in 2007. He'd previously featured in an 'Evening Times Glasgow 100' list, the local paper's list of powerful people.

In April 2008 he received a Radio Academy PRS John Peel Award for Outstanding Contribution to Music Radio. On 28 August 2008, Gellatly left XFM Scotland, and on 3 October 2008 he began presenting The Music Bed on BBC Radio Scotland. The Music Bed was axed in December 2009.

During the summer of 2010 he hosted a Saturday afternoon show 'Jim Gellatly's A-Z of Rock and Pop' on Clyde 1. In July 2010 he launched an unsigned showcase on DAB digital radio station Amazing Radio. In:Demand Uncut launched on 1 May 2011 on Bauer Radio's Scottish network (except MFR).

Jim returned to the re-launched XFM Scotland in April 2014 to present the Drivetime show. He continues to present a two-hour New Music showcase on Amazing Radio, preceding the Top 40 show every Sunday afternoon.

He appeared on Scottish TV in STV's search for Scotland's Greatest Album. The show was a joint venture between STV, Real Radio and The Sun who convened a panel of music industry experts to select an initial short list of 60 tracks. The public chose the final tracks to appear on the Album. Alongside Gellatly, the panel consisted of T in the Park supremo Geoff Ellis, SNP MSP Joan McAlpine, Real Radio DJ Steve McKenna, songwriter John McLaughlin, and football pundit and now popular DJ Pat Nevin.

His New Music podcast was nominated in the Best Radio Show or Podcast category at the 2010 BT Digital Music Awards but was unplaced.

After a stint at community radio station CamGlen Radio, Jim joined BFBS Radio in May 2018 to present the Breakfast Show in Scotland. He moved to the Falkland Islands with BFBS in January 2022 to present the Breakfast Show there before returning to the Edinburgh operation in July 2022. In July 2024 he was detached to BFBS Germany for 6 months.
