= Des Clarke (comedian) =

British comedian (born 1981)

- Born: 13 January 1981 (age 45); Glasgow, Scotland
- Education: Holyrood R.C Secondary School
- Occupation: Stand-up comedian
- Presenting career
- Show: Radio Presenter at Heart Scotland
- Time slot: Mon-Fri, 6 am – 10 am

Desmond Martin Clarke (born 13 January 1981) is a Scottish stand-up comedian and television and radio presenter. Clarke currently presents Heart Breakfast on Heart Scotland with co-hosts Adele Cunningham and Grado (weekdays from 6:30am to 10 am, formerly with co-host Jennifer Reoch from STV until July 2025). He writes a weekly column in the Daily Record, and also presents the BBC Radio Scotland topical quiz show Breaking the News.

== Early life ==
Clarke was raised in the Gorbals district of Glasgow and attended Holyrood Secondary School.

== Career ==
=== Television ===
Clarke presented ITV's children's television show SMTV Live from March to December 2003, following the departure of Ant & Dec. He has hosted Whatever on Sky One, Discovery's Invention SOS and Club Cupid, the adult dating show on STV as well as fronting the Scottish coverage of Children in Need.

Clarke has also appeared in BBC One's Live Floor Show and BBC Two's World Cup's Most Shocking Moments.

=== Radio ===
On 3 January 2011, Galaxy Scotland was renamed Capital Scotland, where he became a breakfast co-presenter alongside Jennie Cook, and later Steven Mill and Amy Irons.

In 2015, Clarke began presenting the topical quiz show Breaking the News on Radio Scotland.

In March 2019, it was announced that Clarke would be moving to Heart Scotland as part of a reshuffle at Global Radio, who announced that Heart, Capital, and Smooth would be moving to all National Breakfast shows. He presented the Heart Scotland Drivetime Show weekdays from 4 pm – 7 pm alongside Jennifer Reoch.

In April 2023, Global announced a refreshed schedule for Heart Scotland and its sister station Capital Scotland. Clarke and Reoch were confirmed to be new hosts of Heart Breakfast with Des & Jennifer weekdays from 6:30 am. The new schedule for Scotland started on 2 May.
