= Bryan Burnett =

Scottish television and radio presenter

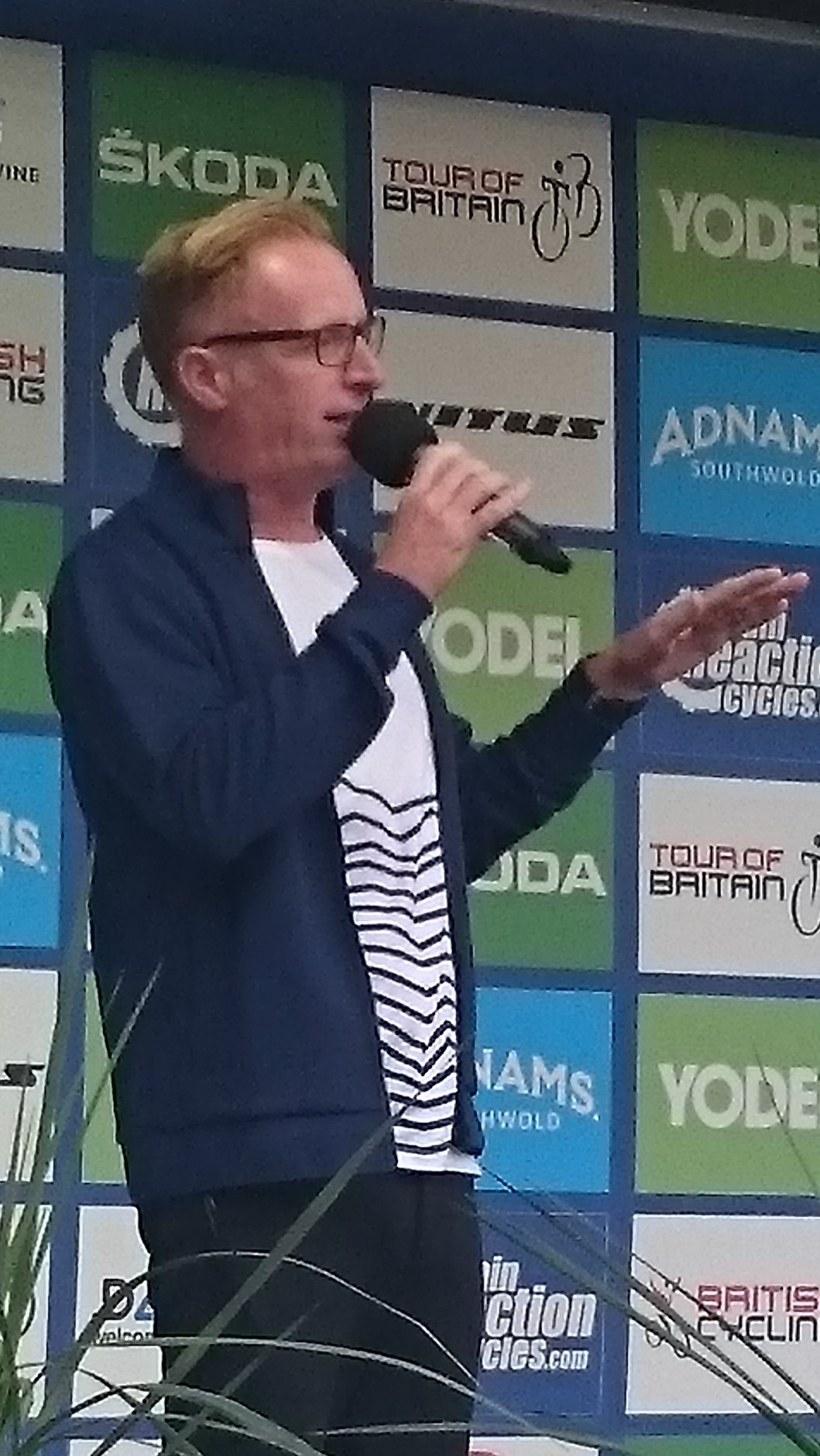
Burnett in 2016

Bryan Burnett is a Scottish television and radio presenter, currently best known for his work with BBC Radio Scotland.

Burnett began his career at Northsound Radio in Aberdeen, before spending six years with Radio Clyde in Glasgow, where he presented the Top 40 chart show.

During the 1990s and early 2000s he presented numerous programmes for Scottish Television, including holiday show Scottish Passport and game shows Passport Quiz, Red Amber Green and Party Animals.

For 15 years Burnett presented Brand New Country on BBC Radio Scotland, earning him the title International Broadcaster of the Year at the 2005 Country Music Association awards in Nashville. He currently presents Get It On a music requests show whereby listeners submit requests based on a particular theme.
