= Amazing Radio =

Internet radio station

Coordinates: 54.966038°N 1.603667°W

- London, New York City, Boston
- Broadcast area: Worldwide: DAB, online
- Branding: Amazing, CMJ, OurStage

Programming
- Format: New and Emerging Artists

Ownership
- Owner: Amazing Media Group

History
- First air date: 1 June 2009

Links
- Webcast: Listen Live URL
- Website: amazingradio.com

Amazing Radio is an international radio station founded in the UK by entrepreneur, musician, and former BBC producer Paul Campbell. It is credited with providing early exposure to artists who later achieved mainstream success, including Alt-J, Haim, Bastille, The 1975, Dua Lipa, Sam Fender and Wet Leg.

== History ==
The concept for Amazing Radio was developed by Paul Campbell. Campbell worked as a musician and as a radio and television producer at the BBC before starting his own companies. The first component of the enterprise was the Amazing Tunes website, which launched in beta in 2006 and was established as a separate company in 2007. The platform served as a submission portal where unsigned artists could upload their music. Artists can now submit their music via the Amazing Radio website.

Amazing Radio launched its broadcast service on 1 June 2009. The station began broadcasting nationally in the UK on the DAB multiplex. It replaced a test transmission that consisted of bird calls. The station established its headquarters in Gateshead, North East England.

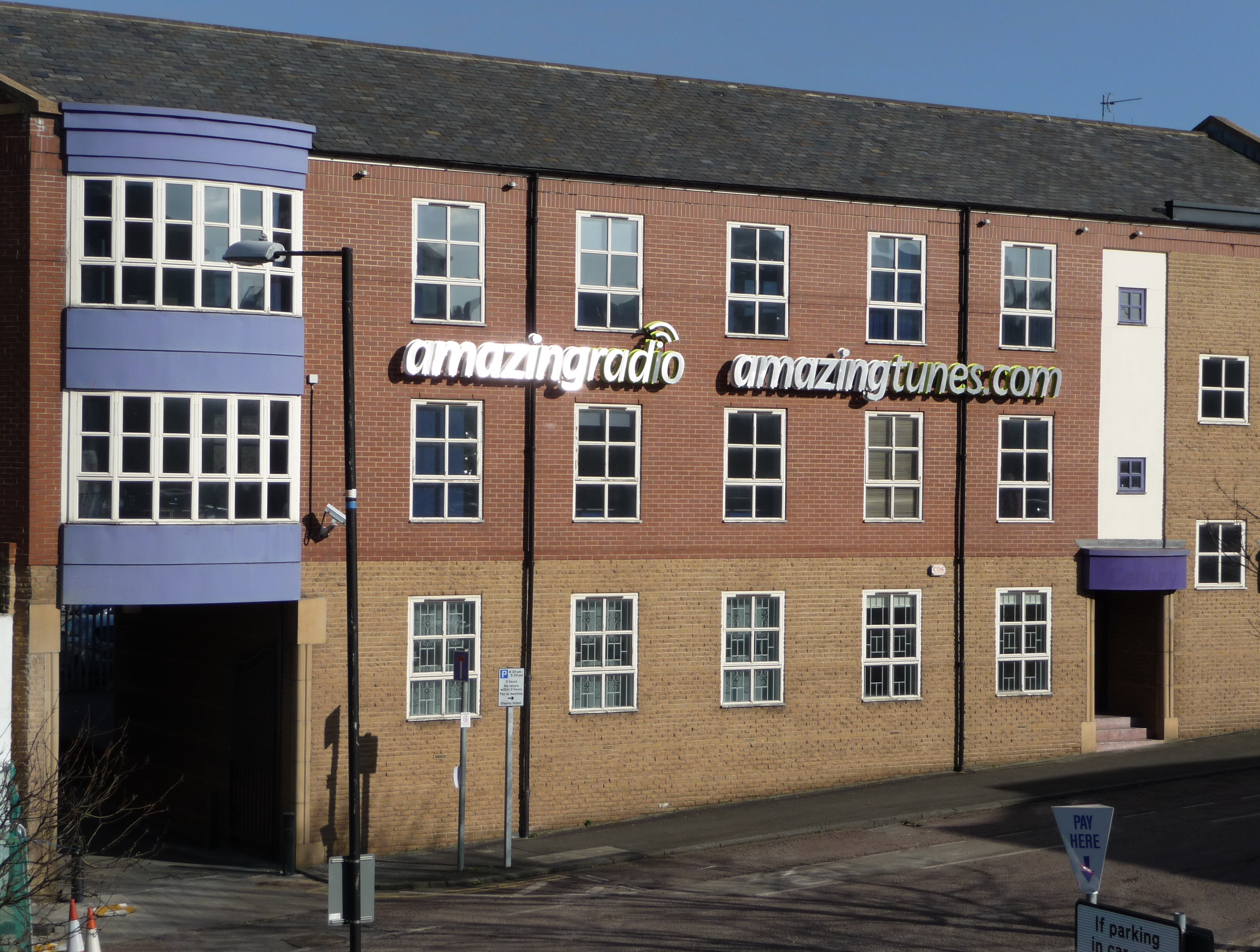
Amazing Radio's former location next to the Tyne Bridge in Gateshead

In May 2012, Amazing Radio ceased its broadcast on the national Digital One DAB platform and became a primarily internet-only radio station. Campbell stated that the move was a choice driven by the costs of national DAB transmission compared to its growing online listenership. The station later returned to DAB on a limited basis, launching services in Dublin and London.

In 2020, the company expanded into the North American market with the launch of Amazing Radio USA. The service was designed for American listeners and focused on emerging artists from the United States, with a roster of US-based presenters. Amazing Radio USA is operated by an American entity, Amazing America, LLC, based in Colorado, under a license from the UK-based parent company, The Amazing Media Group. The parent group owns the global "Amazing" and "CMJ" brand trademarks.

The parent company, The Amazing Media Group, is privately held and supported by private shareholders. Investors include the musician Sting and AOL co-founder Steve Case.

== Disputes with PRS for Music and BBC ==
Upon its 2009 launch, the station announced it would not play music by artists registered with PRS for Music. Campbell argued that PRS's licensing structure was unfair to the unsigned artists the station supported. He stated that PRS's online license required a percentage of all revenue from the Amazing Tunes platform, including from sales of non-PRS members' music. He contended this would mean taking money from independent artists to pay royalties to established PRS members. After PRS reportedly changed its licensing terms, Amazing Radio signed a licensing agreement with the organization.

Campbell also criticized the BBC's "BBC Introducing" platform, filing a formal complaint with the BBC Trust alleging unfair competition. He argued that BBC Introducing, with its scale and public funding, constituted a "new service" that distorted the market for private companies like Amazing Radio and should have been subjected to a "Public Value Test" before its launch. Campbell stated that his complaint was not in opposition to the BBC's support of new music, but against what he considered to be anti-competitive practices.

== Acquisition and relaunch of CMJ ==
CMJ, founded in 1978 by Robert Haber as College Media Journal, was a long-standing trade publication and festival organizer in the American independent music scene. It was known for the CMJ New Music Report, a trade publication with college radio charts, and the CMJ Music Marathon, an annual festival and conference held in New York City from 1980 to 2015. The Marathon was an event for discovering new artists.

By the 2010s, the company experienced financial and legal difficulties following a series of ownership changes. After a 2014 sale to Adam Klein, staff reportedly stopped receiving pay in late 2015, the 2016 Music Marathon was canceled, and the company ceased operations. The company faced lawsuits from former employees over unpaid wages, and Klein later filed for bankruptcy.

In December 2019, CMJ's social media accounts became active again, announcing a 2020 relaunch under new management. On 6 April 2020, it was publicly announced that Amazing Radio was the new owner. Amazing Radio announced its plans to revive the in-person CMJ Music Marathon in New York City in October 2020. However, the planned large-scale revival of the physical festival did not occur.

Amazing Radio recently launched CMJ TV - an on demand and live video streaming service showcasing music videos uploaded by Amazing Radio artists.

== A launchpad for mainstream artists ==
Amazing Radio is known for providing early radio airplay to artists who later achieved commercial success. The station maintains a "Hall of Fame" on its website that lists artists who received early exposure on the platform.

A selection of artists who received early airplay on Amazing Radio
Artist	First Upload Date	First Airplay Date	Source(s)
Bastille	6 June 2011	13 June 2011	
Lianne La Havas	11 October 2011	17 October 2011	
Alt-J	9 January 2012	9 January 2012	
Haim	26 March 2012	28 March 2012	
London Grammar	13 December 2012	22 December 2012	
The 1975	12 January 2013	15 January 2013	
Royal Blood	10 February 2014	11 February 2014	
Little Simz	6 March 2014	10 March 2014	
Dua Lipa	2 September 2015	7 September 2015	
Rag'n'Bone Man	26 August 2016	26 August 2016	
Unquiet Nights	6 October 2010	1 November 2010	
Sam Fender	31 March 2017	3 April 2017	
Fontaines D.C.	6 June 2018	15 August 2018	
Wet Leg	19 November 2019	21 November 2019	

Amazing Radio has supported a large number of unsigned and independent artists across the years by giving them early airplay on the station and features on shows presented by Jim Gellatly and Shell Zenner.

== Reception ==
Amazing Radio has received media coverage for its model. The Sunday Times described it as "A revolution, the end of the closed shop," Billboard described Amazing Radio as "A powerful promotional machine... one of the A&R community's most crucial tools" and The Guardian called it "Truly the people's station".

Ireland's Hot Press noted its fresh music policy and its role as a platform for new Irish artists after its Dublin launch.

The station has also been the subject of public discussion. A 2009 forum thread on the UK website Digital Spy included users questioning the station's policies, such as its initial stance against PRS-registered artists and its public conflict with the BBC. The thread also featured direct responses purportedly from Campbell, who defended the station's model and policies.

== Presenters ==
Current presenters on Amazing Radio include Tom Robinson, who has recently come on board, Jim Gellatly and Shell Zenner. Previous notable presenters have included Bethan Elfyn, Simon Raymonde and Kathryn Tickell.
