= Uncle Dad =

- Genre: Children
- Country of origin: United Kingdom
- Original language: English
- No. of series: 1
- No. of episodes: 7

Production
- Production location: Glasgow
- Running time: 30 minutes (including adverts)
- Production company: SMG Productions

Original release
- Network: ITV (CITV)
- Release: 2005 – 2006

Uncle Dad was a children's sitcom on CITV in the UK, produced by SMG Productions and starring Tim Plester. It was announced in 2006.

== Plot ==
The show was about brothers and sisters who were forced to live with their uncle in a house full of various animals and creepy crawlies. The children stick together while dealing with their clueless uncle who wants to get rid of them. In a house that's part jungle, part zoo (and all mad), Uncle Roy (Tim Plester) and the kids battle it out to decide whose rules prevail.

== Characters ==
Justin is the oldest of the children. He's 16 and used to taking on the role of head of the family. He's not very experienced with the fairer sex, and the battle with his geeky image sometimes masks the fact he's a really nice guy.

Charlie is the rebel daughter, whose ambition is to make it as a thrash guitarist.

Anna is the tidy mother figure whose greatest dream is to be Head Prefect.

Wind-up merchant Elliot is the ginger troublemaker of the family.

Debs is the baby, but she is the wisest. She hasn't spoken since their mother died and in place of speech she expresses her feelings through drawing. She is a compulsive knitter.

== Broadcast ==
Uncle Dad was made for ITV by STV Studios (then known as "SMG Productions"). A rerun of the show began on STV's kids series wknd@stv in August 2009.
