= Wknd@stv =

2009 Scottish TV children's series

wknd@stv
- Genre: Children
- Presented by: Johnny Pender; Kim Neill
- Theme music composer: Rage Music
- Country of origin: Scotland
- Original language: English
- No. of series: 2

Production
- Production locations: STV Studios, Pacific Quay, Glasgow
- Running time: 60–180 minutes (including adverts)
- Production company: STV Studios

Original release
- Network: STV
- Release: 17 January – 20 September 2009

Related
- Weans' World (STV Glasgow/Edinburgh)

wknd@stv is a short-lived children's programming strand on Scottish television channel, STV. The block aired on Saturdays and Sundays, usually starting at 9:25 am (the first ever edition began at 9:55 am). It began on Saturday 17 January 2009 with a three-hour edition. The majority of editions were one to two hours in length.

== History ==
The first series was originally scheduled to run for twelve weeks (to Sunday 12 April 2009), but STV subsequently decided to extend the run, which eventually ended on 21 June, just before the Scottish school summer holidays. A second series of wknd@stv began on Saturday 15 August 2009; this ran for six weeks, ending on 20 September 2009.

At the time of wknd@stv launching, the ITV network was not airing children's programming on weekend mornings. A networked CITV block was reintroduced in March and April 2009 and again from September 2009; STV prioritised their own show, such that in weeks where both wknd@stv and the CITV block were running, STV would screen their strand first and timeshift the CITV block to run afterwards; if there was not room to do this then the CITV block would be omitted completely in favour of the local show. In several weeks where the structure of the ITV network schedule did not permit STV to opt out and/or timeshift networked content on Sundays, only a Saturday edition would run.

== Production ==
The links were produced in the 16:9 widescreen format. Some of the insert programming was only available in the older 4:3 format; this is cropped to be screened in the compromise 14:9 format with coloured bars at the sides of the screen to make up the difference. Shows made in 16:9 are not cropped.

The method by which the programme links were produced and broadcast – a string of programmes interlaced with 'recorded-as-live' links, clips, skits and short features – is similar to that employed by Channel 4's T4 strand.

== Weans' World ==
In 2015, STV city channels STV Glasgow and STV Edinburgh began a new children's strand, "Weans' World", which re-broadcast most of the programmes shown as part of wknd@stv. The new strand doesn't feature presenters – shows are introduced by the continuity announcer, in line with all other programmes on the channels. With the merger of the STV City channels into the singular STV2 in 2017 and subsequent closure one year later, this new strand has ceased.

== Presenters ==
The programme was presented by two Scottish teenagers, Kimberley Neill ('Kim') and Jonathon Pender ('Johnny').

Until 5 April 2009, Kim and Johnny would present on Saturdays only, with another young duo, Caitlin Murphy and Nathan Byrne, presenting on Sundays. However, from the following week Murphy and Byrne were dropped, and Kim and Johnny presented all subsequent editions. Video content recorded by Murphy and Byrne continued to be available from the programme's website following their departure.

== Programming ==
Featured programming consisted of cartoons, live-action drama/comedy and gameshows, principally archive output produced or co-produced by Scottish/Grampian (formerly SMG Productions or Scottish Television Enterprises); there was also some imported programming to which STV holds the rights, such as Flying Rhino Junior High, which STV co-produced prior to the launch of wknd@stv.

Below is a list of programmes broadcast within wknd@stv to date. Uncle Dad and Twister were not screened in the first run (January–June). Some programmes have also been aired nationally on ITV's CITV block and/or the CITV channel.

- Anatole
- The Blobs
- Butterfingers
- Captain Zed and the Zee Zone
- Dumb Bunnies
- Flying Rhino Junior High
- Get Wet
- Harry and the Wrinklies
- Hurricanes
- The Hot Rod Dogs and Cool Car Cats
- Meeow!
- Minty
- Mythic Warriors: Guardians of the Legend
- Ooops!
- On Safari
- Sherlock Holmes in the 22nd Century
- Squeak!
- Twister
- Uncle Dad
