= Scottish Television =

Television studio and ITV franchisee in Scotland, United Kingdom

STV Central
- Logo used from 2003–2006

- Type: Region of television network
- Branding: STV
- Country: United Kingdom (Scotland)
- First air date: 31 August 1957; 69 years ago
- TV transmitters: Black Hill, Craigkelly, Darvel, Torosay
- Headquarters: Glasgow
- Broadcast area: Central Scotland
- Owner: STV Group
- Dissolved: lost on-air identity on 30 May 2006 (now known as STV at all times)
- Former names: Scottish Television (1957–2006)
- Picture format: 1080i HDTV, downscaled to 16:9 576i for SDTV
- Affiliation: ITV
- Official website: www.stv.tv
- Language: English
- Replaced by: STV Central

Scottish Television (now legally known as STV Central Limited) is the ITV network franchisee for Central Scotland. The channel — the largest of the three ITV franchises in Scotland — has been in operation since 31 August 1957 and is the second-oldest franchise holder in the UK that is still active (the oldest being Granada Television).

STV Central broadcasts from studios at Pacific Quay in Glasgow and is owned and operated by STV Group (formerly SMG plc), which also owns the Northern Scotland franchise, Grampian Television (now STV North), based in Aberdeen. It produces news for the west and east halves of its transmission region (STV News at Six) along with current affairs and feature programming for Northern and Central Scotland.

Along with STV North and ITV Border, STV Central is a commercial rival to the publicly funded national broadcaster, BBC Scotland.

== History ==
Scottish Television was founded by Canadian newspaper magnate Roy Thomson (later Lord Thomson). To base the station, he bought the Theatre Royal, Glasgow from Howard & Wyndham Ltd, who became minor partners in the new venture. Thomson invited Canadian television producer Rai Purdy to become the station's first head of programming. In the months leading up to opening night, Purdy pledged that the new channel would provide "first class entertainment" and "as much cultural programming as possible" as well as allowing "Scottish talent every opportunity to develop and be seen on STV".

=== Pre-Launch ===
On 24 May 1955, a letter from the Independent Television Authority advised him that on the following Wednesday a press conference would be held in the North British Hotel, Edinburgh (which was to announce that he had been awarded the contract to set up a Scottish television company). The press release handed out at the conference stated that the transmitting station and aerials, which Thomson would have to rent from the ITA, would be ready for service in August 1957. Roy Thomson signed the contract with the ITA on 19 June 1957. The launch of a second television channel required alterations to people's television sets and/or aerials. Older sets had to be converted with an additional tuning device, and even for newer sets which had this tuner already built-in, an additional aerial was required. With nearly half a million sets and aerials in Scotland, it was going to be a huge undertaking. When independent television began in England, everybody wanted their sets converted at the same time and radio dealers could not cope with the last-minute rush. The problem was exacerbated by a shortage of radio and television mechanics. In order to avoid similar chaos in Scotland, STV (in association with the television trade) arranged a series of 21 exhibitions in the principal towns and burghs in the reception area months ahead of launch.

The Exhibitions ran from Tuesday until Friday and were open from 14:30–21:30. The admission charge was 1/- for adults, 6d for children and old age pensioners. Every visitor to the Exhibition received a free copy of a 24-page Television Guide, which gave them a colourful picture of the programmes they would see on Scottish ITV. Every set in the Exhibition showed either BBC output or the new commercial programme. The latter was relayed through closed circuit from telecine equipment housed in a specially-constructed Morris Commercial vehicle, specially constructed for the exhibitions and carrying equipment valued at over £10,000. In an adjoining hall, a cinema show was staged. This showed samples of the programmes STV would be presenting, including American attractions such as I Love Lucy, Brave Eagle, and Douglas Fairbanks Presents, as well as home-grown shows Sunday Night at the Palladium and The 64,000 Question, and advertising films. Also featured was a film of local interest, taken by STV's outside broadcasting (OB) unit a few days prior to the show, showing crowd scenes and various local activities. This offered the enticing prospect of exhibition visitors seeing themselves on television and thus finding out they were already "television stars"! The Pye OB unit, which cost £37,000 and was housed in a specially constructed vehicle, was on show outside the hall. A TV camera which was on display at the STV stand proved to be a big attraction. People standing around near the camera found that their images were being projected on screens at the other end of the hall.

Thomson said that, in initial stages, he expected to produce about ten hours a week of Scottish programmes. This was at a time when, under the terms of the Television Act, they were limited to a programme schedule of 50 hours a week. "It will certainly make the Scottish station very Scottish indeed in its programme content," he said. They planned a talent show, Fanfare; a quiz programme; a play presented once a month or each alternate month, chosen from either the Citizen's, Glasgow, the Gateway, Edinburgh, or the theatres in Perth or Dundee. There would also be a series, The Tamsons, about a Scottish family — but the problem was going to be finding someone who could write this, as not many Scots were experienced in writing for television. Scotsplay was also planned as a children's programme, while In Heaven and Earth was described by Purdy as "our big cultural effort", which would "contain a bit of anything and everything culturally interesting, provocative, or entertaining"; it would run for half an hour. British news would be featured twice a day, followed by Scottish news. In July, it was announced that the Scottish actor James Robertson Justice, a Rank Organization film star, would introduce STV's opening programme, This is Scotland.

=== 1950s ===
Scottish Television began broadcasting at 5:30 pm on Saturday 31 August 1957 with This is Scotland, an hour-long variety broadcast live from the Theatre Royal studios – STV was the seventh ITV franchise to launch, and the first outside the three largest regions (London, the Midlands and Northern England), as well as the first to broadcast seven days a week. Scottish Television's first sport-related programme was "Fanfare", which debuted on 2 September 1957, where, compered by Archie McCulloch, supporters of rival football clubs competed against one another each Monday.

=== 1960s ===
The company broadcast musical entertainment, variety, documentary films presented by Dr John Grierson, and Scottish sports coverage. It also sponsored Scottish Opera and televised live opera and ballet, networking more opera than similar television companies. Much of the station's early output was provided by ATV, under a ten-year deal worth £1 million per year. By 1965, ATV's senior producer Francis Essex had become Scottish's programming controller.

However, the station had also gained a reputation for low-budget, entertainment-driven programming. It was jokingly said that STV only owned two pieces of equipment: one telecine to show western films and another to show the commercials. Lord Thomson was also criticised, for using much of the profits generated by Scottish Television to further gain his interests in the newspaper industry, rather than reinvesting into the station.

In 1965, the chairman of the Independent Television Authority Charles Hill paid a visit to STV's Glasgow studios during which he observed an edition of the popular daytime entertainment show The One O'Clock Gang. He was so appalled by it that he personally axed the programme with the words My God, how long have you been getting away with this?.

From the launch of the station, television for schools was pioneered in association with Glasgow Corporation, and postgraduate television services were initiated, including surgery, in conjunction with universities. Programmes were devised for the emerging countries in the British Commonwealth, and the Thomson Foundation was created to educate and train television producers, journalists and engineers,this operated from Kirkhill House – a bespoke studio complex near Newton Mearns. Programmes from TFTC (Thomson Foundation Television College) were never seen by STV's viewers, but much of STV's redundant equipment found a new home at the studios, including STV's first outside broadcast unit.

Although the early days of the ITV network were a financial gamble, the STV service soon became profitable, resulting in Thomson's claim that "running a commercial television station is like having a licence to print money". In 1966, the company was listed on the London Stock Exchange for the first time.

Scottish Television retained its franchise at the first time of asking in 1967, despite strong competition from a consortium led by the future BBC Director General Alasdair Milne and strong indications that the company would lose its franchise. In the event, Lord Thomson was forced by the ITA to reduce his stake in the station from 80% to 25%, effectively ending the company's standing as a subsidiary of the Thomson Group.

The start of colour broadcasting at the end of the decade was marked by the opening of new secondary studios at the Gateway Theatre in Edinburgh in October 1969. The following month, on 3 November, the Theatre Royal headquarters were badly damaged by a major fire started by an electrical fault, in which a firefighter, Archie McLay, died after falling through a trapdoor.

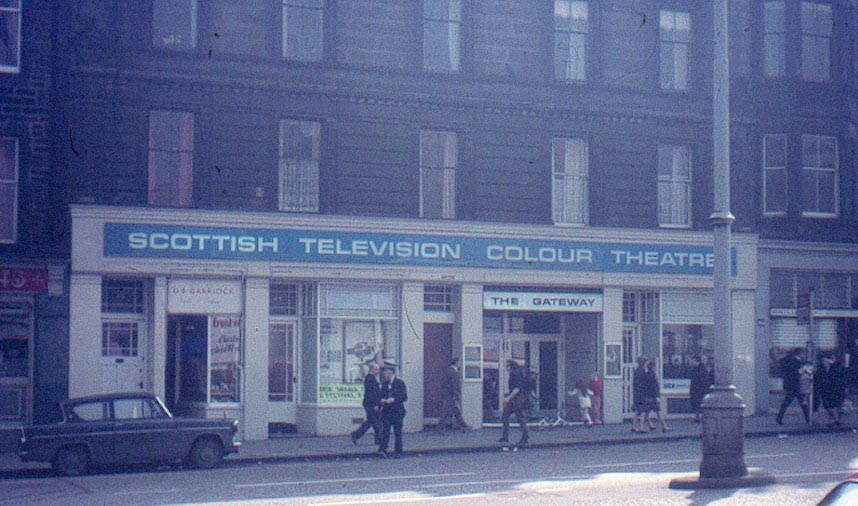
The Gateway, Leith Walk, Edinburgh (June 1974)

=== 1970s ===
Like many franchises within the ITV network, Scottish struggled through the late 1960s and early 1970s with the recession, increased transmitter rental fees, taxation on income (rather than profits), a decline in advertising revenue, and the costs of converting equipment for the launch of colour television. In 1970, the company made a loss of £39,000; a warning was given that regionalism would be abandoned, and a forced merger with Grampian Television would happen, unless the chancellor reduced the levy applied on advertising revenue.

By late 1971, STV's fortunes recovered after a change in taxation rules reducing the company's payments from £466,000 to £234,000, and a general increase in advertising saw profits rise to £475,000 within the first six months of 1971. A large proportion of the profits were spent on expanding the company's programming output. This was in part to address criticism of the station's output, and included improved sports coverage, new dramas by Scottish writers, and enhanced local entertainment.

With the increase in output, STV had expectations of becoming one of the major players in producing programming for the planned fourth UK television service (then referred to as "ITV2" and which later became Channel 4). Managing Director William Brown remarked at the time: "One of the major factors in deciding to extend our activities, is the prospect of becoming nationally involved in the production of networked programmes for ITV2 if and when it begins".

In addition, STV were also seeking to consolidate their position to increase its partnership with foreign television stations. The company was associated with a public Israeli television company, who used STV's post-production facilities for dubbing foreign language programmes. STV were hoping to be invited to act as an advisor for commercial television in Israel.

The company started work on building its new purpose-built complex at Cowcaddens, in early 1972. Original plans were to move to the Millerston area of Glasgow, costing £2 million, but negotiations fell through in mid-1960. The Cowcaddens site was planned to be built in the late 1960s, but was put on hold because of STV's financial position. The company left the Glasgow base at the Theatre Royal in December 1974.

In 1975, a short-term strike hit the ITV network in the spring, due to a dispute over the payments agreed before the government-imposed pay freeze came into force. A 19% pay rise had been agreed between the ACTT (Association of Cinematograph Television and Allied Technicians) union, and with the ITV companies in July 1974. The union alleged that £231 of this deal was still owed to its members, and should not have been affected by the pay freeze. The strike took place from 6.00 am on 23 May (except for London Weekend Television, Tyne Tees Television, and Westward Television, where ACTT members ignored the strike). At 6.00am on 26 May, when striking workers came back to work, they were locked out by management. Normal service resumed on 30 May for all ITV stations, except for Scottish Television, whose staff refused to return to work after the lockout finished on 29 May. Staff eventually returned on Monday 9 June In 1978, company profits had risen by 21.8% in the first six months of the year, allowing for an increase in local programming.

=== 1980s ===
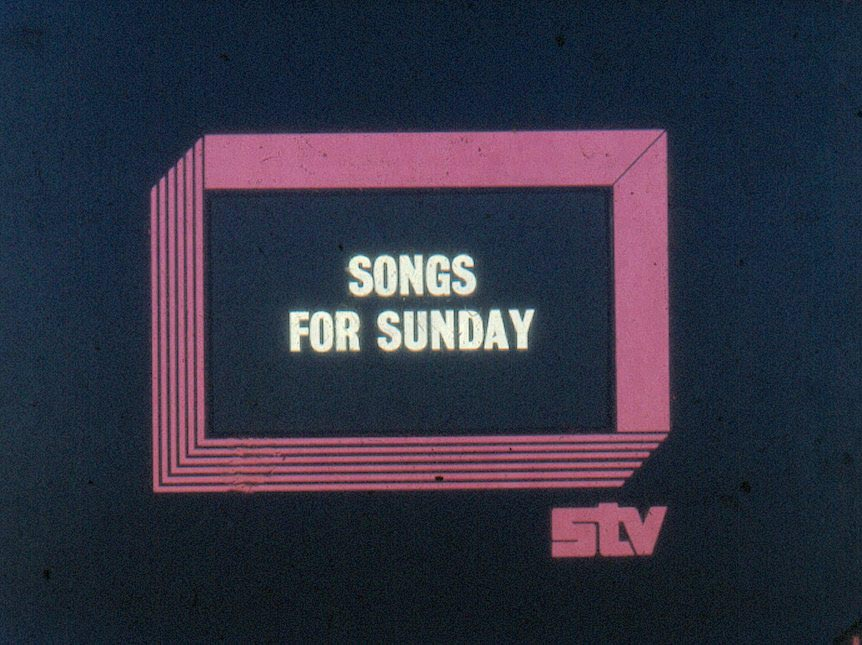
STV programme caption

During the 1970s and 1980s, Scottish Television produced a range of religious programming including weekly church services, half-hour religious programmes on a Sunday, religious contributions to the new Channel 4, the epilogue Late Call, and occasional documentaries, produced by Executive Producer Rev. Dr Nelson Gray, a Minister of the Congregational Church, and Rev. Eric Hudson, a Minister of the Church of Scotland but as the public service broadcasting requirement receded during the 1990s, the amount of religious programmes were gradually phased out.

In October 1981, Scottish Television became the first ITV station to operate a regional Oracle teletext service, containing over 60 pages of local news, sport and information.

As was industry-practice at the time, STV programming would either be totally studio-based, include film inserts where required (the local news programme Scotland Today and Take the High Road being early examples of this), or other programming such as documentaries and dramas, shot entirely on film. The company employed up to six film crews who could be assigned to providing daily local news coverage, football matches, or feature programming such as Redgauntlet or Weirs Way. Since the company originally went on air, images not provided electronically 'live' within the studio centre were provided via telecine machines, allowing the station to run local advertisements to fill the ad breaks within and on either side of local and networked programming. Local advertisements – where a single image was shown on screen whilst the continuity announcer read the promotional message 'live' – was sourced from a standard 35 mm slide.

Scottish television logo between 1985 and 1989

Filmed inserts into regional news added a significant delay to the airing of programmes. STV, having no film processing capability of its own at Cowcaddens, sub-contracted this to a specialist company – Humphries Film Laboratories. Exposed film would be rushed to an industrial unit in North Glasgow to be processed and returned to Cowcaddens for the 16 mm film to be edited and prepared for transmission. This process often caused much annoyance to reporters and crews alike, as to ensure inclusion of a breaking news story for Scotland Today, film had to reach the labs no later than 4.30 pm. By the early to mid-1980s, STV had followed the rest of the ITV network in dispensing with film and embracing electronic news gathering, with Sony's Betacam being the chosen system.

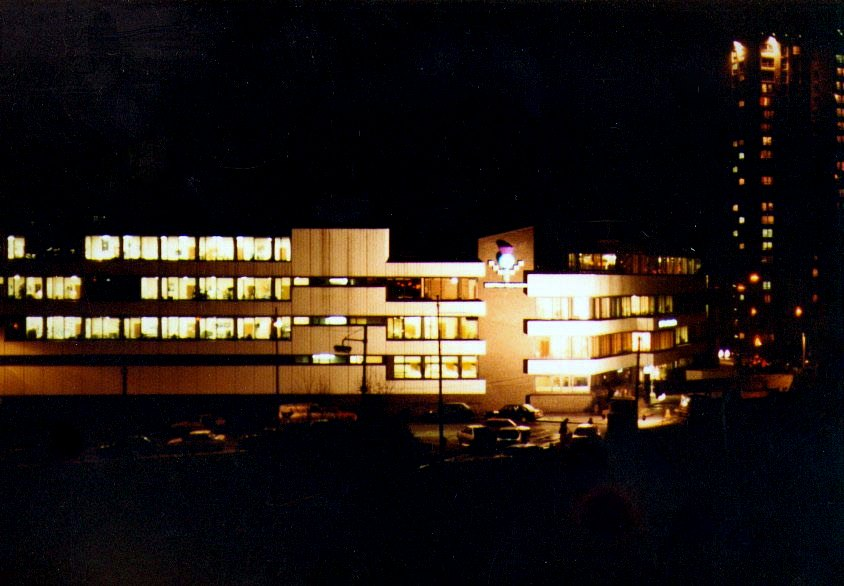
Scottish Television's Cowcaddens HQ, 1987

Gus Macdonald became the station's Director of Programmes during the summer of 1986. One of his first decisions was to revamp the station's regional news and features output, following criticism from an Independent Broadcasting Authority committee. Scottish's flagship evening programme Scotland Today had previously been revamped from a regional news programme into a topical magazine show supplemented by short bulletins. David Scott was brought in from BBC Scotland as the station's head of news and reverted Scotland Today back to a hard news format while long-running series including What's Your Problem? and Ways & Means were axed. Replacement programmes included the topical lunchtime show Live at One Thirty and social action series Scottish Action.

Throughout the 1980s, the company began gaining greater access to the national network, primarily through the soap opera Take the High Road and the long-running detective series Taggart, as well as programming for Channel 4. Towards the end of the decade, game shows Wheel of Fortune and Fun House began decade-long runs on the ITV network. During the late 1980s, the company, known as MAC III Productions, bought out the rights to game shows for the UK and foreign markets, including The Krypton Factor.

=== 1990s ===
In 1990, Sir William Brown retired as managing director after 24 years of service, marking the longest serving chief executive in ITV history. He subsequently became chairman of Scottish Television plc from 1991 until 1996 Gus Macdonald was promoted as managing director and started overhauling the workforce by cutting it from 800 to 330 – Macdonald claimed the company was employing many more people though most were now freelancers.

In early 1992, J. Nigel Pickard became controller of entertainment and drama features. When he transferred from the outgoing ITV company TVS, some of the station's children's programmes continued production under Scottish Television including Art Attack and How 2. Pickard was based at an office in Maidstone (where many of Scottish's new acquisitions were produced) until 1995, but he left the company in 1993. Scottish would continue as a major provider of children's programming throughout the 1990s, including a number of co-productions with other broadcasters and production companies.

After retaining its franchise in 1991 unopposed with a bid of just £2,000 a year (just over £5 a day), plus 2% of their annual advertising revenue, STV's production arm was placed into a separate company, Scottish Television Enterprises. The company invested shares in various ITV companies and media firms, including a 25% stake in GMTV as part of a consortium for the ITV breakfast franchise (STV's stake was sold off to ITV plc in 2004 for £31 million), ITN and UTV, which helped push profits up to £10m. The company itself acquired new investors when in 1994 the Mirror Group brought 20% stake in company, In September 1995, STV acquired a 20% stake in HTV worth £36 million, as part of a deal with Flextech, which held a 20% stake while the Mirror Group stake was diluted to 16%. The deal also involved Mirror Group CEO David Montgomery and two Flextech executives joining the Scottish Television board, while Flextech committed to licensing more than 125 hours of drama and documentaries from STV. Within a month of the deal, the Mirror Group increased its stake to 19.93%.

In 1996, the HTV shares were sold off to the Wales and West contractor's future owners United News and Media. For a short time, STV became a buyout target for Yorkshire Television. STV acquired Caledonian Publishing - then-publishers of The Herald and the Glasgow Evening Times - in July 1996. The following June, Scottish Media Group plc acquired Grampian Television, the ITV contractor for Northern Scotland, for £105 million. Shortly afterwards, the company became SMG.

In April 1998, Scottish formed a new partnership with Canadian entertainment company Nelvana and American TV network CBS to produce six new animated series, with Scottish having a significant creative input in the production of all their shows. Scottish Television Enterprises general manager Darrel James, who oversaw the deal, said: "[It] came together in a surprisingly short time. We have worked very successfully with Nelvana on the Rupert series in the past. So when they came and asked us if we wanted to get involved, we said 'yes' almost immediately. It is not often that you get the opportunity to work on such a high volume of co-produced material at one time." The new shows produced were Franklin, Anatole, The Dumb Bunnies, Flying Rhino Junior High, Mythic Warriors: Guardians of the Legend and Birdz. In November, Scottish doubled the funding for children's programming.

Speculation followed in the summer of 1998 that STV's 20% stake in GMTV would be sold off to help raise cash for new acquisitions in England, since the company continued to have no debt and could easily afford new purchases. At the end of the year, Gus Macdonald left the company to become a Scottish Trade Minister. In 1999, Mirror Group sold its stake to Granada

=== 2000s ===
On 2 March 2006, it was announced by SMG plc (now 'STV Group plc') that Scottish Television would revert to the brand name of 'STV', used from the start of colour broadcasting in 1969 until 30 August 1985, and which the station was still informally known as. At the same time, Grampian Television would also become known as STV North. The new-look branding was launched on 30 May 2006.

In January 2007, the station launched separate news services for the East and West of the STV Central region, initially as a five-minute opt out within the 6:00pm edition of Scotland Today on weeknights.

== Studios ==
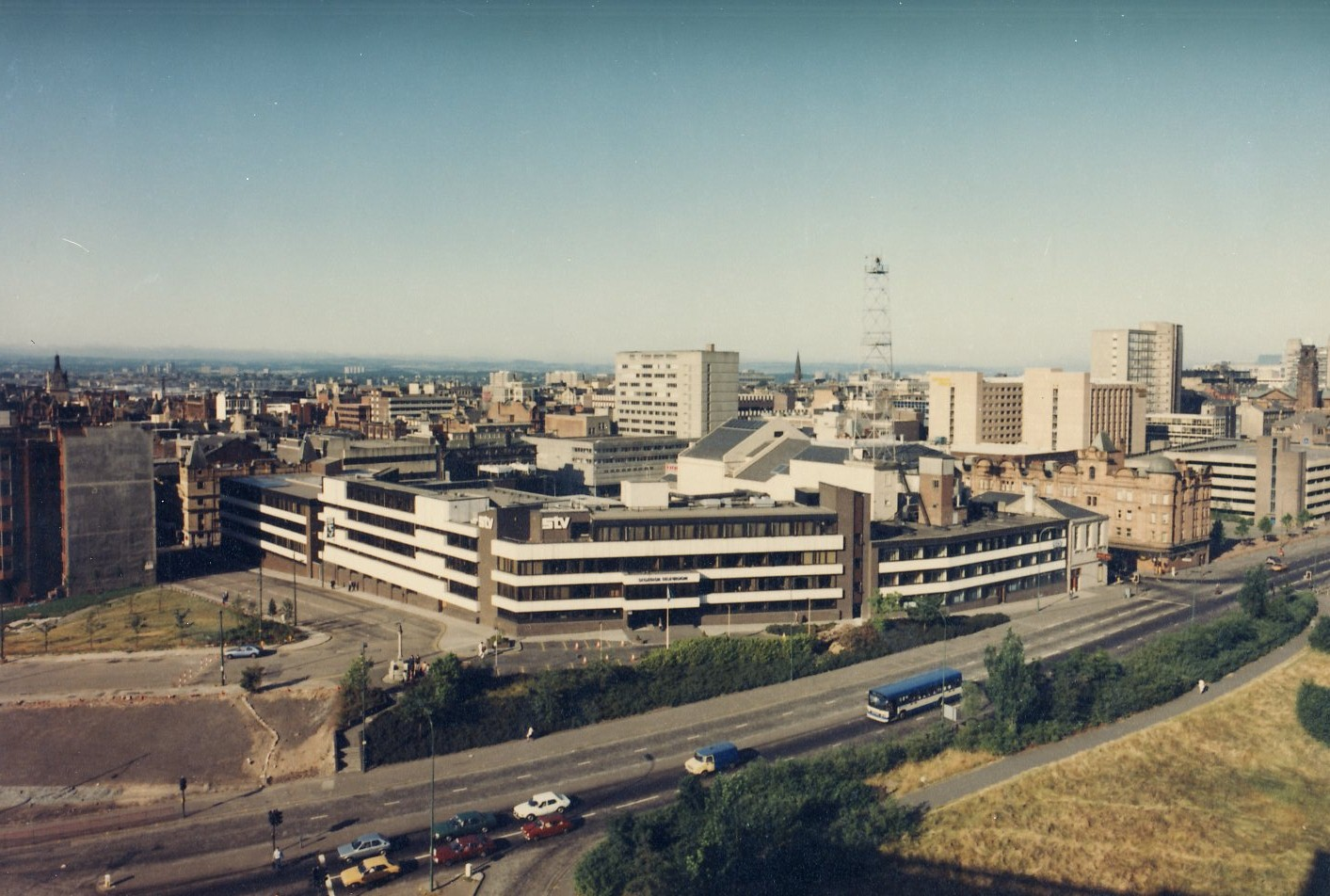
STV's former Cowcaddens headquarters

STV's Pacific Quay headquarters

From the station's launch in 1957 until 1974, Scottish Television used the Theatre Royal, Glasgow on Hope Street as their main studio base and headquarters. Secondary studios at the Gateway Theatre on Leith Walk in Edinburgh were built in 1969 to accommodate more productions. The new facilities at Edinburgh grew in importance following the fatal Theatre Royal fire in November 1969, which gutted Studio A and several production suites.

Scottish's main base moved in 1974 to custom built facilities on Renfield Street in Cowcaddens on land opposite the Theatre Royal site. Construction began on the new base in 1972 - it was officially opened on 12 December 1974 by Princess Alexandra, and expanded to accommodate further production in 1978. Following the completion of the new studio complex, the Theatre Royal was sold to Scottish Opera to become the first national opera house in Scotland, and the home of Scottish Opera and Scottish Ballet.

Cowcaddens became Scottish's main studio base where the majority of their productions were based. However, with the growing use of independent production companies as a source of programming, the need for increased studio space was alleviated. New Scottish programming, such as Art Attack and How 2 from TVS was being made at the Maidstone Studios, where these programmes were formally based. As a cost-saving measure, the Gateway Theatre studios in Edinburgh, which for a time became the permanent studio home for Take the High Road, were closed in 1994.

In 2006, the newly rebranded STV moved from their Cowcaddens base to a new, smaller building at Pacific Quay alongside the headquarters of BBC Scotland. As a result of the move, the entire Cowcaddens site, with the exception of an extension containing The Herald and Glasgow Evening Times newspapers, was demolished and redeveloped in 2007. STV's Edinburgh operations are now based at small studios in Fountainbridge.

== Presentation ==
Scottish Television ident 1985–1988

Scottish Television ident, January 1989–1992

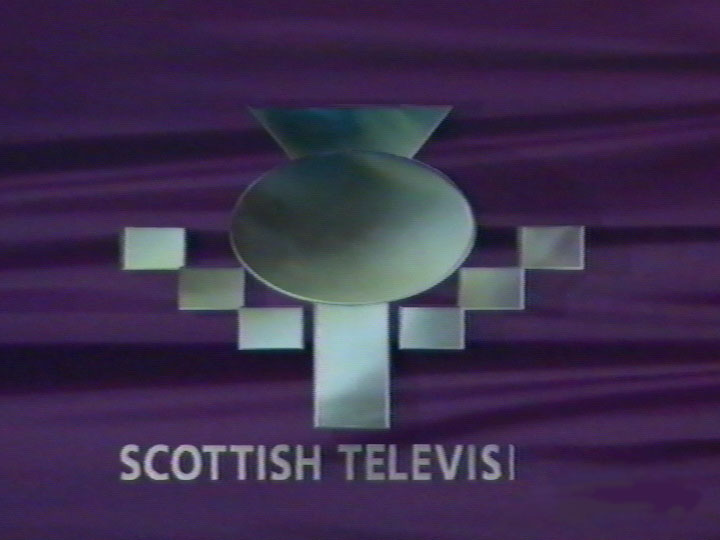
Scottish Television ident 1993–1996

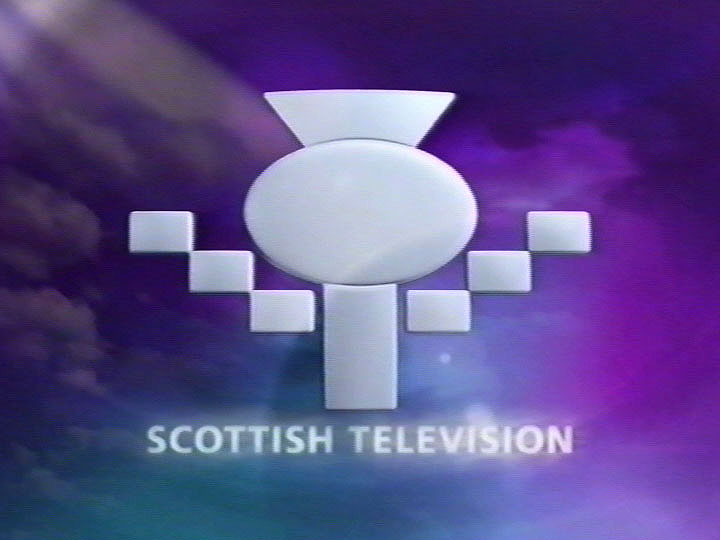
Scottish Television ident 1996–2000

Scottish Television's first on-air symbol featured the Lion Rampant of Scotland. Initially a static caption, an animated ident was introduced by 1965 in which the lion would spin inside a box, though this later modified as a simple zoom in following, according to some reports, a complaint from The Lord Lyon King of Arms, the man in charge of protecting Scotland's heraldry. The station's first theme was a specially composed piece by Geraldo entitled Scotlandia, which began each day's broadcasting – the theme continued to be heard until August 1985.

On 8 April 1971, shortly after the commencement of colour broadcasting, the lion was replaced by a stylised 'STV' logo. The solid STV lettering would be met by an outline of the lettering and the background would turn blue once both had met, accompanied by a trumpet arrangement of 'Hey, Johnnie Cope, Are Ye Waking Yet?' Throughout the 1970s and up until 1985, this stylised STV was used as either a static caption, or form up from a patterned design that was supposed to represent tartan. Accompanying the look was a clock against a blue background with the white STV logo forming a pattern across the screen.

On 31 August 1985, the station revived the 'Scottish Television' branding and introduced a computer generated thistle ident designed by Peter Goodfellow. Occasional special idents were also produced including a modified logo to mark the station's 30th anniversary in 1987, while the main ident was largely replaced in January 1988 in favour of a new set of seasonal and themed idents, but the 1985 clock was kept in use. The thistle logo was modified on 1 January 1989 to create a 2D identity which would remain in use until 27 February 2000, under various guises. Glasgow-based animation company Liquid Image, working with the Scottish Television in-house design department, created the station's presentation packages in the 90s, first appearing on 1 January 1993 and 6 October 1996 respectively. Scottish did use the first national ITV ident from 1 September 1989, but used it in conjunction with its own branding: however, this was dropped by early 1990.

Scottish maintained in-vision continuity throughout its first thirty years on air. In later years, the station relied less on in-vision links compared to other ITV stations, although duty announcers also presented short regional news bulletins produced by the Scotland Today newsroom. In-vision continuity was confined to overnight junctions in February 1988 following the launch of 24-hour broadcasting and the start of the Scottish Through the Night service. The practice was abandoned in October 1991, when the overnight strand was relaunched as Scottish Night Time.

Scottish refused to adopt the 1999 ITV generic look and instead, alongside Grampian Television, launched a new on-screen logo on 28 February 2000, featuring a blue square with the words 'Scottish TV' – a new set of 15 ident sequences featuring Scottish people and places was produced as part of the revamp. The presentation package remained in use until 6 January 2003, when Scottish and Grampian adopted the celebrity idents package, albeit with their own logos attached and also featuring Scottish and Grampian presenters.

The celebrity look remained until 2006, when the Scottish and Grampian names were traded in for one unified look: STV. The first ident package featured an elongated blue 'S', with scenes of Scottish people in various locations passing around the 'S' from person to person in differing scenes, until one person places the S in the centre of the screen. An updated look was introduced on 23 March 2009, consisting of a picture postcard scene which would flip over to the right to reveal another theme. This flipping increases in pace and as the camera pulls back before the STV logo forms against a gradient blue background.

On 2 June 2014, STV's logo was unified, along with Grampian's. The white "tv" is now situated on a gradient blue triangle, and three light blue curves now appear on the 3 sides. The "S"' colours was changed to gradient light blue.

== Programmes ==
A list of programmes made by Scottish Television. All programmes, except regional ones, now come under the banner of STV Studios.

=== News ===
- Dateline (1960s–1973)
- Here and Now
- Scotland Now
- Scotland Today (1972–2009)
- Scotland This Week
- STV News Review (signed news review, 2006–2013)
- STV News at Six (2009–present)

=== Current affairs ===
- As I Please (1984)
- Box 2000
- Platform (1996–2004)
- Politics Now (2004–2011)
- From the Top (1976–1979)
- The Lion's Share (1974–1975)
- Reid About...USSR/Poland/Scotland (1988–1990)
- Question in Sport (1990s)
- Scottish Assembly (1986–1989)
- (Scottish) Report (1970–1988)
- Scotland Friday (1970s–1975)
- Scotland Today Reports (1972–1977)
- Scotland Today Special (1987–2005)
- The Scottish 500
- Scottish Frontiers on Medicine (1988–1992)
- Scottish Questions (1986–1996)
- (Scottish) Reporters (1993–2000)
- Seven Days (1998–2004)
- Sunday Live (2006)
- Ways and Means (1975–1986)
- The Week in Politics (2000–2004)

=== Sport ===
- Champions League Live (1992–2015)
- Extra Time (1988–2000)
- Football First (1999–2002)
- Scotsport (1957–2008)
- Touchdown Scotland (1997–2000)

=== Features and documentaries ===
- 7.30 for 8
- A Ship from the Clyde (1960s)
- Action Line (1979–1987)
- Acropolis Now (1986–1987)
- All Kinds of A Country (1983–1986)
- Around 17 (1994)
- Artery (1998–2003)
- Bill Tennent Travels High Road (1970s)
- The Bowler and the Bunnet (1967)
- Britain: The Nazi Safe House (1987)
- Club Reps (2001–2004)
- Celtic America
- Crime Desk (1975–1988)
- Contract 736 (1967)
- Dirt Detective (1993)
- Down to Earth (1980–1982)
- Feeling better? (1986)
- Fit to Last (1976)
- From the Top (1979)
- Education for Tomorrow (1980s)
- The Edge of Land (1995–1996)
- Encore for The Arts (1979–1984)
- Enterprise 64 (1964)
- Get It On
- Green Pages (1992)
- Home for the Holidays
- Homelands
- The Home Show (1994–2004)
- House Call (1973–1976)
- Home and School (1979)
- Homework (1984)
- Hooked on Scottish (1996–2000)
- Kay's Originals (1989)
- Kirsty (1993–1996)
- Live At One Thirty (1986–1987)
- Meet Paul Coia (1981)
- The Maverick Millionaire (1986)
- Moneywise (1976–1982)
- Moviejuice (2000–present)
- The Munro Show (1990–1992)
- Natural Born Winners?
- NB (1989–1997)
- The Nightshift (2010–2015)
- Off The Page (1989–1992)
- Once Upon Upon A Song (1987)
- One in a Hundred (1981)
- Out and About (1987)
- Paramedics (1993)
- Painting In Scotland (1972)
- The Point
- Positively Unemployed (1984–1985)
- Rescue (1990)
- Room at the Top/Summer at the Top (2000–2001)
- Safe as Houses (2007)
- Sea Kingdoms (2003)
- Scotching the Myth (1990)
- Scotland's Story (1984)
- Scottish Action (1987–2002)
- Scottish Books (1988–1995)
- Scottish Eye (1988–1992)
- Scottish Minute
- Scottish Men (1995–1998)
- Scottish Passport (1993–2004; 2012–present)
- Scottish Women (1989–1998)
- Secret Scotland
- Songs of Scotland (1973–1980s)
- Square Meals (1994–1998)
- Studio (1983–1986)
- Studio A Startime (1970's)
- Summer Discovery (1999)
- The Talent
- Talking Scotland (2005–2007)
- The Real Mackay (for stv.tv, 2007–2011)
- The Strange Show (1995)
- This Scotland
- This Wonderful World (1957–1960s)
- Time Out with Tennent (1965)
- Trial by Night (1993–2000)
- Trout 'n' About
- Votes for Women (1988)
- Weir's Way (1976–1987)
- Wilkies in Winter (1979)
- What's Your Problem? (1976–1986)
- Watch This Space (1976–1977)
- Wheel Nuts (1997–2002)
- World Worth Keeping (1975–1984)
- Yorkhill

=== Entertainment ===
- A Game of Two Halves (1995–1997)
- All Kinds Of Country (1983–1985)
- Alastair: One Man and His Band (1981)
- The Adventures of Francie and Josie (1962–1965)
- The Alexander Brothers Show (1960s–1976)
- Alec Finlay Show (1959)
- The Allan Stewart Show (1982)
- The Allan Stewart Tapes (1979)
- Aly Bain and Friends (1987–1990)
- The Andy Stewart Show (1970s)
- Battle of the Comics (1976–1977)
- Boiling Point
- Boxed Set (1998–2001)
- Burn Your Bills (2005)
- The Business Game (1992–1997)
- The Better Sex (1978)
- Chart Bite (1994–1996)
- Club Cupid (co-produced with STV North, 2006)
- Connolly (1970s)
- Dance Party Roof (1957-1960s)
- Devine Country
- Did You See Una? (1967–1968)
- Do You Come Here Often? (1979)
- Funny You Should Say That (1984–1986)
- Funny Farm/Comedy Rules (1990–1994)
- The Golf Club (1997)
- Elaine: The Singer of the Song (1976–1979)
- Hear Here/The Sound Of (1979–1984)
- Hello, Good Evening and Welcome (1976-1979)
- Highland Showboat (1976)
- In Concert (1977–1986)
- Its Andy Cameron (1984)
- Jazz Concert
- Jazz at the Gateway
- The Jazz Series (1978-1981)
- Jazz Club
- Jigtime (1957–1959)
- The Ken Fine Show (1995–1998)
- Kenneth Mckellar at Home (1970s)
- The Larry Marshall Show (1960s)
- Larry Looks Lightly (1975–1976)
- Late Edition (1995–1996)
- Live at the Fringe
- The Music People (1967)
- Night Flyte (1989–1992)
- Nippy Sweeties (1986)
- Now You See It (1981–1986)
- The One O'Clock Gang (1958 – 31 December 1964)
- Over to Una (early 1960s – 1969)
- Passport Quiz (1998–2002)
- Postcode Challenge (2007–2011)
- Rikki (1966)
- The Rikki Fulton Hour (1965)
- Round Up (1960s)
- Scotch Corner (1972–1976)
- The Scottish Home Service/Viv on Sunday (early 1990s)
- Shindig (1986–1988) Hosted By Sydney Devine
- Split Second (1988)
- Star Parade (1980–1985)
- The Stanley Baxter Scots Picture Show (1st Jan 1974)
- Steve Jones Illustrated/It's Friday and I'm Steve Jones (1978–1979)
- The Steve Jones Programme (1980)
- Studio Downbeat (1960s)
- Studio One (co-produced with Border TV, 1985)
- The Sydney Devine Show (1970s)
- Talking Scots (1979–1983)
- The Terry Neason Show (1987)
- Thingummyjig (1976–1983)
- This is Scotland (First programme broadcast on STV, 31 August 1957)
- Wheel of Fortune (1988–2001)
- Victor and Barry... (1987–1989)
- The VJ's (1996)
- Whigmaleerie (1962)
- Win, Lose or Draw (1990–1998)
- Would You Believe It (late 1970s)

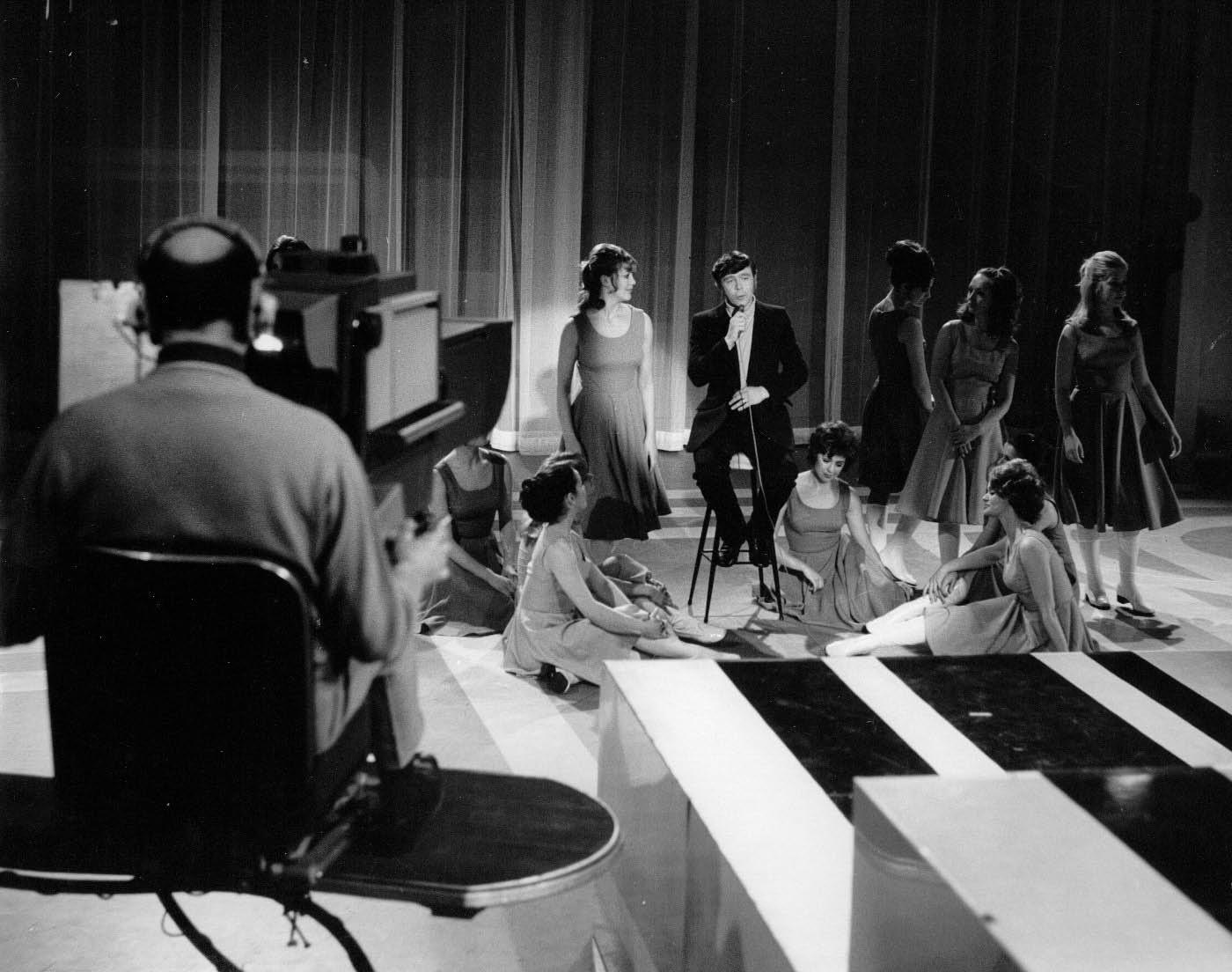
The Andy Stewart Show (Gateway)

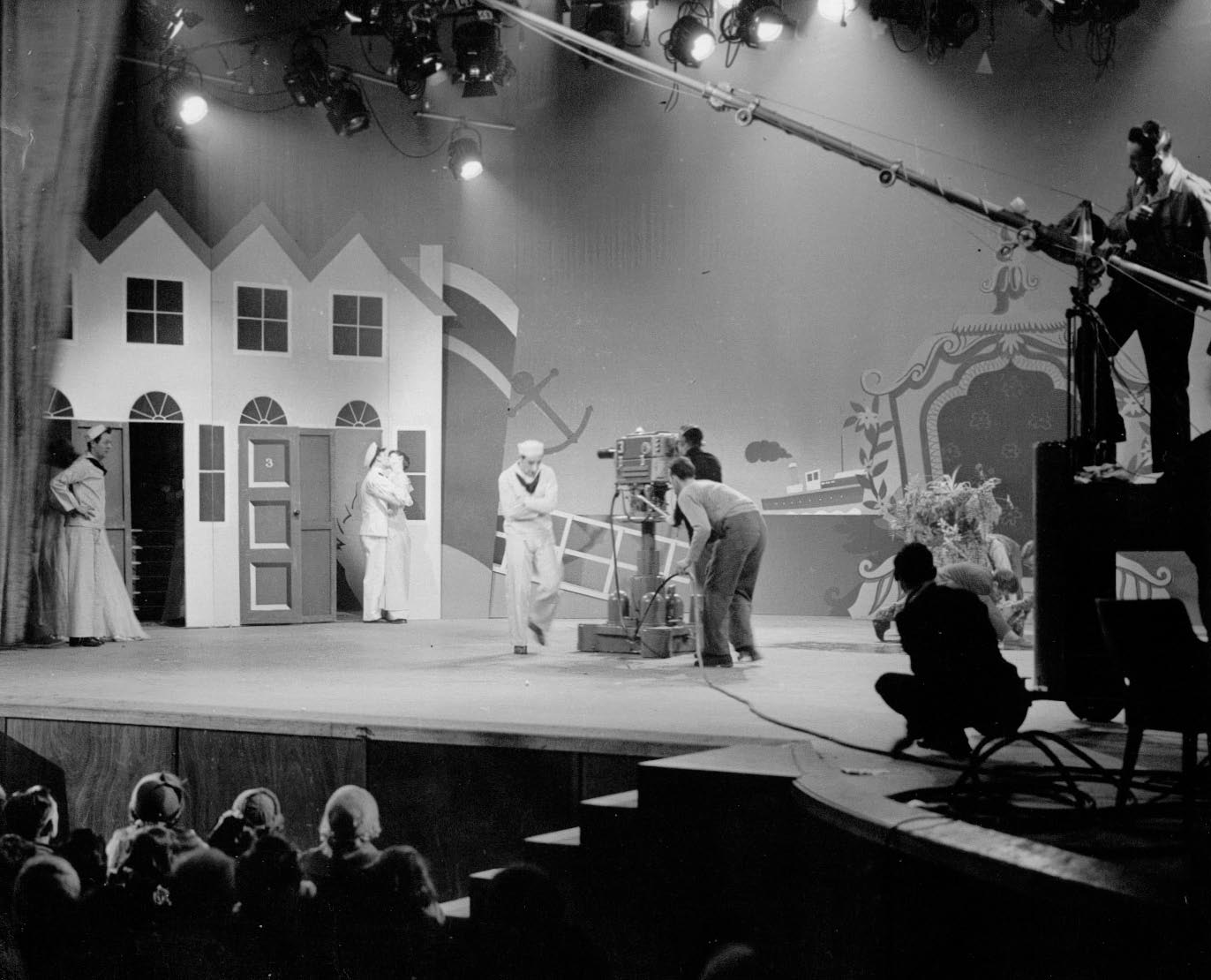
The Larry Marshall Show (Studio A)

=== Drama ===
- "2%" (1982)
- A Sense of Freedom
- The Advocates (1991–1992)
- Albert and the Lion (1989)
- Blue Christmas 1994
- Bookie (1983)
- Bookie (1988)
- The Campbells (1986–1990)
- Charles Endell Esquire (1979)
- City Sugar (1978)
- Comfort and Joy (1984)
- Cracked (2008)
- Doctor Finlay (1993–1996)
- The Flight of the Heron (1960s)
- Hess (1988)
- High Living (1968–1971)
- High Times (2004, 2008)
- The House on the Hill (1981)
- Garnock Way (1976–1979)
- Markheim (1974)
- McCallum (1995–1998)
- Missing (2006)
- New Found Land (co-produced with Grampian Television)
- New Found Films (co-produced with Grampian Television)
- Northern Lights (1982)
- Out in The Open (1984)
- Preview (1980-1994)
- The Prime of Miss Jean Brodie (1978)
- The Old Music Master (1982)
- The Queen of Scots (1967)
- Red Gauntlet (1960s)
- Rebus (2000–2007)
- Scenes Like These (1976)
- Seesaw (1998)
- Short Story (1972-3)
- Skin Deep (1982)
- The Spaver Connection (1984)
- The Stalker's Apprentice (1998)
- The Steamie (1988)
- Taggart (1983–2010)
- Take the High Road (1980–2003)
- Winners and Losers (1989)

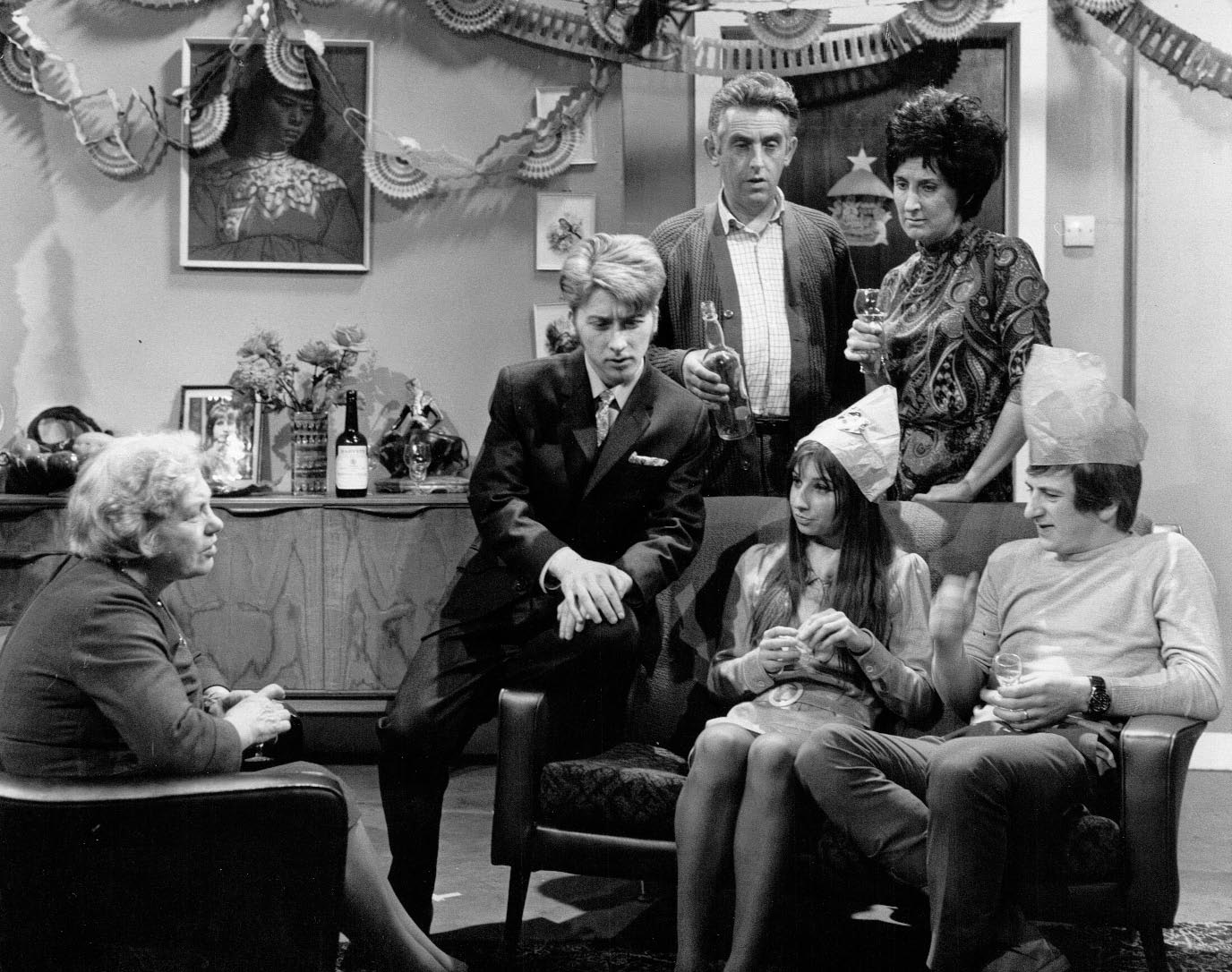
On the set of High Living

=== Children's/Animation ===
- Art Attack (1993–2007; earlier series produced by TVS)
- Animal Fanatics
- Animates (1999)
- Anatole (co-produced with Nelvana and CBS)
- Birdz (co-produced with Nelvana and CBS)
- Butterfingers
- Captain Zed and the Zee Zone (co-produced with DIC Animation City, 1991)
- The Caribou Kitchen (co-produced with Ealing Animation / Maddocks Cartoon Productions / World Productions, 1995-1998)
- Curly and Coconut (1976)
- The Disney Club (co-produced with Buena Vista Productions, 1989–1998)
- Dramarama
- The Dinah Saur Show (1978)
- Dumb Bunnies (co-produced with Nelvana and CBS)
- Fun House (1989–1999)
- Get Wet (1997–1998)
- Glen Michael's Cartoon Cavalcade (1966–1992)
- Finders Keepers (1993–1996; earlier series produced by TVS)
- Flying Rhino Junior High (co-produced with Nelvana and CBS)
- Harry and the Wrinklies (1999–2002)
- How 2 (1993–2006; earlier series produced by TVS)
- I Don't Believe It (1998)
- It's Not Just Saturday ( 1996)
- Ice Cream Machine (for Channel 5, 2004)
- The Hot Rod Dogs and Cool Car Cats
- Hurricanes (1993–1997) (co-produced with DIC Productions L.P.)
- Inside Out (2000)
- Letter Go Round (2000–2002)
- The Magic House (1993–1995)
- The Magic Pencil
- Mythic Warriors: Guardians of the Legend (co-produced with Nelvana and CBS)
- Minty's Double (1998)
- Meeow!
- On Safari (2000)
- Our house (1997)
- Prove It! (co-produced with GeronimoTV, 2005–2007)
- Red Amber Green (1996–1999)
- Rex the Dog (1976)
- Rupert (Co-produced with Nelvana, 1992–1997)
- Roundup
- Seumus (1985-1986)
- Skoosh (1994–1998)
- Shadow of the Stone (1987)
- Sherlock Holmes in the 22nd Century (co-produced with DIC Productions L.P. and Les Studios Tex, 1999-2001)
- Snug and Cozi (1996–1997)
- Squeak! (2003-2004)
- Stookie (1986)
- T.I.G.S (1995)
- Tales of Toodlebye (2001)
- The Blobs (co-produced with S4C)
- The Magic House (1994-1996)
- Twister (2001)
- Uncle Dad
- Upstairs Downstairs Bears (co-produced with CINAR; 1998–1999)
- Walter Melon (co-produced with Saban Entertainment and Saban International Paris; 1998–1999)
- What's Up Doc (1993–1995; earlier series produced by TVS)
- Wolf It (1993–1996)
- wknd@stv (2009)
- Wemyss Bay 902101

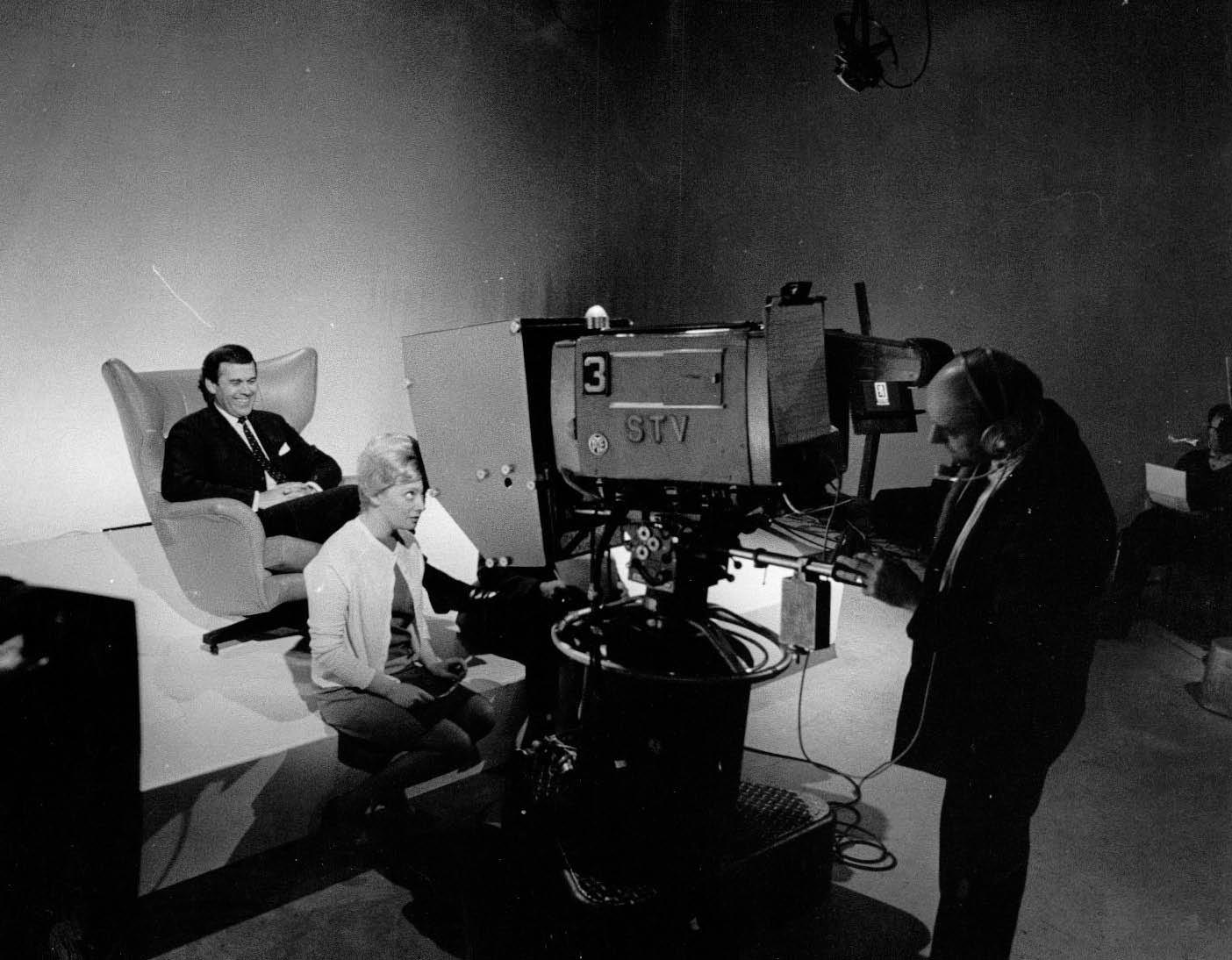
On the set of Cartoon Cavalcade with Glen Michael

=== Religion ===
- By The Way (1980-1985)
- Chapter and Verse (1975–1985)
- Eikon (1993–2003)
- Eye to Eye
- God's Rep (1990)
- Gods and Heroes in Ancient Tales (1987)
- Highway (contributions to the ITV network)
- Late Call (1960–1989)
- Morning Worship (contribution to the ITV network)
- No Easy Answer (1978–1986)
- Seek the Truth
- Sunday Service
- Tell The Story (1980-1988)
- The Divine Truth (1979)
- That's the Spirit (1978–1985)

=== Scots Gaelic ===
- About Gaelic (1979–1986)
- Abair Spors (1992-1994)
- Air An Urlar (Music)
- Air A Bhord (Features)
- Air A Charraig (1990s)
- Air an Spot (Quiz)
- 1 2 Stri (Children's)
- Beachd (Features)
- Bilidh Bio Dach (1996)
- Cairt Turais (Features)
- Carlas (Features)
- Dein Fhein E! (DIY 1992)
- De Tha Seo? (1990–1994)
- Ealadairean (Documentary)
- Failte (Features)
- Feis nan Coisir (1996)
- Iomraiteach (Documentary)
- Iomall nan Tonn (Documentary)
- Haggis Agus (1990–1993)
- Machair (Drama)
- Mactalla (discussion programme)
- Nochd Gun Chadal (Music)
- Reoiteag Air Rothan (2004)
- Speaking our Language (Learners)
- Seachd Laithean (Current affairs, 1979–1982)
- Sin Agad E! (Magazine programme)
- Blas Na Gaedhlig/Sounds Gaelic (1980-1986)
- Seall (1991-1999)
- Sploaid (Children's)
- The Sabhal Mor Ostaig Lecture
- Trang Trang (Children's) (1984–1992)
- Tiglinn Na Cagatile (1991)

ITV regional service
| New service | Central Scotland; 31 August 1957 – present | Current provider as STV Central |
