= Club Cupid =

Scottish regional dating show

- Genre: Dating
- Presented by: Des Clarke, Michelle Watt
- Country of origin: Scotland
- No. of series: 1
- No. of episodes: 10

Production
- Running time: 60 minutes (including adverts)
- Production company: STV Studios

Original release
- Network: STV
- Release: 26 October – 28 December 2006

Club Cupid is a Scottish regional dating show co-produced by STV Central and STV North and presented by Des Clarke and Michelle Watt. The series was recorded at the Apex Hotel in Dundee.

In each episode, one man and woman were given the chance to speed date five hopefuls with the potential of finding true love, becoming soulmates or new friends. The Love Doctor, Dr Gareth Smith, provided advice and guidance to the participants and analysis on the participants' behaviour and strategies.
