= Timeline of Jazz FM (UK) =

A timeline of notable events relating to Jazz FM, a radio station in the United Kingdom, and its predecessors 102.2 Jazz FM and 100.4 Jazz FM.

== 1990s ==
1990

- 4 March – Jazz FM, a station playing mainly soul and jazz music, launches in London with an Ella Fitzgerald concert at the Royal Albert Hall.

1991

- February – Gilles Peterson is fired after playing peace songs on-air and encouraging listeners to attend an anti-war march during the Gulf War.

1992

- No events.

1993

- July – Jazz FM's licence is put up for renewal by the Radio Authority. As well as Jazz FM, there is a bid for the licence from Euro Jazz London, which includes ex-Jazz FM employees.
- September – Jazz FM retained its licence to broadcast.

1994

- 9 May – Jazz FM is changed to JFM in order to appeal to more listeners who may have been put off by the name "jazz", and who thoink that Jazz FM only plays jazz records. The station spends £500,000 on publicising the name change.
- 1 September – 100.4 Jazz FM is launched in Manchester as 100.4 JFM.

1995

- Richard Wheatly is appointed as Jazz FM's chief executive officer to revive the station, which has three months cash remaining in the bank. Golden Rose Communications was floated on the stock exchange in the early part of 1995. Wheatly subsequently sells sister station Viva AM which was losing £100,000 a month before the sale for £3 million to Mohamed Al-Fayed as part of his cost-cutting plans.
- Autumn – JFM is rebranded back to Jazz FM after Wheatley asks the Radio Authority for permission to change the station's name. The change back to Jazz FM is reported to have cost £900,000.

1996

- No events.

1997

- No events.

1998

- No events.

1999

- No events.

== 2000s ==
2000

- 7 June – Jazz FM launches ejazz.fm, on 7 June 2000 a website focused on the wide genre of jazz and including free and subscription based jazz content as well as two continuous jazz music streams for uptempo and downtempo jazz. The website is designed by the DDW agency. Club ejazz for a subscription of £5 a month allows listeners to listen to exclusive one-hour specialist shows from Jazz FM presenters as well as live and recorded concert material.

2001

- No events.

2002

- 6 June – The Jazz FM stations are purchased by the Guardian Media Group, and subsequently become part of the company's radio division, GMG Radio Holdings Ltd. 100.4 Jazz FM is closed and rebranded the following year.

2003

- GMG Radio conducts market research into the type of music that listeners in the north-west of England want to hear on the radio. The study concludes that many people are dissuaded by the name Jazz.

2004

- 10 February – Dave Lincoln, a well-known radio personality in Northwest England, and former Radio 1 presenter Andy Peebles will head the line-up when 100.4 Jazz FM is relaunched as 100.4 Smooth FM in March.
- 13 February – 100.4 Jazz FM closes ahead of its relaunch.
- 1 March – 100.4 Jazz FM is relaunched as 100.4 Smooth FM.
- 12 July – The Guardian Media Group relaunches the ejazz.fm website. The site includes more than 200 specially commissioned programmes, with five new programmes being added each month from Jazz FM's presenters such as Sarah Ward, the late Campbell Burnap and Peter Young, as well as jazz news and features, including the ejazz.fm artist of the month. The subscription fee for Club ejazz is dropped but user registration remains.

2005

- 14 February – GMG Radio confirms plans to rebrand 102.2 Jazz FM in London with the Smooth name after being given permission to do so by Ofcom. As part of the changes, Smooth has committed to continue to play 45 hours of jazz content each week.
- 27 May – 102.2 Jazz FM closes at midnight, ahead of its relaunch. The last song to be played on the station is "Ev'ry Time We Say Goodbye" by Ella Fitzgerald.
- 7 June –
  - London's 102.2 Jazz FM is relaunched as 102.2 Smooth FM.
  - Alongside the launch of 102.2 Smooth Radio, the ejazz.fm website is renamed to jazzfm.com. The station also broadcasts on free-to-air digital satellite and via the Sky platform.

2006

- 10 April – It is announced that Jazzfm.com will no longer be available in Yorkshire from summer 2006 after Leeds United and the multiplex owner, MXR Yorkshire agree a deal to launch a new sports and music radio station, Yorkshire Radio.

2007

- No events.

2008

- 14 March – GMG Radio announces plans to relaunch Jazz FM from the jazzfm.com service which broadcasts on DAB in Glasgow, online and on a DAB multiplex in London, and requests that Ofcom remove the 45-hour jazz commitment for its Smooth Radio stations in London and Manchester.
- 22 April – Ofcom declines GMG Radio's request to remove the Smooth Radio jazz commitment. GMG relaunches Jazz FM despite having to retain the jazz commitment.
- 8 October – GMG Radio relaunches Jazz FM on DAB.

2009

- No events.

== 2010s ==
2010

- 5 August – With the announcement that Smooth Radio will become a national station from 4 October, the jazz commitments for London and the North West are also ended.

2011

- No events.

2012

- 23 April – Jazz FM is found to be in breach of Ofcom's broadcasting code after the transmission of an adult film soundtrack played at the beginning of one of its programmes on 19 February. However, the station is not fined over the incident.

2013

- 5–7 July – Jazz FM's inaugural Love Supreme Festival, the first greenfield jazz festival to be held in the UK for twenty years, is held at Glynde Place in East Sussex.
- 26 July – Jazz FM is heard on DAB in Northern Ireland for the first time as digital radio is switched on there, allowing a further 1.4 million listeners to hear the station.
- 29 November – Robbie Vincent announces he will leave Jazz FM. His final show airs on Sunday 1 December.

2014

- 1 January – Jazz FM stops broadcasting on the national Digital One multiplex, but continues to be available on DAB in London, online and through satellite television. Its Digital One slot is temporarily taken over by the return of Birdsong Radio, with plans for a permanent replacement in February.
- 11 February – LBC 97.3 launches nationally on the Digital One platform, taking over the slot formerly occupied by Jazz FM.
- 15 September – The Jazz FM schedule receives an overhaul, which includes an hour of specialist jazz programmes each day, and Lynn Parsons taking over as presenter of The Jazz Breakfast.

2015

- 4 March – Jazz FM celebrates its 25th anniversary with a series of clips from its archives.
- 12–15 November – BBC Radio 3 joins with Jazz FM to operate a four-day pop-up station called BBC Music Jazz.

2016

- 29 February – Jazz FM is made available nationally as a digital station again when it launches on the Sound Digital multiplex.
- 24 March – Mike Chadwick retires from the station after over 20 years.
- 22 June – Jazz FM announces it will extend its morning business programme, Business Breakfast from 30 minutes to an hour on 24 June to cover the results of the EU membership referendum.
- 15 August – Jazz FM introduces a new schedule. Clare Anderson's The Late Lounge is dropped, while Mark Walker succeeds Helen Mayhew as presenter of Dinner Jazz. New one-hour programmes are also introduced at 6pm.

2017

- 5 July – Jazz FM confirms its presenter Peter Young, known as PY to listeners, has stepped down from his presenting role after 27 years at the station due to ill health. The station also announces a new schedule beginning on 8 July, which will see three new presenters – Tony Minvielle, Tim Garcia and Anne Frankenstein – join its weekend lineup.

2018

- 21 March – Jazz FM have signed singer China Moses to present their late night weekday programme Jazz FM Loves.
- 16 August – Bauer Radio purchases Jazz FM.

2019

- No events.

== 2020s ==
2020

- 30 May – Saxophonist and broadcaster YolanDa Brown joins Jazz FM to present the Saturday afternoon programme YolanDa Brown on Saturday.
- 26 September – Simon Phillips joins Jazz FM to present Weekend Breakfast.

2021

- 24 January – Clare Teal joins Jazz FM to present a Sunday evening show dedicated to Big Band and Swing music.
- 21 February – David Jensen joins Jazz FM to present a six-part series about his love of jazz music. The programme will also highlight his work for Parkinson's UK.
- 28 March – Jeff Young presents his last Sunday morning show for Jazz FM, having announced the previous weekend his intention to leave the station after ten years.
- 4 April –
  - Jazz FM begins a new Sunday presenting line up which sees Tony Minvielle moving from a late night slot to replace Jeff Young's show, and the fulltime return of Robbie Vincent.
  - Jazz FM begins the ten-part series The Definitive History of Jazz in Britain, presented by BBC journalist Clive Myrie.
- 4 May – Bauer Radio announces plans to launch premium online subscription services to compliment Jazz FM as well as Scala Radio, Planet Rock and Kerrang! Radio, with an extra 20 stations available ad free and with extra content.

2022

- 9 January – Jazz Meets Classical, a six-part series exploring the relationship between jazz and classical music begins airing on both Jazz FM and Scala Radio.
- 19 August – Jazz FM launches its occasional Guest Head of Music feature, allowing an artist whose music is played on the station to choose the day's playlist. The first Guest Head of Music is Emma-Jean Thackray.

2023

- 19 April – Jazz FM is announced as the official media partner of Birmingham’s Mostly Jazz Funk and Soul Festival 2023, which takes place from 7–9 July.
- 24 April – Danielle Perry joins Jazz FM to present the weekday mid morning show, replacing Deb Grant.
- 28 August – Jamie Crick presents his final programme on Jazz FM prior to his death the following day.
- 13 September – Jazz FM confirms that the annual Jazz FM Awards will return in Spring 2024, moving back to spring following disruption during the COVID-19 pandemic.
- 23 October – Simon Phillips joins Jazz FM to take on the weekday drivetime show following the death of previous presenter Jamie Crick.

2024

- 22 June – Tim Smith joins Jazz FM to present their Summer Book Club.
- 22 July – Jazz FM launches a new summer schedule, which sees new programmes for several of its presenters, but the departure of Lil Koko and Claire Teal.
- 7 September – Ken Bruce joins Jazz FM to present Ken Bruce on Drums, a four-part weekly series looking at the role of the jazz drummer.
- 28 December – After a seven decade career presenting on British radio, Sarah Ward presents her final edition of The Sarah Ward Collection for Jazz FM, having decided to step back from presenting the show.

2025

- 1 January – Jazz FM airs a day of programmes dedicated to bandleader Quincy Jones under the title Q Year's Day.
- 18 January – Pianist and educator Nikki Yeoh joins Jazz FM to present a Saturday evening show from 10pm–12am, while regular presenter Chris Phillips moves to the earlier shot of 6pm–9pm, replacing Sarah Ward who retired from broadcasting at the end of 2024.

2026

- 28 March – Musician Dave Stewart joins presenter Elliot Moss alongside entrepreneur and investor Dominic Joseph for the first in a two-part special edition of Jazz FM's business series, Jazz Shapers, with the second part airing on 4 April.
