= Anthony Brand, 6th Viscount Hampden =

British noble

- Born: 7 May 1937
- Died: 4 January 2008 (aged 70)
- Spouse(s): Cara Proby (m. 1969; div. 1988) Sally Hambro (m. 1993)
- Children: 3
- Father: David Brand
- Relatives: Walter Rice (grandfather)

Anthony David Brand, 6th Viscount Hampden DL (7 May 1937 – 4 January 2008) was a British stock broker, Sussex land owner, South Downsman, hereditary peer and land agent.

== Early career ==
Brand was the son of the cricketer and financier David Brand, 5th Viscount Hampden (1902–1975) and his wife Imogen Alice Rhys, daughter of the Walter Rice, 7th Baron Dynevor. He had two younger sisters. He succeeded his father as Viscount Hampden in 1975. Educated at Eton and a member of White's, he worked in the banking and finance industry. He was at Lazard Brothers, merchant bankers, from 1956 to 1969, and Hoare Govett, stockbrokers, from 1970 to 1982. His uncle the 4th Viscount (1900–1965) had been managing director of Lazards from 1931 to 1965. His father had been chairman of the English, Scottish and Australian Bank from 1948 to c.1972.

== Glynde Estates ==
Subsequently he was estate manager of his own 6,000 acres (24 km^{2}), Glynde Estates, 1984–2002. Much of these and the flint-faced Elizabethan (1569) mansion house Glynde Place he had inherited from a second cousin (twice removed), Humphrey Brand (1895–1953), and his widow in c1953 and 1978. (Humphrey Brand had married Aimée, aka Poss, on 24 January 1940. The younger daughter of Sir Rupert Clarke, she by her first husband is grandmother of the present Baron Gerard, et al.) Humphrey Brand was the son of Admiral the Hon. Thomas Seymour Brand (1847–1916), who was second son of the 1st Viscount, Mr. Speaker Brand. (There had been an 1851 provision that the holder of the Barony of Dacre should always relinquish the Glynde estate in favour of the junior line; however, with the separation of the Dacre barony and the Hampden viscountcy in 1965 this arrangement would have lapsed, if it had not already.)

Glynde is a few miles north-east of Lewes, between Glyndebourne and Firle. Another part of the estate is at Mayfield, within Rother and the Weald; where the author Pamela Travers, creator of Mary Poppins, was once a tenant.

Glynde Place, which the Welsh Trevor family inherited in 1679, owes much of its present condition to an ancestral uncle, Richard Trevor (1701–1771), Prince Bishop of Durham from 1752 to 1771, who wintered there after 1744. Bishop Trevor is otherwise remembered today for having endowed in 1756 the Bishop's Palace, Auckland Castle, which he had had re-modeled from 1760, with the series of 12 (of the 13) portraits of Jacob and his sons which Francisco de Zurbarán (1598–1664) had painted in 1640. Glynde is home not only to a fine portrait of the Prince-Bishop by Thomas Hudson but to the Apotheosis of King James I (1629–1630), a 37.5 x 25 inches oil-on-wood sketch Rubens (1577–1640) made as preparation for his Banqueting House (Whitehall, Westminster) ceiling scheme. With some associated sketches it has been on loan (number L79) to the National Gallery since 1981. That picture had been acquired by Bishop Trevor's elder brother, Robert (1706–83), or by one of his nephews, the 2nd and 3rd (and last) viscounts Hampden (first creation). [thought somewhere to be the 2nd].

In December 2008 auctioneers Christie's sold, from their King Street, London rooms, two Canalettos from the Glynde collection (from the estate of the late Viscount), and another, also acquired by Thomas Brand (c1717-1770).

== Other affiliations ==
Lord Hampden was co-opted onto Glynde and Beddingham Parish Council in 1987 and was Chairman of the Sussex Branch Country Landowners Association, 1985–87 (President, 2003–?); and of South East Region, Historic Houses Association (HHA), 2001–05. He became a Deputy Lieutenant for East Sussex in 1986. Hampden was on the Governing Body of Battersea's Emanuel School, 1985–2004, and was a Governor from 1965 to 2005. The school has a strong family connection, having been co-founded by an ancestral aunt, Anne (d. 1595), daughter of Sir Richard Sackville, the wife of the 10th Baron Dacre. (Hampden's uncle, the 4th Lord Hampden, was the 26th Baron Dacre (created by writ 1321). On the uncle's death in 1965 that barony fell into temporary abeyance (til 1970) between sisters, while Anthony Hampden's father inherited the viscountcy).

== Literary work ==
He produced two books: Henry and Eliza, 1980; and A Glimpse of Glynde, 1997. Henry and Eliza is a collection of letters between Speaker Brand, the 1st Viscount Hampden (second creation) (and the 23rd Lord Dacre for about two years), and his wife, Eliza (1818–99), who was the daughter of general Robert Ellice by his wife Eliza Courtney (1792–1859); who in turn was Georgiana, Duchess of Devonshire's love-child by Charles, 2nd Earl Grey. A younger son of a younger son Henry Bouverie Brand, Speaker Brand, had inherited Glynde from his uncle Thomas, 20th Lord Dacre (1774–1851) in 1851.

== Family ==
Lord Hampden married Cara Fiona Proby, a granddaughter of Sir Richard Proby, 1st Baronet, in 1969 and divorced in 1988. The couple had three children:

- Francis Anthony Brand, 7th Viscount Hampden of Glynde (b. 1970); married with issue, including the heir apparent
- Hon. Saracha Mary Brand (b. 1973); married
- Hon. Jonathan Claud David Humphrey Brand (b. 1975)

He remarried to Sally Hambro (1938-2025) in 1993. She was the daughter of Sir Charles Jocelyn Hambro, great-grandson of Carl Joachim Hambro, the founding partner of Hambros Bank. The union bore no children.

Peerage of the United Kingdom
Preceded by David Francis Brand	Viscount Hampden; 2nd creation 1975–2008	Succeeded by Francis Anthony Brand
