= Jazz FM (UK) =

British digital radio station

- London; United Kingdom
- Broadcast area: United Kingdom; Malta
- Frequencies: DAB+: 11A Sound Digital; Malta: DAB+: 6C Digi B

Programming
- Format: Jazz/soul/blues

Ownership
- Owner: Bauer Media Audio UK

History
- First air date: 6 October 2008

Links
- Webcast: Rayo
- Website: Jazz FM

Jazz FM is a British digital radio station owned and operated by Bauer Media Audio UK. It broadcasts across the United Kingdom and Malta predominantly playing jazz music, jazz standards as well as blues and soul music.

The station, in this incarnation set up by Richard Wheatly, traces its roots back to 102.2 Jazz FM, which first launched in 1990. The current station commenced broadcasting on 6 October 2008.

As of September 2024, the station has a weekly audience of 537,000 listeners according to RAJAR.

== History ==
=== 102.2 Jazz FM ===
London station 102.2 Jazz FM was launched on 4 March 1990 with a concert performed by Ella Fitzgerald at the Royal Albert Hall. Jazz FM played mainly soul and jazz music and was broadcast to the London area. A sister station in Manchester called 100.4 Jazz FM was launched on 1 September 1994. The Jazz FM stations were purchased by the Guardian Media Group in 2002, and became part of the company's radio division, GMG Radio Holdings Ltd.

In 2003, GMG Radio conducted market research into the type of music that listeners in the north-west of England wanted to hear on the radio. The study concluded that many people were dissuaded by the name Jazz, and as a result, 100.4 Jazz FM closed on 13 February 2004 and relaunched as Smooth FM on 1 March. In 2005, GMG rebranded the London station 102.2 Smooth FM. The two renamed stations played middle of the road music, soul and R&B during the day and as part of their licence requirements, jazz music at night.

=== ejazz.fm alongside Jazz FM ===
The ejazz.fm logo.

The original site ejazz.fm launched by Jazz FM on 7 June 2000 as a website focused on the wide genre of jazz and included free and subscription based jazz content as well as two continuous jazz music streams for uptempo and downtempo jazz. The website was originally designed by the DDW agency. Club ejazz for a subscription of £5 a month allowed listeners to listen to exclusive one-hour specialist shows from Jazz FM presenters as well as live and recorded concert material.

The website was relaunched by the Guardian Media Group to its current look on 12 July 2004 promising more than 200 specially commissioned programmes exclusive to the website, with five new programmes being added each month from Jazz FM's presenters such as Sarah Ward, the late Campbell Burnap and Peter Young, as well as jazz news and features, including the ejazz.fm artist of the month. The subscription fee for Club ejazz was dropped but user registration remained.

The website was heavily promoted via the Jazz FM website and through advertising on Jazz FM.

=== The rebrand to jazzfm.com on DAB ===
The jazzfm.com logo

The ejazz.fm website was renamed to jazzfm.com on 7 June 2005, alongside the change of 102.2 Jazz FM to 102.2 Smooth FM. It was on this date that the radio station appeared on DAB in Yorkshire, south Wales and the Severn estuary using spare capacity from the now defunct Smooth Digital service. The station also broadcast on free-to-air digital satellite and via the Sky platform.

It was announced that on Monday 10 April 2006 that the service would no longer be available in Yorkshire on DAB from the summer of 2006 after a deal was reached with Leeds United and the multiplex owner, MXR Yorkshire to launch a new sports and music radio station, Yorkshire Radio, which took over the space formerly occupied by jazzfm.com. The Yorkshire jazzfm.com service closed on 26 June 2006 to make way for Yorkshire Radio test transmissions to take place, ready for its launch on 10 July 2006.

The station was also carried on the Sky platform across the United Kingdom, but on Wednesday 3 May 2006, jazzfm.com was removed from the electronic programme guide, and did continue to be broadcast from the Astra 2B satellite, one of the satellites which provides part of the Sky service, for a short while after. GMG Radio said that the money saved by pulling the plug on the Sky and DAB services would be re-invested into the website. The jazzfm.com Blue Room stream would still be available on the website.

In March 2007, GMG Radio purchased and rebranded all the Saga stations. In the West Midlands, Saga 105.7 FM and Smooth Radio both broadcast on the MXR West Midlands DAB ensemble. Smooth FM and Saga 105.7 FM merged to become Smooth Radio and the spare slot formerly used by Smooth FM was replaced with jazzfm.com. The service also replaced Saga 105.2 FM on Monday 26 March on the Score Glasgow multiplex as Smooth Radio is already broadcast on the Switch Central Scotland ensemble.

Panjab Radio replaced jazzfm.com with Panjab Radio and Asian FX in the West Midlands on 1 November 2007 after a deal between the station and multiplex owner MXR was reached.

GMG Radio was also looking to sell its other DAB slot currently held in south Wales and the Severn estuary since the closure of jazzfm.com in Yorkshire. That service was earmarked to close in late 2006, but continued to broadcast after this date. However, in an Ofcom radio broadcast update for August 2007, it was confirmed that it would close at an unspecified date to allow the launch of two stations from United Christian Broadcasters (UCB) in a separate deal with MXR. The station left the multiplex on 28 September 2007 to be replaced by UCB UK and UCB Inspirational.

The only area to continue broadcasting jazzfm.com on DAB, Glasgow and west central Scotland, made the switch to Jazz FM on 6 October 2008.

==== jazzfm.com Playlist ====
The jazzfm.com DAB service and website relayed one stream of a mixture of smooth jazz and funk music in the daytime and traditional and mainstream jazz music in the evening without DJs at 64 kbit/s Windows Media Audio 9 format in stereo for free and at a higher bitrate through a subscription to RealMusic. Until 16 June 2008 the free bitrate streamed at 32 kbit/s. The jazzfm.com radio station on DAB was relayed at 128 kbit/s joint stereo MPEG-1 Audio Layer II encoding. At the top of each hour, a news bulletin produced and provided by Sky News Radio was broadcast.

The website however, used to have two dedicated stations, the Red Room and the Blue Room. The Blue Room played more smooth jazz and funk. The Blue Room feed was the one that was played on the Sky and DAB feeds as smooth jazz is more commercially viable and popular with listeners. From March 2006 the Blue Room used to carry advertising immediately after the news bulletin, though this was dropped later in its life. The Red Room played all styles of modern jazz from the 1950s up to the present day. The Red Room's jazz output was continuous and uninterrupted, without advertising or news bulletins. Neither station has DJs on its output.

==== Availability ====
jazzfm.com used to broadcast on the internet as well as digital radio in the United Kingdom on DAB in west central Scotland. It used to broadcast smooth jazz and funk music on DAB in Yorkshire, south Wales, the Severn estuary, the West Midlands and on Sky. The DAB service carried jazzfm.com at a higher bitrate free-to-air than the website stream.

=== Relaunch of jazzfm.com for the return of Jazz FM ===
The first iteration of the Jazz FM logo used from the launch, which brought back the Jazz FM chameleon and "Listen in Colour" branding formerly used by Jazz FM back in the early 2000s (decade) on their London and North West FM stations

On 28 February 2008 GMG Radio's chief executive John Myers made an announcement that Jazz FM would be brought back as a relaunch of the current jazzfm.com service with presenters on DAB. Myers also said that he believed it would make more sense for there to be a dedicated radio station for jazz listeners than the current 45 hours of jazz to be played on Smooth FM, as required by its Ofcom licence. The closure of theJazz on Digital One was also part of the reason for the return of Jazz FM.

The original plan for the relaunch of Jazz FM by GMG Radio as set out in their format change requests for 102.2 Smooth Radio and 100.4 Smooth Radio in March 2008 would be to play smooth jazz during the day and jazz at night, including the return of the former Jazz FM Dinner Jazz programme.

In June 2008, The Local Radio Company, run under the former chief executive of 102.2 Jazz FM, Richard Wheatly, signed a three-year deal with GMG Radio to relaunch Jazz FM on DAB. According to The Times, no money exchanged hands in the deal. However, The Telegraph reported that the deal was done for a single pound. The annual report from TLRC published in March 2009 shows that the station cost it £30,000 a month to provide the Jazz FM service on behalf of GMG. There were also plans to relaunch the Jazz FM Records label with CD and download sales. The first CD released by Jazz FM was The Sound of Jazz FM 2008 on 20 October 2008. WARL was appointed to advertise the relaunched station prior to its launch, including the return of the Jazz FM chameleon and Listen in Colour branding used previously on 102.2 Jazz FM. The station raised awareness of the relaunch through email and social media as well as a nationwide campaign through posters, national newspapers and magazines featuring the Jazz FM chameleon in 3D and listen in colour branding.

==== Launch ====
The station launched on 6 October 2008 at 19:00 BST (18:00 UTC) with an introductory speech from Richard Wheatly, followed by the Dinner Jazz programme with Sarah Ward. However, there were some problems with the playout system a few minutes into the programme, which interrupted the music but were soon fixed. The first song played was Art Pepper's "All the Things You Are".

==== Management changes and sale of Jazz FM ====
Hierarchy of Jazz FM from 1990 to present

On 31 October 2008 Richard Wheatly stepped down as executive chairman of The Local Radio Company to become executive chairman of Jazz FM with immediate effect.

On 7 January 2009 TLRC placed Jazz FM up for sale following a strategic review of the company. Under the agreement to run the station with GMG, TLRC had to give six months notice if it wished to stop running the station. Richard Wheatly resigned from his role with TLRC on the same day. Wheatly formed a consortium to proceed with a management buyout to purchase Jazz FM. A deal with Wheatly was done for £1 on 9 April 2009, where it was also revealed that the station had made a loss of £733,000 in the first six months of operation, as well as investments from a couple of financial companies and a number of individuals.

==== The Jazz FM Investments Ltd era ====
Rajar listening figures for Jazz FM were first published for the first quarter of 2009, which showed that the station had attracted 408,000 listeners. In April 2009, Jazz FM became a tenant of World Radio Network Broadcast, allowing the live broadcasting of programming from its two studios in Vauxhall, London. Jazz FM also leased office space within the same complex.

In April 2009, Richard Wheatly bought the name and branding rights for Jazz FM from GMG Radio.

In May 2009, Jazz FM started a £500,000 poster marketing campaign using the Listen in Colour strapline and promoting the station as an antidote to the current worldwide financial recession. The station also announced the return of Helen Mayhew, who was a former 102.2 Jazz FM presenter and joined Sarah Ward on the Dinner Jazz programme, which expanded to six a nights a week from its original run of five on 3 July 2009.

Jazz FM also gained an exclusive from the artist Prince in July 2009 to play his new track In a Large Room with No Light prior to his performance at the Montreux Jazz Festival.

It was announced on 11 May 2010 that Jazz FM would close down on DAB in south Wales and the Severn estuary, to be replaced with 102.2 Smooth Radio.

On Monday 13 September 2010, Jazz FM rebroadcast the original launch concert with Ella Fitzgerald and the Count Basie Orchestra which launched the first incarnation of Jazz FM, in London back on 4 March 1990. On 19 September 2010 it was revealed that Jazz FM Investments Ltd was to be floated on the London Stock Exchange.

On Monday 21 March 2011, Jazz FM expanded its coverage across the UK by launching its service on the Digital One DAB ensemble while the replicated services across the local and regional ensembles closed at the end of August 2011.

On Saturday 18 February 2012, Sounds from a Pornographic film were played over advertisements and music for 5 minutes, Jazz FM said that an employee had opened a link in a personal email containing pornographic content and had left their computer linked to the sound fader. They were later found in breach of rule 2.3 of the Ofcom Broadcasting Code by the regulator.

==== Love Supreme Festival ====
In 2013 Jazz FM and its business partners launched the Love Supreme festival, an event featuring a weekend of outdoor jazz and other music played by the station, and the first festival of its type in the UK for more than two decades. The festival had its inaugural weekend at Glynde Place, East Sussex in July 2013, and included performances by Nile Rodgers, Chic, Bryan Ferry, Charles Bradley and others. John Fordham of The Guardian gave the festival a positive reception. "By reviving the 1950s tradition of the outdoor Beaulieu jazz festival, promoters Jazz FM and their partners may find they have invented the British jazz world's Glastonbury."

==== Bauer Media Group acquisition ====
On 16 August 2018 Jazz FM was acquired by the Bauer Media Group for an undisclosed sum.

On 13 December 2023, Jazz FM was removed from Sky, along with every other radio station owned by Bauer Media on the TV platform, including Absolute Radio, Absolute Radio 80s, Absolute Radio 90s, Absolute Radio Classic Rock, Hits Radio, Greatest Hits Radio, Kiss, Magic and Planet Rock.

== Availability ==
Jazz FM is broadcast in stereo on the Sound Digital ensemble using DAB+ technology. It also broadcasts in stereo using DAB+ on the Digi B 3 ensemble across Malta. Jazz FM can also be heard via the Internet via Bauer's Rayo app on iPhone and Google Android. Previously it launched its own app on the aforementioned platforms. The station is also available via other internet radio providers.

=== Sound Digital ===
In plans released in January 2015, it was revealed that Jazz FM signed an agreement with Sound Digital to provide Jazz FM on the proposed second national digital radio ensemble in the UK should they be the successful applicant. Sound Digital won the licence and began test transmissions on 15 February 2016 ahead of a full service commencing 29 February 2016 that is expected to reach 75% of the UK population. In a change to the original application Jazz FM commenced broadcasts using DAB+ technology in Stereo, and is one of three national stations to use DAB+ on the Sound Digital ensemble.

=== Former Availability ===
Jazz FM was formerly on the Switch London ensemble in mono using the original DAB technology in London. Jazz FM was also available via free-to-air digital satellite on the Sky satellite platform from Jazz FM's initial launch date in 2008 and the Freesat satellite platform from 21 October 2008.

==== Digital One ====
The station was as of 21 March 2011 broadcast across Great Britain on the Digital One DAB ensemble, extending to Northern Ireland on 26 July 2013. Until the end of August 2011, Jazz FM was also broadcast on DAB ensembles in London, the north-west of England and the West Midlands where it replaced Real Radio and was replaced by Real Radio XS. The station was also broadcast on a west central Scotland DAB ensemble as well as until 21 March 2011 in south Wales and the Severn estuary where it replaced 102.2 Smooth Radio and was ultimately replaced again by the same station. Jazz FM used DAB capacity from GMG Radio to formerly broadcast on the local and regional DAB ensembles.

==== Trial Norwich ====
Jazz FM additionally commenced broadcasts on the Trial Norwich Local DAB ensemble in September 2015 originally using DAB but switching to DAB+ on 16 June 2018. Norwich was not initially covered by the national Sound Digital ensemble but now is after the ensemble was extended to Norfolk in late 2018. Subsequently, Jazz FM no longer broadcasts on the ensemble.

== Jazz FM Awards ==
In 2013, the Jazz FM Awards were launched, presented annually to celebrate the work of jazz, blues and soul musicians, promoting excellence and recognising those who have made exceptional contributions.

== Notable presenters and shows ==
- YolanDa Brown (Saturdays)
- Ruth Fisher (Full Circle (Thursdays) and Performance Series (Mondays))
- Tim Garcia (Musica Macondo (Saturdays))
- Helen Mayhew (Late Night Jazz (Fridays) and True Brit (Thursdays))
- China Moses (Late Night China Moses (evenings))
- Chris Philips (The Blueprint (Saturdays))
- Jez Nelson (Somethin' Else (Sundays))
- John Osborne (Sundays)
- Ian Shaw (The Ronnie Scott's Radio Show (Fridays))
- Robbie Vincent (Sundays)
- Nigel Williams (Breakfast and The Saturday Morning Show)
- Michael Wilson (The Business Breakfast)

== See also ==
- Timeline of Jazz FM (UK)
- TheJazz
