= John Hampden-Trevor, 3rd Viscount Hampden =

British diplomat (1748–1824)

John Hampden-Trevor
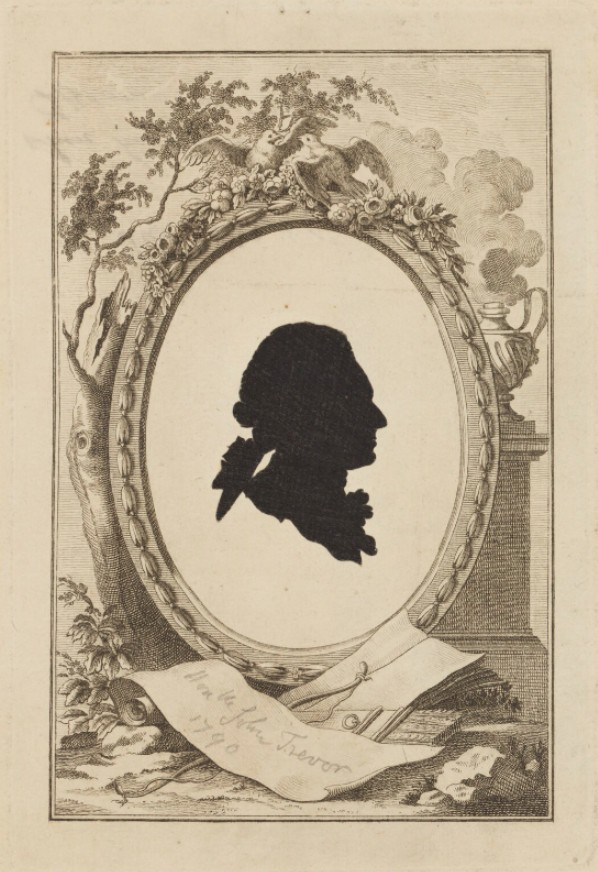
- Silhouette of Hampden-Trevor

British Minister to Sardinia
- In office 1783–1798

British Minister to Bavaria
- In office 1780–1783

Personal details
- Born: 24 February 1748
- Died: 9 September 1824 (aged 76)
- Spouse: Harriet Burton (m. 1773)
- Parent: Robert Hampden (father)
- Relatives: Thomas Trevor (grandfather); Anne Trevor (grandmother)
- Education: Christ Church, Oxford

John Hampden-Trevor, 3rd Viscount Hampden PC (24 February 1748 – 9 September 1824), was a British diplomat.

== Biography ==
He was the younger son of Robert Hampden, 1st Viscount Hampden and was educated at Westminster School and Christ Church, Oxford. He followed in his father's career by becoming a diplomat. He was Minister to Munich (1780 – 1783) and to Turin (1783 – 1798).

On 8 May 1773, he married Harriet Burton (1751–1829), daughter of the Rev. Daniel Burton. Trevor was appointed to the Privy Council in 1797. He succeeded to the Viscountcy of Hampden on 20 August 1824, just three weeks before his death. He had no heirs, and the title became extinct at that time.

Diplomatic posts
Preceded by Morton Eden	Minister to Bavaria; 1780–1783	Succeeded by The Viscount Galway
Preceded by The Lord Cardiff	British Minister to Sardinia; 1783–1798	Vacant No representation due to the French occupation of Turin Title next held by Thomas Jackson
Peerage of Great Britain
Preceded by Thomas Hampden-Trevor	Viscount Hampden; 1st creation 1824	Extinct
