= Rachel Douglas-Home, 27th Baroness Dacre =

British noble (1929–2012)

The Right Honourable The Baroness Dacre
- Born: 24 October 1929
- Died: 25 December 2012 (aged 83)
- Spouse: William Douglas-Home (m. 1951; died 1992)
- Children: 4
- Father: Thomas Brand
- Relatives: Thomas Brand (grandfather)

Rachel Leila Douglas-Home, 27th Baroness Dacre (née Brand; 24 October 1929 – 25 December 2012) was an English peer.

== Early life ==
Lady Dacre was a daughter of Thomas Brand, 4th Viscount Hampden and 26th Baron Dacre, and his wife, Leila Emily Seely, a granddaughter of Sir Charles Seely, 1st Baronet, and a great-great-granddaughter of John Russell, 6th Duke of Bedford. She was also a great-granddaughter of William Montagu Douglas Scott, 6th Duke of Buccleuch and through him a direct descendant of Charles II of England.

== Peerage ==
The ancient English barony, created by writ of summons, fell into abeyance between her and her younger surviving sister (The Hon Mrs Ogilvie Thompson) upon her father's death in 1965 and was called out of abeyance in 1970 in favour of The Hon Mrs Douglas-Home, whilst the Hampden viscountcy passed to her uncle.

== Personal life ==
She married on 26 July 1951 The Hon William Douglas-Home, third son of Charles Douglas-Home, 13th Earl of Home, and a younger brother of the 14th Earl of Home, better known as Sir Alec Douglas-Home, former Prime Minister of the United Kingdom. They were third cousins, due to their common descent from James Hamilton, 1st Duke of Abercorn. Dacre and her husband lived in Hampshire, and had four children:

- James Thomas Archibald Douglas-Home, 28th Baron Dacre (16 May 1952 – 8 May 2014), who married in 1979 Christine Stephenson. On his death, their only child, Emily (b. 7 Feb 1983), became 29th Baroness Dacre.
- The Hon. Sarah Douglas-Home (b. 4 July 1954), married in 1977 Nicholas Dent and has issue.
- The Hon. Gian Leila Douglas-Home (b. 23 June 1958).
- The Hon. Dinah Lilian Douglas-Home (b. 22 Jan 1964), married in 1989 Harry Marriott and has issue.

Her husband died in 1992. Dacre herself died on 25 December 2012 and was succeeded by her son James, who became the 28th Baron Dacre. All of her children, and their descendants, are in remainder to the Dacre barony.

== Sources ==
Peerage of England
In abeyance Title last held by Thomas Brand	Baroness Dacre; 1st creation 1970–2012	Succeeded by James Douglas-Home
