= Church of St Owen, Bromham =

Church in Bedfordshire, England

Coordinates: 52.1503°N 0.5201°W

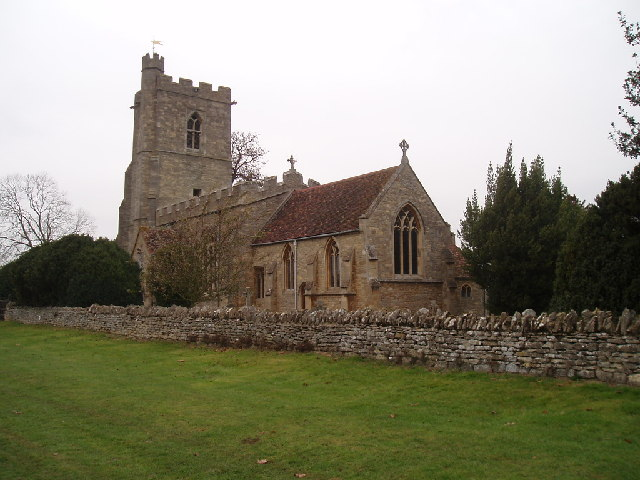

The Church of St Owen is a Grade I listed church in Bromham, Bedfordshire, England. It became a listed building on 13 July 1964.

The church is a 17th-century building and stands in a parkland setting. There is an alabaster tomb and a triple monumental brass in the chancel.

== History ==
=== Pre-18th century ===
The north wall dates from the 13th century, while the tower dates from the 15th century.

=== 18th century ===
In 1740, Lord Trevor donated a library collection to the church, which used to be upstairs.

=== 19th century ===
The church's adjoining Dyve chapel was built in 1868. Some window restorations were also made in the same year.

=== 20th century ===
In 1906, a fire badly damaged the church, though repairs were made.

On 13 July 1964 the church became a Grade I listed building.

== Architecture ==
The church has a chancel, a north aisle, and chapel on the north side. There are two-storey porches on both the north and south sides, as well as a west tower and stair turret.

== Notable people ==
- Paula Vennells served as a non-stipendiary minister at the church from 2006 to 2021. She was also CEO of the Post Office from 2012 to 2019.

== See also ==
- Grade I listed buildings in Bedfordshire
