= Whig Split =

Situation in British politics from 1717 to 1720

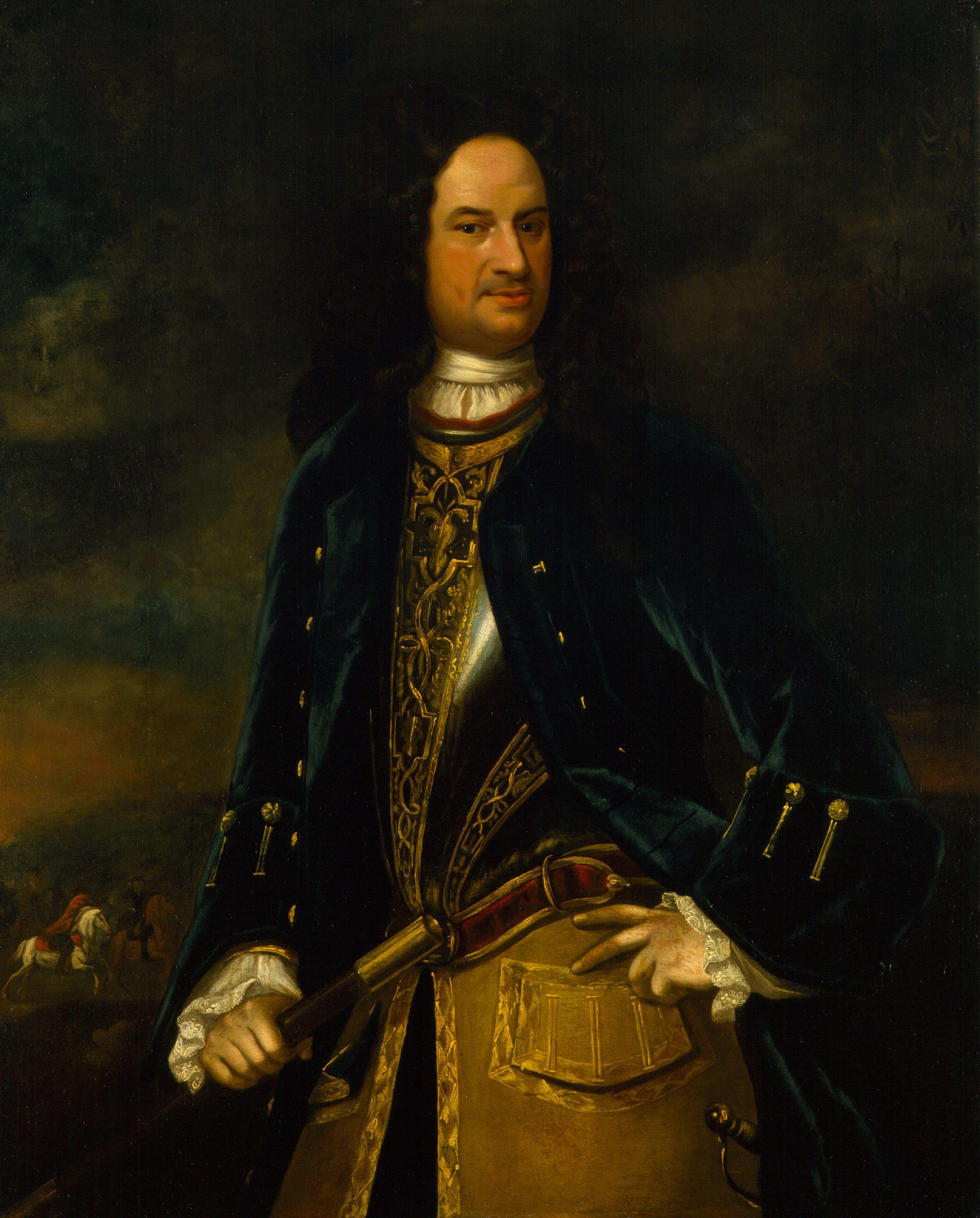
James Stanhope, a former military commander, led the government Whigs during the split.

The Whig Split occurred between 1717 and 1720, when the governing British Whig Party divided into two factions: one in government, led by James Stanhope; the other in opposition, dominated by Robert Walpole. It coincided with a dispute between George I and his son George, Prince of Wales, with the latter siding with the opposition Whigs. It is also known as the Whig Schism. It lasted for three years before being resolved by a reconciliation between the two factions. Walpole went on to serve as Prime Minister from 1721 to 1742.

== Background ==
Following the Hanoverian Succession in 1714, the Tory government previously led by Robert Harley was ousted and the new King George I appointed a Whig-dominated ministry, commencing the fifty-year Whig Oligarchy. This new government successfully resisted the 1715 Jacobite Rebellion which aimed to establish the exiled James on the throne.

Growing tension between leading ministers in 1716 was increased during George's visit to his native Electorate of Hanover that summer. He was accompanied by his Secretary of State James Stanhope. While on the Continent, Stanhope played a major role in negotiating the Anglo-French Alliance reversing Britain's historic opposition to the French Crown. Stanhope also supported George over the Great Northern War, in which Hanover was trying to annexe both the Duchy of Bremen and smaller Duchy of Verden. The outcome of this was that a British fleet under John Norris was sent to the Baltic to support Russia against Sweden. This action was much criticised for subordinating British interests to those of Hanover, something that had specifically been ruled out in the Act of Settlement.

== Split ==
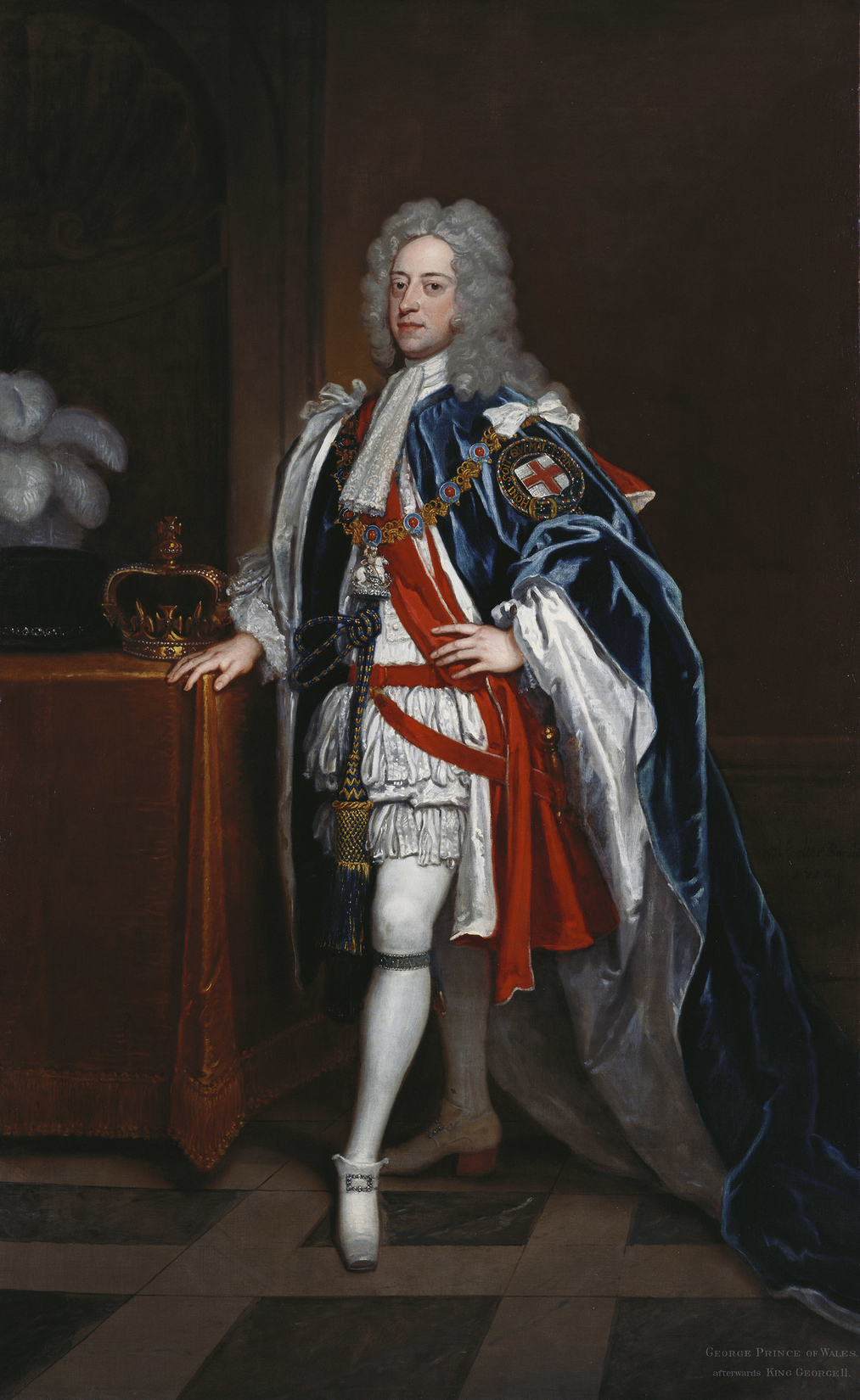
After falling out with his father King George, his son George, Prince of Wales joined with the Opposition Whigs.

The developing hostility also involved Walpole's brother-in-law and close political ally Lord Townshend. Townshend was removed from his role supervising Britain's foreign policy, but was transferred to be Lord Lieutenant of Ireland to soften the blow. However, in April 1717 Townshend was dismissed from the government after voting against it in the Lords over its anti-Swedish policy. Walpole, as Chancellor of the Exchequer, and his supporters promptly resigned from the government and the split became formal. With his ally, the Earl of Sunderland, Stanhope took over full control of the government as First Minister. To boost the ranks of their ministry he briefly appointed the playwright Joseph Addison as Secretary of State.

The disharmony was increased when Prince George and his father, whose relationship had often been strained, had a dramatic falling out. This occurred when the Duke of Newcastle, a young minister, had a misunderstanding with the Prince and believed he had been challenged to a duel by him. The King responded angrily, and in consequence Prince George and his wife Caroline of Ansbach were banished from St James's Palace, being forced to leave behind their three daughters. They took up residence at Leicester House, spending their summers at Richmond Lodge near the River Thames, and established a rival court to that of the King. This attracted politicians hostile to the Stanhope government, particularly the opposition Whigs. Both the Jacobites and foreign powers opposed to Britain tried to take advantage of the royal rift.

Walpole and his followers allied with the Tories, to whom they had recently been bitterly opposed, to oppose new proposals by Stanhope's government. A significant victory for the opposition came with the government failure to impeach Harley, now Lord Oxford, for his role in the Peace of Utrecht. After two years' imprisonment in the Tower of London, he was released in July 1717. Walpole strongly attacked funding the new war with Spain, fought in alliance with France. He joined with Tories to support reductions in military spending.

A particularly significant victory occurred in 1719 when the Peerage Bill was defeated. This was a proposal to perpetually limit the membership of the Lords to existing members and their heirs, drawn up partly in response to Harley's controversial creation of a dozen new peers in 1711 to create a Tory majority in the Whig-dominated House of Lords. As Stanhope had recently been made an Earl by the King, Walpole mockingly suggested he was "now desirous to shut the door after him".

== Reconciliation ==
Although in 1719 the Duke of Newcastle had suggested that Walpole was so close to the Tories, that at the next election the Whig government would have little trouble in portraying them as part of a single party with the Jacobites by 1720 the Whig rivals began to move towards each other again. A formal reconciliation was agreed between the King and his son.

Both Walpole and Townshend returned to office in June 1720, becoming respectively Paymaster of the Forces and Lord President of the Council. Stanhope continued as first minister. Despite assurances given to her by Walpole, the Princess and her husband were not given full access to their children. Although she remained politically aligned with him, the Princess considered that she had been exploited by Walpole during the reconciliation.

== Aftermath ==
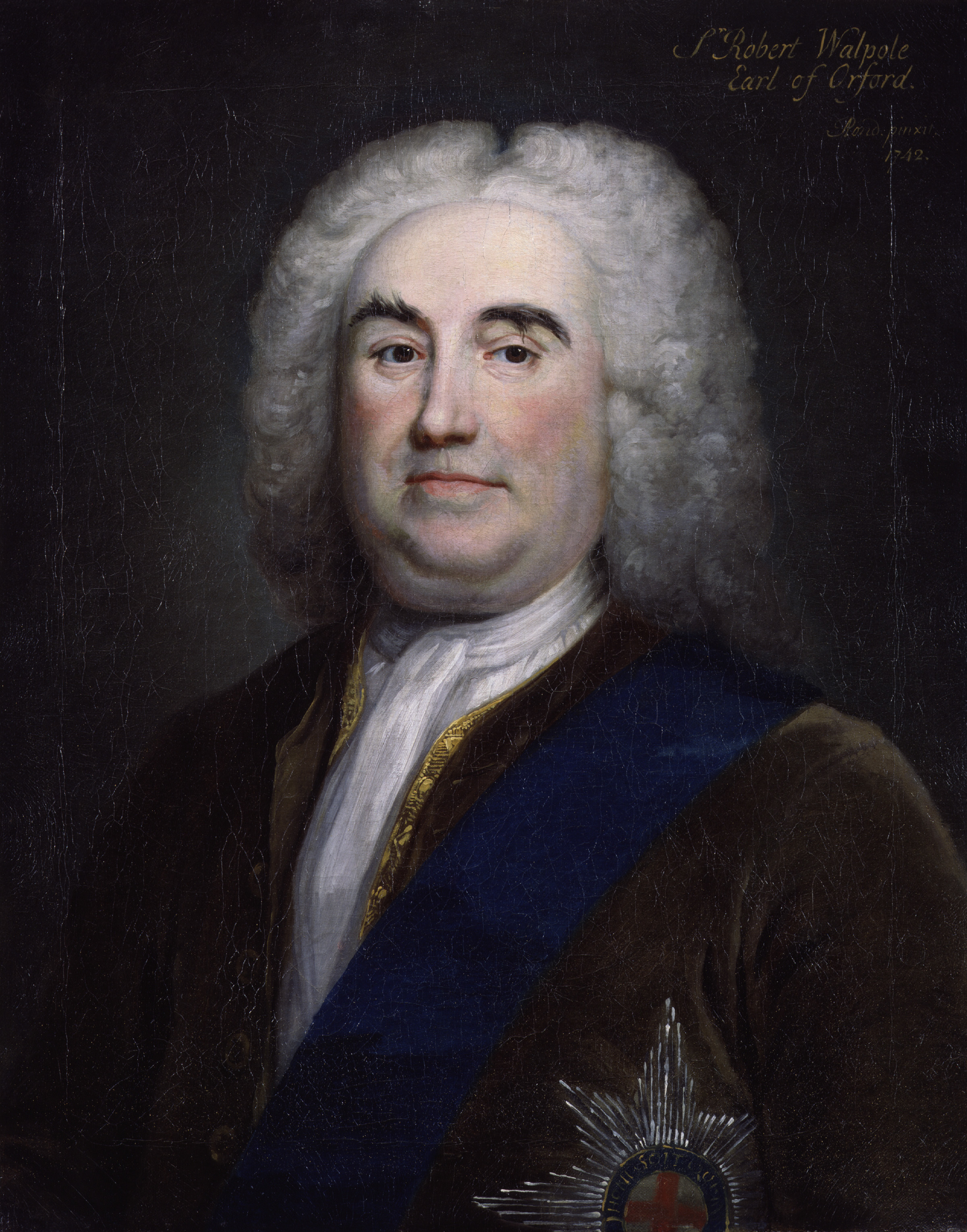
After reconciling with his Whig opponents, Sir Robert Walpole became the Prime Minister from 1721 to 1742.

During the scandal over the collapse of the South Sea Bubble, many prominent Whigs were forced to leave office. Although Walpole had not been involved in the management of the bubble, he defended those who had. Two months after Stanhope died while himself defending the government's conduct in the House of Lords, Walpole was appointed to replace him. Led by Walpole at the 1722 general election, the Whigs won a decisive victory. His premiership lasted for over twenty years, firmly establishing the Whig Party's ascendancy. Walpole was subsequently accused of hypocrisy for attacking in opposition many of the same policies that he later advocated in government.

In the 1730s a fresh group of Whigs split off to form the Patriot Whigs, and established a working alliance with the Tories. In 1742, their combined strength was sufficient to bring down the Walpole government. However, Whig dominance continued under Henry Pelham, a longstanding minister under Walpole, and his successor the Duke of Newcastle.

== Bibliography ==
- Black, Jermey (2001). Walpole in Power. Sutton Publishing. ISBN 978-0-7509-2523-5.
- Dennison, Matthew (2017). The First Iron Lady: A Life of Caroline of Ansbach. HarperCollins. ISBN 978-0-00-812199-0.
- Harris, Carolyn (2011). Raising Royalty: 1000 Years of Royal Parenting. Dundurn.
- Hill, Brian W. (1996). The Early Parties and Politics in Britain, 1688–1832. Macmillan.
- Jones, Clyve (1986). Britain in the First Age of Party, 1687–1750. A&C Black.
- Murray, John Joseph (1969). George I, the Baltic, and the Whig Split of 1717: A Study in Diplomacy and Propaganda. University of Chicago Press.
- Paul, Helen (2011). The South Sea Bubble: An Economic History of Its Origins and Consequences. Routledge.
- Pearce, Edward (2011). The Great Man: Sir Robert Walpole: Scoundrel, Genius and Britain's First Prime Minister. Random House.
