= Thomas Trevor, 2nd Baron Trevor =

Thomas Trevor, 2nd Baron Trevor (1691–1753) was a Welsh peer in the peerage of Great Britain, a member of the House of Lords from 1730 until his death, and a landowner at Bromham, Bedfordshire.

The elder son of Thomas Trevor, 1st Baron Trevor, and his wife Elizabeth Searle (1672–1702), a daughter of John Searle of Finchley, Trevor married Elizabeth Burrell (1697–1734), a daughter of Timothy Burrell of Ockenden House, Cuckfield, a barrister. They had one daughter, Elizabeth (1715–1761), who in 1732 with a fortune of £20,000 married Charles Spencer, 3rd Duke of Marlborough, thereby becoming the ancestress of the later Dukes of Marlborough.

Trevor's younger half-brother was Richard Trevor, who became Bishop of Durham.

On his death in 1753, Trevor's peerage was inherited by his younger brother, John Trevor, 3rd Baron Trevor (1695–1764), who married Elizabeth, a daughter of Richard Steele. They had one daughter, and on the death of the third baron the peerage went to his older half-brother Robert Hampden-Trevor, the elder son of the first baron's second marriage, who later was created Viscount Hampden.

Arms of Trevor: Party per bend sinister ermine and ermines, a lion rampant or
