= Bromham =

Bromham may refer to:

- Bromham, Bedfordshire, a village in the county of Bedfordshire, England
- Bromham, Wiltshire, a village in the county of Wiltshire, England
