= Anne Trevor, Baroness Trevor =

English aristocrat (died 1746)

Anne Trevor
- Baroness
- Born: Anne Weldon Bernard
- Died: 5 December 1746
- Buried: 13 December 1746; Bromham, Bedfordshire
- Spouses: Sir Robert Bernard, 3rd Bt. and Thomas Trevor, 1st Baron Trevor
- Issue: John, born c. 1695 from first husband; unknown; Robert Hampden-Trevor, 1st Viscount Hampden; Richard Trevor (1707–1771)
- Father: Robert Weldon (or Weildon) of St. Lawrence Jewry

Anne Weldon Bernard (died 5 December 1746) was an English aristocrat and philanthropist.

Anne Weldon was the daughter of Robert Weldon (or Weildon) of St. Lawrence Jewry, who was a mercer in Fleet Street, London. On 26 May 1692 she married Sir Robert Bernard, 3rd Bt., at St. Margaret's Church, Westminster. Their son John, born c. 1695 in Brampton, Huntingdonshire, became forth Baronet.

She became the second wife of Thomas Trevor, 1st Baron Trevor, on 25 September 1704. They had three sons, the second of whom, Robert Hampden-Trevor, 1st Viscount Hampden, succeeded to Trevor's barony after his elder brothers (issue of Trevor's first wife, Elizabeth Searle) died. Her third son, Richard Trevor (1707–1771), was Bishop of St Davids from 1744 to 1752, and then Bishop of Durham.

She was a signatory to Thomas Coram's petition to King George II to establish the Foundling Hospital. She signed on 2 December 1734.

She died on 5 December 1746, and was buried on 13 December 1746 at Bromham, Bedfordshire.
