= Impeachment of Robert Harley, Earl of Oxford =

Event in British politics

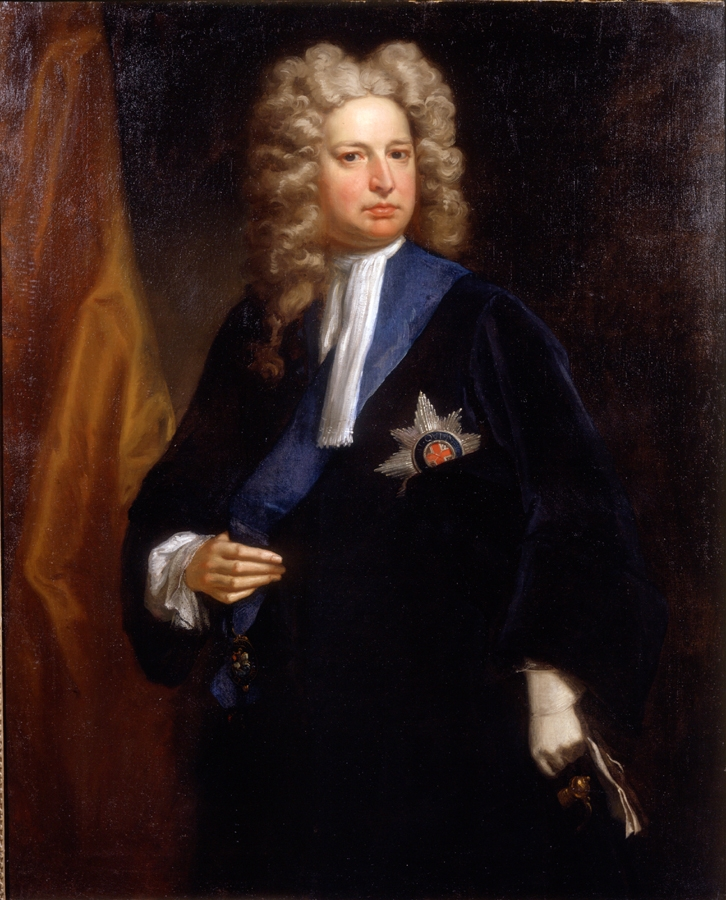
First Minister from 1710 to 1714, Robert Harley, Earl of Oxford was charged by Parliament in 1715 for his conduct as leader of the Harley ministry. After two years in the Tower of London he was released.

The Impeachment of Robert Harley, Earl of Oxford was a legal process in the Kingdom of Great Britain in 1715 when the former First Minister Robert Harley, Earl of Oxford was impeached and sent to the Tower of London. Harley was accused of a number of crimes including high treason during his time in office, with charges particularly focusing on his role in the 1713 Peace of Utrecht which ended the War of the Spanish Succession.

His arrest coincided with the Jacobite rebellion of 1715, which was led in Scotland and directed from France by former members of Harley's administration John Erskine, Earl of Mar and Henry St John, 1st Viscount Bolingbroke. After two years of imprisonment, in 1717 a motion was brought by the Opposition that the government should either bring Harley to trial or release him. Harley, benefiting from the Whig Split that had divided his enemies into factions, was acquitted and released. This remains the last time a head of government was impeached in Britain.

== Background ==
A former Whig, Harley had come to power in 1710, leading a Tory government which was increasingly aware of the anti-war mood of the country in contrast to the pro-war Whigs. The Tories won a decisive victory at the 1710 general election. Harley and the Secretary of State Lord Bolingbroke opened covert peace negotiations with France.

The Captain General, the Duke of Marlborough, was dismissed in late 1711 and replaced by the Tory Duke of Ormonde. Ormonde was given a secret, later controversial, "restraining order" not to fight against the French while talks were approaching their conclusion. Mid-campaign Ormonde pulled his troops out from the coalition army and withdrew to Dunkirk. Allied forces under Eugene of Savoy then suffered a major defeat at the Battle of Denain in the absence of the British. Despite a concerted opposition campaign, Harley was able to pass the Peace of Utrecht through Parliament. This involved the creation of twelve peers, known as Harley's Dozen, in a single day to tilt the balance of the Whig-dominated House of Lords.

Another major issue that divided the country was the coming succession dispute that would follow the anticipated death of the childless Queen Anne. While some Hanoverian Tories were committed to the German succession, others favoured the Jacobite claimant, Anne's half-brother James. Harley remained in contact with the exiled court at Saint-Germain and might have favoured James had he been prepared to convert from Catholicism to the Church of England, but Harley's general position was to sit on the fence.

On Anne's death in August 1714, partisans of the Hanoverian Succession were able to secure the throne for George I. As Elector of Hanover, George had been one of Britain's allies who felt betrayed by the secret peace deal and publicly snubbed Harley on his arrival.

== Impeachment ==
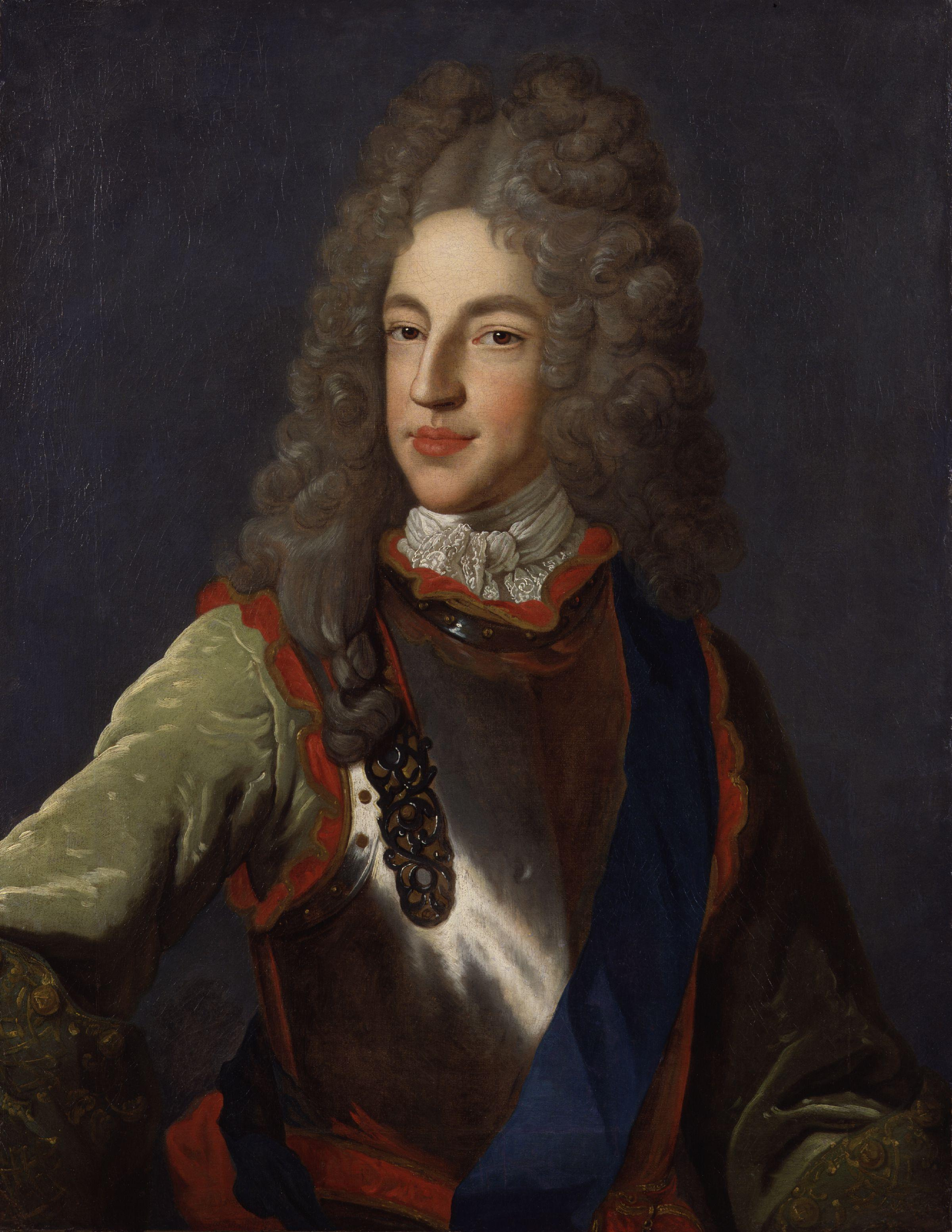
Harley was accused of conspiring with the Jacobite claimant James Stuart.

In early 1715 fresh elections gave the Whigs a majority, and they set about pursuing those regarded responsible for the peace as well as conspiring to place James on the throne. Facing imminent arrest, Ormonde and Bolingbroke both fled to the Continent. Harley was the most prominent figure left to target, along with lesser figures in the peace talks such as Matthew Prior and Lord Strafford.

On 13 April the Commons appointed a committee of twenty-one members to conduct the investigation including prominent Whigs Robert Walpole, James Stanhope, Nicholas Lechmere and Edward Wortley Montagu. In Parliament the motion to impeach Harley was brought by Thomas Coningsby, a figure described as the "Whig Hangman". As two of the major landowning families in Herefordshire, the Coningsbys and Harleys had a long-standing rivalry stretching back generations. Coningsby had already suggested claimed in the Commons that Harley had fled the country, something that was denied by Edward Harley, Robert's brother, who was also an MP.

On 10 June Walpole moved that the absent Bolingbroke be charged with high treason, while Coningsby did the same against Harley. The House agreed to send the matter back to the committee so that the impeachment could be drawn up. This was done on 7 July with sixteen articles against Harley, and the impeachment now passed over to the House of Lords. Coningsby was selected to carry the terms of the impeachment to the Lords and advocated for their conviction.

Most of the articles related to Harley's role in the Utrecht peace but one article focused on his "unprecedented" creation of twelve peers in 1711– 12. He was also criticised for receiving the exiled Jacobite Irishman Patrick Lawless as the ambassador of Spain. In his defence Harley observed that some of the things he was charged with were not his responsibility, and that if he were held accountable so potentially would all future first ministers. On 16 July 1715, the Lords voted 82 to 50 to imprison him awaiting his trial. For two days he was under house arrest before being moved to the Tower of London. Two weeks later Coningsby advanced six further articles, alleging that Harley had given the Queen "evil advice" and been secretly working for James.

== Imprisonment ==
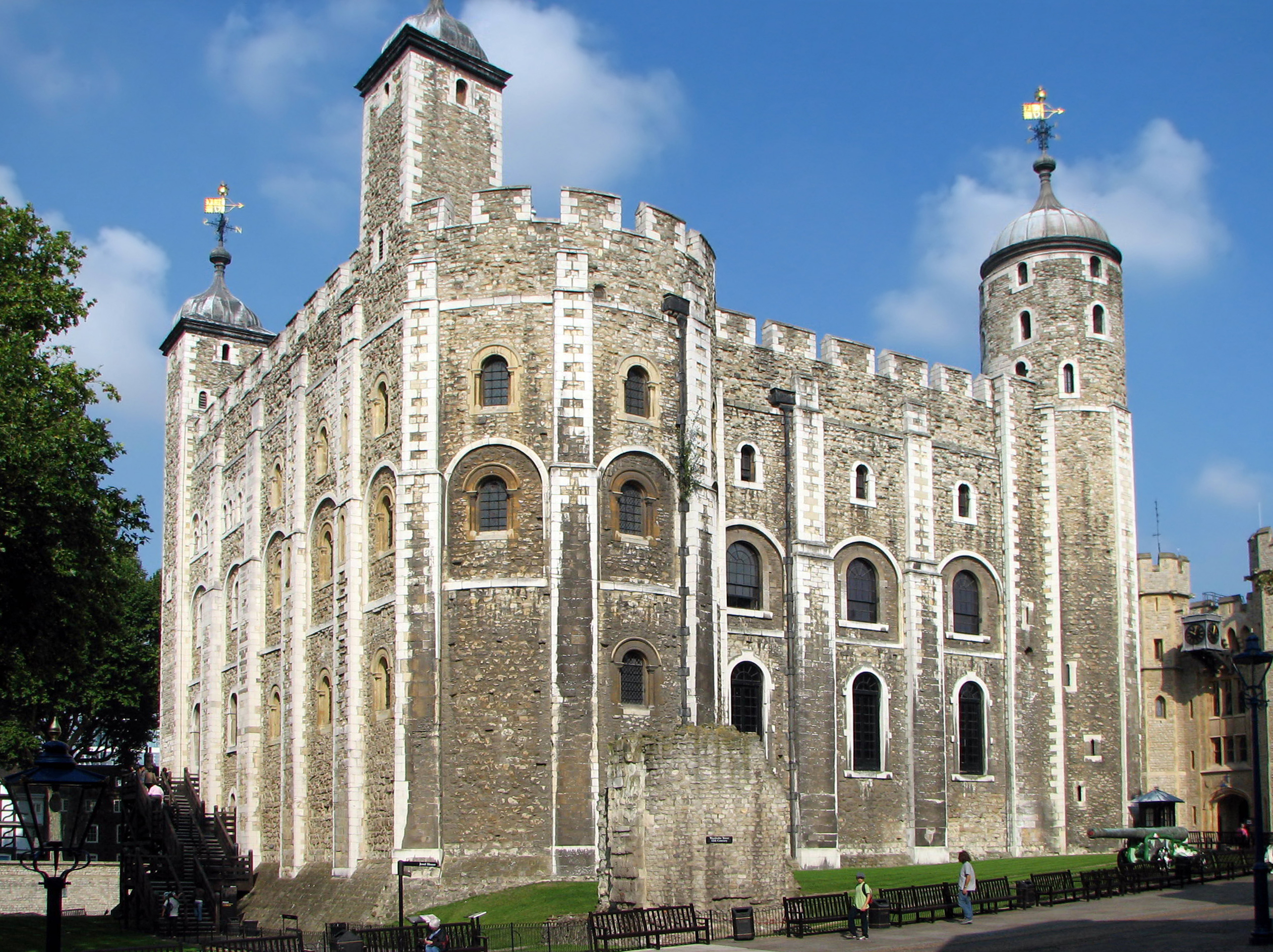
Harley spent his two years imprisonment in the Tower of London.

Despite the seriousness of the charge, Harley's lodgings in the Tower were fairly comfortable, as was common for noblemen. Despite his bad health he was prepared for any outcome. As treason was a capital crime, Harley was potentially facing the death penalty. A "paper war" raged outside Parliament as writers and journalists portrayed the trial from different perspectives. While John Dunton wrote an attack on the former First Minister, both Daniel Defoe and Jonathan Swift published accounts of the events designed to vindicate Harley's conduct.

While in the Tower, Harley's already poor health grew worse. He suffered from rheumatism and likely also pneumonia. His wife was permitted to stay and nurse him, until she also fell ill.

A month after Harley was imprisoned, his former Scottish Secretary raised the banner of the exiled James at Braemar in the Scottish Highlands. The ensuing Jacobite rebellion broke out in Scotland and spread to Northern England. Planned risings in southern England and Ireland were stalled by arrests. Two battles at Sheriffmuir in Scotland and Preston in England halted the early momentum of the Jacobites.

The ensuing panic led to further accusations against Harley that he was complicit in the current rebellion. However, this may have saved his life as it led to a long delay in the prosecution of his case, as it was overtaken by the need to deal with the fallout of the rising. By early 1716 the rebellion was defeated. Several of its leaders were lodged in the Tower at the same time as Harley, and some, including the Earl of Derwentwater, were executed there. However, the very fact that Harley was imprisoned at the time spared him from accusations of actively taking part of the rebellion, although Jacobite prisoners were quizzed on his connections to the movement.

Harley remained stoic and philosophical about his fate. Around this time he wrote to his wife, now living outside the Tower, that he was resolved to be "easy under any confinement, and as I look for no favour, so I shall do nothing towards my freedom, that may not become the character of an English gentleman". He pledged, "I will go out of this place with the same honour and innocence as I came into it".

== Release ==
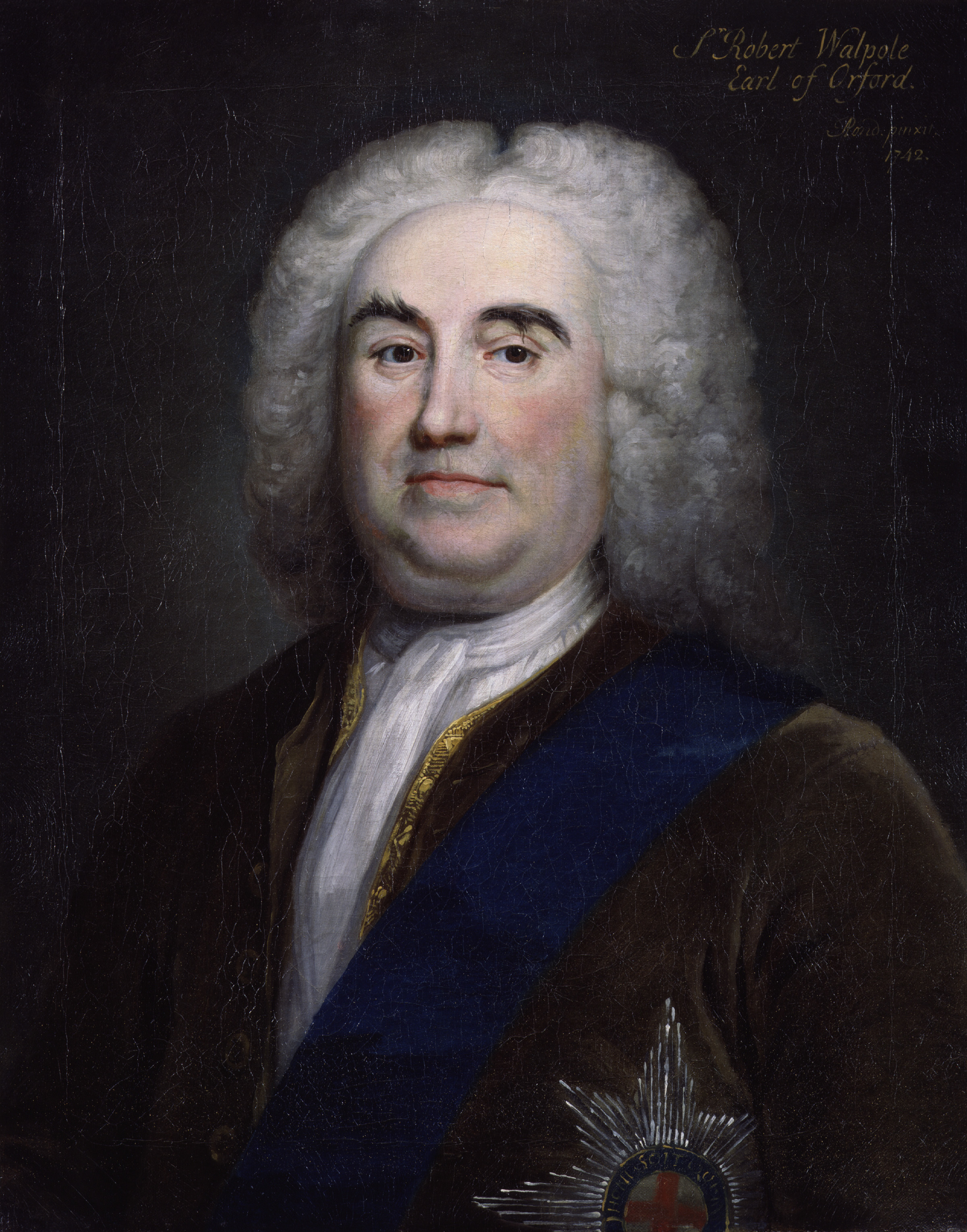
Robert Walpole's dispute with Whig leader James Stanhope saw him carry Opposition Whigs to join with Tories to vote to acquit Harley. Later as Prime Minister Walpole faced calls for his impeachment similar to those that Harley had confronted.

In April 1717 the Whig leadership, now completely dominant in British politics, suffered a major falling out when Lord Townshend was dismissed from the government after a power struggle with James Stanhope. His ally and brother-in-law Robert Walpole resigned along with his supporters, triggering the Whig Split. Walpole now sought to cultivate Tory support in his bid to build a strong opposition to the government. To try and head this off, the government Whigs sought to try and secure from Harley a statement of his future good conduct in exchange for his release. As he felt this implied he was not innocent, he refused this offer.

In May 1717, Harley's supporters brought forward a motion that his either a trial should be held or he should be released. Walpole was still a member of the committee delegated to investigate Harley's case. He now assured Harley's ally William Bromley that he would work to halt the impeachment. Another Harley backer, Lord Harcourt, moved that the House should first consider the more serious charge of High Treason, rather than the lesser high crimes and misdemeanors. This wrongfooted the government, who had not prepared any evidence on this issue.

By the set trial date of 24 June the government was not ready to present its case. Harcourt then moved that the Harley should be discharged. This led to lengthy debates in both the Lords and the Commons, where Whig Thomas Miller demanded that Harley should be punished for abandoning the Catalans, who without British help had been defeated at Barcelona. In his final intervention in Parliament, the Duke of Marlborough, who had suffered a stroke the previous year, voted against Harley. However the Lords chose to acquit Harley on 1 July, and he was released.

== Aftermath ==
King George showed his own feelings, by immediately banishing Harley from attending him at court. Harley largely retired from political life, dedicating himself to his artistic and literary interests until his death in 1724. Although Walpole himself later faced the threat of impeachment during the later stages of his government, this was not carried through. Harley was the last British chief minister to be impeached.

Alexander Pope, a supporter of Harley, later wrote his Epistle to Bathurst that recalled the case. It dwells on the fall of a fictional politician and contains the line "The House impeach him, Coningsby harangues".

== Bibliography ==
- Bullard, Rebecca. The Politics of Disclosure, 1674-1725: Secret History Narratives. Routledge, 2015.
- Hamilton, Elizabeth. The Backstairs Dragon: A Life of Robert Harley, Earl of Oxford. Hamish Hamilton, 1969.
- Hill, Brian W. Robert Harley. Speaker, Secretary of State and Premier Minister. Yale University Press, 1998.
- Pearce, Edward. The Great Man: Sir Robert Walpole: Scoundrel, Genius and Britain's First Prime Minister. Random House, 2011.
- Rogers, Pat. The Life and Times of Thomas, Lord Coningsby: The Whig Hangman and his Victims. A&C Black, 2011.
