= David Brand, 5th Viscount Hampden =

English cricketer, peer, army officer, and banker

Lieutenant Colonel The Right Honourable The Viscount Hampden
- Brand in 1922

Personal information
- Full name: David Francis Brand
- Born: 14 June 1902; Westminster, Middlesex, England
- Died: 4 September 1975 (aged 73); Glynde, East Sussex, England
- Batting: Right-handed
- Bowling: Right-arm medium-pace
- Relatives: Thomas Brand, 3rd Viscount Hampden (father); Thomas Brand, 4th Viscount Hampden (brother); Anthony Brand, 6th Viscount Hampden (son)

Domestic team information
- Years: Team
- 1922: Cambridge University

Career statistics
Competition	First-class
Matches	14
Runs scored	246
Batting average	15.37
100s/50s	0/1
Top score	60
Balls bowled	1419
Wickets	27
Bowling average	28.03
5 wickets in innings	0
10 wickets in match	0
Best bowling	4/31
Catches/stumpings	5/0
- Source: CricketArchive, 25 February 2017

Lieutenant Colonel David Francis Brand, 5th Viscount Hampden (14 June 1902 – 4 September 1975) was an English peer, cricketer, army officer and banker.

== Family and early life ==
David Brand was the second son of Thomas Brand, who succeeded to the Viscountcy of Hampden in 1906. David's grandfather, Henry Brand, 2nd Viscount Hampden, was Governor of New South Wales from 1895 to 1899. David's elder brother Thomas succeeded their father as Viscount Hampden in 1958.

David attended Eton College, where he captained the First XI in 1921. He went up to Trinity College, Cambridge, but played only one first-class match for the university team, in May 1922. He spent the 1922–23 university year on a tour of Ceylon, Australia and New Zealand with the Marylebone Cricket Club. His highest first-class score was 60 in the second match against New South Wales, and his best bowling figures were 4 for 31 in the first match against Auckland. He played no further first-class cricket after the tour.

== Later life ==
Brand married the Hon. Imogen Alice Rhys (1903–2001), daughter of Walter Rice, 7th Baron Dynevor, in 1936. They had three children: Anthony David, Jean Margaret, and Philippa Mary Imogen.

In the Second World War, serving with the Hertfordshire Regiment, he gained the rank of lieutenant-colonel. He served in Burma, and was mentioned in despatches. After the war he was chairman of the English, Scottish and Australian Bank and later deputy chairman of the ANZ Bank.

Brand succeeded his brother Thomas to the Viscountcy of Hampden in 1965. When he died in 1975 the title passed to his son Anthony.

Peerage of the United Kingdom
Preceded by Thomas Brand	Viscount Hampden; 2nd creation 1965–1975	Succeeded by Anthony Brand
