= Thomas Brand, 4th Viscount Hampden =

British peer

- Born: 30 March 1900; Montagu House, Whitehall
- Died: 17 October 1965 (aged 65)
- Spouse: Leila Seely (m. 1923)
- Children: 4, including Rachel
- Father: Thomas Brand
- Relatives: David Brand (brother); Henry Brand (grandfather); William Montagu-Douglas-Scott (grandfather)
- Military career
- Service: British Army
- Rank: Lieutenant
- Unit: Rifle Brigade
- Wars: World War II

Thomas Henry Brand, 4th Viscount Hampden CMG (30 March 1900 – 17 October 1965) was a British and English peer, both Baron Dacre (dating from 1307) and Viscount Hampden.

== Biography ==
Brand was the eldest son of soldier and courtier Thomas Brand, 3rd Viscount Hampden, and of his wife Lady Katharine Mary Montagu-Douglas-Scott, a daughter of the 6th Duke of Buccleuch, and was born 30 March 1900 at the home of his maternal grandfather, Montagu House in London. He was educated at Eton, holding the office of Page of Honour to King George V between 1913 and 1916. After Eton, he joined the British Army and was commissioned as a Lieutenant into the Rifle Brigade.

On 26 July 1923, he married Leila, daughter of Lieutenant-Colonel Frank Seely, of Ramsdale Park, Nottinghamshire and son of Sir Charles Seely, 1st Baronet. They had four daughters, Sarah Elizma (1924–1937), Gian Katherine (1927–1929), Rachel Leila (1929–2012), and Tessa Mary (1934-2020).

In 1931 he became Managing Director of Lazard Brothers & Co. During the Second World War he served as Chief Executive Officer on the British side of the Combined Production and Resources Board, from 1942 to 1944, then from 1944 to 1945 was Chairman of Supplies for Liberated Areas Official Committee. He was appointed CMG in 1943, and in 1953 and 1954 was Chairman of the Issuing Houses Association. He succeeded to his father's titles in 1958 and in 1965 became Chairman of Lazards.

After Hampden's death on 17 October 1965 his brother David succeeded as Viscount Hampden, while his two surviving daughters were left as co-heiresses to the Barony of Dacre, which thus went into abeyance. However, the abeyance was terminated in 1970 in favour of his elder surviving daughter Rachel Douglas-Home, 27th Baroness Dacre.

Court offices
| Preceded by Anthony Lowther | Page of Honour; 1913–1916 | Succeeded by Edward Ponsonby |
Peerage of the United Kingdom
| Preceded by Thomas Brand | Viscount Hampden; 2nd creation 1958–1965 | Succeeded by David Brand |
Peerage of England
| Preceded by Thomas Brand | Baron Dacre; 1st creation 1958–1965 | In abeyance Title next held by Rachel Douglas-Home |
