= Peerage Bill =

Proposed British law of 1719

- Bill
- Parliament of Great Britain
- Long title: An Act for the Settling the Peerage of Great Britain
- Introduced by: Charles Seymour, 6th Duke of Somerset (Lords)

Status: Not passed

The Peerage Bill was a 1719 measure proposed by the British Whig government led by James Stanhope, 1st Earl Stanhope, and Charles Spencer, 3rd Earl of Sunderland, which would have largely halted the creation of new peerages, limiting membership of the House of Lords.

It was inspired by a desire to prevent a repeat of the 1711 creation of twelve Tory peers, known widely as "Harley's Dozen", in order to secure the passage of the peace treaty with France through the Whig-dominated Lords. Following the Whig Split of 1717 there was also a wish to stop the Prince of Wales who backed the renegade Whigs, once he became King, from packing the house with his own supporters.

The proposal had an attraction to existing aristocrats both Tory and Whig. However, Robert Walpole rallied opposition to it and successfully appealed to MPs by arguing the bill would deny them and their families the opportunity of ever being allowed to join the aristocracy. He also mocked Stanhope, who had recently been made a Lord, for being "desirous to shut the door after him". Tories also strongly opposed the measure, including Robert Harley who criticised the proposal as potentially undermining Britain's constitution.

The bill led to a public dispute between Joseph Addison and Richard Steele, former friends and collaborators on The Spectator and both Whig members of the Kit-Kat Club. Addison supported the Bill while Steele opposed it.

The bill was introduced in the House of Lords by Charles Seymour, 6th Duke of Somerset and received its first reading on 25 November 1719, its second reading on 26 November 1719, amended by the Committee of the Whole House on 27 November 1719, passed its report stage and was engrossed on 28 November, and passed the Lords on 30 November.

On 1 December 1719, the House of Commons voted 203 to 58 to give the Bill a first reading, however, at its second reading on 8 December 1719 the Commons voted 269 to 177 not to commit the Bill. The following year Walpole and his opposition Whig allies rejoined the government, ending the party's split. Membership of the house gradually expanded over the century, and Walpole himself joined the house as Lord Orford in 1742 following his record 21 years as prime minister.

== Bibliography ==
- Black, Jermey. Walpole in Power. Sutton Publishing, 2001.
- Field, Ophelia. The Kit-Cat Club: Friends who Imagined a Nation. Harper Collins, 2008.
- Hamilton, Elizabeth. The Backstairs Dragon: A Life of Robert Harley, Earl of Oxford. Hamilton, 1969.
- Hill, Brian W. The Early Parties and Politics in Britain, 1688–1832. Macmillan, 1996.
- Pearce, Edward. The Great Man: Sir Robert Walpole: Scoundrel, Genius and Britain's First Prime Minister. Random House, 2011.
