= Thomas Brand, 3rd Viscount Hampden =

British peer and soldier (1869–1958)

Brigadier-General The Right Honourable The Viscount Hampden GCVO KCB CMG KStJ JP DL
- Portrait by Walter Stoneman, 1930

Lord Lieutenant of Hertfordshire
- In office 9 February 1915 – 1952
- Monarchs: George V; Edward VIII; George VI; Elizabeth II
- Preceded by: The Earl of Clarendon
- Succeeded by: David Bowes-Lyon

Personal details
- Born: Thomas Walter Brand; 29 January 1869 London, England
- Died: 4 September 1958 (aged 89)
- Spouse: Lady Katharine Mary Montagu-Douglas-Scott (m. 1899)
- Children: 8, including Thomas and David
- Parent: Henry Brand (father)
- Education: Eton College
- Alma mater: Trinity College, Cambridge

Military service
- Allegiance: United Kingdom
- Branch/service: British Army
- Years of service: 1889–1919
- Rank: Brigadier-General
- Unit: Hertfordshire Regiment
- Commands: 185th (2/1st West Riding) Brigade (1916–1918); 126th (East Lancashire) Brigade (1915–1916); 1st Battalion Hertfordshire Regiment (1913–1915)
- Battles/wars: Second Boer War; First World War; Gallipoli campaign; Battle of Cambrai
- Awards: Knight Grand Cross of the Royal Victorian Order; Knight Commander of the Order of the Bath; Companion of the Order of St Michael and St George; Knight of the Order of St John; Mentioned in Despatches (9); Legion of Honour (France)

Brigadier-General Thomas Walter Brand, 3rd Viscount Hampden, GCVO, KCB, CMG, KStJ, JP, DL (29 January 1869 – 4 September 1958) was a British peer and soldier, the son of the 2nd Viscount Hampden.

== Education ==
Born in Westminster, he was educated at Eton College and Trinity College, Cambridge.

== Marriage and family ==
On 29 April 1899, he married Lady Katharine Mary Montagu-Douglas-Scott (a daughter of the 6th Duke of Buccleuch), and they had eight children. He was succeeded first by his eldest son Thomas (two surviving daughters, the eldest, Rachel, inherited the Barony of Dacre in 1970 from her father) and then by his second son in the viscountcy, David.

== Military career ==
Brand was commissioned a second lieutenant on 20 November 1889, promoted to a lieutenant on 10 June 1891, and to captain on 16 February 1898. He served as an officer in the Hertfordshire Regiment, then transferred to the 10th Royal Hussars.

He saw active service in Southern Africa during the Second Boer War from 1899 to 1902, during which he received a brevet promotion to major on 29 November 1900. From July 1901 he was adjutant of the Sussex Imperial Yeomanry.

He received the substantive rank of major on 14 January 1903, and was later the same year appointed 2nd in command of the 2nd Provisional Regiment of Hussars. From 1905 he was private secretary to Earl Cawdor; then a brigade major in the British Armed Forces from 1908 to 1910. Later he served as commanding officer of the 1st Battalion from February 1913.

Following the outbreak of the First World War, the Hertfordshires were deployed to the Western Front and Brand remained in command until January 1915. Subsequently, he was promoted to brigadier general in June 1915 and was appointed to command the 126th (East Lancashire) Brigade at Gallipoli, the 6th Mounted Brigade with the Western Frontier Force and later the 185th (2/1st West Riding) Brigade at the Battle of Cambrai and the battles of 1918.

Between 1935 and 1939, he was colonel of the 10th Royal Hussars.

== Other interests ==
In 1899, he played in the first international polo match between England and Australia in Melbourne alongside George Bellew-Bryan, 4th Baron Bellew.

Military offices
| Preceded by The Viscount Byng of Vimy | Colonel of the 10th Royal Hussars (Prince of Wales's Own); 1935–1939 | Succeeded by Victor Greenwood |
Honorary titles
| Preceded by The Earl of Clarendon | Lord Lieutenant of Hertfordshire; 1915–1952 | Succeeded by Sir David Bowes-Lyon |
Peerage of the United Kingdom
| Preceded by Henry Brand | Viscount Hampden; 2nd creation 1906–1958 | Succeeded by Thomas Brand |
