= Harley's Dozen =

Event in British politics

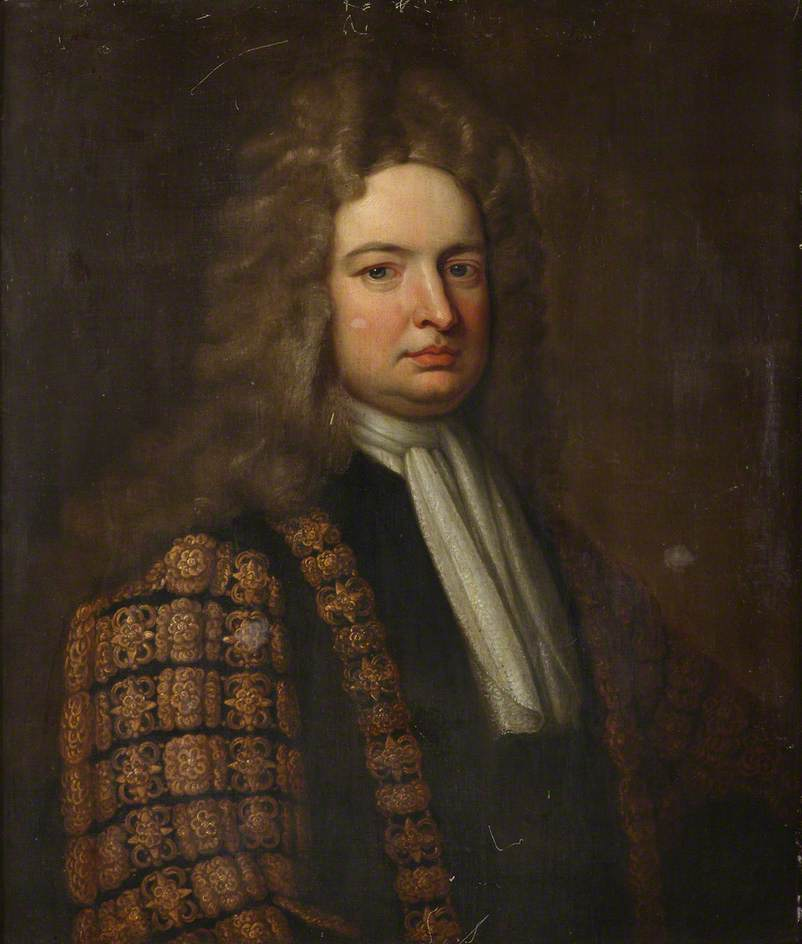
Robert Harley in 1711

Harley's Dozen were twelve new peerages created in December 1711 by the British Tory government of Robert Harley which was struggling to gain a majority in the Whig-dominated House of Lords. This came at a time when the government were negotiating peace terms to end the ongoing War of the Spanish Succession, which were unlikely to pass the Lords where opposition Whigs and some Tories had joined to block them under the slogan "No Peace Without Spain".

== Creation ==
Two of the men, Lord Bruce and Lord Compton, were heirs to existing earldoms and were advanced to the House of Lords in their own right using their father's baronies. Others included Harley's son-in-law George Hay as well as George Granville, Thomas Mansel, Thomas Trevor, Thomas Foley all of whom were close political allies of the First Minister. Most controversial was that of Samuel Masham, the husband of Queen Anne's favourite Abigail Hill, a cousin and ally of Harley. While Bruce's letters patent were dated 31 December 1711, the other creations all took place on the subsequent day 1 January 1712. When Parliament resumed on 2 January they took their seats. Because their numbers resembled that of a jury, the Whig Lord Wharton mockingly asked if they were going to speak individually or elect a foreman to do so.

== Aftermath ==
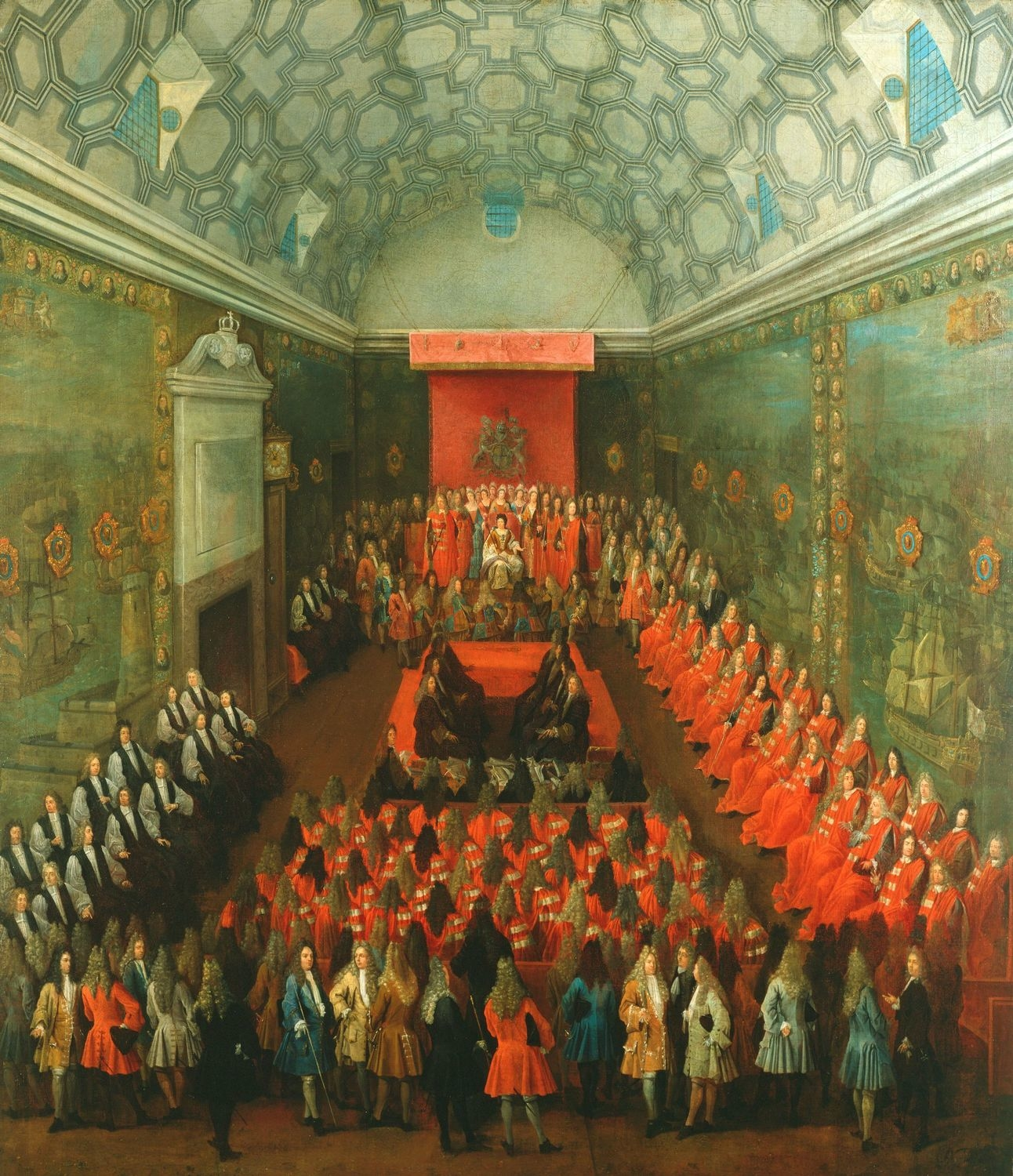
House of Lords being addressed by Queen Anne

Despite the controversy Harley was able to subsequently pass the Treaty of Utrecht in 1713. However, the narrow Tory majority in the Lords disappeared in 1714 following the Hanoverian Succession when the Tory government was replaced by George I. Harley's alleged abuse of royal power and the violation of the constitution were part of the articles of impeachment against him, when he was prosecuted by Parliament in 1715.

In 1719 partly in a response to Harley's earlier creations, the Whig government of James Stanhope proposed a Peerage Bill which would have largely limited further expansion of the House of Lords. However, this was defeated and the size of the Lords continued to grow during the eighteenth century.

== Full list of the new peers ==
- Allen Bathurst, created Baron Bathurst
- Charles Bruce, Viscount Bruce of Ampthill, created Baron Bruce by acceleration
- James Compton, Lord Compton, created Baron Compton by acceleration
- Thomas Foley, created Baron Foley
- George Granville, created Baron Landsdowne
- George Hay, Viscount Dupplin, created Baron Hay
- Sir Thomas Mansel, 5th Baronet, created Baron Mansel
- Samuel Masham, created Baron Masham
- Henry Paget, created Baron Burton
- Thomas Trevor, created Baron Trevor
- Sir Thomas Willoughby, 2nd Baronet, created Baron Middleton
- Thomas Windsor, 1st Viscount Windsor, created Baron Mountjoy (Viscount Windsor was a title in the Peerage of Ireland, which did not entitle its holder to a seat in the British House of Lords.)

== Bibliography ==
- Colley, Linda. In Defiance of Oligarchy: The Tory Party 1714-60. Cambridge University Press, 1985.
- Hill, Brian W. Robert Harley. Speaker, Secretary of State and Premier Minister. Yale University Press, 1998.
- Jones, Clyve. Pillar of the Constitution: The House of Lords in British Politics, 1640-1784. Bloomsbury Publishing, 2010.
- Rogers, The Life and Times of Thomas, Lord Coningsby: The Whig Hangman and His Victims. A&C Black, 2011.
