= List of diplomats of the United Kingdom to Sardinia =

Below is an incomplete list of diplomats from the United Kingdom to Sardinia and its predecessor Savoy, specifically Heads of Missions.

== Heads of Missions ==
=== Ambassadors to Savoy ===
- 1611–1612: Henry Wotton
- 1614–1615: Sir Albertus Morton
- 1615–1624: Sir Isaac Wake (Resident Agent)
- 1671–1690: Marquis of St Thomas, John Finch and Sir William Soame
- 1691–1693: Edmund Poley
- 1693–1694: Dr William Aglionby
- 1693–1704: The Earl of Galway (absent from 1696) (Viscount Galway until 1697)
- 1699 and 1703–1706: Richard Hill
- 1706: Paul Methuen
- 1706–1713: John Chetwynd, later Viscount Chetwynd.
  - 1708–1713: Maj. Gen. Francis Palmes
- 1710–1713: Charles Mordaunt, 3rd Earl of Peterborough Special Mission 1710–1711; Minister Plenipotentiary 1712; Ambassador Extraordinary and Plenipotentiary 1713

In 1713, after the Treaty of Utrecht, Duke of Savoy, Victor Amadeus II became King of Sicily (until 1718, de jure until 1720)

- 1714: George St. John (died 1716 at Venice)
- 1713–1719: J. Payne, James Cockburn

In 1720, the House of Savoy acquired, after the Treaty of The Hague, the island of Sardinia, and their State was subsequently known as the Kingdom of Sardinia (even though Sardinia and Savoy remained legally separated as two different states until the Perfect Fusion in 1847).

=== Envoys Extraordinary and Ministers Plenipotentiary ===
- 1719–1725: John Molesworth
- 1726–1727: John Hedges Envoy Extraordinary
- 1728–1732: Edmund Allen in charge 1727–1728; Secretary 1728–1734
- 1731–1736: The Earl of Essex Minister Plenipotentiary 1731–1732; Ambassador 1732–1736
- 1736–1749: Arthur Villettes Resident
  - 1747: Lieut-Gen. Thomas Wentworth Special Mission
- 1749–1755: William Nassau de Zuylestein, 4th Earl of Rochford
- 1755–1758: The Earl of Bristol Envoy Extraordinary
- 1758–1761: James Stuart-Mackenzie Envoy Extraordinary 1758–1760; then Envoy Extraordinary and Plenipotentiary
- 1761–1768: George Pitt, 1st Baron Rivers
- 1768–1779: William Lynch Envoy Extraordinary 1768–1770; then Envoy Extraordinary and Plenipotentiary
- 1779–1783: John Stuart, Viscount Mountstuart
- 1783–1797: Hon. John Hampden-Trevor Envoy Extraordinary 1783–1789; then Envoy Extraordinary and Plenipotentiary
- 1798–1799: No representation due to the French occupation of Turin
- 1799–1806: Thomas Jackson
- Diplomatic relations suspended 1806–1808
- 1807–1824: Hon. William Hill
- 1824–1840: Augustus Foster
- 1840–1851: Hon. Ralph Abercromby
- 1852–1861: James Hudson

Hudson became in 1861 the first Envoy extraordinary and Minister Plenipotenziary to the Kingdom of Italy when the King of Sardinia, Victor Emmanuel II, changed his title in King of Italy. See also List of ambassadors of the United Kingdom to Italy.
