= Bromham, Bedfordshire =

Village in Bedfordshire, England

Coordinates: 52.1454°N 0.5298°W

Bromham
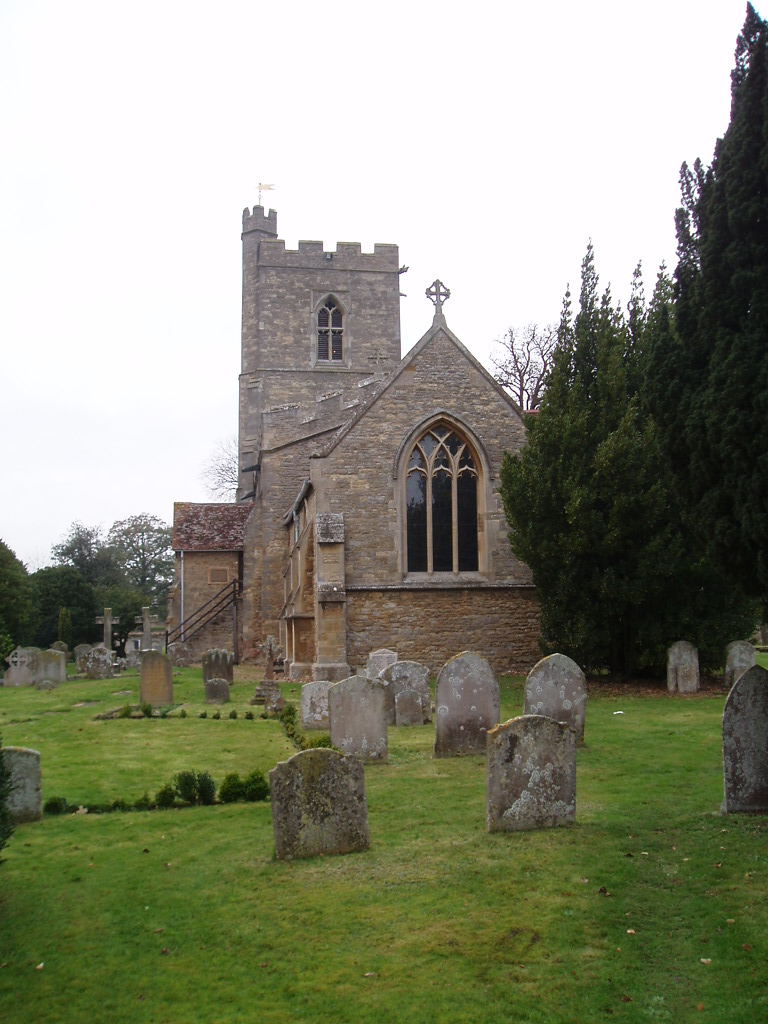
- Bromham Church

- Location within Bedfordshire
- Population: 4,957 (2011 Census)
- OS grid reference: TL007507
- Unitary authority: Bedford
- Ceremonial county: Bedfordshire
- Region: East
- Country: England
- Sovereign state: United Kingdom
- Post town: BEDFORD
- Postcode district: MK43
- Dialling code: 01234
- Police: Bedfordshire
- Fire: Bedfordshire
- Ambulance: East of England
- UK Parliament: North Bedfordshire

Bromham is a village and civil parish in the Borough of Bedford in Bedfordshire, England, situated around 3 miles (4.8 km) west of Bedford town centre.

== Toponymy ==
Bromham was first recorded as Bruneham in the Domesday Book of 1086. Other variants including Bruham (1164–1302), Braham (1227), Bramham (1228), Brumham (1262–87), Brunham (1276–91), Brumbham (1276), Brynham (1276), Broham (1278), Bronham (1338), Broam (1360), Brounham (1361) and Burnham (1361). The modern spelling is first recorded in 1227.

The name likely refers to the enclosed meadow on which the broom or the dyers' weed grew (at present no such flora can be found at that location).

Another theory as to the origin of the village's name means "Bruna's homestead".

== History ==
The land formed part of the Barony of Bedford held by the Beauchamps. After the Battle of Evesham, in which John de Beauchamp fell fighting on the side of the barons, the manor was held for a time by Prince Edward, but afterward divided among the Beauchamp female heirs. Bromham afterward passed successively into the hands of the Mowbrays, the Latimers, the Nevilles, the Passelowes, the Wildes and the Dyves. Early in the 18th century, the manor was bought by Sir Thomas Trevor, who was afterward created Lord Trevor, and whose mother was a daughter of John Hampden, the patriot. Three of his sons succeeded to the title. One of them – the third Lord Trevor – married Sir Richard Steele's daughter; and another – the fourth Lord Trevor – inherited the Great Hampden Estate in Bucks, through his grandmother, and was created Viscount Hampden. The Trevors became connected through marriage with the Rice family (the Dynevor Rices) and at the death of the late Miss Rice Trevor the estate passed to the Wingfields.

== Events ==
Bromham plays host to several social events through the year, including the Bromham Mill Duck Race.

== Notable features ==
Features include a watermill (Bromham Mill, now open to the public), the Church of St Owen, and a medieval bridge over the River Great Ouse that carried the main road over the river on 26 arches, until it was bypassed by the A428 road in 1986.

The watermill may be referred to in the Domesday Book of 1086, and the Vikings navigated the Great Ouse a long time ago. The mill was extensively restored in 1980 by Warwickshire millwrights Gormley and Goodman, to the extent that it was able to grind wheat for flour again for the first time that year since it ceased work in 1939. Alterations to the weir below the mill's leat shortly afterwards caused a reduction to the height of the head-race, resulting in poorer performance from the mill's impulse water-wheel.

== Location ==
The parish is for the greater part enclosed in a bend in the Great Ouse, and it touches the parishes of Oakley, Biddenham, Kempston, Stagsden, Stevington and at its western point, Turvey. It is to the west of Bedford.

== Notable people ==
- Thomas Trevor, 1st Baron Trevor (1657/58–1730), Attorney general and Lord Privy Seal
- Thomas Trevor, 2nd Baron Trevor (1692–1753)
- Matt Berry (born 1974), actor and musician
