= Richard Trevor (bishop) =

English bishop (1707–1771)

The Right Reverend Richard Trevor
- Bishop of Durham
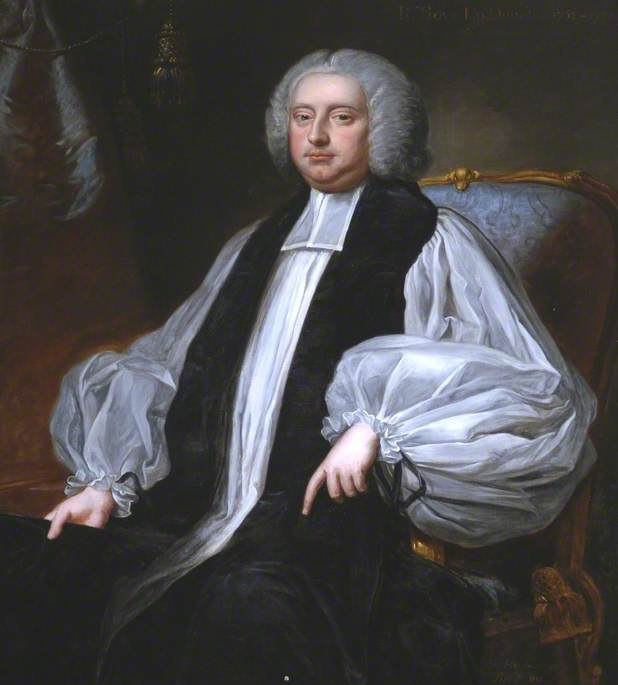
- Diocese: Diocese of Durham
- In office: 1752–1771 (death)
- Predecessor: Joseph Butler
- Successor: John Egerton
- Other post: Bishop of St Davids (1744–52)

Orders
- Ordination: 1731
- Consecration: 1 April 1744

Personal details
- Born: 30 September 1707 Peckham, Surrey
- Died: 9 June 1771 (aged 63) London
- Buried: Glynde, Sussex
- Denomination: Anglican
- Residence: Auckland Castle (official); Glynde Place (family)
- Parents: Thomas Trevor, 1st Baron Trevor
- Education: All Souls' College, Oxford

Richard Trevor (30 September 1707 – 9 June 1771) was an English prelate of Welsh descent, who served as bishop of St Davids from 1744 to 1752 and bishop of Durham from 1752 until his death.

== Life ==
Trevor was born Peckham in Surrey, the youngest surviving son of Thomas Trevor, 1st Baron Trevor and his second wife, Anne. He was educated at Bishop's Stortford, then at Westminster School and at The Queen's College, Oxford, before becoming a fellow of All Souls in 1727. In 1731, he proceeded by seniority to Master of Arts (Oxford) and was ordained. His half-brother Thomas Trevor, 2nd Baron Trevor presented him to Houghton-with-Wilton in 1731 and he became a canon of Christ Church, Oxford on 8 November 1735.

Trevor was appointed Bishop of St Davids in 1744, consecrated a bishop on 1 April 1744, and elected to Durham on 9 November 1752. He was jokingly called 'St Durham' by Horace Walpole and his associates due to his reputation for saintliness, and on his death he bequeathed £3,450 to charities and the poor in the areas in which he had lived. Trevor was also concerned with maintaining high standards among the clerics he appointed.

Trevor was also a builder, remodelling Auckland Castle, the bishop of Durham's palace, as well as his residence at Glynde Place in Sussex, where he also rebuilt the church. A statue of Bishop Trevor was placed in the Bishop's Chapel at Bishop Auckland in 1775 by Joseph Nollekens.

== Legacy ==
After his death, the estate of Glynde passed to his elder brother, Robert Hampden-Trevor, 1st Viscount Hampden.

=== Art collection ===
Trevor was a supporter of the Jewish Naturalisation Act 1753. This interest in Jewish causes is reflected in his purchase in 1756 of 12 paintings by the 17th-century Spanish artist Zurbarán from a series known as Jacob and his twelve sons, depicting the Old Testament patriarch Jacob and his sons. They were installed at Auckland Castle, a property of the Bishops of Durham, and remained in the ownership of the Church of England until 2011, when they were transferred, along with the castle, to a charitable trust backed by philanthropist Jonathan Ruffer,

== Gallery ==
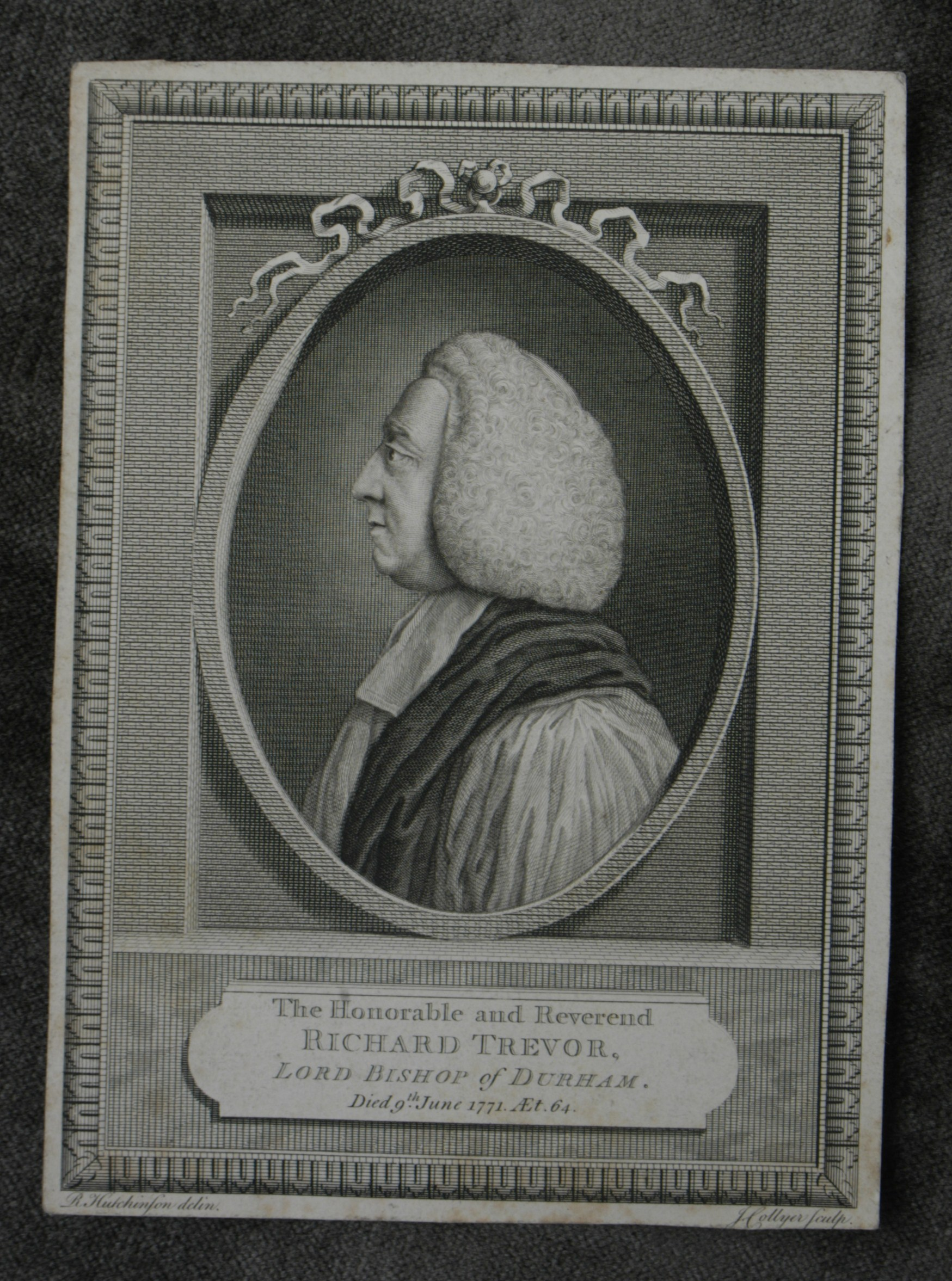
The Honourable and Reverend Richard Trevor, Lord Bishop of Durham; an engraving by Joseph Collyer, modeled after a drawing by R. Hutchinson

Arms of Trevor: Party per bend sinister ermine and ermines, a lion rampant or

Church of England titles
Preceded by Edward Willes	Bishop of St David's; 1744–1752	Succeeded by Anthony Ellis
Preceded by Joseph Butler	Bishop of Durham; 1752–1771	Succeeded by John Egerton
