= Yorkshire Radio =

Defunct radio station in Leeds, England

Coordinates: 53.778°N 1.570°W

Yorkshire; England
- Frequencies: DAB: 12A; Sky: 0209

Programming
- Format: Pop music, sports

Ownership
- Owner: Leeds United A.F.C.

History
- First air date: 10 July 2006
- Last air date: 30 July 2013

Links
- Website: www.yorkshireradio.net

Yorkshire Radio was a British digital radio station serving Yorkshire on DAB. The station was owned by Leeds United A.F.C. and broadcast live coverage of all first-team games, alongside pop music from the 1960s to 2013.

== History ==
Yorkshire Radio began test transmissions on 26 June 2006 and launched on 10 July 2006 on the MXR Yorkshire multiplex, replacing jazzfm.com. The first and last song to be played on the station was I Predict a Riot by Leeds band the Kaiser Chiefs.

The station's studios were based at Lowfields Road, behind the east stand of Leeds United's stadium, Elland Road in the Centenary Pavilion. Alongside Leeds United commentaries, Yorkshire Radio also carried coverage of Super League, Leeds Carnegie RUFC and Yorkshire County Cricket Club.

The station closed at 6 pm on 30 July 2013.

On 16 December 2013, broadcasting regulator Ofcom partly upheld a complaint on behalf of former Leeds United director Melvyn Levi, who alleged that Yorkshire Radio had treated him unfairly in a number of broadcasts.
