= Helen Mayhew =

British radio presenter and producer

Helen Mayhew is a British radio presenter and producer, specialising in jazz music. Mayhew started with the BBC, and then moved to 102.2 Jazz FM at its launch, then rejoined the BBC where she presented her own weekly show, and finally returned to the relaunched Jazz FM. She is also vice-president of the National Youth Jazz Collective.

== Early career ==
Mayhew's broadcasting career began at BBC Radio Devon and BBC Radio Kent, presenting and producing a wide range of programmes. She was one of the original presenters on Jazz FM when it began broadcasting in 1990, where she devised and presented the Dinner Jazz programme, broadcast on weekday evenings from 7–9 pm.

Also at Jazz FM, she presented and produced many other programmes including blues, jazz-dance music, new releases, and Latin music.

== BBC ==
Mayhew joined BBC Radio 2 in July 2004, presenting the Monday evening Big Band Special, Mondays 10-10.30 pm featuring the BBC Big Band. In September 2004, she took over her own weekly show, which she described as "A chill-out zone with a difference featuring music perfect for dreaming away the small hours. This aired every Saturday night/Sunday morning from 1–4 am.

Mayhew also occasionally presented the Jazz Line Up programme on BBC Radio 3, on Saturdays from 4–5 pm.

== theJazz and Classic FM ==
Her roles on Radio 2 ended in April 2006, and she made her final appearance on Radio 3 in February 2007. She joined GCap-owned theJazz in April 2007. She then went on to be heard on Classic FM every Monday-Friday from 12 midnight-2 am presenting the now defunct Classic FM Jazz programme.

== Current work ==
Mayhew came back to the relaunched Jazz FM in 2009 to co-present the Dinner Jazz programme with Sarah Ward, which expanded to six nights a week and is currently broadcast between 7 pm and 10 pm. As of 2023, she presents Late Night Jazz at 10pm for three hours on Thursdays and Fridays.

In addition to her 'day-job' in radio, she is also a club DJ, playing jazzy dance music.

Further to that, she is the current voice of next stop announcements onboard Brighton & Hove buses since 2011 and onboard Metrobus buses since 2019.
