= Love Supreme Jazz Festival =

UK music festival

- Status: Active
- Genre: Music festival
- Frequency: Annual (1st weekend of July)
- Venue: Glynde Place
- Locations: Glynde, East Sussex
- Country: England
- Inaugurated: 2013
- Founder: Ciro Romano
- Attendance: 40,000
- Organiser: Neapolitan Music
- Website: lovesupremefestival.com

The Love Supreme Jazz Festival is a three-day greenfield music festival held annually on the first weekend of July in Glynde Place in the South Downs of East Sussex.

It includes a spectrum of musical styles adjacent to jazz, such as funk, soul, blues and hip-hop. Love Supreme comprises five stages: The Main Stage, which focuses on broader styles of R&B, Funk, Soul and Blues; The Big Top, which plays host to the biggest names in Jazz and its neighbouring styles; The Arena, which hosts contemporary and progressive acts in the jazz sphere and The Bandstand, which hosts up and coming acts as well as local performers. The latest addition is Bands & Voices, which showcases a range of spoken word, dance and cabaret.

Since its launch in 2013, the festival has hosted artists such as Hugh Masekela, Herbie Hancock, Ms. Lauryn Hill, Earth, Wind and Fire, Grace Jones, Van Morrison, Gladys Knight, Laura Mvula, Jamie Cullum, The Cinematic Orchestra, George Benson, Chick Corea, Steve Winwood, Nile Rodgers, Louie Vega, Esperanza Spalding, Elvis Costello, Brad Mehldau, Robert Glasper, Mahalia, Gregory Porter, Lianne La Havas, Tom Misch, Mavis Staples, Pharoah Sanders and many others. Love Supreme has also been a crucial platform for younger and less established acts to develop their audiences, especially new jazz acts.

Love Supreme is produced by Neapolitan Music and U-Live, and was founded by former lawyer and record executive Ciro Romano.

== History ==
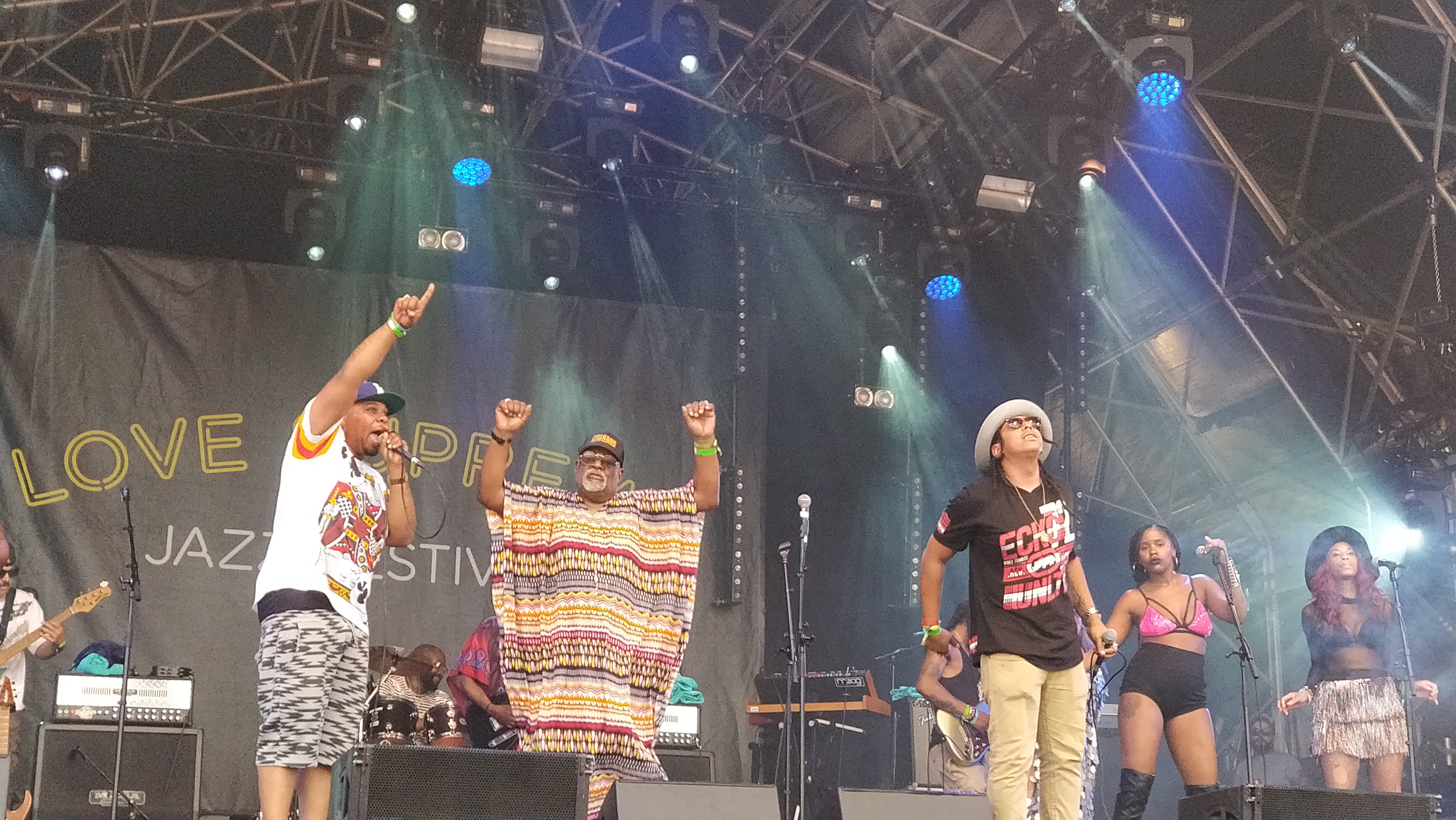
George Clinton's Parliament/Funkadelic performing at the 2018 Love Supreme Jazz Festival.

=== 2025 ===
The 2025 festival is scheduled for July 4–6, 2025. The lineup is scheduled to include Jacob Collier, Maxwell (musician), Nile Rodgers & Chic (band), The Roots, Smokey Robinson, and more.

=== 2024 ===
The 2024 festival was held July 5–7, 2024. The lineup included Chaka Khan, Olivia Dean, Dionne Warwick and several other acts.

=== 2023 ===
2023 celebrated the 10-year anniversary of the festival. It was held June 20-July 2, 2023. Headliners included Little Simz and Grace Jones. Other acts included Thundercat (musician), Candi Staton (final UK shows), Marcus Miller, Gabriels, Shalamar, Pip Millett, Immanuel Wilkins, Mulatu Astatke and more.

=== 2022 ===
The 2022 festival was held July 1–3, 2022. Acts included Erykah Badu, Gregory Porter, TLC (group), and more.

=== 2021 ===
The 2021 edition of Love Supreme Jazz Festival took place between 2 and 4 July 2021. TLC, The Isley Brothers, Tom Misch & Yussef Dayes, Sister Sledge, Candi Staton, Nubya Garcia, Kokoroko, The Brand New Heavies, Cory Wong and MF Robots and more.

=== 2020 – Postponed ===
The festival was postponed in 2020 as a result of the COVID-19 pandemic. Before postponement the festival was due to host Anita Baker for her first UK show in 13 years as well as featuring performances from The Roots, TLC, The Isley Brothers and Tom Misch & Yussef Dayes amongst many others. All tickets were transferred to 2021 or customers could claim a refund.

=== 2019 ===
Love Supreme 2019 was opened on 5 July 2019 by performances from Sampa the Great and GoGo Penguin. Headlining the Main Stage on 6 July was Gladys Knight and the festival was closed on 7 July by Lauryn Hill. Also on the Main Stage were The Cinematic Orchestra, Jimmy Cliff, Mahalia, Jamie Cullum and Louie Vega & The Elements of Life. The Big Top hosted Chick Corea: Spanish Heart Band, Snarky Puppy, Kamaal Williams, Madeleine Peyroux and a special reinterpretation of Van Morrison's ‘Astral Weeks’ by Orphy Robinson. Steam Down and Makaya McCraven headlined the Arena stage on 6 and 7 July, with Theon Cross, Maisha and Joe Armon-Jones also playing across the weekend.

=== 2018 ===
Love Supreme 2018 saw Earth Wind and Fire and Elvis Costello headline the Main Stage on the Saturday and Sunday, with George Clinton & Parliament Funkadelic, Tom Misch, Level 42 and Mr Jukes also performing. The Big Top had Mavis Staples, Steve Winwood, Pharoah Sanders, Dave Holland, Chris Potter, Zakir Hussain and Tony Allen performing across the weekend. Nubya Garcia and Ezra Collective returned to the festival in the Arena stage, which was headlined by Portico Quartet and Moonchild.

=== 2017 ===
In 2017 the first ever completely sold out Love Supreme was held from 29 June to 2 July. The Main Stage headliners were The Jacksons on Saturday and Gregory Porter closing the festival on the Sunday as part of a line up that included Nao, Corinne Bailey Rae, George Benson, Kamasi Washington and St Paul & The Broken Bones. The Big Top saw Herbie Hancock and Robert Glasper Experiment headline with Laura Mvula, Christian Scott, Shabaka and the Ancestors, BadBadNotGood and Mica Paris across the weekend. The Arena line up included Sons of Kemet, Yussef Kamaal, Nubiyan Twist and Blue Lab Beats – headlined by The Comet Is Coming and Jordan Rakei.

=== 2016 ===
In 2016 the festival was opened as usual on the Friday by several new bands in the Arena, one of which was Ezra Collective. Grace Jones headlined the Main Stage on Saturday after performances by Lianne La Havas and Ibrahim Maalouf. Sunday's Main Stage program featured Kelis, Average White Band and Caro Emerald, headlined by Burt Bacharach. Esperanza Spalding, St Germain, Scofield Mehldau Guiliana, Melody Gardot and Kamasi Washington all played across the weekend in the Big Top. The Arena saw Mahalia, Swindle, Jacob Collier, Kandace Springs, Binker & Moses perform and Gilles Peterson close the tent on the Saturday night.

=== 2015 ===
The 2015 edition of Love Supreme was held between 3 and 5 July and saw vocalist Chaka Khan headline the Main Stage on the Saturday night. Rag N' Bone Man, a year from his first hit single, opened the main stage followed by Omar and Neneh Cherry. Van Morrison ended the festival for 2015 headlining the Main Stage on the Sunday night with Candi Staton and Lisa Stansfield preceding him. The Big Top stage saw jazz heroes Terence Blanchard, Jason Moran, Joshua Redman and Hugh Masekela play across the weekend. The Bandstand showcased groups Vels Trio and Nerija from the Tomorrow's Warriors program.

=== 2014 ===
The second Love Supreme Jazz Festival began on Friday 4 July. The Main Stage opened on Saturday with Natalie Williams’ Soul Family followed by performances from Snarky Puppy, Incognito, Laura Mvula and headliner Jamie Cullum. Elsewhere in the festival, the Big Top stage, sponsored by Ronnie Scott's Jazz Club, played host to acts such as John Scofield Überjam, Dave Holland’s Prism, Lalah Hathaway and Derrick Hodge. On Sunday 6 July the festival was headlined by De La Soul, with performances from Soul II Soul, Gregory Porter, Courtney Pine, Alice Russell, Christian McBride Trio and Polar Bear throughout the day.

=== 2013 ===
The first Love Supreme Jazz Festival was held during the weekend of 5–7 July. The festival site opened on the Friday with local bands playing followed by the return of club night Funky Sensation. On Saturday 6 July the Main Stage featured performances from Charles Bradley, Michael Kiwanuka, Chic featuring Nile Rodgers before headliner Bryan Ferry and The Bryan Ferry Orchestra. Elsewhere on site, Robert Glasper Experiment, Snarky Puppy, Marcus Miller, Courtney Pine, Zara MacFarlane, Portico Quartet and Kairos 4Tet all played. On Sunday, the event was headlined by Jools Holland and throughout the day there were performances by Brand New Heavies, Esperanza Spalding, Gregory Porter, Soweto Kinch, Melody Gardot, Roller Trio, Neil Cowley Trio and Terence Blanchard.

== Other activity ==
Love Supreme also hosted a 1-day music festival held in 2018 and 2019 at The Roundhouse in Camden, London. Love Supreme launched its sister platform Supreme Standards in October 2018 in order to promote more contemporary artists with new a website, podcast and live shows.

Love Supreme had planned to launch a Japanese edition of the festival in 2020 but this was cancelled due to the COVID-19 pandemic. The Japanese edition of the festival ran 2021–2023.
