= Thomas Trevor, 1st Baron Trevor =

British judge and politician (1658–1730)

The Right Honourable The Lord Trevor PC
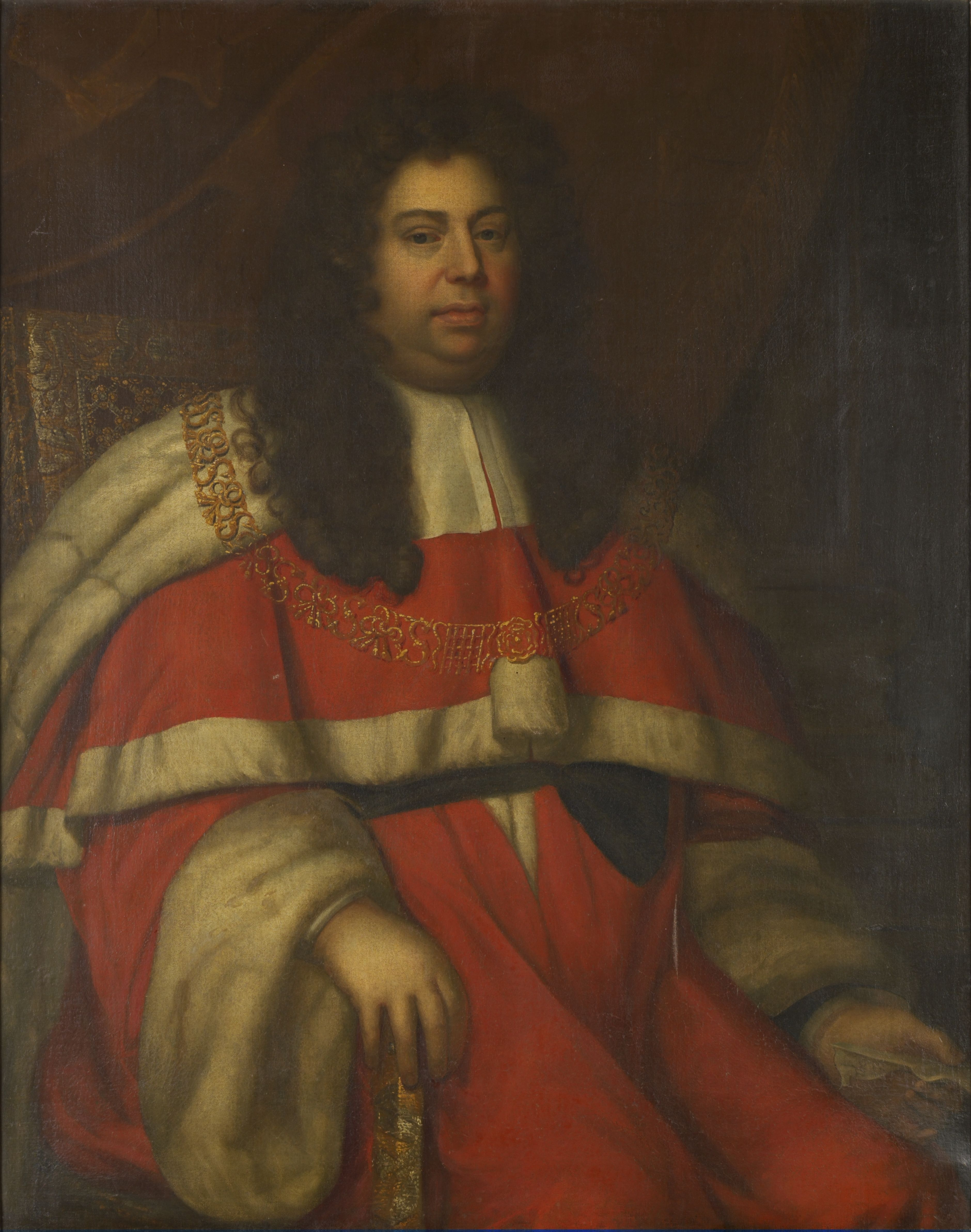
- Chief Justice Trevor

Lord President of the Council
- In office 8 May – 19 June 1730
- Monarch: George II
- Prime Minister: Sir Robert Walpole
- Preceded by: The Duke of Devonshire
- Succeeded by: The Earl of Wilmington

Arms of Trevor: Party per bend sinister ermine and ermines, a lion rampant or

Thomas Trevor, 1st Baron Trevor, PC (8 March 1658 – 19 June 1730) was an English and later British barrister, judge, and Tory politician who was Attorney-General and later Lord Privy Seal.

== Biography ==
Trevor was the second son of Sir John Trevor III. and was educated privately before entering the Inner Temple (1672) and Christ Church, Oxford. He was called to the bar in 1680.

He was made King's Counsel in 1683 and was knighted and made Solicitor General in 1692, being promoted to Attorney-General in 1695. In 1701 Trevor was appointed Chief Justice of the Common Pleas. He was also a Privy Councillor (1702–1714) and First Commissioner of the Great Seal (1710). In 1712 he was created a peer as Baron Trevor of Bromham. He was created as one of Harley's Dozen when twelve new peerages were distributed to shift the political balance in the Whig-dominated House of Lords towards the Tories in order to secure the Peace of Utrecht.

On the accession of George I in 1714 he was deprived of his offices for alleged Jacobite sympathies, but from 1726 he was restored to favour as Lord Privy Seal (1726 to his death), one of the Lords Justice Regents of the Realm (1727), Lord President of the Council (1730) and Governor of the Charterhouse.

In 1707 he was elected a fellow of the Royal Society.

== Family ==
In 1690 Trevor married Elizabeth (1672-1702), daughter of John Searle of Finchley, by whom he had 5 children:

- Thomas Trevor, 2nd Baron Trevor (1691-1753), who married Elizabeth (1697-1734), daughter of Timothy Burrell of Ockenden House, Cuckfield, a barrister, by her having one daughter, Elizabeth (1715-1761), who married Charles Spencer, 3rd Duke of Marlborough, thereby becoming the ancestress of the future Dukes of Marlborough and Winston Churchill
- Ann Trevor (1692-1785), who died unmarried
- Elizabeth Trevor (1693-1773), who died unmarried
- John Trevor (1695-1764), 3rd Baron Trevor, who married Elizabeth (c.1709-1782), daughter of Richard Steele, a writer, playwright, and politician, by her having one daughter Diana-Maria (1744-1778), who had severe learning difficulties and died unmarried
- Laetitia Trevor (1697-1769), who married Peter Cock of Camberwell, Surrey and had issue

In 1704 he married Anne Barnard, (c. 1670–1723), the daughter of Robert Weldon (or Wilding), a merchant in Fleet Street, London and Colonel of the Tower Hamlets Regiment. Anne had previously been married to Sir Robert Barnard of Brampton, 3rd Baronet, with whom she had had six children. By Anne, Trevor had two further children who lived to adulthood:

- Robert Trevor (1705-1783), 4th Baron Trevor (later created 1st Viscount Hampden)
- Richard Trevor (1707–1771), who was bishop of St Davids from 1744 to 1752, and then bishop of Durham.

== Notes ==
Parliament of England
Preceded by Sir George Treby; John Pollexfen	Member of Parliament for Plympton Erle; 1692–1698; With: John Pollexfen 1692–1695; Courtenay Croker 1695–1698	Succeeded by Martin Ryder; Courtenay Croker
Preceded by Henry Pelham; Thomas Pelham	Member of Parliament for Lewes; 1701; With: Thomas Pelham	Succeeded by Henry Pelham; Thomas Pelham
Legal offices
Preceded by Sir John Somers	Solicitor General; 1692–1695	Succeeded by Sir John Hawles
Preceded by Sir Edward Ward	Attorney General; 1695–1701	Succeeded by Sir Edward Northey
Preceded by Sir George Treby	Chief Justice of the Common Pleas; 1701–1714	Succeeded by Sir Peter King
Political offices
Preceded by The Duke of Kingston	Lord Privy Seal; 1726–1730	Succeeded by The Earl of Wilmington
Preceded by The Duke of Devonshire	Lord President of the Council; 1730	Succeeded by The Earl of Wilmington
Peerage of Great Britain
New creation	Baron Trevor; 2nd creation 1712–1730	Succeeded by Thomas Trevor
