= Glynde Place =

Country house in Glynde, England

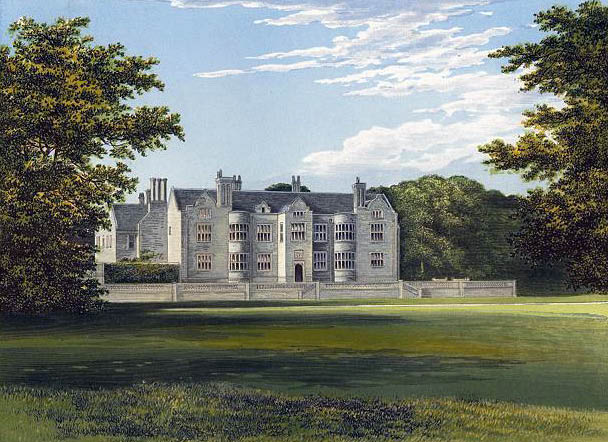
- Glynde Place from Morris's Country Seats (1880)

- Location within East Sussex
- 50°51′55″N 0°04′05″E
- Type: Country house
- Location: Glynde
- OS grid reference: TQ 45650 09356

History
- Built: 1569

Site notes
- Area: East Sussex
- Architectural style: Elizabethan
- Owner: Viscount Hampden

Listed Building – Grade I
- Official name: Glynde Place
- Designated: 17 March 1952
- Reference no.: 1221546

Glynde Place is an Elizabethan Manor House at Glynde in East Sussex, England. Situated in the South Downs National Park, it is the family home of the Viscounts Hampden, whose forebears built the house in 1569. It is a Grade I listed building. The adjacent church was built in the eighteenth century.

In 1883 the Brand family estate consisted of 8,846 acres (35.80 km^{2}) in Sussex (inherited through the families of Morley and Trevor, and valued at £8,121 a year), 6,658 in Hertfordshire, 3,600 in Essex, 2,081 in county Cambridge, and 978 in Suffolk. (Total 22,163 acres (89.69 km^{2}) worth £24,753 a year).

From 2008 - 2013, the house was subject to a major renovation, organised by the 7th Viscount Hampden, and funded by the sale of one of the estate's paintings.

The house and gardens, the latter being Grade II* listed, are open to the public for tours.

== Events ==
From 2010 to 2013, the Meadowlands Festival was held in the grounds. Since 2013, it is the site of the Love Supreme Jazz Festival, which takes place every summer.
