= Robert Hampden-Trevor, 1st Viscount Hampden =

British diplomat

Robert Hampden-Trevor
- Arms of Trevor: Party per bend sinister ermine and ermines, a lion rampant or

Postmaster General of the United Kingdom
- In office 1759-1765 Serving with The Earl of Bessborough (1759-1762); The Earl of Egmont (1762–1763); The Lord Hyde (1763–1765)

British Ambassador to the United Provinces
- In office 1739–1746

Personal details
- Born: 17 February 1706
- Died: 22 August 1783 (aged 77)
- Children: 2+, including John
- Parent(s): Thomas Trevor and Anne Trevor
- Education: The Queen's College, Oxford

Robert Hampden-Trevor, 1st Viscount Hampden (17 February 1706 – 22 August 1783) was a British diplomat at The Hague and then joint Postmaster General.

== Origins ==
He was the eldest son of the second marriage of his father Thomas Trevor, 1st Baron Trevor to Anne Bernard, née Weldon.

== Career ==
He studied at The Queen's College, Oxford, graduated in 1725 and then became a fellow of All Souls College, Oxford. In 1729 he was appointed as a clerk in the Secretary of State's office. In 1734 he went to the United Provinces as secretary to the embassy under Horatio Walpole. He succeeded as head of the embassy in 1739, initially as Envoy-Extraordinary, and from 1741 as Minister-Plenipotentiary. During this time he maintained a regular correspondence with Horace Walpole.

In 1750 he was appointed a Commissioner of the Revenue in Ireland. He took the additional surname of Hampden in 1754, on succeeding to the estates of his relative John Hampden. Twelve years after he had succeeded his brother as Baron Trevor, he was created, on 14 June 1776, Viscount Hampden, of Great and Little Hampden in the County of Buckingham.

From 1759 to 1765 he was joint Postmaster General. He wrote some Latin poems which were published at Parma in 1792 as Poemata Hampdeniana.

== Marriages ==
He first had an unacknowledged Fleet marriage and had two sons, one of whom, the Rev. Dr John Trevor, (1740-1796) was appointed Rector of Otterhampton in 1771, but who later moved to the Continent and eventually became Minister of the Protestant chapel at Ostend, where he died in 1796. He had five daughters by his first wife, one of whom was the seafarer Frances Barkley.

Trevor married secondly, on 6 Feb. 1743, at The Hague, Constantia, daughter of Peter Anthony de Huybert, lord of Van Kruyningen, by whom he left four children—Maria Constantia (who married Henry Howard, 12th Earl of Suffolk), Thomas, second viscount Hampden, John Hampden-Trevor, third viscount Hampden [q. v.], and Anne.

His second son, John Hampden-Trevor, 3rd Viscount Hampden (1749–1824), died only three weeks after he had succeeded his elder brother Thomas Hampden-Trevor, 2nd Viscount Hampden, when the titles became extinct.

Diplomatic posts
Preceded by Horatio Walpole	British Ambassador to the United Provinces; 1739–1746	Succeeded by The Earl of Sandwich
Government offices
Preceded by The Earl of Leicester; Everard Fawkener	Postmaster General of the United Kingdom; 1759–1765 with The Earl of Bessborough (1759–1762); The Earl of Egmont (1762–1763); The Lord Hyde (1763–1765)	Succeeded by The Lord Grantham; The Earl of Bessborough
Peerage of Great Britain
New creation	Viscount Hampden; 1st creation 1776–1783	Succeeded by Thomas Hampden-Trevor
Preceded by John Trevor	Baron Trevor; 2nd creation 1764–1783	Succeeded by Thomas Hampden-Trevor
