= Colorado Street Bridge =

Colorado Street Bridge may refer to:

- Colorado Street Bridge (Pasadena, California)
- Colorado Street Bridge (Saint Paul, Minnesota)
