= Skew arch =

Method of construction

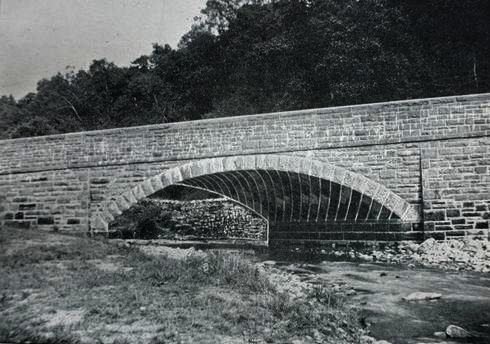
A masonry skew arch bridge photographed shortly after its completion in 1898, showing the helicoidal nature of its stonework. Sickergill Skew Bridge over the River Raven at Renwick, near Penrith.

A skew arch (also known as an oblique arch) is a method of construction that enables an arch bridge to span an obstacle at some angle other than a right angle. This results in the faces of the arch not being perpendicular to its abutments and its plan view being a parallelogram, rather than the rectangle that is the plan view of a regular, or "square" arch.

In the case of a masonry skew arch, the construction requires precise stonecutting, as the cuts do not form right angles, but once the principles were fully understood in the early 19th century, it became considerably easier and cheaper to build a skew arch of brick.

The problem of building skew arch masonry bridges was addressed by a number of early civil engineers and mathematicians, including Giovanni Barbara (1726), William Chapman (1787), Benjamin Outram (1798), Peter Nicholson (1828), George Stephenson (1830), Edward Sang (1835), Charles Fox (1836), George W. Buck (1839) and William Froude (c. 1844).

== History ==
=== Benjamin Outram and Store Street Aqueduct ===
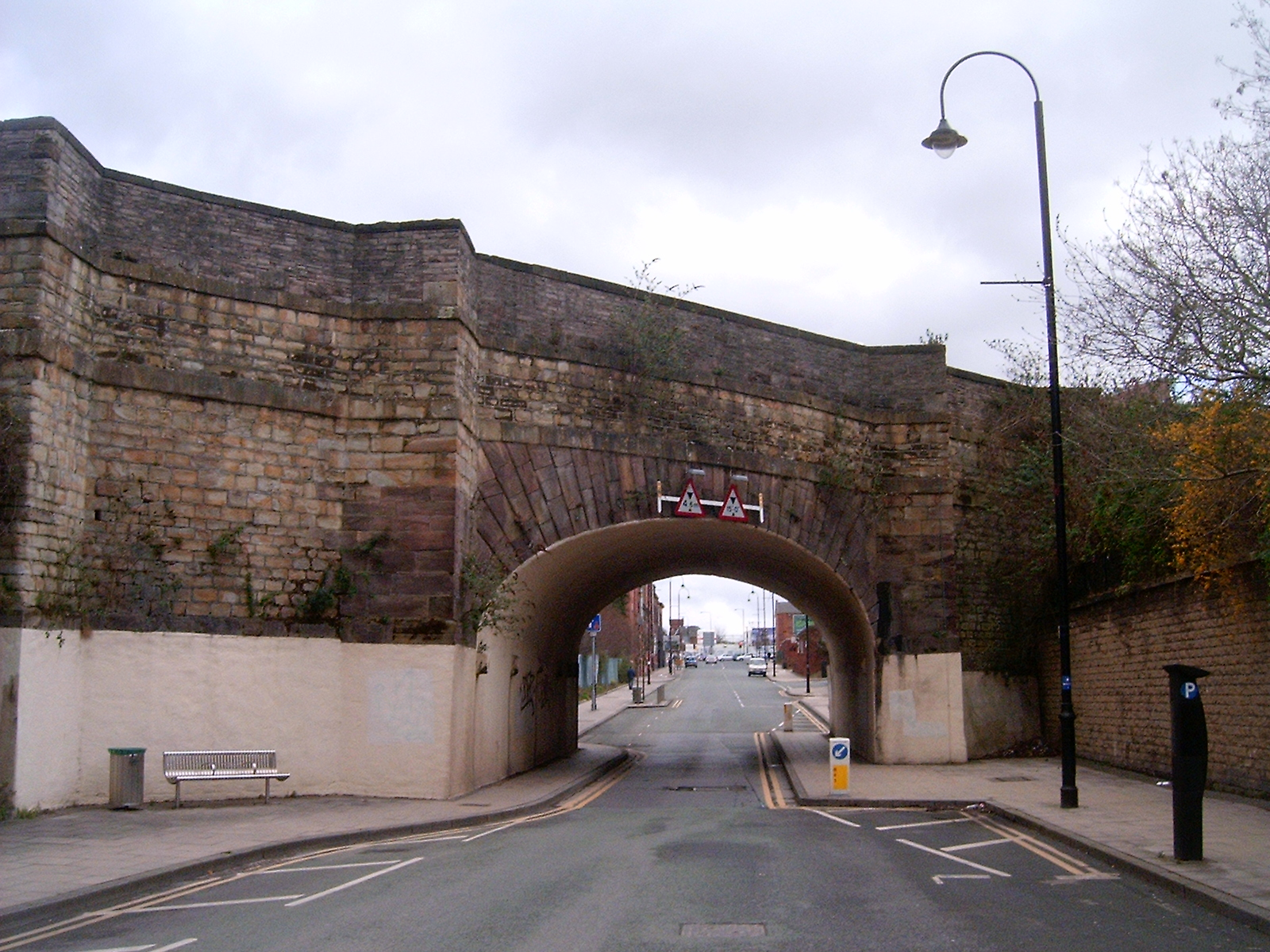
Store Street Aqueduct from Store Street

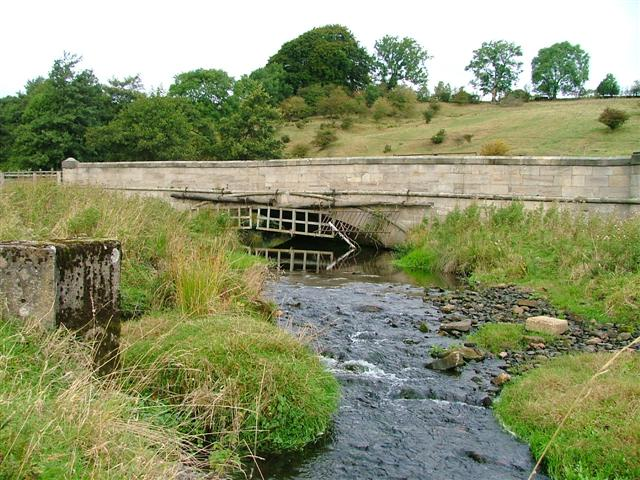
Swin Bridge over the River Gaunless

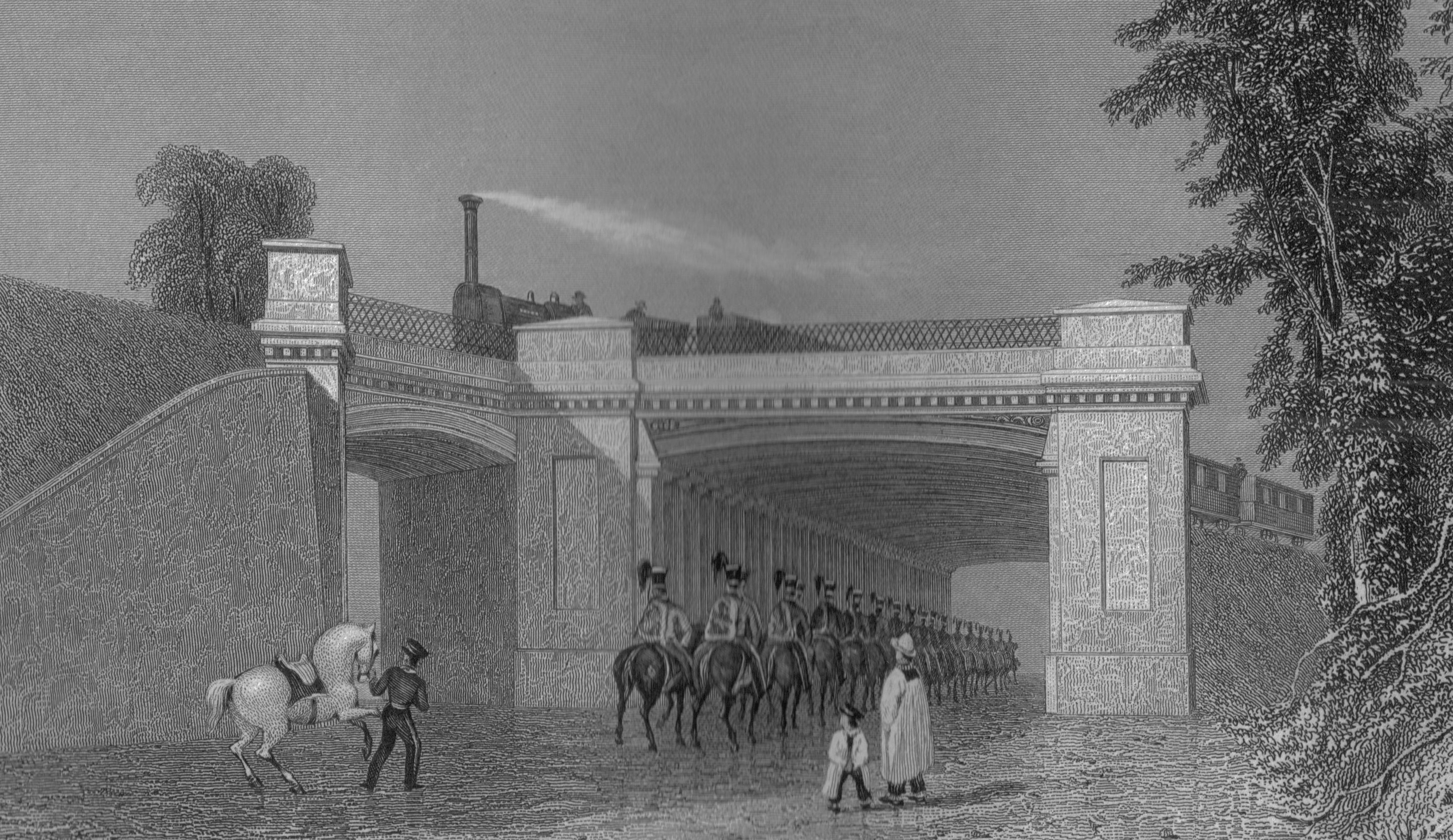
A contemporary engraving of Denbigh Hall railway bridge

Skew bridges are not a recent invention, having been built on exceptional occasions since Roman times, but they were little understood and rarely used before the advent of the railway. An early example of the skew arch is the Arco Barbara in the Floriana Lines fortifications in Malta, which was designed by the Maltese architect and military engineer Giovanni Barbara in 1726. Another notable exception is an aqueduct, designed by British engineer Benjamin Outram, constructed in masonry and completed in 1798, which still carries the Ashton Canal at an angle of 45° over Store Street in Manchester. Outram's design is believed to be based on work done on the Kildare Canal in Ireland in 1787, in which William Chapman introduced the segmental oblique arch to the design of Finlay Bridge at Naas, employing an arch barrel based on a circular segment that is smaller than a semicircle and which was repeated by Thomas Storey in 1830 in the bridge carrying the Haggerleases branch of the Stockton and Darlington Railway over the River Gaunless near Cockfield, County Durham with a skew angle of 63° and a skew span of 42 feet (13 m), resulting in a clear span of 18 feet (5.5 m) and a rise of 7 feet (2.1 m). The common method they all used was to clad the timber centring (also known as falsework) with planks, known as "laggings", laid parallel with the abutments and carefully planed and levelled to approximate closely the required curve of the intrados of the arch. The positions of the courses in the vicinity of the crown were first marked out at right angles to the faces using long wooden straight-edges, then the remaining courses were marked out in parallel. The masons then laid the stones, cutting them to shape as required.

Contemporary designs by rival engineers were less successful and for a time skew bridges were considered weak in comparison with the regular, or "square" arch bridge and so were avoided if at all possible, the alternatives being to construct the road or canal with a double bend, so as to allow it to cross the obstacle at right angles, or to build a regular arch bridge with the extra width or span necessary to clear the obstacle "on the square". An example of the latter type of construction is Denbigh Hall Bridge, built in 1837 to carry the London and Birmingham Railway across Watling Street at an acute angle of only 25°. Now a Grade II listed structure, the bridge is still in use today, carrying the busy West Coast Main Line. It was constructed in the form of a long gallery, some 200 feet (61 m) long and 34 feet (10 m) wide, consisting of iron girders resting on walls built parallel with the road; the girders, and consequently the faces of the bridge, being perpendicular to the roadway and the railway line being laid out obliquely across the top, the need to build a highly skewed bridge of 80 feet (24 m) span was therefore avoided.

The eminent canal engineer James Brindley never succeeding in working out a solution to the problem of constructing a strong skew arch and as a consequence all his overbridges were built at right angles to the waterway, with double bends in the roadway, where necessary, and to this day many of them cause inconvenience to their users. However, it was the coming of the railway, with its need to cross existing obstacles, such as rivers, roads, canals and other railways, in as straight a line as possible, that rekindled the civil engineer's interest in the skew arch bridge.

=== The false skew arch ===
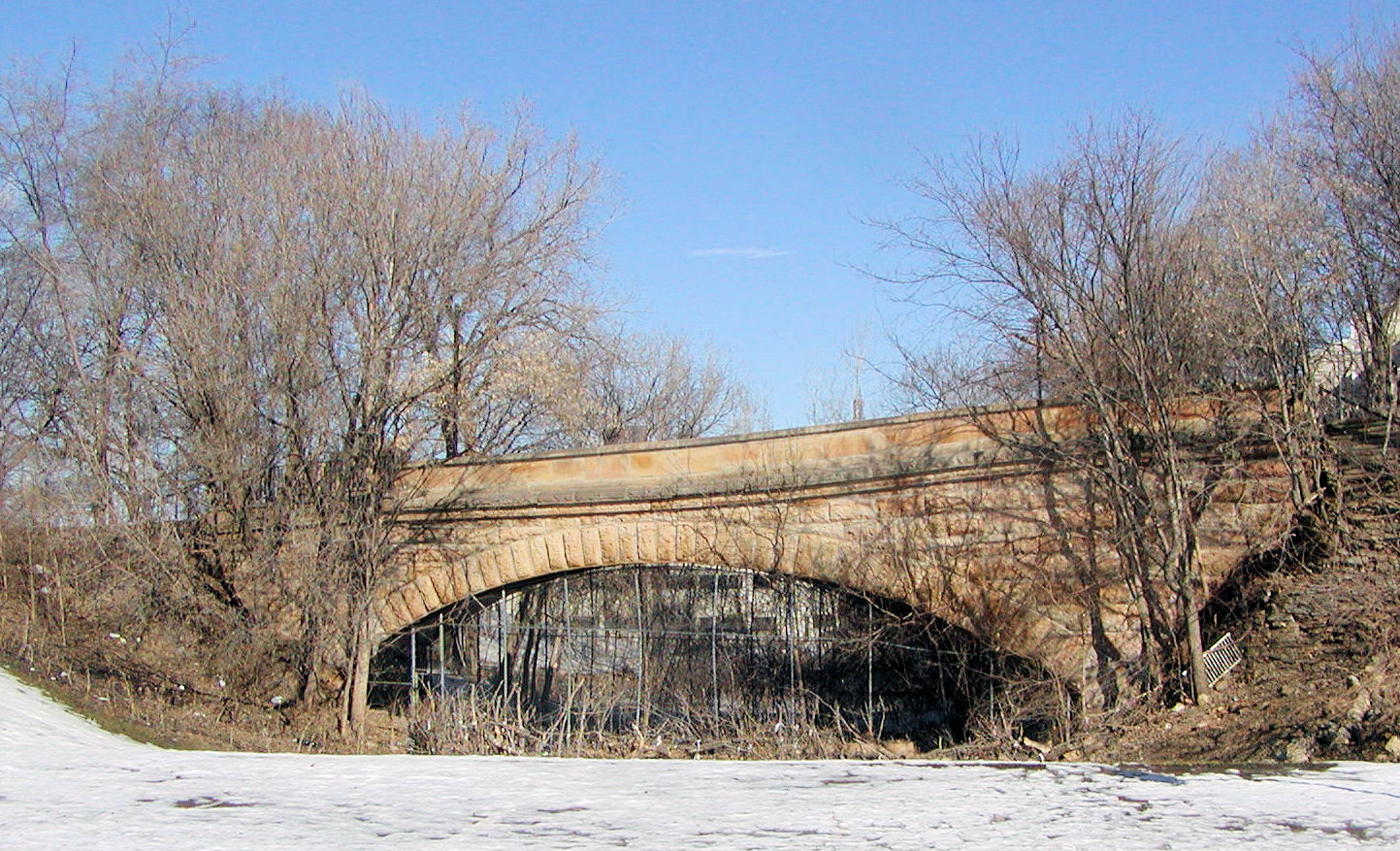
Colorado Street Bridge, an example of a false skew arch

The strength of a regular arch (also known as a "square" or "right" arch) comes from the fact that the mass of the structure and its superincumbent load cause lines of force that are carried by the stones into the ground and the abutments without producing any tendency for the stones to slide with respect to one another. This is due to the fact that the courses of stone are laid parallel to the abutments, which in a regular arch causes them also to lie perpendicular to its faces. For only slightly oblique bridges, where the skew angle is less than approximately 15° it is possible to use the same construction method, laying the stones in courses parallel to the abutments. The result is known as a "false" skew arch and analysis of the forces within it shows that in each corner where the face forms an acute angle with an abutment there are resultant forces that are not perpendicular to the planes of the stone courses whose tendency is to push the stones out of the face, the only resistance to this being provided by friction and the adhesion of the mortar between the stones. An example of such a false skew arch is the Colorado Street Bridge in Saint Paul, Minnesota. Before starting work on Store Street Aqueduct, Outram built a number of false skew arches, one of them with a skew angle as great as 19°, as accommodation bridges across the Huddersfield Narrow Canal. The fact that these inherently weak structures are still standing today is attributed to their light loading.

=== A more rigorous approach ===
When considering the balance of forces within a regular arch, in which all courses of masonry that make up the barrel are parallel with its abutments and perpendicular to its faces, it is convenient to consider it as a two-dimensional object by taking a vertical section through the body of the arch and parallel with its faces, thereby ignoring any variation in loading along the length of its barrel. In an oblique or skew arch the axis of the barrel is deliberately not perpendicular to the faces, the deviation from perpendicularity being known as the skew angle or the "obliquity" of the arch. For this reason a skew arch needs to be thought of as a three-dimensional object and by considering the direction of the lines of force within the barrel the optimum orientation for the courses of stonework that make the barrel can be decided.

=== The helicoidal skew arch ===
A characteristic of the regular arch is that the courses of stones run parallel to the abutments and perpendicular to the faces. In an oblique arch these two conditions cannot both be met because the faces and the abutments are deliberately not perpendicular. Since skew angles greater than about 15° are required for many applications, mathematicians and engineers such as Chapman abandoned the idea of laying the courses of stones parallel to the abutments and considered the alternative of laying the courses perpendicular to the faces of the arch, and accepting the fact that they would then no longer run parallel to the abutments. Though Outram's Store Street Aqueduct was constructed with this principle in mind, it was done so empirically, with the masons cutting each voussoir stone as it was required, and it was not until 1828 that details of the technique were published in a form that was useful to other engineers and stonemasons.

==== Peter Nicholson's helicoidal method in stone ====
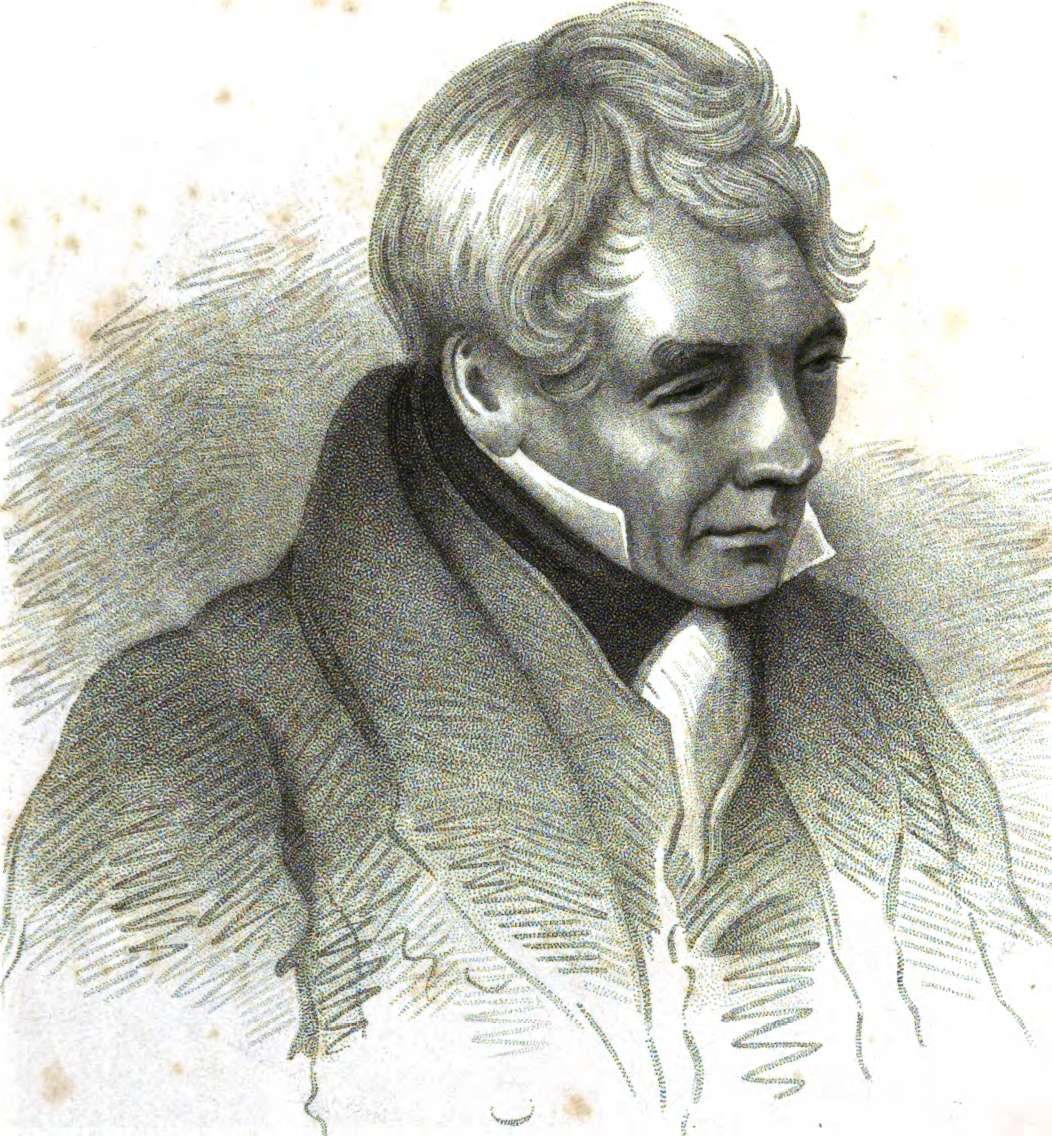
Peter Nicholson (1765–1844)

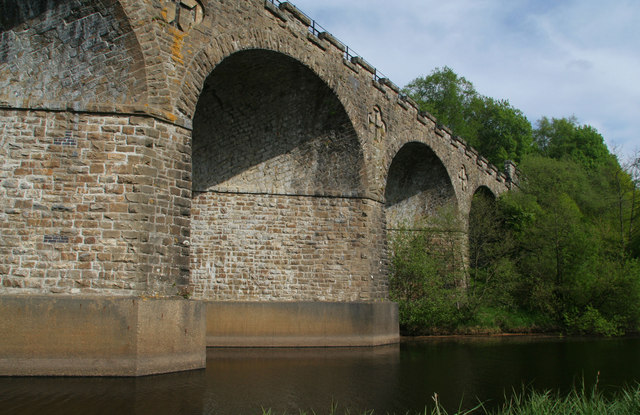
Kielder Viaduct, built to Nicholson's pattern

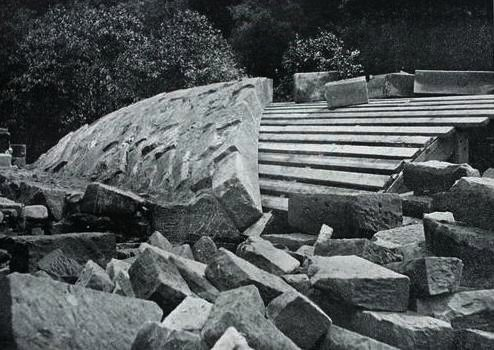
A helicoidal skew arch under construction, showing the placing of the voussoirs on the laggings of the centring

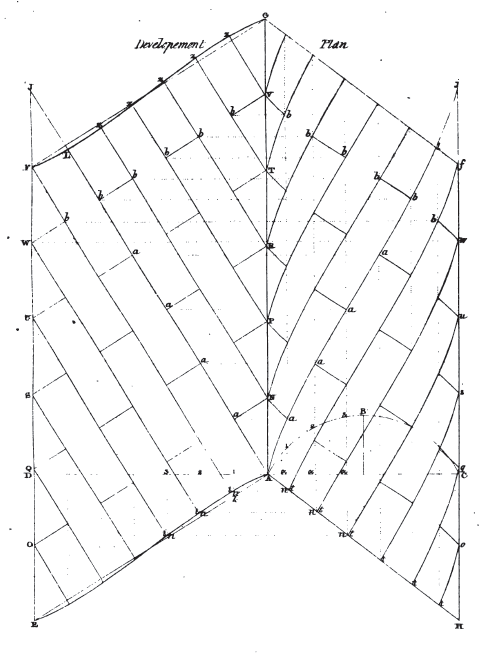
A plate from Nicholson's Guide to Railway Masonry showing the development (left) and the plan view of the intrados of a helicoidal skew arch

In his book A Popular and Practical Treatise on Masonry and Stone-cutting (1828), Scottish architect, mathematician, cabinet-maker and engineer Peter Nicholson first set out in clear and understandable terms a workable method for determining the shape and position of the stones required for the construction of a strong skew arch that enabled them to be prepared in advance of the actual construction process.

Nicholson approached the problem by constructing a development of the intrados of the arch from the plan and elevation drawings, effectively unrolling and flattening the surface, then drawing the courses perpendicular to the faces, adding the header joints perpendicular to the courses, then finally rolling up the development diagram by projecting the detail of the intrados back onto the plan and elevation drawings, a technique also used by others who would later offer alternative solutions to the problem. This method resulted in the courses of stone voussoirs making up the barrel of the skew arch following parallel helical paths between the abutments, giving the view along the barrel an attractive rifled appearance. Although these courses meet the arch faces at right angles at the crown of the arch, the nearer they are to the springing line the greater their deviation from perpendicularity. Thus Nicholson's method is not the perfect solution, but it is a workable one that has one great advantage over more purist alternatives, namely that since the helical courses run parallel to each other, all the voussoir stones can be cut to the same pattern, the only exceptions being the ring stones, or quoins, where the barrel meets the faces of the arch, each of which is unique but has an identical copy in the other face.

Nicholson never pretended to have invented the skew arch but in his later work The Guide to Railway Masonry, containing a Complete Treatise on the Oblique Arch (1839), he does claim to have invented the method for producing the templates that enabled the accurate cutting of the voussoir stones used in all skew bridges built between the years 1828 and 1836, citing testimonials from the builders of major works, such as the Croft Viaduct at Croft-on-Tees near Darlington. However, by 1836 a young engineer called Charles Fox had improved on Nicholson's helicoidal method and other writers were proposing alternative approaches to the problem.

==== Charles Fox's English method in brick ====
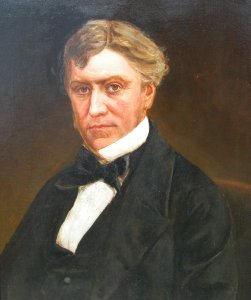
Charles Fox (1810–1874)

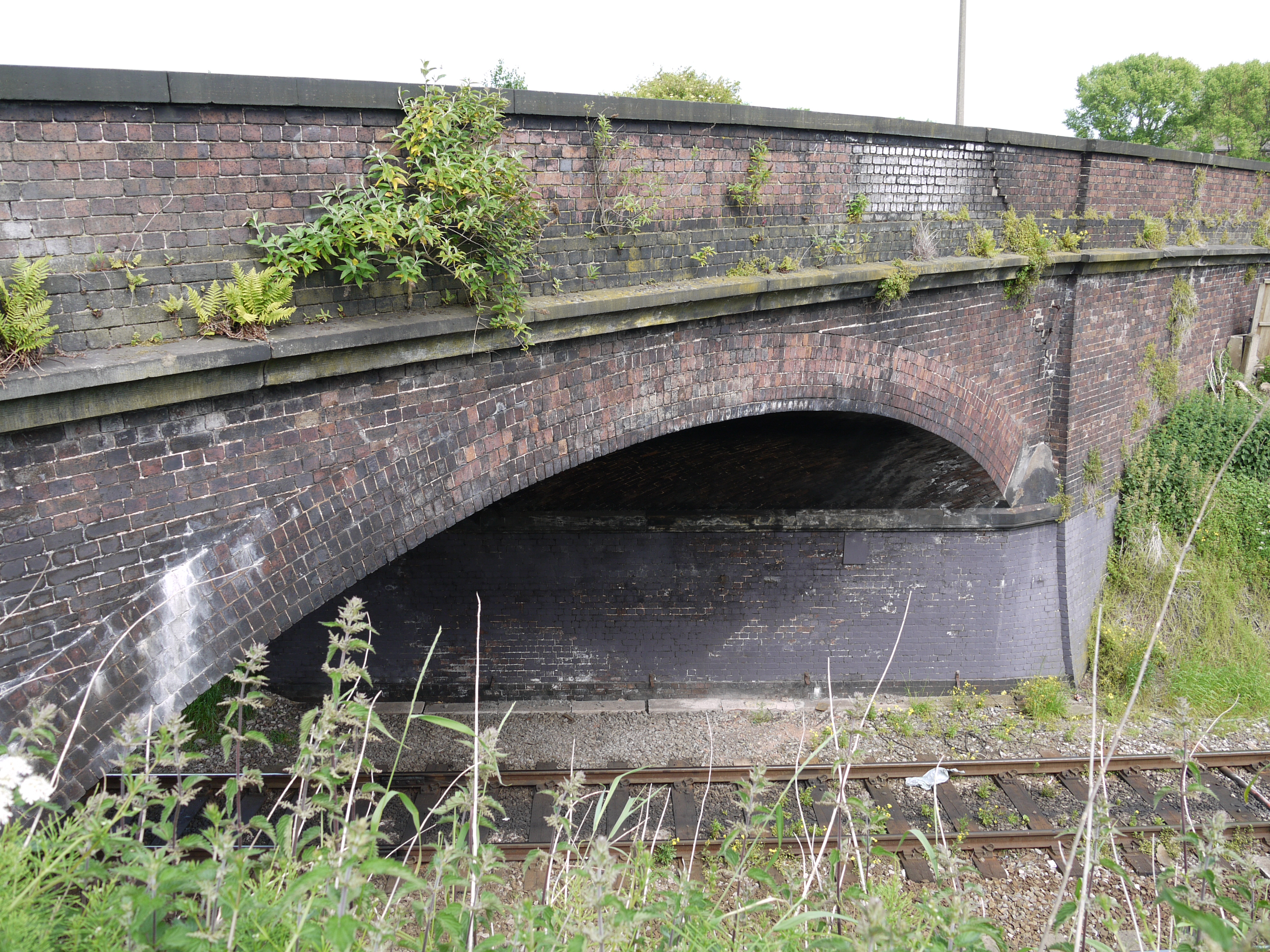
A brick segmental arch skew bridge with six rings and brick quoins

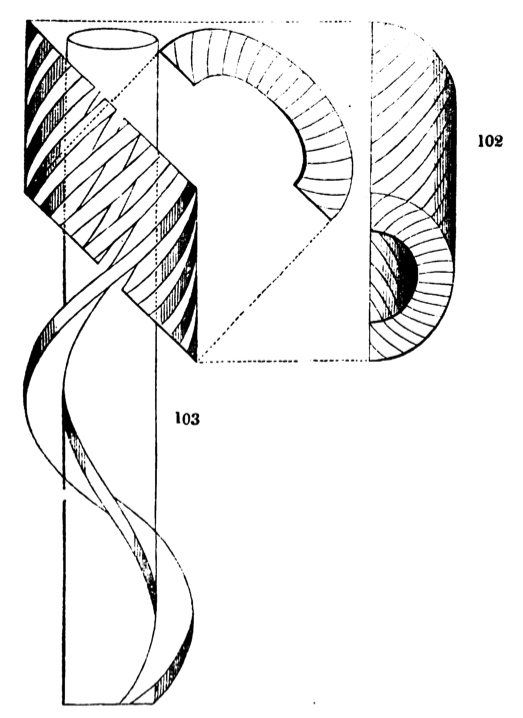
A plate from Fox's paper showing skew courses as sections of a square threaded screw

In performing his calculations Nicholson considered the arch barrel to be made from one ring of stones and of negligible thickness and therefore he developed only the intrados. The idea was expanded in Charles Fox's 1836 publication On the Construction of Skew Arches, in which he considered the intrados of the barrel and the extrados as separate surfaces mapped onto concentric cylinders by drawing a separate development for each. This approach had two advantages. Firstly, he was able to develop a theoretical third, intermediate surface midway between the intrados and the extrados, which allowed him to align the centre of each voussoir, rather than its inner surface, along the desired line, thereby better approximating the ideal placement than Nicholson was able to achieve. Secondly, it enabled him to develop an arbitrary number of concentric intermediate surfaces so as to plan the courses in multi-ring skew arch barrels, allowing them for the first time to be constructed in brick, and therefore much more economically than was previously possible.

In order to explain how he visualised the courses of voussoirs in a stone skew arch, Fox wrote, "The principle which I have adopted is, to work the stones in the form of a spiral quadrilateral solid, wrapped round a cylinder, or, in plainer language, the principle of a square threaded screw: hence it becomes quite evident, that the transverse sections of all these spiral stones are the same throughout the whole arch. It will be obvious, that the beds of the stones should be worked into true spiral [helicoidal] planes." So, a stone skew arch built to Fox's plan would have its voussoirs cut with a slight twist, in order to follow the shape of a square threaded screw.

While claiming a superior method, Fox openly acknowledged Nicholson's contribution but in 1837 he felt the need to reply to a published letter written in support of Nicholson by fellow engineer Henry Welch, the County Bridge Surveyor for Northumberland. Unfortunately the three men became involved in a paper war that, following a number of earlier altercations in which the originality of his writings was questioned, left the 71-year-old Nicholson feeling bitter and unappreciated. The following year Fox, still aged only 28 and employed by Robert Stephenson as an engineer on the London and Birmingham Railway, presented his paper encapsulating these principles to the Royal Institution and from this was born the English or helicoidal method of constructing brick skew arches. Using this method many thousands of skew bridges were built either entirely of brick or of brick with stone quoins by railway companies in the United Kingdom, a substantial number of which survive and are still in use today.

==== George W. Buck and William H. Barlow ====
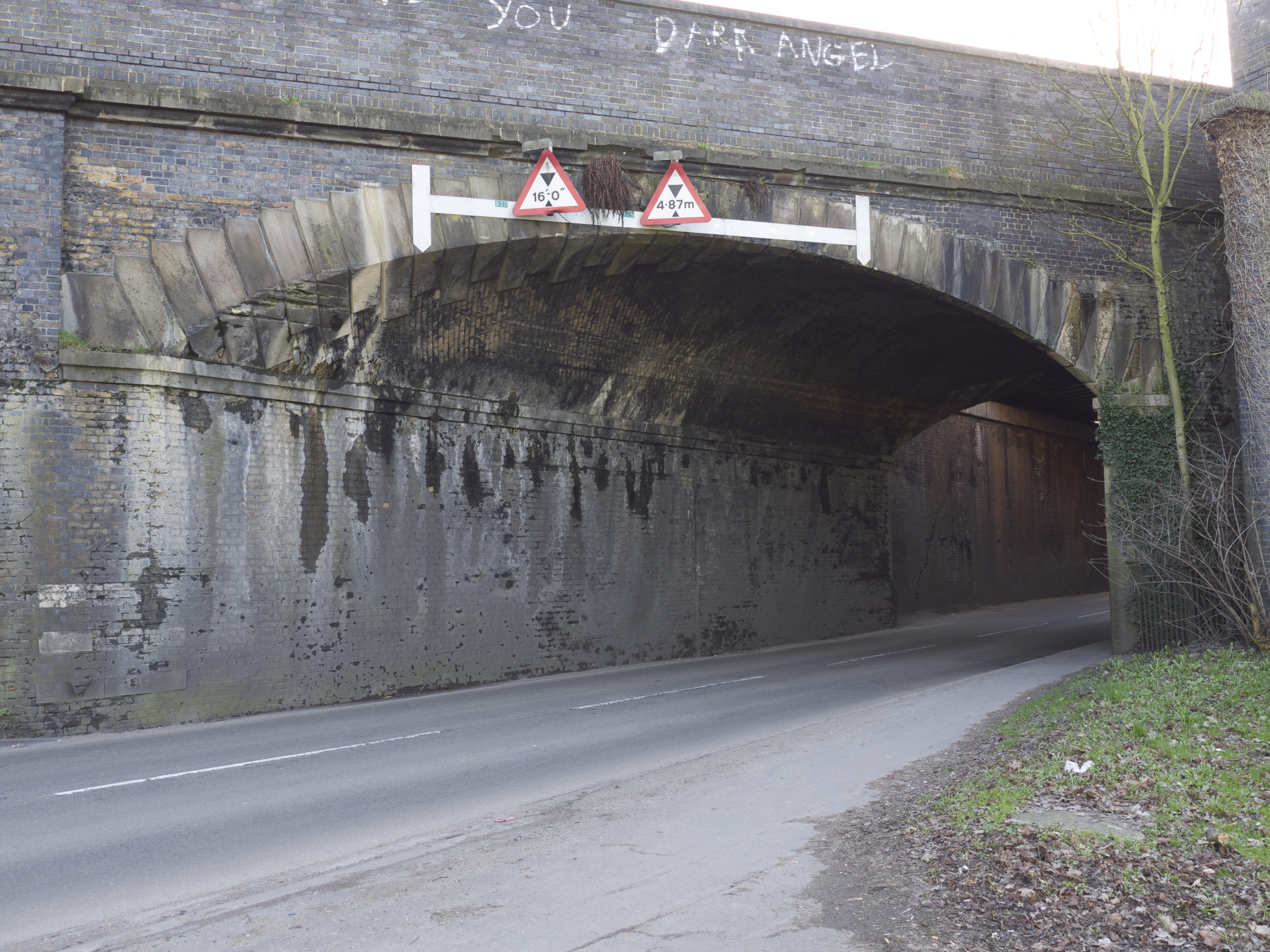
Boxmoor Skew Bridge in 2011, looking in a SSW direction from London Road

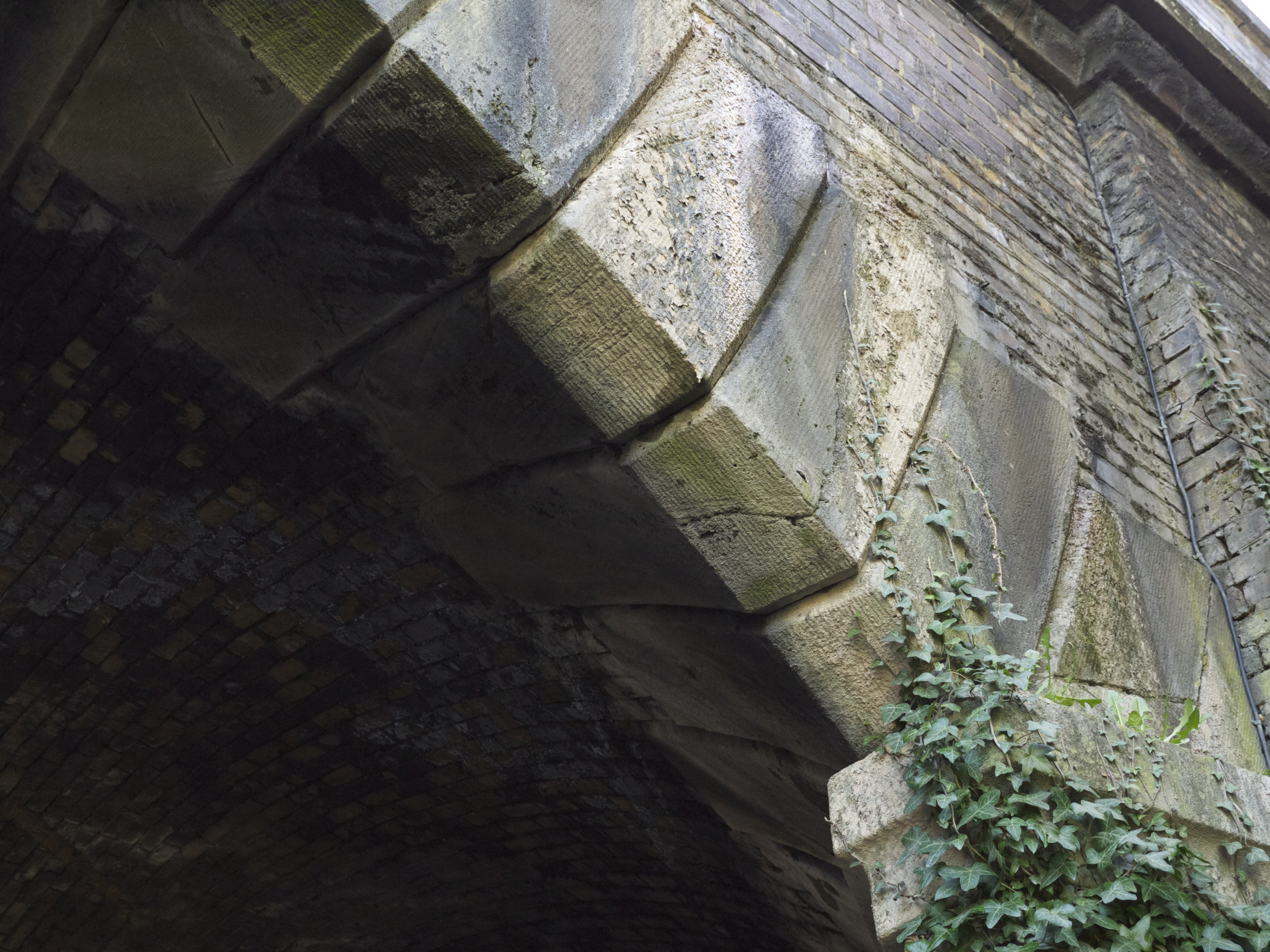
Boxmoor Skew Bridge detail, showing the chamfered acute quoins and stepped extrados

In 1839, George Watson Buck, having also worked on the London and Birmingham Railway under Stephenson before moving to the Manchester and Birmingham Railway, published a work entitled A Practical and Theoretical Essay on Oblique Bridges in which he also acknowledged Nicholson's contribution but, finding it lacking in detail, applied his own original trigonometrical approach and considerable practical experience to the problem. This book was acknowledged as the definitive work on the subject of the helicoidal skew arch and remained a standard text book for railway engineers until the end of the 19th century. Buck's trigonometrical approach allowed every dimension of a skew arch to be calculated without recourse to taking measurements from scale drawings and it allowed him to calculate the theoretical minimum angle of obliquity to which a practical semicircular helicoidal skew bridge could be designed and safely built. The "Buck Limit", as it is known, has a value of 25°40′ or, when quoted in terms of the maximum angle of skew, a value of 64°20′.

Buck paid particular attention to the design of bridges of extreme obliquity, addressing two potential problems he had identified. Firstly, he noted that the acutely angled quoins at the obtuse corners of the plan view were very susceptible to damage during construction, settlement or by accidental blows in subsequent use so he devised a method of chamfering the edge, removing the single acute angle and replacing it with two obtuse angles and, in his own words, "the quantity thus cut off from the acute quoin, is gradually diminished to the opposite or obtuse quoin, where the cutting vanishes; by this contrivance no angle less than a right angle is any where presented on the exterior of the work [...] the effect produced is elegant and pleasing to the eye." Secondly, he recommended that the extrados of the barrel of an arch of great obliquity be formed into rusticated steps so as to provide a horizontal bed for the spandrel walls in order to overcome their tendency to slide off the arch barrel. The bridge carrying the London and Birmingham Railway over the London Road at Boxmoor in Hertfordshire, adjacent to what is now Hemel Hempstead station on the West Coast Main Line, is an example of a segmental arch of extreme obliquity that was designed by Buck and incorporates both of these features. Constructed in masonry, with a brick barrel, stone quoins and a 58° angle of skew, it was completed in 1837. Shortly before the railway opened the bridge was the subject of an ink and wash drawing dated 12 June 1837, one of a series of works by artist John Cooke Bourne illustrating the construction of the line.

Buck's Essay, containing its criticism of Nicholson's work, was published in July 1839, just a few months before Nicholson's Guide to Railway Masonry, causing the ongoing paper war in The Civil Engineer and Architect's Journal to continue acrimoniously as Nicholson accused Buck of stealing his ideas and Buck issued a counter-claim. In 1840, Buck's assistant, the young engineer William Henry Barlow, entered the fray, initially signing himself cryptically W.H.B., but eventually declaring publicly his strong support for Buck. Nicholson, by this time aged 75 and his health failing, had been struggling financially since the bankruptcy of one of his publishers in 1827 and he was in desperate need of the revenue he hoped to receive from sales of his Guide. While both Fox and Buck had been happy to acknowledge Nicholson's work and had fought a mostly intellectual battle, Barlow's attacks became less gentlemanly and more personal causing Nicholson, who later received anonymous public support from the mysterious M.Q., considerable distress.

=== Alternatives to the helicoidal method ===
The helicoidal method of laying down the stone or brick courses championed by Nicholson, Fox and Buck is only an approximation to the ideal. Since the courses are only square to the faces of the arch at the crown and deviate more from perpendicularity the closer they are to the springing line, thereby over-correcting the deficiencies of the false skew arch and weakening the obtuse angle, the mathematical purists recommend that helicoidal construction be restricted to segmental arches and not be used in full-centred (semicircular) designs. Despite this there were many full-centred skew bridges built to the helicoidal pattern and many still stand, Kielder Viaduct and Neidpath Viaduct being just two examples.

==== Edward Sang's logarithmic method ====
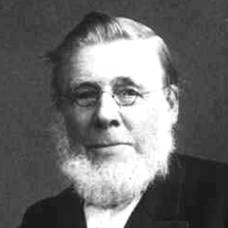
Edward Sang (1805–1890)

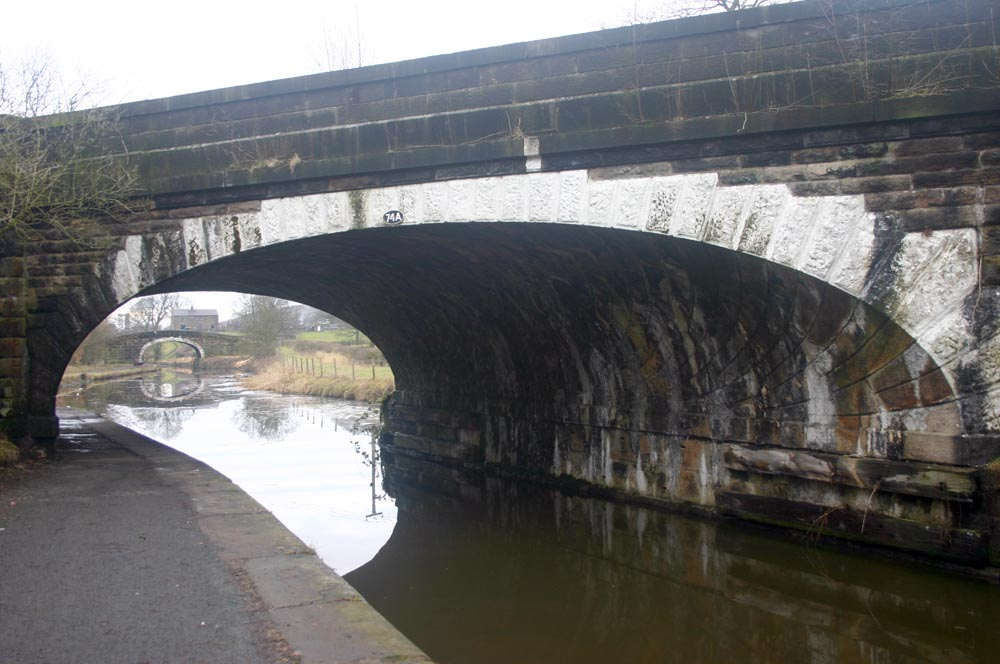
Bridge number 74A carrying the Bolton and Preston Railway over the Leeds and Liverpool Canal

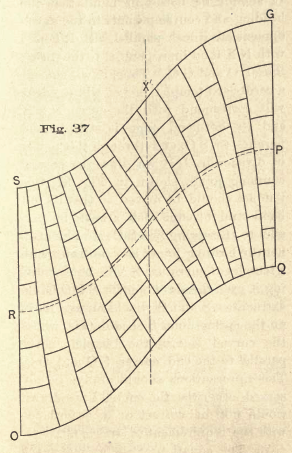
The development of the intrados of a skew arch built to the logarithmic pattern

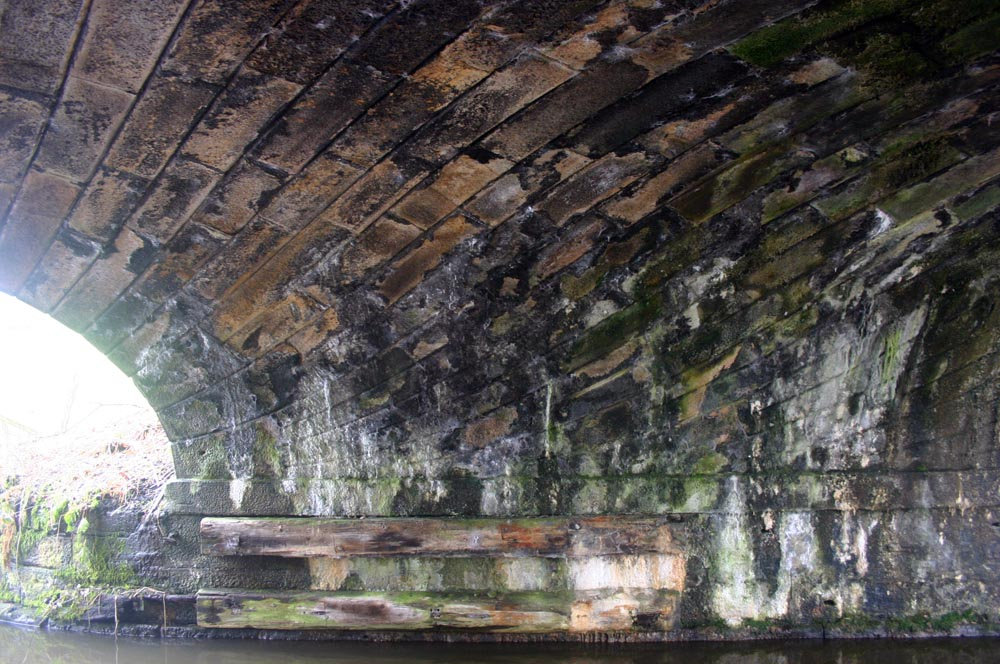
Detailed view of the intrados of bridge 74A

The search for a technically pure orthogonal method of constructing a skew arch led to the proposal of the logarithmic method by Edward Sang, a mathematician living in Edinburgh, in his presentation in three parts to the Society for the Encouragement of the Useful Arts between 18 November 1835 and 27 January 1836, during which time he was elected vice-president of the Society, though his work was not published until 1840. The logarithmic method is based on the principle of laying the voussoirs in "equilibrated" courses in which they follow lines that run truly perpendicular to the arch faces at all elevations, while the header joints between the stones within each course are truly parallel with the arch face.

While a helix is produced by projecting a straight line onto the surface of a cylinder, Sang's method requires that a series of logarithmic curves be projected onto a cylindrical surface, hence its name. In terms of strength and stability, a skew bridge built to the logarithmic pattern has advantages over one built to the helicoidal pattern, especially so in the case of full-centred designs. However, the courses are not parallel, being thinner towards the most acutely angled quoin (located where the face of the arch makes an obtuse angle with the abutment in the plan view, at S and Q in the development to the left, and at the left hand side of the photograph of the intrados on the right) and thicker towards the most obtusely angled quoin (at O and G in the development and just off the right hand side of the photograph), requiring specially cut stones, no two of which in a given course being the same, which precludes the use of mass-produced bricks. Nevertheless, two courses beginning at opposite ends of the barrel at the same height above the springing line are exactly alike, halving the number of templates required.

In 1838, Alexander James Adie, son of the famous optical instrument manufacturer of the same name, as resident engineer on the Bolton and Preston Railway was the first to put the theory into practice, building several skew bridges to the logarithmic pattern on that route, including the semi-elliptical Grade II listed bridge number 74A that carries the line over the Leeds and Liverpool Canal, which was formerly known as the southern section of the Lancaster Canal with the intention of connecting it to the northern section, though this was never achieved as the necessary aqueduct over the River Ribble proved too expensive to build. He presented a paper on the subject to the Institution of Civil Engineers the following year and in 1841, academic William Whewell of Trinity College, Cambridge published his book The Mechanics of Engineering in which he expounded the virtues of building skew bridges with equilibrated courses, but due to the poor complexity to benefit ratio, there have been few other adopters.

==== The French corne de vache method ====
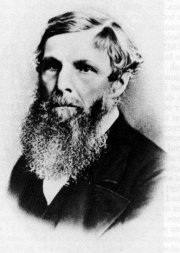
William Froude (1810–1879)

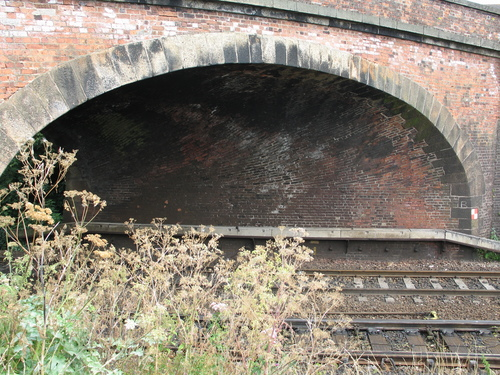
Skew arch at Cowley Bridge Junction in Devon, showing the complex brickwork

The corne de vache or "cow's horn" method is another way of laying courses such that they meet the face of the arch orthogonally at all elevations. Unlike the helicoidal and logarithmic methods, in which the intrados of the arch barrel is cylindrical, the corne de vache method results in a warped hyperbolic paraboloid surface that dips in the middle, rather like a saddle. Despite being known as the French method of skew arch building, it was actually introduced by English engineer William Froude whilst working under Isambard Kingdom Brunel on the Bristol and Exeter Railway, which opened in 1844. Although no details of Froude's work in this area survive and despite being better remembered for his work on hydrodynamics, he is known to have built at least two overbridges in red brick with stone quoins using this principle on the line just north of Exeter, at Cowley Bridge Junction where the A377 Exeter–Barnstaple road crosses at an oblique angle and, about 4 miles (6.4 km) to the northeast, at Rewe, on the A396, both of which survive and are in daily use. The brickwork is considerably more complex than in a helicoidal design and, in order to ensure that the courses of bricks meet the faces of the arch at right angles, many had to be cut to produce tapers. The corne de vache approach tends to result in a structure that is almost as strong as one built to the logarithmic pattern and considerably stronger than one built to the helicoidal pattern but, again, the extra complexity has meant that the method has not seen widespread adoption, especially since the simpler helicoidal structure can be built much stronger if a segmental design is chosen, rather than a full-centred one.

==== The ribbed skew arch ====
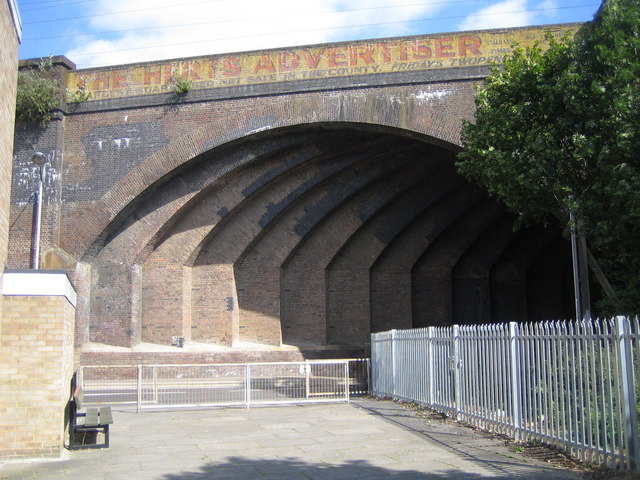
Southdown Road Skew Bridge in Harpenden, Hertfordshire, an example of a ribbed skew arch made of brick

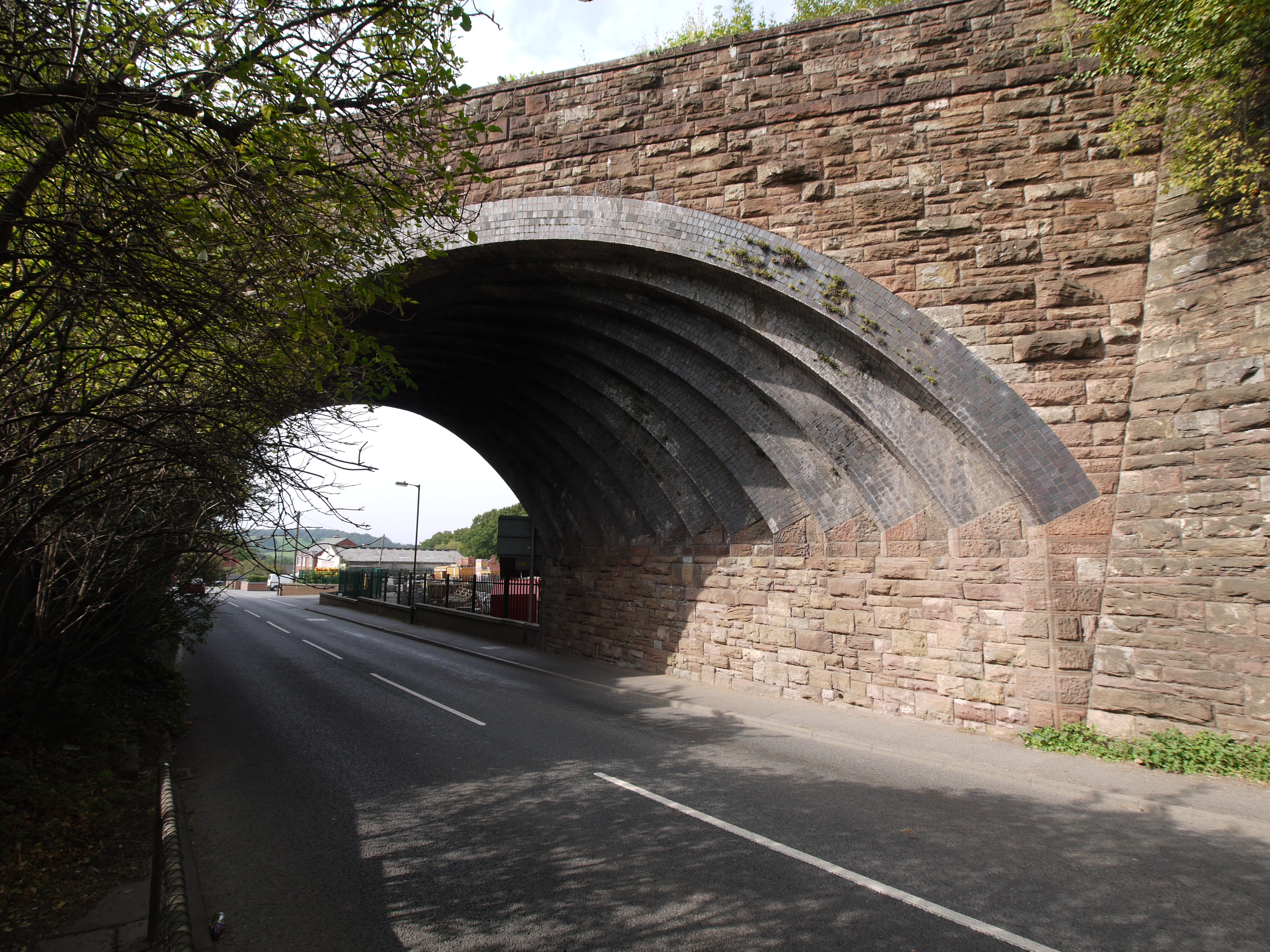
Hereford Road Skew Bridge, Ledbury, Herefordshire, a ribbed skew arch made of stone with ribs of blue brick

The ribbed skew arch is a form of the false skew arch in which several narrow regular arches or ribs, offset laterally with respect to one another, are used to approximate a true skew arch. Motivated by the lack of skilled stonemasons in the 18th century United States, the design was first proposed in 1802 for a crossing of the Schuylkill River in Philadelphia by British-born American architect Benjamin Henry Latrobe and later championed by French civil engineer A. Boucher. Because the series of arch ribs are all regular arches this method of construction has the advantage of being less demanding of unskilled artisans but it has received considerable criticism as being weak, susceptible to frost damage, ugly and wasteful of materials. Although Latrobe's bridge was never built as proposed, his method of construction was later to be used extensively by the Philadelphia and Reading Railroad throughout the Philadelphia area, including an ambitious viaduct designed by Gustavus A. Nicolls with six skewed spans of 70 feet (21 m) across the river and six more land-based skew arches, which was built close to the site of Latrobe's proposed bridge and completed in 1856. Thanks to the reinforcing of the spandrel walls in 1935, the bridge continues to carry rail traffic to this day.

The Midland Railway in the United Kingdom suffered from no such shortage of skilled workers but as part of its southern extension towards its London terminus at St Pancras, it was faced with the need to cross Southdown Road in Harpenden at an extremely acute angle of approximately 25°, a figure more acute than the theoretical limit of 25°40′ proposed by Buck, and requiring a bridge with a skew angle of 65°, a situation not unlike that faced by the London and Birmingham railway 30 years earlier at Denbigh Hall. This time the chosen solution was to build Southdown Road bridge as a ribbed skew arch, which opened for traffic in 1868 and was successfully widened in 1893 when the line was converted to quadruple track. Despite the aforementioned criticisms of the design, the bridge is still standing and in daily use by express and commuter trains.

A smaller and less extremely skewed example is Hereford Road bridge in Ledbury, Herefordshire, which was built in 1881 to carry the Ledbury and Gloucester Railway at an angle of approximately 45° across the Hereford Road, now a section of the A438. The railway having closed in 1959, it is now used as part of a footpath.

Notice that the two bridges in the photographs skew in opposite directions. Southdown Road bridge is said to have a left-hand skew due to the near face being offset to the left of the far face, while Hereford Road bridge has a right-hand skew.

== Construction ==
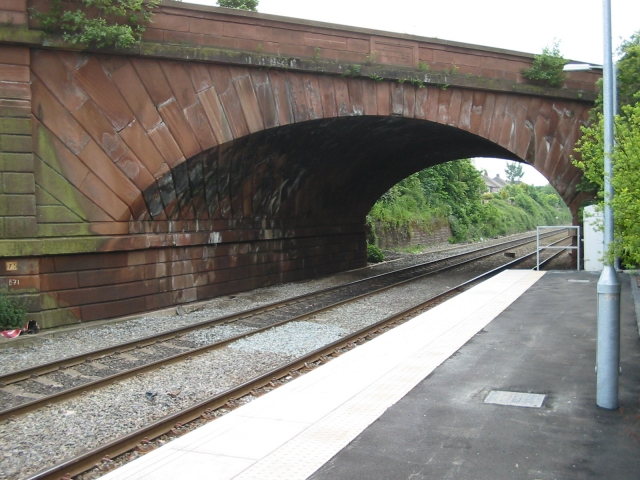
Rainhill Skew Bridge from Rainhill Station

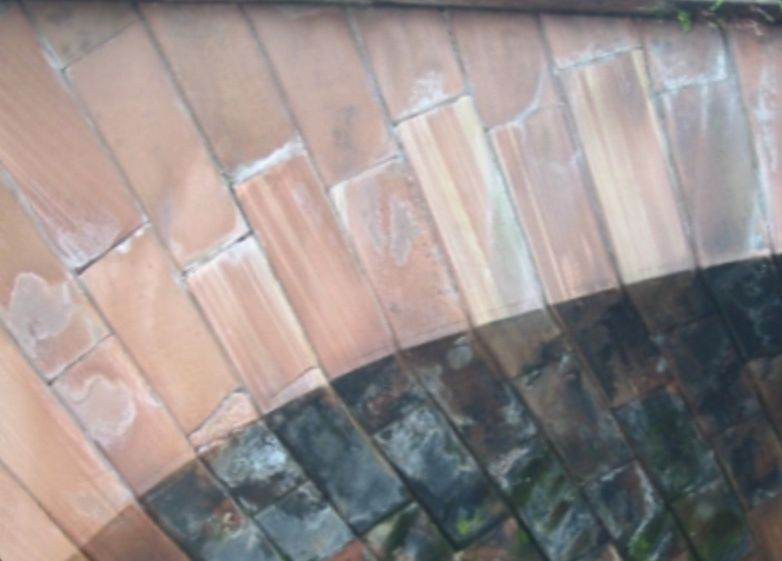
A close-up of the stonework of Rainhill Bridge

Early skew arch bridges were painstakingly built from masonry blocks, each individually and expensively cut to its own unique shape, with no two edges either parallel or perpendicular. A fine example of such construction is the famous Rainhill Skew Bridge, which was designed with a skew span of 54 feet (16 m), in order to give a clear span across the railway of 30 feet (9.1 m) at a skew angle of 56° by George Stephenson and built as a full-sized wooden model in an adjacent field before being completed in 1830.

A contemporary skew bridge built to carry the Haggerleazes branch of the Stockton and Darlington Railway over the River Gaunless in County Durham proved too difficult for the original contractors, Thomas Worth and John Batie, who, after piling the foundations for the abutments and laying the lower courses of masonry, abandoned the work. The contract was re-let to James Wilson of Pontefract on 28 May 1830 for £420, an increase of £93 over the original tender. As the principles were not completely understood, the work continued to prove difficult and its imminent collapse was solemnly predicted right up until the time, a few days before the opening of the branch, the centring was removed and the crown of the arch settled by less than half an inch (13 mm).

== Examples of skew arch bridges ==
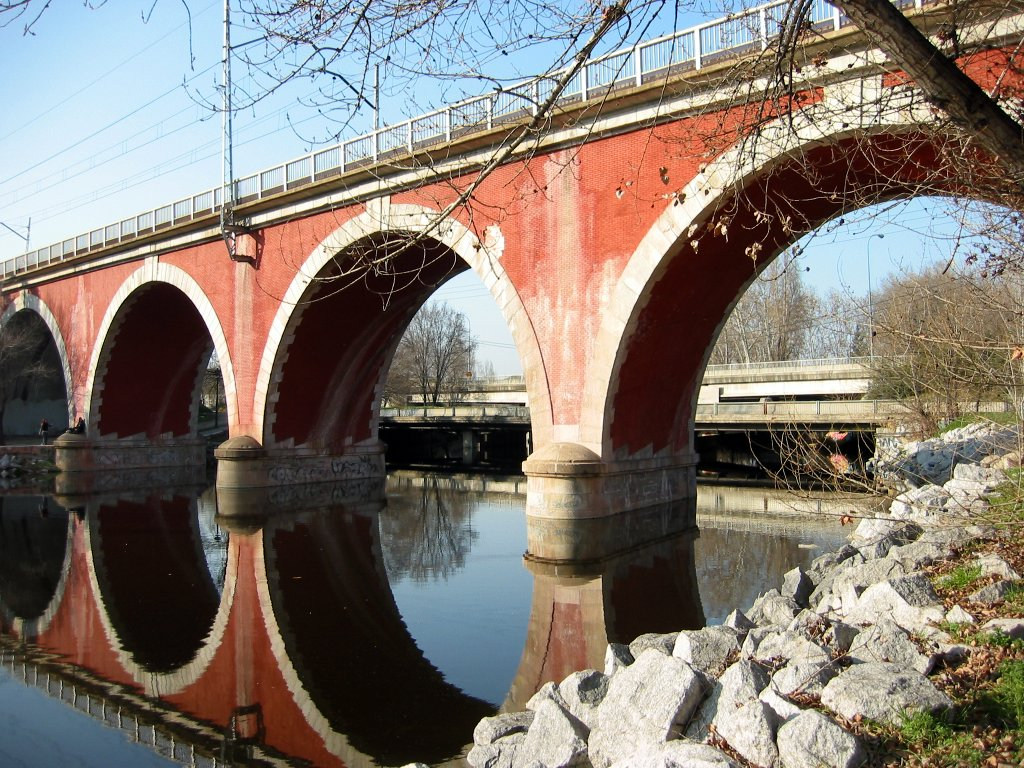
Puente de los Franceses, Madrid

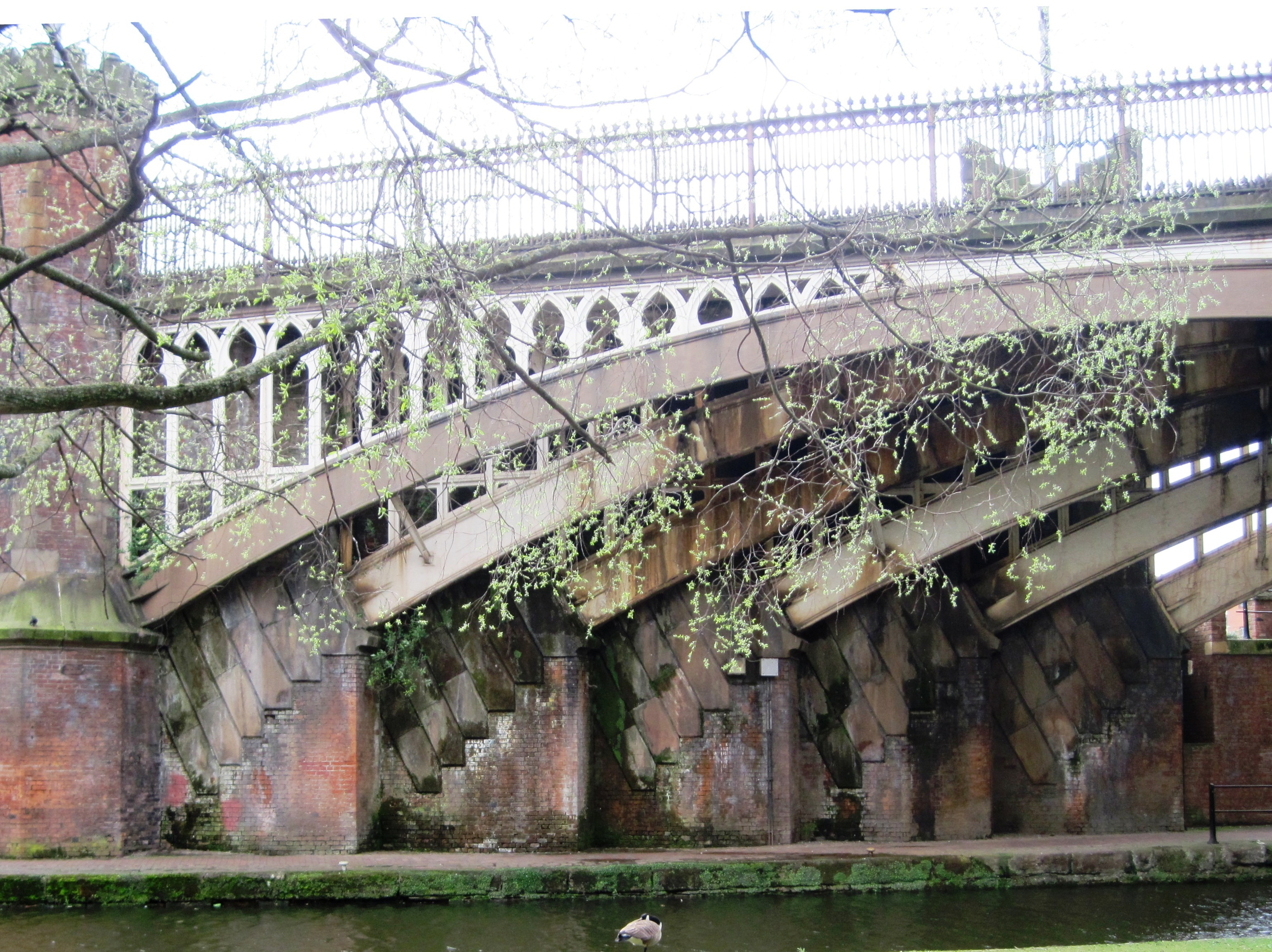
Rochdale Canal Bridge, Manchester

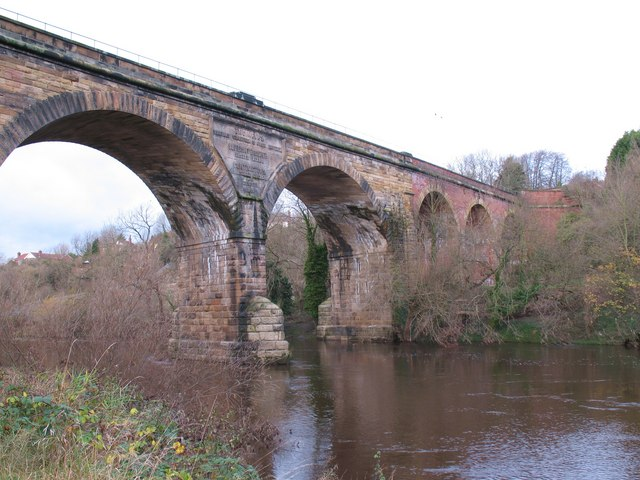
The two skew arches of Yarm Viaduct, North Yorkshire

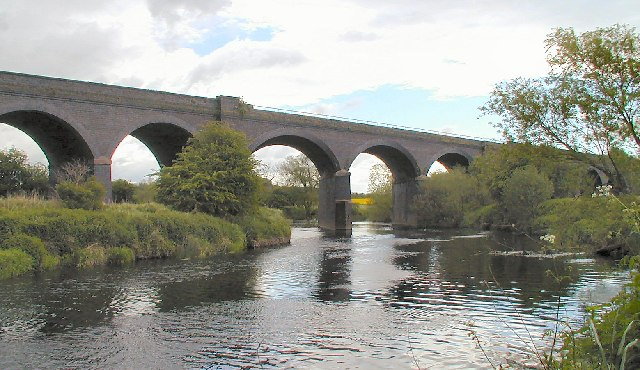
Stanford Viaduct crossing the River Soar, Leicestershire

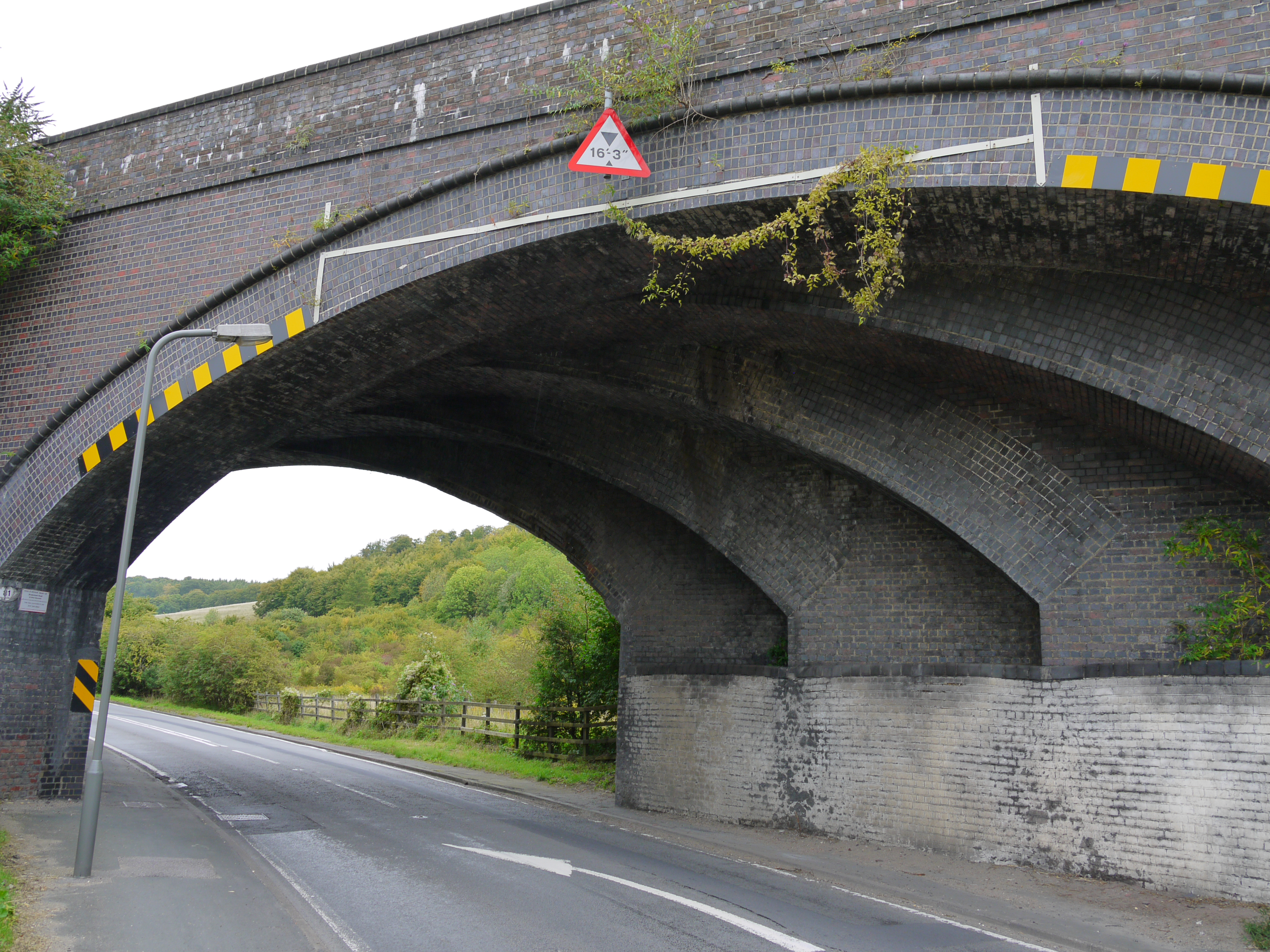
Bradenham Road Bridge, near High Wycombe, Buckinghamshire

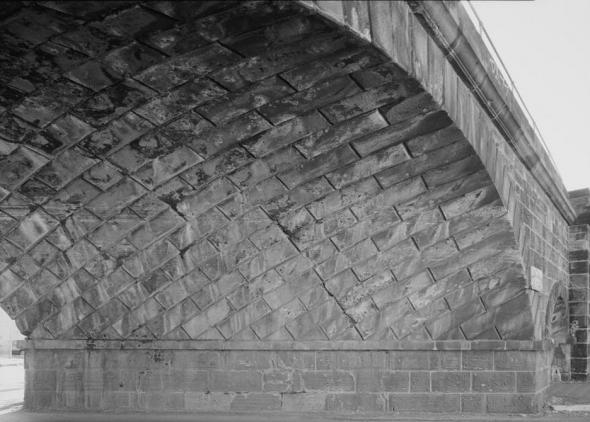
Skew Arch Bridge in Reading, Pennsylvania

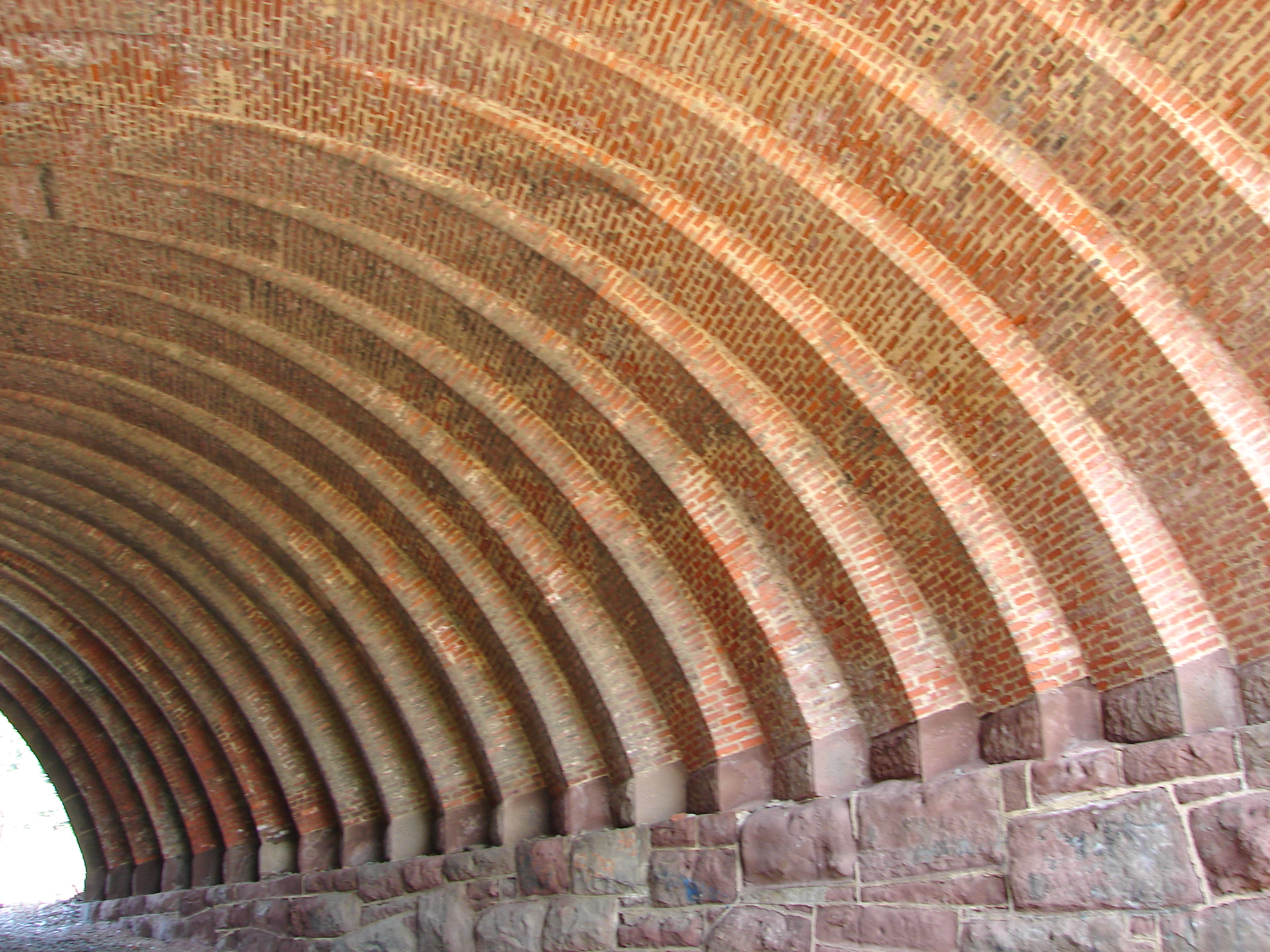
Thirty-third Street Bridge in Philadelphia

=== Ireland ===
- Finlay Bridge, Naas, County Kildare by William Chapman (Kildare Canal, 1787).

=== Malta ===
- Arco Barbara, Floriana Lines, Floriana by Giovanni Barbara (1726).
- Qormi scew arch.

=== Spain ===
- Puente de los Franceses, Madrid (Compañía de los Caminos de Hierro del Norte de España, 1862), a brick railway viaduct with five full-centred skew arches and stone quoins.

=== United Kingdom ===
- Store Street Aqueduct, Manchester by Benjamin Outram (Ashton Canal, 1798).
- Rainhill Skew Bridge, Merseyside by George Stephenson (Liverpool and Manchester Railway, 1830), the first skew bridge to carry a road over a railway.
- Haggerleazes Bridge over the River Gaunless near Cockfield, County Durham, by Thomas Storey (Stockton and Darlington Railway, 1830), the first skew bridge to carry a railway over a river.
- The viaduct between London Bridge and Greenwich stations (London and Greenwich Railway, 1834–1836), a long and complex structure, which has subsequently been widened on both its southern (1842) and northern (1850) sides, and also extended westwards to Charing Cross (1864) and northwards to Cannon Street (1866). Helicoidal skew brickwork is visible at several locations where it spans existing roads that cross the line at oblique angles.
- Boxmoor Railway Bridge, adjacent to what is now Hemel Hempstead station, Hertfordshire by George W. Buck (London and Birmingham Railway, 1836–1837), a brick arch with stone quoins and a 58° angle of skew built to a very high standard of workmanship by contractors W. and L. Cubitt of London.
- Leeds and Liverpool Canal bridge number 74A, near Chorley, Lancashire by Alexander J. Adie (Bolton and Preston Railway, 1838), built to Sang's logarithmic pattern.
- Moulsford Railway Bridge, Oxfordshire by Isambard Kingdom Brunel (Great Western Railway, 1838–1839), widened by the building of an adjacent parallel bridge in 1892 to carry a second pair of tracks.
- The original West Bridge over the River Avon adjacent to Bath (Spa) station by Isambard Kingdom Brunel (Great Western Railway, 1840), comprising two 80-foot (24 m) span skew arches made from laminated timber ribs. It was replaced with the present wrought iron skew lattice girder bridge between 1875 and 1878, using the original abutments and central pier.
- Monkhide Skew Bridge, Monkhide, Herefordshire by Stephen Ballard (Herefordshire and Gloucestershire Canal, 1843).
- Rewe Skew Bridge, Rewe, Devon by William Froude (Bristol and Exeter Railway, 1844), one of possibly only two examples in Britain of the corne de vache method of brick construction pioneered by Froude, the other being at Cowley Bridge Junction on the same line.
- Rochdale Canal Bridge and Castle Street Bridge, Manchester (Manchester, South Junction and Altrincham Railway, 1849). These are contiguous skew spans, each of six cast iron spandrels, carrying the railway line used by the Manchester to Preston and the Liverpool to Manchester services adjacent to Deansgate station.
- Yarm Viaduct, Yarm, North Yorkshire by Thomas Grainger and John Bourne (Leeds Northern Railway, 1849–51), has two stone skew arches where it spans the River Tees and 41 brick right arches.
- Neidpath Viaduct, Neidpath, Peeblesshire by Robert Murray & George Cunningham (Caledonian Railway, 1864).
- Lyne Viaduct, Lyne, Peeblesshire (Caledonian Railway, 1864).
- Southdown Road Skew Bridge, Harpenden, Hertfordshire by Charles Liddell and William H. Barlow (Midland Railway, 1868), a ribbed skew arch built of brick.
- Kielder Viaduct, Kielder, Northumberland by John Furness Tone (North British Railway, 1862), a stone skew viaduct constructed in line with Nicholson's instructions.
- Hereford Road Skew Bridge, Ledbury, Herefordshire (Ledbury and Gloucester Railway, 1881), a ribbed skew arch made of stone and blue brick.
- Sickergill Skew Bridge, near Penrith, Cumbria by George Joseph Bell, County Surveyor (a post previously held by Peter Nicholson) and Bridge Master of Cumberland (Raven Beck at Renwick, 1898), a single arch masonry skew bridge that is interesting for having been photographed during construction.
- Stanford Viaduct, near Loughborough, Leicestershire (Great Central Railway, 1899), a blue brick structure, the three central arches of which are skewed in order to cross the River Soar.
- Bradenham Road Bridge, near High Wycombe, Buckinghamshire (Great Western and Great Central Joint Railway, 1905), a ribbed skew arch built of blue brick, which carries the Chiltern Main Line over the A4010 road.
- Beneath Springfield Road in Swindon, the disused Midland and South Western Junction Railway has a complex bridge consisting of a normal arch and a skew arch butted together; the brick courses in the roof change from normal to helical approximately two-thirds of the way through. This accommodates a road junction above.

=== United States ===
- Allegheny Portage Railroad Bridge (1834–1854).
- Colorado Street Bridge, Saint Paul, Minnesota, by Andreas W. Munster (1888), a false skew arch built with the stone courses parallel to the abutments.
- Schuylkill River Viaduct, Fairmount Park, Philadelphia by Gustavus A. Nicolls (Philadelphia and Reading Railroad, 1856), a ribbed skew arch viaduct made of stone.
- Seventh Street Improvement Arches, Saint Paul, Minnesota by William A. Truesdell (St. Paul and Duluth Railroad, 1883–1884), a pair of helicoidal semicircular masonry arches with a skew angle of 27 degrees.
- Jackson Street Bridge, Silver Creek, New York (1869).
- Skew Arch Bridge (Reading, Pennsylvania), helicoidal arch by Richard Osborne (1857).
- Thirty-third Street Bridge in Philadelphia, Pennsylvania, ribbed brick arch (1902).
- Yalesville Underpass, Wallingford, Connecticut, by William MacKenzie (1838).

== See also ==
- Arch
- Arch bridge
- Viaduct

== Notes ==
1. The skew angle or angle of skew, θ is the angle between the centre line of the arch barrel and the perpendicular to the face of the arch. A regular arch is defined as having a zero angle of skew. The angle of obliquity, Ω is the complement of the angle of skew, though there is some confusion in a number of the 19th century texts where angle of skew and angle of obliquity tend to be used interchangeably.
2. The skew span or span on the skew, S is the span of the arch measured parallel to its face. This is the actual span of the skew arch, for which it must be engineered, and it is always greater than the usable span.
3. The square span or span on the square, s is the span of the arch measured perpendicular to the abutments. This is the usable span for the roadway beneath the arch (hence, it is also known as the clear span) and it is related to the skew span by the following formula: s = S cos θ .
4. The rise of a skew arch is equal to the rise of a regular arch whose span is equal to the skew span of the skew bridge. A limiting case is the full-centred or semicircular skew arch, in which case the rise is equal to the radius of the arch, or half the skew span. For segmental, three-centred, and elliptical skew arches the rise is less than this limiting case.
5. The term intrados is used because it is the mathematically correct term, referring to the curved surface of the inside of the arch barrel. The equivalent architectural term is soffit.
6. Strictly speaking, the development of the face of a skew arch is not actually a straight line, but an S-shaped curve, the curvature of which becomes more pronounced with increasing angle of skew. Nicholson therefore added a straight line, called "the approximate line", between the ends of each face on the development drawing and then drew the courses perpendicular to it. The approximate line is tangential to the curve of the face only at the crown, with the difference increasing with distance away from that point.
7. The 19th century texts use the word spiral to describe both lines and surfaces. The helix is a special case of the generic spiral and applies only to a line. It is used to describe the rifled appearance of the intrados of this particular class of skew arch: the courses follow helical paths between the imposts. The helicoid is a curved surface swept out by a radius moving in a helical path about an axial line. The bearing surfaces of a square threaded screw and its associated nut are helicoidal, and so are the bedding planes between adjacent courses of voussoirs in this class of skew arch.
8. Equilibrated courses are ones built without residual shear stresses.
9. This is the strict differential geometry definition of a cylinder, which includes both the right circular cylinder (the common cylinder with which everyone is familiar) and the right elliptic cylinder. If a helicoidal skew arch has a semicircular cross section, when taken on the square, perpendicular to the abutments, its barrel will have a shape based on the common cylinder (a semicylinder, in fact), and its cross section (taken on the skew, parallel with its faces) will be semi-elliptical. Segmental circular skew arches also have barrels based on the shape of the common cylinder, while those constructed with a semi-elliptical square section will have a flatter, wider semi-elliptical skew section. The extruded profile of a three-centred arch, strictly speaking, does not fall under this definition of a cylinder.
