= Swin Bridge =

Coordinates: 54.625536°N 1.819242°W

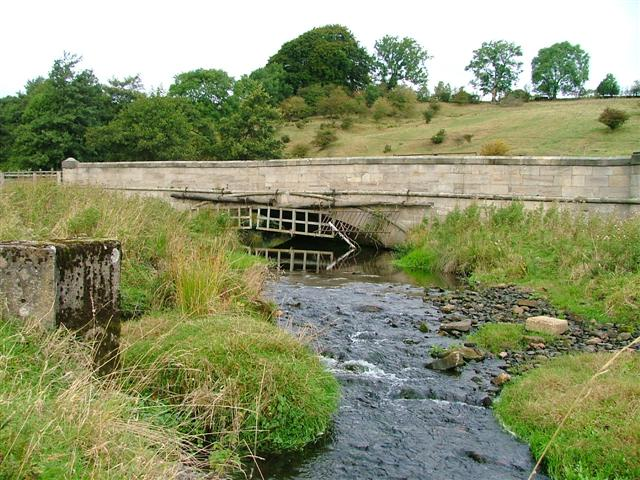
The bridge, from the South

Swin Bridge (also 'Cockfield Bridge' or 'Haggerleases Bridge') is the local name for a skew arch bridge in County Durham. It was built in 1830 for the Haggerleases branch of the Stockton and Darlington Railway, crossing the River Gaunless at Cockfield. It is important as an early example of the masonry arch skew bridge, and the first used to carry a railway.

== Skew bridges ==
Most arch bridges are constructed at right-angles to the obstruction which they cross, this being the easiest and strongest mode of building. If the obstacle runs at an angle to the new roadway though, the bridge must either have its span made wider to cross the obstacle diagonally, or else the arch must itself be skewed, so that a narrower arch can cross the obstacle more closely. A skew bridge raises the difficulty that the sideways forces in the arch are no longer acting at right-angles to their abutments. If the skew is excessive, the force across the face of the abutment may be enough to make the bridge unstable and to slip or collapse sideways.

Skew bridges had been built previously, although the maths behind their theoretical design was still in its infancy. Wooden models were generally constructed to show to the stonemasons how their masonry was intended to be laid out. The first popular theoretical technique for their design was Chapman's 'spiral method', as described in Rees's Cyclopædia. This was based on work he had done for the Kildare Canal in Ireland in 1787,. In this, the arch is considered as a series of arch slices, parallel to the arch faces and at an angle to the abutments. The arch soffit (the curved underside) is drawn out into a flat plane, a parallelogram grid drawn on this, and then these diagonal lines (each one representing an arch slice) transferred to the centring of the constructed arch. This method had been applied to the design of Finlay Bridge at Naas, employing an arch barrel based on a circular segment that is smaller than a semicircle – also a feature of the low-arched Swin Bridge. This method was later described in standard texts on railway masonry, such as Nicholson.

Only one skew-arch had been used on a railway before: the Rainhill Skew Bridge on the Liverpool and Manchester Railway. This was designed by George Stephenson, although it was an overbridge carrying the turnpike road across the railway. The Rainhill bridge has achieved a fame perhaps out of proportion to its innovation. It was neither the first skew bridge, nor an innovative new design technique by Stephenson, being based on Chapman's spiral technique.

== Construction ==
The designer of the bridge has been given as either the railway's civil engineer Thomas Storey or as George Stephenson, the railway's overall engineer. (Note: As the same source also claims that the bridge has since been demolished, it is perhaps not entirely accurate about this bridge.)

The first contractors engaged to build the bridge were Thomas Worth and John Batie, the agreed price being £327. After 3½ months, having laid the foundations, they abandoned the work, over concerns about the stability of the skew arch. James Wilson of Pontefract was next engaged, for a payment to be £420. Wilson is commemorated by a dated inscribed panel on the north side of the bridge.

The bridge has an unusually great skew angle of 63°, (Note: A conventional bridge would be 0°) requiring a large skew span of 42 feet (13 m) for a bridge with a relatively small clear span of only 18 feet (5.5 m). As the bridge is in open countryside and the line is curved near this point, it is unclear why such a difficult and expensive bridge was chosen, rather than merely moving the bridge to a less-skewed position a few yards to the North. The arch is also quite shallow, with a rise of only 7 feet (2.1 m). The railbed width is 12 feet (3.7 m) and the bridge is 85 feet (26 m) long overall.

Construction is in local gritstone throughout, coursed and squared with ashlar dressings. It has a segmental arch with chamfered voussoirs and a roll-moulded dripstring above this, merging with a similar dripstring at rail-bed level. In typical S&DR style, the ends of the parapets sweep out to round scroll-like piers, capped with a low ogee-domed coping.

It was widely predicted by both engineers and laymen that such a structure would collapse when the wooden centring was removed, but on removal the bridge settled less than half an inch. It has outlived the railway and remains in excellent condition today. It is now grade II listed.
