= Store Street Aqueduct =

Listed bridge in Manchester, England

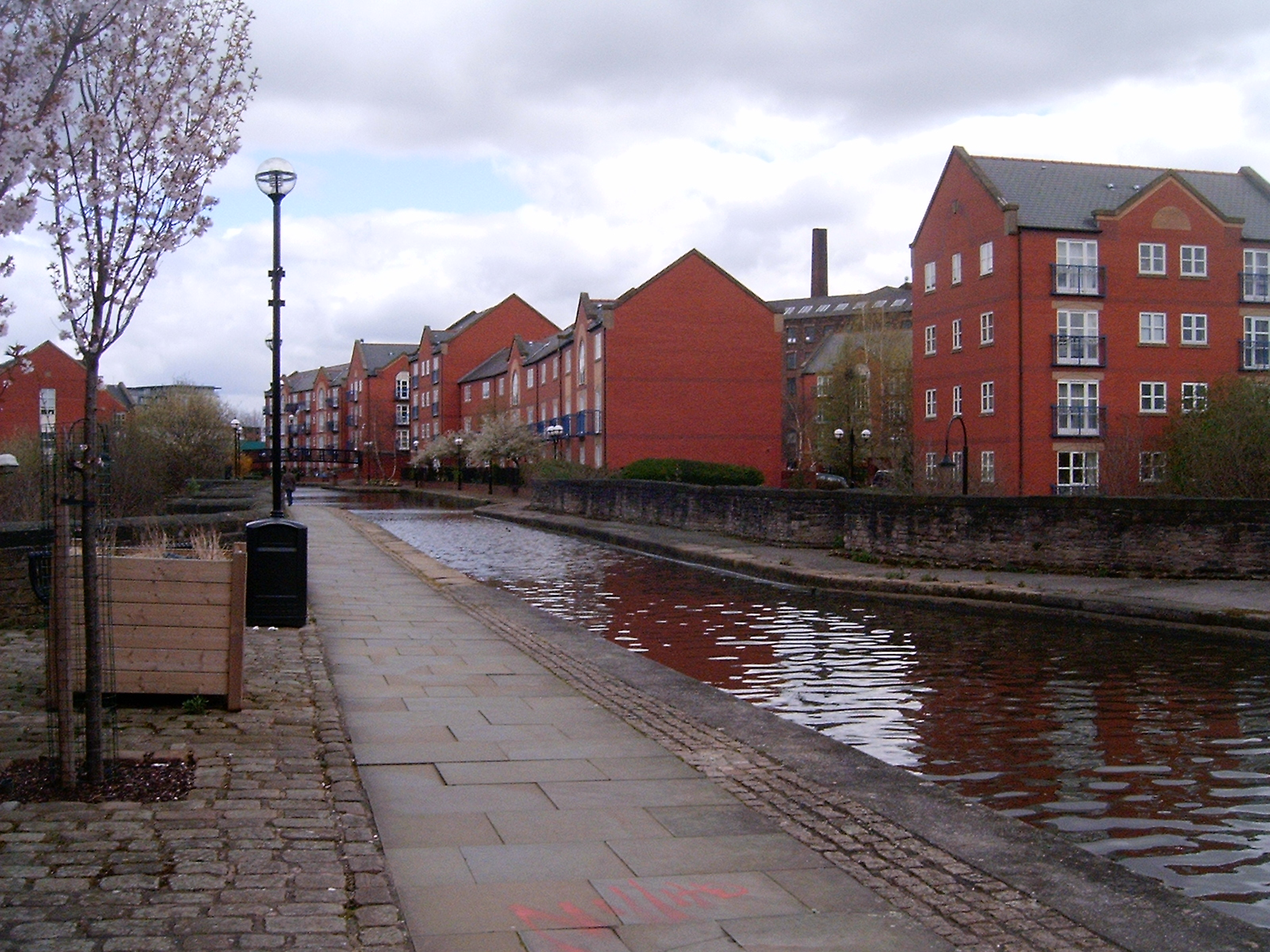
- Store Street Aqueduct at the canal level in 2008
- Coordinates: 53.4796°N 2.2274°W
- OS grid reference: SJ850981
- Carries: Ashton Canal
- Locale: Manchester, England
- Maintained by: Canal & River Trust
- Heritage status: Grade II*

Characteristics
- Trough construction: Masonry
- Total length: 220 feet (67.1 m)
- Width: 17 feet (5.2 m)
- Traversable?: Yes
- Towpaths: North side
- No. of spans: One

History
- Designer: Benjamin Outram
- Opened: 1798

Location
- Interactive map of Store Street Aqueduct

The Store Street Aqueduct in central Manchester, England, was built in 1798 by Benjamin Outram on the Ashton Canal. A Grade II* listed building, it is built on a skew of 40° across Store Street, and is believed to be the first major aqueduct of its kind in Great Britain and the oldest still in use today.

== Aqueduct ==
The aqueduct was constructed to cross Shooters Brook. It is built of stone with large voussoirs and retaining walls of coursed masonry and is 7.4 metres (24 ft) wide with triangular buttresses. The brook was culverted in about 1805 and Store Street was built over it. The canal is about 4.6 metres (15 ft) wide and 1.45 metres (4 ft 9 in) deep. The arch has a 7.6-metre (25 ft) square span and a 10.5-metre (34 ft) skew span rising 2.75 metres (9 ft) above road level.

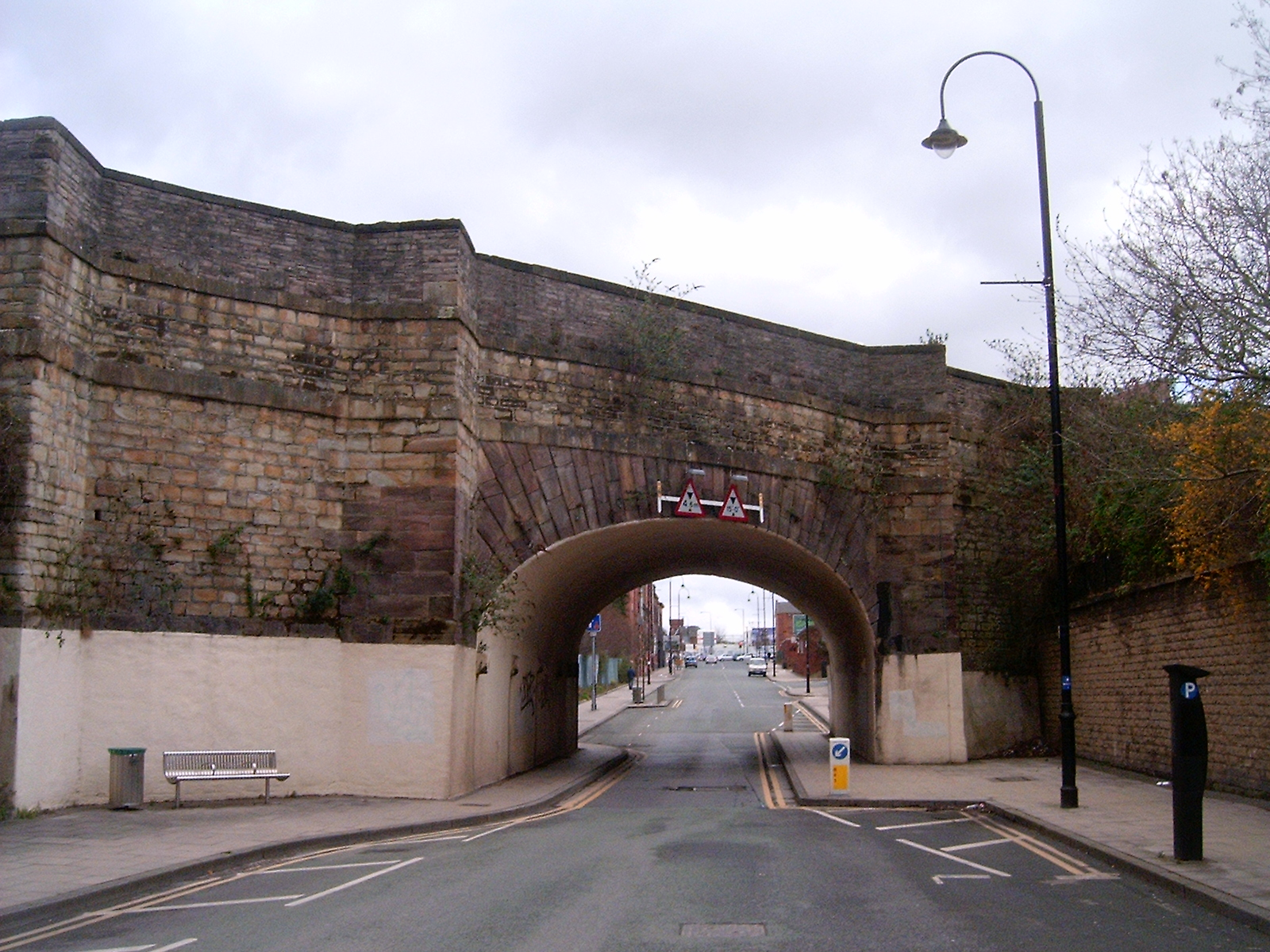
Store Street Aqueduct at Store Street level

Generally, where a canal (or later a railway) crossed a road, or vice versa, the road would be diverted to cross at right angles. It had not always been acceptable but attempts to build masonry arch bridges at an angle, or "skew", of greater than about 15 degrees had proved unsatisfactory. The method up to that time had been to build the voussoir arch with the stone coursework parallel to the abutments. This transmitted the load outward from the crown in a straight line to the foundations, parallel to the faces of the arch. If a skew was attempted, it threw the lines of force outside the abutments, leading to weakness in the structure.

William Chapman had partially solved the problem in 1787 when building bridges for the Kildare Canal, the first being the Finlay Bridge near Naas, Ireland. The Kildare was part of the Grand Canal Company, for which William Jessop had been the engineer. Jessop would no doubt have discussed it with Outram, his partner, and he experimented with the idea on the Rochdale Canal. Examples are Gorrell's Lane and March Barn road bridges, though they were possibly built later. The method used was to build timber falsework parallel to the proposed arches. Planks were laid on the falsework parallel to the abutments. The position of the courses at the crown were marked out, then those across the remainder of the arch.

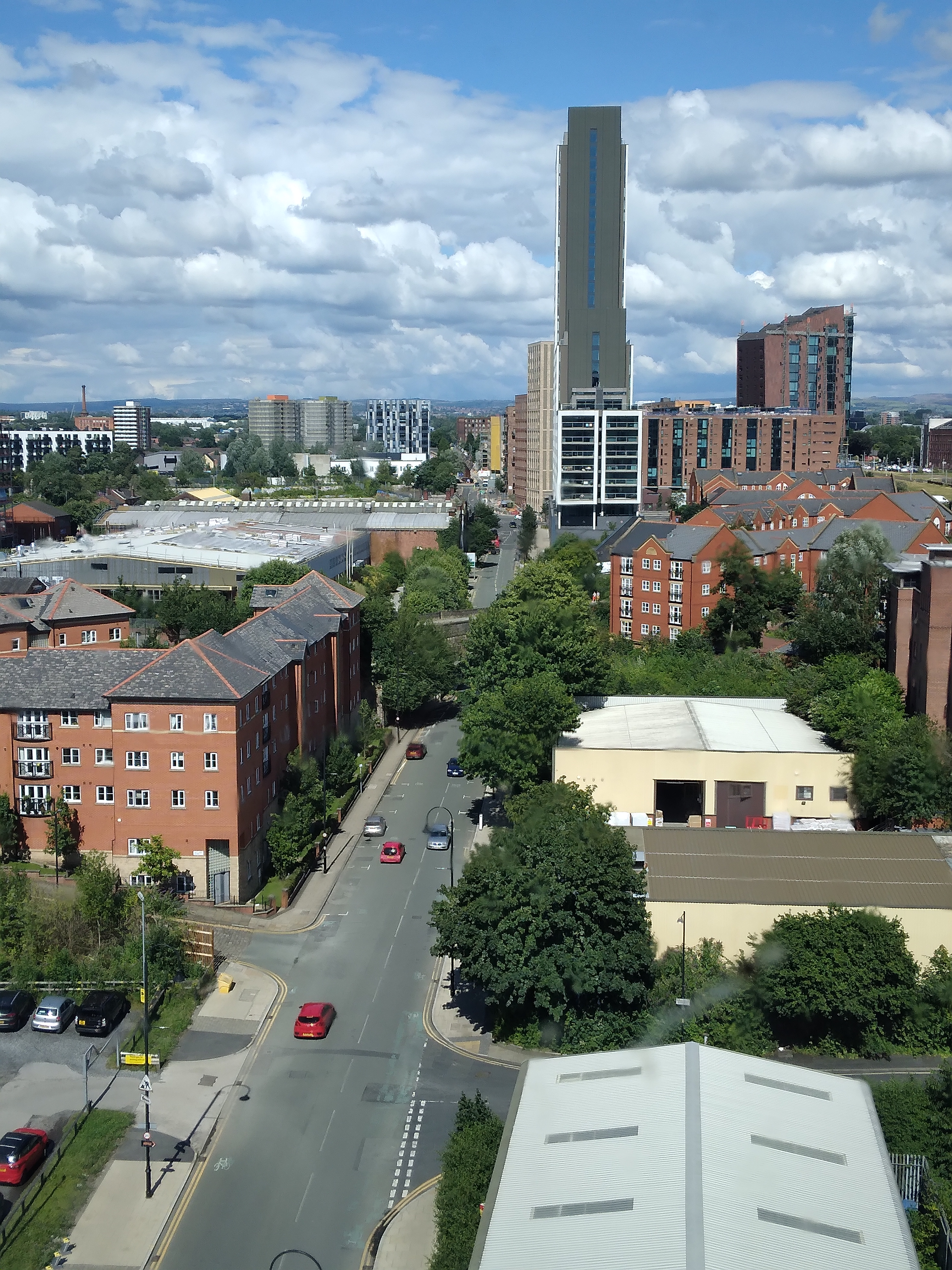
Store Street as seen from Piccadilly Gate, July 2023. The aqueduct can be seen crossing the street at an angle

Although the aqueduct still exists and is structurally sound, years of neglect led to water leakage through the joints, and the spiral construction can no longer be seen, the surface of the intrados having been rendered.

Later railway engineers improved on the system, producing what became known as helicoidal construction that became the norm in English skew bridge building. An exact solution to the problem was determined in the form of the French, or orthogonal, design. However, this was complicated and expensive to build.

== See also ==
- Grade II* listed buildings in Greater Manchester
- List of canal aqueducts in the United Kingdom
- Listed buildings in Manchester-M1
