= Southdown Road Skew Bridge =

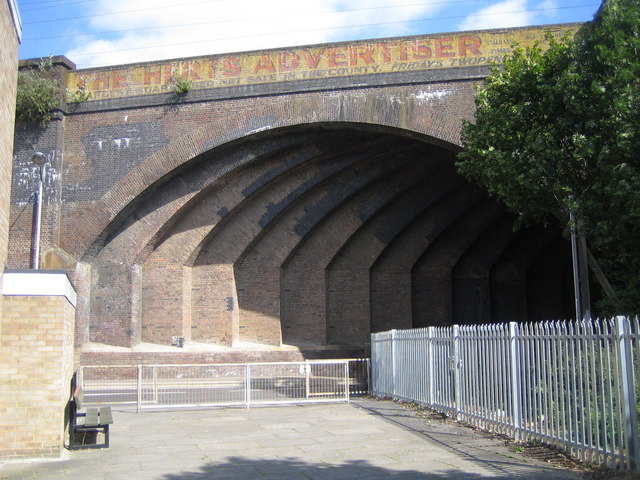
- West face of Southdown Road Skew Bridge showing the stepped nature of its intrados
- Coordinates: 51.8080°N 0.3465°W
- Carries: Midland Main Line railway
- Crosses: Minor road
- Locale: Harpenden, Hertfordshire
- Maintained by: Network Rail

Characteristics
- Design: Ribbed skew arch
- Material: Brick
- No. of spans: 1

History
- Opened: 1868

Location
- Interactive map of Southdown Road Skew Bridge

Southdown Road Skew Bridge is a ribbed skew arch railway bridge, which carries the Midland Main Line across Southdown Road in Harpenden, Hertfordshire. Built of brick by the Midland Railway and opening in 1868, it is notable for its extreme skew angle of approximately 65°.

== History ==
Located approximately 0.8 miles (1.3 km) south of Harpenden station, the bridge was built to carry a double-track standard gauge railway line across Southdown Road, which borders Harpenden Common in Hertfordshire, as part of the Midland Railway's southern extension towards its London terminus at St Pancras, and opened to traffic in 1868. Owing to the highly acute angle at which the railway crosses the road the bridge was built as a ribbed arch, a variation of the "false" skew arch and a design championed by French civil engineer A. Boucher. The bridge was widened in 1893 when the line was converted to quadruple track. On 1 January 1923 ownership of the bridge, along with the rest of the line, passed to the London, Midland and Scottish Railway and thence to the London Midland region of British Railways on nationalisation in 1948. It became a Grade II Listed structure in 1984. Following privatisation the bridge passed into the custodianship of Railtrack and it is currently the responsibility of Network Rail.

== Design and construction ==
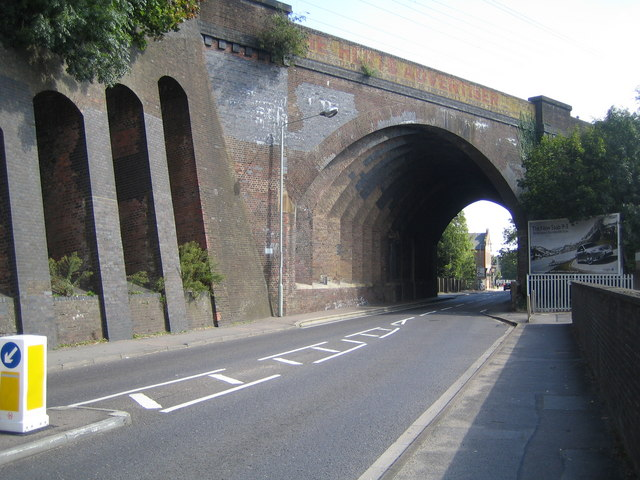
Southdown Road Skew Bridge looking along the barrel. Note the substantial retaining wall to the left of the arch.

The easiest way to visualise Boucher's concept for the ribbed skew arch is to consider a regular arch bridge that carries the railway at right angles across the road and then to slice it vertically at regular intervals along the axis of its barrel, the planes all being parallel with the faces of the bridge, rather like the way a loaf of bread is sliced. The individual slices are then slid laterally with respect to one another in order to achieve the required oblique alignment. While the intrados of a "true" skew arch is smooth and cylindrical, the intrados of this type of "false" skew arch has a stepped appearance. Thus, the need to lay helical courses of brick at such an extreme angle to the horizontal is avoided as the multitude of conjoined regular arches approximate the desired structure. Because of the extreme skew angle the span of each "slice" (known as the span on the skew) is much greater than the perpendicular distance between the abutments (known as the span on the square), the latter being the usable span for road traffic passing under the bridge. Thus, despite the impressive looking span when viewed face on, the usable span along the axis of the barrel is less so, to the extent that the road is visibly narrower where it passes under the bridge. For a "true" skew arch the ratio of the span on the square to the span on the skew is equal to the cosine of the skew angle, but for a ribbed skew arch this ratio is made even less favourable due to the steps in the barrel wall.

== See also ==
- Hereford Road Skew Bridge – a ribbed skew arch made from stone and brick.
- Skew arch – a discussion of ribbed and other forms of skew bridges.
