= Thirty-third Street Bridge in Philadelphia =

- U.S. National Register of Historic Places
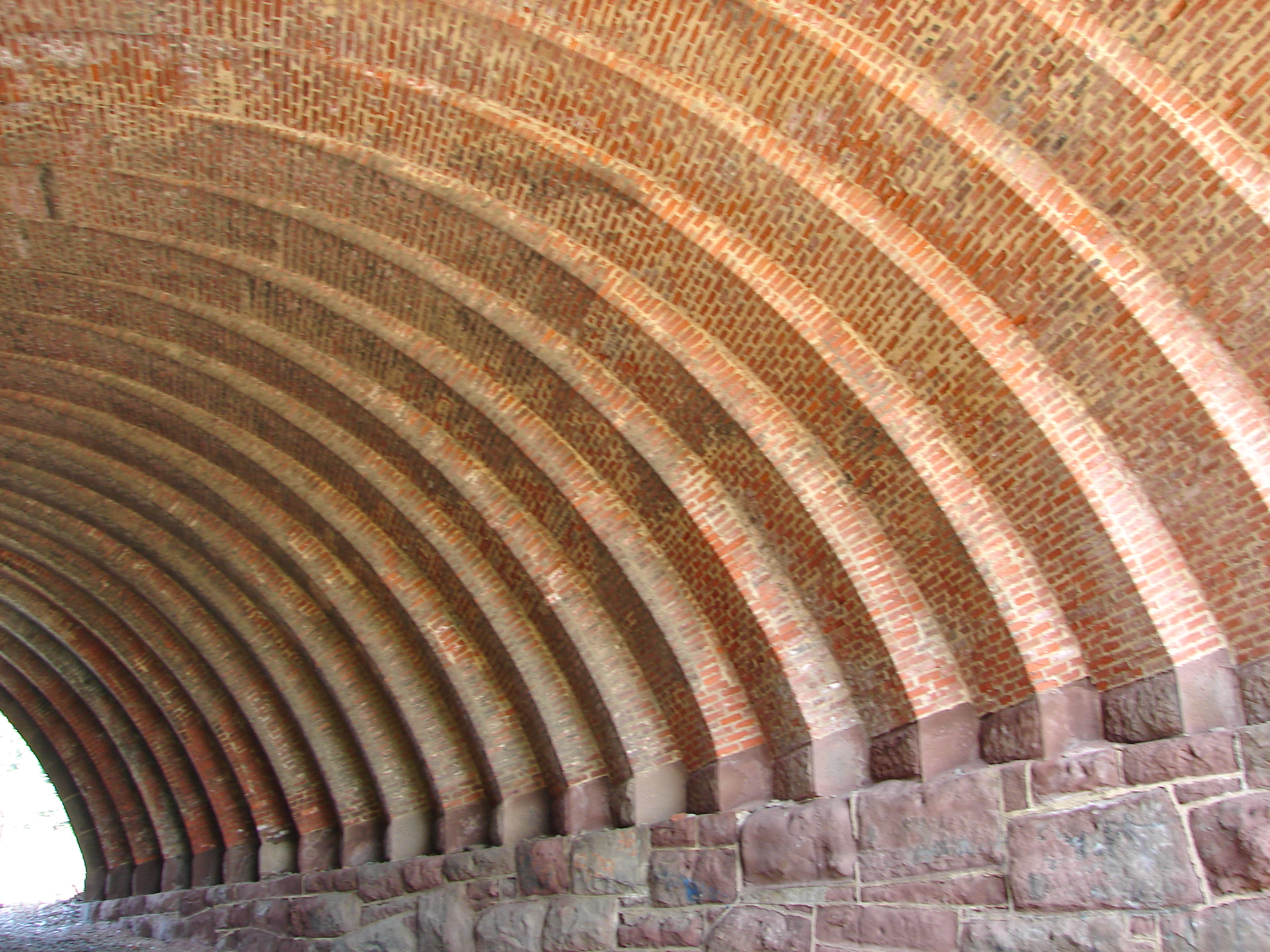
- The skewed brick ribs, looking west

- Location within Philadelphia Location within Pennsylvania Location within the United States
- Location: US 13 (Thirty-third Street) over Master St., Philadelphia, Pennsylvania
- Coordinates: 39°58′42″N 75°11′22″W
- Area: less than one acre
- Built: 1901
- Architectural style: Single span stone skew arch
- MPS: Highway Bridges Owned by the Commonwealth of Pennsylvania, Department of Transportation TR
- NRHP reference No.: 88000847
- Added to NRHP: June 22, 1988

The Thirty-third Street Bridge in Philadelphia carries Thirty-third Street (U.S. Route 13) over the former course of Master Street in the Brewerytown section of North Philadelphia, near Fairmount Park. The bridge was built in 1901 with an unusual skewed arch, and Ashlar, or dressed stone, covers the exterior of the arch, but the unusual skewed ribs are made of brick. The underpass is now inside an industrial area and normally closed even to foot traffic. The tracks of the former Pennsylvania Railroad are located just to the north and pass under a large modern bridge on Thirty-third Street.

It was listed on the National Register of Historic Places in 1988.

== Gallery ==
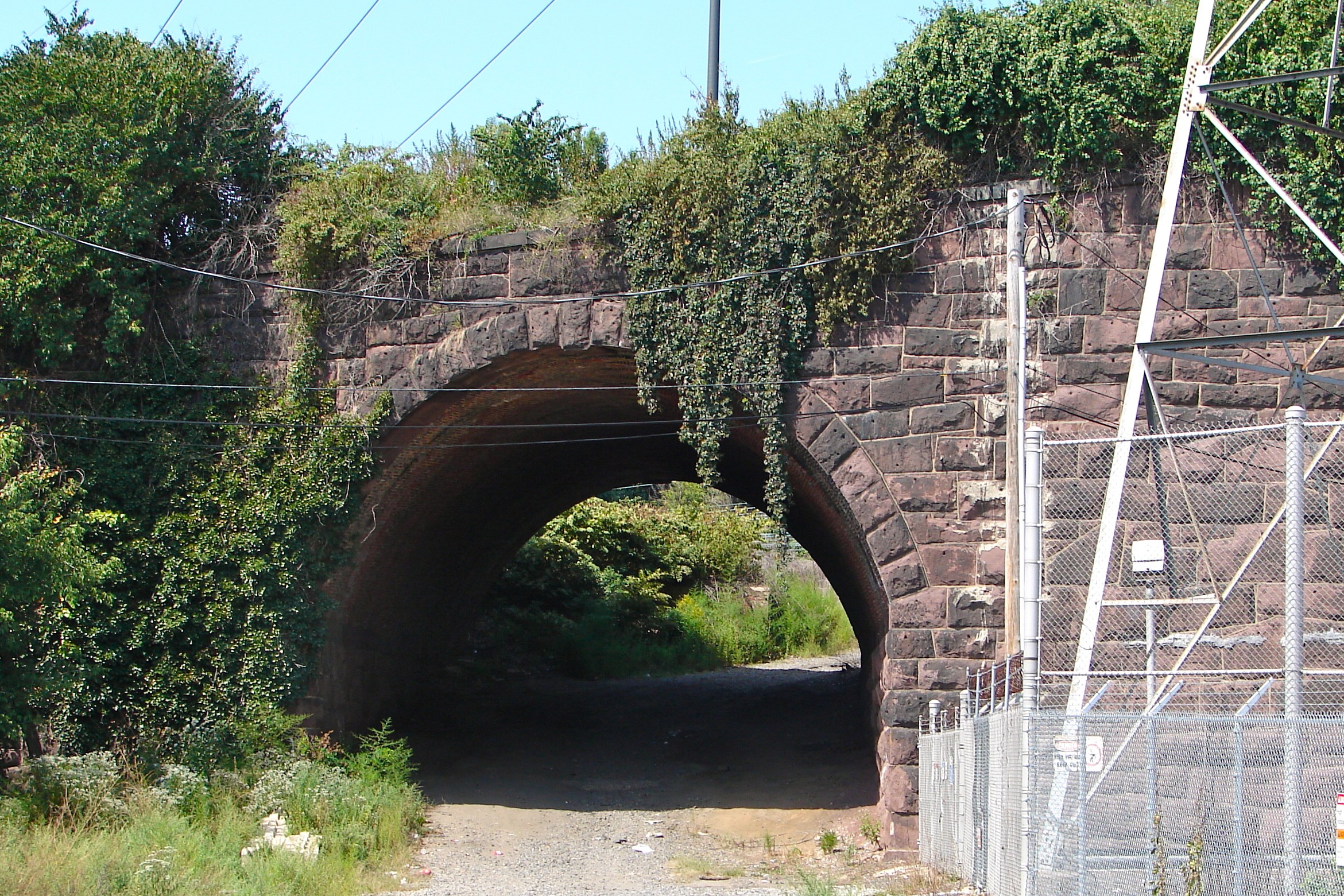
The single span stone arch, looking west

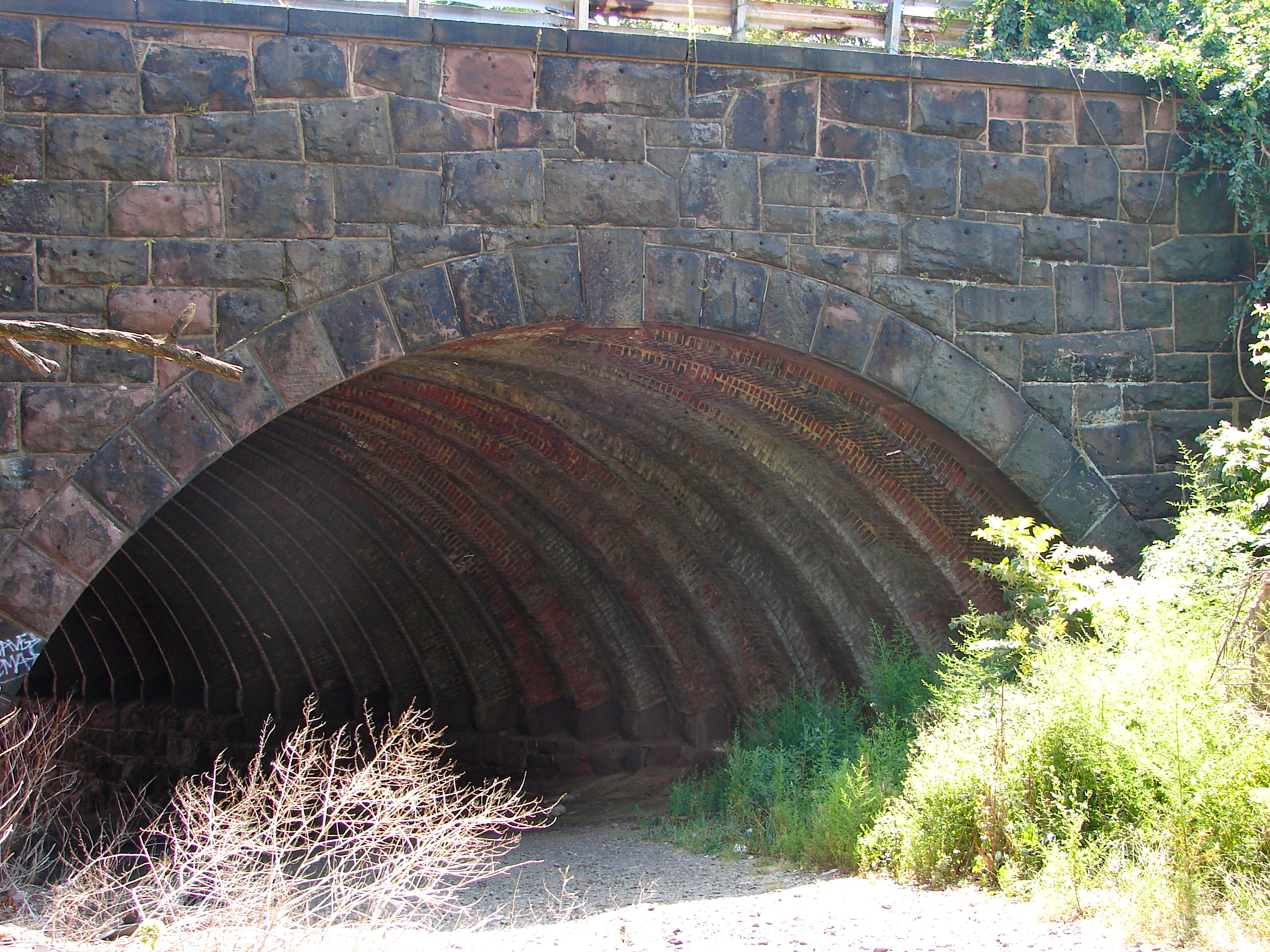
Looking east

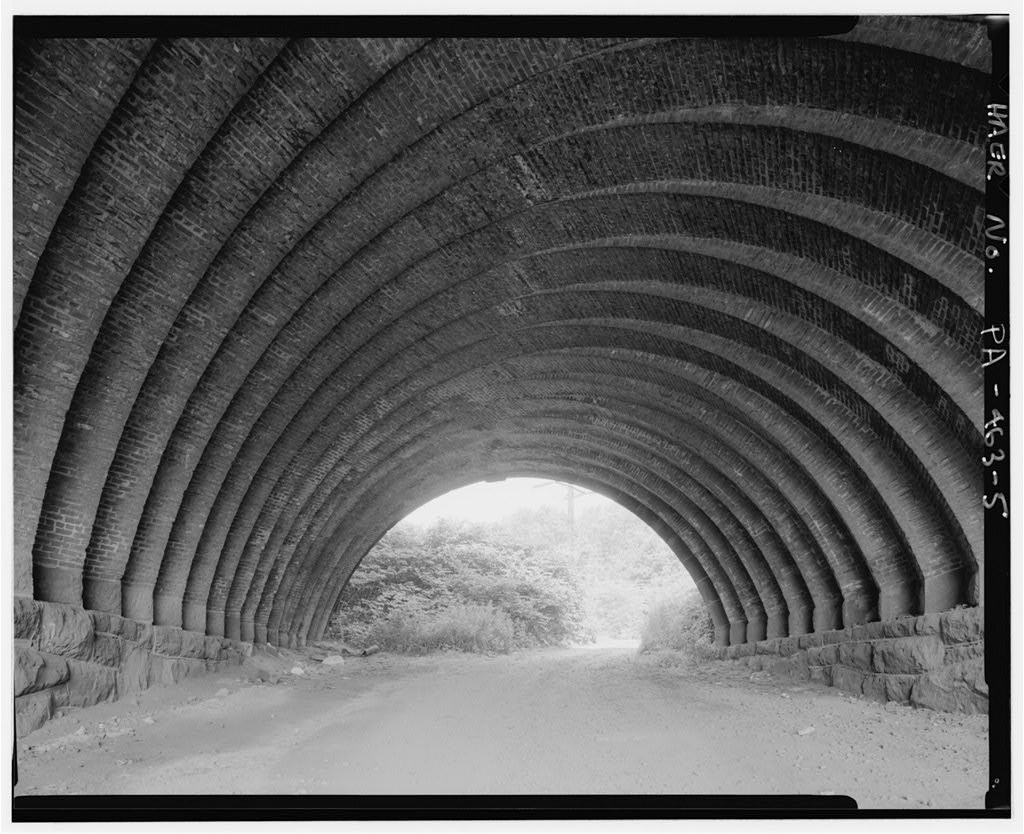
Looking west

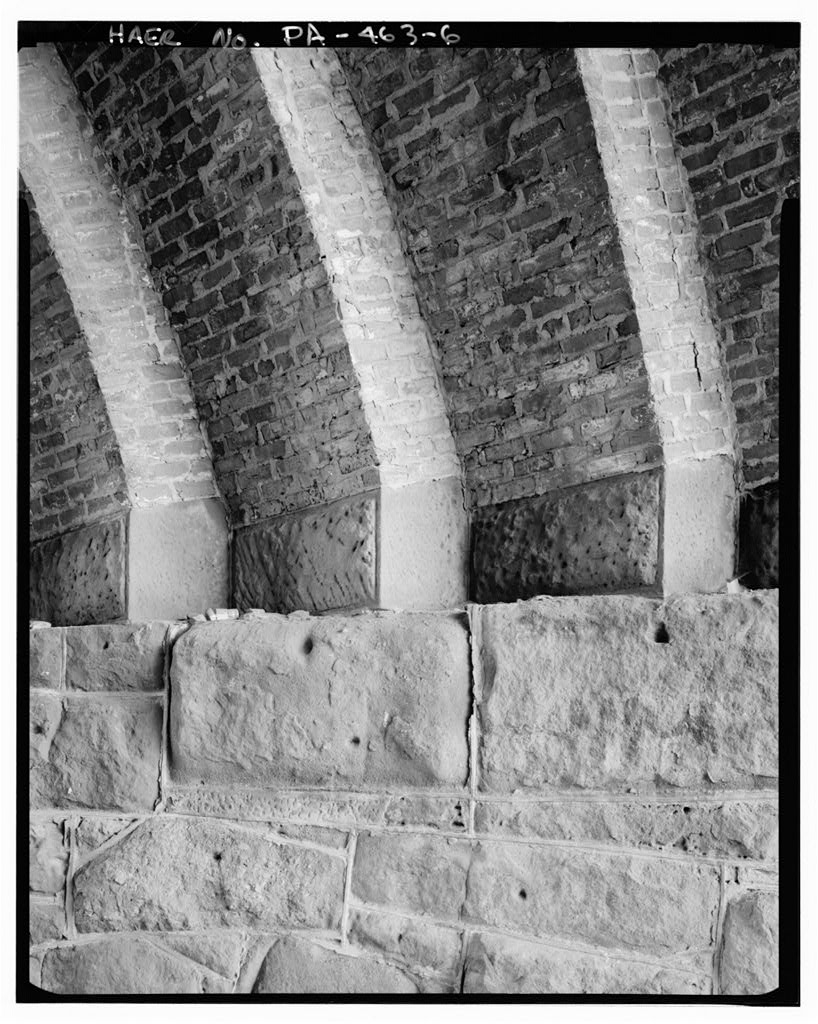
Interior stone and brickwork

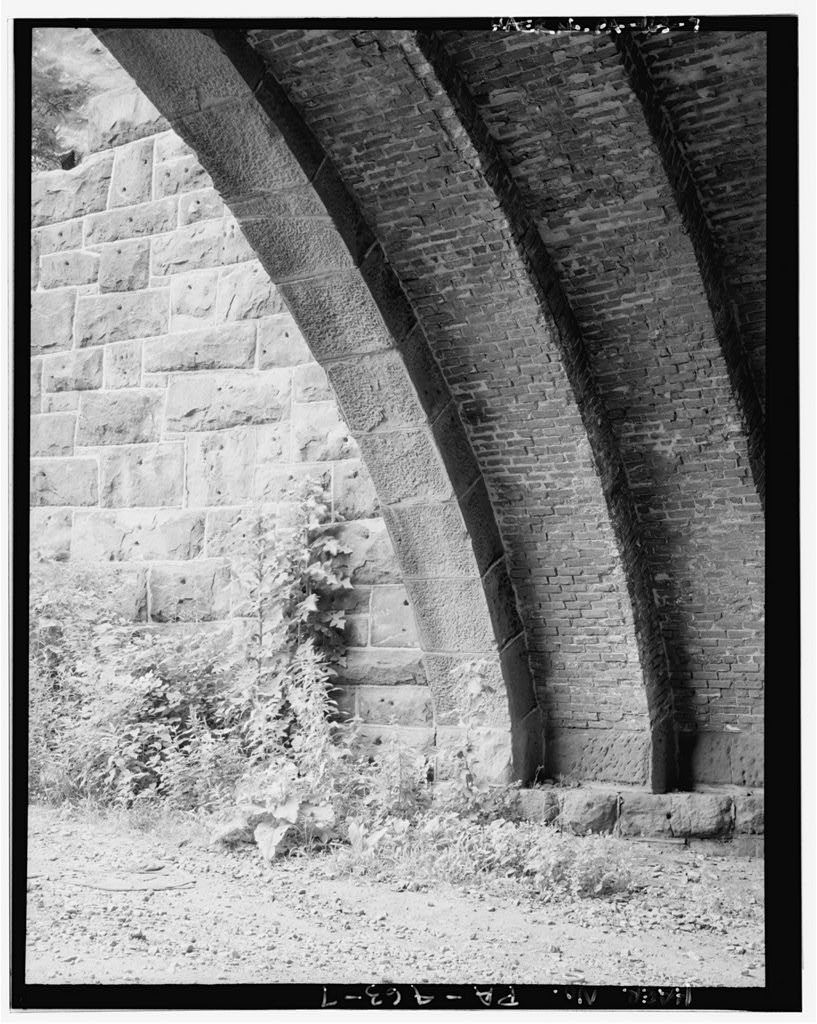
Detail at west end

== See also ==
- List of bridges documented by the Historic American Engineering Record in Pennsylvania
- List of bridges on the National Register of Historic Places in Pennsylvania
