= Skew Arch Bridge (Reading, Pennsylvania) =

- Askew Bridge
- U.S. National Register of Historic Places
- Pennsylvania state historical marker
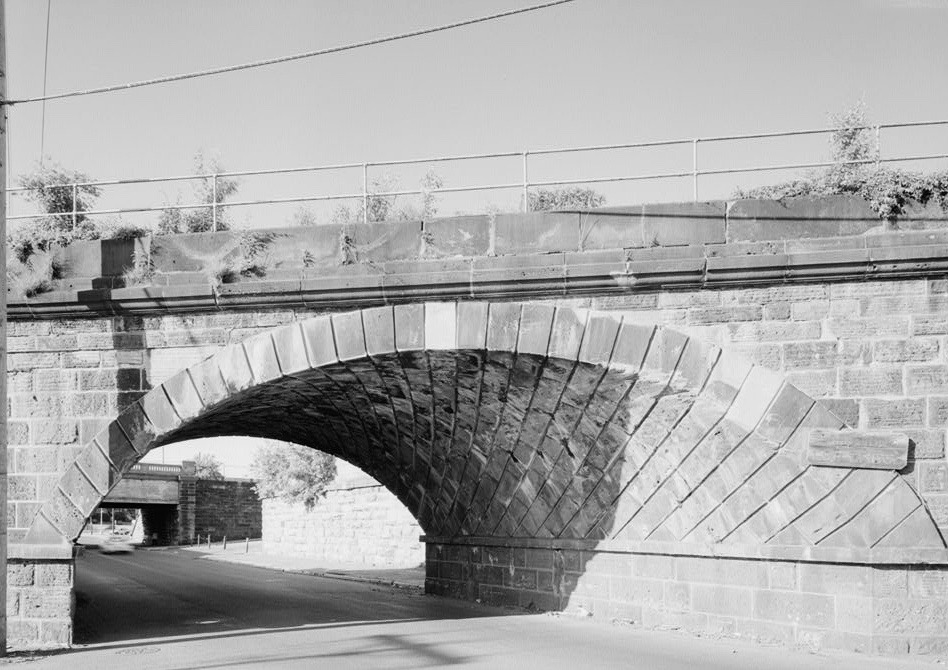
- South face in 1999

- Location within Pennsylvania Location within the United States
- Location: N. 6th Street near Woodward Street, Reading, Pennsylvania
- Coordinates: 40°20′34″N 75°55′33″W
- Area: less than one acre
- Architect: Osborne, Richard
- NRHP reference No.: 73001590

Significant dates
- Added to NRHP: March 1, 1973
- Designated PHMC: March 1, 1951

The Skew Arch Bridge in Reading, Pennsylvania, also known as the Askew Bridge and nicknamed the Soap and Whiskey Bridge, is an historic skew arch bridge that was completed in 1857. Its design enabled it to carry two tracks of the Philadelphia and Reading Railroad (P&R) at an angle over Sixth Street in Reading, Berks County, Pennsylvania.

This bridge was acquired by Conrail after the P&R's demise in 1976 and was transferred to Norfolk Southern Railway in 1999.

== History ==
The bridge was designed in 1856 by Richard Osborne, who submitted a pre-construction model to the company. Workers were partially paid with whiskey and pieces of soap, rather than entirely in cash, leading to the structure's unusual nickname.

The main arch of the bridge spans 40 feet (12 m), with two smaller arches spanning the sidewalks on either side. The courses of the arch were constructed from local brownstone in elliptical curves that follow the angle at which the railroad tracks cross the street. As a result, there is no keystone in the arch.

In 1951, the Pennsylvania Historical and Museum Commission placed a historical marker on the site; in 1973 the bridge was listed on the National Register of Historic Places.

== Gallery ==
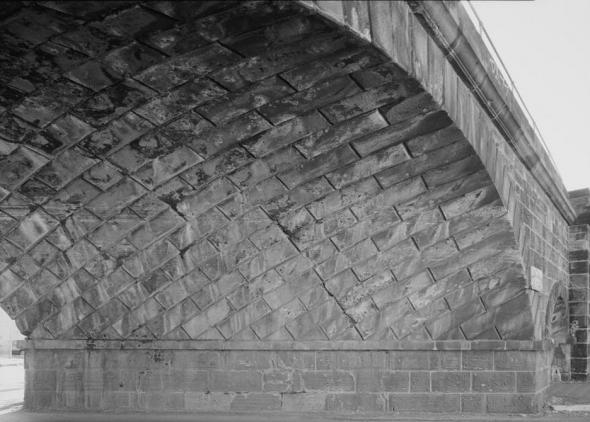
View of the courses of the arch, 1999

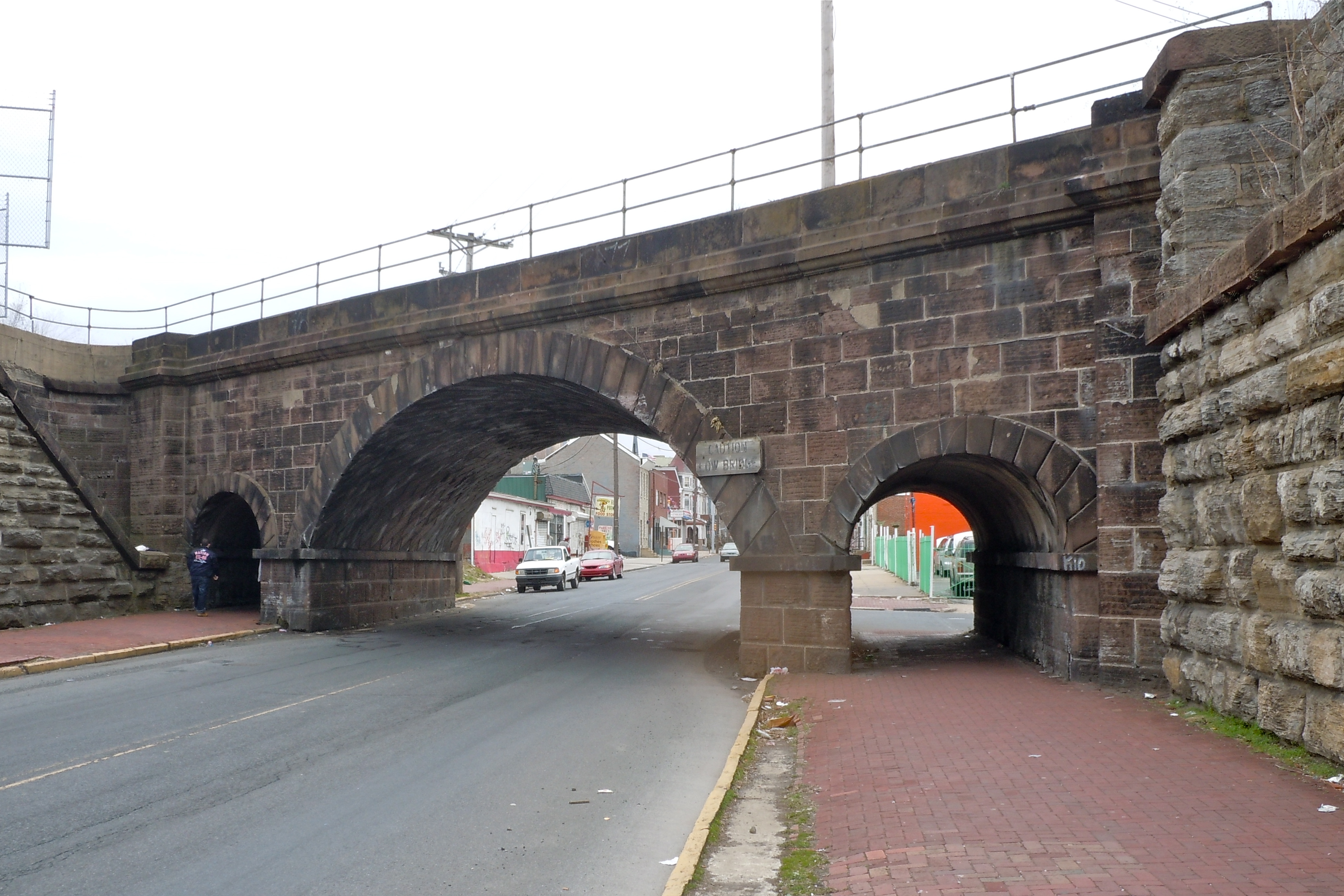
From the southeast, 2011

== See also ==
- List of bridges documented by the Historic American Engineering Record in Pennsylvania
