= Colorado Street Bridge (Saint Paul, Minnesota) =

- U.S. National Register of Historic Places
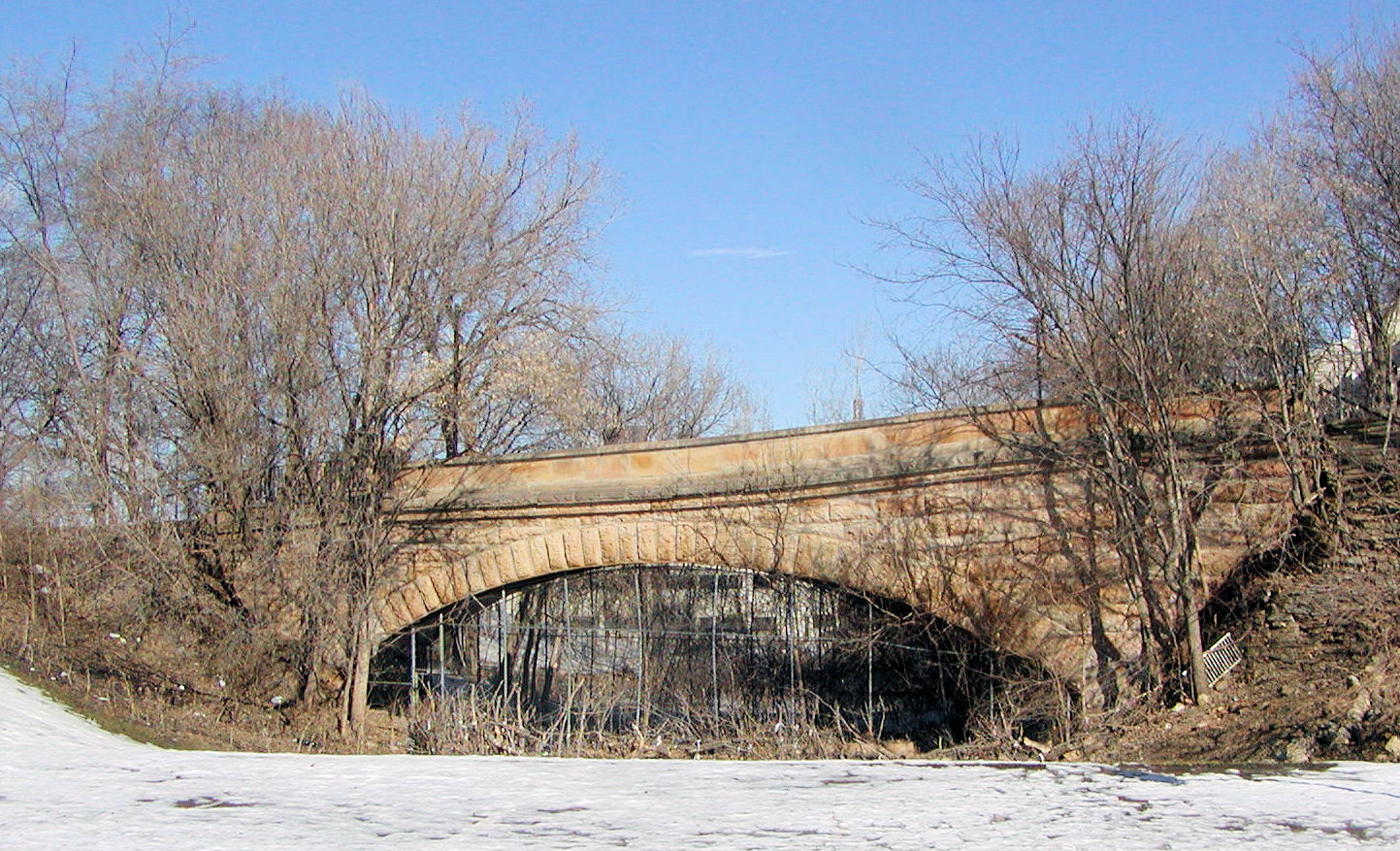
- The Colorado Street Bridge from the south

- Location within Minnesota Location within the United States
- Location: East side of South Wabasha Street near Terrace Park; Saint Paul, Minnesota
- Coordinates: 44°56′5″N 93°5′3″W
- Built: 1888
- Architect: Andreas W. Munster, O'Brien Brothers
- Architectural style: False skew arch
- MPS: Minnesota Masonry-Arch Highway Bridges MPS
- NRHP reference No.: 90000977
- Added to NRHP: July 5, 1990

The Colorado Street Bridge also known as Bridge L-8803 is a masonry and brick arch bridge in Saint Paul, Minnesota's West Side neighborhood. It is 58 feet (18 m) wide and consists of a single oblique span of 70 feet 6 inches (21.49 m) that was built with the arch courses running parallel to the abutments, leading to a weaker structure than other skew arch construction methods, known as a false skew arch. It was designed in 1888 by Andreas W. Munster of the Saint Paul Engineer's Office and is now restricted to pedestrian traffic.
