= Thomas Storey =

Australian politician

Thomas Storey (1871 – 5 January 1953) was an Australian politician. He was the younger brother of New South Wales premier John Storey, and father of Liberal Politician Sydney Storey.

He was born in Balmain to shipbuilder William John Storey and Elizabeth Graham. He was a fitter and was active in the Amalgamated Engineering Union. He was a member of the New South Wales Legislative Council from 1921 to 1934; he was a Labor member, but sat as Federal Labor in the 1930s in opposition to Jack Lang. Storey died in Balmain in 1953.
