= Ruffer =

Ruffer is an English surname. Notable people with the surname include:

- Jonathan Ruffer (born 1951), British fund manager and philanthropist
- Marc Armand Ruffer (1859–1917), Swiss-born English experimental pathologist
- Maurice Ruffer (1857–1935), French-born British banker
- Corinna Rüffer (born 1975), German politician

== See also ==
- Ruffer Investment Company, investment company listed on the London Stock Exchange
- A Ruffer & Sons, defunct family bank
