= Flambards Theme Park =

Amusement park in Cornwall, England

- Previously known as: Cornwall Aero Park; The Flambards Experience
- Interactive map of Flambards Theme Park
- Location: Culdrose Manor, Helston, Cornwall, England
- Coordinates: 50.092°N 5.258°W
- Opened: 10 June 1976
- Closed: 4 November 2024
- Owner: Hale family (1976–2013); Livingston Leisure Ltd (2013–2024)
- Slogan: "Best Day of the Week"
- Operating season: Easter–October with winter opening of undercover exhibitions
- Area: 27

Attractions
- Total: 15
- Roller coasters: 0
- Water rides: 1
- Website: www.flambards.co.uk

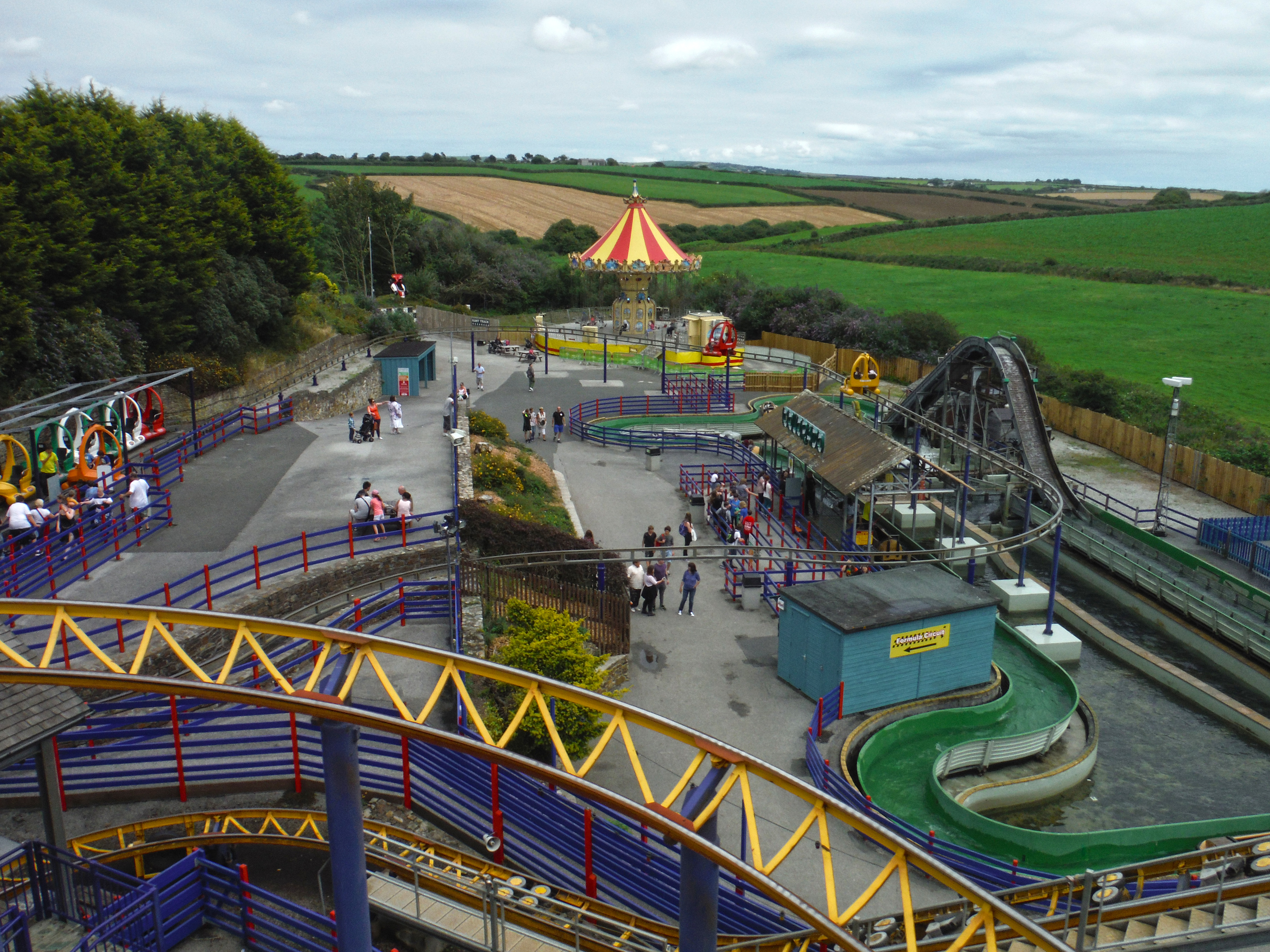
Rides at Flambards taken from the former Hornet Coaster

Flambards Theme Park is a closed amusement park on the southern outskirts of the town of Helston, Cornwall, in the United Kingdom.

It was founded in 1976 as the Cornwall Aero Park by Lieutenant Commander John Leeson and Douglas Kingsford Hale MBE. The park's final season was 2024, with the closure announced on 4 November 2024.

== History ==
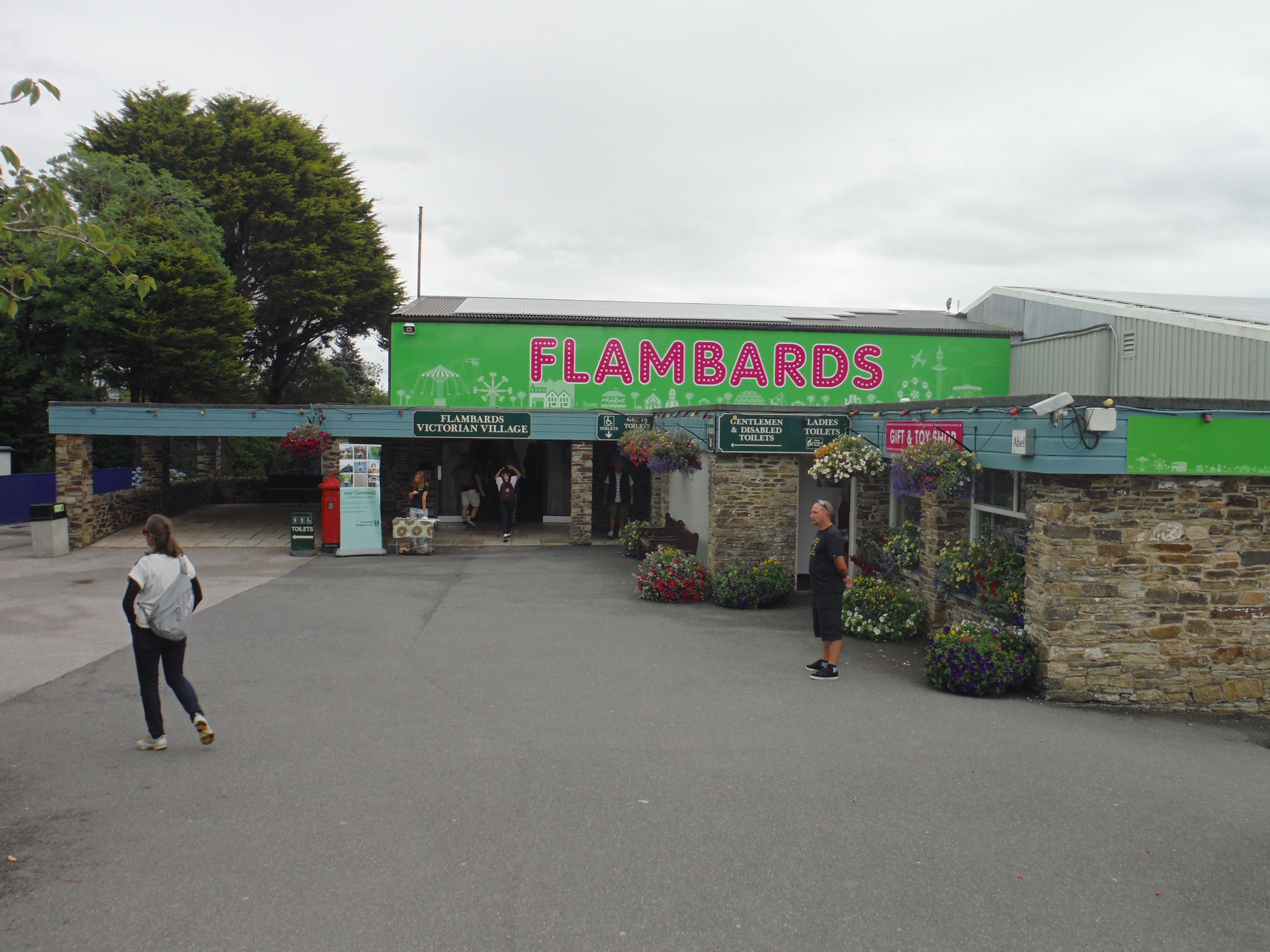
Park entrance

Flambards Theme Park first opened in 1976 under the name of 'Cornwall Aero Park'. Owned by Lieutenant Commander John Leeson and Douglas Kingsford Hale MBE, the park slowly built up an array of aircraft, models and exhibitions.

In 1984, "Britain in the Blitz," a mockup of a bomb-hit street during World War II, was opened.

By 1990, the park had grown and was renamed "The Flambards Experience." Early rides featured at the theme park included the Dragon Coaster, the Canyon River Log Flume, Paddle Boats, and the hype glide.

For the 2007 season, three rides were added: The Rocking Tug, The Carousel, and The Space Shuttle. These rides were purchased from the defunct American Adventure Theme Park in Heanor, Derbyshire after it closed the previous year.

For the 2008 season, the Cornish Mine Train ride was added and the War of the Worlds paintball game was introduced. 2009 saw no major additions to the park, however the field housing the Helipad was sold late in the season to Sainsburys. The museum exhibitions are open year-round, but the rides and play areas are open seasonally.

In 2010, the Skyraker 001 opened and claimed the title of the UK's first twisting drop tower. As well as this addition, the park was renamed to Flambards Theme Park.

On 6 December 2013, the park was bought by Livingston Leisure Ltd, an investor in the park.

In 2015, Livingston Leisure opened a new ride called the 'Sky Swinger', added screens fronted to like a picture frame to the Victorian Village.

In March 2016, Jurassic Journey, a permanent exhibition where visitors can follow in the footsteps of dinosaurs, opened at the Park.

March 2017 brought the announcement of further investment in the form of a new HUSS Frisbee ride, which was purchased and transported from the defunct Pleasure Island park in Cleethorpes, Lincolnshire after it closed, where it was formerly known as Pendulus. It was renamed as Sky-Force to fit in with the current Sky High thrill rides promotion. The ride took the former place of the Ladybird Coin Operated Boats, Coin Operated Trucks and Kids pirate-themed play area and climbing frame.

The winter of 2017-2018 saw an improvement in facilities and a major redecoration, which led to a much cleaner and brighter feel for the 2018 season.

The 2018-2019 winter closure, saw minor renovations around the park, including the redecoration of some of the indoor exhibits. It also saw the addition of a coin-operated, 'Faulty Repair Shop' shooting gallery, manufactured by Pan Amusements. The unit is located next to the entrance of the indoor attractions. Access to the Avro Shackleton cockpit was also removed over radiation fears.

The winter of 2019-2020 saw minor improvements around the park. These included the removal of trees around the Hornet Coaster, a new canopy on the Carousel, and improvements to park and ride lighting.

Due to the COVID-19 pandemic, Flambards Theme Park was closed for a brief period of time in early 2020. The site was reopened in July of the same year after government guidance was changed.

The park was forced to close for a brief period, at the beginning of the 2021 season, fully reopening in May. A new ride was announced prior to opening, 'The Western Mine Train’, and officially opened on 26 May 2021. Other work that took place over the 2020-2021 winter season included the demolition of the Indoor Stage and 'Kingsford Hale' Bar. This has now been replaced with an outdoor seating area. The Victorian village had a partial replacement of lighting, with the introduction of LED bulbs in certain areas. Minor repairs have been made in 'Britain in the Blitz,’ further improving the exhibition. The outdoor play area has also had a completely new set of play equipment.

The 2021-2022 winter closure saw lots of redecoration around the park, including areas that had not been touched for several years. The Village cafe was completely revamped, with new seating, and a repaint. The Science Exploratorium was demolished, and replaced with an outdoor seating area. Additionally, the former Remote Controlled Pirate Ship area has been demolished and reverted to a pond. Trees around 'Ferdi's Funland' have been removed, and the Miniature Pirate Ship in this area has been replaced with a Miniature Carousel.

Between the 2022, and 2023 seasons, the 'Balloon Race' ride was replaced with the newer 'Samba Balloons' ride, which is aimed at a slightly younger audience. 'Ferdi's Indoor Play' (previously known as One2Eleven – a separate attraction) was combined with the park admission, to allow younger visitors to stay and play inside, while the older visitors ride. The 'Space Race' ride was removed, along with the smaller indoor play area, 'Cool Zone'. Various landscaping tasks also took place over the winter closure, including filling in the former 'Remote Control Pirate Ships' pond, to create a welcoming garden space, and the trees surrounding the 'Cyclecopters' and 'Ferdi's Indoor Play' were removed.

Early in 2024, Flambards Theme Park announced the arrival of a new ride, 'ThunderDome', a waltzer ride. This was opened at the start of the park's 2024 season. In addition to this, the indoor exhibits received a spruce up, and a new display cabinet, featuring Gus Honeybun was installed. The 'Space Orbiters' were also retired.

On 3 June 2024, Flambards Theme Park announced that several of its thrill rides, were out of operation. 5 June 2024, saw the official announcement from Flambards, that 4 of its thrill rides had permanently closed, and would be leaving the park during an additional closure period during June 2024. This meant that 'The Thunderbolt', 'Sky Swinger', 'Sky Force', and 'Hornet Coaster' would be removed from the park ahead of reopening in July. In light of this, Flambards significantly dropped the entry price, and added 2 new rides for the 2024 season, Flying Planes, and a set of Dodgems. During the additional closure period, 2 of the closed rides, 'Thunderbolt' and 'Sky Swinger' were removed from the park, and a general spruce up took place. This included painting and decorating, new signage for the indoor exhibits, and new park furniture.

In an unexpected move, Flambards Theme Park announced on 22 August 2024, that they had been working hard behind the scenes to overcome a supply issue, and by successfully replacing the main motor, Sky Force had returned to operation. As of 8 September 2024, The Hornet Coaster remained on site, but out of operation, and the other 2 rides closed in June had been removed. Sky Force was back in operation.

On Monday 4 November 2024, Flambards Theme Park officially announced it was immediately and permanently closing after 48 year of operations. Local MP Andrew George commented that the closure was "awful news" and that he had been assured that redundancies would be kept to a minimum. In mid November 2024, many of the rides were put up for sale through Martin Mejer Used Amusement Sales.

Ferdi's Indoor Funland, the indoor play area, reopened as a standalone attraction on 17 November 2024. It now operates as the sole remaining attraction on the site.

== Dispersal ==
In December 2024, a family who had donated a wartime nurse's uniform for display at the theme park requested its return after the park permanently closed. Flambards indicated a willingness to return family heirlooms but raised concerns about "opening the floodgates" to additional claims. In a BBC Radio Cornwall interview, Ian Cunningham, CEO of Livingstone Leisure—the company behind Flambards—provided updates on the future of the closed park. He emphasized their commitment to keeping the Victorian Village and Indoor Displays collection together, stating that all options were being explored to ensure their preservation, though he acknowledged that this task would become more challenging over time. Regarding the rest of the park, Cunningham shared that most of the rides had been sold, and no decisions had yet been made about the future of the brownfield site.

Lay's Auctioneers of Penzance announced 'The Flambards Sale' in February 2025, a three day auction to sell off Flambards Theme Park's assets. Lay's stated that they had been on-site since December 2024, cataloguing the thousands of extraordinary items that were to be sold. The complete catalogue was unveiled on 21 February 2025, including most of the items from the indoor exhibitions, such as the Victorian Village, Britain in the Blitz, War Gallery, and Aviation Gallery, along with catering equipment and various general items from around the park.

The announcement of the auction led to numerous attempts by various parties to save the collection. On 13 March, Lay's revealed that the Victorian Village had been sold in its entirety to Kynren, who plans to relocate and preserve the exhibition, transforming it "into a spectacular new show at the attraction set to open in 2026." Lay's auctioned the remaining 700 lots on 26 and 27 March 2025, which prominently featured the Britain in the Blitz Collection, the Concorde Experience, and the Shackleton Cockpit, amongst other items from around the park.

== Attractions ==
=== Final attractions ===
The main rides and attractions located at Flambards Theme Park prior to the permanent closure were as follows.

Attraction	Age range	Year opened	Opening time	Notes & Fate
Colorado Log Flume	Family	1990s	10:00	Made by Zamperla. Scrapped.
Samba Balloons	Family	2023	10:00	Balloons spin around a centerpiece. Made by Zamperla. Sold to Marsh Farm.
Cyclocopters	Children/Family	1990s	10:00	Pedal powered monorail with cars themed as helicopters. Scrapped.
Thunderdome	Thrill	2024	10:00	A waltzer ride on loan from John Armitage. Returned to John Armitage at start of December 2024.
Rocking Tug	Family	2007	10:00	Made by Zamperla. Formerly owned by The American Adventure Theme Park. Fate unknown.
Carousel	Family	2007	10:00	Made by Chance Rides. Formerly owned by The American Adventure Theme Park. Sold to Marsh Farm.
Skyraker	Family/Thrill	2010	10:00	It is the tallest ride in the park, with views of the surrounding area. Manufactured by SBF Visa. Dismantled in December 2025 with its fate currently unknown.
Sky Force	Family/Thrill	2017	10:00	A HUSS Frisbee ride, originally located at Pleasure Island in Cleethorpes, Lincolnshire until its closure in 2016, where it was known as Pendulus. Failed to operate during the latter half of the 2023 season, due to a delay on parts. In June 2024, Flambards permanently retired the ride, however changed their decision in August 2024, and announced the ride's reopening. It was initially offered for sale with Martin Meijer after the park's closure, but it was later demolished and scrapped in August 2025.
Dodgems	Family	2024	10:00	Traditional dodgem on loan from Ryan Lowe. Returned to Ryan Lowe after the park's closure.
The Western Mine Train	Family	2022	10:00	A short train ride, through a Western Mining Town. Fate of the train unknown, Buildings sold at the Flambards auction.
Flying Planes	Family	2024	10:00	Suspended flying plane kiddie whip style attraction similar to a Race-O-Rama. Currently for sale with Evan Moran Jr.
Flambards Formula Circuit	Family	(New Fleet in 2017)	10:00	20 go karts (10 single and 10 double seaters) on a figure of 8 track. A pay for attraction. Fate unknown.
Demon Drop	Family	1990s	10:00	Cornwall's Tallest Drop Slide. Demolished in December 2025.
Mini Golf	Family	2018	10:00	Free to play Crazy Golf. Pre-Historic Landscape Themed. Golf Clubs sold at the Flambards auction.

=== Ferdi's Funland ===
An area at Flambards that was devoted to younger guests.

Attraction	Year opened	Notes / Fate
Human Cannonball	2000s	As you spin, control your height as you fly in 4-person capsules. Sold.
Mini Carousel	2022	A miniature version of the traditional carousel. Sold.
Teacups	2000s	A miniature version of a tea cups ride. Sold.
Dino Express	2000s	Travel through a Dinosaur Haven in Dinosaur-themed cars. Scrapped.
The Cornwall Eye	2000s	A miniature version of a classic Ferris wheel. Sold to Hove Lagoon Funland.

=== Jurassic Journey ===
Life-size dinosaurs include a 5-metre tall brachiosaurus, a T-Rex and a triceratops. There is also a "Dino-Nursery" including baby velociraptors and a "Dino-dig" – where children could unearth fossilised remains of a prehistoric boneyard. Following the closure of the park, several of the Dinosaurs were sold to The Trengilly Wartha Inn, in Constantine, Falmouth. The "Dino-dig" section was sold as part of the Flambards auction.

=== Indoor attractions ===
==== Victorian Village exhibition ====
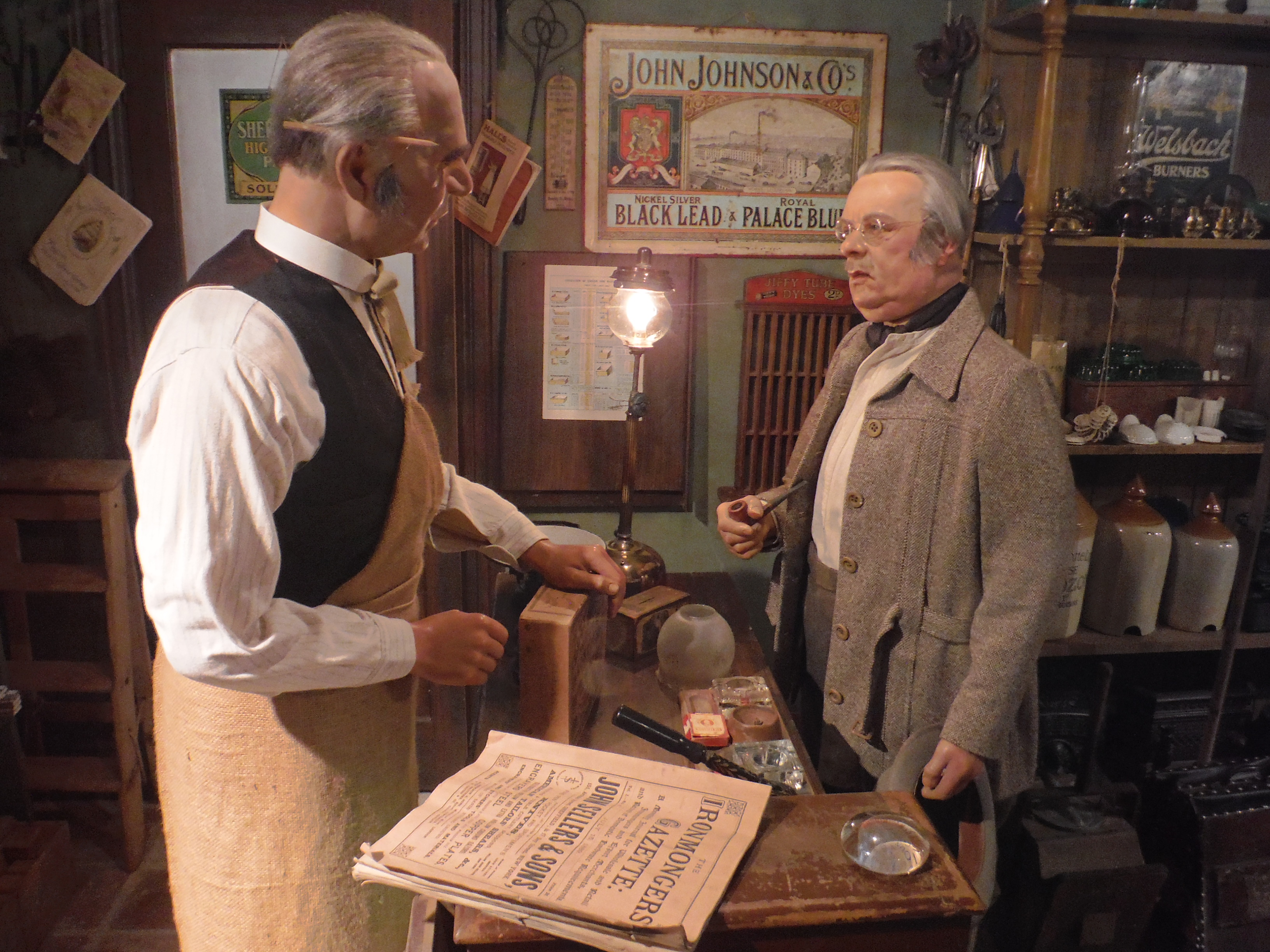
The Victorian Village

The Victorian Village was created of just three rooms in 1979 by Mrs. Audrey Kingsford – Hale who wanted to portray a life-size recreation of the fascinating Victorian period. Through the years the village has grown to some 50 shops, cottages and attendant trades including a butcher's shop, bakery, blacksmiths and sweet shop.

A time capsule was also available to view showing the history of William Whites Chemist Shop. William White's shop was discovered after being locked away and forgotten since 1909 in South Petherton, Somerset. The shop was sold at auction as 1 lot, and purchased over the phone, by Flambards' Founder, Douglas Kingsford Hale. Every item in the shop was numbered and charted so that when it was re-assembled at Flambards everything was exactly the same as the original.

Following the closure of Flambards Theme Park, the future of the Victorian Village was under threat of being split up and sold. The contents of the village were included in 'The Flambards Sale', a three day auction being held in March 2025 by Lay's Auctioneers. Just 2 weeks before the sale, Lay's revealed that the Victorian Village had been sold in its entirety to Kynren, who plans to relocate and preserve the exhibition, transforming it "into a spectacular new show at the attraction set to open in 2026."

==== The Britain in the Blitz Experience ====
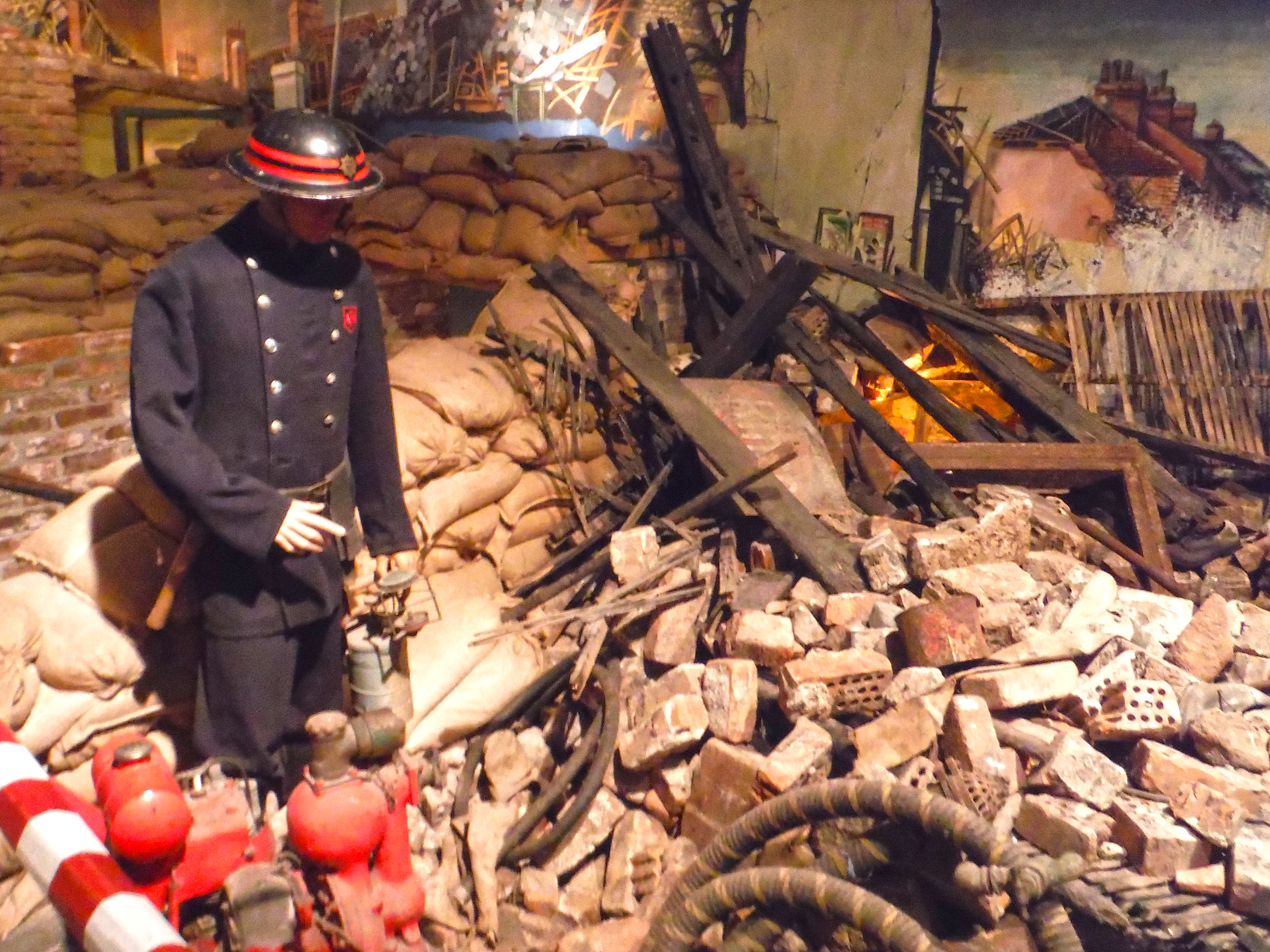
"Britain in the Blitz" display

The Britain in the Blitz exhibition was opened in 1984 by Dame Vera Lynn. The exhibition was a life size replica of a London street, blitzed during World War II.

The entire contents of the Britain in the Blitz exhibition were sold at 'The Flambards Sale' auction in March 2025.

==== Smaller exhibitions ====
- The War Gallery – The War Gallery was closely linked with the Britain in the Blitz exhibition, and is a tribute to all of the men and women of Great Britain and The Commonwealth who served in World Wars 1 and 2.
- Memory Lane – Charted a century of Wedding Gowns from Mid Victorian to the 1970s including a War Time dress made from a parachute. The stitch marks of the seams show that it was re-fitted and worn by several brides. The selection of photographs also charts weddings from the late Victorian period.
- The Aviation Experience – A Century of Pioneering Flight was an inter-active exhibition of some highlights in aviation history throughout the last Century. It features the achievements of:
  - Richard Pearse, the son of Cornish parents settled in New Zealand, claimed by some to have made the first sustained powered flight in 1902, a year ahead of the American Wright Brothers.
  - Charles Kingsford Smith, who in 1929 piloted the a flight between Australia and England.
  - The full-scale flight deck of Concorde, built by BAC for defining and confirming the ultimate positioning of the highly complex instrumentation, plus flight crew and passenger seating. Sold to private owner at the Flambards auction.
  - Cockpit fuselage of an Avro Shackleton. Sold to Aces High Aviation Gallery, at the Flambards Auction.
- Operation Sealion – an insight into the German intelligence gathering in preparation for the planned Nazi invasion of England in World War 2.

=== Family entertainment ===
==== Outdoor entertainment ====
- 'Faulty Repair Shop' Shooting Range (Coin Operated Shooting Gallery) - Relocated to Calloose Holiday Park.
- Coin Operated Crane Machines
- Outdoor Stage – Live entertainment stage. Sold to Camel Creek Park at the Flambards auction.
- Pirate Outdoor Play – Pirate Themed Outdoor Play Area Sold to Camel Creek Park at the Flambards auction.

==== Indoor entertainment ====
- Family Amusements – Coin Operated Games and Rides. Following the park's closure, these machines were returned to their owners, as they had only been leased to the park.
- Ferdi's Indoor Play – Formerly known as One2Eleven (Previously a separate admission to the main park) Ferdi's Indoor Play reopened as a standalone attraction on 17 November 2024. It now operates as the sole remaining attraction on the site.

=== Former attractions ===
- Extreme Force – a Ranger pendulum ride, built by UK manufacturer K.T. Enterprises. – Currently in storage. Operated between 2002, and 2013.
- Paddle boats – opened during the late 1980s and removed early 2000s.
- Dragon Ride – a Zamperla Rollercoaster located at the park between 1990, and 1994.
- Hype glide – a giant slide, manufactured by Harry Steer in 1980s. Scrapped in 2001.
- Space Mission – Três Eixos Caterpillar Coaster. Opened in 1991, and removed in early 2000s.
- Cornish Mine Train – a short electric train ride – opened 2008, and closed in 2012, following the construction of neighboring attraction, One2Eleven.
- War of the Worlds – a paintball game operating during the 2008 season.
- Gus Honeybun's underground burrow, and garden – replaced in Jurassic Journey in mid 2010s.
- Coin Operated Fork Lifts – Removed in early 2010s.
- Ladybird Boats – Toddler Self Drive, Coin Operated Boats. Removed in 2017, and replaced by Sky Force.
- Coin Operated Radio Controlled Trucks – Removed in 2017, and replaced by Sky Force.
- Pirate themed outdoor play area and climbing frame – Removed in 2017, and replaced by Sky Force.
- Indoor Stage, and 'Kingsford Hale' Bar – Demolished Winter 2020/21, and replaced with an outdoor seating area.
- The Pirate Ship – Miniature version located in 'Ferdi's Funland' – Replaced by Mini Carousel over Winter 2021/22.
- Science Exploratorium (Also known as Hands on Science) – Demolished 2021/22.
- Space Shuttle – Opened in 2008, after being relocated from the defunct American Adventure Theme Park, where it was known as Rascal Rocket from 2004 until 2006. - Children's Tower Ride, with joystick up and down operation on each seat. Ride closed in 2021/22, however the tower remained as decoration until the park's closure. It was sold as part of the Flambards auction for £200. Remains in the car park as of June 2025.
- Remote Controlled Pirate Ships – Removed 2021/22, pond retained as nature area. Pond filled in 2022/23 and now a maintained garden.
- Space Race – former fairground ride of the Super Bob style. Originally Superbob and located near the Exploratorium, later moved near the go kart track as Chariot Race and later moved into the former 3d cinema dome located indoors with strobe lighting effects – Removed 2022/23 but Green Enclosed Dome retained for future development.
- Balloon Race – a Zamperla Balloon Race – opened early 2000s and replaced by Samba Balloons in 2023.
- Cool Zone Indoor Play – Closed over winter of 2022/23.
- The Hornet Rollercoaster – Opened in 1995 – A Zierer Hornet style coaster. Permanent Closure announced in June 2024. Remained in situ for the remainder of the 2024 season, and was put up for sale with Martin Meijer. On 17 August 2025, a video on TikTok shows the Hornet has been demolished, along with Sky Force.
- Sky Swinger – Opened 2016 – A Chair-O-Plane ride, whizzing 13m above the park. Manufactured by Lamborghini Rides. Permanent closure announced in June 2024, and was removed from site before the summer opening in July 2024. Sold by Evan Moran Jr. to Wesley Gill, a UK showman.
- Thunderbolt – Opened in 2001 – Superrides International made Super Star ride (SS6) previously owned by Scott Manning as "Wild Thing". This ride was used in the millennium celebration on the Mall in London. Permanent closure announced in June 2024, having been sold to Evan Moran Jr. in 2024, to tour again. The ride was removed before the summer opening in July 2024. Evan gave the ride its debut as 'Reactor – The Institute of Power' at Normanton Gala on 13 September 2024.
- Space Orbiters (Coin Operated Bumper Cars) – Opened in the 1990s. Cars removed in 2024, although structure that housed them remained for the 2024 season.
- Coin Operated Ride on Vehicles – opened in the 2000s as 'Harley's Angels' with Coin Op Motorcycles, replaced in the 2020s with Tractors and removed for the 2024 season.

Opened, and Closed dates are unknown for the following attractions.

- SR2 Simulator
- Gravitron
- SuperCinema 3D
- Space Rangers
- AquaBuggies

== Food, drink and gifts ==
Flambards had three main eateries within the park.

- Village Cafe – Situated near the indoor attractions, serves coffee, lunches, and afternoon tea.
- Ferdi's Burger Bar – Fast Food Outlet, located near Ferdi's Funland.
- Ferdi's Indoor Play Cafe – Situated inside the indoor play centre, serves a variety of drinks and snacks.

There were also many takeaway kiosks located around the park. These serve a range of hot and cold drinks, snacks, and ice creams.

Flambards had two gift shops within the park.

- Past Times Gift Shop – Located near the entrance, sells a wide variety of memorabilia, and souvenirs.
- Humbugs Victorian Sweet Shop – Housed within the Exhibitions building, this Victorian themed shop sells a wide range of Sweets, and Vintages Gifts.

Ride Photography was available on the Colorado River Falls Log Flume, (and Hornet Coaster prior to its closure) with a range of gifts for sale featuring your ride photo.
