= Jonathan Ruffer =

British investor and philanthropist (born 1951)

- Born: Jonathan Garnier Ruffer; 17 August 1951 (age 75); London, England
- Education: Marlborough College; Sidney Sussex College, Cambridge
- Occupations: City investor, art collector
- Known for: Co-founder of Ruffer Investment Company
- Spouse: Jane Sequeira
- Children: 1 daughter

Jonathan Ruffer DL (born 17 August 1951) is a British City investor, art collector and philanthropist.

== Early life ==
Jonathan Ruffer was born on 17 August 1951 in London, England, to Major John Edward Maurice Ruffer (1912–2010) and Dorothy ("Dodo") Margaret Willan (1919–1998). Ruffer lived from an early age in Stokesley, North Yorkshire, England. He was educated at Aysgarth School and Marlborough College, a public school in Marlborough, Wiltshire. He graduated from Sidney Sussex College, a constituent college of the University of Cambridge, in 1972.

== Career ==
Ruffer started as a stockbroker, before becoming a barrister. He is now a Bencher of the Middle Temple. i.e. a senior member of the barristers' professional association. He worked in corporate finance for Schroders, an accepting house bank. He worked for Dunbar, a private bank, from 1980 to 1985. He was also on the board of directors of one of its subsidiaries, Dunbar Fund Management, from 1981 to 1985. He was then on the board of CFS (renamed Rathbone plc) from 1985 to 1994. He was on the board of Odey Asset Management, founded by Crispin Odey, from 1992 to 2005; Fuel Tech from 1994 to 1998; and Electric & General Investment Trust from 2001 to 2011.

In 1994, he co-founded Ruffer Investment Management Limited, an investment management firm with Robert Shirley, 14th Earl Ferrers (then Viscount Tamworth) and Jane Tufnell. The firm was renamed Ruffer LLP in 2004 and is now based at 80 Victoria Street in London. Ruffer was its chief executive officer from 1994 to 2012 and has been its chairman since 2011. The firm managed £15.4 billion on behalf of its clients in 2012–2013. In 2014, it had 199 employees, and additional offices in Edinburgh and Hong Kong.

He is a research fellow at St John's College, Durham. He has published articles in The Spectator.

== Philanthropy ==
Ruffer credits William Rathbone VI as a source of inspiration for his philanthropy. He believes nobody needs more than £20 million. However, he is critical of William Temple's Christian socialism.

He served as the chairman of the Good Shepherd Mission in Bethnal Green from 1998 to 2008. He has also supported the Church Urban Fund.

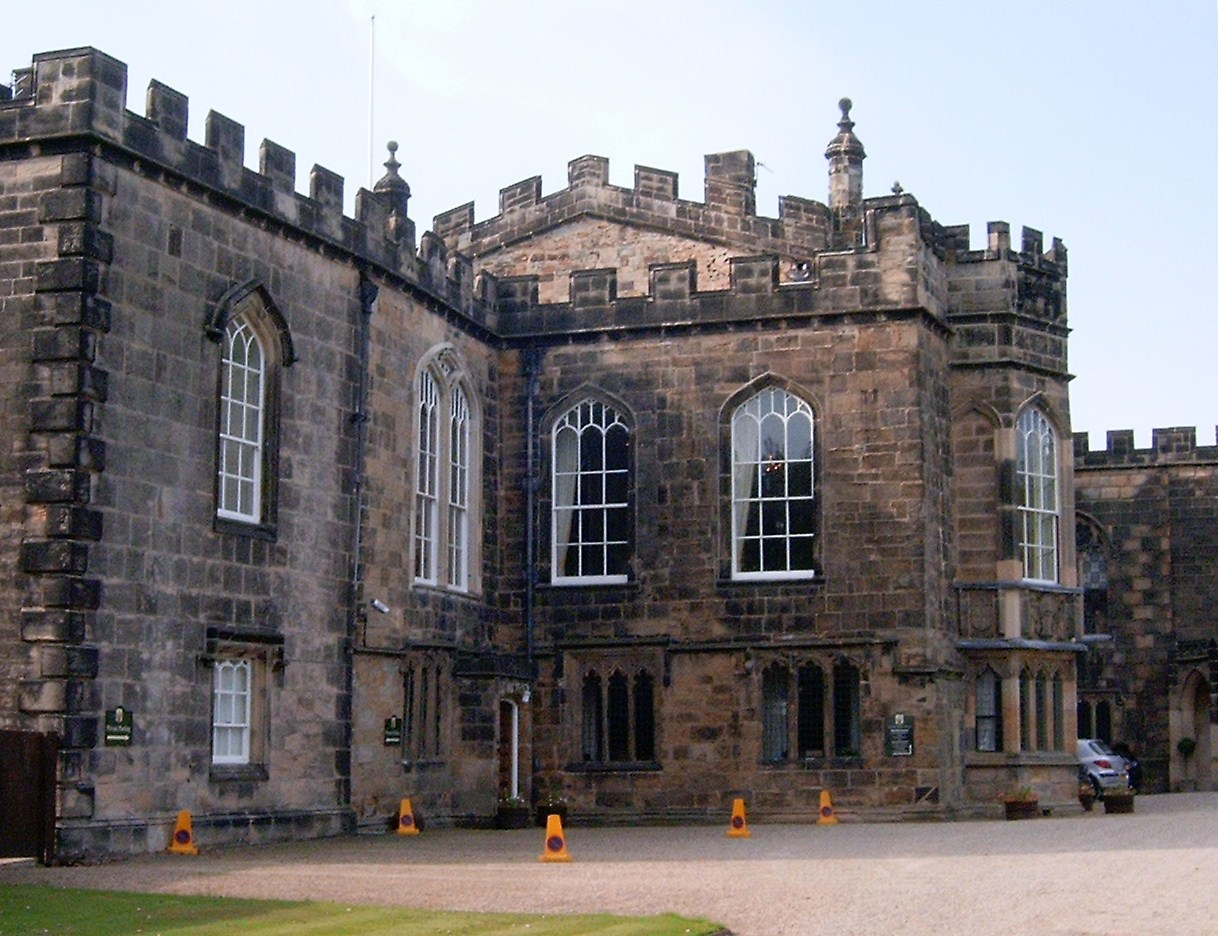
Auckland Castle in Bishop Auckland, County Durham.

He expressed an interest in reviving County Durham through philanthropy in 2012. That year, he donated £1 million to the Durham Foundation. A year later, he donated £15 million to preserve Auckland Castle, the historical palace of the Bishop of Durham, through the Auckland Castle Trust, of which he is the chair. This included the preservation of a series of huge paintings by Francisco de Zurbarán, Jacob and His Twelve Sons, which had been purchased by a previous bishop and had hung in the London Dining Room since 1756. In 2013, Ruffer donated £18 million to restore the Bishop's Palace and create a museum on the history of Christianity and faith in Britain Most of the palace became a visitor attraction, but the Scotland Wing still houses the offices of the Bishop of Durham.

The restoration project was completed in 2019 and the Castle was scheduled to re-open to visitors in November; three new restaurants for visitors were added, with one in operation by early November 2019. In 2019, he worked with Sotheby's James Macdonald (an expert on the Spanish school) to assemble a collection displayed at the Spanish Gallery.

In 2014, Ruffer donated the endowment to create Kynren, a night show telling the history of England, in nearby Bishop Auckland to aid in wider regeneration.

Ruffer purchased Auckland Castle to save the collection of paintings by Zurbarán, that were going to be sold.

Ruffer has since opened: the Mining Art Gallery (to showcase local miners' work), the Northern Museum of Archaeological Importance, the Spanish Gallery, the Auckland Tower, the Auckland Project, the Auckland Castle, Kynren, the Deer Park, Eleven Arches, and most recently Weardale Railway which will provide a direct link from Killhope Lead Mining Museum to Bishop Auckland.

He has endowed the Jonathan Ruffer curatorial grants at The Art Fund, which give £75,000 to curators every year.

== Art collection ==
Ruffer collects Spanish old masters, which can be viewed in the Spanish Gallery in Bishop Auckland. The Gallery contains works by El Greco, Murillo, and Juan Bautista Maíno, among others. He also owns paintings by Thomas Gainsborough.

== Personal life ==
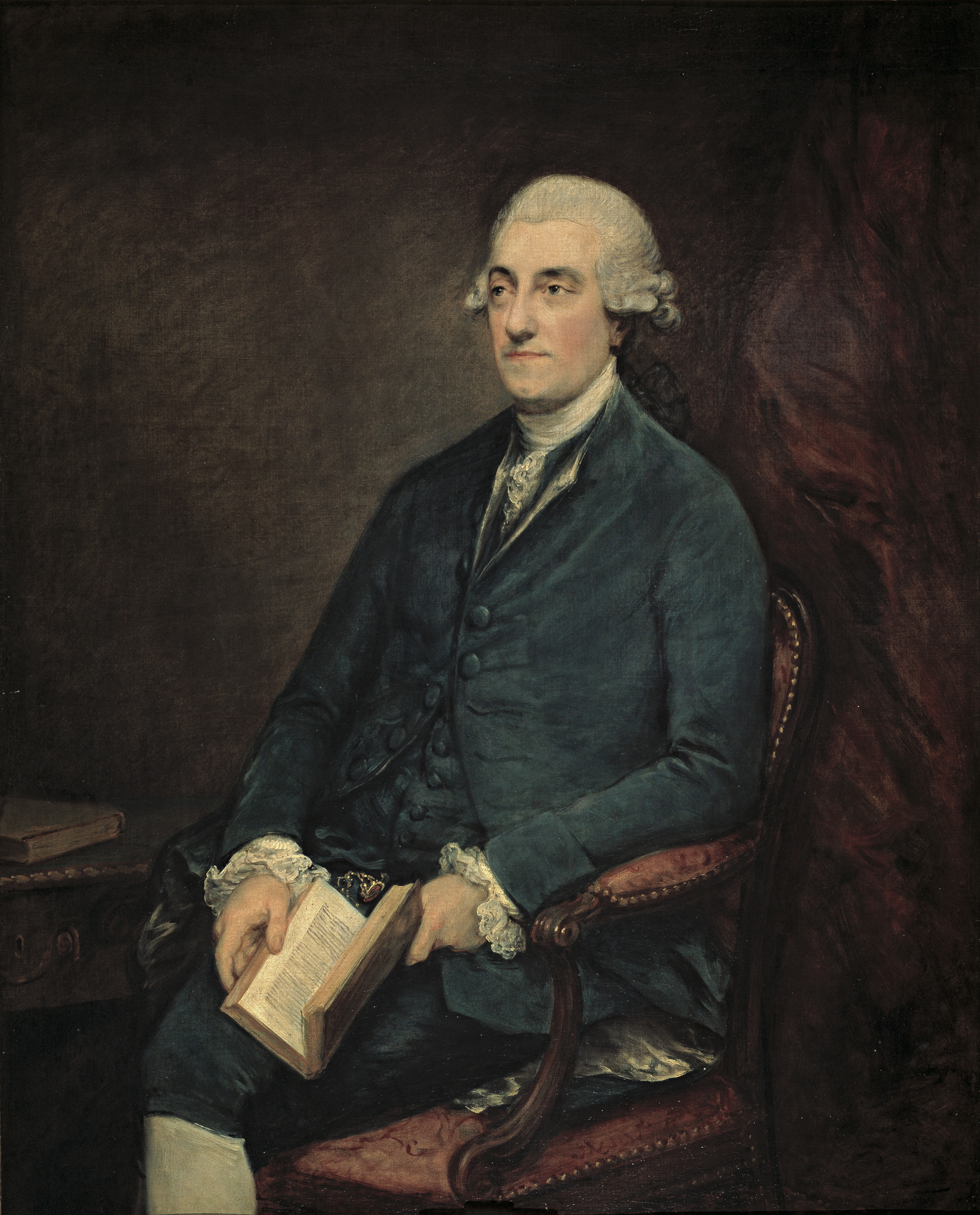
Isaac Henrique Sequeira, by Thomas Gainsborough. Museo del Prado, Madrid.

Ruffer is a great-grandson of Maurice Ruffer (1857–1935), a French-born British banker, whose father founded A Ruffer & Sons as a private company in the City of London.

Ruffer is married to Jane Sequeira, a doctor specialising in palliative care. She is a descendant of Isaac Henrique Sequeira (1738–1816), a Portuguese Jewish doctor, who was painted by Thomas Gainsborough, one of his patients; that oil painting now hangs in Madrid's Museo del Prado.

The couple have a daughter.

An Anglican, Ruffer has been described by the Financial Times as "a committed evangelical Christian" and by The Yorkshire Post as "a devout Christian." He is a member of the Athenaeum Club and the Beefsteak Club.

As of 2014, he had an estimated wealth of £380 million. Following his substantial donations to the Auckland Project, as of 2020, Ruffer was worth £159 million. according to the Sunday Times Rich List. Ruffer gave an estimated £160 million to the development of Bishop Auckland in 2020. In 2025, The Daily Telegraph reported that he had given at least £200 million to the Auckland Project to develop the town.

== Bibliography ==
- The Big Shots (1977).
- Babel, the Breaking of the Banks (2009)
