= Securities Trust =

Holding company in Britain

The Securities Trust (SET) was a holding company established in 1924 jointly by the British Treasury and the Bank of England to dispose of certain government-owned assets. When the Disposal and Liquidation Commission was closed down that year, certain assets were transferred to SET:

Company	Holding
British Celanese Ltd	£500,000
A. Ruffer & Sons Ltd	£689,250
G.F. Neame & Co.	£68,500
Foy, Morgan & Co.	£128,689
Durant, Radford & Co.	£6,900
