= Healthcare International Research =

- Company type: Private company
- Industry: Healthcare
- Founded: 2019; 7 years ago
- Founder: Farard Darver
- Headquarters: Wimborne, England
- Website: healthcare-international-research.com

Healthcare International Research (HIR) is a healthcare company based in Wimborne, England. Established in 2019 and provides cannabidiol (CBD) products and operates in the UK, the EU, South Africa, Saudi Arabia, Brazil, India, and the US.

== Overview ==
Healthcare International Research was founded in 2019 by Farard Darver, a former British Army officer and commando, after experiencing chronic pain from injuries sustained during his service in Afghanistan. Darver figured out CBD, an oil found in marijuana that helped him manage the pain. The company offers CBD-infused products that focus on topical application rather than orally ingested CBD oils formulated by a scientifically based cannabinoid research company based in the Czech Republic, and sells two brands, HEMPE for health and wellness and MotherSage, for beauty and skincare.

As of November 2023, the company was valued at around £5 million and received investments from the British businessman Ian Prosser and Tim Youngman, the former Ruffer Investment Company director and partner.

== Awards and recognition ==
In 2023, HEMPE received the Tatler Beauty Award for the best for joints & muscles. In 2024, HIR was awarded the 2024 UK Enterprise Award in the Best Sustainable Muscle & Skin Care Line category. MotherSage received the 2024 Green Parent Natural Beauty Award in the Best Lip Balm category. In the same year, HEMPE was awarded the Global Excellence Award in the Best CBD Pain Relief Brand 2024 – UK category.
