= Isaac Henrique Sequeira =

Portuguese Sephardic Jewish doctor

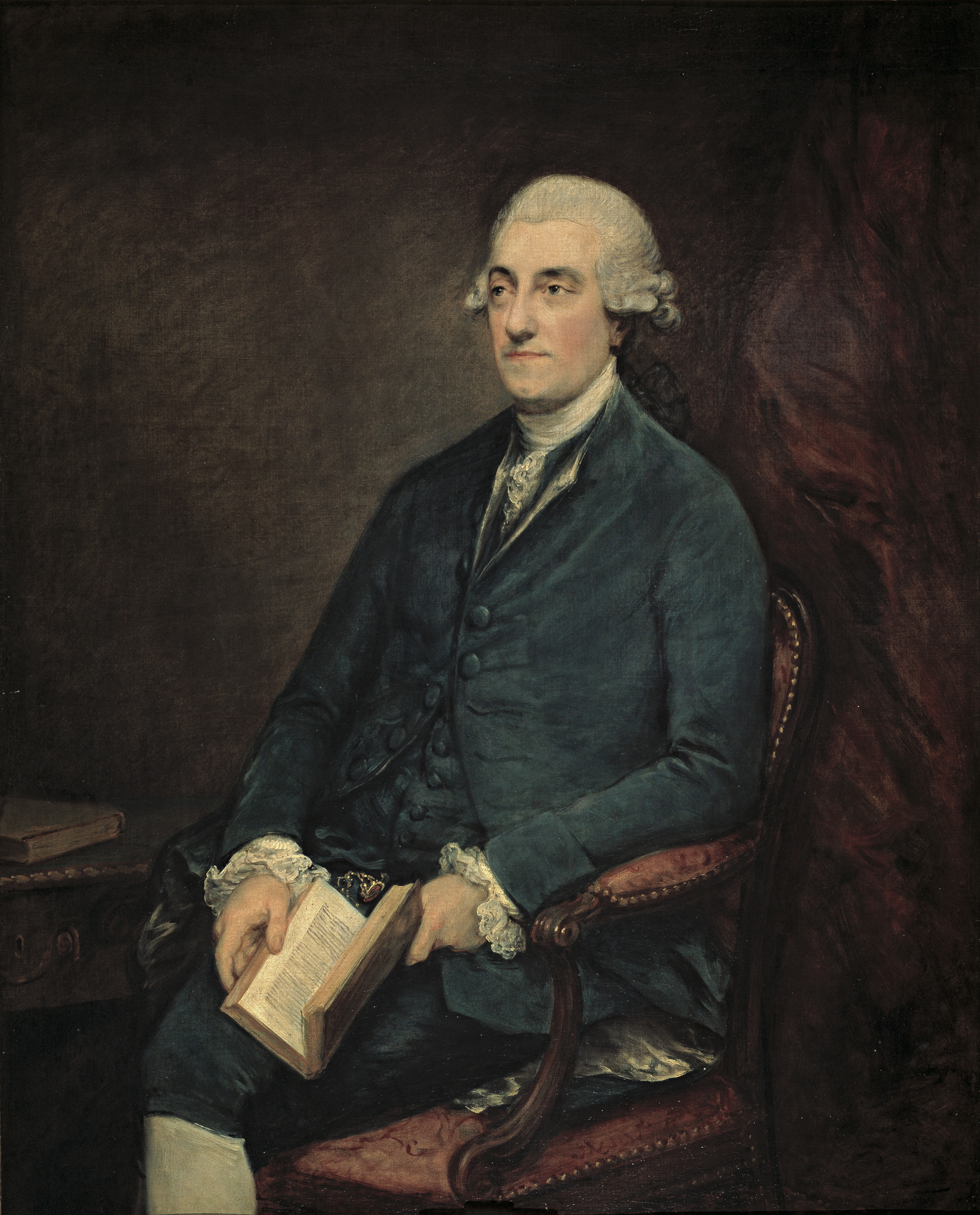
Isaac Henrique Sequeira, by Gainsborough

Isaac Henrique Sequeira (1738–1816) was a Portuguese Sephardic Jewish doctor, who lived and worked in London.

== Early life ==
Sequeira was born in Lisbon, and educated at Bordeaux and Leiden.

== Career ==
Sequeira served as physician extraordinary to the Portuguese Embassy at the Court of St James's in London, and honorary physician extraordinary to the Portuguese prince regent.

He was a licentiate of the Royal College of Physicians (LCP) and practised medicine in Mark Lane in the City of London.

Sequeira was painted in about 1775 by Thomas Gainsborough, one of his patients, and that oil painting now hangs in Madrid's Museo del Prado.

== Personal life ==
Sequeira married Esther d'Aguilar (1739-1791), the daughter of Baron Diego Pereira d'Aguilar. In Jews and Medicine: An Epic Saga, Frank Heynick describes him as "wealthy and pompous".

On 21 April 1814, his daughter Lydia died.

His descendants include Jane Sequeira, a British doctor married to the financier Jonathan Ruffer, who collects Spanish old masters and Gainsborough paintings.
