= Samuel George Shattock =

British pathologist (1852-1924)

Samuel George Shattock FRS (born Samuel George Betty, 3 November 1852, Camden Town – 11 May 1924) was a British pathologist.

After education at Prior Park College, Bath, S. G. Betty matriculated in 1867 at University College School and in 1868 at the University of London. In October 1868 he became a medical student at University College Hospital. There he won the Liston Gold Medal for 1875 (awarded at the end of the summer session to the pupil "who has most distinguished himself by reports and observations on the surgical cases in the hospital"). In 1876 under the supervision of Marcus Beck, he started a descriptive catalogue of the University College Hospital's preparations of surgical pathology.

In December 1881, Samuel George Betty was elected a Fellow of the Royal College of Surgeons, but he then changed his name to Samuel George Shattock, giving as a reason that the Shattock side of his family seemed likely to suffer extinction and the change might preserve the family name. S. G. Shattock worked on pathology and never registered as a medical practitioner.

In 1878 as the successor to Cossar Ewart, Shattock was appointed Curator of the Anatomical and Pathological Museum at University College Hospital. In 1884 he was appointed Curator of the Museum at St Thomas's Hospital, holding this post until his death in 1924. At St Thomas's Hospital he was appointed Lecturer on Pathology in the Medical School and later at the University of London, Professor of Pathology in the University of London, continuing in those two posts until he died in 1924.

Shattock taught surgical pathology using typical museum specimens and in 1895 he gave a pioneering course of practical demonstrations in bacteriology. In addition to his regular work, he was often called upon to give a definitive opinion on morbid specimens sent from various locations in the British Empire. He was a pioneer of palaeopathology. On 4 April 1905 he exhibited a prehistoric or predynastic urinary calculus found in Egypt by G. Elliot Smith. In 1909 as President of the Pathological Section of the Royal Society of Medicine, Shattock exhibited microscopic sections of the aorta of the mummy of the Pharaoh Merneptah. From 1910 to 1927 Shattock worked with C. F. Beadles on a comprehensive collection of pathological specimens illustrating the possibilities for disease.

Shattock married in 1882 and upon his death was survived by his wife, three sons, and a daughter. His second son was the prominent surgeon Clement Edward Shattock.

== Awards and honours ==
- 1893 – Morton Lecturer on Cancer
- 1909 – Hunterian Professor of Surgery and Pathology from 1909 to 1911 (lecture on "Certain Matters connected with Internal Secretion and with Fat")
- 1916 – Hon. Fellow of the Royal College of Physicians
- 1917 – F.R.S.

== Selected publications ==
=== Articles ===
- with Robert W. Parker: "Pathology and Etiology of Congenital Club-foot". Transactions of the Pathological Society of London. 35: 423. 1884.
- Shattock SG (1894). "The Morton Lecture on Cancer and Cancerous Diseases: Delivered before the Royal College of Surgeons of England". British Medical Journal. 1 (1742): 1065–7. doi:10.1136/bmj.1.1742.1065. PMC 2404972. PMID 20754814.
- Shattock, Samuel G. (1900). "Chromocyte clumping in acute pneumonia and certain other diseases, and the significance of the buffy coat in the shed blood". The Journal of Pathology and Bacteriology. 6 (3): 303–314. doi:10.1002/path.1700060303.
- Shattock SG (1909). "On normal tumour-like formations of fat in man and the lower animals". Proceedings of the Royal Society of Medicine. 2(Pathol Sect) (Pathol Sect): 207–270. doi:10.1177/003591570900201119. PMC 2046519. PMID 19973917.

=== Books ===
- with W. Wayne Babcck: An Atlas of the Bacteria Pathogenic in Man, with Descriptions of their Morphology and Modes of Microscopic Examination, with an Introductory Chapter on Bacteriology, etc., New York, 1899.
- A Prehistoric or Predynastic Egyptian Calculus. Adlard and Son. 1905; 290 pages
