= Paleopathology =

Scientific study of ancient diseases and injuries

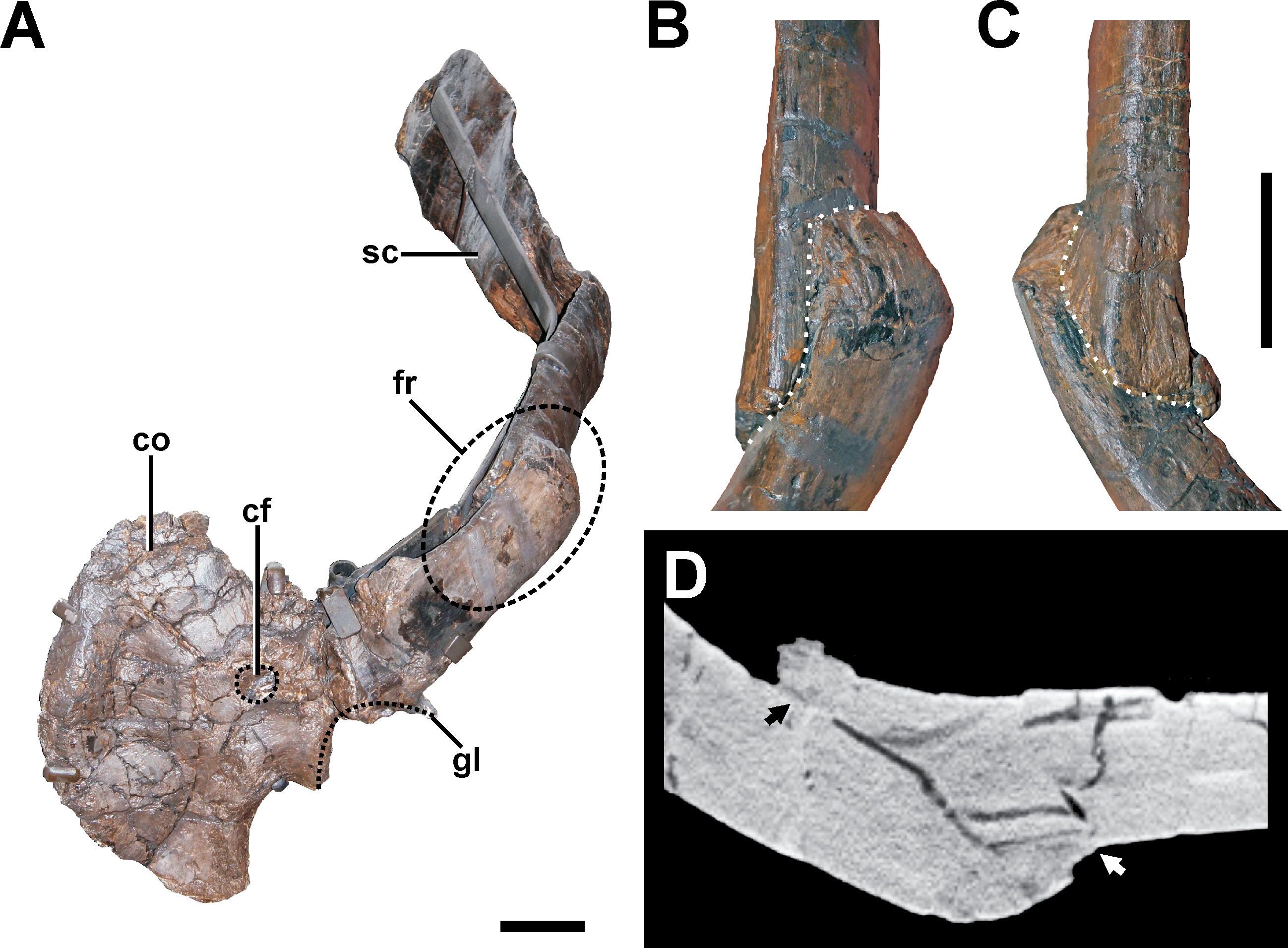
Fractured Allosaurus scapula

Paleopathology, also spelled palaeopathology, is the study of ancient diseases and injuries in organisms through the examination of fossils, mummified tissue, skeletal remains, and analysis of coprolites. Specific sources in the study of ancient human diseases may include early documents, illustrations from early books, painting and sculpture from the past. All these objects provide information on the evolution of diseases as well as how past civilizations treated conditions. Studies have historically focused on humans, although there is no evidence that humans are more prone to pathologies than any other animal.

The word paleopathology is derived from the Ancient Greek roots of palaios (παλαιός) meaning "old", pathos (πάθος) meaning "experience" or "suffering", and -logia (-λογία), "study".

Paleopathology is an interdisciplinary science, meaning it involves knowledge from many sectors including (but not limited to) "clinical pathology, human osteology, epidemiology, social anthropology, and archaeology". It is unlikely that one person can be fluent in all necessary sciences. Therefore, those trained in each are important and make up a collective study. Training in anthropology and archaeology is arguably most important, because the analysis of human remains and ancient artifacts are paramount to the discovery of early disease.

== History ==
Historical evidence shows that deviations from good health have long been an interest to humans. Although the content that makes up this study can be traced through ancient texts, the term "paleopathology" did not have much traction until the 20th century. This time period saw an increase in case studies and "published reports on ancient diseases". Ancient texts that are thousands of years old record instances of diseases such as leprosy.

From the Renaissance to the mid-nineteenth century, there was increasing reference to ancient disease, initially within prehistoric animals although later the importance of studying the antiquity of human disease began to be emphasized. Some historians and anthropologists theorize that "Johann Friederich Esper, a German naturalist...heralds the birth of paleopathology." Although it wasn't until between the mid nineteenth century and World War I that the field of human paleopathology is generally considered to have come about. During this period, a number of pioneering physicians and anthropologists, such as Marc Armand Ruffer, G. Elliot Smith, Frederic Wood Jones, Douglas E. Derry, and Samuel George Shattock, clarified the medical nature of ancient skeletal pathologies. This work was consolidated between the world wars with methods such as radiology, histology and serology being applied more frequently, improving diagnosis and accuracy with the introduction of statistical analysis. It was at this point that paleopathology can truly be considered to have become a scientific discipline. Today, the use of biomedical technology like DNA and isotopic analysis are major developments for pathological knowledge.

After World War II paleopathology began to be viewed in a different way: as an important tool for the understanding of past populations, and it was at this stage that the discipline began to be related to epidemiology and demography.

New techniques in molecular biology also began to add new information to what was already known about ancient disease, as it became possible to retrieve DNA from samples that were centuries or millennia old.

== Methods and techniques ==
To analyze human remains of the past, different techniques are used depending on the type of remains that are found. For example, "the approach to palaeopathological samples depends on the nature of the sample itself (e.g. bone, soft tissue or hair), its size (from minimal fragments to full bodies), the degree of preservation and, very importantly, the manipulation allowed (from intact sample ready for display to absolute access and freedom to undertake any kind of valuable destructive analysis including a full autopsy study)." Much research done by archaeologists and paleopathologists is on bones. The basic nature of bones allows them to not degrade over time like other human remains would, making osteopathology important in studying ancient disease. Human osteopathology is classified into several general groups:

- Arthropathy
- Infection
- Oral pathology
- Trauma
- Tumor

Whilst traumatic injuries such as broken and malformed bones can be easy to spot, evidence of other conditions, for example infectious diseases such as tuberculosis and syphilis, can also be found in bones. Arthropathies, that is joint diseases such as osteoarthritis and gout, are also not uncommon.

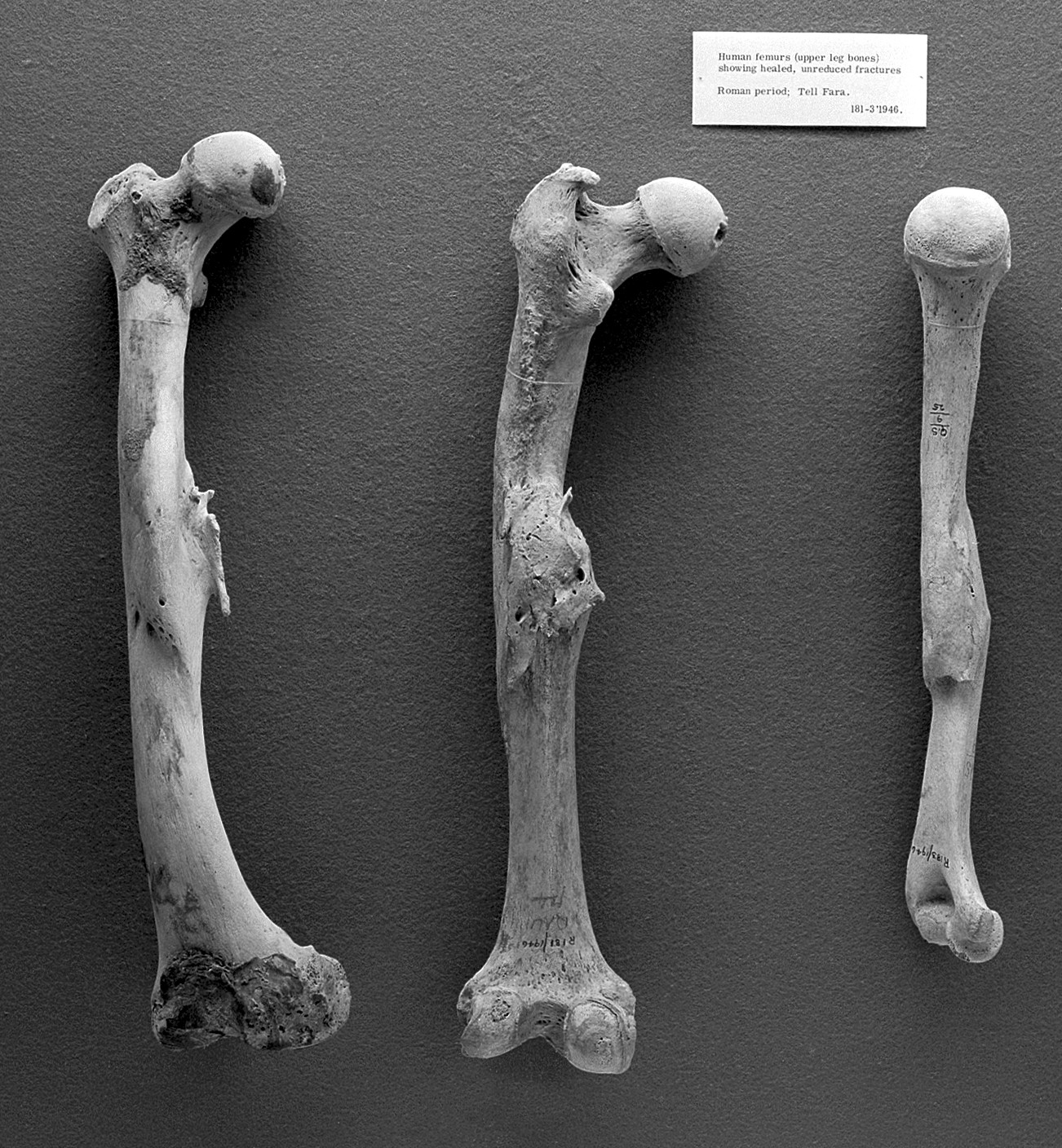
Human femurs and humerus (right) from Roman Period

The first exhaustive reference of human paleopathology evidence in skeletal tissue was published in 1976 by Ortner & Putschar. In identifying pathologies, physical anthropologists rely heavily on good archaeological documentation regarding location, age of site and other environmental factors. These provide the foundation on which further analysis is built and are required for accurate populations studies. From there, the paleopathology researcher determines a number of key biological indicators on the specimen including age and sex. These provide a foundation for further analysis of bone material and evaluation of lesions or other anomalies identified.

Archaeologists increasingly use paleopathology as an important main tool for understanding the lives of ancient peoples. For example, cranial deformation is evident in the skulls of the Maya, where a straight line between nose and forehead may have been preferred over an angle or slope. There is also evidence for trepanation, or drilling holes in the cranium, either singly or several times in a single individual. Partially or completely healed trepanations indicate that this procedure was often survived. The 10,000 year-old human remains discovered at the site of Nataruk in Turkana, Kenya, reportedly show extreme traumatic lesions to the head, neck, ribs, knees and hands, including embedded stone projectiles, and they may represent the earliest evidence of inter-group conflict between hunter-gatherers in the past.

== Trauma analysis in paleopathology ==
Few diseases leave evidence on skeletal remains, however, osteological analysis of remains has the benefit of being able to describe and diagnose skeletal remains without the presence of soft tissue. Paleopathologies are divided into seven suggested categories for analysis:

- Anomalies
- Trauma repair
- Inflammatory/Immune
- Circulatory
- Metabolic
- Neuromechanical
- Cancers

=== Skeletal trauma ===
Skeletal analysis of one of these main categories, trauma repair, is broken down further by into the types of trauma present:

- Partial or complete break
- Abnormal displacement or dislocation
- Disruption of blood supply
- Artificially induced abnormal shape or contouring

All these different types of trauma may be the result of accident, interpersonal violence, cultural practice or therapeutic treatment.

Fractures are the result of enough force being applied to bone to mechanically alter it. Tension, compression, torsion, and bending or shearing each leave its own characteristics on skeletal remains. The type, severity, number, timing and location of fractures are important for delineating between accidental and violent trauma and the data recovered from analysis reveal the meaning of that violence. Fractures present substantial problems for the skeletal areas located around the point of initial trauma and may leave accompanying secondary pathological evidence due to tissue death, deformity, and arthritis.

Types of trauma encountered during analysis might include blunt force trauma (BFT), sharp force trauma (SFT), projectile, heat, and chemical. Evidence of trauma in skeletal remains can vary depending on the type of bone affected; for example, blunt force trauma from a club will present differently than sharp force trauma inflicted by a sword.

During analysis, evidence of antemortem (before death) healing of a fracture allows it to be compared with both perimortem (around time of death) and postmortem (after death) trauma. Antemortem healing will present as a callus at the location of the fracture. As White notes, “The rate of fracture repair depends on alignment, amount of movement at the site of fracture and the health, age, diet, and blood supply of the individual.”

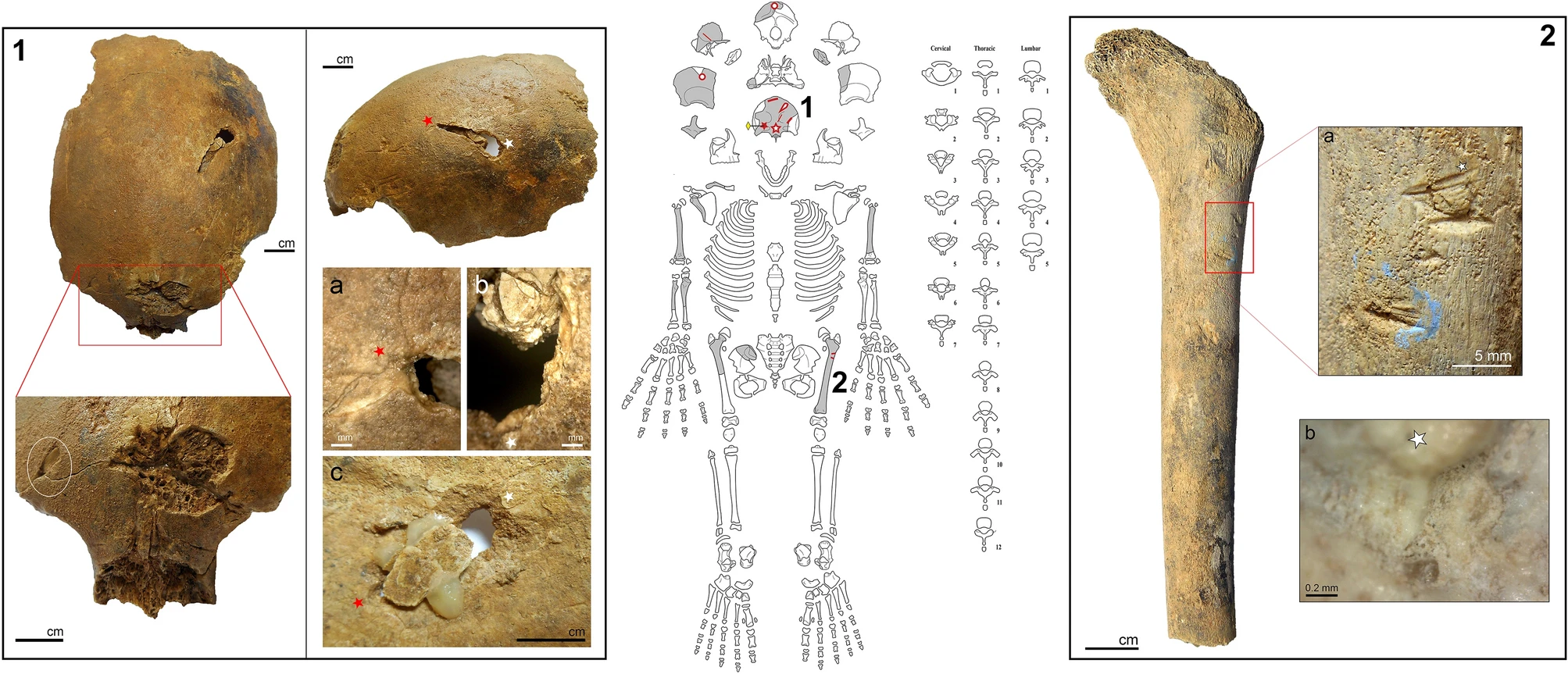
Evidence of skeletal trauma from violence

=== Violence ===
Differentiating skeletal trauma as the result of violence compared to that caused by accidental or other causes is achieved by integrating the skeletal analysis of mechanical injury to bone with the sociocultural context. Intertwining the biological analysis with the sociocultural factors presented by not just the individual but also the larger group context has allowed bioarchaeology to identify numerous types of violence including, as The Routledge Handbook of Paleopathology notes,“warfare, ritualized combat, hand to hand fighting, raids and ransacking, massacres, torture, executions, witchcraft, captive taking, slavery, anthropophagy, intimate partner and child abuse, scalping and human sacrifice." Without this synthesis of the biological analysis and social theory, Klaus notes that trauma studies are reduced to “simply descriptions of trauma found on bone.”

== Archaeological infectious diseases ==
Several diseases are present in the archaeological record. Through archaeological evaluation these diseases can be identified and sometimes can explain the cause of death for certain individuals. Aside from looking at sex, age, etc. of a skeleton, a paleopathologist may analyze the condition of the bones to determine what sort of diseases the individual may have had. The goal of a forensic anthropologist looking at the paleopathology of certain diseases is to determine if the disease they are researching are still present over time, with the occurrence of certain events, or if this disease still exists today and why this disease may not exist today. Diseases identifiable from changes in bone include:

- Tuberculosis
- Leprosy
- Syphilis

Apart from bones, molecular biology has also been used as a tool of paleopathology over the last few decades, as DNA can be recovered from human remains that are hundreds of years old. Since techniques such as PCR are highly sensitive to contamination, meticulous laboratory set-ups and protocols such as "suicide" PCR are necessary to ensure that false positive results from other materials in the laboratory do not occur.

For example, the long-held assumption that bubonic plague was the cause of the Justinian plague and the Black Death has been strongly supported by finding Yersinia pestis DNA in mass graves, whereas another proposed cause, anthrax, was not found.

=== Black Death ===
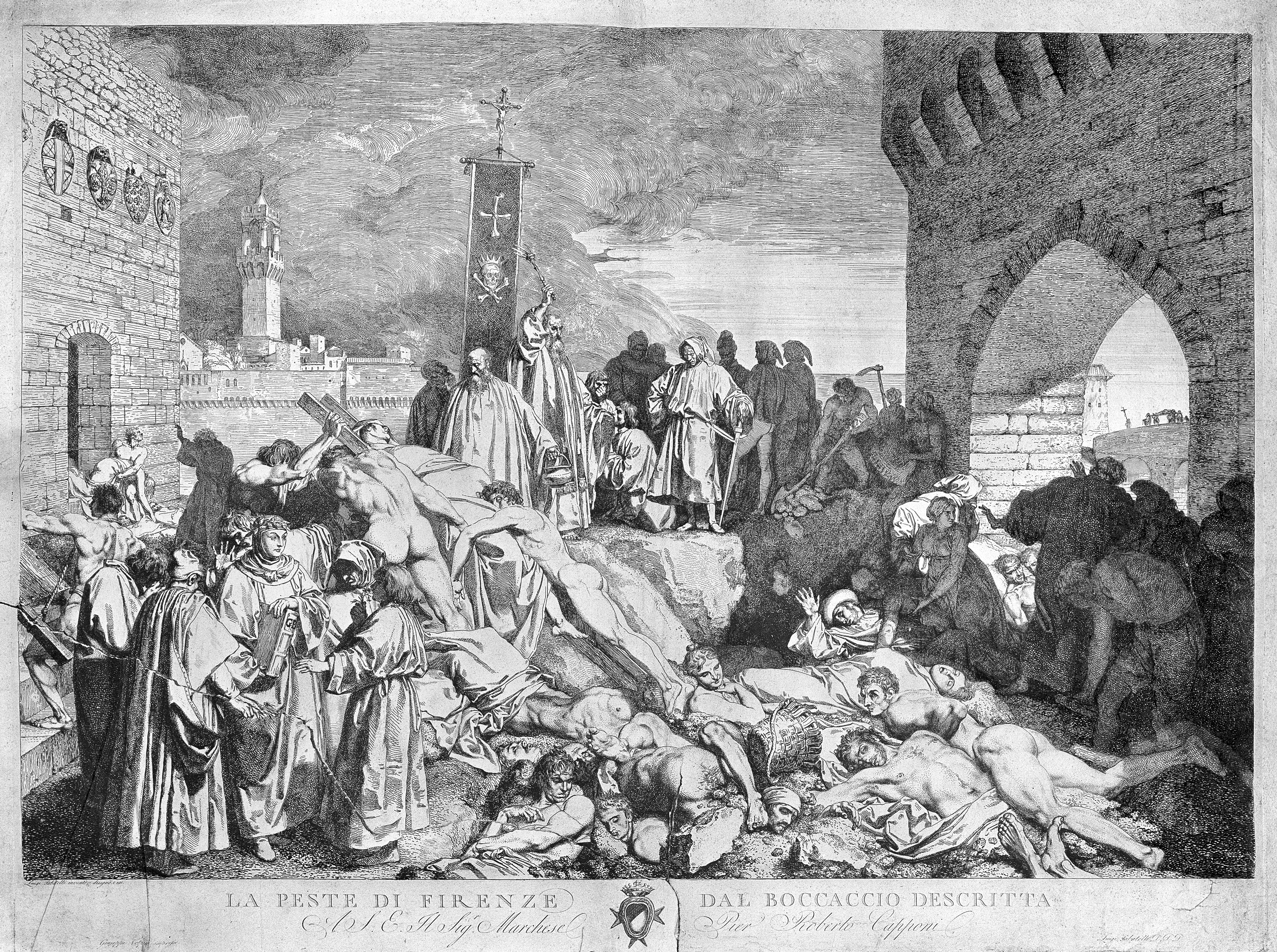
The Black Plague, Florence 1348

The Black Death pandemic occurred between 1347 and 1351. It is believed that the cause of the Black Death was bubonic plague, whose symptoms include swollen lymph nodes, fever, headache, fatigue, and muscle aches, and in some cases swellings from which blood and pus seeped. The Black Death originated in China and spread along trade routes and ports affecting many countries including North Africa and many European countries such as Italy, Spain, France, Germany, Switzerland, and Hungary. It is estimated that the Black Death killed up to 200 million people.

In 2013 an excavation at Thornton Abbey in North Lincolnshire uncovered a mass grave of 48 people, including 27 children. Radiocarbon dating and artifacts found in the mass grave showed that the bodies were from the time of the Black Death. The wide range of ages of the remains, from one to 45 years, led archaeologists to infer that something devastating most likely caused their deaths. Typically, mass graves contain remains from either the very young or the very old; this was not the case here. Because all ages were being buried here, archaeologists inferred that, although Thornton Abbey was adjacent to a small town, it was consumed by the plague to the extent in which a mass grave was needed. Until this discovery, known mass graves were very rare because small towns seemed to bury their dead in usual ways. It is believed that mass burials were used in Europe during this time because of the overwhelming number of deaths caused by the Black Plague.

Teeth samples from the remains revealed the presence of plague bacteria. These samples showed the presence of Y. pestis DNA, the bacterial cause of the plague. "Molecular identification by 'suicide PCR' of Yersinia pestis in the pulp tissue of teeth" and other forms of analysis on ancient DNA has become progressively more common with modern advancements.

=== Tuberculosis ===
Some diseases are difficult to evaluate in the archaeology, however, tuberculosis can be found and dates as far back as the Neolithic period. Tuberculosis is presumed to have been transmitted from domesticated cattle to humans through ingestion of contaminated meats and the drinking of contaminated milk. It is also possible to contract tuberculosis through contact with infected persons. When an infected person coughs, they eject infected mucus from their body which can possibly infect those close by. There are several types of tuberculosis: the kind that affects cold-blooded animals, the kind that affects birds, and the bovine type that causes disease in humans. Because bovine tuberculosis is often found in children, it may be that the disease is spread through the consumption of contaminated milk.

Tuberculosis manifests itself in the archaeological record through DNA extraction from the skeletal remains of people. Tuberculosis rarely manifests itself in the skeleton of individuals and when it does, it is usually only in advanced stages of the disease. The tuberculosis bacteria stays in the growth centers and spongy areas of the bone. Tuberculosis can lie dormant for long periods of time; because of the long period of development in the body, tuberculosis damages the body and then the body has time to repair itself. The evidence of the disease in bones can be seen in the destruction and healing of the bone structures especially in joints. Tuberculosis therefore appears in the archaeology record in the knee and hip joints and also the spine.

It was thought that there was no tuberculosis infection in North America before the arrival of Europeans, but findings from the 1980s and 1990s have overturned that idea. Through extraction of DNA within the bone tuberculosis was not only found, but also dated to have been present in the Americas since 800 BC. Tuberculosis is a disease that thrives in dense populations; the implication of finding tuberculosis in pre-Columbian society is that there was a large thriving community at the time. The earliest evidence of tuberculosis has been found in Italy dating to the 4th millennium BC. Evidence of tuberculosis has also been found in mummies from ancient Egypt dating to the same period. There is however, a lack of medical texts from ancient European and Mediterranean regions describing diseases that are identifiable as tuberculosis but the bones show that there was a disease of this type.

=== Syphilis ===
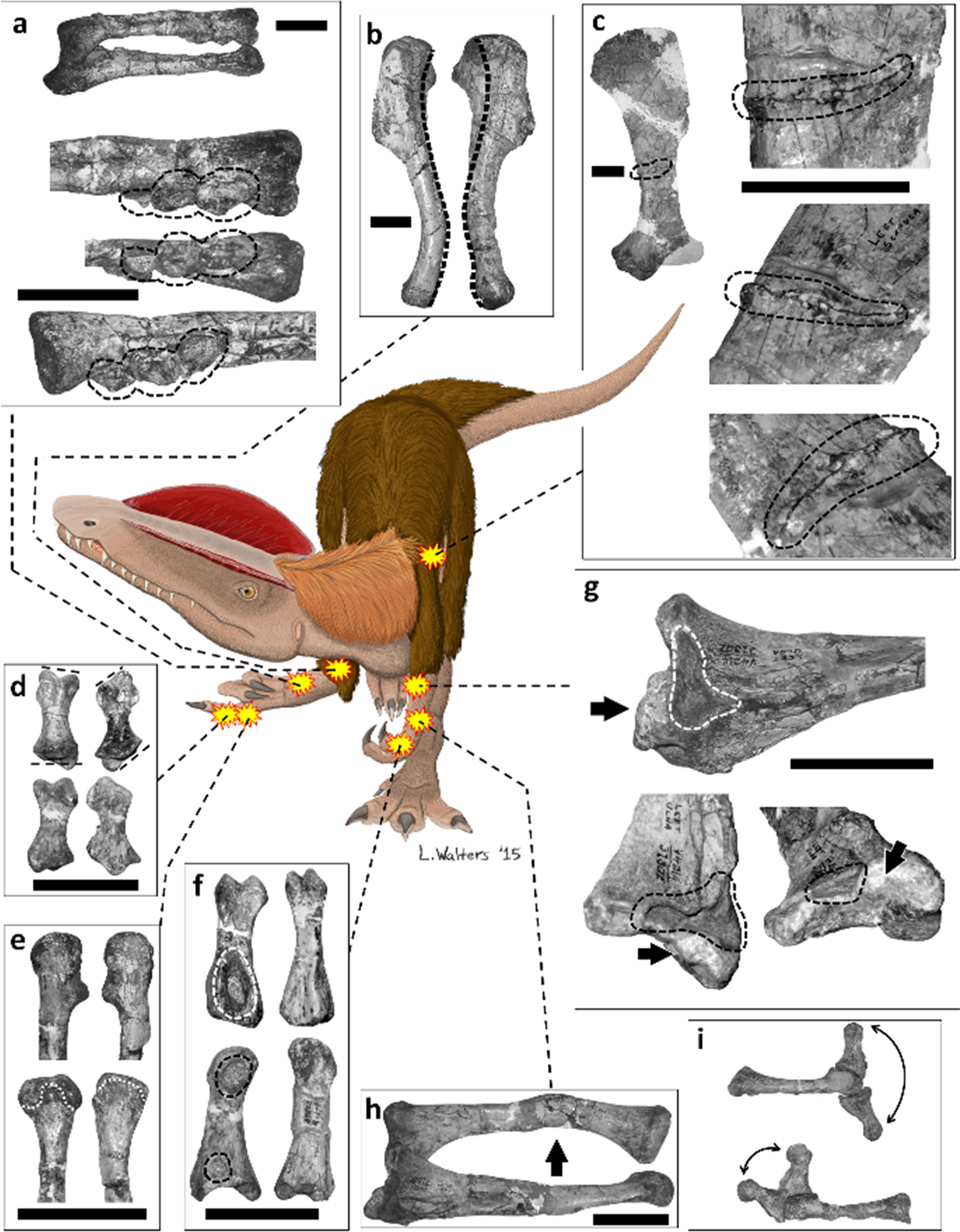
Paleopathologies in bones of a Dilophosaurus specimen, plotted onto a life restoration

Syphilis is a disease classified in a category of treponemal disease. This group includes diseases like pinta, yaws, endemic syphilis and venereal syphilis. These diseases have symptoms that include inflammatory changes in tissues throughout the body. Initially the infected person may notice an area of inflammation at the site where the bacteria entered the body. Then the individual can expect more widespread soft tissue changes and lastly the diseases start to affect the bones. However, Only 10-20 percent of people infected with venereal syphilis show bone changes. Venereal syphilis has more severe symptoms than the other types of treponemal disease. Nervous system and circulatory disruption are unique to venereal syphilis and are not seen in yaws, endemic syphilis or pinta.

Bone changes can be seen in the archaeological record through lesions on the surface on the bone. In venereal syphilis the bone change is characterized by damage to the knees and joints. The damaged joints could be the source of infection or they could be damaged because of disruption in the nervous systems and ability to feel. In the beginning stages of the disease, the bone forms small lesions on the skull and tibiae. These lesions are caused mostly by inflammation of the marrow. In the final stages of the disease the bones start to be destroyed. Lesions that are formed tend to look similar to "worm holes" in the bone and are seen in the skull as well as large bones in the body. Most of the bone that is destroyed is due to secondary infections.

Syphilis has been seen in the Americas and Europe alike but there is debate as to what the origin of the disease is. Columbus and his sailors were said to have brought it to the Americas, however, Europeans blame Columbus for bringing the disease to Europe. There has not been any evidence of bone lesions associated with the disease that Columbus and the Europeans describe. The debate on the origins of venereal syphilis has been the subject of scientific discussions for hundreds of years and has recently been discussed and debated. At the first International Congress on the Evolution and Paleoepidemiology the subject was examined and debated by scholars from all over the world. There was no conclusive decision made as to the origin of venereal syphilis.

== See also ==
- Egg paleopathology
- Retrospective diagnosis
- Paleopathology in Switzerland
