= Kynren =

Historical theme park in England

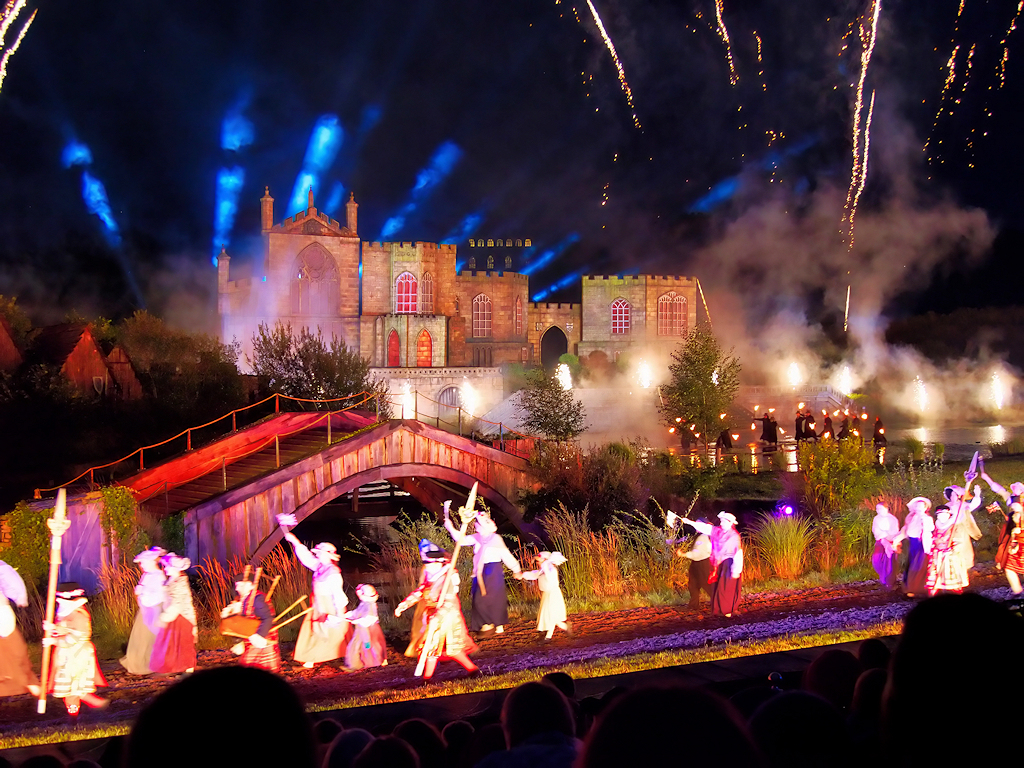
- Pictured in 2022
- Venue: Flatts Farm, Bishop Auckland
- Founded: 2016
- Capacity: 8,000 viewers
- Area: Bishop Auckland, County Durham, England
- CEO: Anna Warnecke
- Organizer: 11Arches
- Website: Official website
- 10

Kynren (/kɪnrɛn/) is a history-themed outdoor attraction in Bishop Auckland, County Durham, England. Its principal production, Kynren: An Epic Tale of England, is a live night-time show first staged in 2016 that depicts key moments from British history and legend spanning approximately 2,000 years.

The production is staged annually during the summer and is performed by a cast and crew of over 1,000 local volunteers. It is organised by the charitable organisation 11Arches, founded by multimillionaire philanthropist Jonathan Ruffer, as part of a wider programme of cultural regeneration aimed at establishing Bishop Auckland as an international tourist destination.

Following the success of the night show, Kynren: The Storied Lands, a daytime theme park, opened on the same site in summer 2026.

== History ==
Established in 2014, 11Arches (then Eleven Arches) began operating on 2 July 2016 when it presented the first season of Kynren: An Epic Tale of England, a sold out, open-air summer spectacular templated from the award-winning Cinéscénie produced by Puy du Fou in France. The project cost over £30 million, with the majority of funding provided by investment fund founder Jonathan Ruffer.

Due to the COVID-19 pandemic, Kynren's 2020 season was cancelled.

In 2021, 11Arches Park was opened to the public, featuring new equestrian stunt show Fina and The Golden Cape as the main attraction. Audience members saw a young woman named Fina fighting to defend her village, with pyrotechnics, horse stunts and advanced combat routines filling the show on the 7.5 acre stage. Organisers described the show as having “jousting, trick-riding, vaulting and chariot-racing” performed by highly trained stunt riders. The show featured the voices of actors Hugh Bonneville, Rory Kinnear, Ben Miller, Annabel Scholey and Katy Carmichael.

11Arches Park also featured the Maze Of Fame, live music, the Animal Croft, the Dancing Waters show, the Viking Village and a food court.

In 2022, 11Arches decided not to open the park and to allow for more to be added before reopening as a day attraction. Ticket sales for the night show were 24,476 in 2022 and 33,048 in 2023.

In February 2024, Anna Warnecke, previously Director of Cavalry at Kynren, became the new 11Arches CEO with Anne-Isabelle Daulon leaving the charity. 2024 also marked Kynren's best audience levels since opening in 2016, with over 44,000 tickets sold.

== Kynren: An Epic Tale of England ==
Kynren: An Epic Tale of England is a 90-minute open-air night-time performance that depicts 2,000 years of English history. The show follows Arthur, a fictional ten-year-old boy who travels back in time to witness pivotal moments in the history of the British Isles. These include the Roman conquest of Britain, King Arthur's search for the Holy Grail, and Winston Churchill's "Finest Hour" speech during the Second World War. The show places particular emphasis on the North East of England, and features recorded narration by actor Kevin Whately. It features up to 1,500 volunteer performers, accompanied by horses, sheep, geese and Durham Shorthorn cattle. Performed on summer weekends from July to September, the show's grandstand seats 8,000 spectators. The production sold 100,000 tickets in its first year.

The opening scene is inspired by a real event from the 1880s, when theology students playing football at Auckland Castle accidentally broke the window of the vicar, Reverend G. R. Eden. The incident ultimately led to the formation of Bishop Auckland Football Club, which has become one of the most successful amateur football clubs in history.

== Kynren: The Storied Lands ==
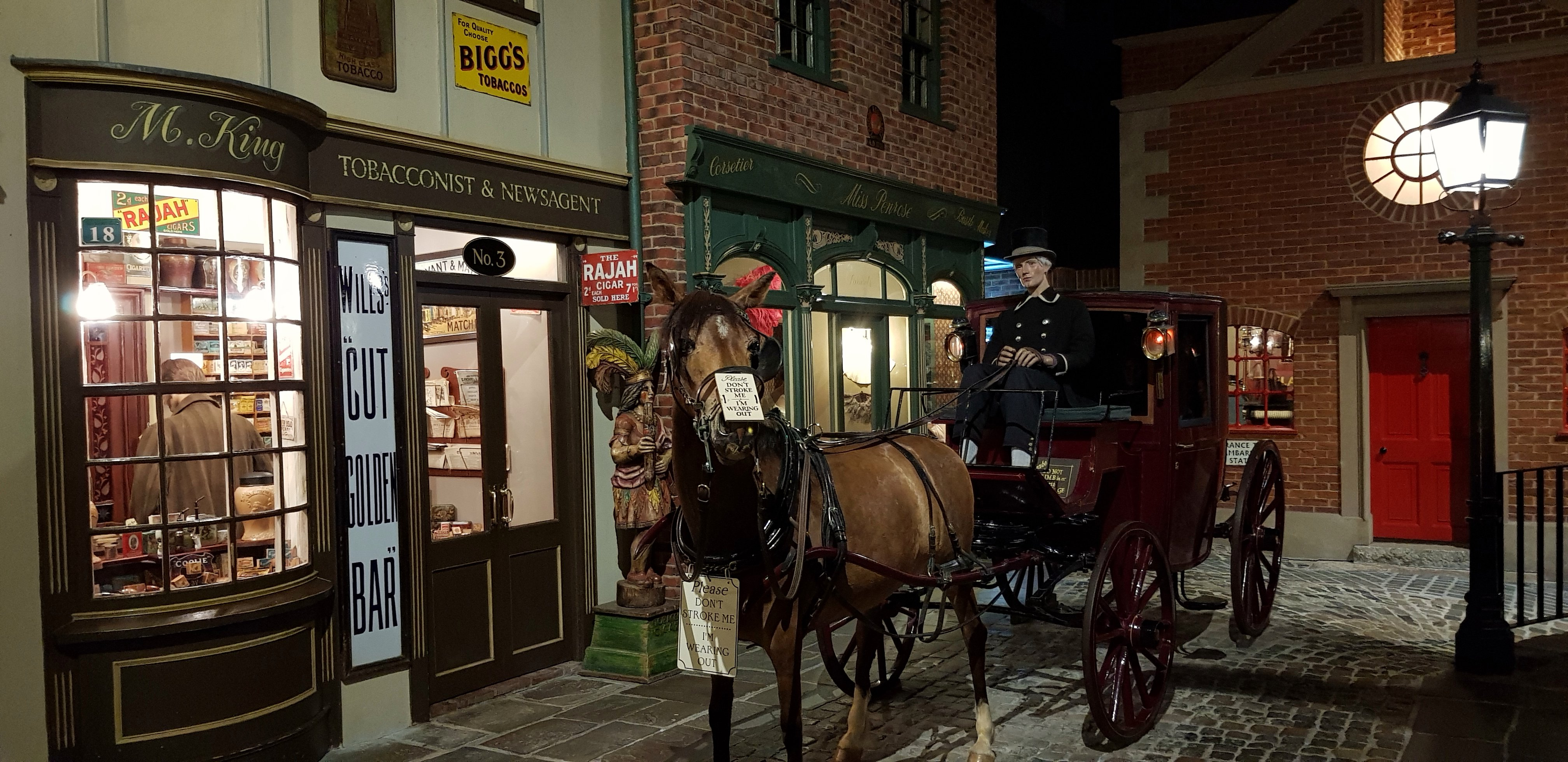
The Victorian Village as seen in 2021, to be relocated to The Storied Lands

Kynren: The Storied Lands is a daytime theme park scheduled to open in summer 2026. The operators expect to attract 3.3 million visitors in the first five years. At opening, the park is planned to feature five shows, each lasting approximately 25–30 minutes and staged multiple times per day:

- The Trusty Steed, a horse stunt show adapted from Fina and the Golden Cape
- The Legend of the Wear, a water-based stunt show based on the local legend of the Lambton Worm, featuring water effects, fight scenes, and stunts on a large lake
- The Lost Feather, a bird show featuring 300 birds, staged in a purpose-built 3,600-seat arena
- Land of the Vikings, a Viking-themed show
- A Victorian England-themed "walk-through experience", incorporating the Victorian Village from the former Flambards theme park in Cornwall

The operators plan to introduce additional shows in subsequent years, including performances based on the legends of Excalibur and Robin Hood. The Lone Centurion will depict Roman Britain, with an emphasis on Binchester Roman Fort and Hadrian’s Wall, while Conquest of the Seas will focus on Tudor England, including the naval career of Sir Francis Drake.

== Awards ==
Kynren, 11Arches, and the volunteers have won various awards including:

- Queen's Award for Voluntary Service (2018)
- Innovation in Tourism Award, Group Travel Awards (2018)
- Bronze award, Attitude is Everything, for accessibility to deaf and disabled people (2019)

== See also ==
- Auckland Castle
