= Balloon Race (ride) =

Carnival ride

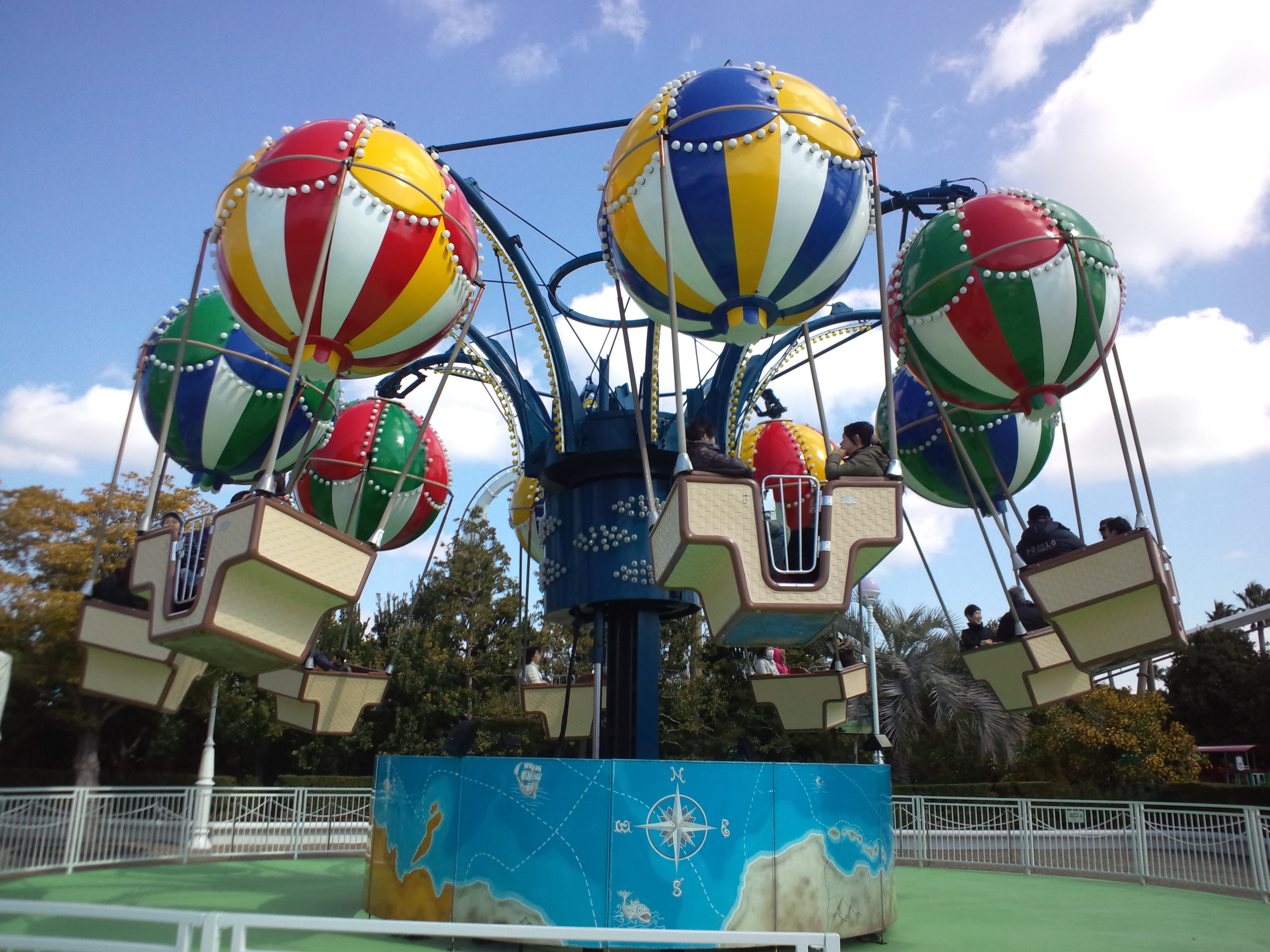
Globos Amigos at Parque Espana-Shima Spain Village (Japan), model Balloon Race

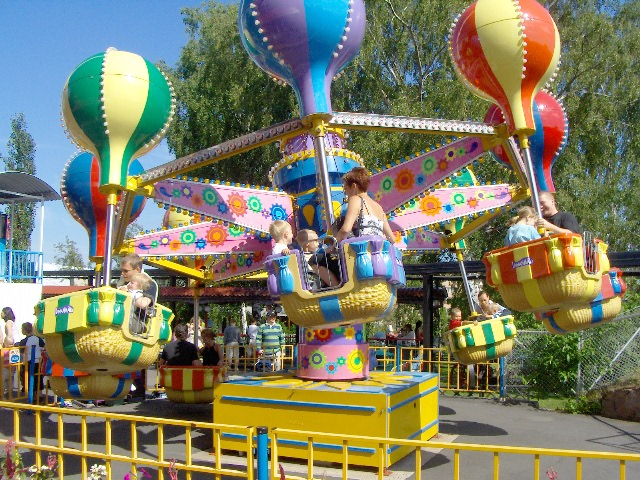
Model Samba balloon, a children's Samba Balloon ride.

The Zamperla Balloon Race is a tilting, circular motion amusement park ride manufactured by Antonio Zamperla S.p.A. The ride makes its way up a structure, and at a certain height, it starts tilting.

== Designs ==
=== Gondola designs ===
Twelve balloons with gondolas hold up to 4 passengers each. This ride also comes in 8 balloon and 12 balloon versions. There is also an essentially identical ride with pirate ships instead of balloons. Seat belts and locking doors provide safety. At some installations, a rider may exit themselves, while in other ones, an operator must let them out.

=== Similar designs ===
The Chance Morgan company manufacture a version of the Balloon Race, which is similar except the balloons are much bigger.

=== Samba Balloons ===
A smaller version of this ride called Samba Balloons is also in existence. The ride does a similar motion, but the 'balloons' can be spun by riders. This version of the ride is often found in areas of amusement parks, and at traveling carnivals.

== Some locations ==
Number of balloons or pirate ships is in parentheses.

- Balloons (8 Samba) - Storybook Land in Egg Harbor Township, NJ.
- Balloon Race (8) - The Flambards Experience Helston, Cornwall, UK (1991–2023)
- Balloon Race (12) - Flamingo Land Resort Malton, Yorkshire, UK.
- Balloon Race (8) - Idlewild and Soak Zone moved in 1995 from Kennywood where it lasted for four years.
- Balloon Race (8) - Knott's Berry Farm's Camp Snoopy in Buena Park, CA.
- Balloon Race (12) - Mega Parc Quebec City, Quebec, Canada (1988–2017)
- Balloon Race (8) - Santa's Village AZoosment Park East Dundee, IL (1992–present)
- Balloon Race (8) - Six Flags New England Agawam, MA.
- Balloon Race - Waldameer & Water World, Erie, PA
- Big Easy Balloons (12) - Six Flags Great America.
- Blowfish Balloon Race (8) - Tokyo DisneySea in Urayasu, Chiba Prefecture, Japan (2001–present)
- Flik's Flyers (8) - Disney California Adventure in Anaheim, CA (2002–2018)
- Flying Ace Balloon Race (was Boo Boo's Balloon Race) (8) - Carowinds
- Inside Out Emotional Whirlwind (8) - Disney California Adventure in Anaheim, CA (2019–present)
- The Pirate's Flight (12) - Geauga Lake in Ohio (themed to pirate ships instead of balloons.)
- Samba Balloons (8) - Victorian Gardens at Wollman Rink in Central Park, NYC.
- Samba Balloons (8) - The Flambards Experience Helston, Cornwall, UK. (2023–2024)
- Up, Up, and Away (10) - Enchanted Kingdom Santa Rosa, Laguna, Philippines (1995–present)
- Up, Up, and Away (8) - Six Flags Over Georgia. (2004–present)
- Weather Balloons (8 Samba) - Darien Lake Darien Center, NY. (1996–present)
