= Egg paleopathology =

Study of abnormalities in fossilized eggs

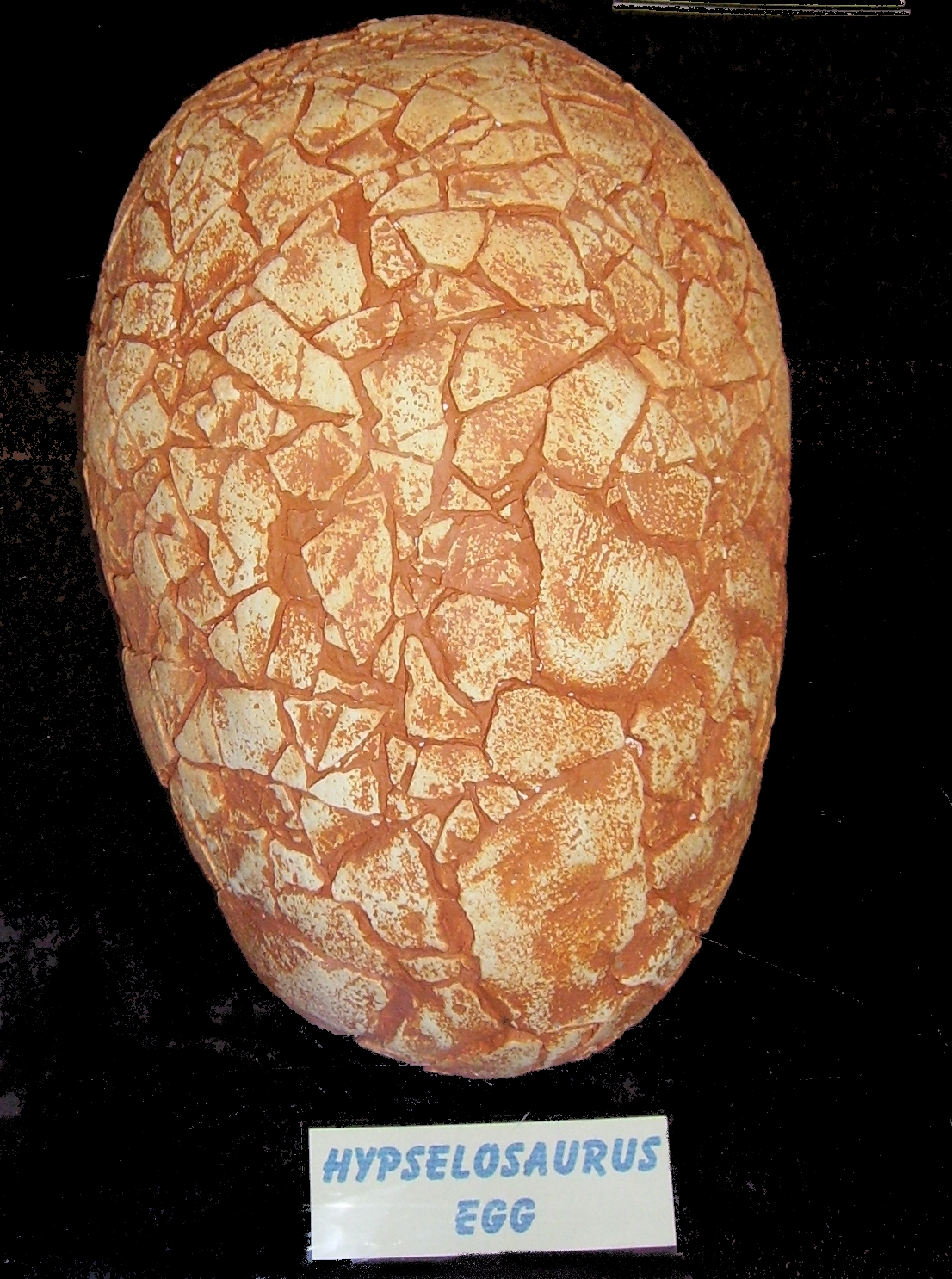
Hypselosaurus priscus egg.

Egg paleopathology is the study of evidence for illness, injury, and deformity in fossilized eggs. A variety of pathological conditions afflicting eggs have been documented in the fossil record. Examples include eggshell of abnormal thickness and fossil eggs with multiple layers of eggshell. The identification of egg paleopathologies is complicated by the fact that even healthy eggs can be modified during or after fossilization. Paleontologists can use techniques like cathodoluminescence or thin sectioning to identify true paleopathologies in fossil eggs. Despite the diversity of paleopathologies known from fossil eggs, the vast majority of conditions known to afflict modern eggs have not yet been seen among fossils.

== Identification ==
Differences in preservation and diagenesis make it difficult to confidently identify eggshell pathologies in the fossil record. Multilayered eggshell identification can be complicated if the secondary eggshell is disconnected from the original. When this happens the two shells can vary in structure and may even be mistaken as coming from different types of eggs. Stacked eggshells from collapsed or compressed eggs may resemble multilayered eggshells but in thin cross-sections viewed under a microscope the stacked shell will have mamillae facing opposite directions whereas egg shells that developed in layers on top of each other will have mamillae facing the same direction. Also, in stacked shells the layer separating the shells will resemble the sediment surrounding the fossil and in multilayer the layer between shells will resemble the primary shell more than the surrounding sediment.

Cathodoluminescence can be used to distinguish pathological egg shell from egg shell that has been altered diagenetically. Rigid egg shells, except in turtles, are composed of calcite. Since calcitic and aragonitic structures do not luminesce, signs of luminescence point to alterations to the chemical composition or structure of the shell. Magnesium-Calcite is sometimes replaced by Manganese-Calcite, which luminesces bright red-orange or yellow orange. In multilayer eggs the shells will appear the same color, but the shell membrane between them tends to be replaced by manganese-calcite that luminesces bright orange. Manganese is the primary instigator of luminescence whereas iron hinders it.

== Known paleopathologies ==
=== Abnormal shell thickness ===
Abnormally thin eggshell can allow excessive evaporation to dehydrate the embryo or shell membrane. Dehydrated membranes have a negative impact on gas permeability of the egg. Eggshell pathology can cause the shell to be so thin that the egg collapses. Abnormally thin eggshell has been attributed to Hypselosaurus priscus and some experts have speculated that this was the cause of the species' extinction, with vegetation changes, climatic change and overcrowding being the original impetus for the shell thinning. However, there are alternative explanations for the thin eggshell not dependent on pathology. Later researchers found resorption craters in the basal caps at the base of the columns, meaning that the eggs hatched. Some researchers postulated that the thinner "Hypselosaurus priscus" eggshells came from different taxa than the thicker eggshells, and subsequent researchers have come to support this idea. Another potential explanation for variation in eggshell thickness is that the thinner eggs were laid by younger individuals than older ones. There are also natural variations of eggshell thickness within a single species. Stressful environmental conditions may have resulted in dinosaur egg shells thinning. This may have played a role in dinosaur extinction, but is a controversial subject.

=== Multilayered shell ===
Multilayered eggs are known from the fossil record and were first reported from the Late Cretaceous of France and later India and Argentina. More recent discoveries of this pathology have been in Late Cretaceous strata in Montana and Late Jurassic strata in Utah. Multilayered eggs can cause embryos to suffocate as the extraneous layer's pore canals won't line up well enough with the original layers' to allow gas to travel to the embryo. Multilayered dinosaur eggs are known from, in order of discovery, France, Spain, Mongolia, India, Argentina, Canada, Montana, and Utah. Most multilayered dinosaur eggs are of the megaloolithid oofamily with a discretispherulitic morphotype. Other types of fossil eggs with these pathologies are prismatic, filispherulitic, dendrospherulitic, and prolatospherulitic morphotypes. Multilayered fossil eggs resemble those of modern forms in sometimes having incomplete extra layers and pore canals that don't properly align. The shell membranes of these eggs have been either dissolved or been replaced with secondary calcite. In the pathological specimens from Spain and Montana the redundant shell layer is as thick as in the original. In the specimen from Alberta it is only three fourths of the thickness of the original. The Utah specimen's pathological layer is only half that of the original. The egg is split open but still connected at one side. Some aspects of this egg suggests it was still in its mother's body when it was buried. The term ovum in ovo has been used for multilayered dinosaur eggs although this is inaccurate use of the term. Pathologies of eggshell are difficult to recognize in fossil specimens. Multilayered eggs are most common in the discretispherulitic egg morphotype and less common in others. This type of egg is attributed to sauropods. The greater abundance may indicate that these eggs were more prone to such pathologies, but are most likely due to a larger sample size of them. The pathological egg still inside its mother from Utah is a unique occurrence.

Oligocene strata from West Germany have produced 27 multilayered gecko eggs. Another multilayered egg from West Germany is not a gecko egg. The shells of these eggs were broken in the typical fashion of hatching eggs, interpreted by the original describers as meaning that the pathological eggshell was not fatal to the developing embryos. In a 2001 survey of fossil eggshell pathologies, Karl F. Hirsch criticized these authors on the basis that multilayered eggs were "very unlikely" to allow embryos to hatch because even if the pores of the secondary shell layer were perfectly aligned with those of the primary layer the eggshell would still be too thick for the struggling neonate to break free.

Extraspherulitic growth units are sometimes found in otherwise normal eggs. In Jurassic specimens from Colorado these are rare, but occupy almost the entire shell layer in specimens obtained from Late Cretaceous Montana. Egg shell has been recovered from the Milk River area of Alberta which may have been partially dissolved and then had additional calcite deposited on it.

== Undocumented pathologies ==
Irregularities in the surface of an egg and unusual egg shapes can be caused by convulsions or contractions of the uterus. Eggs can be wrinkled, bulged, ridged, or have nodules. Eggs can be restricted, bound, or truncated. These pathological eggs often have shell units and internal microstructures that are not interlocked as tightly as those of healthy eggs. These phenomena have not been found in fossil eggs. Ovum in ovo has low preservation potential and has not yet been observed in the fossil record. The term ovum in ovo has been used for multilayered dinosaur eggs although this is inaccurate use of the term. Pathologies of eggshell are difficult to recognize in fossil specimens. Hirsch concludes that the majority of pathological phenomena known to occur in modern eggs are not represented in the fossil record.

== See also ==
- Fossil egg
- Paleopathology
