= A Ruffer & Sons =

British accepting house

A Ruffer & Sons was a City of London accepting house founded in 1872 and dissolved in 1964.

== History ==
A Ruffer & Sons was a City of London accepting house, established as a private company in 1872 by Baron Alphonse Charles Jacques Alexandre (1819-1896) whose family had been merchants at Leipzig and Lyon specialising in the silk trade. By the turn of the century the bank had diversified into supporting farming and the wool trade in both French and Belgium Flanders. Its general offices were located at 39 Cornhill in the City of London. Hit badly by losses during the First World War it was forced to seek a loan from the Bank of England and convert from a partnership to a limited company, with the bank as primary shareholder. These shares were put up for disposal by the Disposal and Liquidation Commission, but in 1924 were transferred to the Securities Trust.

Further losses during the 1930s, and the Second World War led to the company being liquidated voluntarily in 1941.

== See also ==
- Marc Armand Ruffer
- Maurice Ruffer
