= William Brandt's Sons and Co =

William Brandt's Sons & Co. Ltd was an Anglo-German merchant bank and accepting house in the early nineteenth and late twentieth century.

== History ==
The bank was established by the Brandts, a well-respected (Lutheran) German mercantile family, from Hamburg. Emmanuel Henry Brandt opened his first office in London during 1805 where his postal address was Batson's Coffee House and later at 34 Lombard Street. A branch of the firm had also been opened in Arkhangelsk, Russia in 1802.

The London business prospered and as a result of growing trade with Russia, it became fully independent in 1865. Some years earlier the firm had to a large extent left the purely merchanting business and turned more to the merchant banking side by giving advances on an acceptance basis against overseas produce shipped, or be to shipped and sold through them.

The firm’s most active trade was with Russia (particularly in Arkhangelsk, Riga and Saint Petersburg) until 1875 when it began trading in Argentine grain movements and meat refrigeration.

Their Russian interests also included sugar refineries, sawmills, cordage factories, tanneries, iron foundries, cotton mills, and wharfs. Several members of the family held prominent positions with Wilhelm becoming consul for the city of Hamburg and in 1832 Edmund became United States consul in Arkhangelsk. The firm was the leading shipper in Arkhangelsk between 1819 and 1900.

Interestingly, today’s Peter the Great Technical School Building was the original Brandt House.

The London arm took over the Calcutta house of Scholvin and Co. in 1886 and thereby extended its interests to India. The company had the name William Brandt's Sons and Company Limited at the time with offices at 4 Fenchurch Avenue in the City of London.

Brandt had capital of 0.35 million pounds in 1880 rising to 0.75 million pounds by 1904 and one million by 1914. Brandt's was a founding member of the Accepting House Committee that was set up at the beginning of the First World War and acceptances accounted for a substantial part of its business. By 1914, acceptance liabilities in Russia accounted for less than 10 percent of Brandt's business and the largest portion of acceptance business was with the United States (almost 35 percent).

The business remained one of London's leading merchant banks with a large acceptance business from 1820 to 1965.

In 1894 its partners were Alfred Ernst Brandt, Arthur Henry Brandt, and Augustus Ferdinand Brandt. Henry Bernhard Brandt and Augustus Philip Brandt also became partners in 1895 but Alfred had ceased to be a partner in the following year. Rudolph Ernst Brandt joined the firm in 1898, replacing Arthur.

The family were the principal financiers behind the German Hospital in Dalston, completed in 1845.

They diversified into investment management, property, and insurance in the early 1960s. In addition, the bank fully acquired Jensen Motors in 1968.

Other subsidiaries included a successful timber and forest products business that was established by a Russian cousin after the revolution. This was extended to being the sole agency business for all Polish forest products via a joint venture with Paged in the 1980s. The family also managed one of the few successful United Kingdom commercial activities with Russia during the Cold War.

Brandt's sold 1/3 of their shares to National and Grindlays Bank in 1965 who then fully acquired the remaining balance in 1976. Its most infamous former employee, John Bingham, 7th Earl of Lucan, resigned from a position he held with the bank.

The bank had remained an independent, family-run business for seven generations.
