= Marc Armand Ruffer =

British pathologist (1859–1917)

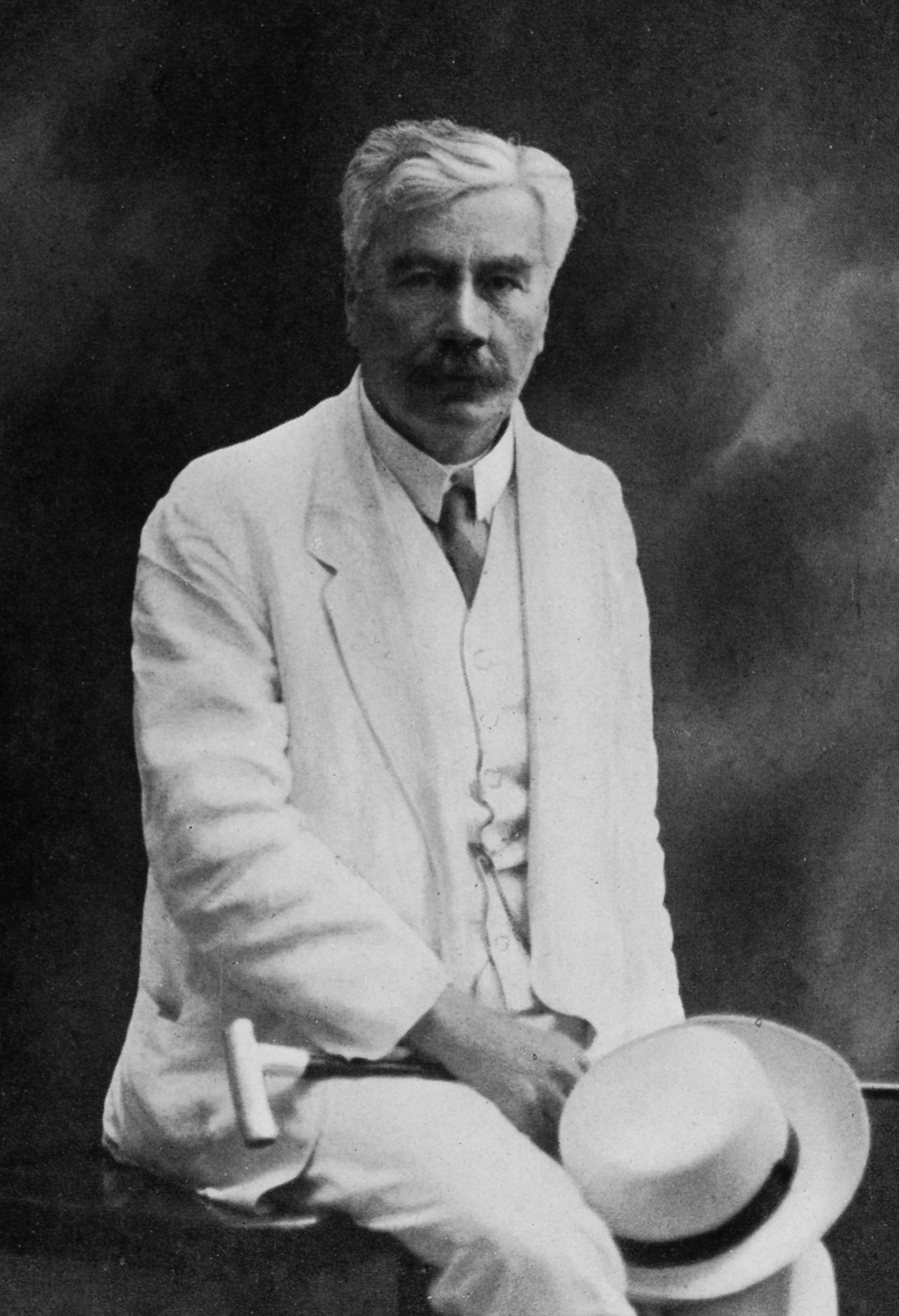
- Born: August 29, 1859; Lyon, France
- Disappeared: April 15, 1917 (aged 57); Aegean Sea
- Citizenship: British
- Education: Brasenose College, Oxford; University College London; Pasteur Institute
- Occupations: Pathologist, bacteriologist, and academic
- Employer(s): British Institute of Preventive Medicine; Faculty of Medicine, Cairo University
- Organization: British Red Cross Society
- Known for: Pioneer of modern paleopathology

Sir Marc Armand Ruffer CMG (29 August 1859 – 15 April 1917) was a British academic and an experimental pathologist and bacteriologist. He is considered a pioneer of modern paleopathology.

== Early life ==
Ruffer was born in Lyon, France, on 29 August 1859. He was the fifth of nine children of the Swiss banker Alphonse Charles Jacques Ruffer (1819–1896, first Baron de Ruffer) and his wife, Anne Caroline Prieger (1826–1890) from Bad Kreuznach in the Kingdom of Prussia. His older brother was the British banker Maurice Ruffer (1857–1935).

He was educated in Germany and France before attending Brasenose College, Oxford (1878–1881) and reading medicine at University College London. He also studied at the Pasteur Institute in Paris under Louis Pasteur.

Ruffer was naturalized as a British citizen in 1890.

== Career ==
In 1891, he was appointed the first director of the British Institute of Preventive Medicine, latterly the Lister Institute of Preventive Medicine. Moving to Egypt for health reasons, Ruffer was appointed a professor of bacteriology at the Faculty of Medicine, Cairo University in 1896, later serving on committees dealing with health, disease, and sanitation. In Egypt, he worked on the histology of mummies, publishing his findings and helping to establish the field of paleopathology. He is considered a pioneer of modern paleopathology.

Ruffer went to Greece during World War I in the capacity as commissioner of the British Red Cross Society to improve sanitation. Returning to Egypt on board the ship SS Arcadian on 15 April 1917, his ship was torpedoed off the Greek coast near the island of Milos without warning by the German submarine UC-74 with the loss of 279 lives, 35 of which were crew. He was seen on two occasions floating in the sea; the first time he was alive and upright, and on the second occasion his body was floating, believed dead. His body was never recovered from the sea. He was declared legally dead in 1918.

== Honors ==
Ruffer was made a Companion of the Order of St Michael and St George (CMG) of Great Britain in 1905 and was knighted in 1916. He also received the Grand Cross of the Order of Osmanieh and the Order of the Medjidie from the Ottoman Empire; the Order of the Redeemer (2nd class) of Greece; Commander (2nd class) in the Order of Saint Anna of Russia; and the Order of the Crown of Italy.

== Personal life ==
Ruffer married Alice Mary Greenfield in 1890. They had three children, including Nina Ruffer, who studied anthropology at Somerville College, Oxford and was mentioned by Vera Brittain in the Testament of Youth. Lady Ruffer died in Alexandria, Egypt, in 1950.

After research by the In from the Cold Project, Ruffer was accepted on 17 September 2016 for commemoration by the Commonwealth War Graves Commission on their Mikra Memorial in Kalamaria, Thessaloniki, Greece, to those who have no known grave.

== See also ==
- List of people who disappeared mysteriously at sea

== Book ==
- A. T. Sandison (1 April 1967). "Sir Marc Armand Ruffer (1859–1917) pioneer of palaeopathology". Medical History. 11 (2): 150–6. doi:10.1017/s002572730001200x. PMC 1033695. PMID 5342754.
- Carol R. Ember & Melvin Ember (2003). Encyclopedia of Medical Anthropology: Health and Illness in the World's Cultures Topics. Springer. pp. 50. ISBN 978-0-306-47754-6.
