= Super Star (ride) =

Fairground ride

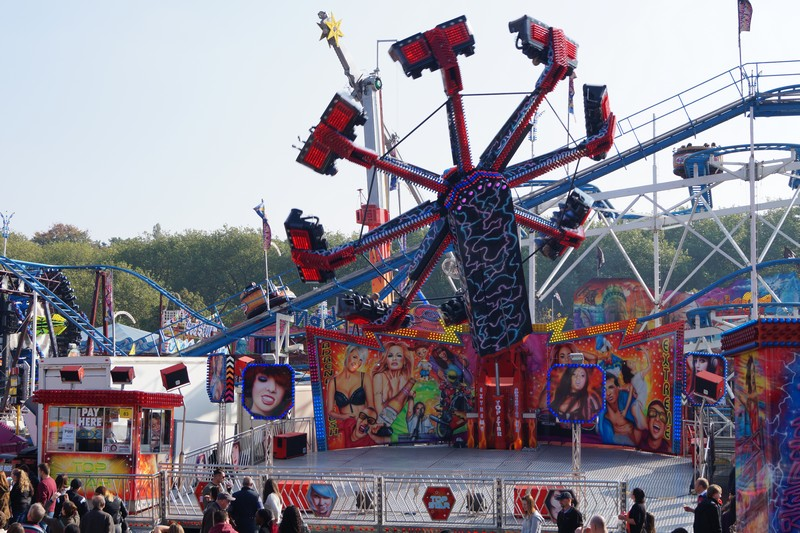
An example of a Super Star ride, owned by Michael Houghton entitled Top Star.

A Super Star (alternatively Superstar) is a fairground ride once manufactured by Northern Amusements (NA Superides).

The construction of the ride involves a single boom arm which twists around its own axle, lifting a spinning frame of 8 main arms with a 4-person seat gondola. In the rear of the gondola there is a hydraulic ram which pulls the seating units into an outward position. Once in this position the riders will be at a 90-degree angle when the ride is lifted to its 45 degree position. A safety system will then engage at the bottom of the ride to prevent the gondola from coming down in the event of an emergency.

When the ride is in its elevated position, the operator has the choice of rotating the main boom clockwise, or anti-clockwise. On the Super Star owned by showman Albers Bros., the boom can be lowered while the ride is in the fully inverted position. This form of operation was banned due to the arm getting stuck in this position, and the stress causing cracks in the main arm.

Super Star rides are capable of having a complete back-flash fitted with airbrushed artwork and neon lighting. The ride fits onto one semi-trailer and has a fairly quick build-up time.

The Super Star is loosely related to the Move-It.

After a 2002 accident and investigation finding manufacturing defects on the ride, Super Star rides were prohibited in the UK for a period.

In 2024, two panels from a Super Star ride operating at 'Chestival', a student event at Chester University, broke free, injuring students.
