= Maurice Ruffer =

British banker

- Born: 1 May 1857; Lyon, France
- Died: 20 February 1935 (aged 77)
- Occupation: Banker
- Known for: A Ruffer & Sons
- Relatives: Sir Marc Armand Ruffer (brother)

Maurice Pierre Ruffer (1 May 1857 – 20 February 1935) was a French-born British banker.

== Early life ==
Maurice Pierre Ruffer was the son of Baron Alphonse Charles Jacques Alexandre Ruffer (1819–1896, first Baron de Ruffer), who founded the bank A Ruffer & Sons in 1872, the family having been silk merchants in Leipzig and Lyon. His mother was Anne Caroline Prieger (1826-1890) from Bad Kreuznach in Germany. His younger brother Sir Marc Armand Ruffer was an experimental pathologist and bacteriologist. The British fund manager and philanthropist Jonathan Ruffer (born 1951) is a great-grandson of Maurice Ruffer.

== Personal life ==
In 1883, Maurice Ruffer married Coraly Sophie Henriette Straehelin (born 20 March 1862, died 31 Nov 1925). They had four children:

- Stengelin Ferdinand Robert Ruffer (1884–1955). Father of Major John Edward Maurice Ruffer (1912–2010), who in turn was the father of Jonathan Ruffer;
- Charles Ernest Ruffer (1885–1943);
- Alix Violet Coraly Ruffer (1888–1935);
- Roland Ruffer (1895–1942).

In 1897, Maurice Ruffer acquired the lease on Lyncombe, 1 Crescent Wood Road, Sydenham Hill, London, a banker, of 39 Lombard Street, after the previous owner Henry Gover (c. 1835–1895), a solicitor and educationist had died there in 1895. In 1923, the lease passed to Francis Ellis, a merchant of 26 & 27 Farringdon Street.

From 1911 to 1922 (at least), he was living at 33 Belgrave Square, where in 1911, he had ten servants. In 1955, the Spiritualist Association of Great Britain purchased the lease of the house as their headquarters.

== Death ==
Ruffer died on 20 February 1935.
