= Disposal and Liquidation Commission =

The Disposal and Liquidation Commission was a body set up in 1921 by the British government to sell off surplus war supplies and equipment, particularly those appertaining to the Ministry of Munitions following the First World War.
