= Accepting house =

An accepting house was a primarily British institution which specialised in the acceptance and guarantee of bills of exchange thereby facilitating the lending of money. They took on other functions as the use of bills declined, returning to their original wider function of merchant banking. The 'Accepting Houses' in the City of London had representation in Westminster by the Accepting Houses Committee which ensured policy coordination between them, the UK Treasury and the Bank of England. Bills endorsed by members of the Committee were originally eligible for rediscount at the Bank of England, although this right was eventually extended to other banks in the UK and abroad. The term accepting house was more of an indication of status rather than function.

Examples of UK accepting houses were Hambros Bank, Hill Samuel, Morgan Grenfell, Rothschild, J. Henry Schroder Wagg, Arbuthnot Latham, Seligman Brothers, William Brandts and S.G. Warburg. Most accepting houses were absorbed into larger banking entities during the 1980s and 1990s.
