= Ruffer Investment Company =

Investment management company

Ruffer Investment Company Limited
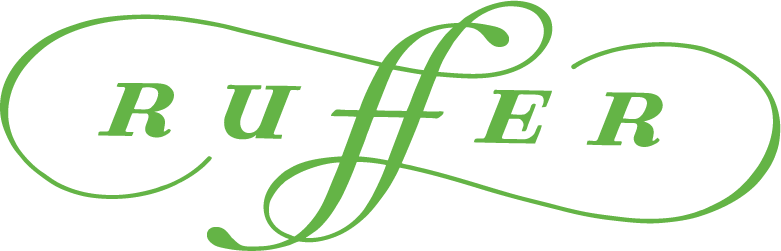
- Type: Public
- Traded as: LSE: RICA; FTSE 250 component
- Industry: Investment management
- Founded: 1994
- Founders: Jonathan Ruffer; Robert Shirley; Jane Tufnell
- Headquarters: London, UK
- Key people: Henry Maxey, Chairman and Co-CIO; Chris Bacon CEO
- AUM: Over £18.0bn
- Number of employees: Over 240
- Website: ruffer.co.uk

Ruffer Investment Company (LSE: RICA) is a British investment company dedicated to investments in internationally listed or quoted equities or equity related securities. Established in 1994, the company is listed on the London Stock Exchange and is a constituent of the FTSE 250 Index. The chairman is Nicholas Pink. It is managed by Ruffer LLP, which was founded by Jonathan Ruffer.

Ruffer’s single investment strategy is defined by two simple investment objectives: not to lose money in any 12 month period and generate returns meaningfully ahead of the return on cash.

Ruffer LLP has offices in London, Edinburgh and Paris and opened a US office in New York City in May 2023.
