= Gaunless Viaduct =

Viaduct in County Durham, England

Coordinates: 54.6221°N 1.8024°W

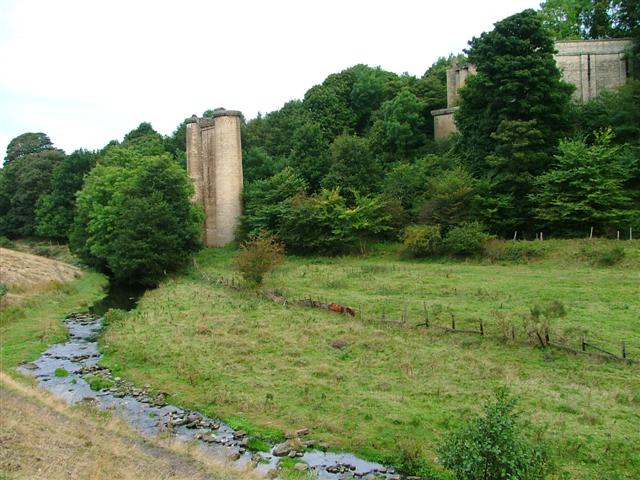

Gaunless Viaduct, also known as the Lands Viaduct, was a railway viaduct in County Durham. It was designed by Thomas Bouch to carry the South Durham and Lancashire Union Railway between Bishop Auckland and Barnard Castle over the River Gaunless at Lands, also crossing the Haggerleases branch of the railway to Butterknowle.

Bouch designed the viaduct in 1862 and it was built as four lattice truss spans supported on diagonally staggered, paired circular brick piers. It opened on 1 August 1863, at a cost of £15,422. It was approximately 93 feet (28m) feet high with a total span of 640 feet (200 m).

The viaduct was built for double track widths, although only a single line was laid at first. In 1899 work began to lay this second line, but it was found that the ironwork of the trusses was so badly decayed that they needed to be replaced. This work took until at least 1903. Several photographs exist showing the bridge at this time, still operating but with the spans supported by substantial timber shoring beneath them.

== Demolition ==
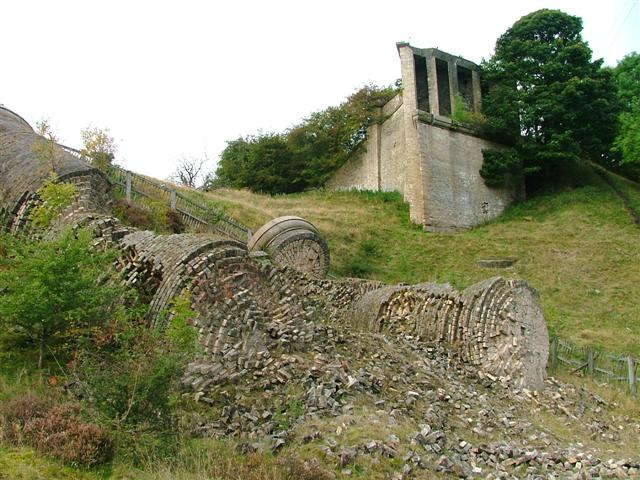
Demolished piers today

During the 1950s and early 1960s, the line saw a series of station closures, part of a wider pattern that predated the Beeching Axe. Passenger and goods services between Bishop Auckland and Barnard Castle, which crossed the viaduct, were withdrawn in June 1962 following the earlier closure of intermediate stations.

The Butterknowle branch, known by that name since 1899 (formerly the Haggerleases branch), also declined as coal reserves were exhausted. Low Butterknowle Pit closed in 1956, followed by Gordon House Colliery in 1961 and Cockfield Drift in 1962. The branch line itself was closed on 30 September 1963.

A little over a century after it opened, the viaduct was dismantled. In 1964, the truss girders were removed for scrap. Two years later, in 1966, explosives were used to bring down two of the brick piers, which were left where they fell.
