= Copley, County Durham =

Village in County Durham, England

Coordinates: 54.622°N 1.867°W

Copley
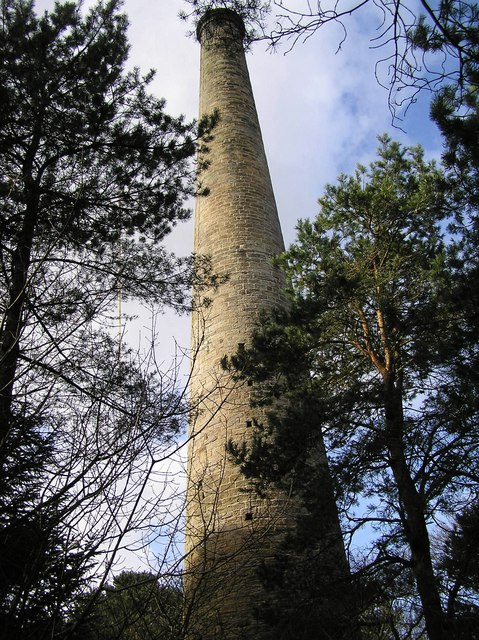
- Copley Chimney, built in 1832 as part of the Gaunless lead Mill

- Location within County Durham
- Population: 400
- OS grid reference: NZ086252
- Unitary authority: County Durham
- Ceremonial county: County Durham
- Region: North East
- Country: England
- Sovereign state: United Kingdom
- Post town: DARLINGTON
- Postcode district: DL13
- Police: Durham
- Fire: County Durham and Darlington
- Ambulance: North East

Copley is a village of roughly 400 inhabitants in County Durham, England. It is situated 9 miles west of Bishop Auckland, and 6 miles from Barnard Castle. It has a rural setting close to the North Pennines area. The lower part of the village by the River Gaunless still retains the original Copley Chimney (accessible up a steep flight of steps) and some of the buildings from the old Gaunless Valley Lead Mill.

Copley has its own weather station run by the Met Office and Environment Agency. Because of its elevation above sea-level, around the 1,000 ft contour, and position in the north-east, this station is often one of the coldest in England with high incidences of ground frosts and snowfalls. Copley is in a relatively dry and sunny rain-shadow area in the shelter of the higher Pennines to the west. The same higher Pennines can create a local gusty effect if the wind blows from the west-south-west. This is called the Pennine Lee Wave and can appear suddenly and disappear just as quickly.

Copley has the distinction of the snowiest Met Office site in England and the 5th snowiest in the UK. The North Pennines are one of the snowiest parts of England and Copley Village sees snow falling on average 53 days each year. It is just east of the North Pennines AONB, home to one of only a handful of outdoor ski centres in England.

Copley has a village hall which is part of the Teesdale Village Halls' Consortium. No shops or public houses operate in the village.

== River Gaunless ==
Just below Copley Chimney is the confluence of Hindon Beck and Steele Gill, forming the River Gaunless. Heading upstream, Steele Gill splits in two, the southern tributary being Arn Gill. Accessible one mile or 1.6 kilometres to the west along a track that doubles as a public footpath then by crossing a field to Arn Gill Gorge is a 9 metre high waterfall called Jerry Force. A smaller double-feature exists 200 metres upstream on Arn Gill. This latter feature has no official name, though has been referred to as Tom Force on one online mapping service.

Jerry Force Waterfall, Copley, County Durham
