= Arthur Pond =

English painter and engraver

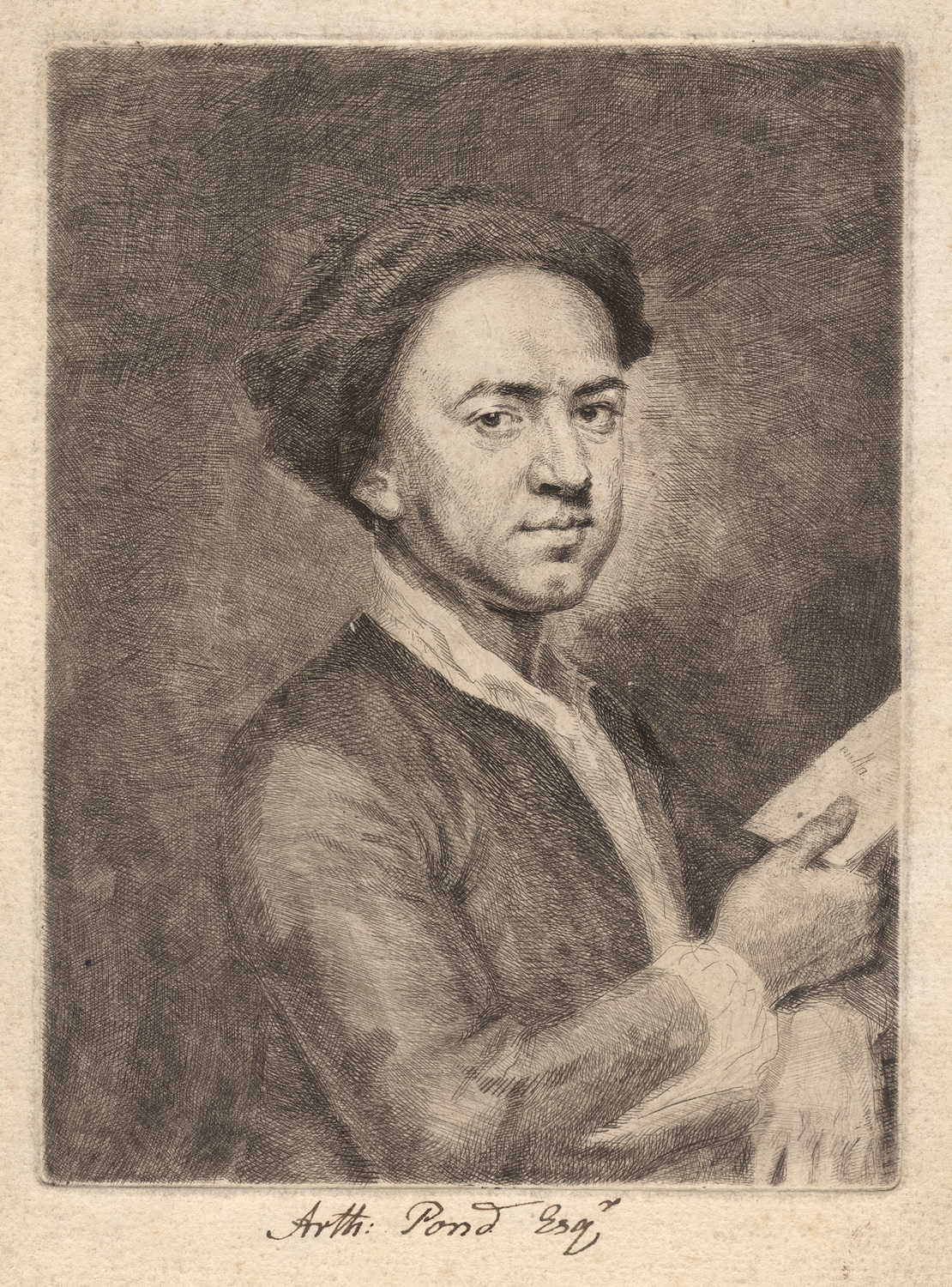
- Arthur Pond, 1739 self-portrait
- Born: 1705; London
- Died: 1758 (aged 52–53); London
- Occupation: Painter, etcher, copper engraver, miniaturist

Arthur Pond (c. 1705–1758) was an English painter and engraver.

== Life ==
Born about 1705, he was educated in London, and stayed for a time in Rome studying art, in company with the sculptor Roubiliac. He became a successful portrait-painter.

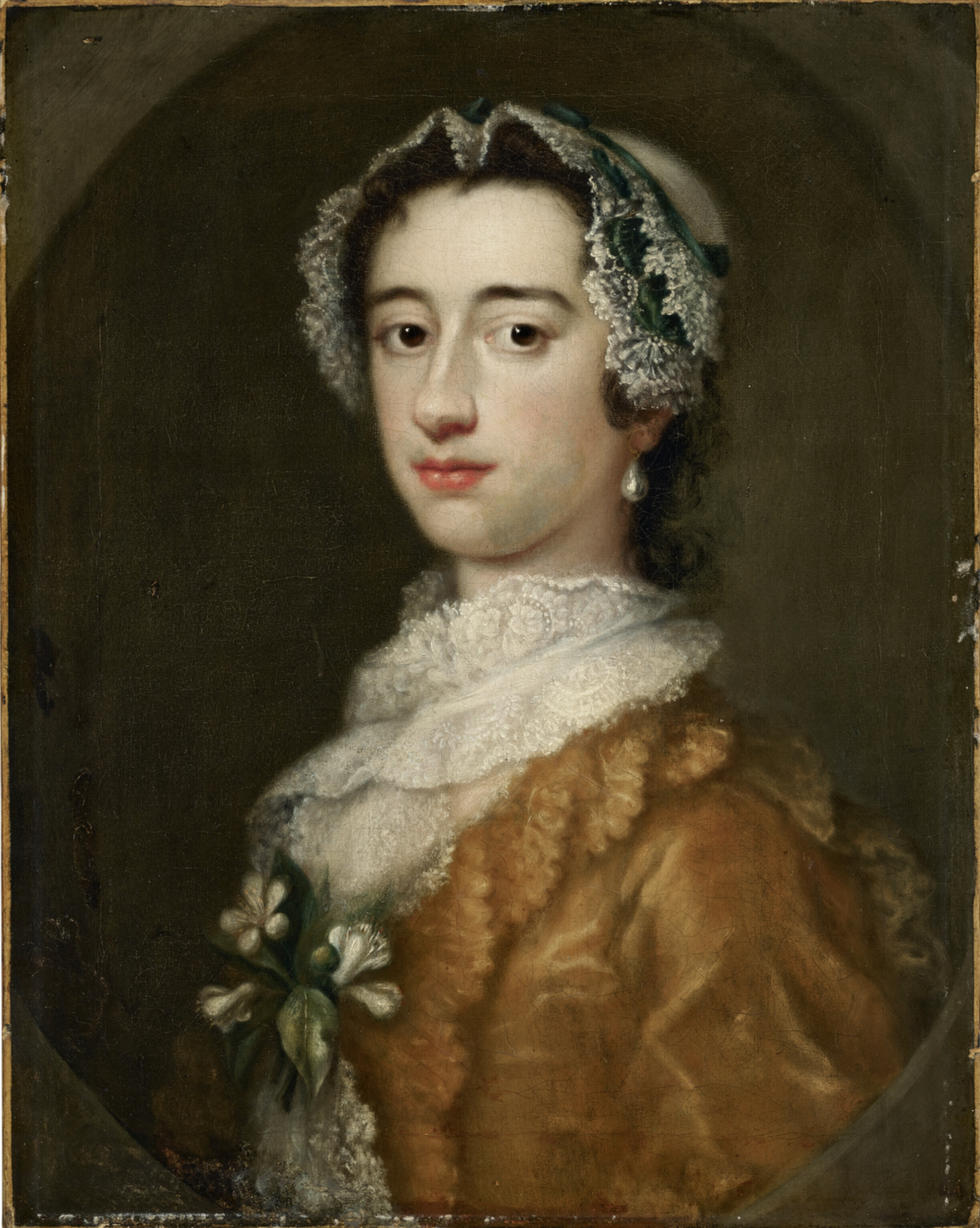
Portrait of a Lady traditionally identified as Eva Maria Garrick

From 1727 to about 1734 Pond lived at No. 16-17 Great Piazza, Covent Garden. He was elected a Fellow of the Royal Society in 1752, and died in Great Queen Street, Lincoln's Inn Fields, 9 September 1758. His collection of old master drawings was sold the following year, and realised over £1400.

== Works ==
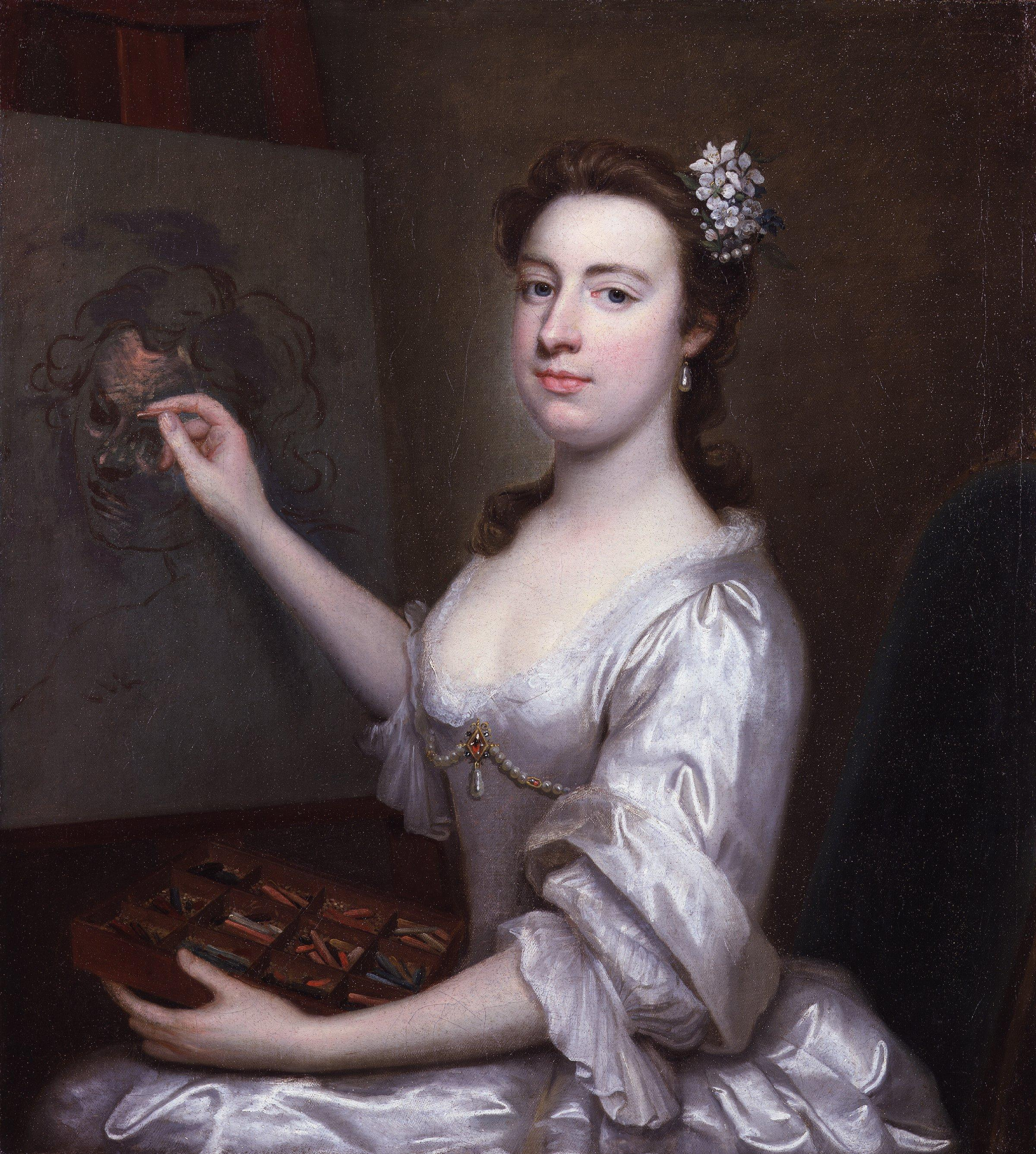
Portrait of Rhoda Delaval Astley, c. 1750, whom Pond taught to paint

His numerous original portraits include Alexander Pope, William, Duke of Cumberland, and Peg Woffington. Pond was also a prolific etcher, and used various mixed processes of engraving by means of which he imitated or reproduced the works of masters such as Rembrandt, Raphael, Salvator Rosa, Parmigianino, Caravaggio, and the Poussins.

In 1734–5 he published a series of his plates under the title Imitations of the Italian Masters. He also collaborated with George Knapton in the publication of the Heads of Illustrious Persons, after Jacobus Houbraken and George Vertue, with their lives by Thomas Birch (London, 1743–52); and engraved sixty-eight plates for a collection of ninety-five reproductions from drawings by famous masters, in which Knapton was again his colleague. Another of his productions was a series of twenty-five caricatures after Pier Leone Ghezzi, republished in 1823 and 1832 as Eccentric Characters.

In 1756 he was commissioned by Bishop of Durham Richard Trevor to paint the portrait of Benjamin missing from the set Jacob and his twelve sons painted by Francisco de Zurbarán. This hangs in the Long Dining Room at Auckland Castle.

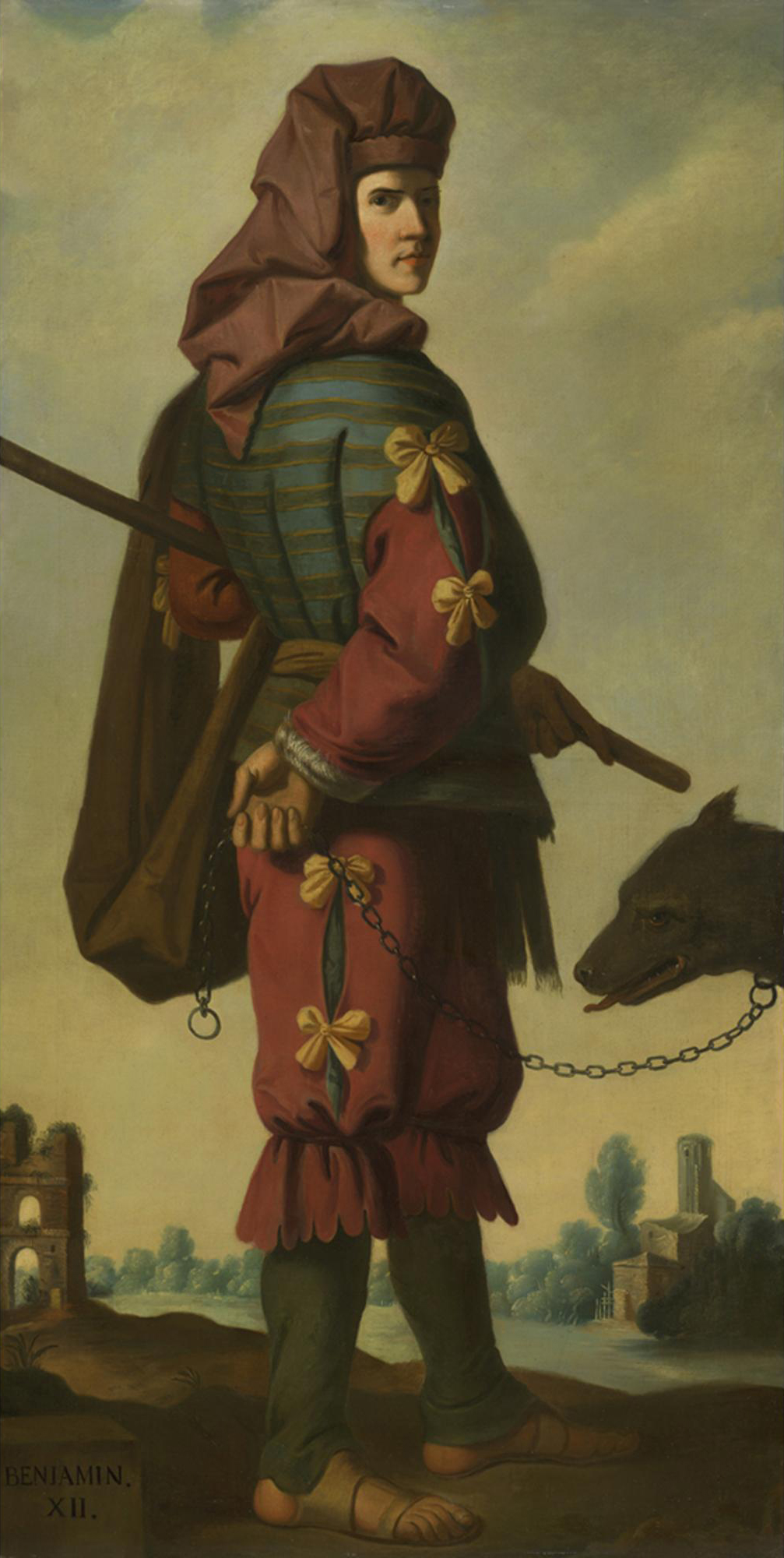
Benjamin from Jacob and his twelve sons
