= Auckland Castle =

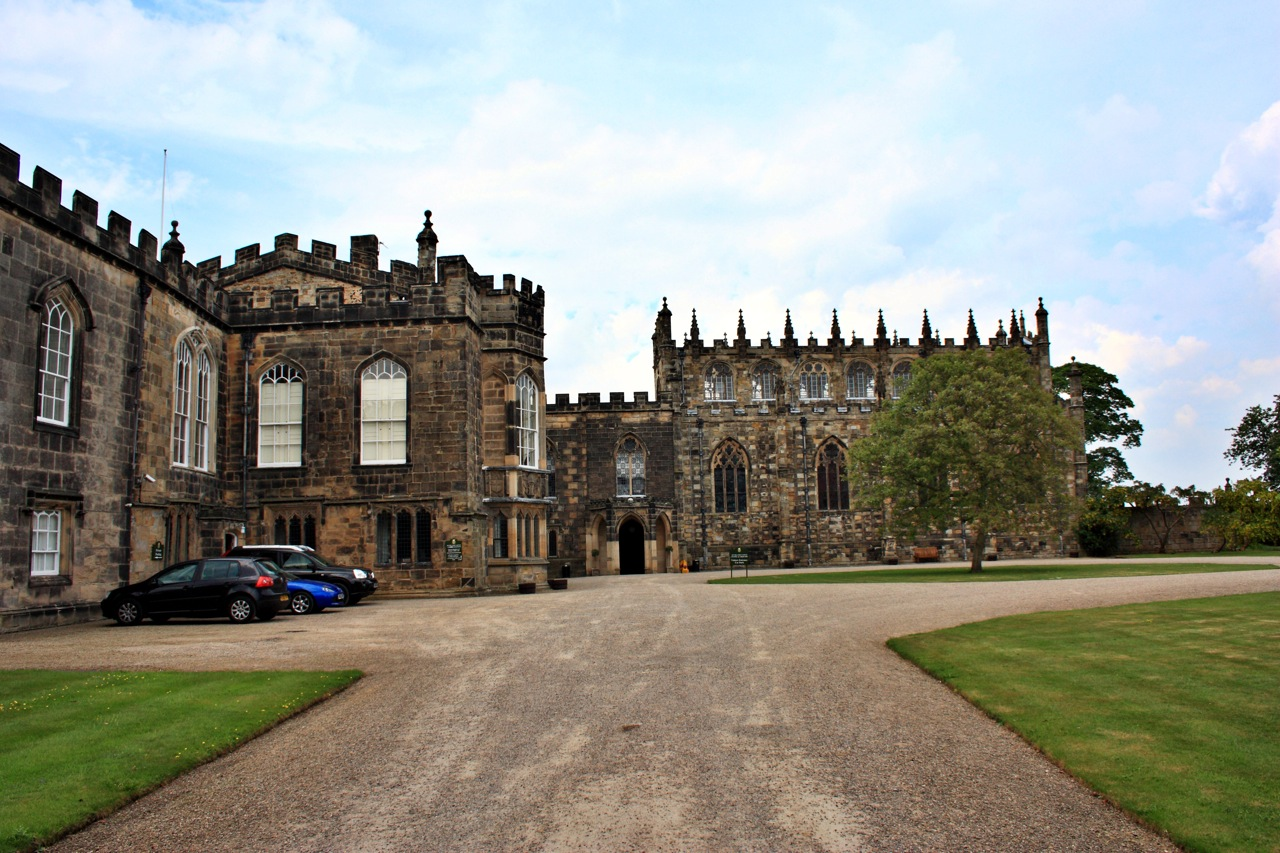
- Auckland Castle on the left, Chapel of St Peter in the centre

- Location within County Durham
- 54.6664°N 1.6702°W
- Location: Bishop Auckland, County Durham; DL14 7NR

History
- Built: c. 1183

Site notes
- Architectural styles: Gothic; Gothic Revival
- Owner: Auckland Castle Trust
- Website: aucklandproject.org/venues/auckland-castle/

Listed Building – Grade I
- Official name: Auckland Castle
- Designated: 21 April 1952
- Reference no.: 1196444

Listed Building – Grade I
- Official name: Chapel of St Peter at Auckland Castle
- Designated: 21 April 1952
- Reference no.: 1196446

National Register of Historic Parks and Gardens
- Official name: Auckland Castle Park
- Designated: 7 October 1986
- Reference no.: 1000727

Auckland Castle, also known as Auckland Palace, is a former bishop's palace located in the town of Bishop Auckland in County Durham, England. The castle was a residence of the bishops of Durham from approximately 1183 and was their primary residence between 1832 and 2012, when the castle and its contents were sold to the Auckland Castle Trust (now the Auckland Project). It is now a tourist attraction, but still houses the bishop's offices.

The castle is notable for its chapel, described as "one of the finest rooms in North East England" in the Buildings of England series, which was the medieval great hall until it was remodelled by Bishop John Cosin in 1661–1665. The woodwork, which includes the pulpit, stalls, and screen, was commissioned by Cosin and combines Gothic and Baroque forms. The castle also contains twelve paintings depicting Jacob and His Twelve Sons by the Spanish painter Francisco de Zurbarán; the thirteenth portrait, Benjamin, is a copy, as the original hangs in Grimsthorpe Castle, Lincolnshire. Auckland Castle is a grade I listed building.

== History ==
Auckland Castle occupies an area of flat ground between the River Gaunless and River Wear, south of their confluence. The town of Bishop Auckland abuts the castle to the west, and on the other three sides the land falls away steeply to the rivers. The castle was probably begun by Hugh de Puiset, who was bishop from 1153 to 1195, and completed in the first half of the thirteenth century. The present chapel survives from his building, where it served as the great hall.

A college for a dean and nine canons was established immediately west of the castle's enclosing wall by Bishop Booth in the fifteenth century.

In 1603 after the Union of the Crowns, Tobias Matthew invited Anne of Denmark, Prince Henry, and Princess Elizabeth to stay at Auckland on their journey from Scotland to London. After the disestablishment of the Church of England at the end of the First English Civil War in 1646, Auckland Castle was sold to Sir Arthur Haselrig, who demolished much of the medieval building, including the original two-storey chapel, and built a mansion. After the Restoration of the Monarchy, Bishop John Cosin in turn demolished Hazelrigg's mansion and rebuilt the castle, converting the banqueting hall into the chapel that stands today.

In 1756, Bishop Richard Trevor bought the notable set of paintings, Jacob and his twelve sons, by Francisco de Zurbarán which still hang in the Long Dining Room. It is possible that the seventeenth century paintings were intended for South America. However they never reached their supposed destination, eventually coming into the possession of James Mendez who sold twelve of the thirteen to Bishop Trevor in 1757.

Bishop Trevor was unable to secure the 13th portrait, Benjamin, which was sold separately to the Duke of Ancaster and hangs in Grimsthorpe Castle, Lincolnshire. Bishop Trevor commissioned Arthur Pond to produce a copy painting of "Benjamin". The copy, together with the 12 originals, hang in the castle's Long Dining Room, which Bishop Trevor had redesigned especially to take the pictures.

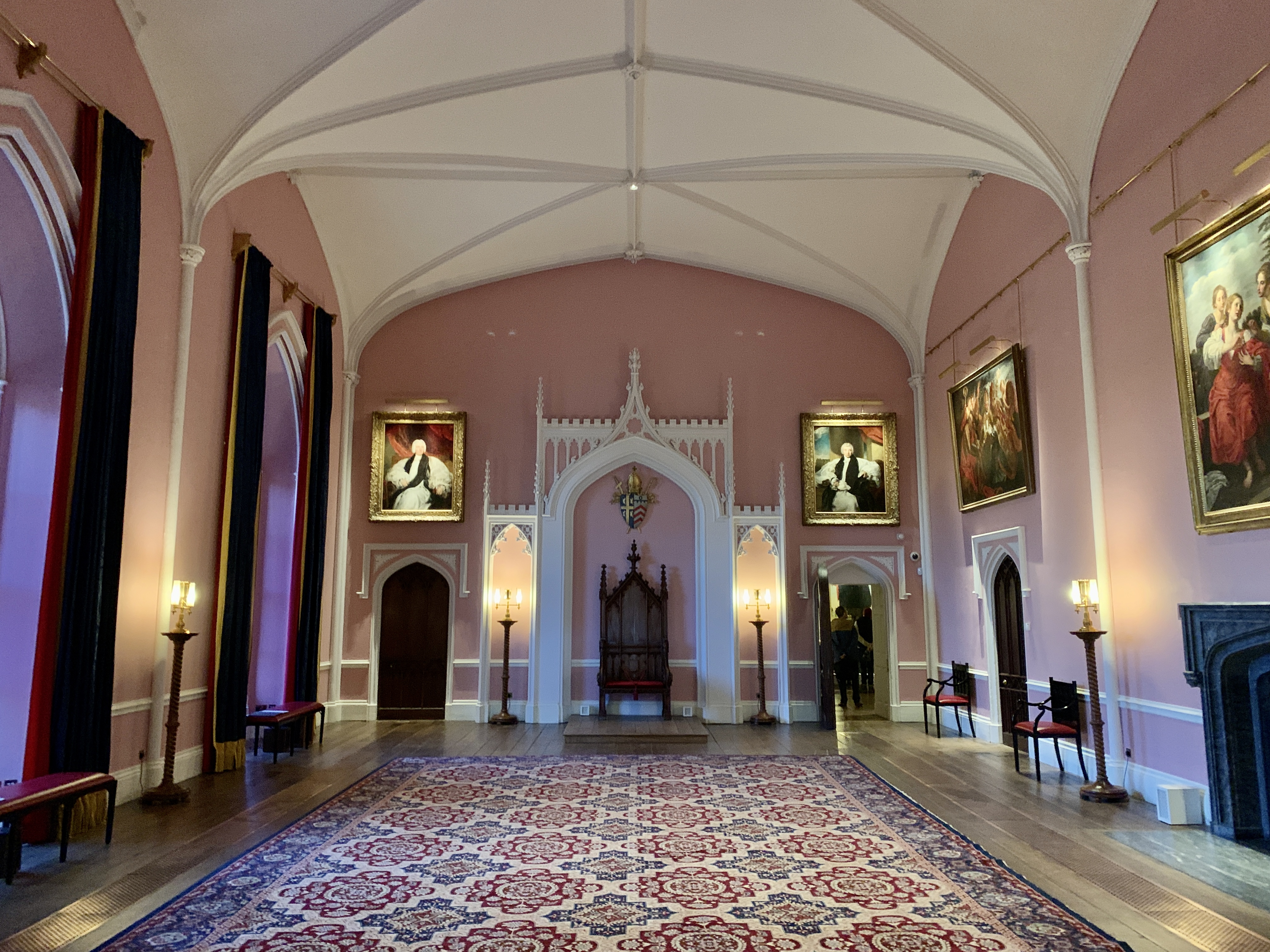
The Throne Room

Shute Barrington, Bishop of Durham from 1791 to 1826, employed the eminent architect James Wyatt to match the disparate architecture of the palace in the late 18th century, including its Throne Room and Garden Screen. In 1832, when William van Mildert, the last bishop to rule the county palatine of Durham, gave over Durham Castle to found Durham University, Auckland Castle became the sole episcopal seat of the See of Durham.

In 2001 the Church Commissioners voted to sell the paintings, a decision that was revoked in 2011 following a donation of £15 million by investment manager and philanthropist Jonathan Ruffer; new arrangements placed the paintings, along with the castle, under the Auckland Castle Trust, making them available to the public after centuries during which they hung in a private home where they could be seen only by invited guests or by special arrangement with the Bishop's staff.

=== 2019 re-opening ===
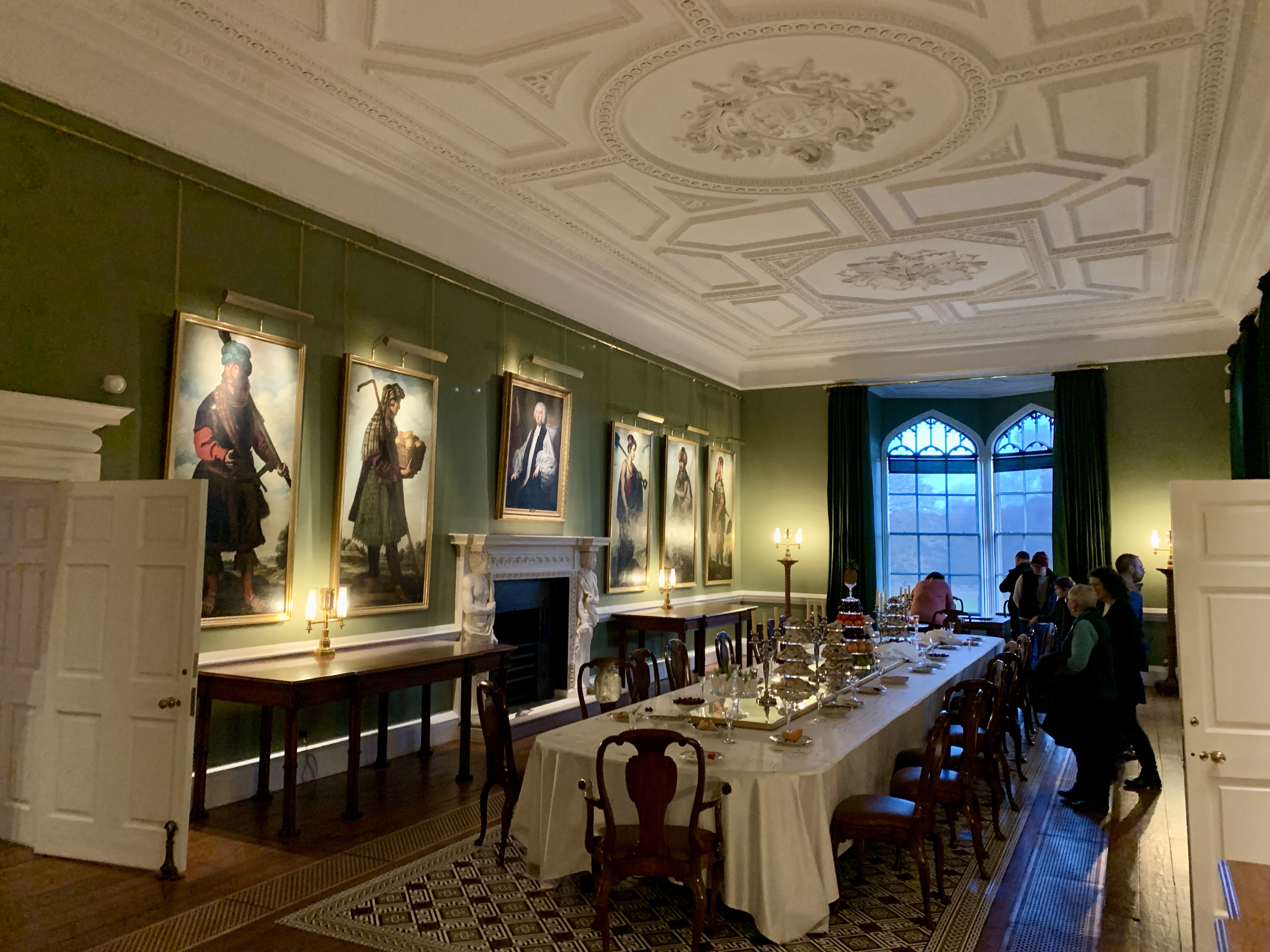
The dining room with the paintings of Jacob and his Twelve Sons by Francisco de Zurbarán

News reports in 2019 clarified the situation, stating that in 2012, Ruffer had purchased the castle and all of the contents, including the artwork, which included the works by Francisco de Zurbarán. The paintings, which had been on tour, were returned to the site in time for the re-opening of the castle to visitors on 2 November 2019 as the Auckland Project, after a multi-million pound restoration project, funded partly by the National Lottery.

By the time of the opening day, a new 115-foot (35 m) high tower had been erected as a visitor centre; the structure has a lift and a staircase as well as balconies for views of the castle from above. The interior had been fully restored, including the bishops' "palatial" quarters. According to one news item, "each of the 14 restored rooms, recreated from contemporary accounts and personal recollections" features the career of one former bishop. The Faith Museum of world religion and a huge glass greenhouse were under construction on Castle property.

Other attractions already operating at or near the Castle include the Mining Art Gallery (in a nearby former bank building) showing work mainly by self-taught or night school-educated miners; this attraction opened in 2017 (thanks to support provided to the Castle Trust by Bishop Auckland and Shildon AAP and Durham County Council); an open-air theatre, Kynren, depicting "An Epic Tale of England" with a cast of 1,000; and the Bishop Trevor Gallery at the Castle; the latter started displaying the National Gallery's Masterpiece touring exhibit in October 2019.

In October 2023, the Faith Museum opened to the public. Designed by Niall McLaughlin Architects, it covers 6000 years of British religious history, from the Neolithic period to 2000AD. It is housed in the Scotland Wing of the castle, as well as a new stone-built extension.

In May 2024, the 17th century walled gardens reopened, with a new glasshouse and faith garden. The Great Garden is set to open in 2025.

=== Bek's chapel ===
In February 2020, it was announced that the foundations of Bek's chapel had been found at the castle by archeologists. It had long been known that the chapel, which would have been one of the largest in Europe, was located on the castle grounds, but its location was unknown. The chapel was built by the warrior-bishop Antony Bek in roughly 1300 at a cost of £148. There was a special exhibition at Auckland Castle from 4 March 2020 to 6 September 2020 to display items found in the excavations.

== Archaeology ==
In June 2024, archaeologists working on the Auckland Project announced the discovery of a Golden Primrose flower decoration along with at least seven large wall remains and cellars filled with rubble. The wall remains are believed to be part of a rectangular building that belonged to Arthur Haselrig.

== Description ==
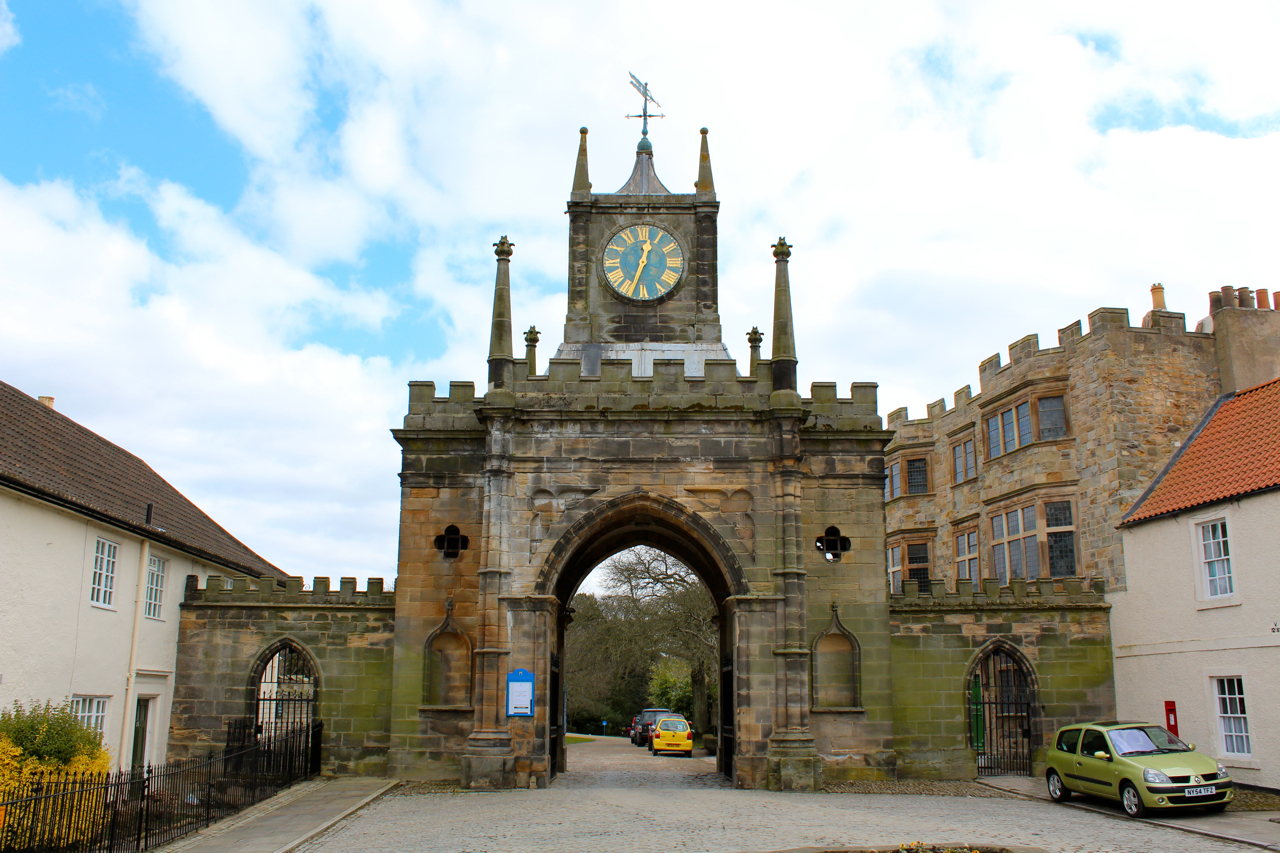
The clock tower

The castle grounds are entered from Bishop Auckland marketplace through the clock tower, which was built in 1760 by Bishop Trevor in the Gothick style. The range which flanks it to the right incorporates the remains of the south range of the fifteenth century college mentioned above; the north and east ranges behind also survive in part. Within the gates, the Faith Museum is to the north, within a gabled stone building intended to reflect the form of medieval tithe barns. To the south are the walled gardens and glasshouse, below a terrace. A castellated screen wall built for Bishop Shute Barrington in 1795 separates the terrace from the castle proper.

The main buildings form two sides of a courtyard. To the north is the large four-bay aisled chapel, originally the hall of Bishop Pudsey's palace. This was built in c.1190 with unusually ornate arcades and capitals, and remodelled in c.1300 for Bishop Bek. In 1661-65 it was converted for use as a chapel by Bishop Cosin, the original chapel having been destroyed in the Interregnum. At this time the exterior was heavily remodelled in the mixture of Gothic and Baroque characteristic of Cosin, and the clerestory was replaced. The western range housed the bishop's state rooms above the offices and service functions (now the café). At its heart this structure is that of Bek's extensive reconstruction, but this is now concealed by work of the 16th and 18th centuries. The state rooms as they now appear are largely the work of Wyatt in c.1795 for Bishop Barrington. They are in the Gothick style and include along with the normal suite of rooms an ante-room and throne room, as the Prince-Bishop of Durham had until the 19th century quasi-regal powers. The Long Dining Room houses the Zurbarán paintings, while the other rooms contain exhibits on the history of the castle, and the Bishop Trevor art gallery. Behind this range is the Scotland Wing, originally Bishop Tunstall's long gallery, but now part of the Faith Museum.

The Castle is surrounded by a deer park of 800 acres (320 ha) of parkland. It retains many of the medieval elements, including the fish ponds and woodland paths, providing an important record of how the medieval bishops lived, entertained and hunted there.

== Culture ==
The castle was used as the backdrop for Lewis Carroll's story "A Legend of Scotland" in the 19th century. In 2006, Auckland Castle was the setting for two episodes of BBC's Antiques Roadshow. In 2013, a 15th-century bed once owned by Henry VII was put on display at the castle.

== Notable structures and historic listing designations ==
The castle and its grounds contain seven structures listed by Historic England at Grade I, the highest grade. It also contains a number of buildings listed at Grade II* and Grade II.

Image	Name	Listed	Co-ordinates	Notes	Ref(s)
	Auckland Castle	Grade I	54.6664°N 1.6702°W	Probably begun in the 12th century and completed in the 13th century.	
	West Mural Tower and West Walls	Grade I	54.6663°N 1.6725°W	First wall built 14th century.	
	Entrance Gateway	Grade I	54.6657°N 1.6712°W	Built by Thomas Robinson in 1760 for bishop Trevor.	
	Chapel of St Peter	Grade I	54.6669°N 1.6699°W	Built as great hall around 1190, completed 1249 and converted to chapel 1661–65.	
	Screen Wall	Grade I	54.6662°N 1.6698°W	Built by James Wyatt around 1795 for bishop Barrington.	
	Deer Shelter	Grade I	54.6686°N 1.6666°W	Built around 1760.	
	Castle Lodge	Grade I	54.6656°N 1.6710°W	Built 17th century.	
	11 Market Place	Grade II*	54.6655°N 1.6715°W	Built early 18th century; formerly known as 18 Castle Square.	
	15 and 16 Market Place	Grade II	54.6658°N 1.6716°W	18th century park gatehouses.	
	17 and 18 Market Place	Grade II	54.6658°N 1.6718°W	Built early 18th century.	
	12 Market Place	Grade II	54.6656°N 1.6713°W	Built early 18th century, previously known as 19 Castle Square.	
	2 and 3 Castle Square	Grade II	54.6662°N 1.6715°W	Medieval use unknown; later Prebends' College, then carriage houses.	
	Westcott Lodge	Grade II	54.6660°N 1.6713°W	Built early-18th century.	
	Six pillars;	Grade II	54.6662°N 1.6723°W	Possibly 17th century hayshed.	
	Garden and Drive Walls	Grade II	54.6658°N 1.6701°W	Built 18th and 19th century, railings added 19th century.	
	Jock's Bridge	Grade II	54.6710°N 1.6694°W	Built 1819, forms park boundary wall.	
	Trevor's Bridge	Grade II	54.6706°N 1.6679°W	Built 1757.	
	Ice House	Grade II	54.6707°N 1.6672°W	Probably built late-18th century.	
	Footbridge over Coundon Burn	Grade II	54.6717°N 1.6670°W	Built mid-18th century.	
	Footbridge over Coundon Burn	Grade II	54.6721°N 1.6639°W	Built 1827.	
	Footbridge over Coundon Burn	Grade II	54.6714°N 1.6614°W	Built 18th century.	
	Well Head	Grade II	54.6724°N 1.6588°W	2m high pyramid, part of 18th century water supply to the castle.	
	Cistern	Grade II	54.6727°N 1.6567°W	Part of 18th century water supply to the castle.	
	Milestone on Castle Drive	Grade II	54.6740°N 1.6565°W	18th century.	
	Park Gates and Screen Wall	Grade II	54.6741°N 1.6439°W	Built late 18th century.	
	Lodge Farmhouse	Grade II	54.6770°N 1.6635°W	Built 1779 for bishopEgerton.	
	Stables and Barn of Lodge Farmhouse	Grade II	54.6770°N 1.6638°W	Built 1779.	
	Stables and Barn of Lodge Farmhouse	Grade II	54.6769°N 1.6632°W	Built 1779.	

== See also ==
- Castles in Great Britain and Ireland
- List of castles in England

== Bibliography ==
- Fordyce, William (1857). The History and Antiquities of the County Palatine of Durham. A. Fullarton and Co.
- Whellan, William (1856). History, Topography, and Directory of the County Palatine of Durham. William Whellan and Co.
- Hutchinson, Tom (2005). The History of Bishop Auckland. Seaham: The People's History. ISBN 1-902527-59-3.
