= Jacob and His Twelve Sons =

Painting series by Francisco de Zurbarán

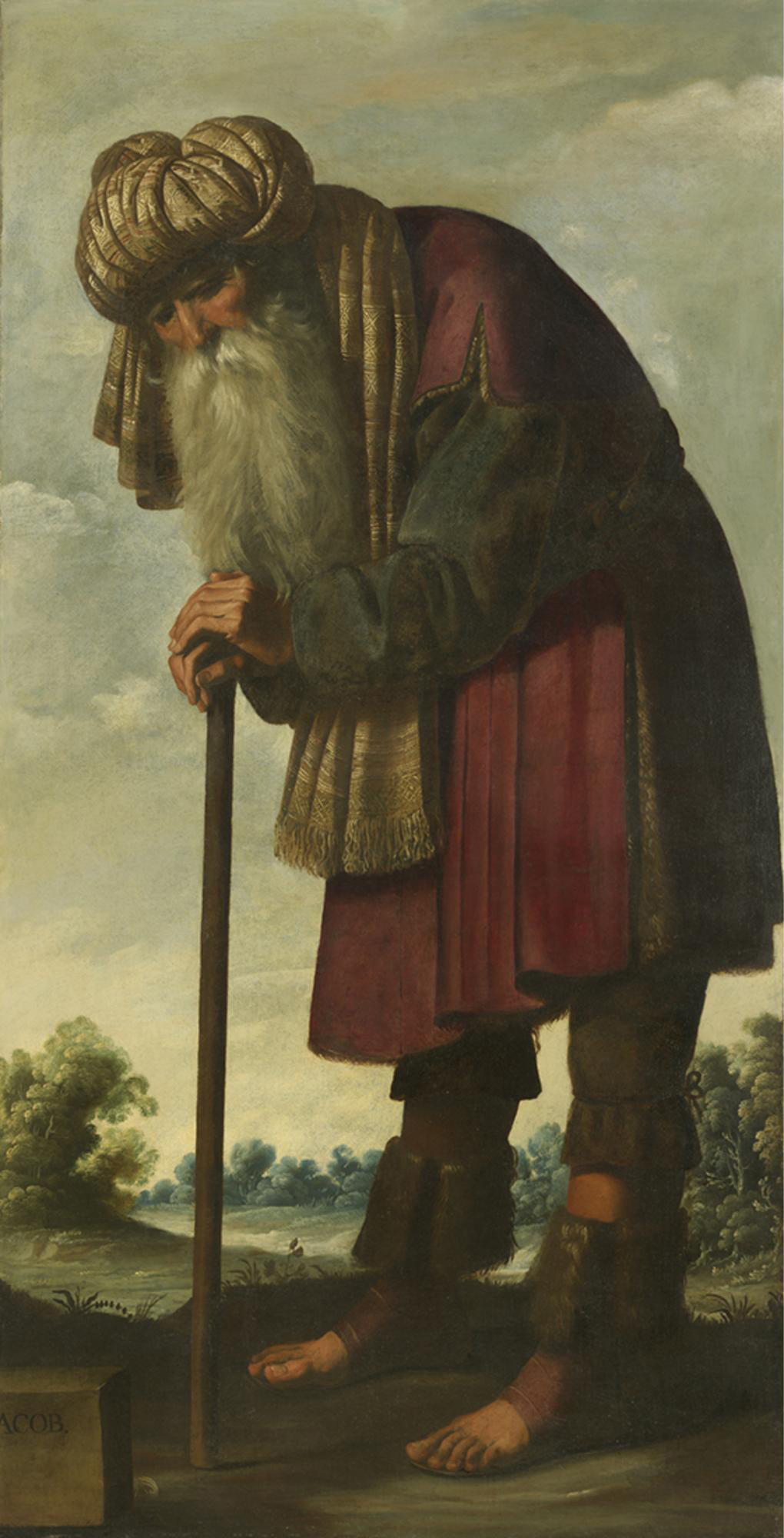
Jacob by Zurbarán

Jacob and his twelve sons (Spanish: Jacob y sus doce hijos) is a series of thirteen paintings by Spanish artist Francisco de Zurbarán.

The series of life-size portraits was painted between 1641 and 1658. All of the paintings are in England: twelve at Auckland Castle, the former bishop's palace in County Durham, and one at Grimsthorpe Castle, Lincolnshire. As at 2026 some of the canvases are away from their usual home for conservation or on loan to exhibitions.

== Paintings ==
The depiction of Jacob, the Biblical patriarch, and his sons in epic portraits is unusual for the era. More commonly, artists, including Ribera and Velázquez, included these men in narrative painting of Biblical episodes. There are two reasons to believe that the paintings may have been intended for a patron in Spanish America: firstly, Zurbarán was an active exporter of paintings to the New World, and secondly, there was an idea current in seventeenth-century Spain that the indigenous people of the Americas were the descendants of the "Ten Lost Tribes".

According to art historian Jeannine Baticle, a series of Jacob and his sons survives in the possession of the Orden Tercera de San Francisco in Lima, Peru, which she describes as a "fairly close replica" of the Auckland Zurbarán series. An additional series, "a more distant and awkward imitation", is in the possession of the Academia de Bellas Artes in Puebla, Mexico.

== History ==
It is not known how the paintings reached England, although some speculate that they may have been captured by English pirates while being transported from the painter's studio in Seville to a buyer in a Spanish colony in the Americas.

The series is first recorded in 1722 as part of the estate of one William Chapman. It was later owned by London banker James Mendez, a Jewish merchant of Portuguese descent, whose heirs sold twelve of the thirteen to Richard Trevor, Bishop of Durham in 1757. Bishop Trevor, a political liberal and a backer of the Jewish Naturalization Act 1753, acquired the paintings, and redesigned and reconstructed the Long Dining Room at Auckland Castle, as a public statement of his support for Jewish naturalization rights. Although the Act was quickly repealed, the paintings remained in the Long Dining Room at Auckland Castle.

The portrait of one of Jacob's sons, Benjamin, was not included in the sale, perhaps because the sellers identified with the tribe of Benjamin. It was sold separately to Peregrine Bertie, 3rd Duke of Ancaster and Kesteven; it hangs in Grimsthorpe Castle, Lincolnshire. Bishop Trevor commissioned Arthur Pond to produce a copy painting of "Benjamin". It hangs, with Jacob and the other eleven sons, in the room designed for them more than two and a half centuries ago.

=== 21st century ===
In 2001 the Church Commissioners voted to sell the paintings. This decision was revoked in 2011 following a donation of £15 million by investment manager and philanthropist Jonathan Ruffer; as part of a new arrangement placing the paintings, along with the castle, under the Auckland Castle Trust. This made the paintings available to the public after centuries during which they hung in a private home, only seen by invited guests or by special arrangement with the Bishop's staff.

During the renovation of Auckland Castle, the series (including the Grimsthorpe canvas) travelled to the Americas. The paintings crossed the Atlantic for the first time in 2016, to be displayed at the Meadows Museum in Dallas, Texas, from 17 September 2017 until 7 January 2018, and then in New York City at the Frick Collection from 31 January until 22 April 2018. The exhibition travelled to the Israel Museum in Jerusalem later that year. Zurbarán. Jacob and His Twelve Sons. Paintings from Auckland Castle, a catalogue with contributions by scholars from both sides of the Atlantic, was published by the Centro de Estudios Europa Hispánica (CEEH). The Auckland Project and the CEEH co-produced a film looking at the impact of the travelling exhibition, entitled Zurbarán and his Twelve Sons. It was directed by Arantxa Aguirre.

The CEEH supported a project to restore the paintings. Joseph and Asher were conserved at the National Gallery in London ahead of display there in 2026 in the first major monographic show dedicated to Zurbarán in the UK. (Some of the paintings had been shown in the National Gallery in 1994.) The exhibition was opened by Queen Sofía of Spain in May 2026 and is expected to transfer to Paris and Chicago.

== Gallery ==
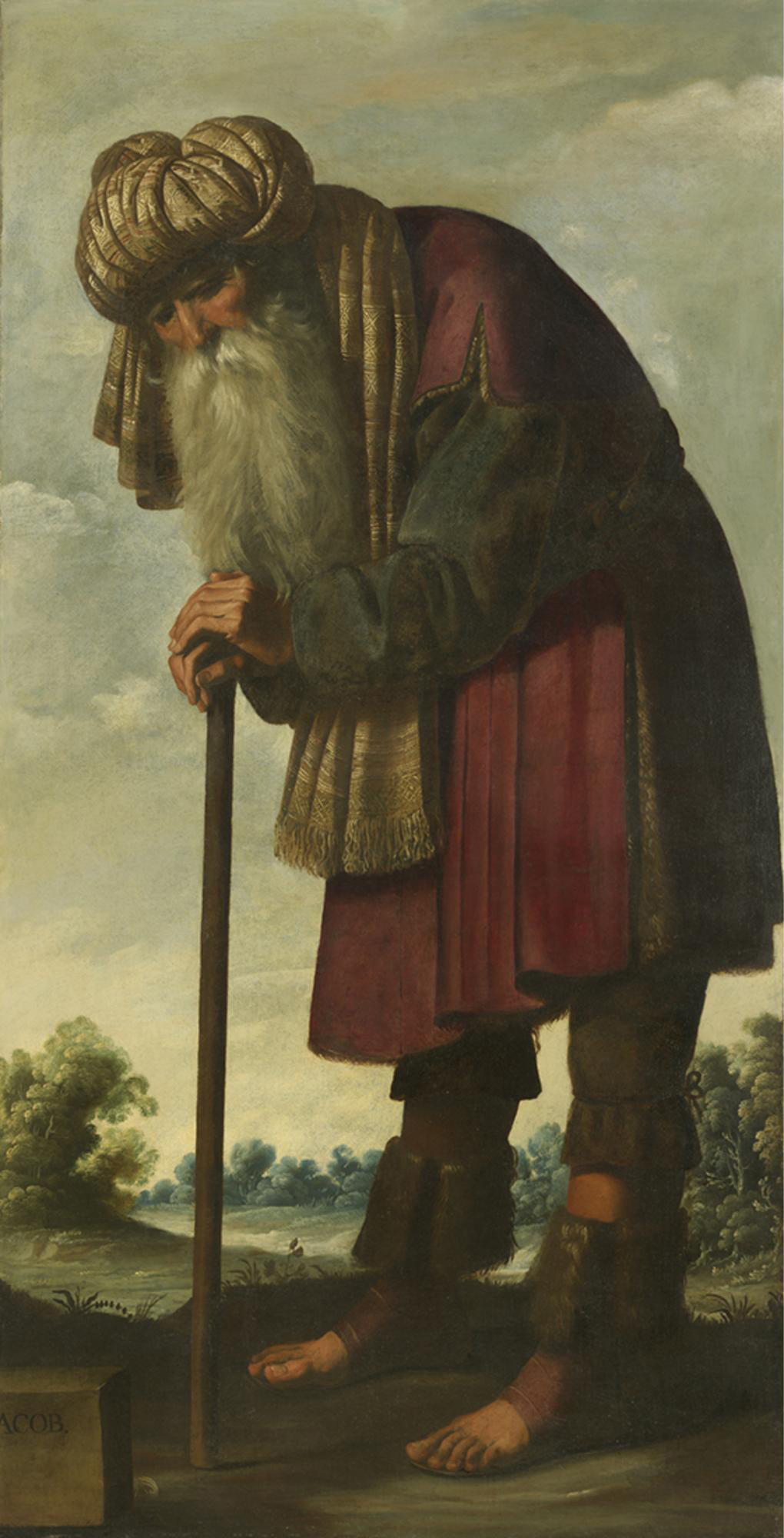
Jacob

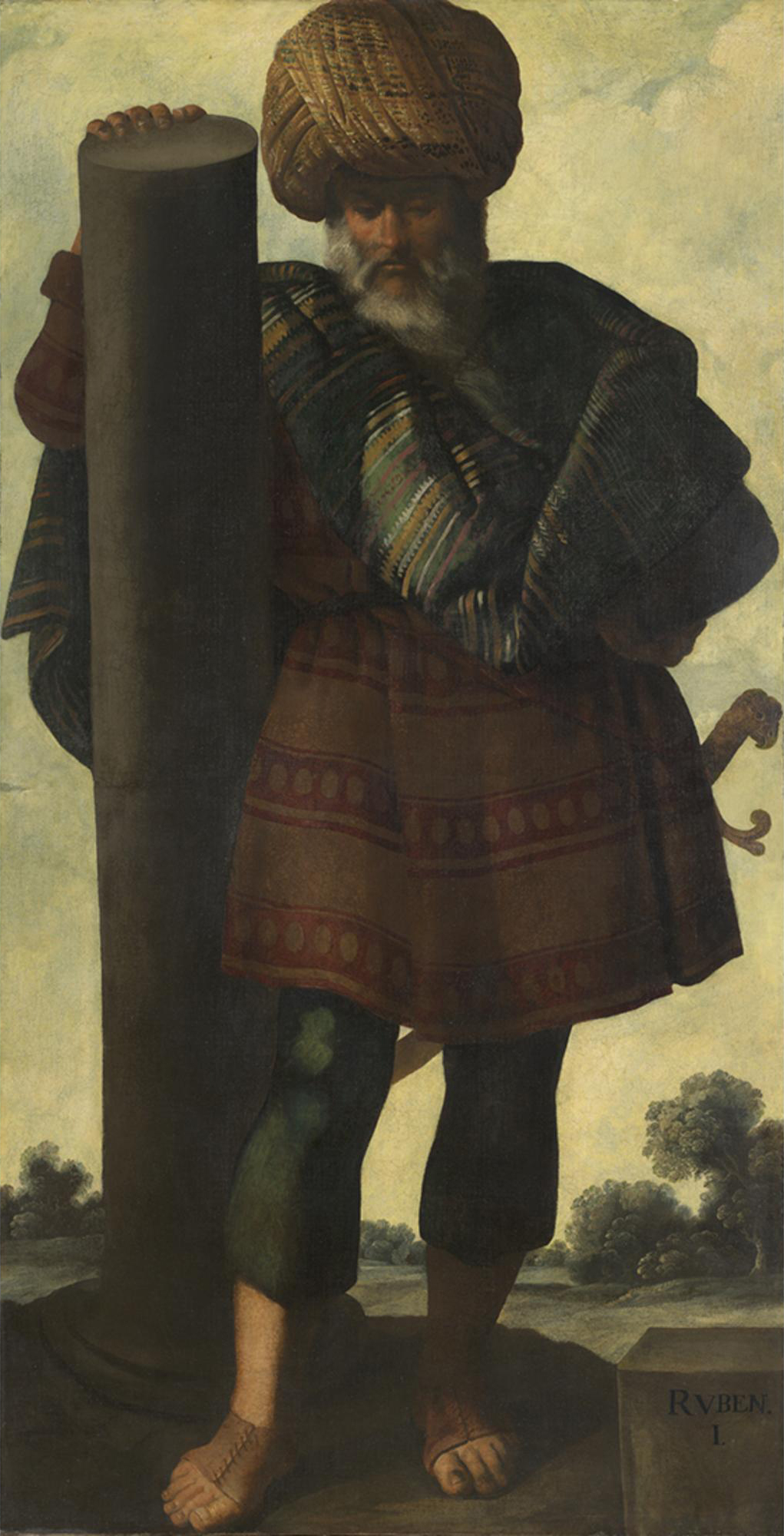
Reuben

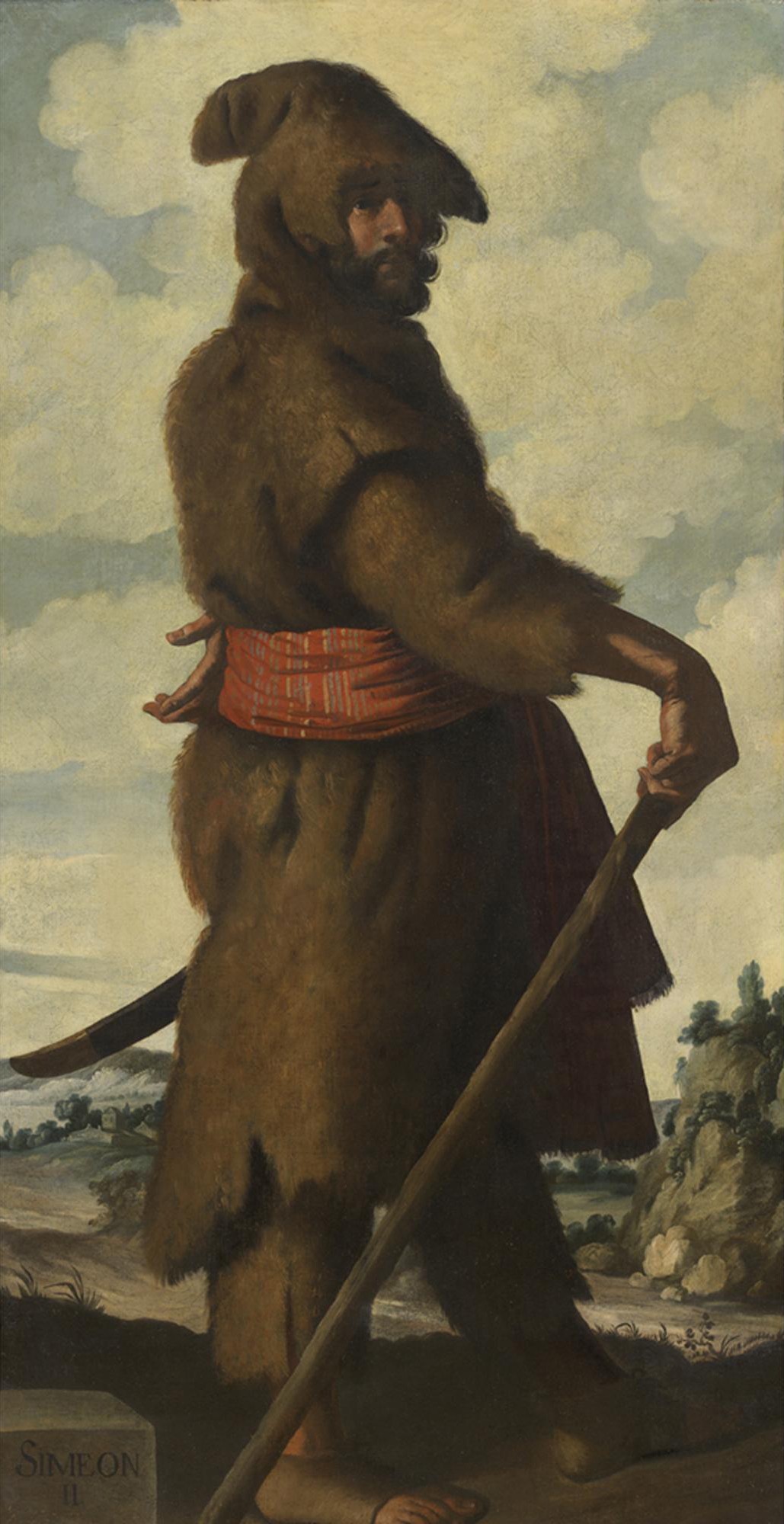
Simeon

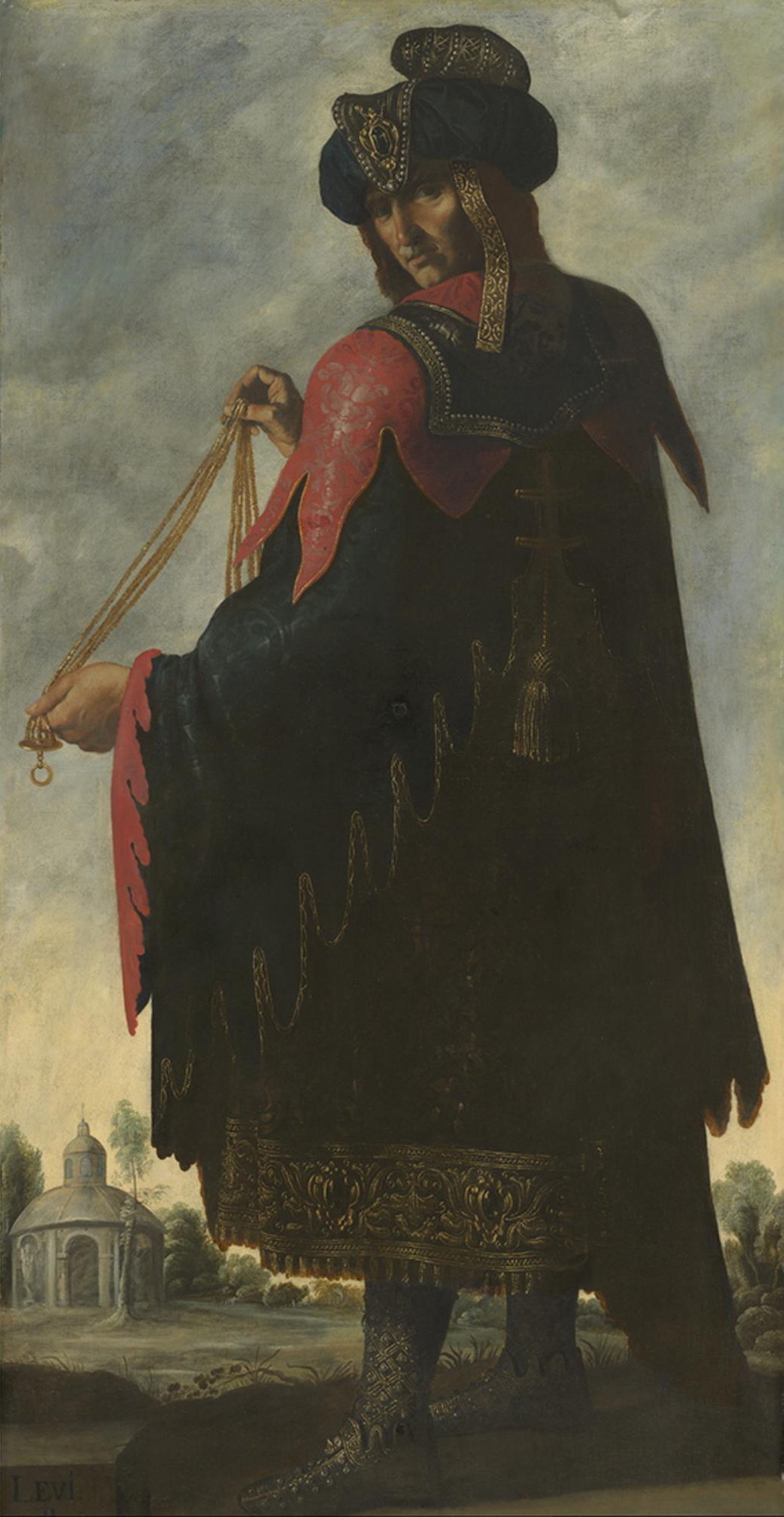
Levi

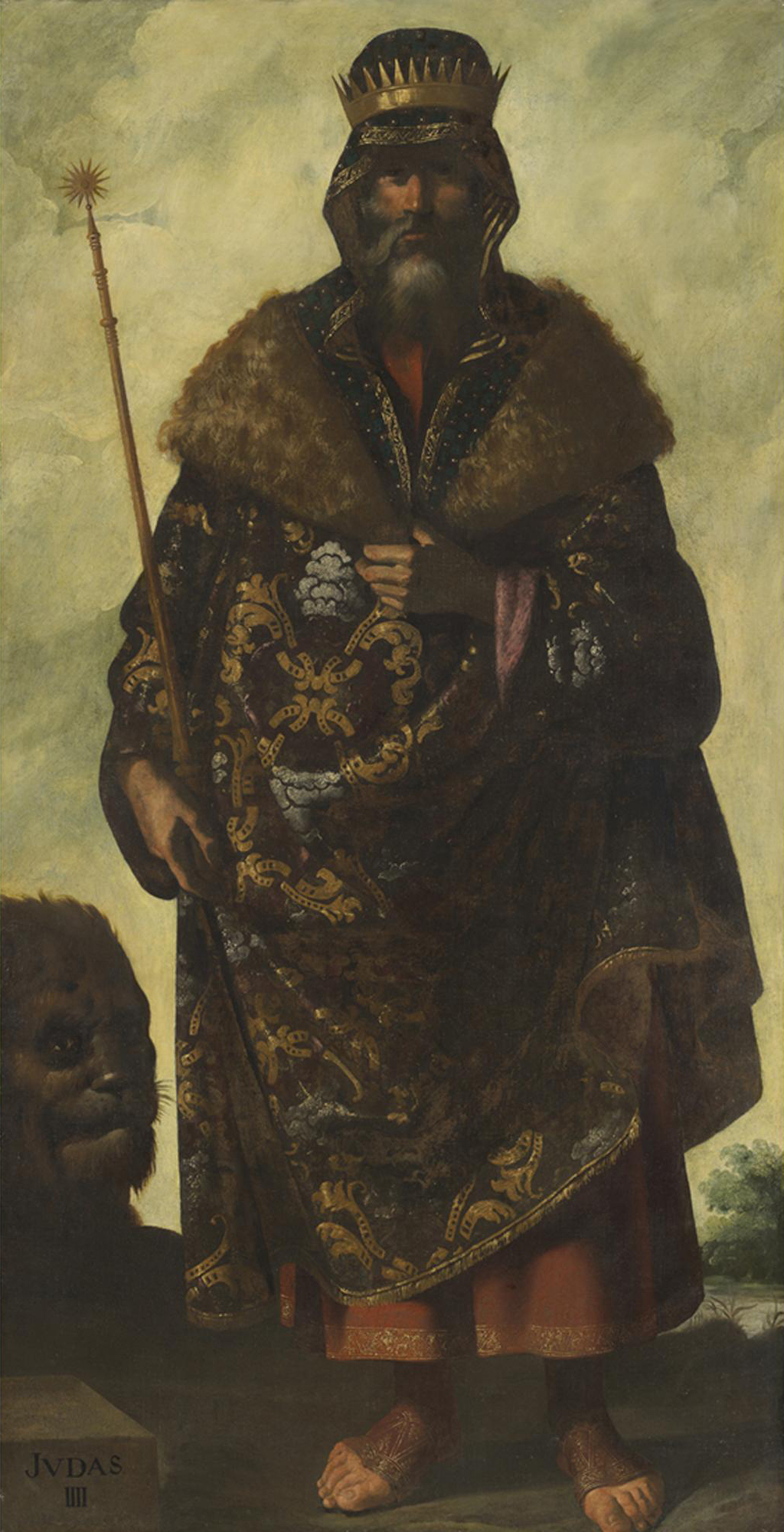
Judah

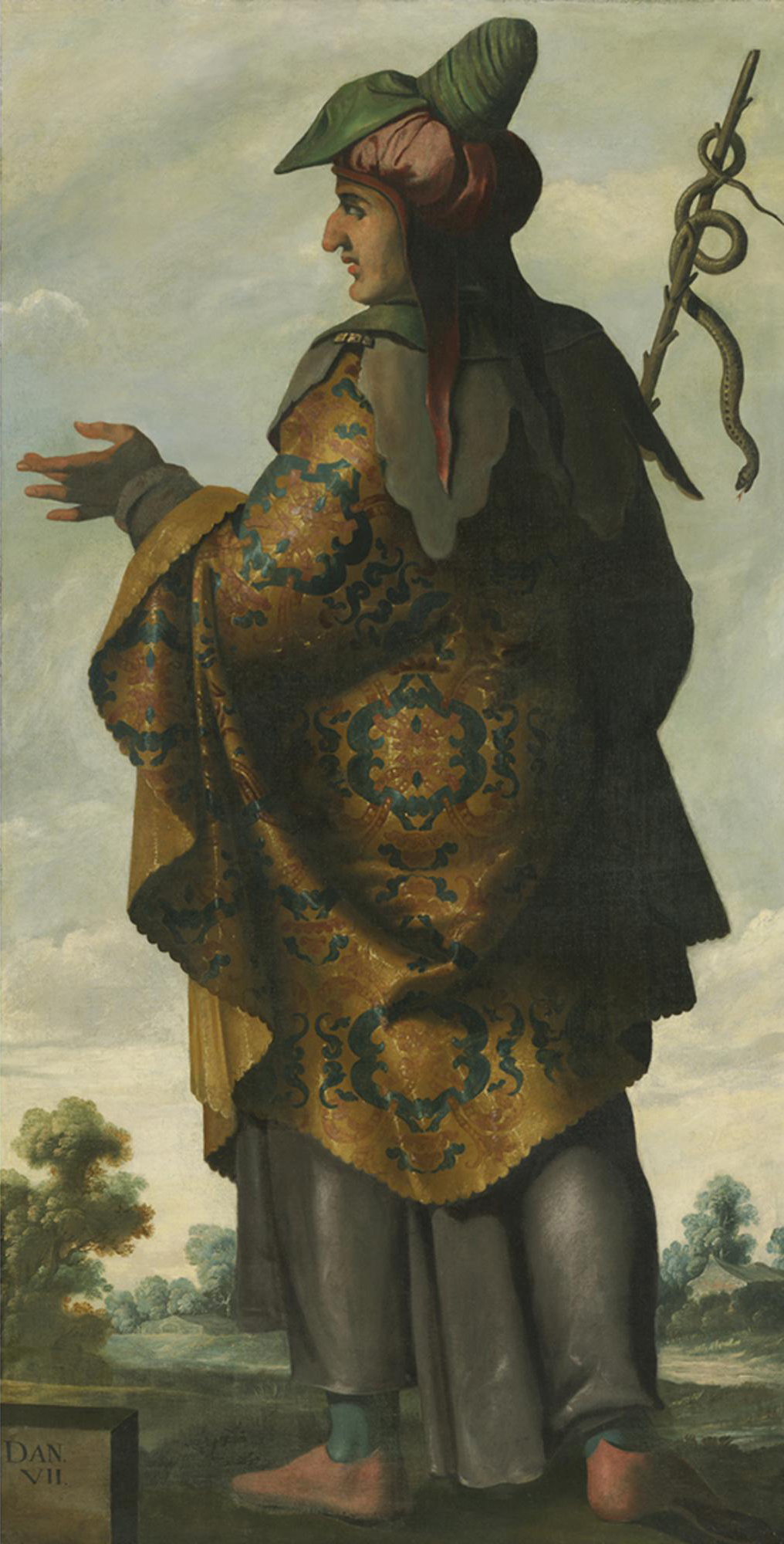
Dan

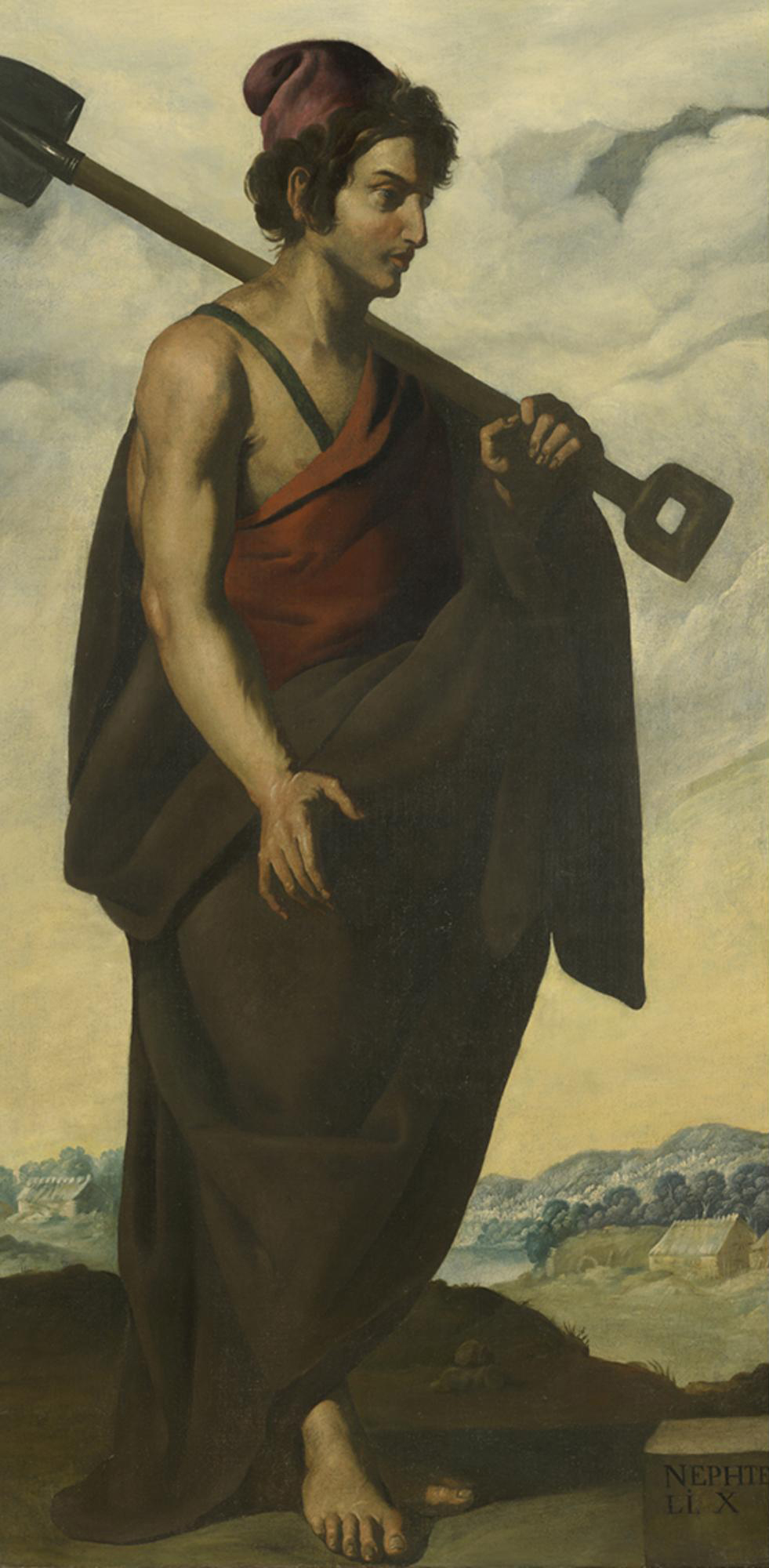
Naphtali

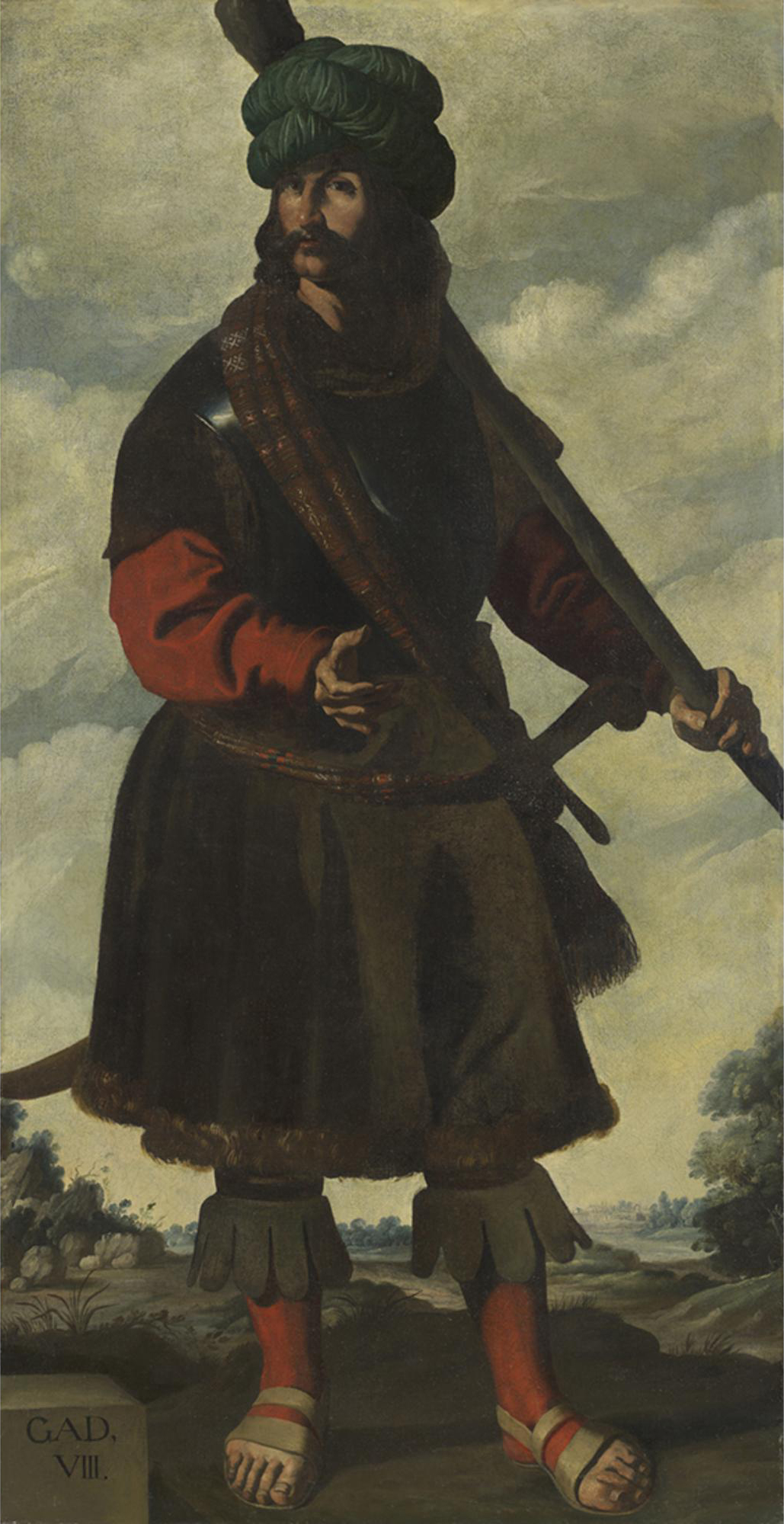
Gad

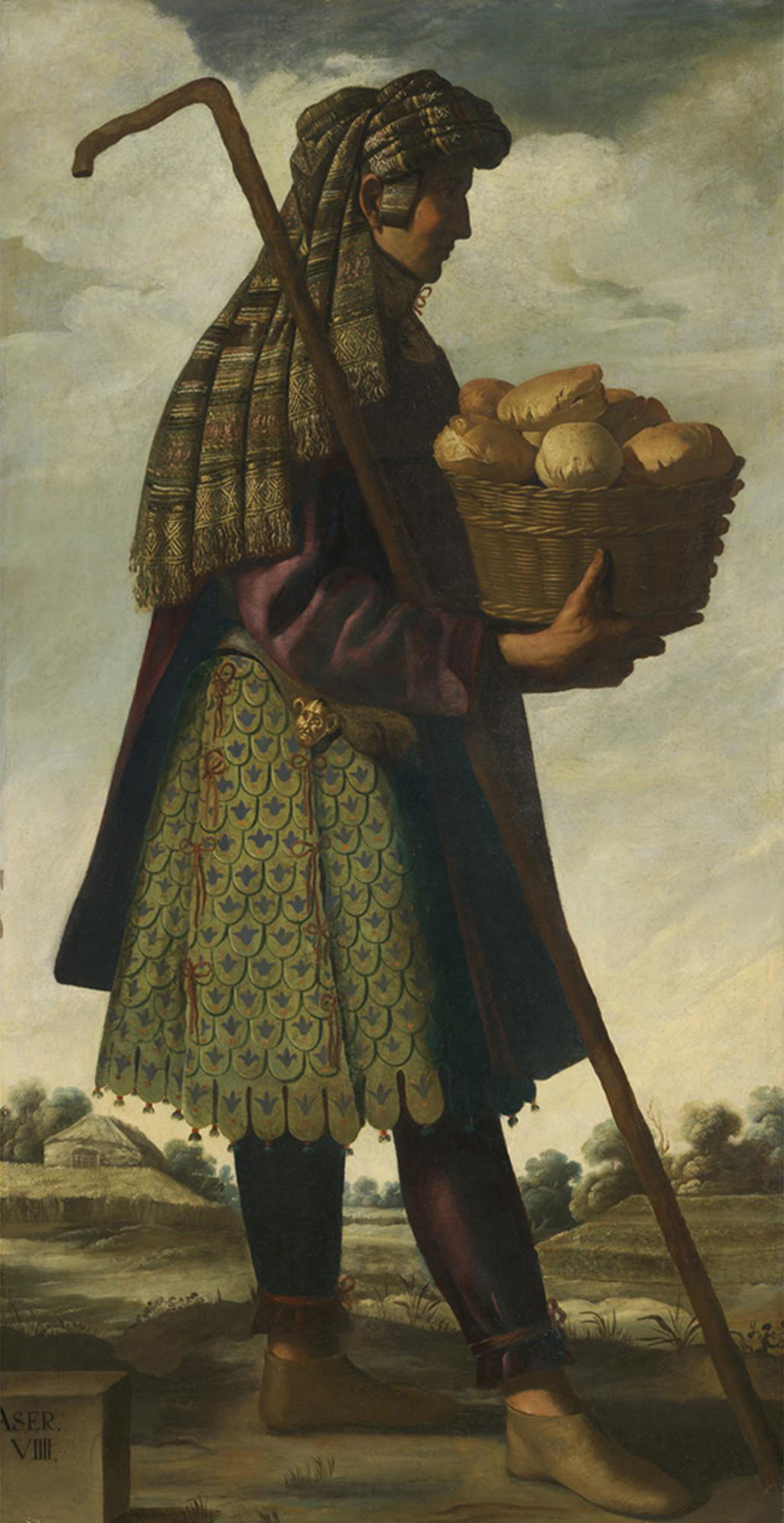
Asher

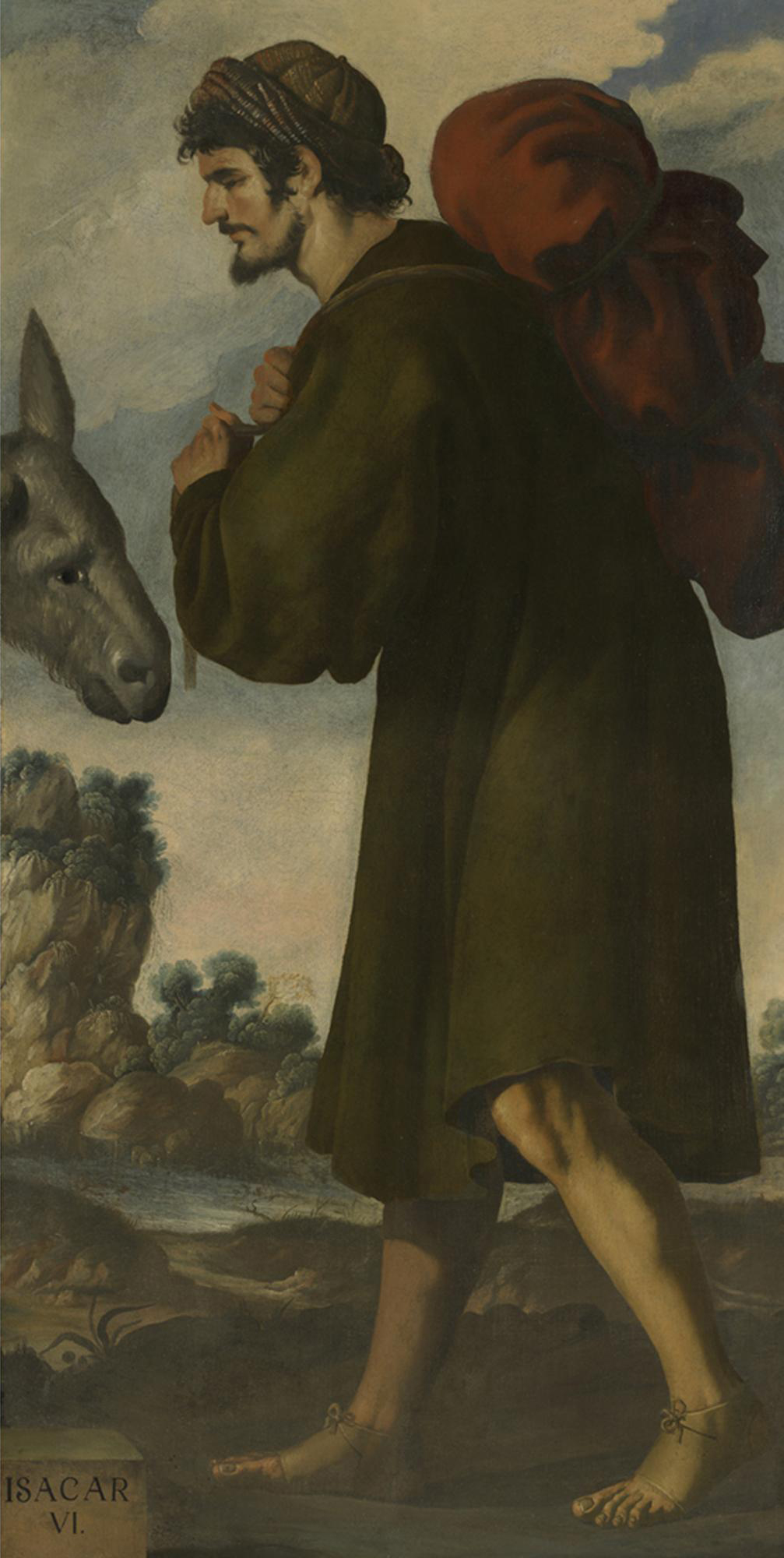
Issachar

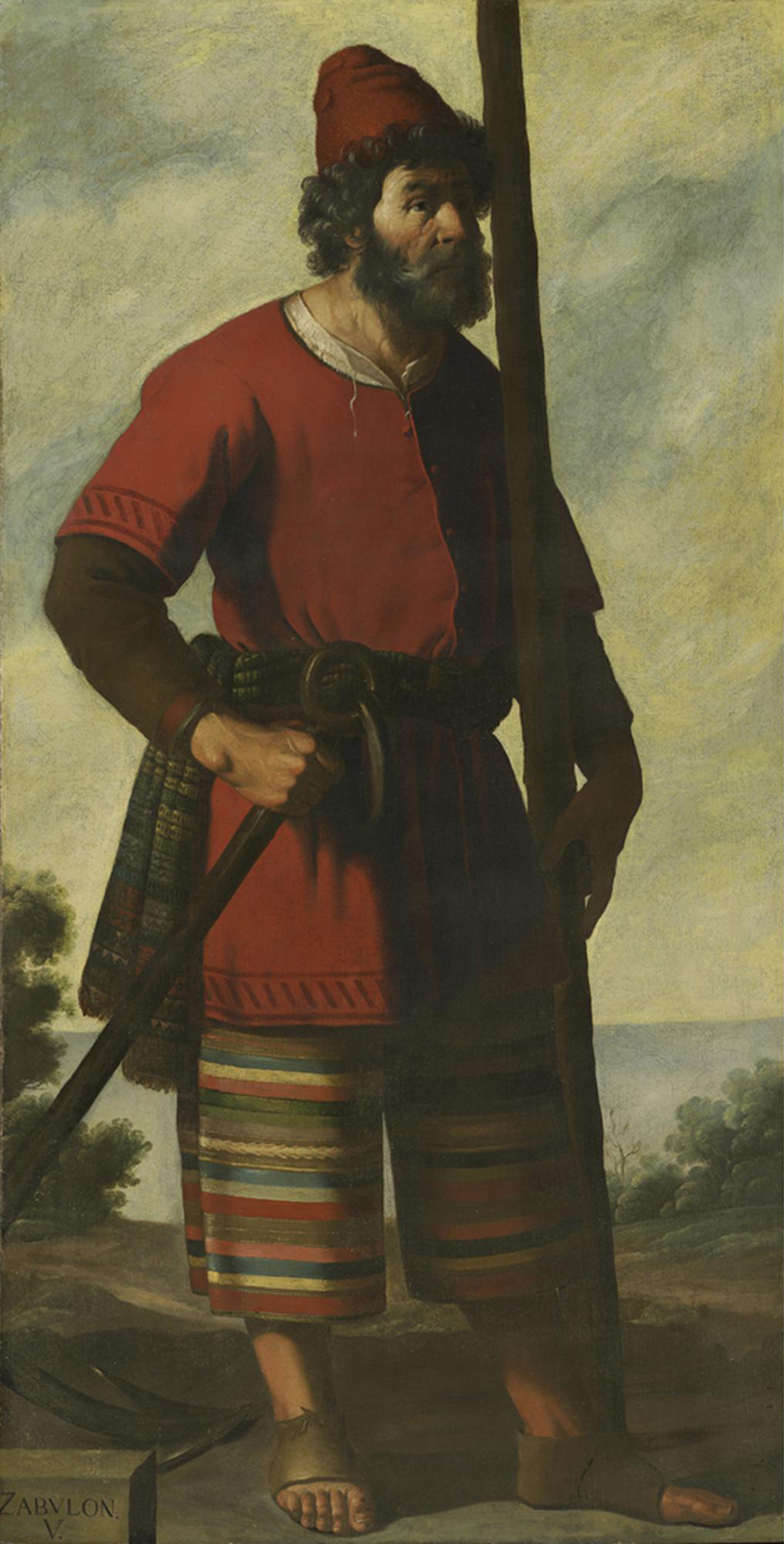
Zebulun

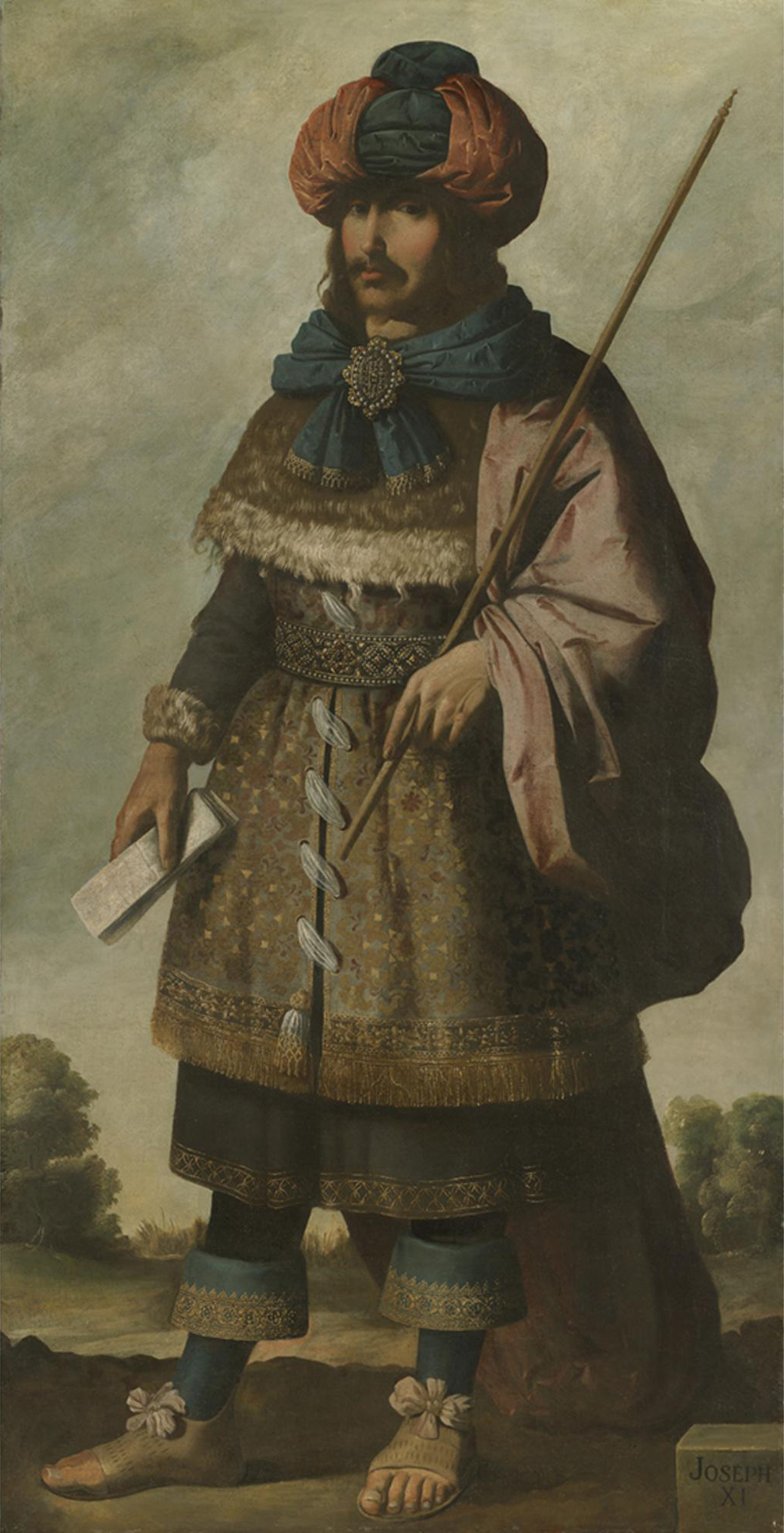
Joseph

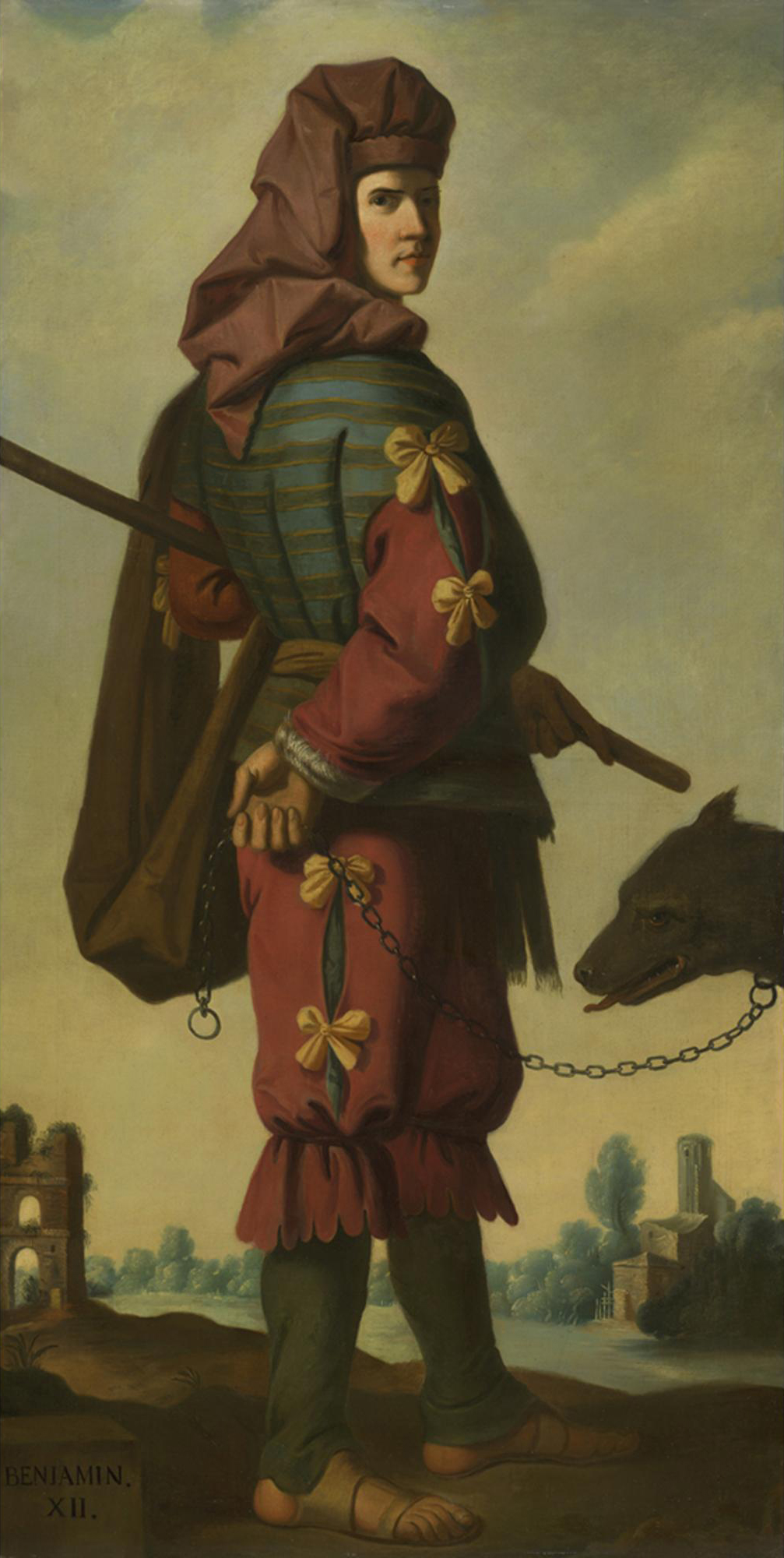
Benjamin
