= River Gaunless =

River in County Durham, England

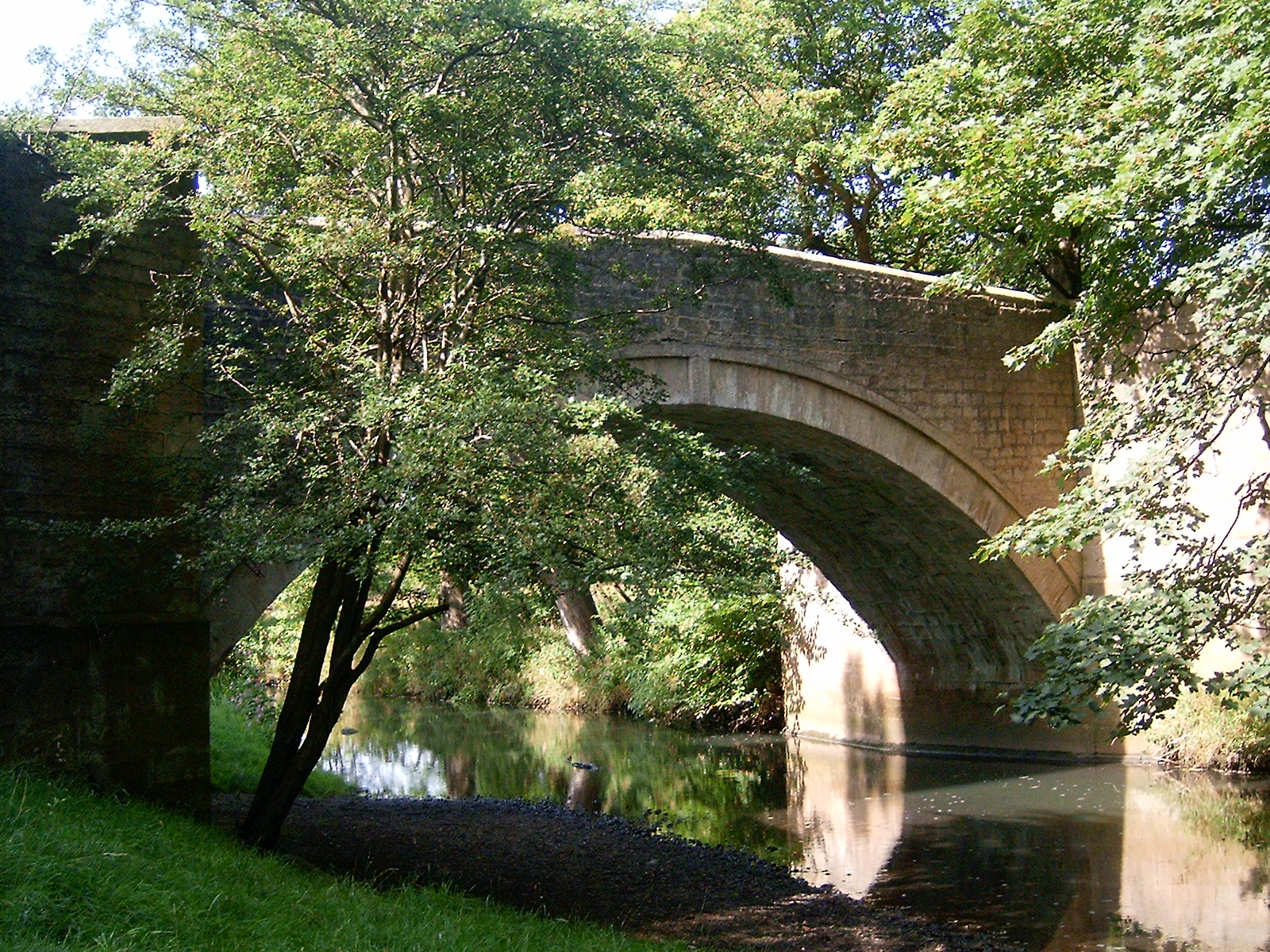
- The Gaunless at Auckland Castle grounds.

- Location of the mouth within County Durham

Location
- Country: England
- District: County Durham

Physical characteristics
- Source
  - location: Copley
  - coordinates: 54°37′12″N 1°52′12″W
  - elevation: 230 m (750 ft)
- Mouth
  - location: River Wear, Bishop Auckland
  - coordinates: 54°40′15.60″N 1°40′10.21″W
  - elevation: 70 m (230 ft)

The Gaunless is a tributary river of the Wear in County Durham, England. Its name is Old Norse, meaning "useless". The Gaunless Viaduct, built in 1825, was the tallest viaduct on the South Durham & Lancashire Union Railway.

Formed just south of the village of Copley, by the confluence of Arn Gill (to the south, coming west from south of Langleydale Common - on which lies Jerry Force waterfall) and Hindon Beck (to the north and coming east from Langleydale Common), the Gaunless wends its way east, passing the settlements of Butterknowle, Cockfield and Evenwood and through West Auckland before skirting the south and east of Bishop Auckland on its way to meet the River Wear.

An extension of the Copley Met Office weather station has been placed at the head of the river at Copley Lead Mill to study its unique climate of frost and snow. It lies in a frost hollow and receives no sunshine between October and March because of its geography.

== Settlements ==
- Copley
- Butterknowle
- Evenwood
- West Auckland
- Bishop Auckland

== Tributaries ==
- Arn Gill
- Hindon Beck
  - Cowclose Beck
    - Foul Sike
- Grewburn Beck
  - Howle Beck
- Gordon Beck
- Norton Fine Beck
- Oakley Cross Beck
- Hummer Beck
- Dene Beck
- Coundon Burn

== Bridges ==
- Gaunless Bridge
- Gaunless Viaduct
- Swin Bridge
