= Butterknowle =

Village in County Durham, England

Coordinates: 54.6269°N 1.8383°W

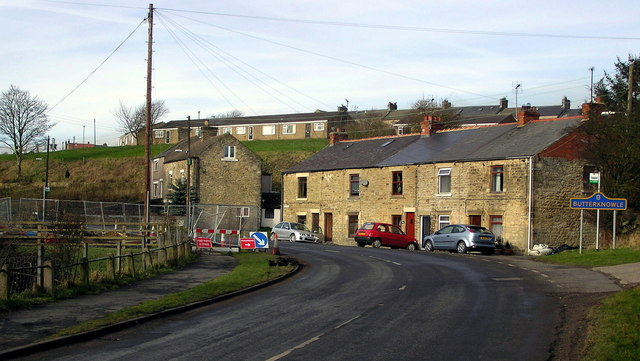
- Entering Butterknowle from the east

- Location within County Durham
- OS grid reference: NZ108852
- Unitary authority: County Durham
- Ceremonial county: County Durham
- Region: North East
- Country: England
- Sovereign state: United Kingdom
- Police: Durham
- Fire: County Durham and Darlington
- Ambulance: North East

Butterknowle is a village in Teesdale, County Durham, England. Butterknowle is situated between the market towns of Bishop Auckland (9 miles to the east) and Barnard Castle (6 miles to the south-west). It has an attractive rural setting within the Gaunless Valley, overlooked by Cockfield Fell. The fell itself is a scheduled ancient monument, containing evidence of Roman settlements and a medieval coal mine (Vavasours), thought to be the earliest inland colliery recorded.

A colliery at Butterknowle, formerly in the ownership of Sir Henry Vane, and leased to Thomas and Mary Lambert, is mentioned in the court papers of King Charles II in 1660.

The village of Butterknowle has a Primary School, Medical Practice, Village Hall, Royal Oak and Diamond Inn public houses, Post Office (closed in 1999, but reopened at the rear of the Diamond Inn premises in 2001) and Agricultural Supplies Merchant. The Church of St John the Evangelist is to be found in the neighbouring hamlet of Lynesack, about half a mile away, which is also home to a contemporary landscape photography studio and art gallery.

The war memorial, on Pinfold Lane near the village hall, is a Grade II listed building.

There are many public footpaths, both in the immediate area and surrounding countryside of Teesdale and nearby Weardale, making this a popular destination for walkers.

Raby Castle, 14th-century family seat of the Nevills and now home to the 11th Lord Barnard sits approximately 4 miles to the south, whilst travelling 4 miles to the north brings you to Hamsterley Forest, offering woodland and riverside walking, mountain-biking and horse-riding. High Force, one of England's highest and most spectacular single-drop waterfalls, is located a short drive away in Upper Teesdale.
